= 2007 Real Salt Lake season =

American soccer team season

Real Salt Lake
2007 season
- Owner: (United States) SCP Worldwide
- Head Coach: (United States) John Ellinger (Fired May 3rd) (United States) Jason Kreis (Hired May 3rd)
- Stadium: Rice-Eccles Stadium
- Major League Soccer: 12th
- MLS Cup Playoffs: DNQ
- 2007 U.S. Open Cup: N/A
- Rocky Mountain Cup: Winners
- Average home league attendance: 15,960
- Biggest win: RSL 3-1 Kansas City Wizards (8/29)
- Biggest defeat: CHV 4-0 RSL (4/21)
Home colors	Away colors

The 2007 Real Salt Lake season was the third season of the team's existence. After seeing slight improvement in 2006, the team struggled again under manager John Ellinger, opening the 2007 campaign with a 0-2-2 record. Ownership made a drastic move on May 3, firing Ellinger, and announcing that team captain (Jason Kreis), would retire and become the new head coach. RSL tied its next two matches against New York Red Bulls and the Colorado Rapids, but saw limited success the rest of the season. RSL finished the year with the league's second-worst record, ahead of expansion team Toronto FC.

The 2007 season also saw construction of its new soccer-specific stadium in Sandy, Utah, continue. Additionally, under Kreis' management, the team undertook a massive roster overhaul that essentially rebuilt the squad. Among the new players that arrives in 2007, many would go on to comprise the core of the team for several years, including, Kyle Beckerman (soon-to-be captain), Chris Wingert, Robbie Findley, Fabián Espíndola, and Javier Morales. At the center of the remake was Kreis' new team philosophy of "The Team is the Star", and a new primary formation (possession-oriented, diamond midfield).

Also vital to the growth of the club was the hiring of the team's second general manager, Garth Lagerwey, on September 19. Lagerwey, a former MLS goalkeeper, was a teammate of Kreis' at Duke University and Dallas Burn. The two proved to be a great tandem which led to future player acquisitions for the team within the next year including Will Johnson, Robbie Russell, Nat Borchers, and Jámison Olave.

Real Salt Lake finished the season on October 20 with a 1–0 win over Colorado. In an otherwise disappointing year, the win secured RSL's first ever Rocky Mountain Cup victory. The team finished with a record of 6-15-9 and a -14 goal differential, placing last in the Western Conference.

== Squad ==
=== 2007 roster ===
Note: Flags indicate national team as defined under FIFA eligibility rules; some limited exceptions apply. Players may hold more than one non-FIFA nationality.

No.	Pos.	Nation	Player
1	GK	USA	Chris Seitz
3	DF	USA	Carey Talley
4	FW	USA	Kyle Brown
5	MF	USA	Kyle Beckerman
6	DF	USA	Ritchie Kotschau
7	FW	ARG	Fabián Espíndola
8	MF	USA	Chris Brown
9	FW	USA	Jason Kreis †
9	MF	USA	Alecko Eskandarian
10	FW	USA	Robbie Findley
11	MF	ARG	Javier Morales
12	MF	USA	Nathan Sturgis
13	FW	SKN	Atiba Harris
14	FW	ARM	Yura Movsisyan
15	MF	USA	Kenny Cutler
16	DF	USA	Chris Lancos

No.	Pos.	Nation	Player
17	DF	USA	Chris Wingert
18	GK	USA	Nick Rimando
19	DF	LBR	Willis Forko
20	MF	USA	Nikolas Besagno
22	FW	USA	Jamie Watson
23	DF	USA	Eddie Pope
25	DF	CIV	Jean-Martial Kipre
27	DF	ARG	Matias Mantilla
28	MF	USA	Dustin Kirby
31	DF	USA	Jack Stewart
77	MF	JAM	Andy Williams
—	MF	USA	Steven Curfman ††
—	FW	USA	Duke Hashimoto ††
—	MF	USA	Christian Jimenez ††
—	GK	USA	Kyle Reynish ††
—	FW	USA	Jeff Rowland ††

 † Promoted to head coach on May 3
†† Saw no First Team minutes in 2007

=== Mid-Season Transfers ===
Due to the termination of John Ellinger as head coach and the subsequent promotion of Jason Kreis in early May, there were an abnormal number of mid-season transactions for the club. The players listed in the roster section above include those acquired during this makeover. Below are names of players acquired, traded, transferred, or released by the team after the May 3rd hiring of Kreis in chronological order:

- (Jamaica) Jeff Cunningham - Traded to Toronto FC for Alecko Eskandarian on May 22nd
- (Panama) Luis Tejada - Released by club in June
- (Costa Rica) Daniel Torres - Transferred to Bryne F.K. in June
- (United States) Chris Klein Traded to Los Angeles Galaxy for Robbie Findley and Nathan Sturgis on June 21st
- (United States) Chris Wingert - Acquired from Colorado Rapids on July 13th
- (Morocco) Mehdi Ballouchy - Traded to Colorado Rapids for Kyle Beckerman in July
- (United States) Freddy Adu - Transferred to Benfica on July 30th
- (Argentina) Fabián Espíndola - Acquired in August
- (Argentina) Javier Morales - Acquired in August
- (Argentina) Matias Mantilla - Acquired in August
- (Armenia) Yura Movsisyan - Acquired from Kansas City Wizards in September

== Competitions ==
=== League table ===
==== Western Conference ====
Western Conference
Pos	Club	Pts	GP	W	L	T	GF	GA	GD
1	Chivas USA	53	30	15	7	8	46	28	18
2	Houston Dynamo	52	30	15	8	7	43	23	20
3	FC Dallas	44	30	13	12	5	37	44	-7
4	Colorado Rapids	35	30	9	13	8	29	34	-5
5	Los Angeles Galaxy	34	30	9	14	7	38	48	-10
6	Real Salt Lake	27	30	6	15	9	31	45	-14

2007 MLS Cup Playoffs, 2008 U.S. Open Cup
2007 MLS Cup Playoffs (Wild Card), 2008 U.S. Open Cup

==== Overall ====
Pos	Club	Pts	GP	W	L	T	GF	GA	GD
1	D.C. United (E1)	55	30	16	7	7	56	34	22
2	Chivas USA (W1)	53	30	15	7	8	46	28	18
3	Houston Dynamo (W2)	52	30	15	8	7	43	23	20
4	New England Revolution (E2)	50	30	14	8	8	51	43	8
5	FC Dallas	44	30	13	12	5	37	44	-7
6	New York Red Bulls	43	30	12	11	7	47	45	2
7	Chicago Fire	40	30	10	10	10	31	36	-5
8	Kansas City Wizards	40	30	11	12	7	45	45	0
9	Columbus Crew	37	30	9	11	10	39	44	-5
10	Colorado Rapids	35	30	9	13	8	29	34	-5
11	Los Angeles Galaxy	34	30	9	14	7	38	48	-10
12	Real Salt Lake	27	30	6	15	9	31	45	-14
13	Toronto FC	25	30	6	17	7	25	49	-24

MLS Supporters' Shield, 2007 MLS Cup Playoffs, CONCACAF Champions' Cup 2008, SuperLiga 2008, CONCACAF Champions League 2008-09
2007 MLS Cup Playoffs, SuperLiga 2008, CONCACAF Champions League 2008–09
2007 MLS Cup Playoffs, SuperLiga 2008
2007 MLS Cup Playoffs

=== Results summary ===
Round	1	2	3	4	5	6	7	8	9	10	11	12	13	14	15	16	17	18	19	20	21	22	23	24	25	26	27	28	29	30
Ground	H	H	A	H	H	A	A	A	A	H	A	H	H	A	A	H	H	H	A	H	A	A	A	A	H	H	A	H	H	A
Result	T	T	L	L	T	T	L	T	T	L	L	W	L	L	L	L	W	L	L	W	W	L	L	T	T	W	T	L	L	W

Source: 2007 Major League Soccer season
A = Away; H = Home; W = Win; L = Loss; T = Tie

Overall								Home						Away					
Pld	Pts	W	L	T	GF	GA	GD	W	L	T	GF	GA	GD	W	L	T	GF	GA	GD
30	27	6	15	9	31	45	−14	4	7	4	18	22	−4	2	8	5	13	23	−10

Last updated: December 27, 2013
Pld = Matches played; Pts = Points; W = Matches won; T = Matches tied; L = Matches lost; GF = Goals for; GA = Goals against; GD = Goal difference

== Regular season ==
Win Tie Loss

=== April ===
April 7, 2007 1	Real Salt Lake	2 - 2	FC Dallas	Salt Lake City, Utah, USA
6:00PM ET				Stadium: Rice-Eccles Stadium

April 14, 2007 2	Real Salt Lake	0 - 0	Columbus Crew	Salt Lake City, Utah, USA
6:00PM ET				Stadium: Rice-Eccles Stadium

April 21, 2007 3	Chivas USA	4 - 0	Real Salt Lake	Carson, California, USA
10:30PM ET				Stadium: The Home Depot Center

April 30, 2007 4	Real Salt Lake	0 - 2	Colorado Rapids	Salt Lake City, Utah, USA
9:00PM ET				Stadium: Rice-Eccles Stadium

=== May ===
May 5, 2007 5	Real Salt Lake	3 - 3	New York Red Bulls	Salt Lake City, Utah, USA
9:00PM ET				Stadium: Rice-Eccles Stadium

May 10, 2007 6	Colorado Rapids	1 - 1	Real Salt Lake	Commerce City, Colorado, USA
9:00PM ET				Stadium: Dick's Sporting Goods Park

May 20, 2007 7	FC Dallas	2 - 1	Real Salt Lake	Frisco, Texas, USA
7:00PM ET				Stadium: Pizza Hut Park

May 27, 2007 8	Chicago Fire	0 - 0	Real Salt Lake	Bridgeview, Illinois, USA
5:00PM ET				Stadium: Toyota Park

=== June ===
June 2, 2007 9	New England Revolution	0 - 0	Real Salt Lake	Foxborough, Massachusetts, USA
7:30PM ET				Stadium: Gillette Stadium

June 14, 2007 10	Real Salt Lake	0 - 1	FC Dallas	Salt Lake City, Utah, USA
9:00PM ET				Stadium: Rice-Eccles Stadium

June 17, 2007 11	Los Angeles Galaxy	3 - 2	Real Salt Lake	Carson, California, USA
8:00PM ET				Stadium: The Home Depot Center

June 23, 2007 12	Real Salt Lake	2 - 1	D.C. United	Salt Lake City, Utah, USA
9:30PM ET				Stadium: Rice-Eccles Stadium

=== July ===
July 4, 2007 13	Real Salt Lake	1 - 2	Toronto FC	Salt Lake City, Utah, USA
10:00PM ET				Stadium: Rice-Eccles Stadium

July 7, 2007 14	Columbus Crew	2 - 0	Real Salt Lake	Columbus, Ohio, USA
7:30PM ET				Stadium: Columbus Crew Stadium

July 14, 2007 15	Kansas City Wizards	1 - 0	Real Salt Lake	Kansas City, Missouri, USA
8:00PM ET				Stadium: Arrowhead Stadium

July 28, 2007 16	Real Salt Lake	1 - 2	New England Revolution	Salt Lake City, Utah, USA
9:30PM ET				Stadium: Rice-Eccles Stadium

=== August ===
August 4, 2007 17	Real Salt Lake	1 - 0	Houston Dynamo	Salt Lake City, Utah, USA
9:00PM ET				Stadium: Rice-Eccles Stadium

August 18, 2007 18	Real Salt Lake	0 - 2	Chicago Fire	Salt Lake City, Utah, USA
9:00PM ET				Stadium: Rice-Eccles Stadium

August 26, 2007 19	Chivas USA	1 - 0	Real Salt Lake	Carson, California, USA
9:00PM ET				Stadium: The Home Depot Center

August 29, 2007 20	Real Salt Lake	3 - 1	Kansas City Wizards	Salt Lake City, Utah, USA
9:00PM ET				Stadium: Rice-Eccles Stadium

=== September ===
September 1, 2007 21	Los Angeles Galaxy	1 - 2	Real Salt Lake	Carson, California, USA
10:30PM ET				Stadium: The Home Depot Center

September 8, 2007 22	Houston Dynamo	4 - 3	Real Salt Lake	Houston, Texas, USA
8:30PM ET				Stadium: Robertson Stadium

September 12, 2007 23	D.C. United	2 - 1	Real Salt Lake	Washington, D.C., USA
7:30PM ET				Stadium: RFK Stadium

September 15, 2007 24	Toronto FC	0 - 0	Real Salt Lake	Toronto, Ontario, Canada
3:30PM ET				Stadium: BMO Field

September 19, 2007 25	Real Salt Lake	2 - 2	Los Angeles Galaxy	Salt Lake City, Utah, USA
9:00PM ET				Stadium: Rice-Eccles Stadium

September 22, 2007 26	Real Salt Lake	1 - 0	Colorado Rapids	Salt Lake City, Utah, USA
9:30PM ET				Stadium: Rice-Eccles Stadium

September 29, 2007 27	New York Red Bulls	2 - 2	Real Salt Lake	East Rutherford, New Jersey, USA
7:30PM ET				Stadium: Giants Stadium

=== October ===
October 6, 2007 28	Real Salt Lake	2 - 3	Chivas USA	Salt Lake City, Utah, USA
9:00PM ET				Stadium: Rice-Eccles Stadium

October 15, 2007 29	Real Salt Lake	0 - 1	Houston Dynamo	Salt Lake City, Utah, USA
9:00PM ET				Stadium: Rice-Eccles Stadium

October 20, 2007 30	Colorado Rapids	0 - 1	Real Salt Lake	Commerce City, Colorado, USA
9:00PM ET				Stadium: Dick's Sporting Goods Park

== Other matches and friendlies ==
18 April 2007 International friendly	Real Salt Lake	3–0	Fiji
		Report

7 June 2007 International friendly	Real Salt Lake	1–0	China	Salt Lake City
	Eskandarian 80'	Report		Stadium: Rice–Eccles Stadium; Attendance: 11,119

21 July 2007 International friendly	Real Salt Lake	2–0	Everton
		Report

24 July 2007 International friendly	Real Salt Lake	1–1	Boca Juniors
		Report
