= List of Real Salt Lake seasons =

This is a list of seasons played by Real Salt Lake in American (Major League Soccer) and CONCACAF soccer, from 2005 (when the team was founded) to the most recent completed season. It details the club's achievements in major competitions, and the top scorers for the team in each season.

== Key ==
Key to competitions

- Major League Soccer (MLS) – The top-flight of soccer in the United States, established in 1996.
- U.S. Open Cup (USOC) – The premier knockout cup competition in U.S. soccer, first contested in 1914.
- CONCACAF Champions League (CCL) – The premier competition in North American soccer since 1962. It went by the name of Champions' Cup until 2008.

Key to colors and symbols

1st or W	Winners
2nd or RU	Runners-up
3rd	Third place
Last	Wooden Spoon
♦	MLS Golden Boot
	Highest average attendance
Italics	Ongoing competition

Key to league record

- Season = The year and article of the season
- Div = Division/level on pyramid
- League = League name
- Pld = Games played
- W = Games won
- L = Games lost
- D = Games drawn
- GF = Goals for
- GA = Goals against
- GD = Goal difference
- Pts = Points
- PPG = Points per game
- Conf. = Conference position
- Overall = League position

Key to cup record

- DNE = Did not enter
- DNQ = Did not qualify
- NH = Competition not held or canceled
- QR = Qualifying round
- PR = Preliminary round
- GS = Group stage
- R1 = First round
- R2 = Second round
- R3 = Third round
- R4 = Fourth round
- R5 = Fifth round
- Ro16 = Round of 16
- QF = Quarterfinals
- SF = Semifinals
- F = Final
- RU = Runners-up
- W = Winners

== Seasons ==
Results of Real Salt Lake league and cup competitions by season
Season	League										Position		Playoffs	USOC	Continental / Other		Average attendance (Note: Average attendance is calculated from regular season matches only and excludes matches played behind closed doors.)	Top goalscorer(s) (Note: Top goalscorer(s) includes all goals scored in the regular season, MLS Cup Playoffs, U.S. Open Cup, MLS is Back Tournament, Leagues Cup, CONCACAF Champions League, FIFA Club World Cup, and other competitive matches.)	
Season	League	Pld	W	L	D	GF	GA	GD	Pts	PPG	Conf.	Overall	Playoffs	USOC	Competition	Result	Average attendance	Player(s)	Goals
2005	MLS	32	5	22	5	30	65	–35	20	0.63	5th	11th	DNQ	R3	—		18,037	(United States) Jason Kreis	9
2006	MLS	32	10	13	9	45	49	–4	39	1.22	6th	10th	DNQ	Ro16	—		16,366	(Jamaica) Jeff Cunningham	17♦ (Note: Cunningham won the MLS Golden Boot (16 goals))
2007	MLS	30	6	15	9	31	45	–14	27	0.90	6th	12th	DNQ	QR2	—		15,960	(United States) Chris Brown	5
2008	MLS	30	10	10	10	40	39	+1	40	1.33	3rd	7th	SF	QR2	—		16,179	(Armenia) Yura Movsisyan	8
2009	MLS	30	11	12	7	43	35	+8	40	1.33	5th	8th	W	QR1	—		16,375	(United States) Robbie Findley	15
2010	MLS	30	15	4	11	45	20	+25	56	1.87	2nd	2nd	QF	QR3	CONCACAF Champions League	RU	17,095	(Costa Rica) Álvaro Saborío	18
2011	MLS	34	15	11	8	44	36	+8	53	1.56	3rd	3rd	SF	QF	DNQ		17,591	(Costa Rica) Álvaro Saborío	16
2012	MLS	34	17	11	6	46	35	+11	57	1.68	2nd	5th	QF	R3	CONCACAF Champions League	GS	19,087	(Costa Rica) Álvaro Saborío	19
2013	MLS	34	16	10	8	57	41	+16	56	1.65	2nd	4th	RU	RU	—		19,218	(Costa Rica) Álvaro Saborío	13
2014	MLS	34	15	8	11	54	39	+15	56	1.65	3rd	4th	QF	R4	—		20,351	(Ecuador) Joao Plata	13
2015	MLS	34	11	15	8	38	48	–10	41	1.21	9th	16th	DNQ	SF	CONCACAF Champions League	QF	20,160	(Argentina) Javier Morales	10
2016	MLS	34	12	12	10	44	46	–2	46	1.35	6th	9th	R1	Ro16	—		19,759	(Ecuador) Joao Plata	8
2017	MLS	34	13	15	6	49	55	–6	45	1.32	8th	14th	DNQ	R4	—		18,781	Four players tied	7
2018	MLS	34	14	13	7	55	58	–3	49	1.44	6th	12th	QF	R4	—		18,605	(Croatia) Damir Kreilach	15
2019	MLS	34	16	13	5	46	41	+5	53	1.56	3rd	6th	QF	R4	Leagues Cup	QF	18,121	(Slovakia) Albert Rusnák	10
2020	MLS	22	5	10	7	25	35	–10	22	1.00	11th	21st	DNQ	NH	Leagues Cup MLS is Back Tournament	NH Ro16	5,655	(Croatia) Damir Kreilach	9
2021	MLS	34	14	14	6	55	54	+1	48	1.41	7th	13th	SF	NH	—		14,290	(Croatia) Damir Kreilach	16
2022	MLS	34	12	11	11	43	45	–2	47	1.38	7th	14th	R1	R3	—		20,470	(Venezuela) Sergio Córdova	11
2023	MLS	34	14	12	8	48	50	–2	50	1.47	5th	11th	R1	R3	Leagues Cup	Ro16	19,429	(Venezuela) Jefferson Savarino	7
2024	MLS	34	16	7	11	65	48	+17	59	1.74	3rd	6th	R1	Ro32	Leagues Cup	GS	20,295	(Colombia) Cristian Arango	17
Total (as of 2024)		648	247	238	163	903	884	+19	904	1.40	—	—	—	—	—		17,806	(Costa Rica) Álvaro Saborío	63
