= 2006 Real Salt Lake season =

American soccer team season

Real Salt Lake
2006 season
- Owner: SCP Worldwide
- Head coach: John Ellinger
- Stadium: Rice-Eccles Stadium
- Major League Soccer: 10th
- MLS Cup Playoffs: DNQ
- US Open Cup: Fourth Round
- Rocky Mountain Cup: Runners-Up
- Average home league attendance: 16,366
- Biggest win: COL 1-4 RSL (8/9)
- Biggest defeat: NYRB 6-0 RSL (8/26)
Home colors	Away colors

The 2006 Real Salt Lake season was the second season of the team's existence. The team has some improvement over the previous season. However, despite mixed results on the field, RSL scored a huge victory off the field in 2006. After much controversy and debate, the franchise finally secured a guarantee for a state-of-the-art, soccer-specific stadium to be built in Sandy – a suburb of Salt Lake City.

The team broke ground for the structure on the morning of August 12, with representatives from soccer giant Real Madrid present. That evening, RSL faced its namesake in front of a sellout crowd of 45,511 fans at Rice-Eccles Stadium. Salt Lake made a good showing, but Real Madrid won the exhibition match, 2–0.

== Squad ==
=== 2006 roster ===
Note: Flags indicate national team as defined under FIFA eligibility rules; some limited exceptions apply. Players may hold more than one non-FIFA nationality.

No.	Pos.	Nation	Player
1	GK	USA	Scott Garlick
2	DF	USA	Nelson Akwari
3	DF	USA	Carey Talley
5	DF	CRC	Daniel Torres
7	MF	JAM	Andy Williams
8	DF	USA	Joey Worthen
9	MF	USA	Jason Kreis
10	MF	MAR	Mehdi Ballouchy
11	DF	USA	Chris Brown
13	FW	SKN	Atiba Harris
15	MF	USA	Kenny Cutler
16	DF	LBR	Willis Forko

No.	Pos.	Nation	Player
17	MF	USA	Chris Klein
18	GK	USA	Jay Nolly
19	DF	USA	Kevin Novak
20	MF	USA	Nikolas Besagno
21	MF	USA	Christian Jimenez
22	FW	USA	Jamie Watson
23	DF	USA	Eddie Pope
25	MF	CRC	Jafet Soto
27	DF	CRC	Douglas Sequeira
31	DF	USA	Jack Stewart
74	FW	JAM	Jeff Cunningham

== Competitions ==
=== League table ===
==== Western Conference ====
Pos	Team	Pld	W	L	T	GF	GA	GD	Pts	Qualification
1	FC Dallas	32	16	12	4	48	44	+4	52	MLS Cup Playoffs
2	Houston Dynamo	32	11	8	13	44	40	+4	46	MLS Cup Playoffs
3	Chivas USA	32	10	9	13	45	42	+3	43	MLS Cup Playoffs
4	Colorado Rapids	32	11	13	8	36	49	−13	41	MLS Cup Playoffs
5	Los Angeles Galaxy	32	11	15	6	37	37	0	39	
6	Real Salt Lake	32	10	13	9	45	49	−4	39	

Source: MLS

==== Overall ====
Pos	Team	Pld	W	L	T	GF	GA	GD	Pts	Qualification
1	D.C. United (S)	32	15	7	10	52	38	+14	55	CONCACAF Champions' Cup
2	FC Dallas	32	16	12	4	48	44	+4	52	North American SuperLiga
3	New England Revolution	32	12	8	12	39	35	+4	48	
4	Chicago Fire	32	13	11	8	43	41	+2	47	
5	Houston Dynamo (C)	32	11	8	13	44	40	+4	46	CONCACAF Champions' Cup
6	Chivas USA	32	10	9	13	45	42	+3	43	
7	Colorado Rapids	32	11	13	8	36	49	−13	41	
8	New York Red Bulls	32	9	11	12	41	41	0	39	
9	Los Angeles Galaxy	32	11	15	6	37	37	0	39	North American SuperLiga
10	Real Salt Lake	32	10	13	9	45	49	−4	39	
11	Kansas City Wizards	32	10	14	8	43	45	−2	38	
12	Columbus Crew	32	8	15	9	30	42	−12	33	

Source: MLS
Rules for classification: 1) points; 2) head-to-head record; 3) goal difference; 4) number of goals scored
(C) Champions; (S) Supporters' Shield

=== Results summary ===
Round	1	2	3	4	5	6	7	8	9	10	11	12	13	14	15	16	17	18	19	20	21	22	23	24	25	26	27	28	29	30	31	32
Stadium	A	A	H	A	H	H	A	H	H	H	A	A	H	A	H	A	A	H	H	H	A	A	H	A	H	H	A	H	A	A	H	A
Result	L	L	T	L	L	L	W	W	T	W	L	L	T	L	T	L	W	L	T	W	W	W	W	L	W	L	T	W	L	T	T	T

Source: MLS Results and League table
A = Away; H = Home; W = Win; L = Loss; T = Tie

Overall								Home						Away					
Pld	Pts	W	L	T	GF	GA	GD	W	L	T	GF	GA	GD	W	L	T	GF	GA	GD
32	39	10	13	9	45	49	−4	6	4	6	23	19	+4	4	9	3	22	30	−8

Last updated: November 8, 2012
Pld = Matches played; Pts = Points; W = Matches won; T = Matches tied; L = Matches lost; GF = Goals for; GA = Goals against; GD = Goal difference

== Regular season ==
Win Tie Loss

=== April ===
April 2, 2006 MT 1	Chivas USA	3–0	Real Salt Lake	Carson, California
14:00	Ante Razov 21', 65'; Juan Pablo Garcia 25'; Jonathan Bornstein (yellow card) 40'	Report	Eddie Pope (yellow card) 17'	Stadium: The Home Depot Center

April 8, 2006 MT 2	FC Dallas	2–1	Real Salt Lake	Frisco, Texas
17:30	Greg Vanney (yellow card) 2'; Simo Valakari (yellow card) 35'; Kenny Cooper 43'; Mark Wilson 57'	Report	Chris Klein 36'	Stadium: Pizza Hut Park

April 15, 2006 MT 3	Real Salt Lake	1–1	New York Red Bulls	Salt Lake City
17:00 MT	Carey Talley (yellow card) 59'; Jason Kreis 36'	Report		Stadium: Rice-Eccles Stadium

April 22, 2006 MT 4	Houston Dynamo	2–1	Real Salt Lake	Houston, Texas
17:30	Craig Waibel 58'; Adrian Serioux (yellow card) 69'; Dwayne De Rosario 84'	Report	Jeff Cunningham (yellow card) 8' (goal) 57'; Carey Talley (yellow card) 68'	Stadium: Robertson Stadium

April 29, 2006 5	Real Salt Lake	2-3	Los Angeles Galaxy	Salt Lake City
12:00	Jason Kreis 6' (yellow card) 83' (yellow-red card) 87'; Atiba Harris (yellow card) 70' (goal) 74'	Report	Landon Donovan 11'; Cobi Jones 26'; Herculez Gomez 60'; Chris Albright (yellow card) 87'	Stadium: Rice Eccles Stadium

=== May ===
May 6, 2006 6	Real Salt Lake	0-1	Columbus Crew	Salt Lake City
17:00	Jeff Cunningham (yellow card) 62'; Atiba Harris (yellow card) 69'; Carey Talley (yellow card) 79'; Mehdi Ballouchy (yellow card) 90'	Report	Jason Garey 70'; Jose Retiz (red card) 85'	Stadium: Rice Eccles Stadium

May 13, 2006 7	Los Angeles Galaxy	0-3	Real Salt Lake	Los Angeles
17:30	Paulo Nagamura (yellow card) 44'; Ugo Ihemelu (yellow card) 70'; Josh Gardner (yellow card) 90+2'	Report	Atiba Harris 17' (yellow card) 65'; Nelson Akwari (yellow card) 19'; Willis Forko (yellow card) 31'; Daniel Torres (yellow card) 85'; Jeff Cunningham 72', 87'; Scott Garlick (yellow card) 75'	Stadium: Home Depot Center

May 20, 2006 8	Real Salt Lake	2-1	Kansas City Wizards	Salt Lake City
17:00	Atiba Harris (yellow card) 41'; Nelson Akwari (yellow card) 51'; Mehdi Ballouchy 78'; Jeff Cunningham 80'	Report	Ryan Pore 27'; Davy Arnaud (yellow card) 28'; Nick Garcia (yellow card) 46'	Stadium: Rice Eccles Stadium

May 27, 2006 9	Real Salt Lake	2-2	Colorado Rapids	Salt Lake City
12:00	Atiba Harris (yellow card) 54' (yellow-red card) 82'; Jeff Cunningham (yellow card) 67' (goal) 73' (pen.); Jason Kreis 88'; Andy Williams (yellow card) 89'	Report	Dedi Ben Dayan (yellow card) 15'; Jovan Kirovski 33'; Daniel Wasson 84'; Hunter Freeman (yellow card) 89'; Bouna Coundoul (yellow card) 90+2'	Stadium: Rice Eccles Stadium

=== June ===
June 3, 2006 10	Real Salt Lake	3-1	Chicago Fire	Salt Lake City
17:00	Jeff Cunningham 57', 77'; Dasan Robinson 69' (o.g.)	Report	Dasan Robinson (yellow card) 17'; Brian Plotkin 62'	Stadium: Rice Eccles Stadium

June 9, 2006 11	Colorado Rapids	1-0	Real Salt Lake	Denver
17:30	Jovan Kirovski (yellow card) 9'; Nicolas Hernandez 16'; Kyle Beckerman (yellow card) 21'	Report	Jeff Cunningham (yellow card) 34'	Stadium: Invesco Field at Mile High

June 17, 2006 12	Houston Dynamo	2-1	Real Salt Lake	Houston, Texas
17:30	Brian Mullan (yellow card) 31' (goal) 36'; Eddie Robinson (yellow card) 55'; Alejandro Moreno 83'; Pat Onstad (yellow card) 87'	Report	Carey Talley (yellow card) 15'; Scott Garlick (yellow card) 22'; Kenny Cutler (yellow card) 34'; Andy Williams (yellow card) 59'; Jason Kreis 88' (pen.)	Stadium: Robertson Stadium

June 24, 2006 13	Real Salt Lake	0-0	New England Revolution	Salt Lake City
17:00		Report	Jeff Larentowicz (yellow card) 59'	Stadium: Rice Eccles Stadium

June 28, 2006 14	Chicago Fire	2-1	Real Salt Lake	Bridgeview, Illinois
18:00	Chad Barrett 80', 85'	Report	Jason Kreis 25' (yellow card) 43'; Carey Talley (yellow card) 73'; Douglas Sequeira (yellow card) 81'	Stadium: Bridgeview Stadium

=== July ===
July 4, 2006 15	Real Salt Lake	0-0	Chivas USA	Salt Lake City
18:00	Jeff Cunningham (yellow card) 86'	Report		Stadium: Rice Eccles Stadium

July 8, 2006 16	Los Angeles Galaxy	2-0	Real Salt Lake	Los Angeles
17:30	Tyrone Marshall (yellow card) 21'; Ugo Ihemelu (yellow card) 40'; Herculez Gomez 47'; Josh Gardner 50'	Report	Douglas Sequeira (yellow card) 9'; Atiba Harris (yellow card) 57'; Andy Williams (yellow card) 79'	Stadium: Home Depot Center

July 14, 2006 17	New England Revolution	1-3	Real Salt Lake	Foxborough, MA
17:30	James Riley (yellow card) 35'; Taylor Twellman 57'	Report	Chris Klein 16'; Eddie Pope (yellow card) 18'; Jason Kreis (yellow card) 21' (goal) 55'; Jeff Cunningham 52'; Willis Forko (yellow card) 88'	Stadium: Gillette Stadium

July 22, 2006 18	Real Salt Lake	0-1	FC Dallas	Salt Lake City
18:00	Andy Williams (yellow card) 57'	Report	Abe Thompson 90+3'	Stadium: Rice Eccles Stadium

July 26, 2006 19	Real Salt Lake	3-3	Chivas USA	Salt Lake City
17:00	Jeff Cunningham 33'; Carey Talley 55'; Kevin Novak (yellow card) 63'; Andy Williams 74'	Report	Ante Razov 2'; Jonathan Bornstein 59'; Sacha Kljestan (yellow card) 81'; Claudio Suarez 90+4'	Stadium: Rice Eccles Stadium

July 29, 2006 20	Real Salt Lake	2-1	D.C. United	Salt Lake City
17:00	Nikolas Besagno (yellow card) 15'; Carey Talley (yellow card) 32'; Jeff Cunningham 90' (pen.), 90+5' (pen.); Jamie Watson (yellow card) 90+5'	Report	Jaime Moreno 36'; John Wilson (yellow card) 90+5'	Stadium: Rice Eccles Stadium

=== August ===
August 9, 2006 21	Colorado Rapids	1-4	Real Salt Lake	Denver
17:30	Clint Mathis (yellow card) 31'; Kyle Beckerman (yellow card) 42'; Hunter Freeman (yellow card) 58'; Aitor Karanka (yellow card) 69'; Eric Denton (red card) 75'; Thiago Martins 84'; Mike Petke (yellow card) 85'	Report	Jeff Cunningham 25', 76' (pen.); Mehdi Ballouchy (yellow card) 31'; Chris Klein 63'; Kenny Cutler (yellow card) 77'; Scott Garlick (yellow card) 85'; Douglas Sequeira (red card) 85'; Chris Brown 90+4'	Stadium: Invesco Field at Mile High

August 16, 2006 22	Columbus Crew	1-2	Real Salt Lake	Columbus, Ohio
17:30	Sebastian Rozental 23' (pen.); Ritchie Kotschau (yellow card) 70'	Report	Eddie Pope (yellow card) 8'; Chris Klein 75'; Carey Talley 90'; Scott Garlick (yellow card) 90+3'	Stadium: Columbus Crew Stadium

August 19, 2006 23	Real Salt Lake	3-1	Houston Dynamo	Salt Lake City
17:00	Chris Klein 45+2'; Douglas Sequeira 64' (yellow card) 77'; Scott Garlick (yellow card) 78'; Jeff Cunningham 82'	Report	Dwayne De Rosario (yellow card) 60'; Adrian Serioux 72'; Kelly Gray (yellow card) 90+2'	Stadium: Rice Eccles Stadium

August 26, 2006 24	New York Red Bulls	6-0	Real Salt Lake	East Rutherford, New Jersey
15:30	Edson Buddle 54', 61', 72'; Jordan Cila; Todd Dunivant 79'; John Wolyniec 86'	Report	Jack Stewart (red card) 8'	Stadium: Giants Stadium

August 30, 2006 25	Real Salt Lake	1-0	Los Angeles Galaxy	Salt Lake City
17:00	Kevin Novak (yellow card) 53'; Jeff Cunningham 60'; Mehdi Ballouchy (yellow card) 85'	Report	Tyrone Marshall (yellow card) 29'	Stadium: Rice Eccles Stadium

=== September ===
September 2, 2006 26	Real Salt Lake	0-1	Colorado Rapids	Salt Lake City
17:00	Scott Garlick (yellow card) 50'; Eddie Pope (yellow card) 70'	Report	Nicolas Hernandez 48'; Kyle Beckerman (yellow card) 62'; Colin Clark (yellow card) 66'; Hunter Freeman (yellow card) 84'; Dan Gargan (yellow card) 88'; Thiago Martins (yellow card) 88'	Stadium: Rice Eccles Stadium

September 9, 2006 27	D.C. United	1-1	Real Salt Lake	Washington, D.C.
17:30	Freddy Adu 45'; Brandon Prideaux (yellow card) 61'; Rod Dyachenko (yellow card) 64'; Ben Olsen (yellow card) 65'	Report	Jeff Cunningham (yellow card) 62'; Chris Klein 65'	Stadium: RFK Stadium

September 16, 2006 28	Real Salt Lake	3-2	FC Dallas	Salt Lake City
17:00	Andy Williams 13'; Chris Klein 62'; Jack Stewart (yellow card) 67'; Jason Kreis 72'; Atiba Harris (yellow card) 78'	Report	Carlos Ruiz 4', 45+1'; Ronnie O'Brien (yellow card) 27'; Bobby Rhine (yellow card) 36'	Stadium: Rice Eccles Stadium

September 23, 2006 29	FC Dallas	2-1	Real Salt Lake	Frisco, Texas
17:30	Carlos Ruiz 9'; Kenny Cooper 14' (yellow card) 68'	Report	Jeff Cunningham 48'; Kevin Novak (yellow card) 54'	Stadium: Pizza Hut Park

September 30, 2006 30	Kansas City Wizards	3-3	Real Salt Lake	Kansas City, Missouri
17:30	Josh Wolff 6'; Jose Burciaga (yellow card) 25' (goal) 63'; Jack Jewsbury (yellow card) 45'; Scott Sealy 54'	Report	Andy Williams (yellow card) 32'; Atiba Harris 35', 44'; Jason Kreis 81'	Stadium: Arrowhead Stadium

=== October ===
October 7, 2006 31	Real Salt Lake	1-1	Houston Dynamo	Salt Lake City
17:00	Carey Talley (yellow card) 54'; Atiba Harris (yellow card) 56'; Mehdi Ballouchy 60'	Report	Paul Dalglish 20' (yellow card) 78'; Ryan Cochrane (yellow card) 26'	Stadium: Rice Eccles Stadium

October 15, 2006 32	Chivas USA	1-1	Real Salt Lake	Los Angeles
14:00	Brent Whitfield 20'	Report	Jafet Soto 89'	Stadium: Home Depot Center

== U.S. Open Cup ==
=== Third round ===
August 2, 2006	(Utah) Real Salt Lake	0 - 1	Colorado Rapids
13:00		Report	Nicolas Hernandez (yellow card) 54'; Jacob Peterson 61'; Daniel Wasson (yellow card) 89'
