= 2005 Real Salt Lake season =

American soccer team season

Real Salt Lake
2005 season
- Owner: SCP Worldwide
- Head coach: John Ellinger
- Stadium: Rice-Eccles Stadium
- Major League Soccer: 11th
- MLS Cup: DNQ
- 2005 U.S. Open Cup: Third Round
- Rocky Mountain Cup: Runners-Up
- Average home league attendance: 18,037
- Biggest win: RSL 3-0 DAL (7/23)
- Biggest defeat: DC 5-1 RSL (8/30)
Home colors	Away colors

The 2005 Real Salt Lake season was the first season of the team's existence. The team ended with poor results, being the second lowest of the general table in the league of (5–22–5).

== Squad ==
=== 2005 roster ===
Note: Flags indicate national team as defined under FIFA eligibility rules; some limited exceptions apply. Players may hold more than one non-FIFA nationality.

No.	Pos.	Nation	Player
0	GK	USA	Noah Palmer
1	GK	USA	D.J. Countess
2	DF	USA	Nelson Akwari
3	DF	USA	Rusty Pierce
4	DF	TRI	Marlon Rojas
5	MF	USA	Brian Kamler
6	MF	USA	Jordan Cila
7	MF	JAM	Andy Williams
9	FW	USA	Jason Kreis (team captain)
10	MF	USA	Clint Mathis
11	MF	USA	Chris Brown
12	DF	TRI	Leslie Fitzpatrick
13	DF	USA	Brian Dunseth
14	FW	BOT	Dipsy Selolwane

No.	Pos.	Nation	Player
15	MF	USA	Leighton O'Brien
16	-	USA	Matt Behncke
17	MF	USA	Kenny Cutler
18	GK	USA	Jay Nolly
19	MF	USA	Luke Kreamalmeyer
20	MF	USA	Nikolas Besagno
21	MF	USA	Sergio Flores
22	FW	USA	Jamie Watson
23	DF	USA	Eddie Pope
24	MF	USA	Seth Trembly
27	DF	USA	Kevin Novak
31	-	USA	Mike Lookingland
32	DF	NZL	Cameron Knowles
99	FW	USA	Dante Washington

== Competitions ==
=== Major League Soccer ===
Pos	Team	Pld	W	L	T	GF	GA	GD	Pts	Qualification
1	San Jose Earthquakes (S)	32	18	4	10	53	31	+22	64	
2	New England Revolution	32	17	7	8	55	37	+18	59	CONCACAF Champions' Cup
3	D.C. United	32	16	10	6	58	37	+21	54	
4	Chicago Fire	32	15	13	4	49	50	−1	49	
5	Dallas Burn	32	13	10	9	52	44	+8	48	
6	MetroStars	32	12	9	11	53	49	+4	47	
7	Colorado Rapids	32	13	13	6	40	37	+3	45	
8	Los Angeles Galaxy (C)	32	13	13	6	44	45	−1	45	CONCACAF Champions' Cup
9	Kansas City Wizards	32	11	9	12	52	44	+8	45	
10	Columbus Crew	32	11	16	5	34	45	−11	38	
11	Real Salt Lake	32	5	22	5	30	65	−35	20	
12	Chivas USA	32	4	22	6	31	67	−36	18	

Source: MLS
Rules for classification: 1) points; 2) head-to-head record; 3) goal difference; 4) number of goals scored
(C) Champions; (S) Supporters' Shield

==== Western Conference ====
Pos	Team	Pld	W	L	T	GF	GA	GD	Pts	Qualification
1	San Jose Earthquakes	32	18	4	10	53	31	+22	64	MLS Cup Playoffs
2	FC Dallas	32	13	10	9	52	44	+8	48	MLS Cup Playoffs
3	Colorado Rapids	32	13	13	6	40	37	+3	45	MLS Cup Playoffs
4	Los Angeles Galaxy	32	13	13	6	44	45	−1	45	MLS Cup Playoffs
5	Real Salt Lake	32	5	22	5	30	65	−35	20	
6	Chivas USA	32	4	22	6	31	67	−36	18	

Source: MLS

=== Results summary ===
Overall								Home						Away					
Pld	Pts	W	L	T	GF	GA	GD	W	L	T	GF	GA	GD	W	L	T	GF	GA	GD
32	20	5	22	5	30	65	−35	5	8	3	19	24	−5	0	14	2	11	41	−30

Last updated: June 18, 2011
Pld = Matches played; Pts = Points; W = Matches won; T = Matches tied; L = Matches lost; GF = Goals for; GA = Goals against; GD = Goal difference

== Regular season ==
Win Tie Loss

=== April ===
April 2, 2005	MetroStars	0–0	Real Salt Lake	East Rutherford, New Jersey, United States
				Stadium: Giants Stadium

April 9, 2005	Los Angeles Galaxy	3–1	Real Salt Lake	Carson, California
				Stadium: The Home Depot Center

April 16, 2005	Real Salt Lake	1–0	Colorado Rapids	Salt Lake City
7:00 p.m. MT				Stadium: Rice-Eccles Stadium

April 23, 2005	FC Dallas	3–0	Real Salt Lake	Frisco, Texas
				Stadium: Pizza Hut Park; Attendance: 20,344; Referee: Mark Geiger

April 30, 2005	Real Salt Lake	2–2	San Jose Earthquakes	Salt Lake City
9:30 p.m. ET				Stadium: Rice-Eccles Stadium

=== May ===
May 7, 2005	Chivas USA	1–0	Real Salt Lake	Carson, California
10:00 p.m. MT				Stadium: The Home Depot Center

May 14, 2005	Real Salt Lake	2–1	Los Angeles Galaxy	Salt Lake City
9:30 p.m. ET				Stadium: Rice-Eccles Stadium

May 18, 2005	Real Salt Lake	2-0	Chivas USA	Salt Lake City
9:30 p.m. ET				Stadium: Rice-Eccles Stadium

May 21, 2005	Columbus Crew	2-0	Real Salt Lake	Columbus, Ohio
7:30 p.m. ET				Stadium: Columbus Crew Stadium

May 28, 2005	Real Salt Lake	0-3	Chicago Fire	Salt Lake City
9:30 p.m. ET				Stadium: Rice-Eccles Stadium

=== June ===
June 4, 2005	Real Salt Lake	0–2	FC Dallas	Salt Lake City
10:00 p.m. ET				Stadium: Rice-Eccles Stadium

June 11, 2005	Los Angeles Galaxy	1–0	Real Salt Lake	Carson, California
10:00 p.m. ET				Stadium: The Home Depot Center

June 18, 2005	San Jose Earthquakes	3–0	Real Salt Lake	San Jose, California
10:00 p.m. ET				Stadium: Spartan Stadium

June 22, 2005	Real Salt Lake	1-1	Los Angeles Galaxy	Salt Lake City
9:30 p.m. ET				Stadium: Rice-Eccles Stadium

June 26, 2005	Chicago Fire	3–1	Real Salt Lake	Chicago
7:00 p.m. ET				Stadium: Soldier Field

=== July ===
July 4, 2005	Real Salt Lake	2–2	MetroStars	Salt Lake City
9:30 p.m. ET				Stadium: Rice-Eccles Stadium

July 9, 2005	Chivas USA	5–1	Real Salt Lake	Carson, California
10:00 p.m. ET				Stadium: The Home Depot Center

July 16, 2005	Kansas City Wizards	3–2	Real Salt Lake	Kansas City, Missouri
8:00 p.m. ET				Stadium: Arrowhead Stadium

July 23, 2005	Real Salt Lake	3–0	FC Dallas	Salt Lake City
9:30 p.m. ET				Stadium: Rice-Eccles Stadium

=== August ===
August 6, 2005	Real Salt Lake	2–1	Chivas USA	Salt Lake City
6:00 p.m. ET				Stadium: Rice-Eccles Stadium

August 10, 2005	New England Revolution	4-1	Real Salt Lake	Foxboro, Massachusetts
7:30 ET				Stadium: Gillette Stadium

August 13, 2005	Real Salt Lake	2–4	Kansas City Wizards	Salt Lake City
9:30 p.m. ET				Stadium: Rice-Eccles Stadium

August 20, 2005	Real Salt Lake	0-1	San Jose Earthquakes	Salt Lake City
9:30 p.m. ET				Stadium: Rice-Eccles Stadium

August 30, 2005	D.C. United	5–1	Real Salt Lake	Washington, D.C.
				Stadium: RFK Stadium

=== September ===
September 3, 2005	Real Salt Lake	0-1	New England Revolution	Salt Lake City
9:30 p.m. ET				Stadium: Rice-Eccles Stadium

September 18, 2005	FC Dallas	2–1	Real Salt Lake	Frisco, Texas
2:00 p.m. ET				Stadium: Pizza Hut Park

September 21, 2005	Colorado Rapids	2-0	Real Salt Lake	Denver
9:30 p.m. ET				Stadium: Invesco Field at Mile High

September 24, 2005	Real Salt Lake	1-2	Columbus Crew	Salt Lake City
9:30 p.m. ET				Stadium: Rice-Eccles Stadium

=== October ===
October 1, 2005	Colorado Rapids	2-1	Real Salt Lake	Denver
9:00 p.m. ET				Stadium: Invesco Field at Mile High

October 5, 2005	Real Salt Lake	1-3	D.C. United	Salt Lake City
				Stadium: Rice-Eccles Stadium

October 8, 2005	San Jose Earthquakes	2-2	Real Salt Lake	San Jose, California
10:00 p.m. ET				Stadium: Spartan Stadium

October 12, 2005	Real Salt Lake	0-1	Colorado Rapids	Salt Lake City
9:30 p.m. ET				Stadium: Rice-Eccles Stadium

== U.S. Open Cup ==
=== Third round ===
July 13, 2005	Minnesota Thunder	6–4 (a.e.t.)	(Utah) Real Salt Lake	James Griffin Stadium, Saint Paul, Minnesota
	Melvin Tarley 16', 66'; Johnny Menyongar 17'; Aaron Paye 89', 107'; Matt Schmidt 96'		Jason Kreis 9' (pen.), 50', 70'; Jamie Watson 38'	Attendance: 2,218; Referee: Abbey Okulaja
