= 2008 Real Salt Lake season =

American soccer team season

Real Salt Lake
2008 season
- Owner: SCP Worldwide
- Coach: Jason Kreis
- Stadium: Rice-Eccles Stadium (until Oct 9) Rio Tinto Stadium (from Oct 9)
- MLS Cup Playoffs: Conference Finals
- 2008 U.S. Open Cup: N/A
- Rocky Mountain Cup: Winners
- Highest home attendance: 26,391 (vs Chivas USA, 20 September)
- Lowest home attendance: 10,333 (vs San Jose Earthquakes, 18 May)
- Average home league attendance: 16,174
- Biggest win: RSL 4-0 DC (4/12)
- Biggest defeat: DC 4-1 RSL (4/26)
Home colors	Away colors

The 2008 Real Salt Lake Season was the fourth season of the team's existence. It was the first season that the team made it to the MLS Cup Playoffs, thanks to some last minute heroics by Yura Movsisyan. After defeating Chivas USA in the first round of the playoffs, Real Salt Lake lost to New York Red Bulls in the Western Conference finals. The 2008 season was also the last season that Real Salt Lake played at Rice-Eccles Stadium, as they moved to the soccer-specific Rio Tinto Stadium on October 9, 2008.

== Squad ==
=== First Team ===
As of November 15, 2008 Note: Flags indicate national team as defined under FIFA eligibility rules; some limited exceptions apply. Players may hold more than one non-FIFA nationality.

No.	Pos.	Nation	Player
1	GK	USA	Chris Seitz
2	DF	USA	Tony Beltran
3	DF	GHA	Robbie Russell
4	DF	COL	Jamison Olave
5	MF	USA	Kyle Beckerman (Captain)
6	DF	USA	Nat Borchers
8	MF	CAN	Will Johnson
9	FW	ARG	Fabian Espindola
10	FW	USA	Robbie Findley
11	MF	ARG	Javier Morales
12	MF	USA	Nathan Sturgis
13	DF	USA	Ian Joy
14	FW	ARM	Yura Movsisyan

No.	Pos.	Nation	Player
15	MF	USA	Kenny Cutler
16	FW	SCO	Kenny Deuchar
17	DF	USA	Chris Wingert
18	GK	USA	Nick Rimando
21	MF	UKR	Dema Kovalenko
24	GK	USA	Kyle Reynish
25	FW	USA	Tino Nuñez
27	DF	ARG	Matias Mantilla
28	DF	USA	Dustin Kirby
33	DF	USA	David Horst
77	MF	JAM	Andy Williams
84	MF	USA	Clint Mathis

=== Formation ===
Starting XI vs. New York on November 15, 2008

== Results ==
=== League table ===
Conference

Pos	Team	Pld	W	L	T	GF	GA	GD	Pts	Qualification
1	Houston Dynamo	30	13	5	12	45	32	+13	51	MLS Cup Playoffs
2	Chivas USA	30	12	11	7	40	41	−1	43	MLS Cup Playoffs
3	Real Salt Lake	30	10	10	10	40	39	+1	40	MLS Cup Playoffs
4	Colorado Rapids	30	11	14	5	44	45	−1	38	
5	FC Dallas	30	8	10	12	45	41	+4	36	
6	LA Galaxy	30	8	13	9	55	62	−7	33	
7	San Jose Earthquakes	30	8	13	9	32	38	−6	33	

Source: MLS

Overall

Pos	Team	Pld	W	L	T	GF	GA	GD	Pts	Qualification
1	Columbus Crew (C, S)	30	17	7	6	50	36	+14	57	CONCACAF Champions League
2	Houston Dynamo	30	13	5	12	45	32	+13	51	CONCACAF Champions League
3	Chicago Fire	30	13	10	7	44	33	+11	46	North American SuperLiga
4	Chivas USA	30	12	11	7	40	41	−1	43	North American SuperLiga
5	New England Revolution	30	12	11	7	40	43	−3	43	North American SuperLiga
6	Kansas City Wizards	30	11	10	9	37	39	−2	42	North American SuperLiga
7	Real Salt Lake	30	10	10	10	40	39	+1	40	
8	New York Red Bulls	30	10	11	9	42	48	−6	39	CONCACAF Champions League
9	Colorado Rapids	30	11	14	5	44	45	−1	38	
10	D.C. United	30	11	15	4	43	51	−8	37	CONCACAF Champions League
11	FC Dallas	30	8	10	12	45	41	+4	36	
12	Toronto FC	30	9	13	8	34	43	−9	35	CONCACAF Champions League (Note: As winners of the 2009 Canadian Championship)
13	LA Galaxy	30	8	13	9	55	62	−7	33	
14	San Jose Earthquakes	30	8	13	9	32	38	−6	33	

Source: MLS
Rules for classification: 1) points; 2) head-to-head record; 3) goal difference; 4) number of goals scored
(C) Champions; (S) Supporters' Shield

=== Summary ===
Round	1	2	3	4	5	6	7	8	9	10	11	12	13	14	15	16	17	18	19	20	21	22	23	24	25	26	27	28	29	30
Ground	H	A	H	A	A	H	H	A	A	H	H	A	H	H	A	H	H	A	H	A	A	H	A	A	H	A	A	H	H	A
Result	T	L	W	L	L	T	W	L	L	W	T	W	T	L	L	T	W	T	W	L	L	W	T	L	L	W	T	T	W	T

Source: MLS Results and League table
A = Away; H = Home; W = Win; L = Loss; T = Tie

=== March ===
March 29, 2008	Real Salt Lake	1 – 1	Chicago Fire	Salt Lake City, Utah, USA
	Joy (yellow card) 51'; Soumare 71' (o.g.); Findley (yellow card) 78]'; Beckerman (yellow card) 88'		Pause (yellow card) 89'; Blanco 90'	Stadium: Rice-Eccles Stadium; Attendance: 20,272; Referee: Terry Vaughn

=== April ===
April 5, 2008	Chivas USA	3 – 1	Real Salt Lake	Carson, California, USA
				Stadium: The Home Depot Center; Attendance: 17,251

April 12, 2008	Real Salt Lake	4 – 0	D.C. United	Salt Lake City, Utah, USA
				Stadium: Rice-Eccles Stadium; Attendance: 13,193

April 19, 2008	Toronto FC	1 –0	Real Salt Lake	Toronto, Ontario, Canada
				Stadium: BMO Field; Attendance: 20,219

April 26, 2008	D.C. United	4 – 1	Real Salt Lake	Washington, D.C., USA
				Stadium: RFK Stadium; Attendance: 23,269

=== May ===
May 3, 2008	Real Salt Lake	2 – 2	Los Angeles Galaxy	Salt Lake City, Utah, USA
				Stadium: Rice-Eccles Stadium; Attendance: 25,500

May 10, 2008	Real Salt Lake	2 – 1	FC Dallas	Salt Lake City, Utah, USA
				Stadium: Rice-Eccles Stadium; Attendance: 12,173

May 15, 2008	Colorado Rapids	2 – 0	Real Salt Lake	Commerce City, Colorado, USA
				Stadium: Dick's Sporting Goods Park; Attendance: 11,414

May 24, 2008	FC Dallas	2 – 1	Real Salt Lake	Frisco, Texas, USA
				Stadium: Pizza Hut Park; Attendance: 8,960

May 31, 2008	Real Salt Lake	3 – 1	San Jose Earthquakes	Salt Lake City, Utah, USA
				Stadium: Rice-Eccles Stadium; Attendance: 15,977

=== June ===
June 7, 2008	Real Salt Lake	0 – 0	Kansas City Wizards	Salt Lake City, Utah, USA
				Stadium: Rice-Eccles Stadium; Attendance: 11,327

June 14, 2008	Chivas USA	0 – 1	Real Salt Lake	Carson, California, USA
				Stadium: The Home Depot Center; Attendance: 10,573

June 18, 2008	Real Salt Lake	0 – 0	San Jose Earthquakes	Salt Lake City, Utah, USA
				Stadium: Rice-Eccles Stadium; Attendance: 10,333

June 21, 2008	Real Salt Lake	2 – 1	New England Revolution	Salt Lake City, Utah, USA
				Stadium: Rice-Eccles Stadium; Attendance: 11,965

June 28, 2008	Kansas City Wizards	1 – 0	Real Salt Lake	Kansas City, Kansas, USA
				Stadium: CommunityAmerica Ballpark; Attendance: 10,385

=== July ===
July 3, 2008	Real Salt Lake	0 – 0	Houston Dynamo	Salt Lake City, Utah, USA
				Stadium: Rice-Eccles Stadium; Attendance: 17,898

July 12, 2008	Real Salt Lake	2 – 0	Columbus Crew	Salt Lake City, Utah, USA
				Stadium: Rice-Eccles Stadium; Attendance: 12,378

July 19, 2008	Chicago Fire	0 – 0	Real Salt Lake	Bridgeview, Illinois, USA
				Stadium: Toyota Park; Attendance: 19,578

July 28, 2008	Real Salt Lake	2 – 1	Toronto FC	Salt Lake City, Utah, USA
				Stadium: Rice-Eccles Stadium; Attendance: 12,319

=== August ===
August 16, 2008	Houston Dynamo	4 – 3	Real Salt Lake	Houston, Texas, USA
				Stadium: Robertson Stadium; Attendance: 13,579

August 23, 2008	Columbus Crew	3 – 0	Real Salt Lake	Columbus, Ohio, USA
				Stadium: Columbus Crew Stadium; Attendance: 12,448

August 29, 2008	Real Salt Lake	2 – 0	Colorado Rapids	Salt Lake City, Utah, USA
				Stadium: Rice-Eccles Stadium; Attendance: 15,257

=== September ===
September 6, 2008	Los Angeles Galaxy	2 – 2	Real Salt Lake	Carson, California, USA
				Stadium: The Home Depot Center; Attendance: 27,000

September 13, 2008	New York Red Bulls	2 – 1	Real Salt Lake	East Rutherford, New Jersey, USA
				Stadium: Giants Stadium; Attendance: 11,692

September 20, 2008	Real Salt Lake	0 – 1	Chivas USA	Salt Lake City, Utah, USA
				Stadium: Rice-Eccles Stadium; Attendance: 26,391

September 27, 2008	San Jose Earthquakes	2 – 3	Real Salt Lake	Santa Clara, California, USA
				Stadium: Buck Shaw Stadium; Attendance: 10,059

=== October ===
October 4, 2008	New England Revolution	2 – 2	Real Salt Lake	Foxborough, Massachusetts, USA
				Stadium: Gillette Stadium; Attendance: 18,893

October 9, 2008	Real Salt Lake	1 – 1	New York Red Bulls	Sandy, Utah, USA
				Stadium: Rio Tinto Stadium; Attendance: 20,008

October 18, 2008	Real Salt Lake	3 – 1	FC Dallas	Sandy, Utah, USA
				Stadium: Rio Tinto Stadium; Attendance: 17,628

October 25, 2008	Colorado Rapids	1 – 1	Real Salt Lake	Commerce City, Colorado, USA
				Stadium: Dick's Sporting Goods Park; Attendance: 16,047

=== MLS Playoffs ===
November 1, 2008 Conf. Semifinals	Real Salt Lake	1 – 0	Chivas USA	Sandy, Utah, USA
	Williams (yellow card) 29'; Beckerman (yellow card) 42'; Movsisyan 90'		Razov (yellow card) 66'; Thomas (yellow card) 75'	Stadium: Rio Tinto Stadium; Attendance: 14,719; Referee: Ricardo Salazar

November 8, 2008 Conf. Semifinals	Chivas USA	2 – 2	Real Salt Lake	Carson, California, USA
	Nagamura (yellow card) 22'; Kljestan 31' (pen.); Bornstein (yellow card) 60'; Braun 83'; Razov (yellow card) 86'; Thomas (yellow card) 90'		Mathis (yellow card) 10'; Borchers (yellow card) 30'; Kovalenko 39'; Kovalenko (yellow card) 42'; Morales 77'	Stadium: The Home Depot Center; Attendance: 19,265; Referee: Michael Kennedy

November 15, 2008 Conference Finals	Real Salt Lake	0 – 1	New York Red Bulls	Sandy, Utah, USA
			van den Bergh 28'; Goldthwaite (yellow card) 45'; Rojas (yellow card) 64'; Leitch (yellow card) 90'	Stadium: Rio Tinto Stadium; Attendance: 20,008; Referee: Jair Marrufo

== Kits ==
Home	Away	Special

Type	Shirt	Shorts	Socks	First appearance / Info
Home	Claret / Cobalt	Cobalt	Cobalt	
Away	White	White	White	
Special	Green	White	White	US Open Cup, April 30 against San Jose → Green Awareness Game
