= Chris Seitz =

American soccer player (born 1987)

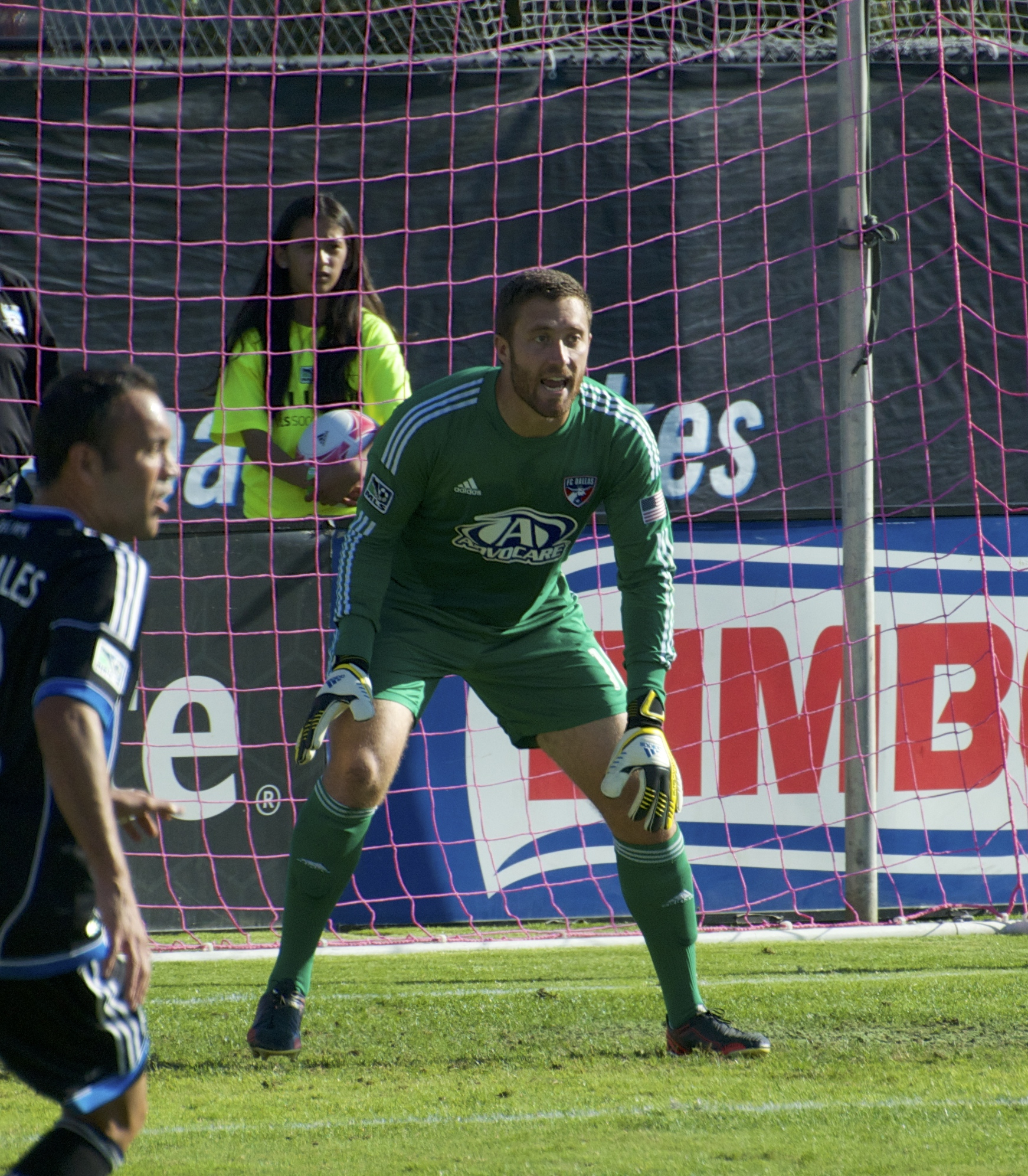

Personal information
- Full name: Christopher Seitz
- Date of birth: March 12, 1987 (age 39)
- Place of birth: San Luis Obispo, California, United States
- Height: 6 ft 4 in (1.93 m)
- Position: Goalkeeper

College career
Years	Team	Apps	(Gls)
2005–2006	Maryland Terrapins	39	(0)

Senior career*
Years	Team	Apps	(Gls)
2007–2009	Real Salt Lake	7	(0)
2009	→ Cleveland City (loan)	1	(0)
2009	→ Portland Timbers (loan)	2	(0)
2010	Philadelphia Union	23	(0)
2011–2017	FC Dallas	67	(0)
2018	Houston Dynamo	6	(0)
2018	→ Rio Grande Valley (loan)	1	(0)
2019–2021	D.C. United	11	(0)
2019	→ Loudoun United (loan)	1	(0)
Total		119	(0)

International career^{‡}
2007	United States U20	4	(0)
2008	United States U23	3	(0)
- * Club domestic league appearances and goals as of November 15, 2021 ‡ National team caps and goals as of October 13, 2009

Christopher Seitz (born March 12, 1987) is an American former soccer player. He played as a goalkeeper in Major League Soccer from 2007 until his retirement in 2021.

== Youth and college ==
Chris Seitz was awarded Gatorade's California High School Soccer Player of the Year award in 2004 while playing for San Luis Obispo High School under the tutelage of coach Bob Galarneau. He also scored four goals in his junior season, all on penalty kicks.

Seitz played college soccer at the University of Maryland for the 2005 and 2006 seasons. As a freshman at Maryland, Seitz won the NCAA national championship by posting a 13–1–2 record with a 0.89 goals against average. He was named College Cup Defensive MVP. During Seitz's two-year career at Maryland he registered a 28–5–3 record with a 0.77 GAA. He was the ACC Defensive Player of the Year in 2006.

== Professional career ==
=== Real Salt Lake ===
Seitz was drafted in the 2007 MLS SuperDraft where he was selected fourth overall by Real Salt Lake. In his first two starts, he had a 0–1–1 record and a 2.5 GAA. In 2009 Seitz played one game on loan for Cleveland City Stars of the USL First Division, a 3–1 loss to Miami FC, and two games on loan with the Portland Timbers, also of the USL First Division, both against the Carolina RailHawks. He was the first goalkeeper to face five penalties in one match. In three seasons in Salt Lake, Seitz was never able to un-seat veteran Nick Rimando as RSL's first-choice keeper.

=== Philadelphia Union ===
On November 25, 2009, he was traded to MLS expansion franchise Philadelphia Union.

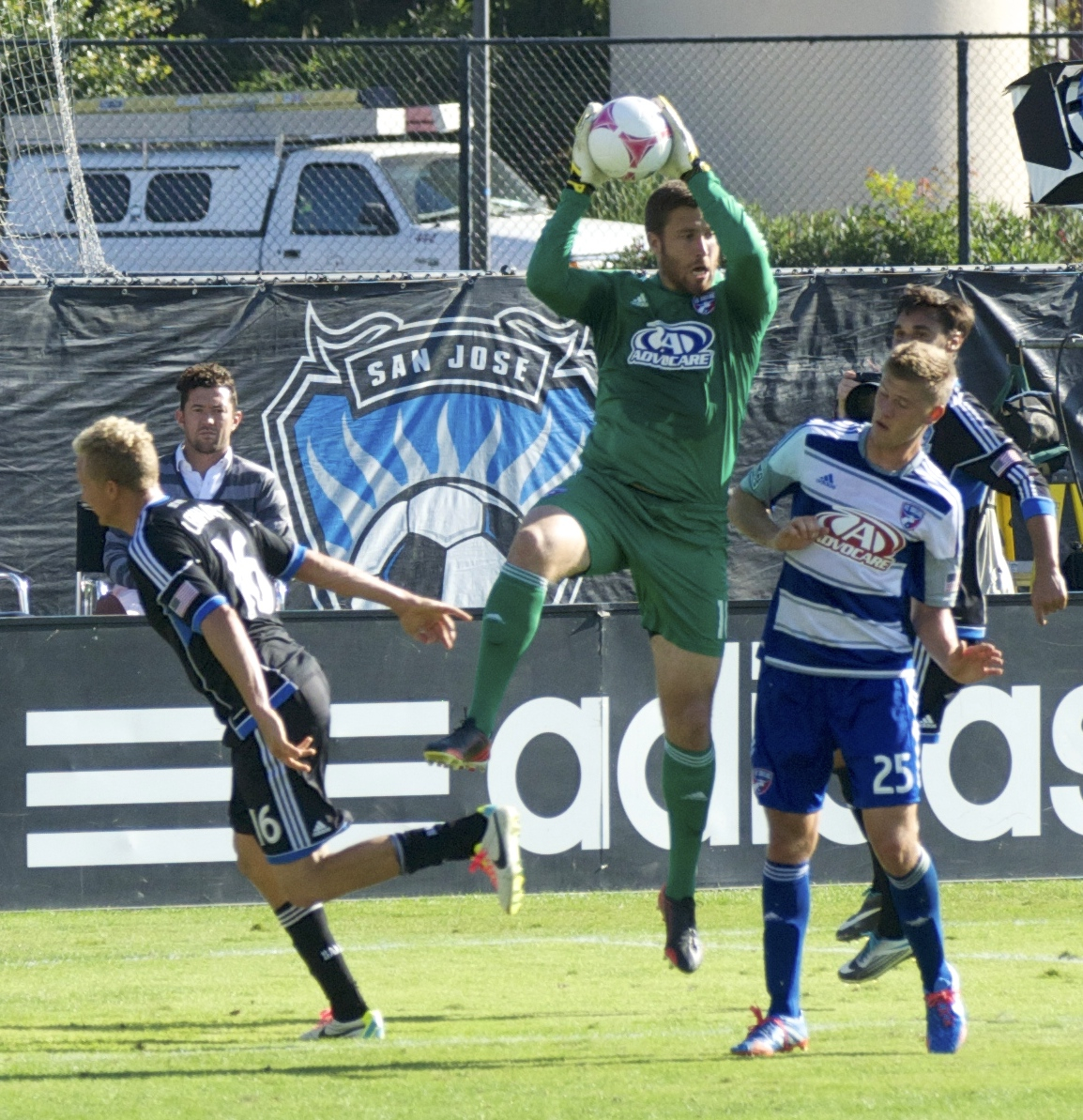
Catching a cross vs San Jose

Seitz spent the first 22 games of Philadelphia's inaugural 2010 season as the Union's starter, before being dropped to the bench behind Brad Knighton. He posted a 1.80 goals against average, worst in the league for players with more than one start in goal. The Union did not extend his contract, making him available for the two stages of the 2010 MLS Re-Entry Draft after the 2010 season.

=== FC Dallas ===
Seitz was selected by Seattle Sounders FC in the second stage of the 2010 Re-Entry Draft. A contract was agreed with Seattle, and he was immediately traded to FC Dallas in exchange for a fourth-round pick in the 2012 MLS SuperDraft.

Seitz started one game for FC Dallas in 2011, allowing four goals in a 4–2 loss to the San Jose Earthquakes. In 2012, due to an injury to Kevin Hartman, who was dealing with back spasms, Seitz started against Vancouver Whitecaps FC in a 0–1 loss for Dallas. Seitz started the next two games until Hartman was able to play again.

Seitz put his soccer career on hold for a brief time in September 2012, despite having no guaranteed contract for the upcoming 2013 season, when he elected to donate bone marrow to save the life of a stranger for whose bone marrow he was a match. Because of this act, he was later named the 2012 MLS Humanitarian of the Year.

Seitz continued to be primarily a backup goalkeeper for Dallas until the 2016 season, when he would start a career-high 28 MLS matches. He would contribute to the team winning two major trophies: The Supporters' Shield and the Lamar Hunt U.S. Open Cup.

=== Houston Dynamo ===
Seitz joined Houston Dynamo on December 15, 2017, as a free agent. He started the first five games of the 2018 season before losing his starting spot to Joe Willis. He started three games in the 2018 Open Cup, keeping two clean sheets. The Dynamo would go on to win the Open Cup for the first time in club history.

=== D.C. United ===
In January 2019, Seitz was traded to D.C. United in exchange for a second-round pick in the 2019 MLS SuperDraft. Seitz didn't receive much playing time, serving as the second goalkeeper choice after Bill Hamid. He made his first start for D.C. United on July 18, 2019, in a 4–1 win against FC Cincinnati. He made 3 appearances across all competitions for D.C. United in 2019, while also making an appearance for their USL Championship affiliate Loudoun United. Seitz's contract was renewed after the 2019 season.

Seitz appeared in 6 of D.C. United's 23 games in a shortened 2020 season due to the COVID-19 pandemic, keeping 2 clean sheets. D.C. finished the season 13th in the Eastern Conference, failing to qualify for the playoffs. He was re-signed after the 2020 season to a one-year contract.

Seitz made 4 appearances during the 2021 season as D.C. United finished 8th in the East, 1 point and 1 place out of the playoffs.

Following the 2021 season, Seitz left D.C. United. Seitz later announced his retirement from professional soccer on his personal Twitter account, on January 19, 2022.

== International ==
Seitz earned his first full international call up for the game against Brazil on September 9, 2007, but did not see any playing time. He previously started games for the U-23 squad in the CONCACAF Pre-Olympic qualification tournament prior to the 2008 Olympic Games and was on the roster for the 2008 Summer Olympic soccer tournament.

== Career statistics ==
As of March 9, 2022

Club	Season	League			US Open Cup		Playoffs (Note: Appearances in MLS Cup Playoffs and USL Playoffs)		Continental		Total	
Club	Season	Division	Apps	Goals	Apps	Goals	Apps	Goals	Apps	Goals	Apps	Goals
Real Salt Lake	2007	MLS	3	0	—		—		—		3	0
Real Salt Lake	2008	MLS	0	0	—		0	0	—		0	0
Real Salt Lake	2009	MLS	4	0	—		0	0	—		4	0
Real Salt Lake	Total		7	0	0	0	0	0	0	0	7	0
Cleveland City (loan)	2009	USL First Division	1	0	0	0	—		—		1	0
Portland Timbers (loan)	2009	USL First Division	2	0	0	0	0	0	—		2	0
Philadelphia Union	2010	MLS	23	0	—		—		—		23	0
FC Dallas	2011	MLS	1	0	0	0	0	0	0	0	1	0
FC Dallas	2012	MLS	4	0	1	0	—		—		5	0
FC Dallas	2013	MLS	8	0	3	0	—		—		11	0
FC Dallas	2014	MLS	14	0	2	0	2	0	—		18	0
FC Dallas	2015	MLS	7	0	2	0	0	0	—		9	0
FC Dallas	2016	MLS	28	0	3	0	2	0	—		33	0
FC Dallas	2017	MLS	5	0	2	0	—		4	0	11	0
FC Dallas	Total		67	0	13	0	4	0	4	0	88	0
Houston Dynamo	2018	MLS	6	0	3	0	—		—		9	0
RGVFC Toros (loan)	2018	USL	1	0	—		—		—		1	0
D.C. United	2019	MLS	1	0	2	0	0	0	—		3	0
D.C. United	2020	MLS	6	0	—		—		—		6	0
D.C. United	2021	MLS	4	0	—		—		—		4	0
D.C. United	Total		11	0	2	0	0	0	0	0	13	0
Loudoun United	2019	USLC	1	0	—		—		—		1	0
Career totals			119	0	18	0	4	0	4	0	145	0

== Honors ==
Real Salt Lake

- Major League Soccer MLS Cup (1): 2009
- Major League Soccer Eastern Conference Championship (1): 2009

FC Dallas

- Lamar Hunt U.S. Open Cup (1): 2016
- Supporters' Shield (1): 2016

Houston Dynamo

- Lamar Hunt U.S. Open Cup (1): 2018

=== Individual ===
- MLS Humanitarian of the Year Award (1): 2012
