= Matias Mantilla =

Argentine footballer

Personal information
- Full name: Matias Ezequiel Mantilla
- Date of birth: 14 February 1981 (age 45)
- Place of birth: Buenos Aires, Argentina
- Height: 1.73 m (5 ft 8 in)
- Position: Defender

Senior career*
Years	Team	Apps	(Gls)
2000–2003	Argentinos Juniors	17	(2)
2003–2004	Huracán	15	(2)
2005–2007	Defensores de Belgrano	61	(2)
2007–2008	Real Salt Lake	17	(1)
2009	Independiente Rivadavia	11	(0)
- * Club domestic league appearances and goals

Matias Ezequiel Mantilla (born 14 February 1981) is an Argentine footballer.

Mantilla started his career in 2000 with Argentinos Juniors in the Primera Division Argentina. In 2002 the club were relegated, but Mantilla stayed with them until his move to Club Atlético Huracán in 2003. He moved down another division in 2005 to play for Defensores de Belgrano in the Argentine third tier. Mantilla was acquired by Real Salt Lake in 2007 at the same time as fellow Argentines Fabian Espindola and Javier Morales, where he scored one goal in 17 Major League Soccer appearances. He was waived by Real Salt Lake in August 2008, and then signed with Independiente Rivadavia.
