= Nikolas Besagno =

American soccer player

Personal information
- Full name: Nikolas Besagno
- Date of birth: November 15, 1988 (age 37)
- Place of birth: Maple Valley, Washington, United States
- Height: 6 ft 0 in (1.83 m)
- Position: Midfielder

Team information
- Current team: Washington Crossfire (manager)

Youth career
- 2004–2005: IMG Soccer Academy

Senior career*
Years	Team	Apps	(Gls)
2005–2008	Real Salt Lake	8	(0)
2008	→ Seattle Sounders (loan)	10	(0)
2009	Tacoma Tide	15	(2)
2010–2011	Kitsap Pumas	27	(4)
2012–2013	Washington Crossfire	14	(1)

International career^{‡}
2005	United States U17	2	(0)

Managerial career
- 2013–: Washington Crossfire
- * Club domestic league appearances and goals as of June 1, 2013 ‡ National team caps and goals as of May 13, 2009

Nikolas Besagno (born November 15, 1988) is an American former soccer player who is currently the manager of Washington Crossfire of the USL Premier Development League.

== Career ==
=== Professional ===
One of the most touted young players in the country, Besagno became the first overall pick of the 2005 MLS SuperDraft when he was drafted by his former United States Under-17 coach and then Salt Lake boss John Ellinger. At the age of 16, Besagno, who signed a Generation Adidas contract with MLS, became the second-youngest player in league history to be drafted, behind 2004's number one overall choice, 14-year-old Freddy Adu. In June 2008, Real Salt Lake loaned Besagno for ninety days to the Seattle Sounders of the USL First Division. His older brother Jacob Besagno had previously spent two seasons with Seattle.

On November 24, 2008, Besagno was released by Real Salt Lake. Besagno started 2009 in camp with Seattle Sounders FC, but was cut toward the end of January. Having been unable to secure a professional contract, Besagno signed with Tacoma Tide of the USL Premier Development League for the 2009 season. Besagno was playing for PDL rival. On January 1, 2013, Besagno retired. Washington Crossfire.

=== International ===
Besagno, a graduate of the Bradenton Academy, was a regular for the Under-17 United States national team, and later moved up to the Under-20 squad. In 2005, he played two games for the USA U-17 team at the 2005 FIFA U-17 World Championship.
