= Kevin Novak =

American soccer player

Personal information
- Full name: Kevin Christopher Novak
- Date of birth: September 1, 1982 (age 44)
- Place of birth: Huntington Beach, California, United States
- Height: 5 ft 8 in (1.73 m)
- Position: Defender

Youth career
- 2000–03: Loyola Marymount

Senior career*
Years	Team	Apps	(Gls)
2005–06	Real Salt Lake	29	(1)
2007	Rochester Raging Rhinos	22	(0)
- * Club domestic league appearances and goals

Kevin Novak (born September 1, 1982, in Los Angeles, California) is an American soccer defender, who played two seasons for Real Salt Lake in Major League Soccer and one for the Rochester Raging Rhinos of the USL First Division.

Novak grew up in southern California, attending Mater Dei High School in Santa Ana. He then attended Loyola Marymount University, majoring in finance and marketing. He played soccer at Loyola Marymount from 2000 to 2003. In four seasons he appeared in 60 matches, scoring 23 goals. He graduated in 2004.

Although he missed the 2004 MLS SuperDraft due to a knee injury, he spent the year rehabilitating and training. In January 2005 he was noticed at an open tryout for Real Salt Lake of Major League Soccer. He was invited to Salt Lake's training camp and on March 28, 2005, he signed a developmental contract. He made few appearances during 2005, but became a regular for the team in 2006. Novak was released by Real Salt Lake during the 2007 pre-season, having been dogged by injuries and his relative lack of size during his MLS career. On April 6, 2007, Novak signed with the Rochester Rhinos of the USL First Division. He retired at the end of the 2007 season.

After retiring from playing, Novak returned to school at Boston University where he attended the Questrom School of Business and graduated with an MBA degree. He currently works as a performance analyst for State Street Corporation in Boston, Massachusetts.
