= Willis Forko =

Liberian footballer (1983–2021)

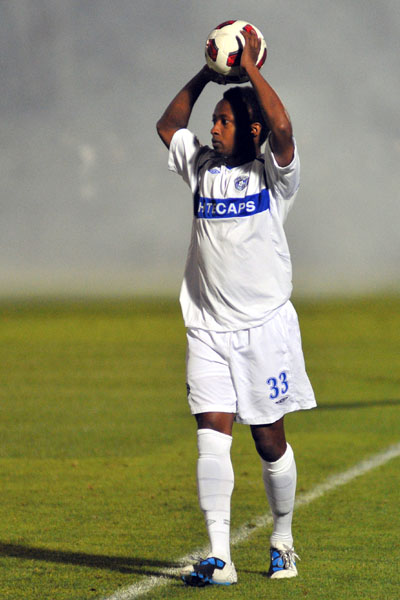

Personal information
- Date of birth: 12 November 1983
- Place of birth: Monrovia, Liberia
- Date of death: 8 November 2021 (aged 37)
- Place of death: Houston, Texas, United States
- Height: 5 ft 10 in (1.78 m)
- Position: Left-back

College career
Years	Team	Apps	(Gls)
2002	South Carolina Gamecocks		
2003–2005	UConn Huskies		

Senior career*
Years	Team	Apps	(Gls)
2006–2007	Real Salt Lake	38	(0)
2008	Vancouver Whitecaps	0	(0)
2008–2010	Bodø/Glimt	60	(0)
2010	Vancouver Whitecaps	5	(0)
2012	Houston Rangers		

International career
2008	Liberia	1	(0)
- * Club domestic league appearances and goals

Willis Forko (12 November 1983 – 8 November 2021) was a Liberian professional footballer who played as a left-back.

== Career ==
=== Youth and college ===
Although born in Liberia, Forko and his family moved to Houston, Texas when he was three years old. Willis attended Cy-Springs High School in Cypress, TX where he graduated in 2002. He began his collegiate soccer career at the University of South Carolina in 2002. He played one season there before transferring to the University of Connecticut. At UConn he appeared in 65 matches, notching three goals and 15 assists, and was twice named to the Third Team All Big East.

=== Professional ===
Forko was selected in the second round, 14th overall, of the 2006 MLS Supplemental Draft by Real Salt Lake. He went on to play 38 games for RSL in their first two seasons in Major League Soccer, before leaving the club at the end of the 2007 season.

Forko signed with the Vancouver Whitecaps of the USL First Division in 2008, but a month after signing with the Whitecaps, it was announced that Forko had been transferred to the Norwegian Premier League side FK Bodø/Glimt. He went on to spend two seasons playing in the Tippeligaen, making 60 appearances for the team.

Forko returned to Vancouver in 2010 with hopes of joining the club in its move to the Major League Soccer in 2011. He made his first appearance for the Whitecaps on August 29, 2010, in a 2–2 tie with the Austin Aztex.

Forko died in Houston on 8 November 2021, four days before what would have been his 38th birthday.

== Personal life ==
Forko's older brother, Sam Forko, played in Major League Soccer for the MetroStars in 2003.
