= Javier Morales =

Argentine footballer and coach

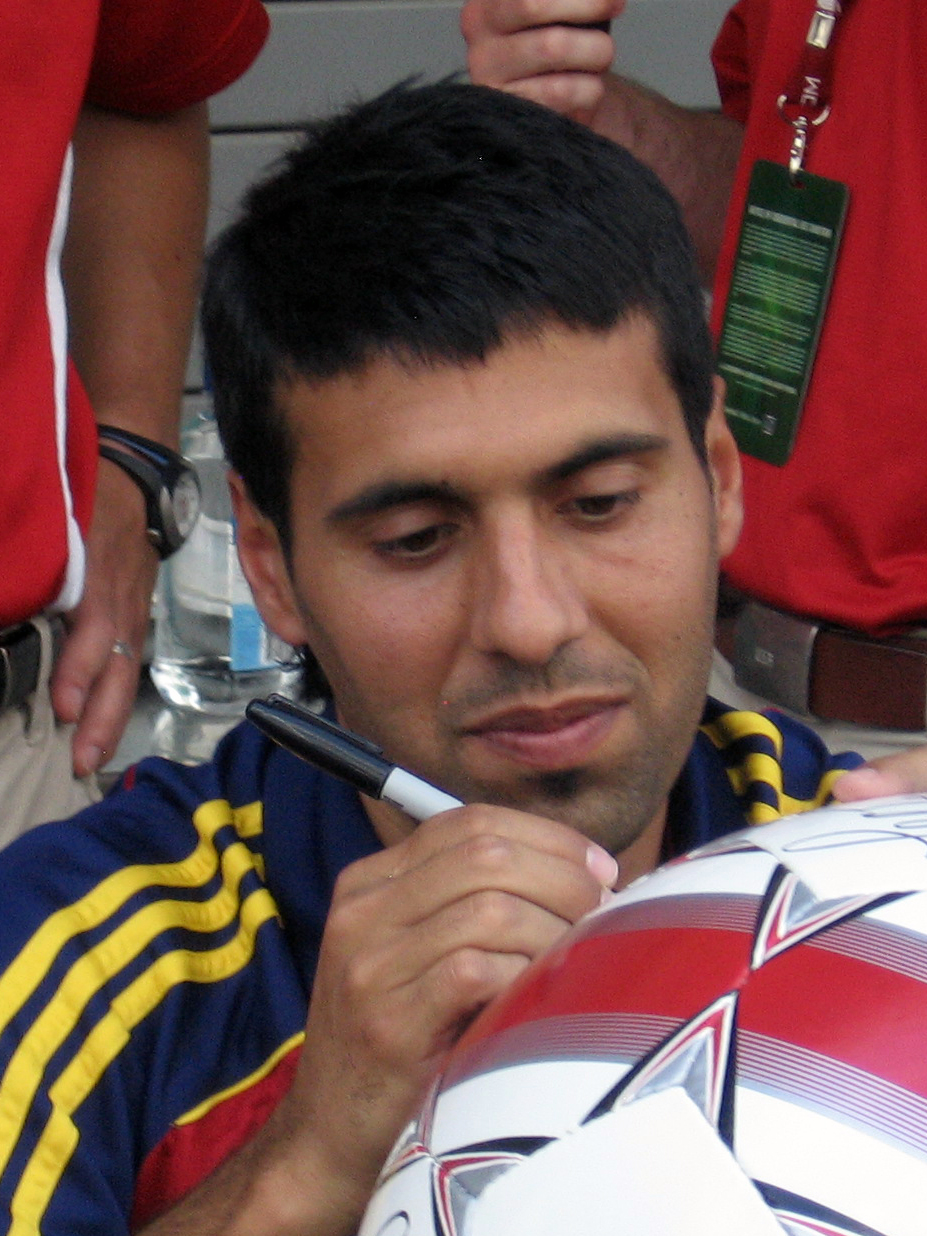
- Morales in 2010

Personal information
- Full name: Javier Damián Morales
- Date of birth: January 10, 1980 (age 46)
- Place of birth: Buenos Aires, Argentina
- Height: 5 ft 9 in (1.75 m)
- Position: Attacking midfielder

Team information
- Current team: Inter Miami CF (assistant manager)

Senior career*
Years	Team	Apps	(Gls)
1998–2000	Lanús	20	(0)
2000–2003	Arsenal de Sarandí	102	(14)
2003	Lanús	9	(0)
2004	Newell's Old Boys	11	(1)
2004–2005	Arsenal de Sarandí	44	(1)
2006	Instituto	14	(0)
2006–2007	Vecindario	23	(5)
2007–2016	Real Salt Lake	240	(49)
2017	FC Dallas	15	(1)
Total		478	(71)

Managerial career
- 2023: Inter Miami (interim)
- 2023–: Inter Miami (assistant)
- * Club domestic league appearances and goals

Javier Morales (born 10 January 1980) is an Argentine professional football coach and former player who is currently assistant manager of Major League Soccer club Inter Miami.

== Career ==
=== Argentina ===
From 1998 to 2006, Morales played for four different clubs in the Argentine Primera División, including two stints each with Lanús and Arsenal de Sarandí. He spent most of that time with Avellaneda-based Arsenal, playing in 146 matches and scoring 15 goals for the club. He spent his last season in Argentina with Instituto before moving to Spain.

=== Spain ===
Morales spent the 2006–07 season with Vecindario of the Spanish Segunda División. In one lone season with the club, he scored five goals in 23 matches (20 starts).

=== United States ===
In August 2007, Morales moved to the United States to play for Real Salt Lake of Major League Soccer. Morales was acquired by Real Salt Lake at the same time as fellow Argentines Matias Mantilla and Fabián Espíndola. Morales made an immediate impact for RSL, tallying an assist 40 seconds into his MLS debut (August 29 vs. the Kansas City Wizards). His first career goal for RSL came September 19 against the LA Galaxy. He finished the season with one goal and two assists in seven matches (five starts).

In his second season with RSL (2008), Morales emerged as a star player and team leader. He started 29 of Real Salt Lake's 30 contests, totaling 6 goals (tied with Robbie Findley for second-highest on the team, just behind Yura Movsisyan). Morales tallied 15 assists, shattering the club record of 11 set by Jeff Cunningham in 2006. It was the second-highest total in the MLS that season, behind only league MVP Guillermo Barros Schelotto of the Columbus Crew. His outstanding play guided RSL to the club's first-ever appearance in the MLS Cup playoffs, where Morales figured in all three of the team's postseason goals, scoring one and assisting on two as RSL advanced to the 2008 Western Conference Final.

During the offseason, Morales signed a contract extension to keep him in Salt Lake until 2012. In 2009, he continued as one of RSL's top players, although his numbers declined somewhat. His play has been solid enough to earn him a selection in the 2009 MLS All-Star Game. Already a fan favorite, Morales scored a spectacular goal in the team's 1-0 exhibition victory over Club América on July 11. Morales started off the 2010 MLS season with a bang, tallying two goals and an assist against the San Jose Earthquakes.

On May 7, 2011, in a game against Chivas USA, Morales suffered a fracture-dislocation in his left ankle after a challenge from Marcos Mondaini. He was out for over four months, returning to play on September 28, 2011.

Morales announced that he would leave Real Salt Lake on November 3, 2016, having tallied more assists than any player in club history. He signed as a free agent with FC Dallas on December 27, 2016.

On April 12, 2018, Morales officially announced his retirement from playing professional football.

== Coaching ==
Upon retirement, Morales became coach of the FC Dallas Under-13 academy team, guiding the team to an international championship at the Copa Rayados Internacional tournament in Mexico.

On February 19, 2019, he was named Academy Coach at Inter Miami.

On June 1, 2023, Morales was appointed interim head coach of Inter Miami after the firing of Phil Neville.

== Personal life ==
Morales holds a U.S. green card which qualified him as a domestic player for MLS roster purposes.

== Honors ==
=== Club ===
Real Salt Lake

- MLS Cup: 2009
- Western Conference playoffs: 2013

Individual

- MLS All-Star (2): 2009, 2010
- MLS Best XI: 2010
- MLS 50/50 Club
