= Andy Williams (Jamaican footballer) =

Canadian-born Jamaican footballer (born 1977)

Personal information
- Full name: Andrew Williams
- Date of birth: 23 September 1977 (age 49)
- Place of birth: Toronto, Ontario, Canada
- Height: 5 ft 8 in (1.73 m)
- Position: Right midfielder

Youth career
- 1994–1997: Rhode Island Rams

Senior career*
Years	Team	Apps	(Gls)
1997	Real Mona F.C.		
1998	Harbour View		
1998–1999	Columbus Crew	41	(1)
2000	Miami Fusion	20	(4)
2001–2002	New England Revolution	25	(3)
2002	MetroStars	19	(2)
2003–2004	Chicago Fire	49	(6)
2005–2011	Real Salt Lake	189	(14)

International career^{‡}
1997–2008	Jamaica	107	(22)
- * Club domestic league appearances and goals as of 7 November 2011 ‡ National team caps and goals as of 29 January 2022

Andrew Williams (born 23 September 1977) is a Canadian-Jamaican retired footballer who last played as a midfielder for Real Salt Lake in Major League Soccer.

== Career ==
=== College ===
Williams played college soccer for the University of Rhode Island where he remains the team's all-time leading scorer, with 52 goals and 45 assists.

Williams is one of 22 college players to be part of the 40-40 club, having both 40 goals and 40 assists in their college career. As of 2018, he is the most recent member of the 40-40 club.

=== Professional ===
After spending a couple of years in his home country with Real Mona, Williams joined Major League Soccer in 1998 with the Columbus Crew, with whom he would play for two seasons. In 2000, he moved to the Miami Fusion, but would only remain there one year before going to the New England Revolution. Williams played in 2001 and beginning of 2002 with New England, before moving to the MetroStars in a six-player deal in the middle of the 2002 season. He only lasted half a season with the Metros, soon traded again, to the Chicago Fire, with whom he played for two years.

Williams became the second player in Real Salt Lake history when he was their first selection in the 2004 MLS Expansion Draft. He became the first player in MLS history to play for six teams. In his ten years in the league, Williams has scored 27 goals and added 78 assists. After leading Jamaica to the Caribbean title in 2008, Williams suffered through the prolonged illness of his wife during the 2009 season, which culminated with Real Salt Lake winning the MLS Cup in November 2009. The Williams family received further good news in late 2009/early 2010 as Marcia Williams' cancer went into remission. In 2010, Williams returned to Real Salt Lake focused and re-energized.

Williams' contract with Real Salt Lake ended after the 2011 season and he opted to participate in the 2011 MLS Re-Entry Draft. After he was not selected in Stage 1 of the draft, Williams announced his retirement from professional soccer on 5 December 2011.

In 2014 Andy Williams joined the coaching staff for Real Salt Lake when new head coach, Jeff Cassar, named him as an assistant coach (Midfield coach) and in addition to his assistant coach duties. Andy oversaw and coached the reserve team for Real Salt Lake. Williams became Head Scout at Real Salt Lake, and has since played an integral part in the signings of several players.

=== International ===
Despite being something of a journeyman in Major League Soccer, Williams has been a stalwart for the Jamaica national team. He has 97 caps with the team and 13 goals, and was often the focal point of their offense, running the team from the central midfield. Williams played for his country in the 1998 FIFA World Cup, making one substitute appearance. Williams retired from the Jamaican team following their failure to qualify for the 2006 FIFA World Cup. Despite his initial retirement, Williams was called in for a June 2008 friendly vs. Saint Vincent and the Grenadines, in which he played the full 90. Williams was also called in for Jamaica's 2010 World Cup qualifying campaign and played five games, scoring against Canada in a 1–1 draw.

Scores and results list Jamaica's goal tally first, score column indicates score after each Williams goal.

List of international goals scored by Andy Williams
No.	Date	Venue	Opponent	Score	Result	Competition	Ref.
1	21 February 1997	National Stadium, Kingston, Jamaica	Bermuda	1-0	1-0	1997 Caribbean Cup qualification	
2	11 May 1997	Estadio Ricardo Saprissa Aymá, San José, Costa Rica	Costa Rica	1-1	1-3	1998 FIFA World Cup qualification	
3	18 May 1997	National Stadium, Kingston, Jamaica	El Salvador	1-0	1-0	1998 FIFA World Cup qualification	
4	8 February 1998	Los Angeles Memorial Coliseum, Los Angeles, United States of America	Guatemala	2-1	3-2	1998 CONCACAF Gold Cup	
5	22 February 1998	National Stadium, Kingston, Jamaica	Nigeria	2-1	2-2	Friendly	
6	16 January 2000	Tianhe Stadium, Guangzhou, China	New Zealand	2-1	2-1	2000 Four Nations Tournament	
7	3 September 2000	National Stadium, Kingston, Jamaica	Saint Vincent and the Grenadines	1-0	2-0	2002 FIFA World Cup qualification	
8	26 January 2001	Orange Bowl, Miami, United States of America	Bolivia	3-0	3-0	Friendly	
9	15 May 2001	Larry Gomes Stadium, Arima, Trinidad and Tobago	Martinique	1-0	1-0	2001 Caribbean Cup	
10	10 June 2001	National Stadium, Kingston, Jamaica	Cuba	3-1	4-1	Friendly	
11	26 March 2003	National Stadium, Kingston, Jamaica	Saint Lucia	1-0	5-0	2003 CONCACAF Gold Cup qualification	
12	25 May 2003	National Stadium, Kingston, Jamaica	Nigeria	3-2	3-2	Friendly	
13	15 July 2003	Orange Bowl, Miami, United States of America	Guatemala	2-0	2-0	2003 CONCACAF Gold Cup	
14	28 April 2004	National Stadium, Kingston, Jamaica	Venezuela	2-1	2-1	Friendly	
15	17 November 2004	Columbus Crew Stadium, Columbus, United States of America	United States	1-1	1-1	2006 FIFA World Cup qualification	
16	26 November 2004	National Stadium, Kingston, Jamaica	U.S. Virgin Islands	5-0	11-1	2005 Caribbean Cup qualification	
17	20 February 2005	Barbados National Stadium, Saint Michael, Barbados	Trinidad and Tobago	2-0	2-1	2005 Caribbean Cup	
18	22 February 2005	Barbados National Stadium, Saint Michael, Barbados	Barbados	1-0	1-0	2005 Caribbean Cup	
19	8 July 2005	Home Depot Center, Carson, United States of America	Guatemala	3-2	4-3	2005 CONCACAF Gold Cup	
20	20 August 2008	BMO Field, Toronto, Canada	Canada	1-1	1-1	2010 FIFA World Cup qualification	
21	5 December 2008	Jarrett Park, Montego Bay, Jamaica	Grenada	3-0	4-0	2008 Caribbean Cup	

== Personal life ==
Andy Williams was born in Toronto, Ontario, Canada, but grew up in Kingston, Jamaica. His father, Bobby Williams, played for the Jamaica national team in the 1960s. He married Shauna Williams on April 24, 2021.

== Honors ==
=== Real Salt Lake ===
- Major League Soccer MLS Cup (1): 2009
- Major League Soccer Eastern Conference Championship (1): 2009

=== Chicago Fire ===
- MLS Supporters' Shield Supporters Shield (1): 2003
- Lamar Hunt U.S. Open Cup (1): 2003

=== Jamaica ===
- Caribbean Cup:
  - Winner (2): 2005, 2008

== See also ==
- List of men's footballers with 100 or more international caps
