= John Ellinger =

Football manager (born 1951)

Personal information
- Full name: John Ellinger
- Date of birth: October 4, 1951 (age 75)
- Place of birth: Baltimore, Maryland, U.S.
- Position: Midfielder

College career
| Years | Team | Apps | (Gls) |
| 1969–1973 | Frostburg State Bobcats | | |

Managerial career
- 1979–1981: Montgomery College (assistant)
- 1981–1990: UMBC Retrievers
- 1990–1997: United States (assistant)
- 1997–2005: United States U17
- 2005–2007: Real Salt Lake
- 2008–2012: FC Dallas (assistant)

John Ellinger (born October 4, 1951) is an American former soccer coach of the Under-17 United States men's national soccer team, and former head coach of Real Salt Lake of Major League Soccer.

Ellinger played collegiately at Frostburg State University, graduating in 1973. He also played club ball with the Washington Soccer Club at the start of his coaching career.

After graduating from Frostburg State University, Ellinger taught physical education at Sherwood High School in Sandy Spring, MD, where he coached a number of sports, including soccer. During this time, Tony Stevens, President and Founder of the Olney Soccer Club, served as an early mentor for Ellinger, helping to expand his sophisticated understanding of the game. Ellinger also served as the varsity wrestling coach at John F. Kennedy High School in Silver Spring, Maryland for the 1988–89 season.

Ellinger was Tom Bichy's assistant at Montgomery College from 1979 to 1981, where the team achieved a No. 5 national ranking. He left Montgomery to coach at the University of Maryland, Baltimore County, where he stayed from 1981 to 1990.

Ellinger became a U.S. Soccer National Staff Coach in 1992, and has held a number of different jobs since then. Most notably, he has been the coach of the U-17 United States men's national soccer team since 1997, and Director of Youth Development since 2001. In his role as coach of the U-17's, Ellinger has also headed up the USSF's Bradenton Academy, where many of the United States's most talented youths are developed. While at Bradenton, Ellinger had a significant role in developing many of the most outstanding of American soccer players, including Landon Donovan, DaMarcus Beasley, Bobby Convey, Edward Johnson, Chad Marshall, Freddy Adu, Eddie Gaven, Danny Szetela, and Jonathan Spector.

In 2005, he joined Real Salt Lake to become the new expansion team's first coach. Previously, Ellinger had one season of professional coaching experience as an assistant coach for the Columbus Crew in its inaugural 1996 season.

On May 3, 2007, he was replaced as RSL's head coach after two losing seasons, followed by a win less start in the first month of his third year. Ellinger's overall record with the club was 15–37–16.

After losing his coaching position, he was retained by RSL as the club's technical director and director of soccer operations, where he remained until September 2007.

Ellinger became an assistant coach at FC Dallas of Major League Soccer on June 19, 2008. Head Coach Schellas Hyndman indicated he valued Ellinger's previous experience coaching in MLS. On November 15, 2012, FC Dallas announced Ellinger's retirement. During his time as an assistant coach at FC Dallas the team compiled a 53-46-47 record. The best record of the team during that time was in 2010 with a 3rd-place finish in the Western Conference on a 12-4-14 record and runner-up in the 2010 MLS Cup final.
