= Real Salt Lake =

American professional soccer club based in Salt Lake City

- Nicknames: Claret and Cobalt
- Short name: RSL
- Founded: July 14, 2004; 22 years ago
- Stadium: America First Field; Sandy, Utah
- Capacity: 20,213
- Owners: Miller Sports + Entertainment (Gail Miller)
- Head coach: Pablo Mastroeni
- League: Major League Soccer
- 2026: Western Conference: 9th; Overall: 18th; Playoffs: TBD
- Website: rsl.com
Home colors	Away colors	Third colors

Real Salt Lake (RSL) is an American professional soccer club based in the Salt Lake City metropolitan area. The club competes in Major League Soccer (MLS) as a member of the Western Conference. Founded in 2004, the club began play in 2005 as an expansion team.

The club plays its home games at America First Field, a soccer-specific stadium located in city of Sandy, Utah, which they share with their sister team, Utah Royals FC. Before moving to America First Field, RSL previously played home games at Rice-Eccles Stadium, located on the campus of the University of Utah, from 2005 to 2007. The team is currently led by head coach Pablo Mastroeni.

Real Salt Lake won the 2009 MLS Cup, then finished as runners-up in the 2010 Supporters Shield and in both the 2013 U.S. Open Cup and 2013 MLS Cup. The club additionally finished runners-up in the 2010–11 CONCACAF Champions League, becoming the first American club to reach the final under the tournament's group stage format. Their fully owned USL affiliate, Real Monarchs, won the USL Championship, the second division in American soccer, in 2019.

== Name ==
The Spanish title Real (Spanish pronunciation: [reˈal]), meaning "royal" in English, has been used since the early 20th century by Spanish soccer clubs who have received royal patronage from a reigning monarch—most notably Madrid, Zaragoza, Betis and Sociedad. In choosing the name Real for the Salt Lake-based team, initial owner Dave Checketts intended to create a brand name that would become well known for its simplicity, followed the European-style naming conventions of the league, and would potentially foster a partnership with Real Madrid—admired both because of their successful soccer history and close association with basketball (similar to Checketts' own history with Utah's NBA team).

The Real Salt Lake name was initially met with skepticism, with it being accused of contrivance. Other suggested team names, such as "Highlanders", "Salt Lake SC", or "Union SLC", were initially preferred for the club by locals. However, by at least 2014, reaction to the name had drastically improved, with the team establishing an identity representative of the Salt Lake community.

== History ==
=== Early years (2005–2008) ===
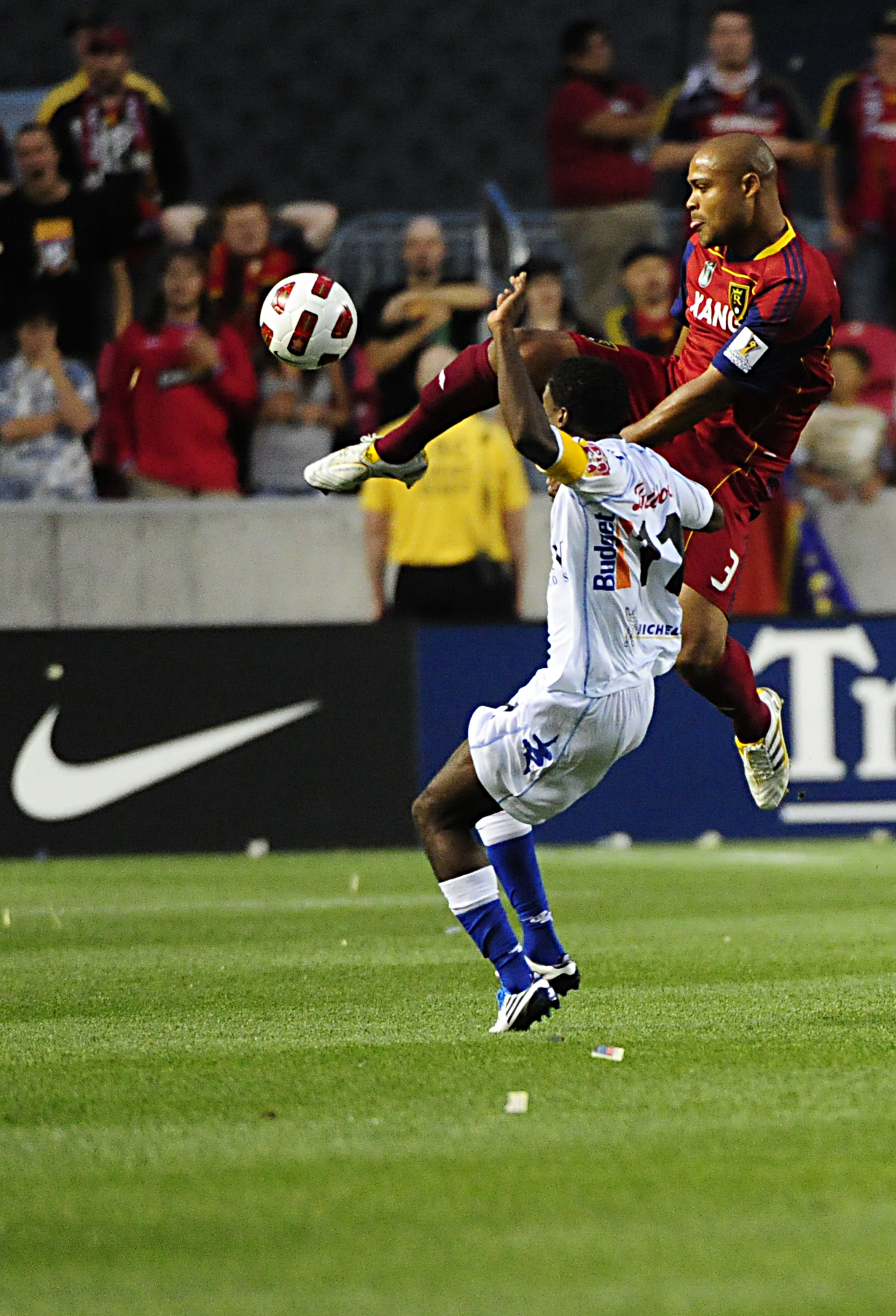
Robbie Russell (in red) playing for Real Salt Lake

Real Salt Lake became the twelfth MLS team when Major League Soccer awarded an expansion franchise on July 14, 2004, to SCP Worldwide, headed by Dave Checketts. United States U-17's coach John Ellinger was named as the initial manager of the club, with forward Jason Kreis becoming the club's first player. RSL began play on April 2, 2005, in a match against the MetroStars at Giants Stadium that ended as a scoreless draw; Kreis would score the team's first ever goal the following game on the road against the LA Galaxy. The club's first ever home match, and victory, would occur on April 16 in front of 25,287 fans at Rice-Eccles Stadium, with defender Brian Dunseth securing a victory over Rocky Mountain Cup rival Colorado Rapids.

However, both the 2005 and 2006 seasons would prove to be relative disappointments for the club. Despite strong performances from key players Kreis, Eddie Pope, Andy Williams, and Jeff Cunningham, RSL would embark on a 10-game losing streak in the former and an 18-game winless run in the latter, finishing each season among the worst teams in the league.

The 2007 season began with the club making moves for veteran talent to build around, most notably bringing in goalkeeper Nick Rimando and midfielder Kyle Beckerman pre-season. However, following continued poor form, Ellinger was fired in May and unexpectedly replaced as head coach by Kreis, who immediately retired as a player to take the role.

The 2008 season saw the club begin to achieve successes, finishing with an even record and qualifying for the MLS Playoffs for the first time. The season additionally saw the opening of America First Field, a soccer-specific stadium for the club in Sandy. The club advanced past Chivas USA in the first round of the playoffs before losing to the New York Red Bulls in the Western Conference final.

=== MLS and CONCACAF success (2009–2012) ===
The 2009 season saw the club post a near-perfect home record to propel itself into a playoff-qualification battle, won on the final day against the Colorado Rapids. Seeded as the lowest Eastern Conference team (due to the playoff format of the time), RSL progressed through the playoffs to the 2009 MLS Cup, where they defeated the LA Galaxy in a penalty shootout to win their first championship.

As defending champions, RSL had its best season to date in 2010, posting a 25-game winning streak on the way to a second-place finish in the MLS Supporters Shield standings. Rimando finished as the league's best goalkeeper, with Olave named as MLS Defender of the Year and newly acquired forward Álvaro Saborío establishing himself as a primary goal scorer. The group stages of the Champions League saw the club finish first.

The remainder of the 2011 season saw an end to the home unbeaten streak at 29 games, but successful re-qualifications to both the playoffs and CONCACAF Champions League. This was followed by a second-place Western Conference finish in 2012, as well as a group-stage elimination in the 2012-13 CONCACAF Champions League.

=== Hansen ownership (2013–2021) ===
In 2013, Checketts sold his stake in the club to minority owner Dell Loy Hansen. The season saw the departure of key players Olave, Espindola, and Johnson; however, the club garnered another second place Western Conference finish, as well as trips to both the 2013 MLS Cup and 2013 U.S. Open Cup final, where the team lost to Sporting Kansas City and D.C. United, respectively. Following the season, Kreis left the club to coach expansion side New York City FC, with assistant coach Jeff Cassar replacing him; despite this, the club finished with a then-high points total of 56 points in 2014, qualifying for CONCACAF before being eliminated early in the playoffs.

2015 saw the departures of Borchers and Saborío, which led to the team failing to qualify for the playoffs for the first time since 2007. A push to the quarterfinals of the 2015-16 CONCACAF Champions League helped contribute to a stronger 2016 season and brief return to the playoffs. However, this season saw even further departures, with Morales and Olave leaving the club following 2016.

A poor start to the 2017 season saw Cassar dismissed as head coach, with Mike Petke taking over the position in April – however, despite a late-season run, the team failed to make the playoffs. 2018 saw improvements on the field, as the club finished sixth in the conference led by strong performances from Albert Rusnák and Damir Kreilach. However, the season was primarily focused on the opening of the Real Academy and Zions Bank Stadium in Herriman, which provided a new home for the club, the NWSL's Utah Royals FC, reserve side Real Monarchs, and the club's youth academies.

2019 saw the final seasons of both Rimando and long-time defender Tony Beltran. Both retired at the end of the season. The club also saw the dismissal of head coach Petke on August 11, following an incident with match officials during the 2019 Leagues Cup. Initially named interim manager for the remainder of the season, assistant coach Freddy Juarez was eventually named as head coach following the season.

The 2020 season, significantly shortened by the COVID-19 pandemic, nonetheless saw announcement that Hansen would sell his stakes in Real Salt Lake, Utah Royals FC, and Real Monarchs following controversy over his past use of racist language. Additionally, long-time club captain – and final remaining member of the 2009 MLS Cup winning side – Beckerman retired following the season's end, having played more regular season games than any outfield player in MLS history.

=== Blitzer and Smith ownership (2022–2025) ===
RSL began the 2021 season with no defined ownership, with MLS controlling the process of sale to new ownership. Despite a relatively strong start to the season, Juarez unexpectedly left as head coach on August 27 to become an assistant coach with Seattle Sounders FC, leaving his own assistant Pablo Mastroeni to see out the season as interim. Under Mastroeni, the team made a late-season push to the playoffs, qualifying on the final day of the season through a stoppage-time goal by Kreilach to give RSL a win over Sporting Kansas City. Despite barely qualifying, the team progressed to the conference finals for the first time since 2013 before being defeated by the Portland Timbers. This success led to Mastroeni being named permanent head coach following the season.

Prior to the 2022 season, the franchise was acquired by sports team investors Ryan Smith and David Blitzer.

=== Miller ownership (2025–present) ===
On April 18, 2025, Miller Sports + Entertainment, led by former Utah Jazz owner Gail Miller, acquired a controlling interest in the franchise for $600 million, with Blitzer remaining as a minority owner.

== Colors and badge ==
The team's colors are claret red, cobalt blue, and real gold.

=== Uniform evolution ===
Home, away, and third uniforms.

- Home

2005	2006–07	2008–09	2010–11	2012–13	2014–15
2016–17	2018–19	2020–21	2022–23	2024–25

- Away

2005	2006–07	2008–09	2010–11	2012–14	2015–16
2017–18	2019–20	2021–22	2023–24	2025–26

- Third/special

2008	2010–11	2018

== Stadium ==
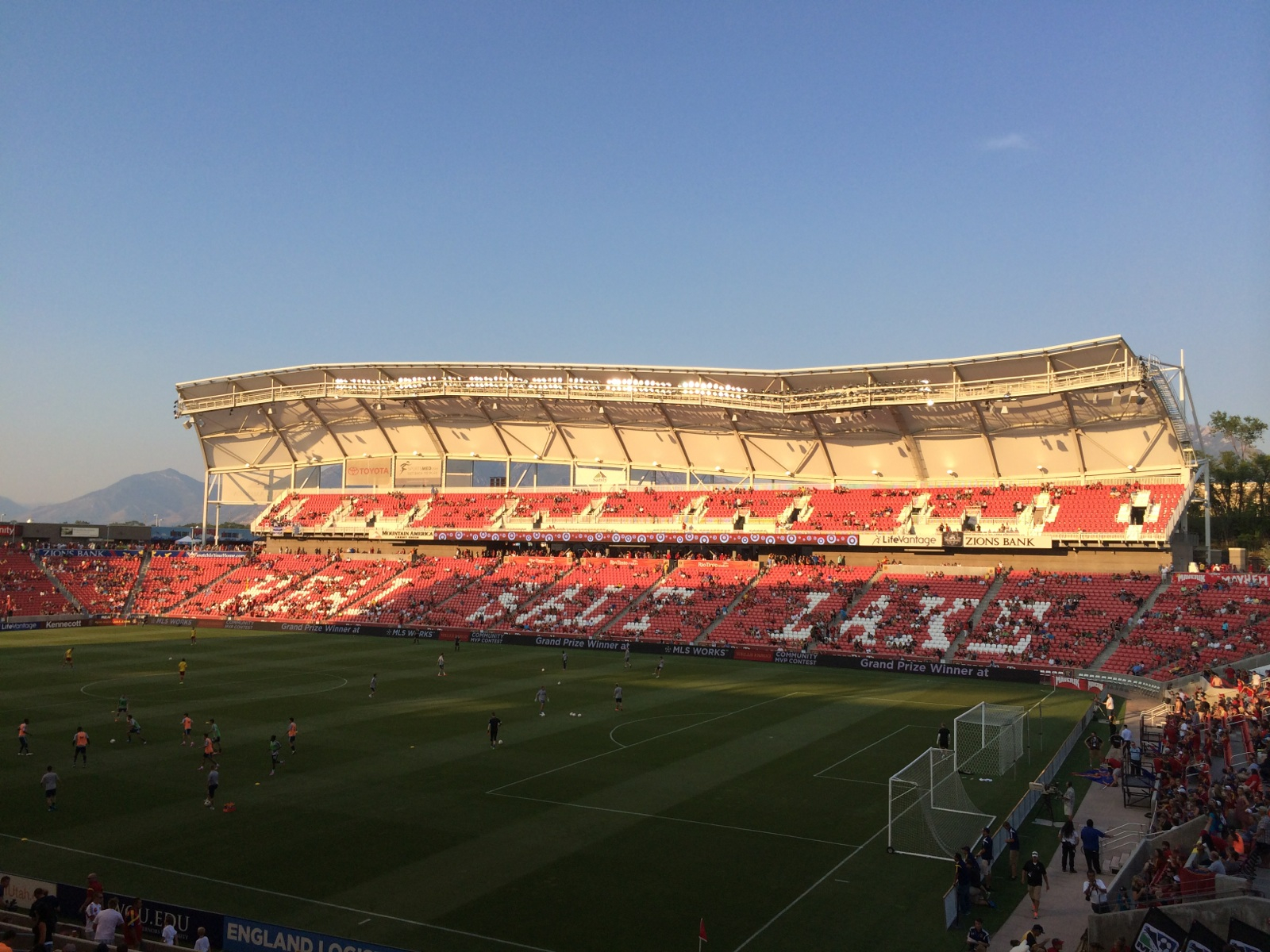
America First Field has been RSL's home stadium since 2008.

Name	Location	Years in use	Capacity
Rice-Eccles Stadium	Salt Lake City, Utah	2005–2008	45,071
America First Field	Sandy, Utah	2008–present	20,213

After months of discussions an agreement was put in place and Real Salt Lake announced that they would move forward with the construction of Real Salt Lake Stadium. The Debt Review Committee of Salt Lake County, however, voted against the stadium. In response, Real Salt Lake's owner announced the team would be sold and likely move out of the Salt Lake area after the 2007 season. However, a new stadium proposal was passed by the State Senate. The Utah House approved House bill 1SHB38, approving $35 million towards the development of Real Salt Lake's new home. The governor signed the bill.

The $110 million stadium was built in Sandy, a suburb of Salt Lake City. The stadium was named after its sponsor, Rio Tinto Group. The stadium opened on October 9, 2008. In September 2022, Rio Tinto Stadium was renamed America First Field, with RSL and America First Credit Union announcing a naming rights deal.

== Club culture ==
=== Rivalries ===
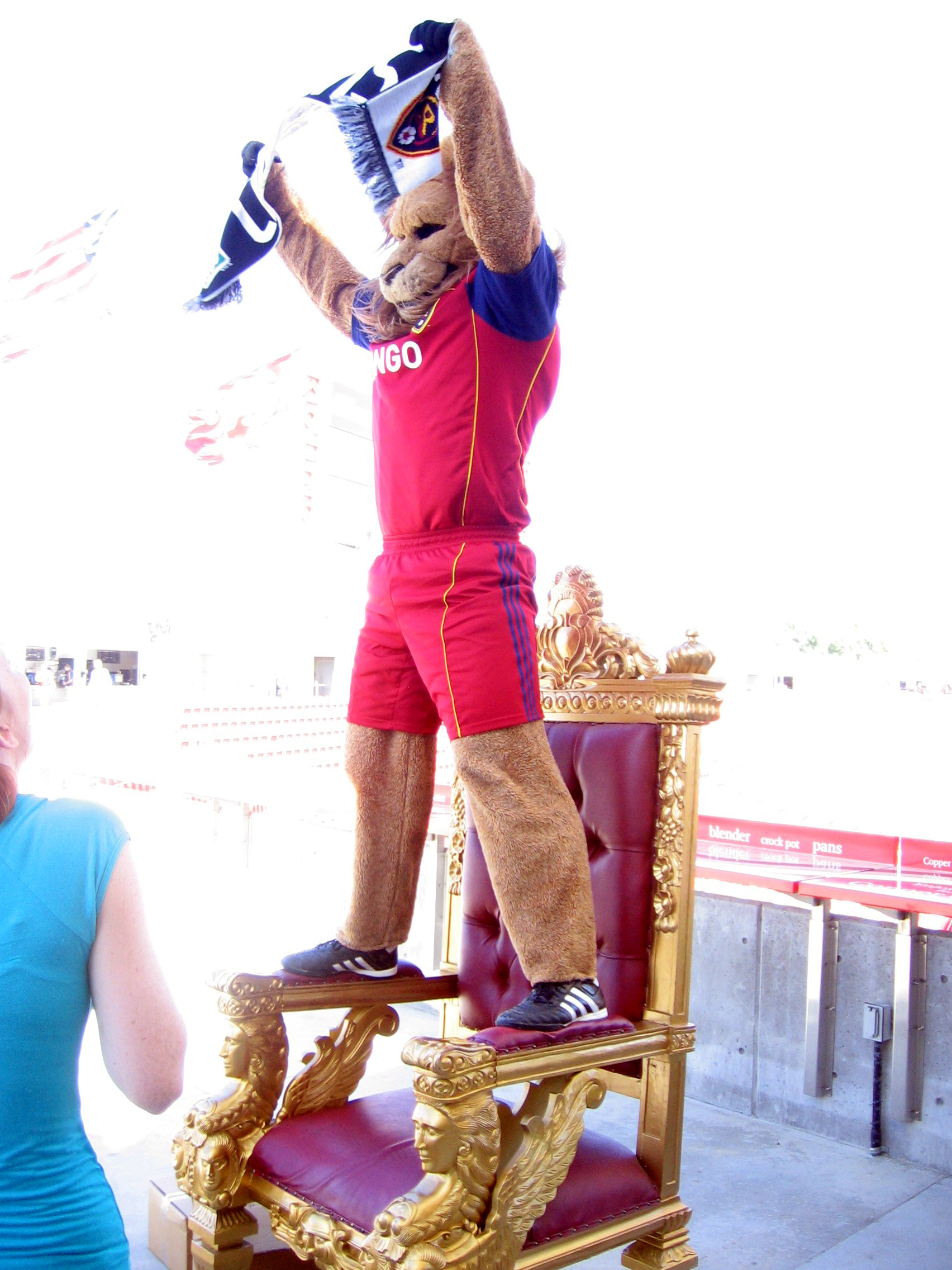
Leo the Lion at a "Meet the Players" event, August 2010

The main rival of Real Salt Lake is considered to be the Colorado Rapids, with the two competing for the annual Rocky Mountain Cup. The two clubs are the closest to each other geographically, and began the rivalry upon RSL's entrance into Major League Soccer in the 2005 season. As of the 2026 season, RSL holds the edge in the cup, winning 14 times to Colorado's 7.

Although no annual trophy is involved, the club also maintains a fierce rivalry with Sporting Kansas City. Initially born out of a preseason brawl in 2011, the rivalry escalated following the 2013 MLS Cup, in which RSL was defeated by Kansas City in penalties. Both teams have regularly competed in the Western Conference.

Fans of the club also maintain smaller-scale rivalries with the LA Galaxy, Los Angeles FC, and Seattle Sounders FC.

=== Supporters groups ===
Real Salt Lake has seven officially recognized supporters groups—Salt City United, Rogue Cavaliers Brigade, Section 26, Riot Brigade, La Barra Real, Section 11 ("The Swarm"), and Los Caballeros Reales—which as of 2019 all exist under a larger unified umbrella group known as The Riot.

Leo the Lion is the official mascot of Real Salt Lake.

=== Club anthem ===
In 2011, Branden Steineckert, drummer of punk band Rancid and a supporter of Real Salt Lake, composed the song "Believe" in honor of the club. Initially posted on YouTube, the song has since been adopted as the team's official anthem, being sung at the beginning of every home game, at the end of every home game if the result is a win, as well as after all goals scored by RSL.

== Revenue and profitability ==
As Real Salt Lake is a small-market team, one of the team's biggest challenges is bringing in enough revenue to remain competitive. Opening Rio Tinto Stadium in October 2008 provided a significant revenue boost to the team. Real Salt Lake went from 4,000 season-ticket holders before October 2008, to 8,750 in 2012, 10,000 in 2013, and 15,000+ in 2016.

=== Sponsorship ===
Period	Kit manufacturer	Shirt sponsor
2005–2008	Adidas	—
2009–2012	Adidas	Xango
2012–2013	Adidas	Xango (home) LifeVantage (away)
2014–2023	Adidas	LifeVantage
2024–present	Adidas	Intermountain Health

RSL has a long-term sponsorship deal with Intermountain Health. It previously had sponsorship deals with LifeVantage and Xango. Additional sponsors include JetBlue Airways, Maverik, Inc., Ford, WCF Insurance, and Zions Bank. Their corporate sponsors are America First Credit Union, Adidas, Atlas Disposal, City Creek Center, Coca-Cola, Collins Roofing Inc., Continental Tires, England Logistics, Utah Governor's Office of Economic Development, Great Clips, Key Bank, Les Olson Company, MarketStar, Michelob ULTRA, Pikus Concrete, Planet Fitness, Presidio, RealMedia, Sew Sweet, Sherwin-Williams, Siegfried and Jensen, Summit Technology, Toro, Toyota, Utah Children's Dental Network, Utah: Life Elevated, WGU, YESCO, and Zagg brands.

== Broadcasting ==
Sinclair Broadcast Group held television rights to Real Salt Lake games that were not aired by Major League Soccer's national television partners. The telecasts (which, until its discontinuation, were originally presented by Sinclair's American Sports Network) featured pre- and post-game coverage. Sinclair's Utah station KMYU served as the team's flagship station, and telecasts were syndicated to other Sinclair-owned stations in the region, and non-Sinclair stations in Albuquerque, Phoenix and Tucson. In 2018, the team extended its television deal with Sinclair, and announced a streaming partnership with KSL-TV, under which it offered in-market streaming of RSL's regional broadcasts, as well as their former sister club Utah Royals (NWSL) and reserve club Real Monarchs (then in the USL), on digital platforms. In 2020, the team extended its television deal with Sinclair until 2022.

== Players and staff ==
For details on former players, see All-time Real Salt Lake roster.

=== Roster ===
As of September 26, 2026

Note: Flags indicate national team as defined under FIFA eligibility rules; some limited exceptions apply. Players may hold more than one non-FIFA nationality.

No.	Pos.	Nation	Player
1	GK	BRA	Rafael Cabral
2	DF	USA	DeAndre Yedlin
3	DF	TTO	Kobi Henry
4	DF	DEN	Lukas Engel
6	MF	NED	Stijn Spierings
8	MF	URU	Juan Manuel Sanabria
9	FW	GUI	Morgan Guilavogui
10	MF	USA	Diego Luna
11	MF	POL	Dominik Marczuk
12	FW	GEO	Saba Lobjanidze
13	FW	USA	Jason Shokalook
14	DF	USA	Emeka Eneli
15	DF	USA	Justen Glad
18	MF	USA	Taylor Booth (on loan from Twente)
19	FW	AUS	Ariath Piol
21	DF	COL	Juan José Arias
22	FW	ESP	Sergi Solans
23	MF	USA	Zach Booth (on loan from Excelsior)
24	GK	USA	Max Kerkvliet

No.	Pos.	Nation	Player
25	MF	USA	Colin Guske (on loan from Orlando City)
26	DF	USA	Philip Quinton
27	MF	USA	Griffin Dillon
28	FW	SRB	Dušan Žagar
29	DF	USA	Sam Junqua
30	MF	USA	Owen Anderson
31	GK	USA	Mason Stajduhar
32	FW	USA	Chance Cowell
33	FW	CAN	Van Parker
34	MF	USA	Luca Moisa
37	DF	USA	Luis Rivera
38	MF	CHI	Antonio Riquelme
39	MF	USA	Aiden Hezarkhani
40	MF	USA	Omar Marquez
41	DF	USA	Juan Gio Villa
44	DF	CAN	Luc de Fougerolles (on loan from Fulham)
70	FW	BRA	Lineker Rodrigues
92	MF	GER	Noel Caliskan
98	DF	GRE	Alexandros Katranis

=== Out on loan ===
Note: Flags indicate national team as defined under FIFA eligibility rules; some limited exceptions apply. Players may hold more than one non-FIFA nationality.

No.	Pos.	Nation	Player
16	FW	USA	Tyler Wolff (on loan to Sacramento Republic)
17	FW	NGR	Victor Olatunji (on loan to Beveren)

No.	Pos.	Nation	Player
36	FW	ESP	Jesús Barea (on loan to AC Boise)
66	FW	MEX	Diego Rocío (on loan to Club América)

=== Technical and coaching staff ===
Title	Name
President	John Kimball
Sporting Director/CSO	Kurt Schmid
General manager	Vacant
Assistant general manager	Tony Beltran
Club Operations	Jason Kreis
Head coach	Pablo Mastroeni
Assistant coach	Jámison Olave
Assistant coach	Anthony Pulis
Assistant coach	Nate Miller
Goalkeeping coach	Mirza Harambašić
Performance Coach	Sean Buckley
Director of video analysis	Rob Rogers
Director of athletic performance	Theron Enns
Director of team administration	Chase Rusden
Team administrator	Rory James
Player care manager	Christian Peters
Head athletic trainer	Jacob Joachim
Assistant athletic trainer	Luke Cantin
Equipment manager	Benjamin Chavez

Last updated: January 6, 2024
Source: Real Salt Lake

=== Ring of Honor ===
No.	Player	Position	Nation	Tenure	Ref.
9	Jason Kreis	Forward	United States	2005–2007	
11	Javier Morales	Midfielder	Argentina	2007–2016	
18	Nick Rimando	Goalkeeper	United States	2007–2019	

=== Team captains ===
Nationality	Name	Tenure
United States	Jason Kreis	2005–2007
United States	Eddie Pope	2007
United States	Kyle Beckerman	2008–2020
Slovakia	Albert Rusnák	2021
Croatia	Damir Kreilach	2022–2023
Colombia	Chicho Arango	2024
United States	Emeka Eneli	2025
Brazil	Rafael Cabral	2025–present

=== General managers ===
Name	Tenure
Steve Pastorino	2004–2007
Garth Lagerwey	2007–2014
Craig Waibel	2015–2019
Elliot Fall	2019–2023
Pablo Mastroeni	2019- Present

=== Ownership history ===
- Dave Checketts (2005–2013)
- Del Loy Hansen (2009–2020)
- MLS (2021)
- Ryan Smith (2022–2025)
- David Blitzer (2022–present)
- Gail Miller (Miller Sports + Entertainment) (2025–present)

=== Head coaches ===
- Includes MLS regular Season, MLS Playoffs, CONCACAF Champions League, Lamar Hunt U.S. Open Cup, and Leagues Cup.

As of April 25, 2025

All-time coaching stats
Head coach	Tenure	Games	Win	Loss	Draw	Win %	PPG	Playoffs	Notes
(United States) John Ellinger	January 2005 – May 3, 2007	71	16	39	16	33.8%	0.90	0/2	Inaugural head coach
(United States) Jason Kreis	May 3, 2007 – December 10, 2013	261	112	85	64	55.2%	1.52	6/7	First championship
(United States) Jeff Cassar	December 18, 2013 – March 20, 2017	121	45	43	33	50.8%	1.39	2/3	
(United States) Daryl Shore	March 20, 2017 – April 3, 2017	2	0	1	1	25.0%	0.5	0/0	interim
(United States) Mike Petke	April 3, 2017 – August 11, 2019	91	37	39	15	48.9%	1.38	1/2	
(United States) Freddy Juarez	August 11, 2019 – August 27, 2021	55	18	14	23	53.6%	0.8	1/2	interim until December 3, 2019
(United States) Pablo Mastroeni	August 27, 2021 – present	149	61	57	31	51.3%	1.43	4/4	interim until December 13, 2021

== Honors ==
Domestic
Competitions	Titles	Seasons
MLS Cup	1	2009
Western Conference (Playoff)	1	2013
Eastern Conference (Playoff)	1	2009

== Team results ==
=== Year-by-year ===
This is a partial list of the last five seasons completed by RSL. For the full season-by-season history, see List of Real Salt Lake seasons.

Season	League											Position		Playoffs	USOC	Continental / Other		Average attendance	Top goalscorer(s)	
Season	Div	League	Pld	W	L	D	GF	GA	GD	Pts	PPG	Conf.	Overall	Playoffs	USOC	Continental / Other		Average attendance	Name(s)	Goals
2021	1	MLS	34	14	14	6	55	54	+1	48	1.41	7th	13th	SF	NH			15,283	(Croatia) Damir Kreilach	16
2022	1	MLS	34	12	11	11	43	45	−2	47	1.38	7th	14th	R1	R3			20,470	(Venezuela) Sergio Córdova	11
2023	1	MLS	34	14	12	8	48	50	−2	50	1.41	5th	11th	R1	SF	Leagues Cup	R16	19,429	(Venezuela) Jefferson Savarino	7
2024	1	MLS	34	16	7	11	65	48	+17	59	1.74	3rd	6th	R1	Ro32	Leagues Cup	GS	20,295	(Colombia) Cristian Arango	17
2025	1	MLS	34	12	17	5	38	49	-11	41	1.21	9th	19th	WC	DNP	CONCACAF Champions Cup Leagues Cup	R1 LS	19,772	(United States) Diego Luna	10

1. Avg. attendance include statistics from league matches only.
2. Top goalscorer(s) includes all goals scored in League, MLS Cup Playoffs, U.S. Open Cup, MLS is Back Tournament, CONCACAF Champions League, FIFA Club World Cup, and other competitive continental matches.

=== CONCACAF Champions Cup ===
- Did not qualify for Champions League tournament in years not listed

As of April 25, 2025

Real Salt Lake in CONCACAF competition
Season	Qualification method	Round	Opposition	Home	Away
2010–11	2009 MLS Cup champion	Group stage	(Panama) Árabe Unido	2–1	3–2
2010–11	2009 MLS Cup champion	Group stage	(Mexico) Cruz Azul	3–1	4–5
2010–11	2009 MLS Cup champion	Group stage	(Canada) Toronto FC	4–1	1–1
2010–11	2009 MLS Cup champion	Quarter-finals	(United States) Columbus Crew	4–1	0–0
2010–11	2009 MLS Cup champion	Semi-finals	(Costa Rica) Saprissa	2–0	1–2
2010–11	2009 MLS Cup champion	Finals	(Mexico) Monterrey	0–1	2–2
2012–13	2011 MLS Supporters' Shield third place	Group stage	(Costa Rica) Herediano	0–0	0–1
2012–13	2011 MLS Supporters' Shield third place	Group stage	(Panama) Tauro F.C.	2–0	1–0
2015–16	2014 MLS Supporters' Shield fourth place	Group stage	(Guatemala) Municipal	1–0	1–0
2015–16	2014 MLS Supporters' Shield fourth place	Group stage	(El Salvador) Santa Tecla	2–1	0–0
2015–16	2014 MLS Supporters' Shield fourth place	Quarter-finals	(Mexico) UANL	1–1	0–2
2025	2024 MLS Supporters' Shield sixth place	Round One	(Costa Rica) Herediano	0–0	1–2

- Win %- Number of wins divided by number of games played (ties count as half a win)
- Games decided by a PK Shoot out counted as win or loss not Draw.

As of April 25, 2025

CONCACAF Champions League Team, by Team records:
Team	Country	Home								Away								Total							
		GP	W	L	D	F	A	GD	Win %	GP	W	L	D	F	A	GD	Win %	GP	W	L	D	F	A	GD	Win %
Árabe Unido	PAN	1	1	0	0	2	1	+1	100%	1	1	0	0	3	2	+1	100%	2	2	0	0	5	3	+2	100%
Columbus Crew	USA	1	1	0	0	4	1	+3	100%	1	0	0	1	0	0	0	50.0%	2	1	0	1	4	1	+3	75.0%
Cruz Azul	MEX	1	1	0	0	3	1	+2	100%	1	0	1	0	4	5	−1	0.0%	2	1	1	0	7	6	+1	50.0%
Herediano	CRC	2	0	1	1	1	2	-1	25.0%	2	0	1	1	0	1	−1	25.0%	4	0	2	2	1	3	−2	25.0%
Monterrey	MEX	1	0	1	0	0	1	−1	0.0%	1	0	0	1	2	2	0	50.0%	2	0	1	1	2	3	−1	25.0%
Municipal	GUA	1	1	0	0	1	0	+1	100%	1	1	0	0	1	0	+1	100%	2	2	0	0	2	0	+2	100%
Santa Tecla	SLV	1	1	0	0	2	1	+1	100%	1	0	0	1	0	0	0	50.0%	2	1	0	1	2	1	+1	75.0%
Saprissa	CRC	1	1	0	0	2	0	+2	100%	1	0	1	0	1	2	−1	0.0%	2	1	1	0	3	2	+1	50.0%
Tauro F.C.	PAN	1	1	0	0	2	0	+2	100%	1	1	0	0	1	0	+1	100%	2	2	0	0	3	0	+3	100%
Toronto FC	CAN	1	1	0	0	4	1	+3	100%	1	0	0	1	1	1	0	50.0%	2	1	0	1	5	2	+3	75.0%
UANL	MEX	1	0	0	1	1	1	0	50.0%	1	0	1	0	0	2	−2	0.0%	2	0	1	1	1	3	−2	25.0%
Total		11	8	1	2	21	7	+14	81.8%	11	3	4	4	13	15	-2	45.5%	22	11	5	6	34	22	+12	63.6%

=== Leagues Cup ===
Season	Round	Opponent	Result
2019	Quarter-finals	(Mexico) Tigres UANL	0–1
2023	Group stage	(United States) Seattle Sounders FC	3–0
2023	Group stage	(Mexico) Monterrey	0–3
2023	Round of 32	(Mexico) Club León	3–1
2023	Round of 16	(United States) Los Angeles FC	0–4
2024	Group stage	(Mexico) Atlas	3–1
2024	Group stage	(United States) Houston Dynamo FC	0–3
2025	League stage	(Mexico) América	2-2 (3-1 pk)
2025	League stage	(Mexico) Atlético San Luis	2-2 (1-4 pk)
2025	League stage	(Mexico) Querétaro	1–0

=== MLS records ===
- Fewest goals allowed: 20 (previous record 23, Houston 2007)
- Overall goal difference: +25 (previous record +22, San Jose 2005 and D.C. United 2007)
- Home goal difference: +24 (previous record +23, Real Salt Lake 2009)
- Total home points (30-game season): 37 (previous record 35, Columbus 2009)
- Fewest home losses: 0 (equals previous record set by San Jose in 2005)
- Fewest home goals allowed: 7 (previous record 8, Colorado 2004)

== Associated teams ==
The reserve team of Real Salt Lake, named Real Monarchs SLC, was created on September 10, 2014, as a bridge between the club's academy program and the first level team. The team began play in the Western Conference of the United Soccer League during the 2015 season, playing their home games at Rio Tinto Stadium along with their parent team. Starting in 2018, the Monarchs will move to Zions Bank Stadium, a 5,000-seat facility located at RSL's new training center in Herriman.

A women's soccer team, called Real Salt Lake Women, was founded in 2008. The team is currently a member of the Western Division of United Women's Soccer, the second tier of women's soccer in the United States and Canada, and plays its home games at Ute Field, on the campus of the University of Utah in Salt Lake City.

Real Salt Lake added a second women's team, this one in the top-level National Women's Soccer League, in November 2017. This team effectively replaced FC Kansas City in the NWSL, as FC Kansas City soon folded and all of its player contracts were assigned to the new RSL franchise. Shortly thereafter, the new team, which will share Rio Tinto Stadium, was unveiled as Utah Royals FC.

== Player records ==
=== Career ===
- Players in **Bold** are still active
- Only regular season matches played with Real Salt Lake counted towards all-time records. Stats from MLS play-offs, U.S. Open Cup, Super Liga and CONCACAF Champions league are not included.

As of October 19, 2025

Goals
Rank	Player	Goals	Apps	Years
1	(Costa Rica) Álvaro Saborío	63	127	2010–2015
2	(Argentina) Javier Morales	49	240	2007–2016
3	(Croatia) Damir Kreilach	47	151	2018–2023
4	(Ecuador) Joao Plata	46	175	2013–2019
5	(Slovakia) Albert Rusnák	41	140	2017–2021
6	(United States) Robbie Findley	36	137	2007–2010, 2013–2014
7	(Argentina) Fabián Espíndola	35	125	2007–2012
7	(Venezuela) Jefferson Savarino	35	125	2017–2019, 2022–2024
9	(Armenia) Yura Movsisyan	31	110	2007–2009, 2016–2017
10	(United States) Kyle Beckerman	30	350	2007–2020

Assists
Rank	Player	Assists	Apps	Years
1	(Argentina) Javier Morales	81	240	2007–2016
2	(Ecuador) Joao Plata	43	175	2013–2019
3	(Slovakia) Albert Rusnák	39	140	2017–2021
3	(United States) Kyle Beckerman	39	350	2007–2020
5	(Venezuela) Jefferson Savarino	33	125	2017–2019, 2022–2024
6	(Jamaica) Andy Williams	29	189	2005–2011
7	(Croatia) Damir Kreilach	24	151	2018–2023
8	(Cuba) Maikel Chang	20	124	2020–2024
9	**(United States) Diego Luna**	19	94	2022–present
9	(Guatemala) Aaron Herrera	19	124	2018–2022

Appearances
Rank	Player	Apps	Goals	Years
1	(United States) Nick Rimando	369	0	2007–2019
2	(United States) Kyle Beckerman	350	30	2007–2020
3	(United States) **Justen Glad**	272	13	2013–present
4	(United States) Chris Wingert	247	2	2007–2014, 2016–2017
5	(United States) Tony Beltran	245	1	2008–2019
6	(Argentina) Javier Morales	240	49	2007–2016
7	(United States) Nat Borchers	205	10	2008–2014
8	(Jamaica) Andy Williams	189	14	2005–2011
9	(Ecuador) Joao Plata	175	46	2013–2019
10	(Colombia) Jámison Olave	159	13	2008–2012, 2015–2016

Shutouts
Rank	Player	Shutouts	Apps	Years
1	(United States) Nick Rimando	118	369	2007–2019
2	(United States) Zac MacMath	30	98	2020–2025
3	(Brazil) **Rafael Cabral**	7	34	2025–present
4	(United States) Andrew Putna	6	22	2018–2021
5	(Mexico) David Ochoa	5	26	2019–2022
5	(United States) Jeff Attinella	5	29	2013–2016
7	(United States) Kyle Reynish	4	8	2007–2012
7	(United States) D.J. Countess	4	27	2005
7	(United States) Scott Garlick	4	31	2006–2007
10	(United States) Gavin Beavers	3	18	2022–2024

=== Single season ===
- Only regular season matches played with Real Salt Lake counted towards records.
- Players in **bold** currently play for Real Salt Lake.

Legend
Indicates current season

As of October 19, 2025

Goals
Rank	Player	Nation	Season	Goals	Assists
1	Chicho Arango	(Colombia)	2024	17	11
1	Álvaro Saborío	(Costa Rica)	2012	17	3
3	Jeff Cunningham	(United States)	2006	16	11
3	Damir Kreilach	(Croatia)	2021	16	9
5	Andrés Gómez	(Colombia)	2024	13	9
5	Joao Plata	(Ecuador)	2014	13	6
7	Damir Kreilach	(Croatia)	2018	12	8
7	Álvaro Saborío	(Costa Rica)	2010	12	4
7	Robbie Findley	(United States)	2009	12	4
7	Álvaro Saborío	(Costa Rica)	2013	12	2

Assists
Rank	Player	Nation	Season	Assists	Minutes
1	Javier Morales	(Argentina)	2008	15	2511
2	Albert Rusnák	(Slovakia)	2017	14	2579
3	**Diego Luna**	(United States)	2024	12	2014
3	Chicho Arango	(Colombia)	2024	12	2079
3	Javier Morales	(Argentina)	2015	12	2124
3	Javier Morales	(Argentina)	2014	12	2645
7	Jeff Cunningham	(United States)	2006	11	2404
7	Joao Plata	(Ecuador)	2016	11	2478
7	Aaron Herrera	(Guatemala)	2021	11	2514
7	Jefferson Savarino	(Venezuela)	2018	11	2853
7	Albert Rusnák	(Slovakia)	2021	11	3045

Shutouts
Rank	Player	Nation	Season	Shutouts
1	Nick Rimando	(United States)	2010	14
2	Nick Rimando	(United States)	2011	13
3	Nick Rimando	(United States)	2012	12
4	Nick Rimando	(United States)	2019	10
4	Zac MacMath	(United States)	2022	10
6	Nick Rimando	(United States)	2009	9
6	Nick Rimando	(United States)	2013	9
6	Zac MacMath	(United States)	2023	9
9	Nick Rimando	(United States)	2015	8
9	Nick Rimando	(United States)	2017	8
9	Nick Rimando	(United States)	2008	8

=== Hat tricks ===
Player	Date	Opponent	Result	Competition
(United States) Jason Kreis	July 13, 2005	Minnesota Thunder	L 4–6	Open Cup
(United States) Robbie Findley	April 2, 2009	Columbus Crew	W 4–1	MLS
(Costa Rica) Álvaro Saborío	July 7, 2012	Portland Timbers	W 3–0	MLS
(Costa Rica) Álvaro Saborío	September 29, 2012	Chivas USA	W 4–0	MLS
(Costa Rica) Álvaro Saborío	July 27, 2013	New York Red Bulls	L 3–4	MLS
(Argentina) Javier Morales	May 11, 2014	Houston Dynamo	W 5–2	MLS
(Croatia) Damir Kreilach	September 1, 2018	LA Galaxy	W 6–2	MLS
(Colombia) Chicho Arango	March 30, 2024	St. Louis City SC	W 3–1	MLS
(Colombia) Chicho Arango	June 1, 2024	Austin FC	W 5–1	MLS

== Player honors ==
=== League honors ===
==== MLS All-Star appearances ====
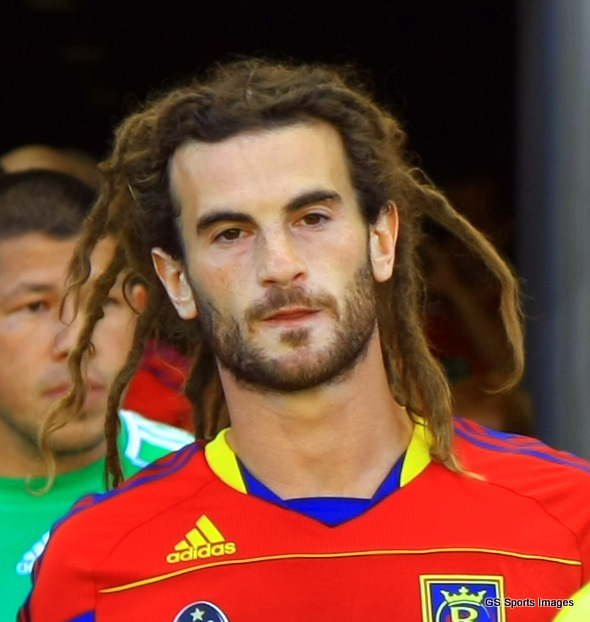
Kyle Beckerman

Players in bold currently play for Real Salt Lake.

Appearances	Player	Nation	Years
8	Kyle Beckerman	(United States)	2007, 2009, 2010, 2011, 2012, 2013, 2014, 2016
7	Nick Rimando	(United States)	2010, 2011, 2012, 2013, 2014, 2015, 2019
3	Jamison Olave	(Colombia)	2010, 2011, 2012
2	Tony Beltran	(United States)	2013, 2015
2	**Diego Luna**	(United States)	2024, 2025
2	Javier Morales	(Argentina)	2009, 2010
2	Eddie Pope	(United States)	2005, 2007
1	Chicho Arango	(Colombia)	2024
1	Fabián Espíndola	(Argentina)	2012
1	**Justen Glad**	(United States)	2024
1	Will Johnson	(Canada)	2009
1	Damir Kreilach	(Croatia)	2021
1	Zavier Gozo	(United States)	2026

==== Player awards ====
The following awards were given to Real Salt Lake players by Major League Soccer in the season indicated:

Season	Award	Player(s)
2006	MLS Best XI	(United States) Jeff Cunningham
2006	MLS Golden Boot	(United States) Jeff Cunningham
2009	MLS Cup Most Valuable Player	(United States) Nick Rimando
2010	MLS Best XI	(United States) Nat Borchers, (Colombia) Jámison Olave, (Argentina) Javier Morales
2010	MLS Defender of the Year	(Colombia) Jámison Olave
2010	MLS Newcomer of the Year	(Costa Rica) Álvaro Saborío
2011	MLS Best XI	(Colombia) Jámison Olave
2018	MLS Rookie of the Year	(United States) Corey Baird
2024	MLS Young Player of the Year	(United States) Diego Luna

=== Team honors ===
- The annual season-ending award winners are decided based on voting by RSL players.

==== Team MVP ====
Season	Player
2005	(Jamaica) Andy Williams
2006	(United States) Jeff Cunningham
2007	(United States) Nick Rimando
2008	(Argentina) Javier Morales
2009	(United States) Nat Borchers
2010	(Argentina) Javier Morales (2)
2011	(United States) Kyle Beckerman
2012	(United States) Kyle Beckerman (2)
2013	(United States) Kyle Beckerman (3)
2014	(Ecuador) Joao Plata
2015	(Argentina) Javier Morales (3)
2016	(United States) Kyle Beckerman (4)
2017	(Slovakia) Albert Rusnák
2018	(Croatia) Damir Kreilach
2019	(Brazil) Everton Luiz
2020	(Croatia) Damir Kreilach (2)
2021	(Croatia) Damir Kreilach (3)
2022	(United States) Justen Glad
2023	(Argentina) Pablo Ruiz
2024	(United States) Emeka Eneli
2025	(Brazil) Rafael Cabral

==== Golden boot ====
Season	Player	Goals
2005	(United States) Jason Kreis	9
2006	(United States) Jeff Cunningham	16
2007	(United States) Robbie Findley	6
2008	(Armenia) Yura Movsisyan	8
2009	(United States) Robbie Findley (2)	12
2010	(Costa Rica) Álvaro Saborío	12
2011	(Costa Rica) Álvaro Saborío (2)	11
2012	(Costa Rica) Álvaro Saborío (3)	17
2013	(Costa Rica) Álvaro Saborío (4)	12
2014	(Ecuador) Joao Plata	13
2015	(Argentina) Javier Morales	8
2016	(Ecuador) Joao Plata (2)	9
2017	(Slovakia) Albert Rusnák	7
2018	(Croatia) Damir Kreilach	12
2019	(Slovakia) Albert Rusnák (2)	7
2020	(Croatia) Damir Kreilach (2)	8
2021	(Croatia) Damir Kreilach (3)	16
2022	(Venezuela) Sergio Córdova	9
2023	(Venezuela) Jefferson Savarino	7
2024	(Colombia) Chicho Arango	17
2025	(United States) Diego Luna	9

==== Defensive Player of the Year ====
Season	Player
2005	(United States) Eddie Pope
2006	(United States) Carey Talley
2007	(United States) Eddie Pope (2)
2008	(United States) Nat Borchers
2009	(Colombia) Jámison Olave
2010	(United States) Nat Borchers (2)
2011	(United States) Nat Borchers (3)
2012	(United States) Nick Rimando
2013	(United States) Nick Rimando (2)
2014	(United States) Chris Schuler
2015	(United States) Aaron Maund
2016	(United States) Justen Glad
2017	(United States) Justen Glad (2)
2018	(United States) Brooks Lennon
2019	(Guatemala) Aaron Herrera
2020	(Guatemala) Aaron Herrera (2)
2021	(Guatemala) Aaron Herrera (3)
2022	(United States) Andrew Brody
2023	(Colombia) Brayan Vera
2024	(United States) Justen Glad (3)
2025	(Brazil) Rafael Cabral
