= All-time Real Salt Lake roster =

Real Salt Lake is an American soccer club founded in 2005, currently playing in the Western Conference of Major League Soccer. It currently plays its home games at America First Field in Sandy, Utah, a suburb of Salt Lake City. Since founding, the club won MLS Cup 2009, and finished as runner-up for the 2010 MLS Supporters Shield, the 2010-11 CONCACAF Champions League, the 2013 Lamar Hunt U.S. Open Cup, and MLS Cup 2013.

As of the end of the 2025 Major League Soccer season, a total of 227 players have played in at least one league match for Real Salt Lake. American goalkeeper Nick Rimando holds the club record for both shutouts and total regular season appearances, with 118 shutouts and 369 appearances, respectively. The club's all-time top scorer is Costa Rican international Álvaro Saborío, with 63 goals in 127 regular season appearances with the club. The club record for assists is held by Argentine Javier Morales, with 95 assists in 281 regular season appearances.

== Players ==
=== Outfield Players ===
These players have appeared in at least one match for Real Salt Lake.

Competitive matches only. Players in bold are currently on the team roster.

As of the end of the 2025 Major League Soccer season.

Player				Total						
Name	Position	Country	Years	Caps	Goals	Assists	Cautions	Ejections	Int'l Caps	Int'l Goals
Danilo Acosta	FW	Honduras	2016-19	29	0	4	2	1	2	0
Freddy Adu	FW	United States	2007	13	1	2	1	0	17	2
William Agada	FW	Nigeria	2025	22	2	2	5	1	0	0
Artur Aghasyan	FW	Armenia	2011	4	0	0	0	0	0	0
Chris Agorsor	FW	United States	2011	1	0	0	0	0	0	0
Forster Ajago	FW	Ghana	2025	6	1	0	2	0	0	0
Nelson Akwari	DF	United States	2005-06	42	0	0	7	0	0	0
Jean Alexandre	MF	Haiti	2009-11	49	2	3	7	0	39	2
Jordan Allen	MF	United States	2014-19	50	4	4	5	1	0	0
Arturo Alvarez	MF	El Salvador	2011	20	0	2	0	0	43	4
Yordany Alvarez	MF	Cuba	2011-13	46	1	0	11	2	8	3
Chicho Arango	FW	Colombia	2023-2024	41	23	14	9	0	2	0
Cody Arnoux	FW	United States	2011-12	3	0	0	0	0	0	0
Luis Arriaga	MF	United States	2019	2	0	0	0	0	0	
Pedro Báez	FW	Paraguay	2016	1	0	0	0	0	0	0
Corey Baird	FW	United States	2018-20	83	15	13	14	0	0	0
Rich Balchan	DF	United States	2013-14	4	0	0	0	0	0	0
Mehdi Ballouchy	MF	Morocco	2006-07	50	2	4	9	0	0	0
Fidel Barajas	FW	Mexico	2024	17	0	2	1	0	0	0
**Jesús Barea**	FW	Spain	2025-	11	0	0	0	0	0	0
Chad Barrett	FW	United States	2017	3	0	0	0	0	1	0
Shawn Barry	DF	Puerto Rico	2018	4	0	0	0	0	4	0
Kyle Beckerman	MF	United States	2007-20	377	30	39	93	6	58	1
Matt Behncke	DF	United States	2005	8	0	0	0	0	0	0
Matthew Bell	FW	Jamaica	2024-2025	1	0	0	0	0	0	0
Tony Beltran	DF	United States	2008-19	245	1	12	41	4	3	0
Nikolas Besagno	MF	United States	2007	11	0	0	2	0	0	0
Nick Besler	MF	United States	2017-22	89	2	3	13	0	0	0
Emiliano Bonfigli	FW	Argentina	2012	11	1	0	0	0	0	0
Nat Borchers	DF	United States	2008-14	247	12	5	20	5	3	0
Justin Braun	FW	United States	2012	2	0	0	0	0	0	0
Andrew Brody	DF	United States	2021-2025	124	2	16	6	0	0	0
Lachlan Brook	MF	Australia	2024-2025	12	0	0	2	0	0	0
Paul Broome	MF	United States	2005-06	11	0	0	4	0	0	0
Chris Brown	MF	United States	2005-07	65	7	2	0	0	0	0
**Javain Brown**	DF	Jamaica	2024-	9	0	0	2	0	17	0
Kyle Brown	FW	United States	2007	8	2	0	0	0	0	0
Gustavo Cabrera	DF	Guatemala	2005-06	4	0	1	2	0	100	2
Scott Caldwell	MF	United States	2022-2023	30	0	0	5	0	0	0
**Noel Caliskan**	MF	Germany	2024-	29	1	1	4	0	0	0
Pablo Campos	FW	Brazil	2009-10	29	2	4	3	0	0	0
Maikel Chang	MF	Cuba	2020-2024	124	5	20	9	0	0	0
Jordan Cila	FW	United States	2005	13	3	1	1	0	0	0
Matías Córdoba	MF	Argentina	2008	9	0	1	0	0	0	0
Sergio Córdova	FW	Venezuela	2022	33	9	2	2	0	15	0
Raphael Cox	MF	United States	2009	7	1	0	0	0	0	0
Matt Crooks	MF	England	2024	29	3	5	7	0	0	0
**Rwan Cruz**	FW	Brazil	2025-	10	0	1	4	0	0	0
Jeff Cunningham	FW	United States	2006-07	41	21	12	8	0	14	1
Kenny Cutler	MF	United States	2005-07	52	0	0	8	1	0	0
Toni Datković	DF	Croatia	2021	8	0	0	1	0	0	0
Kenny Deuchar	FW	Scotland	2008	30	3	2	4	0	0	0
Reagan Dunk	DF	United States	2017	3	0	0	0	0	0	0
Brian Dunseth	DF	United States	2005	25	2	0	3	1	0	0
Rachid El Khalifi	FW	Netherlands	2009	4	0	0	0	0	0	0
**Emeka Eneli**	MF	United States	2023-	82	1	4	14	0	2	0
Luis Miguel Escalada	FW	Argentina	2009	1	0	0	0	0	0	0
Alecko Eskandarian	FW	United States	2007	17	1	3	6	1	1	0
Fabián Espíndola	FW	Argentina	2007-12	155	38	17	31	4	0	0
Robbie Findley	FW	United States	2007-10; 2013-14	167	44	15	6	0	11	0
Tiger Fitzpatrick	MF	Trinidad and Tobago	2005	19	0	2	0	0	26	1
Willis Forko	DF	Liberia	2006-07	41	0	1	4	0	1	0
Chris Garcia	MF	United States	2020-22	3	0	0	0	0	0	0
Olmes García	FW	Colombia	2013-16	106	12	8	14	1	0	0
Luis Gil	MF	United States	2010-15	159	12	10	5	0	2	0
**Justen Glad**	DF	United States	2015-	272	13	3	53	3	0	0
Andrés Gómez	FW	Colombia	2023-2024	53	14	15	8	0	0	0
**Diogo Goncalves**	MF	Portugal	2024-	38	6	6	2	0	0	0
Nelson González	MF	Argentina	2009-11	24	3	3	3	0	0	0
**Zavier Gozo**	MF	United States	2023-	27	4	3	5	0	0	0
Ned Grabavoy	MF	United States	2009-14	196	11	17	18	1	0	0
Adolfo Gregorio	MF	United States	2005	6	0	0	0	0	0	0
Cole Grossman	MF	United States	2012-14	23	1	0	1	0	0	0
Atiba Harris	FW	Saint Kitts and Nevis	2006-07	45	4	2	14	1	59	14
Duke Hashimoto	FW	United States	2006-07	2	0	0	0	0	0	0
Adam Henley	DF	Wales	2018	5	0	0	1	0	2	0
**Kobi Henry**	DF	Trinidad and Tobago	2025-	3	0	0	0	0	3	1
Jose Hernandez	MF	Mexico	2017-18	7	1	0	0	0	0	0
Aaron Herrera	DF	United States	2018-22	124	1	19	27	2	1	0
Bode Hidalgo	MF	United States	2021-2025	72	1	2	8	0	0	0
Omar Holness	MF	Jamaica	2016-17	18	1	0	2	0	5	0
Erik Holt	DF	United States	2019-2024	42	1	1	6	0	0	0
David Horst	DF	United States	2008-10; 2017-18	20	0	1	4	0	0	0
Milan Iloski	FW	United States	2020-21	2	0	0	0	0		
Bertin Jacquesson	FW	France	2023-2024	10	0	1	0	0	0	0
Sebastian Jaime	FW	Argentina	2014-15	33	6	2	2	1	0	0
Christian Jimenez	MF	United States	2006-07	1	0	0	0	0	0	0
Ryan Johnson	FW	United States	2006	8	0	0	0	0	0	0
Sam Johnson	FW	Liberia	2019-20	34	10	0	1	0	0	0
Will Johnson	MF	Canada	2008-12	149	14	10	25	2	41	4
Ian Joy	DF	United States	2008-09	22	0	0	4	1	0	0
Anderson Julio	FW	Ecuador	2021-2025	111	25	6	6	0	0	0
**Sam Junqua**	DF	United States	2025-	32	1	1	0	0	0	0
Chris Kablan	DF	Switzerland	2022	2	0	0	0	0	0	0
Brian Kamler	MF	United States	2005	29	0	0	3	0	0	0
Johan Kappelhof	DF	Netherlands	2022	6	1	0	0	0	0	0
**Alexandros Katranis**	DF	Greece	2024-	58	4	10	18	0	0	0
Phanuel Kavita	DF	Rwanda	2015-16	4	0	0	1	0	0	0
Axel Kei	FW	Ivory Coast	2022-2025	1	0	0	0	0	0	0
Jean-Martial Kipré	MF	Ivory Coast	2007	20	0	0	4	1	0	0
Dustin Kirby	DF	United States	2007-08	4	0	0	0	0	0	0
Chris Klein	MF	United States	2006-07	46	9	9	1	0	22	5
Cameron Knowles	DF	New Zealand	2005-06	5	0	0	1	0	0	0
Richie Kotschau	DF	United States	2007	20	0	0	3	1	0	0
Dema Kovalenko	MF	Ukraine	2008	24	2	2	8	0	0	0
Luke Kreamalmeyer	MF	United States	2005	7	0	1	0	0	0	0
Damir Kreilach	MF	Croatia	2018-2023	138	45	24	26	1	0	0
Jason Kreis	FW	United States	2005-07	60	20	9	11	1	14	1
Kevon Lambert	MF	Jamaica	2023-2025	2	0	0	0	0	0	0
Chris Lancos	MF	United States	2007	16	0	1	4	0	0	0
Brooks Lennon	FW	United States	2017-19	86	3	10	12	0	1	0
Jasper Löffelsend	MF	Germany	2022-2024	51	2	7	9	0	0	0
Mike Lookingland	DF	United States	2017-	4	0	0	0	0	0	0
Ricky Lopez-Espin	FW	United States	2018	1	0	0	0	0	0	0
Everton Luiz	DF	Brazil	2019-22	78	0	3	19	0	0	0
**Diego Luna**	MF	United States	2022-	94	22	19	16	2	16	3
Abdoulie Mansally	DF	(The Gambia) Gambia	2012-15	57	1	3	10	2	15	0
Matias Mantilla	DF	Argentina	2007-08	19	1	1	6	0	0	0
**Dominik Marczuk**	MF	Poland	2024-	25	2	3	3	0	1	1
Douglas Martínez	FW	Honduras	2019-21	25	2	0	2	1	0	0
Juan Manuel Martínez	FW	Argentina	2015-16	32	9	3	3	0	4	1
Clint Mathis	MF	United States	2005; 2008-09	74	5	11	15	2	46	12
Aaron Maund	DF	United States	2013-17	64	2	1	1	1	0	0
Brandon McDonald	DF	United States	2013	3	0	0	0	0	0	0
Rauwshan McKenzie	DF	United States	2010-11	11	0	1	1	0	0	0
Jonathan Menéndez	FW	Argentina	2021-22	21	1	5	2	0	0	0
Justin Meram	FW	Iraq	2020-23	91	8	16	11	0	36	4
Benji Michel	FW	United States	2024	2	0	0	0	0	0	0
Javier Morales	MF	Argentina	2007-16	281	56	95	46	2	0	0
Ashtone Morgan	DF	Canada	2020-21	8	0	0	2	0	18	0
Yura Movsisyan	FW	Armenia	2007-09; 2016-17	110	31	6	11	1	38	14
Luke Mulholland	MF	England	2014-19	123	16	16	22	1	0	0
Danny Musovski	FW	United States	2022-2023	27	5	4	2	0	0	0
Kevin Novak	DF	United States	2005-06	31	1	0	3	0	0	0
Tino Nunez	FW	United States	2008-09	14	1	1	0	0	0	0
Leighton O'Brien	MF	United States	2005	6	0	0	1	0	0	0
**Braian Ojeda**	MF	Paraguay	2022-	99	4	11	17	1	11	0
Boyd Okwuonu	DF	United States	2015-16	7	0	0	0	0	0	0
**Victor Olatunji**	FW	Nigeria	2025-	8	4	1	1	0	0	
Jamison Olave	DF	Colombia	2008-12; 2015-16	183	15	4	41	9	0	0
Nedum Onuoha	DF	Nigeria	2018-20	44	1	1	2	0	0	0
Jaziel Orozco	DF	Mexico	2022-2024	4	0	0	0	0	0	0
Alfredo Ortuño	FW	Spain	2018	3	0	0	0	0	0	
Bryan Oviedo	DF	Costa Rica	2022-2024	46	0	8	5	0	81	2
**Nelson Palacio**	MF	Colombia	2023-	44	1	2	6	0	1	0
Lovel Palmer	DF	Jamaica	2013	21	0	1	5	1	30	0
Ilijah Paul	FW	United States	2023	4	0	0	0	0	0	
Paulo Jr.	FW	Brazil	2010-12	47	7	9	0	0	0	0
Taylor Peay	DF	United States	2018	11	0	0	0	0	0	0
Pecka	MF	Brazil	2015	6	0	0	0	0	0	0
Demar Phillips	DF	Jamaica	2015-18	65	0	7	12	2	72	12
Rusty Pierce	DF	United States	2005	15	0	1	3	0	0	0
**Ariath Piol**	FW	Australia	2025-	24	1	0	1	0	0	
Joao Plata	FW	Ecuador	2013-19	175	46	43	7	0	5	2
Eddie Pope	DF	United States	2005-07	71	2	0	6	1	82	8
Justin Portillo	MF	United States	2019-21	11	0	0	2	1	0	0
Noah Powder	DF	(Trinidad and Tobago) Trinidad & Tobago	2019-21	7	0	0	1	0	12	2
**Philip Quinton**	DF	United States	2024-	35	1	0	2	0	0	0
Jeizon Ramírez	FW	Venezuela	2020-21	10	0	0	1	0	0	0
Pierre Reedy	DF	United States	2022	1	0	0	0	0	0	0
Marlon Rojas	DF	Trinidad and Tobago	2005	7	0	0	1	0	23	0
Giuseppe Rossi	MF	Italy	2020	7	1	0	2	1	4	1
Kelyn Rowe	MF	United States	2019	4	0	0	2	1	4	1
Rubio Rubin	FW	Guatemala	2021-2024	79	11	7	4	0	27	10
**Pablo Ruiz**	MF	Argentina	2018-	122	7	16	33	1	0	0
Albert Rusnák	FW	Slovakia	2017-21	140	41	39	10	0	37	7
Johnny Russell	FW	Scotland	2025	12	2	0	1	0	14	1
Robbie Russell	DF	United States	2008-11	105	1	12	12	1	0	0
Álvaro Saborío	FW	Costa Rica	2010-15	159	79	13	23	0	105	35
Carlos Salcedo	DF	Mexico	2013-14	30	1	0	7	0	5	0
Devon Sandoval	FW	United States	2013-2017	86	11	3	4	0	0	0
Sebastian Saucedo	MF	United States	2015-19	83	5	11	9	1	0	0
Jefferson Savarino	FW	Venezuela	2017-19; 2022-2023	125	35	33	6	1	27	2
Robert Scarlett	DF	Jamaica	2005	9	0	2	0	0	38	3
Justin Schmidt	DF	United States	2017	9	0	0	0	0	0	0
Tate Schmitt	FW	United States	2019-22	24	2	0	4	0	0	0
Chris Schuler	DF	United States	2010-17	96	5	2	15	0	0	0
Dipsy Selolwane	FW	Botswana	2005	9	0	0	0	0	42	16
Douglas Sequeira	MF	Costa Rica	2006	19	1	0	3	1	42	2
Luis Silva	MF	Mexico	2015; 2017-18	59	12	4	5	0	0	0
Marcelo Silva	DF	Uruguay	2017-2024	131	4	0	22	2	0	0
Tommy Silva	DF	United States	2024-2025	1	0	0	0	0	0	0
Jafet Soto	MF	Costa Rica	2006	8	1	0	0	0	63	10
Jonny Steele	MF	Northern Ireland	2012	34	2	2	6	0	3	0
Khari Stephenson	MF	Jamaica	2013	25	3	1	2	0	32	3
John Stertzer	MF	United States	2013-16	48	1	1	9	1	0	0
Stephen Sunday	MF	Nigeria	2016-18	59	1	3	18	0	1	0
Jack Stewart	DF	United States	2006-07	28	0	1	2	1	0	0
Nathan Sturgis	MF	United States	2007-08	8	0	0	1	0	0	0
Carey Talley	DF	United States	2006-08	63	6	9	14	1	0	0
Terukazu Tanaka	DF	Japan	2012	5	0	1	0	0	0	0
Melvin Tarley	FW	Liberia	2005	9	1	1	0	0	2	0
Luis Tejada	FW	Panama	2007	1	0	0	0	0	98	43
Donny Toia	DF	United States	2011; 2019-21	63	1	4	11	0	0	0
Daniel Torres	DF	Costa Rica	2006-07	28	0	0	3	0	1	0
Seth Trembly	DF	United States	2005-06	23	3	1	8	0	0	0
Elias Vasquez	DF	Guatemala	2015	20	0	0	4	0	36	0
Ricardo Velazco	FW	United States	2016-17	9	0	0	1	0	0	0
Sebastian Velasquez	MF	Colombia	2012-14	50	2	5	2	0	0	0
**Brayan Vera**	DF	Colombia	2023-	75	6	4	28	1	1	0
David Viana	MF	Portugal	2012-13	2	0	0	0	0	0	0
Blake Wagner	MF	United States	2011	2	0	0	0	0	0	0
Collen Warner	MF	United States	2010-11	45	1	6	8	1	0	0
Dante Washington	FW	United States	2005	10	0	1	0	0	0	0
Jamie Watson	MF	United States	2005-07	42	3	1	3	1	0	0
Kwame Watson-Siriboe	DF	United States	2012-14	23	0	0	4	0	0	0
Evan Whitfield	DF	United States	2005	5	0	0	1	0	0	0
Andy Williams	MF	Jamaica	2005-11	222	19	29	27	3	97	20
Chris Wingert	DF	United States	2007-14; 2016-17	247	2	14	48	2	1	0
Tyler Wolff	FW	United States	2025-	13	0	0	1	0	0	0
Bobby Wood	FW	United States	2021-22	31	5	2	0	0	45	13
Joey Worthen	FW	United States	2006-07	5	0	0	0	0	0	0
**DeAndre Yedlin**	DF	United States	2025-	7	1	0	3	0	81	0

=== Goalkeepers ===
These players have appeared in at least one match for Real Salt Lake.

Competitive matches only. Players in bold are currently on the team roster.

As of the end of the 2025 Major League Soccer season.

Player			Total				
Name	Country	Years	Caps	Shutouts	Cautions	Ejections	Int'l Caps
Jeff Attinella	United States	2013-16	38	5	0	0	0
Gavin Beavers	United States	2022-2024	34	3	0	0	0
**Rafael Cabral**	Brazil	2025-	34	0	0	3	
D.J. Countess	United States	2005	27	4	1	0	0
Scott Garlick	United States	2006	31	4	6	0	0
Zac MacMath	United States	2020-2025	98	30	0	0	0
Jay Nolly	United States	2005-06	10	0	1	0	0
David Ochoa	Mexico	2019-21	26	5	0	0	0
Andrew Putna	United States	2017-21	25	6	0	0	0
Kyle Reynish	United States	2008-2012	14	4	0	0	0
Nick Rimando	United States	2007-19	369	118	6	0	21
Josh Saunders	Puerto Rico	2013	6	0	0	0	2
Chris Seitz	United States	2007-09	11	1	0	0	0
Matt Van Oekel	United States	2017	7	1	0	0	0

== By nationality ==
Nationality	Number of Players
United States	122
Argentina	11
Jamaica	9
Colombia	7
Brazil	6
Mexico	6
Costa Rica	5
Nigeria	4
Trinidad and Tobago	4
Guatemala	3
Liberia	3
Venezuela	3
Armenia	2
(Armenia) Australia	2
Canada	2
Croatia	2
Cuba	2
Ecuador	2
England	2
Germany	2
Honduras	2
Ivory Coast	2
Netherlands	2
Paraguay	2
Portugal}	2
Puerto Rico	2
Scotland	2
Spain	2
Botswana	1
El Salvador	1
France	1
(The Gambia) Gambia	1
Ghana	1
Greece	1
Haiti	1
Iraq	1
Italy	1
Japan	1
Morocco	1
New Zealand	1
Northern Ireland	1
Panama	1
Poland	1
Rwanda	1
Saint Kitts and Nevis	1
Slovakia	1
Switzerland	1
Ukraine	1
Uruguay	1
Wales	1
