= 2017 Real Salt Lake season =

American soccer team season

Real Salt Lake
2017 season
- Owner: Dell Loy Hansen
- Coach: Jeff Cassar (until March 20); Mike Petke (from March 29)
- Stadium: Rio Tinto Stadium
- Major League Soccer: Conference: 8th Overall: 14th
- MLS Cup Playoffs: Did not qualify
- U.S. Open Cup: 4th Round
- Rocky Mountain Cup: Champions
- Top goalscorer: League: 4 players (7): Yura Movsisyan; Joao Plata; Albert Rusnák; Luis Silva; All: Luis Silva (8)
- Highest home attendance: 20,348 (vs. LA Galaxy – March 18)
- Lowest home attendance: 16,434 (vs. New York City FC – May 17)
- Average home league attendance: 18,781
- Biggest win: LA 2-6 RSL (7/4)
- Biggest defeat: DAL 6-2 RSL (6/3)
Home colors	Away colors

The 2017 Real Salt Lake season was the team's 13th year of existence, and their 13th consecutive season in Major League Soccer, the top division of the American soccer pyramid.

== Background ==
On March 20, the club announced that Head Coach Jeff Cassar had been dismissed from his duties after only three games into the season. Daryl Shore was named interim head coach for the two games against the New York Red Bulls and Minnesota United FC. On March 29 it was announced that Mike Petke would take over the head coaching position following the game against Minnesota United FC on April 1.

== Non-competitive ==
=== Preseason ===
==== Desert friendlies ====
January 31, 2017 Friendly	New York Red Bulls	0–1	Real Salt Lake	Tucson, Arizona
11:00 a.m. MT		Report	Allen 83'	Stadium: Kino Sports Complex; Referee: Allen Chapman

February 3, 2017 Friendly	San Jose Earthquakes	1–1	Real Salt Lake	Tucson, Arizona
11:00 a.m. MT	Wondolowski 32'	Report	Bernárdez 16' (o.g.)	Stadium: Kino Sports Complex; Referee: Ricardo Salazar

==== Portland Timbers Preseason Tournament ====
February 9, 2017 Friendly	Portland Timbers	3–3	Real Salt Lake	Portland, Oregon
8:30 p.m. MT	Valeri (yellow card) 13', (goal) 35', 45' (pen.); Powell (yellow card) 24'; Chará (red card) 42'; Mattocks 51'; McInerney (yellow card) 85'	Report	Movsisyan (yellow card) 24'; Mulholland (yellow card) 24', (goal) 53'; Plata 43'; Holness 66'	Stadium: Providence Park; Attendance: 10,117; Referee: Sorin Stoica

February 12, 2017 Friendly	Real Salt Lake	1–1	Vancouver Whitecaps FC	Portland, Oregon
3:30 p.m. MT	Sunny (yellow card) 77'; Allen 83'	Report	Techera (yellow card) 58'; Williams (yellow card) 59'; Reyna 70'	Stadium: Providence Park

February 15, 2017 Friendly	Real Salt Lake	3–3	Minnesota United FC	Portland, Oregon
6:00 p.m. MT	Movsisyan 57' (pen.); Barrett 79'; Brody 87'	Report	Molino 24', 49'; Venegas 93+'	Stadium: Providence Park; Referee: Fotis Bazakos

==== Southern California ====
February 21, 2017 Friendly	LA Galaxy	0–1	Real Salt Lake	Carson, California
1:00 p.m. MT	Villarreal 40'	Report		Stadium: StubHub Center pracite field Attendance: closed door

February 25, 2017 Friendly	Real Salt Lake	2–1	Alashkert FC	Irvine, California
p.m. MT	Movsisyan 43'; Barrett 92+'	Report	Alashkert 8'

=== Friendly ===
July 17, 2017	Real Salt Lake	1–2	Manchester United	Sandy, Utah
8:00 p.m. MT	L. Silva 23'	Report	Mkhitaryan 29'; Lukaku 39'; Valencia (red card) 68'	Stadium: Rio Tinto Stadium; Attendance: 20,241; Referee: Allen Chapman

== Competitions ==
=== MLS regular season ===
==== Standings ====
===== Western Conference Table =====
Pos	Team	Pld	W	L	T	GF	GA	GD	Pts	Qualification
6	San Jose Earthquakes	34	13	14	7	39	60	−21	46	MLS Cup Knockout Round
7	FC Dallas	34	11	10	13	48	48	0	46	
8	Real Salt Lake	34	13	15	6	48	56	−8	45	
9	Minnesota United FC	34	10	18	6	47	70	−23	36	
10	Colorado Rapids	34	9	19	6	31	51	−20	33	

Source: MLS

===== Overall table =====
Pos	Team	Pld	W	L	T	GF	GA	GD	Pts
12	San Jose Earthquakes	34	13	14	7	39	60	−21	46
13	FC Dallas	34	11	10	13	48	48	0	46
14	Real Salt Lake	34	13	15	6	49	55	−6	45
15	New England Revolution	34	13	15	6	53	61	−8	45
16	Philadelphia Union	34	11	14	9	50	47	+3	42

Source: MLS
Rules for classification: 1) points; 2) total wins; 3) total goal differential; 4) total goals scored; 5) disciplinary points; 6) away goals scored; 7) away goal differential; 8) coin toss or drawing of lots

==== Results summary ====
Overall								Home						Away					
Pld	Pts	W	L	T	GF	GA	GD	W	L	T	GF	GA	GD	W	L	T	GF	GA	GD
34	45	13	15	6	49	55	−6	9	4	4	26	16	+10	4	11	2	23	39	−16

Last updated: October 23, 2017
Source: MLS Results
Pld = Matches played; Pts = Points; W = Matches won; T = Matches tied; L = Matches lost; GF = Goals for; GA = Goals against; GD = Goal difference

==== Match results ====
March 4, 2017 1	Real Salt Lake	0–0	Toronto FC	Sandy, Utah
2:30 p.m. MDT	Schuler (yellow card) 23'; Rimando (yellow card) 29'; Sunny (yellow card) 72'	Report	Hagglund (yellow card) 45'; Beitashour (yellow card) 53'; Giovinco (yellow card) 82'; Altidore (yellow card) 90+2'	Stadium: Rio Tinto Stadium; Attendance: 19,516; Referee: Allan Chapman

March 11, 2017 2	Chicago Fire	2–0	Real Salt Lake	Bridgeview, Illinois
12:00 pm MDT	Nikolic 11'; Alvarez 15'	Report	Wingert (yellow card) 79'	Stadium: Toyota Park; Attendance: 13,024; Referee: Kevin Stott

March 18, 2017 3	Real Salt Lake	1–2	LA Galaxy	Sandy, Utah
7:30 p.m. MDT	Movsisyan 18'; Mulholland (yellow card) 34'; Beckerman (yellow card) 34' (yellow-red card) 43'; Rusnák (yellow card) 61'; Schuler (yellow card) 90'	Report	Alessandrini (yellow card) 45+'; Romney 70'; Boateng 74'; Smith (yellow card) 89'	Stadium: Rio Tinto Stadium; Attendance: 20,348; Referee: Sorin Stoica

March 25, 2017 4	New York Red Bulls	0–0	Real Salt Lake	Harrison, New Jersey
5:30 pm MDT	Lawrence (yellow card) 42'	Report	Mulholland (yellow card) 57'; L. Silva (yellow card) 66'; Sunny (yellow card) 69'; Maund (yellow card) 70'; Velazco (yellow card) 87'	Stadium: Red Bull Arena; Attendance: 16,213; Referee: Chris Penso

April 1, 2017 5	Minnesota United FC	4–2	Real Salt Lake	Minneapolis, Minnesota
6:00 pm MDT	Molino 16', (yellow card) 20'; Calvo (yellow card) 34'; Ramirez 52', 62'; Venegas 69'	Report	Mulholland 4'; Movsisyan (yellow card) 49', (goal) 88'	Stadium: TCF Bank Stadium; Attendance: 17,728; Referee: Armando Villareal

April 8, 2017 6	Real Salt Lake	3–0	Vancouver Whitecaps FC	Sandy, Utah
7:30 pm MDT	Schuler (yellow card) 40'; Beckerman (yellow card) 42'; Rusnak 54'; Movsisyan 74'; Mulholland 78'	Report	Laba (yellow card) 30'	Stadium: Rio Tinto Stadium; Attendance: 17,069; Referee: Baldomero Toledo

April 15, 2017 7 (RMC)	Colorado Rapids	1–2	Real Salt Lake	Commerce City, Colorado
7:00 pm MDT	Doyle 29'; Williams (yellow card) 84'; Watts (red card) 85'	Report	Wingert (yellow card) 52'; Movsisyan 85' (pen.); Lennon 88'	Stadium: Dick's Sporting Goods Park; Attendance: 15,087; Referee: Ismail Elfath

April 22, 2017 8	Real Salt Lake	1–3	Atlanta United FC	Sandy, Utah
7:30 p.m. MDT	Beckerman (yellow card) 21'; Rusnak 70'	Report	Villalba 10'; Carmona (yellow card) 38'; Asad 47'; Garza (yellow card) 77'; Almirón (yellow card) 84'; Kann (yellow card) 90+3'; Vazquez 90+6'	Stadium: Rio Tinto Stadium; Attendance: 18,946; Referee: Ricardo Salazar

April 29, 2017 9	Sporting Kansas City	3–0	Real Salt Lake	Kansas City, Kansas
6:30 pm MDT	Feilhaber 17', (yellow card) 49'; Dwyer 51'; Espinoza (yellow card) 55'; Zusi (yellow card) 69'; Gerso (yellow card) 84', (goal) 90+5'	Report	Mulholland (yellow card) 39'; Phillips (yellow card) 51'; Movsisyan (yellow card) 55'; Lennon (yellow card) 85'	Stadium: Children's Mercy Park; Attendance: 18,648; Referee: Jose Carlos Rivero

May 6, 2017 10	Real Salt Lake	0–3	FC Dallas	Sandy, Utah
7:30 p.m. MDT		Report	Urruti 3' (pen.), (yellow card) 57', (goal) 90+'; Hedges 67'; Colmán (yellow card) 79'	Stadium: Rio Tinto Stadium; Attendance: 18,160; Referee: Drew Fischer

May 13, 2017 11	New England Revolution	4–0	Real Salt Lake	Foxborough, Massachusetts
5:30 pm MDT	Caldwell 4', (yellow card) 29'; Kamara 18'; Fagundez 34'; Nguyen 41'; Farrell (yellow card) 79'	Report	Holness (yellow card) 35'; Velazco (yellow card) 44'; Hernandez (yellow card) 80'; L. Silva (yellow card) 84'	Stadium: Gillette Stadium; Attendance: 21,096; Referee: Hilario Grejeda

May 17, 2017 12	Real Salt Lake	2–1	New York City FC	Sandy, Utah
7:00 p.m. MDT	Movsisyan (yellow card) 16'; Schuler (yellow card) 23'; Rusnák 38'; Maund 51'	Report	Okoli 4'; White (yellow card) 21'; McNamara (yellow card) 45'	Stadium: Rio Tinto Stadium; Attendance: 16,434; Referee: Silviu Petrescu

May 20, 2017 13	Seattle Sounders FC	1–0	Real Salt Lake	Seattle, Washington
3:00 pm MDT	Shipp 42'	Report	Sunny (yellow card) 25'; Beckerman (yellow card) 75'	Stadium: CenturyLink Field; Attendance: 40,588; Referee: Kevin Stott

May 27, 2017 14	Real Salt Lake	1–0	Philadelphia Union	Sandy, Utah
6:00 p.m. MDT	L. Silva (yellow card) 28'; Plata 36'; Wingert (yellow card) 52'	Report	Onyewu (yellow card) 70'; Bedoya (yellow card) 77'	Stadium: Rio Tinto Stadium; Attendance: 18,305; Referee: Fotis Bazakos

May 31, 2017 15	Houston Dynamo	5–1	Real Salt Lake	Houston, Texas
6:30 pm MDT	Schmidt 3' (o.g.); Alex 15'; Manotas 45'; Torres 52'; Cabezas (yellow card) 57'; Leonardo 68'; Garcia (yellow card) 79'	Report	Sunny (yellow card) 54'; Plata 63'	Stadium: BBVA Compass Stadium; Attendance: 14,148; Referee: Ricardo Salazar

June 3, 2017 16	FC Dallas	6–2	Real Salt Lake	Frisco, Texas
6:00 pm MDT	Lamah 8', 22', 31'; Urruti 40'; Akindele 43'; Ferreira 89'	Report	Beltran (yellow card) 42'; Holness 70'; Beckerman 72'	Stadium: Toyota Stadium; Attendance: 14,016; Referee: Nima Saghafi

June 17, 2017 17	Real Salt Lake	1–0	Minnesota United FC	Sandy, Utah
8:00 p.m. MDT	Beckerman (yellow card) 75'; Movsisyan 85'	Report	Kallman (yellow card) 21'; Ibson (yellow card) 86'	Stadium: Rio Tinto Stadium; Attendance: 19,256; Referee: Marco de Oliveira

June 24, 2017 18	San Jose Earthquakes	2–1	Real Salt Lake	San Jose, California
8:30 pm MDT	Hoesen 13'; Imperiale (yellow card) 50'; Lima (yellow card) 67' (yellow-red card) 71'; Urena 68'	Report	Saucedo (yellow card) 89'; Hernandez 90+4'	Stadium: Avaya Stadium; Attendance: 18,000; Referee: Fotis Bazakos

June 30, 2017 19	Real Salt Lake	0–1	Orlando City SC	Sandy, Utah
7:30 p.m. MDT	Sunny (yellow card) 65'; Beckerman (yellow card) 88'	Report	Johnson 17'; Kaká (yellow card) 68'; Aja (yellow card) 71'; Higuita (yellow card) 87'	Stadium: Rio Tinto Stadium; Attendance: 19,218; Referee: Robert Sibiga

July 4, 2017 20	LA Galaxy	2–6	Real Salt Lake	Carson, California
8:30 pm MDT	Cole 41'; Jamieson 89'	Report	Phillips (yellow card) 26'; Rusnak 36'; Holness 45+1'; Movsisyan 62'; Savarino 72', 77'; Plata 80'	Stadium: StubHub Center; Attendance: 25,667; Referee: Kevin Stott

July 19, 2017 21	Portland Timbers	1–4	Real Salt Lake	Portland, Oregon
8:30 pm MDT	Olum (yellow card) 28'; Valentin (yellow card) 41'; Valeri (yellow card) 45+5'; Arboleda (red card) 53'; Adi (red card) 56'; Barmby (yellow card) 81', (goal) 90+3'	Report	Beckerman 10', (red card) 56'; Rusnak (yellow card) 42', (goal) 68'; Acosta (yellow card) 46'; Plata 50' (pen.), 80'; Horst (yellow card) 57'	Stadium: Providence Park; Attendance: 21,114; Referee: Baldomero Toledo

July 22, 2017 22	Real Salt Lake	1–1	Sporting Kansas City	Sandy, Utah
8:00 p.m. MDT	L. Silva 43'; Sunny (yellow card) 53'; Acosta (yellow card) 56'; Beltran (yellow card) 71'	Report	Espinoza (yellow card) 40'; Sanchez (yellow card) 47'; Feilhaber 59' (pen.); Fernandes (yellow card) 77'	Stadium: Rio Tinto Stadium; Attendance: 19,316; Referee: Nima Saghafi

July 29, 2017 23	Real Salt Lake	2–2	Columbus Crew SC	Sandy, Utah
8:00 p.m. MDT	Plata 50' (pen.); Savarino 54'; Saucedo (yellow card) 88'	Report	Kamara 16', 60'	Stadium: Rio Tinto Stadium; Attendance: 18,758; Referee: Kevin Stott

August 5, 2017 24	Real Salt Lake	0–0	Houston Dynamo	Sandy, Utah
8:00 p.m. MDT	Glad (yellow card) 60'; Beckerman (yellow card) 71'	Report	Alex (yellow card) 64' (yellow-red card) 65'; Elis (yellow card) 81'; DeLaGarza (yellow card) 90+4'	Stadium: Rio Tinto Stadium; Attendance: 19,075; Referee: Robert Sibiga

August 12/13, 2017† 25	D.C. United	0–1	Real Salt Lake	Washington, D.C.
5:00 pm MDT	Arriola (yellow card) 64'	Report	Wingert (yellow card) 62'; L. Silva 64'	Stadium: RFK Stadium; Attendance: 14,193; Referee: Drew Fischer

August 19, 2017 26	Montreal Impact	3–1	Real Salt Lake	Montreal, Quebec
5:30 pm MDT	Piatti 11', 29'; Jackson-Hamel 47'; Bush (yellow card) 62'	Report	L. Silva 26', (yellow card) 78'; Lennon (yellow card) 39'; Sunday (yellow card) 45+'; Wingert (yellow card) 57'; Beltran (yellow card) 66'; Horst (yellow card) 85'	Stadium: Saputo Stadium; Attendance: 19,541; Referee: Chris Penso

August 23, 2017 27	Real Salt Lake	4–0	San Jose Earthquakes	Sandy, Utah
8:00 p.m. MDT	Mulholland (yellow card) 24'; L. Silva 29'; Beckerman (yellow card) 60'; Savarino 68'; Rusnák 80'; Movsisyan 90+3'	Report	Affolter (yellow card) 31'; Godoy (yellow card) 33' (yellow-red card) 61'	Stadium: Rio Tinto Stadium; Attendance: 17,460; Referee: Silviu Petrescu

August 26, 2017 28 (RMC)	Real Salt Lake	4–1	Colorado Rapids	Sandy, Utah
8:00 p.m. MDT	Glad (yellow card) 32'; Plata 41'; L. Silva 50', (yellow card) 50', (goal) 90+2'; Acosta (red card) 57'; Lennon 90+5'	Report	Gordon (yellow card) 73' (yellow-red card) 77'; Gatt 82'; Doyle (yellow card) 90+4'	Stadium: Rio Tinto Stadium; Attendance: 18,855; Referee: Armando Villarreal

September 9, 2017 29	Vancouver Whitecaps FC	3–2	Real Salt Lake	Vancouver, British Columbia
pm MDT	Parker (yellow card) 21'; Techera 29'; Waston 52'; Nerwinski (yellow card) 57'; Reyna (64])	Report	Wingert 37'; Beltran 83'; Plata (yellow card) 90+1'	Stadium: BC Place; Attendance: 20,783; Referee: Allen Chapman

September 16, 2017 30	Real Salt Lake	2–1	Portland Timbers	Sandy, Utah
7:30 pm MDT	Rusnák 14'; Savarino 61'; Beckerman (yellow card) 68'; Movsisyan (yellow card) 87'	Report	Valeri 47'; Nagbe (yellow card) 70'	Stadium: Rio Tinto Stadium; Attendance: 19,677; Referee: Robert Sibiga

September 23, 2017 31	Real Salt Lake	2–0	Seattle Sounders FC	Sandy, Utah
7:30 pm MDT	Savarino 52'; Mulholland 66'	Report	Leerdam (yellow card) 57'; Neagle (yellow card) 90+'	Stadium: Rio Tinto Stadium; Attendance: 19,786; Referee: Sorin Stoica

September 30, 2017 32	LA Galaxy	1-1	Real Salt Lake	Carson, California
8:30 p.m. MDT	Zardes (yellow card) 31'; Jamieson 41', (yellow card) 48'; Alessandrini (yellow card) 85'	Report	M. Silva (red card) 14'; Horst (yellow card) 81'; Beckerman 90+'	Stadium: StubHub Center; Attendance: 20,234; Referee: Rubiel Vazquez

October 15, 2017 33 (RMC)	Colorado Rapids	1–0	Real Salt Lake	Commerce City, Colorado
3:00 pm MDT	Gatt 3'; Badji (yellow card) 24'; Boateng (yellow card) 90+5'	Report	Horst (yellow card) 43'	Stadium: Dick's Sporting Goods Park; Attendance: 13,102; Referee: Armando Villareal

October 22, 2017 34	Real Salt Lake	2-1	Sporting Kansas City	Sandy, Utah
2:00 p.m. MDT	L. Silva 3'; Lennon 41'	Report	Sallói (yellow card) 28'; Besler (yellow card) 72'; Opara 89'	Stadium: Rio Tinto Stadium; Attendance: 19,102; Referee: Ricardo Salazar

†Originally scheduled for August 12; match postponed in 29th minute due to weather conditions. The match resumed on August 13.

=== U.S. Open Cup ===
June 14 4R	Sacramento Republic FC	4–1	Real Salt Lake	Sacramento, California
7:30 PM PDT	Williams (yellow card) 19'; Caesar 30'; Cazarez 43'; Hall 45+1' (pen.); Barrera (yellow card) 69', (goal) 71'	Report	Velazco 35'	Stadium: Papa Murphy's Park; Attendance: 11,569; Referee: Alex Chilowicz

== Stats ==
- Stats from MLS Regular season, MLS playoffs, CONCACAF Champions league, and U.S. Open Cup are all included.

As of October 23, 2017

Goals
Rank	Player	Nation	Goals
1	Yura Movsisyan	(Armenia)	7
1	Joao Plata	(Ecuador)	7
1	Albert Rusnák	(Slovakia)	7
1	Luis Silva	(United States)	7
5	Jefferson Savarino	(Venezuela)	6
6	Kyle Beckerman	(United States)	4
7	Brooks Lennon	(United States)	3
7	Luke Mulholland	(England)	3
9	Tony Beltran	(United States)	1
9	José Hernández	(Mexico)	1
9	Omar Holness	(Jamaica)	1
9	Aaron Maund	(United States)	1
9	Ricardo Velazco	(United States)	1
9	Chris Wingert	(United States)	1

Assists
Rank	Player	Nation	Assists
1	Albert Rusnák	(Slovakia)	13
2	Joao Plata	(Ecuador)	5
2	Jefferson Savarino	(Venezuela)	5
4	Luke Mulholland	(England)	4
5	Brooks Lennon	(United States)	3
5	Luis Silva	(United States)	3
7	Danilo Acosta	(United States)	2
7	Demar Phillips	(Jamaica)	2
7	Sebastian Saucedo	(United States)	2
10	Tony Beltran	(United States)	1
10	Omar Holness	(Jamaica)	1
10	David Horst	(United States)	1
10	Stephen Sunday	(Nigeria)	1

Shutouts
Rank	Player	Nation	Shutouts
1	Nick Rimando	(United States)	8
2	Matt Van Oekel	(United States)	1

== Club ==
=== Roster ===
- Age calculated as of the start of the 2017 season.

As of September 11, 2017

No.	Position	Player	Nation	Age
2	DF	Tony Beltran	United States	29
3	DF	Reagan Dunk	United States	23
4	DF	David Horst	United States	31
5	MF	Kyle Beckerman (Captain)	United States	34
6	DF	Justin Schmidt	United States	23
7	MF	Jefferson Savarino (DP); on loan from Zulia FC	Venezuela	20
8	MF	Stephen Sunday	Nigeria	28
10	FW	Joao Plata	Ecuador	25
11	MF	Albert Rusnák	Slovakia	22
12	MF	Omar Holness (GA)	Jamaica	22
13	FW	Chad Barrett	United States	31
14	FW	Yura Movsisyan (DP)	Armenia	29
15	DF	Justen Glad (HGP)	United States	20
16	DF	Chris Wingert	United States	34
17	DF	Demar Phillips	Jamaica	33
18	GK	Nick Rimando	United States	37
19	MF	Luke Mulholland	England	28
20	MF	Luis Silva	United States	28
22	FW	Ricardo Velazco (HGP)	United States	23
23	FW	Sebastian Saucedo (HGP)	Mexico	20
24	GK	Matt Van Oekel	United States	30
25	DF	Danilo Acosta (HGP)	United States	19
27	FW	Brooks Lennon on loan from Liverpool	United States	19
28	DF	Chris Schuler	United States	29
29	MF	José Hernández (HGP)	Mexico	20
30	DF	Marcelo Silva	Uruguay	27
43	MF	Nick Besler	United States	23
50	GK	Connor Sparrow	United States	22
70	FW	Jordan Allen	United States	21

=== Transfers ===
As of September 11, 2017

==== In ====
Player	Position	Previous club	Fees/Notes	Date
(Mexico) Sebastian Saucedo	MF	(Mexico) Veracruz	Return From Loan; HGP	12/12/16
(Mexico) José Hernández	MF	(United States) UCLA Bruins	Homegrown Player	12/20/16
(United States) Matt Van Oekel	GK	(Canada) FC Edmonton	Free Transfer	12/22/16
(Slovakia) Albert Rusnák	MF	(Netherlands) FC Groningen	Undisclosed	1/6/17
(United States) Chad Barrett	FW	(United States) San Jose Earthquakes	Free Agent	1/26/17
(United States) David Horst	DF	(United States) Portland Timbers	Free Agent	1/26/17
(United States) Luis Silva	MF	(Mexico) Tigres UANL	Free transfer	1/26/17
(United States) Reagan Dunk	DF	(United States) Denver	2017 MLS SuperDraft pick #13.	01/13/17
(United States) Justin Schmidt	DF	(United States) Washington, Washington Crossfire	2017 MLS SuperDraft pick #35.	01/13/17
(Uruguay) Marcelo Silva	DF	(Spain) Real Zaragoza	Undisclosed	7/03/17
(United States) Nick Besler	MF	(United States) Real Monarchs	Free transfer	8/24/17
(United States) Connor Sparrow	GK	(United States) Real Monarchs	Free transfer	9/11/17

==== Out ====
Player	Position	Next Club	Fees/Notes	Date
(Argentina) Javier Morales	MF	(United States) FC Dallas	option declined	11/30/16
(Colombia) Jamison Olave	DF	Retired/RSL Academy coach	option declined	11/30/16
(United States) Boyd Okwuonu	DF	unattached	option declined	11/30/16
(Democratic Republic of the Congo) Phanuel Kavita	DF	Puerto Rico FC	option declined	11/30/16
(United States) John Stertzer	MF	(United States) New York City FC	option declined	11/30/16
(Guyana) Emery Welshman	FW	Puerto Rico FC	option declined	11/30/16
(Colombia) Olmes Garcia	FW	(United States) San Jose Earthquakes	option declined	11/30/16
(Paraguay) Pedro Báez (footballer)	FW	(Paraguay) Cerro Porteño	loan expired	11/30/16
(United States) Devon Sandoval	FW	(United States) San Francisco Deltas	out of contract	11/30/16
(Argentina) Juan Manuel Martínez	FW	(Argentina) Vélez Sársfield	Mutually agreed to end contract	12/07/16
(United States) Jeff Attinella	GK	(United States) Portland Timbers	2016 MLS Expansion Draft to Minnesota United FC traded to Portland Timbers	12/13/16
(United States) Aaron Maund	DF	(Canada) Vancouver Whitecaps FC	Trade for third-round pick, 2018 MLS SuperDraft	8/9/17
(Mexico) Lalo Fernández	GK	(Mexico) Tigres UANL	Undisclosed	9/5/17

=== Loans ===
==== In ====
Player	Position	Loaned from	Fees/Notes	Date
(United States) Brooks Lennon	FW	(England) Liverpool F.C.	for 2017 season only	02/06/17
(Venezuela) Jefferson Savarino	MF	(Venezuela) Zulia FC	Young DP	05/09/17

==== Out ====
Player	Position	Loaned to	Fees/Notes	Date

=== Trialist ===
Player	Position	Previous team	Notes	Date	Result
(United States) Reagan Dunk	DF	Denver	2017 MLS SuperDraft pick #13.	01/13/17	Signed with RSL
(United States) Justin Schmidt	DF	Washington, Washington Crossfire	2017 MLS SuperDraft pick #35.	01/13/17	Signed with RSL
(United States) Andrew Putna	GK	UIC, Chicago Fire U-23	2017 MLS SuperDraft pick #48.	01/17/17	Signed with Real Monarchs

== See also ==
- 2017 Real Monarchs season
