= 2018 Real Salt Lake season =

American soccer team season

Real Salt Lake
2018 season
- Owner: Dell Loy Hansen
- Coach: Mike Petke
- Stadium: Rio Tinto Stadium
- Major League Soccer: Conference: Overall:
- U.S. Open Cup: 4th Round
- Rocky Mountain Cup: Champions
- Highest home attendance: 21,363 (vs. LA Galaxy – September 1)
- Lowest home attendance: 16,015 (vs. Vancouver Whitecaps FC – April 7)
- Average home league attendance: 18,605
- Biggest win: COL 0-6 RSL (8/25)
- Biggest defeat: RSL 1-5 LAFC (3/10)
| Home colors | Away colors |

The 2018 Real Salt Lake season is the team's 14th year of existence, and their 14th consecutive season in Major League Soccer, the top division of the American soccer pyramid.

== Non-competitive ==
=== Preseason ===
==== Mobile Mini Sun Cup ====
| February 3, 2018 Friendly | Real Salt Lake | 3–1 | LA Galaxy | Tucson, Arizona |
| 3:30 p.m. MT | Saucedo 51' (pen.); Besler 56'; Velásquez 77' | Report | Kitchen (yellow card) 11'; Arellano (yellow card) 62'; Ciani 33' | Stadium: North Stadium- Kino Sports Complex; Attendance: 2,931 |

| February 7, 2018 Friendly | San Jose Earthquakes | 1–1 | Real Salt Lake | Tucson, Arizona |
| 10:30 a.m. MT | Salinas (yellow card) 43'; Amarikwa 60' | Report | Acosta (yellow card) 34'; Ortuño 54' | Stadium: North Stadium- Kino Sports Complex; Referee: Baldomero Toledo |

==== Orlando ====
| February 17, 2018 Friendly | Orlando City SC | 5–2 | Real Salt Lake | Orlando, Florida |
| 3:30 p.m. MT | | Report | Plata (pen.); Silva |
Note: played in two scrimmages of 75 min each

| February 22, 2018 Friendly | Real Salt Lake | 2–1 | New York City FC | Orlando, Florida |
| 3:30 p.m. MT | Silva 14'; Plata 62' | Report | 89' (pen.) |

=== Friendly ===
| July 10, 2018 Friendly | Real Salt Lake | 1–1 | Eintracht Frankfurt | Sandy, Utah |
| 3:30 p.m. MT | Brody 10'; Ruíz (yellow card) 36' | Report | Ćavar (yellow card) 81'; Müller 93+' | Stadium: Rio Tinto Stadium; Attendance: 5,417; Referee: Alan Chapman |

== Competitions ==
=== MLS regular season ===
2018 Major League Soccer season

==== Standings ====
===== Western Conference Table =====
| Pos | Team | Pld | W | L | T | GF | GA | GD | Pts | Qualification |
|---|---|---|---|---|---|---|---|---|---|---|
| 4 | FC Dallas | 34 | 16 | 9 | 9 | 52 | 44 | +8 | 57 | MLS Cup Knockout Round |
| 5 | Portland Timbers | 34 | 15 | 10 | 9 | 54 | 48 | +6 | 54 | MLS Cup Knockout Round |
| 6 | Real Salt Lake | 34 | 14 | 13 | 7 | 55 | 58 | −3 | 49 | MLS Cup Knockout Round |
| 7 | LA Galaxy | 34 | 13 | 12 | 9 | 66 | 64 | +2 | 48 | |
| 8 | Vancouver Whitecaps FC | 34 | 13 | 13 | 8 | 54 | 67 | −13 | 47 | |

Source: MLS

===== Overall table =====
| Pos | Team | Pld | W | L | T | GF | GA | GD | Pts |
|---|---|---|---|---|---|---|---|---|---|
| 10 | Columbus Crew | 34 | 14 | 11 | 9 | 43 | 45 | −2 | 51 |
| 11 | Philadelphia Union | 34 | 15 | 14 | 5 | 49 | 50 | −1 | 50 |
| 12 | Real Salt Lake | 34 | 14 | 13 | 7 | 55 | 58 | −3 | 49 |
| 13 | LA Galaxy | 34 | 13 | 12 | 9 | 66 | 64 | +2 | 48 |
| 14 | Vancouver Whitecaps FC | 34 | 13 | 13 | 8 | 54 | 67 | −13 | 47 |

Source: MLS
Rules for classification: 1) points; 2) total wins; 3) total goal differential; 4) total goals scored; 5) disciplinary points; 6) away goals scored; 7) away goal differential; 8) coin toss or drawing of lots

==== Results summary ====
| Overall | | | | | | | | Home | | | | | | Away | | | | | |
| Pld | Pts | W | L | T | GF | GA | GD | W | L | T | GF | GA | GD | W | L | T | GF | GA | GD |
|---|---|---|---|---|---|---|---|---|---|---|---|---|---|---|---|---|---|---|---|
| 34 | 49 | 14 | 13 | 7 | 55 | 58 | −3 | 11 | 2 | 4 | 38 | 24 | +14 | 3 | 11 | 3 | 17 | 34 | −17 |

Last updated: October 22, 2018
Source: MLS Results
Pld = Matches played; Pts = Points; W = Matches won; T = Matches tied; L = Matches lost; GF = Goals for; GA = Goals against; GD = Goal difference

==== Match results ====
| March 3, 2018 1 | FC Dallas | 1–1 | Real Salt Lake | Frisco, Texas |
| 6:00 pm MDT | Hayes (yellow card) 64'; Barrios (yellow card) 77'; M. Silva 86' (o.g.) | Report | Plata 25' | Stadium: Toyota Stadium; Attendance: 16,116; Referee: Robert Sibiga |

| March 10, 2018 2 | Real Salt Lake | 1–5 | Los Angeles FC | Sandy, Utah |
| 1:30pm MDT | Plata 20'; Beckerman (yellow card) 29' | Report | Rossi 30', 81'; Blessing 33'; Feilhaber 47'; Vela 86' | Stadium: Rio Tinto Stadium; Attendance: 20,706; Referee: Baldomero Toledo |

| March 17, 2018 3 | Real Salt Lake | 1–0 | New York Red Bulls | Sandy, Utah |
| 7:00pm MDT | Rusnák 4' (pen.); Kreilach (yellow card) 37'; Lennon (yellow card) 43'; Phillips (yellow card) 59'; Baird (yellow card) 88' | Report | | Stadium: Rio Tinto Stadium; Attendance: 16,334; Referee: Ted Unkel |

| March 30, 2018 4 | Toronto FC | 3–1 | Real Salt Lake | Toronto, Ontario |
| 6:00pm MDT | Altidore 23' (pen.), (yellow card) 35', (goal) 45'; Giovinco (yellow card) 35'; Osorio (yellow card) 62'; Morgan (yellow card) 86'; Ricketts 90+' | Report | Beckerman (yellow card) 40'; Phillips (yellow card) 77'; Baird 82' | Stadium: BMO Field; Attendance: 28,006; Referee: Allen Chapman |

| April 7, 2018 5 | Real Salt Lake | 2–1 | Vancouver Whitecaps FC | Sandy, Utah |
| 7:30pm MDT | Henley (yellow card) 17'; M. Silva (yellow card) 28'; L. Silva 45+'; Glad (yellow card) 56'; Lennon (yellow card) 75'; Savarino 88' | Report | Waston (yellow card) 78'; Shea 90+' | Stadium: Rio Tinto Stadium; Attendance: 16,015; Referee: Marcos de Oliveira |

| April 11, 2018 6 | New York City FC | 4–0 | Real Salt Lake | New York, New York |
| 5:00pm MDT | Tajouri 12'; Moralez 30' (pen.); Berget 41'; Ofori 70' | Report | Beckerman (yellow card) 32' | Stadium: Yankee Stadium; Attendance: 18,603; Referee: Mark Geiger |

| April 21, 2018 7 (RMC) | Real Salt Lake | 3–0 | Colorado Rapids | Sandy, Utah |
| 7:00pm MDT | Besler (yellow card) 75'; Plata 82' (pen.); Kreilach 89'; Rusnák 92+' | Report | Howard (red card) 20'; Badji (yellow card) 32'; Boli (yellow card) 77'; Smith (yellow card) 81'; Boateng (yellow card) 91+' | Stadium: Rio Tinto Stadium; Attendance: 17,461; Referee: Joseph Dickerson |

| April 27, 2018 8 | Vancouver Whitecaps FC | 2–0 | Real Salt Lake | Vancouver, British Columbia |
| 8:30pm MDT | Techera (yellow card) 72' (yellow-red card) 76', (goal) 75' (pen.); Blondell 79'; Marinovic (yellow card) 91+'; Waston (yellow card) 95+' | Report | | Stadium: BC Place; Attendance: 19,283; Referee: Sorin Stoica |

| May 6, 2018 9 | Orlando City SC | 3–1 | Real Salt Lake | Orlando, Florida |
| 3:00pm MDT | Bendik (yellow card) 51'; El Monir (yellow card) 57'; Dwyer 60'; Sané 63'; Higuita (yellow card) 74'; Yotún 78' | Report | Baird 12' | Stadium: Orlando City Stadium; Attendance: 23,258; Referee: Robert Sibiga |

| May 12, 2018 10 | Real Salt Lake | 3–2 | D.C. United | Sandy, Utah |
| 7:00pm MDT | Baird 21', (yellow card) 89'; Rusnak 26'; Savarino 56' | Report | Arriola 9'; Mora (red card) 22'; Birnbaum 83'; DeLeon (yellow card) 92+2' | Stadium: Rio Tinto Stadium; Attendance: 16,961; Referee: Rubiel Vazquez |

| May 19, 2018 11 | Philadelphia Union | 4–1 | Real Salt Lake | Chester, Pennsylvania |
| 10:00am MDT | Epps 21'; Dockal 34'; Ilsinho 74'; Rosenberry 81' | | Kreilach 65'; Pablo Ruiz (yellow card) 87' | Stadium: Talen Energy Stadium; Attendance: 16,019; Referee: Hilario Grajeda |

| May 26, 2018 12 | Seattle Sounders FC | 0–1 | Real Salt Lake | Seattle, Washington |
| 2:00pm MDT | Eikrem (yellow card) 18'; Nouhou (yellow card) 37' | Report | Sunny (yellow card) 24'; Glad (yellow card) 42'; Beckerman (yellow card) 45'; Saucedo 61' | Stadium: CenturyLink Field; Attendance: 39,508; Referee: Baldomero Toledo |

| May 30, 2018 13 | Real Salt Lake | 2–1 | Houston Dynamo | Sandy, Utah |
| 7:30pm MDT | L. Silva 34'; Beckerman 82'; M. Silva (yellow card) 90+7' | Report | Martínez (yellow card) 28'; Alexander (yellow card) 70'; Elis 75'; Romell Quioto (yellow card) 90+6' | Stadium: Rio Tinto Stadium; Attendance: 16,613; Referee: David Gantar |

| June 2, 2018 14 | Real Salt Lake | 2–0 | Seattle Sounders FC | Sandy, Utah |
| 7:30pm MDT | Baird 57'; Glad (yellow card) 87'; L. Silva 91+' | Report | Leerdam (yellow card) 10'; Delem (yellow card) 25' | Stadium: Rio Tinto Stadium; Attendance: 18,556; Referee: Kevin Stott |

| June 9, 2018 15 | LA Galaxy | 3–0 | Real Salt Lake | Carson, California |
| 8:30pm MDT | Skjelvik (yellow card) 53'; Ibrahimovic 61', 67'; Kamara (yellow card) 69', (goal) 76' | Report | Lennon (yellow card) 63'; M. Silva (yellow card) 78' | Stadium: StubHub Center; Attendance: 25,462; Referee: Ted Unkel |

| June 23, 2018 16 | Real Salt Lake | 1–1 | San Jose Earthquakes | Sandy, Utah |
| 8:00pm MDT | Kreilach (yellow card) 12', (goal) 54' | Report | Hoesen 64' | Stadium: Rio Tinto Stadium; Attendance: 18,472; Referee: Silviu Petrescu |

| June 30, 2018 17 | Columbus Crew | 2–1 | Real Salt Lake | Columbus, Ohio |
| 5:30pm MDT | Zardes 6' (pen.); Sosa 23', (yellow card) 66' | Report | Sunny (yellow card) 47+'; Beckerman (yellow card) 56'; Rusnák 74'; Savarino (yellow card) 91+' | Stadium: MAPFRE Stadium; Attendance: 16,680; Referee: Drew Fischer |

| July 4, 2018 18 | Real Salt Lake | 4–2 | Sporting Kansas City | Sandy, Utah |
| 8:00pm MDT | Savarino 29'; Baird 37'; Saucedo (yellow card) 44', (goal) 46+'; Kreilach (yellow card) 77'; L. Silva 100+' (pen.) | Report | Sallói 20', (yellow card) 43' (red card) 90'; Amor (yellow card) 59'; Espinoza (yellow card) 60' (yellow-red card) 94+'; Opara 64', (yellow card) 66'; Fernandes (yellow card) 93+'; Sanchez (yellow card) 99+' | Stadium: Rio Tinto Stadium; Attendance: 19,206; Referee: Sorin Stoica |

| July 7, 2018 19 | Real Salt Lake | 2–0 | FC Dallas | Sandy, Utah |
| 8:00pm MDT | Rusnák 11' (pen.); L. Silva 91+' | Report | | Stadium: Rio Tinto Stadium; Attendance: 17,319; Referee: Armando Villarreal |

| July 14, 2018 20 | Minnesota United FC | 3–2 | Real Salt Lake | Minneapolis, Minnesota |
| 6:00pm MDT | Schuller (yellow card) 21'; Warner (yellow card) 47'; Ibson 51'; Quintero 62'; Ibarra 68' | Report | M. Silva (yellow card) 34'; Plata 77', 85' | Stadium: TCF Bank Stadium; Attendance: 23,667; Referee: Alan Kelly |

| July 21, 2018 21 (RMC) | Real Salt Lake | 2–2 | Colorado Rapids | Sandy, Utah |
| 8:00pm MDT | Kreilach 11'; Plata 17'; Baird (yellow card) 59'; Glad (yellow card) 73' | Report | Ford (yellow card) 9'; McBean (yellow card) 14', (goal) 33' (pen.); Serna 88' | Stadium: Rio Tinto Stadium; Attendance: 19,207; Referee: Baldomero Toledo |

| July 28, 2018 22 | San Jose Earthquakes | 0–0 | Real Salt Lake | San Jose, California |
| 8:30pm MDT | Shea Salinas (yellow card) 67'; Luis Felipe (yellow card) 72' | Report | M. Silva (yellow card) 43'; Glad (yellow card) 45+2'; Lennon (yellow card) 85' | Stadium: Avaya Stadium; Attendance: 16,351; Referee: Marcos de Oliveira |

| August 4, 2018 23 | Real Salt Lake | 2–1 | Chicago Fire | Sandy, Utah |
| 8:00pm MDT | Kreilach 48+', 75'; M. Silva (yellow card) 90' | Report | Schweinsteiger 48', (yellow card) 96+'; Conner (yellow card) 55' | Stadium: Rio Tinto Stadium; Attendance: 19,817; Referee: Kevin Stott |

| August 11, 2018 24 | Real Salt Lake | 1–1 | Montreal Impact | Sandy, Utah |
| 8:00pm MDT | Plata 26' (pen.); Baird (yellow card) 74' | Report | Raitala 55'; Lovitz (yellow card) 66' | Stadium: Rio Tinto Stadium; Attendance: 18,901; Referee: Chris Penso |

| August 15, 2018 25 | Los Angeles FC | 2–0 | Real Salt Lake | Los Angeles, California |
| 8:30pm MDT | Ramirez 13', 30'; Atuesta (yellow card) 33' | Report | Sunny (yellow card) 24'; Lennon (yellow card) 38'; Barry (yellow card) 43'; Beckerman (yellow card) 63'; Glad (yellow card) 84' | Stadium: Banc of California Stadium; Attendance: 22,000; Referee: David Gantar |

| August 18, 2018 26 | Houston Dynamo | 1–2 | Real Salt Lake | Houston, Texas |
| 7:00pm MDT | O. García 36' | Report | Ruiz (yellow card) 33'; Herrera (yellow card) 58'; Kreilach (yellow card) 82'; Sunny (yellow card) 87'; Savarino (yellow card) 90'; Rusnák 90+3', 90+10' (pen.) | Stadium: BBVA Compass Stadium; Attendance: Armando Villareal; Referee: 15,072 |

| August 25, 2018 27 (RMC) | Colorado Rapids | 0–6 | Real Salt Lake | Commerce City, Colorado |
| 7:00pm MDT | Jackson (red card) 9'; Boateng (yellow card) 19' (red card) 45' | Report | Kreilach 6'; Lennon (yellow card) 7'; Savarino 33', 58'; Herrera (yellow card) 51'; Plata 69'; Baird 74'; Rusnák 86' | Stadium: Dick's Sporting Goods Park; Attendance: 16,669; Referee: Ted Unkel |

| September 1, 2018 28 | Real Salt Lake | 6–2 | LA Galaxy | Sandy, Utah |
| 8:00pm MDT | Rusnák 14', 68'; Kreilach 45+', 61', 71'; Savarino 48' | Report | J. dos Santos 1'; Kitchen (yellow card) 35'; Alessandrini 63'; Feltscher (yellow card) 64' | Stadium: Rio Tinto Stadium; Attendance: 21,363; Referee: Drew Fischer |

| September 15, 2018 29 | Real Salt Lake | 1–1 | Minnesota United FC | Sandy, Utah |
| 7:30pm MDT | Kreilach 11'; Beckerman (yellow card) 64' | Report | Maximiniano (yellow card) 74'; Omsberg (yellow card) 76'; Ibarra 84' | Stadium: Rio Tinto Stadium; Attendance: 19,785; Referee: Chris Penso |

| September 22, 2018 30 | Atlanta United FC | 2–0 | Real Salt Lake | Atlanta, Georgia |
| 5:00pm MDT | Gressel 37'; Villalba 61' | | Sunny (yellow card) 43' | Stadium: Mercedes-Benz Stadium; Attendance: 72,017; Referee: Hilario Grajeda |

| September 30, 2018 31 | Sporting Kansas City | 1–1 | Real Salt Lake | Kansas City, Kansas |
| 3:00pm MDT | Baird 9' | Report | Opara 52'; Gutiérrez (yellow card) 74' | Stadium: Children's Mercy Park; Attendance: 19,844; Referee: Kevin Stott |

| October 6, 2018 32 | Real Salt Lake | 1–4 | Portland Timbers | Sandy, Utah |
| 7:30pm MDT | Savarino 55'; Beckerman (yellow card) 58'; Sunny (yellow card) 66' | Report | Chara (yellow card) 26'; Ebobisse 34'; Guzman (yellow card) 55'; Blanco 70', 73'; Melano 88'; Valeri (yellow card) 92+' | Stadium: Rio Tinto Stadium; Attendance: 20,034; Referee: Robert Sibiga |

| October 18, 2018 33 | Real Salt Lake | 4–1 | New England Revolution | Sandy, Utah |
| 7:30pm MDT | Besler 4'; Saucedo 14'; Baird 29'; Lennon (yellow card) 35'; Kreilach (yellow card) 41', (goal) 50' | Report | Fagundez (yellow card) 69'; Rowe 69' | Stadium: Rio Tinto Stadium; Attendance: 19,536; Referee: Jair Marrufo |

| October 21, 2018 34 | Portland Timbers | 3–0 | Real Salt Lake | Portland, Oregon |
| 10:00am MDT | Mabiala 15'; Valeri (yellow card) 63'; Chara 68'; Blanco (yellow card) 68', (goal) 87' | Report | Beckerman (yellow card) 27' | Stadium: Providence Park; Attendance: 21,144; Referee: Ismail Elfath |

=== MLS Cup Playoffs ===
| November 1, 2018 Knockout round | Los Angeles FC | 2–3 | Real Salt Lake | Los Angeles, California |
| 8:30pm MDT | Vela (yellow card) 26'; Silva 31'; Zimmerman (yellow card) 47'; Ramirez 54' | Report | Kreilach 21', 58'; Herrera (yellow card) 30'; Savarino (yellow card) 45+2'; Baird (yellow card) 54'; Zimmerman 69' (o.g.); Rusnák (yellow card) 75'; Sunny (yellow card) 86' | Stadium: Banc of California Stadium; Attendance: 22,000; Referee: Mark Geiger |

| November 4, 2018 Semifinal Leg 1 | Real Salt Lake | 1–1 | Sporting Kansas City | Sandy, Utah |
| 8:00pm MDT | Rusnák (yellow card) 26', (goal) 51'; Beckerman (yellow card) 72' | Report | Rubio 60', (yellow card) 76' | Stadium: Rio Tinto Stadium; Attendance: 14,045; Referee: Baldomero Toledo |

| November 11, 2018 Semifinal Leg 2 | Sporting Kansas City | 4–2 | Real Salt Lake | Kansas City, Kansas |
| 1:00 PM MST | Rubio 14' (yellow card) 63'; Sallói 19', 90+7'; Sánchez 67' (pen.); Espinoza (yellow card) 82' | Report | Herrera (yellow card) 49'; Saucedo 60'; Beckerman (yellow card) 64'; Kreilach 72' | Stadium: Children's Mercy Park; Attendance: 19,918; Referee: Jose Carlos Rivero |

Real Salt Lake eliminated on aggregate goals, 3–5

=== U.S. Open Cup ===
| June 6, 2018 4R | Real Salt Lake | 0–2 | Sporting Kansas City | Sandy, Utah |
| 8:00pm MDT | Hererra (yellow card) 28'; Ruiz (yellow card) 47' | Report | Russell 47'; Belmar 74' | Stadium: Rio Tinto Stadium; Attendance: 15,833; Referee: Malik Badawi |

== Stats ==
- Stats from MLS Regular season, MLS playoffs, CONCACAF Champions league, and U.S. Open Cup are all included.
- First tie-breaker for goals is assists; first for assists and shutouts is minutes played.

As of November 12, 2018

Goals
| Rank | Player | Nation | Goals | Assists |
|---|---|---|---|---|
| 1 | Damir Kreilach | (Croatia) | 15 | 9 |
| 2 | Albert Rusnák | (Slovakia) | 11 | 7 |
| 3 | Joao Plata | (Ecuador) | 8 | 10 |
| 3 | Corey Baird | (United States) | 8 | 5 |
| 5 | Jefferson Savarino | (Venezuela) | 7 | 11 |
| 6 | Luis Silva | (United States) | 5 | 0 |
| 7 | Sebastian Saucedo | (United States) | 4 | 5 |
| 8 | Kyle Beckerman | (United States) | 1 | 1 |
| 8 | Nick Besler | (United States) | 1 | 0 |

Assists
| Rank | Player | Nation | Assists | Minutes played |
|---|---|---|---|---|
| 1 | Jefferson Savarino | (Venezuela) | 11 | 3025 |
| 2 | Joao Plata | (Venezuela) | 10 | 1829 |
| 3 | Damir Kreilach | (Croatia) | 9 | 2964 |
| 4 | Albert Rusnák | (Slovakia) | 7 | 2682 |
| 4 | Brooks Lennon | (United States) | 6 | 3030 |
| 5 | Sebastian Saucedo | (United States) | 5 | 1112 |
| 5 | Corey Baird | (United States) | 5 | 1957 |
| 8 | Danilo Acosta | (United States) | 2 | 896 |
| 9 | Luke Mulholland | (United States) | 1 | 271 |
| 9 | Nedum Onuoha | (United States) | 1 | 362 |
| 9 | Sunny | (Nigeria) | 1 | 1434 |
| 9 | Kyle Beckerman | (United States) | 1 | 2801 |

Shutouts
| Rank | Player | Nation | Shutouts | Minutes played |
|---|---|---|---|---|
| 1 | Nick Rimando | (United States) | 7 | 3105 |

== Club ==
=== Roster ===
- Age calculated as of the start of the 2018 season.

As of September 15, 2018, Compliant with roster freeze date as per MLS rules.

| No. | Name | Nationality | Positions | Date of birth (age) | Signed from | Year with club (year signed) |
|---|---|---|---|---|---|---|
| 1 | Alex Horwath | United States | GK | March 27, 1987 (aged 30) | (Norway) SK Brann | 1 (2018) |
| 2 | Tony Beltran | United States | DF | October 11, 1987 (aged 30) | 2008 MLS SuperDraft | 11 (2008) |
| 3 | Adam Henley | Wales | DF | June 14, 1994 (aged 23) | (England) Blackburn Rovers F.C. | 1 (2018) |
| 4 | David Horst | United States | DF | October 25, 1985 (aged 32) | (United States) Houston Dynamo | 5 (2008–2010, 2017) |
| 5 | Kyle Beckerman (Captain) | United States | MF | April 23, 1982 (aged 35) | (United States) Colorado Rapids | 12 (2007) |
| 6 | Damir Kreilach | Croatia | MF | April 16, 1989 (aged 28) | (Germany) Union Berlin | 1 (2018) |
| 7 | Jefferson Savarino (DP) | Venezuela | MF | November 11, 1996 (aged 21) | (Venezuela) Zulia FC | 2 (2017) |
| 8 | Stephen Sunday | Nigeria | MF | September 17, 1988 (aged 29) | (Turkey) Alanyaspor | 3 (2016) |
| 10 | Joao Plata | Ecuador | FW | March 1, 1992 (aged 26) | (Canada) Toronto FC | 6 (2013) |
| 11 | Albert Rusnák(DP) | Slovakia | MF | July 7, 1994 (aged 23) | (Netherlands) FC Groningen | 2 (2017) |
| 12 | Brooks Lennon | United States | FW | September 22, 1997 (aged 20) | (England) Liverpool F.C. | 2 (2017) |
| 13 | Nick Besler | United States | MF | May 7, 1993 (aged 24) | (United States) Real Monarchs | 2 (2017) |
| 14 | Nedum Onuoha | England | DF | November 12, 1986 (aged 31) | (England) Queens Park Rangers F.C. | 1 (2018) |
| 15 | Justen Glad (HGP) | United States | DF | February 28, 1997 (aged 21) | (United States) Real Salt Lake Academy (HGP) | 5 (2014) |
| 17 | Demar Phillips | Jamaica | DF | September 23, 1983 (aged 34) | (Norway) Aalesunds FK | 4 (2015) |
| 18 | Nick Rimando | United States | GK | June 17, 1979 (aged 38) | (United States) D.C. United | 12 (2007) |
| 19 | Luke Mulholland | England | MF | August 7, 1988 (aged 29) | (United States) Tampa Bay Rowdies | 5 (2014) |
| 20 | Luis Silva | United States | MF | December 10, 1988 (aged 29) | (Mexico) Tigres UANL | 3 (2015, 2017) |
| 21 | Taylor Peay | United States | DF | September 5, 1991 (aged 26) | (United States) Real Monarchs | 1 (2018) |
| 22 | Aaron Herrera (HGP) | United States | DF | June 6, 1997 (aged 20) | (United States) Real Salt Lake Academy (HGP) | 1 (2018) |
| 23 | Sebastian Saucedo (HGP) | Mexico | FW | January 22, 1997 (aged 21) | (United States) Real Salt Lake Academy (HGP) | 5 (2014) |
| 24 | Connor Sparrow | United States | GK | May 10, 1994 (aged 23) | (United States) Real Monarchs | 2 (2017) |
| 25 | Danilo Acosta (HGP) | United States | DF | November 7, 1997 (aged 20) | (United States) Real Monarchs (HGP) | 3 (2016) |
| 26 | Shawn Barry | United States | DF | April 23, 1990 (aged 27) | (Poland) Korona Kielce | 1 (2018) |
| 27 | Corey Baird (HGP) | United States | FW | January 21, 1997 (aged 21) | (United States) Real Salt Lake Academy (HGP) | 1 (2018) |
| 28 | Ricky Lopez-Espin | United States | FW | December 2, 1995 (aged 22) | 2018 MLS SuperDraft | 1 (2018) |
| 29 | José Hernández (HGP) | Mexico | MF | April 12, 1996 (aged 21) | (United States) Real Salt Lake Academy (HGP) | 2 (2017) |
| 30 | Marcelo Silva | Uruguay | DF | March 21, 1989 (aged 28) | (Spain) Real Zaragoza | 2 (2017) |
| 31 | Pablo Ruiz | Argentina | MF | October 20, 1998 (aged 19) | (Chile) San Luis | 1 (2018) |
| 51 | Andrew Putna | United States | GK | October 21, 1994 (aged 23) | (United States) Real Monarchs | 1 (2018) |
| 70 | Jordan Allen | United States | FW | April 25, 1995 (aged 22) | (United States) Real Salt Lake Academy (HGP) | 5 (2014) |

=== Transfers ===
As of September 13, 2018

==== In ====
| Player | Position | Previous club | Fees/Notes | Date |
|---|---|---|---|---|
| (Venezuela) Jefferson Savarino | MF | (Venezuela) Zulia FC | RSL exercised buy option at end of loan Young DP | 11/02/17 |
| (United States) Aaron Herrera | DF | (United States) New Mexico Lobos | Homegrown Player | 12/15/17 |
| (United States) Taylor Peay | DF | (United States) Real Monarchs | Received right of first refusal from Portland Timbers, for third-round pick, 2018 MLS SuperDraft | 12/15/17 |
| (United States) Brooks Lennon | FW | (England) Liverpool | End of loan, terms undisclosed | 12/20/17 |
| (Spain) Alfredo Ortuño | FW | (Spain) Real Valladolid | Free Transfer | 01/03/18 |
| (United States) Corey Baird | FW | (United States) Stanford Cardinal | Homegrown Player | 01/05/18 |
| (Wales) Adam Henley | DF | (England) Blackburn Rovers | Free Transfer | 01/09/18 |
| (United States) Shawn Barry | DF | (Poland) Korona Kielce | Terms undisclosed | 01/17/18 |
| (Argentina) Pablo Ruíz | MF | (Chile) San Luis | Terms undisclosed | 02/02/18 |
| (Croatia) Damir Kreilach | MF | (Germany) Union Berlin | Terms undisclosed | 02/06/18 |
| (United States) Alex Horwath | GK | (Norway) SK Brann | Terms undisclosed | 02/11/18 |
| (United States) Andrew Putna | GK | (United States) Real Monarchs | Terms undisclosed | 07/13/18 |
| (Nigeria) Nedum Onuoha | DF | (England) Queens Park Rangers F.C. | Terms undisclosed | 08/13/18 |

==== Out ====
| Player | Position | Next Club | Fees/Notes | Date |
|---|---|---|---|---|
| (United States) Chad Barrett | FW | Retired | option declined, Free Agent | 11/27/17 |
| (United States) Reagan Dunk | DF | unattached | option declined | 11/27/17 |
| (Jamaica) Omar Holness | MF | (United States) Bethlehem Steel FC | option declined | 11/27/17 |
| (United States) Justin Schmidt | DF | (United States) Sacramento Republic FC | option declined | 11/27/17 |
| (United States) Chris Schuler | DF | (United States) Orlando City SC | option declined, Free Agent | 11/27/17 |
| (United States) Matt Van Oekel | GK | (United States) OKC Energy FC | option declined | 11/27/17 |
| (United States) Ricardo Velazco | FW | (El Salvador) A.D. Isidro Metapán | option declined | 11/27/17 |
| (United States) Chris Wingert | DF | (United States) New York Cosmos B | Retired from professional leagues | 02/19/18 |
| (Armenia) Yura Movsisyan | FW | (Sweden) Djurgårdens IF Fotboll | Waived, DP spot open, 6-month long loan | 03/02/18 |
| (Spain) Alfredo Ortuño | FW | (Spain) Albacete | Mutually agree part ways, DP spot open, | 07/23/18 |

Notes

1. Option Declined (OPT): Players who have had their option declined may still be resigned by the club under a new contract.
2. Free Agent (FREE): Players who are out of contract may still be resigned by the club under a new contract.

=== Loans ===
==== In ====
| Player | Position | Loaned from | Fees/Notes | Date |

==== Out ====
| Player | Position | Loaned to | Fees/Notes | Date |
|---|---|---|---|---|
| (Armenia) Yura Movsisyan | FW | (Sweden) Djurgårdens IF Fotboll | Waived, DP spot open, 6-month long loan | 03/02/18 |
| (Mexico) José Hernández | MF | (United States) Real Monarchs | Season long loan | 03/23/18 |

=== Trialist ===
| Player | Position | Previous team | Notes | Date | Result |
|---|---|---|---|---|---|
| (United States) Ricky Lopez-Espin | FW | Creighton | 2018 MLS SuperDraft pick #33. | 01/19/18 | Signed with RSL |

== See also ==
- Real Monarchs
