= 2016 Real Salt Lake season =

American soccer team season

Real Salt Lake
2016 season
- Owner: Dell Loy Hansen
- Coach: Jeff Cassar
- Stadium: Rio Tinto Stadium
- Major League Soccer: Conference: 6th Overall: 10th
- MLS Cup Playoffs: Knockout round
- U.S. Open Cup: Fifth round
- Rocky Mountain Cup: Winners
- Desert Diamond Cup: 7th
- Top goalscorer: League: Yura Movsisyan (6); All: Joao Plata (8)
- Highest home attendance: 20,389 (Jul 1 vs. D.C. United)
- Lowest home attendance: 18,036 (Jun 22 vs. New York Red Bulls)
- Average home league attendance: 19,759
- Biggest win: SKC 1-3 RSL (5/21)
- Biggest defeat: LA 5-2 RSL (4/23)
Home colors	Away colors

The 2016 Real Salt Lake season was the team's 12th year of existence and their twelfth consecutive season in Major League Soccer, the top division of the American soccer pyramid.

== Friendlies ==
=== Preseason ===
January 30, 2016 Scrimmage	Real Salt Lake	1–0	San Diego State Aztecs	Oceanside, California
1:00 p.m. MT	Morales 70'	Report		Stadium: SoCal Sports Complex

February 2, 2016 Scrimmage	Tijuana	1–0	Real Salt Lake	Tijuana, Baja California, Mexico
1:00 p.m. MT	Arriola 34'	Report		Stadium: Estadio Caliente

=== Desert Diamond Cup ===
February 18, 2016	Real Salt Lake	3–3	New England Revolution	Tucson, Arizona
	Morales (yellow card) 23', (goal) 54' (pen.); Maund (red card) 47'; Olave 68'; Garcia 77'	Report	Gamble 13'; Davies 48' (pen.), 84'; Woodberry (yellow card) 81' (yellow-red card) 83'	Stadium: Kino Sports Complex

February 20, 2016	Real Salt Lake	1–1	Columbus Crew	Tucson, Arizona
	Allen 17'	Report	Kamara 26'	Stadium: Kino Sports Complex

=== Friendly ===
July 19, 2016	Real Salt Lake	1-2	Internazionale	Sandy, Utah
8:00 p.m. MT	Allen 18'	Report	D'Ambrosio 33'; Jovetić 90'	Stadium: Rio Tinto Stadium; Attendance: 14,266

== Competitions ==
=== MLS regular season ===
==== Standings ====
===== Western Conference Table =====
Pos	Team	Pld	W	L	T	GF	GA	GD	Pts	Qualification
4	Seattle Sounders FC	34	14	14	6	44	43	+1	48	MLS Cup Knockout Round
5	Sporting Kansas City	34	13	13	8	42	41	+1	47	MLS Cup Knockout Round
6	Real Salt Lake	34	12	12	10	44	46	−2	46	MLS Cup Knockout Round
7	Portland Timbers	34	12	14	8	48	53	−5	44	
8	Vancouver Whitecaps FC	34	10	15	9	45	52	−7	39	

Source: MLS

===== Overall table =====
Pos	Team	Pld	W	L	T	GF	GA	GD	Pts	Qualification
7	Seattle Sounders FC (C)	34	14	14	6	44	43	+1	48	CONCACAF Champions League
8	Sporting Kansas City	34	13	13	8	42	41	+1	47	
9	Real Salt Lake	34	12	12	10	44	46	−2	46	
10	D.C. United	34	11	10	13	53	47	+6	46	
11	Montreal Impact	34	11	11	12	49	53	−4	45	

Source: MLS
Rules for classification: 1) points; 2) total wins; 3) total goal differential; 4) total goals scored;
(C) MLS Cup Champion

==== Results summary ====
Overall								Home						Away					
Pld	Pts	W	L	T	GF	GA	GD	W	L	T	GF	GA	GD	W	L	T	GF	GA	GD
34	46	12	12	10	44	46	−2	8	1	8	22	14	+8	4	11	2	22	32	−10

Last updated: October 24, 2016
Source: MLS Results
Pld = Matches played; Pts = Points; W = Matches won; T = Matches tied; L = Matches lost; GF = Goals for; GA = Goals against; GD = Goal difference

==== Match results ====
March 6, 2016 1	Orlando City SC	2–2	Real Salt Lake	Orlando, Florida
12:00 pm MDT	Ribeiro (yellow card) 32'; Cerén (red card) 45+'; Hines (yellow card) 76'; Larin 90+'; Winter 90+'	Report	Phillips (yellow card) 11' (yellow-red card) 20'; Plata 26' (pen.), 66'; Wingert (yellow card) 74'	Stadium: Orlando Citrus Bowl; Attendance: 60,147; Referee: Chris Penso

March 12, 2016 2	Real Salt Lake	2–1	Seattle Sounders FC	Sandy, Utah
2 pm MDT	Sunday 43'; Beckerman (yellow card) 73'; Olave 86'	Report	Friberg (yellow card) 13'; Alonso 35'; Scott (yellow card) 35'; Jones (yellow card) 38'; Dempsey (yellow card) 88'	Stadium: Rio Tinto Stadium; Attendance: 19,282; Referee: Juan Guzman

March 19, 2016 3	Portland Timbers	2–2	Real Salt Lake	Portland, Oregon
8:30 pm MDT	Adi (yellow card) 68', (goal) 79', 84' (pen.); Powell (yellow card) 76'	Report	Plata 16'; Beckerman (red card) 31'; Movsisyan 58'; Olave (red card) 83'; Sunday (yellow card) 87'; Martínez (yellow card) 90+'	Stadium: Providence Park; Attendance: 21,144; Referee: Hilario Grajeda

April 2, 2016 4	Sporting Kansas City	1–2	Real Salt Lake	Kansas City, Kansas
6:30 pm MDT	Feilhaber (yellow card) 90', (goal) 90+' (pen.)	Report	Glad 29'; Movsisyan (yellow card) 67'; Plata (yellow card) 77'; Mulholland 79', (yellow card) 90'	Stadium: Children's Mercy Park; Attendance: 20,553; Referee: Ted Unkel

April 9, 2016 5 (RMC)	Real Salt Lake	1–0	Colorado Rapids	Sandy, Utah
6:30 pm MDT	Plata 72'; Movsisyan (yellow card) 83'	Report	Burling (yellow card) 61'; Miller (yellow card) 90+'	Stadium: Rio Tinto Stadium; Attendance: 19,224; Referee: Drew Fischer

April 16, 2016 6	Real Salt Lake	1–0	Vancouver Whitecaps FC	Sandy, Utah
pm MDT	Martínez 55'; Beckerman (yellow card) 71'	Report	Waston (yellow card) 79'; Rivero (yellow card) 90+'	Stadium: Rio Tinto Stadium; Attendance: 19,720; Referee: Ismail Elfath

April 23, 2016 7	LA Galaxy	5–2	Real Salt Lake	Carson, California
7:30 pm MDT	Zardes 19', (yellow card) 38'; Magee 26'; Boateng 41' dos Santos 45'; Van Damme (yellow card) 67'; Gerrard 90+'	Report	Beckerman (yellow card) 13'; Martínez 16'; Beltran (yellow card) 57'; Olave (yellow card) 60'; Morales 70' (pen.)	Stadium: StubHub Center; Attendance: 25,867; Referee: Edvin Jurisevic

April 30, 2016 8	Real Salt Lake	2–1	Houston Dynamo	Sandy, Utah
6:30 pm MDT	Allen 62'; Movsisyan 70'	Report	Beasley (yellow card) 3'; Clark (yellow card) 24'; Miranda 54'	Stadium: Rio Tinto Stadium; Attendance: 19,950; Referee: Nima Saghafi

May 7, 2016 9 (RMC)	Colorado Rapids	1–0	Real Salt Lake	Commerce City, Colorado
pm MDT	Williams (yellow card) 15'; Jones 47', (yellow card) 53'; Gashi (yellow card) 81'; MacMath (yellow card) 90+'	Report	Sunday (yellow card) 29'; Beltran (yellow card) 79'	Stadium: Dick's Sporting Goods Park; Attendance: 14,638; Referee: Jair Marrufo

May 15, 2016 10	Houston Dynamo	1–0	Real Salt Lake	Houston, Texas
12 pm MDT	Alex (yellow card) 31'; Barnes 68'	Report	Beltran (yellow card) 81'	Stadium: BBVA Compass Stadium; Attendance: 17,943; Referee: Juan Guzman

May 21, 2016 11	Sporting Kansas City	1–3	Real Salt Lake	Kansas City, Kansas
6:30 pm MDT	Dwyer 50'; Espinoza (yellow card) 90+'	Report	Martínez 32'; Davis 45+' (o.g.); Movsisyan 53'; Sunday (yellow card) 79'	Stadium: Children's Mercy Park; Attendance: 20,618; Referee: Ricardo Salazar

May 28, 2016 12	Columbus Crew	4–3	Real Salt Lake	Columbus, Ohio
7:10 pm MDT	Kamara 17', 64', 74'; Glad 20' (o.g.); Saeid (yellow card) 81'	Report	Mulholland 13'; Maund (yellow card) 41'; Allen 78'; Plata 83'	Stadium: MAPFRE Stadium; Attendance: 14,894; Referee: David Gantar

June 2, 2016 13	New York City FC	2–3	Real Salt Lake	New York, New York
5 pm MDT	Pirlo (yellow card) 27'; Harrison 56'; Villa 87' (pk)	Report	Phillips (yellow card) 14'; Mulholland (yellow card) 17'; Wingert (yellow card) 51'; Movsisyan 59'; Martínez 67'; Brillant 74' (o.g.)	Stadium: Yankee Stadium; Attendance: 22,736; Referee: Ted Unkel

June 18, 2016 14	Real Salt Lake	2–2	Portland Timbers	Sandy, Utah
pm MDT	Martínez 17'; Beltran (yellow card) 56'; Glad (yellow card) 66'; Movsisyan 70' (pen.)	Report	Adi 29'; Chará (yellow card) 33'; Zemanski (yellow card) 33'; Melano 44'; Valentin (yellow card) 84'	Stadium: Rio Tinto Stadium; Attendance: 20,317; Referee: Allan Kelly

June 22, 2016 15	Real Salt Lake	2–1	New York Red Bulls	Sandy, Utah
7 pm MDT	Morales (yellow card) 45'; Movsisyan 65', (yellow card) 90+'; Allen 87'	Report	Sam (yellow card) 6'; Baah 7'; Collin (red card) 90'; Davis (yellow card) 90'	Stadium: Rio Tinto Stadium; Attendance: 18,036; Referee: Fotis Bazakos

June 25, 2016 16	FC Dallas	2–0	Real Salt Lake	Frisco, Texas
pm MDT	Acosta 18'; Hedges (yellow card) 49'; Díaz (yellow card) 51'; Castillo 58'	Report	Holness (yellow card) 81'	Stadium: Toyota Stadium; Attendance: 13,128; Referee: Drew Fischer

July 1, 2016 17	Real Salt Lake	1–1	D.C. United	Sandy, Utah
8:30 pm MDT	Beltran (yellow card) 19'; Beckerman (yellow card) 42'; Martínez 57'	Report	Kemp (yellow card) 3'; Boswell (yellow card) 81'; Jaffrey 90+'	Stadium: Rio Tinto Stadium; Attendance: 20,389; Referee: Juan Guzman

July 9, 2016 18	Real Salt Lake	1–1	Montreal Impact	Sandy, Utah
8 pm MDT	Wingert (yellow card) 62'; Glad (yellow card) 70'; Beckerman (yellow card) 76'; Movsisyan 79' (pk)	Report	Shipp 8'; Cabrera (yellow card) 16'	Stadium: Rio Tinto Stadium; Attendance: 20,086; Referee: Ricardo Salazar

July 13, 2016 19	Vancouver Whitecaps FC	2–0	Real Salt Lake	Vancouver, British Columbia
8:30 pm MDT	Jacobson (yellow card) 25'; Glad 34' (og); Techera 37'; Waston (yellow card) 54' de Jong (yellow card) 89'	Report	Allen (yellow card) 13'; Beltran (yellow card) 28'; Mulholland (yellow card) 59'; Garcia (yellow card) 74'	Stadium: BC Place; Attendance: 22,120; Referee: Jose Carlos Rivero

July 16, 2016 20	Real Salt Lake	0-0	New England Revolution	Sandy, Utah
8 pm MDT	Maund (yellow card) 34'	Report	Nguyen (yellow card) 44'; Woodberry (yellow card) 46'; Kamara (yellow card) 72'	Stadium: Rio Tinto Stadium; Attendance: 19,246; Referee: Ismail Elfath

July 22, 2016 21	Real Salt Lake	1-1	San Jose Earthquakes	Sandy, Utah
pm MDT	Beltran (yellow card) 30'; Mulholland 64'	Report	Wondolowski 9'	Stadium: Rio Tinto Stadium; Attendance: 19,842; Referee: Jair Marrufo

July 31, 2016 22	Philadelphia Union	1-2	Real Salt Lake	Chester, Pennsylvania
9 pm MDT	Fabinho (yellow card) 22'; Alberg 43' (pen.); Carroll (yellow card) 90'		Maund (yellow card) 42'; Plata 48'; Morales 54', (yellow card) 55'	Stadium: Talen Energy Stadium; Attendance: 18,091; Referee: Juan Guzman

August 3, 2016 23	Toronto FC	1-0	Real Salt Lake	Toronto, Ontario
pm MDT	Ricketts 48'		Maund (yellow card) 88'	Stadium: BMO Field; Attendance: 27,859; Referee: Alan Kelly

August 6, 2016 24	Real Salt Lake	3-1	Chicago Fire	Sandy, Utah
pm MDT	Garcia 14', (yellow card) 15'; Morales 28' (pen.), 64'	[ ]	LaBrocca (yellow card) 35'; Alvarez 58'	Stadium: Rio Tinto Stadium; Attendance: 19,909; Referee: Silviu Petrescuc

August 14, 2016 25	Seattle Sounders FC	2-1	Real Salt Lake	Seattle, Washington
5:00 pm MDT	Lodeiro 24'; Morris 37'		Plata 62'; Glad (yellow card) 94+'	Stadium: CenturyLink Field; Attendance: 39,491; Referee: Kevin Stott

August 20, 2016 26	Real Salt Lake	1-0	FC Dallas	Sandy, Utah
8:00 pm MDT	Beltran (yellow card) 43'; Mulholland (yellow card) 57'; Olave 78'; Plata (yellow card) 95+'		David (yellow card) 81'; Figueroa (yellow card) 84'	Stadium: Rio Tinto Stadium; Attendance: 19,939; Referee: Jose Carlos Rivero

August 26, 2016 27 (RMC)	Real Salt Lake	2-1	Colorado Rapids	Sandy, Utah
6:00 pm MDT	Movsisyan 39', 48'		Gashi 5'; Powers (yellow card) 60'; Burch (yellow card) 84'; Howard (yellow card) 91+'	Stadium: Rio Tinto Stadium; Attendance: 20,134; Referee: Jair Marrufo

September 7, 2016 28	Real Salt Lake	3-3	LA Galaxy	Sandy, Utah
7:30 pm MDT	Wingert (yellow card) 2'; Beckerman (yellow card) 17'; Olave (yellow card) 27'; Plata 53' (pen.), 67'; Mulholland (yellow card) 63'; Martínez 94+'		Boateng 6'; Larentowicz (yellow card) 2' dos Santosa 57', 64', (yellow card) 95+'	Stadium: Rio Tinto Stadium; Attendance: 20,266; Referee: Chris Penso

September 10, 2016 29	Portland Timbers	1-0	Real Salt Lake	Portland, Oregon
pm MDT	Adi 12'; Ridgewell (yellow card) 51'; Gleeson (yellow card) 86'		Sunny (yellow card) 40'; Morales (yellow card) 54'; Phillips (yellow card) 75'; Plata (yellow card) 90'	Stadium: Providence Park; Attendance: 21,144; Referee: Drew Fischer

September 17, 2016 30	Real Salt Lake	0-1	Houston Dynamo	Sandy, Utah
7:30pm MDT	Beltran (yellow card) 76'		Alex (yellow card) 33', (goal) 36'; Williams (yellow card) 54'; Maidana (yellow card) 69'; Willis (yellow card) 81'; Clark (yellow card) 85'; Alexander (yellow card) 93+'	Stadium: Rio Tinto Stadium; Attendance: 19,795; Referee: Silviu Petrescu

September 24, 2016 31	Real Salt Lake	0-0	FC Dallas	Sandy, Utah
7:30 pm MDT	Mulholland (yellow card) 39'		Acosta (yellow card) 85'; Seitz (yellow card) 91+'	Stadium: Rio Tinto Stadium; Attendance: 20,069; Referee: Allen Chapman

October 1, 2016 32	San Jose Earthquakes	2-1	Real Salt Lake	San Jose, California
8:30 pm MDT	Dawkins 40'; Alashe 40'		Glad 40'; Morales (yellow card) 72'	Stadium: Avaya Stadium; Attendance: 18,000; Referee: Kevin Stott

October 16, 2016 33	Real Salt Lake	0-0	Sporting Kansas City	Sandy, Utah
3:30 pm MDT	Mulholland (yellow card) 32'; Glad (yellow card) 58'			Stadium: Rio Tinto Stadium; Attendance: 19,705; Referee: Ismail Elfath

October 23, 2016 34	Seattle Sounders FC	2-1	Real Salt Lake	Seattle, Washington
2:00 pm MDT	Fernandez 3'; Roldan 31'; Marshall (yellow card) 37'; Friberg (yellow card) 40'		Mulholland 4'; Plata (yellow card) 8'; Beckerman (yellow card) 48'; Wingert (yellow card) 78'	Stadium: CenturyLink Field; Attendance: 50,022; Referee: Baldomero Toledo

=== MLS Cup Playoffs ===
==== Western Conference Knockout Round ====
October 26 Knockout	LA Galaxy	3–1	Real Salt Lake	Carson, California
7:30 PM PDT	Gordon 14'; Boateng 26', 34'; Hušidić (yellow card) 62'	Report	Plata 21' (pen.); Phillips (yellow card) 39'; Wingert (yellow card) 41'; Sunny (yellow card) 71'	Stadium: StubHub Center; Attendance: 18,124; Referee: Alan Kelly

=== U.S. Open Cup ===
Real Salt Lake entered the 2016 U.S. Open Cup with the rest of Major League Soccer in the fourth round.

June 14, 2016 4R	Real Salt Lake	2–2 (a.e.t.) (3–1 p)	Wilmington Hammerheads FC	Sandy, Utah
7 PM MDT	Mulholland (yellow card) 29'; Plata 65'; Martínez 86'; Maund (yellow card) 120'	Report	Corboz (yellow card) 30', (goal) 34'; Michaud 58'; Fairclough (yellow card) 63'; Doue (yellow card) 90+'; Parratt (yellow card) 102'	Stadium: Rio Tinto Stadium; Attendance: 17,131
	Penalties
	Martínez (penalty scored); Plata (penalty scored); Morales (penalty missed); Wingert (penalty scored)		Perone (penalty missed); Corboz (penalty scored); Barnes-Homer (penalty missed); Miller (penalty missed)

June 28, 2016 Rd. of 16	Real Salt Lake	1–1 (a.e.t.) (1–4 p)	Seattle Sounders FC	Sandy, Utah
8 PM MDT	Plata 43' (pen.); Phillips (yellow card) 93'; Morales (yellow card) 93'	RSL Report	Gomez (yellow card) 29'; Valdez 51'; Friberg (yellow card) 93'	Stadium: Rio Tinto Stadium; Attendance: 17,087; Referee: Alex Chilowicz
	Penalties
	Martínez (penalty scored); Plata (penalty missed); Beckerman (penalty missed)		Gomez (penalty scored); Morris (penalty scored); Scott (penalty scored); Friberg (penalty scored)

=== CONCACAF Champions League ===
Real Salt Lake will continue the 2015–16 CONCACAF Champions League in the knockout stage with all remaining competitors. Having earned a 3rd-place position in the knockout stage Real Salt Lake will host the second leg of the quarterfinals

February 24, 2016 QF	UANL (Mexico)	2–0	(United States) Real Salt Lake	San Nicolás de los Garza, Mexico
6 PM MDT	Nilo (yellow card) 37'; Rivas 67'; Damm 86'; Sóbis (yellow card) 88'; Duenas (yellow card) 90+4'	Report	Olave (yellow card) 13'	Stadium: Estadio Universitario

March 2, 2016 QF	Real Salt Lake (United States)	1–1	(Mexico) UANL	Sandy, Utah
8 PM MDT	Plata 22'; Beltran (yellow card) 25'; Morales (yellow card) 74'	Report	Gignac (yellow card) 10', (goal) 90+'; Jiménez (yellow card) 43'	Stadium: Rio Tinto Stadium; Attendance: 20,921

== Statistics ==
- Stats from MLS Regular season, MLS playoffs, CONCACAF Champions league, and U.S. Open Cup are all included.

As of October 27, 2016

Goals
Rank	Player	Nation	Goals
1	Joao Plata	(Ecuador)	13
2	Yura Movsisyan	(Armenia)	9
3	Juan Manuel Martínez	(Argentina)	8
4	Javier Morales	(Argentina)	4
4	Luke Mulholland	(England)	4
5	Jordan Allen	(United States)	3
7	Justen Glad	(United States)	2
7	Jámison Olave	(Colombia)	2
8	Olmes Garcia	(Colombia)	1
8	Stephen Sunday	(Nigeria)	1

Assists
Rank	Player	Nation	Assists
1	Joao Plata	(Ecuador)	11
2	Demar Phillips	(Jamaica)	5
3	Javier Morales	(Argentina)	4
3	Yura Movsisyan	(Armenia)	4
4	Tony Beltran	(United States)	3
4	Luke Mulholland	(England)	3
6	Jordan Allen	(United States)	2
6	Juan Manuel Martínez	(Argentina)	2
8	Kyle Beckerman	(United States)	1
8	Olmes García	(Colombia)	1
8	Justen Glad	(United States)	1
8	Stephen Sunday	(Nigeria)	1
8	John Stertzer	(United States)	1

Shutouts
Rank	Player	Nation	Shutouts
1	Nick Rimando	(United States)	6

== Club ==
=== Roster ===
- Age calculated as of the start of the 2016 season.

As of August 6, 2016

No.	Position	Player	Nation	Age
1	GK	Lalo Fernández (HGP)	Mexico	23
2	DF	Tony Beltran	United States	28
3	DF	Phanuel Kavita (HGP)	Democratic Republic of the Congo	22
4	DF	Jámison Olave	Colombia	34
5	MF	Kyle Beckerman (Captain)	United States	33
6	DF	Boyd Okwuonu	United States	23
7	FW	Juan Manuel Martínez (DP)	Argentina	30
8	MF	Stephen Sunday	Nigeria	27
10	FW	Joao Plata (DP)	Ecuador	24
11	MF	Javier Morales	Argentina	36
12	MF	Omar Holness (GA)	Jamaica	21
14	FW	Yura Movsisyan (DP; loan from Spartak Moscow)	Armenia	28
15	DF	Justen Glad (HGP)	United States	19
16	DF	Chris Wingert	United States	33
17	DF	Demar Phillips	Jamaica	32
18	GK	Nick Rimando	United States	36
19	MF	Luke Mulholland	England	27
20	FW	Ricardo Velazco (HGP)	United States	22
21	DF	Aaron Maund	United States	25
24	GK	Jeff Attinella	United States	27
25	DF	Danilo Acosta (HGP)	Honduras	18
27	MF	John Stertzer	United States	25
28	DF	Chris Schuler	United States	28
29	FW	Pedro Báez (loan from Cerro Porteño)	Paraguay	19
30	FW	Emery Welshman	Guyana	24
49	FW	Devon Sandoval	United States	24
70	MF	Jordan Allen	United States	20
80	FW	Olmes García	Colombia	23

=== Transfers ===
As of March 6, 2016.

==== In ====
Position	Player	Previous club	Fees/Notes	Date
MF	(Honduras) Danilo Acosta	(United States) Real Salt Lake-Arizona Academy	HGP	12/29/15
MF	(Jamaica) Omar Holness	(United States) North Carolina Tar Heels	2016 MLS SuperDraft	12/29/15
MF	(Nigeria) Stephen Sunday	(Turkey) Alanyaspor		1/21/16
FW	(Guyana) Emery Welshman	(United States) Real Monarchs		1/22/16
DF	(United States) Chris Wingert	(United States) New York City FC		2/3/16
DF	(United States) Chris Schuler	(United States) Real Monarchs		8/11/16

==== Out ====
Position	Player	Next Club	Fees/Notes	Date
DF	(Guatemala) Elías Vásquez	unattached	option declined	11/30/15
MF	(Brazil) Pecka	(United States) Rayo OKC	option declined	11/30/15
DF	(United States) Chris Schuler	(United States) Real Monarchs	out of contract	11/30/15
MF	(United States) Luis Gil	(Mexico) Querétaro	out of contract	11/30/15
MF	(United States) Luis Silva	(Mexico) Tigres UANL	out of contract	11/30/15
FW	(Argentina) Sebastián Jaime	(Chile) Universidad Católica	contract terminated	1/21/16
DF	(The Gambia) Abdoulie Mansally	(United States) Houston Dynamo	trade	2/18/16
MF	(Chile) Adolfo Ovalle	unattached	contract terminated	4/28/16

=== Loans ===
==== In ====
Position	Player	Loaned from	Fees/Notes	Date
FW	(Armenia) Yura Movsisyan	(Russia) Spartak Moscow	one-year loan; DP	1/15/16
MF	(United States) Andrew Brody	(United States) Real Monarchs	4-day loan (extreme hardship)	4/1/16
DF	(United States) Emilio Orozco	(United States) Real Monarchs	4-day loan (extreme hardship)	4/1/16
FW	(Paraguay) Pedro Báez	(Paraguay) Cerro Porteño	end of season; option to buy	7/22/16

==== Out ====
Position	Player	Loaned to	Fees/Notes	Date
MF	(Mexico) Sebastian Saucedo	(Mexico) Veracruz	one-year loan; HGP	1/12/16
FW	(United States) Devon Sandoval	(United States) Rayo OKC	Rest of the 2016 season	7/13/16
