= Danilo Acosta =

Honduran footballer (born 1997)

Personal information
- Full name: Danilo Israel Acosta Martínez
- Date of birth: 17 November 1997 (age 28)
- Place of birth: San Pedro Sula, Honduras
- Height: 1.80 m (5 ft 11 in)
- Position: Defender

Youth career
- 2013–2015: Real Salt Lake AZ

Senior career*
Years	Team	Apps	(Gls)
2015–2018	Real Monarchs	26	(0)
2016–2019	Real Salt Lake	29	(0)
2019	→ Orlando City (loan)	8	(0)
2020–2021	LA Galaxy	2	(0)
2021	LA Galaxy II	7	(0)
2022	Orange County SC	5	(0)

International career^{‡}
2016–2017	United States U20	16	(1)
2021	Honduras	2	(0)
Medal record
Representing United States
Winner	CONCACAF U-20 Championship	2017
- * Club domestic league appearances and goals as of 14:36, 23 October 2022 (UTC) ‡ National team caps and goals as of 01:38, 6 September 2021 (UTC)

Danilo "Danny" Israel Acosta Martínez (born 17 November 1997) is a Honduran former professional footballer.

== Club career ==
After spending time with Real Salt Lake's academy in Arizona, and United Soccer League affiliate, Real Monarchs, Acosta signed a Homegrown Player contract with the club on 29 December 2015.

On 28 December 2018, Acosta joined Orlando City SC on a season-long loan with an option to make the transfer permanent at the end of the season, in exchange for $75,000 of General Allocation Money. Orlando declined to make the transfer permanent. Acosta's contract option with Real Salt Lake was also declined, leaving him as a free agent at the end of the 2019 season.

On 25 November 2019, the LA Galaxy selected Acosta for the end of year Waiver Draft. He officially signed for the club on 8 January 2020. On 15 February Acosta tore his ACL and missed out on the entire 2020 season. Following the 2021 season, Acosta was released by the Galaxy.

On 7 January 2022, Acosta signed with USL Championship side Orange County SC ahead of their 2022 season.

== International career ==
Acosta was selected in the United States U18 36-player training camp in October 2014, but has yet to represent the United States. On 3 January 2016, Acosta was named in Tab Ramos' United States U20 January training camp.

Acosta won the 2017 CONCACAF U-20 Championship with the United States, and represented the United States at the 2017 FIFA U-20 World Cup in South Korea.

He received his first and so far only call up to the U.S. senior national team camp in January 2018.

With no senior caps to his name, Acosta remained eligible for his country of birth and was selected to represent Honduras at the 2019 Gold Cup. Having failed to make an appearance for the team, Acosta declined to sign a letter of intent from FIFA confirming his one-time switch of allegiance to Honduras following their elimination from the competition.

On 16 June 2021, the Football Federation of Honduras declared that Acosta had decided to, permanently, represent Honduras at the international level and that FIFA had, already, approved his petition. He debuted with Honduras in a 0–0 2022 FIFA World Cup qualification tie with El Salvador on 5 September 2021.

== Club statistics ==
As of 18 July 2019

Club	Season	Division	Domestic league		Domestic cup		Playoffs		Continental		Total	
Club	Season	Division	Apps	Goals	Apps	Goals	Apps	Goals	Apps	Goals	Apps	Goals
Real Monarchs	2015	USL	3	0	2	0	0	0	0	0	5	0
Real Salt Lake	2016	MLS	0	0	0	0	0	0	0	0	0	0
Real Salt Lake	2017	MLS	17	0	0	0	0	0	0	0	17	0
Real Salt Lake	2018	MLS	12	0	0	0	0	0	0	0	12	0
Real Salt Lake	Total		29	0	0	0	0	0	0	0	29	0
Real Monarchs (loan)	2016	USL	18	0	0	0	0	0	0	0	18	0
Real Monarchs (loan)	2018	USL	5	0	0	0	0	0	0	0	5	0
Real Monarchs (loan)	Total		23	0	0	0	0	0	0	0	23	0
Orlando City (loan)	2019	MLS	8	0	0	0	0	0	0	0	8	0
LA Galaxy	2020	MLS	0	0	0	0	0	0	0	0	0	0
Career Total			63	0	2	0	0	0	0	0	65	0

== Honors ==
United States U20

- CONCACAF Under-20 Championship: 2017
