= Albert Rusnák (footballer, born 1994) =

Slovak footballer (born 1994)

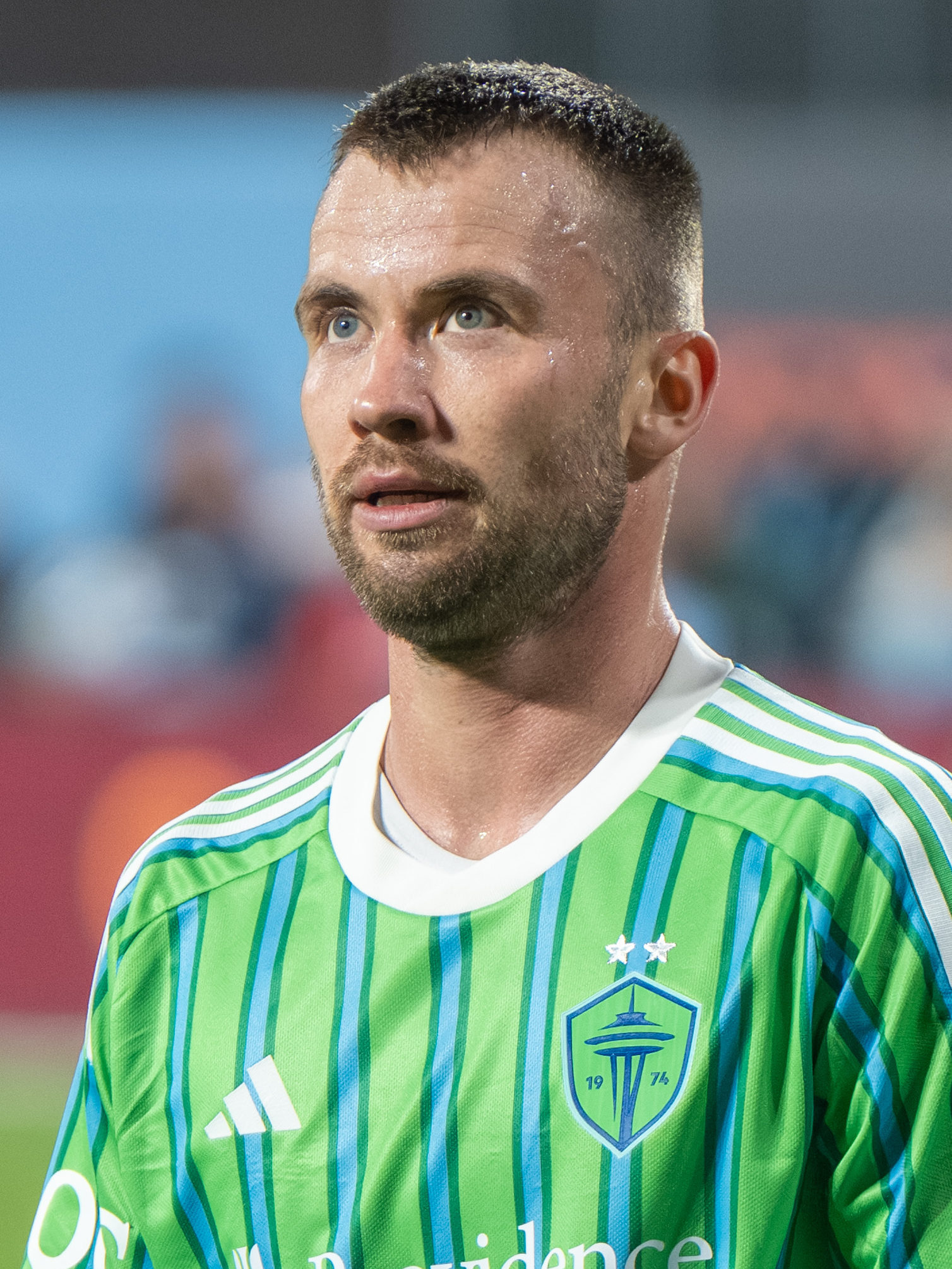
- Rusnák with the Seattle Sounders in 2025

Personal information
- Full name: Albert Rusnák
- Date of birth: 7 July 1994 (age 32)
- Place of birth: Vyškov, Czech Republic
- Height: 1.75 m (5 ft 9 in)
- Position: Attacking midfielder

Team information
- Current team: Seattle Sounders FC
- Number: 11

Youth career
- KAC Košice
- 1997–2010: Košice
- 2010–2013: Manchester City

Senior career*
Years	Team	Apps	(Gls)
2013–2015	Manchester City	0	(0)
2013	→ Oldham Athletic (loan)	3	(0)
2014	→ Birmingham City (loan)	4	(0)
2014	→ Cambuur (loan)	17	(4)
2015–2017	Groningen	71	(10)
2017–2021	Real Salt Lake	140	(41)
2022–	Seattle Sounders FC	101	(19)

International career^{‡}
2011	Slovakia U17	6	(2)
2011–2013	Slovakia U19	6	(2)
2013–2017	Slovakia U21	12	(3)
2016–	Slovakia	38	(7)
- * Club domestic league appearances and goals as of 21:12, 25 March 2025 (UTC) ‡ National team caps and goals as of 14:14, 15 November 2026 (UTC)

Albert Rusnák (born 7 July 1994) is a Slovak professional footballer who plays as an attacking midfielder and central midfielder for Major League Soccer club Seattle Sounders FC. Born in the Czech Republic, he has played for the Slovakia national team.

== Club career ==
=== Manchester City ===
Rusnák played youth football in Slovakia for MFK Košice from a very young age, before signing for Manchester City in July 2010, where he joined the club's reserve side.

==== Loan to Oldham Athletic ====
After three years of youth and reserve-team football, he signed for Football League One side Oldham Athletic on loan. Rusnák made his first senior appearance as a 63rd-minute substitute for Jonson Clarke-Harris in a league game against Tranmere Rovers on 31 August 2013, in a match that they lost 0–1 at Boundary Park. His first start came three days later, in a 4–1 away Football League Trophy win over Shrewsbury Town. On 17 September, Rusnák's loan was cut short and he returned to City after Rusnak reported refused to play in a reserve team match against Port Vale.

==== Loan to Birmingham City ====
On 21 January 2014, Rusnák joined Football League Championship (second-tier) club Birmingham City on a month's youth loan. He went straight into the starting eleven for the FA Cup fourth round defeat to Swansea City the following Saturday. On 18 February 2014, Rusnák extended his loan spell until the conclusion of the 2013–14 season.

==== Loan to SC Cambuur ====
On 25 July 2014, Rusnák moved to Dutch Eredivisie club SC Cambuur on loan until January. He became a key part of the team, scoring in a 3–0 win over local rivals FC Groningen and having his loan extended until the end of the season. Earlier in the season, in another local derby at SC Heerenveen, he gave the ball away from kick-off, resulting in a penalty being awarded after nine seconds, but Cambuur fought back for a 2–2 draw.

=== FC Groningen ===
With his Manchester City contract due to expire in the summer of 2015, Rusnák moved on a three-year contract to Groningen on 18 December 2014. On 3 May 2015, he scored both goals in the KNVB Cup final as they defeated reigning champions PEC Zwolle to win their first major trophy and qualify for the UEFA Europa League.

=== Real Salt Lake ===
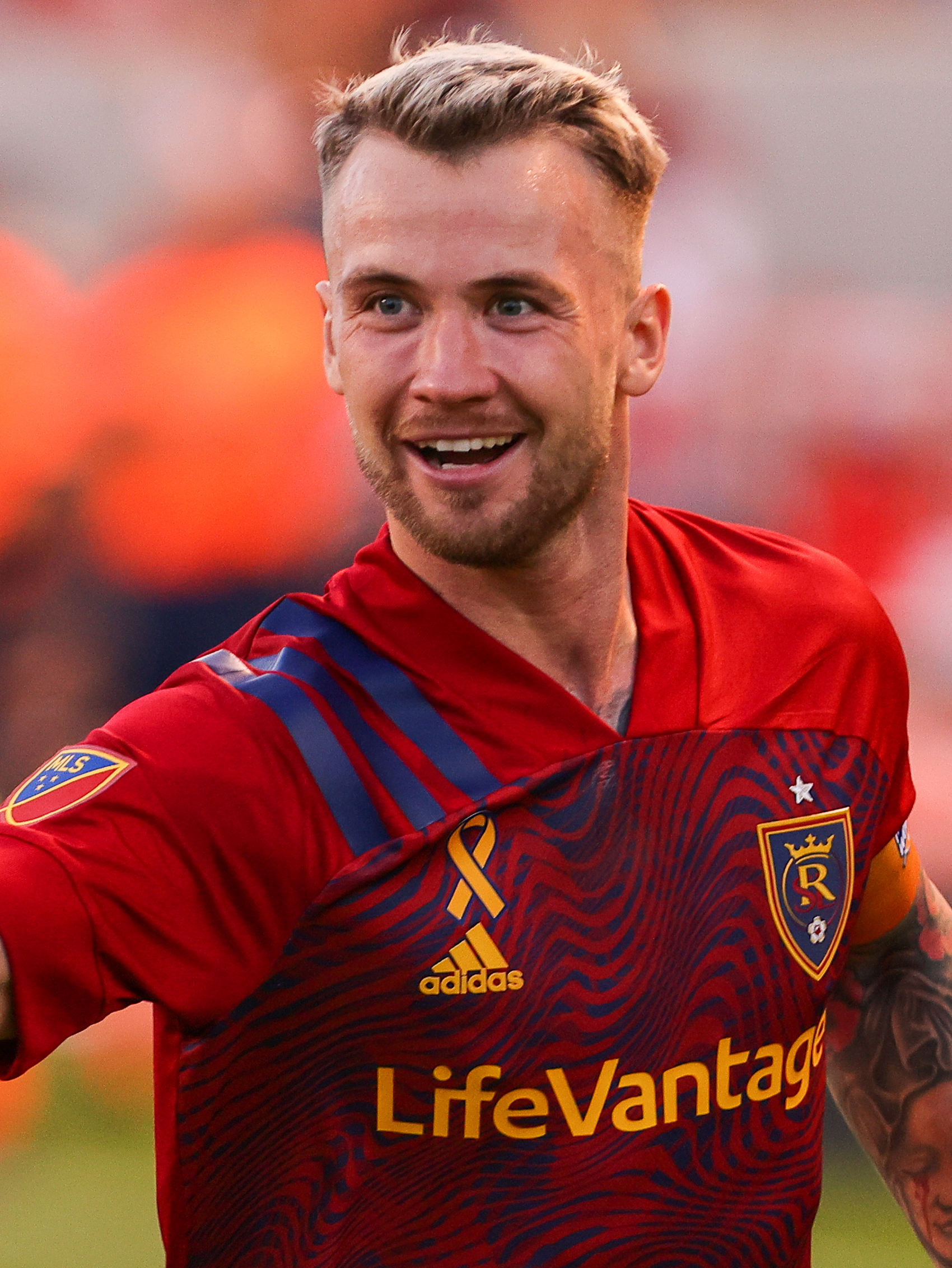
Rusnák with Real Salt Lake in 2021.

On 6 January 2017, Rusnák joined Real Salt Lake of Major League Soccer in time for the 2017 season. The terms of the move were undisclosed. He wore the number 11 shirt last worn by Javier Morales. He finished his debut MLS season with 14 assists, good for fourth-best in the league. Rusnák then hit the 10-goal mark in both his second and third seasons with RSL.

Rusnák's contract with Salt Lake expired following the 2021 season, and he officially announced he would not return to the club on 8 January 2022.

=== Seattle Sounders FC ===
On 13 January 2022, Rusnák signed with Seattle Sounders FC as the club's third Designated Player. He helped the team win the 2022 CONCACAF Champions League, scoring in the first leg of the semifinals against New York City FC. Rusnák played mainly as a central midfielder in tandem with various partners due to injuries to Obed Vargas and João Paulo. The Sounders ended the season by missing the MLS Cup Playoffs—a first in franchise history.

On 10 November 2023, playing his more natural attacking midfielder role in the MLS Cup Playoffs, Rusnak scored the only goal in 1-0 home win in game 3 of Round One against FC Dallas. The goal was his second in the best-of-three series.

Rusnák recorded his first MLS hat-trick on 7 September 2024, against Columbus Crew; who played with an outfield player in goal for the second half. He scored in the stoppage time of the first half after the switch and added two goals in the second half of the 4–0 win.

== International career ==
Being able to represent the Czech Republic due to being born there, nonetheless Rusnák made his debut for Slovakia on 15 November 2016, a goalless draw in a friendly match against Austria in Vienna, playing as a substitute from the 46th minute.

In 2017, he kept receiving invitations to all fixtures, except for matches against Uganda and Sweden in Abu Dhabi, where league players were selected. In that year he made appearances in five of six qualifying matches for the 2018 FIFA World Cup, assisting Ondrej Duda's goal in the last match in the group stage against Malta, which Slovakia won 3–0.

Rusnák scored his first international goal in his ninth cap, with a right-foot shot, in the 42nd minute of the first international match of 2018, a semi-final fixture against UAE, at the 2018 King's Cup. He was assisted by a pass from Patrik Hrošovský.

== Personal life ==
Rusnák's father, also called Albert Rusnák, is himself a former professional footballer and manager who became a scout at Manchester City in 2010, taking his son to the club.

== Style of play ==
Rusnák struggled while playing in the Football League, due to the style of play rewarding taller and physically stronger players. His manager at Cambuur, Henk de Jong, noted how his style of play being better suited for a playmaker role rather than his position on the wing in England.

== Career statistics ==
=== Club ===
As of match played 30 March 2025

Appearances and goals by club, season and competition
Club	Season	League			National cup (Note: Includes FA Cup, KNVB Cup, U.S. Open Cup)		Continental		Other		Total	
Club	Season	Division	Apps	Goals	Apps	Goals	Apps	Goals	Apps	Goals	Apps	Goals
Manchester City	2013–14	Premier League	0	0	0	0	0	0	0	0	0	0
Oldham Athletic (loan)	2013–14	League One	2	0	0	0	0	0	1 (Note: Appearance in Football League Trophy)	0	3	0
Birmingham City (loan)	2013–14	Championship	3	0	1	0	0	0	0	0	4	0
SC Cambuur (loan)	2014–15	Eredivisie	17	4	0	0	—		—		17	4
Groningen	2014–15	Eredivisie	16	3	3	3	—		—		19	6
Groningen	2015–16	Eredivisie	28	3	2	0	6 (Note: Appearances in UEFA Europa League)	0	1 (Note: Appearance in Johan Cruyff Shield)	0	37	3
Groningen	2016–17	Eredivisie	13	1	2	0	—		—		15	1
Groningen	Total		57	7	7	3	6	0	1	0	71	10
Real Salt Lake	2017	Major League Soccer	30	7	0	0	—		—		30	7
Real Salt Lake	2018	Major League Soccer	31	10	0	0	—		2 (Note: Appearance(s) in MLS Cup Playoffs)	1	33	11
Real Salt Lake	2019	Major League Soccer	29	10	0	0	—		1	0	30	10
Real Salt Lake	2020	Major League Soccer	16 (Note: Includes two appearances in MLS is Back Tournament group stage)	3	—		—		1 (Note: Appearance in MLS is Back Tournament knockout stage)	0	17	3
Real Salt Lake	2021	Major League Soccer	34	11	—		—		2	0	31	10
Real Salt Lake	Total		140	41	0	0	—		6	1	146	42
Seattle Sounders FC	2022	Major League Soccer	32	3	0	0	8 (Note: Appearances in the CONCACAF Champions Cup)	1	—		40	4
Seattle Sounders FC	2023	Major League Soccer	32	5	0	0	—		7 (Note: Four appearances and two goals in MLS Cup Playoffs, two appearances in Leagues Cup, one appearance in FIFA Club World Cup)	2	38	7
Seattle Sounders FC	2024	Major League Soccer	32	10	2	0	—		8 (Note: Three appearances in MLS Cup Playoffs, five appearances and one goal in Leagues Cup)	1	42	11
Seattle Sounders FC	2025	Major League Soccer	6	2	—		3	1	0	0	9	3
Seattle Sounders FC	Total		102	20	2	0	11	2	15	3	130	25
Career total			299	68	10	3	17	2	22	4	347	77

=== International ===
Scores and results list Slovakia's goal tally first, score column indicates score after each Rusnák goal.

List of international goals scored by Albert Rusnák
No.	Date	Venue	Opponent	Score	Result	Competition
1	22 March 2018	Rajamangala National Stadium, Bangkok, Thailand	United Arab Emirates	1–0	2–1	2018 King's Cup
2	5 September 2018	Štadión Antona Malatinského, Trnava, Slovakia	Denmark	2–0	3–0	Friendly
3	16 October 2018	Friends Arena, Solna, Sweden	Sweden	1–1	1–1	Friendly
4	16 November 2018	Štadión Antona Malatinského, Trnava, Slovakia	Ukraine	1–0	4–1	2018–19 UEFA Nations League B
5	21 March 2019	Štadión Antona Malatinského, Trnava, Slovakia	Hungary	2–0	2–0	UEFA Euro 2020 qualification
6	14 November 2021	National Stadium, Ta' Qali, Malta	Malta	1–0	6–0	2022 FIFA World Cup qualification
7	14 November 2021	National Stadium, Ta' Qali, Malta	Malta	3–0	6–0	2022 FIFA World Cup qualification

== Honours ==
FC Groningen

- KNVB Cup: 2014–15

Seattle Sounders FC

- CONCACAF Champions League: 2022
- Leagues Cup: 2025

Slovakia

- King's Cup: 2018
