= Jordan Allen =

American soccer player (born 1995)

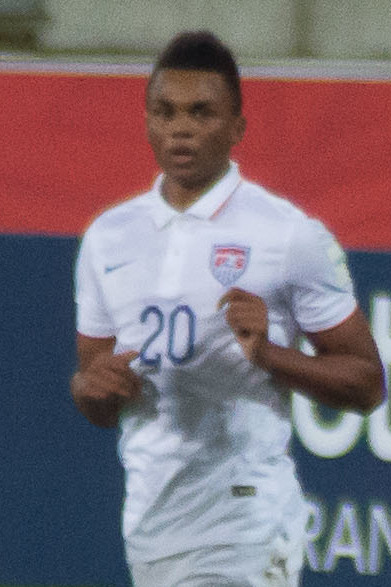

Personal information
- Full name: Jordan Evans Allen
- Date of birth: April 25, 1995 (age 31)
- Place of birth: Rochester, New York, U.S.
- Height: 1.80 m (5 ft 11 in)
- Position: Midfielder

Youth career
- 2003–2006: Churchville Admirals (NY)
- 2011: IMG Soccer Academy
- 2011–2012: Real Salt Lake AZ
- 2013: Virginia Cavaliers

Senior career*
Years	Team	Apps	(Gls)
2014–2019	Real Salt Lake	50	(4)
2017–2019	→ Real Monarchs (loan)	1	(0)

International career^{‡}
2011	United States U17	3	(0)
2012–2013	United States U18	6	(0)
2015	United States U20	5	(0)
- * Club domestic league appearances and goals as of November 4, 2018 ‡ National team caps and goals as of April 22, 2015

Jordan Evans Allen (born April 25, 1995) is an American former professional soccer player who played as a midfielder for Real Salt Lake.

== Career ==
=== Early career ===
Born in Rochester, New York, Allen played for the Real Salt Lake Arizona Academy from 2011 to 2012 before playing a season at the University of Virginia in 2013.

=== Real Salt Lake ===
On December 31, 2013, it was announced that Allen had signed a homegrown contract with Real Salt Lake of Major League Soccer. He made his professional debut on March 8, 2014, against the LA Galaxy, in which he came on in the 90th minute for Joao Plata as Salt Lake won 1–0. On March 29, 2015, after coming on as a substitute in a match against Toronto FC, he scored his first professional goal in the 90th minute, just moments after Toronto had tied the game in a 2–1 win.

After playing over 40 games in his first two full seasons, Allen's progress has been hampered by injury, only playing two matches since the end of the 2016 season.

Allen retired from playing professional soccer at the end of the 2019 season due to injury problems.

== Career statistics ==
As of May 24, 2019

Club	Season	League			MLS Cup		U.S. Open Cup		CONCACAF		Total	
Club	Season	Division	Apps	Goals	Apps	Goals	Apps	Goals	Apps	Goals	Apps	Goals
Real Salt Lake	2014	MLS	2	0	—	—	0	0	0	0	2	0
Real Salt Lake	2015	MLS	23	1	—	—	1	0	0	0	24	1
Real Salt Lake	2016	MLS	23	4	1	0	2	0	3	0	29	4
Real Salt Lake	2017	MLS	2	0	0	0	0	0	0	0	2	0
Real Salt Lake	2018	MLS	0	0	0	0	0	0	0	0	0	0
Real Salt Lake	2019	MLS	0	0	0	0	0	0	0	0	0	0
Real Salt Lake	Career total		50	5	1	0	3	0	3	0	57	5
