= Reagan Dunk =

American soccer player

Personal information
- Date of birth: February 8, 1994 (age 32)
- Place of birth: Dallas, Texas, United States
- Height: 5 ft 11 in (1.80 m)
- Position: Defender

College career
Years	Team	Apps	(Gls)
2012–2016	Denver Pioneers	79	(2)

Senior career*
Years	Team	Apps	(Gls)
2017	Real Salt Lake	3	(0)
2017	→ Real Monarchs (loan)	9	(0)
- * Club domestic league appearances and goals as of 12:03, 21 October 2017 (UTC)

Reagan Dunk (born February 8, 1994) is an American soccer player.

== Career ==
=== College and amateur ===
Dunk was an all-American college soccer at the University of Denver between 2012 and 2016, but sat out 2012 as a redshirt.

=== Professional ===
Dunk was drafted in the first round (13th overall) of the 2017 MLS SuperDraft by Real Salt Lake. Dunk signed with Salt Lake on February 28, 2017.
