= Yura Movsisyan =

Armenian footballer

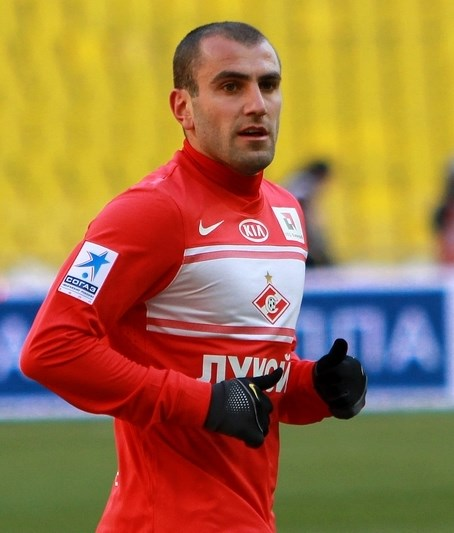
- Movsisyan with Spartak in 2013

Personal information
- Date of birth: 2 August 1987 (age 39)
- Place of birth: Leninakan, Armenian SSR, Soviet Union
- Height: 1.83 m (6 ft 0 in)
- Position: Striker

Youth career
- 2005–2006: Pasadena Lancers

Senior career*
Years	Team	Apps	(Gls)
2006–2007	Kansas City Wizards	28	(5)
2007–2009	Real Salt Lake	53	(15)
2010–2011	Randers	30	(12)
2011–2012	Krasnodar	50	(23)
2012–2016	Spartak Moscow	62	(25)
2016	→ Real Salt Lake (loan)	29	(9)
2017–2018	Real Salt Lake	28	(7)
2018	→ Djurgårdens IF (loan)	4	(0)
2018	Chicago Fire	4	(0)
Total		288	(96)

International career
2010–2018	Armenia	38	(14)
- * Club domestic league appearances and goals

Yura Movsisyan (Armenian: Յուրա Մովսիսյան; born August 2, 1987) is an Armenian former professional footballer who played as a striker. Most notably, Movsisyan played for Spartak Moscow in the Russian Premier League. He played for the Armenia national football team, ending his career with 14 goals in 38 international games.

== Early life ==
Yura Movsisyan was born 2 August 1987 to Armenian parents Sergey Movsisyan and Aida Sahakyan and brothers Movses and Hovhannes. His family arrived in the US in 2000, settling in the Los Angeles area, where there is a large Armenian community. Movsisyan attended Pasadena High School, and played a year of college soccer at Pasadena City College before being discovered by MLS scouts prior to the 2006 MLS SuperDraft. He stated that his football idol was Thierry Henry.

== Club career ==
=== Kansas City Wizards ===
Movsisyan was signed to a Generation Adidas contract and became the surprise of draft day, with the Kansas City Wizards (now known as Sporting Kansas City) selecting him with the fourth overall pick, the highest in MLS history for a player who did not go to a Division I college program or was not a U.S. youth international. After one game being unused, Movsisyan finally made his debut, coming on as a substitute, in a 2–1 loss against D.C. United on 13 May 2006. Movsisyan became a regular player in the first team by the end of his first professional season. The following season, Movsisyan scored his first goal of his professional career in a 3–0 win over Toronto FC on 25 April 2007. Soon after, this was followed up when he scored a brace against New York Red Bulls next month on 16 May 2007. He would score two more goals, rising up to five, against LA Galaxy and Chivas USA.

=== Real Salt Lake ===
In September 2007, Movsisyan was traded to Real Salt Lake in a deal involving MLS SuperDraft picks and an international roster spot. Movsisyan made his debut on 17 September 2007 in a 2–2 draw against Los Angeles Galaxy and setting up a goal for Carey Talley. At the last game of the season, Movsisyan received a red card, for the first time of his career, in a 1–0 loss against Houston Dynamo. The next season, Movsisyan would score his first goal in a 4–3 loss against Houston Dynamo on 16 August 2008. On 6 September 2008, Movsisyan scored and set up a goal for Will Johnson in a 2–2 draw against Los Angeles Galaxy, followed by scoring a brace in a 3–2 win over San Jose Earthquakes at the same months. Movsisyan was the player to score Real Salt Lake's first ever MLS Cup Playoffs goal when he scored the winner (and only goal) on 1 November 2008 at Rio Tinto Stadium, when the Utah side beat Chivas USA. At Real Salt Lake, Movsisyan had been on the goalscoring form. Movsisyan signed a pre-contract with Danish club Randers FC on 6 July 2009, with an agreement to join the club following the conclusion of the 2009 MLS season. Having helped Real Salt Lake win their first ever MLS Cup championship that season after beating Los Angeles Galaxy 5–4 on penalties although he was substituted in the second half, Movsisyan left the club and joined Randers on 1 January 2010.

=== Randers FC ===
Movsisyan made his debut for Randers FC on the opening game of the season in 0–0 draw against Esbjerg fB on 7 March 2010 and scored a brace twice in a 3–1 win over Silkeborg IF on 14 April 2010 and a 2–0 win over Midtjylland in the same month. By the end of the season, Movsisyan had made 13 appearances and scored 7 goals in an impressive form despite only playing in the second half of the season. During that season, Movsisyan scored twice and provided an assist for Søren Pedersen in a 6–1 win over Dudelange in the first round of Europa League and won 7–3 on aggregate to advance to the next round. Another match win in the Europa League, Movsisyan scored a brace in a 3–2 loss against Lausanne-Sport, but the club was eliminated after a 1–1 draw, which Movsisyan scored in the match. Movsisyan replaced the past season topscorer Marc Nygaard's position, from the first match of the spring season. In Denmark he established himself as a powerhouse, playing a major role in the saving of Randers FC from relegation from the Danish Superliga. His good performance led the Russian side Rubin Kazan and Ukrainian side Dynamo Kyiv.

=== Krasnodar ===
He was sold for €2.5 million to FC Krasnodar in Winter 2011. Movsisyan made his debut in an opening game of the season on 12 March 2011 in a 0–0 draw against Anzhi Makhachkala and scored his first goal in a 2–0 win over Spartak Nalchik in the next game. After fighting injury early in the season, Movsisyan has become a major producer on the team and has netted 14 goals, including a brace against Volga (that win would keep the club safe from relegation) and a goal, own goal and an assist in a 2–2 draw against Amkar Perm. At the end of the season, Movsisyan was selected as the Most Valuable Player of the Year for 2011 by the club. Even after the 2011–12 season, Movsisyan was named the top 10 best new foreign player and was the topscorer in the Relegation group. In the opening game of the season, Movsisyan scored a brace in a 2–1 win over Rubin Kazan and scored another and provide an assist for Joãozinho in a 3–1 win over Lokomotiv Moscow. He would score twice brace in a 2–2 draw against Amkar Perm and another goal and an assist for Dušan Anđelković in a 6–1 win over against Mordovia Saransk. His goal scoring made him linked with various clubs. But this did not stop Krasnodar as the club offered him a new three-year contract. However, the club couldn't match his salary offer, according to Manager Slavoljub Muslin. Movsisyan stated Krasnodar would always be dear to him and expressed gratitude to Krasnodar FC president Sergey Galitsky.

=== Spartak Moscow ===
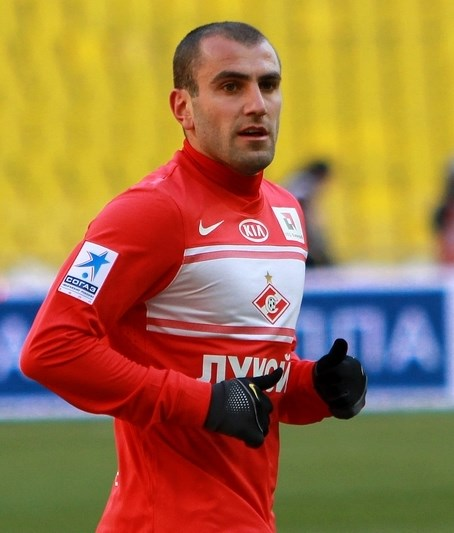
Movsisyan playing for Spartak Moscow in 2013

Movsisyan completed a move to Spartak Moscow on 8 December 2012 for a reported €7.5 million and signed a contract for 4.5 years with a salary of €1.5 million a year. He is the 7th most expensive transfer in Spartak history. On 10 March 2013, Movsisyan made his debut for the new club in a home game against Terek Grozny. Movsisyan had an immediate impact by scoring a hat-trick, leading Spartak to a 3–1 win. This was the first hat-trick Movsisyan scored in his career and he became the first Spartak player to score a hat-trick in his debut. His next goal came in a 2–0 home victory over Amkar Perm. Movsisiyan then sustained an injury in a 2–2 derby draw against CSKA Moscow and missed the next three games. At the end of the season his team finished 4th which means they have qualified for the play-off round of the UEFA Europa League. Next season started perfectly for Yura, he scored a goal in the first match of the season from a penalty, in a 2–1 victory over Kryliya Sovetov.

Spartak legends Nikita Simonyan and Alexander Mirzoyan personally sent well wishes to Movsisyan in connection with his becoming a Spartak player. Mirzoyan wished Movsisyan success and gave Movsisyan an autographed photo of him. Simonyan wrote to Movsisyan, "Dear Yura, I hope that you win more titles at Spartak than I. I wish you success!" Movsisyan replied, "It will be difficult to exceed Simonyan's achievements—[both] as a player and a coach. Thanks very much for such valuable gift. I know of Simonyan and Mirzoyan as the greatest players, and I am proud to be an Armenian just like them. I have not seen them play, but I know that they have done a lot for Spartak. I am not even close to them [in terms of accomplishments]. [But] I certainly do have plans. I want to score goals and achieve wins. [And] when something goes successfully, I will enter into history at that time."

=== Return to Real Salt Lake ===
On 15 January 2016, Real Salt Lake announced that it had signed Movsisyan as a designated player on loan from Spartak. Real acquired his rights on a permanent basis on 10 October 2016.

Movsisyan was waived by Salt Lake for league roster purposes on 2 March 2018, although he remained under contract.

=== Djurgårdens IF ===
On 25 March 2018, it was confirmed that Djurgården had signed Movsisyan on a 6-month long loan with a possible extension of another 6 months. He made his debut in a 2–0 loss against city rivals AIK, coming on as a substitute in the second half. After 16 minutes of play he was handed a straight red card. On 10 May 2018, he appeared for Djurgarden in a 3–0 victory over Malmö FF in the Swedish Cup Final. After sustaining a thigh injury which kept him out of the squad for several weeks, he left the club to continue his rehabilitation in the USA.

=== Chicago Fire ===
On 14 September 2018, Chicago Fire announced that they had acquired Movsisyan off waivers. On 26 November 2018, Chicago Fire announced that they had declined the option on Movsisyan's contract and that he would be leaving the club and be eligible for the 2019 MLS Re-Entry Draft.

== International career ==
On 9 August 2010, he joined the Armenia national team and made his debut in a friendly against Iran on 11 August 2010. He was one of the most prolific strikers in the UEFA Euro 2012 qualifying campaign, netting four goals and assisting on five others. As of March 2016, Movsisyan had been indefinitely ruled out from representing Armenia by the head of Armenia's Football Federation (FFA), Ruben Hayrapetyan, as a result of his lack of commitment to national team play, following allegation of match fixing during the EURO 2016 qualifying campaign. As he participated in official FIFA competitions via European Qualification matches with Armenia, he is not eligible to represent the United States. He had returned to the Armenian side by November 2018 and scored four goals against Gibraltar.

== Personal life ==
Movsisyan was raised in Los Angeles, holds Armenian and American citizenship. Movsisyan is married to Marianna and they have three children, daughters, Aida (b. 2012) Rita (b. 2016), and a son, Arman (b. 2010).

== Career statistics ==
As of 9 June 2018

=== Club ===
Appearances and goals by club, season and competition
Club	Season	League		Cup		Continental		Other		Total	
Club	Season	Apps	Goals	Apps	Goals	Apps	Goals	Apps	Goals	Apps	Goals
Kansas City Wizards	2006	10	0	0	0	0	0	0	0	10	0
Kansas City Wizards	2007	18	5	0	0	0	0	0	0	18	5
Kansas City Wizards	Total	28	5	0	0	0	0	0	0	28	5
Real Salt Lake	2007	5	0	0	0	0	0	0	0	5	0
Real Salt Lake	2008	22	7	0	0	0	0	3	1	25	8
Real Salt Lake	2009	26	8	0	0	0	0	4	0	30	8
Real Salt Lake	Total	53	15	0	0	0	0	7	1	60	16
Randers FC	2009–10	13	7	0	0	0	0	0	0	13	7
Randers FC	2010–11	17	5			5	5	0	0	22	10
Randers FC	Total	30	12	0	0	5	5	0	0	35	17
Krasnodar	2011–12	24	7	1	0	0	0	13	7	38	14
Krasnodar	2012–13	13	9	0	0	0	0	0	0	13	9
Krasnodar	Total	37	16	1	0	0	0	13	7	51	23
Spartak Moscow	2012–13	8	4	0	0	0	0	0	0	8	4
Spartak Moscow	2013–14	27	16	1	0	2	2	0	0	30	18
Spartak Moscow	2014–15	16	2	1	0	0	0	0	0	17	2
Spartak Moscow	2015–16	11	3	0	0	0	0	0	0	11	3
Spartak Moscow	Total	62	25	2	0	2	2	0	0	66	27
Real Salt Lake	2016	29	9	2	0	2	0	1	0	34	9
Real Salt Lake	2017	28	7	0	0	0	0	0	0	28	7
Real Salt Lake	Total	57	16	2	0	2	0	1	0	62	16
Djurgårdens IF	2018	4	0	0	0	0	0	0	0	4	0
Career total		271	89	15	5	9	7	21	8	314	109

=== International ===
Scores and results list Armenia's goal tally first, score column indicates score after each Movsisyan goal.

List of international goals scored by Yura Movsisyan
No.	Date	Venue	Opponent	Score	Result	Competition
1	7 September 2010	Philip II Arena, Skopje, Republic of Macedonia	North Macedonia	1–0	2–2	UEFA Euro 2012 qualification
2	8 October 2010	Republican Stadium, Yerevan, Armenia	Slovakia	1–0	3–1	UEFA Euro 2012 qualification
3	12 October 2010	Republican Stadium, Yerevan, Armenia	Andorra	3–0	4–0	UEFA Euro 2012 qualification
4	6 September 2011	Štadión pod Dubňom, Žilina, Slovakia	Slovakia	1–0	4–0	UEFA Euro 2012 qualification
5	6 May 2012	Republican Stadium, Yerevan, Armenia	Kazakhstan	3–0	3–0	Friendly
6	11 June 2013	Parken Stadium, Copenhagen, Denmark	Denmark	1–0	4–0	2014 FIFA World Cup qualification
7	11 June 2013	Parken Stadium, Copenhagen, Denmark	Denmark	3–0	4–0	2014 FIFA World Cup qualification
8	11 October 2013	Republican Stadium, Yerevan, Armenia	Bulgaria	2–1	2–1	2014 FIFA World Cup qualification
9	15 October 2013	Stadio San Paolo, Naples, Italy	Italy	1–0	2–2	2014 FIFA World Cup qualification
10	16 October 2018	Republican Stadium, Yerevan, Armenia	North Macedonia	2–0	4–0	2018–19 UEFA Nations League D
11	16 November 2018	Victoria Stadium, Gibraltar	Gibraltar	1–1	6–2	2018–19 UEFA Nations League D
12	16 November 2018	Victoria Stadium, Gibraltar	Gibraltar	2–1	6–2	2018–19 UEFA Nations League D
13	16 November 2018	Victoria Stadium, Gibraltar	Gibraltar	3–1	6–2	2018–19 UEFA Nations League D
14	16 November 2018	Victoria Stadium, Gibraltar	Gibraltar	4–1	6–2	2018–19 UEFA Nations League D

== Honours ==
Real Salt Lake

- MLS Cup: 2009

Djurgårdens IF

- Svenska Cupen: 2017–18

Individual

- FC Krasnodar Player of the Season: 2011–12
- Russian Premier League top scorer: 2012–13 (joint, 13 goals)
- Russian Premier League Player of the Month: August 2012
- List of 33 top players of the Russian league: 2013–14
