= Omar Holness =

Jamaican footballer (born 1994)

Personal information
- Full name: Omar Duke Holness
- Date of birth: 13 March 1994 (age 32)
- Place of birth: Kingston, Jamaica
- Height: 1.83 m (6 ft 0 in)
- Position: Midfielder

Youth career
- 2009–2011: Real Mona

College career
Years	Team	Apps	(Gls)
2013–2015	North Carolina Tar Heels	59	(5)

Senior career*
Years	Team	Apps	(Gls)
2014	Portland Timbers U23s	5	(1)
2016–2017	Real Salt Lake	18	(1)
2016–2017	→ Real Monarchs (loan)	9	(0)
2018	Bethlehem Steel	9	(2)
2019	San Roque	1	(0)
2019–2021	Darlington	38	(4)
2021–2022	Bath City	26	(1)
2023	Gloucester City	3	(0)
2023	Jaro	6	(1)
2024–2025	Hednesford Town	22	(0)

International career^{‡}
2011	Jamaica U17	8	(0)
2012–2013	Jamaica U20	6	(1)
2014–2015	Jamaica U23	6	(1)
2014–2021	Jamaica	5	(0)
Medal record
Men's football
Representing Jamaica
CONCACAF Gold Cup
Runner-up	2015 United States–Canada	Team
- * Club domestic league appearances and goals as of 14:09, 17 March 2025 (UTC) ‡ National team caps and goals as of 09:30, 26 March 2021 (UTC)

Omar Duke Holness (born 13 March 1994) is a Jamaican professional footballer who plays as a midfielder for the Jamaican national team.

Holness played college soccer in the United States before being drafted by Major League Soccer outfit Real Salt Lake in 2016. He also played for USL team Bethlehem Steel before joining English club Darlington in 2019. He later played for Bath City and Gloucester City in England and Jaro in Finland before returning to English football with Hednesford Town in 2024. In international football, he played for Jamaica at youth levels and has been capped five times for the senior team.

== College and club career ==
=== College and amateur ===
On 22 May 2013, it was announced that Holness committed to the University of North Carolina. In his first season with the Tar Heels, he made 20 appearances and finished the year with two goals and three assists. One of his two goals came on 21 November in a 1–0 win over the University of South Florida in the first round of the NCAA Tournament.

Holness also spent time with Portland Timbers U23s in the USL Premier Development League.

=== Professional club career ===
==== Real Salt Lake ====
Holness was drafted in the first round of the 2016 MLS SuperDraft (5th overall) by Real Salt Lake.

==== Bethlehem Steel ====
In January 2018, Holness signed for Bethlehem Steel FC of the USL. Bethlehem Steel released Holness at the end of the 2018 season.

==== Darlington ====
Holness signed for English National League North (sixth-tier) club Darlington on his 25th birthday. He started in their next match, a 2–1 win away to Nuneaton Borough; he was involved in the first goal but was sent off late in the match for a second yellow card.

On 9 November 2019, Holness scored Darlington's first goal as they held League Two side Walsall to a 2–2 draw in the first round of the FA Cup. He also scored the winner as Darlington beat National League team Solihull Moors 1–0 in the FA Trophy first round replay. At the end of the curtailed season he was offered terms for a further season but did not accept, and left the club having made 34 National League North appearances. Holness rejoined Darlington on 16 October 2020 on non-contract terms, and played in 11 matches, 7 in cup competitions and 4 in the National League North, whose season was again ended early because of the COVID-19 pandemic.

=== Bath City ===
Holness joined National League South club Bath City on 13 June 2021. His first goal for the club, an 82nd-minute header, secured an FA Cup second qualifying round win against ninth-tier opponents Shaftesbury.

=== Gloucester City ===
On 25 March 2023, Holness signed with National League North club Gloucester City.

=== FF Jaro ===
In July 2023, Holness joined Ykkönen side Jaro until the end of the season. On 25 June 2023, Holness signed a professional contract with Ykkönen side FF Jaro, scoring his first goal for the team three weeks later against HIFK in a 3–0 win at Jakobstads Centralplan stadium. He left the club at the end of 2023.

=== Hednesford Town ===
Holness signed for Northern Premier League Division One West club Hednesford Town in July 2024. After making 26 appearances in all competitions, he left the club by mutual agreement in March 2025.

== International career ==
Holness represented Jamaica at both the under-17 and under-20 level. On 5 September 2014, he received his first senior call up to the Jamaica national team. He made his debut on 9 September in a 3–1 defeat to Canada.

== Personal ==
In February 2018 Holness received a U.S. green card which qualifies him as a domestic player for MLS roster purposes. Holness completed his undergraduate degree in December 2022 from UNC-Chapel Hill.

== Honours ==
Hednesford Town

- Northern Premier League Division One West play-offs: 2025
