= 2013 Real Salt Lake season =

American soccer team season

Real Salt Lake
2013 season
- Owner: Dell Loy Hansen
- Coach: Jason Kreis
- Stadium: Rio Tinto Stadium
- MLS Season: Conference: 2nd Overall: 4th
- MLS Cup: Runner-up
- U.S. Open Cup: Runner-up
- Rocky Mountain Cup: Runner-up
- Desert Diamond Cup: Runner-up
- Highest home attendance: 20,504 (vs San Jose Earthquakes, September 21)
- Lowest home attendance: 17,480 (vs Vancouver Whitecaps FC, 4 May)
- Average home league attendance: 19,362
- Biggest win: RSL 4-0 CLB (8/24)
- Biggest defeat: LA 4-2 RSL (8/17)
Home colors	Away colors

The 2013 Real Salt Lake season was the team's ninth year of existence. The team finished the season as runners-up in the MLS Cup and U.S. Open Cup. As of 2024, this is the club's most recent MLS Cup or U.S. Open Cup final appearance.

== Preseason ==
January 28, 2013	Real Salt Lake	0–2	Denmark U20	Casa Grande, Arizona
11:30 (MST)		Report	38' (pen.) Bech; 72' (o.g.) Álvarez	Stadium: Grande Sports World

February 8, 2013	Los Angeles Galaxy	0–1	Real Salt Lake	Los Angeles, CA
13:00 (MST)		Report	27' Grabavoy	Stadium: Home Depot Center

=== Desert Diamond Cup ===
==== Standings ====
Pos	Team	Pld	W	L	D	GF	GA	GD	Pts
1	Seattle Sounders FC	3	3	0	0	6	1	+5	9
2	Real Salt Lake	3	1	1	1	6	6	0	4
3	New England Revolution	3	1	2	0	5	6	−1	3
4	New York Red Bulls	3	0	2	1	3	7	−4	1

==== Matches ====
February 13, 2013 Group 1	Real Salt Lake	2–2	New York Red Bulls	Tucson, Arizona
19:00 (MST)	Plata 1'; Grossman 3'	Report	Olave 31'; Bustamante 61'	Stadium: Kino Sports Complex

February 16, 2013 Group 2	Real Salt Lake	1–2	Seattle Sounders FC	Tucson, Arizona
16:00 (MST)	Schuler (yellow card) 20'; Mansally (yellow card) 34'; Stertzer 86'		Martínez 66'; Lund 69'	Stadium: Kino Sports Complex

February 20, 2013 Group 3	Real Salt Lake	3–2	New England Revolution	Tucson, Arizona
18:00 (MST)	Sandoval 22'; Álvarez (yellow card) 69'; Saborío 88'; Stephenson 90+'	Report	Dorman 50' (yellow card) 67'; Duckett (yellow card) 54'; Soares 57'	Stadium: Kino Sports Complex

February 23, 2013 Final	Real Salt Lake	0–1	Seattle Sounders FC	Tucson, Arizona
TBD (MST)		Report	Caskey 50'; Fairclough (yellow card) 66'	Stadium: Kino Sports Complex

== MLS regular season ==
=== Standings ===
==== Western Conference ====
Pos	Team	Pld	W	L	T	GF	GA	GD	Pts	Qualification
1	Portland Timbers	34	14	5	15	54	33	+21	57	MLS Cup Conference Semifinals
2	Real Salt Lake	34	16	10	8	57	41	+16	56	MLS Cup Conference Semifinals
3	LA Galaxy	34	15	11	8	53	38	+15	53	MLS Cup Conference Semifinals
4	Seattle Sounders FC	34	15	12	7	42	42	0	52	MLS Cup Knockout Round
5	Colorado Rapids	34	14	11	9	45	38	+7	51	MLS Cup Knockout Round
6	San Jose Earthquakes	34	14	11	9	35	42	−7	51	
7	Vancouver Whitecaps FC	34	13	12	9	53	45	+8	48	
8	FC Dallas	34	11	12	11	48	52	−4	44	
9	Chivas USA	34	6	20	8	30	67	−37	26	

Source: MLS

==== Overall table ====
Note: the table below has no impact on playoff qualification and is used solely for determining host of the MLS Cup, certain CCL spots, and 2014 MLS draft. The conference tables are the sole determinant for teams qualifying to the playoffs

Pos	Team	Pld	W	L	T	GF	GA	GD	Pts	Qualification
1	New York Red Bulls (S)	34	17	9	8	58	41	+17	59	CONCACAF Champions League
2	Sporting Kansas City (C)	34	17	10	7	47	30	+17	58	CONCACAF Champions League
3	Portland Timbers	34	14	5	15	54	33	+21	57	CONCACAF Champions League
4	Real Salt Lake	34	16	10	8	57	41	+16	56	
5	LA Galaxy	34	15	11	8	53	38	+15	53	
6	Seattle Sounders FC	34	15	12	7	42	42	0	52	
7	New England Revolution	34	14	11	9	49	38	+11	51	
8	Colorado Rapids	34	14	11	9	45	38	+7	51	
9	Houston Dynamo	34	14	11	9	41	41	0	51	
10	San Jose Earthquakes	34	14	11	9	35	42	−7	51	
11	Montreal Impact	34	14	13	7	50	49	+1	49	CONCACAF Champions League
12	Chicago Fire	34	14	13	7	47	52	−5	49	
13	Vancouver Whitecaps FC	34	13	12	9	53	45	+8	48	
14	Philadelphia Union	34	12	12	10	42	44	−2	46	
15	FC Dallas	34	11	12	11	48	52	−4	44	
16	Columbus Crew	34	12	17	5	42	46	−4	41	
17	Toronto FC	34	6	17	11	30	47	−17	29	
18	Chivas USA	34	6	20	8	30	67	−37	26	
19	D.C. United	34	3	24	7	22	59	−37	16	CONCACAF Champions League

Source: MLS
Rules for classification: 1) points; 2) head-to-head record; 3) goal difference; 4) number of goals scored
(C) MLS Cup Champion; (S) Supporters' Shield

=== Results summary ===
Overall								Home						Away					
Pld	Pts	W	L	T	GF	GA	GD	W	L	T	GF	GA	GD	W	L	T	GF	GA	GD
28	48	14	8	6	39	26	+13	10	2	3	20	10	+10	4	6	3	19	16	+3

Last updated: August 16, 2013
Source: MLS Results
Pld = Matches played; Pts = Points; W = Matches won; T = Matches tied; L = Matches lost; GF = Goals for; GA = Goals against; GD = Goal difference

=== Results by round ===
Round	1	2	3	4	5	6	7	8	9	10	11	12	13	14	15	16	17	18	19	20	21	22	23	24	25	26	27	28	29	30	31	32	33	34
Stadium	A	A	H	A	H	A	A	H	H	H	A	A	A	H	H	H	H	A	H	A	H	A	A	H	A	A	H	H	A	H	A	H	A	H
Result	W	L	D	L	W	L	D	W	L	W	W	L	W	D	W	W	W	W	D	W	L	L	D	W	L	D	W	W	L	L	W	D	D	W

Updated to match(es) played on August 10, 2013. Source: RealSaltLake.com
A = Away; H = Home; W = Win; D = Draw; L = Loss

=== Match results ===
March 3, 2013 1	San Jose Earthquakes	0–2	Real Salt Lake	Santa Clara, CA
19:00 PDT	Bernardez (yellow card) 64'	Report	Mansally (yellow card) 61'; Saborío 71', 85'; Rimando (yellow card) 87'	Stadium: Buck Shaw Stadium; Attendance: 10525; Referee: Hilario Grajeda

March 9, 2013 2	D.C. United	1–0	Real Salt Lake	Washington, D.C.
19:00 EDT	Pajoy (yellow card) 28' (goal) 60'	Report	Beltran (yellow card) 31'; Mansally (yellow card) 63'; Beckerman (yellow card) 87'; Saborío (yellow card) 90+3'	Stadium: RFK Stadium; Attendance: 17072; Referee: Sorin Stoica

March 16, 2013 3 – Rocky Mountain Cup	Real Salt Lake	1–1	Colorado Rapids	Sandy, UT
16:00 MDT	Watson-Siriboe (yellow card) 6'; Saborío 80'		Harris (yellow card) 9'; Brown 37'; Thomas (yellow card) 49'	Stadium: Rio Tinto Stadium; Attendance: 20370; Referee: David Gantar

March 23, 2013 4	FC Dallas	2–0	Real Salt Lake	Frisco, TX
19:30 CDT	Castillo 70'; Jackson 81'	Report	Alvarez (yellow card) 37' (yellow-red card) 83'; Grabavoy (yellow card) 91'	Stadium: FC Dallas Stadium; Attendance: 11181; Referee: Juan Guzman

March 30, 2013 5	Real Salt Lake	2–1	Seattle Sounders FC	Sandy, UT
19:00 MDT	Findley 8'; Gil 35'	Report	Evans 57'; Rose (yellow card) 87'	Stadium: Rio Tinto Stadium; Attendance: 20359; Referee: Mark Geiger

April 6, 2013 6 – Rocky Mountain Cup	Colorado Rapids	1–0	Real Salt Lake	Commerce City, CO
19:00 MDT	Harris 5'; Klute (yellow card) 80'	Report		Stadium: Dick's Sporting Goods Park; Attendance: 15226; Referee: Chris Penso

April 13, 2013 7	Vancouver Whitecaps FC	1–1	Real Salt Lake	Vancouver, BC
13:00 PDT	Sanvezzo 84'	Report	Schuler (yellow card) 18'; García 66' (yellow card) 67'; Palmer (yellow card) 81'	Stadium: BC Place; Attendance: 18612; Referee: Drew Fischer

April 20, 2013 8	Real Salt Lake	1–0	C.D. Chivas USA	Sandy, UT
19:00 MDT	Morales 53'; Grabavoy (yellow card) 76'; Palmer (yellow card) 90'	Report	de Luna (yellow card) 18'; Burling (yellow card) 58'; Velázquez (yellow card) 87'; Mejia (red card) 94'	Stadium: Rio Tinto Stadium; Attendance: 14900; Referee: Jorge Gonzalez

April 27, 2013 9	Real Salt Lake	0–2	Los Angeles Galaxy	Sandy, UT
19:00 MDT	Magee 6'; Rugg 13'; Juninho (yellow card) 54'	Report	Palmer (yellow card) 20'	Stadium: Rio Tinto Stadium; Attendance: 17655; Referee: Edvin Jurisevic

May 4, 2013 10	Real Salt Lake	2–0	Vancouver Whitecaps FC	Sandy, UT
19:00 MDT	Gil 47'; Morales 71'; Wingert (yellow card) 79'	Report	Reo-Coker (yellow card) 19'; Koffie (yellow card) 87'	Stadium: Rio Tinto Stadium; Attendance: 17480; Referee: Juan Guzman

May 8, 2013 11	New England Revolution	1–2	Real Salt Lake	Foxborough, MA
20:00 EDT	Guy 51'; Nguyen (yellow card) 59'; Toja (yellow card) 74'	Report	Carlos Salcedo (yellow card) 35' (yellow-red card) 91'; Sandoval 77'; García 89'	Stadium: Gillette Stadium; Attendance: 8040; Referee: Jose Carlos Rivero

May 11, 2013 12	Montreal Impact	3–2	Real Salt Lake	Montreal, QC
14:00 EDT	Camara (yellow card) 29'; Felipe 39'; Di Vaio 80'; Tissot (yellow card) 89'; Nyassi (yellow card) 91'; Ferrari 93' (yellow card) 93'	Report	Ferrari 7' (o.g.); Grabavoy (yellow card) 40'; Beckerman 77'; Rimando (yellow card) 91'	Stadium: Saputo Stadium; Attendance: 14578; Referee: Allen Chapman

May 19, 2013 13	C.D. Chivas USA	1–4	Real Salt Lake	Carson, CA
19:30 PDT	Ponce (yellow card) 33'; Vilchez (yellow card) 34'; Villafaña 55'	Report	Grabavoy 4', 91'; Plata 48'; Findley 78'; Alvarez (yellow card) 84'	Stadium: Home Depot Center; Referee: Sorin Stoica

May 25, 2013 14	Real Salt Lake	1–1	Chicago Fire	Sandy, UT
19:00 MDT	Saborío 78'; Morales (yellow card) 94'	Report	Amarikwa 84'; Nyarko (yellow card) 85'	Stadium: Rio Tinto Stadium; Attendance: 18293; Referee: Chris Penso

June 1, 2013 15	Real Salt Lake	3–0	San Jose Earthquakes	Sandy, UT
19:30 MDT	Morales 16'; Stephenson (yellow card) 24'; Grabavoy 33'; Findley 38'; Mansally (yellow card) 77'	Report	Cronin (yellow card) 39'; Gordon (yellow card) 49'	Stadium: Rio Tinto Stadium; Attendance: 19,064; Referee: Silviu Petrescu

June 8, 2013 16	Real Salt Lake	3–1	Los Angeles Galaxy	Sandy, UT
19:30 MDT	Stephenson 44'; Beckerman (yellow card) 54'; Wingert (yellow card) 79'; García 84', 92'	Report	Donovan 46'; Sarvas (yellow card) 91'	Stadium: Rio Tinto Stadium; Attendance: 18962; Referee: Drew Fischer

June 22, 2013 17	Real Salt Lake	2–0	Seattle Sounders FC	Sandy, UT
19:30 MDT	Wingert (yellow card) 24'; Beckerman 41', (yellow card) 59'; Findley 46'	Report	González (yellow card) 61'; Traoré (yellow card) 74'	Stadium: Rio Tinto Stadium; Attendance: 19,848; Referee: Armando Villareal

June 29, 2013 18	Toronto FC	0–1	Real Salt Lake	Toronto, ON
11:00 MDT	Koevermans (yellow card) 37'; Richter (yellow card) 60'; Henry (red card) 79'; Caldwell (yellow card) 93'	Report	García (yellow card) 25'; Palmer (yellow card) 34'; Álvarez 45'; Findley (yellow card) 79'; Beltran (red card) 79'	Stadium: BMO Field; Attendance: 20,481; Referee: Chris Penso

July 3, 2013 19	Real Salt Lake	2–2	Philadelphia Union	Sandy, UT
20:00 MDT	Palmer (red card) 59'; Gil 75'; Wingert (yellow card) 90+'; Morales 90+' (pen.)	Report	Le Toux 13'; Carroll (yellow card) 33'; Casey 76'; Wheeler (yellow card) 90+'	Stadium: Rio Tinto Stadium; Attendance: 20,446; Referee: Ismail Elfath

July 13, 2013 20	FC Dallas	0–3	Real Salt Lake	Frisco, TX
18:00 CDT	Keel (yellow card) 45+'; Castillo (yellow card) 90+'	Report	Morales 38'; Álvarez (yellow card) 47'; Grabavoy 79'; García 90'	Stadium: FC Dallas Stadium; Attendance: 16,560; Referee: Drew Fischer

July 20, 2013 21	Real Salt Lake	1–2	Sporting Kansas City	Sandy, UT
20:00 MDT	Wingert (yellow card) 3' (yellow-red card) 66'; Gil (yellow card) 37'; Morales (yellow card) 44'; Findley 56'	Report	Rosell (yellow card) 55'; Saad 67'; Collin (yellow card) 73'; Opara 90+'	Stadium: Rio Tinto Stadium; Attendance: 19,832; Referee: Matthew Forrester

July 27, 2013 22	New York Red Bulls	4–3	Real Salt Lake	Harrison, NJ
19:00 EDT	Cahill 11'; Espindola 23' (Jonathan) Steele (yellow card) 68'; Olave (yellow card) 76'; Cahill (yellow card) 78'; Espindola 89'; McCarty 90+4' (yellow card) 90+6'	Report	Alvarez (yellow card) 4'; Saborío 45', 80', 82'; Garcia (yellow card) 64'; Maund (yellow card) 88'	Stadium: Red Bull Arena; Attendance: 18604; Referee: Silviu Petrescu

August 3, 2013 23 – Rocky Mountain Cup	Colorado Rapids	2–2	Real Salt Lake	Commerce City, CO
19:00 MDT	Brown 9'; Irwin (yellow card) 21'; Castrillon 70'; O'Neill (yellow card) 90'	Report	Grabavoy 2'; Saborío 21'; Beckerman (yellow card) 73'	Stadium: Dick's Sporting Goods Park; Attendance: 16814; Referee: Fotis Bazakos

August 10, 2013 24	Real Salt Lake	1–0	Houston Dynamo	Sandy, UT
19:30 MDT	Grabavoy (yellow card) 15'; Saborío 37'; Garcia (yellow card) 68'	Report	Clark (yellow card) 9'	Stadium: Rio Tinto Stadium; Attendance: 19402; Referee: Jose Carlos Rivero

August 17, 2013 25	Los Angeles Galaxy	4–2	Real Salt Lake	Carson, CA
19:30 PDT	Keane 56'; Keane 67'; Gonzalez 75'; Keane 86'	Report	Plata 53'; Beckerman (yellow card) 57'; Findley 90+'	Stadium: Home Depot Center; Attendance: 24237; Referee: Hilario Grajeda

August 21, 2013 26	Portland Timbers	3–3	Real Salt Lake	Portland, OR
20:00 PDT	Wallace 24'; Veleri 57' (pen.); Alhassan 86'	Report	Borchers 38'; Morales 43' (pen.); Grossman 90+'	Stadium: Jeld-Wen Field; Attendance: 20674; Referee: Ricardo Salazar

August 24, 2013 27	Real Salt Lake	4–0	Columbus Crew	Sandy, UT
19:30 MDT	Sandoval (yellow card) 39'; Beckerman 45+'; Sandoval 51'; Gil 83'; Beckerman 89'	Report	Higuain (yellow card) 34' (yellow-red card) 90+'; Oduro (yellow card) 80'	Stadium: Rio Tinto Stadium; Attendance: 18398; Referee: Silviu Petrescu

August 30, 2013 28	Real Salt Lake	4–2	Portland Timbers	Sandy, UT
20:00 MDT	Gil 9'; Plata 15'; Salcedo (yellow card) 50'; Plata (yellow card) 44'; Gil (yellow card) 48'; Morales 55'; Beckerman (yellow card) 58'; Saborío 67'	Report	Nagbe 31'; Jean-Baptiste (yellow card) 44'; Zemanski (yellow card) 45+' (yellow-red card); Zizzo 78'	Stadium: Rio Tinto Stadium; Attendance: 20252; Referee: Baldomero Toledo

September 13, 2013 29	Seattle Sounders FC	2–0	Real Salt Lake	Seattle, WA
19:00 PDT	Martins 3'; Neagle 38'; Yedlin (yellow card) 79'	Report	Morales (yellow card) 33'; Salcedo (yellow card) 60'; Grabavoy (yellow card) 63'; García (yellow card) 70'; Stephenson (yellow card) 85'; Beckerman (yellow card) 89'	Stadium: CenturyLink Field; Attendance: 55,107; Referee: Allen Chapman

September 21, 2013 30	Real Salt Lake	1–2	San Jose Earthquakes	Sandy, UT
19:00 MDT	Morales 19'; Wingert (yellow card) 65'	Report	Lenhart 18'; Lenhart 21'; Goodson (yellow card) 67'; Bernárdez (yellow card) 73'; Busch (yellow card) 93'	Stadium: Rio Tinto Stadium; Attendance: 20,504; Referee: Chris Penso

September 28, 2013 31	Vancouver Whitecaps FC	0–1	Real Salt Lake	Vancouver, BC
TBD	DeMerit (yellow card) 63'; Harvey (yellow card) 80'	Report	Sandoval 9'	Stadium: BC Place; Attendance: 21,000; Referee: Baldomero Toledo

October 5, 2013 32	Real Salt Lake	1–1	FC Dallas	Sandy, UT
19:00 MDT	Mansally (red card) 17'; Saborío 60'; Morales (yellow card) 69'	Recap	Perez (yellow card) 13'; Cooper 72'; Luccin (yellow card) 78'	Stadium: Rio Tinto Stadium; Attendance: 20,488; Referee: Hilario Grajeda

October 19, 2013 33	Portland Timbers	0–0	Real Salt Lake	Portland, OR
19:30 PDT	Alvarez (yellow card) 74'	Recap	Chara (yellow card) 85'	Stadium: Jeld-Wen Field; Attendance: 20,674; Referee: Kevin Stott

October 23, 2013 34	Real Salt Lake	2–1	C.D. Chivas USA	Sandy, UT
19:00 MDT	Schuler (yellow card) 13'; Borchers (yellow card) 31'; Saborío 49'; Plata 52'	Recap	Torres (yellow card) 45+'; Minda (yellow card) 47'; Morales 77'	Stadium: Rio Tinto Stadium; Attendance: 20,447; Referee: Silviu Petrescu

== MLS Cup Playoffs ==
=== Bracket ===
Knockout
E4	Houston	3
E5	Montreal	0
W4	Seattle	2
W5	Colorado	0

Conference semifinals
E1	New York	2	1	3
E4	Houston (a.e.t.)	2	2	4
Eastern Conference
E2	Kansas City (a.e.t.)	1	3	4
E3	New England	2	1	3
W1	Portland	2	3	5
W4	Seattle	1	2	3
Western Conference
W2	Salt Lake (a.e.t.)	0	2	2
W3	Los Angeles	1	0	1

Conference finals
E4	Houston	0	1	1
E2	Kansas City	0	2	2
W1	Portland	2	0	2
W2	Salt Lake	4	1	5

MLS Cup
E2	Kansas City (p)	1 (7)
W2	Salt Lake	1 (6)

=== Results ===
==== Conference semifinals ====
November 3, 2013 1st Leg	Los Angeles Galaxy	1–0	Real Salt Lake	StubHub Center, Carson
6:00 p.m. PST	Juninho (yellow card) 25'; Franklin 48'; Garcia (yellow card) 84'	Report	Beckerman (yellow card) 23'	Attendance: 27,000; Referee: Kevin Stott

November 7, 2013 2nd Leg	Real Salt Lake	2–0 (a.e.t.)	Los Angeles Galaxy	Rio Tinto Stadium, Sandy
7:00 p.m. MST	Velásquez 35'; Saborío (yellow card) 69'; Stephenson (yellow card) 97'; Schuler 102'	Report		Attendance: 19,042; Referee: Baldomero Toledo

Real Salt Lake won 2–1 on aggregate

==== Conference finals ====
November 10, 2013 1st Leg	Real Salt Lake	4–2	Portland Timbers	Rio Tinto Stadium, Sandy
7:00 p.m. MST	Schuler 35'; Findley 41'; Sandoval 48'; Morales 82'	Report	Johnson 14'; Valencia (yellow card) 90'; Piquionne 90+4'	Attendance: 17,333; Referee: Armando Villarreal

November 24, 2013 2nd Leg	Portland Timbers	0–1	Real Salt Lake	Jeld-Wen Field, Portland
6:00 p.m. PST	Kah (yellow card) 85'	Report	Palmer (yellow card) 7'; Findley 29'; Schuler (yellow card) 55'	Attendance: 20,674; Referee: Mark Geiger

Real Salt Lake won 5–2 on aggregate

==== MLS Cup Final ====
December 7, 2013
3:00 p.m. CST
MLS Cup

Sporting Kansas City	1–1 (a.e.t.)	Real Salt Lake
Collin (yellow card) 35'; Collin 76'; Feilhaber (yellow card) 104'	Report	Wingert (yellow card) 24'; Saborío (yellow card) 44'; Saborío 52'; Beckerman (yellow card) 100'
Penalties
Bieler (penalty scored); Nagamura (penalty scored); Besler (penalty missed); Feilhaber (penalty scored); Zusi (penalty missed); Sinovic (penalty scored); Sapong (penalty scored); Olum (penalty missed); Myers (penalty scored); Collin (penalty scored)	7–6	(penalty missed) Saborío; (penalty missed) Grabavoy; (penalty scored) Beckerman; (penalty scored) Plata; (penalty scored) Morales; (penalty scored) Schuler; (penalty scored) Beltran; (penalty missed) Velásquez; (penalty scored) Borchers; (penalty missed) Palmer

Sporting Park, Kansas City, Kansas
Attendance: 21,650
Referee: Hilario Grajeda

== U.S. Open Cup ==
Kickoff times are in MDT

May 28, 2013 Third Round	Real Salt Lake	3–2 (a.e.t.)	Atlanta Silverbacks	Sandy, UT
9:30 PM	Beckerman 3'; Alvarez (yellow card) 4'; Morales (yellow card) 68'; Sandoval 98'; Stephenson 101'; Grabavoy (yellow card) 117'	Report	Barrera (yellow card) 44'; Blanco (yellow card) 65'; Carr (yellow card) 80'; Gulley 86'; Cruz 121'	Stadium: Rio Tinto Stadium

June 12, 2013 Fourth Round	Real Salt Lake	5–2 (a.e.t.)	Charleston Battery	Sandy, UT
7:30 PM	Sandoval 66'; Plata 79' (pen.); Sandoval (yellow card) 93' (goal) 97'; Stephenson 105'; Morales 108' (pen.)	Report	Kelly 15'; Paterson 18' (yellow card) 56'; Azira (yellow card) 57'; Wilson (yellow card) 93'; Ellison (yellow card) 112'	Stadium: Rio Tinto Stadium

June 26, 2013 Quarterfinals	Real Salt Lake	3–0	Carolina RailHawks	Sandy, UT
7:30 PM	Beltran 35'; Wingert 50'; Saborío 86'	Report		Stadium: Rio Tinto Stadium; Attendance: 10,287; Referee: Fotis Bazakos

August 7, 2013 Semifinals	Real Salt Lake	2–1	Portland Timbers	Sandy, UT
7:30 PM	Saborío 7'; Salcedo (yellow card) 42'; Plata 78'	Report	Johnson (yellow card) 42'; Valeri 90+1'; Kah (yellow card) 90+4'	Stadium: Rio Tinto Stadium; Referee: Mark Geiger

October 1, 2013 Finals	Real Salt Lake	0–1	D.C. United	Sandy, UT
7:00 PM	Beckerman (yellow card) 45+2'; Rimando (yellow card) 90'	Report	Riley (yellow card) 21'; Neal 45'; DeLeon (yellow card) 58'; Korb (yellow card) 80'	Stadium: Rio Tinto Stadium; Attendance: 20,507; Referee: Juan Guzman

== Club ==
=== Roster ===
Note: Flags indicate national team as defined under FIFA eligibility rules; some limited exceptions apply. Players may hold more than one non-FIFA nationality. Squad correct as of October 5, 2013.

No.	Pos.	Nation	Player
1	GK	MEX	Lalo Fernández (HGP)
2	DF	USA	Tony Beltran
3	DF	USA	Kwame Watson-Siriboe
4	DF	USA	Aaron Maund
5	MF	USA	Kyle Beckerman (Captain)
6	DF	USA	Nat Borchers
7	MF	JAM	Lovel Palmer
8	FW	ECU	Joao Plata
10	FW	USA	Robbie Findley
11	MF	ARG	Javier Morales (DP)
12	MF	USA	Cole Grossman
13	FW	COL	Olmes García
14	FW	CUB	Yordany Álvarez
15	FW	CRC	Álvaro Saborío
16	DF	MEX	Carlos Salcedo (HGP)
17	DF	USA	Chris Wingert
18	GK	USA	Nick Rimando
19	DF	URU	Enzo Martinez
20	MF	USA	Ned Grabavoy
21	MF	USA	Luis Gil
22	MF	POR	David Viana
22	MF	USA	Benji Lopez (HGP)
23	MF	JAM	Khari Stephenson
24	GK	USA	Jeff Attinella
25	DF	USA	Rich Balchan
26	MF	USA	Sebastián Velásquez
27	MF	USA	John Stertzer
28	DF	USA	Chris Schuler
29	DF	GAM	Abdoulie Mansally
44	DF	USA	Brandon McDonald
45	GK	USA	Josh Saunders
49	FW	USA	Devon Sandoval

=== Transfers ===
==== In ====
#	Position	Player	Previous Club	Fees/Notes	Date	Source
7	MF	(Jamaica) Lovel Palmer	(United States) Portland Timbers	First round 2012 Re-Entry Draft	December 14, 2012	
10	FW	(United States) Robbie Findley	(England) Nottingham Forest	Allocation money to Portland Timbers (undisclosed)	January 17, 2013	
49	FW	(United States) Devon Sandoval	(United States) New Mexico Lobos	Second round draft pick (29th overall)	January 17, 2013	
27	MF	(United States) John Stertzer	(United States) Maryland Terrapins	First round draft pick (12th overall)	January 17, 2013	
8	FW	(Ecuador) Joao Plata	(Canada) Toronto FC	Second round pick in the 2015 MLS SuperDraft	January 30, 2013	
13	FW	(Colombia) Olmes García	(Colombia) Deportes Quindio	Undisclosed	February 21, 2013	
45	GK	(Puerto Rico) Josh Saunders	(United States) Los Angeles Galaxy	Free	February 22, 2013	
45	MF	(Jamaica) Khari Stephenson	(United States) San Jose Earthquakes	Free	February 22, 2013	
12	MF	(United States) Cole Grossman	(United States) Columbus Crew	MLS Waiver Draft	November 19, 2012	
24	GK	(United States) Jeff Attinella	(United States) Tampa Bay Rowdies	Undisclosed	December 3, 2012	
4	DF	(United States) Aaron Maund	(Canada) Toronto FC	Trade for Justin Braun	December 3, 2012	
22	FW	(United States) Benji Lopez	(United States) Real Salt Lake – Arizona Academy	Graduate	July 15, 2013	
25	DF	(United States) Rich Balchan	(United States) Columbus Crew	Undisclosed	March 2, 2013	

==== Out ====
#	Position	Player	Next Club	Fees/Notes	Date	Source
22	MF	(Portugal) David Viana	(England) Luton Town F.C.	Waived	July 11, 2013	
4	FW	(United States) Justin Braun	(Canada) Toronto FC	Trade for Aaron Maund	December 3, 2012	
4	DF	(Colombia) Jámison Olave	(United States) New York Red Bulls	Exchange for allocation money (undisclosed)	December 3, 2012	
10	FW	(Argentina) Fabián Espíndola	(United States) New York Red Bulls	Exchange for allocation money (undisclosed)	December 3, 2012	
8	MF	(Canada) Will Johnson	(United States) Portland Timbers	Exchange for allocation money (undisclosed)	December 3, 2012	
23	FW	(Brazil) Paulo Jr.	(United States) Fort Lauderdale Strikers	Released to MLS Re-Entry Draft	December 3, 2012	
23	MF	(Northern Ireland) Jonny Steele	(United States) New York Red Bulls	Released to MLS Re-Entry Draft	December 3, 2012	
24	GK	(United States) Kyle Reynish	(United States) New York Cosmos	Released to MLS Re-Entry Draft	December 3, 2012	
23	FW	(Argentina) Emiliano Bonfigli	(Argentina) Club Atlético San Telmo	Released to MLS Re-Entry Draft	December 3, 2012	

=== Coaching and technical staff ===
Position	Staff
General Manager	(United States) Garth Lagerwey
Head Coach	(United States) Jason Kreis
Assistant Coach(es)	(United States) Jeff Cassar (United States) Miles Joseph (United States) C. J. Brown
Strength and Conditioning Coach	(United States) Dan Barlow
Strength and Conditioning Coach	(United States) Dan Barlow
Director of Soccer Operations	(United States) Eliott Fall
Team Administrator	(Mexico) Salvador Pérez
Head Athletic Trainer	(United States) Tyson Pace
Assistant Athletic Trainer	(United States) Kevin Christen
Equipment Manager	(United States) Mike Fratto
Head Scout	(Jamaica) Andy Williams

Last updated: May 24, 2012
Source: Real Salt Lake

=== Kits ===
Home	Away

Type	Shirt	Shorts	Socks	First appearance / Info
Home	Claret / Cobalt right sleeve	Claret	Claret	
Away	White / Cobalt right sleeve	White	White	

== Statistics ==
=== Appearances and goals ===
As of February 1, 2014

No.	Pos	Nat	Player	Total		MLS		MLS Cup		U.S. Open Cup	
No.	Pos	Nat	Player	Apps	Goals	Apps	Goals	Apps	Goals	Apps	Goals
1	GK	(Mexico) MEX	Lalo Fernández	0	0	0+0	0	0+0	0	0+0	0
2	DF	(United States) USA	Tony Beltran	34	1	24+1	0	5+0	0	4+0	1
3	DF	(United States) USA	Kwame Watson-Siriboe	8	0	7+0	0	0+0	0	1+0	0
4	DF	(United States) USA	Aaron Maund	4	0	3+0	0	0+0	0	1+0	0
5	MF	(United States) USA	Kyle Beckerman	36	5	26+0	4	5+0	0	5+0	1
6	DF	(United States) USA	Nat Borchers	32	1	28+0	1	0+0	0	4+0	0
7	DF	(Jamaica) JAM	Lovel Palmer	22	0	14+3	0	1+3	0	1+0	0
8	FW	(Ecuador) ECU	Joao Plata	36	6	19+10	4	0+2	0	1+4	2
10	FW	(United States) USA	Robbie Findley	34	8	17+8	6	4+1	2	3+1	0
11	MF	(Argentina) ARG	Javier Morales	38	10	25+3	8	5+0	1	4+1	1
12	MF	(United States) USA	Cole Grossman	5	1	2+2	1	0+1	0	0+0	0
13	FW	(Colombia) COL	Olmes García	29	5	8+16	5	0+2	0	1+2	0
14	MF	(Cuba) CUB	Yordany Álvarez	22	1	11+7	1	1+0	0	1+2	0
15	FW	(Costa Rica) CRC	Álvaro Saborío	22	15	15+1	12	3+0	1	3+0	2
16	DF	(Mexico) MEX	Carlos Salcedo	17	0	12+1	0	0+0	0	4+0	0
17	DF	(United States) USA	Chris Wingert	30	1	20+1	0	4+0	0	5+0	1
18	GK	(United States) USA	Nick Rimando	34	0	27+0	0	5+0	0	2+0	0
19	MF	(Uruguay) URU	Enzo Martinez	0	0	0+0	0	0+0	0	0+0	0
20	MF	(United States) USA	Ned Grabavoy	41	5	29+3	5	3+1	0	4+1	0
21	MF	(United States) USA	Luis Gil	36	5	24+6	5	5+0	0	1+0	0
22	MF	(Portugal) POR	David Viana	0	0	0+0	0	0+0	0	0+0	0
22	MF	(United States) USA	Benji Lopez	0	0	0+0	0	0+0	0	0+0	0
23	MF	(Jamaica) JAM	Khari Stephenson	25	3	9+10	1	0+1	0	2+3	2
24	GK	(United States) USA	Jeff Attinella	5	0	4+1	0	0+0	0	0+0	0
25	DF	(United States) USA	Rich Balchan	0	0	0+0	0	0+0	0	0+0	0
26	MF	(Colombia) COL	Sebastián Velásquez	27	1	9+10	0	2+3	1	3+0	0
27	MF	(United States) USA	John Stertzer	0	0	0+0	0	0+0	0	0+0	0
28	DF	(United States) USA	Chris Schuler	21	2	16+0	0	5+0	2	0+0	0
29	DF	(The Gambia) GAM	Abdoulie Mansally	18	0	9+8	0	1+0	0	0+0	0
44	DF	(United States) USA	Brandon McDonald	3	0	3+0	0	0+0	0	0+0	0
45	GK	(Puerto Rico) PUR	Josh Saunders	6	0	3+0	0	0+0	0	3+0	0
49	FW	(United States) USA	Devon Sandoval	23	7	10+7	3	2+1	1	2+1	3

=== Top scorers ===
Place	Position	Number	Name	MLS	MLS Cup	U.S. Open Cup	Total
1	FW	15	(Costa Rica) Álvaro Saborío	12	1	2	15
2	MF	11	(Argentina) Javier Morales	8	1	1	10
3	FW	10	(United States) Robbie Findley	6	2	0	8
4	FW	49	(United States) Devon Sandoval	3	1	3	7
5	FW	22	(Ecuador) Joao Plata	4	0	2	6
6	FW	13	(Colombia) Olmes García	5	0	0	5
6	MF	21	(United States) Luis Gil	5	0	0	5
6	MF	20	(United States) Ned Grabavoy	5	0	0	5
6	MF	5	(United States) Kyle Beckerman	4	0	1	5
7	MF	23	(Jamaica) Khari Stephenson	1	0	2	3
8	DF	28	(United States) Chris Schuler	0	2	0	2
9	DF	4	(United States) Nat Borchers	1	0	0	1
9	MF	12	(United States) Cole Grossman	1	0	0	1
9	MF	14	(Cuba) Yordany Álvarez	1	0	0	1
9	MF	26	(Colombia) Sebastián Velásquez	0	1	0	1
9	DF	2	(United States) Tony Beltran	0	0	1	1
9	DF	17	(United States) Chris Wingert	0	0	1	1
TOTALS				56	8	13	77

=== Disciplinary record ===
Number	Nationality	Position	Name	MLS		MLS Cup		U.S. Open Cup		Total	
Number	Nationality	Position	Name	Booked	Sent off (straight red)	Booked	Sent off (straight red)	Booked	Sent off (straight red)	Booked	Sent off (straight red)
14	(Cuba)	MF	Yordany Álvarez	5	2	0	0	1	0	6	2
17	(United States)	DF	Chris Wingert	6	1	1	0	0	0	7	1
7	(Jamaica)	DF	Lovel Palmer	4	1	1	0	0	0	4	1
2	(United States)	DF	Tony Beltran	4	1	0	0	0	0	4	1
29	(The Gambia)	DF	Abdoulie Mansally	3	1	0	0	0	0	3	1
5	(United States)	MF	Kyle Beckerman	7	0	2	0	1	0	10	0
11	(Argentina)	MF	Javier Morales	5	0	0	0	1	0	6	0
20	(United States)	MF	Ned Grabavoy	5	0	0	0	1	0	6	0
13	(Colombia)	FW	Olmes García	5	0	0	0	0	0	5	0
16	(Mexico)	DF	Carlos Salcedo	3	0	0	0	1	0	4	0
28	(United States)	DF	Chris Schuler	2	0	1	0	0	0	3	0
23	(Jamaica)	MF	Khari Stephenson	2	0	1	0	0	0	3	0
18	(United States)	GK	Nick Rimando	2	0	0	0	1	0	3	0
15	(Costa Rica)	FW	Álvaro Saborío	1	0	2	0	0	0	3	0
21	(United States)	MF	Luis Gil	2	0	0	0	0	0	2	0
49	(United States)	FW	Devon Sandoval	1	0	0	0	1	0	2	0
4	(United States)	DF	Aaron Maund	1	0	0	0	0	0	1	0
8	(United States)	FW	Joao Plata	1	0	0	0	0	0	1	0
3	(United States)	DF	Kwame Watson-Siriboe	1	0	0	0	0	0	1	0
6	(United States)	DF	Nat Borchers	1	0	0	0	0	0	1	0
10	(United States)	FW	Robbie Findley	1	0	0	0	0	0	1	0

== Recognition and awards ==
=== Individual awards ===
==== Weekly awards ====
As of October 29, 2013

Week	Player of the Week	Team of the Week	Save of the Week	Goal of the Week
1		(Costa Rica) Álvaro Saborío		
2		(United States) Kwame Watson-Siriboe		
4			(United States) Nat Borchers	
5		(United States) Luis Gil		
7			(United States) Nick Rimando	
8		(United States) Nick Rimando		(Argentina) Javier Morales
10				(United States) Luis Gil
12			(United States) Nick Rimando	
14		(Argentina) Javier Morales	(United States) Nick Rimando	
15	(Colombia) Olmes García	(Colombia) Olmes García (Argentina) Javier Morales	(United States) Nick Rimando	
17		(United States) Kyle Beckerman (United States) Nat Borchers		
18		(United States) Nick Rimando	(United States) Nick Rimando	(Cuba) Yordany Álvarez
20		(Argentina) Javier Morales	(United States) Jeff Attinella	(Argentina) Javier Morales
21		(United States) Robbie Findley		
22	(Costa Rica) Álvaro Saborío	(Costa Rica) Álvaro Saborío		(Costa Rica) Álvaro Saborío
23		(United States) Nick Rimando	(United States) Nick Rimando	
24		(United States) Ned Grabavoy		
25			(United States) Chris Wingert	
26		(United States) Kyle Beckerman		
27		(Ecuador) Joao Plata (Argentina) Javier Morales		(Argentina) Javier Morales
30			(United States) Nick Rimando	
34		(United States) Nick Rimando	(United States) Nick Rimando	
34			(United States) Nick Rimando	

==== Annual awards ====
As of April 25, 2014

Player	Award
(United States) Nick Rimando	Utah Governor's State of Sport Awards – Highlight of the Year
(United States) Kyle Beckerman	Utah Governor's State of Sport Awards – Professional Male Athlete of the Year

=== Annual awards ===
As of April 25, 2014

Award
Utah Governor's State of Sport Awards – Team of the Year
