= 2014 Real Salt Lake season =

American soccer team season

Real Salt Lake
2014 season
- Owner: Dell Loy Hansen
- Coach: Jeff Cassar
- Stadium: Rio Tinto Stadium
- Major League Soccer: Conference: 3rd Overall: 4th
- MLS Cup: Conference Semifinals
- U.S. Open Cup: 4th Round
- Rocky Mountain Cup: 1st
- Desert Diamond Cup: 3rd
- Highest home attendance: 20,513 (vs New England Revolution, 4 July)
- Lowest home attendance: 18,881 (vs Toronto FC, 29 March)
- Average home league attendance: 20,157
- Biggest win: RSL 5–1 COL (9/19)
- Biggest defeat: SEA 4–0 RSL (5/31)
| Home colors | Away colors |

The 2014 Real Salt Lake season was the team's tenth year of existence and also the first year with new head coach Jeff Cassar. The team's first game was on March 8 at StubHub Center.

== Background ==
In 2013 Real Salt Lake played in the MLS Cup final, losing in the tenth round of penalty kicks to Sporting Kansas City. Real Salt Lake also announced that LifeVantage would be a long-term sponsor beginning in the 2014 Season. Additionally, long term head coach, Jason Kreis announced that he would leave the club at the end of the season to embark on an opportunity to become the first coach for New York City FC to start in the 2015 season. Other changes to the staff including Miles Joseph who left to assist Kreis in New York and C. J. Brown returned to his former club, Chicago Fire Soccer Club, to serve as assistant coach. Jeff Cassar was promoted to be the head coach beginning in the 2014 season.

== Overview ==
=== March ===
Real Salt Lake began the season away to LA Galaxy on 8 April 2014 and won their first match of the season. Nick Rimando was awarded the first week Player of the Week after a nine-save performance helping to secure the win. Additionally, Rimando was voted for MLS Save of the Week and named for MLS Team of the Week along with defender Nat Borchers for week one. Real Salt Lake continued to remain unbeaten throughout the month with draws at San Jose (3–3) and the home opener to LA Galaxy (1–1), and a three-nil home win to Toronto FC which saw Álvaro Saborío, Javier Morales, and Nat Borchers named to the MLS team of the Week for week four. Captain Kyle Beckerman was also awarded MLS Goal of the Week for his 25-yard shot against San Jose that earned him nearly 50 percent of the votes.

=== April ===
RSL continued their unbeaten run through the month with draws away to Sporting Kansas City (0–0) and Philadelphia Union (2–2), and home against Vancouver Whitecaps FC (2–2). Real Salt Lake also had a single home win over Portland Timbers (1–0), to bring the tally to eleven consecutive matches unbeaten against the Timbers. Real Salt Lake also were honored by being awarded the "Team of the Year" in the Utah Governor's State of Sport awards, as well as awards to Kyle Beckerman for "Male Professional Athlete of the Year", and Nick Rimando was awarded for "Highlight of the Year" for their accomplishments in the 2013 season.

Luis Gil was called up to the U-21 US National Team for the pre-Olympic Training Camp, but backed out to recover from a lingering hamstring injury. Defender Carlos Salcedo additionally was called up to train with the Mexico U-21 National Team to prepare for the 2016 Summer Olympics. RSL Arizona Academy graduate Justen Glad was offered a Homegrown Player contract and became the seventh academy graduate to join the first team. Real also announced a new Under-12 Academy to be based in Utah with graduates being promoted to the RSL Arizona Academy.

=== May ===
Real Salt Lake continued their unbeaten run to tie the MLS record for an unbeaten start of the season, tying with 1996 and 2010 LA Galaxy and 2000 Kansas City Wizards. RSL suffered their first defeat the final day of the month when they lost away to Seattle Sounders. Forward Álvaro Saborío was named to the Costa Rica World Cup Roster, and Midfielder Kyle Beckerman and Goalkeeper Nick Rimando were called up to the United States men's national soccer team and departed to train with their respective teams in preparation for the upcoming 2014 FIFA World Cup, although Saborío returned after fracturing his fifth metatarsal in training. Jordan Allen was ruled out for the remainder of the season after undergoing a microfracture surgery to his right knee.

Joao Plata won the MLS Player of the Week for week nine after his two-goal performance against Chicago Fire Soccer Club. Javier Morales scored the second fasted goal in RSL history with his first goal finding the net fifteen seconds into the match. Javi also got his first hat-trick for Real Salt Lake in the team's first ever win away to FC Dallas. In Nick Rimando's absence, Jeff Attinella won the MLS Save of the Week for Week 11 with a double save in the win against Colorado Rapids.

== Competitions ==
=== Preseason ===
==== Matches ====
| January 29, 2014 | RSL Arizona Academy | 1–1 | Real Salt Lake | Casa Grande, AZ, USA |
| | Josh Doughty 80' | Report | Morales 52' (pen.) | Stadium: Grande Sports World |

| February 8, 2014 | UC Irvine Anteaters | 1–1 | Real Salt Lake | Irvine, CA, USA |
| | Iwasa 83' | Report | 15' Mulholland | Stadium: Anteater Stadium |

| February 13, 2014 | Chivas USA | 1–0 | Real Salt Lake | Carson, CA, USA |
| 11:00 PST | Bautista 11' | Report | | Stadium: StubHub Center |

==== Desert Diamond Cup ====
===== Standings =====
| Pos | Team | Pld | W | D | L | GF | GA | GD | Pts |
|---|---|---|---|---|---|---|---|---|---|
| 1 | Chicago Fire | 4 | 3 | 0 | 1 | 6 | 2 | +4 | 9 |
| 2 | Chivas USA | 4 | 1 | 3 | 0 | 5 | 4 | +1 | 6 |
| 3 | Real Salt Lake | 4 | 1 | 2 | 1 | 4 | 3 | +1 | 5 |
| 4 | New England Revolution | 4 | 1 | 2 | 1 | 5 | 5 | 0 | 5 |
| 5 | Colorado Rapids | 4 | 1 | 2 | 1 | 4 | 4 | 0 | 5 |
| 6 | FC Tucson | 3 | 0 | 1 | 2 | 2 | 6 | −4 | 1 (Note: Chivas Rayadas de Guadalajara took the place of FC Tucson in the final match v. Chicago Fire.) |

Updated to match(es) played on unknown. Source:

===== Matches =====
| February 19, 2014 | Real Salt Lake | 0–0 | New England Revolution | Tucson, AZ, USA |
| 18:00 (MST) | | Report | | Stadium: North Stadium, Kino Veterans Memorial Stadium; Referee: Baldomero Toledo |

| February 22, 2014 | Colorado Rapids | 1–0 | Real Salt Lake | Tucson, Arizona |
| 15:30 (MST) | Brown 69' | report | Wingert (yellow card) 30' | Stadium: Kino Stadium; Referee: Kevin Stott |

| February 26, 2014 | Real Salt Lake | 3–1 | FC Tucson | Tucson, AZ, USA |
| 18:00 (MST) | Saborío 24'; Maund 44'; Saborío 45' | report | Acosta (yellow card) 44'; Antoniak 59' | Stadium: North Stadium, Kino Veterans Memorial Stadium; Referee: Ricardo Salazar |

| March 1, 2014 | Real Salt Lake | 1–1 | CD Chivas USA | Tucson, AZ, USA |
| 13:00 (MST) | Saborío 70' | report | Torres 10'; Minda (yellow card) 14'; Bautista (yellow card) 81' | Stadium: Kino Veterans Memorial Stadium; Referee: Ismail Elfath |

=== MLS regular season ===
==== Standings ====
===== Western Conference =====
| Pos | Team | Pld | W | L | T | GF | GA | GD | Pts | Qualification |
|---|---|---|---|---|---|---|---|---|---|---|
| 1 | Seattle Sounders FC | 34 | 20 | 10 | 4 | 65 | 50 | +15 | 64 | Qualification for the conference semifinals |
| 2 | LA Galaxy | 34 | 17 | 7 | 10 | 69 | 37 | +32 | 61 | Qualification for the conference semifinals |
| 3 | Real Salt Lake | 34 | 15 | 8 | 11 | 54 | 39 | +15 | 56 | Qualification for the conference semifinals |
| 4 | FC Dallas | 34 | 16 | 12 | 6 | 55 | 45 | +10 | 54 | Qualification for the knockout round |
| 5 | Vancouver Whitecaps FC | 34 | 12 | 8 | 14 | 42 | 40 | +2 | 50 | Qualification for the knockout round |
| 6 | Portland Timbers | 34 | 12 | 9 | 13 | 61 | 52 | +9 | 49 | |
| 7 | Chivas USA | 34 | 9 | 19 | 6 | 29 | 61 | −32 | 33 | |
| 8 | Colorado Rapids | 34 | 8 | 18 | 8 | 43 | 62 | −19 | 32 | |
| 9 | San Jose Earthquakes | 34 | 6 | 16 | 12 | 35 | 50 | −15 | 30 | |

Source: MLS

===== Overall table =====
Note: the table below has no impact on playoff qualification and is used solely for determining host of the MLS Cup, certain CCL spots, and 2015 MLS draft. The conference tables are the sole determinant for teams qualifying to the playoffs

| Pos | Team | Pld | W | L | T | GF | GA | GD | Pts | Qualification |
|---|---|---|---|---|---|---|---|---|---|---|
| 1 | Seattle Sounders FC (S, U) | 34 | 20 | 10 | 4 | 65 | 50 | +15 | 64 | Qualification for the CONCACAF Champions League |
| 2 | LA Galaxy (C) | 34 | 17 | 7 | 10 | 69 | 37 | +32 | 61 | Qualification for the CONCACAF Champions League |
| 3 | D.C. United | 34 | 17 | 9 | 8 | 52 | 37 | +15 | 59 | Qualification for the CONCACAF Champions League |
| 4 | Real Salt Lake | 34 | 15 | 8 | 11 | 54 | 39 | +15 | 56 | Qualification for the CONCACAF Champions League |
| 5 | New England Revolution | 34 | 17 | 13 | 4 | 51 | 46 | +5 | 55 | |
| 6 | FC Dallas | 34 | 16 | 12 | 6 | 55 | 45 | +10 | 54 | |
| 7 | Columbus Crew | 34 | 14 | 10 | 10 | 52 | 42 | +10 | 52 | |
| 8 | New York Red Bulls | 34 | 13 | 10 | 11 | 55 | 50 | +5 | 50 | |
| 9 | Vancouver Whitecaps FC | 34 | 12 | 8 | 14 | 42 | 40 | +2 | 50 | Qualification for the CONCACAF Champions League |
| 10 | Sporting Kansas City | 34 | 14 | 13 | 7 | 48 | 41 | +7 | 49 | |
| 11 | Portland Timbers | 34 | 12 | 9 | 13 | 61 | 52 | +9 | 49 | |
| 12 | Philadelphia Union | 34 | 10 | 12 | 12 | 51 | 51 | 0 | 42 | |
| 13 | Toronto FC | 34 | 11 | 15 | 8 | 44 | 54 | −10 | 41 | |
| 14 | Houston Dynamo | 34 | 11 | 17 | 6 | 39 | 58 | −19 | 39 | |
| 15 | Chicago Fire | 34 | 6 | 10 | 18 | 41 | 51 | −10 | 36 | |
| 16 | Chivas USA | 34 | 9 | 19 | 6 | 29 | 61 | −32 | 33 | |
| 17 | Colorado Rapids | 34 | 8 | 18 | 8 | 43 | 62 | −19 | 32 | |
| 18 | San Jose Earthquakes | 34 | 6 | 16 | 12 | 35 | 50 | −15 | 30 | |
| 19 | Montreal Impact (V) | 34 | 6 | 18 | 10 | 38 | 58 | −20 | 28 | |

Source: MLS
Rules for classification: 1) points; 2) head-to-head record; 3) goal difference; 4) number of goals scored
(C) MLS Cup champions; (S) Supporters' Shield winners; (U) U.S. Open Cup winners; (V) Canadian Championship winners

==== Results summary ====
| Overall | | | | | | | | Home | | | | | | Away | | | | | |
| Pld | Pts | W | L | T | GF | GA | GD | W | L | T | GF | GA | GD | W | L | T | GF | GA | GD |
|---|---|---|---|---|---|---|---|---|---|---|---|---|---|---|---|---|---|---|---|
| 31 | 49 | 13 | 8 | 10 | 50 | 39 | +11 | 9 | 1 | 5 | 29 | 14 | +15 | 4 | 7 | 5 | 21 | 25 | −4 |

Last updated: October 5, 2014
Source: MLS Results
Pld = Matches played; Pts = Points; W = Matches won; T = Matches tied; L = Matches lost; GF = Goals for; GA = Goals against; GD = Goal difference

==== Results by round ====
| Round | 1 | 2 | 3 | 4 | 5 | 6 | 7 | 8 | 9 | 10 | 11 | 12 | 13 | 14 | 15 | 16 | 17 | 18 | 19 | 20 | 21 | 22 | 23 | 24 | 25 | 26 | 27 | 28 | 29 | 30 | 31 | 32 | 33 | 34 |
|---|---|---|---|---|---|---|---|---|---|---|---|---|---|---|---|---|---|---|---|---|---|---|---|---|---|---|---|---|---|---|---|---|---|---|
| Ground | A | A | H | H | A | A | H | H | A | A | H | H | A | A | H | A | H | A | H | H | H | A | H | H | A | A | H | A | H | A | A | H | A | H |
| Result | W | D | D | W | D | D | W | D | W | W | W | D | L | D | L | L | W | L | D | W | D | W | W | W | L | D | W | L | W | L | L | | | |
| West | 4 | 4 | 4 | 2 | 2 | 4 | 3 | 3 | 2 | 2 | 2 | 2 | 2 | 2 | 2 | 3 | 2 | 2 | 3 | 2 | 2 | 2 | 2 | 1 | 3 | 3 | 3 | 3 | 3 | 3 | 3 | | | |
| Overall | 6 | 5 | 7 | 3 | 4 | 4 | 3 | 3 | 2 | 2 | 2 | 2 | 2 | 2 | 2 | 5 | 3 | 5 | 5 | 3 | 3 | 3 | 3 | 2 | 5 | 4 | 4 | 4 | 3 | 4 | 4 | | | |

Updated to match(es) played on October 5, 2014. Source: RealSaltLake.com
A = Away; H = Home; W = Win; D = Draw; L = Loss

==== Match results ====
As of May 4, 2014

| March 8, 2014 1 | Los Angeles Galaxy | 0–1 | Real Salt Lake | Carson, CA |
| 7:30 PM PST | Riley (yellow card) 45' | report | Morales (yellow card) 35'; Mulholland (yellow card) 79'; Plata 80'; Saborío (yellow card) 87'; Rimando (yellow card) 90' | Stadium: StubHub Center; Attendance: 25,634; Referee: Javier Santos |

| March 15, 2014 2 | San Jose Earthquakes | 3–3 | Real Salt Lake | Santa Clara, CA |
| 7:30 PM PDT | Wondolowski 6'; Lenhart (yellow card) 9'; Bernárdez 75'; Koval (yellow card) 77'; Salinas (yellow card) 90'; Bernárdez 90+5' | report | Beckerman 11'; Plata 32'; Mulholland 45+4'; Borchers (yellow card) 52' | Stadium: Buck Shaw Stadium; Attendance: 10525; Referee: Jorge Luna |

| March 22, 2014 3 | Real Salt Lake | 1–1 | Los Angeles Galaxy | Sandy, UT |
| 2:00 PM MDT | Saborío 19'; Morales (yellow card) 55'; Saborío (yellow card) 63' | report | Ishizaki (yellow card) 18'; Keane 34' | Stadium: Rio Tinto Stadium; Attendance: 20,466; Referee: Ismael Eltath |

| March 29, 2014 4 | Real Salt Lake | 3–0 | Toronto FC | Sandy, UT |
| 7:30 PM MDT | Saborío (pen) 11'; Gil 28'; Schuler (yellow card) 38'; Saborío 55' | report | Defoe (yellow card) 29'; Henry (yellow card) 31'; Caldwell (yellow card) 35' | Stadium: Rio Tinto Stadium; Attendance: 18,881; Referee: Baldomero Toledo |

| April 5, 2014 5 | Sporting Kansas City | 0–0 | Real Salt Lake | Kansas City, KS |
| 7:30 PM CDT | Myers (yellow card) 76'; Rosell (red card) 83'; Bieler (yellow card) 90+1' | report | Schuler (yellow card) 40'; Borchers (yellow card) 87' | Stadium: Sporting Park; Attendance: 19,838; Referee: Armando Villarreal |

| April 12, 2014 6 | Philadelphia Union | 2–2 | Real Salt Lake | Chester, PA |
| TBD | Wenger 55'; Edu 90' | report | Mulholland 6'; Beckerman 85' | Stadium: PPL Park; Attendance: 18,015; Referee: Alan Kelly |

| April 19, 2014 7 | Real Salt Lake | 1–0 | Portland Timbers | Sandy, Ut |
| 7:30 PM MDT | Grabavoy 79' | report | Danso (yellow card) 33' | Stadium: Rio Tinto Stadium; Attendance: 20,496; Referee: Drew Fischer |

| April 26, 2014 8 | Real Salt Lake | 2–2 | Vancouver Whitecaps FC | Sandy, UT |
| 7:30 PM MDT | Plata 2'; Saborío 9'; Wingert (yellow card) 65' | report | Manneh (yellow card) 58'; Mezquida 86'; Fernández 90+4'; Leverón (yellow card) 90+5' | Stadium: Rio Tinto Stadium; Attendance: 19,661; Referee: Kevin Stott |

| May 3, 2014 9 | Chicago Fire | 2–3 | Real Salt Lake | Bridgeview, IL |
| 7:30 PM DDT | Magee 22'; Anangonó 30'; Magee (yellow card) 63' | report | Schuler (yellow card) 30'; Beckerman (yellow card) 44'; Plata 72'; Saborío 90'; Plata 90+3' | Stadium: Real Salt Lake; Attendance: 14,903; Referee: Juan Guzman |

| May 11, 2014 10 | Houston Dynamo | 2–5 | Real Salt Lake | Houston, TX |
| 6:00 PM MDT | Sherrod 22'; Carrasco (red card) 27'; Óscar Boniek García (yellow card) 45+4'; Sherrod 56'; Sherrod (yellow card) 90+2' | report | Morales 1'; Morales 17'; Saborío (yellow card) 26'; Saborío 32'; Mulholland 78'; Morales 89' | Stadium: BBVA Compass Stadium; Attendance: 16,514; Referee: Allen Chapman |

| May 17, 2014 11 (RMC) | Real Salt Lake | 2–1 | Colorado Rapids | Sandy, UT |
| 7:30 PM MDT | Plata 24'; Grossman (yellow card) 33'; Mulholland (yellow card) 44'; Morales 51'; Morales (yellow card) 64'; Stertzer (yellow card) 90+3' | report | Drew Moor 83' | Stadium: Rio Tinto Stadium; Attendance: 20,489; Referee: Mark Geiger |

| May 24, 2014 12 | Real Salt Lake | 0–0 | FC Dallas | Sandy, UT |
| 7:30 PM EDT | Beltran (yellow card) 61'; Morales (yellow card) 85' | report | Ulloa (yellow card) 66'; Hedges (yellow card) 80'; Castillo (yellow card) 83' | Stadium: Rio Tinto Stadium; Attendance: 20,488; Referee: Hilario Grajeda |

| May 31, 2014 13 | Seattle Sounders FC | 4–0 | Real Salt Lake | Seattle, WA |
| 3:00 PM PDT | Pineda 42'; Pappa 55'; Barrett 62'; Evans (yellow card) 80'; Martins 90' | report | Beltran (yellow card) 43'; Borchers (yellow card) 76' | Stadium: CenturyLink Field; Attendance: 39,245; Referee: Ricardo Salazar |

| June 4, 2014 14 | Columbus Crew | 1–1 | Real Salt Lake | Columbus, OH |
| 19:30 EDT | Gehrig (yellow card) 16'; Finlay 88' | report | Gil 56' | Stadium: Columbus Crew Stadium; Attendance: 11.121; Referee: Baldomero Toledo |

| June 7, 2014 15 | Real Salt Lake | 1–3 | Portland Timbers | Sandy, UT |
| 8:00 PM MDT | Mulholland 23'; Beltran (yellow card) 52' (yellow-red card) 53'; García (yellow card) 70'; Mulholland (yellow card) 84' | report | Adi 36'; Adi 45'; Johnson 73'; Chará (yellow card) 90' | Stadium: Rio Tinto Stadium; Attendance: 20,480; Referee: Ismail Elfath |

| June 28, 2014 16 | C.D. Chivas USA | 1–0 | Real Salt Lake | Carson, CA |
| 7:30 PM MDT | Mulholland (red card); Stertzer (yellow card) 72' | report | Lochhead (yellow card) 19'; Torres 35'; Rosales (yellow card) 47'; Toia (yellow card) 50' | Stadium: StubHub Center; Attendance: 5,689; Referee: Kevin Stott |

| July 4, 2014 17 | Real Salt Lake | 2–1 | New England Revolution | Sandy, UT |
| 20:00 MDT | Wingert (yellow card) 19'; Morales 35'; Morales (yellow card) 36'; Plata 65' | report | Nguyen (yellow card) 32'; Barnes 37'; Tierney (yellow card) 64' | Stadium: Rio Tinto Stadium; Attendance: 20,513; Referee: Allen Chapman |

| July 12, 2014 18 | Los Angeles Galaxy | 1–0 | Real Salt Lake | Carson, CA |
| 7:30 PM PDT | García (yellow card) 90+4'; Rimando (yellow card) 90+7' | report | Zardes 20'; Sarvas (yellow card) 90+4' | Stadium: StubHub Center; Attendance: 19,882; Referee: Sylviu Petrescu |

| July 19, 2014 19 | Real Salt Lake | 1–1 | Vancouver Whitecaps FC | Sandy, UT |
| 8:00 PM MDT | Beckerman (yellow card) 17'; Beltran (yellow card) 76'; Plata 81'; Wingert (yellow card) 90+7' | report | Mattocks 73'; Fernández (yellow card) 75'; Laba (yellow card) 75'; Ousted (yellow card) 76'; Koffie (yellow card) 88' | Stadium: Rio Tinto Stadium; Attendance: 20,265; Referee: Edvin Juresevic |

| July 24, 2014 20 | Real Salt Lake | 3–1 | Montreal Impact | Sandy, UT |
| 8:00 PM MDT | Mulholland 3'; Wingert (yellow card) 18'; García 70' 90+2' | Summary | Camara 32'; Nakajima-Farran (red card) 65'; Gagnon-Laparé (yellow card) 83' | Stadium: Rio Tinto Stadium; Attendance: 20,398; Referee: (Canada) Drew Fischer |

| July 30, 2014 21 | Real Salt Lake | 1–1 | New York Red Bulls | Sandy, UT |
| 7:00 PM MDT | Plata 19'; García (yellow card) 79' | Summary | Henry 57' | Stadium: Rio Tinto Stadium; Attendance: 20,295; Referee: (United States) Mark Geiger |

| August 2, 2014 22 (RMC) | Colorado Rapids | 0–1 | Real Salt Lake | Commerce City, CO |
| 8:00 PM MDT | | Summary | Morales 14'; Wingert (yellow card) 34'; Maund (red card) 47'; Beckerman (yellow card) 62'; Beltran (yellow card) 84' | Stadium: Dick's Sporting Goods Park; Attendance: 17,554; Referee: (United States) Baldomero Toledo |

| August 9, 2014 23 | Real Salt Lake | 3–0 | D.C. United | Sandy, UT |
| 8:00 PM MDT | Plata 11'; Schuler 13' 24'; Mansally (yellow card) 85' | Summary | Jeffrey (yellow card) 5'; Johnson (yellow card) 30' | Stadium: Rio Tinto Stadium; Attendance: 20,452; Referee: (United States) Hilario Grajeda |

| August 16, 2014 24 | Real Salt Lake | 2–1 | Seattle Sounders FC | Sandy, UT |
| 12:30 PM MDT | García (yellow card) 14'; Plata 53'; Mulholland 57' | Report | Scott (yellow card) 15'; Yedlin (yellow card) 60'; Barrett 72' | Stadium: Rio Tinto Stadium; Attendance: 20.483; Referee: Sylviu Petrescu |

| August 22, 2014 25 | FC Dallas | 2–1 | Real Salt Lake | Frisco, TX |
| 8:00 PM DDT | Pérez (yellow card) 31' (yellow-red card) 45'; Michel (yellow card) 33'; Watson 50'; Castillo 74' | report | Schuler (yellow card) 45'; García 90+1' | Stadium: Toyota Stadium; Attendance: 17,622; Referee: Ismail Elfath |

| August 30, 2014 26 | San Jose Earthquakes | 1–1 | Real Salt Lake | Santa Clara, CA |
| 5:30 PM PDT | Cronin 14'; Pierazzi (yellow card) 61'; Hernandez (yellow card) 68' | report | Morales 36' | Stadium: Buck Shaw Stadium; Attendance: 10,525; Referee: David Gantar |

| September 6, 2014 27 | Real Salt Lake | 2–1 | FC Dallas | Sandy, UT |
| 8:00 PM MDT | Findley 31'; Saborío 77'; Beltran (yellow card) 85' | report | Loyd (yellow card) 54'; Michel 62' | Stadium: Rio Tinto Stadium; Attendance: 20,545; Referee: Armando Villareal |

| September 12, 2014 28 | Seattle Sounders FC | 3–2 | Real Salt Lake | Seattle, WA |
| 7:30 PM PDT | Neagle (yellow card) 25'; Neagle 28'; Martins 43'; Rose 90+4' | report | Morales 30'; Plata 50'; Borchers (red card) 68'; Wingert (yellow card) 71' | Stadium: CenturyLink Field; Attendance: 38,976; Referee: Kevin Stott |

| September 19, 2014 29 (RMC) | Real Salt Lake | 5–1 | Colorado Rapids | Sandy, UT |
| 8:00 PM MDT | Plata 32'; Morales 33'; Schuler 37'; Nasco 45' (o.g.); Salcedo 63' | report | José Mari 21'; O'Neill (yellow card) 36'; Serna (yellow card) 84'; Burch (yellow card) 88' | Stadium: Rio Tinto Stadium; Attendance: 20,692; Referee: Ricardo Salazar |

| September 27, 2014 30 | Vancouver Whitecaps FC | 2–1 | Real Salt Lake | Vancouver, BC |
| 4:00 PM PDT | Beitashour (yellow card) 36'; Morales 62' (pen.) 78' (yellow card) 79'; Teibert (yellow card) 64' | Summary | Borchers 57'; Salcedo (yellow card) 60' | Stadium: BC Place; Attendance: 19,395; Referee: (United States) Allen Chapman |

| October 5, 2104 31 | C.D. Chivas USA | 1–0 | Real Salt Lake | Carson, CA |
| 6:00 PM PDT | Minda (yellow card) 22'; Borja 47'; Sturgis (yellow card) 82' | Summary | Mulholland (yellow card) 78'; Morales (yellow card) 85' | Stadium: StubHub Center; Attendance: 12,271; Referee: (Canada) Dave Gantar |

| October 11, 2014 32 | Real Salt Lake | 2–0 | San Jose Earthquakes | Sandy, UT |
| 7:30 PM MDT | Grabavoy 24' (yellow card) 81'; Velásquez 29' | Report | Yannick Djaló (yellow card) 32'; Harden (yellow card) 74' | Stadium: Rio Tinto Stadium; Attendance: 20,701; Referee: (United States) Jose Rivero |

| October 17, 2014 33 | Portland Timbers | 0–0 | Real Salt Lake | Portland, OR |
| 7:00 PM PDT | Valeri (yellow card) 55'; Ridgewell (yellow card) 58'; Paparatto (yellow card) 90+2' | Report | Beckerman (yellow card) 55' | Stadium: Jeld-Wen Field; Attendance: 20,814; Referee: (United States) Geiger |

| October 22, 2014 34 | Real Salt Lake | 2–0 | C.D. Chivas USA | Sandy, UT |
| 7:30 PM MDT | Saborío 36' (pen.); Salcedo (yellow card) 59'; Beckerman 74'; Grabavoy (yellow card) 85' | Report | Toia (yellow card) 31'; Burling (yellow card) 50'; Chávez (red card) 56'; Reo-Coker (yellow card) 76' | Stadium: Rio Tinto Stadium; Attendance: 20,665; Referee: (United States) Bazakos |

Legend:: Win Draw Loss
Schedule Updated: February 2, 2014
Source: Real Salt Lake Schedule

=== MLS Cup Playoffs ===
==== Western Conference Semifinal ====
| November 1 First leg | Real Salt Lake | 0–0 | LA Galaxy | Sandy, Utah |
| 17:00 PDT | Beltran (yellow card) 63'; Wingert (yellow card) 67' | Report | Gonzalez (yellow card) 53'; Rogers (yellow card) 77' | Stadium: Rio Tinto Stadium; Attendance: 20,713; Referee: Silviu Petrescu |

| November 9 Second leg | LA Galaxy | 5–0 (5–0 agg.) | Real Salt Lake | Carson, California |
| 16:30 PST | Donovan 10', 54', 72', (yellow card) 81'; Keane 20'; Sarvas 63' | Report | Saborío (yellow card) 79'; Beltran (yellow card) 86' | Stadium: StubHub Center; Attendance: 27,000; Referee: Jair Marrufo |

=== U.S. Open Cup ===
Kickoff times are in MDT

| 14 June 2014 Fourth round | Atlanta Silverbacks | 2–1 | Real Salt Lake | Chamblee, Georgia |
| 6:00 PM MDT | Burgos 33' (yellow card) 55'; Gavin (yellow card) 44'; Poku 90+2' | Report | Findley 10'; Maund (yellow card) 27'; Salcedo (yellow card) 65' | Stadium: Silverbacks Park; Attendance: 5,000; Referee: A. Villarreal |

=== Friendlies ===
| 12 August 2014 Friendly | Real Salt Lake (United States) | 1–1 | (Mexico) Club Tijuana | Sandy, Utah |
| 8:00 PM MDT | Beltran (yellow card) 21'; Salcedo (yellow card) 85'; Gil 87' | Report | Requejo (yellow card) 7'; Castro (yellow card) 11'; Ortíz (yellow card) 59'; Villegas 77' | Stadium: Rio Tinto Stadium; Attendance: 13,222; Referee: Robert Sibiga |

| 30 September 2014 Friendly | Real Salt Lake | 2–0 | Sacramento Republic FC | Sandy, Utah |
| 7:30 PM MDT | Findley 57' (pen.); Velásquez 90' | Report | Lopez (yellow card) 27'; Alvarez (yellow card) 45'; Mirković (yellow card) 54' | Stadium: Rio Tinto Stadium; Attendance: 20,555 |

== Club ==
=== Roster ===
As of April 8, 2014. Age calculated as of the start of the 2014 season.

| No. | Position | Player | Nation | Age | Acquired |
|---|---|---|---|---|---|
| 1 | GK | Lalo Fernández (HGP) | Mexico | 21 | February 24, 2012 |
| 2 | DF | Tony Beltran | United States | 26 | January 18, 2008 |
| 3 | DF | Kwame Watson-Siriboe | United States | 27 | June 27, 2012 |
| 4 | DF | Aaron Maund | United States | 23 | December 3, 2012 |
| 5 | MF | Kyle Beckerman (C) | United States | 31 | July 16, 2007 |
| 6 | DF | Nat Borchers | United States | 32 | February 14, 2008 |
| 7 | MF | Jordan Allen (HGP) | United States | 18 | December 13, 2013 |
| 8 | FW | Joao Plata | Ecuador | 22 | January 30, 2013 |
| 10 | FW | Robbie Findley | United States | 28 | January 16, 2013 |
| 11 | MF | Javier Morales (DP) | Argentina | 34 | August 17, 2007 |
| 12 | MF | Cole Grossman | United States | 24 | November 12, 2012 |
| 13 | FW | Olmes García | Colombia | 21 | February 21, 2013 |
| 14 | DF | Justen Glad (HGP) | United States | 17 | April 4, 2014 |
| 15 | FW | Álvaro Saborío (DP) | Costa Rica | 31 | March 15, 2010 |
| 16 | DF | Carlos Salcedo (HGP) | Mexico | 20 | January 15, 2013 |
| 17 | DF | Chris Wingert | United States | 31 | July 13, 2007 |
| 18 | GK | Nick Rimando | United States | 34 | February 23, 2007 |
| 19 | MF | Luke Mulholland | England | 25 | January 21, 2014 |
| 20 | MF | Ned Grabavoy | United States | 30 | March 3, 2009 |
| 21 | MF | Luis Gil (GA) | United States | 20 | February 23, 2010 |
| 22 | FW | Benji Lopez (HGP) | United States | 19 | July 17, 2013 |
| 23 | FW | Sebastián Jaime | Argentina | 27 | August 8, 2014 |
| 24 | GK | Jeff Attinella | United States | 25 | December 23, 2012 |
| 25 | DF | Rich Balchan | United States | 25 | March 2, 2013 |
| 26 | MF | Sebastián Velásquez | Colombia | 23 | January 12, 2012 |
| 27 | MF | John Stertzer | United States | 23 | January 17, 2013 |
| 28 | DF | Chris Schuler | United States | 26 | January 14, 2010 |
| 29 | DF | Abdoulie Mansally | Gambia | 25 | June 20, 2012 |
| 49 | FW | Devon Sandoval | United States | 22 | January 17, 2013 |

=== Transfers ===
==== In ====
| # | Position | Player | Previous club | Fees/Notes | Date | Source |
|---|---|---|---|---|---|---|
| 7 | MF | (United States) Jordan Allen | (United States) Real Salt Lake – Arizona Academy | Graduate, Home Grown Player | 31 December 2013 | |
| 19 | MF | (England) Luke Mullholland | (United States) Tampa Bay Rowdies | Undisclosed | 21 January 2014 | |
| 23 | DF | (United States) Ryan Neil | (United States) California Golden Bears | First round MLS SuperDraft Pick (18th overall) | 16 January 2014 | |
| | MF | (United States) Joey Dillon | (United States) Georgetown Hoyas | Third round MLS SuperDraft Pick (53rd overall) | 21 January 2014 | |
| | DF | (United States) Daniel Jackson | (United States) Coker College | Fourth round MLS SuperDraft Pick (70th overall) | 21 January 2014 | |
| 14 | DF | (United States) Justen Glad | (United States) Real Salt Lake – Arizona Academy | Home Grown Player | 8 April 2014 | |
| 23 | FW | (Argentina) Sebastián Jaime | (Chile) Unión Española | Undisclosed | 8 August 2014 | |

==== Out ====
| # | Position | Player | Next Club | Fees/Notes | Date | Source |
|---|---|---|---|---|---|---|
| 7 | MF | (Jamaica) Lovel Palmer | (United States) Chicago Fire | Traded for Allocation Money | 13 December 2013 | |
| 23 | MF | (Jamaica) Khari Stephenson | (United States) San Jose Earthquakes | Released to MLS Re-Entry Draft | 9 December 2013 | |
| 23 | DF | (United States) Ryan Neil | (United States) San Jose Earthquakes | Not signed after being picked in the MLS Superdraft | 7 March 2014 | |
| 44 | DF | (United States) Brandon McDonald | (Sweden) Ljungskile SK | Released to MLS Re-Entry Draft | 9 December 2013 | |
| 45 | GK | (Puerto Rico) Josh Saunders | | Released to MLS Re-Entry Draft | 9 December 2013 | |
| 19 | MF | (Uruguay) Enzo Martinez | (United States) Carolina RailHawks | Waived | 9 January 2014 | |
| | DF | (United States) Daniel Jackson | (United States) Carolina RailHawks | Not signed after being picked in the MLS Superdraft | 12 March 2014 | |
| | MF | (United States) Joey Dillon | (United States) Arizona United | Released | 8 April 2014 | |
| 3 | DF | (United States) Kwame Watson-Siriboe | (United States) New York City FC | Trade for 2016 MLS 4th Round Super-Draft Pick | 11 August 2014 | |

=== Loans ===
==== In ====
| # | Position | Player | Loaned To | Fees/Notes | Date | Source |

==== Out ====
| # | Position | Player | Loaned To | Fees/Notes | Date | Source |
|---|---|---|---|---|---|---|
| 14 | MF | (Cuba) Yordany Álvarez | (United States) Orlando City | Loaned for 2014 season and Trade for 2015 for 2017 4th Round Super-Draft Pick | 13 December 2013 | |
| 25 | DF | (United States) Rich Balchan | (United States) Carolina RailHawks | Short-term loan to regain fitness | 7 May 2014 – 12 May 2014 | |
| 3 | DF | (United States) Kwame Watson-Siriboe | (United States) Orange County Blues FC | Short-term loan to regain fitness. | 11 May 2014 | |
| 22 | FW | (United States) Benji Lopez | (United States) Arizona United SC | Loaned for 2014 USL PRO season | 30 May 2014 | |

Note: Kwame Watson-Siriboe and Benji Lopez have both played matches with RSL Reserves while on loan away from Real Salt Lake

=== Coaching and technical staff ===
| Position | Staff |
|---|---|
| General Manager | (United States) Garth Lagerwey |
| Head Coach | (United States) Jeff Cassar |
| Assistant Coach | (Jamaica) Andy Williams |
| Assistant Coach | (United States) Craig Waibel |
| Assistant Coach | (Scotland) Paul Dalglish; Departed: 4 August 2014 |
| Assistant Coach | (United States) Ted Eck |
| Goalkeeping Coach | (United States) Daryl Shore |
| Strength and Conditioning Coach | (United States) Dan Barlow |
| Head Athletic Trainer | (United States) Tyson Pace |
| Assistant Athletic Trainer | (United States) Kevin Christen |
| Director of Soccer Operations | (United States) Eliott Fall |
| Team Administrator | (Mexico) Salvador Pérez |

Last updated: 21 September 2014
Source: Real Salt Lake

=== Kits ===
| Home | Away |

| Type | Shirt | Shorts | Socks | First appearance / Info |
|---|---|---|---|---|
| Home | Claret with Gold Bar / Cobalt sleeves | Claret | Claret | 8 March at LA Galaxy |
| Away | White / Cobalt right sleeve | White | White | 15 March at San Jose Earthquakes |

== Statistics ==
=== Appearances and goals ===
As of May 12, 2014

| No. | Pos | Nat | Player | Total | | MLS | | MLS Cup | | U.S. Open Cup | |
| No. | Pos | Nat | Player | Apps | Goals | Apps | Goals | Apps | Goals | Apps | Goals |
|---|---|---|---|---|---|---|---|---|---|---|---|
| 2 | DF | (United States) USA | Tony Beltran | 18 | 0 | 16+1 | 0 | 0 | 0 | 1 | 0 |
| 4 | DF | (United States) USA | Aaron Maund | 5 | 0 | 4 | 0 | 0 | 0 | 1 | 0 |
| 5 | MF | (United States) USA | Kyle Beckerman | 13 | 2 | 13 | 2 | 0 | 0 | 0 | 0 |
| 6 | DF | (United States) USA | Nat Borchers | 18 | 0 | 18 | 0 | 0 | 0 | 0 | 0 |
| 7 | MF | (United States) USA | Jordan Allen | 2 | 0 | 0+2 | 0 | 0 | 0 | 0 | 0 |
| 8 | FW | (Ecuador) ECU | Joao Plata | 15 | 8 | 13+1 | 8 | 0 | 0 | 0+1 | 0 |
| 10 | FW | (United States) USA | Robbie Findley | 4 | 1 | 1+2 | 0 | 0 | 0 | 1 | 1 |
| 11 | MF | (Argentina) ARG | Javier Morales | 18 | 5 | 18 | 5 | 0 | 0 | 0 | 0 |
| 12 | MF | (United States) USA | Cole Grossman | 11 | 0 | 5+5 | 0 | 0 | 0 | 1 | 0 |
| 13 | FW | (Colombia) COL | Olmes García | 15 | 0 | 7+7 | 0 | 0 | 0 | 0+1 | 0 |
| 15 | FW | (Costa Rica) CRC | Álvaro Saborío | 10 | 6 | 10 | 6 | 0 | 0 | 0 | 0 |
| 16 | DF | (United States) USA | Carlos Salcedo | 3 | 0 | 1+1 | 0 | 0 | 0 | 1 | 0 |
| 17 | DF | (United States) USA | Chris Wingert | 18 | 0 | 17 | 0 | 0 | 0 | 1 | 0 |
| 18 | GK | (United States) USA | Nick Rimando | 11 | 0 | 11 | 0 | 0 | 0 | 0 | 0 |
| 19 | MF | (England) ENG | Luke Mulholland | 19 | 4 | 11+7 | 4 | 0 | 0 | 1 | 0 |
| 20 | MF | (United States) USA | Ned Grabavoy | 18 | 1 | 16+2 | 1 | 0 | 0 | 0 | 0 |
| 21 | MF | (United States) USA | Luis Gil | 15 | 2 | 11+3 | 2 | 0 | 0 | 1 | 0 |
| 26 | MF | (Colombia) COL | Sebastián Velásquez | 7 | 0 | 0+6 | 0 | 0 | 0 | 0+1 | 0 |
| 28 | DF | (United States) USA | Chris Schuler | 14 | 0 | 14 | 0 | 0 | 0 | 0 | 0 |
| 24 | GK | (United States) USA | Jeff Attinella | 9 | 0 | 8 | 0 | 0 | 0 | 1 | 0 |
| 25 | DF | (United States) USA | Rich Balchan | 3 | 0 | 2+1 | 0 | 0 | 0 | 0 | 0 |
| 27 | MF | (United States) USA | John Stertzer | 8 | 0 | 3+4 | 0 | 0 | 0 | 1 | 0 |
| 29 | DF | (The Gambia) GAM | Abdoulie Mansally | 8 | 0 | 3+5 | 0 | 0 | 0 | 0 | 0 |
| 49 | FW | (United States) USA | Devon Sandoval | 14 | 0 | 6+7 | 0 | 0 | 0 | 1 | 0 |

Source: Real Salt Lake Statistics

=== Individual awards ===
The MLS Player of the Week, Month, and Year is awarded by the North American Soccer Reporters (NASR) and decided by vote.

==== Weekly awards ====
As of July 9, 2014

| Week | Player of the Week | Team of the Week | Save of the Week | Goal of the Week |
| 1 | (United States) Nick Rimando | (United States) Nick Rimando (United States) Nat Borchers | (United States) Nick Rimando | |
| 2 | | | (United States) Nick Rimando | (United States) Kyle Beckerman |
| 4 | | (Costa Rica) Álvaro Saborío (United States) Javier Morales (United States) Nat Borchers (United States) Jeff Cassar (coach) | | |
| 5 | | (United States) Jeff Attinella (United States) Chris Schuler | | |
| 6 | | (Argentina) Javier Morales | | |
| 7 | (United States) Nick Rimando | (United States) Nick Rimando (United States) Ned Grabavoy | | |
| 9 | (Colombia) Joao Plata | (Colombia) Joao Plata | | |
| 10 | | (Argentina) Javier Morales | | (Argentina) Javier Morales |
| 11 | | (United States) Devon Sandoval | (United States) Jeff Attinella | |
| 12 | | (United States) Tony Beltran | | |
| 13 | | | (United States) Jeff Attinella | |
| 17 | | (United States) Kyle Beckerman | | |

=== Top scorers ===
As of July 9, 2014

| Place | Number | Name | MLS | MLS Cup | U.S. Open Cup | Total |
|---|---|---|---|---|---|---|
| 1 | 8 | (Ecuador) Joao Plata | 8 | 0 | 0 | 8 |
| 2 | 15 | (Costa Rica) Álvaro Saborío | 6 | 0 | 0 | 6 |
| 3 | 11 | (Argentina) Javier Morales | 4 | 0 | 0 | 4 |
| 3 | 19 | (England) Luke Mulholland | 4 | 0 | 0 | 4 |
| 5 | 5 | (United States) Kyle Beckerman | 2 | 0 | 0 | 2 |
| 5 | 21 | (United States) Luis Gil | 2 | 0 | 0 | 2 |
| 6 | 20 | (United States) Ned Grabavoy | 1 | 0 | 0 | 1 |
| 7 | 10 | (United States) Robbie Findley | 0 | 0 | 1 | 1 |
| TOTALS | | | 24 | 0 | 0 | 24 |

=== Top assists ===
As of May 12, 2014

| Place | Number | Name | MLS | MLS Cup | U.S. Open Cup | Total |
|---|---|---|---|---|---|---|
| 1 | 11 | (Argentina) Javier Morales | 5 | 0 | 0 | 5 |
| 2 | 8 | (Ecuador) Joao Plata | 3 | 0 | 0 | 3 |
| 2 | 19 | (England) Luke Mulholland | 3 | 0 | 1 | 4 |
| 4 | 5 | (United States) Kyle Beckerman | 3 | 0 | 0 | 3 |
| 4 | 15 | (Costa Rica) Álvaro Saborío | 2 | 0 | 0 | 2 |
| 6 | 17 | (United States) Chris Wingert | 1 | 0 | 0 | 1 |
| 6 | 20 | (United States) Ned Grabavoy | 1 | 0 | 0 | 1 |
| 6 | 21 | (United States) Luis Gil | 1 | 0 | 0 | 1 |
| 6 | 26 | (Colombia) Sebastián Velásquez | 1 | 0 | 0 | 1 |
| 6 | 29 | (The Gambia) Abdoulie Mansally | 1 | 0 | 0 | 1 |
| 6 | 49 | (United States) Devon Sandoval | 1 | 0 | 0 | 1 |
| Total | | | 21 | 0 | 0 | 21 |

Source: mlssoccer.com

=== Disciplinary record ===
As of July 9, 2014

| Number | Nationality | Position | Name | MLS | | MLS Cup | | US Open Cup | | Total | |
| Number | Nationality | Position | Name | Yellow card | Red card | Yellow card | Red card | Yellow card | Red card | Yellow card | Red card |
|---|---|---|---|---|---|---|---|---|---|---|---|
| 19 | (England) | MF | Luke Mulholland | 3 | 1 | 0 | 0 | 0 | 0 | 2 | 1 |
| 2 | (United States) | DF | Tony Beltran | 4 | 1* | 0 | 0 | 0 | 0 | 4 | 1 |
| 11 | (Argentina) | MF | Javier Morales | 5 | 0 | 0 | 0 | 0 | 0 | 5 | 0 |
| 6 | (United States) | DF | Nat Borchers | 3 | 0 | 0 | 0 | 0 | 0 | 3 | 0 |
| 15 | (Costa Rica) | FW | Álvaro Saborío | 3 | 0 | 0 | 0 | 0 | 0 | 3 | 0 |
| 28 | (United States) | DF | Chris Schuler | 3 | 0 | 0 | 0 | 0 | 0 | 3 | 0 |
| 27 | (United States) | MF | John Stertzer | 2 | 0 | 0 | 0 | 0 | 0 | 2 | 0 |
| 17 | (United States) | DF | Chris Wingert | 3 | 0 | 0 | 0 | 0 | 0 | 3 | 0 |
| 5 | (United States) | MF | Kyle Beckerman | 2 | 0 | 0 | 0 | 0 | 0 | 2 | 0 |
| 18 | (United States) | GK | Nick Rimando | 1 | 0 | 0 | 0 | 0 | 0 | 1 | 0 |
| 12 | (United States) | MF | Cole Grossman | 1 | 0 | 0 | 0 | 0 | 0 | 1 | 0 |
| 13 | (Colombia) | FW | Olmes García | 2 | 0 | 0 | 0 | 0 | 0 | 2 | 0 |
| 4 | (United States) | DF | Aaron Maund | 0 | 0 | 0 | 0 | 1 | 0 | 1 | 0 |
| 16 | (Mexico) | DF | Carlos Salcedo | 0 | 0 | 0 | 0 | 1 | 0 | 1 | 0 |
| 18 | (United States) | GK | Nick Rimando | 1 | 0 | 0 | 0 | 0 | 0 | 1 | 0 |
| Total | | | | 33 | 2 | 0 | 0 | 2 | 0 | 35 | 2 |

Source: Competitions
Competitive matches only
* indicates a second yellow card ( (yellow card) (yellow-red card) )

=== Captains ===
| No. | P | Name | Country | No. games | Notes |
|---|---|---|---|---|---|
| 5 | MF | Kyle Beckerman | (United States) | 13 | Club Captain |
| 11 | MF | Javier Morales | (United States) | 6 | Vice Captain |

Last updated: July 9, 2014
Source: Competitive match reports.
Competitive matches only
Matches started as captain only
Country: FIFA nationality; No.: Squad number; P: Position; Name: Player name; No. Games: Number of games started as captain.
