= Carlos Salcedo =

Mexican footballer (born 1993)

- Salcedo with Mexico at the 2018 FIFA World Cup

Personal information
- Full name: Carlos Joel Salcedo Hernández
- Date of birth: 29 September 1993 (age 33)
- Place of birth: Guadalajara, Jalisco, Mexico
- Height: 1.82 m (6 ft 0 in)
- Position: Centre-back

Team information
- Current team: Monterrey
- Number: 13

Youth career
- 2006–2008: Guadalajara
- 2008–2012: Tigres UANL
- 2012–2013: Real Salt Lake

Senior career*
Years	Team	Apps	(Gls)
2013–2014	Real Salt Lake	25	(1)
2015–2018	Guadalajara	55	(1)
2016–2017	→ Fiorentina (loan)	18	(0)
2017–2018	→ Eintracht Frankfurt (loan)	20	(0)
2018–2019	Eintracht Frankfurt	6	(0)
2019–2022	Tigres UANL	85	(6)
2022	Toronto FC	13	(0)
2022–2023	Juárez	31	(0)
2023–2024	Cruz Azul	33	(0)
2024	Juárez	13	(1)
2025–	Monterrey	26	(0)

International career^{‡}
2014	Mexico U21	5	(1)
2015–2016	Mexico Olympic	7	(1)
2015–2021	Mexico	47	(1)
Medal record
Men's football
Representing Mexico
CONCACAF Gold Cup
Winner	2019 United States	Team
Runner-up	2021 United States	Team
Olympic Qualifying Championship
Winner	2015 United States
- * Club domestic league appearances and goals as of 21 November 2026 ‡ National team caps and goals as of 1 August 2021

Carlos Joel Salcedo Hernández (born 29 September 1993), also known as El Titán, is a Mexican professional footballer who plays as a centre-back for Liga MX club Monterrey.

Salcedo played for the youth academies of Guadalajara and Tigres UANL before moving to Real Salt Lake, where he made his professional debut in 2013. He returned to Guadalajara in 2015. The following year, he moved abroad with loan spells at Fiorentina and Eintracht Frankfurt, securing a permanent move with the latter. In January 2019, he returned to Mexico to join Tigres UANL. Salcedo went on to play for Toronto FC, Juárez, Cruz Azul and Monterrey.

In April 2015, Salcedo received his first call-up to Mexico national team. He was called up to participate at the 2015 Copa América and Copa América Centenario, the 2019 CONCACAF Gold Cup, the 2016 Summer Olympics, the 2017 FIFA Confederations Cup, and the 2018 FIFA World Cup.

== Club career ==
=== Early career ===
Having previously played at Guadalajara's and Tigres UANL's youth academy teams, Salcedo joined Major League Soccer (MLS) club Real Salt Lake's academy in January 2012. In August of the same year he began training with the first-team squad. Salcedo signed a home grown player contract with Salt Lake in January 2013, having met the minimum requirement to be defined as "home grown" of one year academy training.

=== Real Salt Lake ===
On 4 May 2013, Salcedo made his professional MLS debut for Real Salt Lake as a substitute against Vancouver Whitecaps, ending in a 2–0 win entering as a substitute in the 89th minute. In the second half of the 2013 season he was a regular starter for Salt Lake starting 12 games by season's end.

Following a lack of playing time in the 2014 season with Real Salt Lake, in November 2014, Salcedo took to Twitter asking the team not to bring him into future team plans, citing issues with former general manager Garth Lagerwey.

=== Guadalajara ===
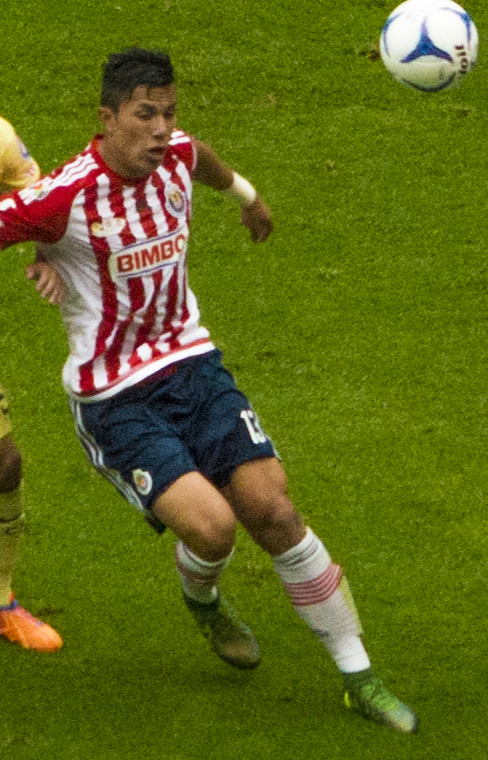
Salcedo with Guadalajara in 2015

On 6 January 2015, Salcedo returned to Mexican side C.D. Guadalajara, for the price of $450,000. Salcedo made his debut for the club in a 2–1 win at home against Pumas UNAM in which he played the first 60 minutes.

On 1 March, Salcedo scored his first goal in a 3–0 win at home against Monterrey in which he played the full 90 minutes. At the end of his first tournament with Chivas, he was listed in the Best XI. The following season, he would win the Apertura 2015 Copa MX with Guadalajara, defeating Club León 1–0, qualifying them to the 2016 Supercopa MX, where they would also go on to win, defeating Veracruz 2–0.

==== Loan to Fiorentina ====
On 21 August 2016, Italian club ACF Fiorentina announced they had acquired Salcedo on loan, with the option to purchase the player at the end of the deal. Salcedo made his debut with Fiorentina on 15 September against PAOK in their 0–0 draw in the Europa League. He made his Serie A debut ten days later against Milan in a 0–0 draw.

==== Loan to Eintracht Frankfurt ====
On 13 June 2017, Salcedo joined German side Eintracht Frankfurt on an initial loan from Guadalajara with an option to buy. Following a shoulder injury sustained at the 2017 FIFA Confederations Cup, Salcedo's Bundesliga debut came on 9 September against Borussia Mönchengladbach which ended in a 1–0 win for Eintracht Frankfurt, playing the entirety of the match.

In April 2018, Salcedo was listed as one of three center-backs nominated for the Bundesliga Team of the Season, alongside Mats Hummels and Jerome Boateng. On 14 May, Eintracht Frankfurt announced they had signed Salcedo to a four-year contract, tying him to the club until 2022. On 19 May, Salcedo won the DFB-Pokal with Eintracht Frankfurt after they defeated Bayern Munich 3–1 in the final.

=== Eintracht Frankfurt ===
On 12 August 2018, Salcedo played in his first competitive game of the season in Frankfurt's 5–0 loss to Bayern Munich for the DFL-Supercup. On 1 September, during a league match against Werder Bremen, which Frankfurt lost 2–1, Salcedo suffered a high ankle sprain, meaning he would be ruled out of action for an undetermined amount of time. On 2 December, he reappeared as an unused substitute in Frankfurt's 2–1 loss to Wolfsburg. Six days later, he made his return to the starting eleven in Frankfurt's 1–0 loss to Hertha Berlin.

=== Tigres UANL ===
On 22 January 2019, amidst much speculation, Tigres UANL announced via social media the signing of Salcedo to a four-year contract, being handed the number 3 which had previously been worn by Juninho, who had retired at the conclusion of the 2018 Apertura.

He had cited family issues as the main reason for returning to Mexico. Salcedo also revealed that he did not return to C.D. Guadalajara because the team was only looking to acquire him on loan from Frankfurt, an offer which was declined by the German side. Two weeks after being officially presented with Tigres, Salcedo made his Liga MX debut in a 2–0 victory against Veracruz.

On 12 March, in the second leg of the 2019 CONCACAF Champions League quarter-finals against MLS side Houston Dynamo, Salcedo scored his first goal with Tigres in a 1–0 victory. Four days later, he scored his first league goal with Tigres in a 4–1 victory over Querétaro. Despite Tigres finishing runners-up in the CONCACAF Champions League Finals to city rivals C.F. Monterrey,

Salcedo was included in the competition's Best XI. The following month, on 26 May, Salcedo won the Clausura championship with Tigres after defeating León 1–0 on aggregate in the finals. On 22 December 2020, Tigres won the CONCACAF Champions League with a 2–1 victory over MLS side Los Angeles FC.

=== Later career ===
On 31 January 2022, Salcedo returned to MLS, signing with Toronto FC as a Designated Player. Six months later, Toronto and Salcedo mutually agreed to the termination of his contract in order for him to return to Mexico for family reasons. Shortly after, Salcedo joined Juárez. On 16 June 2023, Cruz Azul reached an agreement to sign Salcedo. On 22 July 2024, Cruz Azul and Salcedo parted ways by mutual agreement. On 4 August, Salcedo returned to Juárez. On 19 January 2025, Monterrey announced the arrival of Salcedo. On that very day, the player sustained a significant injury during his first training session. On 21 October, he made his debut for the club in a match against Juárez.

== International career ==
=== Youth ===
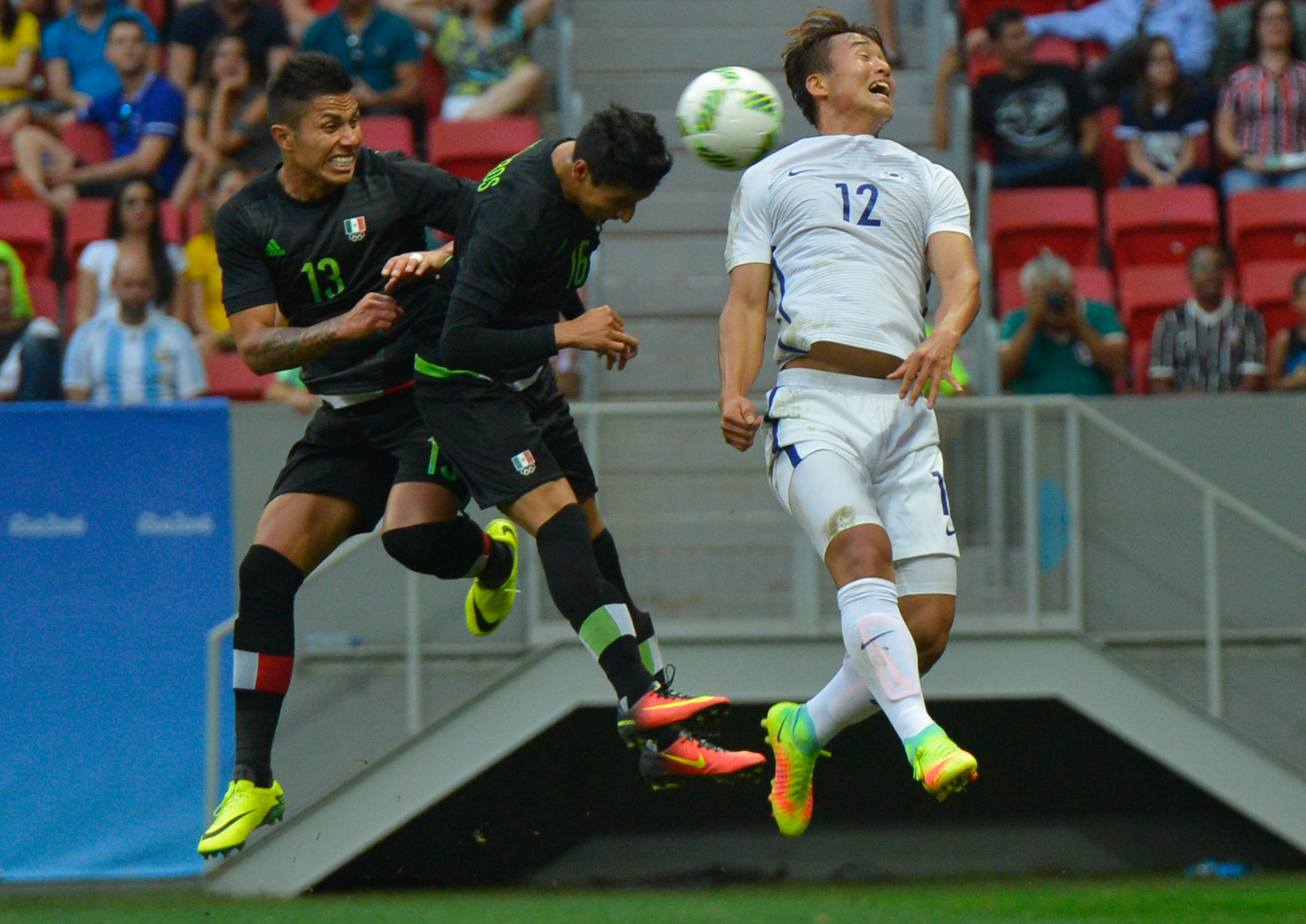
Salcedo (left) disputing the ball against South Korea in the 2016 Summer Olympics

Salcedo was called up by Raúl Gutiérrez to participate in the 2014 Central American and Caribbean Games. He went on to appear in four matches as Mexico won the tournament.

On 18 September 2015, Salcedo was once again selected by coach Raúl Gutiérrez to play in the CONCACAF Olympic Qualifying Championship. Chosen as team captain for the competition, he appeared in four matches, winning the tournament and a berth to the Summer Olympics.

On 7 July 2016, Salcedo was named in Mexico's 23-man squad for the Summer Olympics in Rio de Janeiro. He appeared in all three group stage matches, scoring the fourth goal in a 5–1 defeat of Fiji, though Mexico failed to make it out of the group after finishing in third.

=== Senior ===
Salcedo was called up by Miguel Herrera to participate with the senior national team and on 15 April 2015, he made his debut in a friendly game against the United States, losing 0–2. He was included in the final roster to participate in that year's Copa América. He only made one appearance, on 15 June, coming on as a substitute in the 71st minute for Adrián Aldrete in a 3–3 draw against host-nation Chile.

On 8 June 2017, Salcedo was included by Juan Carlos Osorio to be Mexico's 23-man squad for the FIFA Confederations Cup in Russia. On 21 June, during Mexico's second group stage match against New Zealand, Salcedo was taken off during the first half after sustaining a shoulder injury following a collision with striker Chris Wood. He was subsequently ruled out for the rest of the tournament.

On 27 March 2018, during a friendly match against Croatia he would pick up a fractured left collarbone injury, putting in risk a call up for the FIFA World Cup. Salcedo was subsequently named in the final 23-man squad for the World Cup. He played in all group stage matches, including in the round-of-16 loss against Brazil. Following Mexico's elimination, Salcedo pondered his future with the national team, citing personal issues. He was eventually called up to participate in September friendlies by interim manager Ricardo Ferretti, but withdrew due to a high ankle sprain injury.

On 6 June 2019, Salcedo was called up by coach Gerardo Martino to participate in the Gold Cup. In the quarter-final match against Costa Rica, as the match was sent to a penalty shoot-out following a 1–1 tie, he scored Mexico's winning penalty before Mexico goalkeeper Guillermo Ochoa blocked the subsequent Costa Rica shot. As Mexico went on to win the tournament after defeating the United States 1–0 in the final, he was named in the competition's Best XI.

On 30 September 2020, he appeared as captain in a friendly match against Guatemala, winning 3–0. On 14 November, Salcedo scored his first goal in a friendly match against South Korea, winning 3–2.

== Style of play ==
"[H]is time at Real Salt Lake [defined] his style because he flies into tackles, he’s got that kind of American-style defending. He does have that steel. He plays on the edge."

— Reporter Tom Marshall on Salcedo's playing style.

A natural center-back, Salcedo has been deployed as a full-back: on the right side while playing for the Mexico national team and on the left when he used to play for Real Salt Lake. He is known as "a good passer and as a concentrated player who likes to play long balls, he is known for his well timed slide tackles and his strength in the back line, his abilities to win most of the aerial duels makes him a complete defender." He has also been described as "tall, strong, physically imposing and quick on the ball. He has superb slide tackling skills and is willing to throw his body into danger if it means stopping an opponents attack."

He is commonly known by his nickname Titan, as a result of his imposing physical presence and his speedy recoveries from injuries, as well as being able to play through them. In an interview with Tom Marshall from Goal.com, Salcedo stated that his early move to the MLS would help develop his playing style, arguing "that MLS is generally more physical than in Mexico, but that learning to combat a more direct style complements the technique and comfort on the ball that was drilled into him, first at [Guadalajara] and later with Tigres."

== Personal ==
His father, Carlos Salcedo Snr, played for Atlas F.C. in Mexico, his great-grandfather had played for C.D. Guadalajara and been a league winner in Mexico. His great-uncle, Hugo Salcedo, played Soccer for the U.S. at the 1972 Olympic Games. His son and Carlos's first-cousin, once removed, Jorge Salcedo played for four teams in MLS between 1996 and 2000, and was capped by the United States national soccer team.

== Career statistics ==
=== Club ===
As of match played on 21 November 2026

Club	Season	League			Cup		Continental		Global		Other		Total	
Club	Season	Division	Apps	Goals	Apps	Goals	Apps	Goals	Apps	Goals	Apps	Goals	Apps	Goals
Real Salt Lake	2013	MLS	13	0	4	0	—		—		—		17	0
Real Salt Lake	2014	MLS	12	1	1	0	—		—		—		13	1
Real Salt Lake	Total		25	1	5	0	—		—		—		30	1
Guadalajara	2014–15	Liga MX	20	1	—		—		—		—		20	1
Guadalajara	2015–16	Liga MX	32	0	4 (Note: Includes one appearance in Supercopa MX)	0	—		—		—		36	0
Guadalajara	2016–17	Liga MX	3	0	—		—		—		—		3	0
Guadalajara	Total		55	1	4	0	—		—		—		59	1
Fiorentina (loan)	2016–17	Serie A	18	0	—		2 (Note: Appearances in UEFA Europa League)	0	—		—		20	0
Eintracht Frankfurt (loan)	2017–18	Bundesliga	20	0	4	0	—		—		—		24	0
Eintracht Frankfurt	2018–19	Bundesliga	6	0	2 (Note: Includes one appearance in the DFL-Supercup)	0	—		—		—		8	0
Tigres UANL	2018–19	Liga MX	15	1	—		7 (Note: Appearances in CONCACAF Champions Cup)	1	—		2 (Note: Appearances in Leagues Cup)	0	24	2
Tigres UANL	2019–20	Liga MX	21	1	—		5	0	—		—		26	1
Tigres UANL	2020–21	Liga MX	32	1	3 (Note: Appearances in Copa GNP por México)	0	—		3 (Note: Appearances in FIFA Club World Cup)	0	—		38	1
Tigres UANL	2021–22	Liga MX	17	3	—		—		—		—		17	3
Tigres UANL	Total		85	6	3	0	12	1	3	0	2	0	105	7
Toronto FC	2022	MLS	13	0	3 (Note: Includes appearance in the 2020 Canadian Championship final (played in 2022))	0	—		—		—		16	0
Juárez	2022–23	Liga MX	31	0	—		—		—		—		31	0
Cruz Azul	2023–24	Liga MX	33	0	—		—		—		3	0	36	0
Juárez	2024–25	Liga MX	13	1	—		—		—		—		13	1
Monterrey	2025–26	Liga MX	15	0	—		3	0	—		—		18	0
Monterrey	2026–27	Liga MX	11	0	—		—		—		5	0	16	0
Monterrey	Total		26	0	—		3	0	—		5	0	34	0
Career total			325	9	21	0	17	1	3	0	10	0	376	10

=== International ===
As of match played on 1 August 2021

Mexico
Year	Apps	Goals
2015	4	0
2016	2	0
2017	10	0
2018	9	0
2019	9 (Note: Carlos Salcedo additionally played a match against Martinique in 2019, which is not recognized by FIFA.)	0
2020	2	1
2021	11	0
Total	47	1

==== International goals ====
Scores and results list Mexico's goal tally first.

No.	Date	Venue	Opponent	Score	Result	Competition
1.	14 November 2020	Stadion Wiener Neustadt, Wiener Neustadt, Austria	South Korea	3–1	3–2	Friendly

== Honours ==
Guadalajara

- Copa MX: Apertura 2015
- Supercopa MX: 2016

Eintracht Frankfurt

- DFB-Pokal: 2017–18

Tigres UANL

- Liga MX: Clausura 2019
- CONCACAF Champions League: 2020

Toronto FC

- Canadian Championship: 2020

Mexico Youth

- Central American and Caribbean Games: 2014
- CONCACAF Olympic Qualifying Championship: 2015

Mexico

- CONCACAF Gold Cup: 2019
- CONCACAF Nations League runner-up: 2019–20

Individual

- Liga MX Best XI: Clausura 2015, Clausura 2024
- CONCACAF Champions League Team of the Tournament: 2019
- CONCACAF Gold Cup Best XI: 2019
- IFFHS CONCACAF Men's Best XI: 2020
- IFFHS CONCACAF Men's Team of the Decade: 2011–2020
- IFFHS CONCACAF Men's All Time Dream Team
