= Kyle Beckerman =

American soccer player (born 1982)

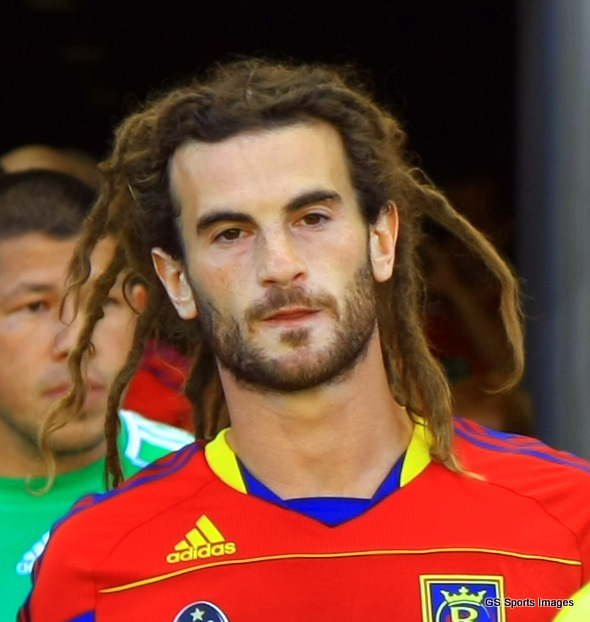
- Beckerman with Real Salt Lake in 2010

Personal information
- Full name: Kyle Robert Beckerman
- Date of birth: April 23, 1982 (age 44)
- Place of birth: Crofton, Maryland, United States
- Height: 5 ft 10 in (1.78 m)
- Position: Midfielder

Team information
- Current team: Utah Valley Wolverines (head coach)

Youth career
- 1999: IMG Soccer Academy

Senior career*
| Years | Team | Apps | (Gls) |
| 2000–2001 | Miami Fusion | 3 | (1) |
| 2000 | → MLS Pro-40 (loan) | 7 | (0) |
| 2002–2007 | Colorado Rapids | 155 | (10) |
| 2007–2020 | Real Salt Lake | 377 | (30) |
| Total | | 545 | (41) |

International career
| 1999 | United States U17 | 40 | (15) |
| 2007–2016 | United States | 58 | (1) |

Managerial career
- 2021–2025: Utah Valley Wolverines
Medal record
Men's Soccer
Representing United States
CONCACAF Gold Cup
| Winner | 2013 United States |
| Runner-up | 2009 United States |
CONCACAF Cup
| Runner-up | 2015 United States |
- * Club domestic league appearances and goals

Kyle Robert Beckerman (born April 23, 1982) is an American former professional soccer player who played as a midfielder. He spent 21 seasons in Major League Soccer (MLS) with the Miami Fusion (2000–2001), Colorado Rapids (2002–2007) and Real Salt Lake (2007–2020). He was a starting central defensive midfielder and captain when RSL won MLS Cup 2009. He also earned 58 caps with the United States national team.

In 2021, Beckerman was named the head coach of the Utah Valley University men's soccer team, a Division I program in Orem, Utah.

== Early life ==
Beckerman was born in Crofton, Maryland. His parents are Margaret "Meg" (née Lamade) Beckerman, a third grade teacher, and Paul Beckerman, a science teacher. His brother Todd is four years his senior and coaches the wrestling team at Brown University.

== Personal life ==
On January 4, 2014, he married Kate Pappas, a Greek American account supervisor at Love Communications, at the Holy Trinity Greek Orthodox Cathedral in Salt Lake City.

Beckerman is known for his distinctive dreadlocks, which he started growing around 2005. In November 2017 Beckerman shaved off the majority of his hair, after his RSL coach jokingly told him to cut his hair and come back a new man.

== Club career ==
=== Early career ===
Beckerman began his career in various youth leagues in the Bowie, Maryland area. He played for the United States in the 1999 Under-17 World Cup in New Zealand. He attended DeMatha Catholic High School in Hyattsville, Maryland as a freshman, where he won a state wrestling title. He later transferred to and graduated from Arundel High School, and he signed a Nike Project-40 contract with MLS on June 27, 2000. Beckerman had been involved with the league for the previous few years, having been one of the inaugural students at the United States Soccer Federation's Bradenton Academy, which also featured Landon Donovan, DaMarcus Beasley, Oguchi Onyewu, and Bobby Convey.

=== Miami Fusion ===
Two days after he signed with the league, Miami Fusion claimed Beckerman. Beckerman hardly played in his first two years; he registered only 110 minutes in his first year and only 14 in his second after breaking his leg playing in the A-League. He went on loan with MLS Project 40 in 2000.

=== Colorado Rapids ===
After the Fusion were contracted at the end of the 2001 season, Beckerman was selected 11th overall in the 2002 MLS Dispersal Draft by the Colorado Rapids. In his first year with the Rapids, Beckerman again saw limited time, playing 477 minutes and registering one assist. In his second season, he finally broke through, starting 24 games, playing 2124 minutes, and registering five assists as a central midfielder. Beckerman performed at the same level in 2004, starting consistently. Beckerman remained a regular starter through the 2005 and 2006 seasons, playing an increasingly important role for the Rapids. He finished the 2006 season with seven goals and four assists, making him one of Colorado's top offensive players that year.

=== Real Salt Lake ===
On July 16, 2007, Beckerman was traded to Real Salt Lake for Mehdi Ballouchy. Despite joining the team mid-season, he quickly established himself as a team leader for RSL. He took over the captain's armband early in the 2008 season. He started all 38 matches for Salt Lake that year, helping the team reach the Western Conference Final (the club's first-ever playoff appearance). Also in 2008, he was named to the MLS All-Star Inactive List for the second consecutive season.

Beckerman continued as RSL's team captain throughout the 2009 season. During the year, he became the youngest player in MLS history to appear in 200 games. At mid-season, MLS Commissioner Don Garber added Beckerman and teammate Javier Morales to the roster for the 2009 MLS All-Star Game played July 29 at RSL's Rio Tinto Stadium in Sandy, Utah. RSL struggled through an up-and-down regular season, finishing with a losing record (11–12–7) and barely qualifying for postseason play. But with Beckerman leading the way, the team completed a stunning sweep through the playoffs, capped with a shootout victory over Los Angeles Galaxy in the 2009 MLS Cup championship.

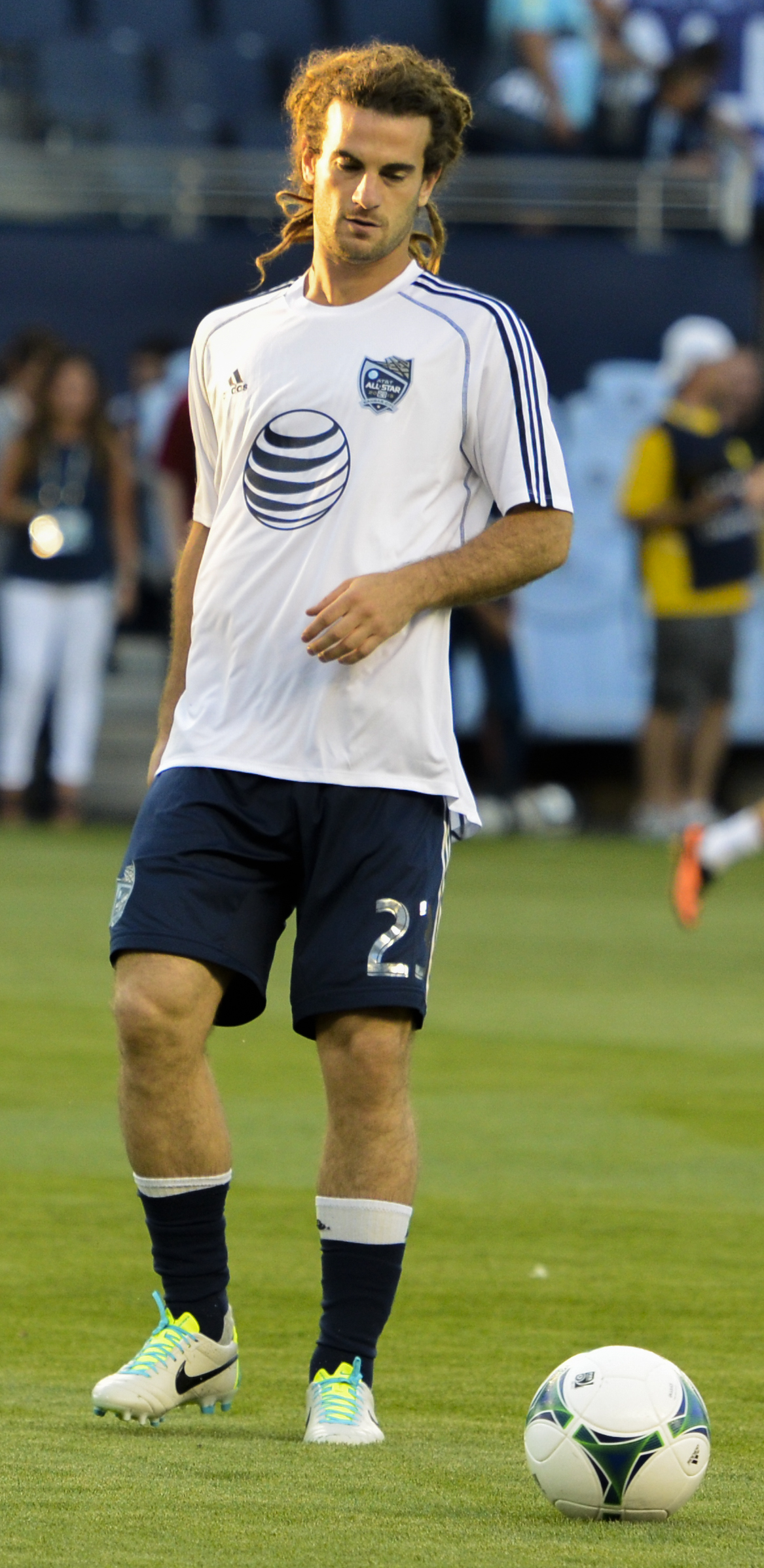
Kyle Beckerman, Real Salt Lake Midfielder, warming up at the MLS All Star game at Sporting Park, Kansas City, Kansas on July 31, 2013.

On October 17, 2015, Beckerman broke the record for all-time MLS regular season appearances by a field player, at 379.

Beckerman was named on December 9, 2020, to The 25 Greatest by Major League Soccer as part of the circuit's 25th season celebration. He announced his retirement as an active player twelve days later on December 21.

== International career ==
Beckerman represented the United States on multiple levels of competition. He made his first international appearance in 1997 as a member of the U16 national team in a match against France. He made 40 appearances for the U17 national team, starting 36 times and scoring 15 goals. He started all six games in the 1999 FIFA U-17 World Championship in New Zealand, helping the U.S. to a fourth-place finish in the tournament. He also played for the U23 national team in the 2004 Pre-Olympic Qualifying Tournament in Mexico.

Beckerman's first appearance for the senior national team came January 20, 2007 in a friendly match against Denmark. He was named to the U.S. roster for the 2007 Copa América in Venezuela, where he earned two caps: he entered as a reserve against Argentina, then played the full 90 minutes against Colombia. In July 2009, he was named to the U.S. roster for the 2009 CONCACAF Gold Cup. He started all six matches for the United States, helping his team to a second-place finish in the tournament. On July 18, 2009, he scored his first international goal in the quarterfinal match against Panama. On August 27, 2009, Beckerman was named to the national team roster for two World Cup qualifier matches: against El Salvador (September 5) and Trinidad & Tobago (September 9). He entered the match against El Salvador as a second-half substitute.

In August 2011, Beckerman re-joined the U.S. at the invitation of new coach Jürgen Klinsmann. He played all 90 minutes in a friendly match against Mexico (a 1–1 draw) on August 10, and was a halftime substitute in a 1–0 friendly loss against Belgium on September 6. Since that time, Beckerman has been a regular on the national team.

Throughout July 2013, Beckerman was called up for the 2013 CONCACAF Gold Cup alongside Real Salt Lake teammates Nick Rimando and Tony Beltran. Both Beckerman and Rimando started in five out of six games while Beltran started in only one match in home stadium Rio Tinto Stadium, where the trio played a full 90 minutes in front of their home crowd. Beckerman made three assists throughout the tournament until making to the final. On July 28, 2013, Beckerman played a full 90 minutes with Rimando to help secure the United States' 5th Gold Cup championship against Panama in a 1–0 victory. It was his first Gold Cup title as well as Rimando's and Beltran's. He was also named the game's Most Valuable Player.

On May 22, 2014, Beckerman was named to the final 23-man roster for the 2014 FIFA World Cup in Brazil. The tournament was his first-ever World Cup appearance. He started as defensive midfielder in all three matches of the group stage, as the U.S. advanced out of the "Group of Death". Klinsmann elected to sit Beckerman in the Round of 16 match against Belgium; the Americans subsequently allowed 18 shots on goal in a 2–1 loss, which eliminated them from the World Cup.

== Coaching career ==
On April 12, 2021, Beckerman was named head coach of the Utah Valley Wolverines men's soccer team. On November 15, 2025, Beckerman resigned from his position at Utah Valley.

== Career statistics ==
=== Club ===
Appearances and goals by club, season and competition
| Club | Season | League | | | National cup | | League cup | | Continental | | Total | |
| Club | Season | Division | Apps | Goals | Apps | Goals | Apps | Goals | Apps | Goals | Apps | Goals |
|---|---|---|---|---|---|---|---|---|---|---|---|---|
| Project 40 (loan) | 2000 | A-League | 7 | 0 | 0 | 0 | 0 | 0 | 0 | 0 | 7 | 0 |
| Miami Fusion | 2000 | Major League Soccer | 2 | 1 | 1 | 0 | 0 | 0 | 0 | 0 | 3 | 1 |
| Miami Fusion | 2001 | Major League Soccer | 1 | 0 | 0 | 0 | 0 | 0 | 0 | 0 | 1 | 0 |
| Miami Fusion | Total | | 3 | 1 | 1 | 0 | 0 | 0 | 0 | 0 | 4 | 1 |
| Colorado Rapids | 2002 | Major League Soccer | 14 | 0 | 0 | 0 | 0 | 0 | 0 | 0 | 14 | 0 |
| Colorado Rapids | 2003 | Major League Soccer | 30 | 0 | 2 | 0 | 2 | 0 | 0 | 0 | 32 | 0 |
| Colorado Rapids | 2004 | Major League Soccer | 31 | 1 | 1 | 0 | 2 | 0 | 0 | 0 | 32 | 1 |
| Colorado Rapids | 2005 | Major League Soccer | 33 | 1 | 0 | 0 | 3 | 0 | 0 | 0 | 33 | 1 |
| Colorado Rapids | 2006 | Major League Soccer | 34 | 7 | 2 | 0 | 3 | 0 | 0 | 0 | 36 | 7 |
| Colorado Rapids | 2007 | Major League Soccer | 13 | 1 | 1 | 0 | 0 | 0 | 0 | 0 | 14 | 1 |
| Colorado Rapids | Total | | 155 | 10 | 6 | 0 | 10 | 0 | 0 | 0 | 171 | 10 |
| Real Salt Lake | 2007 | Major League Soccer | 15 | 2 | 0 | 0 | 0 | 0 | 0 | 0 | 15 | 2 |
| Real Salt Lake | 2008 | Major League Soccer | 33 | 3 | 2 | 2 | 3 | 0 | 0 | 0 | 35 | 5 |
| Real Salt Lake | 2009 | Major League Soccer | 29 | 3 | 1 | 0 | 4 | 0 | 0 | 0 | 30 | 3 |
| Real Salt Lake | 2010 | Major League Soccer | 24 | 2 | 1 | 0 | 2 | 0 | 5 | 1 | 30 | 3 |
| Real Salt Lake | 2011 | Major League Soccer | 32 | 3 | 2 | 0 | 3 | 0 | 5 | 0 | 39 | 3 |
| Real Salt Lake | 2012 | Major League Soccer | 32 | 4 | 0 | 0 | 2 | 0 | 3 | 1 | 35 | 5 |
| Real Salt Lake | 2013 | Major League Soccer | 31 | 4 | 5 | 1 | 5 | 0 | 0 | 0 | 36 | 5 |
| Real Salt Lake | 2014 | Major League Soccer | 30 | 3 | 0 | 0 | 2 | 0 | 0 | 0 | 30 | 3 |
| Real Salt Lake | 2015 | Major League Soccer | 26 | 1 | 1 | 0 | 0 | 0 | 4 | 0 | 31 | 1 |
| Real Salt Lake | 2016 | Major League Soccer | 28 | 0 | 1 | 0 | 1 | 0 | 2 | 0 | 31 | 0 |
| Real Salt Lake | 2017 | Major League Soccer | 26 | 4 | 0 | 0 | 0 | 0 | 0 | 0 | 26 | 4 |
| Real Salt Lake | 2018 | Major League Soccer | 34 | 1 | 0 | 0 | 3 | 0 | 0 | 0 | 34 | 1 |
| Real Salt Lake | 2019 | Major League Soccer | 27 | 0 | 1 | 0 | 2 | 0 | 1 | 0 | 29 | 0 |
| Real Salt Lake | 2020 | Major League Soccer | 10 | 0 | 0 | 0 | 0 | 0 | 0 | 0 | 10 | 0 |
| Real Salt Lake | Total | | 377 | 30 | 14 | 3 | 27 | 0 | 20 | 2 | 438 | 35 |
| Career total | | | 545 | 41 | 21 | 3 | 37 | 0 | 20 | 2 | 620 | 46 |

=== International ===
Appearances and goals by national team and year
| National team | Year | Apps | Goals |
|---|---|---|---|
| United States | 2007 | 3 | 0 |
| United States | 2009 | 7 | 1 |
| United States | 2010 | 2 | 0 |
| United States | 2011 | 6 | 0 |
| United States | 2012 | 5 | 0 |
| United States | 2013 | 10 | 0 |
| United States | 2014 | 9 | 0 |
| United States | 2015 | 9 | 0 |
| United States | 2016 | 7 | 0 |
| Total | | 58 | 1 |

Scores and results list the United States' goal tally first, score column indicates score after each Beckerman goal.

List of international goals scored by Kyle Beckerman
| No. | Date | Venue | Opponent | Score | Result | Competition |
|---|---|---|---|---|---|---|
| 1 | July 18, 2009 | Lincoln Financial Field, Philadelphia, United States | Panama | | 2–1 | 2009 CONCACAF Gold Cup |

== See also ==
- List of select Jewish football (association; soccer) players
