= Chris Schuler =

American soccer player (born 1987)

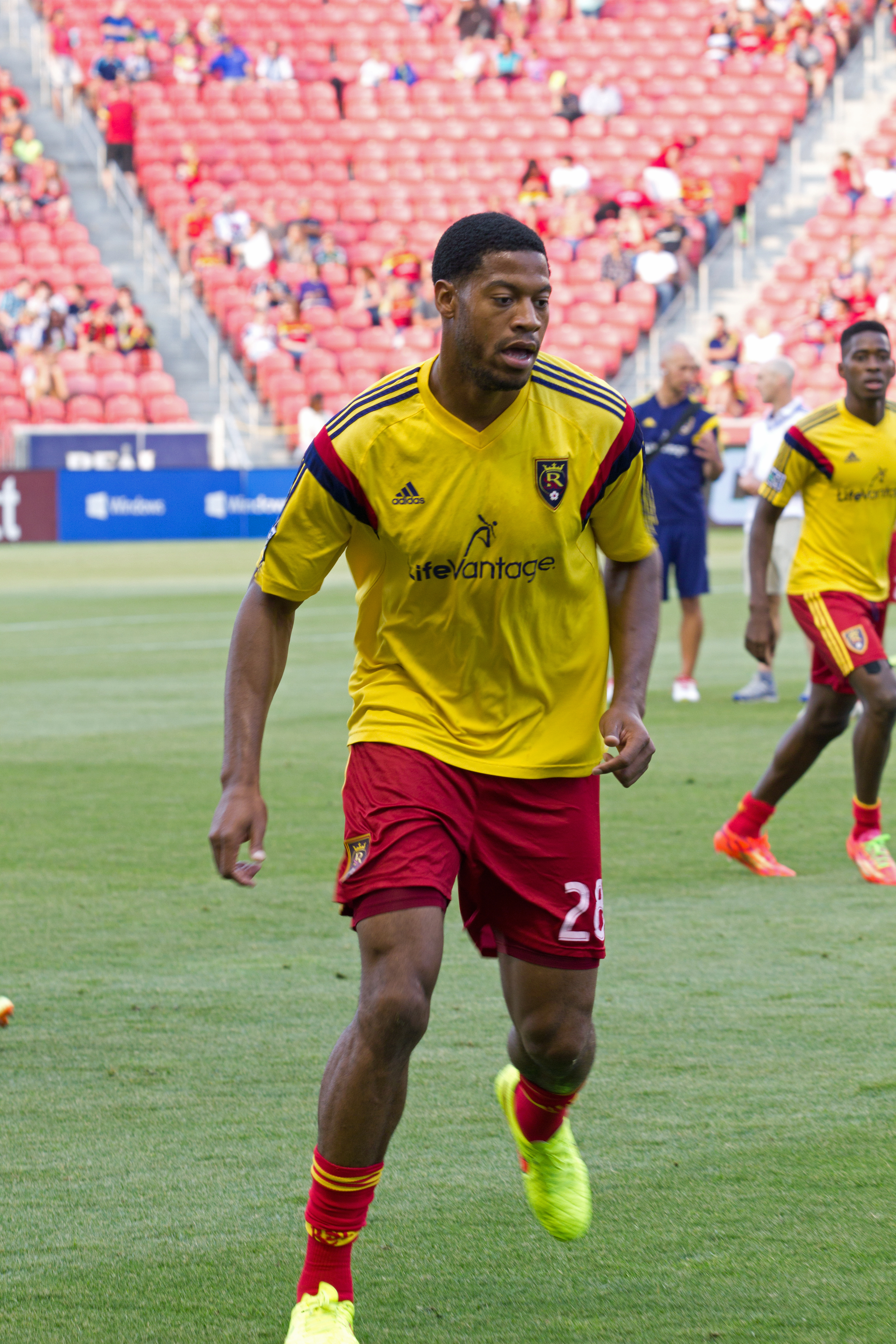
- Schuler playing for Real Salt Lake

Personal information
- Date of birth: September 6, 1987 (age 39)
- Place of birth: St. Louis, Missouri, United States
- Height: 6 ft 4 in (1.93 m)
- Position: Defender

College career
Years	Team	Apps	(Gls)
2006–2009	Creighton Bluejays		

Senior career*
Years	Team	Apps	(Gls)
2006–2009	Chicago Fire Premier	31	(1)
2010–2015	Real Salt Lake	80	(5)
2010	→ AC St. Louis (loan)	4	(0)
2015	→ Real Monarchs (loan)	2	(0)
2016	Real Monarchs	9	(0)
2016–2017	Real Salt Lake	16	(0)
2017	→ Real Monarchs (loan)	2	(0)
2018	Orlando City	9	(1)
- * Club domestic league appearances and goals as of October 28, 2018

Chris Schuler (born September 6, 1987) is an American former soccer player who last played for Orlando City in Major League Soccer. He is currently pursuing an events management career with US Soccer.

== Career ==
=== College and amateur ===
Schuler attended college at Creighton University. During his time there he won awards such as MVP at the US Youth Soccer National Championships in July 2006, Missouri Valley Conference Defensive Player of the Year, NSCAA Second-Team All-America and NSCAA All-Midwest Region First-Team.

During his college years Schuler also played for Chicago Fire Premier in the USL Premier Development League.

=== Professional ===
Schuler was drafted in the third round (39th overall) of the 2010 MLS SuperDraft by Real Salt Lake.

He made his professional debut on June 2, 2010, in a Lamar Hunt U.S. Open Cup game against D.C. United. Schuler joined USSF Division 2 club AC St. Louis on July 20, 2010, for a four-game loan deal, returning to Salt Lake before the end of the 2010 MLS season.

Schuler scored his first professional goal on April 9, 2011, in a game against the New England Revolution.

On November 8, 2013, Schuler scored what proved to be the series winner for RSL during the second leg of the 2013 Western Conference Semifinals versus the LA Galaxy, making the aggregate 2–1.

Once a promising player, Schuler could never stay healthy enough after 2014 to contribute enough to justify a role with the club. Real Salt Lake opted out of renewing Chris Schuler's contract as of November 30, 2015.

Following his release from Salt Lake at the end of the 2017 season, Schuler signed with Orlando City on March 2, 2018. He scored his first goal for the club, and his first in four years, in a 2–1 win against Toronto FC to help end a nine-game losing streak. At the end of the season the club announced they had declined his contract option.

== Career statistics ==
=== Club ===
As of October 28, 2018

Club	Season	League			Cup		League Cup		Continental		Total	
Club	Season	Division	Apps	Goals	Apps	Goals	Apps	Goals	Apps	Goals	Apps	Goals
Real Salt Lake	2010	MLS	1	0	0	0	0	0	-		1	0
Real Salt Lake	2011	MLS	20	2	1	0	3	0	3	0	27	2
Real Salt Lake	2012	MLS	13	0	0	0	0	0	-		13	0
Real Salt Lake	2013	MLS	16	0	0	0	5	2	1	0	22	2
Real Salt Lake	2014	MLS	25	3	0	0	2	0	-		27	3
Real Salt Lake	2015	MLS	5	0	1	0	0	0	-		6	0
Real Salt Lake	2016	MLS	4	0	0	0	1	0	-		5	0
Real Salt Lake	2017	MLS	12	0	0	0	0	0	-		12	0
Real Salt Lake	Total		96	5	2	0	11	2	4	0	113	7
AC St. Louis (loan)	2010	USSF D2	4	0	-		0	0	-		4	0
Real Monarchs (loan)	2015	USL	2	0	-		0	0	-		2	0
Real Monarchs (loan)	2016	USL	10	0	-		0	0	-		10	0
Real Monarchs (loan)	2017	USL	2	0	-		0	0	-		2	0
Real Monarchs (loan)	Total		14	0	-		0	0	-		14	0
Orlando City	2018	MLS	9	1	1	0	0	0	-		10	1
Career Totals			123	6	3	0	11	2	4	0	141	8
