= John Stertzer =

American soccer player (born 1990)

Personal information
- Full name: John Patrick Stertzer
- Date of birth: October 4, 1990 (age 36)
- Place of birth: Oakton, Virginia, United States
- Height: 1.82 m (6 ft 0 in)
- Position: Midfielder

Youth career
- 2008–2009: Potomac SC

College career
Years	Team	Apps	(Gls)
2009–2012	Maryland Terrapins		

Senior career*
Years	Team	Apps	(Gls)
2013–2016	Real Salt Lake	48	(1)
2015–2016	→ Real Monarchs (loan)	4	(0)
2017	New York City FC	5	(0)
- * Club domestic league appearances and goals as of 16:46, 29 October 2017 (UTC)

John Patrick Stertzer (born October 4, 1990) is an American soccer player who plays as a midfielder.

== Career ==
=== Real Salt Lake ===
After spending four seasons with the Maryland Terrapins Stertzer was selected as the twelfth overall pick in the 2013 MLS SuperDraft on January 17, 2013, by Real Salt Lake. Stertzer then made his official debut for Real Salt Lake in the MLS on March 9, 2013, against D.C. United at RFK Stadium in which he came on as a substitute for Khari Stephenson as Real Salt Lake lost the match 1–0. Stertzer was released by Salt Lake at the end of their 2016 season.

=== New York City FC ===
Stertzer signed with New York City FC on February 16, 2017. He was released by the club at the end of their 2017 season.

== Career statistics ==
=== Club ===
As of 8 October 2017

Club	Season	League		MLS Cup		US Open Cup		CONCACAF		Total	
Club	Season	Apps	Goals	Apps	Goals	Apps	Goals	Apps	Goals	Apps	Goals
Real Salt Lake	2013	2	0	0	0	0	0	—		2	0
Real Salt Lake	2014	9	0	0	0	1	0	—		10	0
Real Salt Lake	2015	19	1	0	0	3	0	2	0	24	1
Real Salt Lake	2016	18	0	0	0	1	0	0	0	19	0
Real Salt Lake	Total	48	1	0	0	5	0	2	0	55	1
Real Monarchs (loan)	2015	3	0	—		0	0	—		3	0
Real Monarchs (loan)	2016	1	0	—		0	0	—		1	0
Real Monarchs (loan)	Total	4	0	0	0	0	0	0	0	4	0
NYCFC	2017	5	0	0	0	1	0	—		6	0
Career total		57	1	0	0	6	0	2	0	65	1
