= Rich Balchan =

American soccer player (born 1989)

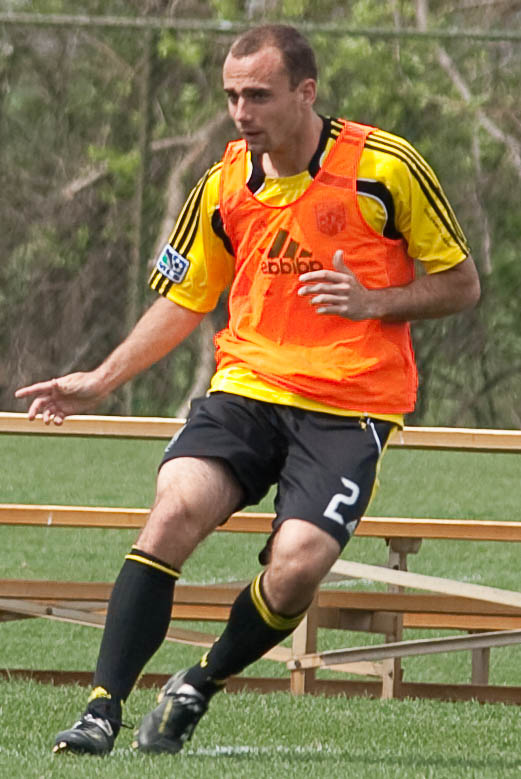

Personal information
- Full name: Richard Balchan
- Date of birth: January 18, 1989 (age 37)
- Place of birth: Ann Arbor, Michigan, U.S.
- Height: 6 ft 0 in (1.83 m)
- Position: Defender

College career
Years	Team	Apps	(Gls)
2007–2010	Indiana Hoosiers		

Senior career*
Years	Team	Apps	(Gls)
2008	Fort Wayne Fever	5	(2)
2009	FC Indiana		
2009–2010	Chicago Fire Premier	17	(2)
2011–2012	Columbus Crew	20	(1)
2013–2015	Real Salt Lake	14	(0)
2015–2016	Tampa Bay Rowdies	15	(1)
2016	Ottawa Fury FC Academy	1	(0)
2016	Ottawa Fury	3	(0)
2017	Pittsburgh Riverhounds	6	(0)
2018–2019	Atlantic City FC	18	(0)
Total		80	(6)

International career
2008	United States U20	5	(0)
- * Club domestic league appearances and goals as of April 30, 2017

Rich Balchan (born January 18, 1989) is an American retired soccer player.

== College and amateur ==
Born in Carmel, Indiana, Balchan attended Carmel High School, and played club soccer for Carmel United Cosmos, before going on to play four years of college soccer at Indiana University. He was named to the Big Ten All-Freshman Team following his first season in 2007, was named to the Big Ten Championship all-tournament team as a sophomore in 2008, was named to the All-Big Ten second-team and the NSCAA All-Great Lakes Region third-team as a junior in 2009, and was an All-Big Ten first team member, a Big Ten All-Tournament team pick and a member of the NSCAA All-Great Lakes region third-team following his senior year in 2010. He finished his college career with 4 goals and 7 assists in 80 games for the Hoosiers.

During his college years Balchan also played in the USL Premier Development League for Fort Wayne Fever and Chicago Fire Premier, and for half a season with FC Indiana in the National Premier Soccer League in 2009 (he transferred to Chicago halfway through the season). He was part of the Fire squad which reached the 2009 PDL championship game, but did not play in the final itself (which they lost 2–1 to Ventura County Fusion) after suffering an injury in the semi-final against the Cary Clarets.

== Professional ==
On January 14, 2011, Balchan was drafted in the first round (12th overall) in the 2011 MLS SuperDraft by the Columbus Crew. He made his professional debut on February 22, 2011, in the first leg of the Crew's CONCACAF Champions League quarter-final series against Real Salt Lake, and played his first league game with the Crew on March 19, 2011, in the season opener against D.C. United.

Balchan scored his first professional goal at Red Bull Arena on June 4, 2011, during a regular season match against the New York Red Bulls. He received a cross from Justin Meram and hit a sliding one-timer to equalize the game with about 30 seconds before the final whistle.

Balchan was released by Columbus following an injury-plagued 2012 season including 3 sports hernia surgeries after being pushed to play through a groin tear from July–November 2011. The operations kept him out most of 2012.

After signing with Real Salt Lake in 2013, Balchan was released at the end of their 2014 season following an injury plagued 2 years including shoulder and sports hernia surgeries. He subsequently signed with NASL club Tampa Bay Rowdies in March 2015. He was released in November 2015.

Balchan was released by the Rowdies at the end of the 2015 NASL season, and signed with Canadian club Ottawa Fury FC in January 2016. He played a match for their academy team in the third-tier Première Ligue de soccer du Québec. After rupturing all three tendons in his left hamstring against FC Edmonton, Balchan underwent season-ending surgery. Balchan recovered in time to roster for the final match of the season, and on 13 December 2016, he was released by the club. On March 1, 2017, he signed with Pittsburgh Riverhounds of the USL. On April 29, in just his sixth start of the season, Balchan ruptured his achilles requiring season-ending surgery. His contract expired at the end of the season and was not renewed by the club.

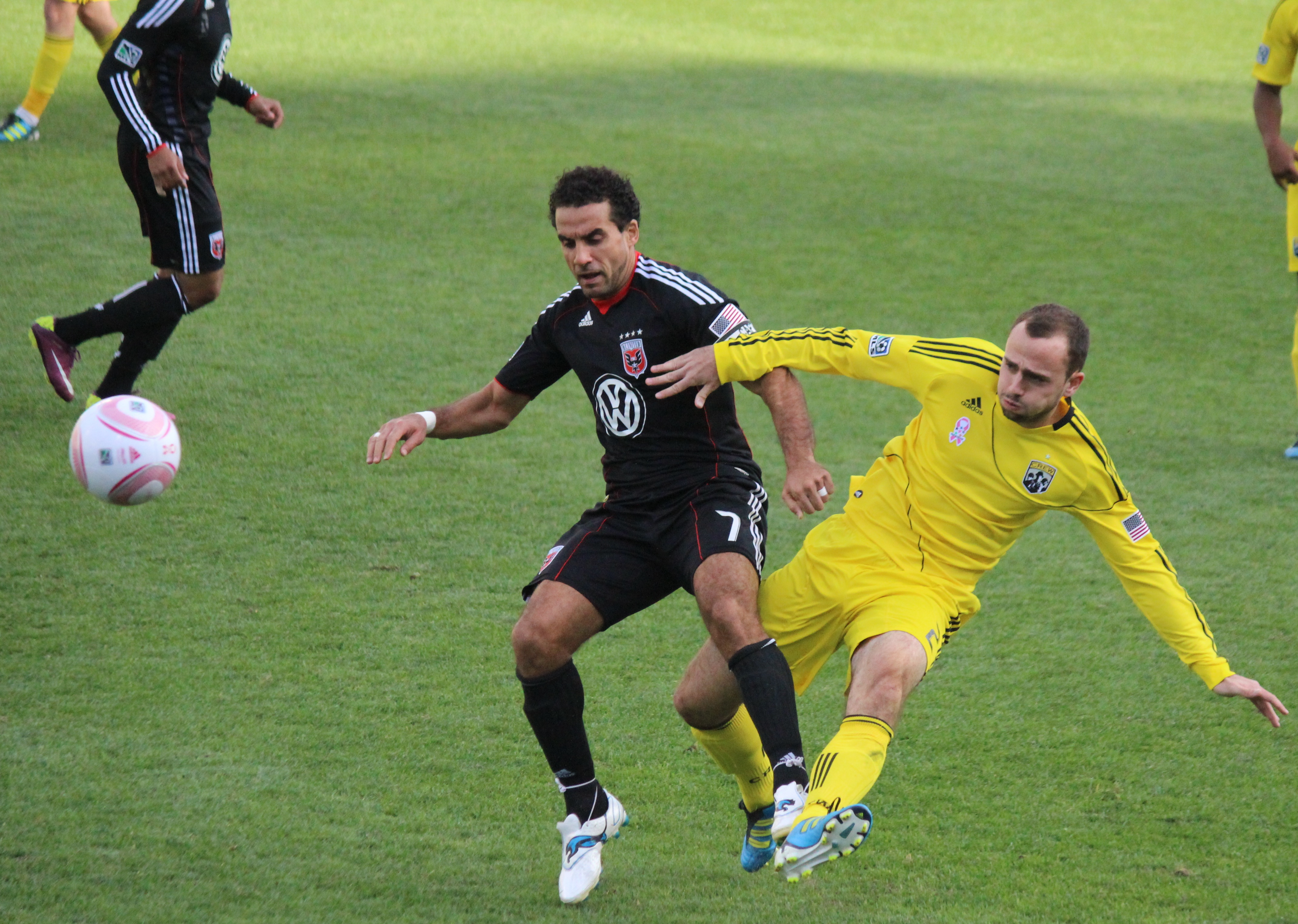
Balchan challenging Dwayne De Rosario in a 2011 regular season match

== International ==
Balchan played with United States U-20 National Team in early 2008, and was later a part of a U-20 squad which played England against reserve squads from Manchester United and Bolton Wanderers.
