= Olmes García =

Colombian footballer (born 1991)

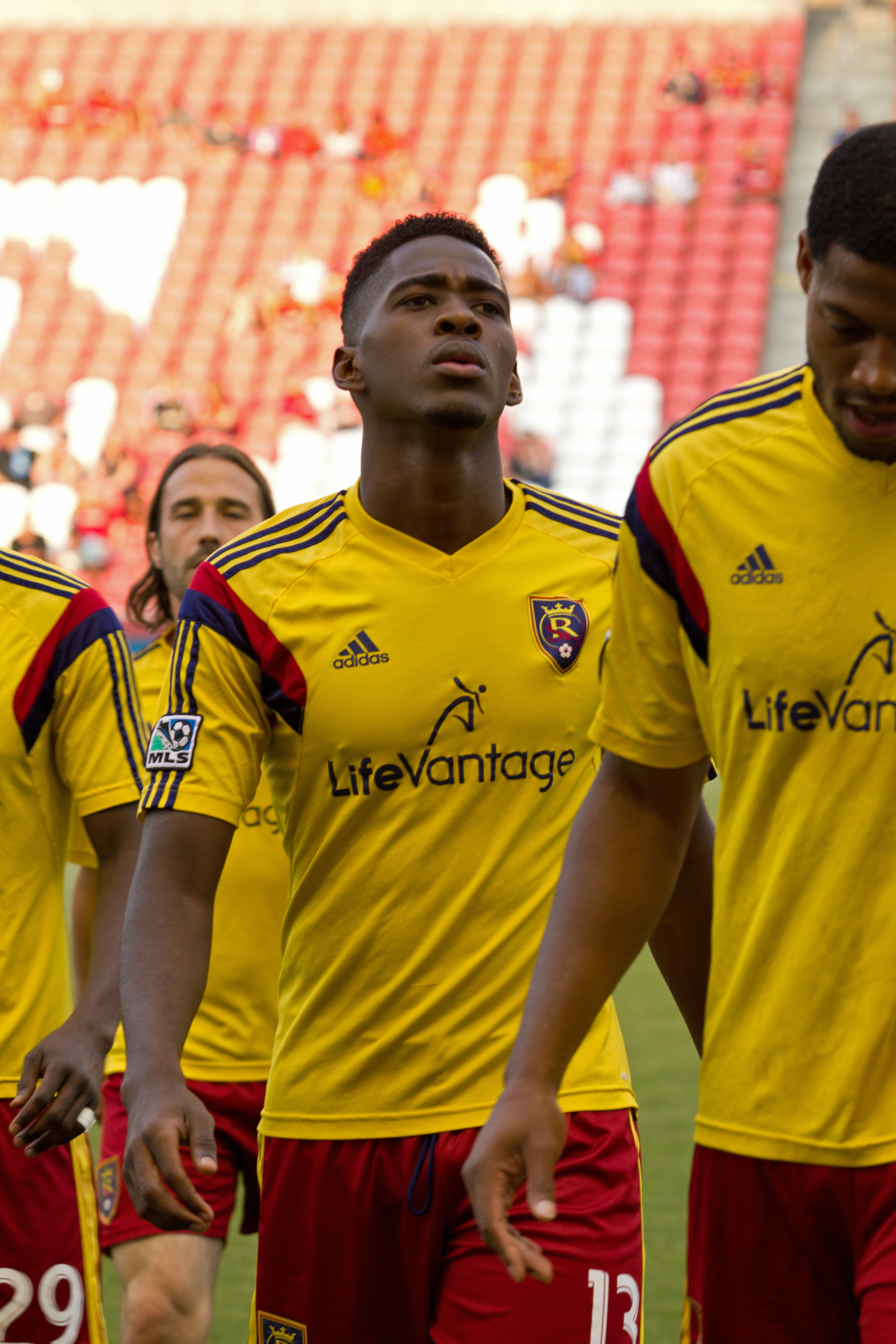
- García with Real Salt Lake in 2014

Personal information
- Full name: Olmes Fernando García Flórez
- Date of birth: 3 March 1991 (age 35)
- Place of birth: Barranquilla, Colombia
- Height: 6 ft 0 in (1.83 m)
- Position: Forward

Team information
- Current team: Royal Pari

Youth career
- Deportes Quindio

Senior career*
Years	Team	Apps	(Gls)
2011–2012	Deportes Quindio	47	(7)
2013–2016	Real Salt Lake	104	(13)
2016	→ Real Monarchs (loan)	5	(0)
2017–2019	América de Cali	21	(4)
2018	→ Oviedo (loan)	0	(0)
2018–2019	→ Jaguares de Córdoba (loan)	17	(2)
2019–2023	Deportes Quindio		
2023	Namdhari	2	(0)
2024–	Royal Pari	0	(0)
- * Club domestic league appearances and goals as of 23:11, 6 November 2023 (UTC)

Olmes Fernando García Flórez (born 3 March 1991) is a Colombian footballer who plays as a forward for Bolivian Primera División club Royal Pari.

== Club career ==
The Choco native began his career in the youth ranks of Deportes Quindio. In 2011, he made his debut in the Colombian First Division. In his first year with the club the young Colombian made 14 league appearances and scored two goals. In 2012, he made 33 league appearances for Quindio and scored five goals.

On 21 February 2013, García signed a contract with Real Salt Lake in Major League Soccer after being sold to the American side. He scored his first goal for Salt Lake in an away game in Vancouver on 13 April.

García was released by Salt Lake at the end of the 2016 season, but was selected by San Jose Earthquakes in the 2016 MLS Re-Entry Draft Stage 2. He subsequently joined América de Cali in his home country.

On 24 January 2018, García was loaned to Spanish Segunda División side Real Oviedo for six months.
