= 2011 Real Salt Lake season =

American soccer team season

Real Salt Lake
2011 season
- Owner: SCP Worldwide
- Coach: Jason Kreis
- Stadium: Rio Tinto Stadium
- Major League Soccer: Conference: 3rd Overall: 3rd
- MLS Cup: Conference semi-finals
- U.S. Open Cup: Quarterfinals
- CONCACAF Champions League: Runners-up
- Highest home attendance: MLS: 20,762 vs. Chicago; CCL: 20,738 vs. Monterrey
- Lowest home attendance: MLS: 14,365 vs. Chivas USA; CCL: 15,405 vs. Columbus
- Average home league attendance: 17,594
- Biggest win: RSL 4–0 SJ (7/23)
- Biggest defeat: VAN 3–0 RSL (10/6)
Home colors	Away colors	Third colors

The 2011 Real Salt Lake season was the club's seventh year of existence, as well as their seventh season in Major League Soccer, and their seventh consecutive season in the top-flight of American soccer.

Salt Lake's season was highlighted by reaching the 2011 CONCACAF Champions League Finals, becoming the first American soccer club to reach the final of the newly designed CONCACAF Champions League, as well as the first non-Mexican club to reach the finals. Including the predecessor tournament, the Champions' Cup, it was the first time in 11 years an American club reached the North American club final, the last being Los Angeles Galaxy. Additionally, Salt Lake finished third place in both the Western Conference and overall MLS tables during the regular season, thus earning a berth into the 2012–13 CONCACAF Champions League. In the 2011 MLS Cup Playoffs, Salt Lake reached the Western Conference Final, but fell to eventual MLS Cup champions, Los Angeles Galaxy. Salt Lake also reached the quarterfinals of the 2011 U.S. Open Cup before falling to eventual semifinalists, FC Dallas.

== Review ==
=== November ===
Towards the end of November 2010, Major League Soccer held its Expansion Draft for the arrivals of Portland Timbers and Vancouver Whitecaps FC. Among Salt Lake's unprotected players for the draft, Portland selected two: Robbie Findley and David Horst. Findley, though, following an expired contract with the Royals, declared his intentions to play overseas, with rumors circulating about him possibly playing for Danish Superliga clubs Brøndby and Randers, Premier League club Wolverhampton, even Championship club Nottingham Forest. On November 24, Randers denied rumors that Findley was on trial with the club.

Subsequent to the expansion draft, the Royals made a trade with the Timbers to bring in Salvadorian Arturo Alvarez, whom previously played his club soccer for San Jose Earthquakes, in return for allocation money and draft picks.

=== December ===
After much anticipation, Salt Lake agreed to buy striker Alvaro Saborio on loan from the Swiss club Sion on December 1, for a fee of around $1.0M. Saborío, spent the 2010 season on loan with the Royals where he scored 12 league goals and bagged six Champions League goals. He will sign as a Designated Player being the first in club history.

After much rumor as to where striker Robbie Findley would end up, he eventually signed for English Championship club Nottingham Forest, making Findley the first RSL player to leave for Europe since Yura Movsisyan went to Randers. Findley signed with Forest on December 23. The contract was reported to be for 2.5 years through the end of the 2012-13 English football season.

=== January ===
The club met in late January to begin preparations for the first leg of the Champions League quarterfinal vs. Columbus on February 22.

=== February ===
Salt Lake spent the month of February in preparations for their Champions League semifinal. Prior to the match, they played two final tune up games against Vancouver Whitecaps FC and Chivas USA.

In their quarterfinal away fixture, in the frigid cold, 25 degrees, RSL drew Columbus 0-0.

=== April ===
Salt Lake opened April with a semifinal fixture on the road to Saprissa. The match, played on April 5, ended in a 2–1 victory for Saprissa, although Salt Lake would win 3–2 on aggregate, secured by Jamison Olave's half volley in the 71st minute of play.

The win booked Salt Lake a spot in the Champions League finals, in which they became the first American team to make the finals under the current format, as well as the first American team to make the finals of a CONCACAF club tournament since Los Angeles Galaxy in 2000. On April 6, it was learned that Salt Lake would be playing Monterrey of Mexico in the Champions League finals, after Monterrey pulled off a 2–1 aggregate win over Cruz Azul.

On April 9, the club would return to league play, flying out to Boston to take on New England Revolution. Because of the Champions League match three days earlier, many first team players rested this weekend and mainly a team composed of reserves and a few starters played in the game. In spite of this, Salt Lake was able to pull off a 2–0 win at New England, giving them a perfect 3-0-0 record.

Following the New England match, the club had another mid-week fixture against Rocky Mountain rivals, Colorado Rapids. Due to the club's recent success in 2011, the match was expected to be hotly contested. A crowd of nearly 15,500 showed up for the mid-week game as Salt Lake pulled off a controversial, late goal in injury time. The goal was scored by Fabián Espíndola.

Originally, Salt Lake was to host Philadelphia Union on April 23, but the Union voluntarily rescheduled their match to September 3. The Union rescheduled the match to help aid Salt Lake in their Champions League campaign.

On April 20, Salt Lake resumed Champions League play with the first leg of the 2011 CONCACAF Champions League Finals being held at Monterrey's Technology Stadium. Salt Lake found themselves trailing within the first 20 minutes of play, following a defensive mishap that led to a loose ball tapped in by Aldo de Nigris. The Claret and Cobalt would draw level in the 35th minute of play, thanks to a header off of Nat Borchers from a Javier Morales set piece, leading to a 1-1 scoreline at halftime. In the second half of play, a 62nd minute handball from Salt Lake defender Jamison Olave consequently led to a penalty kick for Los Rayados. Chilean international Humberto Suazo converted the penalty, regaining the lead for Monterrey, 2–1. In the dying minutes of the match, Salt Lake midfielder, Morales, made two cutbacks over Monterrey defenders Sergio Pérez and Neri Cardozo to score the equalizer, leading to a final scoreline of 2-2.

The draw against Monterrey resulted in only the fourth time in history that an American soccer club had tied a Mexican opponent on Mexican soil. The previous time was when D.C. United tied Toluca 1–1 in the 2009–10 edition of the Champions League. The result brings American club performance in Mexico to (0-21-4) and MLS club performance in Mexico to (0-23-6). Salt Lake will host Monterrey in the second leg of the finals on April 27 at Rio Tinto Stadium.

== Match results ==
Win Tie Loss

=== Preseason ===
Note: Results are given with Real Salt Lake's score listed first.

Game	Date	Location	Opponent	Result F–A	Attendance	RSL Goalscorers
1	February 1, 2011	N	Whitecaps FC	1–2	closed door	Alvarez 49'
2	February 8, 2011	N	Sounders FC	3–3	closed door	Warner 87' 97' 99'
3	February 15, 2011	N	Chivas USA	2–0	closed door	Olave 64', Johnson 81'
4	March 9, 2011	N	Sporting	2–2	closed door	Saborío 28', Espíndola 48'
5	March 11, 2011	N	Sporting	1–0	closed door	Paulo Jr. 28'

=== Major League Soccer ===
==== Regular season ====
Win Tie Loss

March 19, 2011	San Jose Earthquakes	0–1	Real Salt Lake	Santa Clara, California
19:30 PDT	Cronin (yellow card) 6'; Leitch (yellow card) 37'; Stephenson (yellow card) 46'	Report	Espíndola (yellow card) 60'; Beckerman 63'	Stadium: Buck Shaw Stadium; Attendance: 10,525 (SO); Referee: Baldomero Toledo

March 26, 2011	Real Salt Lake	4–1	Los Angeles Galaxy	Sandy, Utah
18:00 PDT	Williams 2'; Morales 10' (pen.), 41'; Paulo Jr. 68'	Report	Saunders (yellow card) 9'; Beckham (yellow card) 54'; López (yellow card) 54'; Leonardo (yellow card) 74'; Ángel 80'	Stadium: Rio Tinto Stadium; Attendance: 20,507 (SO); Referee: Jair Marrufo

April 9, 2011	New England Revolution	0–2	Real Salt Lake	Foxborough, Massachusetts
19:30		Report	Schuler 27'; Araujo Jr. 47'	Stadium: Gillette Stadium; Attendance: 7,970; Referee: Jasen Anno

April 13, 2011	Real Salt Lake	1–0	Colorado Rapids	Sandy, Utah
19:30	Morales (yellow card) 32'; Espíndola 93+'	1–0 Report	(yellow card) 59' Marshall; (yellow card) 82' Wynne	Stadium: Rio Tinto Stadium; Attendance: 15,513; Referee: Baldomero Toledo

April 30, 2011	Portland Timbers	1–0	Real Salt Lake	Portland, Oregon
19:30 PDT	Cooper 22'	0–1 Report		Stadium: Jeld-Wen Field; Attendance: 18,627 (SO); Referee: Jair Marrufo (United States)

May 7, 2011	Real Salt Lake	1–0	Chivas USA	Sandy, Utah
13:00	Johnson 87'	1–0 Report	Boyens (yellow card) 15' (yellow-red card) 24'; Mondaini (red card) 37'	Stadium: Rio Tinto Stadium; Attendance: 14,365; Referee: Paul Ward

May 14, 2011	Real Salt Lake	0–0	Houston Dynamo	Sandy, Utah
20:30		0–0 Report		Stadium: Rio Tinto Stadium; Attendance: 16,301; Referee: Abbey Okulaja

May 22, 2011	FC Dallas	0–0	Real Salt Lake	Frisco, Texas
18:00 CDT	Jacobson (yellow card) 53'	Report	(yellow card) 44' Wingert; (yellow card) 58' Beckerman; (yellow card) 61' Grabavoy	Stadium: Pizza Hut Park; Attendance: 10,550; Referee: David Gantar

May 28, 2011	Real Salt Lake	1–2	Seattle Sounders FC	Sandy, Utah
19:00 MDT	Johnson (yellow card) 28'; Olave (red card) 58'; Wingert (yellow card) 65'; Gonzalez 88'	(Report)	Ianni 71'; Riley (yellow card) 81'; Neagle 84'; Wahl (yellow card) 90'	Stadium: Rio Tinto Stadium; Attendance: 14,474; Referee: Mark Kadlecik

June 4, 2011	Real Salt Lake	2–0	Vancouver Whitecaps FC	Sandy, Utah
18:00 PDT	Warner (yellow card) 30'; Alexandre 32'; Espíndola 79'	Report	DeMerit (yellow card) 15'; Koffie (yellow card) 66'	Stadium: Rio Tinto Stadium; Attendance: 15,174; Referee: Juan Guzman

June 8, 2011	Columbus Crew	2–1	Real Salt Lake	Columbus, Ohio
19:30 EDT	Mendoza 76' (pen.); Gardner 82'	Report	Olave 7'; Espindola (yellow card) 78'; Wingert (yellow card) 88'	Stadium: Crew Stadium; Attendance: 9,650; Referee: Ricardo Salazar

June 11, 2011	Philadelphia Union	1–1	Real Salt Lake	Chester, Pennsylvania
16:00 EDT	Daniel 24'	1–1 Report	Russell (yellow card) 43'; Espíndola 53'; Alexandre (yellow card) 54'	Stadium: PPL Park; Attendance: 18,728 (SO); Referee: Jorge Gonzalez

June 18, 2011	Real Salt Lake	1–1	D.C. United	Sandy, Utah
21:00 EDT	Espindola 38' (pen.)	1–1 Report	(yellow card) 65' Brettschneider; 85' (pen.) Davies	Stadium: Rio Tinto Stadium; Attendance: 16,841; Referee: Terry Vaughn

June 22, 2011	Chicago Fire	0–0	Real Salt Lake	Bridgeview, Illinois
19:30 CDT	Gibbs (yellow card) 3'; Barouch (yellow card) 64'	0–0 Report	Johnson (yellow card) 47+'; Russell (yellow card) 49'	Stadium: Toyota Park; Attendance: 14,972; Referee: Juan Guzman

June 25, 2011	Real Salt Lake	3–1	Toronto FC	Sandy, Utah
	Borchers 39'; Saborio 42'; Warner (yellow card) 48'; Saborio 60'; Alexandre (yellow card) 84'; Johnson (yellow card) 85'	(report)	Eckersley (yellow card) 58'; Maicon Santos 66'	Stadium: Rio Tinto Stadium; Attendance: 15,077; Referee: Niko Bratsis

July 4, 2011	Real Salt Lake	3–3	New England Revolution	Sandy, Utah
20:30 EDT	Johnson 23'; Saborío 55' (pen.); Espindola 82'	3-3 Report	Lekic 4' (pen.); Tierney 15'; Joseph 62'	Stadium: Rio Tinto Stadium; Attendance: 16,139; Referee: Yader Reyes

July 9, 2011	Real Salt Lake	2–0	FC Dallas	Sandy, Utah
20:00 CDT	Beckerman (yellow card) 29'; Williams 47'; Olave (yellow card) 67'; Rimando (yellow card) 93+'; Espindola 94+'	Report	(yellow card) 37' Gonçalves; (yellow card) 71' Shea; (yellow card) 90' Warshaw	Stadium: Rio Tinto Stadium; Attendance: 17,734; Referee: Ricardo Salazar

July 23, 2011	Real Salt Lake	4–0	San Jose Earthquakes	Sandy, Utah
19:00 PDT	Beckerman (yellow card) 13'; Saborío 63' (pen.); Saborío 75'; Beckerman 78'; Olave 83'	Report	Peterson (yellow card) 15'; Convey (yellow card) 32'; Ring (yellow card) 56'; Burling (red card) 60'	Stadium: Rio Tinto Stadium; Attendance: 19,429; Referee: David Gantar

July 30, 2011	Real Salt Lake	0–2	Columbus Crew	Sandy, Utah
21:00 EDT		Report	Gaven 5'; Heinemann 10'	Stadium: Rio Tinto Stadium; Attendance: 18,516; Referee: Jason Anno

August 3, 2011	Sporting Kansas City	2–0	Real Salt Lake	Kansas City, Kansas
19:30 CDT	Espinoza 29'; Bunbury 34'	0–2 Report		Stadium: Livestrong Sporting Park; Attendance: 18,467 (SO)

August 6, 2011	Real Salt Lake	3–0	New York Red Bulls	Sandy, Utah
21:00	Borchers 13'; Gil 44'; Saborio 77'; Johnson (yellow card) 84'	3–0 Report	(yellow card) 76' Márquez	Stadium: Rio Tinto Stadium; Attendance: 19,081; Referee: Elias Bazakos

August 13, 2011	Toronto FC	1–0	Real Salt Lake	Toronto, Ontario, Canada
	Plata 77'	Report	Johnson (yellow card) 54'; Espindola (yellow card) 62'	Stadium: BMO Field; Attendance: 21,644; Referee: Mark Kadlecik

August 20, 2011	Houston Dynamo	3–2	Real Salt Lake	Houston, Texas
19:30	Boswell 69'; Ching 47'; Dixon 93+'	2-3 Report	Espindola 28'; Gil 60'	Stadium: Robertson Stadium; Attendance: 16,247; Referee: Abiodun Okulaja

August 27, 2011	Chivas USA	0–1	Real Salt Lake	Carson, California
19:30	Lopes (yellow card) 79'	Report	Saborio 11'; Borchers (red card) 24'; Beckerman (yellow card) 74'	Stadium: The Home Depot Center; Attendance: 14,127; Referee: Kevin Stott

September 3, 2011	Real Salt Lake	2–1	Philadelphia Union	Sandy, Utah
19:00	Beckerman 18'; Schuler 26'; Russell (yellow card) 35'	2-1 Report	Le Toux 30'; Califf (yellow card) 67'	Stadium: Rio Tinto Stadium; Attendance: 18,720; Referee: Hilario Grajeda

September 10, 2011	Seattle Sounders FC	1–2	Real Salt Lake	Seattle, Washington
13:00 PDT	Carrasco (yellow card) 38'; Hurtado (red card) 39'; Montero 47+'; Alonso (yellow card) 94+'	Report	Keller 13' (o.g.); Beltran (yellow card) 20' (yellow-red card) 35'; Saborio 56'; Williams (yellow card) 68'	Stadium: CenturyLink Field; Attendance: 35,940; Referee: Mark Kadlecik

September 17, 2011	Real Salt Lake	1–0	Sporting Kansas City	Sandy, Utah
20:00 CDT	Schuler (yellow card) 12'; Borchers 54'; Beckerman (yellow card) 69'	Report	Collin (yellow card) 28'; Zusi (yellow card) 93+'	Stadium: Rio Tinto Stadium; Attendance: 19,888; Referee: Ricardo Salazar

September 21, 2011	New York Red Bulls	1–3	Real Salt Lake	Harrison, New Jersey
20:00	Rodgers (yellow card) 47'; Lindpere 69'	Report	Saborío 7'; Espíndola 11' 21'	Stadium: Red Bull Arena; Attendance: 14,266; Referee: Jorge Gonzalez

September 24, 2011	D.C. United	4–1	Real Salt Lake	Washington, D.C., United States
21:30	Najar 13'; De Rosario 22', 27', 31'	Report	(yellow card) 59' Warner; Saborio 85'	Stadium: RFK Stadium; Attendance: 16.367; Referee: Edvin Jurisevic

September 28, 2011	Real Salt Lake	0–3	Chicago	Sandy, Utah
20:00	Beckerman (red card) 11'; Espíndola (yellow card) 16'; Álvarez (yellow card) 56'	Report	Pappa 9', 36', 75'; Gargan (yellow card) 16'	Stadium: Rio Tinto Stadium; Attendance: 20.762; Referee: Baldomero Toledo

October 1, 2011	LA Galaxy	2–1	Real Salt Lake	Carson, California
19:30 PDT	Barrett 59'; Borchers 72' (o.g.)	Report	Espíndola 10'	Stadium: The Home Depot Center; Attendance: 27,000 (SO); Referee: Kevin Stott

October 6, 2011	Vancouver Whitecaps FC	3–0	Real Salt Lake	Vancouver, British Columbia, Canada
18:30 PDT	Camilo 44' (pen.); Camilo 53' (pen.); Khalfan 88'	Report		Stadium: BC Place; Attendance: 20,113; Referee: Chris Penso

October 14, 2011	Colorado Rapids	0–0	Real Salt Lake	Commerce City, Colorado
20:30		Report		Stadium: Dick's Sporting Goods Park; Attendance: 16,272; Referee: Ricardo Salazar

October 22, 2011	Real Salt Lake	1–1	Portland Timbers	Sandy, Utah
18:00 PDT				Stadium: Rio Tinto Stadium

==== Playoffs ====
October 29, 2011 Conference; Semi-finals	Real Salt Lake	3–0	Seattle Sounders FC	Sandy United States
20:00 MDT	Espindola (yellow card) 30'; Saborio 43', 53'; Grabavoy 88'		Alonso (yellow card) 54'; Montero (yellow card) 90'; Friberg (yellow card) 90+3'	Stadium: Rio Tinto Stadium; Referee: Mark Geiger

November 2, 2011 Conference; Semi-finals	Seattle Sounders FC	2–0 (2–3 agg.)	Real Salt Lake	Seattle Washington
20:00 MST	Alonso 56' (pen.); Neagle 61'			Stadium: CenturyLink Field; Attendance: 36,021; Referee: Jair Marrufo

November 6, 2011 Conference; Final	Los Angeles Galaxy	3 - 1	Real Salt Lake	Carson, California
18:00 PST	Donovan 23' (pen.); Magee 58'; Keane 68'	Report	Saborío 25'	Stadium: The Home Depot Center; Attendance: 23,437; Referee: Jorge Gonzalez

=== CONCACAF Champions League ===
February 22 Quarterfinals	Columbus Crew (United States)	0–0	(United States) Real Salt Lake	Columbus
20:00 UTC-05		(Report)		Stadium: Columbus Crew Stadium; Attendance: 4,665; Referee: Jair Marrufo (United States)

March 1 Quarterfinals	Real Salt Lake (United States)	4–1 (4–1 agg.)	(United States) Columbus Crew	Sandy
19:00 UTC-06	Saborío 23'; Morales 36', 77'; Williams 90+5'	(Report)	Mendoza 49'	Stadium: Rio Tinto Stadium; Attendance: 15,405; Referee: Mark Geiger (United States)

March 15 Semifinals	Real Salt Lake (United States)	2–0	(Costa Rica) Saprissa	Sandy
19:00 UTC-05	Saborío 9'; Espíndola 57'	(Report)		Stadium: Rio Tinto Stadium; Attendance: 16,668; Referee: Enrico Wijngaarde (Suriname)

April 5 Semifinals	Saprissa (Costa Rica)	2–1 (2–3 agg.)	(United States) Real Salt Lake	San José, Costa Rica
20:00 UTC-06	Cordero 46'; Solís 87' (pen.)	(Report)	Olave 61'	Stadium: Estadio Ricardo Saprissa Aymá; Attendance: 21,065; Referee: Marco Antonio Rodríguez (Mexico)

April 20 Final	Monterrey (Mexico)	2–2	(United States) Real Salt Lake	Monterrey, Mexico
21:00 UTC-05	de Nigris 18'; Suazo 62' (pen.)	(Report)	Borchers 35'; Morales 89'	Stadium: Estadio Tecnológico; Attendance: 30,247; Referee: Joel Aguilar (El Salvador)

April 27 Final	Real Salt Lake (United States)	0–1 (2–3 agg.)	(Mexico) Monterrey	Sandy
20:00 UTC-06		(Report)	Suazo 45'	Stadium: Rio Tinto Stadium; Attendance: 20,738; Referee: Roberto Moreno (Panama)

=== U.S. Open Cup ===
June 28, 2011 Third Round	(Utah) Real Salt Lake	2–0	(North Carolina) Wilmington Hammerheads	Sandy, Utah
19:00 MDT	Beltran 40'; Alexandre 44'	Report		Stadium: Rio Tinto Stadium; Attendance: 7,620; Referee: Allen Chapman

July 12, 2011 Quarterfinals	(Texas) FC Dallas	2–0	(Utah) Real Salt Lake	Frisco, Texas
20:00 CDT	Benítez 18'; Jackson 54'	Report		Stadium: Pizza Hut Park; Referee: Michael Kennedy

== Major League Soccer ==
=== League tables ===
==== Western Conference table ====
Pos	Team	Pld	W	L	T	GF	GA	GD	Pts	Qualification
1	LA Galaxy	34	19	5	10	48	28	+20	67	MLS Cup Conference Semifinals
2	Seattle Sounders FC	34	18	7	9	56	37	+19	63	MLS Cup Conference Semifinals
3	Real Salt Lake	34	15	11	8	44	36	+8	53	MLS Cup Conference Semifinals
4	FC Dallas	34	15	12	7	42	39	+3	52	MLS Cup Play-In Round
5	Colorado Rapids	34	12	9	13	46	42	+4	49	MLS Cup Play-In Round
6	Portland Timbers	34	11	14	9	40	48	−8	42	
7	San Jose Earthquakes	34	8	12	14	40	45	−5	38	
8	Chivas USA	34	8	14	12	41	43	−2	36	
9	Vancouver Whitecaps FC	34	6	18	10	35	55	−20	28	

Source: MLS

==== Overall table ====
Pos	Team	Pld	W	L	T	GF	GA	GD	Pts	Qualification
1	LA Galaxy (S, C)	34	19	5	10	48	28	+20	67	CONCACAF Champions League
2	Seattle Sounders FC	34	18	7	9	56	37	+19	63	CONCACAF Champions League
3	Real Salt Lake	34	15	11	8	44	36	+8	53	CONCACAF Champions League
4	FC Dallas	34	15	12	7	42	39	+3	52	
5	Sporting Kansas City	34	13	9	12	50	40	+10	51	
6	Houston Dynamo	34	12	9	13	45	41	+4	49	CONCACAF Champions League
7	Colorado Rapids	34	12	9	13	44	41	+3	49	
8	Philadelphia Union	34	11	8	15	44	36	+8	48	
9	Columbus Crew	34	13	13	8	43	44	−1	47	
10	New York Red Bulls	34	10	8	16	50	44	+6	46	
11	Chicago Fire	34	9	9	16	46	45	+1	43	
12	Portland Timbers	34	11	14	9	40	48	−8	42	
13	D.C. United	34	9	13	12	49	52	−3	39	
14	San Jose Earthquakes	34	8	12	14	40	45	−5	38	
15	Chivas USA	34	8	14	12	41	43	−2	36	
16	Toronto FC	34	6	13	15	36	59	−23	33	CONCACAF Champions League
17	New England Revolution	34	5	16	13	38	58	−20	28	
18	Vancouver Whitecaps FC	34	6	18	10	35	55	−20	28	

Source: MLS
Rules for classification: 1) points; 2) head-to-head record; 3) goal difference; 4) number of goals scored
(C) Champions; (S) Supporters' Shield

==== Results summary ====
Overall								Home						Away					
Pld	Pts	W	L	D	GF	GA	GD	W	L	D	GF	GA	GD	W	L	D	GF	GA	GD
31	51	15	10	6	43	32	+11	10	3	3	28	14	+14	5	7	3	15	18	−3

Source: MLSSoccer.com
Pld = Matches played; Pts = Points; W = Matches won; D = Matches drawn; L = Matches lost; GF = Goals for; GA = Goals against; GD = Goal difference

== Club ==
=== Roster ===
==== MLS roster ====
As of September 15, 2011.

Note: Flags indicate national team as defined under FIFA eligibility rules; some limited exceptions apply. Players may hold more than one non-FIFA nationality.

No.	Pos.	Nation	Player
1	GK	USA	Tim Melia
2	DF	USA	Tony Beltran
3	DF	GHA	Robbie Russell
4	DF	COL	Jámison Olave
5	MF	USA	Kyle Beckerman (captain)
6	DF	USA	Nat Borchers
7	FW	ARG	Fabián Espíndola
8	FW	CAN	Will Johnson
10	MF	SLV	Arturo Alvarez
11	MF	ARG	Javier Morales
12	MF	HAI	Jean Alexandre
13	FW	USA	Chris Agorsor
14	MF	CUB	Yordany Álvarez (on loan from Orlando City)
15	FW	CRC	Álvaro Saborío

No.	Pos.	Nation	Player
17	DF	USA	Chris Wingert
18	GK	USA	Nick Rimando
19	DF	USA	Blake Wagner
20	MF	USA	Ned Grabavoy
21	MF	USA	Luis Gil
22	MF	ARG	Nelson González (on loan from Quilmes)
23	FW	BRA	Paulo Araujo Jr. (on loan from Fort Lauderdale Strikers)
24	GK	USA	Kyle Reynish
25	FW	USA	Donny Toia
26	MF	USA	Collen Warner
27	FW	USA	Cody Arnoux
28	DF	USA	Chris Schuler
30	DF	USA	Rauwshan McKenzie
77	MF	JAM	Andy Williams

==== CONCACAF Champions League roster ====
As of February 22, 2011.

Note: Flags indicate national team as defined under FIFA eligibility rules; some limited exceptions apply. Players may hold more than one non-FIFA nationality.

No.	Pos.	Nation	Player
1	GK	USA	Tim Melia
2	DF	USA	Tony Beltran
3	DF	GHA	Robbie Russell
4	DF	COL	Jámison Olave
5	MF	USA	Kyle Beckerman (captain)
6	DF	USA	Nat Borchers
7	FW	ARG	Fabián Espíndola
8	FW	CAN	Will Johnson
10	MF	SLV	Arturo Alvarez
11	MF	ARG	Javier Morales
12	MF	HAI	Jean Alexandre

No.	Pos.	Nation	Player
15	FW	CRC	Álvaro Saborío
17	DF	USA	Chris Wingert
18	GK	USA	Nick Rimando
20	MF	USA	Ned Grabavoy
21	MF	USA	Luis Gil
22	MF	ARG	Nelson González (on loan from Quilmes)
23	FW	BRA	Paulo Araujo Jr. (on loan from Fort Lauderdale Strikers)
24	GK	USA	Kyle Reynish
28	DF	USA	Chris Schuler
30	DF	USA	Rauwshan McKenzie
77	MF	JAM	Andy Williams

=== Staff ===
==== Coaching staff ====
Position	Staff
General Manager	(United States) Garth Lagerwey
Head coach	(United States) Jason Kreis
Assistant coach	(United States) C. J. Brown
Assistant coach	(United States) Miles Joseph
Assistant coach	(United States) Jeff Cassar
Strength and conditioning Coach	(United States) Dan Barlow
Team Administrator	(United States) Elliot Fall
Equipment Manager	(United States) Mike Rigby
Assistant Equipment Manager	(United States) Trevor Richards
Head Athletic Trainer	(United States) Tyson Pace
Head Team Physician	(United States) Andrew Cooper
Team Orthopedist	(United States) Dr. Mark Scholl
U-17 Head Coach	(United States) Greg Maas
U-17 Assistant Coach	(Bosnia and Herzegovina) Nermin Sasivarĕvić

Updated to match played 20 October 2010
Source: Real Salt Lake

==== Management ====
Owner/Chairman	(United States) Dave Checketts
President	(United States) Bill Manning
Chief Financial Officer	(United States) Gary Reimer
Sporting Director and Director of Youth Development	(United States) Rob Karas
Ground (capacity and dimensions)	Rio Tinto Stadium (20,008 / 103x67 meters)

Updated to match played 20 October 2010
Source: Real Salt Lake

=== Kits ===
Home	Away	Third	Third Alternate

Type	Shirt	Shorts	Socks	First appearance / Info
Home	Claret / Cobalt sleeves	Claret	Claret	
Away	White / Cobalt sleeves	White	White	
Third	Gold / Cobalt sleeves	Gold	Claret	
Third Alt.	Gold / Cobalt sleeves	Gold	Cobalt	MLS, May 22 against Dallas

== Statistics ==
=== Appearances and goals ===
Last updated on 18 August 2011.

No.	Pos	Nat	Player	Total		MLS		CONCACAF Champions League		U.S. Open Cup	
No.	Pos	Nat	Player	Apps	Goals	Apps	Goals	Apps	Goals	Apps	Goals
1	GK	(United States) USA	Tim Melia	0	0	0+0	0	0+0	0	0+0	0
2	DF	(United States) USA	Tony Beltran	2	0	0+0	0	2+0	0	0+0	0
3	DF	(Ghana) GHA	Robbie Russell	5	0	1+0	0	3+1	0	0+0	0
4	DF	(Colombia) COL	Jámison Olave	18	3	14+0	2	4+0	1	0+0	0
5	MF	(United States) USA	Kyle Beckerman	26	2	20+2	2	4+0	0	0+0	0
6	DF	(United States) USA	Nat Borchers	22	2	19+0	2	3+0	0	0+0	0
7	FW	(Argentina) ARG	Fabián Espíndola	21	7	15+2	6	4+0	1	0+0	0
8	FW	(Canada) CAN	Will Johnson	21	2	15+2	2	4+0	0	0+0	0
10	MF	(El Salvador) SLV	Arturo Alvarez	13	0	5+6	0	0+2	0	0+0	0
11	MF	(Argentina) ARG	Javier Morales	9	4	5+0	2	4+0	2	0+0	0
12	DF	(Haiti) HAI	Jean Alexandre	15	1	8+6	1	0+1	0	0+0	0
15	FW	(Costa Rica) CRC	Álvaro Saborío	17	8	13+0	6	4+0	2	0+0	0
16	FW	(United States) USA	Conor Chinn	0	0	0+0	0	0+0	0	0+0	0
17	DF	(United States) USA	Chris Wingert	20	0	16+1	0	3+0	0	0+0	0
18	GK	(United States) USA	Nick Rimando	25	0	21+0	0	4+0	0	0+0	0
20	MF	(United States) USA	Ned Grabavoy	23	0	18+1	0	1+3	0	0+0	0
21	MF	(United States) USA	Luis Gil	15	1	6+9	1	0+0	0	0+0	0
22	MF	(Argentina) ARG	Nelson González	3	1	2+1	1	0+0	0	0+0	0
23	FW	(Brazil) BRA	Paulo Araujo Jr.	6	2	2+3	2	0+1	0	0+0	0
24	GK	(United States) USA	Kyle Reynish	1	0	1+0	0	0+0	0	0+0	0
25	FW	(United States) USA	Donny Toia	0	0	0+0	0	0+0	0	0+0	0
26	MF	(United States) USA	Collen Warner	18	0	10+8	0	0+0	0	0+0	0
27	FW	(United States) USA	Cody Arnoux	0	0	0+0	0	0+0	0	0+0	0
28	DF	(United States) USA	Chris Schuler	13	1	10+1	1	1+1	0	0+0	0
30	DF	(United States) USA	Rauwshan McKenzie	1	0	1+0	0	0+0	0	0+0	0
77	MF	(Jamaica) JAM	Andy Williams	24	3	12+8	2	3+1	1	0+0	0

==== Disciplinary record ====
No.	Pos.	Nat.	Player	Yellow card	Yellow card Red card	Red card
1	GK	(United States)	Tim Melia	0	0	0
24	GK	(United States)	Kyle Reynish	0	0	0
18	GK	(United States)	Nick Rimando	0	0	0
2	DF	(United States)	Tony Beltran	0	0	0
5	DF	(United States)	Nat Borchers	0	0	1
30	DF	(United States)	Rauwshan McKenzie	0	0	0
4	DF	(Colombia)	Jámison Olave	1	0	0
3	DF	(Ghana)	Robbie Russell	0	0	0
28	DF	(United States)	Chris Schuler	0	0	0
17	DF	(United States)	Chris Wingert	0	0	0
13	MF	(Haiti)	Jean Alexandre	0	0	0
10	MF	(El Salvador)	Arturo Alvarez	0	0	0
5	MF	(United States)	Kyle Beckerman	1	0	0
21	MF	(United States)	Luis Gil	0	0	0
22	MF	(Argentina)	Nelson González	0	0	0
20	MF	(United States)	Ned Grabavoy	0	0	0
11	MF	(Argentina)	Javier Morales	1	0	0
26	MF	(United States)	Collen Warner	0	0	0
77	MF	(Jamaica)	Andy Williams	0	0	0
23	FW	(Brazil)	Paulo Araujo Jr.	0	0	0
7	FW	(Argentina)	Fabián Espíndola	0	0	0
8	FW	(Canada)	Will Johnson	0	0	1
15	FW	(Costa Rica)	Álvaro Saborío	0	0	0
16	FW	(United States)	Conor Chinn	0	0	0
25	FW	(United States)	Donny Toia	0	0	0
27	FW	(United States)	Cody Arnoux	0	0	0

Last updated on March 2, 2011

== Player movement ==
=== Transfers ===
==== In ====
Date	Player	Position	Previous club	Fee/notes	Ref
November 24, 2010	(El Salvador) Arturo Alvarez	MF	(United States) Portland Timbers	Acquired for SuperDraft 2nd round pick	
December 1, 2010	(Costa Rica) Álvaro Saborío	FW	(Switzerland) Sion	Reported fee of US$1.0 million	
February 11, 2011	(United States) Cody Arnoux	FW	(Canada) Vancouver Whitecaps	Weighted lottery	
March 14, 2011	(United States) Donny Toia	FW	(United States) Pima College	Homegrown Player	
March 24, 2011	(United States) Conor Chinn	FW	(United States) New York Red Bulls	Free	
May 27, 2011	(Armenia) Artur Aghasyan	FW	Unattached	Free	
July 20, 2011	(United States) Chris Agorsor	FW	(United States) Philadelphia Union	Free	
August 16, 2011	(United States) Blake Wagner	DF	(Canada) Vancouver Whitecaps FC	Free	
September 15, 2011	(United States) Nico Muñiz	MF	(United States) Real Salt Lake Academy	Free; not eligible for first-team roster until 2012	

==== Out ====
Date	Player	Position	Destination club	Fee/notes	Ref
November 24, 2010	(United States) Robbie Findley	FW	(United States) Portland Timbers	Expansion Draft	
November 24, 2010	(United States) David Horst	DF	(United States) Portland Timbers	Expansion Draft	
November 24, 2010	(United States) Alex Nimo	MF		Waived	
February 28, 2011	(Brazil) Pablo Campos	FW	(United States) Carolina RailHawks	Waived, free transfer	
May 27, 2011	(United States) Conor Chinn	FW	(United States) Atlanta Silverbacks	Waived, free transfer	
July 28, 2011	(Armenia) Artur Aghasyan	FW	(United States) Los Angeles Blues	Released, free transfer	

=== Loan ===
==== In ====
Date	Player	Position	Loaned from	Fee/notes	Ref
July 12, 2010	(Argentina) Nelson González	MF	(Argentina) Quilmes	Loan thru 2011 season	
December 27, 2010	(Brazil) Paulo Araujo Jr.	FW	(United States) Fort Lauderdale Strikers	Loan thru 2011 season with RSL purchase option at season's end	
September 15, 2011	(Cuba) Yordany Álvarez	MF	(United States) Orlando City	Loan thru remainder of 2011 MLS season	

== Competitions ==
Competition	Started round	Current position / round	Final position / round	First match	Last match
MLS	—	1st		March 19, 2011	October 22, 2011
MLS Western Conference	—	1st		March 19, 2011	October 22, 2011
CONCACAF Champions League	Group stage	Finals	Finals	August 22, 2010	April 27, 2011
U.S. Open Cup	Third round	Quarter-finals			

Updated to match played 11 July 2011
Source: Competitions

== Miscellany ==
=== Allocation ranking ===
Real Salt Lake is in the #8 position in the MLS Allocation Ranking. The allocation ranking is the mechanism used to determine which MLS club has first priority to acquire a U.S. National Team player who signs with MLS after playing abroad, or a former MLS player who returns to the league after having gone to a club abroad for a transfer fee. A ranking can be traded, provided that part of the compensation received in return is another club's ranking.

=== International roster spots ===
Real Salt Lake possesses 6 international roster spots. Each club in Major League Soccer is allocated 8 international roster spots, which can be traded. The club dealt one spot permanently to Colorado Rapids on 29 June 2005 and dealt another spot permanently to Chivas USA on 24 November 2004. The club also dealt a spot to Kansas City on 23 February 2010 but use of that roster spot was for the 2010 season only.

There is no limit on the number of international slots on each club's roster. The remaining roster slots must belong to domestic players. For clubs based in the United States, a domestic player is either a U.S. citizen, a permanent resident (green card holder) or the holder of other special status (e.g., refugee or asylum status).

=== Future draft pick trades ===
Future picks acquired: 2012 SuperDraft conditional pick acquired from Chivas USA.
Future picks traded: None.

=== MLS rights to other players ===
Real Salt Lake maintains the MLS rights to Yura Movsisyan after the player declined a contract offer by the club and signed overseas on a free transfer.
