= 2011 CONCACAF Champions League final =

- Event: 2010–11 CONCACAF Champions League
Monterrey	Real Salt Lake
(Mexico)	(United States)
3	2
- on aggregate

First leg
Monterrey	Real Salt Lake
2	2
- Date: April 20, 2011
- Venue: Estadio Tecnológico, Monterrey
- Referee: Joel Aguilar (El Salvador)
- Attendance: 30,247

Second leg
Real Salt Lake	Monterrey
0	1
- Date: April 27, 2011
- Venue: Rio Tinto Stadium, Sandy
- Referee: Roberto Moreno (Panama)
- Attendance: 20,378

The 2011 CONCACAF Champions League final was the final of the 2010–11 CONCACAF Champions League, and the third final of the current format of the CONCACAF Champions League. The match was contested in a two-leg aggregate format between April 20–27, 2011.

The winners earned the right to represent CONCACAF at the 2011 FIFA Club World Cup, entering at the quarterfinal stage.

== Background ==
Mexican side Monterrey is the only team in the tournament that remains undefeated with an accumulated record of 8 victories and 2 draws.

American side Real Salt Lake is the first MLS team to reach the final of the tournament since the 2000 edition, where Los Angeles Galaxy was crowned champion.

The 2011 final was the first Champions League final, under its current format, that did not feature an all-Mexican final. Additionally, this is the first time since 2000 that a U.S. team has made the final.

== Road to the final ==
(Mexico) Monterrey				Round	(United States) Real Salt Lake			
Bye				Preliminary round	Bye			
Opponent	Result			Group stage	Opponent	Result		
(Costa Rica) Saprissa	1–0 (H)			Matchday 1	(Panama) Árabe Unido	2–1 (H)		
(United States) Seattle Sounders FC	2–0 (A)			Matchday 2	(Mexico) Cruz Azul	4–5 (A)		
(Honduras) Marathón	2–0 (H)			Matchday 3	(Canada) Toronto FC	4–1 (H)		
(United States) Seattle Sounders FC	3–2 (H)			Matchday 4	(Panama) Árabe Unido	3–2 (A)		
(Costa Rica) Saprissa	2–2 (A)			Matchday 5	(Canada) Toronto FC	1–1 (A)		
(Honduras) Marathón	1–0 (A)			Matchday 6	(Mexico) Cruz Azul	3–1 (H)		
Group C winner: Team / Pld / W / D / L / GF / GA / GD / Pts; (Mexico) Monterrey / 6 / 5 / 1 / 0 / 11 / 4 / +7 / 16; (Costa Rica) Saprissa / 6 / 3 / 1 / 2 / 11 / 7 / +4 / 10; (Honduras) Marathón / 6 / 2 / 0 / 4 / 5 / 11 / −6 / 6; (United States) Seattle Sounders FC / 6 / 1 / 0 / 5 / 6 / 11 / −5 / 3				Final standings	Group A winner: Team / Pld / W / D / L / GF / GA / GD / Pts; (United States) Real Salt Lake / 6 / 4 / 1 / 1 / 17 / 11 / +6 / 13; (Mexico) Cruz Azul / 6 / 3 / 1 / 2 / 15 / 9 / +6 / 10; (Canada) Toronto FC / 6 / 2 / 2 / 2 / 5 / 7 / −2 / 8; (Panama) Árabe Unido / 6 / 1 / 0 / 5 / 4 / 14 / −10 / 3			
Opponent	Agg.	1st leg	2nd leg	Championship round	Opponent	Agg.	1st leg	2nd leg
(Mexico) Toluca	2–0	1–0 (A)	1–0 (H)	Quarterfinals	(United States) Columbus Crew	4–1	0–0 (A)	4–1 (H)
(Mexico) Cruz Azul	3–2	2–1 (H)	1–1 (A)	Semifinals	(Costa Rica) Saprissa	3–1	2–0 (H)	1–2 (A)

== Rules ==
Like other match-ups in the knockout round, the teams played two games, one at each team's home stadium. If the teams remained tied after 90 minutes of play during the 2nd leg, the away goals rule would be used, but not after a tie enters extra time, and so a tie would be decided by penalty shootout if the aggregate score is level after extra time.

== Final summary ==
=== First leg ===
April 20, 2011
21:00 UTC−05:00

Monterrey (Mexico)	2–2	(United States) Real Salt Lake
De Nigris 18'; Suazo 63' (pen.)	Report	Borchers 35'; Morales 89'

Estadio Tecnológico, Monterrey
Attendance: 30,247
Referee: Joel Aguilar (El Salvador)

Monterrey	Real Salt Lake

MONTERREY:
GK	1	(Mexico) Jonathan Orozco
DF	15	(Argentina) José María Basanta
DF	4	(Mexico) Ricardo Osorio
DF	24	(Mexico) Sergio Pérez
DF	21	(Mexico) Hiram Mier
MF	8	(Mexico) Luis Ernesto Pérez		(substituted off) 21'
MF	18	(Argentina) Neri Cardozo
MF	20	(Ecuador) Walter Ayoví
FW	9	(Mexico) Aldo de Nigris	(yellow card) 18'	(substituted off) 21'
FW	26	(Chile) Humberto Suazo
FW	11	(Mexico) Sergio Santana		(substituted off) 70'
Substitutes:
MF	17	(Mexico) Jesús Zavala	(yellow card) 72'	(substituted on) 21'
FW	10	(Paraguay) Osvaldo Martínez		(substituted on) 21'
FW	28	(Mexico) Jesús Arellano		(substituted on) 70'
Manager:
(Mexico) Victor Manuel Vucetich

REAL SALT LAKE:
GK	18	(United States) Nick Rimando
DF	3	(United States) Robbie Russell		(substituted off) 82'
DF	6	(United States) Nat Borchers
DF	17	(United States) Chris Wingert
DF	4	(Colombia) Jámison Olave
MF	5	(United States) Kyle Beckerman	(yellow card) 65'
MF	20	(United States) Ned Grabavoy		(substituted off) 61'
MF	8	(Canada) Will Johnson
MF	11	(Argentina) Javier Morales
FW	7	(Argentina) Fabián Espíndola
FW	15	(Costa Rica) Álvaro Saborío	(yellow card) 72'	(substituted off) 82'
Substitutes:
MF	77	(Jamaica) Andy Williams	(yellow card) 74'	(substituted on) 61'
DF	2	(United States) Tony Beltran		(substituted on) 82'
MF	10	(El Salvador) Arturo Alvarez		(substituted on) 82'
Manager:
(United States) Jason Kreis

Assistant referees:
(El Salvador) William Torres
(El Salvador) Juan Francisco Zumba
Fourth official:
(El Salvador) Elmer Bonilla

=== Second leg ===
April 27, 2011
20:00 UTC−06:00

Real Salt Lake (United States)	0–1	(Mexico) Monterrey
	Report	Suazo 45'

Rio Tinto Stadium, Sandy, Utah
Attendance: 20,378
Referee: Roberto Moreno (Panama)

Real Salt Lake	Monterrey

REAL SALT LAKE:
GK	18	(United States) Nick Rimando
DF	17	(United States) Chris Wingert
DF	6	(United States) Nat Borchers
DF	3	(United States) Robbie Russell		(substituted off) 46'
DF	4	(Colombia) Jámison Olave
MF	8	(Canada) Will Johnson
MF	20	(United States) Ned Grabavoy
MF	77	(Jamaica) Andy Williams		(substituted off) 64'
MF	11	(Argentina) Javier Morales
FW	15	(Costa Rica) Álvaro Saborío
FW	7	(Argentina) Fabián Espíndola	(yellow card) 30'	(substituted off) 85'
Substitutes:
DF	2	(United States) Tony Beltran		(substituted on) 46'
MF	10	(El Salvador) Arturo Alvarez		(substituted on) 64'
MF	10	(Brazil) Paulo Araujo Jr.		(substituted on) 85'
Manager:
(United States) Jason Kreis

MONTERREY:
GK	1	(Mexico) Jonathan Orozco
DF	15	(Argentina) José María Basanta
DF	24	(Mexico) Sergio Pérez	(yellow card) 42'
DF	6	(Mexico) Héctor Morales
DF	21	(Mexico) Hiram Mier
MF	4	(Mexico) Ricardo Osorio	(yellow card) 75'
MF	18	(Argentina) Neri Cardozo		(substituted off) 74'
MF	20	(Ecuador) Walter Ayoví
FW	10	(Paraguay) Osvaldo Martínez	(yellow card) 74'	(substituted off) 74'
FW	26	(Chile) Humberto Suazo	(yellow card) 90'
FW	11	(Mexico) Sergio Santana		(substituted off) 60'
Substitutes:
FW	13	(Mexico) Abraham Darío Carreño		(substituted on) 60'
DF	5	(Mexico) Duilio Davino		(substituted on) 74'
DF	2	(Mexico) Severo Meza		(substituted on) 77'
Manager:
(Mexico) Victor Manuel Vucetich

Assistant referees:
(Panama) Daniel Williamson
(Panama) Jaime Smith
Fourth official:
(Panama) Jafeth Perea
