= History of Real Salt Lake =

This article presents a detailed, year-by-year history of Real Salt Lake (2004–present). For other information about the professional soccer club based in Utah, please see the main article.

== 2004 ==
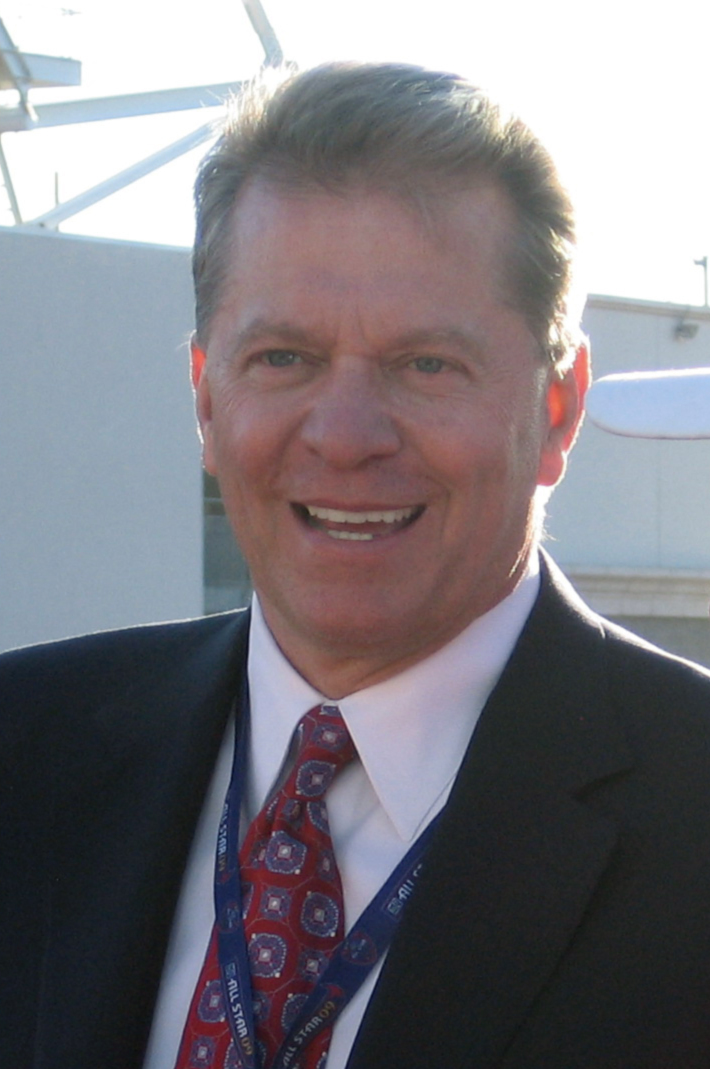
Dave Checketts, the founder of Real Salt Lake

On July 14, Major League Soccer officially awarded its 12th franchise to the state of Utah and ownership group SCP Worldwide, headed by Dave Checketts. Steve Pastorino was named general manager of the new team, and John Ellinger was hired as head coach. The team was officially named "Real Salt Lake" in October of that year in honor of Real Madrid.

== 2005 ==
The team played its first official match on April 2, slogging through a windy, rain-soaked contest against New York MetroStars at Giants Stadium in New Jersey. That match ended as a scoreless draw. The following week, Jason Kreis scored the first goal in franchise history in a 3–1 loss to LA Galaxy at the Home Depot Center. RSL returned to Utah to play its first-ever home match on April 16. With 25,287 fans present at Rice-Eccles Stadium, Brian Dunseth scored a header in the 81st minute to deliver a 1–0 victory over the rival Colorado Rapids.

In June, Salt Lake hosted a World Cup qualifier match between Team USA and Costa Rica, drawing a boisterous crowd of 40,586 fans for the double-header at Rice-Eccles Stadium.

== 2006 ==
In 2006, after much debate, the franchise secured a guarantee for a soccer-specific stadium to be built in Sandy, a suburb of Salt Lake City. The team broke ground for the structure on the morning of August 12, with representatives from soccer giant Real Madrid present, including David Beckham.

In September 2006, representatives from Real Salt Lake and Real Madrid signed a 10-year agreement in which the two clubs agreed to work together to promote soccer throughout both Utah and the United States. Among the provisions included in the deal were a biennial friendly match between the two teams in Salt Lake City; annual February training for the RSL squad at Real Madrid's practice facility in Spain, and the creation of a $25 million youth academy in Salt Lake City that would train up to 200 youth players ranging from ages 12 to 18. However, the deal has seemed to have been dissolved, as none of the agreed upon provisions have come true: only one friendly match was ever played between the two sides, in 2006 (which the Madrid side won 2–0), and the planned soccer complex between the two has not come to fruition, with Salt Lake opening an academy on its own in Casa Grande, Arizona in 2010.

== 2007 ==
In the first match of the season, RSL controlled throughout, but a fluke goal by Carlos Ruiz in the final minute of stoppage time salvaged a 2–2 draw for FC Dallas on Real's home turf. RSL was devastated by the crushing result. The players appeared lifeless as they were outscored 6–0 in their next three games. Ellinger was fired and replaced by Kreis, who immediately retired as a player.

== 2009 ==
The season progressed in much the same way as 2008. RSL posted a 9-1-5 record in Rio Tinto Stadium, with a record-setting +23 goal differential. However, the team struggled during road matches. In the final few weeks, RSL found itself in a five-way battle for the final two spots in the MLS playoffs – and Salt Lake had the fewest points of the five teams. However, thanks to a 3–0 victory over Colorado in the final game of the regular season – combined with a miraculous series of results in several other matches around the league.

RSL's title run remains the only time in the history of American professional sports in which a team has claimed the league championship despite finishing the regular season with a losing record.

== 2010 ==
On October 16, 2010, Real Salt Lake improved their home unbeaten streak to 25 games in a row after beating the FC Dallas 2–0. This win gave Real Salt Lake the most consecutive home games without a loss in MLS history.

RSL simultaneously tied the record for a Single Season Home Unbeaten Streak with zero losses in Rio Tinto Stadium in the 2010 regular season. This tied the only other standing Single Season Home Unbeaten Streak, held by the San Jose Earthquakes in the 2005 season.

== 2010-11 CONCACAF Champions League ==
The 6th and final game for the first round of Group A came on October 19, when Cruz Azul came to Rio Tinto Stadium. Both teams stood on top of Group A with 10 points each, and the winner would take top of the group. With mostly second-tier players on the field, Real Salt Lake ended up beating Cruz Azul 3–1 in front of a record crowd of 20,463 fans, with two goals coming from rookie Paulo Araujo Jr. Real Salt Lake ended the first round at first place in Group A. This win also made Real Salt Lake the first ever MLS club to win its group in the CONCACAF Champions League.

Thanks in part to their performance in the Champions League, RSL became the first American club ever to crack the Top 25 World Rankings at WorldClubRankings.com (in April 2011).

On April 20, 2011, Real Salt Lake played their first leg of the CONCACAF Champions League Final at Estadio Tecnológico against CF Monterrey. RSL's Javier Morales was able to score an equalizing goal in the 89th minute, ending the game in a 2–2 draw. The second leg of the final was held on April 27, 2011, at Rio Tinto Stadium; Monterrey's Humberto Suazo scored the only goal of the game, giving Monterrey a 3-2 aggregate victory.

== 2011 ==
In their 2011 MLS season, RSL's home unbeaten streak was ended at 29 games on May 28, 2011, with their loss to the Seattle Sounders FC. Real finished the regular season with a (15–11–8) record being third in the Western Conference, once again advancing to the MLS Playoffs. RSL defeated Seattle Sounders (3–2) aggregate in their two-game series, advancing to Face the Los Angeles Galaxy in the Conference Finals. In that game, RSL lost (3–1) to LA, being eliminated from the playoffs. RSL qualified for the 2012-13 CONCACAF Champions League since LA had won both the 2011 MLS Cup and Supporters' Shield, allowing RSL to compete in the tournament having the next best record.

== 2012 ==
In 2012, Real Salt Lake finished second in the Western Conference during the regular season. In the playoffs, RSL faced Seattle once again in the semi-finals in a home-and-home series. Their first match was a 0–0 tie. Seattle defeated Real in the second game (1–0), having RSL eliminated from the playoffs. In the 2012-13 CONCACAF Champions' League, RSL were placed in Group 2 with Herediano and Tauro. Real couldn't advance past the group stage and were eliminated from the tournament.

== 2013–present ==
In 2013, Checketts sold his stake in Real Salt Lake to minority owner Dell Loy Hansen. Before the season, the club also traded key players Jámison Olave, Fabián Espíndola and Will Johnson.

After the season, head coach Jason Kreis left Real Salt Lake to become the first head coach of expansion club New York City FC, with long-time assistant coach Jeff Cassar replacing him at the helm.

Despite a five-game unbeaten start to the 2015 season, the team eventually began to struggle in the standings, coupled with a loss to Sporting Kansas City in the semi-finals of the 2015 Open Cup. RSL also lost key player Nat Borchers, who they traded to the Portland Timbers before the season and all-time goalscorer Álvaro Saborío, traded away to D.C. United mid-season.

The 2016 season started with the Quarterfinals on the 2015–16 CONCACAF Champions League where they were eliminated by eventual runner up Tigres UANL of Liga MX by an aggregate score of 3–1. The 2016 season saw Real Salt Lake return to the playoffs but they were once again eliminated by the LA Galaxy, this time by a 3–1 score line on the road in the Western Conference play in game. In the off season, longtime legends Javier Morales and Jamison Olave did not have their options exercised by the club.

On March 20, 2017, the club announced that head coach Jeff Cassar had been dismissed from his duties only three games into the season. Daryl Shore was named interim head coach for the two games against the New York Red Bulls and Minnesota United FC. On March 29 it was announced that Mike Petke would take over the head coaching position following the game against Minnesota United FC on April 1.

The 2018 season was heralded with the opening of the new $78 million Training Center and Zion's Bank Real Academy in Herriman, Utah. The facility was praised for offering world-class training amenities year round for Real Salt Lake and the organization's other teams the NWSL's Utah Royals FC and the men's second division side Real Monarchs. It also houses the team's youth academy, which was moved from Casa Grande, Arizona, offering a single location and clear path for acquiring and developing young talent.
