= 2010–11 CONCACAF Champions League championship round =

The 2010–11 CONCACAF Champions League championship round was played from February to April 2011. A total of eight teams qualified for the championship round from the group stage.

The championship round draw was conducted on November 1, 2010, at the CONCACAF headquarters in New York City. In the quarterfinals, the group winners were assured of playing the second leg at home, and were drawn against the group runners-up, with the only restriction being that they could not face the same team that it played in the group stage (and thus they may face a team from the same association).

The championship round was played in knockout format. Each tie was played over two legs, and the away goals rule would be used, but not after a tie enters extra time, and so a tie would be decided by penalty shootout if the aggregate score is level after extra time.

== Qualified teams ==
Group	Winners	Runners-up
A	(United States) Real Salt Lake	(Mexico) Cruz Azul
B	(Mexico) Santos Laguna	(United States) Columbus Crew
C	(Mexico) Monterrey	(Costa Rica) Saprissa
D	(Honduras) Olimpia	(Mexico) Toluca

== Bracket ==
Quarterfinals
(Mexico) Toluca	0	0	0
(Mexico) Monterrey	1	1	2
(Mexico) Cruz Azul	2	3	5
(Mexico) Santos Laguna	0	1	1
(United States) Columbus Crew	0	1	1
(United States) Real Salt Lake	0	4	4
(Costa Rica) Saprissa	1	2	3
(Honduras) Olimpia	0	1	1

Semifinals
(Mexico) Monterrey	2	1	3
(Mexico) Cruz Azul	1	1	2
(United States) Real Salt Lake	2	1	3
(Costa Rica) Saprissa	0	2	2

Finals
(Mexico) Monterrey	2	1	3
(United States) Real Salt Lake	2	0	2

== Quarterfinals ==
The first legs of the quarterfinals were played February 22–24, 2011, and the second legs were played March 1–3, 2011.

Team 1	Agg.	Team 2	1st leg	2nd leg
Toluca (Mexico)	0–2	(Mexico) Monterrey	0–1	0–1
Cruz Azul (Mexico)	5–1	(Mexico) Santos Laguna	2–0	3–1
Columbus Crew (United States)	1–4	(United States) Real Salt Lake	0–0	1–4
Saprissa (Costa Rica)	3–1	(Honduras) Olimpia	1–0	2–1

All Times U.S. Eastern Standard Time (UTC−05:00)

=== First leg ===
February 22, 2011
20:00

Columbus Crew (United States)	0 – 0	(United States) Real Salt Lake
	Report

Columbus Crew Stadium, Columbus
Attendance: 4,665
Referee: Jair Marrufo (United States)

February 22, 2011
22:00

Cruz Azul (Mexico)	2 – 0	(Mexico) Santos Laguna
Orozco 58'; Giménez 68'	Report

Estadio Azul, Mexico City
Attendance: 14,062
Referee: Paul Delgadillo (Mexico)

February 23, 2011
20:00

Toluca (Mexico)	0 – 1	(Mexico) Monterrey
	Report	O. Martínez 82'

Estadio Nemesio Díez, Toluca
Attendance: 11,236
Referee: Francisco Chacón (Mexico)

February 24, 2011
20:00

Saprissa (Costa Rica)	1 – 0	(Honduras) Olimpia
Alonso 23'	Report

Estadio Ricardo Saprissa Aymá, San Juan de Tibás
Attendance: 12,344
Referee: Walter López (Guatemala)

=== Second leg ===
March 1, 2011
20:00

Santos Laguna (Mexico)	1 – 3	(Mexico) Cruz Azul
Benítez 71'	Report	Villa 37', 53'; Giménez 50'

Nuevo Estadio Corona, Torreón
Attendance: 25,000
Referee: Roberto Garcia Orozco (Mexico)

Cruz Azul won 5 – 1 on aggregate.

March 1, 2011
22:00

Real Salt Lake (United States)	4 – 1	(United States) Columbus Crew
Saborío 23'; Morales 36', 77'; Williams 90+5'	Report	Mendoza 49'

Rio Tinto Stadium, Sandy
Attendance: 15,405
Referee: Mark Geiger (United States)

Real Salt Lake won 4 – 1 on aggregate.

March 2, 2011
20:00

Monterrey (Mexico)	1 – 0	(Mexico) Toluca
Cardozo 88'	Report

Estadio Tecnológico, Monterrey
Attendance: 22,000
Referee: Marco Antonio Rodríguez Moreno (Mexico)

Monterrey won 2 – 0 on aggregate.

March 3, 2011
20:00

Olimpia (Honduras)	1 – 2	(Costa Rica) Saprissa
Rojas 53'	Report	Alonso 26'; Cordero 63'

Estadio Tiburcio Carías Andino, Tegucigalpa
Attendance: 20,000
Referee: Joel Aguilar (El Salvador)

Saprissa won 3 – 1 on aggregate.

== Semifinals ==
The first legs of the semifinals were played March 15–16, 2011, and the second legs were played April 5–6, 2011.

Team 1	Agg.	Team 2	1st leg	2nd leg
Real Salt Lake (United States)	3–2	(Costa Rica) Saprissa	2–0	1–2
Monterrey (Mexico)	3–2	(Mexico) Cruz Azul	2–1	1–1

All Times U.S. Eastern Daylight Time (UTC−04:00)

=== First leg ===
March 15, 2011
22:00

Real Salt Lake (United States)	2 – 0	(Costa Rica) Saprissa
Saborío 9'; Espíndola 57'	Report

Rio Tinto Stadium, Sandy
Attendance: 16,668
Referee: Enrico Wijngaarde (Suriname)

March 16, 2011
22:00

Monterrey (Mexico)	2 – 1	(Mexico) Cruz Azul
Cardozo 9'; Santana 55'	Report	Cortés 48'

Estadio Tecnológico, Monterrey
Attendance: 22,469
Referee: Paul Delgadillo (Mexico)

=== Second leg ===
April 5, 2011
22:00

Saprissa (Costa Rica)	2 – 1	(United States) Real Salt Lake
L. Cordero 46'; Solís 87' (pen.)	Report	Olave 61'

Estadio Ricardo Saprissa Aymá, San José
Attendance: 21,065
Referee: Marco Antonio Rodríguez Moreno (Mexico)

Real Salt Lake won 3 – 2 on aggregate.

April 6, 2011
20:00

Cruz Azul (Mexico)	1 – 1	(Mexico) Monterrey
Villaluz 23'	Report	Suazo 81' (pen.)

Estadio Azul, Mexico City
Attendance: 24,574
Referee: Francisco Chacón (Mexico)

Monterrey won 3 – 2 on aggregate.

== Finals ==
The first leg of the Final was played April 20, 2011, and the second leg was played April 27, 2011.

Team 1	Agg.	Team 2	1st leg	2nd leg
Monterrey (Mexico)	3–2	(United States) Real Salt Lake	2–2	1–0

All Times U.S. Eastern Daylight Time (UTC−04:00)

=== First leg ===
April 20, 2011
22:00

Monterrey (Mexico)	2 – 2	(United States) Real Salt Lake
de Nigris 18'; Suazo 62' (pen.)	Report	Borchers 35'; Morales 89'

Estadio Tecnológico, Monterrey
Attendance: 30,247
Referee: Joel Aguilar (El Salvador)

=== Second leg ===
April 27, 2011
22:00

Real Salt Lake (United States)	0 – 1	(Mexico) Monterrey
	Report	Suazo 45'

Rio Tinto Stadium, Sandy
Attendance: 20,738
Referee: Roberto Moreno (Panama)

Monterrey won 3 – 2 on aggregate.
