= 2010–11 CONCACAF Champions League =

46th edition of premier club football tournament organized by CONCACAF

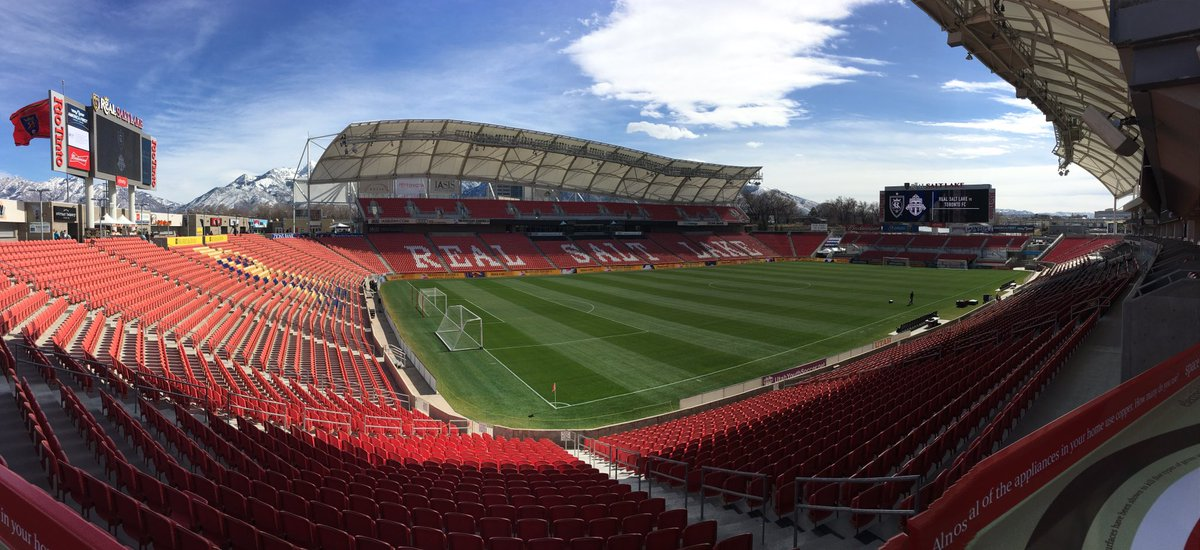
- America First Field in Sandy hosted the second leg Final

Tournament details
- Dates: July 27, 2010–April 27, 2011
- Teams: 24 (from 10 associations)

Final positions
- Champions: (Mexico) Monterrey (1st title)
- Runners-up: (United States) Real Salt Lake

Tournament statistics
- Matches played: 78
- Goals scored: 241 (3.09 per match)
- Attendance: 657,012 (8,423 per match)
- Top scorer(s): (Mexico) Javier Orozco (11 goals)

The 2010–11 CONCACAF Champions League was the 3rd edition of the CONCACAF Champions League under its current format, and overall the 46th edition of the premier football club competition organized by CONCACAF, the regional governing body of North America, Central America and the Caribbean. The tournament began on July 27, 2010 and ended on April 27, 2011. Monterrey of Mexico won their first title, defeating Real Salt Lake of the United States 3-2 on aggregate in the final. As winners, Monterrey qualified for the 2011 FIFA Club World Cup as the CONCACAF representative.

== Qualification ==
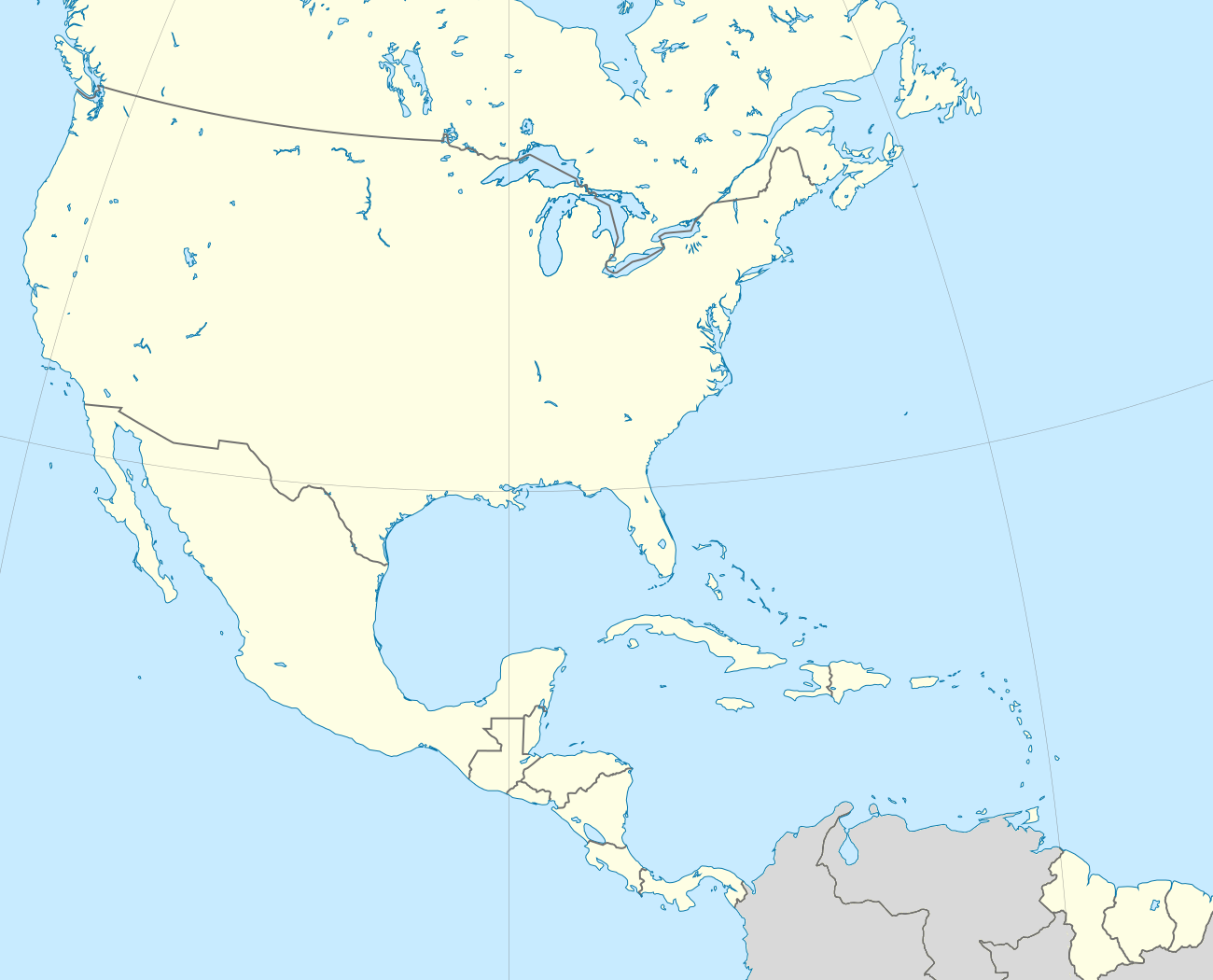
Location of teams of the 2010–11 CONCACAF Champions League
Brown: Group A; Red: Group B; Orange: Group C; Yellow: Group D.

Twenty-four teams participated in the 2010–11 CONCACAF Champions League from the North American, Central American, and Caribbean zones. Nine of the teams came from North America, twelve from Central America, and three from the Caribbean.

Teams may be disqualified and replaced if they do not have a stadium for the tournament that CONCACAF deems suitable. If a club fails to meet the standards for its home stadium, this club must find a suitable stadium in its own country. If said club fails to provide the adequate facilities, it runs the risk of being replaced.

- Central America: 12 Central American clubs can qualify to the Champions League. If one or more clubs is precluded, it is supplanted by a club from another Central American federation. The reallocation would be based on results from the 2009–10 CONCACAF Champions League.
- Caribbean: If any Caribbean club is precluded, it is supplanted by the "2010 CFU Club Championship" 4th-place finisher.

For the Central American representatives that qualify via split seasons, in nations that play a playoff to determine a national champion, the winner gains the nation's top spot, and in nations that do not, total points over both seasons, followed by other tiebreakers, determine which team gains the nation's top spot.

After having analyzed previous results, the CONCACAF Executive Committee approved a reallocation of berths compared to the previous two seasons, giving Panama one automatic place in the group stage while making both of El Salvador's qualifiers go through the preliminary round.

=== Teams ===
Teams in bold qualify directly for the group stage.

Association	Club	Qualifying method
North America (9 teams)
(Mexico) Mexico; 4 berths	**Monterrey**	2009 Apertura champion
(Mexico) Mexico; 4 berths	**Toluca**	2010 Bicentenario champion
(Mexico) Mexico; 4 berths	Cruz Azul	2009 Apertura runner-up
(Mexico) Mexico; 4 berths	Santos Laguna	2010 Bicentenario runner-up
(United States) United States; 4 berths	**Real Salt Lake**	2009 MLS Cup champion
(United States) United States; 4 berths	**Columbus Crew**	2009 MLS Supporters' Shield winner
(United States) United States; 4 berths	Los Angeles Galaxy	2009 MLS Cup runner-up
(United States) United States; 4 berths	Seattle Sounders FC	2009 U.S. Open Cup champion
(Canada) Canada; 1 berth	Toronto FC	2010 Canadian Championship champion
Central America (12 teams)
(Honduras) Honduras; 3 berths	Marathón	2009 Apertura champion
(Honduras) Honduras; 3 berths	**Olimpia**	2010 Clausura champion
(Honduras) Honduras; 3 berths	Motagua	2010 Clausura runner-up^{1}
(Panama) Panama; 3 berths	**Árabe Unido**	2009 Apertura champion and 2010 Clausura champion
(Panama) Panama; 3 berths	Tauro	2009 Apertura runner-up
(Panama) Panama; 3 berths	San Francisco	2010 Clausura runner-up^{1}
(Costa Rica) Costa Rica; 2 berths	Brujas	2009 Invierno champion
(Costa Rica) Costa Rica; 2 berths	**Saprissa**	2010 Verano champion
(Guatemala) Guatemala; 2 berths	**Municipal**	2009 Apertura champion and 2010 Clausura champion
(Guatemala) Guatemala; 2 berths	Xelajú	2010 Clausura runner-up with better aggregate record
(El Salvador) El Salvador; 2 berths	FAS	2009 Apertura champion
(El Salvador) El Salvador; 2 berths	Isidro Metapán	2010 Clausura champion
Caribbean (3 teams)
Puerto Rico	Puerto Rico Islanders	2010 CFU Club Championship champion
Trinidad and Tobago	Joe Public	2010 CFU Club Championship runner-up
Trinidad and Tobago	San Juan Jabloteh	2010 CFU Club Championship third place

^{1} Berths originally awarded to Belize (Belize Defence Force) and Nicaragua (Real Estelí), but both countries failed CONCACAF stadium requirements, so the spots vacated were awarded to Honduras (Motagua) and Panama (San Francisco) based on the performances of clubs from those countries last season.

== Format ==
Like the previous editions, the tournament featured a two-legged Preliminary Round for 16 clubs. The eight winners of the aggregate series qualified along with the eight seeded teams that earned a direct spot to enter the group stage. The clubs involved in Group Stage were placed into four groups of four with each team playing the others in its group in both home and away matches in a round-robin format. The top two teams from each group advanced to the quarterfinals of the Championship Round, which consisted of two-legged, home and away, knockout fixtures. For the two-legged ties, the away goals rule would be used, but not after a tie enters extra time, and so a tie would be decided by penalty shootout if the aggregate score is level after extra time.

Teams from the same association (excluding "wildcard" teams which replace a team from another association) may not be drawn with each other in the preliminary round and Group Stage, but may be drawn with each other in the Championship Round, where the only restriction is that in the quarterfinals, a group winner was drawn with the runner-up of another group and hosted the second leg.

Group Stage
Pot A	(Mexico) Monterrey	(Mexico) Toluca	(United States) Columbus Crew	(United States) Real Salt Lake
Pot B	(Costa Rica) Saprissa	(Honduras) Olimpia	(Guatemala) Municipal	(Panama) Árabe Unido
Preliminary round
Pot A	(Mexico) Cruz Azul	(Mexico) Santos Laguna	(United States) Los Angeles Galaxy	(United States) Seattle Sounders FC
Pot A	(Costa Rica) Brujas	(Honduras) Marathón	(El Salvador) FAS	(Canada) Toronto FC
Pot B	(Guatemala) Xelajú	(Panama) Tauro	(El Salvador) Isidro Metapán	(Honduras) Motagua
Pot B	(Panama) San Francisco	Puerto Rico Islanders	(Trinidad and Tobago) Joe Public	(Trinidad and Tobago) San Juan Jabloteh

== Schedule ==
Round		Draw date	First leg	Second leg
Preliminary round	Preliminary	May 19, 2010 (New York, United States)	July 27–29, 2010	August 3–5, 2010
Group Stage	Matchday 1	May 19, 2010 (New York, United States)	August 17–19, 2010	
Group Stage	Matchday 2	May 19, 2010 (New York, United States)	August 24–26, 2010	
Group Stage	Matchday 3	May 19, 2010 (New York, United States)	September 14–16, 2010	
Group Stage	Matchday 4	May 19, 2010 (New York, United States)	September 21–23, 2010	
Group Stage	Matchday 5	May 19, 2010 (New York, United States)	September 28–30, 2010	
Group Stage	Matchday 6	May 19, 2010 (New York, United States)	October 19–21, 2010	
Championship Round	Quarterfinals	November 1, 2010 (New York, United States)	February 22–24, 2011	March 1–3, 2011
Championship Round	Semifinals	November 1, 2010 (New York, United States)	March 15–16, 2011	April 5–6, 2011
Championship Round	Final	November 1, 2010 (New York, United States)	April 20, 2011	April 27, 2011

== Preliminary round ==
The draw for the preliminary round and the group stage was held on May 19, 2010, at the CONCACAF headquarters in New York City. The first legs of the preliminary round were played July 27–29, 2010, while the second legs were played August 3–5, 2010.

Team 1	Agg.	Team 2	1st leg	2nd leg
FAS (El Salvador)	3–1	(Guatemala) Xelajú	1–1	2–0
Brujas (Costa Rica)	4–6	(Trinidad and Tobago) Joe Public	2–2	2–4
San Juan Jabloteh (Trinidad and Tobago)	0–6	(Mexico) Santos Laguna	0–1	0–5
San Francisco (Panama)	2–9	(Mexico) Cruz Azul	2–3	0–6
Los Angeles Galaxy (United States)	3–5	Puerto Rico Islanders	1–4	2–1
Tauro (Panama)	2–4	(Honduras) Marathón	0–3	2–1
Seattle Sounders FC (United States)	2–1	(El Salvador) Isidro Metapán	1–0	1–1
Toronto FC (Canada)	3–2	(Honduras) Motagua	1–0	2–2

== Group stage ==
The Group Stage was played in 6 rounds during August–October 2010. The rounds are August 17–19, August 24–26, September 14–16, September 21–23, September 28–30, and October 19–21.

=== Group A ===
Team	Pld	W	D	L	GF	GA	GD	Pts	RSL	CRU	TOR	ÁRA
(United States) Real Salt Lake	6	4	1	1	17	11	+6	13		3–1	4–1	2–1
(Mexico) Cruz Azul	6	3	1	2	15	9	+6	10	5–4		0–0	2–0
(Canada) Toronto FC	6	2	2	2	5	7	−2	8	1–1	2–1		1–0
(Panama) Árabe Unido	6	1	0	5	4	14	−10	3	2–3	0–6	1–0	

=== Group B ===
Team	Pld	W	D	L	GF	GA	GD	Pts	SAN	CLB	MUN	JOE
(Mexico) Santos Laguna	6	4	1	1	19	7	+12	13		1–0	6–1	5–1
(United States) Columbus Crew	6	4	0	2	10	4	+6	12	1–0		1–0	3–0
(Guatemala) Municipal	6	2	2	2	9	13	−4	8	2–2	2–1		1–1
(Trinidad and Tobago) Joe Public	6	0	1	5	7	21	−14	1	2–5	1–4	2–3	

=== Group C ===
Team	Pld	W	D	L	GF	GA	GD	Pts	MON	SAP	MAR	SEA
(Mexico) Monterrey	6	5	1	0	11	4	+7	16		1–0	2–0	3–2
(Costa Rica) Saprissa	6	3	1	2	11	7	+4	10	2–2		4–1	2–0
(Honduras) Marathón	6	2	0	4	5	11	−6	6	0–1	2–1		2–1
(United States) Seattle Sounders FC	6	1	0	5	6	11	−5	3	0–2	1–2	2–0	

=== Group D ===
Team	Pld	W	D	L	GF	GA	GD	Pts	OLI	TOL	PRI	FAS
(Honduras) Olimpia	6	4	1	1	12	7	+5	13		2–1	3–0	2–0
(Mexico) Toluca	6	3	1	2	15	5	+10	10	4–0		3–0	5–0
Puerto Rico Islanders	6	2	2	2	8	10	−2	8	1–1	3–2		4–1
(El Salvador) FAS	6	0	2	4	2	15	−13	2	1–4	0–0	0–0	

== Championship round ==
=== Bracket ===
The draw for the Championship Round was made on November 1, 2010. In the quarterfinals, the group winners were assured of playing the second leg at home, and were drawn against the group runners-up, with the only restriction being that they could not face the same team that it played in the group stage (and thus they may face a team from the same association).

Quarterfinals
(Mexico) Toluca	0	0	0
(Mexico) Monterrey	1	1	2
(Mexico) Cruz Azul	2	3	5
(Mexico) Santos Laguna	0	1	1
(United States) Columbus Crew	0	1	1
(United States) Real Salt Lake	0	4	4
(Costa Rica) Saprissa	1	2	3
(Honduras) Olimpia	0	1	1

Semifinals
(Mexico) Monterrey	2	1	3
(Mexico) Cruz Azul	1	1	2
(United States) Real Salt Lake	2	1	3
(Costa Rica) Saprissa	0	2	2

Finals
(Mexico) Monterrey	2	1	3
(United States) Real Salt Lake	2	0	2

=== Quarterfinals ===
The first legs of the quarterfinals were played February 22–24, 2011, and the second legs were played March 1–3, 2011.

Team 1	Agg.	Team 2	1st leg	2nd leg
Toluca (Mexico)	0–2	(Mexico) Monterrey	0–1	0–1
Cruz Azul (Mexico)	5–1	(Mexico) Santos Laguna	2–0	3–1
Columbus Crew (United States)	1–4	(United States) Real Salt Lake	0–0	1–4
Saprissa (Costa Rica)	3–1	(Honduras) Olimpia	1–0	2–1

=== Semifinals ===
The first legs of the semifinals were played March 15–16, 2011, and the second legs were played April 5–6, 2011.

Team 1	Agg.	Team 2	1st leg	2nd leg
Real Salt Lake (United States)	3–2	(Costa Rica) Saprissa	2–0	1–2
Monterrey (Mexico)	3–2	(Mexico) Cruz Azul	2–1	1–1

=== Final ===
The first leg of the Final was played April 20, 2011, and the second leg was played April 27, 2011.

Team 1	Agg.	Team 2	1st leg	2nd leg
Monterrey (Mexico)	3–2	(United States) Real Salt Lake	2–2	1–0

CONCACAF Champions League
2010–11 champion

Monterrey
First title

== Top goalscorers ==
Pos	Name	Club	Goals
1	(Mexico) Javier Orozco	(Mexico) Cruz Azul	11
2	(Costa Rica) Álvaro Saborío	(United States) Real Salt Lake	8
2	(Argentina) Emanuel Villa	(Mexico) Cruz Azul	8
4	(Chile) Héctor Mancilla	(Mexico) Toluca	6
5	(Mexico) José María Cárdenas	(Mexico) Santos Laguna	5
5	(Argentina) Juan Cuevas	(Mexico) Toluca	5
5	(Honduras) Roger Rojas	(Honduras) Olimpia	5
8	(Argentina) Christian Giménez	(Mexico) Cruz Azul	4
8	(Jamaica) Nicholas Addlery	Puerto Rico Islanders	4
8	(Uruguay) Claudio Cardozo	(Honduras) Marathón	4
8	(Mexico) Aldo de Nigris	(Mexico) Monterrey	4
8	(England) David Foley	Puerto Rico Islanders	4
8	(Guatemala) Guillermo Ramírez	(Guatemala) Municipal	4
8	(Chile) Humberto Suazo	(Mexico) Monterrey	4
