= 2010–11 CONCACAF Champions League group stage =

The 2010–11 CONCACAF Champions League group stage was played from August to October 2010. The matchdays were August 17–19, August 24–26, September 14–16, September 21–23, September 28–30, and October 19–21, 2010.

The draw for the preliminary round and the group stage was held on May 19, 2010, at the CONCACAF headquarters in New York City. Teams from the same association (excluding "wildcard" teams which replace a team from another association) may not be drawn with each other.

A total of 16 teams competed, which included 8 automatic qualifiers and 8 winners of the preliminary round. The teams were divided into four groups of four, where each team played each other home-and-away in a round-robin format. If two teams were tied on points, the following tie-breaking criteria shall be applied, in order, to determine the ranking of teams:

1. Greater number of points earned in matches between the teams concerned
2. Greater goal difference in matches between the teams concerned
3. Greater number of goals scored away from home in matches between the teams concerned
4. Reapply first three criteria if two or more teams are still tied
5. Greater goal difference in all group matches
6. Greater number of goals scored in group matches
7. Greater number of goals scored away in all group matches
8. Drawing of lots

The top two teams of each group advanced to the championship round.

== Groups ==
All Times U.S. Eastern (UTC−04:00)

=== Group A ===
| Team | Pld | W | D | L | GF | GA | GD | Pts | RSL | CRU | TOR | ÁRA |
|---|---|---|---|---|---|---|---|---|---|---|---|---|
| (United States) Real Salt Lake | 6 | 4 | 1 | 1 | 17 | 11 | +6 | 13 | | 3–1 | 4–1 | 2–1 |
| (Mexico) Cruz Azul | 6 | 3 | 1 | 2 | 15 | 9 | +6 | 10 | 5–4 | | 0–0 | 2–0 |
| (Canada) Toronto FC | 6 | 2 | 2 | 2 | 5 | 7 | −2 | 8 | 1–1 | 2–1 | | 1–0 |
| (Panama) Árabe Unido | 6 | 1 | 0 | 5 | 4 | 14 | −10 | 3 | 2–3 | 0–6 | 1–0 | |

August 17, 2010
20:00

| Toronto FC (Canada) | 2–1 | (Mexico) Cruz Azul |
|---|---|---|
| Šarić 3'; Mista 44' | Report | Giménez 90' |

BMO Field, Toronto
Attendance: 16,862
Referee: Courtney Campbell (Jamaica)
August 18, 2010
22:00

| Real Salt Lake (United States) | 2–1 | (Panama) Árabe Unido |
|---|---|---|
| Saborío 45', 90+4' (pen.) | Report | Borchers 13' (o.g.) |

Rio Tinto Stadium, Sandy
Attendance: 10,626
Referee: Paul Ward (Canada)

August 24, 2010
22:00

| Árabe Unido (Panama) | 1–0 | (Canada) Toronto FC |
|---|---|---|
| Caesar 40' | Report |

Estadio Agustín Sánchez, La Chorrera
Attendance: 501
Referee: Marlon Mejia (El Salvador)
August 25, 2010
20:00

| Cruz Azul (Mexico) | 5–4 | (United States) Real Salt Lake |
|---|---|---|
| Orozco 5', 76', 87', 89'; Giménez 90+3' | Report | Saborío 23' (pen.), 43'; Espíndola 64'; Johnson 90+2' |

Estadio Azul, Mexico City
Attendance: 3,400
Referee: Oscar Moncada (Honduras)

September 15, 2010
22:00

| Árabe Unido (Panama) | 0–6 | (Mexico) Cruz Azul |
|---|---|---|
| | Report | Orozco 10', 22', 27'; Villa 67', 80'; Biancucchi 86' |

Estadio Rommel Fernández, Panama City
Attendance: 2,975
Referee: Terry Vaughn (United States)
September 15, 2010
22:00

| Real Salt Lake (United States) | 4–1 | (Canada) Toronto FC |
|---|---|---|
| Beckerman 21'; Olave 40'; Saborío 69' (pen.); Araujo 80' | Report | Santos 8' |

Rio Tinto Stadium, Sandy
Attendance: 11,579
Referee: Mauricio Morales (Mexico)

September 21, 2010
22:00

| Cruz Azul (Mexico) | 0–0 | (Canada) Toronto FC |
|---|---|---|
| | Report |

Estadio Azul, Mexico City
Attendance: 5,280
Referee: Juan Carlos Guerra (Guatemala)
September 22, 2010
20:00

| Árabe Unido (Panama) | 2–3 | (United States) Real Salt Lake |
|---|---|---|
| Aguilar 2'; Angulo 51' (pen.) | Report | Johnson 10', 43'; Saborío 36' |

Estadio Rommel Fernández, Panama City
Attendance: 500
Referee: Benito Archundia (Mexico)

September 28, 2010
20:00

| Toronto FC (Canada) | 1–1 | (United States) Real Salt Lake |
|---|---|---|
| Peterson 20' | Report | Morales 67' |

BMO Field, Toronto
Attendance: 10,581
Referee: Trevor Taylor (Barbados)
September 28, 2010
20:00

| Cruz Azul (Mexico) | 2–0 | (Panama) Árabe Unido |
|---|---|---|
| Villa 1'; Cortés 47' (pen.) | Report |

Estadio Azul, Mexico City
Attendance: 5,015
Referee: Wálter Quesada (Costa Rica)

October 19, 2010
20:00

| Toronto FC (Canada) | 1–0 | (Panama) Árabe Unido |
|---|---|---|
| Attakora 30' | Report |

BMO Field, Toronto
Attendance: 10,385
Referee: Roberto Garcia Orozco (Mexico)
October 19, 2010
22:00

| Real Salt Lake (United States) | 3–1 | (Mexico) Cruz Azul |
|---|---|---|
| Paulo Araujo 43', 67'; Warner 69' | Report | Villaluz 71' |

Rio Tinto Stadium, Sandy
Attendance: 20,468
Referee: Joel Aguilar (El Salvador)

=== Group B ===
| Team | Pld | W | D | L | GF | GA | GD | Pts | SAN | CLB | MUN | JOE |
|---|---|---|---|---|---|---|---|---|---|---|---|---|
| (Mexico) Santos Laguna | 6 | 4 | 1 | 1 | 19 | 7 | +12 | 13 | | 1–0 | 6–1 | 5–1 |
| (United States) Columbus Crew | 6 | 4 | 0 | 2 | 10 | 4 | +6 | 12 | 1–0 | | 1–0 | 3–0 |
| (Guatemala) Municipal | 6 | 2 | 2 | 2 | 9 | 13 | −4 | 8 | 2–2 | 2–1 | | 1–1 |
| (Trinidad and Tobago) Joe Public | 6 | 0 | 1 | 5 | 7 | 21 | −14 | 1 | 2–5 | 1–4 | 2–3 | |

August 18, 2010
20:00

| Joe Public (Trinidad and Tobago) | 2–5 | (Mexico) Santos Laguna |
|---|---|---|
| Hislop 11'; Hoshide 44' | Report | Cárdenas 9', 24', 66', 76'; Enríquez 90' |

Marvin Lee Stadium, Tunapuna
Attendance: 900
Referee: Roberto Moreno (Panama)
August 18, 2010
20:00

| Columbus Crew (United States) | 1–0 | (Guatemala) Municipal |
|---|---|---|
| Ekpo 14' | Report |

Columbus Crew Stadium, Columbus
Attendance: 5,745
Referee: Roberto Garcia Orozco (Mexico)

August 24, 2010
22:00

| Santos Laguna (Mexico) | 1–0 | (United States) Columbus Crew |
|---|---|---|
| Estrada 90+3' | Report |

Nuevo Estadio Corona, Torreón
Attendance: 4,700
Referee: Luis Rodriguez (Panama)
August 26, 2010
22:00

| Municipal (Guatemala) | 1–1 | (Trinidad and Tobago) Joe Public |
|---|---|---|
| Rodríguez 77' | Report | Lewis 90+3' |

Estadio Mateo Flores, Guatemala City
Attendance: 2,498
Referee: Baldomero Toledo (United States)

September 14, 2010
20:00

| Columbus Crew (United States) | 3–0 | (Trinidad and Tobago) Joe Public |
|---|---|---|
| Griffit 47'; Garey 51'; Lenhart 79' | Report |

Columbus Crew Stadium, Columbus
Attendance: 5,445
Referee: Walter López (Guatemala)
September 14, 2010
22:00

| Municipal (Guatemala) | 2–2 | (Mexico) Santos Laguna |
|---|---|---|
| Rodríguez 28'; Castillo 87' (pen.) | Report | Ruiz 8' (pen.); Peralta 13' |

Estadio Mateo Flores, Guatemala City
Attendance: 10,414
Referee: Wálter Quesada (Costa Rica)

September 21, 2010
20:00

| Columbus Crew (United States) | 1–0 | (Mexico) Santos Laguna |
|---|---|---|
| Mendoza 87' | Report |

Columbus Crew Stadium, Columbus
Attendance: 6,298
Referee: Courtney Campbell (Jamaica)
September 23, 2010
20:00

| Joe Public (Trinidad and Tobago) | 2–3 | (Guatemala) Municipal |
|---|---|---|
| Toussaint 15', 67' | Report | Ramírez 17', 48'; Guevara 90+2' |

Marvin Lee Stadium, Tunapuna
Attendance: 500
Referee: Joel Aguilar (El Salvador)

September 29, 2010
22:00

| Municipal (Guatemala) | 2–1 | (United States) Columbus Crew |
|---|---|---|
| Ramírez 19', 39' | Report | Iro 44' |

Estadio Mateo Flores, Guatemala City
Attendance: 3,545
Referee: José Pineda (Honduras)
September 29, 2010
22:00

| Santos Laguna (Mexico) | 5–1 | (Trinidad and Tobago) Joe Public |
|---|---|---|
| Reyes 4'; Torres 14'; Quintero 60'; Cárdenas 67'; Figueroa 79' | Report | Baptiste 32' |

Nuevo Estadio Corona, Torreón
Attendance: 7,000
Referee: Mark Geiger (United States)

October 19, 2010
20:00

| Santos Laguna (Mexico) | 6–1 | (Guatemala) Municipal |
|---|---|---|
| Peralta 20', 51'; Ludueña 27', 87'; Ruiz 40'; Quintero 81' | Report | Castillo 39' |

Nuevo Estadio Corona, Torreón
Attendance: 3,600
Referee: Roberto Moreno (Panama)
October 21, 2010
20:00

| Joe Public (Trinidad and Tobago) | 1–4 | (United States) Columbus Crew |
|---|---|---|
| Noel 27' (pen.) | Report | Mendoza 20'; Rentería 50' (pen.), 81'; Oughton 90+2' |

Marvin Lee Stadium, Tunapuna
Attendance: 110
Referee: Stanley Lancaster (Guyana)

=== Group C ===
| Team | Pld | W | D | L | GF | GA | GD | Pts | MON | SAP | MAR | SEA |
|---|---|---|---|---|---|---|---|---|---|---|---|---|
| (Mexico) Monterrey | 6 | 5 | 1 | 0 | 11 | 4 | +7 | 16 | | 1–0 | 2–0 | 3–2 |
| (Costa Rica) Saprissa | 6 | 3 | 1 | 2 | 11 | 7 | +4 | 10 | 2–2 | | 4–1 | 2–0 |
| (Honduras) Marathón | 6 | 2 | 0 | 4 | 5 | 11 | −6 | 6 | 0–1 | 2–1 | | 2–1 |
| (United States) Seattle Sounders FC | 6 | 1 | 0 | 5 | 6 | 11 | −5 | 3 | 0–2 | 1–2 | 2–0 | |

August 17, 2010
22:00

| Monterrey (Mexico) | 1–0 | (Costa Rica) Saprissa |
|---|---|---|
| De Nigris 25' | Report |

Estadio Tecnológico, Monterrey
Attendance: 12,042
Referee: Ricardo Salazar (United States)
August 19, 2010
22:00

| Marathón (Honduras) | 2–1 | (United States) Seattle Sounders FC |
|---|---|---|
| Paz 27'; Cardozo 45+1' (pen.) | Report | Levesque 17' |

Estadio Olímpico Metropolitano, San Pedro Sula
Attendance: 1,990
Referee: Juan Carlos Guerra (Guatemala)

August 25, 2010
22:00

| Seattle Sounders FC (United States) | 0–2 | (Mexico) Monterrey |
|---|---|---|
| | Report | Cardozo 41'; De Nigris 58' |

Qwest Field, Seattle
Attendance: 22,513
Referee: Joel Aguilar (El Salvador)
August 26, 2010
22:00

| Saprissa (Costa Rica) | 4–1 | (Honduras) Marathón |
|---|---|---|
| Sequeira 34'; Arrieta 52'; Martínez 77'; Alonso 86' | Report | Berríos 32' |

Estadio Ricardo Saprissa Aymá, San Juan de Tibás
Attendance: 2,899
Referee: Paul Delgadillo (Mexico)

September 14, 2010
20:00

| Monterrey (Mexico) | 2–0 | (Honduras) Marathón |
|---|---|---|
| De Nigris 23'; Paredes 55' | Report |

Estadio Tecnológico, Monterrey
Attendance: 9,628
Referee: Raymond Bogle (Jamaica)
September 14, 2010
22:00

| Saprissa (Costa Rica) | 2–0 | (United States) Seattle Sounders FC |
|---|---|---|
| Guzmán 56'; Alemán 81' | Report |

Estadio Ricardo Saprissa Aymá, San Juan de Tibás
Attendance: 3,000
Referee: Marco Antonio Rodríguez Moreno (Mexico)

September 22, 2010
20:00

| Monterrey (Mexico) | 3–2 | (United States) Seattle Sounders FC |
|---|---|---|
| De Nigris 74'; Suazo 75'; Pérez 78' (pen.) | Report | Pérez 28' (o.g.); Fucito 44' |

Estadio Tecnológico, Monterrey
Attendance: 19,697
Referee: Marlon Mejia (El Salvador)
September 22, 2010
22:00

| Marathón (Honduras) | 2–1 | (Costa Rica) Saprissa |
|---|---|---|
| Berríos 49'; Sirias 64' (o.g.) | Report | Arrieta 66' |

Estadio Olímpico Metropolitano, San Pedro Sula
Attendance: 1,820
Referee: Roberto Moreno (Panama)

September 28, 2010
22:00

| Saprissa (Costa Rica) | 2–2 | (Mexico) Monterrey |
|---|---|---|
| Meza 16' (o.g.); Mena 65' | Report | Rodríguez 5'; Carreño 31' |

Estadio Ricardo Saprissa Aymá, San Juan de Tibás
Attendance: 1,635
Referee: Terry Vaughn (United States)
September 29, 2010
22:00

| Seattle Sounders FC (United States) | 2–0 | (Honduras) Marathón |
|---|---|---|
| Fucito 21', 68' | Report |

Qwest Field, Seattle
Attendance: 11,768
Referee: Paul Ward (Canada)

October 19, 2010
22:00

| Seattle Sounders FC (United States) | 1–2 | (Costa Rica) Saprissa |
|---|---|---|
| Jaqua 17' | Report | Arrieta 26'; Martínez 89' |

Qwest Field, Seattle
Attendance: 11,434
Referee: Neal Brizan (Trinidad and Tobago)
October 20, 2010
22:00

| Marathón (Honduras) | 0–1 | (Mexico) Monterrey |
|---|---|---|
| | Report | Santana 69' |

Estadio Olímpico Metropolitano, San Pedro Sula
Attendance: 500
Referee: Walter López (Guatemala)

=== Group D ===
| Team | Pld | W | D | L | GF | GA | GD | Pts | OLI | TOL | PRI | FAS |
|---|---|---|---|---|---|---|---|---|---|---|---|---|
| (Honduras) Olimpia | 6 | 4 | 1 | 1 | 12 | 7 | +5 | 13 | | 2–1 | 3–0 | 2–0 |
| (Mexico) Toluca | 6 | 3 | 1 | 2 | 15 | 5 | +10 | 10 | 4–0 | | 3–0 | 5–0 |
| Puerto Rico Islanders | 6 | 2 | 2 | 2 | 8 | 10 | −2 | 8 | 1–1 | 3–2 | | 4–1 |
| (El Salvador) FAS | 6 | 0 | 2 | 4 | 2 | 15 | −13 | 2 | 1–4 | 0–0 | 0–0 | |

August 17, 2010
20:00

| Puerto Rico Islanders | 1–1 | (Honduras) Olimpia |
|---|---|---|
| Addlery 40' | Report | Copete 68' |

Juan Ramón Loubriel Stadium, Bayamón
Attendance: 2,632
Referee: Marco Antonio Rodríguez Moreno (Mexico)
August 18, 2010
22:00

| FAS (El Salvador) | 0–0 | (Mexico) Toluca |
|---|---|---|
| | Report |

Estadio Cuscatlán, San Salvador
Attendance: 3,500
Referee: Wálter Quesada (Costa Rica)

August 25, 2010
20:00

| Puerto Rico Islanders | 4–1 | (El Salvador) FAS |
|---|---|---|
| Foley 16'; Faña 22', 45+1'; Addlery 84' | Report | Reyes 24' |

Juan Ramón Loubriel Stadium, Bayamón
Attendance: 2,050
Referee: Neal Brizan (Trinidad and Tobago)
August 26, 2010
20:00

| Toluca (Mexico) | 4–0 | (Honduras) Olimpia |
|---|---|---|
| Cuevas 4', 10'; Mancilla 63'; Arévalo 86' (o.g.) | Report |

Estadio Nemesio Díez, Toluca
Attendance: 7,463
Referee: Hugo Cruz (Costa Rica)

September 15, 2010
20:00

| Toluca (Mexico) | 3–0 | Puerto Rico Islanders |
|---|---|---|
| González 18'; Cuevas 76' (pen.); Cerda 90+3' | Report |

Estadio Nemesio Díez, Toluca
Attendance: 5,165
Referee: José Pineda (Honduras)
September 16, 2010
20:00

| Olimpia (Honduras) | 2–0 | (El Salvador) FAS |
|---|---|---|
| Rojas 14', 81' | Report |

Estadio Tiburcio Carías Andino, Tegucigalpa
Attendance: 9,200
Referee: Hugo Cruz (Costa Rica)

September 22, 2010
22:00

| FAS (El Salvador) | 0–0 | Puerto Rico Islanders |
|---|---|---|
| | Report |

Estadio Cuscatlán, San Salvador
Attendance: 3,500
Referee: Paul Enrique Delgadillo Haro (Mexico)
September 23, 2010
22:00

| Olimpia (Honduras) | 2–1 | (Mexico) Toluca |
|---|---|---|
| García 14'; Rojas 25' | Report | Cuevas 39' (pen.) |

Estadio Olímpico Metropolitano, San Pedro Sula^{1}
Attendance: 4,654
Referee: Walter López (Guatemala)

September 29, 2010
20:00

| Puerto Rico Islanders | 3–2 | (Mexico) Toluca |
|---|---|---|
| Foley 54'; Horst 70', 90+1' | Report | Mancilla 10', 23' |

Juan Ramón Loubriel Stadium, Bayamón
Attendance: 4,122
Referee: Raymond Bogle (Jamaica)
September 30, 2010
22:00

| FAS (El Salvador) | 1–4 | (Honduras) Olimpia |
|---|---|---|
| López 72' | Report | Roberto Peña 29' (o.g.); Bruschi 45+2'; Barahona 52'; Lozano 89' |

Estadio Cuscatlán, San Salvador
Attendance: 1,000
Referee: Jair Marrufo (United States)

October 20, 2010
20:00

| Toluca (Mexico) | 5–0 | (El Salvador) FAS |
|---|---|---|
| Mancilla 19', 56', 90'; Cuevas 55' (pen.); Calderón 87' | Report |

Estadio Nemesio Díez, Toluca
Attendance: 3,985
Referee: Mark Geiger (United States)
October 20, 2010
22:00

| Olimpia (Honduras) | 3–0 | Puerto Rico Islanders |
|---|---|---|
| Rojas 53', 77'; De Souza 81' | Report |

Estadio Tiburcio Carías Andino, Tegucigalpa
Attendance: 5,550
Referee: Benito Archundia (Mexico)

Notes

- Note 1: Olmpia v Toluca originally was scheduled to be played at Estadio Tiburcio Carías Andino in Tegucigalpa. But officials were forced to move the match to Estadio Olímpico Metropolitano in San Pedro Sula when high winds toppled advertising boards and a cement wall ringing the top of the stadium, sending debris to the street below onto cars and killing a taxi driver.
