= 2010–11 CONCACAF Champions League preliminary round =

The 2010–11 CONCACAF Champions League preliminary round was played from July to August 2010. The first legs were played July 27–29, 2010, and the second legs were played August 3–5, 2010.

The draw for the preliminary round and the group stage was held on May 19, 2010, at the CONCACAF headquarters in New York City. Teams from the same association (excluding "wildcard" teams which replace a team from another association) may not be drawn with each other.

A total of 16 teams competed, divided into eight ties. Each tie was played over two legs, and the away goals rule would be used, but not after a tie enters extra time, and so a tie would be decided by penalty shootout if the aggregate score is level after extra time.

The winners of each tie advanced to the group stage to join the eight automatic qualifiers.

== Matches ==
Team 1	Agg.	Team 2	1st leg	2nd leg
FAS (El Salvador)	3–1	(Guatemala) Xelajú	1–1	2–0
Brujas (Costa Rica)	4–6	(Trinidad and Tobago) Joe Public	2–2	2–4
San Juan Jabloteh (Trinidad and Tobago)	0–6	(Mexico) Santos Laguna	0–1	0–5
San Francisco (Panama)	2–9	(Mexico) Cruz Azul	2–3	0–6
Los Angeles Galaxy (United States)	3–5	Puerto Rico Islanders	1–4	2–1
Tauro (Panama)	2–4	(Honduras) Marathón	0–3	2–1
Seattle Sounders FC (United States)	2–1	(El Salvador) Isidro Metapán	1–0	1–1
Toronto FC (Canada)	3–2	(Honduras) Motagua	1–0	2–2

All Times U.S. Eastern (UTC-4)

=== First leg ===
July 27, 2010
20:00

Toronto FC (Canada)	1–0	(Honduras) Motagua
Barrett 20'	Report

BMO Field, Toronto
Attendance: 18,891
Referee: Terry Vaughn (United States)

July 27, 2010
20:00

San Juan Jabloteh (Trinidad and Tobago)	0–1	(Mexico) Santos Laguna
	Report	Ruiz 83'

Marvin Lee Stadium, Port-of-Spain
Attendance: 763
Referee: Stanley Lancaster (Guyana)

July 27, 2010
22:00

Los Angeles Galaxy (United States)	1–4	Puerto Rico Islanders
Martinez 83' (o.g.)	Report	Foley 26'; Addlery 45', 81'; Hansen 56'

The Home Depot Center, Carson
Attendance: 6,783
Referee: Raymond Bogle (Jamaica)

July 27, 2010
22:00

San Francisco (Panama)	2–3	(Mexico) Cruz Azul
Jiménez 20'; Torres 44'	Report	Villa 3', 54', 71'

Estadio Agustín Sánchez, La Chorrera
Attendance: 725
Referee: Neal Brizan (Trinidad and Tobago)

July 28, 2010
20:00

Tauro (Panama)	0–3	(Honduras) Marathón
	Report	Cardozo 24', 59'; Palacios 35'

Estadio Rommel Fernández, Panama City
Attendance: 1,237
Referee: Marlon Mejia (El Salvador)

July 28, 2010
22:00

Brujas (Costa Rica)	2–2	(Trinidad and Tobago) Joe Public
Núñez 2'; Cordero 66'	Report	Baptiste 13'; Noel 90+1'

Estadio Eladio Rosabal Cordero, Heredia
Attendance: 253
Referee: Juan Carlos Guerra (Guatemala)

July 28, 2010
22:00

Seattle Sounders FC (United States)	1–0	(El Salvador) Isidro Metapán
Montero 60'	Report

Qwest Field, Seattle
Attendance: 17,228
Referee: Ricardo Arellano (Mexico)

July 29, 2010
22:00

FAS (El Salvador)	1–1	(Guatemala) Xelajú
Reyes 44'	Report	Crossa 42'

Estadio Cuscatlán, San Salvador
Attendance: 4,200
Referee: Francisco Chacón (Mexico)

=== Second leg ===
August 3, 2010
20:00

Cruz Azul (Mexico)	6–0	(Panama) San Francisco
Orozco 11', 45', 84'; Biancucchi 18', 90+2'; García 71'	Report

Estadio Azul, Mexico DF
Attendance: 5,000
Referee: Walter Quesada (Costa Rica)

Cruz Azul won 9–2 on aggregate.

August 3, 2010
20:00

Motagua (Honduras)	2–2	(Canada) Toronto FC
Guevara 6', 64'	Report	De Rosario 59'; Barrett 79'

Estadio Tiburcio Carías Andino, Tegucigalpa
Attendance: 8,000
Referee: Luis Rodriguez (Panama)

Toronto FC won 3–2 on aggregate.

August 3, 2010
22:00

Isidro Metapán (El Salvador)	1–1	(United States) Seattle Sounders FC
Canales 17'	Report	Fernández 74'

Estadio Cuscatlán, San Salvador
Attendance: 1,083
Referee: Jose Pineda (Honduras)

Seattle Sounders FC won 2–1 on aggregate.

August 4, 2010
20:00

Puerto Rico Islanders	1–2	(United States) Los Angeles Galaxy
Foley 33' (pen.)	Report	Vélez 37' (o.g.); Franklin 84'

Estadio Juan Ramón Loubriel, Bayamón
Attendance: 12,993
Referee: Trevor Taylor (Barbados)

Puerto Rico Islanders won 5–3 on aggregate.

August 4, 2010
22:00

Santos Laguna (Mexico)	5–0	(Trinidad and Tobago) San Juan Jabloteh
Reyes 3', 80'; Salinas 46'; Quintero 73'; González 83'	Report

Estadio Corona, Torreón
Attendance: 10,000
Referee: Paul Ward (Canada)

Santos Laguna won 6–0 on aggregate.

August 4, 2010
22:00

Marathón (Honduras)	1–2	(Panama) Tauro
Cardozo 24'	Report	Rentería 26', 45'

Estadio Olímpico Metropolitano, San Pedro Sula
Attendance: 2,528
Referee: Mark Geiger (United States)

Marathón won 4–2 on aggregate.

August 5, 2010
20:00

Joe Public (Trinidad and Tobago)	4–2	(Costa Rica) Brujas
Baptiste 8'; Mitchell 39'; Lewis 45'; Toussaint 76'	Report	Arias 63'; Núñez 72'

Marvin Lee Stadium, Tunapuna
Attendance: 500
Referee: Valdin Ledgister (Jamaica)

Joe Public won 6-4 on aggregate.

August 5, 2010
22:00

Xelajú (Guatemala)	0–2	(El Salvador) FAS
	Report	Bentos 41', 77'

Estadio Nacional Mateo Flores, Guatemala City
Attendance: 8,000
Referee: Hugo Cruz (Costa Rica)

FAS won 3-1 on aggregate.
