= Martín Crossa =

Argentine-Uruguayan footballer (born 1977)

Personal information
- Full name: Nelson Martín Crossa Silveira
- Date of birth: February 2, 1977 (age 49)
- Place of birth: Buenos Aires, Argentina
- Height: 1.85 m (6 ft 1 in)
- Position: Midfielder

Senior career*
Years	Team	Apps	(Gls)
1998–2003	Miramar Misiones	116	(44)
1999	→ Bella Vista (loan)		
2003	→ IFK Göteborg (loan)	10	(0)
2004	Defensor Sporting	9	(0)
2004	Everton	16	(8)
2005	Lierse	4	(0)
2005–2006	Miramar Misiones	10	(4)
2006	Guaraní	2	(0)
2007	Progreso	15	(1)
2007–2008	Belgrano	6	(0)
2008–2009	Central Español	24	(9)
2009–2010	Municipal	35	(19)
2010–2011	Xelajú MC	28	(11)
2011–2012	Racing Montevideo	20	(7)
2012–2013	Miramar Misiones	21	(8)
Total		316+	(111)
- * Club domestic league appearances and goals

Nelson Martín Crossa Silveira (born February 2, 1977, in Buenos Aires, Argentina) is an Argentine-Uruguayan former footballer.

== Teams ==
- (Uruguay) Miramar Misiones 1997–1999
- (Uruguay) Bella Vista 1999
- (Uruguay) Miramar Misiones 2000–2002
- (Sweden) IFK Göteborg 2003
- (Uruguay) Miramar Misiones 2003
- (Uruguay) Defensor Sporting 2004
- (Chile) Everton 2004
- (Belgium) Lierse 2005
- (Uruguay) Miramar Misiones 2005–2006
- (Paraguay) Guaraní 2006
- (Uruguay) Progreso 2007
- (Argentina) Belgrano 2007–2008
- (Uruguay) Central Español 2008–2009
- (Guatemala) Municipal 2009–2010
- (Guatemala) Xelajú MC 2010–2011
- (Uruguay) Racing de Montevideo 2011–2012
- (Uruguay) Miramar Misiones 2012–2013

== Personal life ==
Born in Argentina, Crossa holds the Uruguayan nationality.

Before becoming a professional footballer, Crossa graduated as a computer repair and maintenance technician.

== Titles ==
- (Guatemala) Club Social y Deportivo Municipal 2009
