= Luis Diego Cordero =

Costa Rican footballer (born 1988)

Personal information
- Full name: Luis Diego Cordero Jiménez
- Date of birth: May 21, 1988 (age 38)
- Place of birth: Alajuela, Costa Rica
- Height: 1.73 m (5 ft 8 in)
- Position: Midfielder

Team information
- Current team: Herediano
- Number: 27

Youth career
- 2002–2007: Deportivo Saprissa

Senior career*
Years	Team	Apps	(Gls)
2007–2014	Deportivo Saprissa	82	(4)
2014–	Herediano	12	(0)

International career
2005	Costa Rica U-17		
2012	Costa Rica	1	(0)
- * Club domestic league appearances and goals

Luis Diego Cordero Jiménez (born May 21, 1988) is a Costa Rican football midfielder currently playing for Primera División club C.S. Herediano.

== Club career ==
Cordero started his career at Deportivo Saprissa and joined Herediano in January 2014.

== International career ==
Cordero played at the 2005 FIFA U-17 World Championship held in Peru. He made his senior debut for Costa Rica in a March 2012 friendly match against Jamaica.
