= Joel Aguilar =

Salvadoran football referee (born 1975)

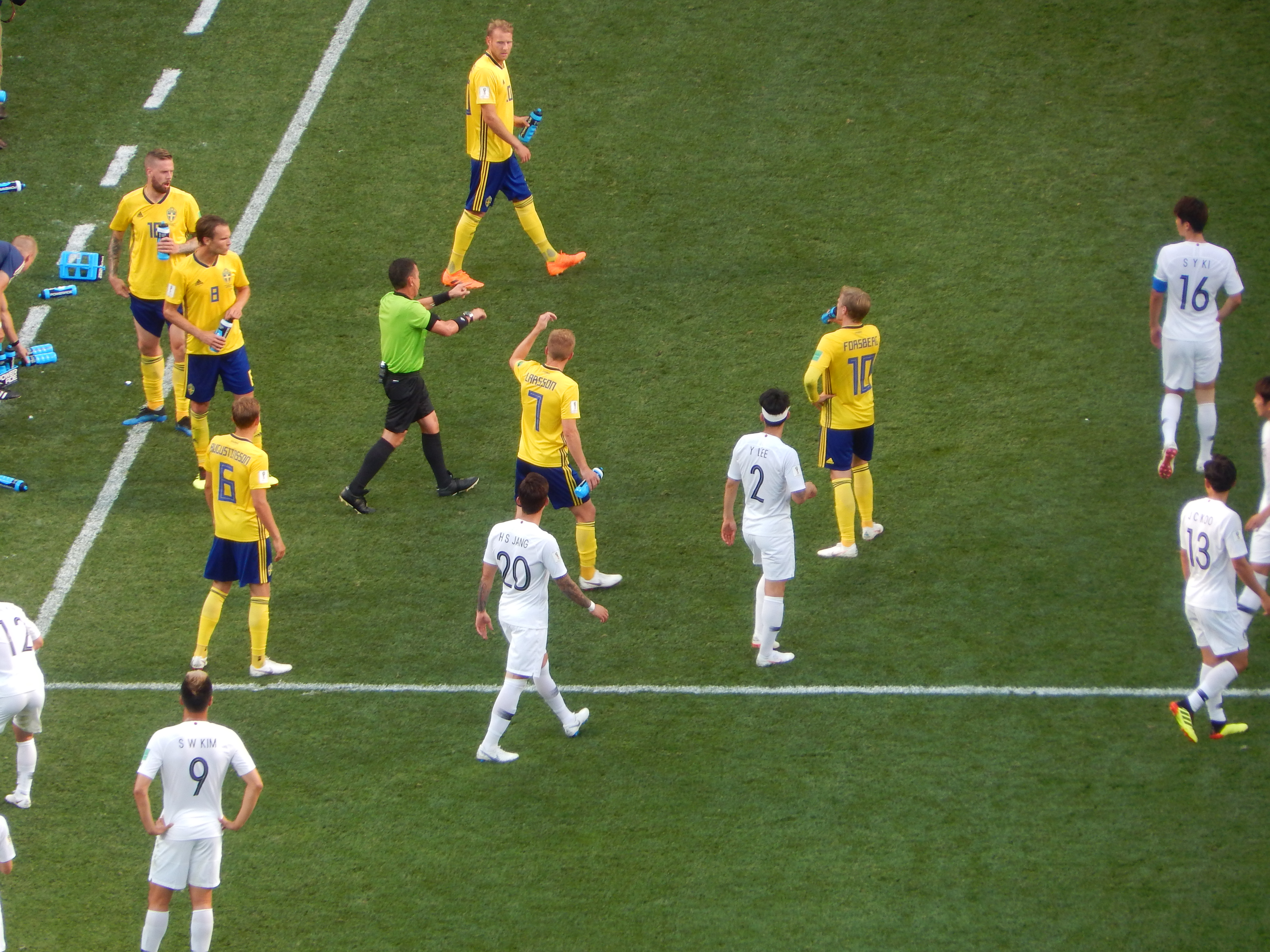
- FWC 2018 - Group F - KOR v SWE - VAR Penalty Kick
- Full name: Joel Antonio Aguilar Chicas
- Born: 2 July 1975 (age 51); El Salvador

International
Years	League	Role
2002–2019	FIFA listed	Referee

Joel Antonio Aguilar Chicas (born July 2, 1975) is a Salvadoran retired football referee. He has been a FIFA listed international referee since 2002.

Aguilar was selected as a referee for the 2007 FIFA Under-20 World Cup in Canada, where he refereed the matches between the United States and South Korea on June 30, 2007, New Zealand and Gambia on July 5, 2007, and Austria and Chile on July 8, 2007. Aguilar was selected as a reserve official for the 2010 FIFA World Cup. Therefore, he did not officiate in any matches during the tournament except as a 4th official.

Aguilar was selected as a referee for the first leg of the 2011 CONCACAF Champions League Final, contested by Rayados de Monterrey and Real Salt Lake in Monterrey, Mexico. Also in 2011, he was selected for the 2011 CONCACAF Gold Cup including the Final at the Rose Bowl Stadium in Pasadena, California. On January 14, 2014, the FIFA Referees Committee appointed Aguilar as one of the referees to officiate at the 2014 World Cup in Brazil. He was once again selected to referee matches at the 2015 CONCACAF Gold Cup, and for the third Gold Cup in a row, he was selected to referee the final match. On January 22, 2016, he was named CONCACAF 2015 Male Referee of the Year.

Aguilar was named as one of the match referees for the 2018 FIFA World Cup.

Aguilar has officiated in various international tournaments at both the club and international level, such as:

- 11 Salvadoran League finals
- International Friendlies
- 2007 CONCACAF Gold Cup
- 2007 FIFA U-20 World Cup
- 2007 FIFA U-17 World Cup
- 2007 North American SuperLiga
- 2009 CONCACAF Gold Cup
- 2010 FIFA World Cup qualification (CONCACAF)
- 2010 FIFA World Cup
- 2011 CONCACAF Gold Cup (including the Final)
- 2011 CONCACAF Champions League Final
- 2011 FIFA Club World Cup
- 2013 FIFA Confederations Cup
- 2013 CONCACAF Gold Cup (including the Final)
- 2014 FIFA World Cup qualification (CONCACAF)
- 2014 FIFA World Cup
- 2015 CONCACAF Gold Cup (including the Final)
- 2015 CONCACAF Cup
- 2016 Copa América Centenario
- 2017 CONCACAF Gold Cup
- 2018 FIFA World Cup qualification (CONCACAF)
- 2018 FIFA World Cup
- 2019 Campeones Cup

== See also ==
- List of football referees
- List of FIFA international referees
