= Fabián Espíndola =

Argentine footballer

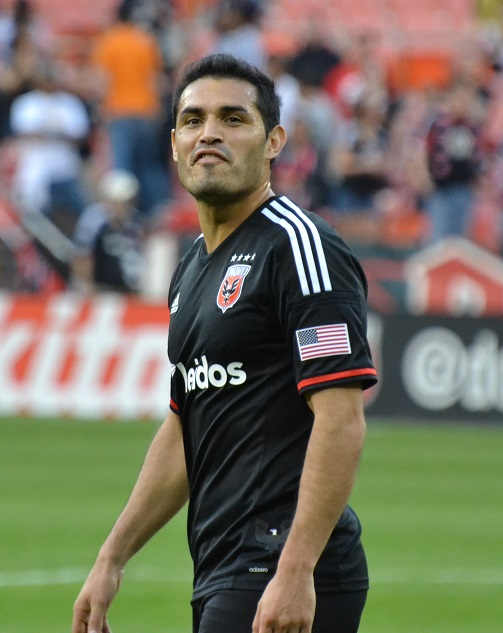
- Fabián Espíndola Playing for D.C. United

Personal information
- Full name: Edgar Fabián Espíndola
- Date of birth: 4 May 1985 (age 41)
- Place of birth: Merlo, Argentina
- Height: 5 ft 9 in (1.75 m)
- Position: Forward

Youth career
- Boca Juniors

Senior career*
Years	Team	Apps	(Gls)
2005	Boca Juniors	6	(1)
2006	Talleres	13	(1)
2006	Aucas	3	(0)
2007	Deportivo Quito	5	(0)
2007–2008	Real Salt Lake	24	(7)
2009	Deportivo Anzoátegui	5	(3)
2009–2012	Real Salt Lake	101	(28)
2013	New York Red Bulls	28	(9)
2013–2016	D.C. United	59	(20)
2016–2017	Necaxa	32	(5)
2017–2018	Albacete	12	(0)
2018	San Martín de Tucumán	6	(0)
- * Club domestic league appearances and goals as of 6 August 2019

Edgar Fabián Espíndola (born 4 May 1985) is an Argentine footballer who plays as a forward.

== Club career ==
=== Early career ===
Espíndola started his career in 2005 with Argentine giants Boca Juniors. He played six games for the club, but Boca failed to win any of them. However, he was a member of the Boca Juniors squad that captured the 2005 Copa Sudamericana. In 2006, he was offloaded to Talleres. He then had spells with Ecuadorian teams Aucas and Deportivo Quito before joining Real Salt Lake.

=== Major League Soccer ===
He was acquired by Real Salt Lake at the same time as fellow Argentines Matias Mantilla and Javier Morales. He scored his first goal against Kansas City Wizards, and celebrated this goal by doing his customary backflip. Six minutes into a game against Los Angeles Galaxy on 6 September 2008, Espíndola scored a goal that was later ruled offside. However, before he had seen the final decision on the goal he had commenced his celebratory backflip, which resulted in him injuring his ankle, ruling him out for around eight weeks. Real Salt Lake decided not to purchase Espíndola's contract and he was released in January 2009. He then signed to play for Venezuelan team Deportivo Anzoátegui, scoring 3 goals in 5 matches for the club. On 29 January 2009 Espíndola scored Deportivo Anzoátegui's first ever goal in the Copa Libertadores helping the club to a 2–0 victory over Deportivo Cuenca.

Espíndola returned to Salt Lake in April 2009 and helped them win the MLS Cup in November 2009. In 2011 Espíndola had his most productive season for Salt Lake as he scored a career high 10 goals in 27 matches. In February 2012, Espíndola signed a four-year contract extension with Real Salt Lake. During the 2012 season Espíndola continued his fine form as he scored 9 goals and provided 7 assists in 30 matches.

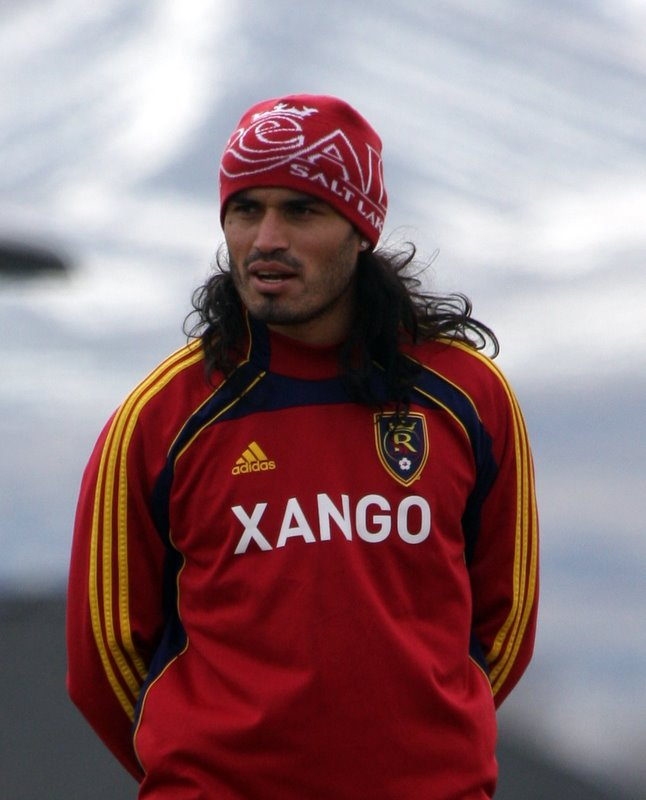
Espíndola training with Real Salt Lake in 2011

On 3 December 2012, Espíndola was traded with Jamison Olave to New York Red Bulls in exchange for allocation money. On 3 March 2013 Espíndola made his debut for New York scoring twice in a 3–3 draw at Portland Timbers. On 27 July 2013 Espíndola converted on a pair of penalty kicks to help New York to a 4–3 victory over his former club Real Salt Lake.

On 18 December 2013, Espíndola joined D.C. United in the second stage of the 2013 MLS Re-Entry Draft He was known to be a usual starter for DC. On 20 July 2016, D.C. United traded Espíndola to Vancouver Whitecaps FC for allocation money. He finished at D.C. United with 59 games played, 20 goals scored, and 17 goals assisted.

=== Necaxa ===
Espíndola was sold by the Whitecaps (without having played a game for them) to recently promoted Liga MX side Necaxa on 26 July 2016.

=== Albacete ===
On 8 August 2017, Espíndola signed a one-year contract with Spanish Segunda División club Albacete Balompié.

== Personal life ==
A report in The Washington Post on D.C. United roster statuses in November 2014 did not include Espíndola as a player using an international roster slot. It is believed that he received a U.S. green card during the 2014 season.

On 27 March 2017, former D.C. United goalkeeper Charlie Horton sued Espíndola, coach Ben Olsen, and Major League Soccer. Espíndola allegedly assaulted Horton during practice and Horton received a concussion. The filing states that, "due to the severity of his ongoing post-concussive neurological symptoms, which directly inhibited his ability to perform at a level necessary to continue his professional career, Mr. Horton was forced to officially retire from professional soccer." Olsen is being sued for failing to adequately supervise Espíndola. MLS is liable, the suit says, because, in its centralized business structure, the league owns all teams and player contracts. Horton dismissed the lawsuit in late 2019.

== Career statistics ==
Club	Season	League			Cup		Playoffs		Continental		Total	
Club	Season	Division	Apps	Goals	Apps	Goals	Apps	Goals	Apps	Goals	Apps	Goals
Boca Juniors	2005	Primera División	6	1	-	-	-	-	—		6	1
Talleres	2006	Primera B Nacional	13	1	-	-	-	-	—		13	1
Aucas	2006	Ecuadorian Serie A	3	0	-	-	-	-	—		3	0
Deportivo Quito	2007	Ecuadorian Serie A	5	0	-	-	-	-	—		5	0
Real Salt Lake	2007	MLS	12	2	-	-	-	-	—		12	2
Real Salt Lake	2008	MLS	12	5	1	0	2	0	-	-	14	5
Deportivo Anzoátegui	2009	Primera División	3	2	-	-	-	-	2	1	5	3
Real Salt Lake	2009	MLS	22	3	-	-	4	0	—		26	3
Real Salt Lake	2010	MLS	22	6	2	0	2	1	3	1	29	8
Real Salt Lake	2011	MLS	27	10	1	0	3	0	6	1	37	11
Real Salt Lake	2012	MLS	30	9	-	-	2	0	4	0	36	9
New York Red Bulls	2013	MLS	28	9	2	2	1	0	—		31	11
D.C. United	2014	MLS	27	11	-	-	2	0	1	2	30	13
D.C. United	2015	MLS	17	5	-	-	3	0	2	2	22	7
D.C. United	2016	MLS	15	4	-	-	-	-	2	0	17	4
Necaxa	2016-17	Liga MX	25	4	3	1	4	0	—		32	5
Career total			267	72	9	3	23	1	20	7	319	83

== Honours ==
Boca Juniors

- Copa Sudamericana: 2005

Real Salt Lake

- MLS Cup: 2009

New York Red Bulls

- MLS Supporters' Shield: 2013
