= Jámison Olave =

Colombian footballer and manager (born 1981)

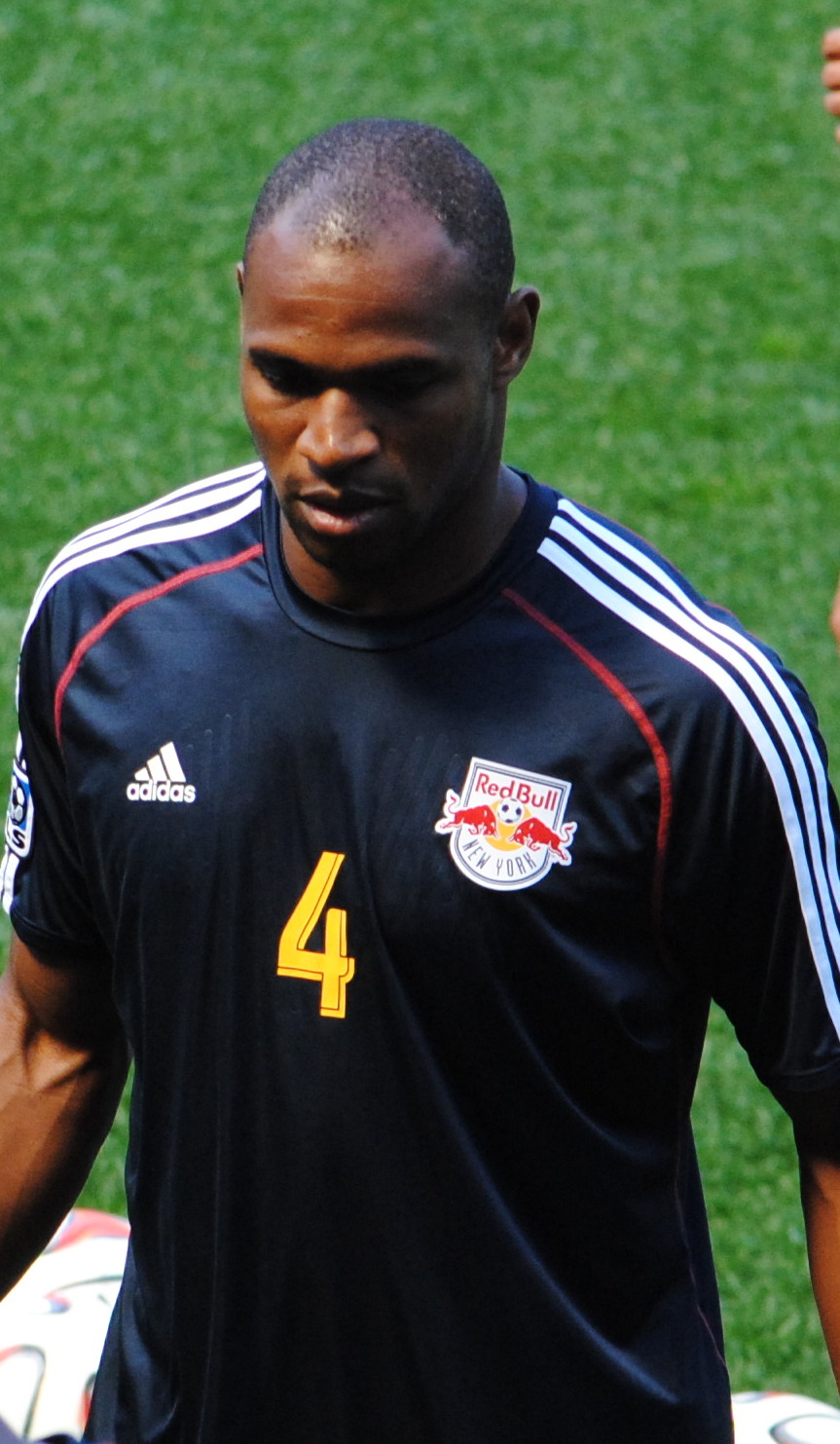
- Olave training for New York Red Bulls in 2014

Personal information
- Full name: Jámison Olave Mosquera
- Date of birth: April 21, 1981 (age 45)
- Place of birth: Medellín, Colombia
- Height: 6 ft 3 in (1.91 m)
- Position: Defender

Team information
- Current team: Real Salt Lake (assistant)

Senior career*
Years	Team	Apps	(Gls)
2001–2008	Deportivo Cali	97	(2)
2002	→ Atlético Huila (loan)	12	(0)
2003	→ Patriotas (loan)	18	(2)
2004	→ Boyacá Chicó (loan)	34	(1)
2008	→ Real Salt Lake (loan)	23	(2)
2009–2012	Real Salt Lake	97	(8)
2013–2014	New York Red Bulls	57	(4)
2015–2016	Real Salt Lake	23	(2)
Total		361	(21)

Managerial career
- 2017–2019: Real Monarchs (assistant)
- 2018–2019: Real Monarchs (interim)
- 2019–2023: Real Monarchs
- 2024–: Real Salt Lake (assistant)
- * Club domestic league appearances and goals as of November 14, 2016

Jámison Olave Mosquera (born April 21, 1981) is a Colombian former professional footballer who is currently an assistant coach for Major League Soccer side Real Salt Lake.

== Career ==
Olave began his career with Deportivo Cali in 2001. He played on loan for a multitude of clubs in his native Colombia, before returning to his first club, Deportivo Cali in 2005. In his first season back with Cali, Olave helped the club capture the 2005 Finalización. While with Cali Olave appeared in 97 league matches and scored two goals.

In January 2008, Olave accepted an offer to join Real Salt Lake on a one-year loan deal with an option for the club to buy at the end of the season. On October 9, 2008, Olave scored RSL's first goal in their inaugural game at Rio Tinto Stadium, which helped his team draw 1–1 against New York Red Bulls, keeping the team's playoff hopes alive. On November 24, 2008, Olave agreed to a permanent contract with Real Salt Lake that would keep him through the 2012 season. Olave is widely regarded one of the best center backs in Major League Soccer, he was selected for the starting XI at the 2010 & 2011 MLS All-Star Games. At 6-foot-3 and 220 pounds, his intimidating stature and strong play helped him secure Major League Soccer's Defender of the Year award in 2010. He is known for his "combination of size, speed and strength". In five years with Real Salt Lake Olave appeared in 120 league matches and scored 10 goals and helped RSL capture the 2009 MLS Cup.

On December 3, 2012, Olave was traded with Fabián Espíndola to New York Red Bulls in exchange for allocation money. On March 3, 2013, Olave made his debut for New York scoring a goal for his new club in a 3–3 draw at Portland Timbers. In a match against Chicago Fire, he scored the opening goal in a 3–1 away loss. Olave played his first derby match against Red Bull rivals D.C. United, where he scored another goal in a 2–0 victory. Olave ended his first season with New York appearing in 29 league matches and scoring 4 goals, helping the club to its first major title the MLS Supporters' Shield.

On December 10, 2014, Olave was traded back to his former club Real Salt Lake in exchange for allocation money. He announced that he would once again leave the club on November 14, 2016.

== Personal ==
Olave earned his U.S. green card in summer 2010. This status also qualified him as a domestic player for MLS roster purposes.

== Coaching ==
On January 6, 2017, Olave was hired as a defensive coach for Real Monarchs under then head coach Mike Petke. He then served as an assistant coach for the Monarchs under Mark Briggs when Petke was named the head coach of Real Salt Lake. Olave served as interim head coach for the Monarchs before being named the permanent head coach on November 20, 2019.

On January 16, 2024, it was announced that Olave had moved to the senior Real Salt Lake coaching staff, as an assistant under head coach Pablo Mastroeni.

== Managerial statistics ==
As of match played 7 March 2020

Managerial record by team and tenure
Team	Nat	From	To	Record								Ref
Team	Nat	From	To	G	W	D	L	GF	GA	GD	Win %	Ref
Real Monarchs (interim)	(United States)	23 August 2018	21 January 2019	11	3	1	7	13	21	−8	27.27	
Real Monarchs	(United States)	1 July 2019	Present	24	14	5	5	53	30	+23	58.33	
Total				35	17	6	12	66	51	+15	48.57	—

== Honors ==
Individual

- MLS Defender of the Year Award: 2010
- MLS Best XI: 2010, 2011
