= Nat Borchers =

American soccer player (born 1981)

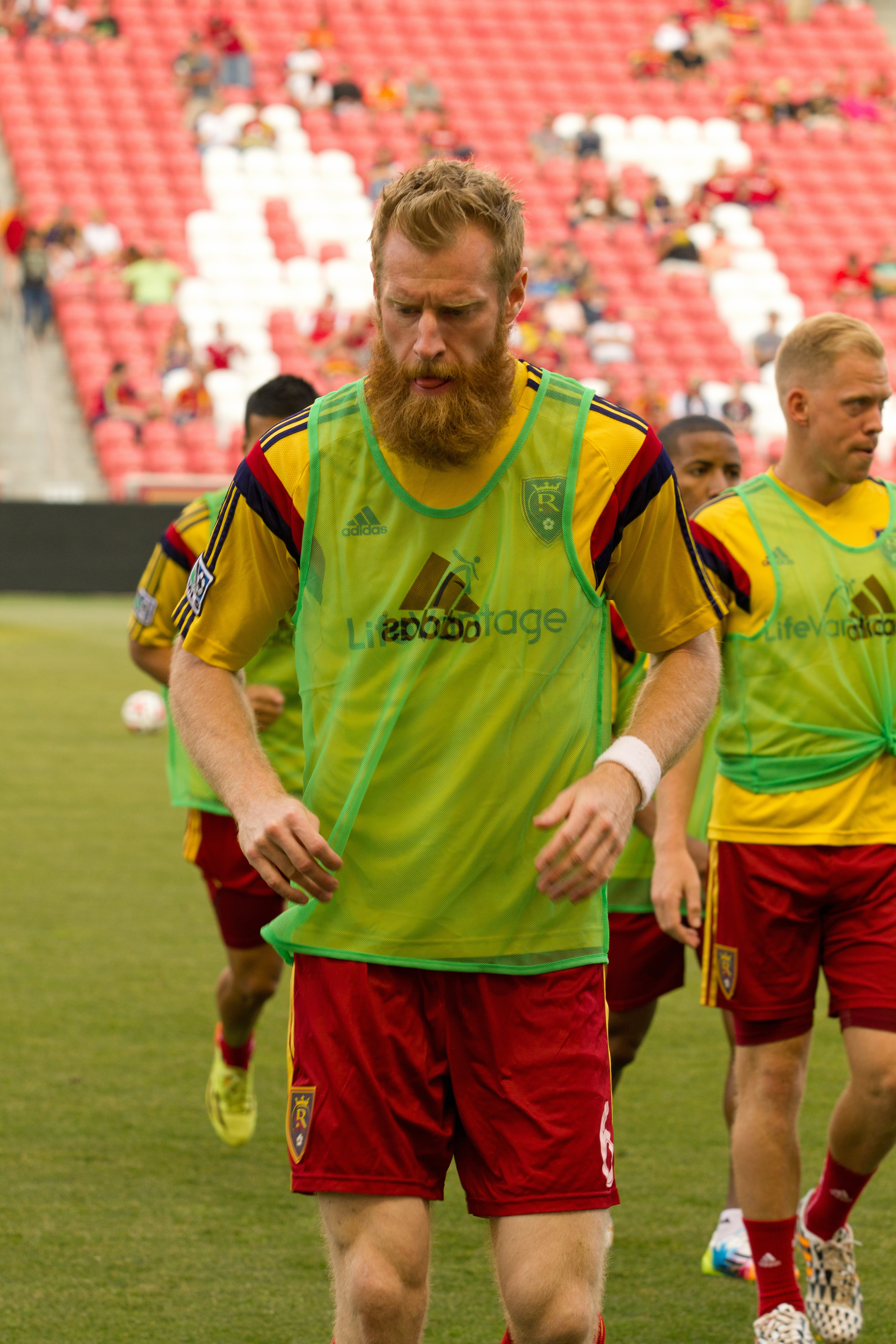
- Borchers wearing a Real Salt Lake kit

Personal information
- Date of birth: April 13, 1981 (age 45)
- Place of birth: Tucson, Arizona, United States
- Height: 6 ft 2 in (1.88 m)
- Position: Defender

College career
Years	Team	Apps	(Gls)
1999–2002	Denver Pioneers		

Senior career*
Years	Team	Apps	(Gls)
2002	Boulder Rapids Reserve		
2003–2005	Colorado Rapids	83	(2)
2006–2007	Odd	46	(1)
2008–2014	Real Salt Lake	205	(10)
2015–2016	Portland Timbers	52	(4)
Total		386	(17)

International career
2003–2004	United States U23	6	(0)
2005–2010	United States	3	(0)
- * Club domestic league appearances and goals

Nat Borchers (born April 13, 1981) is an American former professional soccer player who played as a defender. He won the MLS Cup in 2009 with Real Salt Lake and in 2015 with the Portland Timbers.

== Youth and college career ==
Born in Tucson, Arizona, Borchers attended East High School in Pueblo, Colorado where he played on the boys' soccer team. In his four years at East High School, he was selected all-league three times and All-State once. He was chosen as the League MVP his senior year. He also played for the youth club, Colorado Storm (Club Colorado Select). In addition to playing soccer, Borchers ran track and played basketball. Two of his sporting idols were Magic Johnson and Dennis Bergkamp.

Borchers played four years of college soccer for the University of Denver from 1999 to 2002, and also excelled for the Colorado Rapids' PDL affiliate, the Boulder Rapids Reserve. He was selected all-league three times and was the MVP of the league in his senior year at DU. Despite this, Borchers went undrafted in the 2003 MLS SuperDraft. Borchers earned his bachelor's and master's degrees in accounting while in school.

== Club career ==
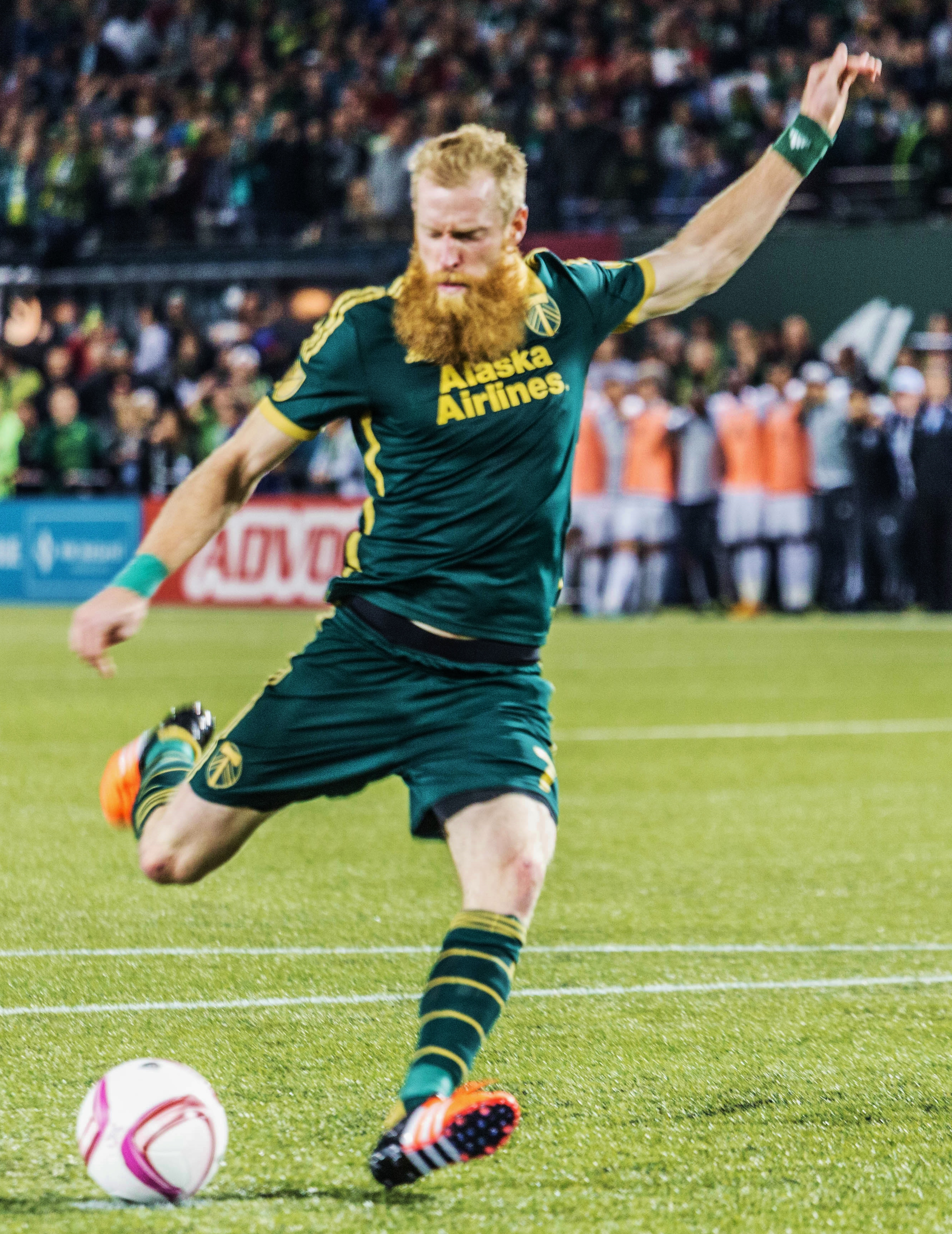
Borchers with the Timbers in 2015

Borchers was signed to the Colorado Rapids developmental roster on March 18, 2003. However, he soon proved to be far better than most had expected and by the middle of the 2003 season had secured a starting spot in Colorado's first team central defense. Throughout the 2005 season, Borchers continued to anchor the Rapids defense.

In 2006, Borchers was transferred to Norwegian club Odd Grenland. In February 2008, Borchers signed with MLS side Real Salt Lake on a transfer, after being released by Odd Grenland. His success with RSL in his first three seasons with the club led to a long-term deal announced on February 14, 2011, that kept Borchers in Salt Lake through the 2014 season.

On December 8, 2014, Borchers was traded to Portland Timbers in exchange for allocation funds. During his time with the Timbers, Borchers had been a starting defender contributing in the club's 2015 Championship run. The defender in 2016 had suffered with a leg injury that had him out for the rest of the season. On February 2, 2017, he retired from professional soccer.

== International career ==
Borchers' surprising 2003 season led to him being called up for the Under-23 team's Olympic Qualifiers, in which the team was eliminated. He earned his first cap for the senior national team on March 9, 2005, against Colombia. Borchers last played for the senior team on November 17, 2010, against South Africa, entering in the 67th minute.

== Outside football ==
In addition to soccer, Borchers owns and manages his own commercial real estate investment company, Back Line Real Estate.

== Career statistics ==
=== Club ===
As of March 23, 2014

Appearances and goals by club, season and competition
Club	Season	League			Cup (Note: Includes Open Cup, Norwegian Football Cup.)		League post season (Note: Includes MLS Playoffs.)		Continental		Total	
Club	Season	Division	Apps	Goals	Apps	Goals	Apps	Goals	Apps	Goals	Apps	Goals
Colorado Rapids	2003	Major League Soccer	22	0	2	0	2	1	–		26	1
Colorado Rapids	2004	Major League Soccer	29	2	1	0	2	0	–		32	2
Colorado Rapids	2005	Major League Soccer	31	0	0	0	0	0	–		31	0
Colorado Rapids	Total		82	2	3	0	4	1	0	0	89	3
Odd Grenland	2006	Tippeligaen	23	0	3	2	2	1	–		28	3
Odd Grenland	2007	Tippeligaen	19	1	5	1	0	0	–		24	2
Odd Grenland	Total		42	1	8	3	2	1	0	0	52	5
Real Salt Lake	2008	Major League Soccer	29	0	–		3	0	–		32	0
Real Salt Lake	2009	Major League Soccer	30	1	–		4	0	–		34	1
Real Salt Lake	2010	Major League Soccer	30	2	–		2	0	5 (Note: Appearances in CONCACAF Champions League)	0	37	2
Real Salt Lake	2011	Major League Soccer	30	3	2	0	1	0	3	0	36	3
Real Salt Lake	2012	Major League Soccer	26	2	1	0	2	0	3	0	32	2
Real Salt Lake	2013	Major League Soccer	28	1	4	0	5	0	–		34	1
Real Salt Lake	2014	Major League Soccer	32	1	0	0	2	0	–		34	1
Real Salt Lake	Total		205	10	7	0	19	0	11	0	242	10
Portland Timbers	2015	Major League Soccer	31	3	2	0	6	1	–		39	4
Portland Timbers	2016	Major League Soccer	21	1	1	0	–		0	0	22	1
Portland Timbers	Total		52	4	3	0	6	1	0	0	61	5
Career total			381	17	21	3	31	3	11	0	444	23

=== International ===
As of September 16, 2013

Appearances and goals by national team and year
National team	Year	Apps	Goals
United States	2005	2	0
United States	2010	1	0
Total		3	0

== Honors ==
Real Salt Lake

- MLS Cup: 2009
- Eastern Conference (playoffs): 2009
- Western Conference (playoffs): 2013

Portland Timbers

- MLS Cup: 2015
- Western Conference (playoffs): 2015

Individual

- MLS Best XI: 2010
