= 2004 MLS expansion draft =

Player draft for MLS teams

2004 MLS Expansion Draft

General information
- Date: November 19, 2004

Overview
- Expansion teams: Chivas USA; Real Salt Lake
- Expansion season: 2005

The 2004 MLS Expansion Draft was held on November 19, 2004, and consisted of 10 rounds. The two new teams, Chivas USA and Real Salt Lake, drafted players from the other 10 Major League Soccer teams.

Existing MLS teams were allowed to protect 12 players on their senior roster, and players on the developmental roster were exempt from the draft. Teams were allowed to leave no more than one Senior International player unprotected. After each player was selected, his team was allowed to remove one exposed player from their list. Teams were not able to lose more than three players.

== Expansion Draft ==
Pick	Selecting Team	Player	Position	Previous team
1	Chivas USA	Arturo Torres	M	Los Angeles Galaxy
2	Real Salt Lake	Andy Williams	M	Chicago Fire
3	Chivas USA	Orlando Perez	D	Chicago Fire
4	Real Salt Lake	D.J. Countess	GK	Chicago Fire
5	Chivas USA	Ezra Hendrickson	D	D.C. United
6	Real Salt Lake	Pablo Brenes	M	MetroStars
7	Chivas USA	Francisco Gomez	M	Kansas City Wizards
8	Real Salt Lake	Brian Kamler	M	New England Revolution
9	Chivas USA	Antonio de la Torre	D	Colorado Rapids
10	Real Salt Lake	Nelson Akwari	D	Columbus Crew
11	Chivas USA	Matt Taylor	F	Kansas City Wizards
12	Real Salt Lake	Chris Brown	M	San Jose Earthquakes
13	Chivas USA	Craig Ziadie	D	MetroStars
14	Real Salt Lake	Matt Behncke	D	F.C. Dallas
15	Chivas USA	Jamil Walker	M	San Jose Earthquakes
16	Real Salt Lake	Rusty Pierce	D	New England Revolution
17	Chivas USA	Thiago Martins	F	D.C. United
18	Real Salt Lake	Kevin Ara	M	D.C. United
19	Chivas USA	Jeff Stewart	D	Colorado Rapids
20	Real Salt Lake	Erick Scott	F	Columbus Crew

== Team-by-Team breakdown ==
=== Chicago Fire ===
Exposed	Protected	Exempt
Alexandre Boucicaut (M)	C.J. Brown (D)	Denny Clanton (D)
Scott Buete (M)	Chris Armas (M)	Leonard Griffin (D)
D.J. Countess (GK)	Jim Curtin (D)	Matt Pickens (GK)
Orlando Perez (D)	Kelly Gray (D)	Craig Capano (M)
Henry Ring (GK)	Damani Ralph (F)	
Dipsy Selolwane (F)	Ante Razov (F)	
Evan Whitfield (D)	Nate Jaqua (F)	
Andy Williams (M)	Logan Pause (M)	
	Jesse Marsch (M)	
	Justin Mapp (M)	
	Zach Thornton (GK)	
	Andy Herron (F)	

- Withdrew Evan Whitfield upon selection of Andy Williams (2)
- Withdrew Scott Buete upon selection of Orlando Perez (3)
- Reached maximum upon selection of D.J. Countess (4)

=== Colorado Rapids ===
Exposed	Protected	Exempt
Antonio de la Torre (D)	Joe Cannon (GK)	Ricky Lewis (D)
Daryl Powell (M)	Alberto Delgado (F)	Jordan Cila (F)
Joey DiGiamarino (M)	Ritchie Kotschau (D)	Byron Foss (GK)
Jeff Stewart (D)	Nat Borchers (D)	Michael Erush (M)
Seth Trembly (M)	Kyle Beckerman (M)	Gary Sullivan (D)
Scott Vallow (GK)	Jean Philippe Peguero (F)	
	Rey Ángel Martínez (F)	
	Chris Henderson (M)	
	Mark Chung (M)	
	Matt Crawford (M)	
	Pablo Mastroeni (D)	
	Zizi Roberts (F)	

- Withdrew Seth Trembly upon selection of Antonio de la Torre (9)
- Withdrew Scott Vallow upon selection of Jeff Stewart (19)

=== Columbus Crew ===
Exposed	Protected	Exempt
Nelson Akwari (D)	Jon Busch (GK)	Devin Barclay (F)
Eric Denton (D)	Frankie Hejduk (D)	Danny Szetela (M)
Stephen Herdsman (D)	Robin Fraser (D)	Michael Ritch (F)
Matt Jordan (GK)	Simon Elliott (M)	Jamal Sutton (F)
Manny Lagos (M)	Duncan Oughton (M)	
Brian Maisonneuve (M)	Jeff Cunningham (F)	
Erick Scott (F)	Edson Buddle (F)	
David Testo (M)	Chad Marshall (D)	
Dante Washington (F)	Ross Paule (M)	
	Chris Wingert (D)	
	Tony Sanneh (M)	
	Kyle Martino (M)	

- Withdrew David Testo upon selection of Nelson Akwari (10)
- Draft ended upon selection of Erick Scott (20)

=== D.C. United ===
Exposed	Protected	Exempt
Kevin Ara (M)	Brian Carroll (M)	David Stokes (D)
Ezra Hendrickson (D)	Joshua Gros (M)	Jason Thompson (F)
Tim Lawson (M)	Brandon Prideaux (D)	Nana Kuffour (M)
Thiago Martins (F)	Nick Rimando (GK)	Freddy Adu (M)
Ryan Nelsen (D)	Alecko Eskandarian (F)	
Troy Perkins (GK)	Mike Petke (D)	
Eliseo Quintanilla (M)	Christian Gómez (M)	
Earnie Stewart (M)	Ben Olsen (M)	
	Dema Kovalenko (M)	
	Santino Quaranta (F)	
	Bryan Namoff (D)	
	Jaime Moreno (F)	

- Withdrew Ryan Nelsen upon selection of Ezra Hendrickson (5)
- Withdrew Troy Perkins upon selection of Thiago Martins (17)
- Reached maximum upon selection of Kevin Ara (18)

=== F.C. Dallas ===
Exposed	Protected	Exempt
Matt Behncke (D)	Jeff Cassar (GK)	Clarence Goodson (D)
Scott Garlick (GK)	Cory Gibbs (D)	David Wagenfuhr (D)
Ty Maurin (M)	Carey Talley (D)	Ramón Núñez (M)
Toni Nhleko (F)	Chris Gbandi (D)	
Óscar Pareja (M)	Steve Jolley (D)	
Philip Salyer (D)	Ronnie O'Brien (M)	
	Edward Johnson (F)	
	Brad Davis (M)	
	Milton Reyes (D)	
	Eric Quill (M)	
	Simo Valakari (M)	
	Bobby Rhine (M)	

- Withdrew Philip Salyer upon selection of Matt Behncke (14)

=== Kansas City Wizards ===
Exposed	Protected	Exempt
Francisco Gomez (M)	Nick Garcia (D)	Taylor Graham (D)
Tony Meola (GK)	Shavar Thomas (D)	Justin Detter (F)
Preki (M)	Kerry Zavagnin (M)	Will Hesmer (GK)
Igor Simutenkov (F)	Jose Burciaga Jr. (D)	Khari Stephenson (M)
Matt Taylor (F)	Diego Gutierrez (M)	Brian Roberts (D)
Alex Zotinca (D)	Diego Walsh (M)	
	Jimmy Conrad (D)	
	Jack Jewsbury (M)	
	Josh Wolff (F)	
	Chris Klein (M)	
	Davy Arnaud (F)	
	Bo Oshoniyi (GK)	

- Withdrew Alex Zotinca upon selection of Francisco Gomez (7)
- Withdrew Igor Simutenkov upon selection of Matt Taylor (11)

=== Los Angeles Galaxy ===
Exposed	Protected	Exempt
Paul Broome (D)	Ryan Suarez (D)	Josh Gardner (M)
Dan Popik (GK)	Chris Albright (D)	Guillermo Gonzalez (M)
Marcelo Saragosa (M)	Peter Vagenas (M)	Ned Grabavoy (M)
Arturo Torres (M)	Jovan Kirovski (F)	Alan Gordon (F)
	Sasha Victorine (M)	Scot Thompson (D)
	Cobi Jones (M)	Chris Aloisi (D)
	Tyrone Marshall (D)	
	Alejandro Moreno (F)	
	Carlos Ruíz (F)	
	Kevin Hartman (GK)	
	Danny Califf (D)	
	Joseph Ngwenya (F)	

- Withdrew Paul Broome upon selection of Arturo Torres (1)

=== MetroStars ===
Exposed	Protected	Exempt
Pablo Brenes (M)	Ricardo Clark (M)	Kenny Arena (D)
Sergio Galvan Rey (F)	Chris Leitch (D)	Michael Bradley (M)
Tim Regan (D)	John Wolyniec (F)	Gilberto Flores (M)
Joselito Vaca (M)	Mike Magee (F)	Seth Stammler (D)
Jonny Walker (GK)	Mark Lisi (M)	
Zach Wells (GK)	Jeff Parke (D)	
Craig Ziadie (D)	Cornell Glen (F)	
	Fabian Taylor (F)	
	Amado Guevara (M)	
	Eddie Pope (D)	
	Eddie Gaven (M)	
	Tenywa Bonseu (D)	

- Withdrew Zach Wells upon selection of Pablo Brenes (6)
- Withdrew Jonny Walker upon selection of Craig Ziadie (13)

=== New England Revolution ===
Exposed	Protected	Exempt
Adin Brown (GK)	Matt Reis (GK)	Luke Vercollone (M)
Joe Franchino (D)	Clint Dempsey (M)	Perek Belleh (F)
Brian Kamler (M)	Avery John (D)	Bobby Thompson (M)
Steve Howey (D)	Jay Heaps (D)	Andy Dorman (M)
Carlos Llamosa (D)	José Cancela (M)	
Joe-Max Moore (F)	Pat Noonan (F)	
Rusty Pierce (D)	Steve Ralston (M)	
	Richie Baker (M)	
	Taylor Twellman (F)	
	Shalrie Joseph (D)	
	Marshall Leonard (D)	
	Félix Brillant (F)	

- Withdrew Joe Franchino upon selection of Brian Kamler (8)
- Withdrew Carlos Llamosa upon selection of Rusty Pierce (16)

=== San Jose Earthquakes ===
Exposed	Protected	Exempt
Jeff Agoos (D)	Eddie Robinson (D)	Arturo Alvarez (M)
Chris Brown (F)	Ramiro Corrales (M)	Roger Levesque (F)
Jon Conway (GK)	Ian Russell (M)	Ryan Cochrane (D)
Ronnie Ekelund (M)	Richard Mulrooney (M)	Tighe Dombrowski (M)
Wes Hart (D)	Brian Mullan (M)	Steve Cronin (GK)
Chris Roner (D)	Landon Donovan (F)	
Jamil Walker (M)	Dwayne De Rosario (F)	
	Craig Waibel (D)	
	Todd Dunivant (D)	
	Pat Onstad (GK)	
	Troy Dayak (D)	
	Brian Ching (F)	

- Withdrew Jon Conway upon selection of Chris Brown (12)
- Withdrew Wes Hart upon selection of Jamil Walker (16)
