= 2004 Columbus Crew season =

Columbus Crew
2004 season
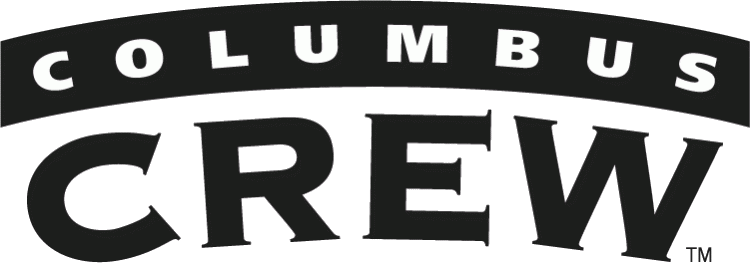
- Investor-operators: Lamar Hunt; Clark Hunt; Dan Hunt; Lamar Hunt Jr. Sharron Hunt Munson; Ron Pizzuti and a group of local investors
- Head Coach: Greg Andrulis
- Stadium: Columbus Crew Stadium
- Major League Soccer: Conference: 1st Overall: 1st
- MLS Cup playoffs: Conference semifinals
- U.S. Open Cup: Fourth round
- Top goalscorer: League: Edson Buddle (11); All: Edson Buddle (13)
- Highest home attendance: 23,775 (9/25 v. DC)
- Lowest home attendance: 5,426 (7/20 v. CHI)
- Average home league attendance: 16,769 (74.3%)
- Biggest win: CHI 1-3 CLB (5/23); CLB 2–0 CHI (7/3); CLB 3–1 LA (9/4); CLB 4–2 NY (9/18)
- Biggest defeat: CLB 1-3 NY (4/3); LA 2-0 CLB (4/24); DC 3-1 CLB (6/19)
Home colors	Away colors

The 2004 Columbus Crew season was the club's ninth season of existence and their ninth consecutive season in Major League Soccer, the top flight of soccer in the United States. The first match of the season was on April 3 against NY/NJ MetroStars. It was the fourth season under head coach Greg Andrulis.

The Crew won their first MLS trophy this season, the Supporters' Shield, by leading the league with 49 points. They would be upset by the New England Revolution by an aggregate score of 2–1 in the conference semifinals. They reached the round of 16 in the U.S. Open Cup.

This would be the final season for longtime Crew members Jeff Cunningham (who was traded to the Colorado Rapids) and Brian Maisonneuve (who retired). This was also the first season for longtime Crew defender Chad Marshall, the second pick of the draft.

== Roster ==
As of October 31, 2004

Note: Flags indicate national team as defined under FIFA eligibility rules; some limited exceptions apply. Players may hold more than one non-FIFA nationality.

No.	Pos.	Nation	Player
1	GK	USA	Jon Busch
2	DF	USA	Frankie Hejduk
4	DF	USA	Robin Fraser (captain)
5	DF	USA	Stephen Herdsman
6	DF	USA	Eric Denton
7	DF	NZL	Simon Elliott
8	DF	NZL	Duncan Oughton
9	FW	CRC	Erick Scott
10	MF	USA	Brian Maisonneuve
11	FW	USA	Jeff Cunningham
12	FW	USA	Edson Buddle

No.	Pos.	Nation	Player
14	DF	USA	Chad Marshall
15	FW	USA	Devin Barclay
16	MF	USA	Ross Paule
17	MF	USA	Danny Szetela
18	DF	USA	Nelson Akwari
19	DF	USA	Chris Wingert
20	MF	USA	Tony Sanneh
21	MF	USA	Kyle Martino
22	MF	USA	Manny Lagos
23	FW	USA	David Testo (on loan Richmond Kickers)
24	GK	USA	Matt Jordan
25	MF	USA	Michael Ritch
27	FW	USA	Jamal Sutton
99	DF	USA	Dante Washington

== Technical Staff ==
Position	Staff
President/General Manager	(United States) Jim Smith until July 9 (United States) Mark McCullers after July 9
Head Coach	(United States) Greg Andrulis
Assistant Coach	(United States) John Murphy
Assistant Coach	(Poland) Robert Warzycha
Head Trainer	(United States) Craig Devine
Team Manager	(United States) Tucker Walther

== Non-competitive ==
=== Preseason ===
The Crew started their slate of preseason matches in Bradenton, FL. For these initial games, they brought in Paweł Drumlak on trial. The Crew then went to Spain for another series of preseason matches against local opponents before returning to the US and winning the first Carolina Challenge Cup.

February 17 Friendly	Columbus Crew	3-0	U-19 Select Club Team	Bradenton, FL
3:30 PM EST	Paule; Ritch; Testo	Report		Stadium: IMG Academy

February 19 Friendly	Columbus Crew	2-1	U.S. U-17 National Team	Bradenton, FL
10:00 AM EST	Hidalgo 32'; Soroka 76'	Report	Ritch 27'	Stadium: IMG Academy

February 21 Friendly	Columbus Crew	4-0	Kansas City Wizards	Tampa, FL
10:00 AM EST	Cunningham 3' (pen.), 17'; Ritch 37'; Crew 67'	Report		Stadium: University of South Florida

February 22 Friendly	Columbus Crew	2-2	U.S. U-20 National Team	Bradenton, FL
11:00 AM EST	Paule 44'; Sutton 47'	Report	Barrett 3'; Weah 75'	Stadium: IMG Academy

February 23 Friendly	Lynn Fighting Knights	Cancelled	Columbus Crew	Boca Raton, FL
3:30 PM EST		Report		Stadium: Lynn University

February 23 Friendly	UCF Golden Knights	0-0	Columbus Crew	Bradenton, FL
3:30 PM EST		Report		Stadium: IMG Academy

February 25 Friendly	Columbus Crew	v	Colorado Rapids	Bradenton, FL
10:00 AM EST				Stadium: IMG Academy

February 26 Friendly	Columbus Crew	1-0	U.S. U-20 National Team	Bradenton, FL
9:00 AM EST	Cunningham	Report		Stadium: IMG Academy

February 28 Friendly	Columbus Crew	4-0	Dayton Flyers	Columbus, OH
	Barclay 25'; Martino 56'; Sutton 71'; Buddle 82'	Report		Stadium: Columbus Crew Stadium; Attendance: 500

March 4 Friendly	Girona FC	3-3	Columbus Crew	Girona, Spain
	55'; 57'; 65'	Report	Buddle 37', 39'; Ritch 85'	Stadium: Estadi Montilivi

March 9 Friendly	CE Sabadell FC	1-1	Columbus Crew	Sabadell, Spain
	14'	Report	Martino 42'	Stadium: Estadi de la Nova Creu Alta

March 11 Friendly	FC Barcelona B	0-4	Columbus Crew	Barcelona, Spain
5:00 AM EST		Report	Elliott 29'; Martino 36'; Cunningham 44', (yellow card); Hejduk 70'	Stadium: Mini Estadi

March 20 Carolina Challenge Cup	Wilmington Hammerheads	0-2	Columbus Crew	Wilmington, NC
7:30 PM EST		Report	Marshall 2'; Hejduk 86'	Stadium: Legion Stadium

March 24 Carolina Challenge Cup	Charleston Battery	1-3	Columbus Crew	Charleston, SC
7:30 PM EST	Conway 12'	Report	Paule 18'; Hejduk 65'; Marshall 69'	Stadium: Blackbaud Stadium; Attendance: 1,620; Referee: Ricardo Salazar; Assistant referees: Robert Fereday; Nathan Clement

March 27 Carolina Challenge Cup	Columbus Crew	0-0	D.C. United	Charleston, SC
8:15 PM EST		Report		Stadium: Blackbaud Stadium; Attendance: 4,803

=== Midseason ===
During the season played a couple charity matches. In the Keith Evans Memorial Match against the Pittsburgh Riverhounds, the Crew brought in Kirk Harwat from the Akron Zips.

April 14 Connor Senn Memorial Game	Ohio State Buckeyes	1-5	Columbus Crew	Columbus, OH
7:00 PM EDT	Nugent 46'	Report	Cunningham 4' (pen.); Hejduk 38'; Elliott 44'; Testo 75'; Ritch 87'	Stadium: Jesse Owens Memorial Stadium; Attendance: 948

May 18 Keith Evans Memorial Match	Columbus Crew	6-0	Pittsburgh Riverhounds	Obetz, OH
7:00 PM EDT	Ritch (pen.); Sutton,, Harwat,			Stadium: Crew Training Center

== Competitive ==
=== Overview ===
Competition	First match	Last match	Starting round	Final position	Record							
Competition	First match	Last match	Starting round	Final position	Pld	W	D	L	GF	GA	GD	Win %
Major League Soccer	April 3, 2004	October 16, 2004	Matchday 1	Winner	30	12	13	5	40	32	+8	40.00
MLS Cup Playoffs	October 23, 2004	October 31, 2004	Conference Semifinals	Conference Semifinals	2	0	1	1	1	2	−1	0.00
U.S. Open Cup	June 30, 2004	July 20, 2004	Third Round	Fourth Round	2	1	0	1	3	4	−1	50.00
Total					34	13	14	7	44	38	+6	38.24

Source: Competitions

=== MLS ===
==== Standings ====
===== Eastern Conference =====
Pos	Team	Pld	W	L	T	GF	GA	GD	Pts	Qualification
1	Columbus Crew	30	12	5	13	40	32	+8	49	Qualification for the conference semifinals
2	D.C. United	30	11	10	9	43	42	+1	42	Qualification for the conference semifinals
3	MetroStars	30	11	12	7	47	49	−2	40	Qualification for the conference semifinals
4	New England Revolution	30	8	13	9	42	43	−1	33	Qualification for the conference semifinals
5	Chicago Fire	30	8	13	9	36	44	−8	33	

Source: MLS

===== Overall table =====
Pos	Team	Pld	W	L	T	GF	GA	GD	Pts	
1	Columbus Crew (S)	30	12	5	13	40	32	+8	49	
2	Kansas City Wizards	30	14	9	7	38	30	+8	49	Qualification for the CONCACAF Champions' Cup
3	Los Angeles Galaxy	30	11	9	10	42	40	+2	43	
4	D.C. United (C)	30	11	10	9	43	42	+1	42	Qualification for the CONCACAF Champions' Cup
5	Colorado Rapids	30	10	9	11	29	32	−3	41	

Source: MLS
Rules for classification: 1) points; 2) head-to-head record; 3) goal difference; 4) number of goals scored
(C) MLS Cup champions; (S) Supporters' Shield winners

==== Results summary ====
Overall								Home						Away					
Pld	Pts	W	L	T	GF	GA	GD	W	L	T	GF	GA	GD	W	L	T	GF	GA	GD
30	49	12	5	13	40	32	+8	8	2	5	26	18	+8	4	3	8	14	14	0

Source: MLS standings
Pld = Matches played; Pts = Points; W = Matches won; T = Matches tied; L = Matches lost; GF = Goals for; GA = Goals against; GD = Goal difference

==== Results by round ====
Round	1	2	3	4	5	6	7	8	9	10	11	12	13	14	15	16	17	18	19	20	21	22	23	24	25	26	27	28	29	30
Stadium	H	A	A	H	A	H	A	H	A	H	A	H	H	A	H	A	H	A	A	H	H	A	H	A	H	H	H	A	A	A
Result	L	L	L	T	T	W	W	W	W	T	L	L	W	T	T	T	W	T	T	W	T	T	W	W	W	W	T	W	T	T

Source: schedule
A = Away; H = Home; W = Win; L = Loss; T = Tie

==== Match results ====
April 3 1	Columbus Crew	1-3	NY/NJ MetroStars	Columbus, OH
7:30 PM EST	Hejduk (yellow card) 13', (goal) 30'; Martino (yellow card) 56'; Cunningham (yellow card) 59'; Elliott (yellow card) 83'	Report	Magee 40'; Wolyniec 52'; Ziadie (yellow card) 57'; Clark (yellow card) 86'; Guevara 88'	Stadium: Columbus Crew Stadium; Attendance: 20,356; Referee: Abbey Okulaja; Assistant referees: Rob Fereday; Kermit Quisenberry; Fourth official: Ricardo Salazar

April 17 2	Kansas City Wizards	1-0	Columbus Crew	Kansas City, MO
8:30 PM EDT	Arnaud 42'; Zotincă (yellow card) 45'; Thomas (yellow card) 53'	Report	Hejduk (red card) 45'	Stadium: Arrowhead Stadium; Attendance: 9,682; Referee: Ricardo Valenzuela; Assistant referees: Craig Lowry; George Vergara; Fourth official: Hector Tobon

April 24 3	Los Angeles Galaxy	2-0	Columbus Crew	Carson, CA
10:00 PM EDT	Kirovski (yellow card) 32'; Saragosa (yellow card) 41'; Ruíz 59' (pen.), 83'	Report	Fraser (yellow card) 42'; Maisonneuve (yellow card) 45+1'; Denton (yellow card) 58'	Stadium: The Home Depot Center; Attendance: 20,317; Referee: Ricardo Salazar; Assistant referees: Nate Clement; Richard Eddy; Fourth official: Ramon Hernandez

May 1 4	Columbus Crew	0-0	Dallas Burn	Columbus, OH
7:30 PM EDT	Buddle (yellow card) 24'; Maisonneuve (yellow card) 55'	Report	Gbandi (yellow card) 30'; Valakari (yellow card) 76'	Stadium: Columbus Crew Stadium; Attendance: 13,271; Referee: Ramon Hernandez; Assistant referees: Jose Andrade; Steve Taylor; Fourth official: Alex Prus

May 8 5	D.C. United	1-1	Columbus Crew	Washington, D.C.
7:30 PM EDT	Kovalenko 4'; Gros (yellow card) 63'; Nelson (yellow card) 72'; Prideaux (yellow card) 90'; Stewart (yellow card) 90+1'	Report	Paule 90+1'; Fraser (red card) 90+4'	Stadium: Robert F. Kennedy Memorial Stadium; Attendance: 18,376; Referee: Terry Vaughn; Assistant referees: Chris Strickland; Jose Corro; Fourth official: Andrew Chapin

May 15 6	Columbus Crew	1-0	New England Revolution	Columbus, OH
4:00 PM EDT	Buddle 41'; Herdsman (yellow card) 54'; Akwari (yellow card) 59'	Report	Dempsey (yellow card) 48'	Stadium: Columbus Crew Stadium; Attendance: 16,694; Referee: Michael Kennedy; Assistant referees: George Gansner; Fabio Tovar; Fourth official: Brent Sorg

May 23 7	Chicago Fire	1-3	Columbus Crew	Chicago, IL
4:00 PM EDT	Curtin (yellow card) 33'; Ralph 49'; Razov (yellow card) 86'	Report	Hejduk (yellow card) 14'; Denton (yellow card) 17'; Busch (yellow card) 68'; Paule (yellow card) 83'; Cunningham 32' (pen.); Martino 55'; Ritch 59'	Stadium: Soldier Field; Attendance: 10,854; Referee: Ali Saheli; Assistant referees: George Vergara; Bill Dittmar; Fourth official: Michael Kennedy

May 29 8	Columbus Crew	1-0	San Jose Earthquakes	Columbus, OH
7:30 PM EDT	Maisonneuve (yellow card) 25'; Denton (yellow card) 61'; Cunningham 69'; Lagos (yellow card) 73'; Hejduk (yellow card) 90'	Report	Hart (yellow card) 65'	Stadium: Columbus Crew Stadium; Attendance: 14,555; Referee: Mark Geiger; Assistant referees: Craig Lowry; Kermit Quisenberry; Fourth official: Kevin Stott

June 6 9	New England Revolution	1-2	Columbus Crew	Foxborough, MA
4:00 PM EDT	Cancela 62' (pen.); John (yellow card) 67'; Heaps (yellow card) 67'	Report	Hejduk 53'; Cunningham 68' (pen.)	Stadium: Gillette Stadium; Attendance: 7,047; Referee: Ricardo Salazar; Assistant referees: Nate Clement; Jose Corro; Fourth official: Niko Bratsis

June 12 10	Columbus Crew	2-2	Kansas City Wizards	Columbus, OH
7:30 PM EDT	Cunningham 18', 63' (pen.)	Report	Conrad 21'; Thomas 24'; Gutiérrez (yellow card) 70'	Stadium: Columbus Crew Stadium; Attendance: 13,680; Referee: Marcel Yonan; Assistant referees: George Gansner; Jorge De La Bandera; Fourth official: Mikael Lundqvist

June 19 11	D.C. United	3-1	Columbus Crew	Washington, D.C.
7:30 PM EDT	Moreno 6'; Eskandarian 33', (yellow card) 34', (goal) 45'; Kovalenko (yellow card) 45+2'	Report	Akwari (yellow card) 19'; Lagos 90'	Stadium: Robert F. Kennedy Memorial Stadium; Attendance: 17,176; Referee: Kevin Terry; Assistant referees: Bill Dittmar; Steve Taylor; Fourth official: Ben Jones

June 26 12	Columbus Crew	1-2	Colorado Rapids	Columbus, OH
7:30 PM EDT	Lagos (yellow card) 50'; Denton (yellow card) 64'; Buddle 89'	Report	Philippe 37'; Denton 45' (o.g.); Borchers (yellow card) 62'; Cannon (yellow card) 80'; Cila (yellow card) 85'; Mastroeni (yellow card) 90'	Stadium: Columbus Crew Stadium; Attendance: 13,407; Referee: Jair Marrufo; Assistant referees: Chip Reed; Kenneth Kaplan; Fourth official: Hilario Grajeda

July 3 13	Columbus Crew	2-0	Chicago Fire	Columbus, OH
7:30 PM EDT	Buddle 43'; Cunningham 44'; Elliott (yellow card) 50'; Oughton (yellow card) 54'	Report	Pause (yellow card) 53'; Curtin (yellow card) 72'; Whitfield (red card) 85'	Stadium: Columbus Crew Stadium; Attendance: 13,059; Referee: Baldomero Toledo; Assistant referees: Greg Barkey; Bahij Salman; Fourth official: Hilario Grajeda

July 10 14	Dallas Burn	0-0	Columbus Crew	Dallas, TX
8:30 PM EDT	Reyes (yellow card) 22'; O'Brien (yellow card) 90'; Gbandi (yellow card) 90+3'	Report		Stadium: Cotton Bowl; Attendance: 7,223; Referee: Terry Vaughn; Assistant referees: David Bragg; Adam Garner; Fourth official: Troy Travis

July 17 15	Columbus Crew	1-1	New England Revolution	Columbus, OH
7:30 PM EDT	Martino 45'; Wingert (yellow card) 56'; Elliott (yellow card) 58'; Buddle (yellow card) 70'	Report	Dempsey 31'; Baker (yellow card) 42'; John (yellow card) 64'	Stadium: Columbus Crew Stadium; Attendance: 13,373; Referee: Abbey Okulaja; Assistant referees: Chip Reed; Jorge De La Bandera; Fourth official: Mikael Lundqvist

July 24 16	Colorado Rapids	0-0	Columbus Crew	Denver, CO
5:00 PM EDT	DiGiamarino (yellow card) 42'; Borchers (yellow card) 90+2'	Report	Wingert (yellow card) 78'; Busch (yellow card) 90'	Stadium: Invesco Field at Mile High; Attendance: 8,437; Referee: Michael Kennedy; Assistant referees: Emiliano Monje; Steve Taylor; Fourth official: Hilario Grajeda

July 28 17	Columbus Crew	2-1	Dallas Burn	Columbus, OH
7:30 PM EDT	Buddle 38', 43'	Report	Talley (yellow card) 16'; Kreis 59'; Goodson (yellow card) 79'; O'Brien (yellow card) 86'; Pareja (yellow card) 90'	Stadium: Columbus Crew Stadium; Attendance: 13,069; Referee: Roni Canales; Assistant referees: David Bragg; Bill Dittmar; Fourth official: Ricardo Salazar

August 7 18	New England Revolution	2-2	Columbus Crew	Foxborough, MA
2:00 PM EDT	Ralston 28', (yellow card) 45'; Noonan 45+3'	Report	Buddle (yellow card) 19', (goal) 45+1'; Martino 20'; Busch (yellow card) 28'	Stadium: Gillette Stadium; Attendance: 9,156; Referee: Kevin Terry; Assistant referees: Thomas Supple; Chip Reed; Fourth official: Erich Simmons

August 14 19	Los Angeles Galaxy	0-0	Columbus Crew	Carson, CA
10:00 PM EDT		Report		Stadium: The Home Depot Center; Attendance: 21,285; Referee: Michael Kennedy; Assistant referees: Kermit Quisenberry; Fabio Tovar; Fourth official: Ramon Hernandez

August 18 20	Columbus Crew	2-1	Kansas City Wizards	Columbus, OH
7:30 PM EDT	Paule 43', (yellow card) 45'; Martino 90+2'	Report	Arnaud (yellow card) 26'; Graham 79'	Stadium: Columbus Crew Stadium; Attendance: 14,580; Referee: Alex Prus; Assistant referees: Jose Corro; Chip Reed; Fourth official: Hilario Grajeda

August 21 21	Columbus Crew	2-2	D.C. United	Columbus, OH
7:30 PM EDT	Hejduk (yellow card) 16'; Oughton 42'; Paule 54'; Akwari (yellow card) 56'; Wingert (yellow card) 58'; Fraser (yellow card) 79'; Marshall (yellow card) 90+2'	Report	Carroll (yellow card) 32'; Eskandarian 35', (yellow card) 67'; Hendrickson (yellow card) 53'; Moreno 76' (pen.)	Stadium: Columbus Crew Stadium; Attendance: 23,849; Referee: Marcel Yonan; Assistant referees: Fabio Tovar; Emiliano Monje; Fourth official: Abbey Okulaja

August 29 22	NY/NJ MetroStars	1-1	Columbus Crew	East Rutherford, NJ
6:00 PM EDT	Wolyniec 21'; Pope (yellow card) 29'; Magee (yellow card) 35'; Guevara (yellow card) 87' (yellow-red card) 90+2'	Report	Paule 35' (pen.); Akwari (yellow card) 50'; Testo (yellow card) 87'; Szetela (yellow card) 90+1'	Stadium: Giants Stadium; Attendance: 14,397; Referee: Jair Marrufo; Assistant referees: Rob Fereday; Kenneth Kaplan; Fourth official: Roni Canales

September 4 23	Columbus Crew	3-1	Los Angeles Galaxy	Columbus, OH
7:30 PM EDT	Paule 26', 41', 68'; Wingert (yellow card) 70'; Ritch (yellow card) 81'	Report	Herzog (yellow card) 42'; Ngwenya 45+1'; Suarez (yellow card) 66'	Stadium: Columbus Crew Stadium; Attendance: 17,928; Referee: Mark Geiger; Assistant referees: Craig Lowry; Richard Eddy; Fourth official: Hilario Grajeda

September 8 24	San Jose Earthquakes	0-1	Columbus Crew	San Jose, CA
10:30 PM EDT		Report	Sanneh 90+1'	Stadium: Spartan Stadium; Attendance: 7,137; Referee: Kevin Terry; Assistant referees: Paul Scott; Emiliano Monje; Fourth official: Ricardo Valenzuela

September 18 25	Columbus Crew	4-2	NY/NJ MetroStars	Columbus, OH
7:30 PM EDT	Buddle 9', 52', 65', 74'	Report	Wolyniec 6'; Gaven 49'	Stadium: Columbus Crew Stadium; Attendance: 18,233; Referee: Kevin Stott; Assistant referees: Thomas Supple; Bill Dittmar; Fourth official: Hilario Grajeda

September 25 26	Columbus Crew	1-0	D.C. United	Columbus, OH
7:30 PM EDT	Sanneh 10', (yellow card) 72'; Oughton (yellow card) 79'	Report	Nelsen (yellow card) 20' (yellow-red card) 44'; Stewart (yellow card) 80'; Eskandarian (yellow card) 82'	Stadium: Columbus Crew Stadium; Attendance: 23,775; Referee: Jair Marrufo; Assistant referees: George Gansner; Jose Corro; Fourth official: Baldomero Toledo

October 2 27	Columbus Crew	3-3	Chicago Fire	Columbus, OH
7:30 PM EDT	Martino 45' (pen.); Cunningham 56', 64'; Sanneh (yellow card) 80'	Report	Ralph 14' (pen.); Whitfield (yellow card) 26'; Jaqua (yellow card) 15' (yellow-red card) 36'; Marsch (yellow card) 56'; Herron 59', 80'	Stadium: Columbus Crew Stadium; Attendance: 23,250; Referee: Kevin Terry; Assistant referees: Rob Fereday; Fabio Tovar; Fourth official: Andrew Chapin

October 6 28	Chicago Fire	0-1	Columbus Crew	Chicago, IL
8:30 PM EDT	Buete (yellow card) 90'	Report	Buddle 59'	Stadium: Soldier Field; Attendance: 10,158; Referee: Terry Vaughn; Assistant referees: Kermit Quisenberry; Bill Dittmar; Fourth official: Abbey Okulaja

October 9 29	NY/NJ MetroStars	1-1	Columbus Crew	East Rutherford, NJ
7:30 PM EDT	Regan (yellow card) 62'; Rey 71' (pen.)	Report	Cunningham 26'; Szetela (yellow card) 39'; Maisonneuve (yellow card) 81'	Stadium: Giants Stadium; Attendance: 15,007; Referee: Ricardo Salazar; Assistant referees: Thomas Supple; Richard Eddy; Fourth official: Alex Prus

October 16 30	Colorado Rapids	1-1	Columbus Crew	Denver, CO
9:00 PM EDT	Henderson 47' (pen.); Crawford (yellow card) 84'	Report	Oughton 40'; Szetela (yellow card) 63'; Fraser (yellow card) 78'	Stadium: Invesco Field at Mile High; Attendance: 12,412; Referee: Michael Kennedy; Assistant referees: Chris Strickland; Emiliano Monje; Fourth official: Hilario Grajeda

=== MLS Cup Playoffs ===
==== Conference Semifinals ====
October 23 Leg 1	New England Revolution	1-0	Columbus Crew	Foxborough, MA
7:30 PM EDT	Joseph (yellow card) 4'; John 25', (yellow card) 58'; Heaps (yellow card) 82'	Report	Buddle (yellow card) 26'; Fraser (yellow card) 35'	Stadium: Gillette Stadium; Attendance: 5,679; Referee: Michael Kennedy; Assistant referees: Craig Lowry; Steven Davidson; Fourth official: Abbey Okulaja

October 31 Leg 2	Columbus Crew	1-1 (1-2 agg.)	New England Revolution	Columbus, OH
5:00 PM EST	Martino (yellow card) 26'; Hejduk (yellow card) 68'; Buddle 90+2'	Report	Twellman 81'	Stadium: Columbus Crew Stadium; Attendance: 15,224; Referee: Alex Prus; Assistant referees: Kermit Quisenberry; Rob Fereday; Fourth official: Kevin Terry

=== U.S. Open Cup ===
June 30 Third Round	Columbus Crew (MLS) Ohio	2-1	New York Syracuse Salty Dogs (A-L)	Columbus, OH
7:30 PM EDT	Buddle 70'; Paule 90+1' (pen.)	Report	Rivas (yellow card) 4'; Lara (yellow card) 20'; Schweitzer 81'	Stadium: Columbus Crew Stadium; Referee: Hilario Grajeda

July 20 Fourth Round	Columbus Crew (MLS) Ohio	1-2 (a.e.t.)	Illinois Chicago Fire (MLS)	Columbus, OH
7:30 PM EDT	Hejduk 27', (yellow card) 33'; Martino (yellow card) 34'; Maisonneuve (yellow card) 96'; Buddle (red card) 97'	Report	Williams (yellow card) 13'; Pause (yellow card) 19'; Clanton (yellow card) 68'; Ralph 66' (pen.), 106'	Stadium: Columbus Crew Stadium; Attendance: 5,426; Referee: Ali Saheli; Assistant referees: Nathan Clement; Jeffrey Mellen; Fourth official: Maikael Lundqvist

== Statistics ==
=== Appearances and goals ===
Under "Apps" for each section, the first number represents the number of starts, and the second number represents appearances as a substitute.

No.	Pos	Nat	Player	Total		MLS		MLS Cup Playoffs		U.S. Open Cup	
No.	Pos	Nat	Player	Apps	Goals	Apps	Goals	Apps	Goals	Apps	Goals
1	GK	(United States) USA	Jon Busch	33	0	29+0	0	2+0	0	2+0	0
2	DF	(United States) USA	Frankie Hejduk	23	3	19+1	2	2+0	0	1+0	1
4	DF	(United States) USA	Robin Fraser	32	0	28+0	0	2+0	0	2+0	0
5	DF	(United States) USA	Stephen Herdsman	9	0	8+0	0	0+0	0	0+1	0
6	DF	(United States) USA	Eric Denton	20	0	16+2	0	0+0	0	1+1	0
7	DF	(New Zealand) NZL	Simon Elliott	30	0	26+1	0	2+0	0	1+0	0
8	DF	(New Zealand) NZL	Duncan Oughton	32	2	21+7	2	2+0	0	2+0	0
9	FW	(Costa Rica) CRC	Erick Scott	7	0	2+4	0	0+0	0	1+0	0
10	MF	(United States) USA	Brian Maisonneuve	11	0	5+4	0	0+0	0	1+1	0
11	FW	(United States) USA	Jeff Cunningham	33	9	19+11	9	0+2	0	1+0	0
12	FW	(United States) USA	Edson Buddle	28	13	20+4	11	1+1	1	2+0	1
14	DF	(United States) USA	Chad Marshall	32	0	27+1	0	2+0	0	2+0	0
15	FW	(United States) USA	Devin Barclay	4	0	1+2	0	0+0	0	0+1	0
16	MF	(United States) USA	Ross Paule	29	8	23+2	7	2+0	0	2+0	1
17	MF	(United States) USA	Danny Szetela	10	0	4+4	0	0+2	0	0+0	0
18	DF	(United States) USA	Nelson Akwari	19	0	16+3	0	0+0	0	0+0	0
19	DF	(United States) USA	Chris Wingert	26	0	16+6	0	2+0	0	2+0	0
20	MF	(United States) USA	Tony Sanneh	8	2	6+0	2	2+0	0	0+0	0
21	MF	(United States) USA	Kyle Martino	33	5	27+2	5	2+0	0	1+1	0
22	MF	(United States) USA	Manny Lagos	19	1	8+10	1	0+0	0	1+0	0
23	FW	(United States) USA	David Testo	16	0	4+12	0	0+0	0	0+0	0
24	GK	(United States) USA	Matt Jordan	1	0	1+0	0	0+0	0	0+0	0
25	FW	(United States) USA	Michael Ritch	13	1	4+8	1	0+0	0	0+1	0
27	FW	(United States) USA	Jamal Sutton	1	0	0+1	0	0+0	0	0+0	0
99	FW	(United States) USA	Dante Washington	3	0	0+1	0	1+1	0	0+0	0
			Own goal	0	0	-	0	-	0	-	0
Players who left Columbus during the season:
17	DF	(United States) USA	Jake Traeger	1	0	0+1	0	0+0	0	0+0	0
31	GK	(United States) USA	Clint Baumstark	0	0	0+0	0	0+0	0	0+0	0

=== Disciplinary record ===
No.	Pos.	Name	MLS		MLS Cup Playoffs		U.S. Open Cup		Total	
No.	Pos.	Name	Yellow card	Red card	Yellow card	Red card	Yellow card	Red card	Yellow card	Red card
1	GK	(United States) Jon Busch	3	0	0	0	0	0	3	0
2	DF	(United States) Frankie Hejduk	4	1	1	0	1	0	6	1
4	DF	(United States) Robin Fraser	3	1	1	0	0	0	4	1
5	DF	(United States) Stephen Herdsman	1	0	0	0	0	0	1	0
6	DF	(United States) Eric Denton	4	0	0	0	0	0	4	0
7	DF	(New Zealand) Simon Elliott	3	0	0	0	0	0	3	0
8	DF	(New Zealand) Duncan Oughton	2	0	0	0	0	0	2	0
9	FW	(Costa Rica) Erick Scott	0	0	0	0	0	0	0	0
10	MF	(United States) Brian Maisonneuve	4	0	0	0	1	0	5	0
11	FW	(United States) Jeff Cunningham	1	0	0	0	0	0	1	0
12	FW	(United States) Edson Buddle	3	0	1	0	0	1	4	1
14	DF	(United States) Chad Marshall	1	0	0	0	0	0	1	0
15	FW	(United States) Devin Barclay	0	0	0	0	0	0	0	0
16	MF	(United States) Ross Paule	2	0	0	0	0	0	2	0
17	MF	(United States) Danny Szetela	3	0	0	0	0	0	3	0
18	DF	(United States) Nelson Akwari	4	0	0	0	0	0	4	0
19	DF	(United States) Chris Wingert	4	0	0	0	0	0	4	0
20	MF	(United States) Tony Sanneh	2	0	0	0	0	0	2	0
21	MF	(United States) Kyle Martino	1	0	1	0	1	0	3	0
22	MF	(United States) Manny Lagos	2	0	0	0	0	0	2	0
23	FW	(United States) David Testo	1	0	0	0	0	0	1	0
24	GK	(United States) Matt Jordan	0	0	0	0	0	0	0	0
25	FW	(United States) Michael Ritch	1	0	0	0	0	0	1	0
27	FW	(United States) Jamal Sutton	0	0	0	0	0	0	0	0
99	FW	(United States) Dante Washington	0	0	0	0	0	0	0	0
Players who left Columbus during the season:
17	DF	(United States) Jake Traeger	0	0	0	0	0	0	0	0
31	GK	(United States) Clint Baumstark	0	0	0	0	0	0	0	0

=== Clean sheets ===
No.	Name	MLS	MLS Cup Playoffs	U.S. Open Cup	Total	Games Played
1	(United States) Jon Busch	10	0	0	0	33
24	(United States) Matt Jordan	0	0	0	0	1
Players who left Columbus during the season:
31	(United States) Clint Baumstark	0	0	0	0	0

== Transfers ==
=== In ===
Pos.	Player	Transferred from	Fee/notes	Date	Source
MF	(New Zealand) Simon Elliott	(United States) Los Angeles Galaxy	Traded for a first round draft pick in the 2004 MLS SuperDraft	January 12, 2004	
MF	(United States) Manny Lagos	(United States) Los Angeles Galaxy	Traded for a third round draft pick in the 2005 MLS SuperDraft	January 13, 2004	
DF	(United States) Robin Fraser	(United States) Colorado Rapids	Traded for a second round draft pick in the 2004 MLS SuperDraft	January 14, 2004	
DF	(United States) Chad Marshall	(United States) Stanford Cardinal	Drafted in round 1 of the 2004 MLS SuperDraft	January 16, 2004	
DF	(United States) Chris Wingert	(United States) St. John's Red Storm	Drafted in round 2 of the 2004 MLS SuperDraft	January 16, 2004	
DF	(United States) Stephen Herdsman	(United States) Colorado Rapids	Traded for a third round draft pick in the 2004 MLS SuperDraft	January 16, 2004	
FW	(United States) Jamal Sutton	(United States) Southwest Missouri State Bears	Drafted in round 4 of the 2004 MLS SuperDraft. Signed developmental contract on March 26, 2004.	January 16, 2004	
FW	(United States) Devin Barclay	(United States) D.C. United	Traded for a fourth round draft pick in the 2005 MLS SuperDraft	January 30, 2004	
FW	(Costa Rica) Erick Scott	(Costa Rica) Liga Deportiva Alajuelense	Signed via discovery	March 26, 2004	
GK	(United States) Matt Jordan	(Denmark) Odense Boldklub	Transfer, terms undisclosed	April 2, 2004	
MF	(United States) Danny Szetela	(United States) IMG Soccer Academy	Allocated via lottery	July 22, 2004	
DF	(United States) Tony Sanneh	(United States) 1. FC Nürnberg	Allocated by Major League Soccer	August 27, 2004	
FW	(United States) Dante Washington	(United States) Virginia Beach Mariners	Multi-year contract	October 8, 2004	
FW	(United States) David Testo	(United States) Richmond Kickers	Loan contract buy option triggered	December 31, 2004	

=== Loan in ===
Pos.	Player	Parent club	Length/Notes	Beginning	End	Source
FW	(United States) David Testo	(United States) Richmond Kickers	Signed via discovery. One-year loan with an option to purchase contract.	February 20, 2004	End of Season	
GK	(United States) Clint Baumstark	(United States) MLS Pool	Multiple loans	April 17, 2004; June 12, 2004; September 4, 2004	May 1, 2004; July 24, 2004; September 18, 2004	

=== Out ===
Pos.	Player	Transferred to	Fee/notes	Date	Source
GK	(United States) Tom Presthus	Retired		January 14, 2004	
MF	(Brazil) Diego Walsh	(United States) Kansas City Wizards	Traded for a third round draft pick in the 2004 MLS SuperDraft	January 15, 2004	
FW	(United States) Brian McBride	(England) Fulham F.C.	Transfer, $1,500,000	January 20, 2004	
FW	(Guatemala) Freddy García	(Guatemala) C.S.D. Municipal	Transfer, terms undisclosed	February 12, 2004	
DF	(United States) Mike Clark	Retired		March 16, 2004	
DF	(United States) Jake Traeger	Columbus Crew Reserves	Placed on waivers	July 22, 2004	
DF	(United States) Nelson Akwari	(United States) Real Salt Lake	Selected 10th in the 2004 MLS Expansion Draft	November 19, 2004	
FW	(United States) Erick Scott	(United States) Real Salt Lake	Selected 20th in the 2004 MLS Expansion Draft	November 19, 2004	
FW	(United States) Michael Ritch	Retired	Contract expired	December 31, 2004	

=== MLS Draft picks ===
Draft picks are not automatically signed to the team roster. Only those who are signed to a contract will be listed as transfers in. The picks for the Columbus Crew are listed below:

2004 Columbus Crew SuperDraft Picks
Round	Pick	Player	Position	College
1	2	(United States) Chad Marshall	DF	Stanford
2	12	(United States) Chris Wingert	DF	St. John's
4	32	(United States) Jamal Sutton	FW	Southwest Missouri State
5	41	(United States) Adom Crew	MF	Brown
5	42	(United States) Luke Vercollone	MF	Seton Hall
6	52	(United States) Matthew Haefner	GK	Penn

== Awards ==
=== MLS Player of the Week ===
Week	Player	Opponent(s)	Link
11	(United States) Jeff Cunningham	Kansas City Wizards	
18	(United States) Edson Buddle	Dallas Burn	
21	(United States) Kyle Martino	D.C. United	
23	(United States) Ross Paule	Los Angeles Galaxy	
25	(United States) Edson Buddle	NY/NJ MetroStars	

=== MLS Player of the Month ===
Month	Player	Stats	Link
September	(United States) Jon Busch	4 wins, 17 saves	

=== 2004 MLS All-Star Game ===
Starters

- DF Frankie Hejduk
- DF Robin Fraser

Reserves

- GK Jon Busch

=== Postseason ===
MLS Coach of the Year

- Greg Andrulis

MLS Defender of the Year

- DF Robin Fraser

MLS Fair Play Team Award
MLS Commissioner's Award

- Lamar Hunt

MLS Best XI

- DF Robin Fraser

MLS Equipment Manager of the Year

- Tucker Walther

Group Ticket Sales Leaders

- David Zorn
- Dylan Hanlon

=== Crew Team Awards ===
- Most Valuable Player – Jon Busch
- Defensive Player of the Year – Robin Fraser
- Scoring Champion – Edson Buddle
- Man of the Year – Duncan Oughton
- Coach's Award – Simon Elliott
- Newcomer of the Year – Chad Marshall
- Goal of the Year – Edson Buddle
- Humanitarian of the Year – Nelson Akwari
- Hardest Working Man of the Year – Chris Wingert
- Comeback Player of the Year – Brian Maisonneuve
- Fan of the Year – Susie Gasbarro
