= 2004 Kansas City Wizards season =

Kansas City Wizards
2004 season
- Head coach: Bob Gansler
- Major League Soccer: West: 1st Overall: 2nd
- U.S. Open Cup: Champions
- Playoffs: Runners-up
- Top goalscorer: League: Josh Wolff (10); All: Davy Arnaud (14)
- Average home league attendance: 14,819
| Home colors | Away colors |

The 2004 Kansas City Wizards season was the ninth for the club in Major League Soccer. Kansas City completed what was their best-performing season at the time: the Wizards finished first in the Western Conference and second overall with 49 points. The club scored 38 goals and conceded 30 goals, the latter being the fewest in the 10-team season. The Wizards would eliminate defending MLS Cup champion San Jose Earthquakes over two legs in the conference semifinals, then defeat the 2002 MLS Cup winner LA Galaxy in the one-legged Western Conference final to advance to MLS Cup 2004.

In MLS Cup, Kansas City faced D.C. United, the second-place team in the East who had navigated significant mainstream media attention throughout the season due to the signing of teenage sensation Freddy Adu. The Wizards opened scoring in MLS Cup through José Burciaga Jr. in minute 6, but were done in by three successive D.C. goals (including an Alex Zotincă own goal) as United took home the Cup in a 3–2 result.

Despite this ending to the season, the Wizards did attain silverware in the 2004 calendar year. In September, the club won their first U.S. Open Cup. Kansas City beat rivals Chicago Fire 1–0 in the final, which served as a bulwark somewhat from the tough MLS Cup loss. Their seasonal performance also qualified them for the ensuing CONCACAF Champions' Cup.

== Squad ==
Note: Flags indicate national team as defined under FIFA eligibility rules; some limited exceptions apply. Players may hold more than one non-FIFA nationality.

| No. | Pos. | Nation | Player |
|---|---|---|---|
| 1 | GK | USA | Tony Meola |
| 2 | DF | SCG | Vuk Rasovic |
| 3 | DF | USA | Nick Garcia |
| 4 | DF | JAM | Shavar Thomas |
| 5 | MF | USA | Kerry Zavagnin |
| 6 | DF | USA | Jose Burciaga Jr. |
| 7 | MF | USA | Diego Gutierrez |
| 8 | MF | BRA | Diego Walsh |
| 10 | MF | USA | Francisco Gomez |
| 11 | MF | USA | Preki |
| 12 | DF | USA | Jimmy Conrad |
| 13 | FW | JAM | Wolde Harris |
| 14 | MF | USA | Jack Jewsbury |
| 15 | FW | USA | Josh Wolff |

| No. | Pos. | Nation | Player |
|---|---|---|---|
| 16 | DF | USA | Brian Roberts |
| 17 | MF | USA | Chris Klein |
| 19 | FW | USA | Matt Taylor |
| 20 | FW | RUS | Igor Simutenkov |
| 22 | FW | USA | Davy Arnaud |
| 23 | MF | ROU | Alex Zotinca |
| 24 | MF | JAM | Khari Stephenson |
| 25 | GK | USA | Bo Oshoniyi |
| 26 | DF | USA | Taylor Graham |
| 27 | FW | USA | Justin Detter |
| 30 | GK | USA | Will Hesmer |

== Competitions ==
=== Major League Soccer ===
| Overall | | | | | | | | Home | | | | | | Away | | | | | |
| Pld | W | D | L | GF | GA | GD | Pts | W | D | L | GF | GA | GD | W | D | L | GF | GA | GD |
|---|---|---|---|---|---|---|---|---|---|---|---|---|---|---|---|---|---|---|---|
| 30 | 14 | 7 | 9 | 38 | 30 | +8 | 49 | 9 | 3 | 3 | 22 | 12 | +10 | 5 | 4 | 6 | 16 | 18 | −2 |

Last updated: 2004.
Source: Major League Soccer

| Pos | Team | Pld | W | L | T | GF | GA | GD | Pts | Qualification |
|---|---|---|---|---|---|---|---|---|---|---|
| 1 | Kansas City Wizards | 30 | 14 | 9 | 7 | 38 | 30 | +8 | 49 | MLS Cup Playoffs |
| 2 | Los Angeles Galaxy | 30 | 11 | 9 | 10 | 42 | 40 | +2 | 43 | MLS Cup Playoffs |
| 3 | Colorado Rapids | 30 | 10 | 9 | 11 | 29 | 32 | −3 | 41 | MLS Cup Playoffs |
| 4 | San Jose Earthquakes | 30 | 9 | 10 | 11 | 41 | 35 | +6 | 38 | MLS Cup Playoffs |
| 5 | Dallas Burn | 30 | 10 | 14 | 6 | 34 | 45 | −11 | 36 | |

Source: MLS

| Date | Opponent | Venue | Result | Scorers | Attendance |
|---|---|---|---|---|---|
| April 3, 2004 | Chicago Fire S.C. | H | 0–0 | | |
| April 17, 2004 | Columbus Crew | H | 1–0 | Arnaud | |
| April 24, 2004 | Dallas Burn | A | 0–1 | | |
| May 1, 2004 | Colorado Rapids | H | 2–0 | Klein; Wolff | |
| May 8, 2004 | Chicago Fire S.C. | H | 2–2 | Klein; Arnaud | |
| May 15, 2004 | D.C. United | A | 0–1 | | |
| May 22, 2004 | Dallas Burn | H | 2–0 | Jewsbury; Wolff | |
| May 30, 2004 | MetroStars | A | 0–1 | | |
| June 2, 2004 | New England Revolution | H | 2–3 | Wolff; Arnaud | |
| June 5, 2004 | Los Angeles Galaxy | A | 2–1 | Gomez; Gutierrez | |
| June 9, 2004 | Colorado Rapids | A | 1–0 | Wolff | |
| June 12, 2004 | Columbus Crew | A | 2–2 | Conrad; Thomas | |
| June 19, 2004 | New England Revolution | A | 3–1 | Arnaud; Thomas 2 | |
| June 26, 2004 | San Jose Earthquakes | A | 1–1 | Burciaga Jr. | |
| July 3, 2004 | Dallas Burn | H | 5–1 | Arnaud 3 Klein; Wolff | |
| July 10, 2004 | D.C. United | H | 1–0 | Thomas | |
| July 17, 2004 | Dallas Burn | A | 1–0 | Gutierrez | |
| July 24, 2004 | Los Angeles Galaxy | H | 2–2 | Arnaud; Jewsbury | |
| July 28, 2004 | MetroStars | H | 1–2 | Klein | |
| August 14, 2004 | San Jose Earthquakes | H | 0–2 | | |
| August 18, 2004 | Columbus Crew | A | 1–2 | Graham | |
| August 21, 2004 | New England Revolution | A | 2–1 | Wolff; Arnaud | |
| September 1, 2004 | Chicago Fire S.C. | A | 1–3 | Wolff | |
| September 4, 2004 | MetroStars | H | 1–0 | Wolff | |
| September 10, 2004 | Colorado Rapids | A | 1–3 | Wolff | |
| September 18, 2004 | San Jose Earthquakes | H | 1–0 | Gutierrez | |
| September 25, 2004 | Colorado Rapids | H | 1–0 | Simutenkov | |
| October 2, 2004 | Los Angeles Galaxy | A | 1–1 | Own goal | |
| October 9, 2004 | San Jose Earthquakes | A | 0–0 | | |
| October 16, 2004 | Los Angeles Galaxy | H | 1–0 | Josh Wolff | |

=== U.S. Open Cup ===
| Date | Round | Opponents | H / A | Result F – A | Scorers | Attendance |
|---|---|---|---|---|---|---|
| July 20, 2004 | Fourth round | Atlanta Silverbacks | A | 4–1 | Arnaud 2 Gomez; Gutierrez |
| August 4, 2004 | Quarterfinals | Dallas Burn | H | 4–0 | Klein; Arnaud; Detter; Zotinca |
| August 24, 2004 | Semifinals | San Jose Earthquakes | H | 1–0 | Simutenkov |
| September 22, 2004 | Finals | Chicago Fire S.C. | H | 1–0 (ASDET) | Simutenkov |

=== MLS Cup Playoffs ===
| Date | Round | Opponents | H / A | Result F – A | Scorers | Attendance |
|---|---|---|---|---|---|---|
| October 24, 2004 | Conference Semifinals | San Jose Earthquakes | A | 0–2 |
| October 30, 2004 | Conference Semifinals | San Jose Earthquakes | H | 3–0 | Stephenson; Own goal Jewsbury |
| November 5, 2004 | Conference Finals | Los Angeles Galaxy | H | 2–0 | Arnaud 2 |
| November 14, 2004 | MLS Cup 2004 | D.C. United | N | 2–3 | Burciaga Jr. Wolff |

== Squad statistics ==
| No. | Pos. | Name | MLS | | USOC | | Playoffs | | Total | | Minutes | | Discipline | |
| No. | Pos. | Name | Apps | Goals | Apps | Goals | Apps | Goals | Apps | Goals | League | Total | Yellow card | Red card |
|---|---|---|---|---|---|---|---|---|---|---|---|---|---|---|
| 22 | FW | (United States) Davy Arnaud | 30 | 9 | 4 | 3 | 4 | 2 | 38 | 14 | 2626 | 3346 | 0 | 0 |
| 12 | DF | (United States) Jimmy Conrad | 29 | 1 | 4 | 0 | 4 | 0 | 37 | 1 | 2610 | 3335 | 0 | 0 |
| 7 | MF | (United States) Diego Gutierrez | 28 | 3 | 4 | 1 | 4 | 0 | 36 | 4 | 2520 | 3245 | 0 | 0 |
| 3 | DF | (United States) Nick Garcia | 26 | 0 | 4 | 0 | 4 | 0 | 34 | 0 | 2295 | 3020 | 0 | 0 |
| 15 | FW | (United States) Josh Wolff | 26 | 10 | 3 | 0 | 4 | 1 | 33 | 11 | 2252 | 2844 | 0 | 0 |
| 23 | MF | (Romania) Alex Zotinca | 25 | 0 | 4 | 1 | 4 | 0 | 33 | 1 | 1779 | 2365 | 0 | 0 |
| 5 | MF | (United States) Kerry Zavagnin | 24 | 0 | 4 | 0 | 4 | 0 | 32 | 0 | 2160 | 2881 | 0 | 0 |
| 6 | DF | (United States) Jose Burciaga Jr. | 24 | 1 | 4 | 0 | 4 | 1 | 32 | 2 | 1876 | 2601 | 0 | 0 |
| 14 | MF | (United States) Jack Jewsbury | 22 | 2 | 3 | 0 | 4 | 1 | 29 | 3 | 1406 | 1860 | 0 | 0 |
| 4 | DF | (Jamaica) Shavar Thomas | 25 | 1 | 1 | 0 | 0 | 0 | 26 | 1 | 1880 | 1970 | 0 | 0 |
| 10 | MF | (United States) Francisco Gomez | 23 | 1 | 3 | 1 | 0 | 0 | 26 | 2 | 1097 | 1262 | 0 | 0 |
| 1 | GK | (United States) Tony Meola | 21 | 0 | 3 | 0 | 0 | 0 | 24 | 0 | 1890 | 2146 | 0 | 0 |
| 26 | DF | (United States) Taylor Graham | 17 | 1 | 3 | 0 | 2 | 0 | 22 | 1 | 750 | 944 | 0 | 0 |
| 17 | MF | (United States) Chris Klein | 19 | 5 | 2 | 1 | 0 | 0 | 21 | 6 | 1694 | 1874 | 0 | 0 |
| 19 | FW | (United States) Matt Taylor | 17 | 3 | 1 | 0 | 1 | 0 | 19 | 3 | 524 | 562 | 0 | 0 |
| 8 | MF | (Brazil) Diego Walsh | 15 | 0 | 0 | 0 | 3 | 0 | 18 | 0 | 688 | 711 | 0 | 0 |
| 25 | GK | (United States) Bo Oshoniyi | 9 | 0 | 2 | 0 | 4 | 0 | 15 | 0 | 810 | 1279 | 0 | 0 |
| 20 | FW | (Russia) Igor Simutenkov | 9 | 1 | 2 | 2 | 3 | 0 | 14 | 3 | 456 | 669 | 0 | 0 |
| 24 | MF | (Jamaica) Khari Stephenson | 3 | 0 | 3 | 0 | 4 | 1 | 9 | 1 | 44 | 270 | 0 | 0 |
| 27 | FW | (United States) Justin Detter | 6 | 0 | 3 | 1 | 0 | 0 | 9 | 1 | 162 | 275 | 0 | 0 |
| 11 | FW | (United States) Preki | 2 | 0 | 1 | 0 | 0 | 0 | 3 | 0 | 90 | 125 | 0 | 0 |
| 2 | DF | (Serbia and Montenegro) Vuk Rasovic | 1 | 0 | 0 | 0 | 0 | 0 | 1 | 0 | 45 | 45 | 0 | 0 |

Final Statistics
