= Clanton =

Clanton can refer to different things:

== People ==
- Crystal Clanton American lawyer
- Cydney Clanton (born 1989), American professional golfer
- David A. Clanton (born 1944), chair of the Federal Trade Commission
- Denny Clanton (born 1982), American soccer (football) player
- George Clanton, American electronic musician
- Ike Clanton (1847–1887), and Billy Clanton (1862–1881), who were involved in the Gunfight at the O.K. Corral
- James Holt Clanton (1827–1871), Confederate general during the American Civil War
- J. Caleb Clanton (born 1978), Professor of Philosophy at Lipscomb University
- Luke Clanton (born 2003), American amateur golfer

== Places ==
- Clanton, Alabama, a town in the United States
- Clanton, Mississippi, a fictional town in the United States and the setting for several books by John Grisham
