= Matt Pickens =

American retired soccer player (born 1982)

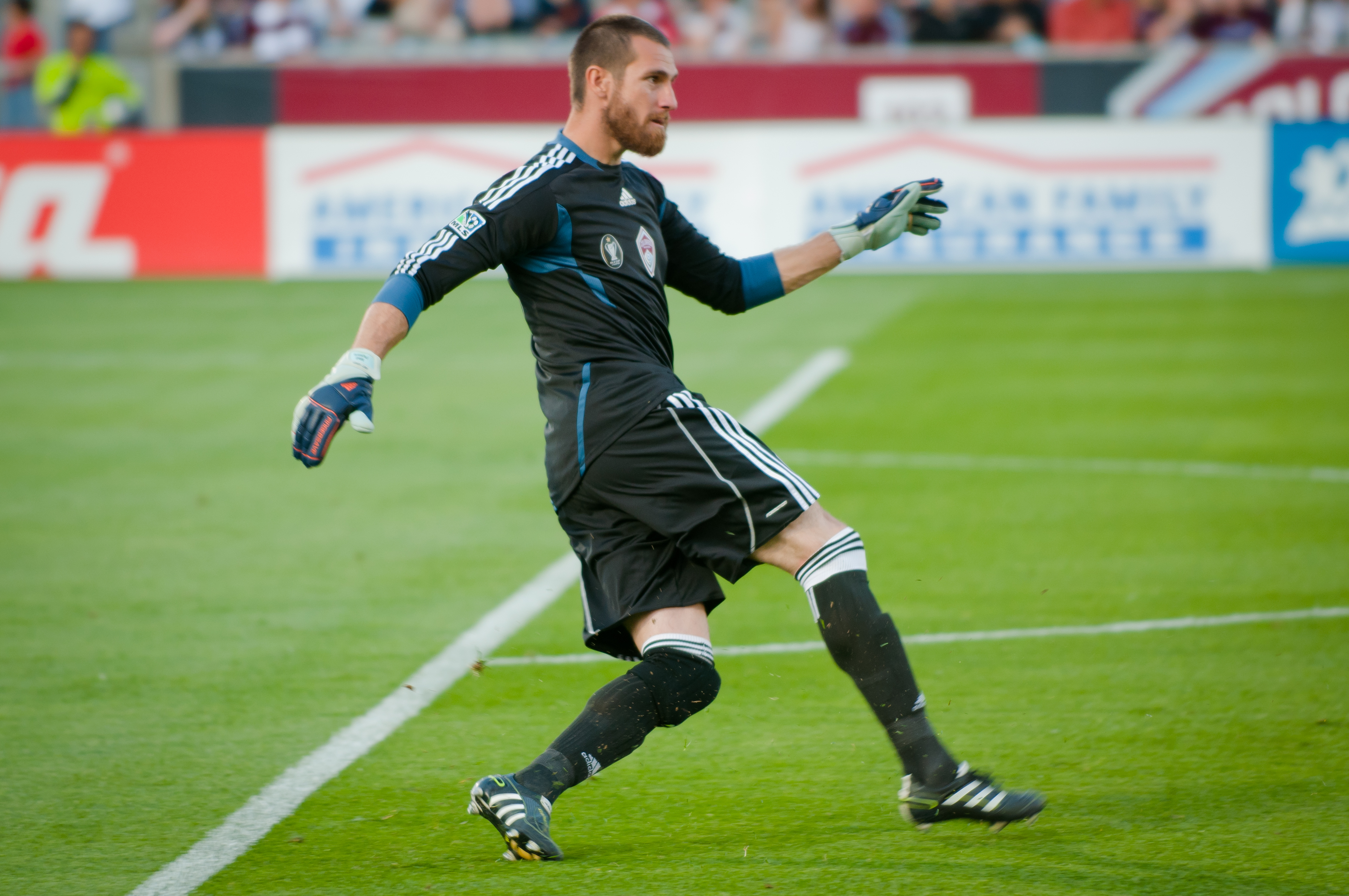
- Pickens with the Colorado Rapids in 2011

Personal information
- Full name: Matthew Pickens
- Date of birth: April 5, 1982 (age 44)
- Place of birth: Washington, Missouri, United States
- Height: 6 ft 3 in (1.91 m)
- Position: Goalkeeper

College career
Years	Team	Apps	(Gls)
2000–2003	Missouri State Bears		

Senior career*
Years	Team	Apps	(Gls)
2002–2003	Chicago Fire Premier		
2004–2007	Chicago Fire	40	(0)
2004	→ Mariners (loan)	3	(0)
2008	Queens Park Rangers	0	(0)
2009–2014	Colorado Rapids	116	(0)
2014	New England Revolution	0	(0)
2014–2017	Tampa Bay Rowdies	107	(0)
2018–2019	Nashville SC	56	(0)
Total		322	(0)

Managerial career
- 2020–2024: Nashville SC (goalkeeping)
- 2026–: Houston Dash (asst./goalkeeping)
- * Club domestic league appearances and goals as of October 23, 2019

Matt Pickens (born April 5, 1982) is an American retired soccer player who is an assistant coach and goalkeeping coach for the Houston Dash of the National Women's Soccer League (NWSL).

== Career ==
=== Youth and amateur ===
Pickens initially attended Meramec Community College before playing college soccer for Missouri State University from 2000 to 2003. He also played for Chicago Fire Premier in the USL Premier Development League.

=== Professional ===
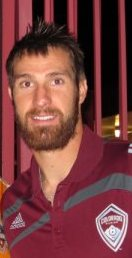
Matt Pickens after a match at Houston Dynamo 2010

Upon graduating, Pickens was drafted 19th overall in the 2004 MLS SuperDraft by the Fire. He was not able, however, to break through a deep lineup of Fire goalkeepers, which initially included Henry Ring and D.J. Countess, and later Zach Thornton. He was loaned out for much of the year to the A-League Virginia Beach Mariners, where he played 290 minutes, conceding only 3 goals.

During the latter half of 2006, after an injury to Zach Thornton, Pickens started in goal for the Fire even once Thornton was match fit again. Pickens won the 2006 Open Cup as the starter for Chicago Fire. Also in 2006, was his first MLS play-off start on October 22, 2006, for the Fire, keeping a clean sheet in a game that the Fire won, 1-0 thanks to a goal from Justin Mapp in the 35th minute. Zach Thornton was traded to the Colorado Rapids before the 2007 season, clearing the way for Pickens to start.

In February 2008, Pickens signed a deal with Queens Park Rangers until the end of the 2008 season.

In May 2008, it was announced that Pickens would not have his contract extended and that he would be released by the club at the end of June.

Pickens trained/trailed with numerous clubs in England and Scotland after his release, including Hibernian, Doncaster Rovers, Falkirk and Nottingham Forest, the latter of which he claims he was close to signing with. However, despite not securing a new contract in Europe, Chicago Fire traded Pickens rights to Colorado Rapids on January 15, 2009 and was signed by the club shortly after.

Pickens helped the Rapids to playoff appearances in 2010 and 2011. In 2010 the Rapids and Pickens won their first MLS Cup, beating FC Dallas 2–1 in extra time. Early in the 2013 season, Pickens suffered a broken arm in a match against Real Salt Lake making this his last appearance with the Rapids.

Pickens was released early in the 2014 season.

After Pickens was released by Colorado Rapids in early 2014 New England Revolution acquired him in the waiver draft.

Soon after signing with New England, Pickens was sold to Tampa Bay Rowdies in the North American Soccer League.

On November 30, 2017 Nashville SC announced Pickens as the club's first signing ahead of their inaugural 2018 season in United Soccer League.

Nashville S.C. earned back to back playoff appearances in 2018 and 2019. Pickens was the USL Championship Goalkeeper of the year in 2019. Also in 2019, Pickens broke the 100 professional shutouts milestone in his career.

Other accomplishments for Pickens was being named MLS Player of the Month for September 2006 and October 2007, proving his ability to compete under pressure getting his team into the playoffs both years late in the MLS season.

== International ==
As of December 2010, Pickens has been called up to five United States training camps, including the camp in January 2011. However, he has never earned a national cap or been part of the final 18-man roster.

== Coaching ==
In January 2020, Pickens was announced as the first goalkeeping coach for Major League Soccer's Nashville SC. Pickens departed Nashville in October 2024.

In February 2026, Pickens was announced as an assistant coach and goalkeeper coach for the Houston Dash of the National Women's Soccer League (NWSL).

== Honors ==
=== Chicago Fire ===
- U.S. Open Cup Champion: 2006

=== Colorado Rapids ===
- Major League Soccer Eastern Conference Championship: 2010
- Major League Soccer MLS Cup Champion: 2010

=== Nashville SC ===
- 2019 USL Championship Goalkeeper of the Year
