= Jeff Stewart (soccer) =

American soccer player

Personal information
- Date of birth: June 21, 1980 (age 46)
- Place of birth: Bellevue, Washington
- Position: Defender

College career
| Years | Team | Apps | (Gls) |
| 1998–2001 | Santa Clara | | |

Senior career*
| Years | Team | Apps | (Gls) |
| 2002–2003 | Colorado Rapids | 32 | (0) |
- * Club domestic league appearances and goals

Jeff Stewart (born June 21, 1980) is an American soccer defender who last played for Colorado Rapids of Major League Soccer.

Stewart played college soccer at Santa Clara University from 1998 to 2001. As a junior, he was named the West Coast Conference Defender of the Year; he finished his career at Santa Clara with six goals and one assist in 81 games, 65 of them starts.

Upon graduating, Stewart was selected 19th overall in the 2002 MLS SuperDraft by Rapids. Stewart immediately earned a starting place, appearing in 23 games for the Rapids as a rookie, and adding three assists. Stewart started seven of eight games for the team in 2003, before suffering a serious knee injury that kept him out the rest of the season. Unfortunately, Stewart would suffer injury problems throughout the 2004 season as well and, combined with new competition from Nat Borchers, he did not see any playing time.

Stewart was selected 19th overall in the 2004 MLS Expansion Draft by Chivas USA. Five days later he was traded to Real Salt Lake for a permanent international roster slot. However, Stewart was not able to come back from the injuries and was placed on the season-ending injured reserve.
