= Kevin Ara =

American soccer player

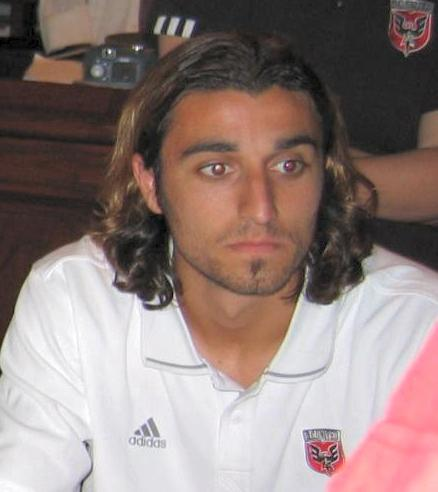

Personal information
- Full name: Kevin Ara
- Date of birth: February 8, 1984 (age 42)
- Place of birth: Upland, California, U.S.
- Height: 6 ft 2 in (1.88 m)
- Position: Midfielder

Youth career
- Years: Team
- 2000–2003: Harvard
2004	D.C. United	12	(0)

Kevin Ara (born February 8, 1984) is an American soccer player, who played midfielder for D.C. United.

Ara played college soccer at Harvard University, he was named first team All-Ivy, first team All-New England and an NCAA All-American. Ara finished his junior year with second most points in all of college soccer and a finalist for the Hermann Trophy during his senior season.

After graduating from Harvard, Ara was selected 24th overall in the 2004 MLS SuperDraft. Ara earned significant playing time during his 2004 rookie season while winning a championship with D.C. United.

Ara was selected 18th overall by Real Salt Lake in the 2004 MLS expansion draft.

After retiring from professional soccer, Ara started a career in finance.
