= Pablo Brenes =

Costa Rican footballer (born 1982)

Personal information
- Full name: Pablo Andrés Brenes Quesada
- Date of birth: 4 August 1982 (age 44)
- Place of birth: Costa Rica
- Height: 1.73 m (5 ft 8 in)
- Positions: Attacking midfielder; left winger

Senior career*
Years	Team	Apps	(Gls)
2001–2003	Pérez Zeledón	33	(4)
2004	MetroStars	14	(0)
2005	Saprissa	10	(0)
2005	Real Salt Lake	0	(0)
2006–2008	Saprissa	78	(3)
2008–2010	Brujas	62	(12)
2011–2013	Cartaginés	70	(20)
2013	Santos de Guápiles	7	(0)

International career
2005–2009	Costa Rica	11	(0)
- * Club domestic league appearances and goals

Pablo Andrés Brenes Quesada (born 4 August 1982) is a Costa Rican soccer player.

== Club career ==
Brenes' first team in Major League Soccer (MLS) was the MetroStars, whom he joined from Pérez Zeledón in Costa Rica, signing with the team on June 4, 2004. He finished the year with no goals or assists in 14 games. Brenes was then taken by Real Salt Lake in the 2004 MLS Expansion Draft, but never played a game with the team. He was traded to Saprissa for Douglas Sequeira (who was then sent to Chivas USA).

With Saprissa, he has won a national championship and a CONCACAF Champions Cup, and was part of the team that played the 2005 FIFA Club World Championship, where Saprissa finished third behind São Paulo and Liverpool. In 2008, he joined Brujas.

In summer 2011, Brenes signed a three short tournament and debuted in the tie against Alajuelense, scoring the team's goal. He was released by Cartaginés in May 2013.

He was later released by his new club Santos de Guápiles in November 2013.

== International career ==
Brenes was a fixture for the Under-23 Costa Rica national football team, and played a major role in the team's run in the 2004 Summer Olympics, impressing many observers.

He made his senior debut for Costa Rica in a June 2005 friendly match against China and has earned a total of 11 caps, scoring no goals. He has represented his country in 3 FIFA World Cup qualification matches and played at the 2009 UNCAF Nations Cup as well as at the 2009 CONCACAF Gold Cup where he played his final international in July 2009 against Mexico.

== Career statistics ==
=== Club ===
Season	Club	Division	League		Cup		Concachampions		Total	
Season	Club	Division	Apps	Goals	Apps	Goals	Apps	Goals	Apps	Goals
2010–11	Cartaginés	Primera División	13	4	-	-	-	-	13	4
2011–12	Cartaginés	Primera División	35	12	-	-	-	-	35	12
2012–13	Cartaginés	Primera División	19	3	-	-	-	-	19	3
Career Total			67	19	-	-	-	-	67	19

=== International ===
Appearances and goals by national team and year
National team	Year	Apps	Goals
Costa Rica	2005	2	0
Costa Rica	2006	–	
Costa Rica	2007	–	
Costa Rica	2008	1	0
Costa Rica	2009	8	0
Total		11	0
