= Michael Wilson (New Zealand footballer) =

New Zealand footballer (born 1980)

Mike Wilson
Personal information
- Full name: Michael David Wilson
- Date of birth: 25 November 1980 (age 45)
- Place of birth: Plimmerton, New Zealand
- Height: 1.80 m (5 ft 11 in)
- Position: Defender

Youth career
- 2000–2003: Stanford Cardinal

Senior career*
Years	Team	Apps	(Gls)
2004–2006	Minnesota Thunder	47	(1)
2007–2008	Western Suburbs FC		
2009–2010	Aucas	5	(0)

International career
1997	New Zealand U17		
2003–2006	New Zealand	7	(0)
- * Club domestic league appearances and goals

Michael David Wilson (born 25 November 1980) is a New Zealand retired soccer player who played as a midfielder. He played college soccer at Stanford University and represented New Zealand at the international level.

== International career ==
Wilson played for New Zealand U-17 at the 1997 FIFA U-17 World Championship in Egypt, appearing in two matches at the finals.

In 2000, Wilson moved to the United States, where he played college soccer for Stanford. Nicknamed, "Sydney," the New Zealander played on teams that won a Pac-10 championship (2001), as well as making two college cups. After graduating, Wilson was selected in the 2004 MLS SuperDraft by the San Jose Earthquakes.

He made his full All Whites debut as a substitute in a 3–0 loss to Iran on 12 October 2003 and made a total of seven A-international appearances, his final cap an appearance in a 1–1 draw with Estonia on 31 May 2006.

Although he was included in the New Zealand side for the 2003 Confederations Cup finals tournament in France, Wilson did not make an appearance at the tournament.
