= D. J. Countess =

American soccer player

Personal information
- Full name: Delvin Christopher Countess
- Date of birth: January 9, 1982 (age 44)
- Place of birth: Sacramento, California, United States
- Height: 6 ft 1 in (1.85 m)
- Position: Goalkeeper

College career
Years	Team	Apps	(Gls)
2000	UCLA Bruins		

Senior career*
Years	Team	Apps	(Gls)
2001	MetroStars	0	(0)
2001–2003	Dallas Burn	25	(0)
2004	Chicago Fire	2	(0)
2005	Real Salt Lake	27	(0)
2006	Östers IF	3	(0)
2007	Provincial Osorno	15	(0)
2007	Tigre	0	(0)
- * Club domestic league appearances and goals as of 16 October 2007 ‡ National team caps and goals as of 5 Jan 2007

Delvin Christopher "D.J." Countess (born January 9, 1982, in Sacramento, California) is an American former professional soccer goalkeeper.

He graduated from Bella Vista High School in Fair Oaks, California.

== Club career ==
Countess attended University of California, Los Angeles, where he had a 1.02 goals against average, good for a second in the Pacific-10 Conference his freshman season.

Upon completing his freshman year, he joined the Major League Soccer (MLS) Project-40 program. On August 3, 2001, he acquired by the MetroStars through a weighted lottery. During his first year he served as a backup to Tim Howard. Countess was traded to the Dallas Burn on March 13, 2002, prior to the start of the 2002 season. However, shortly after an impressive debut match, he suffered a shoulder injury and was forced to miss the remainder of the season. He bounced back in 2003, starting in twenty-four league matches and was named the clubs Defender of the Year after tallying 115 saves. He also tied an MLS record that season by facing a total of ten penalty kicks; and he set the league record by saving four, including two in a single game which was also another league record. In 2004, he was traded to Chicago Fire, where he spent the 2004 season as the primary backup to Henry Ring. Countess made only two first team appearances. Real Salt Lake, then coached by Countess' youth coach, John Ellinger, took Countess as a second draft pick in the 2004 MLS Expansion Draft. Countess started in twenty-seven matches for the expansion team but his option was not picked up following the season.

Though several MLS clubs expressed interest in acquiring him in early 2006, Countess opted not to return to MLS and to instead pursue a career in Europe. In mid-2006 he had trials with French clubs AJ Auxerre and FC Metz, and Swedish club Östers IF. All three teams expressed interest but it was Östers IF who then played in Sweden's top division the Allsvenskan that signed Countess to a contract until the end of the 2006 season. Up to October 2006, he had started in three matches for the club. In early 2007, he signed for Provincial Osorno, in the Chilean second division, Liga Chilena de Fútbol: Primera B. After helping them win promotion to the Primera División, in July 2007 he moved to Argentina to play for newly promoted Atlético Tigre in the Argentine Primera División. Countess sustained a wrist injury early in the 2008 season with Tigre, he underwent surgery in April 2008.

== International career ==
Countess has played at various levels for the United States national team playing a total of seventy-two games for the U-17's, U-20's and U-23's. He was in goal for the U.S. when they finished fourth at the 1999 FIFA U-17 World Championship in New Zealand, and in the 2001 U-20 FIFA World Youth Championship in Argentina. In 2004, he played in the US U-23 Olympic team that failed to qualify for the 2004 Summer Olympics.

== Dream Keeper Foundation ==
Countess has been involved in humanitarian work throughout his career. While playing for Real Salt Lake he established the Dream Keeper Foundation, a non-profit organization dedicated to providing funding for Utah children in need of medical care.
