= 2004 MLS SuperDraft =

College draft for soccer teams

General information
- Sport: Soccer
- Date: January 16, 2004
- Time: 10:00 am (EST)
- Location: Charlotte, North Carolina
- Network: Fox Sports World

Overview
- 60 total selections
- First selection: Freddy Adu, D.C. United
- Most selections: Chicago Fire (10 selections)
- Fewest selections: D.C. United; New England Revolution (4 selections)

The 2004 MLS SuperDraft, held in Charlotte, North Carolina on January 16, 2004, was the fifth incarnation of the annual Major League Soccer SuperDraft. The draft was most notable at the time for the selection of one of the youngest athletes in American sporting history, Freddy Adu, with the first pick by D.C. United after a trade from the Dallas Burn. The trade was initiated by the league after Adu had signed in November 2003 with the intent of playing for D.C., his local team.

The draft also included Clint Dempsey (1st round), who later won MLS Rookie of the Year, and teenager Michael Bradley (4th round), the son of MetroStars coach Bob Bradley. Both players went on to earn over 120 caps with the U.S. national team and play overseas for European teams before returning to MLS.

== Player selection ==
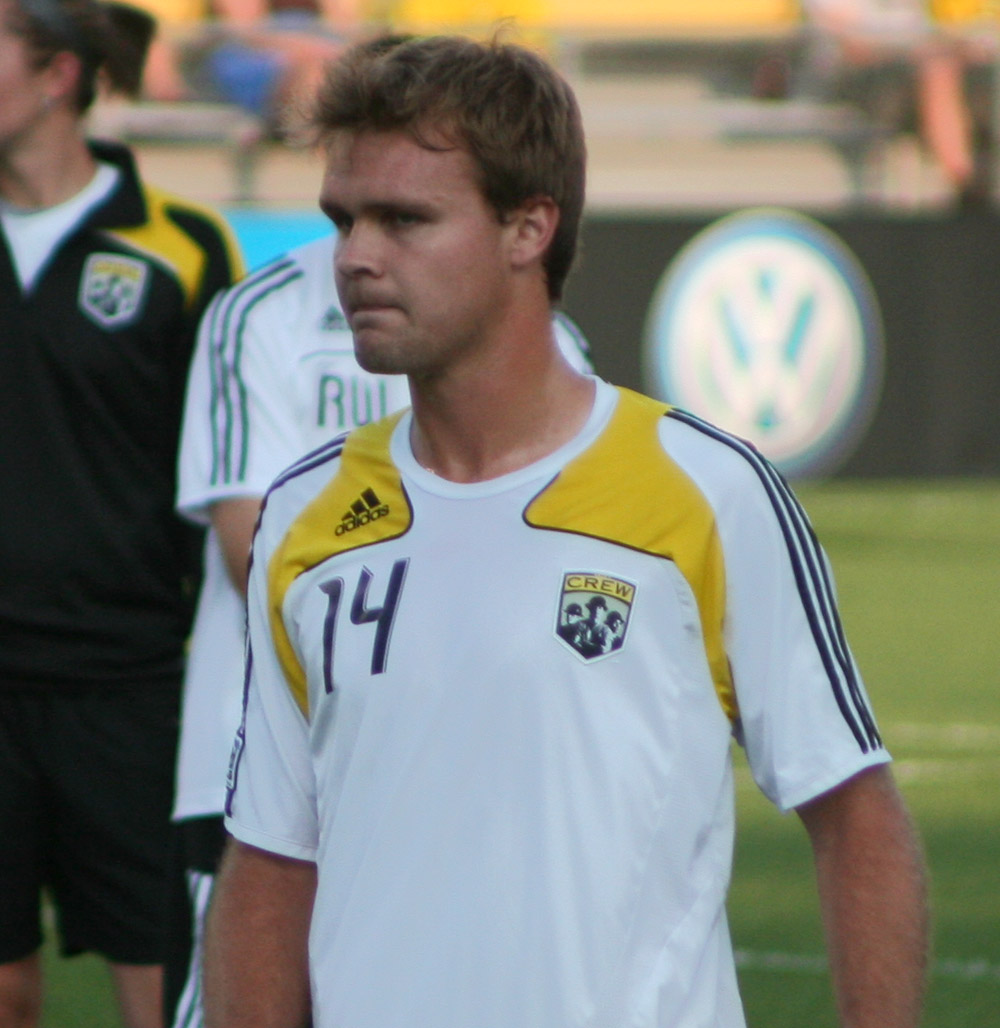
Columbus selected Chad Marshall 2nd overall. He is a 3x MLS Defender of the Year and 4x MLS Best XI selection. He earned 12 caps with the US Men's National Team.

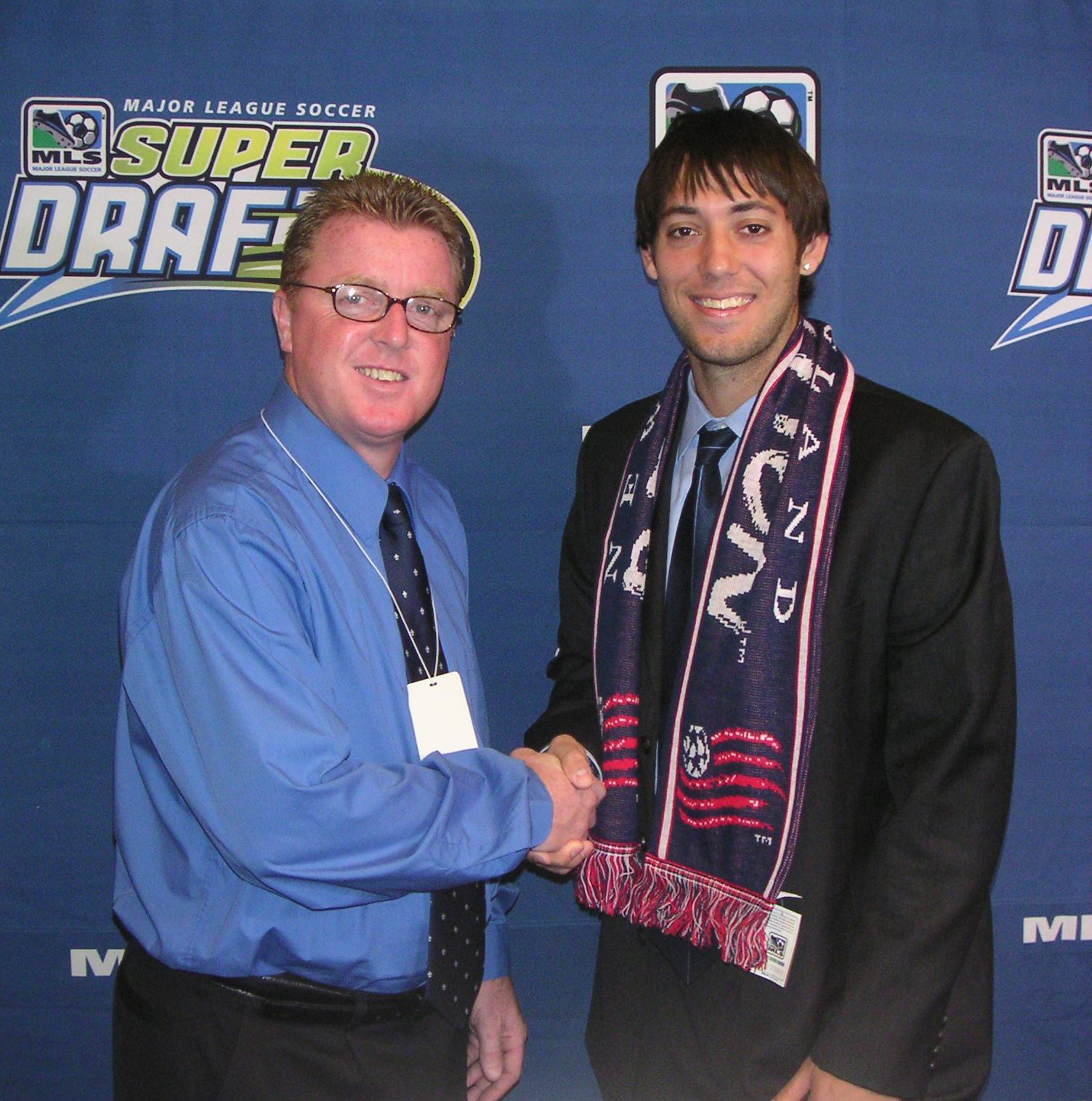
New England selected Clint Dempsey 8th overall. The 2004 MLS Rookie of the Year is a 4x MLS All-Star, 3x U.S. Soccer Player of the Year, and the 2017 MLS Comeback Player of the Year. He earned 141 caps with he US Men's National Team, representing the United States at the 2006, 2010, and 2014 FIFA World Cup. With 57 goals, he and Landon Donovan are tied for most goals for the USMNT. He was elected to the National Soccer Hall of Fame in 2022.

Key

*	Denotes a player contracted under the Project-40 program
^	Denotes player who has been selected to an MLS All-Star Game
§	Denotes a player who won the MLS Rookie of the Year
†	Denotes player who has been selected for an MLS Best XI team
~	Denotes a player who won the MLS MVP

=== Round one ===
Pick #	MLS Team	Player	Position	Affiliation
1	D.C. United (Note: #1: Dallas Burn → D.C. United. November 18, 2003: D.C. United acquired this pick from Dallas in exchange for an allocation. The trade was engineered by Major League Soccer to ensure that top draft pick Freddy Adu could play for his hometown club.)	(United States) Freddy Adu*^	F	Project-40
2	Columbus Crew	(United States) Chad Marshall*†	D	Stanford University
3	Los Angeles Galaxy	(Zimbabwe) Joseph Ngwenya	F	Coastal Carolina University
4	Kansas City Wizards (Note: #4: D.C. United → Dallas Burn → Kansas City Wizards. January 16, 2004: Kansas City acquired this pick, defender Shavar Thomas, and a conditional second round selection in the 2005 MLS SuperDraft from Dallas in exchange for the #7 pick, midfielder Eric Quill, and midfielder Carey Talley. Dallas had acquired this pick, a sixth-round 2004 SuperDraft pick, and forward Ali Curtis from D.C. United in exchange for forward Ronald Cerritos on August 19, 2003.)	(United States) Matt Taylor	F	UCLA
5	San Jose Earthquakes (Note: #5: Colorado Rapids → San Jose Earthquakes. August 19, 2003: San Jose acquired this pick, a third-round selection in the 2005 MLS SuperDraft, and a fourth-round selection in the 2005 SuperDraft from Colorado in exchange for goalkeeper Joe Cannon.)	(United States) Ryan Cochrane*	D	Santa Clara University
6	Dallas Burn (Note: #6: MetroStars → Los Angeles Galaxy → Dallas Burn. July 11, 2003: Dallas acquired this pick, defender Ezra Hendrickson and forward Gavin Glinton from Los Angeles in exchange for defender Ryan Suarez, midfielder Paul Broome, midfielder Antonio Martínez, and the #11 pick (originally a conditional selection). Los Angeles had acquired this pick from MetroStars in exchange for a second-round selection in the 2003 MLS SuperDraft on January 17, 2003.)	(Honduras) Ramón Núñez	M	SMU
7	Dallas Burn (Note: #7: Kansas City Wizards → Dallas Burn.January 16, 2004: Dallas acquired this pick, midfielder Eric Quill, and midfielder Carey Talley from Kansas City in exchange for the #4 pick, defender Shavar Thomas, and a conditional second-round selection in the 2005 MLS SuperDraft.)	(United States) Clarence Goodson*	D	University of Maryland
8	New England Revolution	(United States) Clint Dempsey*^§†	M	Furman University
9	Chicago Fire (Note: #9: Chicago Fire → New England Revolution → Chicago Fire. January 16, 2004: Chicago re-acquired this pick from New England in exchange for a player allocation due to the retirement of midfielder Peter Nowak. Earlier in the day, New England had acquired this selection from Chicago to complete the transaction that sent Nowak from Chicago to New England on January 3, 2003. Chicago also received the #18 pick in the 2004 SuperDraft from New England to complete the trade.)	(United States) Scott Buete	M	University of Maryland
10	San Jose Earthquakes	(United States) Steve Cronin*	GK	Santa Clara University

=== Round two ===
Pick #	MLS Team	Player	Position	Affiliation
11	Chicago Fire (Note: #11: Dallas Burn → Los Angeles Galaxy → MetroStars → Chicago Fire. January 14, 2004: Chicago acquired this pick, originally a conditional selection, from MetroStars to complete the trade for coach Bob Bradley. Chicago had previously acquired forward Rodrigo Faria as compensation for MetroStars hiring Bradley on October 22, 2002. MetroStars had acquired this pick from Los Angeles in exchange for a first-round selection in the 2005 MLS SuperDraft and future considerations earlier on January 16, 2004. Los Angeles had acquired this pick, defender Ryan Suarez, midfielder Paul Broome, and midfielder Antonio Martínez from Dallas in exchange for the #6 pick, defender Ezra Hendrickson and forward Gavin Glinton on July 11, 2003.)	(United States) Leonard Griffin	D	UCLA
12	Columbus Crew	(United States) Chris Wingert	D	St. John's University
13	Los Angeles Galaxy	(United States) Josh Gardner*	M	University of Cincinnati
14	Los Angeles Galaxy (Note: #14: D.C. United → Chicago Fire → Los Angeles Galaxy. January 16, 2004: Los Angeles acquired this pick from Chicago in exchange for the lowest of LA's three first-round selections in the 2005 MLS SuperDraft. Chicago had acquired this pick from D.C. United in exchange for forward Hristo Stoitchkov on January 27, 2003. (Note: "Bulgarian connection". SI.com. January 28, 2003.))	(United States) Ned Grabavoy*	M	Indiana University
15	Colorado Rapids	(United States) Adolfo Gregorio	M	UCLA
16	Colorado Rapids (Note: #16: MetroStars → Columbus Crew → Colorado Rapids. January 14, 2004: Colorado acquired this pick and a conditional selection in the 2005 MLS SuperDraft from Columbus in exchange for defender Robin Fraser. Columbus had acquired this pick and defender Nelson Akwari from MetroStars in exchange for the #17 pick in the 2003 MLS SuperDraft on January 17, 2003.)	(Canada) Adrian Cann	D	University of Louisville
17	Kansas City Wizards	(United States) Will Hesmer	GK	Wake Forest University
18	MetroStars (Note: #18: New England Revolution → Chicago Fire → MetroStars. January 16, 2004: MetroStars acquired this pick from Chicago in exchange for a natural second-round selection in the 2005 MLS SuperDraft. Earlier in the day, Chicago had acquired this pick from New England in exchange for the #9 pick to complete the transaction that sent midfielder Peter Nowak from Chicago to New England on January 3, 2003.)	(United States) Seth Stammler	D	University of Maryland
19	Chicago Fire	(United States) Matt Pickens	GK	SMS (now Missouri State)
20	Chicago Fire (Note: #20: San Jose Earthquakes → Chicago Fire. August 20, 2003: Chicago acquired this pick, originally a conditional selection, from San Jose in exchange for forward Rodrigo Faria.)	(Ghana) Sumed Ibrahim	M	University of Maryland

=== Round three ===
Pick #	MLS Team	Player	Position	Affiliation
21	MetroStars (Note: #21: Dallas Burn → MetroStars. December 3, 2003: MetroStars acquired this pick and defender Tenywa Bonseu from Dallas in exchange for defender Steve Jolley.)	(United States) Zach Wells	GK	UCLA
22	Los Angeles Galaxy (Note: #22: Columbus Crew → Los Angeles Galaxy. July 31, 2003: Los Angeles acquired this pick, originally a conditional selection, from Columbus in exchange for forward Alex Pineda Chacon.)	(United States) Memo Arzate	M	UC Santa Barbara
23	New England Revolution (Note: #23: Los Angeles Galaxy → New England Revolution. August 8, 2003: New England acquired this pick (originally a conditional selection) and a conditional 2005 MLS SuperDraft pick from Los Angeles in exchange for the rights to forward Diego Serna. The 2005 pick was contingent on Serna remaining with Los Angeles in 2004. This condition was not met so LA kept its 2005 pick.)	(United States) Jeremiah White	F	Wake Forest University
24	D.C. United (Note: #24: D.C. United → Kansas City Wizards → D.C. United. January 16, 2004: D.C. United re-acquired this pick from Kansas City in exchange for D.C. United's natural second-round and third-round selections in the 2005 MLS SuperDraft. On July 29, 2002, Kansas City had acquired this selection and a second-round pick in the 2003 MLS SuperDraft from D.C. United in exchange for a Discovery Pick.)	(United States) Kevin Ara	M	Harvard University
25	Colorado Rapids (Note: #25: Colorado Rapids → Columbus Crew → Colorado Rapids. January 16, 2004: Colorado re-acquired this pick from Columbus in exchange for the rights to defender Steven Herdsman and the conditional pick in the 2005 MLS SuperDraft that was traded to Columbus in the Robin Fraser trade two days earlier (see pick #16 above). Columbus had acquired this pick and the #58 pick in the 2003 MLS SuperDraft from Colorado in exchange for the #27 pick in the 2003 SuperDraft on January 17, 2003.)	(United States) Kevin Taylor	D	University of Michigan
26	MetroStars	(Canada) Olivier Occéan	F	So. Connecticut State University
27	San Jose Earthquakes (Note: #27: Kansas City Wizards → San Jose Earthquakes. January 17, 2003: San Jose acquired this pick, originally a conditional selection, and a second-round selection in the 2003 MLS SuperDraft from Kansas City in exchange for defender Jimmy Conrad.)	(New Zealand) Mike Wilson	M	Stanford University
28	Chicago Fire (Note: #28: New England Revolution → Chicago Fire. January 3, 2003: It is believed, though not confirmed, that this is the conditional pick received by Chicago from New England in exchange for midfielder Peter Nowak.)	(Jamaica) Khari Stephenson	M	Williams College
29	Dallas Burn (Note: #29: Chicago Fire → Dallas Burn. January 17, 2003: Dallas acquired this pick from Chicago in exchange for the #35 pick in the 2003 MLS SuperDraft.)	(United States) Ty Maurin	M	UCLA
30	San Jose Earthquakes	(United States) Lindon Pecorelli	M	University of Connecticut

=== Round four ===
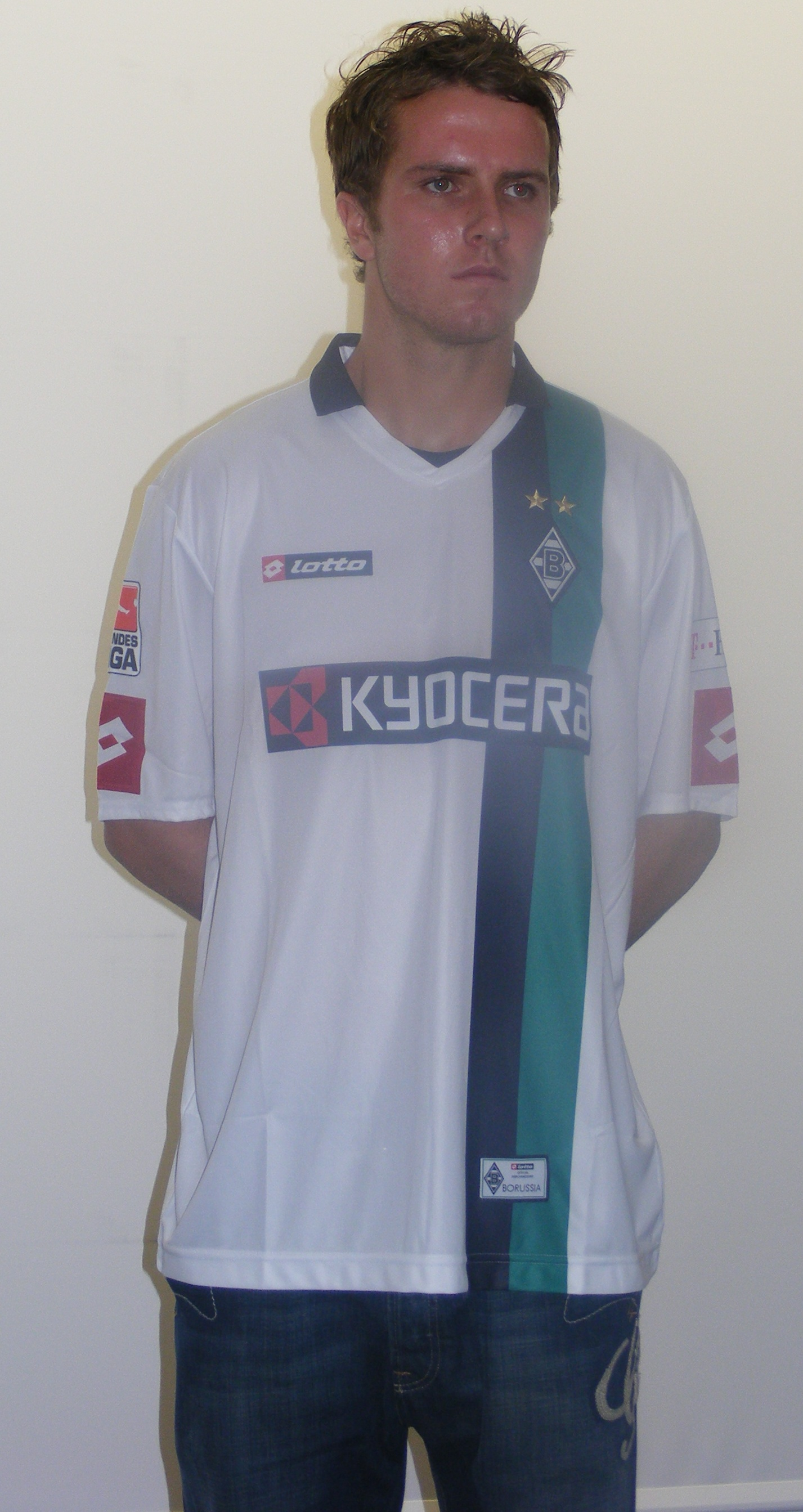
The MetroStars selected Michael Bradley 36th overall. the 3x MLS All-Star, was named the 2015 U.S. Soccer Player of the Year. He's earned 151 caps with the US Men's National Team and was selected to the 2010, and 2014 FIFA World Cup squads.

Pick #	MLS Team	Player	Position	Affiliation
31	Dallas Burn	(United States) David Wagenfuhr	D	Creighton University
32	Columbus Crew	(United States) Jamal Sutton	F	SMS (now Missouri State)
33	Los Angeles Galaxy	(Republic of Ireland) David McGill	M	UC Santa Barbara
34	D.C. United	(United States) Josh Gros^	M	Rutgers University
35	Colorado Rapids	(Bermuda) Kevin Richards	D	University of Notre Dame
36	MetroStars	(United States) Michael Bradley*^	M	Project-40
37	Kansas City Wizards	(United States) Jay Alberts	M	Yale University
38	Chicago Fire (Note: #38: New England Revolution → Chicago Fire. April 11, 2003: Chicago acquired this pick from New England in exchange for the rights to midfielder Jason Moore.)	(United States) Denny Clanton	D	University of Dayton
39	Chicago Fire	(United States) Phil Hucles	D	The College of William & Mary
40	San Jose Earthquakes	(Croatia) Marin Pusek	M	UAB

=== Round five ===
Pick #	MLS Team	Player	Position	Affiliation
41	Columbus Crew (Note: #41: Dallas Burn → Columbus Crew. Must Confirm. August 20, 2003: Columbus acquired this pick, originally a conditional selection, from Dallas in exchange for defender Brian Dunseth.)	(United States) Adom Crew	M	Brown University
42	Columbus Crew	(United States) Luke Vercollone	M	Seton Hall University
43	Los Angeles Galaxy	(United States) Jason Perry	D	Oakland University
44	D.C. United	(United States) Kevin Hudson	M	SMU
45	Colorado Rapids	(United States) Gary Sullivan	D	Adelphi University
46	MetroStars	(United States) Johnny David	M	Fairleigh Dickinson University
47	Kansas City Wizards	(United States) Justin Detter	F	University of Notre Dame
48	Kansas City Wizards (Note: #48: New England Revolution → Kansas City Wizards. August 20, 2003: Kansas City acquired this pick (originally a conditional selection), forward Chris Brown, and forward Darío Fabbro from New England in exchange for forward Wolde Harris and midfielder Jorge Vázquez.)	(United States) Ryan Barber	D	UMKC
49	Chicago Fire	(United States) Ian Pilarski	M	Cornell University
50	San Jose Earthquakes	(United States) Tighe Dombrowski	M	UW-Milwaukee

=== Round six ===
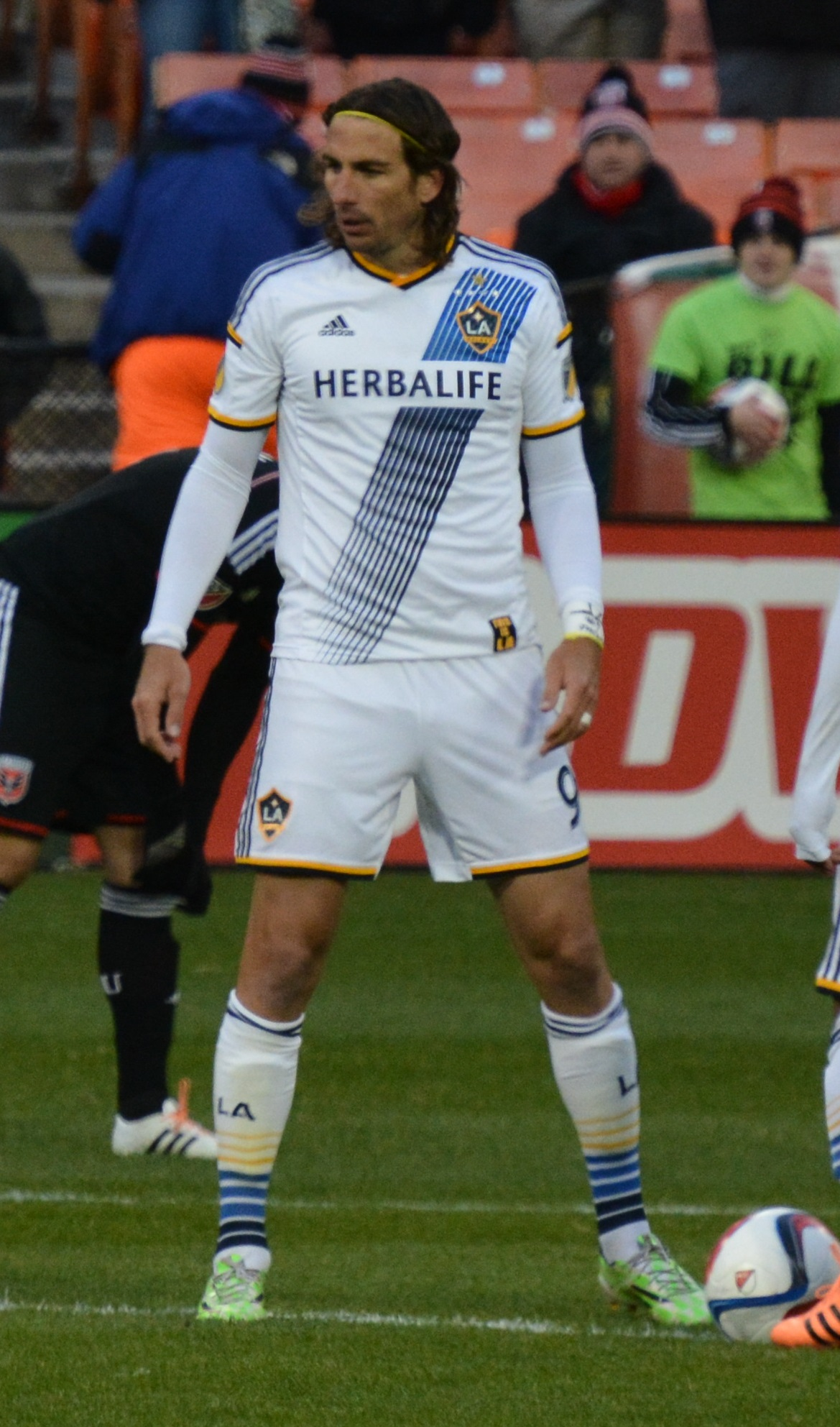
The LA Galaxy selected Alan Gordon 53rd overall. Gordon won 2 MLS Cups and a U.S. Open Cup with the Galaxy and a Supporters' Shield with the San Jose Earthquakes.

Pick #	MLS Team	Player	Position	Affiliation
51	Chicago Fire (Note: #51: Originally belonged to Dallas Burn → . More info needed.)	(Australia) Ryan McGowan	M	Seton Hall University
52	Columbus Crew	(United States) Matthew Haefner	GK	University of Pennsylvania
53	Los Angeles Galaxy	(United States) Alan Gordon	F	Oregon State University
54	Dallas Burn (Note: #54: D.C. United → Dallas Burn. August 19, 2003: Dallas acquired this pick, a first-round 2004 SuperDraft pick, and forward Ali Curtis from D.C. United in exchange for forward Ronald Cerritos.)	(El Salvador) Edwin Miranda	D	Cal State Northridge
55	Colorado Rapids	(Colombia) John Pulido	M	Florida International University
56	New England Revolution (Note: #56: MetroStars → New England Revolution. January 17, 2003: New England acquired this pick from MetroStars in exchange for the #49 pick in the 2003 MLS SuperDraft.)	(Canada) Félix Brillant	F	Franklin Pierce College
57	Los Angeles Galaxy (Note: #57: Kansas City Wizards → Los Angeles Galaxy. January 17, 2003: Los Angeles acquired this pick from Kansas City in exchange for the #60 pick in the 2003 MLS SuperDraft.)	(United States) Chris Aloisi	D	Syracuse University
58	New England Revolution	(Wales) Andy Dorman	M	Boston University
59	Chicago Fire	(United States) Tony McManus	D	UAB
60	MetroStars (Note: #60: San Jose Earthquakes → MetroStars. January 16, 2004: MetroStars acquired this pick from San Jose in exchange for a sixth-round selection in the 2005 MLS SuperDraft. As the 2005 SuperDraft was reduced to four rounds, San Jose received a second-round selection in the 2005 MLS Supplemental Draft from MetroStars to complete the trade.)	(United States) Jeff Parke	D	Drexel University

=== Trade Note ===
- MetroStars received a conditional 2004 SuperDraft pick from Chicago Fire in exchange for the rights to midfielder Andy Williams on March 27, 2003. Instead of the conditional pick, MetroStars received defender Edgar Bartolomeu from Chicago on June 25, 2003, to complete the trade.

== Notable undrafted players ==
- Clyde Simms (MF, East Carolina University) — 220 MLS appearances.
- Troy Perkins (GK, Evansville)

== See also ==
- Draft (sports)
- Generation Adidas
- Major League Soccer
- MLS SuperDraft
