= J. Caleb Clanton =

American philosopher

Education
- Education: Vanderbilt University

Philosophical work
- Era: Contemporary philosophy
- Region: Western philosophy
- School: Christian philosophy and analytic philosophy
- Main interests: Philosophy of religion and moral philosophy

J. Caleb Clanton is professor of philosophy and the Distinguished University Chair in Philosophy and Humanities at Lipscomb University. He previously held faculty appointments at Vanderbilt University, Pepperdine University, and Samford University. Clanton is known for his research on philosophy of religion and moral philosophy.

== Books ==
- Nature and Command: On the Metaphysical Foundations of Morality (with Kraig Martin), University of Tennessee Press, 2022
- God and Morality in Christian Traditions (co-edited with Kraig Martin), Abilene Christian University Press, 2022
- Great Ideas in History, Politics, and Philosophy (co-edited with Richard C. Goode), Baylor University Press, 2021
- Restoration and Philosophy, University of Tennessee Press, 2019
- Philosophy of Religion in the Classical American Tradition, University of Tennessee Press, 2016
- The Philosophy of Religion of Alexander Campbell, University of Tennessee Press, 2013 (winner of the Lester McAllister Prize)
- The Classical American Pragmatists & Religion, Baylor University Press, 2011
- The Ethics of Citizenship, Baylor University Press, 2009
- Religion and Democratic Citizenship, Lexington Books, 2008
