= Ty Maurin =

American soccer player (born 1982)

Personal information
- Full name: Ty Marcelo Maurin
- Date of birth: August 16, 1982 (age 44)
- Place of birth: La Mirada, California, U.S.
- Height: 5 ft 9 in (1.75 m)
- Position: Midfielder

Youth career
- 1995–1998: Santa Anita Breakaway
- 1998–2000: Santa Anita Heat
- 2000–2003: UCLA Bruins

Senior career*
Years	Team	Apps	(Gls)
2003	Orange County Blue Star	5	(0)
2004–2005	FC Dallas	3	(0)
- * Club domestic league appearances and goals

Ty Marcelo Maurin (born August 16, 1982) is an American former soccer player.

== Early life and education ==
Maurin was born on August 16, 1982, in La Mirada, California, to Marcelo and Susan Maurin. In 1991 he was playing for the Division 5 Boys American Youth Soccer Organization Region 67 youth soccer team, Chino Outlaws. He attended Don Antonio Lugo High School in Chino, California where he played soccer for 4 years, winning all-league honors in 1998 and 2000. He attended UCLA, where he had played at least 60 matches beginning in 2000, starting in most of them. This included coming on as a substitute in the championship game of the 2002 NCAA Division I Men's Soccer Tournament.

== Career ==
On January 16, 2004, Maurin was drafted in the third round of the 2004 MLS SuperDraft (29th overall) by the Dallas Burn, who were rebranded as FC Dallas later in 2004. After a scoring a header against the Colorado Rapids in the last 2005 pre-season match, he made three appearances for the club a year later. He only played 17 minutes in the MLS before retiring.
