= Justin Detter =

American retired soccer player

Personal information
- Date of birth: August 7, 1982 (age 44)
- Place of birth: Detroit, Michigan, United States
- Height: 5 ft 11 in (1.80 m)
- Position: Forward

Youth career
- Vardar SC

College career
Years	Team	Apps	(Gls)
2000–2003	Notre Dame Fighting Irish	80	(38)

Senior career*
Years	Team	Apps	(Gls)
- Mid-Michigan Bucks
2004–2005	Kansas City Wizards	10	(0)
Total		10+	(0+)

International career
- United States U17
- * Club domestic league appearances and goals

Justin Detter (born August 7, 1982) is an American retired soccer player who played as a forward for Major League Soccer club Kansas City Wizards. He retired in 2005 citing poor pay ($18,500/year) as his primary factor in his decision.

Detter went to Holly High School and played club soccer at the Detroit club, Vardar. He moved to playing professional soccer via IMG Academy in Bradenton and with the U.S. U-17 national team. After graduating from Bradenton, Detter moved to college soccer at the University of Notre Dame, where he played from 2000 to 2003. Detter was a starter in all four years at Notre Dame. In his senior season, after moving from midfield to forward, he scored 14 goals with 8 assists and was selected for the All-Big East first team. He finished his college career with 38 goals and 28 assists.

On graduating, Detter was selected 47th overall in the 2004 MLS SuperDraft by the Kansas City Wizards. He struggled to be given playing time behind Josh Wolff, Davy Arnaud and Matt Taylor, and he had to undergo two sports hernia surgeries and finished the season with only 162 minutes from six games. During his short career in the MLS, Detter was a U.S. Open Cup champion and a 2004 MLS Cup runner-up.
