= Francisco Gomez (soccer, born 1979) =

American soccer player and coach

Personal information
- Full name: Francisco Gomez
- Date of birth: January 25, 1979 (age 47)
- Place of birth: Watsonville, California, United States
- Height: 5 ft 11 in (1.80 m)
- Position: Midfielder

Youth career
- 1994–1995: Tahuichi Academy

Senior career*
Years	Team	Apps	(Gls)
1998	California Jaguars	11	(1)
1999–2004	Kansas City Wizards	114	(11)
1999	→ MLS Pro-40 (loan)	8	(0)
2000	→ MLS Pro-40 (loan)	9	(1)
2005–2006	Chivas USA	12	(0)
2006	Miami FC	7	(1)
2007–2008	Bakersfield Brigade	15	(2)

International career^{‡}
1995	United States U17		
1999	United States U20		

Managerial career
- 2007–2008: Bakersfield Brigade
- * Club domestic league appearances and goals as of July 23, 2008 ‡ National team caps and goals as of June 13, 2006

Francisco Gomez (born January 25, 1979, in Watsonville, California) is an American former soccer player.

== Club career ==
Gomez joined the Kansas City Wizards in 1999, after playing briefly with the California Jaguars of the A-League. He saw little playing time in his first two years, however - as a rookie, he appeared in seven games, scoring one goal, while in his second year he appeared in 14 (seven starts), scoring two goals and one assist. Gomez played a key role in Kansas City's road to MLS Cup 2000 scoring the game winner in quarterfinal game against the Colorado Rapids. Gomez began to see significantly increased playing time in 2001, when he appeared in 24 games, 18 of them starts, while scoring four goals and six assists. Gomez kept something of a utility role during his later MLS career. In his six years with Kansas City, Gomez appeared in 114 games, registering 14 goals and 14 assists. After the 2004 season, he was selected seventh overall in the MLS Expansion Draft by Chivas USA.

Gomez was released by Chivas in the middle of the 2006 season, and joined Miami FC in the USL First Division for the remainder of the season where he made seven appearances and scored 1 goal.

In January 2007, Gomez was hired as the new player-coach of Bakersfield Brigade.

== National team ==
Although Gomez played a significant role for several of the United States youth national teams, he never earned a cap with the senior team. He captained the US in the 1995 FIFA U-17 World Championship, and was a significant part of the U-20 national team, playing alongside Tim Howard, Carlos Bocanegra, Steve Cherendolo in the 1999 FIFA World Youth Championship in Nigeria.
