= Gilberto Flores (footballer, born 1983) =

Brazilian footballer (born 1983)

Personal information
- Full name: Gilberto Joao Flores
- Date of birth: July 5, 1983 (age 43)
- Place of birth: Toledo, Brazil
- Position: Midfielder

Senior career*
Years	Team	Apps	(Gls)
2004–2005	MetroStars	11	(0)
2010	Noroeste	6	(0)
2011	União Rondonópolis	0	(0)
- * Club domestic league appearances and goals

Gilberto Flores (born July 5, 1983 in Toledo, Brazil) is a Brazilian former soccer midfielder.

== MetroStars ==
Gilberto Flores was signed by the MetroStars on April 1, 2004, from Brazilian club Ginásio Pinhalense de Esportes Atléticos after impressing in the 2004 La Manga Cup, ultimately helping the MetroStars win the tournament. He made his MetroStars MLS debut, and first start, in a 3-1 loss to the San Jose Earthquakes June 12, 2004, playing 67 minutes for the club. He struggled to see playing time in his time with the MetroStars. On June 26, 2004, he suffered a ruptured ankle tendon in a 2-1 loss to the New England Revolution, causing him to miss three months of playing time and requiring surgery. He also faced the task of breaking into a very talented MetroStars midfield, which saw him competing for time with Michael Bradley and Ricardo Clark. After being unable to regain his form following the injury, he was released by the MetroStars in June 2005.

== New England Revolution ==
On July 9, 2005, Flores was picked up by the same New England Revolution team that he suffered his injury against. Flores made one total appearance for the Revolution, in the 2005 U.S. Open Cup fourth round against the Chicago Fire on August 3, 2005. He was released by New England on November 16, 2005.

== Later career ==
Gilberto went on to play for Juventude, Paranavai, and was last with Coritiba.
