= Scott Buete =

American soccer player (born 1980)

Personal information
- Full name: George Scott Buete
- Date of birth: July 23, 1980 (age 46)
- Place of birth: Phoenix, Arizona, U.S.
- Height: 5 ft 7 in (1.70 m)
- Position: Defender

College career
Years	Team	Apps	(Gls)
1999–2003	Maryland Terrapins		(11)

Senior career*
Years	Team	Apps	(Gls)
2004–2005	Chicago Fire	21	(0)
2006–2008	Atlanta Silverbacks	77	(0)
2007–2012	Baltimore Blast (indoor)	77	(11)
2009–2010	Charleston Battery	28	(3)
2010	FC Tampa Bay	6	(0)

Managerial career
- 2014–2021: Maryland Terrapins (assistant)
- 2021: Salisbury University
- * Club domestic league appearances and goals as of January 25, 2019

George Scott Buete (born July 23, 1980, in Phoenix, Arizona) is an American soccer coach and retired soccer player who last played for the Baltimore Blast. In 2021, after seven seasons as assistant coach with the Maryland Terrapins men's soccer program, Buete was head coach of the program at Salisbury University.

== Early life ==
Buete was born in Arizona and moved with his family to Bowie, Maryland, while in elementary school. Already a soccer player, he continued sports activity and graduated from Bowie High School in 1999.

== Career ==
=== College ===
Buete played four seasons for the University of Maryland from 1999 to 2003, starting in 89 games. He finished his career scoring 11 goals, and assisting on 24 more. Buete was named a first team NSCAA All-American his senior year. He graduated in 2023 with a bachelor's degree in marketing.

=== Professional ===
After graduating from Maryland, Buete was drafted 9th overall by the Chicago Fire in the 2004 MLS SuperDraft. Buete played a supporting role his first year, playing 702 minutes over 13 games, while filling in when needed for Chris Armas and Jesse Marsch. After seeing even less time in 2005 due to a bad midseason injury, he was released during the 2006 preseason. Buete had successful surgery to repair a fractured bone in his right foot.

He then signed with the Atlanta Silverbacks of the USL First Division. The Baltimore Blast selected Buete in the fourth round of the 2006 Major Indoor Soccer League (MISL) Dispersal Draft. He played his first game with the Blast on October 9, 2007, winning the 2007–2008 MISL championship with the Blast. This led to Buete joining the Silverbacks after the 2008 season began as the MISL championship series ran into the USL season. MISL collapsed after the 2007–2008 season and the Blast moved to the newly created National Indoor Soccer League. Buete returned to the Blast for the 2008–2009 NISL season as well as the 2009–10 and 2010–11 MISL seasons, as the team NISL obtained rights to the Major League Indoor Soccer moniker.

In January 2009, the Atlanta Silverbacks announced they had withdrawn from USL-1 for the 2009 season and Buete signed with the Charleston Battery on April 3, 2009.

Buete signed with new USSF Division 2 franchise FC Tampa Bay in January 2010. He was released by the club on February 22, 2011.

=== Coaching ===
In May 2014, Buete joined Sasho Cirovski's coaching staff at the University of Maryland. He was an assistant coach with the program into 2021.

In February 2021, Buete was named the head coach for men's soccer at Salisbury University in Salisbury, Maryland. He began with the team in March, and left the coaching position after one season with a 7–8–1 overall record.
