= Brian Roberts (soccer) =

American soccer player and manager

Personal information
- Date of birth: August 28, 1982 (age 44)
- Place of birth: Los Angeles, CA, U.S.
- Height: 6 ft 1 in (1.85 m)
- Position: Defender

Youth career
- 2000–03: Yale

Senior career*
| Years | Team | Apps | (Gls) |
| 2004 | Minnesota Thunder | 16 | (0) |
| 2005–06 | Kansas City Wizards | 12 | (0) |

Managerial career
- 2007–: Chicago Fire NPSL
- * Club domestic league appearances and goals

Brian Roberts (born August 28, 1982) is an American retired soccer defender who played for the Kansas City Wizards of Major League Soccer.

== Player ==
Roberts played college soccer at Yale University from 2000 to 2003; as a sophomore and a junior, he was named second-team All-Ivy, and as a senior he was named to the first team. In addition, he started every Yale game during his four-year career at the school.

Upon graduating, Roberts went undrafted, but was signed as a developmental player by the Wizards. The team promptly loaned him to the A-League's Minnesota Thunder, where he spent all of the 2004 season. With the Thunder, he appeared in 16 games, playing 1172 minutes from a fullback position, garnering one assist.

== Administrative ==
Following the 2006 season, Roberts retired as a player and joined the Wizards front office as an executive for youth sales.
