= Matt Taylor (American soccer) =

American soccer player & coach (born 1981)

Matthew Taylor
Personal information
- Full name: Matthew Taylor
- Date of birth: October 17, 1981 (age 45)
- Place of birth: Columbus, Ohio, United States
- Height: 5 ft 11 in (1.80 m)
- Position: Forward

Team information
- Current team: Ventura County FC (head coach)

Youth career
- Irvine Strikers

College career
Years	Team	Apps	(Gls)
2000–2003	UCLA Bruins		

Senior career*
Years	Team	Apps	(Gls)
2003	Orange County Blue Star	18	(11)
2004	Kansas City Wizards	17	(3)
2005–2007	Chivas USA	37	(2)
2007	Portland Timbers	8	(1)
2008	Hollywood United	?	(?)
2008–2009	TuS Koblenz	22	(7)
2009–2010	FSV Frankfurt	9	(0)
2010–2011	Rot Weiss Ahlen	30	(17)
2011–2012	SC Paderborn 07	23	(4)
2012–2014	Preußen Münster	69	(22)
2014–2016	1. FC Saarbrücken	56	(21)
2016–2017	Kickers Offenbach	22	(2)

Managerial career
- 2018–2020: UCLA Bruins (assistant)
- 2021–2023: Real Salt Lake (assistant)
- 2024–: Ventura County FC
- * Club domestic league appearances and goals as of 21:51, 2 May 2017 (UTC)

Matthew Taylor (born October 17, 1981) is an American soccer coach and former player who is currently the head coach of Ventura County FC in MLS Next Pro.

== College career ==
Born in Columbus, Ohio, Taylor grew up in Irvine, California and played college soccer at UCLA from 2000 to 2003. Taylor was mostly a substitute his first year, but earned a larger role as a sophomore, finishing the season with seven goals and two assists. As a junior, he bettered that, registering 12 goals and eight assists, while being an important part of a UCLA team that won the NCAA Championship. Taylor's senior season was his best, as he scored 14 goals and had 8 assists, was named the Pac-10 Player of the Year, and was a Hermann Trophy finalist. Taylor was the nation's leading scorer in the NCAA tournament during UCLA's championship run in 2002 and was named to the all tournament team at the college cup. Taylor is also the all-time leading scorer for UCLA in post season tournament play. During his college years he played several games alongside former Germany national team player Jürgen Klinsmann with Orange County Blue Star in the USL Premier Development League.

== Professional career ==
An excellent MLS Combine saw the Kansas City Wizards trade up to draft him 4th overall in the 2004 MLS SuperDraft. Although stuck behind Davy Arnaud and Josh Wolff and receiving little playing time in 2003, Taylor showed his scoring acumen registering three goals and an assist in only 524 minutes from a substitute's role.

After his first season, Taylor was left unprotected for the 2004 MLS Expansion Draft, and was selected 8th overall by Chivas USA. He became one of the few non-Hispanics on the squad. Taylor was Chivas USA's first ever player to be named MLS player of the week. Taylor's first four years in MLS were hampered by injuries including a broken tibia, and double hernia surgery. Taylor became a first eleven player for Chivas USA coach Hans Westerhof and responded by leading all offensive categories in a starter's role. Taylor just started to regain the speed and quickness to match his work rate when he decided to leave Chivas USA over a contract dispute with then coach Preki. On July 25, 2007, Taylor signed for Portland Timbers.

He had a short stint at the amateur side Hollywood United in the Los Angeles–based USASA-affiliated Coast Soccer League, where he scored two goals on penalty kicks against his former club the Portland Timbers in the first round of the 2008 Lamar Hunt U.S. Open Cup, helping Hollywood to a shocking 3–2 win over the USL side.

On August 14, 2008, Taylor moved to TuS Koblenz, then playing in Germany's second tier 2. Fußball-Bundesliga just three days before their season started and scored in his first game for the team. On October 5, 2008, he scored a hat trick for Koblenz in a 5–0 win over Kaiserslautern. On May 27, 2009, Taylor signed a two-year contract with FSV Frankfurt, but left for 3. Liga club Rot Weiss Ahlen after playing only on year for FSV. Taylor moved to Preußen Münster for the 2012/13 3. Liga season after playing the 2011/12 season with SC Paderborn 07 in the 2. Bundesliga. Two years later he signed for 1. FC Saarbrücken.

== Coaching career ==
After retiring in 2017, Taylor returned to his alma mater to become an assistant coach at UCLA. In 2021, he became an assistant coach for Major League Soccer club Real Salt Lake. On January 22, 2024, he was announced as the new head coach of Ventura County FC.
