= Zach Thornton =

American soccer player and coach (born 1973)

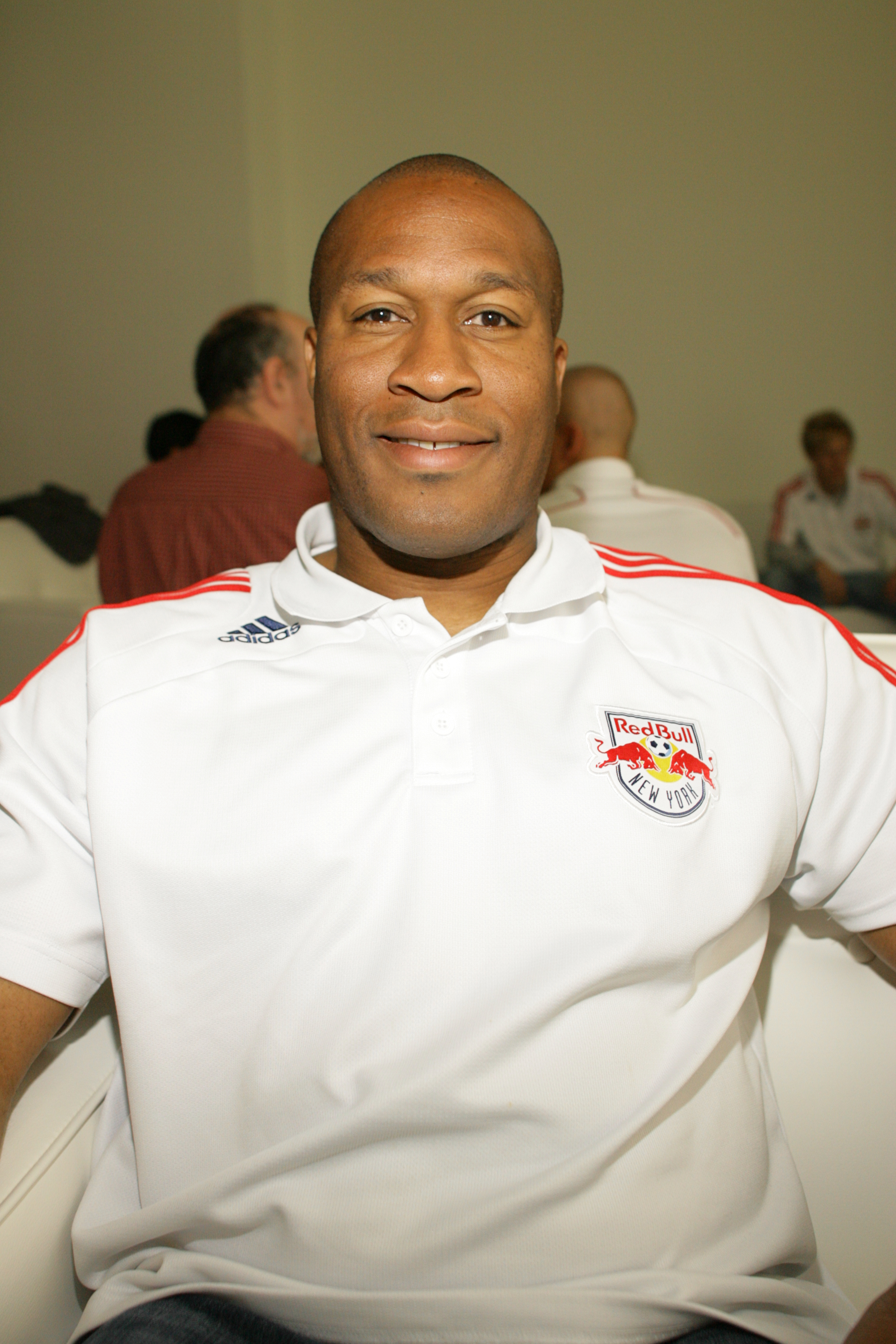
- Thornton in 2008

Personal information
- Date of birth: October 10, 1973 (age 53)
- Place of birth: Edgewood, Maryland, U.S.
- Height: 6 ft 3 in (1.91 m)
- Position: Goalkeeper

College career
Years	Team	Apps	(Gls)
1993–1994	Loyola Greyhounds		

Senior career*
Years	Team	Apps	(Gls)
1993	Baltimore Bays	?	(?)
1996–1997	MetroStars	6	(0)
1997	→ Imperials (loan)	4	(0)
1998–2006	Chicago Fire	215	(0)
2004	→ Benfica (loan)	0	(0)
2007	Colorado Rapids	1	(0)
2008	New York Red Bulls	0	(0)
2008–2011	Chivas USA	60	(0)
Total		286	(0)

International career
1994–2001	United States	8	(0)

Managerial career
- 2012: Loyola Greyhounds (goalkeeping)
- 2012: Elizabethtown Blue Jays (goalkeeping)
- 2013–2014: Villanova Wildcats (associate head coach)
- 2015–2021: D.C. United (goalkeeping)
- 2022: Houston Dynamo (goalkeeping)
- 2022–: Chicago Fire (goalkeeping)
- * Club domestic league appearances and goals

Zach Thornton (born October 10, 1973) is an American soccer player who is goalkeeping coach for Chicago Fire FC. A goalkeeper, he spent 16 seasons in Major League Soccer with the New York/New Jersey MetroStars (1996–97), Chicago Fire (1998–2006), Colorado Rapids (2007), New York Red Bulls (2008) and Chivas USA (2008–11). He was the starting goalkeeper for the Fire when it won MLS Cup '98 in its inaugural year. He, Chris Armas, and C. J. Brown are the only three Fire players to be a part of all six of the club's domestic championships from 1998 through 2006.

== Youth and college ==
The youngest of four siblings, Thornton began playing soccer at age five and lacrosse a year later. His father Ernest, who had endured his share of injuries while playing football at Kentucky State College, had gently steered him away from the gridiron sport. Thornton was a three-sport star in soccer, lacrosse and basketball at The John Carroll School. He attended Essex Community College before completing his education at Loyola College in Maryland. At Loyola, he played both soccer and lacrosse, the latter as a third-team All-American. He was named to the Metro Atlantic Athletic Conference 40th Anniversary Men's Soccer Team on September 1, 2020.

== Playing career ==
=== Professional ===
Thornton was selected in the 7th round (69th overall) by the New York/New Jersey MetroStars in the 1996 MLS Inaugural Player Draft. With then-former U.S. national keeper and local star Tony Meola entrenched in Metro nets, Thornton played only six games during his first two seasons in MLS. In 1997, he played a few games on loan with the North Jersey Imperials of the USISL, whose starting goalie was future Metro and U.S. national teamer Tim Howard.

The Chicago Fire took Thornton in the 1997 MLS Expansion Draft, and his career took off. Beating out Mexican international Jorge Campos for the starting job, Zach lead the expansion Fire to that year's MLS Cup, and was named the league's Goalkeeper of the Year. He spent six years with the Fire, an automatic starter throughout his time there, and frequently at the top of MLS goalkeeping charts. In 2004, Thornton signed a six-month contract with Portuguese club Benfica. He didn't get a single first-team match with them, however, and re-signed with the Fire late in the MLS season. Thornton did not get any playing time, as his former backup Henry Ring had taken hold of the position in Thornton's absence. In 2005, Thornton reclaimed his spot in the Fire's net missing only a few matches due to injury.

Thornton was traded to Colorado Rapids on March 2, 2007, where he was a backup behind Bouna Coundoul during the 2007 season, before he was waived at the end of the year. He was subsequently picked up by New York Red Bulls as the team's reserve goalkeeper for 2008 behind Jon Conway.

Thornton was traded to Chivas USA on August 2, 2008. He and enjoyed an impressive first two seasons with the team, ultimately winning the 2009 Goalkeeper of the Year Award.

Thornton was injured during the 2011 season with Chivas USA and lost his starting role. At season's end, the club declined his 2012 contract option and he entered the 2011 MLS Re-Entry Draft. Thornton was not selected in the draft and became a free agent.

=== International ===
Thornton's first cap with the U.S. national team came in 1994 in a friendly against Jamaica. He backed up Kasey Keller at the 1996 Summer Olympics. Thornton wasn't able to translate his success in MLS to the international level, collecting only eight caps. On December 22, 2009, Thornton received another call up to play a friendly against Honduras on January 23.

== Coaching career ==
Thornton returned to his alma mater as a part-time volunteer goalkeeping coach for the Loyola University Maryland men's soccer program on July 5, 2012. He was named to a similar position on a full-time basis for both the men's and women's programs at Elizabethtown College just over six weeks later on August 20. He was appointed Associate Head Coach with the Villanova University men's soccer program on January 17, 2013. In 2015, Thornton was hired as Goalkeeping Coach for MLS franchise D.C. United. Thornton was named goalkeeping coach for Houston Dynamo on January 13, 2022. Thornton joined Chicago Fire FC as goalkeeping coach in December 2022.

== Honors ==
Chicago Fire

- U.S. Open Cup: 1998, 2000, 2003
- Major League Soccer Eastern Conference Championship: 2003
- MLS Cup: 1998
- Major League Soccer Supporters' Shield: 2003
- Major League Soccer Western Conference Championship: 1998

Individual

- MLS All-Star: 1998, 1999, 2000
- MLS Goalkeeper of the Year: 1998, 2009
- MLS Best XI: 1998, 2009
- MLS Comeback Player of the Year: 2009
