= Nelson Akwari =

American soccer player

Personal information
- Full name: Nelson Ndukwe Akwari
- Date of birth: February 4, 1982 (age 44)
- Place of birth: Houston, Texas, United States
- Height: 6 ft 0 in (1.83 m)
- Position: Defender

Youth career
- 1998–1999: Bradenton Academy

College career
Years	Team	Apps	(Gls)
2000–2002	UCLA Bruins		

Senior career*
Years	Team	Apps	(Gls)
2002	MetroStars	7	(0)
2003–2004	Columbus Crew	30	(0)
2003	→ Cincinnati Riverhawks (loan)	6	(0)
2005–2006	Real Salt Lake	41	(0)
2007	Charlotte Eagles	20	(0)
2008–2009	Charleston Battery	59	(0)
2010	Vancouver Whitecaps	23	(1)
2011	Los Angeles Blues	22	(0)

International career^{‡}
1999	United States U17	6	(0)
2001	United States U20	4	(0)
- * Club domestic league appearances and goals as of August 13, 2011 ‡ National team caps and goals as of April 2, 2010

Nelson Ndukwe Akwari (born February 4, 1982) is an American former soccer player. He began his career with the United States national team youth academy in Bradenton, Florida, and played for several professional clubs in various U.S. leagues.

== Career ==
=== Youth and college ===
Akwari attended Strake Jesuit College Preparatory, a private school in Houston, before attending USSF's Bradenton Academy, where he trained with other Under-17 national teamers like Landon Donovan, DaMarcus Beasley, and Bobby Convey.

Although he considered turning pro, Akwari instead went to UCLA to play college soccer. He stayed at UCLA two years, starting every game as a freshman in 2000, and being named second-team All-Pac-10 as a sophomore.

He returned to UCLA after completion of his soccer career and earned Bachelors, Masters, and Doctorate degrees in engineering.

=== Professional ===
Akwari left college after his sophomore year to pursue opportunities in Europe, but when nothing came of them, he signed a Project-40 contract with MLS late in the 2002 season. Akwari was put into a lottery, which the MetroStars won; Akwari appeared in seven games and was traded during the offseason to the Columbus Crew. Akwari saw little playing time in 2003, appearing in 11 games but starting only five for the Crew, while spending a lot of time on loan to A-League's Cincinnati Riverhawks. In his third year in the league, Akwari began to show much more of the promise that he had as a youth national teamer - he took possession of the starting right back position midseason, and remained there for the rest of the year, ending the season with 16 starts as the Crew won the MLS Supporters' Shield.

After the 2004 season, Akwari was selected tenth overall by Real Salt Lake in the Expansion Draft, reuniting him with old coach John Ellinger. Akwari played 41 games over the 2005 and 2006 seasons.

Akwari signed for USL Second Division side Charlotte Eagles in April 2007, and scored on his debut against Crystal Palace Baltimore on April 20, 2007. He then signed for Charleston Battery in 2008, spending two seasons with the club including a run to the final of the 2008 US Open Cup.

Akwari signed on 26 January 2010 for the Canadian club Vancouver Whitecaps a one-year contract. He scored his first professional goal for Vancouver on April 29, 2010, in a game against the Portland Timbers. On October 19, 2010, the Vancouver Whitecaps released Akwari. Akwari joined the expansion Los Angeles Blues in the USL Pro league for the 2011 season.

Akwari retired following the 2011 season and settled in Charleston, where he works as a senior engineering director for Boeing and is a frequent commentator on Battery game broadcasts.

=== International ===
Akwari has represented the United States at the U-17, U-20 and U-23 levels, playing at the 1999 FIFA U-17 World Championship in New Zealand, and the 2001 FIFA World Youth Championship in Argentina.
