= Henry Ring =

American soccer player

Personal information
- Date of birth: March 16, 1977 (age 49)
- Place of birth: Franklin, Tennessee, United States
- Height: 6 ft 3 in (1.91 m)
- Position: Goalkeeper

Youth career
- 1997–2000: University of South Carolina

Senior career*
Years	Team	Apps	(Gls)
1999	Central Jersey Riptide		
2001–2004	Chicago Fire	30	(0)
2002	→ Milwaukee Rampage (loan)	1	(0)
2003	→ Rochester Rhinos (loan)	0	(0)
- * Club domestic league appearances and goals

Henry Ring (born March 16, 1977, in Franklin, Tennessee) is a retired soccer goalkeeper, who last played for the Chicago Fire in Major League Soccer.

Ring attended the University of South Carolina where he played for the men's soccer team from 1997 to 2000. He was a third team All American both seasons. During his collegiate career, he spent one season with the Central Jersey Riptide in the Premier Development League in 1999.

In February 2001, the Chicago Fire selected Ring in the third round of the 2001 MLS SuperDraft. He saw no time his first season with the team, and only played in one league game each of the following two years. In 2002, the Fire sent Ring on loan to the Milwaukee Rampage for one game. In 2003, he went on loan to the Rochester Rhinos as back up to Bill Andracki. In 2004, he played in 28 league games, recording seven shutouts and starting for the East in the MLS All-Star Game. In the offseason, after Chicago welcomed back Zach Thornton and gave him back his old starting spot without a competition, Ring was traded to F.C. Dallas for a draft pick. However, Ring chose not to sign with Dallas, and after an unsuccessful bid at winning the outright starting job with the MetroStars, Ring retired.
