= Taylor Graham =

American soccer player (born 1980)

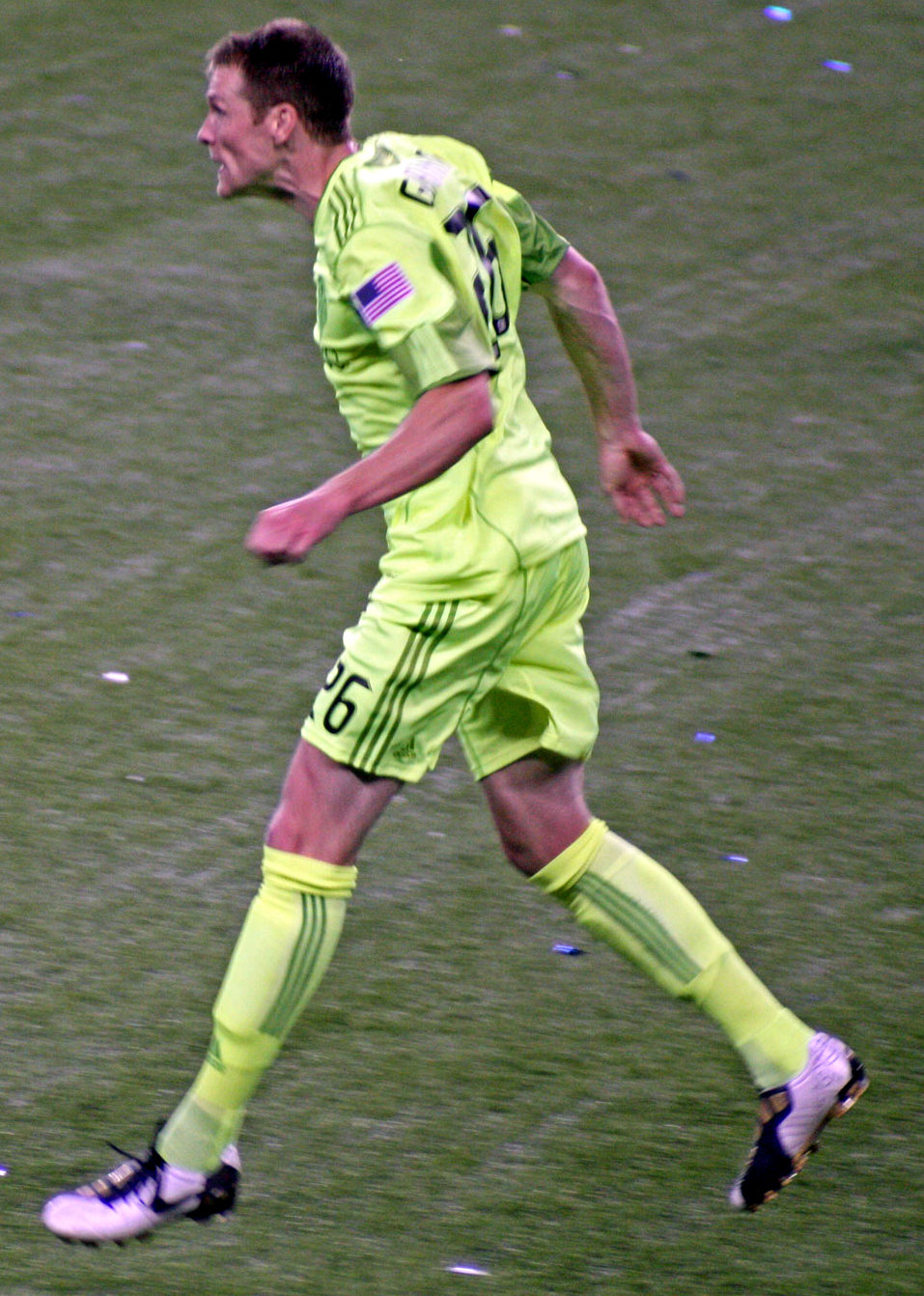
- Graham playing for Seattle Sounders FC plays against Boca Juniors on May 28, 2010

Personal information
- Date of birth: June 3, 1980 (age 46)
- Place of birth: Fair Oaks, California, U.S.
- Height: 6 ft 4 in (1.93 m)
- Position: Defender

College career
Years	Team	Apps	(Gls)
1999–2002	Stanford Cardinal	66	(3)

Senior career*
Years	Team	Apps	(Gls)
2003–2004	Kansas City Wizards	19	(1)
2005	Seattle Sounders	28	(2)
2006–2007	New York Red Bulls	15	(0)
2007–2008	Seattle Sounders	38	(3)
2009–2011	Seattle Sounders FC	1	(0)
Total		101	(6)

International career
2008	Puerto Rico	3	(1)
- * Club domestic league appearances and goals

Taylor Graham (born June 3, 1980) is an American former soccer player.

== Career ==
=== Youth and college ===
Graham attended Rio Americano High School and played five years of college soccer at Stanford University, registering as a walk-on his freshman year of 1998, and only appearing in two games in 1999. After appearing in 18 games his sophomore season, Graham started every possible game his final two, winning first team All-Pac-10 his senior year, as he led the Cardinal to an appearance in the NCAA College Cup.

=== Professional ===
After graduating from Stanford, Graham was drafted 33rd overall in the 2003 MLS SuperDraft by the Kansas City Wizards. Graham was signed to a developmental contract, making two appearances and playing a total of ten minutes. In his second season Graham was given significantly more playing time, playing as both a right back and central defender. After a season in the USL First Division when he played every minute for the Seattle Sounders, led his team to the title, and was named USL Defender of the Year, Graham was acquired by the MetroStars, now New York Red Bulls. He was released midway through the 2007 season and signed with his former club Seattle Sounders. He then signed with Seattle Sounders FC, a continuation of the Sounders in Major League Soccer. On May 26, 2010, he had his first appearance of the 2010 season in a friendly against Boca Juniors of Argentina, playing the full 90 minutes and putting up a solid performance.

Graham announced his retirement on December 2, 2011, after he was dropped from the roster by the Seattle Sounders.

=== International ===
Graham represented Puerto Rico in three international friendlies (including the team's first win in 14 years) during early 2008. The national team coach Colin Clarke had misunderstood the requirements to play for Puerto Rican national side following a change to the eligibility criteria.

Previously, all U.S. citizens were eligible for Puerto Rico national teams, but now the player pool is restricted to players who have lived on the island for at least five years, meaning that Graham is no longer eligible for the Puerto Rico national team per federation rules.

==== International goals ====
#	Date	Venue	Opponent	Score	Result	Competition
1	January 16, 2008	Thomas Robinson Stadium, Nassau, Bahamas	Bahamas	0 - 1	0 - 2	Friendly

== Honors ==
=== Kansas City Wizards ===
- Lamar Hunt U.S. Open Cup (1): 2004
- Major League Soccer Western Conference Championship (1): 2004

=== Seattle Sounders ===
- USL First Division Championship (2): 2005, 2007
- USL First Division Commissioner's Cup (1): 2007

=== Seattle Sounders FC ===
- Lamar Hunt U.S. Open Cup (3): 2009, 2010, 2011

== Television ==
Graham appeared on The Price Is Right on June 24, 2009. In the showcase he spoke on one of the prizes which was a vacation to Seattle, to go to any 2 home games of Seattle Sounders and watch them play.

== Personal life ==
After retiring as a player, Taylor Graham became Director of Business Operations for his former club, Seattle Sounders FC.
