= Denny Clanton =

American soccer player

Personal information
- Date of birth: April 4, 1982 (age 44)
- Place of birth: Hammond, Indiana
- Position: Defender

College career
Years	Team	Apps	(Gls)
2000–2004	University of Dayton		

Senior career*
Years	Team	Apps	(Gls)
2005	Chicago Fire U-23		
2005	Chicago Fire FC	10	
- Chicago Storm
- * Club domestic league appearances and goals

Denny Clanton (born April 4, 1982, in Hammond, Indiana) is an American soccer player who last played defense for the Chicago Fire of Major League Soccer.

Clanton was drafted 38th overall by the Fire in the 2004 MLS Superdraft out of University of Dayton, succeeding in making the team's developmental roster. While at Dayton, Clanton was named All-Atlantic 10 first team as well as All-Ohio Player of the Year in his senior 2004 season. He played a year in MLS, appearing in ten games. After being dropped by Chicago, Clanton signed with MISL's Chicago Storm.
