= 2005 Kansas City Wizards season =

Kansas City Wizards
2005 season
- Head coach: Bob Gansler
- Major League Soccer: East: 5th Overall: 7th
- U.S. Open Cup: Quarterfinals
- CONCACAF Champions' Cup: Quarterfinals
- Top goalscorer: League: Josh Wolff (10); All: Josh Wolff (12)
- Average home league attendance: 9,691
Home colors	Away colors

The 2005 Kansas City Wizards season was the 10th season for both the club and the league altogether. 2005 marked the entrance of two new clubs, Real Salt Lake and Chivas USA, increasing the league to 12 teams; as a result of these Western additions, the Wizards moved to the Eastern Conference.

In the East, Kansas City attained 45 points (11W 9L 12D), finishing fifth in the East and 12th overall and missing the postseason by two points behind MetroStars. The 2005 season was the first time since 1999 the Wizards did not participate in MLS' large-scale postseason, and Kansas City joined the Western expansion teams and the Columbus Crew as the only teams to not qualify for the 2005 playoffs. In addition, attendance at Arrowhead Stadium, which was higher than most MLS teams at the time despite playing in a large cavernous NFL stadium, dipped below 10,000 after a few years of increases.

Despite these developments, two Kansas City players earned honors. Newly blooded U.S. national team member Jimmy Conrad was named Defender of the Year, and Wizards stalwart Chris Klein recovered from a torn ACL sustained in the prior season to become Comeback Player of the Year.

== Squad ==
Note: Flags indicate national team as defined under FIFA eligibility rules; some limited exceptions apply. Players may hold more than one non-FIFA nationality.

No.	Pos.	Nation	Player
1	GK	USA	Bo Oshoniyi
3	DF	USA	Nick Garcia
4	DF	JAM	Shavar Thomas
5	MF	USA	Kerry Zavagnin
6	DF	USA	Jose Burciaga Jr.
7	MF	USA	Diego Gutierrez
8	MF	BRA	Diego Walsh
9	MF	USA	Sasha Victorine
11	MF	USA	Preki
12	DF	USA	Jimmy Conrad
13	DF	USA	Taylor Graham
13/28	DF	USA	Dustin Branan
14	MF	USA	Jack Jewsbury
15	FW	USA	Josh Wolff

No.	Pos.	Nation	Player
16	DF	USA	Brian Roberts
17	MF	USA	Chris Klein
18	MF	JAM	Khari Stephenson
18	FW	FIN	Antti Sumiala
19	FW	TRI	Scott Sealy
22	FW	USA	Davy Arnaud
23	MF	ROU	Alex Zotinca
24	GK	USA	Will Hesmer
26	MF	USA	Ryan Raybould
27	FW	USA	Justin Detter
27	MF	JAM	Jermaine Hue
29	FW	USA	Ryan Pore
30	GK	USA	Martin Hutton
35	FW	ENG	Stephen Armstrong

== Competitions ==
=== Major League Soccer ===
Overall								Home						Away					
Pld	W	D	L	GF	GA	GD	Pts	W	D	L	GF	GA	GD	W	D	L	GF	GA	GD
32	11	12	9	52	44	+8	45	6	6	4	23	18	+5	5	6	5	29	26	+3

Last updated: 2005.
Source: Major League Soccer

Date	Opponents	H / A	Result F – A	Scorers	Attendance
April 2, 2005	Colorado Rapids	H	3–2	Wolff; Jewsbury; Klein
April 16, 2005	MetroStars	A	2–2	Jewsbury; Klein
April 23, 2005	San Jose Earthquakes	A	2–3	Sealy; Klein
April 30, 2005	D.C. United	H	0–0
May 7, 2005	FC Dallas	H	3–3	Victorine; Wolff; Klein
May 14, 2005	Columbus Crew	A	4–0	Zotinca; Wolff 2 Arnaud
May 21, 2005	D.C. United	A	2–3	Own goal Sealy
May 25, 2005	MetroStars	H	1–0	Arnaud
May 28, 2005	San Jose Earthquakes	H	1–0	Jewsbury
June 1, 2005	Chivas USA	A	1–1	Burciaga Jr.
June 4, 2005	New England Revolution	A	1–1	Victorine
June 11, 2005	New England Revolution	H	0–2
June 18, 2005	Chicago Fire S.C.	A	1–1	Preki
June 25, 2005	Chivas USA	H	3–0	Conrad; Arnaud; Victorine
June 29, 2005	Columbus Crew	H	1–1	Burciaga Jr.
July 4, 2005	Colorado Rapids	A	1–2	Klein
July 9, 2005	D.C. United	A	1–0	Victorine
July 16, 2005	Real Salt Lake	H	3–2	Sealy 2 Own goal
July 20, 2005	D.C. United	H	1–1	Sealy
July 23, 2005	Columbus Crew	A	0–2
August 6, 2005	New England Revolution	A	2–1	Klein; Sealy
August 10, 2005	Chicago Fire S.C.	A	3–2	Wolff 2 Victorine
August 13, 2005	Real Salt Lake	A	4–2	Victorine 2 Sealy; Klein
August 19, 2005	Chicago Fire S.C.	H	3–0	Sealy 2 Jewsbury
August 26, 2005	Columbus Crew	A	0–1
September 3, 2005	MetroStars	A	2–2	Pore; Wolff
September 10, 2005	MetroStars	H	0–1
September 17, 2005	Los Angeles Galaxy	H	2–2	Arnaud; Wolff
September 25, 2005	Los Angeles Galaxy	A	1–2	Wolff
October 1, 2005	Chicago Fire S.C.	H	0–1
October 8, 2005	New England Revolution	H	2–2	Wolff; Conrad
October 15, 2005	FC Dallas	A	2–2	Arnaud; Preki

=== U.S. Open Cup ===
Date	Round	Opponents	H / A	Result F – A	Scorers	Attendance
August 3, 2005	Fourth round	Des Moines Menace	H	6–1	Arnaud 2 Wolff 2 Victorine; Sealy
August 24, 2005	Quarterfinals	Minnesota Thunder	H	1–3	Pore

=== CONCACAF Champions' Cup ===
Date	Round	Opponents	H / A	Result F – A	Scorers	Attendance
March 9, 2005	Quarterfinals	Deportivo Saprissa	H	0–0
March 17, 2005	Quarterfinals	Deportivo Saprissa	A	1–2 (AET)	Burciaga Jr.

== Final Squad statistics ==
No.	Pos.	Name	MLS		USOC		CCC		Total		Minutes		Discipline	
No.	Pos.	Name	Apps	Goals	Apps	Goals	Apps	Goals	Apps	Goals	League	Total	Yellow card	Red card
17	MF	(United States) Chris Klein	31	7	2	0	2	0	35	7	2765	3093	0	0
22	FW	(United States) Davy Arnaud	31	5	2	2	2	0	35	7	2527	2917	0	0
1	GK	(United States) Bo Oshoniyi	32	0	0	0	2	0	34	0	2880	3090	0	0
6	DF	(United States) Jose Burciaga Jr.	31	2	1	0	2	1	34	3	2667	2967	0	0
3	DF	(United States) Nick Garcia	30	0	2	0	2	0	34	0	2678	3023	0	0
9	MF	(United States) Sasha Victorine	30	7	1	1	2	0	33	8	2658	2939	0	0
14	MF	(United States) Jack Jewsbury	29	4	2	0	2	0	33	4	1001	1169	0	0
5	MF	(United States) Kerry Zavagnin	28	0	2	0	2	0	32	0	2421	2784	0	0
19	FW	(Trinidad and Tobago) Scott Sealy	28	9	2	1	0	0	30	10	1669	1785	0	0
12	DF	(United States) Jimmy Conrad	25	2	1	0	2	0	28	2	2241	2496	0	0
4	DF	(Jamaica) Shavar Thomas	25	0	2	0	0	0	27	0	2012	2169	0	0
15	FW	(United States) Josh Wolff	22	10	2	2	2	0	26	12	1910	2210	0	0
7	MF	(United States) Diego Gutierrez	21	0	1	0	2	0	24	0	1701	1963	0	0
23	MF	(Romania) Alex Zotinca	16	1	1	0	2	0	19	1	1061	1268	0	0
11	FW	(United States) Preki	16	2	2	0	0	0	18	2	478	554	0	0
16	DF	(United States) Brian Roberts	11	0	1	0	0	0	12	0	338	383	0	0
24	MF	(Jamaica) Khari Stephenson	6	0	2	0	2	0	10	0	146	313	0	0
29	FW	(United States) Ryan Pore	8	1	1	1	0	0	9	2	285	312	0	0
27	FW	(United States) Justin Detter	4	0	0	0	0	0	4	0	41	41	0	0
27	MF	(Jamaica) Jermaine Hue	3	0	0	0	0	0	3	0	55	55	0	0
8	MF	(Brazil) Diego Walsh	1	0	0	0	2	0	3	0	16	87	0	0
13/28	DF	(United States) Dustin Branan	1	0	2	0	0	0	3	0	1	43	0	0
24	GK	(United States) Will Hesmer	0	0	2	0	0	0	2	0	0	180	0	0
18	FW	(Finland) Antti Sumiala	2	0	0	0	0	0	2	0	116	116	0	0
26	MF	(United States) Ryan Raybould	1	0	0	0	0	0	1	0	11	11	0	0
