= 2003 Kansas City Wizards season =

Kansas City Wizards
2003 season
- Head coach: Bob Gansler
- Major League Soccer: West: 2nd Overall: 4th
- USOC: Fourth Round
- Playoffs: Conference Finals
- Top goalscorer: League: Preki (12); All: Preki (12)
- Average home league attendance: 15,573
Home colors	Away colors

== Squad ==
Note: Flags indicate national team as defined under FIFA eligibility rules; some limited exceptions apply. Players may hold more than one non-FIFA nationality.

No.	Pos.	Nation	Player
1	GK	USA	Tony Meola
3	DF	USA	Nick Garcia
4	DF	USA	Carey Talley
5	MF	USA	Kerry Zavagnin
6	DF	USA	Jose Burciaga Jr.
7	MF	USA	Diego Gutierrez
8	MF	USA	Chris Brown
9	FW	ARG	Darío Fabbro
9	FW	ARG	Jorge Vázquez
10	MF	USA	Francisco Gomez
11	MF	USA	Preki
12	DF	USA	Jimmy Conrad
13	FW	JAM	Wolde Harris
14	MF	USA	Jack Jewsbury

No.	Pos.	Nation	Player
15	FW	USA	Josh Wolff
16	FW	ENG	Stephen Armstrong
17	MF	USA	Chris Klein
18	DF	USA	Chris Brunt
19	MF	USA	Eric Quill
20	FW	RUS	Igor Simutenkov
21	DF	USA	Kevin Friedland
22	FW	USA	Davy Arnaud
23	MF	ROU	Alex Zotinca
25	GK	USA	Bo Oshoniyi
26	DF	USA	Taylor Graham
28	FW	USA	Byron Carmichael
30	GK	USA	Taly Goode

== Competitions ==
=== Major League Soccer ===
Pos	Team	Pld	W	L	T	GF	GA	GD	Pts	Qualification
1	San Jose Earthquakes	30	14	7	9	45	35	+10	51	MLS Cup Playoffs
2	Kansas City Wizards	30	11	10	9	48	44	+4	42	MLS Cup Playoffs
3	Colorado Rapids	30	11	12	7	40	45	−5	40	MLS Cup Playoffs
4	Los Angeles Galaxy	30	9	12	9	35	35	0	36	MLS Cup Playoffs
5	Dallas Burn	30	6	19	5	35	64	−29	23	

Source: MLS

Overall								Home						Away					
Pld	W	D	L	GF	GA	GD	Pts	W	D	L	GF	GA	GD	W	D	L	GF	GA	GD
30	11	9	10	48	44	+4	42	8	3	4	32	25	+7	3	6	6	16	19	−3

Last updated: 2003.
Source: Major League Soccer

Date	Opponents	H / A	Result F – A	Scorers	Attendance
April 12, 2003	D.C. United	H	3–2 (OT)	Preki; Klein; Brown
April 19, 2003	San Jose Earthquakes	A	1–1	Own goal
April 26, 2003	Chicago Fire S.C.	H	2–3	Simutenkov; Conrad
May 3, 2003	Columbus Crew	H	2–2	Preki; Quill
May 10, 2003	Dallas Burn	A	3–1	Quill; Brown; Klein
May 14, 2003	New England Revolution	H	1–1	Simutenkov
May 17, 2003	D.C. United	A	1–1	Preki
May 24, 2003	Los Angeles Galaxy	H	2–1	Simutenkov; Preki
May 31, 2003	New England Revolution	A	2–2	Preki 2
June 7, 2003	MetroStars	H	2–1	Arnaud; Wolff
June 14, 2003	Los Angeles Galaxy	A	1–2	Wolff
June 21, 2003	Chicago Fire S.C.	H	4–2	Conrad; Gomez; Zotinca; Preki
June 28, 2003	San Jose Earthquakes	A	0–0
July 4, 2003	Colorado Rapids	A	2–3	Preki; Armstrong
July 12, 2003	Dallas Burn	H	5–1	Brunt; Simutenkov 2 Quill; Armstrong
July 19, 2003	Columbus Crew	A	1–0	Simutenkov
July 26, 2003	Chicago Fire S.C.	A	0–2
August 8, 2003	San Jose Earthquakes	H	0–1
August 13, 2003	MetroStars	A	0–0
August 16, 2003	Dallas Burn	A	2–3	Preki; Gomez
August 22, 2003	Colorado Rapids	H	2–2	Arnaud; Preki
August 31, 2003	Columbus Crew	A	0–1
September 6, 2003	MetroStars	H	1–2	Preki
September 13, 2003	Colorado Rapids	A	0–1
September 20, 2003	San Jose Earthquakes	H	1–4	Arnaud
September 27, 2003	Los Angeles Galaxy	A	2–1	Klein 2
October 4, 2003	Colorado Rapids	H	4–2	Conrad; Klein 2 Gomez
October 11, 2003	Los Angeles Galaxy	H	2–1 (OT)	Zavagnin; Simutenkov
October 18, 2003	Dallas Burn	H	1–0	Conrad
October 25, 2003	D.C. United	A	1–1	Preki

=== U.S. Open Cup ===
Date	Round	Opponents	H / A	Result F – A	Scorers	Attendance
August 5, 2003	Fourth Round	Colorado Rapids	A	2–3	Simutenkov 2

=== MLS Cup Playoffs ===
Date	Round	Opponents	H / A	Result F – A	Scorers	Attendance
November 4, 2003	Conference Semifinals	Colorado Rapids	A	1–1	Harris
November 8, 2003	Conference Semifinals	Colorado Rapids	H	2–0	Simutenkov; Klein
November 15, 2003	Conference Finals	San Jose Earthquakes	A	2–3 (ASDET)	Simutenkov; Klein

== Squad statistics ==
No.	Pos.	Name	MLS		USOC		Playoffs		Total		Minutes		Discipline	
No.	Pos.	Name	Apps	Goals	Apps	Goals	Apps	Goals	Apps	Goals	League	Total	Yellow card	Red card
12	DF	(United States) Jimmy Conrad	30	4	1	0	3	0	34	4	2777	3164	0	0
11	FW	(United States) Preki	30	12	1	0	3	0	34	12	2678	3001	0	0
1	GK	(United States) Tony Meola	30	0	0	0	3	0	33	0	2797	3094	0	0
3	DF	(United States) Nick Garcia	29	0	1	0	3	0	33	0	2689	3076	0	0
5	MF	(United States) Kerry Zavagnin	29	1	0	0	3	0	32	1	2487	2784	0	0
17	MF	(United States) Chris Klein	27	6	1	0	3	2	31	8	2527	2914	0	0
19	FW	(United States) Eric Quill	27	3	1	0	3	0	31	3	2261	2537	0	0
10	MF	(United States) Francisco Gomez	26	3	1	0	0	0	27	3	1644	1734	0	0
16	FW	(England) Stephen Armstrong	22	2	1	0	3	0	27	2	1102	1296	0	0
20	FW	(Russia) Igor Simutenkov	21	7	1	2	2	2	24	11	1435	1667	0	0
4	DF	(United States) Carey Talley	20	0	1	0	3	0	24	0	1344	1731	0	0
7	MF	(United States) Diego Gutierrez	20	0	0	0	3	0	23	0	1559	1856	0	0
23	MF	(Romania) Alex Zotinca	20	1	1	0	2	0	23	1	1239	1411	0	0
22	FW	(United States) Davy Arnaud	18	3	1	0	3	0	22	3	818	884	0	0
8	MF	(United States) Chris Brown	18	2	0	0	0	0	18	2	1189	1189	0	0
15	FW	(United States) Josh Wolff	13	2	0	0	1	0	14	2	872	918	0	0
13	FW	(Jamaica) Wolde Harris	10	0	0	0	3	1	13	1	560	821	0	0
9	FW	(Argentina) Darío Fabbro	8	0	1	0	0	0	9	0	179	239	0	0
18/28	--	Chris Brunt	4	1	1	0	0	0	5	1	166	174	0	0
6	DF	(United States) Jose Burciaga Jr.	4	0	0	0	0	0	4	0	347	347	0	0
25	GK	(United States) Bo Oshoniyi	1	0	1	0	0	0	2	0	8	98	0	0
14	MF	(United States) Jack Jewsbury	2	0	0	0	0	0	2	0	61	61	0	0
26	DF	(United States) Taylor Graham	2	0	0	0	0	0	2	0	10	10	0	0

Final Statistics
