= MLS Cup 2004 =

2004 edition of the MLS Cup

- Event: MLS Cup
D.C. United	Kansas City Wizards
3	2
- Date: November 14, 2004
- Venue: Home Depot Center, Carson, California, US
- MLS Cup MVP: Alecko Eskandarian (D.C. United)
- Attendance: 25,797
- Weather: Clear, 81 °F (27 °C)

MLS Cup 2004 was the ninth edition of the MLS Cup, the championship match of Major League Soccer (MLS), which took place on November 14, 2004, at the Home Depot Center in Carson, California. It was contested between D.C. United and the Kansas City Wizards to decide the champion of the 2004 season. The two teams had qualified for the playoffs after seasons with mixed results that ended in top-two finishes in their respective conferences.

D.C. United won the match 3–2, scoring all three of its goals in a seven-minute span during the first half after the Wizards had taken an early lead. Alecko Eskandarian was named the match MVP for scoring the first two goals for D.C., one of which included an alleged handball that was uncalled. The 2004 final featured the first red card in MLS Cup history, awarded for a handball which resulted in a penalty kick for Kansas City's second goal. It was D.C. United's fourth MLS Cup title and their first since 1999, and manager Peter Nowak became the first person to win the MLS Cup as a player and coach.

== Venue ==
The Home Depot Center in Carson, California, the home venue of the Los Angeles Galaxy, was announced by the league as the host of MLS Cup 2004 on June 23, 2004. The 27,000-seat stadium had hosted the previous edition of the MLS Cup and the 2003 FIFA Women's World Cup Final in its first year of operation. The 2004 final marked the first time that a stadium had hosted consecutive editions of the MLS Cup, which would be followed by Pizza Hut Park in Frisco, Texas in 2005 and 2006.

== Road to the final ==
The MLS Cup is the post-season championship of Major League Soccer (MLS), a professional club soccer league based in the United States. The 2004 season was the ninth in the league's history and was contested by ten teams in two conferences, divided into the east and west. Each team played a total of 30 matches in the regular season from April to October, facing teams within their conference four times, outside of their conference two times, and playing an additional home game against a non-conference team. The playoffs ran from mid-October to November and were contested by the top four teams in each conference. It was organized into three rounds: a home-and-away series with a winner determined by aggregate score in the Conference Semifinals, a single-match Conference Final, and the MLS Cup final.

MLS Cup 2004 was contested by D.C. United and the Kansas City Wizards. Both teams had previously won the MLS Cup and finished in the top two seeds of their respective conferences in regular season play. D.C. and Kansas City had played each other twice during the regular season, trading 1–0 away wins at their respective homes: the Wizards won at RFK Memorial Stadium in May and D.C. United won at Arrowhead Stadium in July. Kansas City qualified for the playoffs as the top seed in the Western Conference, finishing level with Supporters' Shield winners Columbus Crew on points, while D.C. United rode late-season momentum to finish with a record slightly above .500.

=== D.C. United ===
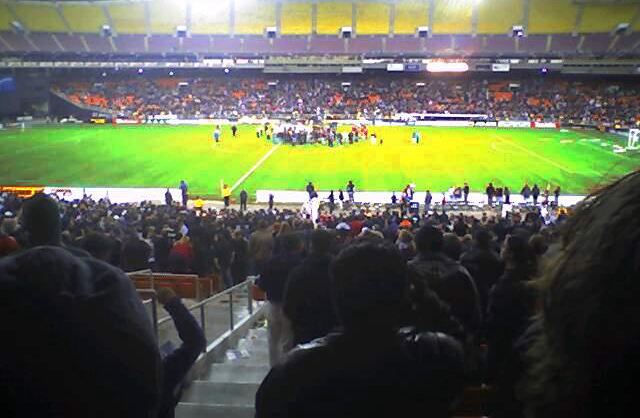
D.C. United players and coaches celebrating their win over the New England Revolution in the 2004 Eastern Conference Championship

D.C. United won three MLS Cup titles in the first four seasons of the league's existence, only finishing as runners-up in 1998, and established a dynasty under head coaches Bruce Arena and Thomas Rongen. From 2000 to 2002, however, D.C. failed to qualify for the playoffs for three consecutive seasons and Rongen was fired. Ray Hudson lead the team to a playoffs return in 2003, where they lost 4–0 on aggregate to the Chicago Fire in the first round.

In January 2004, D.C. hired recently retired Chicago Fire midfielder Peter Nowak as its fourth head coach in nine seasons. The last remaining player from the club's inaugural season, forward Marco Etcheverry, left the club at the end of the 2003 season. To replace Etcheverry, the club recalled Jaime Moreno from the MetroStars and drafted 14-year-old forward Freddy Adu, who had already agreed in November to sign with them. Nowak implemented an aggressive playstyle that emphasized counterattacks and team-oriented play that took hold late in the season.

The club earned a 5–5–5 record at the beginning of the season, including a 271-minute scoreless streak and a four-match unbeaten streak that was capped with a 6–2 win over the MetroStars. After a four-match winless streak to start the second half of the season, D.C. United found a more consistent rhythm and finished the season with a winning record and a ten-match home unbeaten streak. The club signed Argentine midfielder Christian Gómez in the summer transfer window and paired him with forward Alecko Eskandarian, who lead D.C. in goals scored, to close out the season; rookie goalkeeper Troy Perkins was promoted to the starting lineup and played in place of Nick Rimando before he returned later in the season.

By winning five of their final six regular season matches, D.C. United clinched the second-place seed in the Eastern Conference behind the Columbus Crew. In the Conference Semifinals, D.C. played host to their Atlantic Cup rivals, the New York/New Jersey MetroStars, who they had played in the final week of the season. D.C. United won 2–0 in the first leg at Giants Stadium on second-half goals by Earnie Stewart and Eskandarian. In the second leg of the series at RFK Memorial Stadium, D.C. defeated the MetroStars 2–0, with late goals scored by Moreno and Bryan Namoff, and advanced to the Conference Final on an aggregate score of 4–0.

D.C. United faced the fourth-seeded New England Revolution, who upset the Columbus Crew in the semifinals, in the Conference Final at RFK Memorial Stadium on November 6, 2004. During the match, considered one of the best in MLS history, D.C. took the lead three times and New England responded with three equalizing goals. Eskandarian opened the scoring in the 11th minute on a defensive mistake, but Taylor Twellman leveled the score at 1–1 six minutes later with a volleyed shot from inside the box. Jamie Moreno restored the lead for D.C. in the 21st minute, curling a shot around the left post to beat goalkeeper Matt Reis; New England were awarded a penalty kick after the ball hit the arm of defender Brian Carroll, and Steve Ralston's shot deflected off the post and Nick Rimando before going into the net and tying the match 2–2 at halftime. Gómez scored D.C.'s third goal in the 67th minute, heading a cross from Earnie Stewart, but New England's Pat Noonan responded with a headed goal in the 85th minute that tied the match at the end of regulation time.

Despite several attempts at goal, the match remained tied 3–3 after extra time and would be the first MLS playoff match decided by a penalty shootout. After an opening round in which neither penalty taker scored, five consecutive penalties were scored to give D.C. a 3–2 lead. In the fourth round, the shot by Jay Heaps for New England was saved by Rimando, but the follow-up by Moreno was saved by Reis to prevent the Revolution from being eliminated. New England's Shalrie Joseph scored his penalty to trigger a sudden death round, which saw Brian Carroll score and Clint Dempsey's shot saved by Nick Rimando. The penalty shootout ended in a 4–3 victory for D.C. United, who clinched an appearance in their fifth MLS Cup final.

=== Kansas City Wizards ===
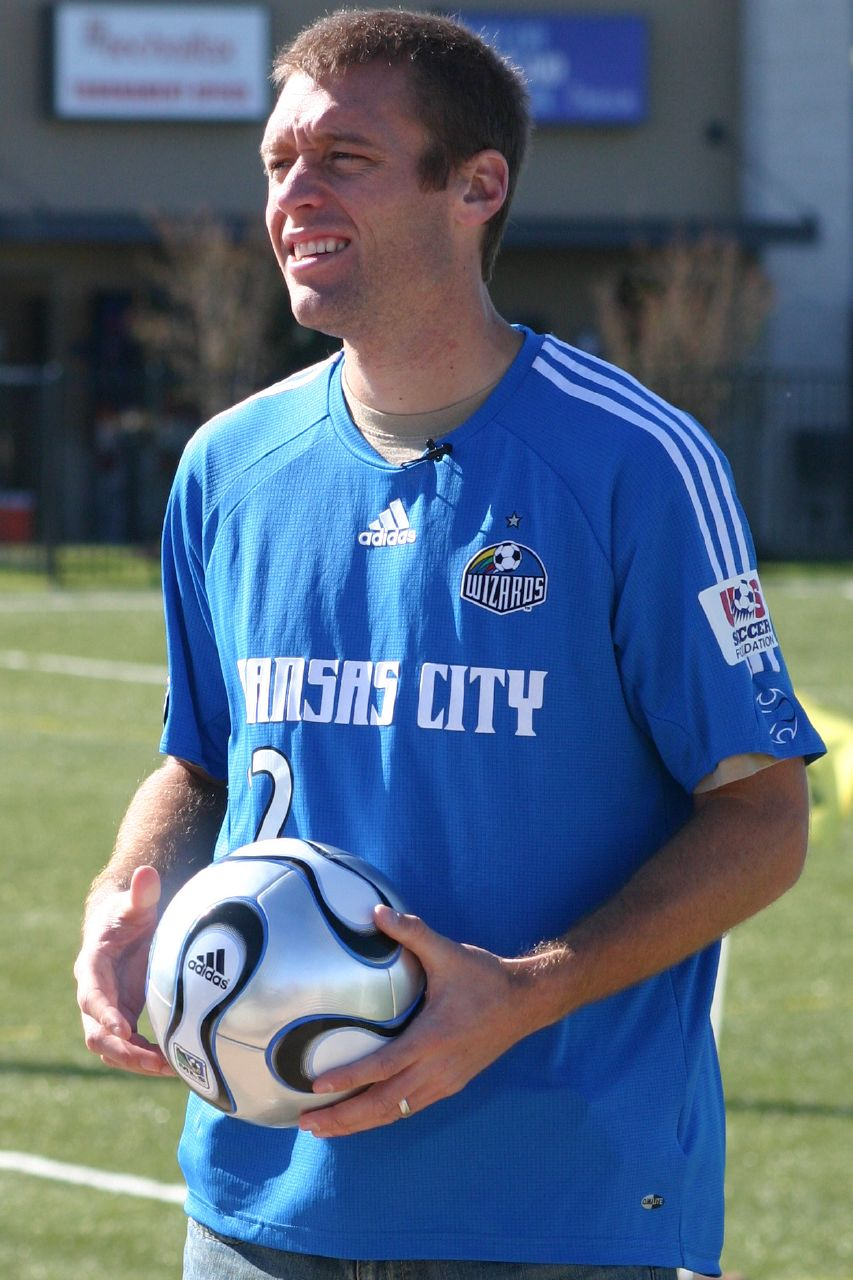
Defender Jimmy Conrad, one of two Wizards players named to the 2004 MLS Best XI

The Kansas City Wizards had won the MLS Cup in 2000, defeating the Chicago Fire, in the same season that they had clinched the Supporters' Shield for the best regular season record. The team qualified for the playoffs in six of their first eight seasons, including four consecutive appearances under manager Bob Gansler. The Wizards finished in second place in the Western Conference at the end of the 2003 season, relying on 40-year-old forward Preki as he led the league in scoring and was named the most valuable player. The team advanced past the Colorado Rapids and qualified for the Conference Finals, where they were defeated 3–2 by the San Jose Earthquakes in extra time.

The Wizards began the 2004 season without Preki, who broke his leg during preseason and replaced with Josh Wolff and Davy Arnaud as starting forwards. The season began with only three wins in the first nine matches, but the Wizards found their form in June and went unbeaten in nine despite playing five consecutive away matches. The team saw their unbeaten streak broken at the end of July before the All-Star Game break, remaining in second place behind the Los Angeles Galaxy in the Western Conference standings. Veteran goalkeeper Tony Meola picked up an injury to his achilles tendon during a pre-game warm-up in August and was replaced by backup goalkeeper Bo Oshoniyi, who would start for the rest of the season. The Wizards also lost starting midfielder Chris Klein to a torn ligament in his knee, while Preki returned only for three matches before being sidelined for an additional ankle surgery.

Kansas City returned from the All-Star break by continuing a four-match winless streak, but finished the season with five wins in the final nine matches to clinch the first seed in the Western Conference. The team's success was credited to a league-leading defense, conceding one goal per game on average, and strong performances from reserve and replacement players under Gansler. The Wizards also won their first U.S. Open Cup title in September by defeating the Chicago Fire 1–0 with a golden goal in extra time. The team were tied with the Columbus Crew in the overall standings with 49 points, but lost the Supporters' Shield on the third tiebreaker, goals scored. Two Wizards players, defender Jimmy Conrad and midfielder Kerry Zavagnin, were named to the MLS Best XI, but Gansler finished as runner-up to Columbus's Greg Andrulis for MLS Coach of the Year.

The Wizards began their playoff campaign in the Western Conference Semifinals against the San Jose Earthquakes, the defending MLS Cup champions. The team fell 2–0 in the first leg of the series in San Jose, conceding goals to Dwayne De Rosario and Craig Waibel near halftime, but Oshoniyi saved further chances from the Earthquakes. The Wizards returned to Arrowhead Stadium and earned a 2–0 lead in the second half to tie the series, with a first-half goal from rookie midfielder Khari Stephenson and an own goal scored on a deflection off Earthquakes forward Brian Ching. In the second minute of stoppage time, Kansas City midfielder Jack Jewsbury scored the winning goal to give his team a 3–2 win on aggregate that would clinch a berth in the Western Conference Final. The Wizards then hosted the Los Angeles Galaxy in the Western Conference Final, repeating similar playoff matchups that the Galaxy won in 1996 and 2002 and lost in 2000; the Galaxy, who were hosting the MLS Cup final, was also winless in four regular season matches against the Wizards in 2004. With a strong defensive performance, Kansas City advanced to their second MLS Cup final on a 2–0 win over Los Angeles; both of the team's goals were scored by Davy Arnaud in the 24th and 69th minutes.

=== Summary of results ===
Note: In all results below, the score of the finalist is given first (H: home; A: away).

D.C. United				Round	Kansas City Wizards			
2nd place in Eastern Conference: Team / Pld / W / L / D / Pts; Columbus Crew (SS) / 30 / 12 / 5 / 13 / 49; D.C. United / 30 / 11 / 10 / 9 / 42; MetroStars / 30 / 11 / 12 / 7 / 40; New England Revolution / 30 / 8 / 13 / 9 / 33; Chicago Fire / 30 / 8 / 13 / 9 / 33; Source: MLS Qualified for playoffs Supporters' Shield winner				Regular season	1st place in Western Conference: Team / Pld / W / L / D / Pts; Kansas City Wizards / 30 / 14 / 9 / 7 / 49; Los Angeles Galaxy / 30 / 11 / 9 / 10 / 43; Colorado Rapids / 30 / 10 / 9 / 11 / 41; San Jose Earthquakes / 30 / 9 / 10 / 11 / 38; Dallas Burn / 30 / 10 / 14 / 6 / 36; Source: MLS Qualified for playoffs			
Opponent	Agg.	1st leg	2nd leg	MLS Cup Playoffs	Opponent	Agg.	1st leg	2nd leg
MetroStars	4–0	2–0 (A)	2–0 (H)	Conference Semifinals	San Jose Earthquakes	3–2	0–2 (A)	3–0 (H)
New England Revolution	3–3 (4–3 p) (H)			Conference Final	Los Angeles Galaxy	2–0 (H)		

== Broadcasting and entertainment ==
The MLS Cup final was televised in the United States on ABC in English, along with a Spanish broadcast using secondary audio programming, both produced by ESPN. English play-by-play commentary was provided by JP Dellacamera with color analysis by Eric Wynalda, reprising their roles in the previous final. Play-by-play commentator Ernesto Motta returned to the Spanish-language broadcast, working alongside color analyst Robert Sierra. The ABC/ESPN broadcast was produced by a team of 85 people and used 20 cameras, including specialized replay and slow-motion cameras. The match was also broadcast in over 175 other countries by ESPN International. Radio coverage of the match was provided by the local teams in English and Radiovisa nationally in Spanish. It was also carried on the American Forces Radio Network internationally. The ABC broadcast earned a Nielsen rating of 0.8 and averaged a local 2.4 rating in the Kansas City metropolitan area—far below the competing Kansas City Chiefs game. The match's halftime show featured San Diego–based alternative rock band Switchfoot and a pyrotechnics display.

== Match ==
=== Summary ===
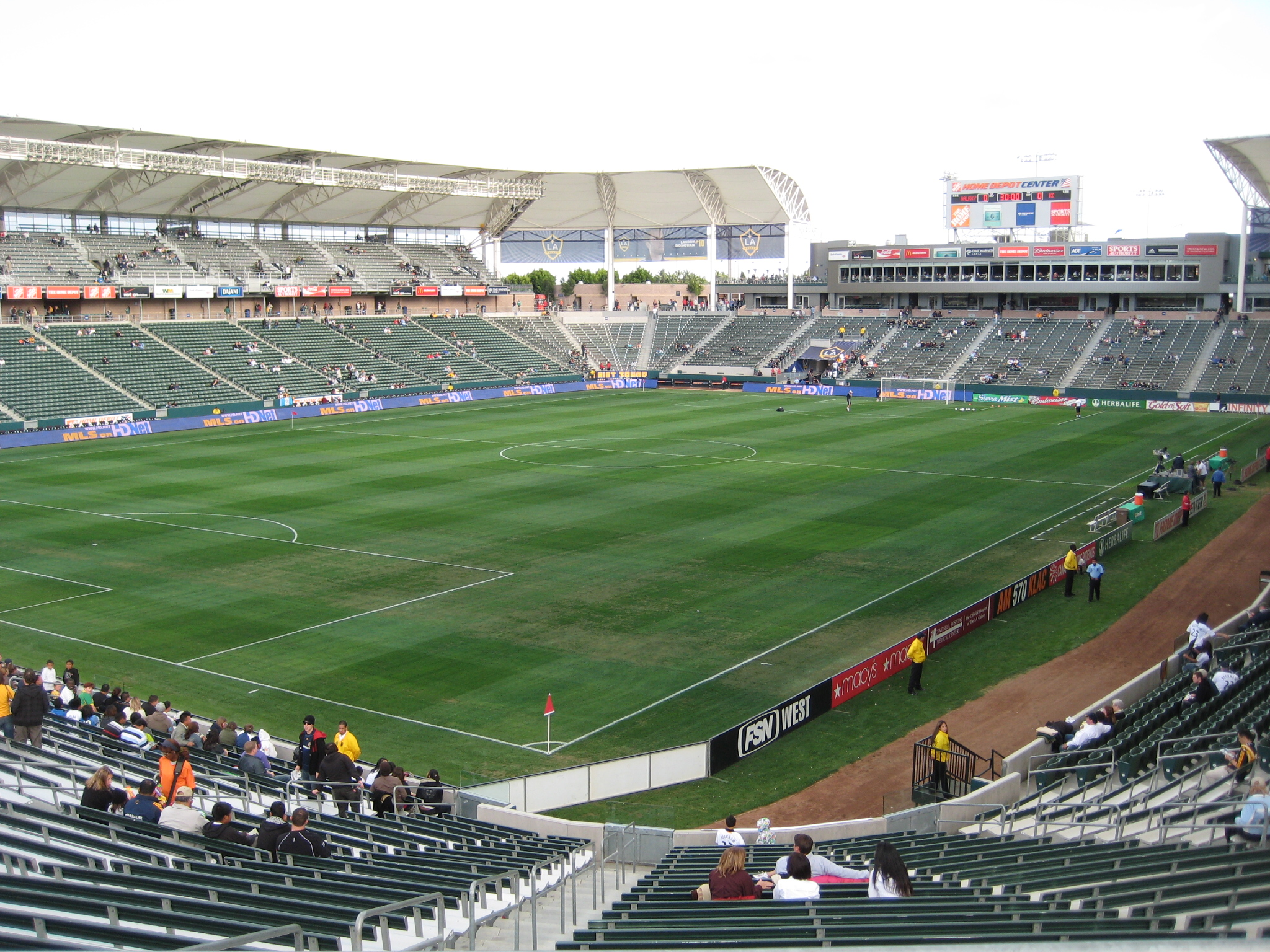
MLS Cup 2004 was hosted at the Home Depot Center in Carson, California, near Los Angeles

The match kicked off at 12:45 p.m. Pacific Time on November 14, 2004, at the Home Depot Center in Carson, California, in front of a crowd of 25,797 spectators—including several hundred traveling D.C. United supporters. At kickoff, the temperature measured 81 °F (27 °C), setting a new record for hottest MLS Cup final. Kansas City took an early lead in the sixth minute after defender José Burciaga Jr. scored on a shot from 30 yards (27 m), following sustained offensive pressure from kickoff.

D.C. United responded with its own offensive pressure and scored three goals within seven minutes to take a 3–1 lead by the 30th minute of play. Alecko Eskandarian scored D.C.'s first two goals, first receiving a pass from Brian Carroll and turning around defender Nick Garcia to score from 14 yards (13 m) in the 19th minute. Four minutes later, Eskandarian stole the ball from a Wizards throw-in meant for defender Jimmy Conrad and scored on a left-footed shot from 18 yards (16 m) for a 2–1 lead; during the run-up to the goal, Eskandarian used his forearm to block the ball, but it was not called by referee Michael Kennedy despite protests from Kansas City players and coaches. D.C. United extended their lead to 3–1 in the 26th minute after Wizards defender Alex Zotinca scored an own goal by deflecting a cross from Earnie Stewart into the goal with his chest.

D.C. remained ahead by two goals at halftime, but Kansas City began the second half with an offensive push along the wings to narrow the lead. Burciaga Jr. took a corner kick for the Wizards in the 56th minute that was headed towards goal by Conrad, who led the team with four shots, but it was blocked by Eskandarian on the goal line and deflected away by goalkeeper Nick Rimando. The ball returned to Conrad, who took a short, volleyed shot towards the goal that hit the hand of D.C. midfielder Dema Kovalenko. After the referee and an assistant discussed the play, Kansas City were awarded a penalty kick and Kovalenko received the first red card in MLS Cup history for his handball.

The resulting penalty kick was scored in the 58th minute by Josh Wolff, but the Wizards failed to find an equalizing goal with their one-man advantage. Manager Bob Gansler made two substitutions to bring on attacking players, but the team failed to capitalize on chances given to Burciaga in the 81st minute and Matt Taylor in stoppage time. Nowak responded by making several defensive substitutions for D.C., also bringing on Freddy Adu in the 65th minute for Eskandarian, who suffered a leg injury, as the team held onto their lead to win the match 3–2 and clinch an MLS Cup.

=== Details ===
November 14, 2004
12:30 PST

D.C. United	3–2	Kansas City Wizards
Eskandarian 19', 23'; Zotinca 26' (o.g.)	Report	Burciaga 6'; Wolff 58' (pen.)

The Home Depot Center, Carson, California
Attendance: 25,797
Referee: Michael Kennedy

D.C. UNITED:
GK	18	(United States) Nick Rimando
DF	26	(United States) Bryan Namoff	(yellow card) 72'
DF	7	(New Zealand) Ryan Nelsen (c)
DF	12	(United States) Mike Petke
MF	8	(United States) Earnie Stewart	(yellow card) 55'	(substituted off) 82'
MF	16	(United States) Brian Carroll
MF	14	(United States) Ben Olsen	(yellow card) 89'
MF	21	(Ukraine) Dema Kovalenko	(red card) 57'
MF	13	(Argentina) Christian Gomez		(substituted off) 59'
FW	99	(Bolivia) Jaime Moreno
FW	11	(United States) Alecko Eskandarian		(substituted off) 65'
Substitutions:
GK	22	(United States) Troy Perkins
DF	2	(United States) David Stokes
DF	4	(United States) Brandon Prideaux		(substituted on) 82'
DF	5	(Saint Vincent and the Grenadines) Ezra Hendrickson
MF	9	(United States) Freddy Adu		(substituted on) 65'
MF	17	(United States) Joshua Gros		(substituted on) 59'
MF	27	(United States) Tim Lawson
FW	25	(United States) Santino Quaranta
FW	3	(United States) Jason Thompson
Head Coach:
(United States) Peter Nowak

KANSAS CITY WIZARDS:
GK	25	(United States) Bo Oshoniyi
DF	12	(United States) Jimmy Conrad
DF	3	(United States) Nick Garcia
DF	23	(Romania) Alex Zotinca		(substituted off) 82'
DF	6	(United States) José Burciaga Jr.
MF	5	(United States) Kerry Zavagnin
MF	7	(United States) Diego Gutiérrez (c)	(yellow card) 33'
MF	14	(United States) Jack Jewsbury		(substituted off) 66'
MF	24	(Jamaica) Khari Stephenson		(substituted off) 45'
FW	22	(United States) Davy Arnaud
FW	15	(United States) Josh Wolff
Substitutions:
GK	1	(United States) Tony Meola
GK	30	(United States) Will Hesmer
DF	4	(Jamaica) Shavar Thomas
DF	26	(United States) Taylor Graham
MF	8	(Brazil) Diego Walsh		(substituted on) 82'
MF	10	(United States) Francisco Gomez
MF	20	(Russia) Igor Simutenkov		(substituted on) 45'
FW	19	(United States) Matt Taylor		(substituted on) 66'
FW	27	(United States) Justin Detter
Head Coach:
(United States) Bob Gansler

MLS Cup Most Valuable Player:
(United States) Alecko Eskandarian (D.C. United)

Assistant referees:
Nathan Clement
Kermit Quisenberry
Fourth official:
Abiodun Okulaja

== Post-match ==
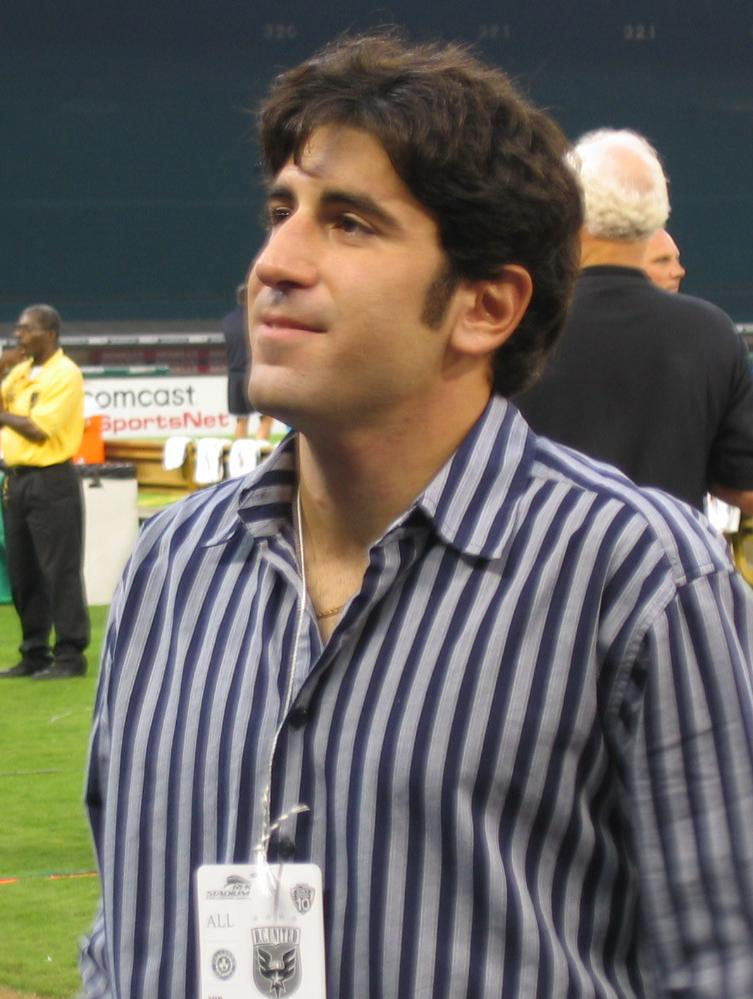
D.C. United forward Alecko Eskandarian was named the MLS Cup MVP for his two goals in the final

D.C. United won its fourth MLS Cup championship and its first since 1999, solidifying its place as the most successful sports franchise in Washington, D.C. Peter Nowak became the first person to win the MLS Cup as both a player and as a head coach, as well as the first coach without American or Canadian citizenship to win the title. He was the MLS Cup MVP during the Chicago Fire's 1998 victory against D.C. United and also played in their loss to Kansas City in 2000. Josh Wolff, who scored Kansas City's second goal in the 2004 cup, was a teammate of Nowawk's and played in the 2000 cup. 15-year-old substitute Freddy Adu became the youngest member of an American professional championship team in modern sports history, beating a record set by 18-year-old baseball pitcher Art Houtteman with the Detroit Tigers in 1945.

Eskandarian was named the match's MVP for his two goals, capping a season of redemption after spending his rookie year on the bench. After the match, he stated, "I didn't even know where the ball hit me. It was just what you learn in youth soccer; you keep going until you hear a whistle." In 2011, Eskandarian publicly acknowledged that there was a handball on the play that led to his second goal in a Twitter roast of retiring defender Jimmy Conrad. Wizards head coach Bob Gansler complimented United's defensive performance and lamented his team's defensive errors that lead to the three conceded goals.

Both finalists qualified for the 2005 CONCACAF Champions' Cup and were placed in the quarterfinals, which were played during the MLS preseason in early March. Kansas City tied Deportivo Saprissa in its home leg, but were eliminated by losing 2–1 after extra time the following week in San José, Costa Rica. D.C. played against Harbour View of Jamaica and advanced from the quarterfinals with a 4–2 aggregate score. In the semifinals, they played against Mexican champions UNAM Pumas and drew 1–1 in the home leg, but were eliminated after losing 5–0 in Mexico City.
