= 2004 Major League Soccer season =

9th season of Major League Soccer

- Season: 2004
- Teams: 10
- MLS Cup: D.C. United (4th title)
- Supporters' Shield: Columbus Crew (1st shield)
- 2005 CONCACAF Champions' Cup: D.C. United; Kansas City Wizards
- Matches: 150
- Goals: 392 (2.61 per match)
- Top goalscorer: Brian Ching; San Jose Earthquakes Goals: 12; Eddie Johnson; Dallas Burn; Goals: 12
- Biggest home win: NE 6–1 COL
- Biggest away win: LA 0–3 NY; DAL 0–3 NE; CHI 0–3 COL
- Highest scoring: SJ 5–5 NY
- Longest winning run: Columbus Crew; Games: 4 (05/15 – 06/06); Columbus Crew; Games: 4 (09/04 – 09/25)
- Longest unbeaten run: Columbus Crew; Games: 18 (07/03/2004)
- Longest losing run: Dallas Burn; Games: 4 (05/08 – 05/29)
- Highest attendance: Los Angeles Galaxy; Season: 357,137; Game Avg.: 23,809
- Lowest attendance: Dallas Burn; Season: 136,319; Game Avg.: 9,088
- Total attendance: 2,333,797
- Average attendance: 15,559

Locations of teams for the 2004 Major League Soccer season
Western Conference Eastern Conference

The 2004 Major League Soccer season was the ninth season of Major League Soccer. It was also the 92nd season of FIFA-sanctioned soccer in the United States, and the 26th with a national first-division league.

After playing one season in the suburb of Southlake, the Dallas Burn returned to the Cotton Bowl.

D.C. United signed 14-year-old prodigy Freddy Adu, who made his debut as a substitute in their season opener becoming the youngest player in North American sports history. The Columbus Crew emerged as a dominant team in the second half of the regular season, running off an MLS-record 18-game unbeaten streak en route to winning the Supporters' Shield.

The regular season began on April 3, and concluded on October 17. The 2004 MLS Cup Playoffs began on October 22, and concluded with MLS Cup 2004 on November 14. D.C. United won their record 4th league title by defeating the Kansas City Wizards in MLS Cup.

== Overview ==
=== Season format ===
The season began on April 3 and concluded with MLS Cup on November 14. The 10 teams were split evenly into two conferences. Each team played 30 games that were evenly divided between home and away. Each team played every other team in their conference, and two designated opponents from the opposite conference, four times, and the remaining teams in the opposite conference twice.

The top four teams from each conference qualified for the MLS Cup Playoffs. In the first round, aggregate goals over two matches determined the winners. The conference finals were played as a single match, and the winners advanced to MLS Cup. In all rounds, draws were broken with two 15-minute periods of extra time, followed by penalty kicks if necessary. The away goals rule was not used in any round.

The team with the most points in the regular season was awarded the MLS Supporters' Shield. Additionally, the winner of MLS Cup and the runner-up qualified for the CONCACAF Champions' Cup.

=== Stadiums and locations ===
Team	Stadium	Capacity
Chicago Fire	Soldier Field	61,500
Colorado Rapids	Invesco Field at Mile High	76,125
Columbus Crew	Columbus Crew Stadium	22,555
D.C. United	RFK Stadium	46,000
Dallas Burn	Cotton Bowl	92,100
Kansas City Wizards	Arrowhead Stadium	81,425
Los Angeles Galaxy	Home Depot Center	27,000
MetroStars	Giants Stadium	80,200
New England Revolution	Gillette Stadium	68,756
San Jose Earthquakes	Spartan Stadium	30,456

=== Personnel and sponsorships ===
Team	Head coach	Captain	Manufacturer	Shirt sponsor
Chicago Fire	(United States) Dave Sarachan		Puma	Honda
Colorado Rapids	(United States) Tim Hankinson		Atletica	—
Columbus Crew	(United States) Greg Andrulis	(United States) Robin Fraser	Adidas	Sierra Mist
D.C. United	(Poland) Piotr Nowak		Adidas	—
Dallas Burn	(Northern Ireland) Colin Clarke		Atletica	RadioShack
Kansas City Wizards	(United States) Bob Gansler		Adidas	U.S. Soccer Foundation
Los Angeles Galaxy	(United States) Steve Sampson		Nike	Budweiser
MetroStars	(United States) Bob Bradley	(United States) Eddie Pope	Nike	—
New England Revolution	(Scotland) Steve Nicol		Reebok	Sierra Mist
San Jose Earthquakes	(United States) Dominic Kinnear	(United States) Jeff Agoos	Nike	Yahoo! en Español

=== Coaching changes ===
Team	Outgoing coach	Manner of departure	Date of vacancy	Incoming coach	Date of appointment
Los Angeles Galaxy	(United States) Sigi Schmid	Fired	August 16, 2004	(United States) Steve Sampson	August 18, 2004

== Standings ==
=== Eastern Conference ===
Pos	Team	Pld	W	L	T	GF	GA	GD	Pts	Qualification
1	Columbus Crew	30	12	5	13	40	32	+8	49	MLS Cup Playoffs
2	D.C. United	30	11	10	9	43	42	+1	42	MLS Cup Playoffs
3	MetroStars	30	11	12	7	47	49	−2	40	MLS Cup Playoffs
4	New England Revolution	30	8	13	9	42	43	−1	33	MLS Cup Playoffs
5	Chicago Fire	30	8	13	9	36	44	−8	33	

Source: MLS

=== Western Conference ===
Pos	Team	Pld	W	L	T	GF	GA	GD	Pts	Qualification
1	Kansas City Wizards	30	14	9	7	38	30	+8	49	MLS Cup Playoffs
2	Los Angeles Galaxy	30	11	9	10	42	40	+2	43	MLS Cup Playoffs
3	Colorado Rapids	30	10	9	11	29	32	−3	41	MLS Cup Playoffs
4	San Jose Earthquakes	30	9	10	11	41	35	+6	38	MLS Cup Playoffs
5	Dallas Burn	30	10	14	6	34	45	−11	36	

Source: MLS

=== Overall standings ===
Pos	Team	Pld	W	L	T	GF	GA	GD	Pts	
1	Columbus Crew (S)	30	12	5	13	40	32	+8	49	
2	Kansas City Wizards	30	14	9	7	38	30	+8	49	Qualification for the CONCACAF Champions' Cup
3	Los Angeles Galaxy	30	11	9	10	42	40	+2	43	
4	D.C. United (C)	30	11	10	9	43	42	+1	42	Qualification for the CONCACAF Champions' Cup
5	Colorado Rapids	30	10	9	11	29	32	−3	41	
6	MetroStars	30	11	12	7	47	49	−2	40	
7	San Jose Earthquakes	30	9	10	11	41	35	+6	38	
8	Dallas Burn	30	10	14	6	34	45	−11	36	
9	New England Revolution	30	8	13	9	42	43	−1	33	
10	Chicago Fire	30	8	13	9	36	44	−8	33	

Source: MLS
Rules for classification: 1) points; 2) head-to-head record; 3) goal difference; 4) number of goals scored
(C) MLS Cup champions; (S) Supporters' Shield winners

== MLS Cup playoffs ==
=== Bracket ===
Conference semifinals
E1	Columbus	0	1
E4	New England (wins 2–1 agg.)	1	1
Eastern Conference
E2	D.C. United (wins 4–0 agg.)	2	2
E3	MetroStars	0	0
W1	Kansas City (wins 3–2 agg.)	0	3
W4	San Jose	2	0
Western Conference
W2	Los Angeles (wins 2–1 agg.)	0	2
W3	Colorado	1	0

Conference finals
E4	New England	3
E2	D.C. United (wins 4–3 on PK's)	3*
W1	Kansas City	2
W2	Los Angeles	0

MLS Cup
E2	D.C. United	3
W1	Kansas City	2

=== Conference semifinals ===
October 23, 2004

Columbus Crew	0–1	New England Revolution
	Report	John 25'

Gillette Stadium
Foxborough, Massachusetts
Attendance: 5,679
Referee: N/A
October 31, 2004

New England Revolution	1–1	Columbus Crew
Twellman 81'	Report	Buddle 90+2'

Crew Stadium
Columbus, Ohio
Attendance: 15,224
Referee: Alex Prus

New England Revolution advance 2–1 on aggregate.

October 23, 2004

D.C. United	2–0	MetroStars
Stewart 67'; Eskandarian 88'	Report

Giants Stadium
East Rutherford, New Jersey
Attendance: 11,161
Referee: Kevin Stott
October 30, 2004

MetroStars	0–2	D.C. United
	Report	Moreno 85'; Namoff 89'

RFK Stadium
Washington, D.C.
Attendance: 15,763
Referee: Ricardo Valenzuela

D.C. United advance 4–0 on aggregate.

October 24, 2004

Kansas City Wizards	0–2	San Jose Earthquakes
	Report	De Rosario 40'; Waibel 52'

Spartan Stadium
San Jose, California
Attendance: 8,659
Referee: Kevin Terry
October 30, 2004

San Jose Earthquakes	0–3	Kansas City Wizards
	Report	Stephenson 26'; Ching 48' (o.g.); Jewsbury 90+2'

Arrowhead Stadium
Kansas City, Missouri
Attendance: 10,022
Referee: Terry Vaughn

Kansas City Wizards advance 3–2 on aggregate.

October 22, 2004

Los Angeles Galaxy	0–1	Colorado Rapids
	Report	Peguero 30'

INVESCO Field at Mile High
Denver, Colorado
Attendance: 8,028
Referee: Terry Vaughn
October 30, 2004

Colorado Rapids	0–2	Los Angeles Galaxy
	Report	Ruiz 30'; Marshall 45+3'

Home Depot Center
Carson, California
Attendance: 20,026
Referee: Michael Kennedy

Los Angeles Galaxy advance 2–1 on aggregate.

=== Conference finals ===
November 5, 2004

Los Angeles Galaxy	0–2	Kansas City Wizards
	Report	Arnaud 24', 68'

Arrowhead Stadium
Kansas City, Missouri
Attendance: 11,931
Referee: Abiodun Okulaja

November 6, 2004

New England Revolution	3–3 (AET)	D.C. United
Twellman 17'; Ralston 44' (pen.); Noonan 85'	Report	Eskandarian 11'; Moreno 21'; Gomez 67'
Penalties
Ralston (penalty missed); Reis (penalty scored); Twellman (penalty scored); Heaps (penalty missed); Joseph (penalty scored); Dempsey (penalty missed)	3–4	(penalty missed) Olsen; (penalty scored) Quaranta; (penalty scored) Adu; (penalty scored) Eskandarian; (penalty missed) Moreno; (penalty scored) Carroll

RFK Stadium
Washington, D.C.
Attendance: 21,201
Referee: Terry Vaughn

D.C. United advance 4–3 on penalties (3–3 after full time).

=== MLS Cup ===
November 14, 2004

Kansas City Wizards	2–3	D.C. United
Burciaga Jr. 6'; Wolff 58' (pen.)	Report	Eskandarian 19' 23'; Zotinca 26' (o.g.); Kovalenko (red card) 57'

Home Depot Center
Carson, California
Attendance: 25,797
Referee: Michael Kennedy

== Player statistics ==
=== Goals ===
Rank	Player	Club	Goals
1	(United States) Brian Ching	San Jose Earthquakes	12
1	(United States) Eddie Johnson	Dallas Burn	12
3	(United States) Edson Buddle	Columbus Crew	11
3	(United States) Pat Noonan	New England Revolution	11
3	(Jamaica) Damani Ralph	Chicago Fire	11
3	(Guatemala) Carlos Ruiz	Los Angeles Galaxy	11
7	(United States) Alecko Eskandarian	D.C. United	10
7	(Honduras) Amado Guevara	MetroStars	10
7	(United States) Josh Wolff	Kansas City Wizards	10
7	(United States) John Wolyniec	MetroStars	10

=== Assists ===
Rank	Player	Club	Assists
1	(Uruguay) José Cancela	New England Revolution	8
1	(New Zealand) Simon Elliott	Columbus Crew	8
1	(Honduras) Amado Guevara	MetroStars	8
4	(United States) Landon Donovan	San Jose Earthquakes	7
5	(Austria) Andreas Herzog	Los Angeles Galaxy	6
5	(United States) Chris Klein	Kansas City Wizards	6
5	(Ukraine) Dema Kovalenko	D.C. United	6
5	(Bolivia) Jaime Moreno	D.C. United	6
5	(United States) Richard Mulrooney	San Jose Earthquakes	6
5	(Republic of Ireland) Ronnie O'Brien	Dallas Burn	6
5	(Jamaica) Andy Williams	Chicago Fire	6

=== Clean sheets ===
Rank	Player	Club	Clean sheets
1	(United States) Jon Busch	Columbus Crew	10
1	(United States) Joe Cannon	Colorado Rapids	10
3	(United States) Kevin Hartman	Los Angeles Galaxy	7
3	(United States) Tony Meola	Kansas City Wizards	7
3	(United States) Henry Ring	Chicago Fire	7
6	(Canada) Pat Onstad	San Jose Earthquakes	6
7	(United States) Bo Oshoniyi	Kansas City Wizards	5
7	(United States) Jonny Walker	MetroStars	5
9	(United States) Jeff Cassar	Dallas Burn	4
9	(United States) Scott Garlick	Dallas Burn	4
9	(United States) Nick Rimando	D.C. United	4

== Awards ==
=== Individual awards ===
Award	Player	Club
Most Valuable Player	(Honduras) Amado Guevara	MetroStars
Defender of the Year	(United States) Robin Fraser	Columbus Crew
Goalkeeper of the Year	(United States) Joe Cannon	Colorado Rapids
Coach of the Year	(United States) Greg Andrulis	Columbus Crew
Rookie of the Year	(United States) Clint Dempsey	New England Revolution
Comeback Player of the Year	(United States) Brian Ching	San Jose Earthquakes
Scoring Champion	(Honduras) Amado Guevara (United States) Pat Noonan	MetroStars; New England Revolution
Goal of the Year	(Canada) Dwayne De Rosario	San Jose Earthquakes
Fair Play Award	(United States) Eddie Pope	MetroStars
Humanitarian of the Year	(United States) Chris Henderson	Colorado Rapids

=== Best XI ===
Goalkeeper	Defenders	Midfielders	Forwards
(United States) Joe Cannon, Colorado	(United States) Jimmy Conrad, Kansas City (United States) Robin Fraser, Columbus (New Zealand) Ryan Nelsen, D.C. United (United States) Eddie Pope, MetroStars	(United States) Eddie Gaven, MetroStars (Honduras) Amado Guevara, MetroStars (Republic of Ireland) Ronnie O'Brien, Dallas (United States) Kerry Zavagnin, Kansas City	(United States) Brian Ching, San Jose (Bolivia) Jaime Moreno, D.C. United

== Attendance ==
Club	Games	Total	Average
Los Angeles Galaxy	15	357,137	23,809
D.C. United	15	258,484	17,232
MetroStars	15	257,923	17,195
Chicago Fire	15	257,295	17,153
Columbus Crew	15	253,079	16,872
Kansas City Wizards	15	222,235	14,816
Colorado Rapids	15	212,925	14,195
San Jose Earthquakes	15	195,015	13,001
New England Revolution	15	183,385	12,226
Dallas Burn	15	136,319	9,088
Totals	150	2,333,797	15,559
