= Wizards Futbol Club =

Wizards Futbol Club establish in 2002, a youth soccer academy founded by Jose Burciaga Jr. in Dallas, TX.

Wizards FC is a community based not for profit organization designed to provide a high level of training and development that will prepare all players for college and beyond.

In Dallas Cup 2014: Wizards FC had two teams participating on the most competitive soccer event in the US and most recognized youth soccer in the world! With one team going to Finals.

== Partnership ==
August 4, 2014 – Wolverhampton Wanderers of England have agreed to a partnership with Wizards FC. Wizards FC coaches and players will have the opportunity to work with the academy coaches of Wolves in both North America and England, offering an insight into the player development program of one of the top English soccer academies. The partnership will provide players and coaches unparalleled access to a club renowned for producing world class players.

The partnership will see the Wolves North American Academy hosting a series of Elite Player ID events with Wizards FC. Wolves will send Academy staff members over to work with Wizards FC players at these events. The best male and female players at these events will be invited to attend the Wolves National Camp. The National Camp will host the top players from each of our partner clubs in North America. From the National Camp, the top players will be invited to attend the Elite Player Tour at our Academy in Wolverhampton, England.

Jose Luis Burciaga Jr.- “We are excited about our new partnership with the Wolves and we are looking forward to working together to help develop our young players to become the next generation of soccer players. Thank you to Global Image Sports for thinking about our club, and thank you Wolves for the opportunity.”
