= MLS Humanitarian of the Year Award =

The MLS Humanitarian of the Year Award, also known as the MLS W.O.R.K.S Humanitarian of the Year Award, is given to a Major League Soccer player who exemplifies both skill on the field and service within the community. This finalists of the award are nominated by their respective teams, then the winner is voted on by the media, players, and club representatives.

== Winners ==
Season	Player	Team
2000	(Sierra Leone) Abdul Thompson Conteh	San Jose Earthquakes
2001	(United States) Tim Howard	MetroStars
2002	(United States) Steve Jolley	MetroStars
2003	(United States) Ben Olsen	D.C. United
2004	(United States) Chris Henderson	Colorado Rapids
2005	(United States) Brian Kamler	Real Salt Lake
2006	(United States) Michael Parkhurst	New England Revolution
2007	(United States) Diego Gutiérrez	Chicago Fire
2008	(United States) José Burciaga Jr.	Colorado Rapids
2009	(United States) Jimmy Conrad	Kansas City Wizards
2009	(United States) Logan Pause	Chicago Fire
2010	(United States) Seth Stammler	New York Red Bulls
2011	(United States) Zak Boggs	New England Revolution
2012	(United States) Chris Seitz	FC Dallas
2013	(United States) Matt Reis	New England Revolution
2014	(Guam) A. J. DeLaGarza	LA Galaxy
2015	(Sierra Leone) Kei Kamara	Columbus Crew SC
2016	(United States) Matt Lampson	Chicago Fire
2017	(United States) Ryan Hollingshead	FC Dallas
2018	(United States) Matt Lampson (2)	Minnesota United FC
2019	(United States) Matt Lampson (3)	LA Galaxy
2020	Black Players for Change	Various
2021	(United States) Justin Morrow	Toronto FC
2022	(United States) Alejandro Bedoya	Philadelphia Union
2023	(United States) Alejandro Bedoya (2)	Philadelphia Union
