= Davy Arnaud =

American soccer player (born 1980)

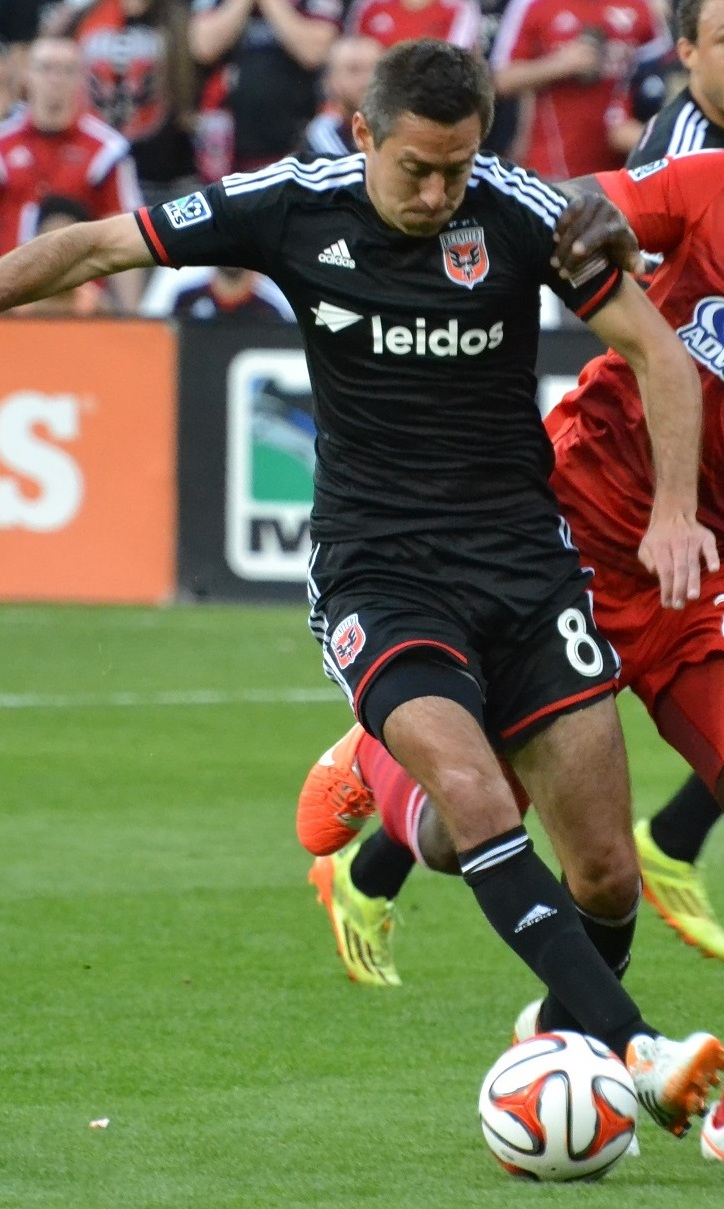
- Arnaud playing for D.C. United

Personal information
- Date of birth: June 22, 1980 (age 46)
- Place of birth: Nederland, Texas, U.S.
- Height: 6 ft 0 in (1.83 m)
- Position: Midfielder

Team information
- Current team: Austin FC (assistant coach)

College career
Years	Team	Apps	(Gls)
1999–2001	West Texas A&M Buffaloes		

Senior career*
Years	Team	Apps	(Gls)
2002–2011	Sporting Kansas City (Note: Formerly known as Kansas City Wizards through 2010.)	240	(43)
2012–2013	Montreal Impact	57	(5)
2014–2015	D.C. United	54	(2)
Total		351	(50)

International career^{‡}
2007–2009	United States	7	(1)

Managerial career
- 2016: D.C. United (assistant)
- 2017–2019: Houston Dynamo (assistant)
- 2019: Houston Dynamo (interim)
- 2021–: Austin FC (assistant)
- 2024: Austin FC (interim)
- 2026: Austin FC (interim)
Medal record
Representing United States
Runner-up	CONCACAF Gold Cup	2009
Men's Soccer
- * Club domestic league appearances and goals as of September 13, 2015 ‡ National team caps and goals as of July 26, 2009

Davy Arnaud (/ˈɑːrnoʊ/; born June 22, 1980) is an American soccer coach and former player. During his professional career, he played for Sporting Kansas City, Montreal Impact, and D.C. United, and served on the coaching staff of D.C. United and Houston Dynamo. Arnaud also made seven appearances for the United States national team, scoring one goal. He is currently an assistant coach at Austin FC.

== Career ==
=== College ===
Arnaud played college soccer at West Texas A&M University from 1999 to 2001, finishing his career with 31 goals and 11 assists. In his junior year he scored 13 goals and 3 assists, becoming a Division II NCAA All-American, the first from his school.

=== Professional ===
After his junior year, Arnaud turned professional, and was drafted 50th overall in the 2002 MLS SuperDraft by the Kansas City Wizards. He hardly played at all his first year, registering only 43 minutes in three games. Although his second year began much the same, Arnaud began to get significant time as the year progressed, and finished the year having played in 18 games, and scored three goals. Although his performance in 2003 boded well for his 2004 season, Arnaud exceeded everybody's expectations. After Preki and Igor Simutenkov went down with long-term injuries before the beginning of the season, Arnaud was given a starting role in the Wizards' offense next to Josh Wolff. Arnaud proved he deserved the opportunity from the outset, and went on to start all 30 of Kansas City's games, scoring nine goals and eight assists while leading the club to first place in the Western Conference.

Arnaud remained a starter for the club for the next several years. Before the 2010 season, Arnaud was named the team's new captain by coach Peter Vermes. During the 2011 season injuries limited his play but he still remained a key player for the club helping Sporting to a first place Eastern Conference finish during the regular season.

On November 28, 2011, Arnaud was traded to new expansion team Montreal Impact for defender Seth Sinovic and allocation money. He was named captain of the Montreal Impact for the team's first season in Major League Soccer. On March 17, 2012, before a crowd of 58,912 at Olympic Stadium in Montreal, Arnaud scored the first ever goal for the Montreal Impact in MLS in the 56th minute by heading a cross from Sanna Nyassi into the top right corner against Chicago Fire keeper Paolo Tornaghi.

On December 10, 2013, Arnaud was traded to D.C. United in exchange for an international roster slot.

On March 3, 2016, Arnaud officially announced his retirement. In his professional career he played 351 games, scored 50 goals, and recorded 46 assists.

=== Coaching ===
Upon retirement from playing, Arnaud immediately joined the D.C. United's coaching staff as an assistant coach.

Arnaud joined the Houston Dynamo in late 2016 as an assistant coach, joining Wilmer Cabrera back in his native Texas. Upon Cabrera's departure from the club after a 9–13–3 start to the 2019 season, Arnaud was elevated to the role of interim head coach. Arnaud went 3–5–1 in the interim role before Tab Ramos was named permanent head coach.

On July 13, 2020, Arnaud was named assistant coach for Austin FC, joining Josh Wolff's staff for the expansion club's inaugural campaign.

=== International ===
Arnaud made his first appearance for the United States national team as a late substitute during the U.S.'s 4–2 friendly defeat against Brazil on September 9, 2007, at Soldier Field in Chicago. He scored his first international goal on July 11, 2009, against Haiti in the 2009 CONCACAF Gold Cup at Gillette Stadium in Foxboro, Massachusetts.

=== International goals ===
#	Date	Venue	Opponent	Score	Result	Competition
01.	July 11, 2009	Gillette Stadium, Foxborough, United States	Haiti	1–0	2–2	2009 CONCACAF Gold Cup

== Honors ==
Kansas City Wizards

- U.S. Open Cup: 2004
- MLS Western Conference: 2004

Montreal Impact

- Canadian Championship: 2013

Individual

- Sporting Legends (Club Hall of Fame): 2022

== Notes ==
Sporting positions
Preceded by Jimmy Conrad	Kansas City Wizards/ Sporting Kansas City captain 2010–2011	Succeeded by Jimmy Nielsen
