= Alecko Eskandarian =

American retired soccer player

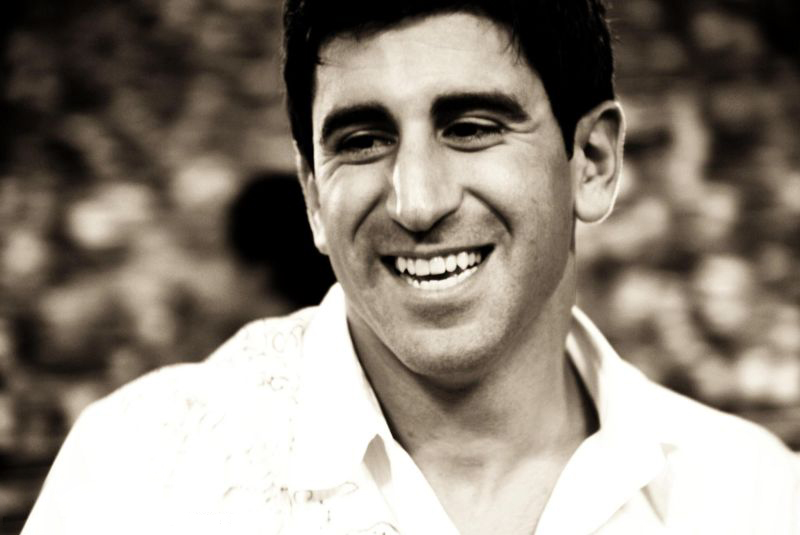
- Eskandarian in 2009

Personal information
- Full name: Alecko Eskandarian
- Date of birth: July 9, 1982 (age 44)
- Place of birth: Montvale, New Jersey, U.S.
- Height: 5 ft 9 in (1.75 m)
- Position: Forward

College career
Years	Team	Apps	(Gls)
2000–2002	Virginia Cavaliers	60	(50)

Senior career*
Years	Team	Apps	(Gls)
2003–2006	D.C. United	81	(20)
2007	Toronto FC	6	(1)
2007	Real Salt Lake	17	(1)
2008–2009	Chivas USA	18	(6)
2009–2010	Los Angeles Galaxy	3	(2)
Total		125	(30)

International career
1999	United States U17		
2000–2001	United States U20		
2002–2003	United States U23		
2003	United States	1	(0)

Managerial career
- 2012: Philadelphia Union (assistant)
- 2013: New York Cosmos (assistant)
- 2015–2016: New York Cosmos B
- * Club domestic league appearances and goals

Alecko Eskandarian (Armenian: Ալեքկո Էսկանդարյան, Persian: آلککو اسکندریان) (born July 9, 1982) is an American retired soccer player. A 2004 and 2006 MLS All-Star, Eskandarian notably scored two goals in the 2004 MLS Cup where he was named the match MVP after helping to win the championship for D.C. United. The son of Andranik Eskandarian, a former player of the Iranian national team and the Taj team, Alecko Eskandarian represented the United States in their youth and senior national teams. He is a former assistant coach for New York Cosmos and head coach for their reserve team, New York Cosmos B.

== Career ==
=== High School and College ===
While at Bergen Catholic High School, Eskandarian won the 1999-00 Gatorade National High School Athlete of the Year Award. He was also named a NSCAA/Adidas All-American and New Jersey State Player of the Year after leading the state of New Jersey in scoring with 66 goals and 15 assists through 25 games during his senior year. He finished his high school career with 154 career goals, the most in Bergen County history and the third most in New Jersey high school history.

Prior to playing as a professional, he played three years of soccer for the University of Virginia where he was named the best player in college soccer and awarded the Hermann Trophy in 2002 after scoring 25 goals (a school record) and 4 assists for the Cavaliers. He played three standout seasons at the University of Virginia and established himself as one of the all-time greats at the school. He finished his Cavaliers career with 50 goals (including 15 game winners), 113 points, and 13 assists in 60 games, before foregoing his senior year to go pro. During his 3 seasons at UVA, Eskandarian was a 3-time All-American, 1st Team All-ACC, ACC Rookie of the Year in 2000, and was also named ACC Player of the Year and Soccer America's College Player of the Year in 2002. Eskandarian returned to the university during the 2010 season to finish his degree and take an assistant coaching job with the team.

=== Professional ===
Eskandarian played his first four MLS seasons for D.C. United, who drafted him #1 overall in the 2003 MLS Superdraft. During his first season he recorded three goals and two assists in 23 games. In the 2004 season, after the replacement of coach Ray Hudson with Peter Nowak, Eskandarian saw significantly more playing time. In his sophomore campaign, Eskandarian led D.C. United in goal scoring with ten in the regular season and added two assists, while scoring 4 more goals in the playoffs as DC United won the 2004 MLS Cup. His strong play also earned him the D.C. United Coaches Award for 2004 and his first spot on the MLS All-Star team.

On November 14, 2004, Eskandarian played in his first MLS Cup game. He helped D.C. United defeat the Kansas City Wizards and win the championship by scoring two goals in the first half just four minutes apart — the fastest pair of goals in MLS Cup history — and was named the MLS Cup MVP. In 2005, Alecko's season ended early after suffering a concussion. After missing most of 2005 with post-concussion syndrome, Eskandarian wasted no time in making his mark on the 2006 season, scoring against New York in the season opener. In 22 games for D.C. United, Eskandarian recorded seven goals and two assists, including Goal of the Week honors on 5/13 for his tally against KC. His impressive return to form netted Eskandarian a Commissioner's Pick as an MLS All-Star, his second nod to the league's showcase event. On August 9, 2006, during the 2006 Summer Tour of Real Madrid, he scored DC United's only goal in a 1–1 draw with Real Madrid.

On December 22, 2006, Eskandarian was traded from D.C. United to Toronto FC for a partial allocation. On May 22, 2007, Eskandarian was traded from Toronto FC to Real Salt Lake in exchange for forward Jeff Cunningham. Between Real Salt Lake and Toronto, Eskandarian played 23 games (starting all 23), scoring 2 goals and adding 3 assists, logging 1,913 minutes.

Chivas USA acquired Eskandarian from Real Salt Lake in exchange for salary cap allocation money. This move was announced on January 18, 2008, at the 2008 MLS SuperDraft. In 2008, after missing much of the first half of the season due to surgery on a torn adductor, Eskandarian came on strong late in the year and finished the season tied for first on the team with five goals and two assists in just 8 starts. In a span between Aug 30 and Oct 4, he scored a goal against each of his three previous teams (RSL, Toronto, and DC).

Eskandarian was traded to city rivals Los Angeles Galaxy on July 1, 2009. Chivas USA received allocation money and a third round pick in the 2010 MLS SuperDraft in return. He scored in his debut for the Galaxy on July 4, 2009. The goal was a game winner as Los Angeles beat New England 1–0. Eskandarian scored again in a 3–1 win at New York on July 16, a goal which was nominated for MLS Goal of the Year. However, the 27-year-old was injured early in the second half of the Galaxy's 2–2 draw with AC Milan on July 19 when the ball was inadvertently cleared into his face, causing a concussion and broken nose.

Due to injury, Alecko was not medically cleared and has been sidelined indefinitely since March 2010. He was the assistant coach for the Virginia Cavaliers soccer club. On June 15, 2011, it was announced that Eskandarian had joined Philadelphia Union's technical staff as their youth technical director under the direction of the program's coach John Hackworth.

=== International ===
Eskandarian has played one game for the United States national team, against Wales on May 26, 2003. He has also represented the United States at the U-17, U-20, and U-23 national teams. Eskandarian was leading scorer of the Olympic Qualifying tournament in Mexico in 2004 (4 goals), although the US team failed to qualify for the 2004 Olympics in Athens.

=== Coaching ===
On February 1, 2013, Eskandarian signed with the New York Cosmos as an assistant coach, joining the same club that he once watched his father, Iran defender Andranik Eskandarian play for when he was a child.

Eskandarian was part of head coach Giovanni Savarese's coaching staff during the team's historic 2013 relaunch season. During the 2013 season, Eskandarian helped lead the Cosmos to an undefeated record at home (W-D-L: 5–2–0) and the 2013 North American Soccer League Fall Season title with an overall record of 31 points from 14 games (W-D-L: 9–4–1). The Cosmos would cap the season with the NASL Soccer Bowl, where they defeated the Atlanta Silverbacks 1–0 to capture the club's sixth title of all time.

Eskandarian led the Cosmos B squad to the National Premier Soccer League title on August 8, 2015, defeating Chattanooga FC, 3–2, in overtime. The game was played in Chattanooga, Tennessee, in front of a crowd of 18,227, the largest crowd ever in the United States to see an amateur soccer match. Eskandarian finished his 1st season as a head coach with an undefeated record, as Cosmos B posted a 15–0–1 record in the 2015 NPSL season.

=== Post-coaching ===
After his five-year-long coaching career, Eskandarian began transitioning to front office work at Major League Soccer headquarters in New York City.

== Personal life ==
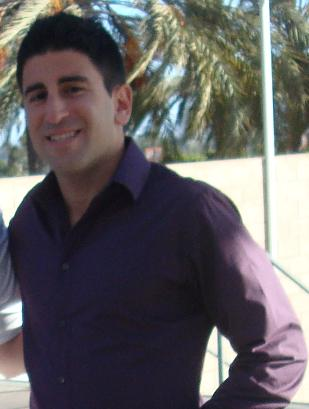
Eskandarian during his stint at LA Galaxy, 2010

Alecko is of Armenian-Iranian descent and is the son of former Iranian soccer player Andranik Eskandarian, who played soccer professionally for the New York Cosmos, and the Iranian national football team.

Eskandarian also appeared on an episode of Keeping Up with the Kardashians. During the episode, fellow Armenian-American Kim Kardashian was set up with him on a blind date.

== Honors ==
=== Player ===
D.C. United

- MLS Cup: 2004
- Supporters' Shield: 2006

Individual

- MLS Cup MVP: 2004
- MLS All-Star: 2004, 2006

=== Head coach ===
New York Cosmos B

- NPSL: 2015

=== Assistant coach ===
New York Cosmos

- Soccer Bowl: 2013, 2015, 2016
