= Nick Garcia =

American soccer player (born 1979)

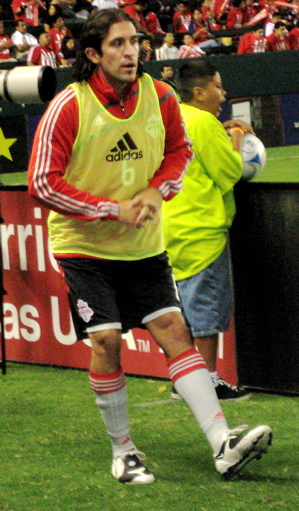
- Garcia in 2009

Personal information
- Full name: Nick Garcia
- Date of birth: April 9, 1979 (age 47)
- Place of birth: Plano, Texas, United States
- Height: 5 ft 10 in (1.78 m)
- Position: Defender

Youth career
- 1994–1998: Dallas Texans

College career
Years	Team	Apps	(Gls)
1997–1999	Indiana Hoosiers		

Senior career*
Years	Team	Apps	(Gls)
2000–2007	Kansas City Wizards	224	(1)
2008–2009	San Jose Earthquakes	36	(0)
2009–2010	Toronto FC	36	(0)
Total		296	(1)

International career^{‡}
1995	United States U-17	2	(0)
1999	United States U-20	4	(0)
2003–2004	United States	6	(0)
- * Club domestic league appearances and goals as of October 23, 2010 ‡ National team caps and goals as of April 4, 2010

Nick Garcia (born April 9, 1979, in Plano, Texas) is an American former professional soccer player.

== Career ==
=== Youth and college ===
As a junior and senior at Bishop Lynch High School in Dallas, Texas, Garcia helped his high school win their first 2 TAPPS state boys soccer championships in 1996 and 1997. He was selected to the all-district, all-state and all-tournament teams. Garcia won the 1996–97 Gatorade National Boys Soccer Player of the Year award, as well, while starring for Dallas Texans youth club. Garcia played college soccer at Indiana University, leading Indiana to the consecutive national titles in 1998 and 1999, and was named All-American in his final season. Garcia was also named the Soccer America National Freshman of the year while at Indiana University and won the 1999 NCAA Defensive MVP in the College Cup Tournament.

=== Professional ===
Garcia signed with Project-40 and MLS in 2000, and was drafted second overall (behind Steve Shak) in the 2000 MLS SuperDraft by the Kansas City Wizards.

Garcia subsequently played in – and started – 224 games for the Wizards between 2000 and 2007 and helped the Wizards win the MLS Cup in 2000, and the US Open Cup in 2004.

He joined the San Jose Earthquakes as their captain upon their return to MLS in 2008. In early 2009 Garcia signed a multi-year contract with San Jose, but was traded (along with the rights to Canadian international Ali Gerba) to Toronto FC on June 9, 2009, for a third round pick in the 2010 MLS SuperDraft.

After the 2010 MLS season Toronto declined Garcia's contract option and he elected to participate in the 2010 MLS Re-Entry Draft. Garcia became a free agent in Major League Soccer when he was not selected in the Re-Entry draft.

=== International ===
Garcia played in the 1997 World Youth Championship in Ecuador and captained the US Under-20 national team at the World Youth Championship in Nigeria in 1999. Garcia earned his first cap for the full national team on January 18, 2003, against Canada. So far, he has amassed six caps for the United States.

== Personal life ==
After retiring, Garcia returned to Kansas City. He worked as an On-Air TV Host for Spectrum Sports for several years. He now serves as executive director of Sporting Brookside and is a professional match evaluator for Major League Soccer.

Garcia is married to his wife MeLinda. They still live in the Kansas City area with their 3 children.

== Honors ==
Kansas City Wizards

- Lamar Hunt U.S. Open Cup: 2004
- Major League Soccer MLS Cup: 2000
- Major League Soccer Supporters' Shield: 2000
- Major League Soccer Western Conference Championship: 2004

Toronto FC

- Canadian Championship: 2009, 2010

Sporting positions
Preceded by Diego Gutiérrez	Kansas City Wizards captain 2006	Succeeded by Jimmy Conrad
Preceded by Wade Barrett	San Jose Earthquakes captain 2008	Succeeded by Ramiro Corrales
