= Chris Klein (soccer) =

American soccer player

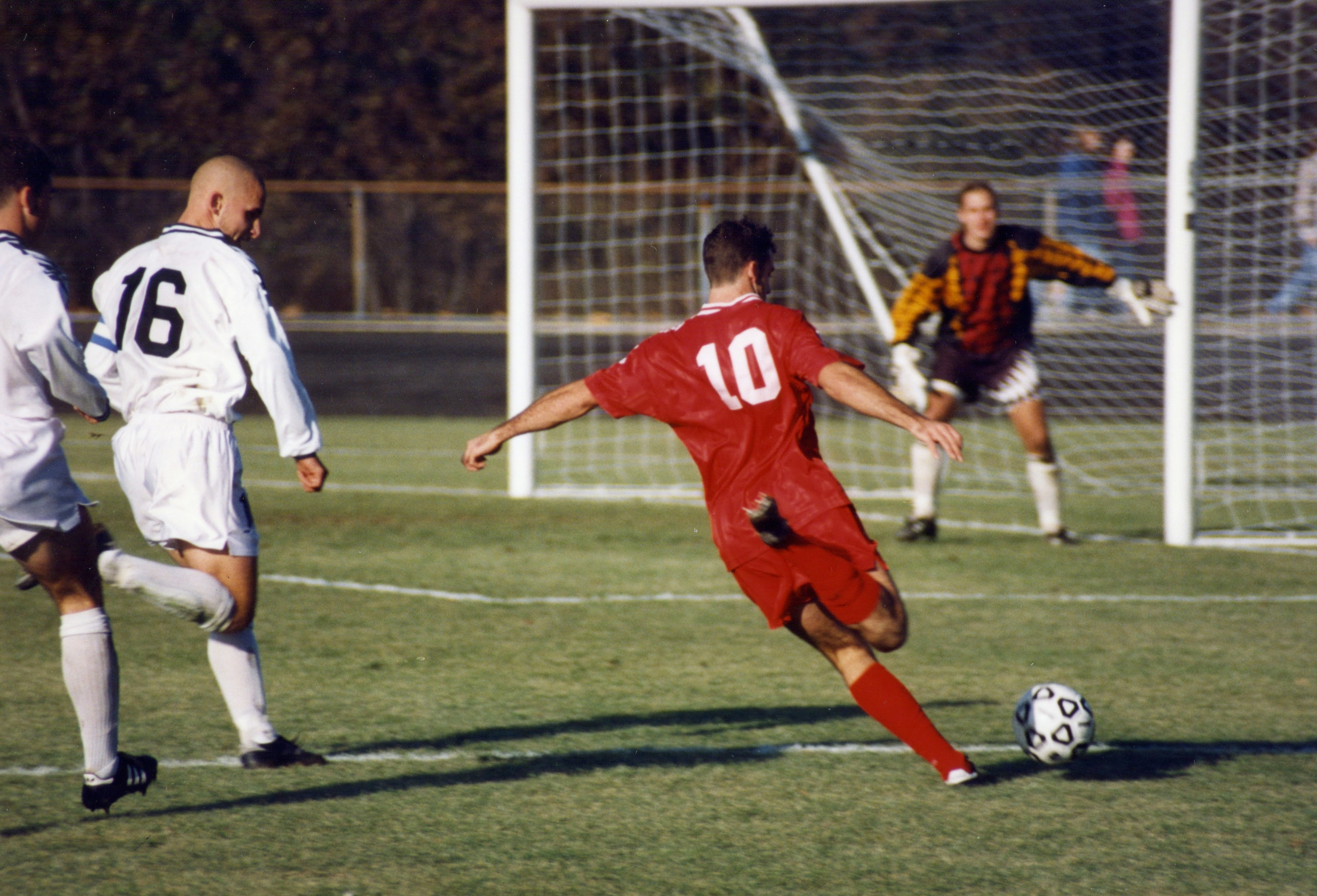
- Chris Klein (in red) playing for Indiana against Butler, 1995

Personal information
- Full name: Chris Klein
- Date of birth: January 4, 1976 (age 50)
- Place of birth: St. Louis, Missouri, United States
- Height: 6 ft 1 in (1.85 m)
- Position: Right midfielder

College career
Years	Team	Apps	(Gls)
1994–1997	Indiana Hoosiers		

Senior career*
Years	Team	Apps	(Gls)
1998–2005	Kansas City Wizards	200	(39)
1998	→ MLS Pro 40 (loan)	1	(0)
2006–2007	Real Salt Lake	43	(8)
2007–2010	Los Angeles Galaxy	90	(2)
Total		333	(49)

International career
2000–2006	United States	22	(5)
- * Club domestic league appearances and goals

Chris Klein (born January 4, 1976) is an American former soccer player who spent 13 seasons in Major League Soccer and earned 22 caps with the United States men's national soccer team. He became the club president of the LA Galaxy on January 28, 2013, after a promotion from vice president. Klein was fired from the LA Galaxy on May 30, 2023, after 11 seasons with the club.

A former midfielder, Klein spent the entirety of his 12-year professional career playing in Major League Soccer, for the Kansas City Wizards, Real Salt Lake and Los Angeles Galaxy, winning the MLS Cup and Supporters' Shield with Kansas City in 2000, and the Supporters' Shield with Los Angeles in 2010, his last year as a professional. He was notable for his fitness and resilience to injury, setting an MLS record in 2008 when he made his 118th consecutive first team start. Klein was also a veteran member of the United States national team during the early 2000s; he acquired 23 caps, scored 5 goals, and represented his country at the 2003 Confederations Cup.

== Career ==
=== Amateur ===
Klein attended De Smet Jesuit High School, winning a Missouri state championship in the fall of 1993. He played three years of college soccer at Indiana University from 1994 to 1997. In total, he started 88 games for the Hoosiers, registering 11 goals and 11 assists as a senior.

=== Professional ===
Upon his graduation, Klein was selected fourth overall by the Kansas City Wizards in the 1998 MLS College Draft. He received little playing time as a rookie, starting eight games and substituting into nine, and scored no points. Starting in 1999, however, Klein began to cement a place for himself as one of the league's best midfielders; in the 1999 season, Klein started 24 games for the Wizards, registering six goals and five assists. He started 26 games in 2000, scoring six goals and eight assists, helping the Wizards to an MLS Cup victory. Klein has been an equally important part of the Wizards midfield for the last four years, although his 2004 campaign was cut short by a torn ACL. He came back in 2005 and was named MLS Comeback Player of the Year for the second time in his career, his first coming in 2002. However, before the 2006 season, Klein was traded with an international roster spot to Real Salt Lake for allocation money.

On June 21, 2007, Klein was traded to Los Angeles Galaxy for midfielder Nathan Sturgis and forward Robbie Findley.

=== International ===
Klein was a fringe player for the United States national team for several years. He received his first cap October 25, 2000 against Mexico, his debut for the men's national team at any age level. He has played in a total of 22 games for the national team, scoring five goals; his best year was 2003, when he played in seven games, and scored three goals.

== After playing career ==
Klein was the club president of the LA Galaxy for 11 seasons, during which the team missed the playoffs four times. A fan protest in 2023 led to his firing. He was also sanctioned by MLS for a violation of roster rules during the 2019 season. He also served as an assistant coach for Newport Mesa Soccer Club, which is part of the West Ham International Academy.

== Personal life ==
Klein is married with three children. He and his wife are evangelical Christians, and Klein is active with the Fellowship of Christian Athletes. Klein resides in suburban Los Angeles with his family.

== Honors ==
Kansas City Wizards

- Lamar Hunt U.S. Open Cup: 2004
- MLS Cup: 2000
- MLS Supporters' Shield: 2000
- Major League Soccer Western Conference Championship: 2000, 2004

Los Angeles Galaxy

- Major League Soccer Supporters' Shield: 2010
- Major League Soccer Western Conference Championship: 2009

Individual

- MLS Fair Play Award: 2006
- MLS Comeback Player of the Year Award: 2002, 2005
