= Josh Wolff =

American soccer coach and former player (born 1977)

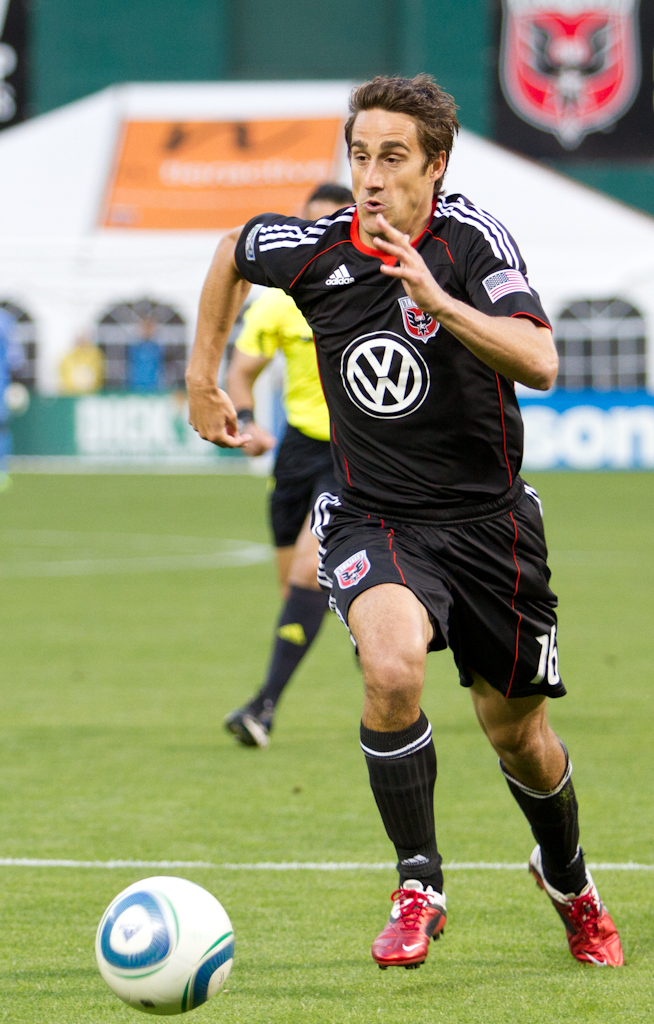
- Wolff playing for D.C. United in 2011

Personal information
- Full name: Joshua David Wolff
- Date of birth: February 25, 1977 (age 49)
- Place of birth: Stone Mountain, Georgia, United States
- Height: 5 ft 8 in (1.73 m)
- Position: Forward

College career
Years	Team	Apps	(Gls)
1995–1997	South Carolina Gamecocks	43	(21)

Senior career*
Years	Team	Apps	(Gls)
1998–2002	Chicago Fire	84	(32)
1998	→ MLS Pro-40 (loan)	18	(12)
2003–2006	Kansas City Wizards	80	(27)
2007–2008	1860 Munich	34	(2)
2008–2010	Kansas City Wizards	64	(16)
2011–2012	D.C. United	39	(5)
Total		319	(94)

International career
1997	United States U20	4	(0)
2000	United States U23	2	(1)
1999–2008	United States	52	(9)

Managerial career
- 2020–2024: Austin FC
- 2026–: Minnesota United FC (Assistant Manager)
Medal record
Representing United States
Winner	CONCACAF Gold Cup	2002
Winner	CONCACAF Gold Cup	2005
Men's Soccer
- * Club domestic league appearances and goals

Joshua David Wolff (born February 25, 1977) is an American former soccer player and current assistant coach for Minnesota United FC.

== Playing career ==
=== College ===
Wolff was born in Stone Mountain, Georgia. He played three years of college soccer at the University of South Carolina, where he scored 21 goals and eight assists in 43 games. He played at South Carolina with future United States national team star Clint Mathis. In addition, Wolff played and captained varsity soccer at Parkview High School, Lilburn, Georgia.

=== Professional ===
After his junior season, Wolff left college and signed with Major League Soccer. MLS assigned Wolff to the Chicago Fire. He set the MLS rookie scoring record (together with Jeff Cunningham, since broken by Damani Ralph) by scoring eight goals, doing so in just 14 games with only four starts. Wolff played the following four seasons for the Fire, scoring 24 goals, but suffered through multiple injuries.

Before the 2003 MLS Superdraft, the Fire traded Wolff, in a cost-cutting move, to the Kansas City Wizards in exchange for the third overall pick, which the Fire used to select Nate Jaqua. Wolff missed most of the 2003 season due to injuries. He rebounded in 2004 by scoring ten goals and seven assists during the season. Wolff scored his first career playoff goal on a penalty kick during the MLS Cup 2004. He scored ten goals and ten assists in 2005.

In September 2006, Wolff had a try out with English Championship club Derby County. The team was pleased enough with his performance to offer MLS a $500,000 transfer fee. However, British immigration officials denied Wolff a work permit based on the fact he had failed to play the required 75% of the U.S. national team's games in the previous two years.

From England, Wolff traveled to Germany for a try out with 2. Bundesliga club 1860 Munich. On December 6, 2006, 1860 Munich signed Wolff to a contract through the 2007–2008 season. Munich paid MLS a $191,000 transfer fee. Wolff joined the team during its January 2007 mid-winter training camp but was waived at the end of the 2008 season.

Wolff signed with the Kansas City Wizards on June 30, 2008. At the end of the 2010 MLS season, after two and a half seasons back in Kansas City, Wolff's contract option was declined by the club.

On December 15, 2010, Wolff was selected by D.C. United in Stage 2 of the 2010 MLS Re-Entry Draft and immediately signed a one-year contract with a club option for 2012.

Wolff announced his retirement on November 28, 2012, and became a full-time assistant coach with D.C. United.

=== International ===
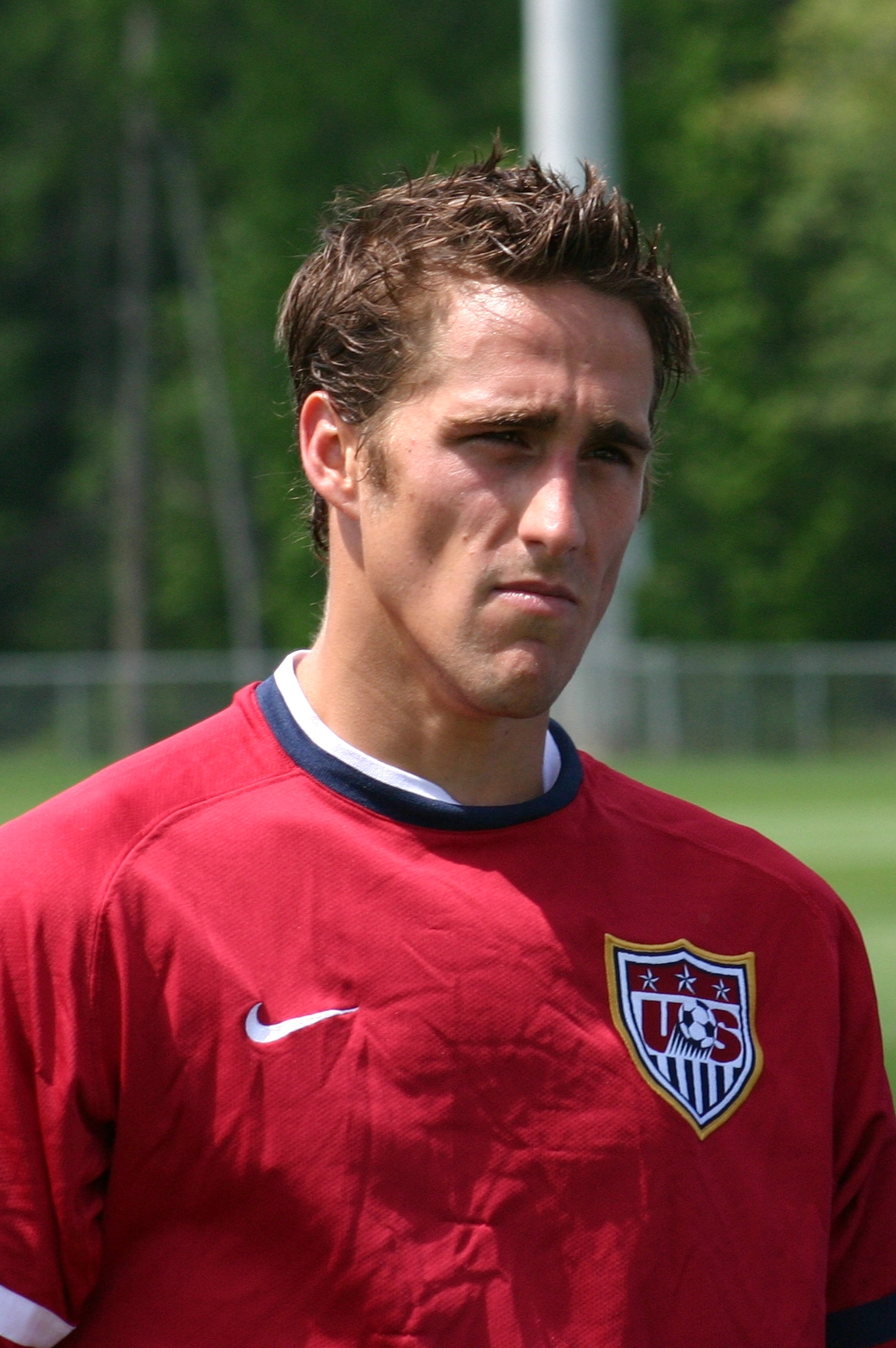
Wolff during training for the U.S. national team

Wolff has scored nine goals in fifty-two caps since his debut against Jamaica on September 8, 1999. He also starred for the US in the 2000 Summer Olympics, scoring two goals and helping the team to a fourth-place finish. As with his club teams, however, Wolff has had trouble securing a definite spot because of continual injury problems. He did play for the United States in the 2002 World Cup, assisting on the opening goal in the second-round win against Mexico. On May 2, 2006, Wolff was named to the US roster for the FIFA World Cup in Germany. Wolff played his last national team match versus Spain at Estadio El Sardinero on June 4, 2008.

==== International goals ====
Goal	Date	Venue	Opponent	Score	Result	Competition
1	October 25, 2000	Los Angeles	Mexico	2–0	2–0	Friendly match
2	February 28, 2001	Columbus, Ohio	Mexico	1–0	2–0	2002 World Cup qualification
3	April 25, 2001	Kansas City, Missouri	Costa Rica	1–0	1–0	2002 World Cup qualification
4	February 2, 2002	Pasadena, California	Costa Rica	1–0	2–0	2002 CONCACAF Gold Cup
5	May 16, 2002	East Rutherford, New Jersey	Jamaica	1–0	5–0	Friendly match
6	May 16, 2002	East Rutherford, New Jersey	Jamaica	3–0	5–0	Friendly match
7	June 20, 2004	St. George's, Grenada	Grenada	2–1	3–2	2006 World Cup qualification
8	July 16, 2005	Foxborough, Massachusetts	Jamaica	1–0	3–1	2005 CONCACAF Gold Cup
9	November 12, 2005	Glasgow, Scotland	Scotland	1–0	1–1	Friendly match

== Coaching career ==
After a season on the coaching staff at D.C. United, Wolff joined the Columbus Crew in November 2013, and remained an assistant coach until 2018. In 2018, Wolff joined the staff of the United States Men's National Team under Gregg Berhalter.

On July 23, 2019, Wolff was announced to be the first head coach of MLS expansion team Austin FC, who began playing with the 2021 season.

Austin FC had 9 wins, 21 defeats, and 4 draws in their expansion season under Wolff, finishing in 12th in the Western Conference, one point above Houston in last. Austin was eliminated from playoff contention on October 16 after a home defeat to Minnesota, with five matches to spare. Wolff played with a 4-3-3 or a 4-2-3-1 formation in his first season, and his team was characterized as having high possession numbers, and for building out from the back. Despite having the fourth-highest average percent possession per game at 53.9%, Austin scored the fewest goals in the league at 35. The team went into their match on October 30 against Dallas with a chance to win the first MLS Copa Tejas, but a 2–1 defeat meant that they finished in third. In his first season as a head coach, Wolff was questioned by the fans about his tactics and substitutions.

Coach Wolff's second year was a stark contrast to what his team had endured in 2021. Though their performance in the U.S. Open Cup ended after a single game, which they lost 2–1 to their Texas USL Championship opponent San Antonio FC, the team's performance in the MLS season was a different story. Scoring 30 more goals and giving up 16 less goals than the 2021 season, Wolff's team ended with a 2nd-place finish in the Western Conference earning a spot in their first MLS Cup Playoffs. Under Wolff's guidance the team continued to be successful, exciting fans by making their way to the Western Conference Finals, losing 3–0 to LAFC in a lackluster performance to end their season.

On October 6, 2024, Austin FC parted ways with Wolff after two disastrous MLS seasons where the club fell short of making either the 2023 or the 2024 MLS Cup playoffs and finished 12th place in the West in 2023 and in 10th place in the West in 2024.

== Personal life ==
Wolff's eldest son Tyler plays for Real Salt Lake, and his younger son Owen played for him at Austin FC.

== Coaching statistics ==
As of matches played on October 5, 2024.

Coaching record by team and tenure
Team	From	To	Record				
Team	From	To	P	W	D	L	Win %
Austin FC	January 1, 2020	October 6, 2024	148	50	31	67	33.8
Total			148	50	31	67	33.8

== Honors ==
Chicago Fire

- U.S. Open Cup: 1998, 2000
- MLS Cup: 1998
- Major League Soccer Western Conference Championship: 1998

Kansas City Wizards

- U.S. Open Cup: 2004
- Major League Soccer Western Conference Championship: 2004

United States

- CONCACAF Gold Cup: 2002, 2005
