= Jack Jewsbury =

American retired soccer player

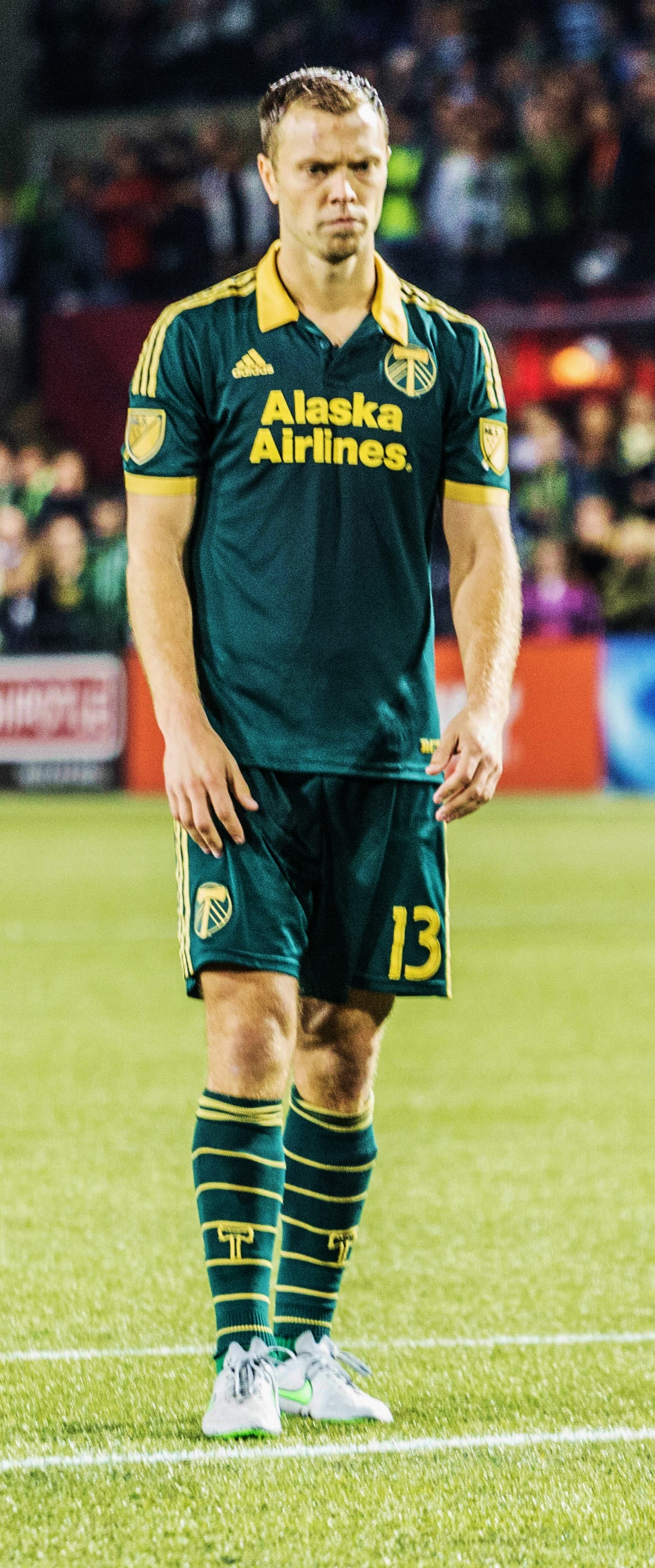

Personal information
- Date of birth: April 13, 1981 (age 45)
- Place of birth: Joplin, Missouri, U.S.
- Height: 6 ft 0 in (1.83 m)
- Positions: Midfielder; defender

College career
Years	Team	Apps	(Gls)
1999–2002	St. Louis Billikens		

Senior career*
Years	Team	Apps	(Gls)
2002	Kansas City Brass		
2003–2010	Kansas City Wizards	195	(14)
2003	→ Syracuse Salty Dogs (loan)	7	(2)
2011–2016	Portland Timbers	157	(14)
Total		359	(30)
- * Club domestic league appearances and goals as of 07:14, 23 May 2016 (UTC)

Jack Jewsbury (born April 13, 1981) is an American retired soccer player who played primarily as a midfielder. Upon his retirement in 2016, Jewsbury was one of ten players to have appeared in more than 350 matches in Major League Soccer.

== Career ==
=== Youth and college ===
Jewsbury was born in Joplin, Missouri. He attended Kickapoo High School in Springfield, Missouri, where he scored a state record 59 goals in his senior season and 124 goals in his four-year high school career. He was named First-team All-Midwest Region, All-State, All-District, All-Ozark Conference and conference Player of the Year as a senior, and was a three-time All-District and All-State selection, before having his #21 jersey retired.

Jewsbury played five years of college soccer at Saint Louis University, finishing his career tied for tenth on the school's all-time scoring list with 101 points. Jewsbury was twice named first team All-Conference USA, winning the Conference Player of the Year award as a sophomore. During his college years, he also played with Kansas City Brass in the Premier Development League.

=== Professional ===
==== Kansas City Wizards ====
Jewsbury was drafted 43rd overall in the 2003 MLS SuperDraft by the Kansas City Wizards, and signed to a developmental contract. As a rookie, Jewsbury struggled for playing time, appearing for only 61 minutes all season. In July and August 2003, the Wizards sent Jewsbury on loan to the Syracuse Salty Dogs of the USL A-League. In his second year, however, Jewsbury played much more, becoming a significant utility player for the Wizards. That year he helped the club capture the 2004 Lamar Hunt U.S. Open Cup and the Western Conference title. He continued to progress with the club and soon became a very influential player for Kansas City. In eight years with the club, the central midfielder would appear in 195 league matches and score 14 goals.

==== Portland Timbers ====
Jewsbury was traded to the Portland Timbers for allocation money on March 1, 2011. Jewsbury was given the captain's armband, becoming the expansion side's first captain in MLS. Jewsbury was named to the 2011 MLS All-Star Game, finishing the season with career highs in both goals and assists. In the 2012 season, Jewsbury scored the winning goal as Portland defeated the Vancouver Whitecaps to win the Cascadia Cup trophy. As his playing time declined, Jewsbury was named "club captain" as other players took over the role of on-field captain. Jewsbury appeared in all of the Timbers' playoff games during his tenure with the club, including the Timbers' victory in MLS Cup 2015.

==== Retirement ====
Jewsbury announced his retirement in September 2016, during the annual "Stand Together" community outreach banquet hosted by the Timbers and the Portland Thorns. Several players, including long-time teammate Darlington Nagbe, expressed their appreciation of Jewsbury.

After retiring, Jewsbury was hired by the Timbers in a non-playing capacity as Director of Business Development.

== Honors ==
=== Club ===
Kansas City Wizards

- Lamar Hunt U.S. Open Cup (1): 2004
- Western Conference (playoffs) (1): 2004

Portland Timbers

- MLS Cup (1): 2015
- Western Conference (playoffs) (1): 2015
- Western Conference (regular season) (1): 2013

=== Individual ===
- MLS All-Star: 2011

Sporting positions
Preceded by N/A	Portland Timbers captain 2011–2012	Succeeded by Will Johnson
