= José Burciaga Jr. =

American soccer player

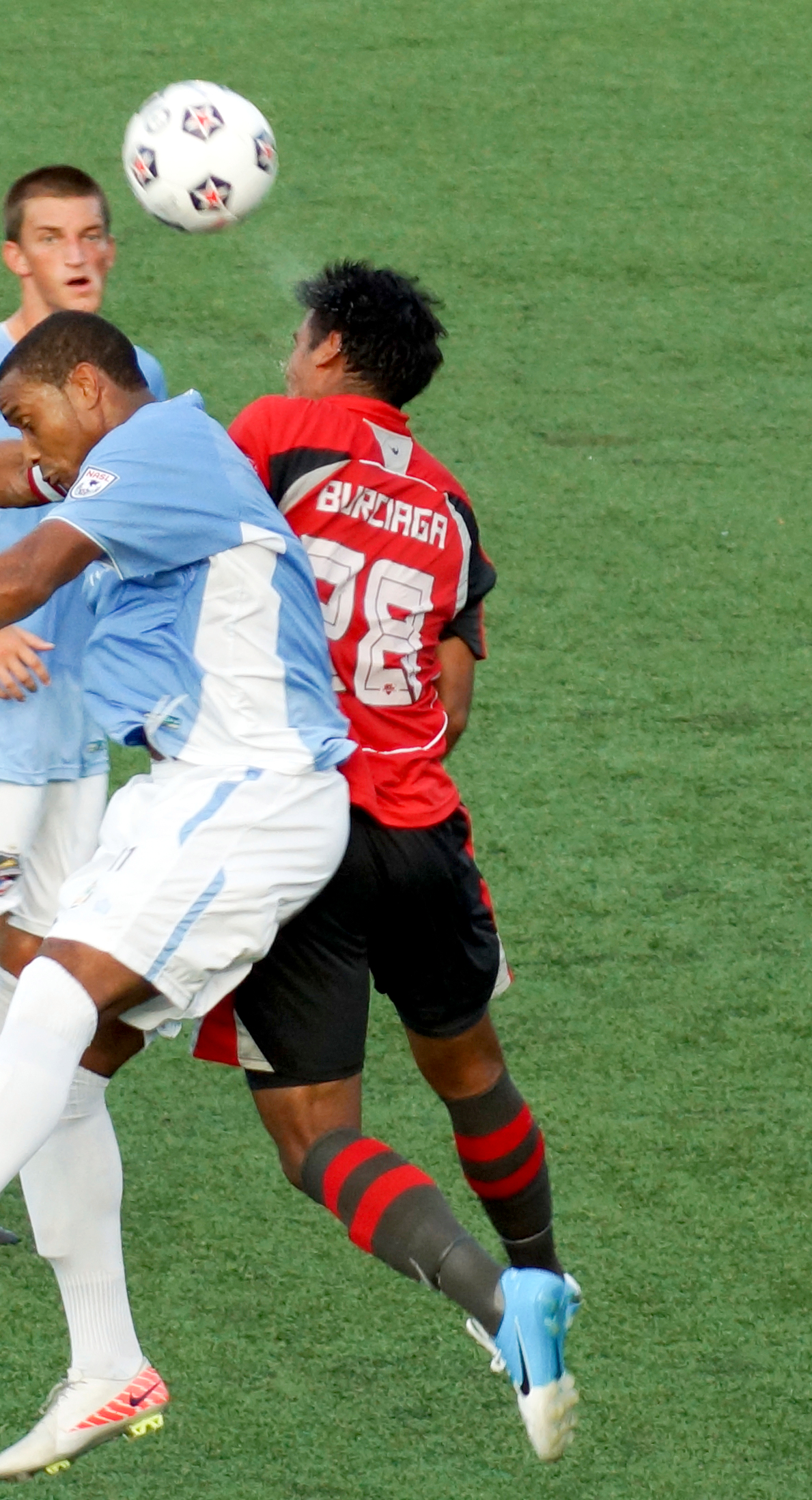
- Burciaga in 2012 with the Atlanta Silverbacks

Personal information
- Full name: José Luis Burciaga Jr.
- Date of birth: November 16, 1981 (age 44)
- Place of birth: Dallas, Texas, United States
- Height: 6 ft 1 in (1.85 m)
- Position: Defender

Youth career
- Dallas Texans SC
- Duncanville HS Panthers

Senior career*
Years	Team	Apps	(Gls)
2001–2007	Kansas City Wizards	115	(13)
2001	→ MLS Pro-40 (loan)	3	(0)
2001	→ Portland Timbers (loan)	2	(0)
2001	→ Pittsburgh Riverhounds (loan)	0	(0)
2008	Colorado Rapids	12	(1)
2012	Atlanta Silverbacks	13	(0)
2018–2019	Dallas Sidekicks (indoor)	0	(0)
Total		145	(14)

International career^{‡}
2000–2001	United States U20	37	(3)
2002–2003	United States U23	5	(0)
- * Club domestic league appearances and goals as of 25 November 2019 ‡ National team caps and goals as of May 22, 2012

José Luis Burciaga Jr. (born November 16, 1981, in Oak Cliff, Texas) is an American retired soccer player who is currently the General Manager of Keene FC. He is the former founder of Wizards Futbol Club, a youth soccer academy.

== Career ==
Burciaga played youth soccer for the Dallas Texans Soccer Club and graduated from Duncanville High School where he was the 2000 District 7 soccer MVP and two-time All State. Instead of attending college, Burciaga opted to turn professional after finishing high school, signing a Project-40 contract with MLS.

Burciaga was selected 12th overall in the 2001 MLS SuperDraft by the Kansas City Wizards. Although a star with United States youth national teams, he was not immediately ready for MLS. He played two games on loan to the Portland Timbers of the USL A-League. He also played three games for Project 40 and one game with the Pittsburgh Riverhounds in an August 2001 U.S. Open Cup game. He finished the season with the Wizards with three games, two of them starts.

Burciaga tore his left knee's ACL in preseason and missed the entire 2002 season rehabbing the injury. He came on strong in 2003, earning the left back starting position in preseason and looking poised to finally come into his own; he tore his right knee's ACL in the fourth game of the season and so finished the year with only those four starts. After two painful years, Burciaga returned to the Wizards' lineup in 2004 and was injury-free for the entire year. Given the opportunity, he seized the left back position and kept it all year long. He finished the season with 21 starts out of 24 games played, and added one goal and one assist.

In 2005, Burciaga was selected out of all the MLS players to the MLS Select team vs. Real Madrid at the Estadio Santiago Bernabéu for the Trofeo Bernabeu. 2006 was Burciaga's breakout year, as he scored 8 goals and 8 assists, several of them spectacular, in earning MLS Best XI honors for the first time and team MVP.

Burciaga was traded by the Kansas City Wizards to league rivals Colorado Rapids on January 16, 2008, in return for a 2009 second round 2009 MLS SuperDraft pick. Colorado opted not to renew his contract for the 2009 season.

Burciaga trialed with Orlando City during the 2011 preseason but was not offered a contract with the team. In the spring of 2012, Burciaga attempted to earn a roster spot with MLS side D.C. United but was not successful. He ended up playing in 2012 for the Atlanta Silverbacks of the second division NASL.

Burciaga returned to professional soccer in late 2018, signing with the Major Arena Soccer League's Dallas Sidekicks.

== Jose Burciaga Jr. Academy ==
In 2002, Burciaga founded the Wizards Futbol Club in Dallas, Texas. Established by Jose Luis Burciaga Sr. and Jose Luis Burciaga Jr., Wizards FC is a community based not for profit organization designed to provide a high level of training and development that will prepare all players for college and beyond.

At the 2014 Dallas Cup, Wizards FC had two teams participating with one team going to the finals.

=== Partnership ===
On August 4, 2014, Wolverhampton Wanderers of England agreed to a partnership with Wizards FC. Wizards FC coaches and players will have the opportunity to work with the academy coaches of Wolves in both North America and England, offering an insight into the player development program of one of the top English soccer academies. The partnership will provide players and coaches access to a club renowned for producing world class players.

The partnership will see the Wolves North American Academy hosting a series of Elite Player ID events with Wizards FC. Wolves will send Academy staff members over to work with Wizards FC players at these events. The best male and female players at these events will be invited to attend the Wolves National Camp. The National Camp will host the top players from each of partner club in North America. From the National Camp, the top players will be invited to attend the Elite Player Tour at Wolves' Academy in Wolverhampton, England.

Jose Luis Burciaga Jr. stated that: "We are excited about our new partnership with Wolves, and we are looking forward to working together to help develop our young players to become the next generation of soccer players. Thank you to Global Image Sports for thinking about our club, and thank you Wolves for the opportunity."

== Honors ==
- U.S. Open Cup Champion: 2004
- MLS Cup Runner Up: 2004

=== Individual ===
- MLS Best XI: 2006
- KC Wizards MVP: 2006
- MLS Humanitarian of the Year: 2008

Burciaga Jr. was recognized as an exemplary athlete within the community based on his work with the U.S. Soccer Foundation's Passback Program and the establishment of his foundation, the Jose Luis Burciaga Jr. Foundation. Burciaga Jr.'s foundation focuses on the positive impact of sports and the ideals of teamwork, discipline, and respect in the developing of young minds. The foundation promotes youth involvement in sports, education, community service, and cultural awareness.

- Top 50 MLS Moment #29. Bomb Drop: 2004

In 132 games played in MLS, Burciaga scored 14 times. But not many of his blasts were more impressive, and certainly none came on a bigger stage, than his goal in the 2004 MLS Cup against D.C. United at the Home Depot Center in Carson, California. "He can crush a ball," said former Kansas City teammate Jimmy Conrad. "He can crush it, and even if it skips a few times, you know it's going in." "That was the first goal scored on me in MLS Cup, so I took it pretty hard," recalled Nick Rimando, now manning the nets for Real Salt Lake. "Ryan Nelsen was right there, and it went by him, and that's why I reacted a bit slow to it. If I’d seen it, I would’ve probably reacted a little earlier. But [Burciaga] hit it well and I reacted slow, and it cost us a goal. It was kind of a shock."
