= Alex Zotincă =

Romanian footballer and coach

Personal information
- Full name: Alexandru Florin Zotincă
- Date of birth: 22 January 1977 (age 49)
- Place of birth: Sibiu, Romania
- Height: 1.82 m (6 ft 0 in)
- Position: Defender

Senior career*
Years	Team	Apps	(Gls)
1995–1998	Inter Sibiu	51	(4)
1998–1999	Steaua București	8	(0)
1999–2000	Gaz Metan Mediaș	12	(1)
2000–2003	Kansas City Comets (indoor)	118	(65)
2003–2006	Kansas City Wizards	85	(3)
2007–2008	Chivas USA	26	(0)
2010	Chivas USA	1	(0)
Total		301	(73)

Managerial career
- 2010–2011: Chivas Jr. (U-14 Head coach)
- 2011–: United FC
- * Club domestic league appearances and goals

Alexandru Florin Zotincă (born 22 January 1977) is a Romanian-American former professional association football coach and former player who played as a defender. His older brother, Dorin was also a footballer.

== Playing career ==
Born in Sibiu, Zotinca began his career with local club Inter Sibiu, where he played from 1995 to 1998. In 1998, he moved to Steaua București, where he would play from 1998 to 2000, and with whom he would appear in the UEFA Cup.

In 2000, Zotinca won a United States Green Card in an immigration lottery, and left Romania for America. He played for three years for the Kansas City Comets of the MISL, being named to the All-Rookie team in 2000–01, and the All-Star team in 2002–03. Near the beginning of the 2003 MLS season, Zotinca was signed by the Wizards. He did well in his first year, starting 14 games and playing 1239 minutes in a variety of positions for the Wizards. In 2004, Zotinca firmly established himself at the right back position, and played most of the team's minutes there, appearing in 25 games and playing 1779 minutes. He played a similarly important role during the next two seasons, but failed to sign a new contract with the team for the 2007 season and was traded to Chivas USA. Zotinca started 20 games for the club during 2007, but played a diminished role in the next season due at a torn ACL, starting only 4 games, and was waived by Chivas USA on 28 November 2008.

After a two-year layoff from professional football, Zotincă was re-signed by Chivas USA on 4 June 2010 to strengthen their defensive unit.

After the 2010 MLS season, Zotincă retired due to a back injury and additional knee surgery.

== Coaching career ==
After the end of his playing career, he was part of the Chivas USA Youth team coaching staff. In December 2011, he has worked as head coach of United Futebol Club in San Juan Capistrano. He had other coaching roles at Irvine High School and Irvine Valley College.

He also spent several years as a Talent Development Manager at US Soccer and then was in charge of Domestic Scouting at the LA Galaxy for their Youth Academy.

In July 2023, he was named assistant coach and recruiting coordinator for the men’s soccer team at Soka University of America.

== Honours ==
Steaua Bucharest

- Romanian Cup: 1998–99

Gaz Metan Mediaș

- Liga II: 1999–00

Sporting Kansas City

- Lamar Hunt U.S. Open Cup: 2004
- MLS (Western Conference Championship): 2004

Individual

- MISL All-Rookie team: 2001
- MISL Al-Star: 2003
