= Kerry Zavagnin =

American soccer player and coach (born 1974)

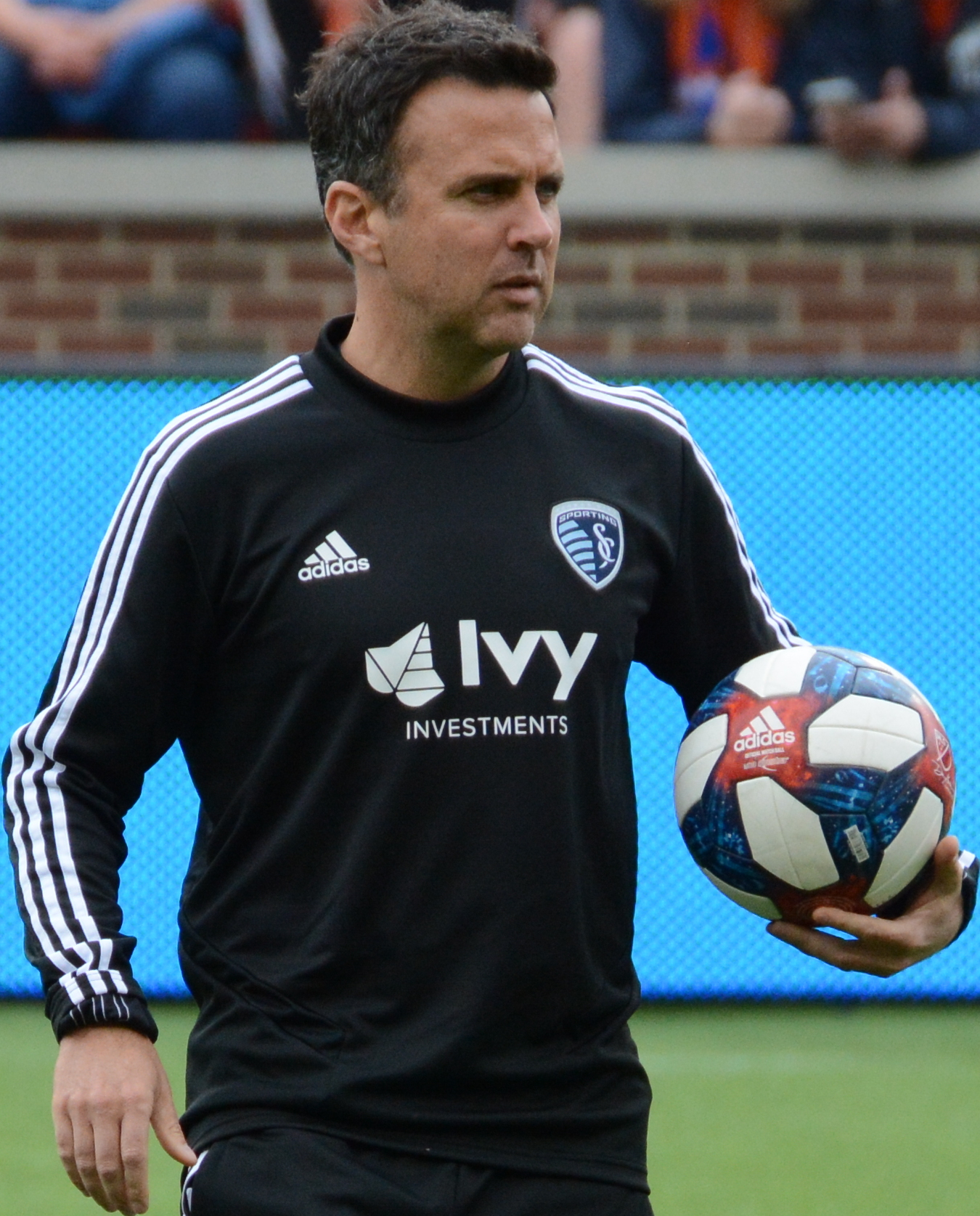
- Zavagnin coaching for Sporting Kansas City in 2019.

Personal information
- Full name: Keirnan I. Zavagnin
- Date of birth: July 2, 1974 (age 52)
- Place of birth: Plymouth, Michigan, United States
- Height: 5 ft 10 in (1.78 m)
- Position: Defensive midfielder

College career
| Years | Team | Apps | (Gls) |
| 1992–1995 | North Carolina | 76 | (22) |

Senior career*
| Years | Team | Apps | (Gls) |
| 1993 | Raleigh Flyers | | |
| 1996 | Raleigh Flyers | | |
| 1997–1998 | MetroStars | 39 | (0) |
| 1997 | → Long Island Rough Riders (loan) | 2 | (0) |
| 1999 | Lehigh Valley Steam | 24 | (2) |
| 2000–2008 | Kansas City Wizards | 205 | (5) |

International career
| 2000–2006 | United States | 21 | (0) |

Managerial career
- 2009–2025: Sporting Kansas City (Note: The club was known as the Kansas City Wizards prior to rebranding as Sporting Kansas City in 2011) (assistant)
- 2025: Sporting Kansas City (interim)
- * Club domestic league appearances and goals

Kerry Zavagnin (/zəˈvæɡnɪn/; born July 2, 1974) is an American soccer coach and former professional player who was the interim manager of Sporting Kansas City. A defensive midfielder, he spent most of his career with Kansas City Wizards of Major League Soccer. He made 21 appearances for the United States national team.

== Career ==
=== Early career ===
Zavagnin went to and played soccer for Detroit Catholic Central High School.

He played his college soccer at the University of North Carolina at Chapel Hill from 1992 to 1995, where he registered 22 goals and 24 assists in 76 games. Upon graduating, Zavagnin joined the Raleigh Flyers of the USISL, one of the two major outdoor second divisions in US soccer, for their 1996 season.

=== Professional career ===
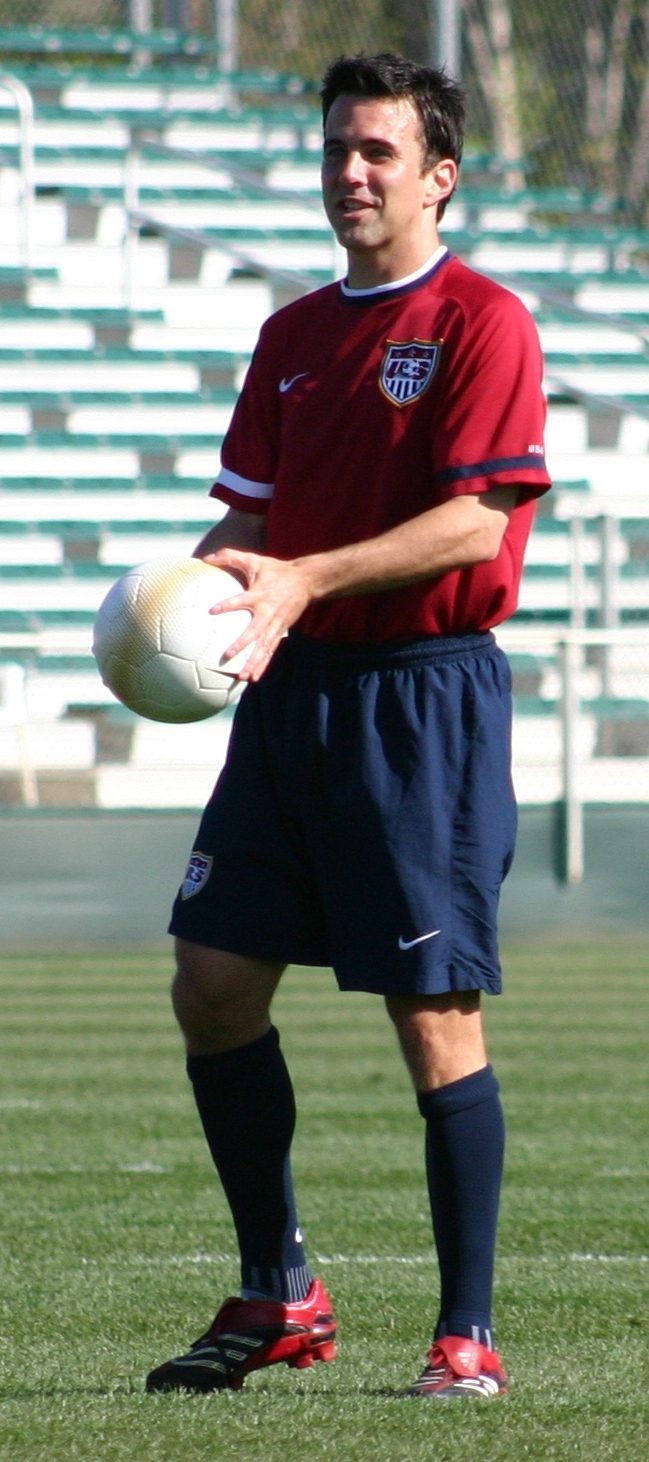
Zavagnin training with the United States national team.

Zavagnin was born in Plymouth, Michigan. After one year with the Flyers, he was drafted 21st overall with the first pick of the third round in the 1997 MLS Supplemental Draft by the Colorado Rapids. Before playing a single game for the Rapids, however, Kerry was traded to the New York/New Jersey MetroStars, in exchange for Peter Vermes. Zavagnin played 1743 minutes for the Metros in 1997 and 1998, and did not acquit himself well, playing himself out of MLS. In 1997, the MetroStars sent him on loan to the Long Island Rough Riders of the USISL.

Zavagnin joined the Lehigh Valley Steam of the A-League for the 1999 season. After one season in the A-League, Zavagnin returned to MLS after being drafted 30th overall in the 2000 MLS SuperDraft by the Kansas City Wizards. Zavagnin quickly established himself with the Wizards, playing 2743 minutes at midfield for a team that would both go on to win the MLS Cup, and was one of the best defensive teams in the league's history. Zavagnin remained an important contributor to the Wizards for the next six years, playing a quiet defensive role, and establishing himself as one of the better, though also one of the least recognized, midfielders in the league.

In 2004, Zavagnin began to be recognized among the league's elite. He won a lot of praise for running the Wizards midfield, and was named to the MLS Best XI. In eight years in the league, Zavagnin scored five goals and added 20 assists in regular season play.

Zavagnin received 21 caps for the U.S. national team, making his debut October 25, 2000, against US arch-rival Mexico.

In August, 2008, Zavagnin announced that he would retire at the end of the season.

=== Coaching career ===
In 2009, Zavagnin joined Sporting Kansas City as an assistant coach.

On March 31, 2025, after Sporting Kansas City parted ways with Peter Vermes, Zavagnin was named interim manager for the remainder of the season.

== Career statistics ==
As of July 25

Appearances and goals by club, season and competition
| Club | Season | Domestic | | Playoffs | | US Open Cup | | Continental | | Total | |
| Club | Season | Apps | Goals | Apps | Goals | Apps | Goals | Apps | Goals | Apps | Goals |
|---|---|---|---|---|---|---|---|---|---|---|---|
| Kansas City Wizards | 2006* | 19 | 0 | | | 0 | 0 | | | | |
| Kansas City Wizards | 2005 | 28 | 0 | | | | | | | 28 | 0 |
| Kansas City Wizards | 2004 | 24 | 0 | 4 | 0 | | | | | 28 | 0 |
| Kansas City Wizards | 2003 | 29 | 1 | 3 | 0 | | | | | 32 | 1 |
| Kansas City Wizards | 2002 | 27 | 1 | 3 | 0 | | | | | 31 | 1 |
| Kansas City Wizards | 2001 | 27 | 1 | 3 | 0 | | | | | 31 | 1 |
| Kansas City Wizards | 2000 | 31 | 2 | 7 | 0 | | | | | 39 | 2 |
| Kansas City Wizards | Total | 185 | 5 | 20 | 0 | | | | | 189 | 5 |
| MetroStars | 1998 | 18 | 0 | | | | | | | 18 | 0 |
| MetroStars | 1997 | 21 | 0 | | | | | | | 21 | 0 |
| MetroStars | Total | 39 | 0 | | | | | | | 39 | 0 |
| Career total | | 228 | 5 | 20 | 0 | | | | | 228 | 5 |

== Coaching statistics ==
As of match played 18 October 2025

Coaching record by team and tenure
| Team | Nat | From | To | Record | | | | | | | |
| Team | Nat | From | To | G | W | D | L | GF | GA | GD | Win % |
|---|---|---|---|---|---|---|---|---|---|---|---|
| Sporting Kansas City | (United States) | March 31, 2025 | December 2, 2025 | 28 | 7 | 6 | 15 | 40 | 58 | −18 | 25.00 |

== Honors ==
Kansas City Wizards

- MLS Cup: 2000
- Supporters' Shield: 2000
- U.S. Open Cup: 2004

Individual

- MLS Best XI: 2004
- Major League Soccer All-Star Game: 2004
- Sporting Legend: Class of 2016
