= Bob Gansler =

Hungarian-born American soccer player and coach

Personal information
- Full name: Robert Gansler
- Date of birth: July 1, 1941 (age 85)
- Place of birth: Mucsi, Hungary
- Position: Defender

Senior career*
Years	Team	Apps	(Gls)
1967	Chicago Mustangs		

International career
1968	United States	5	(0)

Managerial career
- 1979–1982: United States U19
- 1984–1988: UW–Milwaukee Panthers
- 1987–1989: United States U20
- 1989–1991: United States
- 1996–1998: Milwaukee Rampage
- 1999–2006: Kansas City Wizards
- 2007: Toronto FC (assistant)
- * Club domestic league appearances and goals

Bob Gansler (born July 1, 1941) is a Hungarian-born American soccer player and coach of German descent. He coached the U.S. national team at the 1990 World Cup, the team's first appearance at the tournament since 1950.

== Playing career ==
As a player, Gansler made 25 appearances for the United States between 1963 and 1969, captaining the 1964 and 1968 Olympic qualifying teams and 1967 Pan American team. Of his 25 appearances, only 5, all in 1968, came in games considered full internationals.

Gansler played for the Chicago Mustangs of the National Professional Soccer League in 1967. When the NPSL merged with the United Soccer Association to form the North American Soccer League, the Spurs likewise merged with the Chicago Mustangs, and Gansler played with the Mustangs of the NASL in 1968.

== Coaching career ==
Gansler served in various coaching positions with the national teams beginning in 1975. In the late 1980s, he served as the coach of the U.S. U-20 national team while also coaching the University of Wisconsin–Milwaukee men's soccer team. On January 16, 1989, the United States Soccer Federation hired him as the full-time coach for the United States men's national soccer team, replacing Lothar Osiander. Gansler's tenure during the 1990 FIFA World Cup was somewhat controversial, even though he led the United States to its first appearance in the final World Cup tournament in 40 years. He took a team made up primarily of college and amateur players, leaving professionals such as Rick Davis and Hugo Perez off the roster. At the time, the United States did not have a top division outdoor soccer league, the North American Soccer League having folded in 1985. Most domestic professionals at the time played in indoor leagues, and Gansler felt that the skills required for indoor soccer conflicted with the outdoor game. In addition, the United States had been awarded the 1994 World Cup, and Gansler may have wanted to expose the core of the 1994 team to the World Cup experience. Not unexpectedly, the U.S. lost all three games, although the team won a moral victory of sorts by losing to host Italy 1–0; the Italians prevented the embarrassment of a draw thanks to goalkeeper Walter Zenga.

Gansler went on to coach the Kansas City Wizards, winning the club's first MLS Cup in 2000 and the U.S. Open Cup in 2004. He also coached the Milwaukee Rampage to the A-League title in 1997. He stepped down from his coaching position with the Wizards on July 19, 2006. Gansler spent the 2007 MLS Season in Canada as an assistant coach for Toronto FC.

== Personal life ==
After leaving Toronto FC in 2007, he retired to spend more time with his wife, Nancy, four sons, and 11 grandchildren.

== Coaching positions ==
- Marquette University High School varsity soccer team head coach (1970–1976)
- United States U19 (1979–1982)
- Homestead High School varsity soccer coach (1982–1984)
- UWM (1984–1988)
- United States U20 (1987–1989)
- U.S. National Team (1989–1991)
- Milwaukee Rampage (1996–1998)
- Kansas City Wizards (1999–2006)
- Toronto FC (assistant coach) (2006–2007)

== Honors ==
- Walt Chyzowych Award (2000)
- MLS Coach of the Year Award (2000)
- MLS Supporters' Shield (2000)
- MLS Cup (2000)
- Milwaukee Rampage Hall of Fame (inducted 2002)
- United Soccer Leagues Hall of Fame (inducted 2002)
- U.S. Open Cup (2004)
- Sporting Legends Inductee (2013)
