= Jimmy Conrad =

American soccer player (born 1977)

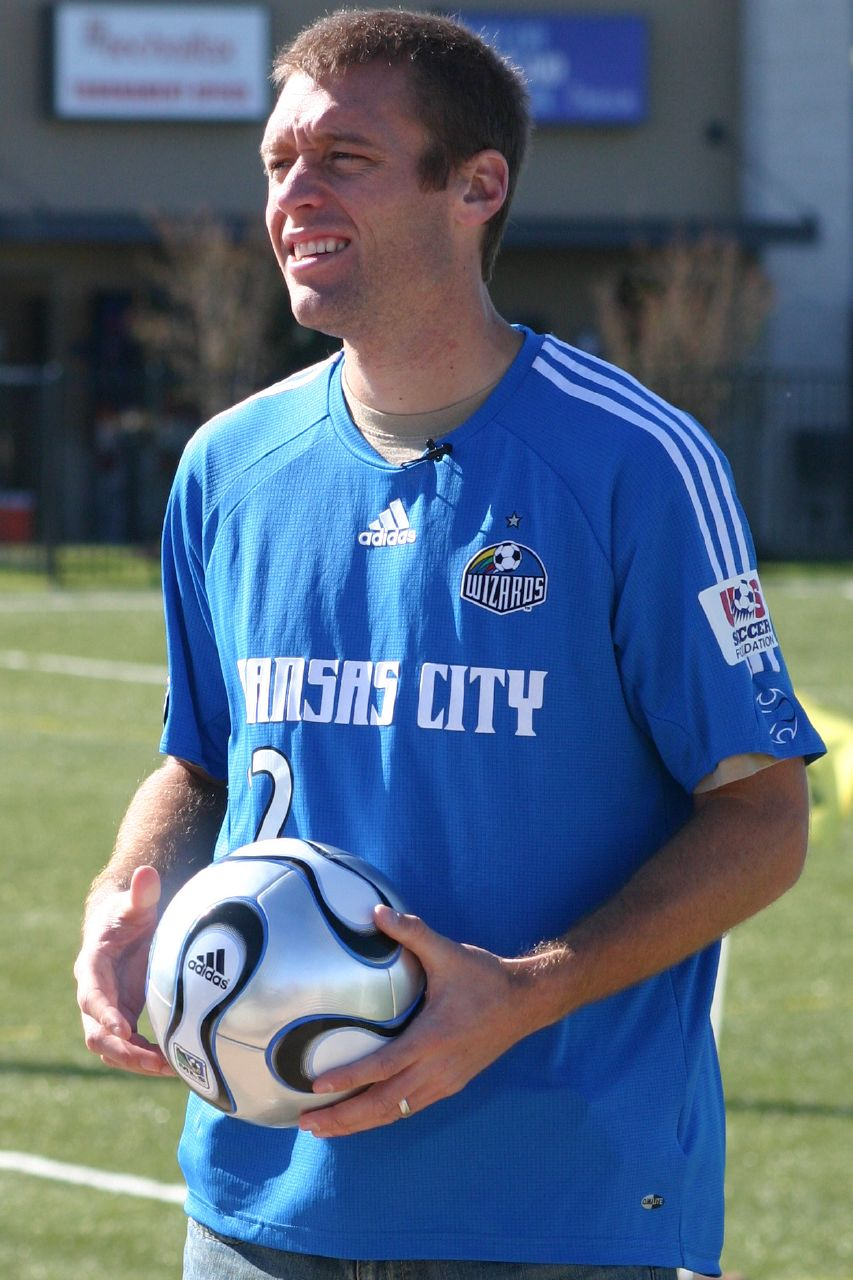
- Conrad at the 2006 MLS Cup

Personal information
- Full name: James Paul Conrad
- Date of birth: February 12, 1977 (age 49)
- Place of birth: Arcadia, California, United States
- Height: 6 ft 2 in (1.88 m)
- Position: Defender

Team information
- Current team: San Francisco Glens (head coach)

College career
Years	Team	Apps	(Gls)
1994–1995	San Diego State Aztecs		
1996–1997	UCLA Bruins		

Senior career*
Years	Team	Apps	(Gls)
1998	San Diego Flash	26	(2)
1999–2002	San Jose Earthquakes	84	(2)
1999	→ San Francisco Seals (loan)	1	(0)
1999	→ MLS Pro-40 (loan)	5	(0)
2000	→ Lech Poznań (loan)	8	(0)
2003–2010	Kansas City Wizards	204	(17)
2011	Chivas USA	2	(1)
Total		325	(22)

International career
2005–2010	United States	27	(1)

Managerial career
- 2011: Chivas USA (assistant)
- 2018–2019, 2022: San Francisco Glens (associate)
- 2020: San Francisco Glens
YouTube information
Channel	Jimmy Conrad
Years active	2016–present
Subscribers	117 thousand
Views	15 million
- * Club domestic league appearances and goals

James Paul Conrad (born February 12, 1977) is an American former soccer player who played as a defender. During his 13-year MLS career, he was four-time MLS Best XI and the 2005 MLS Defender of the Year. He also earned 27 caps with the United States men's national soccer team and went to the 2006 FIFA World Cup.

After his playing career Conrad has worked in the media industry and currently stars on his YouTube channel Jimmy Conrad, he also streams on Twitch regularly. He currently serves as the technical director of USL League Two side San Francisco Glens.

== Early life ==
On February 12, 1977, Conrad was born in Arcadia, California. Conrad attended Temple City High School in Temple City, California.

Conrad attended Temple City High School in Temple City, California and was a four-year letterman in soccer. Conrad played at San Diego State University in 1994 and 1995, and then transferred to the University of California, Los Angeles. While playing for UCLA, he was a member of the 1997 NCAA Championship team.

== Playing career ==
=== Professional ===
Undrafted by MLS, Conrad had an unsuccessful trial with the Los Angeles Galaxy. However, the Galaxy coaching staff recommended he play for one of their affiliated lower division teams. Consequently, Conrad contacted the now-defunct San Diego Flash of the A-League which gave him a contract. In 1999, Brian Quinn became the head coach of the San Jose Clash. When Quinn began searching for an additional defender and goalkeeper for the Clash, Ralf Wilhelms, head coach of the Flash and a former teammate of Quinn on the San Diego Sockers, recommended Conrad and Flash goalkeeper Joe Cannon. The Clash signed Conrad that year. He played with the club, later re-branded as the Earthquakes, for four seasons, helping them to the MLS Cup in 2001. In 2000, he also played for Lech Poznań in Poland.

In 2003, Conrad was traded to the Wizards for a second-round draft pick, which the 'Quakes used to select Arturo Alvarez. Conrad's stock rose while with Kansas City; never a big scorer, he tallied four goals during his first season (he has ten in his MLS career). In 2004, he helped the Wizards to the US Open Cup and the MLS Cup Final as the leader of the league's stingiest defense and was named to the league's Best XI and was a finalist for MLS Defender of the Year Award. He won the award a year later.

Despite rumors of a possible European transfer following the Wizards' disappointing 2006 season, Conrad renewed his contract with the Wizards beginning the 2007 season, and new head coach Curt Onalfo rewarded him the club captaincy.

Conrad was out of contract after the 2010 MLS season and elected to participate in the 2010 MLS Re-Entry Draft. On December 15, 2010, Conrad was selected by Chivas USA in Stage 2 of the Re-Entry draft. He made his debut, and scored his first goal for his new team on March 19, 2011, in their first game of the 2011 MLS season – ironically against his old club, Sporting Kansas City.

After struggling with injury during the 2011 season, and suffering from side effects of six concussions, Jimmy Conrad announced his retirement from professional soccer on August 18, 2011.

=== International ===
Conrad received his first cap for the United States national team on July 7, 2005, in a Gold Cup match against Cuba. Less than one year later, Conrad made the U.S. roster for the 2006 FIFA World Cup. In Germany, Conrad came in as a substitute against Italy in the team's 1–1 draw with the eventual champions, and played all ninety minutes against Ghana. On January 20, 2007, Conrad captained the national team for the second time, where the United States hosted an international friendly with Denmark. The U.S. won that match 3–1. On February 7, 2007, in an international friendly with Mexico, Conrad was named the Man of the Match. He scored his first-ever goal for the U.S. in the fifty-second minute of that match. On June 25, 2009, after not having played with the national team in previous qualifying, Conrad was named to the U.S. squad for the CONCACAF Gold Cup.

== Coaching ==
In September 2018, Conrad became technical director and head associate coach of the San Francisco Glens. He was named head coach of the Glens ahead of the 2020 season. In 2022, Conrad returned to his role as technical director and head associate coach for the Glens to work with new head coach Gabe Saucedo. The club made the USL League Two playoffs for the first time that season, upsetting top-seeded Capital FC before bowing out in the Western Conference semifinals.

== Awards ==
- 2012 Grand Marshal at 68th Annual Camellia Festival of Temple City.
- 2014 Sporting Legends. Presented by Sporting Kansas City.

== Personal life ==
Conrad's wife is Lyndsey Conrad. They have two daughters, Julia Rose Conrad, born in 2007, Jane Mirabelle Conrad, born 2011. He is a correspondent for the UEFA Champions League and Europa League for CBS Sports. Conrad is an avid supporter of Premier League side Newcastle United.

== Honors ==
=== College ===
UCLA

- NCAA College Cup: 1997

=== Club ===
San Diego Surf

- Under-20 Club Championship: 1997

San Jose Earthquakes

- MLS Cup: 2001

Kansas City Wizards

- U.S. Open Cup: 2004

=== International ===
United States

- CONCACAF Gold Cup: 2005

=== Individual ===
- MLS Defender of the Year: 2005
- MLS Best XI: 2004, 2005, 2006, 2008
- MLS Humanitarian of the Year: 2009
