= 2005 D.C. United season =

D.C. United
2005 season
- Owner: D.C. United Holdings
- Head coach: Piotr Nowak
- MLS: 3rd
- MLS Cup Playoffs: Conference semifinals
- U.S. Open Cup: Quarterfinals
- CONCACAF Champions' Cup: Semifinals
- Copa Sudamericana: Round of 16
- Carolina Challenge Cup: Runners-up
- Atlantic Cup: Winners
- Top goalscorer: League: All: Eskandarian (10)
Home colors	Away colors

The 2005 season was the ninth season in D.C. United history, as well as their ninth season in Major League Soccer, the top tier of American soccer. The season covers the period from November 15, 2004, through October 30, 2005.

Under Piotr Nowak's tenure as head coach, this was the first and only season where he did not lead D.C. United to a trophy of any kind. D.C. United entered the season as the defending MLS Cup champions defeating Kansas City Wizards 3–2 in last season's championship. During Nowak's second season as head coach, he led the team to a slightly better regular season record, finishing third in the overall standings.

D.C. United made their first appearance in the CONCACAF Champions' Cup (now Champions League) for the first time in three years, earning qualification through winning the 2004 MLS Cup championship. In the continental tournament, D.C. United were the only American club to reach the semifinals of the tournament before losing to Mexico's UNAM Pumas 6–1 on aggregate.

In other external competitions, United finished as runners-up in the preseason Carolina Challenge Cup, reached the quarterfinals of the U.S. Open Cup and won the Atlantic Cup rivalry series against MetroStars.

== Background ==
D.C. United entered the 2005 season as the defending MLS Cup champions, earning their first league championship since 1999. During the 2004 MLS regular season, United finished second in the Eastern Conference table and fourth in the overall regular standings. Their playoff run included a 4–0 aggregate series victory over their Atlantic Cup rivals, MetroStars in the conference semifinals. In the conference final, United defeated the Eastern Conference regular season champions, New England Revolution in a penalty shoot-out, after a 3–3 draw in regulation and extra time. Their playoff campaign culminated in MLS Cup 2004 defeating Kansas City Wizards 3–2 in the final.

== Match results ==
=== Legend ===
Win	Loss	Tie

=== Carolina Challenge Cup ===
Game	Date	Opponents	Venue	Result	Score F–A	Goalscorers	Attendance	Ref
1	March 19, 2005	San Jose Earthquakes	N	L	0–2			
2	March 23, 2005	Charleston Battery	A	T	2–2	Moreno, Quintanilla		
3	March 25, 2005	Columbus Crew	N	W	3–0	Gomez (2), Moreno		

=== CONCACAF Champions' Cup ===
Round	Leg	Date	Opponents	Venue	Result	Score F–A	Goalscorers	Attendance	Ref
QF	1	March 9, 2005	(Jamaica) Harbour View	H	W	2–1	Eskandarian, Gros	3,825	
QF	2	March 16, 2005	(Jamaica) Harbour View	A	W	2–1	Walker, Moreno	600	
SF	1	April 6, 2005	(Mexico) UNAM	H	T	1–1	Gómez	21,185	
SF	2	April 13, 2005	(Mexico) UNAM	A	L	0–5		22,000	

=== Major League Soccer ===
==== Regular season ====
D.C. United recorded the fifth highest average attendance during the 2005 Major League Soccer season.

Regular season results source

Game	Date	Opponents	Venue	Result	Score F–A	Goalscorers	Attendance	Ref
1	April 2, 2005	Chivas USA	A	W	2–0	Gros, Gómez	18,493	
2	April 9, 2005	Chicago Fire	H	T	1–1	Petke	19,052	
3	April 15, 2005	Columbus Crew	A	L	0–1		12,449	
4	April 23, 2005	New England Revolution	H	L	3–4	Moreno (2), Quaranta	13,691	
5	April 30, 2005	Kansas City Wizards	A	T	0–0		12,008	
6	May 7, 2005	Columbus Crew	H	W	3–1		14,894	
7	May 14, 2005	New England Revolution	A	L	0–1		13,662	
8	May 21, 2005	Kansas City Wizards	H	W	3–2		18,731	
9	May 28, 2005	FC Dallas	H	L	0–2		16,684	
10	June 4, 2005	San Jose Earthquakes	A	T	0–0		11,989	
11	June 12, 2005	MetroStars	A	T	0–0		15,125	
12	June 15, 2005	Chicago Fire	H	W	4–3		14,198	
13	June 18, 2005	New England Revolution	H	W	2–0		17,611	
14	June 29, 2005	Chicago Fire	A	L	3–4		8,202	
15	July 2, 2005	Columbus Crew	A	W	1–0	Marshall (o.g.)	12,988	
16	July 9, 2005	Kansas City Wizards	H	L	0–1		18,379	
17	July 15, 2005	San Jose Earthquakes	H	W	3–0		13,978	
18	July 20, 2005	Kansas City Wizards	A	D	1–1		7,560	
19	July 23, 2005	Los Angeles Galaxy	A	W	1–0		27,000	
20	August 6, 2005	Chicago Fire	A	W	3–2		14,478	
21	August 10, 2005	MetroStars	H	W	3–0		11,883	
22	August 13, 2005	Chivas USA	H	W	3–0		16,169	
23	August 20, 2005	Los Angeles Galaxy	H	L	2–3		16,863	
24	August 27, 2005	New England Revolution	A	L	1–2		18,049	
25	August 31, 2005	Real Salt Lake	A	W	5–1		11,455	
26	September 3, 2005	Colorado Rapids	A	L	0–1		17,044	
27	September 10, 2005	FC Dallas	A	W	2–1		1,308	

==== Playoffs ====
Round	Leg	Date	Opponents	Venue	Result	Score F–A	Goalscorers	Attendance	Ref
Conf. SF	1	October 21, 2005	Chicago Fire	A	T	0–0			
Conf. SF	2	October 30, 2005	Chicago Fire	H	L	0–4		20,089	

=== U.S. Open Cup ===
Round	Date	Opponents	Venue	Result	Score F–A	Goalscorers	Attendance	Ref
R4	August 3, 2005	Richmond Kickers	A	W	3–1	Adu, Gómez (2)	8,412	
QF	August 24, 2005	FC Dallas	H	L	1–1 (1–4 pen.)	Gómez	4,258	

=== Copa Sudamericana ===
Round	Leg	Date	Opponents	Venue	Result	Score F–A	Goalscorers	Attendance	Ref
R16	1	September 17, 2005	(Chile) Universidad Católica	H	T	1–1	Walker		
R16	2	September 23, 2005	(Chile) Universidad Católica	A	L	2–3	Gomez (2)	14,118	

== League standings ==
=== Conference ===
Eastern Conference regular season champion^{2}
Qualify for 2005 MLS Cup Playoffs

Pos	Club	GP	W	L	T	GF	GA	GD	Pts
1	New England Revolution	32	17	7	8	55	37	18	59
2	D.C. United	32	16	10	6	58	37	21	54
3	Chicago Fire	32	15	13	4	49	50	-1	49
4	MetroStars	32	12	9	11	53	49	4	47
5	Kansas City Wizards	32	11	9	12	52	44	8	45
6	Columbus Crew	32	11	16	5	34	45	-11	38

^{1}Earns top-seed in MLS Cup Playoffs

=== Overall ===
MLS Supporters' Shield, Western Conference regular season champion^{1}
Eastern Conference regular season champion^{2}
Qualify for 2005 MLS Cup Playoffs

Pos	Club	GP	W	L	T	GF	GA	GD	Pts
1	San Jose Earthquakes	32	18	4	10	53	31	22	64
2	New England Revolution	32	17	7	8	55	37	18	59
3	D.C. United	32	16	10	6	58	37	21	54
4	Chicago Fire	32	15	13	4	49	50	-1	49
5	FC Dallas	32	13	10	9	52	44	8	48
6	MetroStars	32	12	9	11	53	49	4	47
7	Kansas City Wizards	32	11	9	12	52	44	8	45
8	Colorado Rapids	32	13	13	6	40	37	3	45
9	Los Angeles Galaxy	32	13	13	6	44	45	-1	45
10	Columbus Crew	32	11	16	5	34	45	-11	38
11	Real Salt Lake	32	5	22	5	30	65	-35	20
12	Chivas USA	32	4	22	6	31	67	-36	18

Notes

- Note 1: The San Jose Earthquakes earn the top-seed in the Western Conference bracket of the MLS Cup Playoffs.
- Note 2: The Columbus Crew earn the top-seed in the Eastern Conference bracket of the MLS Cup Playoffs.

== Player details ==
No.	Pos	Nat	Player	Total		MLS		MLS Cup Playoffs		CONCACAF Champions' Cup		U.S. Open Cup			
No.	Pos	Nat	Player	Apps	Goals	Apps	Goals	Apps	Goals	Apps	Goals	Apps	Goals		
1	GK	(United States) USA	Troy Perkins	0	0	0+0	0	0+0	0	0+0	0	0+0	0	0+0	0
2	DF	(United States) USA	David Stokes	0	0	0+0	0	0+0	0	0+0	0	0+0	0	0+0	0
4	DF	(United States) USA	Brandon Prideaux	0	0	0+0	0	0+0	0	0+0	0	0+0	0	0+0	0
5	DF	(Argentina) ARG	Facundo Erpen	0	1	0+0	1	0+0	0	0+0	0	0+0	0	0+0	0
6	MF	(United States) USA	Nick Van Sicklen	0	0	0+0	0	0+0	0	0+0	0	0+0	0	0+0	0
9	FW	(United States) USA	Freddy Adu	0	4	0+0	4	0+0	0	0+0	0	0+0	0	0+0	0
10	MF	(Argentina) ARG	Christian Gomez	0	12	0+0	11	0+0	0	0+0	1	0+0	0	0+0	0
11	FW	(United States) USA	Alecko Eskandarian	0	1	0+0	0	0+0	0	0+0	0	0+0	1	0+0	0
13	DF	(United States) USA	Tim Merritt	0	0	0+0	0	0+0	0	0+0	0	0+0	0	0+0	0
14	MF	(United States) USA	Ben Olsen	0	2	0+0	2	0+0	0	0+0	0	0+0	0	0+0	0
15	DF	(United States) USA	Kenny Arena	0	0	0+0	0	0+0	0	0+0	0	0+0	0	0+0	0
16	MF	(United States) USA	Brian Carroll	0	1	0+0	1	0+0	0	0+0	0	0+0	0	0+0	0
17	MF	(United States) USA	Joshua Gros	0	5	0+0	4	0+0	0	0+0	0	0+0	1	0+0	0
18	GK	(United States) USA	Nick Rimando	0	0	0+0	0	0+0	0	0+0	0	0+0	0	0+0	0
19	MF	(United States) USA	Clyde Simms	0	0	0+0	0	0+0	0	0+0	0	0+0	0	0+0	0
21	MF	(Ukraine) UKR	Dema Kovalenko	0	4	0+0	4	0+0	0	0+0	0	0+0	0	0+0	0
22	FW	(United States) USA	Jason Thompson	0	0	0+0	0	0+0	0	0+0	0	0+0	0	0+0	0
23	MF	(United States) USA	Jamil Walker	0	3	0+0	2	0+0	0	0+0	1	0+0	0	0+0	0
24	MF	(Ghana) GHA	Nana Kuffour	0	1	0+0	1	0+0	0	0+0	0	0+0	0	0+0	0
25	FW	(United States) USA	Santino Quaranta	0	5	0+0	5	0+0	0	0+0	0	0+0	0	0+0	0
26	DF	(United States) USA	Bryan Namoff	0	1	0+0	1	0+0	0	0+0	0	0+0	0	0+0	0
27	DF	(United States) USA	John Wilson	0	0	0+0	0	0+0	0	0+0	0	0+0	0	0+0	0
28	DF	(United States) USA	Shawn Kuykendall	0	0	0+0	0	0+0	0	0+0	0	0+0	0	0+0	0
29	FW	(United States) USA	Matt Nickell	0	0	0+0	0	0+0	0	0+0	0	0+0	0	0+0	0
30	GK	(United States) USA	Andrew Weber	0	0	0+0	0	0+0	0	0+0	0	0+0	0	0+0	0
31	MF	(Jamaica) JAM	Stephen deRoux	0	0	0+0	0	0+0	0	0+0	0	0+0	0	0+0	0
32	DF	(United States) USA	Bobby Boswell	0	3	0+0	3	0+0	0	0+0	0	0+0	0	0+0	0
99	FW	(Bolivia) BOL	Jaime Moreno	0	17	0+0	16	0+0	0	0+0	1	0+0	0	0+0	0

== Transfers ==
All transactions sourced to: "MLSnet.com: Transactions". Major League Soccer. D.C. United. April 3, 2005. Archived from the original on February 6, 2006.

=== In ===
Date	Pos	Name	From	Fee/notes	Ref.
January 14, 2005	MF	Nick Van Sicklen	Wisconsin Badgers	Drafted in the 2005 MLS SuperDraft second round	
January 14, 2005	DF	Tim Merritt	North Carolina Tar Heels	Drafted in the 2005 MLS SuperDraft fourth round	
February 4, 2005	FW	Matt Nickell	Drake Bulldogs	Drafted in the 2005 MLS Supplemental Draft first round	
February 4, 2005	GK	Andrew Terris	Stanford Cardinal	Drafted in the 2005 MLS Supplemental Draft third round	
February 4, 2005	MF	Shawn Kuykendall	American Eagles	Drafted in the 2005 MLS Supplemental Draft fourth round	

=== Out ===
Date	Pos	Name	To	Fee/notes	Ref.
November 19, 2004	MF	Ezra Hendrickson	Chivas USA	Acquired through 2004 MLS Expansion Draft	
November 19, 2004	FW	Thiago Martins	Chivas USA	Acquired through 2004 MLS Expansion Draft	
November 19, 2004	MF	Kevin Ara	Real Salt Lake	Acquired through 2004 MLS Expansion Draft	
January 20, 2005	MF	Doug Warren	New England Revolution	Traded for fourth round pick in the 2006 MLS SuperDraft	
April 4, 2005	POS	Tim Laweson	No club	Waived	
May 23, 2005	DF	Mike Petke	Colorado Rapids	Traded for Chris Henderson	
May 24, 2005	MF	Chris Henderson	Columbus Crew	Traded to Columbus for partial allocation money	
May 24, 2005	GK	Andrew Terris	None	Released	
