= List of D.C. United seasons =

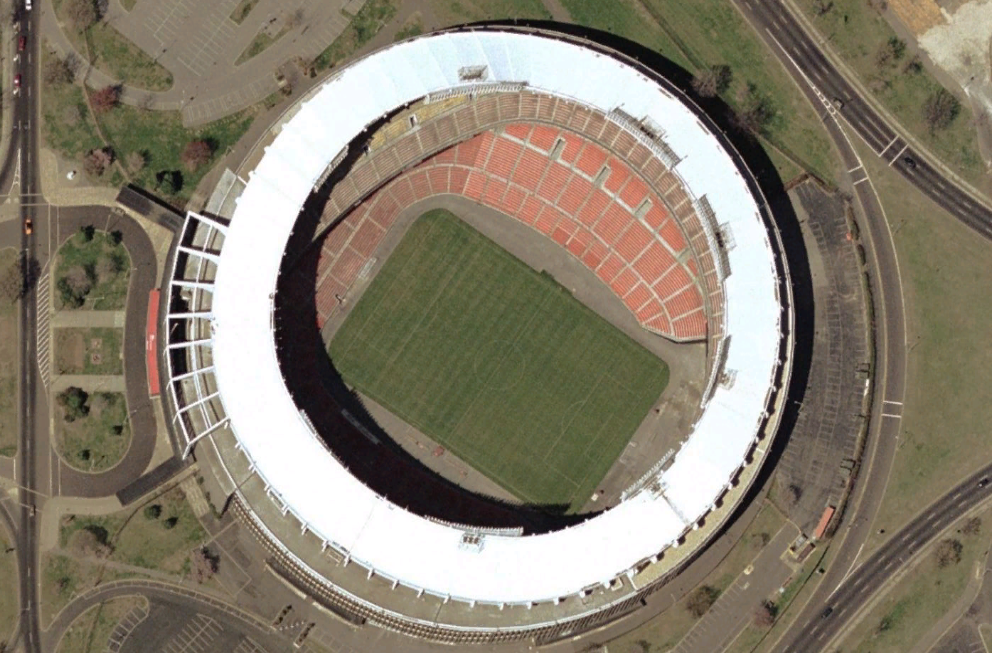
United played at RFK Stadium in Washington, D.C., from 1996 through the 2017 season. The stadium is pictured in 2004.

D.C. United is an American professional soccer club based in Washington, D.C. that competes in Major League Soccer (MLS), the top tier professional soccer league in the United States and Canada. It is one of the ten charter clubs of MLS, having competed in the league since its inception, in 1996. Over the club's history, D.C. United has been considered to be the flagship franchise of MLS winning 13 international and domestic titles. Domestically, United has won the U.S. Open Cup thrice, and holds an MLS record for most MLS Cup and MLS Supporters' Shields apiece, winning each honor four times. United was also the first club to win both the Supporters' Shield and MLS Cup consecutively.

On the international stage, D.C. United has competed in both the CONCACAF Champions League and its predecessor the CONCACAF Champions' Cup. The club is also the only American soccer club to ever compete in a CONMEBOL competition, participating in the 2005 and 2007 editions of the Copa Sudamericana. In 1998, the club won the CONCACAF Champions' Cup. Subsequently, United won the now-defunct Copa Interamericana, a competition between the CONCACAF on CONMEBOL champion that year to determine the best soccer club in the Americas. In the 1998, and final edition of the Copa Interamericana, D.C. United defeated Vasco da Gama of Brazil to take the title.

== Key ==
Key to competitions

- Major League Soccer (MLS) – The top-flight of soccer in the United States, established in 1996.
- U.S. Open Cup (USOC) – The premier knockout cup competition in U.S. soccer, first contested in 1914.
- CONCACAF Champions League (CCL) – The premier competition in North American soccer since 1962. It went by the name of Champions' Cup until 2008.

Key to colors and symbols

1st or W	Winners
2nd or RU	Runners-up
3rd	Third place
Last	Wooden Spoon
♦	MLS Golden Boot
	Highest average attendance
Italics	Ongoing competition

Key to league record

- Season = The year and article of the season
- Div = Division/level on pyramid
- League = League name
- Pld = Games played
- W = Games won
- L = Games lost
- D = Games drawn
- GF = Goals for
- GA = Goals against
- GD = Goal difference
- Pts = Points
- PPG = Points per game
- Conf. = Conference position
- Overall = League position

Key to cup record

- DNE = Did not enter
- DNQ = Did not qualify
- NH = Competition not held or canceled
- QR = Qualifying round
- PR = Preliminary round
- GS = Group stage
- R1 = First round
- R2 = Second round
- R3 = Third round
- R4 = Fourth round
- R5 = Fifth round
- Ro16 = Round of 16
- QF = Quarterfinals
- SF = Semifinals
- F = Final
- RU = Runners-up
- W = Winners

== Seasons ==
Season	League									Position		Playoffs	USOC	Continental			Inter- continental	Average attendance (Note: Average attendance only includes statistics from regular season matches.)	Top goalscorer(s) (Note: Top goalscorer(s) includes all goals scored in the regular season, MLS Cup Playoffs, U.S. Open Cup, MLS is Back Tournament, CONCACAF Champions League, FIFA Club World Cup, and other competitive continental matches.)	
Season	Pld	W	L	D	GF	GA	GD	Pts	PPG	Conf.	Overall	Playoffs	USOC	CCL	LC	Other(s)	Inter- continental	Average attendance	Name(s)	Goals
1996	32	16	16	0	62	56	+6	46	1.44	2nd	3rd	W	W	DNE	NH	–	DNQ	15,262	(El Salvador) Raúl Díaz Arce	24
1997	32	21	11	0	70	53	+17	55	1.72	1st	1st	W	RU	SF	NH	–	DNQ	16,698	(Bolivia) Jaime Moreno	17
1998	32	24	8	0	74	48	+26	58	1.81	1st	2nd	RU	DNQ	W	NH	–	Copa Interamericana (W)	16,077	(United States) Roy Lassiter	18
1999	32	23	9	0	65	43	+22	57	1.78	1st	1st	W	Ro16	3rd	NH	–	DNQ	17,419	(United States) Roy Lassiter	18
2000	32	8	18	6	44	63	–19	30	0.94	4th	11th	DNQ	QF	4th	NH	–	DNQ	18,580	(Bolivia) Jaime Moreno	12
2001	26	8	16	2	42	50	−8	26	1.00	4th	10th	DNQ	SF	NH	NH	Giants Cup (RU)	DNQ	21,518	(Sierra Leone) Abdul Conteh	14
2002	28	9	14	5	31	40	−9	32	1.14	5th	10th	DNQ	DNQ	Ro16	NH	–	DNQ	16,519	(United States) Ali Curtis (United States) Bobby Convey	5
2003	30	10	11	9	38	36	+2	39	1.30	4th	7th	QF	SF	DNQ	NH	–	DNQ	15,565	(United States) Dema Kovalenko (Bolivia) Marco Etcheverry	6
2004	30	11	10	9	43	42	+1	42	1.31	2nd	4th	W	Ro16	DNQ	NH	–	DNQ	17,232	(United States) Alecko Eskandarian	14
2005	32	16	10	6	58	37	+21	54	1.69	2nd	3rd	QF	QF	SF	NH	–	Copa Sudamericana (Ro16)	16,664	(Bolivia) Jaime Moreno	17
2006	32	15	7	10	52	38	+14	55	1.72	1st	1st	SF	SF	DNQ	NH	–	DNQ	18,251	(Argentina) Christian Gómez	16
2007	30	16	7	7	56	34	+22	55	1.83	1st	1st	QF	Ro16	SF	NH	SuperLiga (SF)	Copa Sudamericana (Ro16)	20,967	(Brazil) Luciano Emilio	24♦ (Note: Emilio won the MLS Golden Boot (20 goals))
2008	30	11	15	4	43	51	−8	37	1.23	6th	10th	DNQ	W	SF	NH	SuperLiga (GS)	DNQ	19,835	(Brazil) Luciano Emilio	16
2009	30	9	8	13	43	44	−1	40	1.33	4th	10th	DNQ	RU	GS	NH	–	DNQ	10,053	(Brazil) Luciano Emilio	13
2010	30	6	20	4	21	47	−26	22	0.73	8th	16th	DNQ	SF	GS	NH	–	DNQ	14,532	(Australia) Danny Allsopp	8
2011	34	9	13	12	49	52	−3	39	1.15	6th	13th	DNQ	QR2	DNQ	NH	–	DNQ	15,181	(Canada) Dwayne De Rosario	13♦ (Note: De Rosario won the MLS Golden Boot (1 goal for Toronto, 2 goals for Red Bulls, 13 goals for D.C.))
2012	34	17	10	7	53	43	+10	58	1.71	2nd	3rd	SF	Ro16	DNQ	NH	–	DNQ	13,846	(United States) Chris Pontius	12
2013	34	3	24	7	22	59	−37	16	0.47	10th	19th	DNQ	W	DNQ	NH	–	DNQ	13,646	(Canada) Dwayne de Rosario	8
2014	34	17	9	8	52	37	+15	59	1.74	1st	3rd	QF	R3	DNQ	NH	–	DNQ	17,030	(Argentina) Fabian Espindola	8
2015	34	15	13	6	43	45	−2	51	1.50	4th	8th	QF	Ro16	QF	NH	–	DNQ	19,371	(Costa Rica) Jairo Arrieta	9
2016	34	11	10	13	53	47	+6	46	1.35	4th	10th	R1	Ro16	QF	NH	–	DNQ	17,081	(United States) Lamar Neagle	9
2017	34	9	20	5	31	60	−29	32	0.94	11th	21st	DNQ	Ro16	DNQ	NH	–	DNQ	17,904	(Argentina) Luciano Acosta	5
2018	34	14	11	9	60	50	+10	51	1.50	4th	9th	R1	Ro16	DNQ	NH	–	DNQ	17,635	(England) Wayne Rooney	12
2019	34	13	11	10	42	38	+4	50	1.47	5th	10th	R1	Ro16	DNQ	DNE	–	DNQ	17,744	(England) Wayne Rooney	13
2020	23	5	12	6	25	41	−16	21	0.91	13th	24th	DNQ	NH	DNQ	Ro16 / NH	–	DNQ	17,058	(Norway) Ola Kamara	5
2021	34	14	15	5	56	54	+2	47	1.38	8th	16th	DNQ	NH	DNQ	DNQ	–	DNQ	12,791	(Norway) Ola Kamara	19
2022	34	7	21	6	36	71	−35	27	0.87	14th	28th	DNQ	R4	DNQ	DNQ	–	DNQ	16,256	(Greece) Taxiarchis Fountas	12
2023	34	10	14	10	45	49	−4	40	1.18	12th	23rd	DNQ	R4	DNQ	Ro32	–	DNQ	17,540	(Belgium) Christian Benteke	14
2024	34	10	14	10	52	70	–18	40	1.18	10th	21st	DNQ	DNQ	DNQ	Ro32	–	DNQ	18,137	(Belgium) Christian Benteke	25♦
2025	34	5	18	11	30	66	–36	26	0.76	15th	30th	DNQ	QF	DNQ	DNQ	–	DNQ	16,389	(Belgium) Christian Benteke	9
Total	957	362	394	201	1,391	1,464	+-73	1,251	1.31	—	—	—	—	—	—	—	—	—	(Bolivia) Jaime Moreno	162
