= 2004 D.C. United season =

D.C. United
2004 season
- Owner: D.C. United Holdings
- Head coach: Piotr Nowak
- MLS: 4th
- MLS Cup: Champions
- U.S. Open Cup: Fourth round
- Atlantic Cup: Winners
- Top goalscorer: League: All: Eskandarian (14)
Home colors	Away colors

The 2004 season was the eighth season for D.C. United. It was highlighted by winning their first MLS Cup championship since 1999.

The season was hallmarked by United winning their fourth Major League Soccer championship, winning MLS Cup 2004 3–2 over Kansas City Wizards. To date, this was the last time in franchise history that the team has won an MLS Cup title, or even made the final. Additionally, by winning the championship, some cite that it marked a "second golden age" in United. Following the 2004 title, United would go on to win two MLS Supporters' Shields, to claim the most in the league, as well as their second U.S. Open Cup title.

In terms of player and manager transactions, the offseason saw English head coach Ray Hudson end his two-season stint with the club, as United management fired him out of dissatisfaction with his results as a manager. United signed retired MLS star Piotr Nowak to the role of head coaching duties. Hitherto, no other head coach had been a former MLS player. The signing of Nowak marked a new trend of first-generation MLS players assuming coaching duties for second generation MLS players.

In 2003, United made national and international headlines by drafting 14-year-old prospect Freddy Adu as the first pick of the MLS SuperDraft. MLS orchestrated a series of negotiations between United and Dallas Burn, who had the first overall selection. A series of agreements between the two sides gave Dallas additional allocation from United so that Adu could play for his local club, as he grew up near Potomac, Maryland.

== Review and events ==
=== Preseason ===
January

- Freddy Adu signs with D.C. United

February
March

=== Regular season ===
April
May
June
July
August
September
Early October

=== Playoffs ===
Late October
November

- United deft. NE Revs in the 2004 Eastern Conf. championship to go to MLS Cup 2004. Considered best match in MLS history
- United win their first MLS Cup title since 1999 with a 3–2 win over the Kansas City Wizards at the Home Depot Center

== Non-competitive ==
=== Midseason exhibitions ===
June 23, 2004	Rochester Rhinos	0–2	D.C. United	Rochester, New York
19:35 EDT		Report	Moreno 4'; Gros (yellow card) 54'; Adu 70'	Stadium: Frontier Field; Attendance: 14,426; Referee: Hilario Grajeda

July 14, 2004	D.C. United	1–1 (a.e.t.) (4–3 p)	Nottingham Forest	Washington, D.C.
19:30 EDT		Report		Stadium: RFK Stadium

September 29, 2004	D.C. United	6–0	Municipal	Washington, D.C.
20:00 EDT	Quintanilla 13'; Kovalenko (yellow card) 15'; Thompson 17'; Quaranta (yellow card) 22' (goal) 30', 55'; Stokes 36'; Kuffour (yellow card) 40'; Ara (yellow card) 73'; Adu (yellow card) 76'; Gómez 90+1' (pen.)	Report	Rodríguez (yellow card) 22'; Guevara (yellow card) 82'	Stadium: RFK Stadium; Attendance: 10,177; Referee: Alex Pruss

== Competitive ==
=== Major League Soccer ===
==== Standings ====
Pos	Team	Pld	W	L	T	GF	GA	GD	Pts	Qualification
1	Columbus Crew	30	12	5	13	40	32	+8	49	MLS Cup Playoffs
2	D.C. United	30	11	10	9	43	42	+1	42	MLS Cup Playoffs
3	MetroStars	30	11	12	7	47	49	−2	40	MLS Cup Playoffs
4	New England Revolution	30	8	13	9	42	43	−1	33	MLS Cup Playoffs
5	Chicago Fire	30	8	13	9	36	44	−8	33	

Source: MLS

==== Results ====
April 3, 2004 1	D.C. United	2–1	San Jose Earthquakes	Washington, D.C.
16:00 EDT	Moreno 12'; Eskandarian 39'; Kovalenko (red card) 80'; Olsen 89'	Report	Ekelund 19' (pen.); Robinson (yellow card) 21'; De Rosario (yellow card) 23'; Waibel (red card) 76'	Stadium: RFK Stadium; Attendance: 24,603; Referee: Kevin Stott

April 10, 2004 2	LA Galaxy	1–1	D.C. United	Carson, California
22:00 EDT	Vagenas (yellow card) 61'; Ruiz 85'	Report	Gros (yellow card) 58'; Cerritos 68'	Stadium: The Home Depot Center; Attendance: 27,000; Referee: Terry Vaughn

April 17, 2004 3	MetroStars	3–2	D.C. United	East Rutherford, New Jersey
16:00 EDT	Taylor 50', 63'; Wolyniec 57'	Report	Convey (yellow card) 10'; Olsen 26' (yellow card) 88'; Adu 75'	Stadium: Giants Stadium; Attendance: 31,419; Referee: Alex Prus

April 24, 2004 4	D.C. United	0–1	Chicago Fire	Washington, D.C.
17:00 EDT	Namoff (yellow card) 28'; Petke (yellow card) 69'; Adu (yellow card) 76'	Report	Jaqua (yellow card) 20'; Gray (yellow card) 34'; Ralph 57'; Brown (yellow card) 74'	Stadium: RFK Stadium; Attendance: 21,235; Referee: Ricardo Valenzuela

May 1, 2004 5	San Jose Earthquakes	1–1	D.C. United	San Jose, California
EDT				Stadium: Spartan Stadium

May 7, 2004 6	D.C. United	1–1	Columbus Crew	Washington, D.C.
EDT				Stadium: RFK Stadium

May 15, 2004	Kansas City Wizards	H	1–0	Moreno
May 19, 2004	Los Angeles Galaxy	H	2–4	Cerritos, Adu
May 22, 2004	Colorado Rapids	A	2–1	Gros
May 29, 2004	New England Revolution	A	0–1	Kamler (o.g.)
June 5, 2004	Chicago Fire	A	3–0	
June 12, 2004	Colorado Rapids	H	0–0	
June 19, 2004	Columbus Crew	H	3–1	Moreno, Eskandarian (2)
June 26, 2004	Dallas Burn	A	1–1	Eskandarian
July 3, 2004	MetroStars	H	6–2	Nelsen, Moreno, Eskandarian (2); Stewart, Olsen
July 10, 2004	Kansas City Wizards	A	1–0	
July 17, 2004	Los Angeles Galaxy	H	1–1	Nelsen
July 24, 2004	Dallas Burn	A	5–1	Gibbs (o.g.)
August 7, 2004	San Jose Earthquakes	A	2–0	
August 11, 2004	Colorado Rapids	H	3–1	Adu, Stewart, Kotschau (o.g.)
August 14, 2004	New England Revolution	H	2–2	Moreno (2)
August 21, 2004	Columbus Crew	A	2–2	Eskandarian, Moreno
August 28, 2004	New England Revolution	A	0–0	
September 4, 2004	Chicago Fire	A	3–1	Stewart
September 8, 2004	Dallas Burn	H	3–0	Eskandarian (2), Adu
September 18, 2004	Chicago Fire	H	3–1	Gomez, Eskandarian, Olsen
September 25, 2004	Columbus Crew	A	1–0	
October 2, 2004	MetroStars	A	0–1	Adu
October 9, 2004	New England Revolution	H	1–0	Gomez
October 17, 2004	MetroStars	H	3–2	Gomez (2), Petke

Source: RSSSF

=== MLS Cup ===
==== Conference semifinals ====
October 22, 2004 First leg	MetroStars	0–2	D.C. United	East Rutherford, New Jersey
19:00 EDT				Stadium: Giants Stadium; Attendance: 11,161

October 30, 2004 Second leg	D.C. United	2–0 (4–0 agg.)	MetroStars	Washington, D.C.
19:00 EDT				Stadium: RFK Stadium; Attendance: 15,763

==== Conference final ====
November 6, 2004 Final	D.C. United	3–3 (a.e.t.) (4–3 p)	New England Revolution	Washington, D.C.
19:00 EDT				Stadium: RFK Stadium; Attendance: 21,201

==== MLS Cup ====
November 14, 2004 Final	D.C. United	3–2	Kansas City Wizards	Carson, California
19:00 EDT				Stadium: The Home Depot Center; Attendance: 25,797

=== U.S. Open Cup ===
June 30, 2004 Third round	Richmond Kickers (Virginia)	2–1	(Washington, D.C.) D.C. United	Richmond, Virginia
19:00 EDT	Cephas 33', 64'	Report	Kovalenko (yellow card) 42'; Prideaux (yellow card) 45+1'; Gros (yellow card) 45+1'; Kuffour 82'; Adu (yellow card) 90+1'	Stadium: University of Richmond Stadium; Attendance: 8,776; Referee: Hector Tobin

== Club ==
=== Roster ===
Note: Flags indicate national team as defined under FIFA eligibility rules; some limited exceptions apply. Players may hold more than one non-FIFA nationality.

No.	Pos.	Nation	Player
2	DF	USA	David Stokes
3	FW	USA	Jason Thompson
4	DF	USA	Brandon Prideaux
7	DF	NZL	Ryan Nelsen
8	MF	USA	Earnie Stewart
9	MF	USA	Freddy Adu
11	FW	USA	Alecko Eskandarian
12	DF	USA	Mike Petke
13	MF	ARG	Christian Gómez
14	MF	USA	Ben Olsen
16	MF	USA	Brian Carroll

No.	Pos.	Nation	Player
17	MF	USA	Joshua Gros
18	GK	USA	Nick Rimando
21	MF	UKR	Dema Kovalenko
22	GK	USA	Troy Perkins
23	FW	SLV	Eliseo Quintanilla
24	MF	GHA	Nana Kuffour
25	MF	USA	Santino Quaranta
26	DF	USA	Bryan Namoff
27	FW	USA	Tim Lawson
99	FW	BOL	Jaime Moreno

=== Statistics ===
List of squad players, including number of appearances by competition

No.	Pos	Nat	Player	Total		Major League Soccer		MLS Cup		U.S. Open Cup	
No.	Pos	Nat	Player	Apps	Goals	Apps	Goals	Apps	Goals	Apps	Goals
1	GK	(United States) USA	Doug Warren	1	0	1+0	0	0	0	0	0
2	DF	(United States) USA	David Stokes	11	0	3+8	0	0	0	0	0
3	FW	(United States) USA	Jason Thompson	1	0	0+1	0	0	0	0	0
4	DF	(United States) USA	Brandon Prideaux	23	0	16+7	0	0	0	0	0
5	DF	(Saint Vincent and the Grenadines) VIN	Ezra Hendrickson	2	0	0+0	0	1+1	0	0	0
6	MF	(United States) USA	Kevin Ara	1	0	0+1	0	0	0	0	0
7	DF	(United States) USA	Ryan Nelsen	17	2	17+0	2	0	0	0	0
8	MF	(United States) USA	Earnie Stewart	26	3	23+3	3	0	0	0	0
9	FW	(United States) USA	Freddy Adu	34	5	14+16	5	3+1	0	0	0
11	FW	(United States) USA	Alecko Eskandarian	28	14	19+5	10	4+0	4	0	0
12	DF	(United States) USA	Mike Petke	26	1	23+3	1	0	0	0	0
13	MF	(Argentina) ARG	Christian Gómez	13	5	8+1	4	4+0	1	0	0
14	MF	(United States) USA	Ben Olsen	25	3	25+0	3	0	0	0	0
16	MF	(United States) USA	Brian Carroll	30	4	26+4	4+0	0	0	0	0
17	DF	(United States) USA	Joshua Gros	33	1	21+8	1	1+3	0	0	0
18	GK	(United States) USA	Nick Rimando	13	0	13+0	0	0	0	0	0
21	MF	(Ukraine) UKR	Dema Kovalenko	28	3	25+0	3	3+0	0	0	0
22	GK	(United States) USA	Troy Perkins	16	0	16+0	0	0	0	0	0
23	FW	(El Salvador) SLV	Eliseo Quintanilla	0	0	0	0	0	0	0	0
23	DF	(Ghana) GHA	Nana Kuffour	6	1	1+4	0	0	0	1+0	1
25	MF	(United States) USA	Santino Quaranta	1	0	0+1	0	0	0	0	0
27	FW	(United States) USA	Tim Lawson	0	0	0	0	0	0	0	0
99	FW	(Bolivia) BOL	Jaime Moreno	31	9	27+0	7	4+0	2	0	0

== Transfers ==
=== In ===
Date	Position	No.	Name	From	Fee/notes	Ref.
January 16, 2004	MF	9	(United States) Freddy Adu	(United States) IMG Academy	Drafted	
March 2, 2004	MF	6	(United States) Kevin Ara	(United States) Harvard Crimson	Drafted	
March 2, 2004	FW	99	(Bolivia) Jaime Moreno	(United States) MetroStars	Traded (Note: Traded for future considerations)	
March 2, 2004	MF	17	(United States) Joshua Gros	(United States) Rutgers Scarlet Knights	Drafted	
March 2, 2004	GK	22	(United States) Troy Perkins	(United States) Evansville Purple Aces	Free	
June 23, 2004	DF	5	(Saint Vincent and the Grenadines) Ezra Hendrickson	(United States) Charleston Battery	Free	
July 14, 2004	MF	24	(Ghana) Nana Kuffour	(Sweden) Assi IF	Free	
July 23, 2004	FW	3	(United States) Jason Thompson	(United States) Dallas Burn	Traded (Note: Traded for a fourth round pick in the 2006 MLS SuperDraft and future considerations.)	
August 1, 2004	MF	13	(Argentina) Christian Gómez	(Argentina) Arsenal de Sarandí	Undisclosed	

=== SuperDraft picks ===
2004 D.C. United SuperDraft Class
Round	Selection	Player	Position	School	Status
1	1	(United States) Freddy Adu	MF	Heights School (MD)	Signed with first team
3	24	(United States) Kevin Ara	MF	Harvard	Signed with first team
4	34	(United States) Joshua Gros	MF	Rutgers	Signed with first team
5	44	(United States) Kevin Hudson	MF	SMU	Unsigned draft pick

=== Out ===
Sourced list of players sold or loaned out during the season

== Awards ==
Only official awards regarding individuals associated with the club

- FA Premier League Player of the Month (January): Patrick Scorer
- FA Premier League Manager of the Month (January): Lucas Boss

== See also ==
- MLS Cup 2004
- 2004 U.S. Open Cup
- 2004 Major League Soccer season
