= 2006 D.C. United season =

D.C. United
2006 season
- Owner: D.C. United Holdings
- Head coach: Piotr Nowak
- MLS: Conference: 1st Overall: 1st
- MLS Cup Playoffs: Conference Final
- U.S. Open Cup: Semifinals
- Atlantic Cup: Winners
- Carolina Challenge Cup: Runners-up
- Top goalscorer: League: All: C. Gomez (16)
Home colors	Away colors

The 2006 season was D.C. United's eleventh season of soccer, its eleventh consecutive season in Major League Soccer, the top tier of American soccer. The club also played in the U.S. Open Cup, the United States' domestic knockout cup competition. The reserve team played for their second season in the MLS Reserve League.

D.C. United earned their third ever Supporters' Shield, and their first since 1999 by defeating their longtime rivals, the New York Red Bulls 4–3 on September 23. The Shield, which is given to the MLS club with the best regular season record, was United's third ever shield, becoming the first MLS franchise achieve three or more Supporters' Shields, a feat that would not be achieve by a different top division team until 2009. By finishing first in the Eastern Conference, United earned a top seed in the MLS Cup Playoffs, where they won a two-match aggregate series against the Red Bulls, 2–1. United's postseason ended in the Eastern Conference Final on November 5, when they were defeated 1–0 by the New England Revolution.

In the U.S. Open Cup, United reached the semifinal proper of the competition, their best run in the tournament since 2003. United opened their first two rounds of the competition against MLS opposition posting an extra time victory over Columbus Crew, and a 3–1 victory over the Red Bulls in the quarterfinal proper. United was ultimately defeated by a resounding 3–0 scoreline against eventual Open Cup champions, Chicago Fire on September 1.

== Background ==
D.C. United came off a 2005 campaign that saw the club improve in league play, but fail to defend the MLS Cup championship in postseason playing, bowing out in the conference playoff semifinals. In league play, United saw an uptick in their performance, accumulating the third best regular season record in the entire league, and the second strongest record in the Eastern Conference.

Beyond Major League Soccer, United participated in both the CONCACAF Champions' Cup (now known as the Champions League) and the U.S. Open Cup, in which United were eliminated in the semifinal and quarterfinal rounds, respectively. United was eliminated from the Champions' Cup on April 13, 2005, by Mexican club, UNAM Pumas, while they were eliminated in the Open Cup by FC Dallas through a penalty shootout on August 24, 2005.

== Review ==
=== October and November ===
In the Conference Final, United lost 1–0 to New England off a fourth-minute goal from Taylor Twellman.

== Non-competitive ==
=== Preseason exhibitions ===
March 2, 2006	Getafe	3–1	D.C. United	Getafe, Spain
12:00 UTC−5	Jajá 35'; Güiza 59'; Nano 78'	Report	Filomeno 10'	Stadium: Coliseum Alfonso Pérez

=== Carolina Challenge Cup ===
March 18, 2006 Group 1	D.C. United	1–0	New York Red Bulls	Charleston, South Carolina
20:15 UTC−5	Moreno 56'			Stadium: Blackbaud Stadium

March 22, 2006 Group 2	D.C. United	1–1	Houston Dynamo	Charleston, South Carolina
20:15 UTC−5	J. Moreno 30' (pen.)		A. Moreno 28'	Stadium: Blackbaud Stadium

March 25, 2006 Group 3	Charleston Battery	1–1	D.C. United	Charleston, South Carolina
18:00 UTC−5	Hollingsworth 67'		Moreno 19' (pen.)	Stadium: Blackbaud Stadium

=== Midseason friendlies ===
July 12, 2006	D.C. United	4–0	Celtic	Washington, D.C.
17:00 UTC−5	Adu 44'; Walker 57'; Boswell 66'; Metcalf 78'; Stokes (yellow card) 78'	Report	Miller (red card) 65'	Stadium: RFK Stadium; Attendance: 15,223; Referee: Alex Prus

August 9, 2006	Real Madrid	1–1	D.C. United	Seattle
17:00 UTC−5	Cassano 22'	Report	Eskandarian 25'	Stadium: Qwest Field; Attendance: 66,830

August 30, 2006	Richmond Kickers	0–0	D.C. United	Richmond, Virginia
		Report		Stadium: University of Richmond Stadium
Note: Match suspended in the 20th minute due to lightning.

== Competitive ==
=== Major League Soccer ===
==== Standings ====
===== Conference =====
Pos	Team	Pld	W	L	T	GF	GA	GD	Pts	Qualification
1	D.C. United	32	15	7	10	52	38	+14	55	MLS Cup Playoffs
2	New England Revolution	32	12	8	12	39	35	+4	48	MLS Cup Playoffs
3	Chicago Fire	32	13	11	8	43	41	+2	47	MLS Cup Playoffs
4	New York Red Bulls	32	9	11	12	41	41	0	39	MLS Cup Playoffs
5	Kansas City Wizards	32	10	14	8	43	45	−2	38	
6	Columbus Crew	32	8	15	9	30	42	−12	33	

Source: MLS

===== Overall =====
Pos	Team	Pld	W	L	T	GF	GA	GD	Pts	Qualification
1	D.C. United (S)	32	15	7	10	52	38	+14	55	CONCACAF Champions' Cup
2	FC Dallas	32	16	12	4	48	44	+4	52	North American SuperLiga
3	New England Revolution	32	12	8	12	39	35	+4	48	
4	Chicago Fire	32	13	11	8	43	41	+2	47	
5	Houston Dynamo (C)	32	11	8	13	44	40	+4	46	CONCACAF Champions' Cup
6	Chivas USA	32	10	9	13	45	42	+3	43	
7	Colorado Rapids	32	11	13	8	36	49	−13	41	
8	New York Red Bulls	32	9	11	12	41	41	0	39	
9	Los Angeles Galaxy	32	11	15	6	37	37	0	39	North American SuperLiga
10	Real Salt Lake	32	10	13	9	45	49	−4	39	
11	Kansas City Wizards	32	10	14	8	43	45	−2	38	
12	Columbus Crew	32	8	15	9	30	42	−12	33	

Source: MLS
Rules for classification: 1) points; 2) head-to-head record; 3) goal difference; 4) number of goals scored
(C) Champions; (S) Supporters' Shield

==== Game reports ====
April 2, 2006 1	D.C. United	2–2	New York Red Bulls	Washington, D.C.
17:00 UTC−5	Gros (yellow card) 5'; Eskandarian 55'; Erpen 65'	Report	Djorkaeff 6'; Buddle 17'; Parke (yellow card) 34'; Guevara (yellow card) 34'; O'Rourke (yellow card) 81'	Stadium: RFK Stadium; Attendance: 23,028; Referee: Brian Hall

April 8, 2006 2	D.C. United	2–0	Chivas USA	Washington, D.C.
16:00 UTC−5	Moreno 59', 91+'	Report		Stadium: RFK Stadium; Attendance: 23,028

April 15, 2006 3	D.C. United	2–0	Houston Dynamo	Washington, D.C.
19:30 UTC−5	Gros 25'; Gomez 71'	Report		Stadium: RFK Stadium

April 22, 2006 4	New York Red Bulls	1–4	D.C. United	East Rutherford, New Jersey
16:00 UTC−5		Report		Stadium: Giants Stadium

April 29, 2006 5	D.C. United	1–1	FC Dallas	Washington, D.C.
19:30 UTC−5	Olsen 17'	Report	O'Brien 41'	Stadium: RFK Stadium

May 6, 2006 6	Colorado Rapids	2–1	D.C. United	Denver, Colorado
21:00 UTC−5		Report		Stadium: Invesco Field at Mile High

May 13, 2006 7	D.C. United	2–1	Kansas City Wizards	Washington, D.C.
UTC−5				Stadium: RFK Stadium; Attendance: 18,345

May 20, 2006 8	Columbus Crew	1–1	D.C. United	Columbus, Ohio
UTC−5				Stadium: Crew Stadium; Attendance: 12,646

May 27, 2006 9	Kansas City Wizards	1–3	D.C. United	Kansas City, Missouri
UTC−5				Stadium: Arrowhead Stadium; Attendance: 10,945

May 31, 2006 10	D.C. United	5–1	Columbus Crew	Washington, D.C.
UTC−5				Stadium: RFK Stadium; Attendance: 11,725

June 3, 2006 11	D.C. United	1–0	New England Revolution	Washington, D.C.
UTC−5				Stadium: RFK Stadium; Attendance: 22,686

June 11, 2006 12	LA Galaxy	1–1	D.C. United	Carson, California
UTC−5				Stadium: Home Depot Center; Attendance: 17,538

June 17, 2006 13	New England Revolution	1–1	D.C. United	Foxborough, Massachusetts
UTC−5				Stadium: Gillette Stadium; Attendance: 16,209

June 21, 2006 14	D.C. United	1–0	Chicago Fire	Washington, D.C.
UTC−5				Stadium: RFK Stadium; Attendance: 12,385

June 24, 2006 15	D.C. United	1–0	Kansas City Wizards	Washington, D.C.
UTC−5				Stadium: RFK Stadium; Attendance: 13,834

June 28, 2006 16	Kansas City Wizards	2–3	D.C. United	Kansas City, Missouri
UTC−5				Stadium: Arrowhead Stadium; Attendance: 8,710

July 4, 2006 17	FC Dallas	0–1	D.C. United	Frisco, Texas
UTC−5				Stadium: Pizza Hut Park; Attendance: 16,240

July 8, 2006 18	Columbus Crew	0–1	D.C. United	Columbus, Ohio
UTC−5				Stadium: Crew Stadium; Attendance: 14,134

July 15, 2006 19	D.C. United	3–2	Columbus Crew	Washington, D.C.
UTC−5	Gómez 16'; Olsen (yellow card) 26' (goal) 64'; Carroll 49'	Report	Kamara (yellow card) 35' (goal) 45+1'; Vasquez 72'	Stadium: RFK Stadium; Attendance: 20,227; Referee: Michael Kennedy

July 22, 2006 20	Chicago Fire	1–1	D.C. United	Bridgeview, Illinois
20:00 UTC−5	Robinson (yellow card) 18'; Pause (yellow card) 19' (yellow-red card) 51'; Jaqua 29'; Segares (yellow card) 73'; Armas (yellow card) 74'	Report	Olsen (yellow card) 45+1'; Boswell (yellow card) 45+2'; Carroll (yellow card) 53'; Gómez (yellow card) 61'; Eskandarian 74'; Namoff (yellow card) 76'	Stadium: Toyota Park; Attendance: 15,094; Referee: Kevin Stott

July 29, 2006 21	Real Salt Lake	2–1	D.C. United	Salt Lake City, Utah
21:00 UTC−5	Besagno (yellow card) 15'; Talley (yellow card) 32'; Cunningham 90' (pen.), 90+6' (pen.); Watson (yellow card) 90+5'	Report	Moreno 10'; Wilson (yellow card) 90+5'	Stadium: Rice-Eccles Stadium; Attendance: 20,027; Referee: Abbey Okulaja

August 16, 2006 22	New York Red Bulls	0–0	D.C. United	East Rutherford, New Jersey
UTC−5	Mendes (yellow card) 6'; Magee (yellow card) 30'; Guevara (yellow card) 63'; Meola (yellow card) 81'	Report	Erpen (yellow card) 36'; Namoff (yellow card) 80'; Dyachenko (yellow card) 90'	Stadium: Giants Stadium; Attendance: 11,230; Referee: Mauricio Navarro

August 19, 2006 23	D.C. United	1–1	Colorado Rapids	Washington, D.C.
UTC−5	Carroll (yellow card) 6'; Gómez 56'; Eskandarian (yellow card) 84'	Report	Beckerman 32'; Martins (yellow card) 61'; Petke (yellow card) 90'	Stadium: RFK Stadium; Attendance: 18,006; Referee: Jair Marrufo

August 26, 2006 24	D.C. United	2–5	LA Galaxy	Washington, D.C.
UTC−5	Albright 9' (o.g.); Erpen 69'; Gros (yellow card) 74'; Gómez (yellow card) 85'; Boswell (yellow card) 87'	Report	Gordon 4'; Ihemelu (yellow card) 16'; Albright 47'; Nagamura (yellow card) 51'; Donovan 66' (pen.), 90+2' (yellow card) 88'; Namoff 71' (o.g.)	Stadium: RFK Stadium; Attendance: 24,159; Referee: Mark Geiger

September 3, 2006 25	Chivas USA	1–2	D.C. United	Carson, California
UTC−5	Suárez 32' (pen.); Hernandez (yellow card) 90+2'; Panchito (yellow card) 90+3'; Palencia (red card) 90+3'	Report	Gómez 3', 33' (yellow card) 30'; Boswell (yellow card) 18'; Eskandarian (yellow card) 23'; Carroll (yellow card) 75'; Gros (red card) 90+4'	Stadium: The Home Depot Center; Attendance: 14,588; Referee: Kevin Stott

September 9, 2006 26	D.C. United	1–1	Real Salt Lake	Washington, D.C.
UTC−5	Adu 45'; Prideaux (yellow card) 61'; Dyachenko (yellow card) 64'; Olsen (yellow card) 65'	Report	Cunningham (yellow card) 62'; Klein 65'	Stadium: RFK Stadium; Attendance: 19,812; Referee: Baldomero Toledo

September 13, 2006 27	New England Revolution	1–1	D.C. United	Foxborough, Massachusetts
UTC−5	Dempsey 56'	Report	Gros 25'	Stadium: Gillette Stadium; Attendance: 6,285; Referee: Jorge Gonzalez

September 17, 2006 28	Chicago Fire	1–0	D.C. United	Chicago, Illinois
UTC−5		Report		Stadium: Soldier Field; Attendance: 16,713

September 23, 2006 29	D.C. United	4–3	New York Red Bulls	Washington, D.C.
UTC−5				Stadium: RFK Memorial Stadium; Attendance: 21,727

30	v
UTC−5

31	v
UTC−5

32	v
UTC−5

=== MLS Cup Playoffs ===
Round	Leg	Date	Opponents	Venue	Result	Score F–A	Goalscorers	Attendance	Ref
Conf. SF	1	October 21, 2006	New York Red Bulls	A	W	1–0	Gómez	8,630	
Conf. SF	2	October 29, 2006	New York Red Bulls	H	T	1–1	Gómez	21,455	
Conf. F	^{[A]}	November 5, 2006	New England Revolution	H	L	0–1		19,552	

=== U.S. Open Cup ===
August 1, 2006 4th Rd	D.C. United (Washington, D.C.)	2–1 (a.e.t.)	(Ohio) Columbus Crew	Germantown, Maryland
19:30 UTC−5	Moreno 22'; Boswell (yellow card) 75'; Walker 93'	Report	González (yellow card) 15'; Marshall 18'; Moss (yellow card) 30'	Stadium: Maryland SoccerPlex; Attendance: 4,774; Referee: Terry Vaughn

August 23, 2006 QF	D.C. United (Washington, D.C.)	3–1	(New York City) New York Red Bulls	Washington, D.C.
19:30 UTC−5	Gros 37'; Walker 61', 84'	Report	Guevara 41'; Jolley (yellow card) 87'	Stadium: RFK Stadium; Attendance: 8,637; Referee: Alex Prus

September 6, 2006 SF	Chicago Fire	3–0	(Washington, D.C.) D.C. United	Bridgeview, Illinois
20:30 UTC−5	Mapp 58'; Carr 76', 91+'; Armas (red card) 77'	Report	Simms (yellow card) 68'; Erpen (yellow card) 76'; Olsen (yellow card) 85'	Stadium: Toyota Park; Attendance: 5,153; Referee: Richard Heron

== Statistics ==
=== Appearances and goals ===
No.	Pos	Nat	Player	Total		Major League Soccer		U.S. Open Cup		MLS Cup	
No.	Pos	Nat	Player	Apps	Goals	Apps	Goals	Apps	Goals	Apps	Goals
1	GK	(United States) USA	Troy Perkins	34	0	30+0	0	1+0	0	3+0	0
2	DF	(United States) USA	David Stokes	5	0	1+2	0	0+1	0	0+1	0
4	DF	(United States) USA	Brandon Prideaux	12	0	9+0	0	1+0	0	0+2	0
5	DF	(Argentina) ARG	Facundo Erpen	35	3	30+0	3	3+0	0	2+0	0
6	MF	(United States) USA	Domenic Mediate	9	0	2+6	0	1+0	0	0+0	0
7	MF	(Argentina) ARG	Matías Donnet	9	1	7+1	1	0+1	0	0+0	0
7	MF	(Argentina) ARG	Lucio Filomeno	12	1	5+6	1	0+0	0	0+1	0
8	MF	(United States) USA	Justin Moose	1	3	0+1	3	0+0	0	0+0	0
9	MF	(United States) USA	Freddy Adu	37	2	29+3	2	2+0	0	3+0	0
10	MF	(Argentina) ARG	Christian Gómez	35	16	28+2	14	2+0	0	3+0	2
11	FW	(United States) USA	Alecko Eskandarian	26	7	16+6	7	1+0	0	3+0	0
12	DF	(United States) USA	John Wilson	11	0	2+9	0	0+0	0	0+0	0
14	MF	(United States) USA	Ben Olsen	26	2	18+2	2	1+2	0	3+0	0
15	MF	(Russia) RUS	Rod Dyachenko	13	0	4+5	0	1+2	0	0+1	0
16	MF	(United States) USA	Brian Carroll	37	0	31+0	0	3+0	0	3+0	0
17	DF	(United States) USA	Joshua Gros	35	4	29+0	3	3+0	1	2+1	0
18	GK	(United States) USA	Nick Rimando	4	0	2+0	0	2+0	0	0+0	0
19	MF	(United States) USA	Clyde Simms	30	1	10+14	1	2+1	0	1+2	0
20	DF	(United States) USA	Matt Nickell	5	0	0+3	0	0+2	0	0+0	0
21	MF	(Jamaica) JAM	Stephen deRoux	5	0	2+2	0	0+1	0	0+0	0
22	MF	(United States) USA	Devon McTavish	8	0	3+5	0	0+0	0	0+0	0
23	FW	(United States) USA	Jamil Walker	23	4	3+16	1	2+1	3	0+1	0
24	MF	(United States) USA	Jeff Carroll	5	0	1+1	0	0+0	0	1+2	0
25	FW	(United States) USA	Santino Quaranta	4	0	4+0	0	0+0	0	0+0	0
26	DF	(United States) USA	Bryan Namoff	32	0	25+1	0	3+0	0	3+0	0
31	FW	(Uganda) UGA	Robert Ssejjemba	1	0	0+1	0	0+0	0	0+0	0
32	DF	(United States) USA	Bobby Boswell	36	1	30+0	1	3+0	0	3+0	0
99	FW	(Bolivia) BOL	Jaime Moreno	37	12	31+1	11	1+1	1	3+0	0

=== Top scorers ===
Rank	Nation	Number	Name	Total	MLS	Open Cup	MLS Cup
1	(Argentina)	10	Christian Gómez	16	14	0	2
2	(Bolivia)	99	Jaime Moreno	12	11	1	0
3	(United States)	11	Alecko Eskandarian	7	4	0	0
4	(United States)	4	Joshua Gros	4	3	1	0
4	(United States)	17	Jamil Walker	4	1	3	0
6	(Argentina)	5	Facundo Erpen	3	3	0	0
7	(United States)	9	Freddy Adu	2	2	0	0
7	(United States)	14	Ben Olsen	2	2	0	0

Updated to match played November 8, 2011
Source: D.C. United

== Transfers ==
=== In ===
Sourced list of players signed during the season

=== Out ===
Sourced list of players sold or loaned out during the season

== See also ==
- 2006 in American soccer
- 2006 Major League Soccer
- List of D.C. United seasons
