= 2003 D.C. United season =

D.C. United
2003 season
- Owner: D.C. United Holdings
- Head coach: Ray Hudson
- MLS: 7th
- MLS Cup: Conference Semifinals
- U.S. Open Cup: Semifinals
- Atlantic Cup: Runners-up
- Top goalscorer: League: All: Kovalenko; Etcheverry (06)
Home colors	Away colors	Third colors

The 2003 D.C. United season was the clubs' ninth year of existence, as well as their seventh season in Major League Soccer.

Led by Ray Hudson, D.C. United's 2003 campaign was highlighted by the club's return to the MLS Cup Playoffs, their first postseason appearance since 1999. In the playoffs, United who didn't qualify for the playoffs until the final day of the regular season, took on the Eastern Conference regular season champions, Chicago Fire. The Fire defeated United 4–0 on aggregates in the conference semifinals, winning each leg by a 2–0 margin of victory.

== Background ==
Squad No.	Name	Nationality	Position(s)	Date of birth (age)	Apps	Goals	Assists	Signed from
Goalkeepers
1	Doug Warren	(United States)	GK	March 18, 1981 (age 44)				(United States)
18	Nick Rimando	(United States)	GK	June 17, 1979 (age 46)				(United States)
28	Clint Baumstark	(United States)	GK	January 9, 1983 (age 43)				(United States)
Wingers
8	Hristo Stoichkov	(Bulgaria)		February 8, 1966 (age 60)				(United States)
Strikers
11	Alecko Eskandarian	(United States)		July 9, 1978 (age 47)				
17	Ali Curtis	(United States)		December 18, 1978 (age 47)				(United States)
19	Devin Barclay	(United States)		April 9, 1983 (age 42)				(United States)
27	Ronald Cerritos	(Honduras)		January 3, 1975 (age 51)				
29	Thiago Martins	(Brazil)		September 4, 1976 (age 49)				

== Review ==
=== November ===
On November 1, 2003, D.C. United played their first playoff match in nearly four years, entering the 2003 MLS Cup Playoffs as the fourth seed in the Eastern Conference. In the Conference semifinals, United faced the Eastern Conference regular season champions, Chicago Fire. The two-match, aggregate series was first contested at United's RFK Stadium. The match ended in a 2–0 defeat thanks to goals from the Fire's Andy Williams and Ante Razov in the 4th and 94th minutes, respectively.

A week later, on November 9, 2003, the second leg was played at Chicago Fire's Soldier Field, where the Fire defeated United by the same 2–0 scoreline, thus ultimately winning the series 4–0 on aggregate, and advancing to the Eastern Conference championship. The defeat ended United's playoff campaign and their season altogether.

== Non-competitive ==
=== Preseason exhibitions ===
February 14, 2003	D.C. United	2–1	Canada U20	Boca Raton, Florida
	Stoitchkov 18' (pen.), 35' (pen.); Kovalenko (yellow card) 21' (yellow-red card) 50'	Report	Hume 47'	Stadium: Bobby Campbell Stadium

February 16, 2003	Lynn Fighting Knights	0–3	D.C. United	Boca Raton, Florida
2:30 p.m.		Report	Gomez 35'; Mediros 61', 83'	Stadium: Bobby Campbell Stadium

February 18, 2003	FIU Panthers	0–3	D.C. United	Miami, Florida
		Report	Petke 14'; Kovalenko 26'; Stoitchkov 49'	Stadium: FIU Soccer Stadium; Attendance: 817

February 20, 2003	Florida Atlantic Owls	3–5	D.C. United	Boca Raton, Florida
	Totland 26'; Garbee 75'; Baum 86'	Report	Ivanov 32'; Etcheverry 44'; Eskandarian 54'; Olsen 57'; Quintanilla 90+1'	Stadium: FAU Soccer Stadium

=== Midseason exhibitions ===
May 14, 2003	D.C. United	1–0	Tottenham Hotspur	Washington, D.C.
7:30 p.m.	Carr 30' (o.g.); Stoitchkov (yellow card) 67'	Report		Stadium: RFK Stadium; Attendance: 14,028; Referee: Kevin Terry

July 23, 2003	D.C. United	1–1 (a.e.t.) (6–5 p)	Blackburn Rovers	Washington, D.C.
7:00 p.m.	Carroll 85'	Report	Taylor (yellow card) 16'; Cole 30'; Neill (yellow card) 90+2'	Stadium: RFK Stadium; Attendance: 9,452; Referee: Ali Saheli
	Penalties
	Carroll (penalty scored); Etcheverry (penalty scored); Curtis (penalty scored); Quintanilla (penalty scored); Olsen (penalty scored); Prideaux (penalty missed); Kovalenko (penalty scored)		(penalty scored) Saunders; (penalty scored) Ostenstad; (penalty scored) Danns; (penalty scored) Taylor; (penalty scored) Gallagher; (penalty missed) Todd; (penalty missed) Johansson

August 31, 2003	D.C. United	3–1	El Salvador	Washington, D.C.
7:30 p.m.	Stewart 24', 50'; Etcheverry 39'; Olsen (yellow card) 62'; Geddes (yellow card) 85'	Report	Pacheco 6'; Velásquez (yellow card) 20'; Meraz 73'	Stadium: RFK Stadium; Attendance: 23,269; Referee: Michael Kennedy

== Competitive ==
=== Major League Soccer ===
==== Standings ====
Eastern Conference

Pos	Team	Pld	W	L	T	GF	GA	GD	Pts	Qualification
1	Chicago Fire	30	15	7	8	53	43	+10	53	MLS Cup Playoffs
2	New England Revolution	30	12	9	9	55	47	+8	45	MLS Cup Playoffs
3	MetroStars	30	11	10	9	40	40	0	42	MLS Cup Playoffs
4	D.C. United	30	10	11	9	38	36	+2	39	MLS Cup Playoffs
5	Columbus Crew	30	10	12	8	44	44	0	38	

Source: MLS

Overall table

Pos	Team	Pld	W	L	T	GF	GA	GD	Pts	Qualification
1	Chicago Fire (S)	30	15	7	8	53	43	+10	53	CONCACAF Champions' Cup
2	San Jose Earthquakes (C)	30	14	7	9	45	35	+10	51	CONCACAF Champions' Cup
3	New England Revolution	30	12	9	9	55	47	+8	45	
4	Kansas City Wizards	30	11	10	9	48	44	+4	42	
5	MetroStars	30	11	10	9	40	40	0	42	
6	Colorado Rapids	30	11	12	7	40	45	−5	40	
7	D.C. United	30	10	11	9	38	36	+2	39	
8	Columbus Crew	30	10	12	8	44	44	0	38	
9	Los Angeles Galaxy	30	9	12	9	35	35	0	36	
10	Dallas Burn	30	6	19	5	35	64	−29	23	

Source: MLS
Rules for classification: 1) points; 2) head-to-head record; 3) goal difference; 4) number of goals scored
(C) Champions; (S) Supporters' Shield

==== Match results ====
April 12, 2003 1	Kansas City Wizards	3–2 (a.e.t.)	D.C. United	Kansas City, Missouri
16:00 ET	Preki 3'; Klein 61'; Brown 92'	Report	Petke 36'; Quaranta 46'	Stadium: Arrowhead Stadium

April 19, 2003 2	D.C. United	0–0 (a.e.t.)	Chicago Fire	Washington, D.C.
15:30 ET		Report		Stadium: RFK Stadium

April 26, 2003 3	Colorado Rapids	1–1 (a.e.t.)	D.C. United	Denver, Colorado
17:00 ET	Spencer 24' (pen.)	Report	Etcheverry 7'	Stadium: Invesco Field

May 3, 2003 4	D.C. United	0–0 (a.e.t.)	Dallas Burn	Washington, D.C.
15:30 ET		Report		Stadium: RFK Stadium

May 10, 2003 5	MetroStars	1–0	D.C. United	East Rutherford, New Jersey
15:30 ET	Mathis	Report		Stadium: Giants Stadium

May 17, 2003 6	D.C. United	1–1	Kansas City Wizards	Washington, D.C.
15:30 ET		Report		Stadium: RFK Stadium

May 31, 2003 7	Dallas Burn	3–2	D.C. United	Southlake, Texas
15:30 ET		Report		Stadium: Dragon Stadium

June 7, 2003 8	D.C. United	2–0	Chicago Fire	Washington, D.C.
15:30 ET				Stadium: RFK Stadium

June 11, 2003 9	Colorado Rapids	0–0 (a.e.t.)	D.C. United	Denver, Colorado
17:30 ET				Stadium: Invesco Field

June 14, 2003 10	D.C. United	3–0	Columbus Crew	Washington, D.C.
15:30 ET				Stadium: RFK Stadium

June 21, 2003 11	D.C. United	1–1	New England Revolution	Washington, D.C.
15:30 ET				Stadium: RFK Stadium

June 28, 2003 12	Columbus Crew	3–0	D.C. United	Columbus, Ohio
15:30 ET				Stadium: Crew Stadium

July 2, 2003 13	Dallas Burn	1–3	D.C. United	Southlake, Texas
17:00 ET				Stadium: Dragon Stadium

July 5, 2003 14	D.C. United	2–3	MetroStars	Washington, D.C.
12:00 ET				Stadium: RFK Stadium

15	v
UTC−5

16	v
UTC−5

17	v
UTC−5

18	v
UTC−5

19	v
UTC−5

20	v
UTC−5

21	v
UTC−5

22	v
UTC−5

23	v
UTC−5

24	v
UTC−5

25	v
UTC−5

26	v
UTC−5

27	v
UTC−5

28	v
UTC−5

29	v
UTC−5

30	v
UTC−5

31	v
UTC−5

32	v
UTC−5

=== MLS Cup Playoffs ===
November 1, 2003 Conf. SF	D.C. United	0–2	Chicago Fire	Washington, D.C. United States
		Report	Williams 4'; Razov 94'	Stadium: RFK Stadium; Attendance: 15,202; Referee: George Gansner

November 9, 2003 Conf. SF	Chicago Fire	2–0 (4–0 agg.)	D.C. United	Chicago United States
		Report		Stadium: Soldier Field; Attendance: 15,312

=== U.S. Open Cup ===
July 16, 2003 Third round	D.C. United (Washington, D.C.)	2–1	(Pennsylvania) Pittsburgh Riverhounds	Germantown, Maryland
	Petke 33'; Kovalenko 44'	Report	Wright (yellow card) 37'; Tripoli (yellow card) 41'; Villar (yellow card) 59'; Martins 74'; Chulis (yellow card) 83'	Stadium: Maryland SoccerPlex; Attendance: 3,073; Referee: Hector Tobon

August 6, 2003 Fourth round	D.C. United (Washington, D.C.)	1–0 (a.e.t.)	Virginia Beach Mariners	Germantown, Maryland
	Petke (yellow card) 13'; Quintanilla (yellow card) 23'; Eskandarian (yellow card) 57'; Stokes (yellow card) 90'; Stoitchkov 97'	Report	Lassiter (yellow card) 12'; Washington (yellow card) 15'; Bilyk (yellow card) 21'	Stadium: Maryland SoccerPlex; Attendance: 2,870; Referee: Abiodun Okulaja

August 27, 2003 Quarterfinals	Wilmington Hammerheads (North Carolina)	0–1	(Washington, D.C.) D.C. United	Wilmington, North Carolina
	Zarate (yellow card) 55'	Report	Cerritos 30'	Stadium: Legion Field; Attendance: 5,016; Referee: Gus St. Silva

October 1, 2003 Semifinals	MetroStars (New Jersey)	3–2	(Washington, D.C.) D.C. United	Piscataway, New Jersey
	Guevara 20', 43'; Wolyniec 88'	Report	Ivanov 18'; Warren (red card) 59'; Cerritos 76'	Stadium: Yurcak Field; Attendance: 3,791; Referee: Terry Vaughn

== Statistics ==
=== Appearances and goals ===
Numbers after plus–sign (+) denote appearances as a substitute.

No.	Pos	Nat	Player	Total		MLS		MLS Cup		US Open Cup	
No.	Pos	Nat	Player	Apps	Goals	Apps	Goals	Apps	Goals	Apps	Goals
1	GK	(United States) USA	Doug Warren	0	0	0+0	0	0	0	0	0
2	DF	(United States) USA	David Stokes	0	0	0+0	0	0	0	0	0
3	DF	(Bulgaria) BUL	Galin Ivanov	0	0	0+0	0	0	0	0	0
4	DF	(United States) USA	Brandon Prideaux	0	0	0+0	0	0	0	0	0
5	DF	(Honduras) HON	Milton Reyes	0	0	0+0	0	0	0	0	0
7	DF	(New Zealand) NZL	Ryan Nelsen	0	0	0+0	0	0	0	0	0
8	FW	(Bulgaria) BUL	Hristo Stoitchkov	0	0	0+0	0	0	0	0	0
9	FW	(United States) USA	Earnie Stewart	0	0	0+0	0	0	0	0	0
10	MF	(Bolivia) BOL	Marco Etcheverry	0	0	0+0	0	0	0	0	0
11	FW	(United States) USA	Alecko Eskandarian	0	0	0+0	0	0	0	0	0
12	DF	(United States) USA	Mike Petke	0	0	0+0	0	0	0	0	0
13	MF	(Peru) PER	Jose Alegria	0	0	0+0	0	0	0	0	0
14	MF	(United States) USA	Ben Olsen	0	0	0+0	0	0	0	0	0
15	MF	(United States) USA	Bobby Convey	0	0	0+0	0	0	0	0	0
16	MF	(United States) USA	Brian Carroll	0	0	0+0	0	0	0	0	0
18	GK	(United States) USA	Nick Rimando	0	0	0+0	0	0	0	0	0
19	FW	(United States) USA	Devin Barclay	0	0	0+0	0	0	0	0	0
20	FW	(El Salvador) SLV	Eliseo Quintanilla	0	0	0+0	0	0	0	0	0
21	MF	(Ukraine) UKR	Dema Kovalenko	0	0	0+0	0	0	0	0	0
24	MF	(United States) USA	Trevor Perea	0	0	0+0	0	0	0	0	0
25	FW	(United States) USA	Santino Quaranta	0	0	0+0	0	0	0	0	0
26	MF	(United States) USA	Bryan Namoff	0	0	0+0	0	0	0	0	0
27	FW	(El Salvador) SLV	Ronald Cerritos	0	0	0+0	0	0	0	0	0
28	GK	(United States) USA	Clint Baumstark	0	0	0+0	0	0	0	0	0
29	FW	(Brazil) BRA	Thiago Martins	0	0	0+0	0	0	0	0	0

- Last updated: November 1, 2003
- Source: Soccerway

== Transfers ==
=== MLS SuperDraft picks ===
D.C. United made a total of seven selections in the 2003 MLS Draft. Five of the draft picks were ultimately signed for the 2003 season.

2003 D.C. United SuperDraft Picks
Round	Selection	Player	Position	College	Status
1	1	(United States) Alecko Eskandarian	FW	Virginia	Signed to first team
1	5	(United States) David Stokes	DF	North Carolina	Signed to first team
2	11	(United States) Brian Carroll	MF	Wake Forest	Signed with first team
2	14	(United States) Doug Warren	GK	Clemson	Signed with first team
4	31	(United States) Hayden Woodworth	MF	Messiah	Did not sign
5	41	(United States) John Swann	DF	Indiana	Did not sign
6	51	(United States) Michael Behonick	GK	American	Signed with first team

== See also ==
- 2003 in American soccer
- 2003 Major League Soccer season
- 2003 U.S. Open Cup
- D.C. United
- List of D.C. United seasons
