= Nick Rimando =

American soccer player (born 1979)

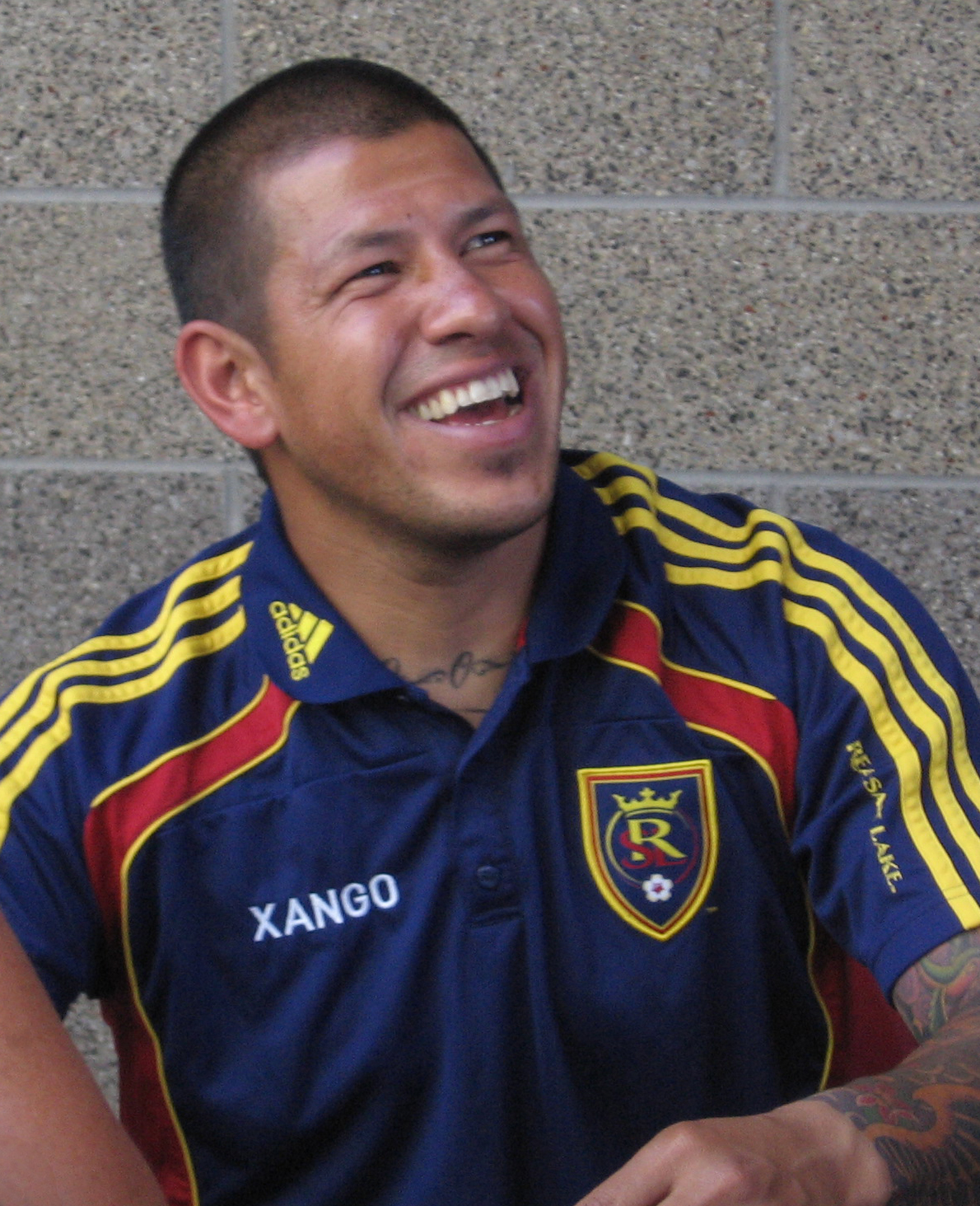
- Rimando with Real Salt Lake in 2010

Personal information
- Full name: Nicholas Paul Rimando
- Date of birth: June 17, 1979 (age 47)
- Place of birth: Montclair, California, United States
- Height: 5 ft 9 in (1.75 m)
- Position: Goalkeeper

College career
Years	Team	Apps	(Gls)
1997–1999	UCLA Bruins	48	(0)

Senior career*
Years	Team	Apps	(Gls)
2000–2001	Miami Fusion	47	(0)
2000	→ MLS Pro-40 (loan)	2	(0)
2002–2006	D.C. United	98	(0)
2007–2019	Real Salt Lake	369	(0)
Total		516	(0)

International career
1998–1999	United States U20	31	(0)
2002–2017	United States	22	(0)
Medal record
Men's Soccer
Representing United States
CONCACAF Gold Cup
Winner	2013 United States
Runner-up	2011 United States
CONCACAF Cup
Runner-up	2015 United States
- * Club domestic league appearances and goals

Nicholas Paul Rimando (born June 17, 1979) is an American former professional soccer player who played as a goalkeeper. Having spent his entire career in Major League Soccer, he holds the records for career wins, clean sheets, saves, and overall appearances. He also played for the United States national team.

== Youth and college ==
Rimando was born in Montclair, California of Mexican and Filipino parentage, and attended Montclair High School. He played two years of college soccer at UCLA. As a freshman in 1997, he tended goal as the Bruins won the College Cup; after his sophomore year, he signed a Project-40 contract with MLS.

== Professional career ==
=== Miami and D.C. ===
Rimando was selected 35th in the third round of the 2000 MLS SuperDraft by the Miami Fusion, and quickly took the starting position from Jeff Cassar, starting 22 games as a rookie. He started 25 games the following season, helping the Fusion to win the 2001 MLS Supporters' Shield.

When the Fusion were contracted after the 2001 season, Rimando was selected third overall by D.C. United (his coach at Miami, Ray Hudson, was the new United boss) in the subsequent Allocation Draft. For DC, Rimando played in every game in 2002 and in 25 games in 2003 until he missed the end of the season with an injury. In 2004, with Hudson gone, he lost his starting job to Troy Perkins, but regained it for the stretch run, backstopping DC to the MLS Cup. In 2005, he regained his everyday starter status, but was beaten out by Perkins again in 2006, playing only two games during the whole season.

=== Real Salt Lake ===
On December 11, 2006, Rimando was traded along with Freddy Adu to Real Salt Lake. He was then traded to New York Red Bulls on February 9, only to be traded back to Real Salt Lake on February 23 following the sudden retirement of the latter team's first-choice keeper Scott Garlick.

Rimando was RSL's first-choice keeper during the 2007 season. His team struggled constantly and never seriously contended for a playoff berth, but Rimando led MLS with 146 saves in 27 games, including efforts against New England (13 saves in a 0–0 draw on June 2) and Toronto FC (12 saves in a 0–0 draw on September 15). His hard work was rewarded at the end of the season when he was named Real Salt Lake's 2007 Most Valuable Player.

Rimando continued as Salt Lake's first-choice keeper in 2008 and 2009. He emerged as one of the top keepers in the league, as evidenced by his MLS Player of the Month award in July 2008. His strong performance between the pipes, combined with his team's much-improved defensive play, carried the team to the Western Conference final in 2008, and one match further in 2009. In the Eastern Conference final against the Chicago Fire, RSL battled to a scoreless draw after 120 minutes. Rimando made several saves in regulation and overtime, then added three saves on penalty kicks, lifting his team to a 5–4 shootout victory. In the MLS Cup championship match, Rimando again found himself facing a shootout, and again he delivered. He made three saves, leading RSL to a victory over the Los Angeles Galaxy. For his efforts, he was named MLS Cup MVP, only the second goalkeeper to earn the honor (Tony Meola previously accomplished the feat in 2000).

In 2010, RSL emerged as possibly the greatest defensive team in the history of Major League Soccer. With Rimando as goalkeeper, Salt Lake set an MLS record for fewest goals allowed in a single season - just 20 in 30 matches. Rimando also set club records for most shutouts in a single season (14) and longest shutout streak (568 minutes). Additionally, the team set a league record for highest goal differential (+25), but they were upset by FC Dallas in the first round of the playoffs and couldn't defend their MLS Cup title from the previous season. Despite his stellar season - one of the greatest ever by a keeper in American professional soccer - Rimando did not receive the MLS Goalkeeper of the Year award. Instead, it was given to Donovan Ricketts of the LA Galaxy, which caused some controversy around the league.

On February 4, 2011, Rimando signed a contract extension with RSL that kept him with the club through the 2013 season.

On March 3, 2013, Rimando became the 2nd MLS goalkeeper to earn 100 shutouts after a 2–0 win over the San Jose Earthquakes.

In December 2013, Real Salt Lake and Rimando traveled to Sporting Park in Kansas City, Kansas to face Sporting Kansas City for the MLS Championship Game. Rimando played well despite 10 degree temperatures. He made four major saves in the game. His third save was perhaps the best. Graham Zusi shot a high half volley, but Rimando tipped it over the crossbar. The game went on to penalty kicks after a 1–1 draw. Rimando saved a penalty kick from Matt Besler, but Real Salt Lake lost in sudden death.

On August 9, 2014, playing at home against his former club, D.C. United, Rimando secured the lead in career shutouts for an MLS goalkeeper in a 3–0 win.

On March 1, 2019, Rimando announced he would be retiring following the 2019 season. He played his final match on October 23, 2019, in an MLS Cup playoff match against Seattle Sounders FC at CenturyLink Field in Seattle. Rimando played with an injured left shoulder and made seven saves as Real Salt Lake lost 2–0 and were eliminated from the playoffs. He finished his MLS career with the league record in appearances (515), wins (223), saves (1,712), and shutouts (154).

== International career ==
Although mostly a backup to Tim Howard, Rimando played for the United States at the 1999 World Youth Championship in Nigeria. He earned his first senior team cap on November 17, 2002, against El Salvador. After that, he did not receive much attention from the national team until his outstanding play in MLS in 2009 caught the attention of U.S. coach Bob Bradley. Rimando was invited to train with the senior team in 2010 in preparation for the World Cup, although he was not selected for the tournament. He has made some international appearances since then, including a standout performance in a friendly against Panama on January 25, 2012. He was consistently the third-choice keeper under former manager Jurgen Klinsmann, and was the first-choice keeper at the 2013 CONCACAF Gold Cup.

On May 22, 2014, Rimando was named to the final 23-man roster for the 2014 FIFA World Cup in Brazil. The tournament was his first-ever World Cup finals roster, though he did not log any minutes in any of the USMNT's matches.

== Personal life ==
Rimando's father is of Filipino descent and his mother is of Mexican descent. In December 2005, Rimando married his longtime girlfriend, Jacqui Little. She played for the Washington Freedom in the now-defunct WUSA and is also from California. The wedding was performed by teammate Ben Olsen in Malibu, California. Rimando and Little have two children, Jett Nicholas Rimando and Benny Rose Rimando. They have since divorced.

== Career statistics ==
=== Club ===
Appearances and goals by club, season and competition
Club	Season	MLS		MLS Cup playoffs		U.S. Open Cup		CONCACAF		Total	
Club	Season	Apps	Goals	Apps	Goals	Apps	Goals	Apps	Goals	Apps	Goals
Miami Fusion	2000	22	0	0	0	3	0	0	0	25	0
Miami Fusion	2001	25	0	6	0	0	0	0	0	31	0
Miami Fusion	Total	47	0	6	0	3	0	0	0	56	0
D.C. United	2002	28	0	0	0	0	0	2	0	30	0
D.C. United	2003	25	0	0	0	0	0	0	0	25	0
D.C. United	2004	13	0	4	0	1	0	0	0	18	0
D.C. United	2005	30	0	2	0	0	0	6	0	38	0
D.C. United	2006	2	0	0	0	2	0	0	0	4	0
D.C. United	Total	98	0	6	0	3	0	8	0	115	0
Real Salt Lake	2007	27	0	0	0	0	0	0	0	27	0
Real Salt Lake	2008	30	0	3	0	1	0	0	0	33	0
Real Salt Lake	2009	26	0	4	0	0	0	0	0	30	0
Real Salt Lake	2010	27	0	2	0	0	0	5	0	34	0
Real Salt Lake	2011	33	0	3	0	0	0	6	0	42	0
Real Salt Lake	2012	31	0	2	0	0	0	4	0	37	0
Real Salt Lake	2013	27	0	5	0	2	0	0	0	34	0
Real Salt Lake	2014	24	0	2	0	0	0	0	0	26	0
Real Salt Lake	2015	24	0	0	0	1	0	2	0	27	0
Real Salt Lake	2016	30	0	1	0	0	0	2	0	33	0
Real Salt Lake	2017	28	0	0	0	0	0	0	0	28	0
Real Salt Lake	2018	33	0	3	0	0	0	0	0	36	0
Real Salt Lake	2019	29	0	2	0	1	0	1	0	33	0
Real Salt Lake	Total	369	0	27	0	5	0	20	0	421	0
Career total		514	0	39	0	11	0	28	0	592	0

=== International ===
Appearances and goals by national team and year
National team	Year	Apps	Goals
United States	2002	1	0
United States	2003	2	0
United States	2010	1	0
United States	2011	1	0
United States	2012	1	0
United States	2013	6	0
United States	2014	4	0
United States	2015	5	0
United States	2017	1	0
Total		22	0

== Honors ==
Miami Fusion

- Supporters' Shield: 2001

D.C. United

- MLS Cup: 2004
- Supporters' Shield: 2006

Real Salt Lake

- MLS Cup: 2009

United States

- CONCACAF Gold Cup: 2013

Individual

- National Soccer Hall of Fame: 2025
- MLS All-Star: 2010, 2011, 2013, 2014, 2015, 2019
- MLS Save of the Year: 2012, 2013, 2019
- MLS Cup MVP: 2009
