= Ryan Nelsen =

New Zealand footballer (born 1977)

Ryan Nelsen ONZM
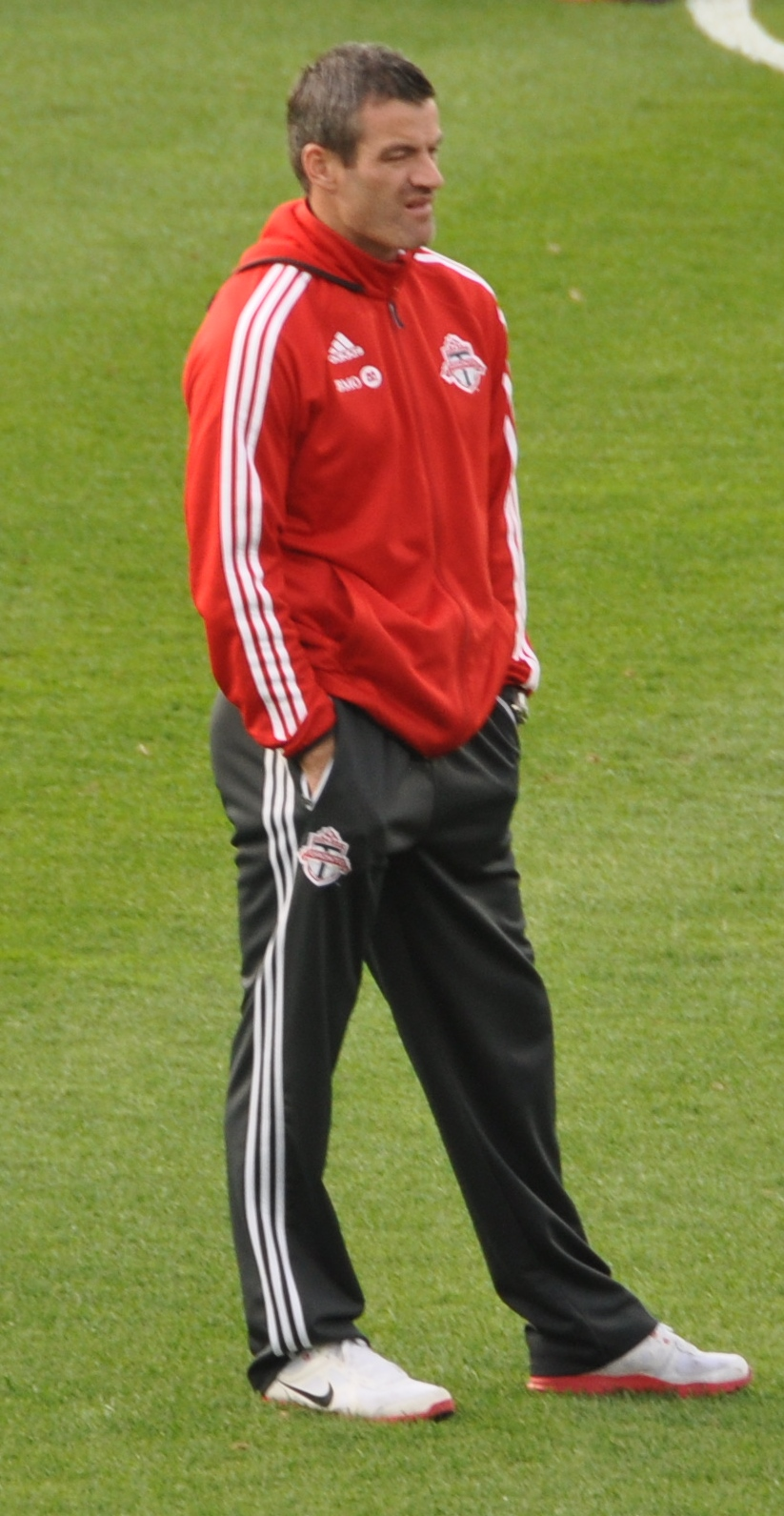
- Nelsen as head coach of Toronto FC in 2013

Personal information
- Full name: Ryan William Nelsen
- Date of birth: 18 October 1977 (age 49)
- Place of birth: Christchurch, New Zealand
- Height: 1.86 m (6 ft 1 in)
- Position: Defender

College career
| Years | Team | Apps | (Gls) |
| 1997–1998 | Greensboro Pride | | |
| 1999–2000 | Stanford Cardinal | | |

Senior career*
| Years | Team | Apps | (Gls) |
| 1995–1998 | Christchurch United | 96 | (12) |
| 2001–2005 | D.C. United | 81 | (7) |
| 2005–2012 | Blackburn Rovers | 172 | (8) |
| 2012 | Tottenham Hotspur | 5 | (0) |
| 2012–2013 | Queens Park Rangers | 21 | (1) |
| Total | | 375 | (28) |

International career
| 2008–2012 | New Zealand Olympic (O.P.) | 8 | (0) |
| 1999–2012 | New Zealand | 49 | (7) |

Managerial career
- 2013–2014: Toronto FC
- * Club domestic league appearances and goals

Ryan William Nelsen ONZM (born 18 October 1977) is a New Zealand former professional football player and head coach.

Nelsen commonly played as a defender, and his professional career began in 1995. He notably captained the New Zealand national team and started his professional football career in his native country for Christchurch United. In 2001, he joined Major League Soccer side D.C. United. In 2005, he moved to England with Premier League side Blackburn Rovers.

In 2012, he made a move to Tottenham Hotspur but only managed 5 appearances before joining Queens Park Rangers later that year. From January 2013 to August 2014 he was head coach of Toronto FC in MLS.

== Early life ==
Growing up in New Zealand, Nelsen played cricket and was "widely regarded as one of the most promising cricketers", but he opted to become a footballer instead.

After attending Our Lady of the Assumption primary school and St Thomas of Canterbury College, Nelsen moved to the United States to play for Greensboro College in North Carolina in 1997. After spending two years at Greensboro and leading The Pride to the National Collegiate Athletic Association (NCAA) Division III championship match, only to lose to Ohio Wesleyan University, he transferred to Stanford University where he played his final two years of college football. He was named Stanford's Most Valuable Player as a junior and an NSCAA All-American as a senior while playing as a defensive midfielder. He graduated with a bachelor's degree in political science.

== Club career ==
=== Christchurch United ===
Nelsen played for Christchurch United from 1995 to 1998. Even after he relocated to the United States, he played his last season with the club when he was home for a semester's sabbatical from his university football scholarship with Greensboro College.

=== DC United ===
Nelsen was drafted fourth overall in the 2001 MLS SuperDraft by D.C. United, with whom he spent four years in Major League Soccer (MLS). After emerging as a starter in 2002, Nelsen was named team captain in 2003, replacing Marco Etcheverry, as well as winning the team's Defender of the Year Award and being named to the league's Best XI. Again, in 2004 after leading United to its fourth MLS Cup, he was named the Best XI. In four years in MLS, Nelsen had seven goals and five assists.

=== Blackburn Rovers ===
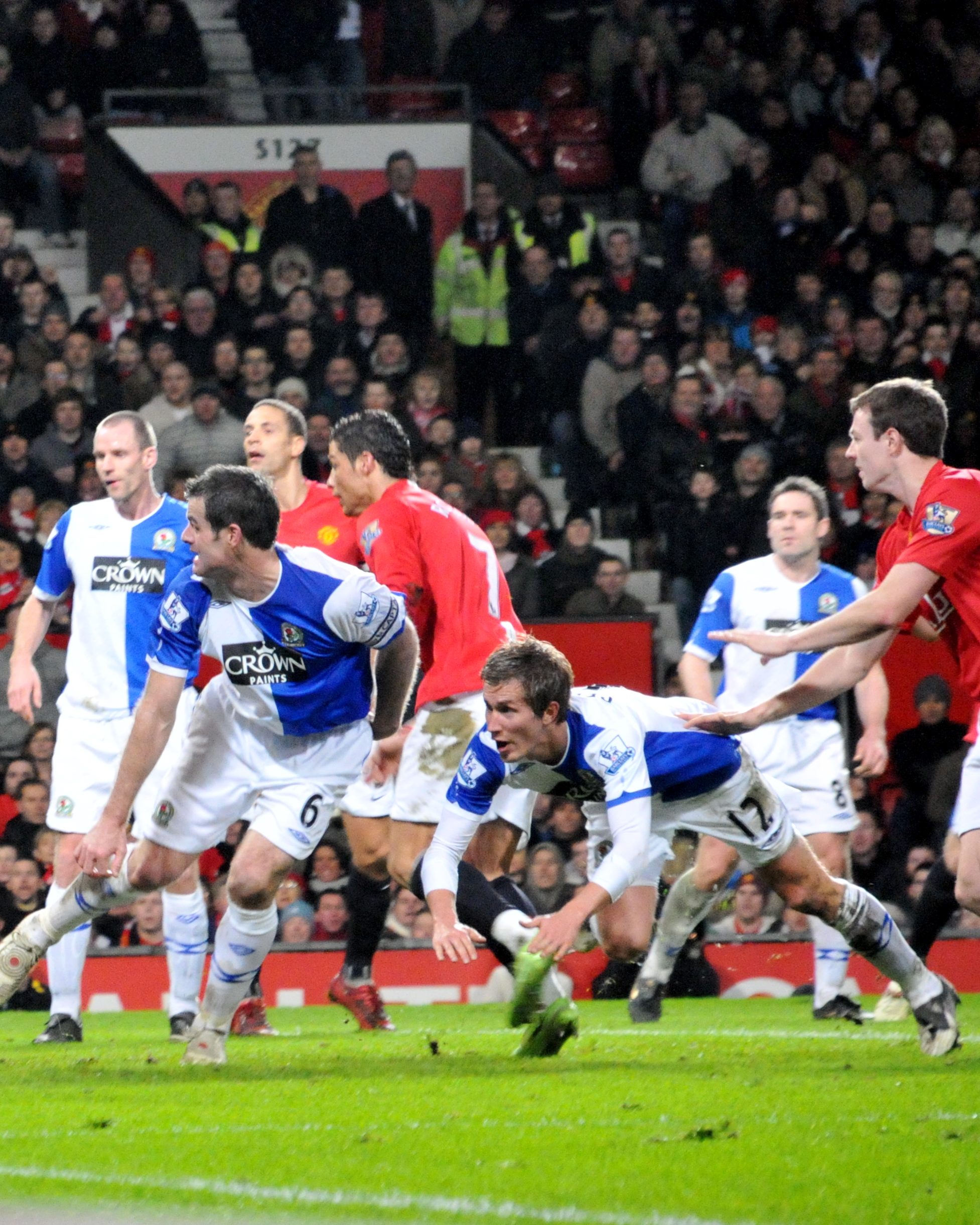
Nelsen and Morten Gamst Pedersen attempt to clear the ball in a match against Manchester United.

Shortly after the completion of the 2004 MLS season, Nelsen was linked with a move to Blackburn Rovers after he was scouted by Mark Hughes and went on trial with the club. After impressing Blackburn Rovers at the trial, the club was keen on signing Nelsen. However, Blackburn Rovers' attempt to sign him suffered a setback at first after the initial application had been refused due to New Zealand being ranked outside the top seventy in the FIFA World Rankings. The setback was eventually resolved and he signed for Blackburn Rovers on a free transfer on 6 January 2005.

Nelsen made his debut for the club, starting the whole game and kept a clean sheet, in a 1–0 win against Portsmouth on 15 January 2005. After the match, manager Hughes praised his debut performance, calling him "the bargain of the season". Since joining Blackburn Rovers, he formed a centre–back partnership with Andy Todd. Nelsen helped the club kept three consecutive clean sheets in the league between 12 February 2005 and 16 March 2005. In absence of Todd, he captained Blackburn Rovers for the first time, in a 2–1 win against Burnley in the fifth round replay of the FA Cup. After the match, Nelsen it was an honour to captain the club, having been told about it just 10 minutes before the match. He helped Blackburn Rovers reach the semi–finals of the FA Cup by beating Leicester City on 13 March 2005. Nelsen, once again, helped the club kept four consecutive clean sheets in the league between 2 April 2005 and 23 April 2005. His performance led to Blackburn Rovers open talks with him over a new contract, with the player, himself, keen on staying. At the end of the 2004–05 season, Nelsen made twenty appearances in all competitions. In the summer of 2005, after just six months at the club, Nelsen signed a new three-year contract after impressing manager Mark Hughes and helping to turn Blackburn's defence into one of the toughest in the Premiership. He also, once again, successfully awarded a work permit on appeal after the initial application had been refused due to New Zealand being ranked outside the top seventy in the FIFA World Rankings.

In the 2005–06 season, Blackburn qualified for the UEFA Cup with a sixth-place finish, but Nelsen missed the last few games after breaking his foot in a 2–0 win at Charlton Athletic. Nevertheless, his performances since arriving in England prompted much interest from rival clubs including Portsmouth, whose bid for Nelsen was rejected by Blackburn. On 1 February 2006, he started and played the full ninety minutes alongside Andy Todd in a 4–3 league victory over Manchester United at Ewood Park.

Nelsen was dealt with another blow before the start of the 2006–07 season, with a serious hamstring injury forcing him out until the new year. On his return to the team in an FA Cup fourth round win against Luton Town, he was immediately made captain. In July 2007, he signed a new five-year deal with the club until the summer of 2012. He scored his first league goal for Blackburn with a header against Wigan Athletic on 26 April 2009 in a 2–0 win which helped Blackburn stay in the Premier League for another season. He then scored his second Premier League goal against Portsmouth with a header from a corner taken by David Dunn on 7 November 2009, and has also scored goals against Birmingham City and Fulham. On 11 April 2010, Nelsen came on for the injured Christopher Samba against Manchester United at Ewood Park in a 0–0 draw. Nelsen made his 175th appearance for Blackburn Rovers, leading the team in a 3–2 defeat to Everton at Ewood Park on 17 April 2010. In all competitions, Nelsen made a total of thirty-three appearances and scored four goals in the 2009–10 season.

On 13 November 2010, he scored against Tottenham Hotspur at White Hart Lane for his first goal of the 2010–11 Premier League season. On 27 November, he played the full ninety minutes partnering Christopher Samba, but this time in a 7–1 rout against Manchester United at Old Trafford. He then added his second and third goals of the campaign by scoring against Wolverhampton Wanderers on 4 December in a 3–0 win and against West Ham United on 18 December in a 1–1 draw.

With Blackburn's tenth successive Premier League season, and their seventeenth in nineteen seasons, now underway, Nelsen welcomed the club's proposed takeover by Indian owned Venky's Group who has promised up to £100 million for Sam Allardyce to spend on strengthening the squad – with Nelsen feeling that the squad could do with "freshing up." On 15 January 2011, he made his 200th appearance for Blackburn in the away game against Chelsea at Stamford Bridge.

Nelsen signed a two-year contract extension with Rovers in late January 2011 which would keep him at the club until the summer of 2013. Under Steve Kean as manager following the sacking of Sam Allardyce, Nelsen was relieved as team captain of Blackburn in favour of Christopher Samba, Nelsen moving to vice-captain. Nelsen suffered a knee injury forcing him to miss the rest of the 2010–11 season. Following the 2010–11 season, in which Blackburn avoided relegation, Nelsen recovered from the knee injury and made one appearance against Aston Villa in a 3–1 loss.

After fully recovering from his knee injury Nelsen was released from Blackburn on the transfer deadline day 31 January 2012 to sign for Tottenham Hotspur by Tottenham boss Harry Redknapp.

=== Tottenham Hotspur ===
Nelsen was signed by Tottenham Hotspur on a free transfer on 2 February 2012, to replace defender Sébastien Bassong, who joined Wolves on loan. He was given the number 33 shirt. He made his debut for Tottenham on 11 February 2012 in the Premier League match against Newcastle United, when he replaced Ledley King in the seventy-fourth minute.

Nelsen made his first starting debut on 19 February 2012 against Stevenage in their FA Cup tie.

He scored his first goal for Tottenham Hotspur on 27 March 2012 in the seventy-fourth minute of an FA Cup tie against Bolton Wanderers in a replay of a previous game, due to Bolton midfielder Fabrice Muamba having a cardiac arrest in the first tie. Tottenham Hotspur won the match 3–1 that day.

On 25 May 2012, he was released by Tottenham with fellow January signing Louis Saha. He made eight appearances scoring one goal.

=== Queens Park Rangers ===
On 18 June 2012, it was announced that Ryan Nelsen had signed a one-year deal with Queens Park Rangers. He scored the first goal with Rangers against Wigan Athletic heading the ball equalising the score to 1–1.

It was announced on 8 January 2013 that Nelsen had signed for Canadian MLS side Toronto FC as the club's new head coach. However, he remained under contract with QPR and was in negotiations with their management regarding his release to take up the Toronto position.

It was announced on 22 January 2013 that Nelsen would play his last game for QPR against Manchester City at Loftus Road on 29 January and would join Toronto FC on 1 February. He played his last match for Queens Park Rangers on 29 January in a 0–0 draw against English champions, Manchester City, and was given a guard of honour by his teammates after the game.

== International career ==
Nelsen made his New Zealand debut against Poland on 19 June 1999. He was part of the All Whites' winning squad in the 2002 OFC Nations Cup, scoring the only goal of a 1–0 win over rivals Australia in the final.

Although he has been selected to play on numerous occasions, Nelsen had not represented New Zealand between his last appearance in 2004 and 2008 due largely to a recurring hamstring injury. Nelsen captained the New Zealand U-23 squad for their first appearance at the Olympic Games against China. Although he was only available for the opening two matches as Blackburn had requested that he return in time to prepare for their opening Premier League game of the 2008–09 season against Everton. Nelsen captained the All Whites side as they qualified for the 2010 FIFA World Cup, beating Bahrain in a two-legged playoff in November 2009.

On 10 May 2010, Nelsen was named in New Zealand's final 23-man squad to compete at the 2010 FIFA World Cup.

On 15 June, 28 years to the day after New Zealand made their second appearance in a FIFA World Cup Finals, their first since 1982, Nelsen captained New Zealand to their first ever point in a FIFA World Cup Finals match in a 1–1 draw with World Cup debutants Slovakia. On 24 June, Nelsen again skippered the All Whites in a 0–0 draw with Paraguay, but New Zealand were knocked out of the group stages. However, it is surely indisputable that New Zealand's biggest honour was to draw 1–1 with Italy, who were the reigning champions.

Nelsen was named in a football "World Cup Best XI" by American sports channel, ESPN on 10 July 2010.

== Coaching career ==
On 8 January 2013 Nelsen accepted an offer to become head coach of Major League Soccer side Toronto FC. He started on 1 February in time for Toronto's pre-season. Nelsen won his first game as a head coach in the home opener against Sporting Kansas City in a 2–1 victory on 9 March, with both goals coming from newly acquired striker Robert Earnshaw. He was sacked, along with his assistants, on 31 August 2014 after winning three out of his last 13 matches.

== Writing career ==
Nelsen and New Zealand author Tony Smith co-wrote the book Ryan Nelsen's Road to the World Cup.

== Career statistics ==
=== Club ===
Appearances and goals by club, season and competition
| Club | Season | League | | | National cup | | League cup | | Continental | | Total | |
| Club | Season | Division | Apps | Goals | Apps | Goals | Apps | Goals | Apps | Goals | Apps | Goals |
|---|---|---|---|---|---|---|---|---|---|---|---|---|
| Christchurch United | 1995 | NZ Superclub League | 24 | 2 | 0 | 0 | – | | – | | 24 | 2 |
| Christchurch United | 1996 | Mainland Premier League | 26 | 4 | 2 | 1 | – | | – | | 28 | 5 |
| Christchurch United | 1997 | Mainland Premier League | 22 | 1 | 7 | 2 | – | | – | | 29 | 3 |
| Christchurch United | 1998 | Mainland Premier League | 24 | 5 | 4 | 1 | – | | – | | 28 | 6 |
| Christchurch United | Total | | 96 | 12 | 13 | 4 | 0 | 0 | 0 | 0 | 109 | 16 |
| D.C. United | 2001 | Major League Soccer | 19 | 0 | 0 | 0 | – | | – | | 19 | 0 |
| D.C. United | 2002 | Major League Soccer | 20 | 4 | 0 | 0 | – | | – | | 20 | 4 |
| D.C. United | 2003 | Major League Soccer | 25 | 1 | 2 | 0 | – | | – | | 27 | 1 |
| D.C. United | 2004 | Major League Soccer | 17 | 2 | 3 | 0 | – | | – | | 20 | 2 |
| D.C. United | Total | | 81 | 7 | 5 | 0 | 0 | 0 | 0 | 0 | 86 | 7 |
| Blackburn Rovers | 2004–05 | Premier League | 15 | 0 | 5 | 0 | 0 | 0 | – | | 20 | 0 |
| Blackburn Rovers | 2005–06 | Premier League | 31 | 0 | 0 | 0 | 5 | 0 | – | | 36 | 0 |
| Blackburn Rovers | 2006–07 | Premier League | 12 | 0 | 5 | 0 | 0 | 0 | 2 | 0 | 19 | 0 |
| Blackburn Rovers | 2007–08 | Premier League | 22 | 0 | 1 | 0 | 2 | 0 | 5 | 0 | 30 | 0 |
| Blackburn Rovers | 2008–09 | Premier League | 35 | 1 | 2 | 0 | 2 | 0 | – | | 39 | 1 |
| Blackburn Rovers | 2009–10 | Premier League | 28 | 4 | 0 | 0 | 5 | 0 | – | | 33 | 4 |
| Blackburn Rovers | 2010–11 | Premier League | 28 | 3 | 1 | 0 | 1 | 0 | – | | 30 | 3 |
| Blackburn Rovers | 2011–12 | Premier League | 1 | 0 | 0 | 0 | 0 | 0 | – | | 1 | 0 |
| Blackburn Rovers | Total | | 172 | 8 | 14 | 0 | 15 | 0 | 7 | 0 | 208 | 8 |
| Tottenham Hotspur | 2011–12 | Premier League | 5 | 0 | 3 | 1 | 0 | 0 | 0 | 0 | 8 | 1 |
| Queens Park Rangers | 2012–13 | Premier League | 21 | 1 | 1 | 0 | 2 | 0 | – | | 24 | 1 |
| Career total | | | 375 | 28 | 36 | 5 | 17 | 0 | 7 | 0 | 435 | 33 |

=== International ===
New Zealand's goal tally first.

International appearances and goals
| # | Date | Venue | Opponent | Result | Competition | Goal |
|---|---|---|---|---|---|---|
1999
| 1 | 19 June | Rajamangala Stadium, Bangkok | Poland | 0–0 | International Match | |
| 2 | 22 June | Sultan Qaboos Sports Complex, Muscat | Oman | 0–1 | International Match | |
| 3 | 1 July | Shah Alam Stadium, Kuala Lumpur | Malaysia | 1–2 | International Match | |
| 4 | 3 July | , Kuala Lumpur | Malaysia | 5–1 | International Match | |
| 5 | 10 July | , Mexico City | Egypt | 1–1 | International Match | |
| 6 | 15 July | , Guadalajara | Egypt | 0–1 | International Match | |
| 7 | 24 July | Estadio Jalisco, Guadalajara | United States | 1–2 | 1999 FIFA Confederations Cup | |
| 8 | 28 July | Estadio Jalisco, Guadalajara | Germany | 0–2 | 1999 FIFA Confederations Cup | |
| 9 | 30 July | Estadio Jalisco, Guadalajara | Brazil | 0–2 | 1999 FIFA Confederations Cup | |
2000
| 10 | 13 August | Stadium Merdeka, Kuala Lumpur | Malaysia | 0–0 | 2000 Merdeka Tournament | |
| 11 | 17 August | Stadium Merdeka, Kuala Lumpur | Oman | 1–0 | 2000 Merdeka Tournament | |
| 12 | 19 August | Stadium Merdeka, Kuala Lumpur | Malaysia | 2–0 | 2000 Merdeka Tournament | 1 (1) |
2001
| 13 | 6 June | North Harbour Stadium, Auckland | Tahiti | 5–0 | 2002 FIFA World Cup qualification | |
| 14 | 8 June | North Harbour Stadium, Auckland | Cook Islands | 2–0 | 2002 FIFA World Cup qualification | |
| 15 | 11 June | North Harbour Stadium, Auckland | Solomon Islands | 5–1 | 2002 FIFA World Cup qualification | |
| 16 | 13 June | North Harbour Stadium, Auckland | Vanuatu | 7–0 | 2002 FIFA World Cup qualification | |
| 17 | 20 June | Westpac Stadium, Wellington | Australia | 0–2 | 2002 FIFA World Cup qualification | |
| 18 | 24 June | Stadium Australia, Sydney | Australia | 1–4 | 2002 FIFA World Cup qualification | |
2002
| 19 | 5 July | North Harbour Stadium, Auckland | Tahiti | 4–0 | 2002 OFC Nations Cup | 1 (2) |
| 20 | 7 July | North Harbour Stadium, Auckland | Papua New Guinea | 9–1 | 2002 OFC Nations Cup | 1 (3) |
| 21 | 9 July | North Harbour Stadium, Auckland | Solomon Islands | 6–1 | 2002 OFC Nations Cup | |
| 22 | 12 July | Mount Smart Stadium, Auckland | Vanuatu | 3–0 | 2002 OFC Nations Cup | |
| 23 | 14 July | Mount Smart Stadium, Auckland | Australia | 1–0 | 2002 OFC Nations Cup Final | 1 (4) |
2003
| 24 | 27 May | Tynecastle Stadium, Edinburgh | Scotland | 1–1 | Friendly | 1 (5) |
| 25 | 8 June | City Stadium, Richmond | United States | 1–2 | Friendly | |
| 26 | 18 June | Stade de France, Paris | Japan | 0–3 | 2003 FIFA Confederations Cup | |
| 27 | 20 June | Stade de Gerland, Lyon | Colombia | 1–3 | 2003 FIFA Confederations Cup | |
| 28 | 22 June | Stade de France, Paris | France | 0–5 | 2003 FIFA Confederations Cup | |
| 29 | 12 October | Azadi Stadium, Tehran | Iran | 0–3 | AFC – OFC Challenge Cup | |
2004
| 30 | 2 June | Hindmarsh Stadium, Adelaide | Vanuatu | 2–4 | 2004 OFC Nations Cup | |
| 31 | 4 June | Marden Sports Complex, Adelaide | Tahiti | 10–0 | 2004 OFC Nations Cup | 2 (7) |
| 32 | 6 June | Hindmarsh Stadium, Adelaide | Fiji | 2–0 | 2004 OFC Nations Cup | |
2008
| 33 | 6 September | Stade Numa-Daly Magenta, Nouméa | New Caledonia | 3–1 | 2008 OFC Nations Cup | |
| 34 | 10 September | North Harbour Stadium, Auckland | New Caledonia | 3–0 | 2008 OFC Nations Cup | |
2009
| 35 | 21 March | Suphachalasai Stadium, Bangkok | Thailand | 1–3 | International Match | |
| 36 | 9 September | King Abdullah Stadium, Amman | Jordan | 3–1 | International Match | |
| 37 | 10 October | Bahrain National Stadium, Riffa | Bahrain | 0–0 | 2010 FIFA World Cup qualification | |
| 38 | 14 November | Westpac Stadium, Wellington | Bahrain | 1–0 | 2010 FIFA World Cup qualification | |
2010
| 39 | 24 May | MCG, Melbourne | Australia | 1–2 | International Match | |
| 40 | 29 May | Hypo-Arena, Klagenfurt | Serbia | 1–0 | International Match | |
| 41 | 1 June | Ljudski vrt, Maribor | Slovenia | 1–3 | International Match | |
| 42 | 15 June | Royal Bafokeng Stadium, Rustenburg | Slovakia | 1–1 | 2010 FIFA World Cup | |
| 43 | 21 June | Mbombela Stadium, Nelspruit | Italy | 1–1 | 2010 FIFA World Cup | |
| 44 | 25 June | Peter Mokaba Stadium, Polokwane | Paraguay | 0–0 | 2010 FIFA World Cup | |
| 45 | 9 October | North Harbour Stadium, Auckland | Honduras | 1–1 | International Match | |
2012
| 46 | 29 February | Mount Smart Stadium, Auckland | Jamaica | 2–3 | International Match | |
| 47 | 7 September | Stade Numa-Daly Magenta, Nouméa | New Caledonia | 2–0 | 2014 FIFA World Cup qualification | |
| 48 | 11 September | North Harbour Stadium, Auckland | Solomon Islands | 6–1 | 2014 FIFA World Cup qualification | |
| 49 | 16 October | AMI Stadium, Christchurch | Tahiti | 3–0 | 2014 FIFA World Cup qualification | |

== Managerial statistics ==
As of 31 August 2014.

| Team | From | To | Record | | | | | | | |
| Team | From | To | G | W | D | L | GF | GA | GD | Win % |
|---|---|---|---|---|---|---|---|---|---|---|
| Toronto FC | 8 January 2013 | 31 August 2014 | 64 | 17 | 18 | 29 | 71 | 97 | −26 | 26.56 |

== Honours ==
In the 2011 New Year Honours, Nelsen was appointed an Officer of the New Zealand Order of Merit for services to football.

D.C. United

- MLS Cup: 2004

Blackburn Rovers

- UEFA Intertoto Cup: 2007

New Zealand

- OFC Nations Cup: 2002, 2008
- Merdeka Cup: 2000

Individual

- MLS Best XI 2003, 2004
- IFFHS OFC Men's Team of the Decade 2011–2020
- IFFHS Oceania Men's Team of All Time: 2021
- Oceania Footballer of the Year: 2006, 2010

== See also ==
- New Zealand at the FIFA World Cup
- List of New Zealand international footballers
