= Nick Van Sicklen =

American soccer player

Personal information
- Date of birth: 1 February 1976 (age 50)
- Place of birth: United States
- Positions: Midfielder; winger; forward

College career
Years	Team	Apps	(Gls)
2001–2004	Wisconsin Badgers		

Senior career*
Years	Team	Apps	(Gls)
2005	D.C. United	0	(0)
2006–2007	Canterbury United		
- * Club domestic league appearances and goals

Nick Van Sicklen (born 1 February 1976) is an American retired soccer player.

== Career ==
After an unsuccessful trial with Nurnberg in the German top flight, which an agent invited him to, Van Sicklen was drafted by MLS side D.C. United in 2005. Despite this, Van Sicklen said initially that "playing professionally wasn't even on the radar" and that he "was satisfied playing Division I [college soccer]". However, he only made two appearances for D.C. United, both in the CONCACAF Champions League, and eventually asked to be released. Within half a year, he signed for Canterbury United in New Zealand amid interest from MLS clubs Houston Dynamo as well as New York Red Bulls.
