= 2002 D.C. United season =

D.C. United
2002 season
- Owner: D.C. United Holdings
- Head coach: Ray Hudson
- MLS: Conference: 5th Overall: 10th
- MLS Cup Playoffs: Did not qualify
- U.S. Open Cup: Did not qualify
- CONCACAF Champions' Cup: First round
- Atlantic Cup: Winners
- Top goalscorer: League: All: Curtis; Convey (05)
| Home colors | Away colors |

The 2002 D.C. United season was the clubs' eighth year of existence, as well as their seventh season in Major League Soccer.

Under second-year head coach, Ray Hudson, United failed to qualify for the playoffs for the third consecutive season, a dry spell that would not be achieved again until the 2011 United season.

== League standings ==
=== Division ===
| Pos | Team | Pld | W | L | T | GF | GA | GD | Pts | Qualification |
|---|---|---|---|---|---|---|---|---|---|---|
| 1 | New England Revolution | 28 | 12 | 14 | 2 | 49 | 49 | 0 | 38 | MLS Cup Playoffs |
| 2 | Columbus Crew | 28 | 11 | 12 | 5 | 44 | 43 | +1 | 38 | MLS Cup Playoffs |
| 3 | Chicago Fire | 28 | 11 | 13 | 4 | 43 | 38 | +5 | 37 | MLS Cup Playoffs |
| 4 | MetroStars | 28 | 11 | 15 | 2 | 41 | 47 | −6 | 35 | |
| 5 | D.C. United | 28 | 9 | 14 | 5 | 31 | 40 | −9 | 32 | |

Source: MLS

=== Overall ===
| Pos | Team | Pld | W | L | T | GF | GA | GD | Pts | Qualification |
|---|---|---|---|---|---|---|---|---|---|---|
| 1 | Los Angeles Galaxy (C, S) | 28 | 16 | 9 | 3 | 44 | 33 | +11 | 51 | CONCACAF Champions' Cup |
| 2 | San Jose Earthquakes | 28 | 14 | 11 | 3 | 45 | 35 | +10 | 45 | CONCACAF Champions' Cup |
| 3 | Dallas Burn | 28 | 12 | 9 | 7 | 44 | 43 | +1 | 43 | |
| 4 | Colorado Rapids | 28 | 13 | 11 | 4 | 43 | 48 | −5 | 43 | |
| 5 | New England Revolution | 28 | 12 | 14 | 2 | 49 | 49 | 0 | 38 | CONCACAF Champions' Cup |
| 6 | Columbus Crew | 28 | 11 | 12 | 5 | 44 | 43 | +1 | 38 | CONCACAF Champions' Cup |
| 7 | Chicago Fire | 28 | 11 | 13 | 4 | 43 | 38 | +5 | 37 | |
| 8 | Kansas City Wizards | 28 | 9 | 10 | 9 | 37 | 45 | −8 | 36 | |
| 9 | MetroStars | 28 | 11 | 15 | 2 | 41 | 47 | −6 | 35 | |
| 10 | D.C. United | 28 | 9 | 14 | 5 | 31 | 40 | −9 | 32 | |

Source: MLS
Rules for classification: 1) points; 2) head-to-head record; 3) goal difference; 4) number of goals scored
(C) Champions; (S) Supporters' Shield

==== Match reports ====
| March 22, 2002 1 | Los Angeles Galaxy | 2–1 | D.C. United | Pasadena, California |
| 20:00 EST | Ruíz 85', 92+' | Report | Curtis 76' | Stadium: Rose Bowl; Attendance: 20,602 |

| March 30, 2002 2 | D.C. United | 2–0 | Chicago Fire | Washington, D.C. |
| 16:00 EST | Etcheverry 39'; Conteh 46' | Report | | Stadium: RFK Stadium; Attendance: 15,033 |

| April 3, 2002 3 | Colorado Rapids | 2–0 | D.C. United | Denver, Colorado |
| 19:00 EST | Henderson 44', 89' | Report | | Stadium: Invesco Field at Mile High; Attendance: 48,476 |

| April 6, 2002 4 | Dallas Burn | 2–1 | D.C. United | Dallas |
| 18:00 EST | Kreis 63'; Rodríguez 84' | Report | Quaranta 61' | Stadium: Cotton Bowl; Attendance: 8,565 |

| April 20, 2002 5 | D.C. United | 2–1 | Kansas City Wizards | Washington, D.C. |
| 17:00 EST | Curtis 71'; McKinley 92+' | Report | Preki 73' | Stadium: RFK Stadium; Attendance: 12,759 |

| April 27, 2002 6 | Columbus Crew | 1–0 | D.C. United | Columbus, Ohio |
| 17:00 EST | Maisonneuve 15' | Report | | Stadium: Crew Stadium; Attendance: 14,997 |

| May 4, 2002 7 | D.C. United | 0–3 | Chicago Fire | Washington, D.C. |
| 15:00 EST | | Report | Daniv 26'; Nowak 55'; Razov 59' | Stadium: RFK Stadium; Attendance: 11,767 |

| May 12, 2002 7 | D.C. United | 1–1 | Columbus Crew | Washington, D.C. |
| 15:00 EST | Santino Quaranta 45' | Report | Dante Washington 67' | Stadium: RFK Stadium; Attendance: 30,413 |

=== CONCACAF Champions' Cup ===
| February 3, 2002 First round | Comunicaciones (Guatemala) | 4–0 | (United States) D.C. United | Guatemala City, Guatemala |
| 21:00 UTC−5 | | | | Stadium: Progress Cements Stadium |

| March 27, 2002 First round | D.C. United (United States) | 2–1 (2–5 agg.) | (Guatemala) Comunicaciones | Washington, D.C., United States |
| 20:00 UTC−5 | | | | Stadium: RFK Memorial Stadium |

=== Exhibitions ===
| June 23, 2002 | D.C. United (United States) | 0–0 | (Argentina) Boca Juniors | Washington, D.C., United States |
| 16:00 UTC−5 | | | | Stadium: RFK Memorial Stadium |

| October 17, 2002 | Tottenham Hotspur (England) | 0–1 | (United States) D.C. United | London, England |
| 00:00 UTC−5 | | | | Stadium: White Hart Lane |

| October 26, 2002 | D.C. United (United States) | 4–0 | (El Salvador) Águila | Washington, D.C., United States |
| 16:00 UTC−5 | | | | Stadium: RFK Memorial Stadium |
