= Nana Kuffour =

Ghanaian footballer (born 1985)

Mohammed Tuah Khamis (born 27 February 1985) is a Ghanaian former footballer and current coach.

== Career ==
=== Playing career ===
==== Club ====
Nana Kwame Kuffour was born in Nyakrom, Ghana. The forward was signed by D.C. United as a developmental player during the 2004 season, after having immigrated to the United States from Ghana and receiving citizenship. Before playing for United, Kuffour most recently played for Super Rainbows of Ghana. Kuffour was released by D.C. United in November 2005 and joined to Liberty Professionals FC after three years with the club signed for Accra Hearts of Oak SC on 18 October 2009.

===== Clubs =====
- Apam Secondary School (2001–2003)
- Super Rainbows (2003)
- Assi National FC (2004)
- D.C. United (2004–2005)
- Liberty Professionals FC (2005–2009)
- Accra Hearts of Oak SC (2009–2010)

==== International career ====
Kuffour was a member of the Black Meteors.

=== Coaching ===
After his retirement in 2017 became U-16 Head coach at Liberty Professionals F.C. and later for West African Football Academy, before began his senior coaching career in March 2019 named as Head coach for Madina Republicans FC and worked there until his release in early 2020. He is currently coach and owner of the Tuah Khamis Football Academy in Shukura a suburb of Ablekuma Central, in the Greater Accra Region.

== Personal life ==
Mohammed Tuah Khamis was born as Nana Kwame Kuffour and converted to Islam in 2006.
