= Matt Nickell =

American soccer player

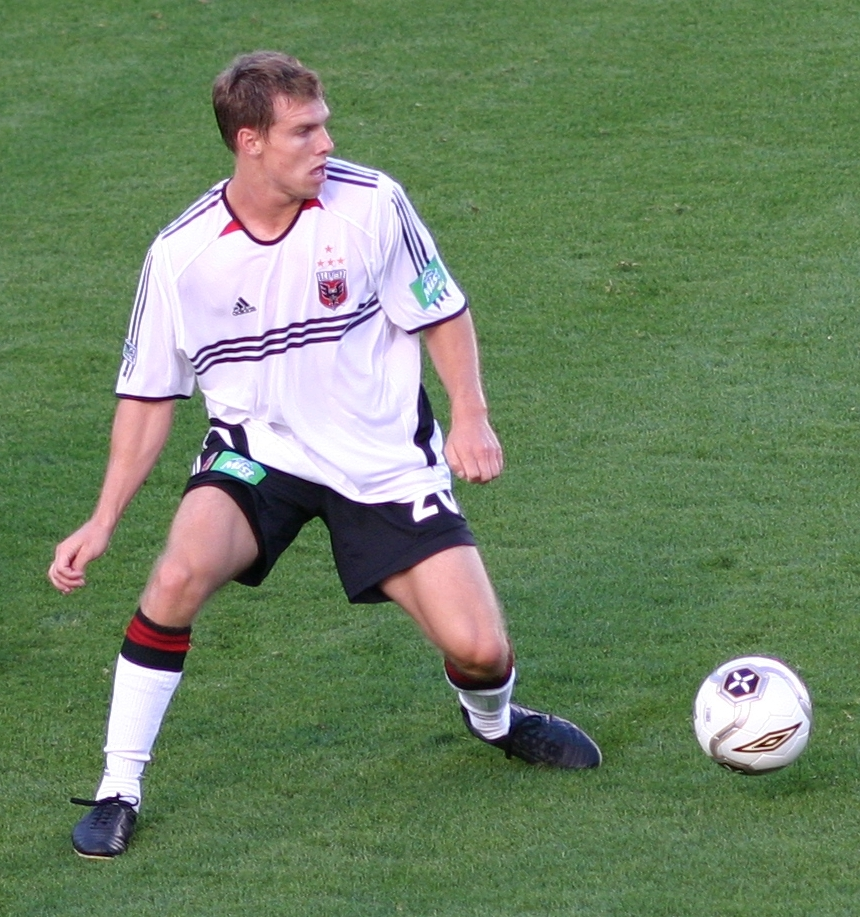

Personal information
- Date of birth: July 11, 1983 (age 43)
- Place of birth: Waukee, Iowa, United States
- Height: 5 ft 11 in (1.80 m)
- Position: Forward

Youth career
- 2001–2004: Drake Bulldogs

Senior career*
Years	Team	Apps	(Gls)
2003	Des Moines Menace	5	(0)
2005–2006	D.C. United	7	(0)
- * Club domestic league appearances and goals as of 24 November 2006 ‡ National team caps and goals as of 24 November 2006

Matt Nickell (born July 11, 1983) is an American soccer player.

== Career ==
Nickell played college for Drake University Soccer from 2001 to 2004. In his four seasons there he accumulated 31 goals and 22 assists. In 2003, his junior year, he set the Drake single-season record for goals with 13.

He was selected in the first round 12th overall in the 2005 MLS Supplemental Draft by the D.C. United. Following the 2006 season, he was waived by the team.
