= Jason Thompson (soccer) =

American soccer player

Personal information
- Date of birth: November 11, 1981 (age 44)
- Place of birth: Garland, Texas
- Position: Striker

College career
Years	Team	Apps	(Gls)
2000–2002	Eastern Illinois University		(40)

Senior career*
Years	Team	Apps	(Gls)
2003–2004	Dallas Burn	1	
2004–2005	D.C. United	2	
Total		3	
- * Club domestic league appearances and goals

Jason Thompson (born on November 22, 1981, in Garland, Texas) is an American soccer player who last played striker for D.C. United of Major League Soccer.

Thompson played college soccer at Eastern Illinois University from 2000 to 2002. Thompson had a very strong start in his freshman year, surprising everybody by scoring 21 goals to lead the NCAA Division I, and was named the Missouri Valley Conference Newcomer of the Year and chosen for Soccer America's All-Freshman team. Thompson's next year was mediocre, due to injuries, as he scored only five goals. Thompson did significantly better in 2002, however, finishing the year with 14 goals and four assists, earning him a first-team All-Midwest selection. Because of his performances for the Under-23 United States Men's National Soccer Team, Thompson was offered a Nike Project-40 contract after his junior season, which he accepted.

As well as still holding the school record for the most goals scored in a single season (21 goals in 2000), Thompson is also the record holder for most goals scored in a single game, when he scored six in a 2002 match up with the Belmont Bruins.

Thompson was selected 15th overall, in the 2003 MLS SuperDraft by his hometown Dallas Burn. Unfortunately, Thompson tore his ACL during the preseason while playing with the U-23 team, and missed all of the 2003 season. On returning in 2004, Thompson had trouble breaking into new coach Colin Clarke's veteran-dominated lineup and was traded to D.C. United. Competition among forwards was equally strong at D.C., however, and although Thompson played a target forward role unlike United's other strikers, he only made one appearance for the team, coming on as a substitute and playing 60 minutes. D.C. United went on to win the 2004 MLS Cup with a 3–2 victory over Kansas City Wizards, at The Home Depot Center in Carson, California. Thompson went on to play the entire 2005 season with D.C. United, one that saw United finish second in the Eastern Conference, before he was released into the waiver draft of that subsequent off-season.

Thompson completed his Doctor of Medicine at The University of Texas School of Medicine at San Antonio. He is currently an Orthopedic Surgery Resident at The University of Texas School of Medicine at San Antonio.

Once Thompson completed his residency in San Antonio, he completed an additional year of fellowship in Canada focusing on orthopedic joints. There he specifically focused on the complex hips and knee cases in North America. Now, Dr. Thompson is practicing orthopedics in Corpus Christi, TX with South Texas Bone and Joint where he has become one of the orthopedic joint doctors in South Texas.
