= Ali Curtis =

American soccer player and executive (born 1978)

Personal information
- Date of birth: December 18, 1978 (age 47)
- Place of birth: Philadelphia, Pennsylvania, U.S.
- Height: 5 ft 10 in (1.78 m)
- Position: Forward

College career
Years	Team	Apps	(Gls)
1997–2000	Duke Blue Devils		

Senior career*
Years	Team	Apps	(Gls)
2001	Tampa Bay Mutiny	20	(2)
2002–2003	D.C. United	37	(6)
2003	Dallas Burn	8	(1)
Total		65	(9)
- * Club domestic league appearances and goals

Ali Curtis (born December 18, 1978) is a sports executive and former American soccer player. Curtis is the President of MLS NEXT Pro and Executive Vice President of MLS Sporting Development since 2025.

He was the 1999 Hermann Trophy and 2000 MAC Award winner before playing in Major League Soccer from 2001 to 2004. Curtis became the first African American General Manager in Major League Soccer's history when he joined the New York Red Bulls in 2014. He was the General Manager of Toronto FC from 2019 to 2021.

== Career ==
=== College ===
A native of Ann Arbor, MI, Ali Curtis had an extraordinary career playing college soccer at Duke University, where he scored 53 goals and 28 assists from 1997 to 2000, and, in his junior season won the Hermann Trophy, and in his senior season won the MAC Award, both recognizing college soccer's best player. He ranks as the all-time leading goal-scorer in Duke soccer history.

=== MLS ===
After graduating from Duke, Curtis was drafted second overall in the 2001 MLS SuperDraft by the Tampa Bay Mutiny. From 2001 through 2004, Curtis spent time with three MLS Clubs - Tampa Bay Mutiny, D.C. United and FC Dallas (formerly Dallas Burn).

== Post-playing career ==
During college, Curtis studied finance and worked on Wall Street in the summer. After Curtis's playing career, he worked for the investment bank JP Morgan from 2004 through 2007. He worked in JP Morgan's Chicago and Los Angeles offices. In 2007, Curtis returned to MLS and held various positions in the league office, and was eventually appointed the league's Senior Director of Player Relations and Competition.

On December 23, 2014, the New York Red Bulls hired Curtis to replace Andy Roxburgh as the club's sporting director. In his first season in charge New York captured the Eastern Conference regular season title and the MLS Supporters' Shield. After another winning season in 2016, Curtis left the Red Bull organization shortly before the 2017 season. During his tenure at Red Bull, Curtis achieved success in multiple areas - player signings (Tyler Adams, Kemar Lawrence, Aaron Long, etc.), player transfers (Matt Miazga/Chelsea FC), player development (USL Champion).

On 4 January 2019, Curtis was named the general manager of Toronto FC. Toronto FC finished the 2021 MLS season in second-last place, and on November 22, 2021, Curtis left his post as general manager. Curtis' final season at TFC was seen as largely disappointing, defined by the hiring of Chris Armas who was terminated only 171 days after his appointment, and a controversial off-field incident which saw Toronto FC striker Jozy Altidore exiled from the club for 2 months.

Curtis was appointed Vice President of MLS Next Pro in December 2021. In September 2025, Curtis succeeded Charles Altchek as President of MLS Next Pro. He also currently serves as Executive Vice President of MLS Sporting Development.

=== Personal life ===
Curtis is married to a marketing executive who works for Creative Artist Agency. He and his wife have two children.
