= Joshua Gros =

American soccer player (born 1982)

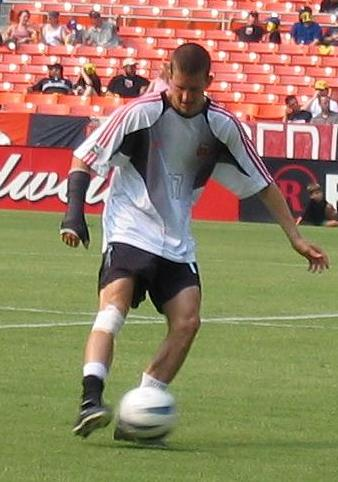

Personal information
- Date of birth: June 25, 1982 (age 44)
- Place of birth: Mechanicsburg, Pennsylvania, United States
- Height: 6 ft 0 in (1.83 m)
- Position: Midfielder

Youth career
- 1996–2000: Cumberland Valley High School

College career
Years	Team	Apps	(Gls)
2000–2003	Rutgers Scarlet Knights		

Senior career*
Years	Team	Apps	(Gls)
2004–2007	D.C. United	110	(9)

International career
2007	United States	1	(0)

Managerial career
- 2009: Northern Virginia Royals (assistant)
- * Club domestic league appearances and goals

Joshua Gros (born June 25, 1982) is an American former professional soccer player who played as a midfielder. Gros is the team coordinator for the Philadelphia Union, a Major League Soccer team. He was hired on June 11, 2009, under head coach Piotr Nowak. Nowak coached Gros on the 2004 MLS Cup-champion D.C. United. Nowak had previously hired him as an assistant when he led the USA Olympic team to Beijing in 2008.

== Career ==
=== College ===
Gros was born in Mechanicsburg, Pennsylvania, on June 25, 1982. He played college soccer at Rutgers University from 2000 to 2003. As a freshman, Gros started 15 matches and led the team with seven assists. Although he moved into a consistent starting role as a sophomore, he only registered three points, all on assists. Upon moving to the offensive midfield as a junior, Gros's production increased sharply and he finished the year with six goals and one assist. Gros far bettered this as a senior, finishing the year with 16 goals and five assists, and was named the Big East offensive player of the year. He was also chosen to be National Player of the Week on September 22, 2003, by College Soccer News. During his professional career, however, Gros gradually took on a more defensive role.

=== Professional ===
Gros was selected 34th overall in the 2004 MLS SuperDraft by D.C. United, and immediately impressed during preseason, earning himself a spot on the regular season lineup. Gros intended to join the Marine Corps had he not made the team. However, he did make the team, and soon his work rate earned him a surprise spot in the D.C. starting lineup. Gros seized this opportunity. His excellent, determined play made him a starter for much of the year, playing midfield on either wing or left back. He finished the year with 21 starts and 2087 minutes, in which he scored a goal and notched four assists. Gros continued to start for United throughout the 2005 and 2006 seasons. In 2006, he was named an MLS All-Star and played the entire All-Star Game against Chelsea.

In the 2007 MLS season, Gros started and played in 21 games for United, despite having suffered numerous head traumas. Following the season, he announced his retirement as a result of his accumulated head injuries.

=== International ===
Gros earned his only cap with the U.S. national team in a 2–0 victory over Mexico on February 7, 2007.

== Personal life ==
His nickname amongst D.C. United player was “The Sarge”.

After retirement from playing due to head trauma he initially trained and worked as a civil engineer. He worked on designing projects for the U.S. Navy and Air Force.

== Career statistics ==
Appearances and goals by club, season and competition
Club	Season	League			Open Cup		League Cup		North America		Total	
Club	Season	Division	Apps	Goals	Apps	Goals	Apps	Goals	Apps	Goals	Apps	Goals
DC United	2004	MLS	29	1								
DC United	2005	MLS	30	4								
DC United	2006	MLS	29	3								
DC United	2007	MLS	22	1								
Career total			110	9								

== Honors ==
D.C. United

- Major League Soccer Supporter's Shield: 2006, 2007
