= David Stokes (soccer) =

American soccer player

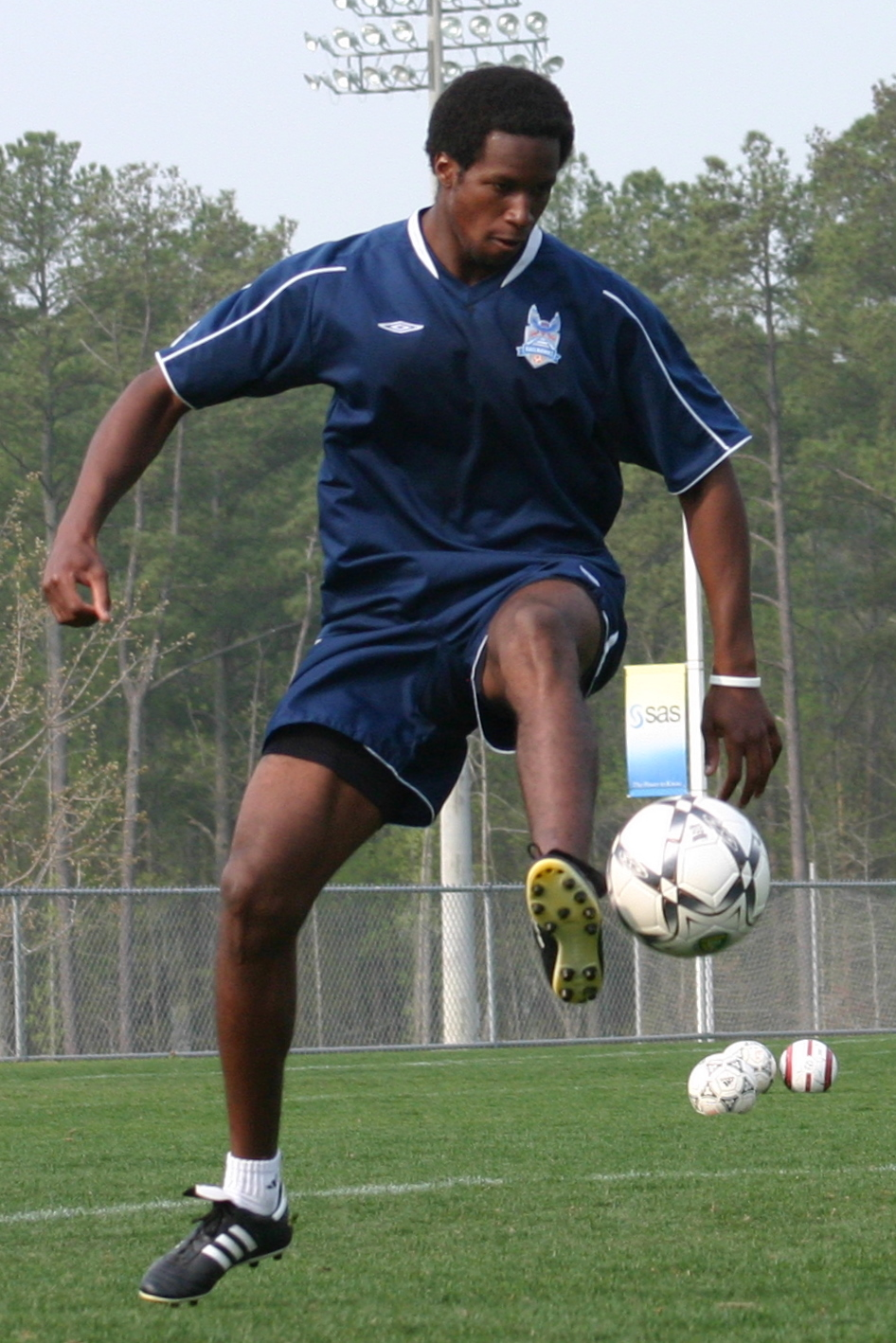
- Stokes in March 2007

Personal information
- Full name: David Stokes
- Date of birth: May 28, 1982 (age 44)
- Place of birth: Dumfries, Virginia, U.S.
- Height: 6 ft 3 in (1.91 m)
- Position: Defender

College career
Years	Team	Apps	(Gls)
2000–2002	North Carolina Tar Heels		

Senior career*
Years	Team	Apps	(Gls)
2002	Raleigh CASL Elite	13	(1)
2003–2006	D.C. United	24	(0)
2003	→ Virginia Beach Mariners (loan)	8	(0)
2007–2008	Carolina RailHawks	44	(1)
- * Club domestic league appearances and goals as of September 30, 2008

David Stokes (born May 28, 1982, Dumfries, Virginia) is an American former professional soccer player, who last played three seasons in Major League Soccer and two in the USL First Division.

== Early life and education ==
Stokes attended high school at C.D. Hylton High School in Woodbridge, Virginia where he won back to back Virginia AAA state championships. His high school team received a #1 national ranking in 1998. Stokes played club soccer for the Braddock Road Youth Club, where he won three Virginia State Cups and a USYSA National Championship in 1999. Stokes also won an indoor National Championship with Braddock Road.

Stokes then played three years of college soccer at the University of North Carolina at Chapel Hill from 2000 to 2002. As a sophomore, Stokes was named Defensive MVP of the College Cup as he helped UNC to a national championship.

== Club career ==
=== Professional ===
After finishing his junior season, Stokes signed a Project-40 contract with MLS. Hailed as the second-coming of Eddie Pope, Stokes was selected 5th overall in the 2003 MLS SuperDraft by D.C. United. Although Stokes' athleticism was clear, he did not receive the opportunity to play in regular season action during his rookie year. He did appear in U.S. Open Cup games for United, friendly matches (including a win against Blackburn Rovers) and made appearances on loan with the Virginia Beach Mariners. After Ray Hudson was released, many expected Stokes to play a larger role in Peter Nowak's team. Stokes had a promising beginning to the 2005 season in which he saw action in the CONCACAF champions cup and began the MLS regular season in the starting eleven. A concussion sidelined Stokes in the early part of his campaign. After recovering from this, he had another setback after he suffered a harsh tackle resulting in cartilage damage in his left ankle. The injury required surgery and ended Stokes' '05 season. Stokes worked hard to recover earlier than expected and arrived fit to play in the '06 preseason, but 2 quadriceps tears sidelined Stokes once again until the late summer. Stokes worked his way back into the first team after reserve team appearances but did not receive much playing time in his last season with DC.

After his tenure with DC, Stokes overcame his injuries and signed with the Carolina Railhawks. He was able to return to school and continue to play as well. Stokes helped Carolina to back to back Southern Derby Cup championships and plans on graduating from UNC in the summer of 2009.

=== International ===
Stokes played for the United States under-23 men's national soccer team in the qualification rounds, notching the game winning assist in the group phase play vs. Honduras which locked the team into first place going into the semi-final. This talented group failed to qualify, however, after losing to Mexico in Mexico in front of their crowd of 60,000+.
