= 2004 Dallas Burn season =

Dallas Burn
2004 season
- Owner: Lamar Hunt
- Head coach: Colin Clarke
- Stadium: Cotton Bowl
- MLS: Conference: 5th Overall: 8th
- U.S. Open Cup: Lost Quarterfinal vs. Kansas City Wizards (0–4)
- Brimstone Cup: Won Championship vs. Chicago Fire (2–0)
- Average home league attendance: 9,088
| Home colors | Away colors |

The 2004 Dallas Burn season was the eighth season of the Major League Soccer team. The season saw the team fail to make the playoffs for the second consecutive year. The season was also the first full season under head coach Colin Clarke. The team moved from Dragon Stadium back to the Cotton Bowl. It would be the last full season for the team in the Cotton Bowl, as they would move to their current stadium in Frisco in 2005. It was also the team's final season as the Burn. With the move to their own stadium the next year, the team would be rebranded as FC Dallas in 2005. Burn forward Eddie Johnson shared the Golden Boot Award with Brian Ching, tying him for the most goals in the MLS with 12. Johnson was the second Burn player to win the award, with Jason Kreis previously winning it in 1999.

== Regular season ==
| Pos | Team | Pld | W | L | T | GF | GA | GD | Pts | Qualification |
|---|---|---|---|---|---|---|---|---|---|---|
| 1 | Kansas City Wizards | 30 | 14 | 9 | 7 | 38 | 30 | +8 | 49 | MLS Cup Playoffs |
| 2 | Los Angeles Galaxy | 30 | 11 | 9 | 10 | 42 | 40 | +2 | 43 | MLS Cup Playoffs |
| 3 | Colorado Rapids | 30 | 10 | 9 | 11 | 29 | 32 | −3 | 41 | MLS Cup Playoffs |
| 4 | San Jose Earthquakes | 30 | 9 | 10 | 11 | 41 | 35 | +6 | 38 | MLS Cup Playoffs |
| 5 | Dallas Burn | 30 | 10 | 14 | 6 | 34 | 45 | −11 | 36 | |

Source: MLS

| April 3, 2004 1 | Colorado Rapids | 1–1 | Dallas Burn | Dallas, Texas |
| 7:30 PM CST | Spencer 36'; Powell (yellow card) 22'; Henderson (yellow card) 66' (yellow-red card) 87' | Report at the Wayback Machine (archived August 10, 2004) | Valakari (yellow card) 15'; Gibbs (yellow card) 19'; Rhine 75' (pen.) | Stadium: Cotton Bowl; Attendance: 7,359; Referee: Terry Vaughn; Assistant referees: Chris Strickland; Thomas Supple; Fourth official: Jair Marrufo |

| April 17, 2004 2 Brimstone Cup | Dallas Burn | 2–0 | Chicago Fire | Chicago, Illinois |
| 7:30 PM CDT | Salyer (yellow card) 14'; Johnson 27'; Rhine 70' (yellow card) 90'; Valakari (yellow card) 65' | Report at the Wayback Machine (archived May 3, 2006) | Whitfield (yellow card) 44'; Williams (yellow card) 72' | Stadium: Soldier Field; Attendance: 12,828; Referee: Kevin Stott; Assistant referees: George Gansner; David Bragg; Fourth official: Ramon Hernandez |

| April 24, 2004 3 | Kansas City Wizards | 0–1 | Dallas Burn | Dallas, Texas |
| 7:30 PM CDT | Garcia (yellow card) 45' | Report at the Wayback Machine (archived May 3, 2006) | Nhleko 17'; Jolley (yellow card) 87' | Stadium: Cotton Bowl; Attendance: 10,269; Referee: Gus St. Silva; Assistant referees: Greg Barkey; Jose Corro; Fourth official: Terry Vaughn |

| May 1, 2004 4 | Dallas Burn | 0–0 | Columbus Crew | Columbus, Ohio |
| 7:30 PM EDT | Gbandi (yellow card) 30'; Valakari (yellow card) 76' | Report at the Wayback Machine (archived May 3, 2006) | Buddle (yellow card) 24'; Maisonneuve (yellow card) 55' | Stadium: Columbus Crew Stadium; Attendance: 13,271; Referee: Ramon Hernandez; Assistant referees: Jose Andrade; Steven Taylor; Fourth official: Alex Prus |

| May 8, 2004 5 | Los Angeles | 3–1 | Dallas Burn | Dallas, Texas |
| 3:00 PM CDT | Kirovski 57', 65'; Ruiz 94+' | Report at the Wayback Machine (archived May 3, 2006) | Nhleko 6'; Gbandi (yellow card) 87' | Stadium: Cotton Bowl; Attendance: 6,755; Referee: Abiodun Okulaja; Assistant referees: George Vergara; David Bragg; Fourth official: Marcel Yonan |

| May 15, 2004 6 | San Jose Earthquakes | 2–1 | Dallas Burn | Dallas, Texas |
| 7:30 PM CDT | Donovan 13' (yellow card) 95+'; Ching 46+'; Russell (yellow card) 70' | Report at the Wayback Machine (archived May 3, 2006) | Valakari (yellow card) 22'; Johnson 66'; Rhine (yellow card) 73'; Jolley (yellow card) 74' | Stadium: Cotton Bowl; Attendance: 8,498; Referee: Marcel Yonan; Assistant referees: Greg Barkey; Bill Dittmar; Fourth official: Richard Heron |

| May 22, 2004 7 | Dallas Burn | 0–2 | Kansas City Wizards | Kansas City, Missouri |
| 7:30 PM CDT | Behncke (yellow card) 8'; Gbandi (yellow card) 19' | Report at the Wayback Machine (archived June 16, 2004) | Jewsbury 60'; Wolff 67' | Stadium: Arrowhead Stadium; Attendance: 10,013; Referee: Abiodun Okulaja; Assistant referees: Nathan Clement; Richard Eddy; Fourth official: Tony Crush |

| May 29, 2004 8 | Dallas Burn | 1–4 | Los Angeles Galaxy | Carson, California |
| 7:00 PM PDT | O'Brien (yellow card) 34' (goal) 71' | Report at the Wayback Machine (archived June 19, 2004) | Victorine 9'; Jolley 65' (o.g.); Kirovski 72', 94+' | Stadium: The Home Depot Center; Attendance: 18,460; Referee: Michael Kennedy; Assistant referees: Chip Reed; Paul Scott; Fourth official: Baldomero Toledo |

| June 5, 2004 9 | Dallas Burn | 2–0 | MetroStars | East Rutherford, New Jersey |
| 7:30 PM EDT | Talley (yellow card) 20'; Johnson 51'; Gbandi (yellow card) 68'; Nhleko 90' | Report at the Wayback Machine (archived June 7, 2004) | Guevara (yellow card) 68' | Stadium: Giants Stadium; Attendance: 11,519; Referee: Gus St. Silva; Assistant referees: Craig Lowry; David Bragg; Fourth official: Andrew Chapin |

| June 12, 2004 10 | New England Revolution | 1–3 | Dallas Burn | Dallas, Texas |
| 7:30 PM CDT | Dempsey 52'; Franchino (red card) 89' | Report at the Wayback Machine (archived June 25, 2004) | Kreis 12'; Valakari (yellow card) 32' (yellow-red card) 89'; Johnson 74'; Nhleko 84' | Stadium: Cotton Bowl; Attendance: 6,941; Referee: Alex Prus; Assistant referees: Chip Reed; Paul Scott; Fourth official: Adam Garner |

| June 19, 2004 11 | Dallas Burn | 1–1 | Colorado Rapids | Denver, Colorado |
| 7:00 PM MDT | Behncke (yellow card) 43'; Kreis 49' (yellow card) 74'; Gbandi (yellow card) 81'; Talley (yellow card) 92+' | Report at the Wayback Machine (archived June 22, 2004) | Henderson 51'; Powell (yellow card) 37' (yellow-red card) 87'; Beckerman (yellow card) 45'; Spencer (yellow card) 82' | Stadium: Invesco Field at Mile High; Attendance: 9,277; Referee: Kevin Stott; Assistant referees: Kermit Quisenberry; Fabio Tovar; Fourth official: Hilario Grajeda |

| June 26, 2004 12 | D.C. United | 1–1 | Dallas Burn | Dallas, Texas |
| 3:00 PM CDT | Hendrickson (yellow card) 36'; Eskandarian 58'; Namoff (yellow card) 70' | Report at the Wayback Machine (archived September 3, 2004) | Talley (yellow card) 8'; Salyer (yellow card) 35'; Kreis 37' | Stadium: Cotton Bowl; Attendance: 13,833; Referee: Gus St. Silva; Assistant referees: Steven Davidson; Emiliano Monje; Fourth official: Paul Hooks |

| July 3, 2004 13 | Dallas Burn | 1–5 | Kansas City Wizards | Kansas City, Missouri |
| 7:30 PM CDT | Kreis 31' (red card) 45'; Jolley (yellow card) 45' | Report at the Wayback Machine (archived August 4, 2004) | Arnaud 22', 79', 90'; Garcia (yellow card) 60'; Klein 72'; Wolff 75' | Stadium: Arrowhead Stadium; Attendance: 20,011; Referee: Richard Heron; Assistant referees: Kermit Quisenberry; Jose Andrade; Fourth official: Shane Butler |

| July 7, 2004 14 | Dallas Burn | 2–1 | San Jose Earthquakes | San Jose, California |
| 7:30 PM PDT | Valakari (yellow card) 1' (goal) 89'; Quill 6' | Report at the Wayback Machine (archived August 4, 2004) | Corrales 10' (yellow card) 11'; Ching (yellow card) 40' | Stadium: Spartan Stadium; Attendance: 9,350; Referee: Hector Tobon; Assistant referees: Craig Lowry; Chip Reed; Fourth official: Ricardo Valenzuela |

| July 10, 2004 15 | Columbus Crew | 0–0 | Dallas Burn | Dallas, Texas |
| 7:30 PM CDT | | Report at the Wayback Machine (archived October 11, 2004) | Reyes (yellow card) 22'; O'Brien (yellow card) 90'; Gbandi (yellow card) 93+' | Stadium: Cotton Bowl; Attendance: 7,223; Referee: Terry Vaughn; Assistant referees: David Bragg; Adam Garner; Fourth official: Troy Travis |

| July 17, 2004 16 | Kansas City Wizards | 1–0 | Dallas Burn | Dallas, Texas |
| 7:30 PM CDT | Gutiérrez 42'; Thomas (yellow card) 44' (yellow-red card) 75'; Garcia (yellow card) 51'; Jewsbury (yellow card) 73' | Report at the Wayback Machine (archived September 3, 2004) | Nhleko (yellow card) 27'; Gbandi (yellow card) 34' | Stadium: Cotton Bowl; Attendance: 6,942; Referee: Hilario Grajeda; Assistant referees: Greg Barkey; Jose Corro; Fourth official: Kevin Terry |

| July 24, 2004 17 | D.C. United | 1–5 | Dallas Burn | Dallas, Texas |
| 7:30 PM CDT | Gibbs 34' (o.g.); Ara (yellow card) 87' | Report at the Wayback Machine (archived August 10, 2004) | Jolley 10'; Johnson 31', 73'; Davis 46+', 63'; Salyer (yellow card) 60'; Rhine (yellow card) 90' | Stadium: Cotton Bowl; Attendance: 11,088; Referee: Abiodun Okulaja; Assistant referees: Robert Fereday; Richard Eddy; Fourth official: Brent Sorg |

| July 28, 2004 18 | Dallas Burn | 1–2 | Columbus Crew | Columbus, Ohio |
| 7:30 PM EDT | Talley (yellow card) 16'; Kreis 59'; Goodson (yellow card) 79'; O'Brien (yellow card) 86'; Pareja (yellow card) 91+' | Report at the Wayback Machine (archived August 10, 2004); Boxscore from Soccer America at the Wayback Machine (archived August 16, 2004) | Buddle 38', 43' | Stadium: Columbus Crew Stadium; Attendance: 13,069; Referee: Roni Canales |

| August 7, 2004 19 | Colorado Rapids | 0–1 | Dallas Burn | Dallas, Texas |
| 6:00 PM CDT | Beckerman (yellow card) 27'; de la Torre (yellow card) 52' | Report at the Wayback Machine (archived October 11, 2004) | Davis (yellow card) 38' (yellow-red card) 72'; Valakari (yellow card) 44' (yellow-red card) 57'; Talley (yellow card) 62'; Johnson 91+' (pen.) | Stadium: Cotton Bowl; Attendance: 17,792; Referee: Ricardo Valenzuela; Assistant referees: Fabio Tovar; Kenneth Kaplan; Fourth official: Troy Travis |

| August 11, 2004 20 | New England Revolution | 3–0 | Dallas Burn | Dallas, Texas |
| 7:00 PM CDT | Noonan 3'; Twellman 87'; Dorman 94+' | Report at the Wayback Machine (archived October 11, 2004) | Goodson (yellow card) 91+' | Stadium: Cotton Bowl; Attendance: 5,104; Referee: Michael Kennedy; Assistant referees: Paul Scott; Jose Corro; Fourth official: Jair Marrufo |

| August 15, 2004 21 | Dallas Burn | 1–0 | MetroStars | East Rutherford, New Jersey |
| 6:00 PM EDT | Davis (yellow card) 64'; Gbandi (yellow card) 69'; Nhleko 91+' | Report at the Wayback Machine (archived August 16, 2004) | Arena (yellow card) 72'; Magee (yellow card) 83'; Bonseu (yellow card) 86'; Gaven (yellow card) 92+' | Stadium: Giants Stadium; Attendance: 11,913; Referee: Andrew Chapin; Assistant referees: Thomas Supple; Bahij Salman; Fourth official: Ken Heller |

| August 21, 2004 22 | Dallas Burn | 0–3 | San Jose Earthquakes | Spartan Stadium |
| 7:00 PM PDT | Kreis (yellow card) 42'; Rhine (yellow card) 62'; Gbandi (yellow card) 73'; Jolley (yellow card) 91+' | Report at the Wayback Machine (archived August 22, 2004) | Corrales 5' (yellow card) 38'; Gibbs 24' (o.g.); Cochrane (yellow card) 35' (yellow-red card) 88'; Ching 52' | Attendance: 10,020; Referee: Ali Saheli; Assistant referees: Greg Barkey; David Bragg; Fourth official: Yader Reyes |

| August 28, 2004 23 Brimstone Cup | Chicago Fire | 1–4 | Dallas Burn | Dallas, Texas |
| 7:30 PM CDT | Marsch (yellow card) 18'; Jaqua 49' | Report at the Wayback Machine (archived August 29, 2004) | Gibbs (yellow card) 21'; O'Brien 28'; Pareja (yellow card) 30'; Johnson 33', 65'; Nhleko 58' | Stadium: Cotton Bowl; Attendance: 7,744; Referee: Ricardo Valenzuela; Assistant referees: Craig Lowry; Bill Dittmar; Fourth official: Kevin Terry |

| September 4, 2004 24 | Dallas Burn | 1–2 | Colorado Rapids | Denver, Colorado |
| 7:00 PM MDT | Behncke 43'; Rhine (yellow card) 72' | Report at the Wayback Machine (archived September 5, 2004) | Spencer 52'; Borchers 85' | Stadium: Invesco Field at Mile High; Attendance: 8,931; Referee: Terry Vaughn; Assistant referees: Nathan Clement; Steven Taylor; Fourth official: Scott McCaslin |

| September 11, 2004 25 | Dallas Burn | 0–3 | D.C. United | Washington, D.C. |
| 4:00 PM EDT | Valakari (yellow card) 25'; Pareja (red card) 46+'; Reyes (yellow card) 80' | Report at the Wayback Machine (archived October 11, 2004) | Petke (yellow card) 2'; Eskandarian (yellow card) 40' (goal) 46+', 82'; Moreno (yellow card) 43'; Adu 84' | Stadium: RFK Stadium; Attendance: 13,024; Referee: Ricardo Salazar; Assistant referees: Kermit Quisenberry; Chip Reed; Fourth official: Roni Canales |

| September 18, 2004 26 | Los Angeles Galaxy | 0–2 | Dallas Burn | Dallas, Texas |
| 7:30 PM CDT | Marshall (yellow card) 20'; Albright (yellow card) 48+' | Report at the Wayback Machine (archived September 23, 2004) | Johnson 10', 44'; Reyes (yellow card) 40' | Stadium: Cotton Bowl; Attendance: 9,289; Referee: Abiodun Okulaja; Assistant referees: Nathan Clement; Robert Fereday; Fourth official: Richard Heron |

| September 25, 2004 27 | MetroStars | 2–0 | Dallas Burn | Dallas, Texas |
| 7:30 PM CDT | Wolyniec 30'; Leitch (yellow card) 63'; Glen (yellow card) 75' (goal) 92+' | Report at the Wayback Machine (archived October 10, 2004) | | Stadium: Cotton Bowl; Attendance: 7,214; Referee: Terry Vaughn; Assistant referees: Chris Strickland; Steven Taylor; Fourth official: Hilario Grajeda |

| October 2, 2004 28 | Dallas Burn | 0–2 | New England Revolution | Foxborough, Massachusetts |
| 7:30 PM EDT | Twellman 42'; Leonard (yellow card) 47+'; Ralston 47' | Report at the Wayback Machine (archived October 11, 2004) | Quill (yellow card) 12'; O'Brien (yellow card) 37'; Talley (yellow card) 90'; Gibbs (yellow card) 92+' | Stadium: Gillette Stadium; Attendance: 10,141; Referee: Alex Prus; Assistant referees: Craig Lowry; Bill Dittmar; Fourth official: Niko Bratsis |

| October 9, 2004 29 | Dallas Burn | 0–2 | Los Angeles Galaxy | Carson, California |
| 7:00 PM PDT | Reyes (yellow card) 32' | Report at the Wayback Machine (archived December 7, 2004) | Albright (yellow card) 34'; Kirovski 68', 85' | Stadium: The Home Depot Center; Attendance: 27,000; Referee: Jair Marrufo; Assistant referees: George Gansner; David Bragg; Fourth official: Baldomero Toledo |

| October 16, 2004 30 | San Jose Earthquakes | 2–2 | Dallas Burn | Dallas, Texas |
| 7:30 PM CDT | Ching 34'; Corrales 36'; Donovan (yellow card) 61'; De Rosario (yellow card) 93+' | Report at the Wayback Machine (archived December 7, 2004) | Johnson 12' (yellow card) 81'; Pareja (yellow card) 23' (goal) 62'; Gibbs (yellow card) 89' | Stadium: Cotton Bowl; Attendance: 10,268; Referee: Terry Vaughn; Assistant referees: Robert Fereday; Fabio Tovar; Fourth official: Ricardo Salazar |

== U.S. Open Cup ==
| June 30, 2004 Third Round | Virginia Beach Mariners | 0–2 | (Texas) Dallas Burn | Duncanville, Texas |
| 7:30 PM CDT | Danbusky (yellow card) 26'; Bilyk (yellow card) 61' | Report at the Wayback Machine (archived July 20, 2004) | Nhleko 20'; O'Brien 23'; Valakari (yellow card) 51'; Reyes (yellow card) 54' (yellow-red card) 74'; Thompson (yellow card) 79' | Stadium: Old Panther Field; Referee: Kevin Terry; Assistant referees: Adam Garner; Troy Travis; Fourth official: Kyle Borne |

| July 20, 2004 Fourth Round | Colorado Rapids | 0–3 | (Texas) Dallas Burn | Dallas, Texas |
| 7:00 PM CDT | Crawford (yellow card) 35'; Borchers (red card) 81'; Martinez (yellow card) 83' | Report at the Wayback Machine (archived August 10, 2004) | O'Brien 60'; Johnson 67', 75' | Stadium: Cotton Bowl; Referee: Marcel Yonan; Assistant referees: Kermit Quisenberry; Gary Owen; Fourth official: Adam Garner |

| August 4, 2004 Quarterfinal | Dallas Burn (Texas) | 0–4 | (Missouri) Kansas City Wizards | Overland Park, Kansas |
| 7:30 PM CDT | Salyer (yellow card) 23'; Gibbs (yellow card) 66' | Report at the Wayback Machine (archived August 9, 2004) | Klein 52'; Arnaud 57'; Detter 73'; Zotinca 88' (yellow card) 88' | Stadium: Blue Valley Sports Complex; Attendance: 2,143; Referee: Terry Vaughn; Assistant referees: Kermit Quisenberry; Emiliano Monje; Fourth official: Shane Butler |
