= 2005 FC Dallas season =

FC Dallas
2005 season
- Owner: Lamar Hunt
- Head coach: Colin Clarke
- Stadium: Cotton Bowl (April – July); Pizza Hut Park (August – October)
- MLS: Conference: 2nd Overall: 5th
- MLS Cup: Lost Western Conference Semifinals vs Colorado Rapids (0–1 – 1)
- U.S. Open Cup: Lost Championship Game vs. Los Angeles Galaxy (0–1)
- Brimstone Cup: Won Championship vs. Chicago Fire (2–1)
- Average home league attendance: 11,189
Home colors	Away colors

The 2005 FC Dallas season was the ninth season of the Major League Soccer team. The season saw many changes from the previous season. In August, the team moved from their longtime home of the Cotton Bowl to the new soccer-specific Pizza Hut Park in Frisco. Coinciding with the move, the team was rebranded as FC Dallas. This included changing the jerseys from predominantly red to white with red stripes and changing the color scheme from red and black to red, white, and blue. The team also changed its logo. Overall, the season was deemed a success by some because the team returned to the playoffs for the first time in three years. The team also reached the Championship Game of the U.S. Open Cup.

== Final standings ==
Pos	Team	Pld	W	L	T	GF	GA	GD	Pts	Qualification
1	San Jose Earthquakes	32	18	4	10	53	31	+22	64	MLS Cup Playoffs
2	FC Dallas	32	13	10	9	52	44	+8	48	MLS Cup Playoffs
3	Colorado Rapids	32	13	13	6	40	37	+3	45	MLS Cup Playoffs
4	Los Angeles Galaxy	32	13	13	6	44	45	−1	45	MLS Cup Playoffs
5	Real Salt Lake	32	5	22	5	30	65	−35	20	
6	Chivas USA	32	4	22	6	31	67	−36	18	

Source: MLS

== Regular season ==
April 2, 2005 1	Chicago Fire	1–2	FC Dallas	Dallas, Texas
7:30 PM CST	Griffin (yellow card) 21' (yellow-red card) 51'; Gray 73'	FC Dallas	Mulrooney 2' (yellow card) 80'; Johnson 47'; Talley (yellow card) 60'; Garlick (yellow card) 90'	Stadium: Cotton Bowl; Attendance: 10,504; Referee: Ricardo Valenzuela; Assistant referees: Kermit Quisenberry; Fabio Tovar; Fourth official: Michael Brow

April 9, 2005 2	FC Dallas	0–0	Colorado Rapids	Denver, Colorado
7:00 PM MDT	Pareja (yellow card) 27'; Talley (yellow card) 64'	FC Dallas	Nkong (yellow card) 15'; Melamed (yellow card) 83'	Stadium: Invesco Field at Mile High; Attendance: 9,253; Referee: Baldomero Toledo; Assistant referees: Paul Scott; Carey E. Rockwell; Fourth official: Scott McCaslin

April 16, 2005 3	FC Dallas	3–1	Chivas USA	Carson, California
7:00 PM PDT	O'Brien 40' (yellow card) 66'; Ruiz 85' (pen.); Johnson 94+'	FC Dallas	Ochoa (yellow card) 5'; Martins 44'; Suarez (yellow card) 78'; Hendrickson (yellow card) 90'	Stadium: The Home Depot Center; Attendance: 12,697; Referee: Ricardo Valenzuela; Assistant referees: Steven Davidson; Fabio Tovar; Fourth official: Baldomero Toledo

April 23, 2005 4	Real Salt Lake	0–3	FC Dallas	Dallas, Texas
7:00 PM CDT	Pope (red card) 73'	FC Dallas	Mulrooney 4'; Johnson 35'; Valakari (yellow card) 55'; Ruiz 63' (pen.)	Stadium: Cotton Bowl; Attendance: 9,134; Referee: Hilario Grajeda; Assistant referees: George Vergara; Emiliano Monje; Fourth official: Ben Jones

April 30, 2005 5	FC Dallas	0–2	Los Angeles Galaxy	Carson, California
7:00 PM PDT	Vanney (yellow card) 37'; Goodson (yellow card) 79'	FC Dallas	Donovan 9' (yellow card) 79'; Vagenas 39'; Nagamura (yellow card) 48'; Marshall (yellow card) 68'	Stadium: The Home Depot Center; Attendance: 20,021; Referee: Terry Vaughn; Assistant referees: George Gansner; Fabio Tovar; Fourth official: Baldomero Toledo

May 7, 2005 6	FC Dallas	3–3	Kansas City Wizards	Kansas City, Missouri
7:00 PM CDT	Johnson 16'; O'Brien (yellow card) 26' (goal) 77'; Ruiz 82' (yellow card) 90'	FC Dallas	Victorine 4'; Wolff 51' (pen.); Klein 53'; Stephenson (yellow card) 75'	Stadium: Arrowhead Stadium; Attendance: 10,007; Referee: Abiodun Okulaja; Assistant referees: Kermit Quisenberry; Kenneth Kaplan; Fourth official: Michael Kennedy

May 14, 2005 7	FC Dallas	0–0	San Jose Earthquakes	San Jose, California
7:00 PM PDT	Pareja (yellow card) 64'; O'Brien (yellow card) 76'	FC Dallas	Mullan (yellow card) 58'; Davis (yellow card) 66'	Stadium: Spartan Stadium; Attendance: 11,067; Referee: Erich Simmons; Assistant referees: Emiliano Monje; Jose Corro; Fourth official: Kevin Stott

May 18, 2005 8	Colorado Rapids	1–2	FC Dallas	Dallas, Texas
7:30 PM CDT	Peguero 12'; Kotschau (yellow card) 46'; Denton (yellow card) 73'	FC Dallas	Pitchkolan (yellow card) 48+'; O'Brien 61'; Ruiz 77'	Stadium: Cotton Bowl; Attendance: 6,112; Referee: Mark Geiger; Assistant referees: Chris Strickland; David Bragg; Fourth official: Kevin Terry

May 22, 2005 9	FC Dallas	5–2	Chivas USA	Carson, California
4:30 PDT	Pitchkolan 1'; Goodson (yellow card) 15'; Gbandi (yellow card) 31'; Ruiz 48'; O'Brien 51'; Johnson 69'; Mina 90+1'	FC Dallas	Cuadros 19' (pen.); Romo 53'	Stadium: The Home Depot Center; Attendance: 8,977; Referee: Alex Prus; Assistant referees: Robert Fereday; David Bragg; Fourth official: Ramon Hernandez

May 28, 2005 10	FC Dallas	2–0	D.C. United	Washington, D.C.
7:30 PM EDT	Goodson (yellow card) 26'; Álvarez (yellow card) 38'; Ruiz 49', 56' (pen.)	FC Dallas	Olsen (yellow card) 14'; Boswell (yellow card) 40'	Stadium: RFK Stadium; Attendance: 16,624; Referee: Ricardo Valenzuela; Assistant referees: Thomas Supple; Adam Wienckowski; Fourth official: Roni Canales

June 4, 2005 11	FC Dallas	2–0	Real Salt Lake	Salt Lake City, Utah
8:00 PM MDT	O'Brien 22'; Thompson 58'	FC Dallas	Besagno (yellow card) 35'	Stadium: Rice-Eccles Stadium; Attendance: 40,589; Referee: Baldomero Toledo; Assistant referees: George Vergara; Corey Rockwell; Fourth official: Chuck Locke

June 12, 2005 12	FC Dallas	0–2	Chicago Fire	Chicago, Illinois
6:00 PM CDT	O'Brien (yellow card) 45+2'; Valakari (yellow card) 76'; Vanney (yellow card) 90'	FC Dallas	Jaqua 20'; Mapp (yellow card) 13'; Marsch (yellow card) 45+3'; Reiter 90+1'	Stadium: Soldier Field; Attendance: 8,777; Referee: Ben Jones; Assistant referees: Craig Lowry; George Gansner; Fourth official: Abiodun Okulaja

June 18, 2005 13	Los Angeles Galaxy	0–1	FC Dallas	Dallas, Texas
7:30 PM CDT	Gomez (yellow card) 25'; Marshall (yellow card) 40'	FC Dallas	Álvarez (yellow card) 30'; Pitchkolan (yellow card) 32'; Mina 32'; Vanney (yellow card) 60'; Wagenfuhr (yellow card) 77'	Stadium: Cotton Bowl; Attendance: 11,044; Referee: Gus St. Silva; Assistant referees: Robert Fereday; Steven Taylor; Fourth official: Adam Garner

June 22, 2005 14	Chivas USA	1–2	FC Dallas	Dallas, Texas
7:30 PM CDT	Hendrickson (yellow card) 39'; Taylor 48'; Ramírez (yellow card) 64'	FC Dallas	Mina 18'; Pitchkolan (yellow card) 45+1'; Thompson 81'; Núñez (yellow card) 90+1'	Stadium: Cotton Bowl; Attendance: 8,672; Referee: Andrew Chapin; Assistant referees: Kermit Quisenberry; Paul Scott; Fourth official: Troy Travis

June 25, 2005 15	FC Dallas	3–1	Colorado Rapids	Denver, Colorado
7:00 PM MDT	Pitchkolan 13'; Rhine 85'; Thompson 88'	FC Dallas	Mastroeni (yellow card) 20'; Gonzalez 30'	Stadium: Invesco Field at Mile High; Attendance: 9,208; Referee: Kevin Stott; Assistant referees: Thomas Supple; Jose Corro; Fourth official: Scott McCaslin

July 2, 2005 16	San Jose Earthquakes	2–2	FC Dallas	Dallas, Texas
7:30 PM CDT	Mullan 6'; Califf (yellow card) 13' (yellow-red card) 35'; Clark 59'	FC Dallas	Álvarez 4'; Gbandi (yellow card) 38' (goal) 57'; O'Brien (yellow card) 39'; Rhine (yellow card) 75'; Valakari (yellow card) 88'	Stadium: Cotton Bowl; Attendance: 8,719; Referee: Alex Prus; Assistant referees: Fabio Tovar; Emiliano Monje; Fourth official: Kevin Terry

July 16, 2005 17	FC Dallas	2–3	New England Revolution	Foxborough, Massachusetts
7:30 PM EDT	Álvarez 7'; Valakari (yellow card) 35'; Pitchkolan (yellow card) 53'; O'Brien 45+1'	FC Dallas	Leonard (yellow card) 20'; Twellman 44', 90', 90+2'; Parkhurst (yellow card) 70'	Stadium: Gillette Stadium; Attendance: 22,108; Referee: Abiodun Okulaja; Assistant referees: George Vergara; Adam Wienckowski; Fourth official: Erich Simmons

July 23, 2005 18	FC Dallas	0–3	Real Salt Lake	Salt Lake City, Utah
7:30 PM MDT	Gbandi (yellow card) 24'; Goodson (yellow card) 44'; Pareja (yellow card) 52'; Mina (yellow card) 70'	FC Dallas	Dunseth 3'; Trembly (yellow card) 9'; Cila 25'; Mathis 30'; Cutler (yellow card) 31'; Countess (yellow card) 79'	Stadium: Rice-Eccles Stadium; Attendance: 20,218; Referee: Erich Simmons; Assistant referees: Craig Lowry; Anthony Vasoli; Fourth official: Michael Kennedy

July 27, 2005 19	FC Dallas	2–3	MetroStars	East Rutherford, New Jersey
7:30 PM EDT	Goodson 38', 47'	FC Dallas	Razov 7'; Magee 68'; Galván Rey 74' (yellow card) 90+2'	Stadium: Giants Stadium; Attendance: 7,776; Referee: Abiodun Okulaja; Assistant referees: Greg Barkey; Jorge De la Bandera; Fourth official: Jorge Gonzalez

August 6, 2005 20	MetroStars	2–2	FC Dallas	Frisco, Texas
7:30 PM CDT	Djorkaeff 47', 53'	FC Dallas	Ruiz 31', 34' (yellow card) 47'; Vanney (yellow card) 79'	Stadium: Pizza Hut Park; Attendance: 16,750; Referee: Brian Hall; Assistant referees: George Gansner; Fabio Tovar; Fourth official: Adam Garner

August 13, 2005 21	New England Revolution	2–1	FC Dallas	Frisco, Texas
7:30 PM CDT	Dempsey 33'; Twellman (yellow card) 61'; Joseph 80'; Smith (yellow card) 90'	FC Dallas	O'Brien (yellow card) 31'; Valakari (yellow card) 39'; Ruiz 58'	Stadium: Pizza Hut Park; Attendance: 12,101; Referee: Baldomero Toledo; Assistant referees: Chris Strickland; Paul Scott; Fourth official: Adam Garner

August 20, 2005 22	FC Dallas	0–1	Columbus Crew	Columbus, Ohio
4:00 PM EDT	Gbandi (yellow card) 65'	FC Dallas	Glen 81' (yellow card) 81'	Stadium: Columbus Crew Stadium; Attendance: 15,525; Referee: Kevin Stott; Assistant referees: Nathan Clement; Bill Dittmar; Fourth official: Mikael Lundqvist

August 27, 2005 23	Chivas USA	2–2	FC Dallas	Frisco, Texas
7:30 PM CDT	Arias 37'; Hendrickson 59'; Sequeira (yellow card) 82'	FC Dallas	Goodson (yellow card) 39'; Ruiz 44'; Núñez 67'; Gbandi (yellow card) 69'; Johnson (yellow card) 82'	Stadium: Pizza Hut Park; Attendance: 14,102; Referee: Terry Vaughn; Assistant referees: George Vergara; Corey Rockwell; Fourth official: Adam Garner

September 3, 2005 24	San Jose Earthquakes	2–0	FC Dallas	Frisco, Texas
7:30 PM CDT	Cerritos 50'; Moreno 53'	San Jose Earthquakes	Valakari (yellow card) 22'; Rhine (yellow card) 56'; Wilson (yellow card) 76'; Jolley (yellow card) 82'	Stadium: Pizza Hut Park; Attendance: 8,023; Referee: Erich Simmons; Assistant referees: Kermit Quisenberry; Emiliano Monje; Fourth official: Adam Garner

September 10, 2005 25	D.C. United	2–1	FC Dallas	Frisco, Texas
7:30 PM CDT	Erpen 15' (yellow card) 26'; Wilson (yellow card) 33'; Gómez (yellow card) 59'; Quaranta 72'	FC Dallas	O'Brien (yellow card) 12'; Wilson (yellow card) 16'; Goodson (yellow card) 66'; Núñez 87'	Stadium: Pizza Hut Park; Attendance: 15,263; Referee: Mark Geiger; Assistant referees: Thomas Supple; C.J. Morgante; Fourth official: Hilario Grajeda

September 18, 2005 26	Real Salt Lake	1–2	FC Dallas	Frisco, Texas
1:00 PM CDT	Mina 17', 52' (yellow card) 61'; Cabrera (yellow card) 59'	FC Dallas	Trembly (yellow card) 9'; Cutler (yellow card) 37'; Watson 54'	Stadium: Pizza Hut Park; Attendance: 11,681; Referee: Jair Marrufo; Assistant referees: Paul Scott; Jose Corro; Fourth official: Richard Heron

September 21, 2005 27	Los Angeles Galaxy	1–4	FC Dallas	Frisco, Texas
7:30 PM CDT	Rhine 86' (o.g.)	Los Angeles Galaxy	Rhine (yellow card) 32'; Roberts 34' (o.g.); Mina 37', 45'; Valakari (yellow card) 47'; Thompson 90'; Goodson (yellow card) 90+2'	Stadium: Pizza Hut Park; Attendance: 8,923; Referee: Ricardo Salazar; Assistant referees: George Vergara; David Bragg; Fourth official: Adam Garner

September 24, 2005 28	FC Dallas	1–1	San Jose Earthquakes	San Jose, California
7:00 PM PDT	Valakari (yellow card) 30'; Yi (yellow card) 54'; Núñez 58' (pen.); Talley (red card) 61'; Gbandi (yellow card) 88'	San Jose Earthquakes	Robinson (yellow card) 28' (yellow-red card) 60'; Ching 68'	Stadium: Spartan Stadium; Attendance: 17,414; Referee: Mark Geiger; Assistant referees: George Gansner; Corey Rockwell; Fourth official: Ricardo Valenzuela

October 1, 2005 29	FC Dallas	1–2	Los Angeles Galaxy	Carson, California
7:00 PM PDT	Goodson (yellow card) 13'; Pitchkolan 42'; Vanney (red card) 50'; Rhine (yellow card) 69'	FC Dallas	Gomez 12', 45+1' (yellow card) 29'; Albright (yellow card) 41'	Stadium: The Home Depot Center; Attendance: 25,557; Referee: Terry Vaughn; Assistant referees: Jose Corro; Fabio Tovar; Fourth official: Ramon Hernandez

October 5, 2005 30	Columbus Crew	1–2	FC Dallas	Frisco, Texas
7:30 PM CDT	Testo 17'; Glen (yellow card) 63'	FC Dallas	Gbandi (yellow card) 33'; Rhine 58'; O'Brien (yellow card) 62'; Núñez 90+2'	Stadium: Pizza Hut Park; Attendance: 6,961; Referee: Gus St. Silva; Assistant referees: George Vergara; Paul Scott; Fourth official: Kevin Terry

October 8, 2005 31	Colorado Rapids	0–0	FC Dallas	Frisco, Texas
7:30 PM CDT	Kotschau (yellow card) 65'	FC Dallas		Stadium: Pizza Hut Park; Attendance: 13,011; Referee: Ricardo Valenzuela; Assistant referees: Greg Barkey; Bill Dittmar; Fourth official: Adam Garner

October 15, 2005 32	Kansas City Wizards	2–2	FC Dallas	Frisco, Texas
7:30 PM CDT	Burciaga (yellow card) 55'; Arnaud 77'; Preki 90'	FC Dallas	Pareja 69'; Núñez 75'	Stadium: Pizza Hut Park; Attendance: 18,021; Referee: Brian Hall; Assistant referees: Jose Corro; Corey Rockwell; Fourth official: Troy Travis

== Playoffs ==
=== Western Conference semifinals ===
October 22, 2005 Game 1	FC Dallas	0–0	Colorado Rapids	Denver, Colorado
7:00 PM MDT	Jolley (yellow card) 65'; O'Brien (yellow card) 74'	FC Dallas; Colorado Rapids	Beckerman (yellow card) 29'	Stadium: Invesco Field at Mile High; Attendance: 9,625; Referee: Michael Kennedy; Assistant referees: Chris Strickland; Fabio Tovar; Fourth official: Alex Prus

October 29, 2005 Game 2	Colorado Rapids	2–2 (SO) (2–2 agg.) (5–4 p)	FC Dallas	Frisco, Texas
7:30 PM CDT	Cunningham 19'; Mastroeni (yellow card) 48'; Nkong (red card) 58'; Denton (yellow card) 68'; Cannon (yellow card) 90+1'; Kirovski (yellow card) 92'; Kotschau 106'	Colorado Rapids	Rhine (yellow card) 57'; Valakari (yellow card) 63'; Ruiz 67', 105'; Gbandi (yellow card) 90+2'	Stadium: Pizza Hut Park; Attendance: 10,104; Referee: Terry Vaughn; Assistant referees: George Gansner; Steven Taylor; Fourth official: Baldomero Toledo
	Penalties
	Mastroeni (penalty scored); Kirovski (penalty scored); Cunningham (penalty scored); Cooke (penalty scored); Philippe (penalty scored)		(penalty scored) Ruíz; (penalty scored) Núñez; (penalty scored) Pareja; (penalty scored) Vanney; (penalty missed) Miña

== U.S. Open Cup ==
July 13, 2005 Third Round	Wilmington Hammerheads (North Carolina)	1–3 (OT)	(Texas) FC Dallas	Richardson, Texas
	Popovich 18' (yellow card) 45'	FC Dallas	Thompson 35'; Pitchkolan (yellow card) 56'; Talley 98'; Álvarez (yellow card) 104'; Rhine (yellow card) 107'; Mina 112'	Stadium: UT-Dallas soccer fields Referee: Jair Marrufo; Assistant referees: Ibrehim Nagim; Troy Travis; Fourth official: Fernando Galvon

August 3, 2005 Fourth Round	FC Dallas (Texas)	3–1 (OT)	(Ohio) Columbus Crew	Columbus, Ohio
	Rhine (yellow card) 20'; Talley 29' (yellow card) 89'; Moor (yellow card) 36'; Pitchkolan (yellow card) 56'; Thompson 113'; Johnson (yellow card) 106+' (goal) 116'	FC Dallas	Martino 36'; Vasquez (yellow card) 41'; Szetela (red card) 100'; Hejduk (red card) 103'	Stadium: Jesse Owens Memorial Stadium; Referee: Ricardo Salazar; Assistant referees: Steven Taylor; Richard Eddy; Fourth official: Hilario Grajeda

August 24, 2005 Quarterfinal	FC Dallas (Texas)	1–1 (SO) (4–1 p)	(Washington, D.C.) D.C. United	Germantown, Maryland
	Goodson (yellow card) 10'; Talley (yellow card) 73'; Ruiz 90+4'; Vanney (yellow card) 91'	FC Dallas	Walker (yellow card) 27'; Gomez 47'; Kovalenko (yellow card) 53' (yellow-red card) 72'; Olsen (yellow card) 106'; Wilson (yellow card) 119'	Stadium: Maryland SoccerPlex; Attendance: 4,258; Referee: Abiodun Okulaja; Assistant referees: Kermit Quisenberry; Richard Eddy; Fourth official: Andrew Chapin
	Penalties
	Ruiz (penalty scored); Vanney (penalty scored); Rhine (penalty scored); Thompson (penalty scored)		Adu (penalty scored); Wilson (penalty missed); Gros (penalty missed)

September 14, 2005 Semifinal	Chicago Fire (Illinois)	0–1	(Texas) FC Dallas	Frisco, Texas
	Marsch (yellow card) 17'; Segares (yellow card) 21' (yellow-red card) 90'; Caballero (yellow card) 44'	Soccer America; Chicago Fire	O'Brien 20'; Valakari (yellow card) 16' (yellow-red card) 55'	Stadium: Pizza Hut Park; Attendance: 7,311; Referee: Baldomero Toledo; Assistant referees: Robert Fereday; Fabio Tovar; Fourth official: Adam Garner

September 28, 2005 Final	FC Dallas (Texas)	0–1	(California) Los Angeles Galaxy	Carson, California
	Rhine (yellow card) 9'; Goodson (yellow card) 59'; Wilson (yellow card) 59'	Soccer America; TheCup.us; FC Dallas	Gomez 25'; Ngwenya (yellow card) 59'; Gomez (yellow card) 60'	Stadium: The Home Depot Center; Attendance: 10,000; Referee: Alex Prus; Assistant referees: Nathan Clement; Kermit Quisenberry; Fourth official: Baldomero Toledo
