= David Wagenfuhr =

American soccer player (born 1982)

Personal information
- Full name: David Wagenfuhr
- Date of birth: June 22, 1982 (age 44)
- Place of birth: Colorado Springs, Colorado, U.S.
- Height: 6 ft 1 in (1.85 m)
- Position: Defender

College career
Years	Team	Apps	(Gls)
2000–2003	Creighton Bluejays		

Senior career*
Years	Team	Apps	(Gls)
2003	Boulder Rapids Reserve	14	(2)
2004–2008	FC Dallas	45	(1)
2004	→ Milwaukee Rampage (loan)	5	(0)
- * Club domestic league appearances and goals

David Wagenfuhr (born June 22, 1982) is an American former soccer player, who retired at the age of 26, due to injury.

Wagenfuhr played four years of college soccer for Creighton University, where he was a standout player, being named first team All-Missouri Valley Conference three times. He also played in the USL Premier Development League for Boulder Rapids Reserve.

Wagenfuhr was drafted 31st overall in the 2004 MLS SuperDraft by the Dallas Burn. Wagenfuhr saw no league playing time in his first year with the team. He became a starter in 2005. He scored his first career goal on July 8, 2006, against New York Red Bulls.

He retired from soccer in December 2008.

== Career statistics ==
Club performance			League		Open Cup		League Cup		North America		Total	
Club	Season	Division	Apps	Goals	Apps	Goals	Apps	Goals	Apps	Goals	Apps	Goals
Dallas	2004	MLS	0	0								
Dallas	2005	MLS	19	0								
Dallas	2006	MLS	13	1								
Dallas	2007	MLS	3	0								
Career total			35	1								
