= Arturo Álvarez (footballer, born 1985) =

Salvadoran footballer

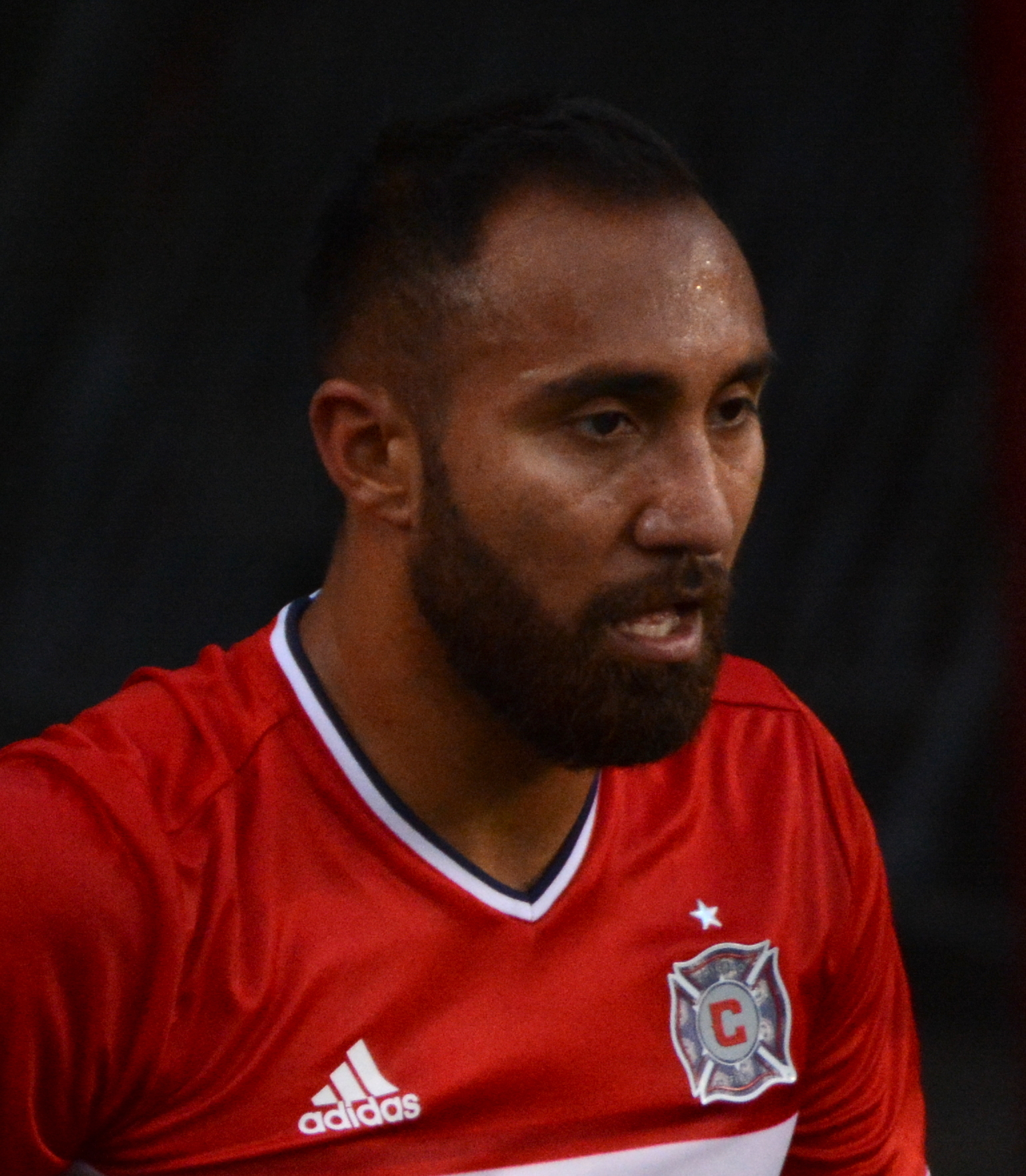
- Álvarez with Chicago Fire FC in 2017

Personal information
- Full name: José Arturo Álvarez Hernández
- Date of birth: June 28, 1985 (age 41)
- Place of birth: Houston, Texas, United States
- Height: 5 ft 9 in (1.75 m)
- Positions: Winger; forward

Senior career*
Years	Team	Apps	(Gls)
2003–2004	San Jose Earthquakes	26	(2)
2005–2008	FC Dallas	88	(11)
2008–2010	San Jose Earthquakes	54	(11)
2011	Real Salt Lake	20	(0)
2012–2013	Paços de Ferreira	13	(3)
2013	→ Videoton (loan)	11	(2)
2013–2015	Videoton	45	(6)
2016–2017	Chicago Fire	55	(8)
2018	Houston Dynamo	18	(0)
Total		330	(43)

International career
- United States U17
- United States U18
- United States U20
- United States U23
2009–2018	El Salvador	44	(4)
- * Club domestic league appearances and goals as of October 31, 2018 (UTC)

José Arturo Álvarez Hernández (born June 28, 1985) is a former professional footballer who played as a winger and forward. Born in the United States, he played for the El Salvador national team.

== Club career ==
Álvarez did not play college soccer; instead, he joined MLS in 2003, signing a Project-40 contract, and was selected thirteenth overall in the 2003 MLS SuperDraft by the San Jose Earthquakes. In his first year, Álvarez scored his first MLS goal on June 14, 2003, against FC Dallas but would go on to get limited playing time. However, in January 2005 Álvarez was traded by San Jose with Richard Mulrooney and the #6 and #29 picks in the 2005 MLS SuperDraft to FC Dallas in exchange for Brad Davis, cash, and the #4 pick in the 2005 SuperDraft.

During the 2007 MLS Cup Playoffs, in the second leg of FC Dallas' Conference semifinal match with the Houston Dynamo, Álvarez was sent off for "violent conduct" after he kneed Brad Davis in the groin while out of bounds in the forty-seventh minute. Dallas went on to lose the tie 4–1, and the match 4–2 on aggregate.

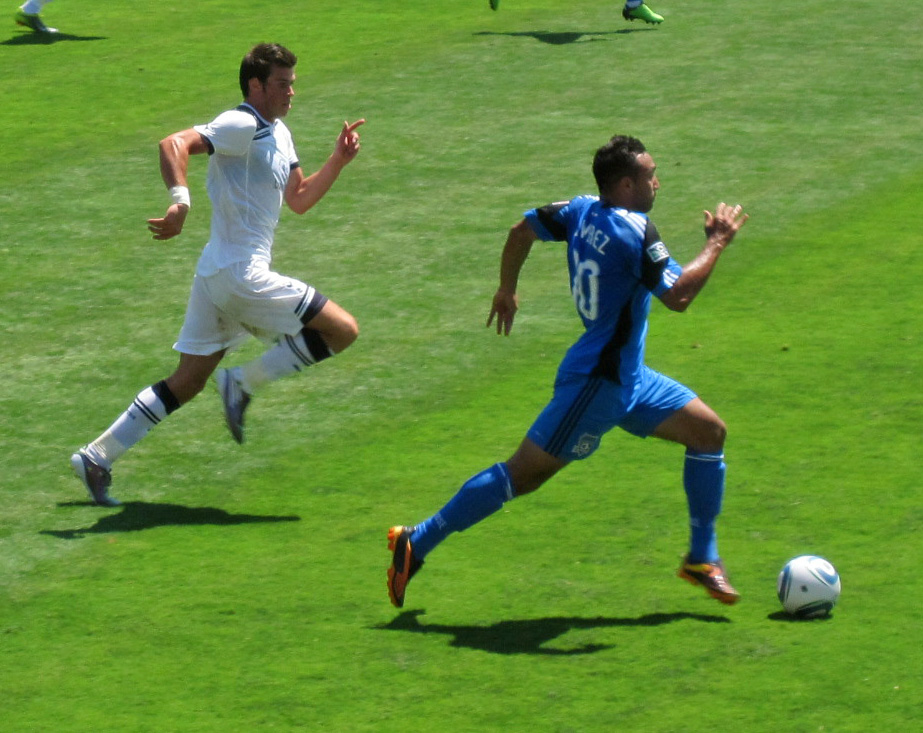
Álvarez evades Tottenham's Gareth Bale in a July 2010 friendly in San Jose, California.

Álvarez was traded to the new San Jose Earthquakes in July 2008 for allocation money and their first round draft pick in the 2009 MLS SuperDraft. In his debut, he scored the first goal of the match against the Los Angeles Galaxy in a match that ended 3–2. On November 24, 2010, Álvarez was selected in the tenth round of the 2010 MLS Expansion Draft by Portland Timbers but was immediately traded to Real Salt Lake for a 2nd round 2011 MLS SuperDraft pick.

The Salvadoran American made his debut with Real Salt Lake on March 15, 2011, when he entered in the 88th minuteof the first leg of the 2010–11 CONCACAF Champions League semifinals against Saprissa.

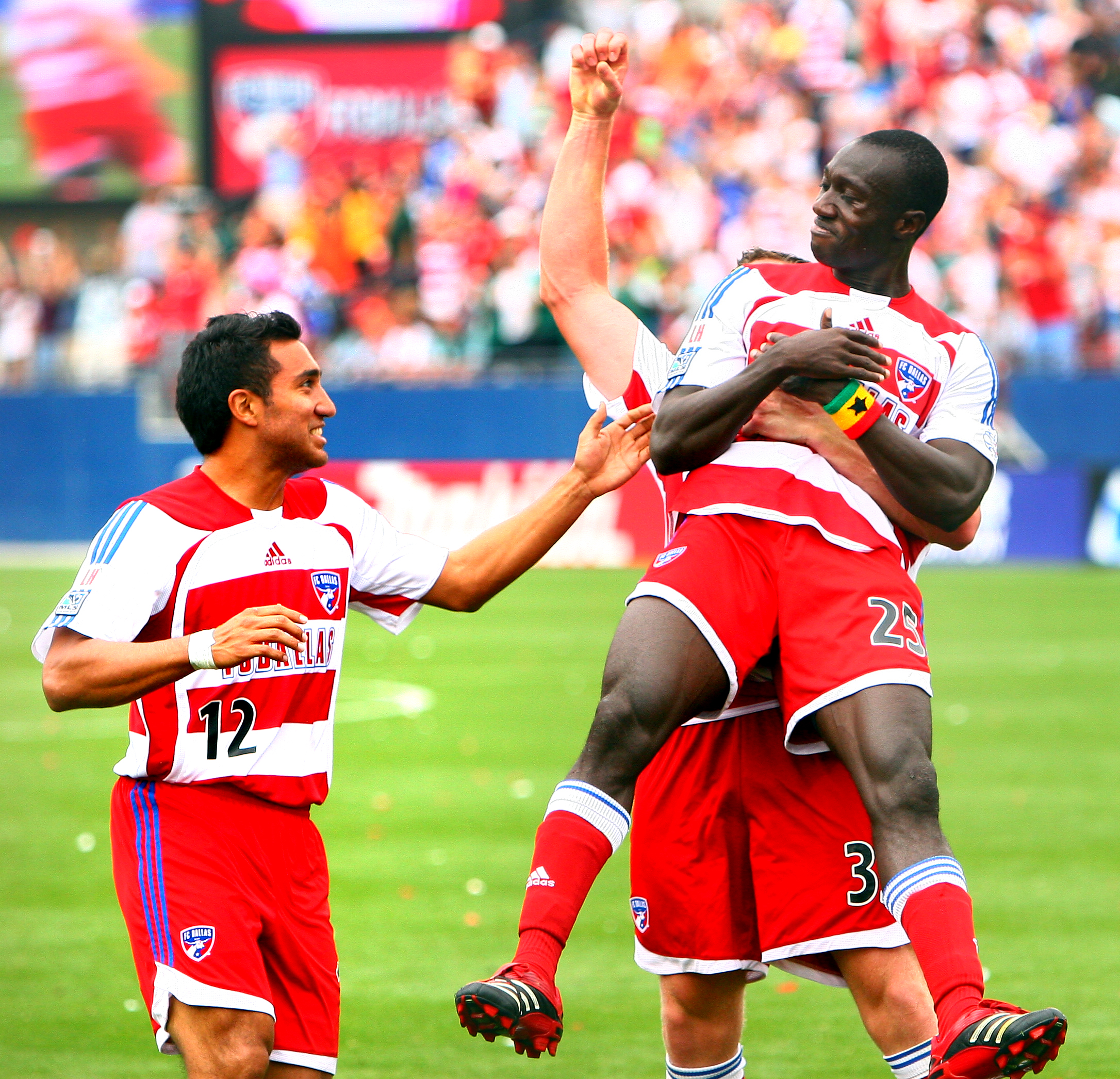
Álvarez (left) celebrating a goal playing with FC Dallas.

After the 2011 season, Real Salt Lake did not re-sign Álvarez. He opted to participate in the 2011 MLS Re-Entry Draft and was selected by Chivas USA on December 5, 2011. However, he instead signed a two-year contract with Portuguese first division club Paços de Ferreira. On March 18, 2012, he scored his first goal with his new team against Académica

On February 7, 2013, he was loaned to Hungarian club Videoton. He played well enough with the team that in June 2013 he signed a two-year contract to stay in Hungary. He was released in 2015.

On March 3, 2016, after a successful preseason trial with the club, Álvarez was signed by Chicago Fire to a one-year deal with one year option.

On December 10, 2017, Álvarez was traded by Chicago to his home town club, the Houston Dynamo, in exchange for a second-round selection in the 2019 MLS SuperDraft. Álvarez was mainly used as a sub and helped the Dynamo win the 2018 US Open Cup. He left the club again at the end of 2018.

On March 1, 2019, Álvarez announced his retirement from playing professional soccer.

== International career ==
=== United States ===
Álvarez represented the United States in various youth levels – U-17, U-18, and U-20. He also participated in various matches and training camps with the U-23 team.

=== El Salvador ===
Though Álvarez played on various United States national squads at the youth level, he was never called up to the senior national team. Being of Salvadoran descent, Álvarez was invited to play for the El Salvador national team by coach Carlos de los Cobos. On August 12, 2009, Álvarez made his debut for El Salvador in a World Cup qualifier against Trinidad and Tobago. On September 5, 2009, Álvarez started in a World Cup qualifier against his home country at Rio Tinto Stadium in Sandy, Utah. El Salvador fell, 2–1. On September 9, 2009, Álvarez played his first home game in Estadio Cuscatlán, in San Salvador, El Salvador against Costa Rica. El Salvador was victorious 1–0.

== Career statistics ==
=== Club ===
Appearances and goals by club, season and competition
Club	Season	League			National cup (Note: Includes appearances in US Open Cup, Taça de Portugal, Magyar Kupa)		League cup (Note: Includes appearances in MLS Cup playoffs, Taça da Liga, Ligakupa)		Continental		Total	
Club	Season	Division	Apps	Goals	Apps	Goals	Apps	Goals	Apps	Goals	Apps	Goals
San Jose Earthquakes	2003	MLS	15	1	0	0	0	0	—		15	1
San Jose Earthquakes	2004	MLS	11	1	0	0	0	0	—		11	1
San Jose Earthquakes	Total		26	2	0	0	0	0	0	0	26	2
FC Dallas	2005	MLS	24	2	0	0	0	0	—		24	2
FC Dallas	2006	MLS	19	3	0	0	0	0	—		19	3
FC Dallas	2007	MLS	27	3	0	0	2	0	3 (Note: Appearances in North American SuperLiga)	3	32	6
FC Dallas	2008	MLS	16	3	0	0	—		—		16	3
FC Dallas	Total		86	11	0	0	2	0	3	3	91	14
San Jose Earthquakes	2008	MLS	12	3	0	0	—		—		12	3
San Jose Earthquakes	2009	MLS	23	5	0	0	—		—		23	5
San Jose Earthquakes	2010	MLS	19	3	0	0	3	0	—		22	3
San Jose Earthquakes	Total		54	11	0	0	3	0	0	0	57	11
Real Salt Lake	2011	MLS	16	0	1	0	0	0	4 (Note: Appearances in CONCACAF Champions League)	0	21	0
F.C. Paços de Ferreira	2011–12	Primeira Liga	9	2	0	0	1	0	—		10	2
F.C. Paços de Ferreira	2012–13	Primeira Liga	4	1	2	1	2	1	—		8	3
F.C. Paços de Ferreira	Total		13	3	2	1	3	1	0	0	18	5
Videoton FC (loan)	2012–13	Nemzeti Bajnokság I	11	2	2	0	5	0	—		18	2
Videoton FC	2013–14	Nemzeti Bajnokság I	22	4	1	0	9	3	1 (Note: Appearances in Europa League)	0	33	7
Videoton FC	2014–15	Nemzeti Bajnokság I	23	2	3	1	3	2	—		29	5
Videoton FC	Total		56	8	6	1	17	5	1	0	80	14
Chicago Fire	2016	MLS	30	5	3	0	—		—		33	5
Chicago Fire	2017	MLS	25	3	2	0	1	0	—		28	3
Chicago Fire	Total		55	8	5	0	1	0	0	0	61	8
Houston Dynamo	2018	MLS	18	0	2	0	—		—		20	0
Total			324	43	16	2	26	6	8	3	374	54

=== International goals ===
#	Date	Venue	Opponent	Score	Result	Competitions
1	June 12, 2011	Soldier Field, Chicago, United States	Cuba	5 – 1	6 – 1	2011 CONCACAF Gold Cup
2	June 4, 2014	Toyota Stadium, Dallas, Texas, United States	Ivory Coast	1 – 2	1 – 2	Friendly
3	September 10, 2014	BBVA Compass Stadium, Houston, US	Belize	2 – 0	2 – 0	2014 Copa Centroamericana
4	June 16, 2015	Estadio Cuscatlán, San Salvador, El Salvador	Saint Kitts and Nevis	3 – 0	4 – 1	2018 FIFA World Cup Q

== Honors ==
San Jose Earthquakes

- MLS Cup: 2003

Videoton

- Nemzeti Bajnokság I: 2014–15

Houston Dynamo

- US Open Cup: 2018
