= 2008 San Jose Earthquakes season =

San Jose Earthquakes
2008 season
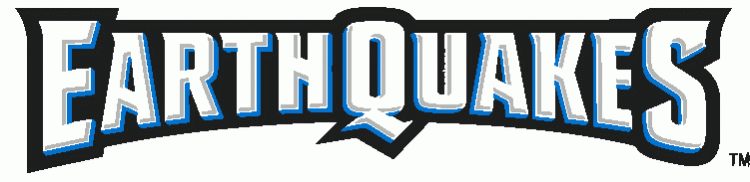
- Owner: Earthquakes Soccer, LLC
- Coach: Frank Yallop
- Stadium: Buck Shaw Stadium
- Major League Soccer: Conference: 7th Overall: 14th
- MLS Cup: Did not qualify
- U.S. Open Cup: Did not qualify
- California Clásico: 2nd
- Top goalscorer: Darren Huckerby (6)
- Average home league attendance: 13,755
Home colors	Away colors

The 2008 San Jose Earthquakes season was the eleventh season of the team's existence, and the first in their return to the league after a two-year hiatus.

== Squad ==
=== Current squad ===
As of August 18, 2009. Note: Flags indicate national team as defined under FIFA eligibility rules; some limited exceptions apply. Players may hold more than one non-FIFA nationality.

No.	Pos.	Nation	Player
1	GK	USA	Joe Cannon
2	DF	USA	Eric Denton
3	DF	USA	Nick Garcia (captain)
5	DF	USA	Ryan Cochrane
6	FW	ENG	Darren Huckerby
7	MF	EIR	Ronnie O'Brien
8	FW	LBR	Adam Smarte
9	FW	TCA	Gavin Glinton
10	MF	BRA	Francisco Lima
12	MF	USA	Ned Grabavoy
13	MF	USA	Ramiro Corrales
14	MF	USA	Matt Hatzke
15	MF	USA	Shea Salinas

No.	Pos.	Nation	Player
16	FW	ESP	Mikel Arce
17	FW	USA	Arturo Alvarez
18	DF	USA	Jamil Roberts
19	FW	JAM	Ryan Johnson
20	FW	ENG	John Cunliffe
21	DF	USA	Jason Hernandez (vice-captain)
22	DF	USA	Kelly Gray
23	FW	GER	Michael Ghebru
24	GK	USA	Michael Gustavson
27	DF	USA	Jay Ayres
32	FW	RSA	Davide Somma
33	FW	TRI	Scott Sealy

== Club ==
=== Management ===
Position	Staff
General Manager	(United States) John Doyle
Head Coach	(Canada) Frank Yallop
Assistant Coach	(United States) Ian Russell
Goalkeeper Coach	(New Zealand) Jason Batty
Head trainer	(United States) Bruce Morgan
Equipment manager	(El Salvador) Jose Vega

Last updated: April 18, 2009
Source: San Jose Earthquakes

=== Other information ===
Owner	(United States) Earthquakes Soccer, LLC
Ground (capacity and dimensions)	Buck Shaw Stadium (10,300 / 71x110 yards)

Source: San Jose Earthquakes

== Competitions ==
=== Overall ===
Competition	Started round	Current position / round	Final position / round	First match	Last match
2008 Major League Soccer season	—	—		April 3, 2008	October 25, 2008

Updated to match played November 17, 2012
Source: Competitions

=== Major League Soccer ===
Win Tie Loss

April 3, 2008	Los Angeles Galaxy	2–0	San Jose Earthquakes	Carson, California
	Beckham 9'; Donovan 37'	Report		Stadium: Home Depot Center; Attendance: 27,000

April 12, 2008	San Jose Earthquakes	0–1	Chicago Fire	Oakland, California
		Report	Barrett 19'	Stadium: Oakland Alameda Coliseum; Attendance: 20,038

April 19, 2008	Colorado Rapids	0–2	San Jose Earthquakes	Commerce City, Colorado
		Report	O'Brien 43'; Kamara 61'	Stadium: Dick's Sporting Goods Park; Attendance: 14,919

April 27, 2008	New York Red Bulls	2–0	San Jose Earthquakes	East Rutherford, New Jersey
	Magee 79'; Altidore 95'	Report		Stadium: Giants Stadium; Attendance: 9,053

May 3, 2008	San Jose Earthquakes	0–0	FC Dallas	Santa Clara, California
		Report		Stadium: Buck Shaw Stadium; Attendance: 10,515

May 10, 2008	San Jose Earthquakes	2–3	Columbus Crew	Santa Clara, California
	Corrales 42'; Johnson 89'	Report	Rogers 73'; Rogers 81'; Evans 83'	Stadium: Buck Shaw Stadium; Attendance: 9,318

May 17, 2008	New England Revolution	2–0	San Jose Earthquakes	Foxborough, Massachusetts
	Dube 6' own goal 23'	Report		Stadium: Gillette Stadium; Attendance: 13,004

May 22, 2008	San Jose Earthquakes	2–1	Houston Dynamo	Santa Clara, California USA
	Kamara 67'; Guerrero 81'	Report	Ching 88'	Stadium: Buck Shaw Stadium; Attendance: 10,046

May 31, 2008	Real Salt Lake	3–1	San Jose Earthquakes	Salt Lake City, Utah
	Findley 48'; Morales 60'; Kovalenko 73'	Report	Cunliffe 84'	Stadium: Rice-Eccles Stadium; Attendance: 15,977

June 7, 2008	Columbus Crew	0–2	San Jose Earthquakes	Columbus, Ohio
		Report	Johnson 10'; Corrales 60'	Stadium: Columbus Crew Stadium; Attendance: 11,704

June 14, 2008	San Jose Earthquakes	0–3	Los Angeles Galaxy	Oakland, California USA
		Report	Buddle 6' 63' 68'	Stadium: Oakland Alameda Coliseum; Attendance: 39,872

June 18, 2008	Real Salt Lake	0–0	San Jose Earthquakes	Salt Lake City
		Report		Stadium: Rice-Eccles Stadium; Attendance: 10,333

June 22, 2008	D.C. United	3–1	San Jose Earthquakes	Washington, D.C. USA
	Simms 50'; Martínez 55'; Emílio 88'	Report	Cunliffe 51'	Stadium: RFK Stadium; Attendance: 17,922

June 28, 2008	Chicago Fire	0–0	San Jose Earthquakes	Bridgeview, Illinois
		Report		Stadium: Toyota Park; Attendance: 15,276

July 5, 2008	Chivas USA	1–0	San Jose Earthquakes	Carson, California USA
	Razov 88'	Report		Stadium: Home Depot Center; Attendance: 13,561

July 12, 2008	San Jose Earthquakes	1–1	Colorado Rapids	Santa Clara, California
	Johnson 62'	Report	Casey 70'	Stadium: Buck Shaw Stadium; Attendance: 9,107

July 19, 2008	Toronto FC	0–0	San Jose Earthquakes	Toronto, Canada
		Report		Stadium: BMO Field; Attendance: 20,264

July 27, 2008	San Jose Earthquakes	1–1	New York Red Bulls	Santa Clara, California USA
	Huckerby 13'	Report	own goal 4'	Stadium: Buck Shaw Stadium; Attendance: 9,046

August 3, 2008	San Jose Earthquakes	3–2	Los Angeles Galaxy	Oakland, California USA
	Alvarez 8'; Huckerby 40'; Cochrane 90'	Report	Donovan 42'; Buddle 76'	Stadium: Oakland Alameda Coliseum; Attendance: 26,071

August 16, 2008	San Jose Earthquakes	4–0	New England Revolution	Santa Clara, California
	O'Brien 11' 87'; Johnson 71'; Sealy 76'	Report		Stadium: Buck Shaw Stadium; Attendance: 9,859

August 23, 2008	Chivas USA	0–0	San Jose Earthquakes	Carson, California
		Report		Stadium: Home Depot Center; Attendance: 12,209

August 30, 2008	San Jose Earthquakes	2–1	Kansas City Wizards	Santa Clara, California
	Alvarez 43'; Huckerby 83'	Report	Arnaud 64'	Stadium: Buck Shaw Stadium; Attendance: 10,089

September 6, 2008	San Jose Earthquakes	2–1	D.C. United	Santa Clara, California USA
	Alvarez 18'; Huckerby 62'	Report	Quaranta 76'	Stadium: Buck Shaw Stadium; Attendance: 10,121

September 13, 2008	San Jose Earthquakes	1–1	Houston Dynamo	Santa Clara, California USA
	O'Brien 50'	Report	Ching 71'	Stadium: Buck Shaw Stadium; Attendance: 10,526

September 27, 2008	San Jose Earthquakes	2–3	Real Salt Lake	Santa Clara, California USA
	Huckerby 23' 47'	Report	Movsisyan 3' 49'; Morales 59'	Stadium: Buck Shaw Stadium; Attendance: 10,059

October 2, 2008	FC Dallas	1–1	San Jose Earthquakes	Frisco, Texas
	Cooper 89'	Report	Johnson 58'	Stadium: Pizza Hut Park; Attendance: 7,173

October 11, 2008	San Jose Earthquakes	0–1	Chivas USA	Santa Clara, California
		Report	Braun 7'	Stadium: Buck Shaw Stadium; Attendance: 10,502

October 15, 2008	Houston Dynamo	2–1	San Jose Earthquakes	Houston, Texas
	Holden 6' 93'	Report	Sealy 68'	Stadium: Robertson Stadium; Attendance: 12,327

October 18, 2008	Kansas City Wizards	3–2	San Jose Earthquakes	Kansas City, Kansas USA
	López 18'; Arnaud 27'; Gomez 93'	Report	Sealy 20'; Salinas 71'	Stadium: CommunityAmerica Ballpark; Attendance: 9,841

October 25, 2008	San Jose Earthquakes	2–0	Toronto FC	Santa Clara, California
	Cochrane 49'; Salinas 91'	Report		Stadium: Buck Shaw Stadium; Attendance: 10,526

=== U.S. Open Cup qualification ===
April 30, 2008 Qualification first round	Real Salt Lake	4–0	San Jose Earthquakes
		Report

==== Standings ====
Pos	Team	Pld	W	L	T	GF	GA	GD	Pts	Qualification
1	Houston Dynamo	30	13	5	12	45	32	+13	51	MLS Cup Playoffs
2	Chivas USA	30	12	11	7	40	41	−1	43	MLS Cup Playoffs
3	Real Salt Lake	30	10	10	10	40	39	+1	40	MLS Cup Playoffs
4	Colorado Rapids	30	11	14	5	44	45	−1	38	
5	FC Dallas	30	8	10	12	45	41	+4	36	
6	LA Galaxy	30	8	13	9	55	62	−7	33	
7	San Jose Earthquakes	30	8	13	9	32	38	−6	33	

Source: MLS

Pos	Team	Pld	W	L	T	GF	GA	GD	Pts	Qualification
1	Columbus Crew (C, S)	30	17	7	6	50	36	+14	57	CONCACAF Champions League
2	Houston Dynamo	30	13	5	12	45	32	+13	51	CONCACAF Champions League
3	Chicago Fire	30	13	10	7	44	33	+11	46	North American SuperLiga
4	Chivas USA	30	12	11	7	40	41	−1	43	North American SuperLiga
5	New England Revolution	30	12	11	7	40	43	−3	43	North American SuperLiga
6	Kansas City Wizards	30	11	10	9	37	39	−2	42	North American SuperLiga
7	Real Salt Lake	30	10	10	10	40	39	+1	40	
8	New York Red Bulls	30	10	11	9	42	48	−6	39	CONCACAF Champions League
9	Colorado Rapids	30	11	14	5	44	45	−1	38	
10	D.C. United	30	11	15	4	43	51	−8	37	CONCACAF Champions League
11	FC Dallas	30	8	10	12	45	41	+4	36	
12	Toronto FC	30	9	13	8	34	43	−9	35	CONCACAF Champions League (Note: As winners of the 2009 Canadian Championship)
13	LA Galaxy	30	8	13	9	55	62	−7	33	
14	San Jose Earthquakes	30	8	13	9	32	38	−6	33	

Source: MLS
Rules for classification: 1) points; 2) head-to-head record; 3) goal difference; 4) number of goals scored
(C) Champions; (S) Supporters' Shield
