= Wagenfuhr =

Wagenfuhr is a surname. Notable people with the surname include:

- David Wagenfuhr (born 1982), American soccer player
