= Drew Moor =

American soccer player (born 1984)

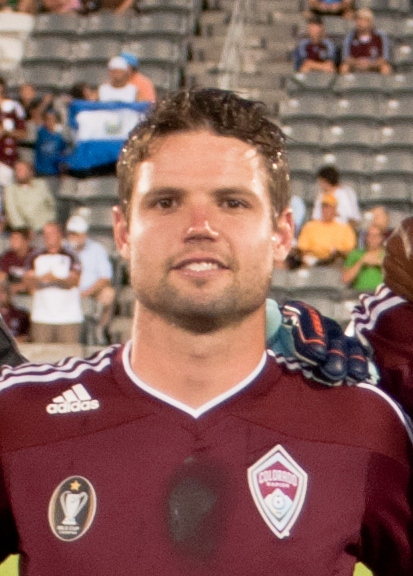
- Moor with Colorado Rapids in 2011

Personal information
- Date of birth: January 15, 1984 (age 42)
- Place of birth: Dallas, Texas, United States
- Height: 6 ft 0 in (1.83 m)
- Position: Center-back

Youth career
- 1999–2002: ESD Eagles

College career
Years	Team	Apps	(Gls)
2002	Furman Paladins	23	(1)
2003–2004	Indiana Hoosiers	42	(4)

Senior career*
Years	Team	Apps	(Gls)
2004	Chicago Fire Premier	10	(3)
2005–2009	FC Dallas	123	(8)
2009–2015	Colorado Rapids	181	(14)
2016–2019	Toronto FC	78	(5)
2020–2022	Colorado Rapids	29	(1)
2022	Colorado Rapids 2	1	(0)
Total		422	(31)

International career
2003	United States U20	4	(0)
2007–2008	United States	5	(0)
- * Club domestic league appearances and goals

Drew Moor (born January 15, 1984) is an American former professional soccer player who played as a center-back in Major League Soccer.

Born in Dallas, Moor began playing college soccer for the Furman Paladins before transferring to the Indiana Hoosiers. After three seasons with the Hoosiers, and helping the side with the 2004 College Cup, Moor was drafted in the first round of the 2005 MLS SuperDraft by FC Dallas with the 6th overall pick. He spent five seasons with FC Dallas, winning U.S. Open Cup titles, before being traded to the Colorado Rapids. In his full-debut season, Moor helped the Rapids win MLS Cup 2010, the club's first league championship title. In 2016, signed with Toronto FC and spent four seasons with the club before returning to the Rapids in 2020. During his time at Toronto FC, Moor was part of the side which won MLS Cup 2017, the Supporters' Shield, and three Canadian Championship titles.

Moor has been capped five times by the United States national team between 2007 and 2008.

== College career ==
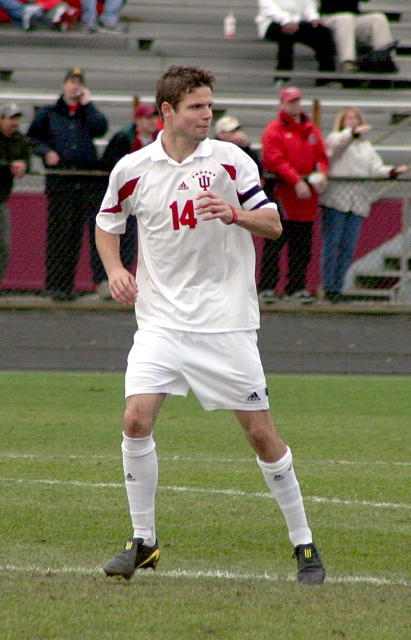
Moor playing for Indiana University in 2004

Moor attended the Episcopal School of Dallas, and played college soccer for Furman University in 2002.

In 2003 Moor transferred to Indiana University, where he played for two seasons. He started every game during his college career and helped the Hoosiers to back-to-back National Championships. His last collegiate game was in the penalty kick thriller against UC Santa Barbara in the 2004 NCAA Finals in which Moor's Indiana was triumphant.

Moor was named All-Big Ten as a sophomore and a first-team All-American as a junior before forgoing his final year of eligibility to declare himself eligible for the MLS Superdraft.

== Club career ==
=== Chicago Fire Premier ===
Moor spent the summer of 2004 playing for Chicago Fire Premier in the Premier Development League.

=== FC Dallas ===
Moor was drafted by FC Dallas with the sixth overall pick of the 2005 MLS SuperDraft. Moor made 20 appearances, including 9 starts, in his rookie season.

2006 was a breakout year for the second-year defender. He started in 21 consecutive games and set career highs in every statistical category. Moor scored his first career MLS goal on May 6, 2006, against the Houston Dynamo in a 4–3 loss.

In 2007, Moor led the team with 28 starts and scored two goals including a game-winning header against the Colorado Rapids on August 4, 2007, in a 1–0 victory. Moor made 27 appearances during the 2008 season, seven of them as the team captain. He led all FC Dallas defenders with two goals and was second in minutes played with 2,430 behind Kenny Cooper (2,622).

=== Colorado Rapids ===
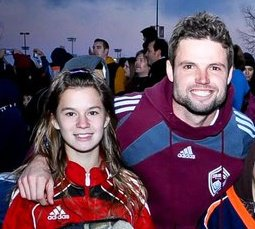
Drew posing with a fan at the 2010 MLS Cup celebration.

On August 31, 2009, Moor was traded to the Colorado Rapids along with a FC Dallas's second-round 2010 MLS SuperDraft pick and allocation money in exhangce for Ugo Ihemelu.

On June 5, 2010, Moor scored his first goal in a Rapids jersey, which won the game in the 85th minute against the Columbus Crew.

On August 31, 2011, Moor finished his 68th consecutive complete MLS game, breaking the MLS record for field players held by Peter Vermes.

Moor was named an MLS All-Star in 2015.

=== Toronto FC ===
Following the 2015 season, Moor signed with Toronto FC as a free agent. He became a key contributor to Toronto's success in the 2016 and 2017 seasons, where they reached the MLS Cup Finals both years, winning the title in 2017. However, injuries became a factor for him in his third and fourth seasons with the club, reducing his playing time.

=== Return to Colorado ===
Following the 2019 season, Moor rejoined Colorado, signing as a free agent. During the 2020 season, the Rapids experienced a COVID-19 outbreak in the team with many players and coaches becoming infected. Due to the entire coaching staff being unavailable, Moor was cast in the role of player-coach, running training sessions, although he never served in a role during a match, as all team matches were instead postponed. On September 30, 2022, Moor announced on his official Instagram account that he will retire once the 2022 season concludes.

== Coaching ==
Moor has publicly stated that he would consider a career in coaching soccer following his professional playing days on many occasions. On October 23, 2020, an article from The Denver Post revealed that in late September 2020, Moor had taken up a temporary role as a player-coach with Colorado amid a COVID-19 outbreak that left the entire coaching staff unavailable. Moor ran training sessions during his time in charge but did not serve in the role of a coach during a competitive match as all matches were postponed and Colorado head coach Robin Fraser returned to the field ahead of a match versus Sporting Kansas City on October 24, 2020.

== International career ==
Moor played for various youth United States national teams, and was part of the U-20 squad for the 2003 World Youth Championship in the United Arab Emirates.

In 2007, Moor received his first call up to the United States men's national soccer team, joining the team on June 24, 2007. On July 2, 2007, Moor made his international debut against Paraguay in a 3–1 loss. He played for the United States in 2007 Copa América and started for the men's national team in a friendly versus Mexico on February 6, 2008, where he assisted Jozy Altidore for his first international goal.

== Career statistics ==
=== Club ===
Appearances and goals by club, season and competition
Club	Season	League			National Cup (Note: Includes U.S. Open Cup and Canadian Championship)		Continental (Note: Includes North American SuperLiga and CONCACAF Champions League)		Playoffs		Total	
Club	Season	Division	Apps	Goals	Apps	Goals	Apps	Goals	Apps	Goals	Apps	Goals
FC Dallas	2005	MLS	20	0	0	0	—		1	0	21	0
FC Dallas	2006	MLS	27	1	0	0	—		2	0	29	1
FC Dallas	2007	MLS	28	2	1	0	2	0	2	0	33	2
FC Dallas	2008	MLS	27	2	2	0	—		—		29	2
FC Dallas	2009	MLS	21	3	1 (Note: Appearance in U.S. Open Cup qualifying match)	0	—		—		22	3
FC Dallas	Total		123	8	4	0	2	0	5	0	134	8
Colorado Rapids	2009	MLS	8	0	0	0	—		—		8	0
Colorado Rapids	2010	MLS	30	1	0	0	—		4	0	34	1
Colorado Rapids	2011	MLS	32	4	0	0	4	0	2	0	38	4
Colorado Rapids	2012	MLS	34	3	0	0	—		—		34	3
Colorado Rapids	2013	MLS	32	3	0	0	—		1	0	33	3
Colorado Rapids	2014	MLS	23	2	1	0	—		—		24	2
Colorado Rapids	2015	MLS	22	1	1	0	—		—		23	1
Colorado Rapids	Total		181	14	2	0	4	0	7	0	194	14
Toronto FC	2016	MLS	32	3	3	0	—		6	0	41	3
Toronto FC	2017	MLS	25	2	4	0	—		5	0	34	2
Toronto FC	2018	MLS	8	0	0	0	7	0	—		15	0
Toronto FC	2019	MLS	13	0	3	1	1	0	1	0	18	1
Toronto FC	Total		78	5	10	1	8	0	12	0	108	6
Colorado Rapids	2020	MLS	8 (Note: Includes two appearances in MLS is Back Tournament group stage)	1	—		—		0	0	8	1
Colorado Rapids	2021	MLS	12	0	—		—		0	0	12	0
Colorado Rapids	2022	MLS	9	0	0	0	0	0	0	0	9	0
Colorado Rapids	Total		29	1	0	0	0	0	0	0	29	1
Colorado Rapids 2	2022	MLS Next Pro	1	0	—		—		—		1	0
Career total			412	28	13	1	14	0	24	0	463	29

=== International ===
Appearances and goals by national team and year
United States
Year	Apps	Goals
2007	2	0
2008	3	0
Total	5	0

== Honors ==
Indiana University

- College Cup: 2004

FC Dallas

- U.S. Open Cup runner-up (2): 2005, 2007

Colorado Rapids

- Eastern Conference Championship: 2010
- MLS Cup: 2010

Toronto FC

- MLS Cup: 2017;
  - Runner-up 2016, 2019
- Canadian Championship (3): 2016, 2017, 2018
  - Runner-up 2019
- Supporters' Shield: 2017
- CONCACAF Champions League runner-up: 2018
- Trillium Cup (3): 2016, 2017, 2019
- Eastern Conference (Playoffs) (3): 2016, 2017, 2019

Individual

- MLS record for most consecutive games played by a field player (68)
- MLS All-Star: 2015
- MLS 400 Games Club
