= 2007 FC Dallas season =

FC Dallas
2007 season
- Owner: Clark Hunt
- Head coach: Steve Morrow
- Stadium: Pizza Hut Park
- MLS: Conference: 2nd Overall: 5th
- MLS Cup: Lost Western Conference Semifinals vs. Houston Dynamo (1–1)
- U.S. Open Cup: Lost Championship Game vs. New England Revolution (0–1)
- SuperLiga: Group Round
- Brimstone Cup: Won Championship vs. Chicago Fire (1-0–1)
- Texas Derby: Lost vs. Houston Dynamo (0–3–1)
- Average home league attendance: 15,145
Home colors	Away colors

The 2007 FC Dallas season was the eleventh season of the Major League Soccer team. During the offseason, long-time owner and partial founder of the MLS Lamar Hunt died. His son, Clark Hunt, took control of the team. The team was invite to participate in the first SuperLiga tournament. The team did not make it out of the Group stage.

== Final standings ==
Pos	Team	Pld	W	L	T	GF	GA	GD	Pts	Qualification
1	Chivas USA	30	15	7	8	46	28	+18	53	MLS Cup Playoffs
2	Houston Dynamo	30	15	8	7	43	23	+20	52	MLS Cup Playoffs
3	FC Dallas	30	13	12	5	37	44	−7	44	MLS Cup Playoffs
4	Colorado Rapids	30	9	13	8	29	34	−5	35	
5	LA Galaxy	30	9	14	7	38	48	−10	34	
6	Real Salt Lake	30	6	15	9	31	45	−14	27	

Source: MLS

== Regular season ==
April 7, 2007	FC Dallas	2–2	Real Salt Lake	Salt Lake City, Utah
				Stadium: Rice-Eccles Stadium

April 12, 2007	FC Dallas	2–1	Los Angeles Galaxy	Carson, California
				Stadium: The Home Depot Center

April 15, 2007	FC Dallas	0–3	New York Red Bulls	East Rutherford, New Jersey
				Stadium: Giants Stadium

April 22, 2007	Colorado Rapids	1–3	FC Dallas	Frisco, Texas
				Stadium: Pizza Hut Park

April 26, 2007	New York Red Bulls	1–0	FC Dallas	Frisco, Texas
				Stadium: Pizza Hut Park

April 29, 2007	New England Revolution	1–0	FC Dallas	Frisco, Texas
				Stadium: Pizza Hut Park

May 12, 2007	FC Dallas	2–1	Kansas City Wizards	Kansas City, Missouri
				Stadium: Arrowhead Stadium

May 17, 2007	FC Dallas	2–1	Chicago Fire	Bridgeview, Illinois
				Stadium: Toyota Park

May 20, 2007	Real Salt Lake	1–2	FC Dallas	Frisco, Texas
				Stadium: Pizza Hut Park

May 26, 2007	FC Dallas	0–2	Chivas USA	Carson, California
				Stadium: The Home Depot Center

June 3, 2007 Texas Derby	FC Dallas	1–2	Houston Dynamo	Houston, Texas
				Stadium: Robertson Stadium

June 9, 2007	Los Angeles Galaxy	1–3	FC Dallas	Frisco, Texas
				Stadium: Pizza Hut Park

June 14, 2007	FC Dallas	1–0	Real Salt Lake	Salt Lake City, Utah
				Stadium: Rice-Eccles Stadium

June 17, 2007	FC Dallas	0–4	Toronto FC	Toronto, Ontario
				Stadium: BMO Field

June 23, 2007	FC Dallas	1–0	Colorado Rapids	Commerce City, Colorado
				Stadium: Dick's Sporting Goods Park

June 30, 2007 Texas Derby	Houston Dynamo	0–0	FC Dallas	Frisco, Texas
				Stadium: Pizza Hut Park

July 4, 2007	Chivas USA	0–2	FC Dallas	Frisco, Texas
				Stadium: Pizza Hut Park

July 14, 2007	FC Dallas	3–3	D.C. United	Washington, D.C.
				Stadium: RFK Stadium

August 4, 2007	Colorado Rapids	0–1	FC Dallas	Frisco, Texas
				Stadium: Pizza Hut Park

August 11, 2007	Columbus Crew	2–3	FC Dallas	Frisco, Texas
				Stadium: Pizza Hut Park

August 19, 2007 Texas Derby	FC Dallas	1–0	Houston Dynamo	Houston, Texas
				Stadium: Robertson Stadium

September 1, 2007	D.C. United	4–0	FC Dallas	Frisco, Texas
				Stadium: Pizza Hut Park

September 8, 2007	Toronto FC	0–2	FC Dallas	Frisco, Texas
				Stadium: Pizza Hut Park

September 15, 2007	FC Dallas	2–4	New England Revolution	Foxborough, Massachusetts
				Stadium: Gillette Stadium

September 20, 2007	Chicago Fire	1–1	FC Dallas	Frisco, Texas
				Stadium: Pizza Hut Park

September 23, 2007	FC Dallas	1–2	Los Angeles Galaxy	Carson, California
				Stadium: The Home Depot Center

September 30, 2007 Texas Derby	Houston Dynamo	3–0	FC Dallas	Frisco, Texas
				Stadium: Pizza Hut Park

October 6, 2007	FC Dallas	3–1	Columbus Crew	Columbus, Ohio
				Stadium: Crew Stadium

October 11, 2007	Chivas USA	0–0	FC Dallas	Frisco, Texas
				Stadium: Pizza Hut Park

October 20, 2007	Kansas City Wizards	2–0	FC Dallas	Frisco, Texas
				Stadium: Pizza Hut Park

== Playoffs ==
=== Western Conference semifinals ===
October 27, 2007 Game 1	Houston Dynamo	0–1	FC Dallas	Frisco, Texas
	Cochrane (yellow card) 26'		Ruíz (yellow card) 19'; Goodson 23'; Ricchetti (yellow card) 58'; Oduro (yellow card) 79'	Stadium: Pizza Hut Park; Referee: 12,537

November 2, 2007 Game 2	FC Dallas	1–4 (OT) (2-4 agg.)	Houston Dynamo	Houston, Texas
	Ruíz 14'; Sala (yellow card) 24'; Denílson (yellow card) 39'; C Gbandi (yellow card) 44'; Alvarez (red card) 47'; Serioux (yellow card) 78'; Moor (yellow card) 99'; Moor (yellow card) 119' (red card); Ricchetti (yellow card) 120'		Mulrooney (yellow card) 28'; Robinson (yellow card) 40'; Holden 67'; Ching 72'; Ching 97'; Onstad (yellow card) 98'; Davis 100'; De Rosario (yellow card) 109'	Stadium: Robertson Stadium; Attendance: 30,088

== U.S. Open Cup ==
July 9, 2007 Third Round	Atlanta Silverbacks (Georgia (U.S. state))	1–1 (SO) (4–3 p)	(Texas) FC Dallas	Frisco, Texas
	Antoniuk 78'		Ruiz 74'	Stadium: Pizza Hut Park; Attendance: 2,510; Referee: Colin Tait (USA)
	Penalties
	Rios (penalty scored); Moore (penalty missed); O'Brien (penalty missed); Rivillo (penalty scored); Hayes (penalty scored); Buete (penalty missed)		Ruiz (penalty scored); Ricchetti (penalty missed); Toja (penalty missed); Gbandi (penalty scored); Thompson (penalty scored); Álvarez (penalty scored)

August 7, 2007 Quarterfinal	FC Dallas (Texas)	2–1 (OT)	(South Carolina) Charleston Battery	Charleston, South Carolina
	Goodson 22'; Álvarez 95'		Armstrong 17'	Stadium: Blackbaud Stadium; Attendance: 3,262; Referee: Hilario Grajeda (USA)

September 4, 2007 Semifinal	FC Dallas (Texas)	2–1 (OT)	(Washington (state)) Seattle Sounders	Seattle, Washington
	Ruiz 92'; Thompson 119' (pen)	(Report)	O'Brien 120'+	Stadium: Qwest Field; Attendance: 10,385; Referee: Abiodun Okulaja (USA)

October 3, 2007 Championship	New England Revolution (Massachusetts)	3–2	(Texas) FC Dallas	Frisco, Texas
	Noonan 21'; Twellman 41'; Thompson 57'		Álvarez 30'; Thompson 64'	Stadium: Pizza Hut Park; Attendance: 10,618; Referee: Alex Prus (USA)

== SuperLiga ==
=== Group Round ===
July 24, 2007 Game 1	CD Guadalajara (Mexico)	1–1	(United States) FC Dallas	Frisco, Texas
	Olvera 67'		Alvarez 56'; Moor (red card) 72'	Stadium: Pizza Hut Park; Attendance: 12,641

July 28, 2007 Game 2	CF Pachuca (Mexico)	1–1	(United States) FC Dallas	Frisco, Texas
	Giménez 87' (pen.)		Ruíz 75'	Stadium: Pizza Hut Park; Attendance: 7,953

July 31, 2007 Game 3	Los Angeles Galaxy (United States)	6–5	(United States) FC Dallas	Frisco, Texas
	Gordon 3'; Klein 12'; Gordon 15'; Harmse 18'; Donovan 84'; Pavón 90+5'		Alvarez 43'; Toja 78'; Alvarez 82'; Ruíz 90+1'; Thompson 90+6'	Stadium: Pizza Hut Park; Attendance: 21,576
