= 2006 FC Dallas season =

FC Dallas
2006 season
- Owner: Lamar Hunt
- Head coach: Colin Clarke
- Stadium: Pizza Hut Park
- MLS: Conference: 1st Overall: 2nd
- MLS Cup: Lost Western Conference Semifinals vs Colorado Rapids (1–1)
- U.S. Open Cup: Lost Quarterfinal vs. Houston Dynamo (0–3)
- Brimstone Cup: Won Championship vs. Chicago Fire (2–0)
- Texas Derby: Lost vs. Houston Dynamo (1–2–1)
- Average home league attendance: 14,982
| Home colors | Away colors | Third colors |

The 2006 FC Dallas season was the tenth season of the Major League Soccer team. It was the most successful regular season in franchise history, and was the only time that the team secured the #1 seed in the Western Conference. After an elimination against the Colorado Rapids in a shootout in Game 2 of the Western Conference Semifinals, head coach Colin Clarke was fired and replaced by Steve Morrow. It was also the final season under owner Lamar Hunt, who died soon thereafter.

== Final standings ==
| Pos | Team | Pld | W | L | T | GF | GA | GD | Pts | Qualification |
|---|---|---|---|---|---|---|---|---|---|---|
| 1 | FC Dallas | 32 | 16 | 12 | 4 | 48 | 44 | +4 | 52 | MLS Cup Playoffs |
| 2 | Houston Dynamo | 32 | 11 | 8 | 13 | 44 | 40 | +4 | 46 | MLS Cup Playoffs |
| 3 | Chivas USA | 32 | 10 | 9 | 13 | 45 | 42 | +3 | 43 | MLS Cup Playoffs |
| 4 | Colorado Rapids | 32 | 11 | 13 | 8 | 36 | 49 | −13 | 41 | MLS Cup Playoffs |
| 5 | Los Angeles Galaxy | 32 | 11 | 15 | 6 | 37 | 37 | 0 | 39 | |
| 6 | Real Salt Lake | 32 | 10 | 13 | 9 | 45 | 49 | −4 | 39 | |

Source: MLS

== Regular season ==
| April 1, 2006 | Chicago Fire | 2–3 | FC Dallas | Frisco, Texas |
| 15:00 pm cdt | | | | Stadium: Pizza Hut Park |

| April 8, 2006 | Real Salt Lake | 1–2 | FC Dallas | Frisco, Texas |
| | | | | Stadium: Pizza Hut Park |

| April 15, 2006 | FC Dallas | 2–2 | Colorado Rapids | Denver, Colorado |
| | | | | Stadium: Invesco Field at Mile High |

| April 23, 2006 | Kansas City Wizards | 1–2 | FC Dallas | Frisco, Texas |
| | | | | Stadium: Pizza Hut Park |

| April 29, 2006 | FC Dallas | 1–1 | D.C. United | Washington, D.C. |
| | | | | Stadium: RFK Stadium |

| May 6, 2006 Texas Derby | FC Dallas | 3–4 | Houston Dynamo | Houston, Texas |
| | | | | Stadium: Robertson Stadium |

| May 10, 2006 | Los Angeles Galaxy | 0–1 | FC Dallas | Frisco, Texas |
| | | | | Stadium: Pizza Hut Park |

| May 13, 2006 Texas Derby | Houston Dynamo | 1–1 | FC Dallas | Frisco, Texas |
| | | | | Stadium: Pizza Hut Park |

| May 20, 2006 | New England Revolution | 0–4 | FC Dallas | Frisco, Texas |
| | | | | Stadium: Pizza Hut Park |

| May 24, 2006 | FC Dallas | 2–1 | New York Red Bulls | East Rutherford, New Jersey |
| | | | | Stadium: Giants Stadium |

| June 3, 2006 | Columbus Crew | 2–1 | FC Dallas | Frisco, Texas |
| | | | | Stadium: Pizza Hut Park |

| June 11, 2006 | Chivas USA | 1–2 | FC Dallas | Frisco, Texas |
| | | | | Stadium: Pizza Hut Park |

| June 24, 2006 | Colorado Rapids | 0–1 | FC Dallas | Frisco, Texas |
| | | | | Stadium: Pizza Hut Park |

| June 28, 2006 | FC Dallas | 0–1 | New England Revolution | Foxborough, Massachusetts |
| | | | | Stadium: Gillette Stadium |

| July 1, 2006 | FC Dallas | 0–3 | Chivas USA | Carson, California |
| | | | | Stadium: The Home Depot Center |

| July 4, 2006 | D.C. United | 1–0 | FC Dallas | Frisco, Texas |
| | | | | Stadium: Pizza Hut Park |

| July 8, 2006 | New York Red Bulls | 1–2 | FC Dallas | Frisco, Texas |
| | | | | Stadium: Pizza Hut Park |

| July 15, 2006 | FC Dallas | 3–2 | Chicago Fire | Bridgeview, Illinois |
| | | | | Stadium: Toyota Park |

| July 22, 2006 | FC Dallas | 1–0 | Real Salt Lake | Salt Lake City, Utah |
| | | | | Stadium: Rice-Eccles Stadium |

| July 29, 2006 | Colorado Rapids | 1–4 | FC Dallas | Frisco, Texas |
| | | | | Stadium: Pizza Hut Park |

| August 12, 2006 Texas Derby | Houston Dynamo | 1–0 | FC Dallas | Frisco, Texas |
| | | | | Stadium: Pizza Hut Park |

| August 20, 2006 | FC Dallas | 0–2 | Los Angeles Galaxy | Carson, California |
| | | | | Stadium: The Home Depot Center |

| August 27, 2006 | FC Dallas | 0–1 | Kansas City Wizards | Kansas City, Missouri |
| | | | | Stadium: Arrowhead Stadium |

| August 30, 2006 | FC Dallas | 2–0 | Colorado Rapids | Denver, Colorado |
| | | | | Stadium: Invesco Field at Mile High |

| September 2, 2006 Texas Derby | Houston Dynamo | 0–1 | FC Dallas | Frisco, Texas |
| | | | | Stadium: Pizza Hut Park |

| September 9, 2006 | FC Dallas | 1–1 | Chivas USA | Carson, California |
| | | | | Stadium: The Home Depot Center |

| September 13, 2006 | Chivas USA | 1–0 | FC Dallas | Frisco, Texas |
| | | | | Stadium: Pizza Hut Park |

| September 16, 2006 | FC Dallas | 2–3 | Real Salt Lake | Salt Lake City, Utah |
| | | | | Stadium: Rice-Eccles Stadium |

| September 23, 2006 | Real Salt Lake | 1–2 | FC Dallas | Frisco, Texas |
| | | | | Stadium: Pizza Hut Park |

| September 30, 2006 | FC Dallas | 1–3 | Columbus Crew | Columbus, Ohio |
| | | | | Stadium: Columbus Crew Stadium |

| October 7, 2006 | Los Angeles Galaxy | 1–2 | FC Dallas | Frisco, Texas |
| | | | | Stadium: Pizza Hut Park |

| October 14, 2006 | FC Dallas | 2–5 | Los Angeles Galaxy | Carson, California |
| | | | | Stadium: The Home Depot Center |

== Playoffs ==
=== Western Conference semifinals ===
| October 21, 2006 Game 1 | FC Dallas | 2–1 | Colorado Rapids | Denver, Colorado |
| | Ruiz 15' (yellow card) 90'; Thompson 55' | | Cooke 23'; Gargan (yellow card) 57'; Beckerman (yellow card) 86'; Martins (red card) 88' | Stadium: Invesco Field at Mile High; Attendance: 5,176 |

| October 28, 2006 Game 2 | Colorado Rapids | 3–2 (SO) (4-4 agg.) (5–4 p) | FC Dallas | Frisco, Texas |
| | Mastroeni (yellow card) 26'; Wingert (yellow card) 53'; Hernandez 57', 83'; Noel (yellow card) 101'; Mathis 114' | | Gbandi (red card) 29'; Ruiz 48'; Goodson 92'; Saragosa (yellow card) 112' | Stadium: Pizza Hut Park; Attendance: 15,486 |
| | Penalties |
| | Mathis (penalty scored); Hernández (penalty scored); Kirovski (penalty scored); Beckerman (penalty scored); Karanka (penalty missed); Mastroeni (penalty scored) | | Ruíz (penalty scored); O'Brien (penalty scored); Mulrooney (penalty scored); Vanney (penalty missed); Valakari (penalty scored); Sala (penalty missed) |

== U.S. Open Cup ==
| August 2, 2006 Fourth Round | FC Dallas (Texas) | 3–3 (SO) (5–3 p) | (South Carolina) Charleston Battery | Charleston, South Carolina |
| | Cooper 45', 89', 120' | | Hollinsworth 63' (pen.); Fuller 91' (pen.); Harrington 114' | Stadium: Blackbaud Stadium; Attendance: 2,332 |
| | Penalties |
| | O’Brien (penalty scored); Gbandi (penalty scored); Núñez (penalty scored); Cooper (penalty scored); Valakari (penalty scored) | | Harrington (penalty scored); Alavanja (penalty scored); Lesesne (penalty scored); Vecollone (penalty missed) |

| August 23, 2006 Quarterfinal | FC Dallas (Texas) | 0–3 | (Texas) Houston Dynamo | Houston, Texas |
| | | | Robinson 13'; Moreno 57'; Wondolowski 61' | Stadium: Carl Lewis Track & Field Stadium; Attendance: 4,000 |
