= Blue Valley Sports Complex =

Sports complex in Kansas, US

Coordinates: 38°52′44″N 94°41′44″W

The Blue Valley Sports Complex (or the District Athletic Complex, commonly known as the DAC) is a baseball, football, swimming and soccer complex located in Overland Park, Kansas. The complex is regularly home to the local high schools, Blue Valley North High School, Blue Valley Northwest High School, and Blue Valley West High School, and also held various games for Sporting Kansas City in 2001, 2004, 2006, and 2011.
