= Terry Vaughn (referee) =

American soccer referee (1973–2023)

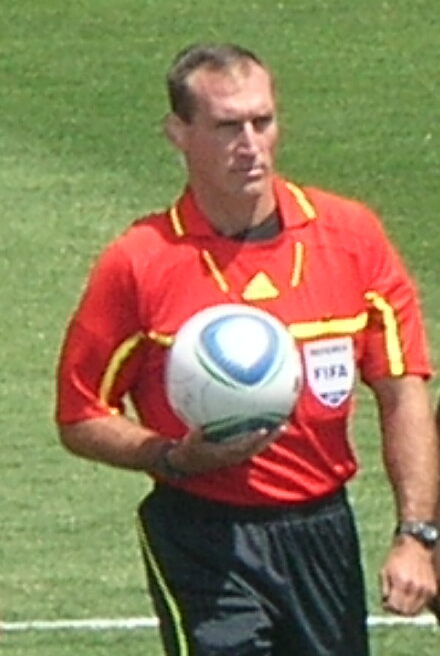
- Vaughn during a 2010 MLS match
- Born: April 1, 1973
- Died: May 4, 2023 (aged 50)

Domestic
Years	League	Role
1998-2012	Major League Soccer	Referee

International
Years	League	Role
2004-2011	FIFA	Referee

Terry Vaughn (April 1, 1973 – May 4, 2023) was an American soccer referee.

== Early life ==
Terry Vaughn was born in Mount Vernon, Iowa, on April 1, 1973. He graduated from Iowa City West High School in 1992, where he was a wrestler and soccer player. He attended Coe College and decided to enter refereeing instead of continuing his career as a player.

== Career ==
In 1998 Vaughn became a National referee for the United States Soccer Federation. He continued to hold a referee license until his retirement in 2012. During his career, Vaughn officiated 237 Major League Soccer matches.

Vaughn was appointed to the FIFA panel in 2003 and oversaw matches in the 2009 and 2010 CONCACAF Champions League, the 2007 FIFA U-20 World Cup, and the 2009 CONCACAF Gold Cup. Vaughn was also a member of the FIFA Panel for the United States Soccer Federation. He refereed the 2006 US Open Cup final.

== Personal life ==
Vaughn was diagnosed with Huntington's disease, an inherited neurodegenerative disease, at the age of 30 in 2003. He retired from refereeing in 2012 after his symptoms worsened. He died on May 4, 2023.

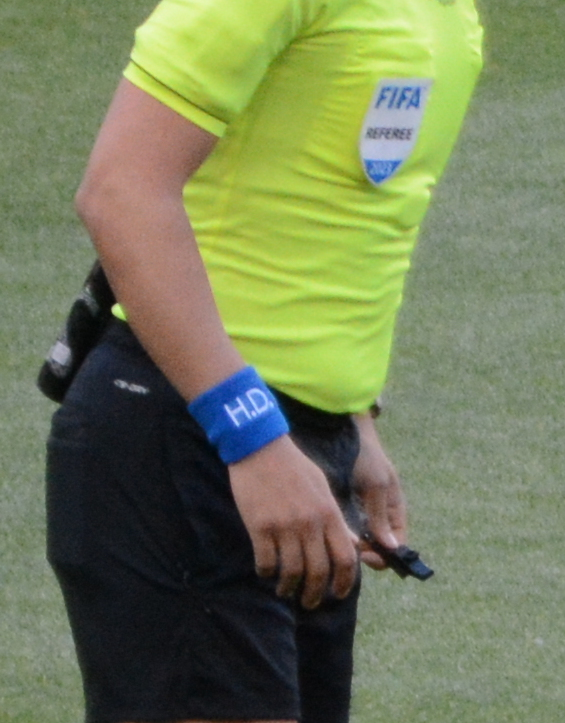
Referee wearing blue H.D. wristband to honor Terry Vaughn's battle with Huntington's Disease.

As a show of solidarity, PRO referees started wearing blue wristbands with "HD" (for Huntington's Disease) during May, Huntington's Disease Awareness Month. This began a trend of referees from grassroots to PRO wearing the bands year - round. US Soccer's official uniform supplier began selling the wristbands with the proceeds going to Terry Vaughn's family to help offset medical costs.

A page on GoFundMe was founded to help Terry and his family pay medical bills by a fellow referee.

== Legacy ==
The Iowa Referee Academy has been renamed the Terry Vaughn Referee Academy in his honor.
