= Toni Nhleko =

South African soccer player (born 1979)

Nkosinathi Nhleko
Personal information
- Full name: Nkosinathi Nhleko
- Date of birth: 24 July 1979 (age 47)
- Place of birth: Ermelo, South Africa
- Height: 1.82 m (5 ft 11 1/2 in)
- Position: Striker

Youth career
- School of Excellence

Senior career*
Years	Team	Apps	(Gls)
1998–2002	Jomo Cosmos	60	(26)
2002–2003	Brann	15	(2)
2003–2004	→F.C. Dallas	11	(2)
2004–2005	F.C. Dallas	22	(5)
2005	Jomo Cosmos	11	(3)
2005–2006	Viking	26	(8)
2006–2007	Hammarby IF	12	(0)
2007	→Sandefjord	7	(1)
2007–2008	Jomo Cosmos	11	(1)
2008–2009	Thanda Royal Zulu	28	(8)
2009–2011	Kaizer Chiefs	29	(6)
2012–2013	Antaliay FC	9	(11)

International career
2000–2005	South Africa	10	(1)
- * Club domestic league appearances and goals

Nkosinathi Nhleko (born 24 July 1979) is a South African retired soccer player who last played as a striker for Kaizer Chiefs.

Nhleko was a stocky built striker known for his pace and ability to hold up the ball and turn defenders not so much for his goal scoring exploits.

== Club career ==
Nhleko began his professional career with South African club Jomo Cosmos, for whom he played from 1998 to 2002.

In 2002, Nhleko moved to Brann of Norway; although he appeared in 20 games, including two UEFA Cup matches, Nhleko had trouble adjusting to the climate and environment at Brann, and during the summer of 2003, was loaned to Major League Soccer's Dallas Burn for the rest of the season.

Nhleko performed well in 11 games with the Burn, showing strength and power possessed by few MLS forwards, registering two goals and four assists while teaming well with Eddie Johnson. The team bought Nhleko in the 2004 offseason for a nominal fee, and he played a larger role in the team's 2004 offense. Appearing either as a substitute for Jason Kreis or a starter with Eddie Johnson, Nhleko played in 23 games for Dallas in 2004, 13 of them starts, while scoring six goals and two assists. He left the team after the season, coming back to the Cosmos.

He arrived for his second spell at Jomo Cosmos in January 2005 but his stay was short lived as he moved back to Europe, where he was signed by Roy Hodgson.

In July 2005, Nhleko returned to Norway to play for Viking. He helped Viking by scoring to beat AS Monaco and Slavia Prague in the 2005 Uefa cup.

In August 2006 he was sold to Swedish club Hammarby IF. In August 2007 he was loaned out to Sandefjord until November 2007. He returned to Jomo Cosmos.

His third stint at Jomo Cosmos proved to be fruitless. He failed to score a single league goal in a team who were struggling to find goals to fight off relegation. He did however score a cup goal in a 1–0 win over Golden Arrows in a Nedbank Cup Last 32 Round match.

After Jomo Cosmos relegation from the Premier Soccer League during the 2007/08 season, Nhleko signed for Thanda Royal Zulu on a Bosman free transfer.

== International career ==
Nhleko has made ten appearances scoring one goal for the South African national team, playing in the 2004 African Nations Cup.

== Career statistics ==
=== International ===
Appearances and goals by national team and year
National team	Year	Apps	Goals
South Africa	2000	1	0
South Africa	2001	4	1
South Africa	2002	1	0
South Africa	2003	2	0
South Africa	2004	1	0
South Africa	2005	1	0
Total		10	1

Scores and results list South Africa's goal tally first, score column indicates score after each Nhleko goal.

List of international goals scored by Toni Nhleko
No.	Date	Venue	Opponent	Score	Result	Competition
1	29 April 2001	Estádio do Maxaquene, Maputo, Mozambique	Mozambique	2–0	3–0	2001 COSAFA Cup
