= Philip Salyer =

American soccer player

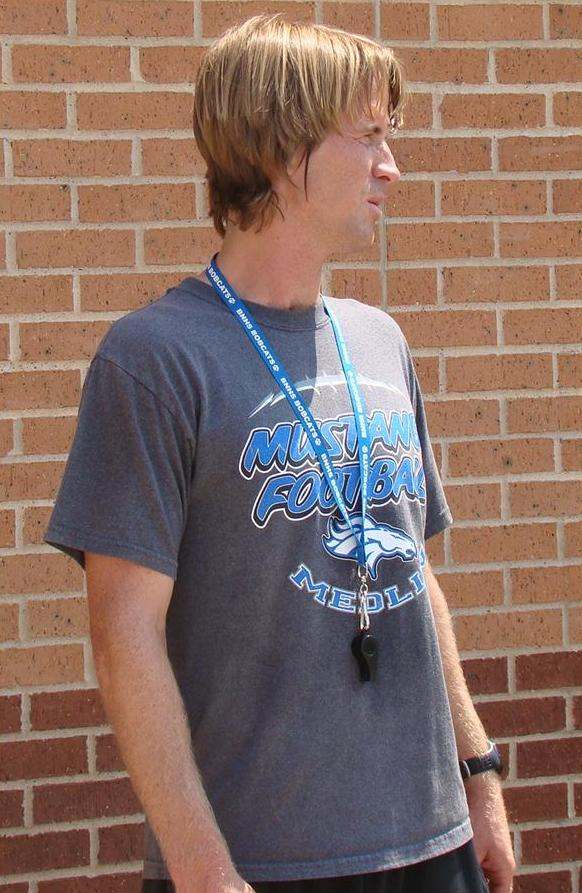
- Salyer in 2012

Personal information
- Date of birth: October 30, 1981 (age 44)
- Place of birth: Oklahoma City, United States
- Height: 1.77 m (5 ft 10 in)
- Positions: Midfielder; left-back

College career
Years	Team	Apps	(Gls)
2000-2001	University of Maryland	40	(6)

Senior career*
Years	Team	Apps	(Gls)
2002	Werder Bremen II	13	(1)
2002	Werder Bremen		
2003-2005	Dallas Burn	24	

Managerial career
- St. Mark's School of Texas
- * Club domestic league appearances and goals

Philip Preston Jr. Salyer (born October 30, 1981) is an American soccer player who played as a midfielder or left-back for Werder Bremen II in the Regionalliga Nord and for F.C. Dallas of Major League Soccer.

== Biography ==
Salyer played college soccer for the University of Maryland in the fall of 2000 and 2001, starting 40 games and registering 6 goals and 6 assists. After his sophomore season, Salyer left Maryland, choosing to play for Werder Bremen reserve team, with whom he signed in January 2002.

After slightly under a year with the Werder Bremen reserves, Salyer returned to the United States in search of more playing time. He was drafted by the Dallas Burn in the 2003 MLS supplemental draft, joining the team soon after the season had begun. In his first season with Dallas, Salyer received limited playing time, seeing only 491 minutes in 8 games, but showed promise.

By the beginning of the 2004 season, Salyer looked to have secured the starting right back position for the Burn, as his competition Tenywa Bonseu, Ryan Suarez, and Shavar Thomas had all left the club during the offseason. Salyer indeed held firmly to the position during the beginning of the season, but was eventually replaced by the more experienced Carey Talley. He ended the season with no points in 1407 minutes, including 16 starts. Salyer was released by Dallas midway through the 2005 season.

Salyer has played with the youth United States national teams, including at the 2001 World Youth Championship in Argentina.

He currently lives in the Dallas/Fort Worth Metroplex. He coached 8th grade soccer at St. Mark's School of Texas.

After Salyer played for FC Dallas, he got a job at Medlin Middle School and coached PE for two years until getting a job at Byron Nelson High School. He works at Byron Nelson High School in Trophy Club, TX and teaches World Geography.
