= Steve Jolley =

American soccer player

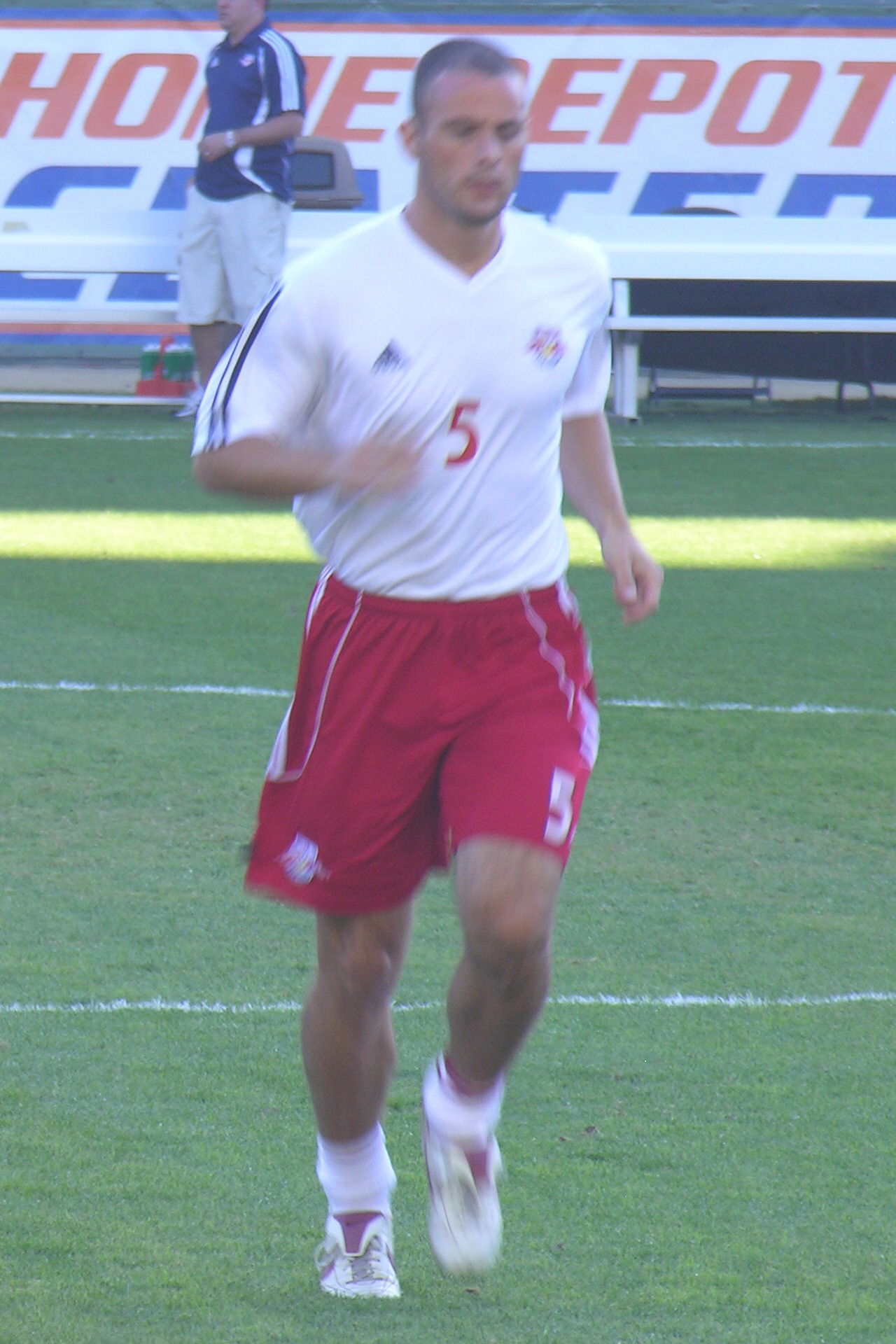

Personal information
- Date of birth: October 15, 1975 (age 51)
- Place of birth: Virginia Beach, Virginia, U.S.
- Height: 6 ft 1 in (1.85 m)
- Position: Defender

College career
Years	Team	Apps	(Gls)
1993–1996	William & Mary Tribe		

Senior career*
Years	Team	Apps	(Gls)
1997–2000	Los Angeles Galaxy	66	(4)
2000–2003	MetroStars	104	(7)
2004–2005	FC Dallas	41	(1)
2006	New York Red Bulls	16	(0)
2007	Long Island Rough Riders	6	(0)
- * Club domestic league appearances and goals

Steve Jolley (born October 15, 1975) is an American retired soccer defender, who spent ten seasons in Major League Soccer and one in the Premier Development League. Today, Jolley provides color commentary for the New York Red Bull's games on Red Bulls Radio. Additionally, he works for a wealth management firm, Walsh & Nicholson Financial Group.

== Career ==
Jolley led Kempsville High School to back-to-back Virginia state championships. After playing college soccer at College of William and Mary, Jolley was drafted by the Los Angeles Galaxy with the ninth overall pick of the 1997 MLS College Draft. He spent the next three years in Los Angeles, switching from the midfield into defense as time went on. The lowlight of his Galaxy career came in the 1999 MLS Cup, when Jolley had to come into the game just nine minutes from the start for the injured Robin Fraser. Jolley scored four goals during his time with the Galaxy.

He was traded to the MetroStars for a second-round draft pick after playing just four minutes for the Galaxy in 2000. He combined with Mike Petke and Daniel Hernández on an excellent three-man backline that helped the Metros rise in the MLS standings. Jolley would play every possible Metro minute of the 2000 and 2001 seasons. He finished his Metro career in 2003 with 104 league games and 129 in all competitions (both numbers third in team history), seven goals (eight in all competitions) and six assists. He also became prominent in the community and earned MLS Humanitarian of the Year honors in 2002 in part for his effort for 9/11 related charities.

Jolley was traded to the then-Dallas Burn before the 2004 season for Tenywa Bonseu. He became a regular for Dallas, scoring one goal and starting almost every game, but also had a dubious distinction of scoring two own goals in one game (for Jolley, only one of those was attributed to him). After losing his starting job with the club in 2005, he was traded back to the MetroStars before the 2006 season. At the end of the year, he was waived by the team, which had become known as New York Red Bulls.

After a brief retirement from soccer, he returned in 2007 to play for the Long Island Rough Riders in the Premier Development League.

Jolley now works as an analyst on Red Bulls radio broadcasts.

== Honors ==
Individual

- MLS Humanitarian of the Year Award: 2002
