= Carey Talley =

American soccer player (born 1976)

Personal information
- Full name: Carey Talley
- Date of birth: August 26, 1976 (age 50)
- Place of birth: Memphis, Tennessee, United States
- Height: 6 ft 1 in (1.85 m)
- Position: Defender

College career
Years	Team	Apps	(Gls)
1994–1997	North Carolina Tar Heels		

Senior career*
Years	Team	Apps	(Gls)
1998–2001	D.C. United	109	(9)
1998	→ MLS Pro 40 (loan)	1	(0)
2002–2003	Kansas City Wizards	44	(3)
2004–2005	FC Dallas	43	(0)
2006–2008	Real Salt Lake	60	(5)
2008–2009	Chivas USA	43	(2)
2010	D.C. United	15	(1)
2010	New York Red Bulls	1	(0)

International career^{‡}
1993	United States U17	4	(0)
- * Club domestic league appearances and goals as of October 1, 2010 ‡ National team caps and goals as of April 4, 2010

Carey Talley (born August 26, 1976) is an American former professional soccer player.

== Career ==
=== College ===
Talley played high school soccer for Houston High School in Germantown, Tennessee. His team won the Tennessee Secondary School Athletic Association soccer championship his junior and senior years in 1993 and 1994. He played his club soccer for Memphis Futbol Club. Some notable teammates on his Memphis Futbol Club '76 youth soccer team were future Major League Soccer standouts and United States men's national soccer team members, Richard Mulrooney, Tony Kuhn, Ross Paule and Jonny Walker. Talley played college soccer at the University of North Carolina from 1994 to 1997. He finished his career at UNC with 26 goals and 22 assists in 75 games. On February 1, 2020, Carey was inducted into the Tennessee State Soccer Association Hall of Fame.

=== Professional ===
Upon graduating, Talley was drafted 14th overall by D.C. United in the 1998 MLS College Draft. Talley immediately earned a spot in the United lineup, starting 19 games and appearing in 29; he would remain in that role for the next three years, winning an MLS Cup with the team in 1999. During the 1999 MLS Cup title season Talley scored a career-high 4 goals. He scored his first MLS goal on May 15, 1999, at Kansas City, and started all six playoff matches for DC, including MLS Cup 1999, which United won 2–0 over the Galaxy.

In 2002, Talley was traded to the Kansas City Wizards for future considerations; although he was usually a starter when healthy. Talley had injury problems in 2003, and was subsequently traded in the off-season to the Dallas Burn along with Eric Quill in exchange for Shavar Thomas. Although he had little playing time at the beginning of the season, Talley eventually supplanted Philip Salyer as the team's starting right back, and finished the year with one assist in 19 starts.

After playing in 20 games in 2005, he was shipped to Real Salt Lake. In his first season with RSL, he Posted career-highs after starting in all 30 appearances and logging 2,618 minutes played, and tied for second on squad and recorded a career-best eight assists from his right back position. On May 13, 2006, he recorded his first two-assist game at the Los Angeles Galaxy, helping RSL to a 3–0 win and its first-ever road victory.

On May 9, 2008, he was traded to Chivas USA for a future conditional pick in the 2010 or 2011 MLS SuperDraft. During his stay with Chivas, he appeared in 43 league matches scoring 1 goal, being primarily deployed as the club's starting right back.

In March 2010, he was released by Chivas USA and later signed by D.C. United. Talley appeared in 15 league matches for United upon his return to the side appearing in 15 matches and scoring 1 goal.

He was traded by D.C. United to New York Red Bulls on September 15, 2010, in exchange for a 2011 MLS SuperDraft 2nd round pick. The move was made by New York to help strengthen the squad during its playoff run.

After the 2010 MLS season New York declined Talley's contract option and he elected to participate in the 2010 MLS Re-Entry Draft. Talley became a free agent in Major League Soccer when he was not selected in the Re-Entry draft.

On January 19, 2011, Talley officially announced his retirement from professional soccer.

=== International ===
Although he has played at the U-17, U-20, and U-23 levels, Talley has never made a full United States national team appearance. He has been called into several camps, and came very close to entering a game against Chile in 2000; he was about to be employed as a late-game substitute, but the game was called.

=== Administrative ===
In September 2025, Talley and his brother Clark were announced as owners of USL League Two expansion club Memphis FC.

== Honors ==
=== D.C. United ===
- MLS Cup (1): 1999
- CONCACAF Champions' Cup (1): 1998
- Copa Interamericana (1): 1998
