= Abe Thompson =

American former soccer player (born 1982)

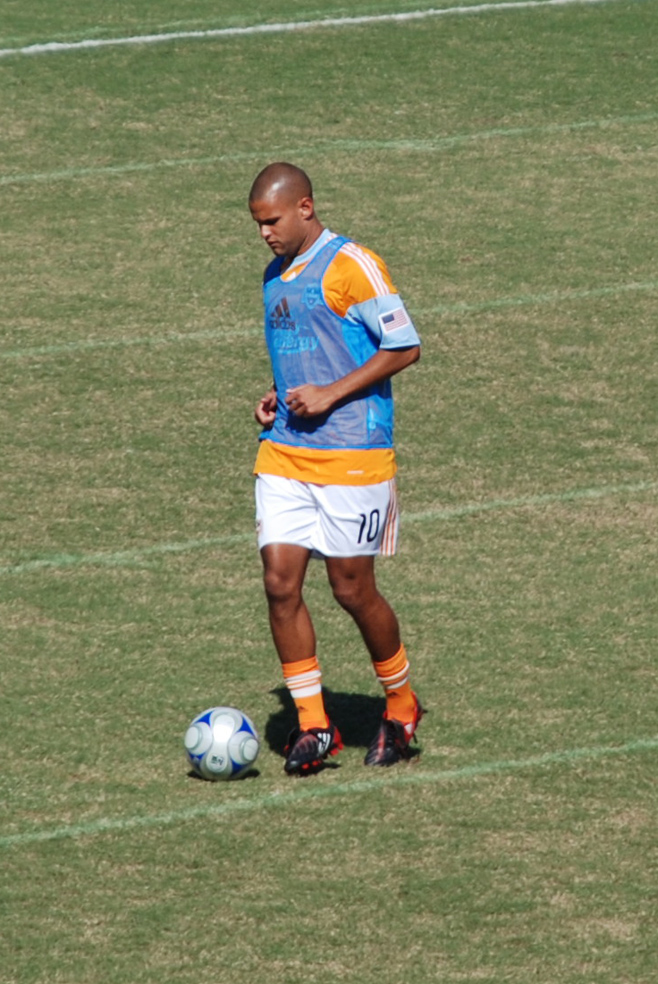

Personal information
- Full name: Abraham Broman Thompson
- Date of birth: January 12, 1982 (age 44)
- Place of birth: Tucson, Arizona, United States
- Height: 6 ft 0 in (1.83 m)
- Position: Forward

Youth career
- 1992-2000: Braddock Road Warhawks

College career
Years	Team	Apps	(Gls)
2000–2004	Maryland Terrapins	79	(43)

Senior career*
Years	Team	Apps	(Gls)
2005–2008	FC Dallas	69	(14)
2008–2009	Kansas City Wizards	16	(0)
2009	Houston Dynamo	1	(1)
2010–2012	Fort Lauderdale Strikers	65	(17)
Total		155+	(33+)

International career
1999	United States U17	6	(1)

Managerial career
- 2012: Fort Lauderdale Strikers (assistant)
- * Club domestic league appearances and goals

Abraham Broman "Abe" Thompson (born January 12, 1982) is an American former soccer player.

== Youth and college ==
Born in Tucson, Arizona, Thompson attended Wilbert Tucker Woodson High School in Virginia, helping the Cavaliers win the 2000 VHSL Triple A State championship and was inducted in to the school's Hall of Fame in 2012. Thompson represented the USA in the 1999 U17 World Cup in New Zealand. He played college soccer at the University of Maryland from 2000 to 2005, where he appeared in 79 games scoring 43 goals and adding 26 assists. He was named a Hermann Trophy semifinalist in 2004 and 2005, and finished his career as the school's all-time points leader.

Thompson also played club soccer for the Braddock Road Warhawks, with whom he won the 1999 Don Greer Cup (the US U-17 National Championship).

Thompson was inducted in to the Virginia/DC Soccer Hall of Fame in 2021 along with best friend and teammate, Clarence Goodson.

== Professional career ==
Thompson was drafted in the second round, 16th overall, of the 2005 MLS Supplemental Draft by FC Dallas, and subsequently spent four years in Texas. He was traded to Kansas City Wizards on September 5, 2008, in exchange for allocation money. Houston Dynamo acquired Thompson and allocation money from Kansas City in exchange for forward Kei Kamara during the 2009 season. Thompson signed with Miami FC/Fort Lauderdale Strikers on March 18, 2010. Fort Lauderdale re-signed Thompson in February 2012 as both player and assistant coach. At the end of the season, Thompson retired from professional soccer.
