= Chris Gbandi =

Liberian footballer

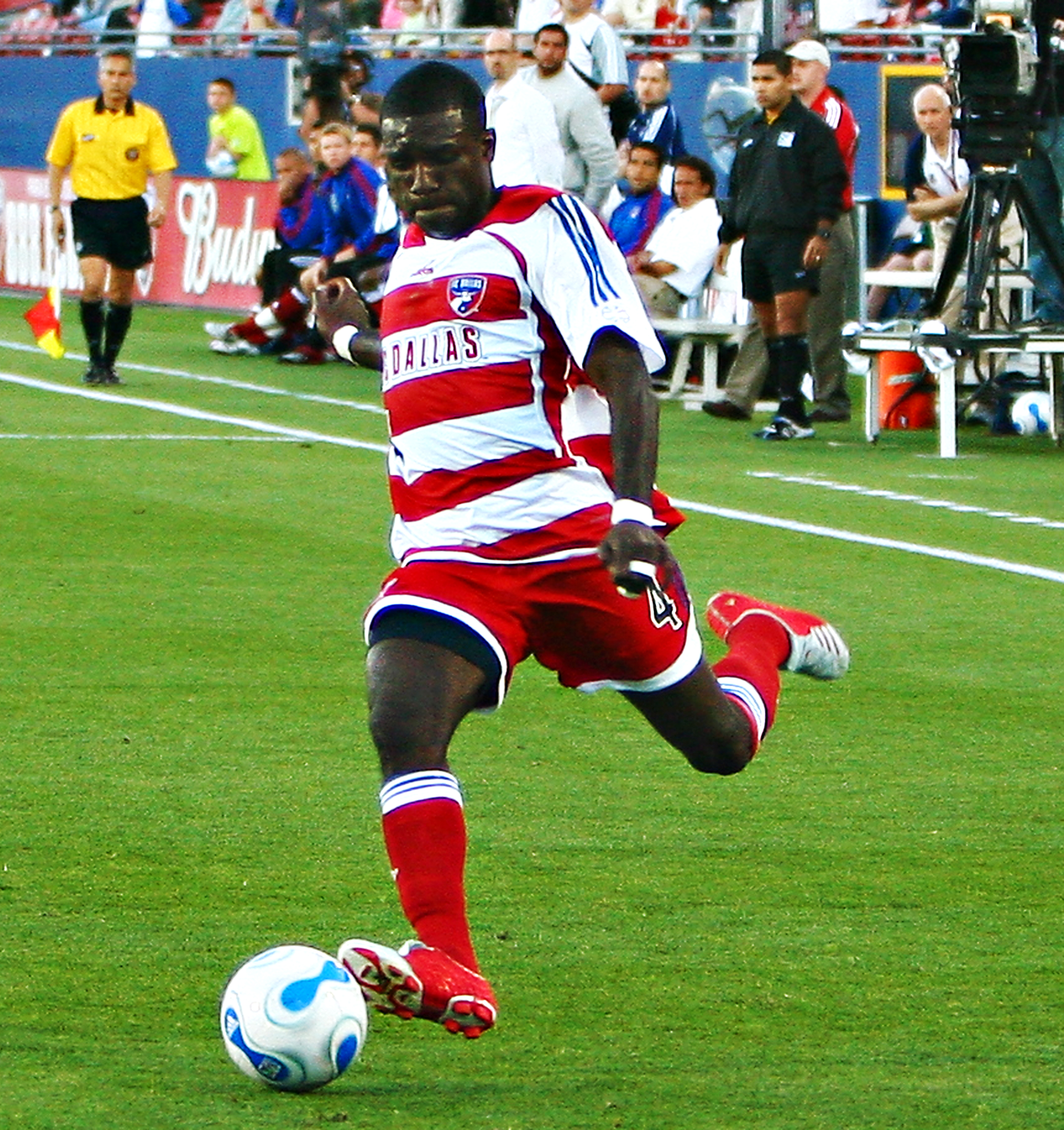

Personal information
- Full name: Chris Gbandi
- Date of birth: April 7, 1979 (age 47)
- Place of birth: Bong County, Liberia
- Height: 5 ft 10 in (1.78 m)
- Position: Left back

Team information
- Current team: UConn Huskies (head coach)

College career
Years	Team	Apps	(Gls)
1998–2001	UConn Huskies		

Senior career*
Years	Team	Apps	(Gls)
2002–2007	FC Dallas	111	(3)
2008–2009	Haugesund	37	(5)
2010	Miami FC	19	(0)

International career^{‡}
2004	Liberia	1	(0)

Managerial career
- 2011: University of Connecticut (assistant)
- 2012–13: Holy Cross (assistant)
- 2014–2015: Dartmouth Big Green (assistant)
- 2016–2021: Northeastern Huskies
- 2022–: UConn Huskies
- * Club domestic league appearances and goals as of September 25, 2010 ‡ National team caps and goals as of July 16, 2006

Chris Gbandi (born April 7, 1979) is a Liberian former footballer who is currently the head coach of the UConn Huskies men's soccer team.

== Career ==
=== College ===
Gbandi played college soccer at the University of Connecticut, where he was a finalist for the Hermann Trophy in 1999 and 2001, and a winner in 2000 (he was named First Team All-American during his last two years in college).

=== Professional ===
Gbandi was drafted with the first overall pick of the 2002 MLS SuperDraft by Dallas Burn, but missed all of the 2002 season while rehabilitating a torn anterior cruciate ligament (ACL). He returned in the 2003 season, where he registered one goal and two assists after playing 22 games in a disappointing campaign for the Burn. Gbandi played in another 23 games in 2004. In 2005, Gbandi made 17 appearances, all starts, and scored what happened to be the last goal ever scored at the Cotton Bowl by an FC Dallas player. 2006 was his best season yet, Gbandi played in 28 games and earned FC Dallas's defender of the year honors. Over the off season, Gbandi had a trial with IK Start, but nothing became of it.

2007 was another good year for Gbandi, he made 21 appearances and scored a spectacular goal against Real Salt Lake.

On February 8, 2008, he completed a transfer to Norwegian club FK Haugesund, where he spent the next two seasons, scoring 5 goals in 37 appearances for the team.

Gbandi returned to the United States in 2010 when he signed with USSF Division 2 club Miami FC.

=== International ===
It was speculated that Gbandi might cap for the United States national team, but in 2004 he accepted an offer from the Liberian national team to compete in the 2006 World Cup qualifiers, making him ineligible for the US squad.

=== Coaching ===
Gbandi served as an assistant coach at UConn, Holy Cross, and Dartmouth before earning his first head coaching job at Northeastern. He was named head coach at UConn on December 17, 2021.

== Personal ==
Gbandi's brother, Sandy Gbandi, is also a former professional footballer.
