= Ronnie O'Brien =

Irish footballer

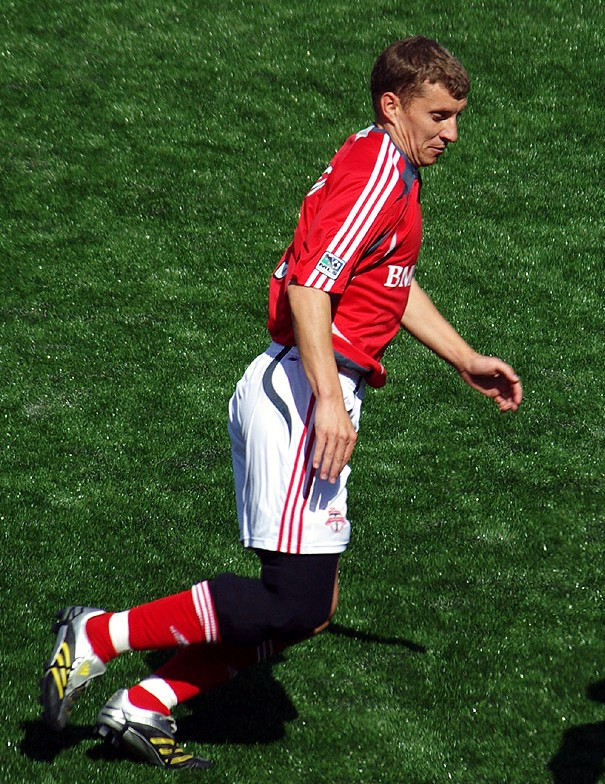
- O'Brien with Toronto FC in 2007

Personal information
- Date of birth: 5 January 1979 (age 47)
- Place of birth: Bray, County Wicklow, Ireland
- Position: Midfielder

Senior career*
Years	Team	Apps	(Gls)
1997–1999	Middlesbrough	0	(0)
1999–2002	Juventus	0	(0)
1999	→ AC Lugano (loan)	8	(0)
2000–2001	→ Crotone (loan)	4	(0)
2001	→ Lecco (loan)	8	(0)
2001–2002	→ Dundee United (loan)	6	(0)
2002–2006	FC Dallas	108	(12)
2007	Toronto FC	13	(0)
2008	San Jose Earthquakes	28	(4)
Total		175	(16)

International career^{‡}
1997–1998	Republic of Ireland U16		
- * Club domestic league appearances and goals as of 17 August 2018 ‡ National team caps and goals as of 7 April 2018

Ronnie O'Brien (born 5 January 1979) is an Irish retired footballer.

Although released early in his career by his first club Middlesbrough, he was subsequently signed by Juventus in 1999. During three years with the Italian club, he played only occasionally for the first team and was loaned out to Lugano in Switzerland, lower division Italian clubs Crotone and Lecco, and Dundee United in Scotland. After leaving Juventus in 2002, O'Brien spent the rest of his career playing in Major League Soccer (MLS) for FC Dallas, Toronto FC and San Jose Earthquakes before retiring in 2008. He was named in the MLS Best XI in both 2004 and 2005, and was selected for the MLS All-Star Game for four years running.

O'Brien also represented the Republic of Ireland under-16 team and was part of the squad that won the 1998 Under-16 European Championship.

== Playing career ==
=== Club career ===
O'Brien's footballing career began very promisingly, when at the age of 18 he signed a contract with Middlesbrough of the FA Premier League. After two years and little playing time with Middlesbrough, O'Brien was released on a free transfer.

Italian giants Juventus offered the 20-year-old O'Brien a five-year contract; however, he had trouble getting playing time on such a talented side and was loaned out to Lugano of Switzerland, Dundee United of Scotland, and lower league Italian side Lecco. After several years of disappointment and one Intertoto Cup appearance, O'Brien was released from his contract with Juventus in 2002.

His solitary competitive appearance for Juventus was an Intertoto Cup match against Rostov on 4 August 1999 when he entered the match as a substitute for Zoran Mirković in the 77th minute.

==== MLS ====
In search of consistent playing time, O'Brien, made the unconventional decision to move to America to join the Dallas Burn. O'Brien made an immediate impact, scoring on his debut for the club in a US Open Cup match. He finished the 2002 season with two goals and two assists in 11 games but had proven himself one of the more dynamic players on the team. O'Brien entered the 2003 season with great expectations, but these were cut short early in the season. In the Burn's third game of the season, a tackle from D.C. United's Dema Kovalenko broke O'Brien's tibia, effectively ending his season. O'Brien returned to the team in 2004 and was one of the team's offensive leaders – he started 29 games, registering two goals and 10 assists, was named to the MLS Best XI, and helped revitalise a Burn team that had recorded one of the league's worst records ever in the previous season.

In 2005, O'Brien repeated his Best XI form, finishing the year with six goals and 12 assists. During the 2006 season, O'Brien clashed with FC Dallas' head coach Colin Clarke all season. His form was poor and he finished with only one goal in 27 games. At the conclusion of the season, O'Brien was traded to the expansion club Toronto FC with a gentlemen's agreement that Toronto FC would not draft any other FC Dallas players.

Due to a knee injury during a training session, which was later aggravated during a friendly match, O'Brien was limited to 13 games in the 2007 season.

In 2008, O'Brien was traded to the San Jose Earthquakes. In return, Toronto FC received San Jose's first round pick in the 2009 draft plus an undisclosed amount of money. He made 28 appearances, scoring four goals (his 16th in the MLS). His six assists brought his MLS career assist total to 45 (from 142 total appearances).

Following O'Brien's strong performance and evident leadership in 2008, the San Jose Earthquakes stunned their fans by failing to pick up his contract option for the 2009 season. Instead, Earthquakes' GM John Doyle was hoping that he would accept a substantial pay cut. In January 2009, O'Brien made it known that he would not be returning to the San Jose Earthquakes. Without O'Brien's leadership and strong play, the Earthquakes struggled early in 2009. Despite a favourable schedule in which San Jose played five of their seven games at home, the Quakes managed just one win, leading many San Jose fans to call for O'Brien's return.

=== International career ===
O'Brien achieved success with the Republic of Ireland national youth sides, including winning the 1998 Under-16 European Championship alongside John O'Shea.

Despite having played multiple times for the Irish underage sides, O'Brien only received one call-up to the senior side. Steve Staunton contacted Toronto FC about his availability for a short tour of the US in June 2007. However, O'Brien turned down the chance to play for his country again, as he had just returned from injury, while adding he was happy playing club football.

== Coaching career ==
He is now a coach of FC Dallas' youth teams.

== Personal life ==
O'Brien keeps an off-season residence in Dallas and is an avid Dallas Mavericks fan.

=== Time magazine stunt ===
In August 1999, e-mails circulated urging Irish people to vote for Ronnie O'Brien in Time's Person of the Century Internet poll, causing O'Brien to lead the poll, above those such as Albert Einstein and Martin Luther King Jr. After the poll crashed due to attracting too much traffic, Time removed O'Brien from the running, restating the rule that "whimsical candidates will not be counted."
