= 2006 Columbus Crew season =

Columbus Crew
2006 season
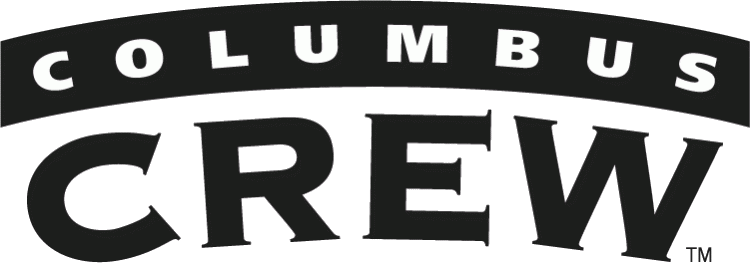
- Investor-operators: Lamar Hunt; Clark Hunt; Dan Hunt; Lamar Hunt Jr. Sharron Hunt Munson; Ron Pizzuti and a group of local investors
- Head Coach: Sigi Schmid
- Stadium: Columbus Crew Stadium
- Major League Soccer: Conference: 6th Overall: 12th
- MLS Cup playoffs: Did not qualify
- U.S. Open Cup: Fourth round
- Top goalscorer: League: Jason Garey; Joseph Ngwenya (5 each); All: Jason Garey; Joseph Ngwenya (5 each)
- Highest home attendance: 20,818 (4/14 v. CHI)
- Lowest home attendance: 8,920 (5/12 v. COL)
- Average home league attendance: 13,294 (58.9%)
- Biggest win: CLB 3–0 NE (9/2); CHI 1-4 CLB (10/7)
- Biggest defeat: DC 1-5 CLB (5/31); KC 4-0 CLB (8/12)
Home colors	Away colors

The 2006 Columbus Crew season was the club's 11th season of existence and their 11th consecutive season in Major League Soccer, the top flight of soccer in the United States. The first match of the season was on April 1 against Kansas City Wizards. It was the first season under head coach Sigi Schmid.

This season is notable for being the first of MLS legend Kei Kamara's career, one which would have him play for a league-record 11 teams by 2025.

== Roster ==
As of September 2, 2006

Note: Flags indicate national team as defined under FIFA eligibility rules; some limited exceptions apply. Players may hold more than one non-FIFA nationality.

No.	Pos.	Nation	Player
1	GK	USA	Jon Busch
2	DF	USA	Frankie Hejduk (captain)
3	DF	USA	Ritchie Kotschau
4	DF	USA	Rusty Pierce
5	MF	USA	Brandon Moss
6	DF	CHI	Marcos González
7	MF	USA	Jacob Thomas
8	DF	NZL	Duncan Oughton
9	FW	USA	Jason Garey
10	FW	ZIM	Joseph Ngwenya
11	MF	USA	Ned Grabavoy
12	MF	USA	Eddie Gaven
13	FW	USA	Marc Burch
14	DF	USA	Chad Marshall
15	MF	MEX	José Retiz

No.	Pos.	Nation	Player
16	FW	SLE	Kei Kamara
17	MF	USA	Danny Szetela
18	FW	USA	Knox Cameron
19	FW	MEX	Ivan Becerra
20	DF	USA	Tim Ward
22	FW	CHI	Sebastián Rozental
23	DF	VIN	Ezra Hendrickson
24	DF	USA	Jed Zayner
25	DF	BRA	Ricardo Virtuoso
28	GK	USA	Andy Gruenebaum
29	GK	USA	Noah Palmer
30	MF	USA	Eric Vasquez
31	GK	PUR	Bill Gaudette
33	DF	USA	Chris Leitch
88	GK	USA	Jonny Walker
99	FW	USA	Ryan Coiner

== Technical Staff ==
Position	Staff
President/General Manager	(United States) Mark McCullers
Head Coach	(Germany) Sigi Schmid
Assistant Coach	(Poland) Robert Warzycha
Assistant Coach	(United States) Mike Lapper
Assistant Coach	(United States) Eduardo Carvacho
Head Trainer	(United States) Rick Guter
Team Manager	(United States) Tucker Walther
Equipment Manager	(United States) Omar Espinal

== Non-competitive ==
=== Preseason ===
The Crew started preseason in Columbus and played games in Florida, Cyprus, Louisiana and California before returning to Ohio.

The Crew brought in the following trialists during training camp: Adam Frye, Brent Rahim, Edwin Miranda, Aleksey Korol, Chris Corcoran, Clint Baumstark and Piotr Świerczewski, Yaniv Abargil and Leonard Bisaku.

Unsigned draft picks Brandon Moss, Dayton O'Brien, Duke Hashimoto, Andy Gruenebaum and Ivan Becerra also joined the team for preseason.

February 10 Friendly	Columbus Crew	0-2	NY/NJ MetroStars	Bradenton, FL
10:00 AM EST		Report	Magee pen.',	Stadium: IMG Academy
Note: Played three 30-minute periods

February 10 Friendly	Columbus Crew	3-1	USASA Amateur Select Team	Bradenton, FL
4:00 PM EST	Wolyniec 17'; Kamara 64'; Storey 78'	Report	28'	Stadium: IMG Academy
Note: Played three 30-minute periods

February 12 Tom Fitzgerald Memorial Soccer Festival	Columbus Crew	1-0	Real Salt Lake	Tampa, FL
6:30 PM EST	Marshall 57'	Report		Stadium: Pepin Stadium

February 14 Friendly	Columbus Crew	0-0	Kansas City Wizards	Tampa, FL
11:00 AM EST		Report		Stadium: University of South Florida

February 15 Friendly	South Florida Bulls	2-5	Columbus Crew	Tampa, FL
11:00 AM EST	Goal	Report	Moss 22'; Corcoran 32'; 52' (o.g.); Rozental 65'; González 70'	Stadium: University of South Florida

February 16 Friendly	Columbus Crew	1-3	Chicago Fire	Bradenton, FL
10:00 AM EST	Cameron 62' (pen.)	Report	Goal	Stadium: IMG Academy

February 25 Friendly	Columbus Crew	3-1	FC Dynamo Kyiv	Ayia Napa, Cyprus
8:30 AM EST	Martino; Zayner; Cameron	Report	Goal

February 27 Friendly	Columbus Crew	1-1	Zagłębie Lubin	Ayia Napa, Cyprus
12:00 PM EST	Marshall	Report	Goal

February 28 Friendly	Columbus Crew	3-1	FC Mordovia Saransk	Ayia Napa, Cyprus
8:00 AM EST	Becerra, Sutton	Report	Goal

March 1 Friendly	Columbus Crew	0-1	Enosis Neon Paralimni FC	Ayia Napa, Cyprus
8:00 AM EST		Report	Goal

March 2 Friendly	Columbus Crew	2-1	Panas	Ayia Napa, Cyprus
12:00 PM EST	O'Brien 25'; Wolyniec 35' (pen.)	Report	85' (pen.)

March 11 Friendly	Columbus Crew	1-1	Real Salt Lake	Lafayette, LA
8:00 PM EST	Kamara 55'	Report	Harris 20'	Stadium: Lafayette Soccer Complex

March 15 Friendly	UC Santa Barbara Gauchos	0-0	Columbus Crew	Santa Barbara, CA
10:30 PM EST		Report		Stadium: Harder Stadium

March 17 Friendly	UC Irvine Anteaters	6-0	Columbus Crew	Irvine, CA
10:00 PM EST		Report	Kamara,, Cameron, Martino	Stadium: Anteater Stadium

March 22 Friendly	Columbus Crew	Cancelled	Chivas USA	San Diego, CA
10:00 PM EST				Stadium: San Ysidro High School

March 23 Friendly	San Diego Toreros	0-3	Columbus Crew	San Diego, CA
			Buddle; Wolyniec; Kamara	Stadium: Torero Stadium

=== Midseason ===
Eberson was a guest player against Everton FC.

April 19 Connor Senn Memorial Game	Ohio State Buckeyes	1-1	Columbus Crew	Columbus, OH
7:00 PM EDT	Edwards 52'	Report	Moss 55'	Stadium: Jesse Owens Memorial Stadium; Attendance: 1,747

April 30 Friendly	Columbus Crew	8-1	Maryland Terrapins	Columbus, OH
11:00 AM EDT	O'Brien; Cameron pen.',, Wolyniec,, Warzycha		Kadotani	Stadium: Columbus Crew Stadium

May 23 Keith Evans Memorial Match	Columbus Crew	3-1	Cincinnati Kings	Obetz, OH
7:00 PM EDT	Goal		Goal	Stadium: Crew Training Center

July 26 Friendly	Columbus Crew	1-1	Everton FC	Columbus, OH
7:00 PM EDT	Rozental 14'	Report	Anichebe 35'	Stadium: Columbus Crew Stadium

=== Postseason ===
November 8 Friendly	Columbus Crew	2-0	C.S.D. Municipal	Columbus, OH
7:30 PM EST	Ward (yellow card) 24'; Grabavoy 34'; Kamara 47'; Thomas (yellow card) 80'; Burch (yellow card) 87'	Report	Melgar (yellow card) 24'; Ponciano (yellow card) 73'; Guevara (yellow card) 77'	Stadium: Columbus Crew Stadium; Attendance: 5,704; Referee: Hilario Grajeda; Assistant referees: Mikael Lundqvist; Michael Salyers; Fourth official: Dion Telting

== Competitive ==
=== Overview ===
Competition	First match	Last match	Starting round	Final position	Record							
Competition	First match	Last match	Starting round	Final position	Pld	W	D	L	GF	GA	GD	Win %
Major League Soccer	April 1, 2006	October 14, 2006	Matchday 1	12th	32	8	9	15	30	42	−12	25.00
U.S. Open Cup	July 12, 2006	August 1, 2006	Third Round	Fourth Round	2	1	0	1	5	2	+3	50.00
Total					34	9	9	16	35	44	−9	26.47

Source: Competitions

=== MLS ===
==== Standings ====
===== Eastern Conference =====
Pos	Team	Pld	W	L	T	GF	GA	GD	Pts	Qualification
2	New England Revolution	32	12	8	12	39	35	+4	48	MLS Cup Playoffs
3	Chicago Fire	32	13	11	8	43	41	+2	47	MLS Cup Playoffs
4	New York Red Bulls	32	9	11	12	41	41	0	39	MLS Cup Playoffs
5	Kansas City Wizards	32	10	14	8	43	45	−2	38	
6	Columbus Crew	32	8	15	9	30	42	−12	33	

Source: MLS

===== Overall table =====
Pos	Team	Pld	W	L	T	GF	GA	GD	Pts	Qualification
8	New York Red Bulls	32	9	11	12	41	41	0	39	
9	Los Angeles Galaxy	32	11	15	6	37	37	0	39	North American SuperLiga
10	Real Salt Lake	32	10	13	9	45	49	−4	39	
11	Kansas City Wizards	32	10	14	8	43	45	−2	38	
12	Columbus Crew	32	8	15	9	30	42	−12	33	

Source: MLS
Rules for classification: 1) points; 2) head-to-head record; 3) goal difference; 4) number of goals scored

==== Results summary ====
Overall								Home						Away					
Pld	Pts	W	L	T	GF	GA	GD	W	L	T	GF	GA	GD	W	L	T	GF	GA	GD
32	33	8	15	9	30	42	−12	4	6	6	16	16	0	4	9	3	14	26	−12

Source: MLS standings
Pld = Matches played; Pts = Points; W = Matches won; T = Matches tied; L = Matches lost; GF = Goals for; GA = Goals against; GD = Goal difference

==== Results by round ====
Round	1	2	3	4	5	6	7	8	9	10	11	12	13	14	15	16	17	18	19	20	21	22	23	24	25	26	27	28	29	30	31	32
Stadium	A	A	H	A	H	A	H	H	A	A	H	A	H	H	A	A	H	A	H	H	A	A	H	H	A	H	H	A	H	H	A	A
Result	L	L	T	W	L	W	W	T	L	W	L	L	T	T	T	T	L	L	L	T	T	L	L	W	L	W	L	L	T	W	W	L

Source: schedule
A = Away; H = Home; W = Win; L = Loss; T = Tie

==== Match results ====
April 1 1	Kansas City Wizards	3-1	Columbus Crew	Kansas City, MO
8:30 PM EDT	Arnaud 21'; Jewsbury 25'; Thomas (yellow card) 58'; Johnson 61', (yellow card) 61'	Report	Kamara 33'; Pierce (yellow card) 64'	Stadium: Arrowhead Stadium; Attendance: 18,143; Referee: Mark Geiger; Assistant referees: Fabio Tovar; Rob Fereday; Fourth official: Marcel Yonan

April 8 2	Colorado Rapids	3-1	Columbus Crew	Denver, CO
9:00 PM EDT	Kirovski 35'; Beckerman 50', (yellow card) 59'; Noël 67'; Freeman (yellow card) 73'; Gargan (yellow card) 81'	Report	Marshall 10'; Hejduk (yellow card) 54'; Retiz (yellow card) 83'	Stadium: Invesco Field at Mile High; Attendance: 12,124; Referee: Terry Vaughn; Assistant referees: Emiliano Monje; Paul Scott; Fourth official: Colin Tait

April 15 3	Columbus Crew	1-1	Chicago Fire	Columbus, OH
4:00 PM EDT	Rozental 55' (pen.); Moss (yellow card) 62'; Kitamirike (yellow card) 72'	Report	Rolfe 49'; Gutiérrez (yellow card) 81'	Stadium: Columbus Crew Stadium; Attendance: 20,818; Referee: Erich Simmons; Assistant referees: Thomas Supple; George Vergara; Fourth official: Hilario Grajeda

April 22 4	Los Angeles Galaxy	0-1	Columbus Crew	Carson, CA
10:30 PM EDT	Roberts (yellow card) 18'; Glen (yellow card) 77'; Gómez (yellow card) 90'	Report	González (yellow card) 12'; Hejduk (yellow card) 82'; Martino 90+6'	Stadium: The Home Depot Center; Attendance: 19,666; Referee: Mauricio Navarro; Assistant referees: Steven Davidson; Amato DeLuca; Fourth official: Silviu Petrescu

April 29 5	Columbus Crew	0-1	Kansas City Wizards	Columbus, OH
7:30 PM EDT	Rozental (yellow card) 34'; Moss (yellow card) 43'; Martino (yellow card) 58'; Retiz (yellow card) 76'	Report	Arnaud (yellow card) 69'; Jewsbury (yellow card) 80'; Wolff 74'	Stadium: Columbus Crew Stadium; Attendance: 13,399; Referee: Andrew Chapin; Assistant referees: Rob Fereday; Adam Wienckowski; Fourth official: Jozef Batko

May 6 6	Real Salt Lake	0-1	Columbus Crew	Salt Lake City, UT
9:00 PM EDT	Garey 70'; Retiz (red card) 85'	Report	Cunningham (yellow card) 62'; Harris (yellow card) 69'; Talley (yellow card) 79'; Ballouchy (yellow card) 90'	Stadium: Rice-Eccles Stadium; Attendance: 15,804; Referee: Ben Jones; Assistant referees: Jose Corro; Corey Rockwell; Fourth official: Ramon Hernandez

May 13 7	Columbus Crew	1-0	Colorado Rapids	Columbus, OH
7:30 PM EDT	Leitch (yellow card) 7'; Grabavoy 74'	Report	Beckerman (yellow card) 22'; Mathis (yellow card) 89'	Stadium: Columbus Crew Stadium; Attendance: 8,920; Referee: Jorge Gonzalez; Assistant referees: Greg Barkey; Anthony Vasoli; Fourth official: Hilario Grajeda

May 20 8	Columbus Crew	1-1	D.C. United	Columbus, OH
7:30 PM EDT	Ngwenya 23'	Report	Gómez 29'; Namoff (yellow card) 53'	Stadium: Columbus Crew Stadium; Attendance: 12,646; Referee: Richard Heron; Assistant referees: Richard Eddy; C.J. Morgante; Fourth official: Mikael Lundqvist

May 31 9	D.C. United	5-1	Columbus Crew	Washington, D.C.
7:30 PM EDT	Moreno 8'; Hendrickson 48' (pen.); Gros 58'; Eskandarian 71'; Filomeno 78'	Report	Popik (yellow card) 7'; Ngwenya 21', (yellow card) 45'	Stadium: Robert F. Kennedy Memorial Stadium; Attendance: 11,725; Referee: Jair Marrufo; Assistant referees: Nate Clement; George Vergara; Fourth official: Mark Geiger

June 3 10	FC Dallas	1-2	Columbus Crew	Frisco, TX
8:30 PM EDT	Moor (yellow card) 73'; Vanney (yellow card) 84'; Ruíz 90+1'	Report	Bisaku 75'; Ngwenya (yellow card) 84'; Kotschau 89'	Stadium: Pizza Hut Park; Attendance: 11,085; Referee: Baldomero Toledo; Assistant referees: Kermit Quisenberry; Paul Scott; Fourth official: Adam Garner

June 10 11	Columbus Crew	0-1	Kansas City Wizards	Columbus, OH
7:30 PM EDT	Retiz (yellow card) 40'; Grabavoy (yellow card) 55'	Report	Watson (yellow card) 5'; Zavagnin (yellow card) 64'; Burciaga 89'	Stadium: Columbus Crew Stadium; Attendance: 11,754; Referee: Alex Prus; Assistant referees: Steve Taylor; Jorge De La Bandera; Fourth official: Mikael Lundqvist

June 18 12	Chivas USA	2-0	Columbus Crew	Carson, CA
10:00 PM EDT	Razov 5'; Hernandez (yellow card) 45'; García 85'	Report	Kotschau (yellow card) 34'	Stadium: The Home Depot Center; Attendance: 12,293; Referee: Ricardo Salazar; Assistant referees: Steven Davidson; Fabio Tovar; Fourth official: Kari Seitz

June 21 13	Columbus Crew	1-1	New England Revolution	Columbus, OH
7:30 PM EDT	Kamara 86'; González (yellow card) 90'	Report	Dorman 66'; Twellman (yellow card) 70'	Stadium: Columbus Crew Stadium; Attendance: 9,491; Referee: Jair Marrufo; Assistant referees: George Gansner; Joe Ellis; Fourth official: Hilario Grajeda

June 24 14	Columbus Crew	1-1	Chivas USA	Columbus, OH
7:30 PM EDT	Retiz 12'; González (yellow card) 33'; Kotschau (yellow card) 43'	Report	Kljestan (yellow card) 26'; Razov (yellow card) 37'; Regan (yellow card) 41'; García 54'	Stadium: Columbus Crew Stadium; Attendance: 12,095; Referee: Abbey Okulaja; Assistant referees: Kermit Quisenberry; Michael Salyers; Fourth official: Jeffrey Mellen

June 28 15	New York Red Bulls	0-0	Columbus Crew	East Rutherford, NJ
7:30 PM EDT	Philippe (yellow card) 22'; Mendes (yellow card) 37'	Report	Ward (yellow card) 66'; González (yellow card) 90'	Stadium: Giants Stadium; Attendance: 7,783; Referee: Terry Vaughn; Assistant referees: Nate Clement; Jorge De La Bandera; Fourth official: Jorge Gonzalez

July 4 16	Houston Dynamo	1-1	Columbus Crew	Houston, TX
8:30 PM EDT	Ching 5'; Clark (yellow card) 39'; Robinson (yellow card) 73'	Report	Kotschau (yellow card) 27'; Gaven 66' (pen.); Ngwenya (yellow card) 72'; Bisaku (yellow card) 73'	Stadium: Robertson Stadium; Attendance: 8,497; Referee: Jair Marrufo; Assistant referees: Adam Wienckowski; George Vergara; Fourth official: Colin Tait

July 8 17	Columbus Crew	0-1	D.C. United	Columbus, OH
7:30 PM EDT	González (yellow card) 21'; Retiz (yellow card) 41'; Bisaku (yellow card) 45'	Report	Olsen (yellow card) 21'; Eskandarian 42', (red card) 65'; Boswell (yellow card) 47'	Stadium: Columbus Crew Stadium; Attendance: 14,134; Referee: Mauricio Navarro; Assistant referees: Greg Barkey; Sean Hurd; Fourth official: Rizal Milliken

July 15 18	D.C. United	3-2	Columbus Crew	Washington, D.C.
7:30 PM EDT	Gómez 16'; Carroll (yellow card) 26', (goal) 49'; Olsen 64'	Report	Kamara (yellow card) 35', (goal) 45+1'; Vasquez 72'	Stadium: Robert F. Kennedy Memorial Stadium; Attendance: 20,227; Referee: Michael Kennedy; Assistant referees: Steve Taylor; Bill Dittmar; Fourth official: Alex Prus

July 19 19	Columbus Crew	0-2	New York Red Bulls	Columbus, OH
7:30 PM EDT	Retiz (yellow card) 73'	Report	O'Rourke (yellow card) 34'; Henderson 50'; Laventure 90'	Stadium: Columbus Crew Stadium; Attendance: 16,942; Referee: Ricardo Salazar; Assistant referees: Kermit Quisenberry; C.J. Morgante; Fourth official: Mikael Lundqvist

July 22 20	Columbus Crew	1-1	Los Angeles Galaxy	Columbus, OH
4:00 PM EDT	Gaven 9'	Report	Vagenas 14'	Stadium: Columbus Crew Stadium; Attendance: 11,262; Referee: Richard Heron; Assistant referees: Craig Lowry; Adam Wienckowski; Fourth official: Elias Bazakos

July 29 21	Chicago Fire	0-0	Columbus Crew	Bridgeview, IL
8:30 PM EDT	Gutiérrez (yellow card) 61'	Report	Thomas (yellow card) 31'; Retiz (yellow card) 43'	Stadium: Toyota Park; Attendance: 9,145; Referee: Elias Bazakos; Assistant referees: Nate Clement; George Vergara; Fourth official: Michael Kennedy

August 12 22	Kansas City Wizards	4-0	Columbus Crew	Kansas City, MO
8:30 PM EDT	Arnaud 4'; Sealy 17'; Thomas (yellow card) 32'; Sealy (yellow card) 51'; Victorine 78'; Pore 89'	Report	Leitch (yellow card) 37'; Retiz (yellow card) 47'; Gaudette (yellow card) 51'; Marshall (yellow card) 69'	Stadium: Arrowhead Stadium; Attendance: 14,618; Referee: Mark Geiger; Assistant referees: Bill Dittmar; George Gansner; Fourth official: Colin Tait

August 16 23	Columbus Crew	1-2	Real Salt Lake	Columbus, OH
7:30 PM EDT	Rozental 23' (pen.); Kotschau (yellow card) 70'	Report	Pope (yellow card) 8'; Klein 75'; Talley 90'; Garlick (yellow card) 90'	Stadium: Columbus Crew Stadium; Attendance: 20,149; Referee: Baldomero Toledo; Assistant referees: Greg Barkey; Michael Salyers; Fourth official: Mikael Lundqvist

August 19 24	Columbus Crew	1-0	New York Red Bulls	Columbus, OH
7:30 PM EDT	Gaven (yellow card) 50'; Ngwenya 82'; Pierce (yellow card) 86'	Report	Kovalenko (yellow card) 29'; Stammler (yellow card) 90'	Stadium: Columbus Crew Stadium; Attendance: 12,112; Referee: Colin Tait; Assistant referees: Rob Fereday; Richard Eddy; Fourth official: Marcel Yonan

August 27 25	New England Revolution	1-0	Columbus Crew	Foxborough, MA
7:00 PM EDT	Joseph (yellow card) 12'; Twellman (yellow card) 33'; Larentowicz 34'; Dorman (yellow card) 63'; Smith (yellow card) 72'; Riley (yellow card) 87'	Report	Gaven (yellow card) 25'; Garey (yellow card) 39'; Hendrickson (yellow card) 53'; Ngwenya (red card) 63'; Gaudette (yellow card) 63'	Stadium: Gillette Stadium; Attendance: 11,341; Referee: Shane Moody; Assistant referees: George Gansner; Bill Dittmar; Fourth official: Andrew Chapin
Note: Originally scheduled for August 26

September 2 26	Columbus Crew	3-0	New England Revolution	Columbus, OH
7:30 PM EDT	Garey 3'; Oughton (yellow card) 21'; Gaven 39'; Gaven (yellow card) 58'; Pierce (yellow card) 59'; Hendrickson 82'	Report	Franchino (yellow card) 28'	Stadium: Columbus Crew Stadium; Attendance: 10,472; Referee: Jair Marrufo; Assistant referees: C.J. Morgante; Michael Salyers; Fourth official: Hilario Grajeda

September 9 27	Columbus Crew	1-2	Chicago Fire	Columbus, OH
7:30 PM EDT	Pierce (yellow card) 38'; Rozental 72' (pen.)	Report	Segares (yellow card) 15'; Jaqua 40'; Brown 45+2'; Carr (red card) 63'	Stadium: Columbus Crew Stadium; Attendance: 11,141; Referee: Ramon Hernandez; Assistant referees: Greg Barkey; Kyle Borne; Fourth official: Jozef Batko

September 16 28	New York Red Bulls	1-0	Columbus Crew	East Rutherford, NJ
7:30 PM EDT	Mendes (yellow card) 35'; Magee 64'; Altidore (red card) 83'	Report	Ngwenya (red card) 20'; Garey (yellow card) 68'; González (red card) 71'	Stadium: Giants Stadium; Attendance: 11,878; Referee: Baldomero Toledo; Assistant referees: Bill Dittmar; Jorge De La Bandera; Fourth official: Andrew Chapin

September 23 29	Columbus Crew	1-1	Houston Dynamo	Columbus, OH
7:30 PM EDT	Virtuoso (yellow card) 17'; Garey 80'	Report	De Rosario 54'	Stadium: Columbus Crew Stadium; Attendance: 13,505; Referee: Terry Vaughn; Assistant referees: C.J. Morgante; Michael Salyers; Fourth official: Mikael Lundqvist

September 30 30	Columbus Crew	3-1	FC Dallas	Columbus, OH
7:30 PM EDT	Ngwenya 22', (yellow card) 69'; Thomas 66'; Moss (yellow card) 67' (yellow-red card) 81'; Garey 76'	Report	Rhine (yellow card) 5'; Moor (yellow card) 10'; Ruíz 90+1'	Stadium: Columbus Crew Stadium; Attendance: 20,054; Referee: Elias Bazakos; Assistant referees: Rob Fereday; Anthony Vasoli; Fourth official: Hilario Grajeda

October 7 31	Chicago Fire	1-4	Columbus Crew	Bridgeview, IL
8:30 PM EDT	Rolfe 4'	Report	Gaven 26'; Garey 45+3'; Virtuoso 77'; Ngwenya 82'	Stadium: Toyota Park; Attendance: 19,166; Referee: Richard Heron; Assistant referees: Thomas Supple; Adam Wienckowski; Fourth official: Ricardo Salazar

October 14 32	New England Revolution	1-0	Columbus Crew	Foxborough, MA
7:30 PM EDT	Larentowicz (yellow card) 40'; Dempsey (yellow card) 68'; John (yellow card) 76'; Smith 88'	Report	Ngwenya (yellow card) 50'; Pierce (yellow card) 82'	Stadium: Gillette Stadium; Attendance: 10,537; Referee: Michael Kennedy; Assistant referees: Rob Fereday; C.J. Morgante; Fourth official: Erich Simmons

=== MLS Cup Playoffs ===
The Columbus Crew failed to qualify for the playoffs in this season.

=== U.S. Open Cup ===
July 12 Third Round	Michigan Bucks (PDL)	1-4	(Ohio) Columbus Crew (MLS)	Rochester Hills, MI
	Rice 22'	Report	Cameron 17'; Becerra 60'; Thomas 86'; Nelson 88' (o.g.)	Stadium: Stoney Creek High School; Attendance: 3,000; Referee: Hilario Grajeda

August 1 Fourth Round	D.C. United (MLS) (Washington, D.C.)	2-1 (a.e.t.)	(Ohio) Columbus Crew (MLS)	Germantown, MD
	Moreno 22'; Boswell (yellow card) 75'; Walker 93'	Report	González (yellow card) 75'; Marshall 18'; Moss (yellow card) 30'	Stadium: Maryland SoccerPlex; Attendance: 4,774; Referee: Terry Vaughn; Assistant referees: Jeff GontareckJason Cullum; Fourth official: Ben Jones

== Reserve League ==
=== Overall table ===
Pos	Club	Pld	W	L	T	GF	GA	GD	Pts
1	Colorado Rapids Reserves (C)	12	9	3	0	24	14	+10	27
2	Kansas City Wizards Reserves	12	7	3	2	25	16	+9	23
3	Houston Dynamo Reserves	12	7	5	0	24	17	+7	21
3	Real Salt Lake Reserves	12	6	3	3	23	20	+3	21
5	D.C. United Reserves	12	6	5	1	22	11	+11	19
6	FC Dallas Reserves	12	4	3	5	20	13	+7	17
7	New York Red Bulls Reserves	12	5	6	1	15	25	−10	16
8	Chivas USA Reserves	12	4	5	3	18	23	−5	15
9	Los Angeles Galaxy Reserves	12	4	6	2	20	19	+1	14
9	Chicago Fire Reserves	11	4	5	2	16	18	−2	14
11	Columbus Crew Reserves	12	3	8	1	14	23	−9	10
12	New England Revolution Reserves	11	0	7	4	9	31	−22	4

==== Match results ====
April 9 1	Colorado Rapids	4-0	Columbus Crew	Westminster, CO
1:00 PM EDT	Gotsmanov 26'; King 28'; Gonzalez 34' (pen.); Gargan 89'	Report	Kitamirike (yellow card) 41' (yellow-red card) 75'	Stadium: Rapids Training Facility

April 23 2	Los Angeles Galaxy	3-0	Columbus Crew	Carson, CA
	Veris (yellow card) 15'; Gonzalez 33'; Ngwenya 34'; Burch (yellow card) 49'; Gardner 65'	Report	Kotschau (yellow card) 28'	Stadium: The Home Depot Center

May 7 3	Real Salt Lake	2-0	Columbus Crew	Salt Lake City, UT
	Williams 6'; Besagno (yellow card) 45'; Watson 50'; Cabrera (yellow card) 65'	Report	Cameron (yellow card) 34'	Stadium: Rice-Eccles Stadium; Referee: Ramon Hernandez; Assistant referees: Corey Rockwell; Jeff Young; Fourth official: Feliciano Palomino

May 14 4	Columbus Crew	2-3	Colorado Rapids	Obetz, OH
	Cameron 6'; Vasquez 29'; Kamara (yellow card)	Report	Noel 42'; Martins 49', 55'; Keel (yellow card)	Stadium: Crew Training Center

June 4 5	FC Dallas	3-0	Columbus Crew	Frisco, TX
	Charras 16'; Yi (yellow card) 36'; Pitchkolan 39', (yellow card) 66'; Alvarez 82'	Report	Bisaku (yellow card) 59'	Stadium: Pizza Hut Park; Referee: Adam Garner; Assistant referees: Harold Zavalney; Luis Guardia; Fourth official: Blackwell

July 9 6	Columbus Crew	0-1	D.C. United	Obetz, OH
		Report	Nickell (yellow card) 8'; Jeff Carroll 12'	Stadium: Crew Training Center

August 20 7	Columbus Crew	3-1	New York Red Bulls	Obetz, OH
	Coiner 33'; Kamara 53'; Cameron 86'; Moss (yellow card); Ward (yellow card); Burch (yellow card)	Report	Camp 24'; O'Rourke (yellow card)	Stadium: Crew Training Center

September 3 8	Columbus Crew	3-1	New England Revolution	Obetz, OH
	Coiner 2', 51'; Cameron 31'	Report	Wynn (yellow card) 42'; Smith 86'	Stadium: Crew Training Center

September 10 9	Columbus Crew	2-3	Chicago Fire	Obetz, OH
	Burch 23', (yellow card) 72'; Kamara 68'	Report	Griffin (yellow card) 36'; Franks 40', 59'; Torres 70'	Stadium: Crew Training Center

September 17 10	New York Red Bulls	2-1	Columbus Crew	East Rutherford, NJ
	Vide 42'; Magee (yellow card) 42'; Camp 89'	Report	Grabavoy 10'; Burch (yellow card) 48'	Stadium: Giants Stadium

October 1 11	Columbus Crew	0-0	FC Dallas	Columbus, OH
		Report	Oduro (yellow card) 58'	Stadium: Columbus Crew Stadium; Referee: Hilario Grajeda; Assistant referees: Michael Szymanski; Michael Kinder; Fourth official: Michelle Cowman

October 8 12	Chicago Fire	0-3	Columbus Crew	Elmhurst, IL
	Thiago (yellow card) 3'; Curtin (yellow card) 69'	Report	Vasquez 5'; Rozental 57'; Weaver 59', (yellow card) 69'	Stadium: Langhorst Field; Referee: Ricardo Salazar; Assistant referees: Peter Manikowski; Peter Balciunas; Fourth official: Jose Gesundheit

== Statistics ==
=== Appearances and goals ===
Under "Apps" for each section, the first number represents the number of starts, and the second number represents appearances as a substitute.

No.	Pos	Nat	Player	Total		MLS		U.S. Open Cup	
No.	Pos	Nat	Player	Apps	Goals	Apps	Goals	Apps	Goals
1	GK	(United States) USA	Jon Busch	8	0	8+0	0	0+0	0
2	DF	(United States) USA	Frankie Hejduk	4	0	4+0	0	0+0	0
3	DF	(United States) USA	Ritchie Kotschau	28	1	23+3	1	1+1	0
4	DF	(United States) USA	Rusty Pierce	18	0	18+0	0	0+0	0
5	MF	(United States) USA	Brandon Moss	22	0	17+3	0	2+0	0
6	DF	(Chile) CHI	Marcos González	23	0	20+1	0	2+0	0
7	MF	(United States) USA	Jacob Thomas	20	2	13+6	1	0+1	1
8	DF	(New Zealand) NZL	Duncan Oughton	9	0	9+0	0	0+0	0
9	FW	(United States) USA	Jason Garey	26	5	18+7	5	1+0	0
10	FW	(Zimbabwe) ZIM	Joseph Ngwenya	20	5	17+3	5	0+0	0
11	MF	(United States) USA	Ned Grabavoy	10	1	3+7	1	0+0	0
12	MF	(United States) USA	Eddie Gaven	32	4	30+0	4	2+0	0
13	FW	(United States) USA	Marc Burch	7	0	5+2	0	0+0	0
14	DF	(United States) USA	Chad Marshall	28	2	25+1	1	1+1	1
15	MF	(Mexico) MEX	José Retiz	23	1	21+1	1	0+1	0
16	FW	(Sierra Leone) SLE	Kei Kamara	20	3	9+10	3	0+1	0
17	MF	(United States) USA	Danny Szetela	5	0	3+1	0	0+1	0
18	FW	(United States) USA	Knox Cameron	11	1	3+7	0	1+0	1
19	FW	(Mexico) MEX	Ivan Becerra	1	1	0+0	0	1+0	1
20	DF	(United States) USA	Tim Ward	13	0	6+5	0	2+0	0
22	FW	(Chile) CHI	Sebastián Rozental	22	3	15+5	3	2+0	0
23	FW	(Saint Vincent and the Grenadines) VIN	Ezra Hendrickson	26	1	20+4	1	2+0	0
24	DF	(United States) USA	Jed Zayner	0	0	0+0	0	0+0	0
25	DF	(Brazil) BRA	Ricardo Virtuoso	10	1	7+3	1	0+0	0
28	GK	(United States) USA	Andy Gruenebaum	3	0	2+1	0	0+0	0
29	GK	(United States) USA	Noah Palmer	11	0	10+0	0	1+0	0
30	MF	(United States) USA	Eric Vasquez	14	1	4+8	1	2+0	0
31	GK	(Puerto Rico) PUR	Bill Gaudette	12	0	11+0	0	1+0	0
33	DF	(United States) USA	Chris Leitch	26	0	18+6	0	1+1	0
88	GK	(United States) USA	Jonny Walker	0	0	0+0	0	0+0	0
99	FW	(United States) USA	Ryan Coiner	7	0	4+2	0	0+1	0
			Own goal	0	1	-	0	-	1
Players who left Columbus during the season:
10	MF	(United States) USA	Kyle Martino	6	1	4+2	1	0+0	0
11	FW	(United States) USA	John Wolyniec	1	0	0+1	0	0+0	0
13	MF	(United States) USA	Dayton O'Brien	0	0	0+0	0	0+0	0
21	MF	(Croatia) CRO	Leonard Bisaku	7	1	4+3	1	0+0	0
26	DF	(England) ENG	Joel Kitamirike	1	0	0+1	0	0+0	0
27	GK	(United States) USA	Dan Popik	1	0	1+0	0	0+0	0
27	GK	(United States) USA	Dominik Jakubek	0	0	0+0	0	0+0	0
29	FW	(United States) USA	Duke Hashimoto	0	0	0+0	0	0+0	0

=== Disciplinary record ===
No.	Pos.	Name	MLS		U.S. Open Cup		Total	
No.	Pos.	Name	Booked	Sent off (straight red)	Booked	Sent off (straight red)	Booked	Sent off (straight red)
1	GK	(United States) Jon Busch	0	0	0	0	0	0
2	DF	(United States) Frankie Hejduk	2	0	0	0	2	0
3	DF	(United States) Ritchie Kotschau	4	0	0	0	4	0
4	DF	(United States) Rusty Pierce	5	0	0	0	5	0
5	MF	(United States) Brandon Moss	5	1	1	0	6	1
6	DF	(Chile) Marcos González	5	1	1	0	6	1
7	MF	(United States) Jacob Thomas	1	0	0	0	1	0
8	DF	(New Zealand) Duncan Oughton	1	0	0	0	1	0
9	FW	(United States) Jason Garey	2	0	0	0	2	0
10	FW	(Zimbabwe) Joseph Ngwenya	5	2	0	0	5	2
11	MF	(United States) Ned Grabavoy	1	0	0	0	1	0
12	MF	(United States) Eddie Gaven	3	0	0	0	3	0
13	FW	(United States) Marc Burch	0	0	0	0	0	0
14	DF	(United States) Chad Marshall	1	0	0	0	1	0
15	MF	(Mexico) José Retiz	7	1	0	0	7	1
16	FW	(Sierra Leone) Kei Kamara	1	0	0	0	1	0
17	MF	(United States) Danny Szetela	0	0	0	0	0	0
18	FW	(United States) Knox Cameron	0	0	0	0	0	0
19	FW	(Mexico) Ivan Becerra	0	0	0	0	0	0
20	DF	(United States) Tim Ward	1	0	0	0	1	0
22	FW	(Chile) Sebastián Rozental	1	0	0	0	1	0
23	FW	(Saint Vincent and the Grenadines) Ezra Hendrickson	1	0	0	0	1	0
24	DF	(United States) Jed Zayner	0	0	0	0	0	0
25	DF	(Brazil) Ricardo Virtuoso	1	0	0	0	1	0
28	GK	(United States) Andy Gruenebaum	0	0	0	0	0	0
29	GK	(United States) Noah Palmer	0	0	0	0	0	0
30	MF	(United States) Eric Vasquez	0	0	0	0	0	0
31	GK	(Puerto Rico) Bill Gaudette	0	0	0	0	0	0
33	DF	(United States) Chris Leitch	2	0	0	0	2	0
88	GK	(United States) Jonny Walker	0	0	0	0	0	0
99	FW	(United States) Ryan Coiner	0	0	0	0	0	0
Players who left Columbus during the season:
10	MF	(United States) Kyle Martino	1	0	0	0	1	0
11	FW	(United States) John Wolyniec	0	0	0	0	0	0
13	MF	(United States) Dayton O'Brien	0	0	0	0	0	0
21	MF	(Croatia) Leonard Bisaku	2	0	0	0	2	0
26	DF	(England) Joel Kitamirike	1	0	0	0	1	0
27	GK	(United States) Dan Popik	1	0	0	0	1	0
27	GK	(United States) Dominik Jakubek	0	0	0	0	0	0
29	FW	(United States) Duke Hashimoto	0	0	0	0	0	0

=== Clean sheets ===
No.	Name	MLS	U.S. Open Cup	Total	Games Played
1	(United States) Jon Busch	3	0	3	8
28	(United States) Andy Gruenebaum	0	0	0	3
29	(United States) Noah Palmer	1	0	1	11
31	(Puerto Rico) Bill Gaudette	3	0	3	12
88	(United States) Jonny Walker	0	0	0	0
Players who left Columbus during the season:
27	(United States) Dan Popik	0	0	0	1
27	(United States) Dominik Jakubek	0	0	0	0

== Reserve League Statistics ==
=== Appearances and goals ===
Under "Apps" for each section, the first number represents the number of starts, and the second number represents appearances as a substitute.

No.	Pos	Nat	Player	Total		MLS Reserve League	
No.	Pos	Nat	Player	Apps	Goals	Apps	Goals
-	MF	(United States) USA	Trey Alexander	2	0	0+2	0
19	FW	(Mexico) MEX	Ivan Becerra	11	0	11+0	0
21	MF	(Croatia) CRO	Leonard Bisaku	2	0	2+0	0
-	MF	(United States) USA	Milton Blanco	4	0	3+1	0
-	MF	(Bulgaria) BUL	Lubomir Bogdanov	1	0	0+1	0
-	FW	(Sierra Leone) SLE	Sallieu Bundu	1	0	0+1	0
13	FW	(United States) USA	Marc Burch	5	1	5+0	1
18	FW	(United States) USA	Knox Cameron	11	3	8+3	3
99	FW	(United States) USA	Ryan Coiner	6	3	6+0	3
-	DF	(United States) USA	Rene Corona	1	0	0+1	0
-	FW	(United States) USA	Brian Cvilikas	2	0	0+2	0
-	GK	(United States) USA	Peter Dzubay	0	0	0+0	0
9	FW	(United States) USA	Jason Garey	2	0	1+1	0
31	GK	(United States) USA	Bill Gaudette	2	0	1+1	0
12	MF	(United States) USA	Eddie Gaven	1	0	0+1	0
6	DF	(Chile) CHI	Marcos González	1	0	1+0	0
11	MF	(United States) USA	Ned Grabavoy	6	1	6+0	1
28	GK	(United States) USA	Andy Gruenebaum	9	0	8+1	0
29	FW	(United States) USA	Duke Hashimoto	4	0	1+3	0
23	DF	(United States) USA	Ezra Hendrickson	2	0	2+0	0
27	GK	(United States) USA	Dominik Jakubek	2	0	2+0	0
-	GK	(United States) USA	Jordan James	0	0	0+0	0
-	MF	(Kuwait) KUW	Nowaf Jaman	1	0	0+1	0
16	FW	(Sierra Leone) SLE	Kei Kamara	10	2	8+2	2
-	FW	(United States) USA	Gus Kartes	1	0	0+1	0
26	DF	(England) ENG	Joel Kitamirike	1	0	1+0	0
3	DF	(United States) USA	Ritchie Kotschau	5	0	5+0	0
-	DF	(Puerto Rico) PUR	John Krause	3	0	0+3	0
33	DF	(United States) USA	Chris Leitch	5	0	5+0	0
-	MF	(United States) USA	Ahmad Manning	2	0	2+0	0
14	DF	(United States) USA	Chad Marshall	1	0	1+0	0
-	FW	(United States) USA	Brett McNabb	1	0	1+0	0
-	MF	(South Korea) KOR	Seung Meang	1	0	0+1	0
-	FW	(Jamaica) JAM	Machel Millwood	1	0	0+1	0
5	MF	(United States) USA	Brandon Moss	7	0	7+0	0
-	DF	(Zimbabwe) ZIM	Thulani Ncube	2	0	2+0	0
10	FW	(Zimbabwe) ZIM	Joseph Ngwenya	3	0	1+2	0
-	FW	(United States) USA	Kevin Nugent	3	0	0+3	0
13	FW	(United States) USA	Dayton O'Brien	5	0	5+0	0
8	DF	(New Zealand) NZL	Duncan Oughton	2	0	2+0	0
29	GK	(United States) USA	Noah Palmer	3	0	1+2	0
-	MF	(United States) USA	Jeremy Parkins	1	0	0+1	0
-	DF	(United States) USA	Anthony Peters	1	0	0+1	0
27	GK	(United States) USA	Dan Popik	0	0	0+0	0
15	MF	(Mexico) MEX	José Retiz	4	0	4+0	0
22	FW	(Chile) CHI	Sebastián Rozental	2	1	2+0	1
-	DF	(United States) USA	Matt Schmidt	1	0	0+1	0
7	MF	(United States) USA	Jacob Thomas	1	0	1+0	0
-	DF	(United States) USA	Jake Traeger	3	0	0+3	0
30	MF	(United States) USA	Eric Vasquez	12	2	10+2	2
25	MF	(Brazil) BRA	Ricardo Virtuoso	2	0	2+0	0
20	DF	(United States) USA	Tim Ward	8	0	8+0	0
-	FW	(United States) USA	Cam Weaver	1	1	0+1	1
-	MF	(United States) USA	Kyle Widder	1	0	0+1	0
11	FW	(United States) USA	John Wolyniec	3	0	3+0	0
			Own goal	0	0	-	0

=== Disciplinary record ===
No.	Pos.	Name	MLS Reserve League		Total	
No.	Pos.	Name	Booked	Sent off (straight red)	Booked	Sent off (straight red)
-	MF	(United States) Trey Alexander	0	0	0	0
19	FW	(Mexico) Ivan Becerra	0	0	0	0
21	MF	(Croatia) Leonard Bisaku	1	0	1	0
-	MF	(United States) Milton Blanco	0	0	0	0
-	MF	(Bulgaria) Lubomir Bogdanov	0	0	0	0
-	FW	(Sierra Leone) Sallieu Bundu	0	0	0	0
13	FW	(United States) Marc Burch	3	0	3	0
18	FW	(United States) Knox Cameron	1	0	1	0
99	FW	(United States) Ryan Coiner	0	0	0	0
-	DF	(United States) Rene Corona	0	0	0	0
-	FW	(United States) Brian Cvilikas	0	0	0	0
-	GK	(United States) Peter Dzubay	0	0	0	0
9	FW	(United States) Jason Garey	0	0	0	0
31	GK	(Puerto Rico) Bill Gaudette	0	0	0	0
12	MF	(United States) Eddie Gaven	0	0	0	0
6	DF	(Chile) Marcos González	0	0	0	0
11	MF	(United States) Ned Grabavoy	0	0	0	0
28	GK	(United States) Andy Gruenebaum	0	0	0	0
29	FW	(United States) Duke Hashimoto	0	0	0	0
23	DF	(United States) Ezra Hendrickson	0	0	0	0
27	GK	(United States) Dominik Jakubek	0	0	0	0
-	GK	(United States) Jordan James	0	0	0	0
-	MF	(Kuwait) Nowaf Jaman	0	0	0	0
16	FW	(Sierra Leone) Kei Kamara	1	0	1	0
-	FW	(United States) Gus Kartes	0	0	0	0
-	DF	(England) Joel Kitamirike	2	1	2	1
3	DF	(United States) Ritchie Kotschau	1	0	1	0
-	DF	(Puerto Rico) John Krause	0	0	0	0
33	DF	(United States) Chris Leitch	0	0	0	0
-	MF	(United States) Ahmad Manning	0	0	0	0
-	DF	(United States) Chad Marshall	0	0	0	0
-	FW	(United States) Brett McNabb	0	0	0	0
-	MF	(South Korea) Seung Meang	0	0	0	0
-	FW	(Jamaica) Machel Millwood	0	0	0	0
5	MF	(United States) Brandon Moss	1	0	1	0
-	DF	(Zimbabwe) Thulani Ncube	0	0	0	0
10	FW	(Zimbabwe) Joseph Ngwenya	0	0	0	0
-	FW	(United States) Kevin Nugent	0	0	0	0
13	FW	(United States) Dayton O'Brien	0	0	0	0
8	DF	(New Zealand) Duncan Oughton	0	0	0	0
29	GK	(United States) Noah Palmer	0	0	0	0
-	MF	(United States) Jeremy Parkins	0	0	0	0
-	DF	(United States) Anthony Peters	0	0	0	0
27	GK	(United States) Dan Popik	0	0	0	0
15	MF	(Mexico) José Retiz	0	0	0	0
22	FW	(Chile) Sebastián Rozental	0	0	0	0
-	DF	(United States) Matt Schmidt	0	0	0	0
7	MF	(United States) Jacob Thomas	0	0	0	0
-	DF	(United States) Jake Traeger	0	0	0	0
30	MF	(United States) Eric Vasquez	0	0	0	0
25	MF	(Brazil) Ricardo Virtuoso	0	0	0	0
20	DF	(United States) Tim Ward	1	0	1	0
-	FW	(United States) Cam Weaver	1	0	1	0
-	MF	(United States) Kyle Widder	0	0	0	0
11	FW	(United States) John Wolyniec	0	0	0	0

=== Clean sheets ===
No.	Name	MLS Reserve League	Total	Games Played
-	(United States) Peter Dzubay	0	0	0
31	(United States) Bill Gaudette	1	1	2
28	(United States) Andy Gruenebaum	1	1	9
27	(Puerto Rico) Dominik Jakubek	0	0	2
-	(United States) Jordan James	0	0	0
29	(United States) Noah Palmer	0	0	3
27	(United States) Dan Popik	0	0	0

== Transfers ==
=== In ===
Pos.	Player	Transferred from	Fee/notes	Date	Source
DF	(Chile) Marcos González	(Chile) Club Deportivo Palestino		January 11, 2006	
DF	(England) Joel Kitamirike	(Scotland) Dundee F.C.		January 11, 2006	
DF	(United States) Tim Ward	(United States) NY/NJ MetroStars	Traded for Chris Henderson. Signed to a developmental contract.	January 12, 2006	
FW	(Chile) Sebastián Rozental	Puerto Rico Islanders		January 13, 2006	
FW	(United States) Jason Garey	(United States) Maryland Terrapins	Drafted in round 1 of the 2006 MLS SuperDraft	January 20, 2006	
FW	(Sierra Leone) Kei Kamara	(United States) Cal State Dominguez Hills Toros	Drafted in round 1 of the 2006 MLS SuperDraft. Signed to a developmental contract.	January 20, 2006	
DF	(United States) Jed Zayner	(United States) Indiana Hoosiers	Drafted in round 2 of the 2006 MLS SuperDraft. Signed to a developmental contract.	January 20, 2006	
MF	(United States) Brandon Moss	(United States) New Mexico Lobos	Drafted in round 3 of the 2006 MLS SuperDraft. Signed to a developmental contract.	January 20, 2006	
FW	(United States) Dayton O'Brien	(United States) Memphis Tigers	Drafted in round 3 of the 2006 MLS SuperDraft	January 20, 2006	
FW	(United States) Duke Hashimoto	(United States) SMU Mustangs	Drafted in round 4 of the 2006 MLS SuperDraft	January 20, 2006	
GK	(United States) Andy Gruenebaum	(United States) Kentucky Wildcats	Drafted in round 1 of the 2006 MLS Supplemental Draft. Signed to a developmental contract.	January 26, 2006	
FW	(Mexico) Ivan Becerra	(United States) UC Santa Barbara Gauchos	Drafted in round 3 of the 2006 MLS Supplemental Draft	January 26, 2006	
DF	(United States) Rusty Pierce	(United States) Real Salt Lake	Traded for a third round draft pick in the 2007 MLS Supplemental Draft	February 22, 2006	
MF	(Mexico) José Retiz	(Mexico) Club Puebla		March 21, 2006	
MF	(United States) Eddie Gaven	(United States) NY/NJ MetroStars	Traded with the rights for Chris Leitch for Edson Buddle	March 28, 2006	
MF	(United States) Jacob Thomas	(Germany) VfB Lübeck		March 28, 2006	
MF	(Croatia) Leonard Bisaku	(Bosnia and Herzegovina) HŠK Posušje		April 4, 2006	
DF	(Saint Vincent and the Grenadines) Ezra Hendrickson	(United States) Chivas USA	Traded for a third round draft pick in the 2007 MLS SuperDraft	April 28, 2006	
DF	(United States) Chris Leitch	(United States) NY/NJ MetroStars		April 28, 2006	
FW	(Zimbabwe) Joseph Ngwenya	(United States) Los Angeles Galaxy	Traded with Ned Grabavoy for Kyle Martino and John Wolyniec	May 12, 2006	
MF	(United States) Ned Grabavoy	(United States) Los Angeles Galaxy	Traded with Joseph Ngwenya for Kyle Martino and John Wolyniec. Signed to a developmental contract.	May 12, 2006	
GK	(United States) Noah Palmer	(United States) Real Salt Lake	Traded for a first round draft pick in the 2007 MLS Supplemental Draft and the rights to Duke Hashimoto	May 24, 2006	
MF	(Brazil) Ricardo Virtuoso	(Switzerland) FC Chiasso		May 28, 2006	
FW	(United States) Marc Burch	(United States) Los Angeles Galaxy	Traded for a second round draft pick in the 2007 MLS Supplemental Draft. Signed to a developmental contract.	July 11, 2006	
FW	(United States) Ryan Coiner	(Germany) Holstein Kiel		July 13, 2006	
DF	(New Zealand) Duncan Oughton	(United States) Columbus Crew		August 18, 2006	
DF	(United States) Danny O'Rourke	(United States) Toronto FC	Traded with William Hesmer for a partial allocation	November 17, 2006	
GK	(United States) William Hesmer	(United States) Toronto FC	Traded with Danny O'Rourke for a partial allocation	November 17, 2006	

=== Loan in ===
Pos.	Player	Parent club	Length/Notes	Beginning	End	Source
GK	(United States) Dan Popik	(United States) MLS Pool	Short term agreement	May 31, 2006	June 10, 2006	
GK	(United States) Dominik Jakubek	(United States) MLS Pool	Short term agreement	June 18, 2006	July 9, 2006	

=== Out ===
Pos.	Player	Transferred to	Fee/notes	Date	Source
DF	(New Zealand) Simon Elliott	(England) Fulham F.C.	The Crew retains his MLS rights	January 6, 2006	
MF	(United States) Chris Henderson	(United States) NY/NJ MetroStars	Traded for Tim Ward	January 12, 2006	
DF	(United States) Chris Wingert	(United States) Colorado Rapids	Traded for a fourth round draft pick in the 2007 MLS SuperDraft	January 20, 2006	
GK	(United States) Matt Jordan	(United States) Colorado Rapids	Traded for a third round draft pick in the 2006 MLS SuperDraft	January 20, 2006	
MF	(United States) Marcus Storey	(United States) Houston Dynamo	Traded for a second round draft pick in the 2007 MLS SuperDraft	February 16, 2006	
FW	(United States) David Testo	(Canada) Vancouver Whitecaps	Placed on waivers	March 3, 2006	
FW	(United States) Jamal Sutton	(United States) Seattle Sounders	Placed on waivers	March 3, 2006	
MF	(Panama) Luis Gallardo	(Costa Rica) A.D. Municipal Pérez Zeledón	Placed on waivers	March 3, 2006	
DF	(United States) Stephen Herdsman	Retired	Placed on waivers	March 3, 2006	
MF	(United States) Domenic Mediate	(United States) D.C. United	Traded for a fourth round draft pick in the 2007 MLS Supplemental Draft	March 14, 2006	
FW	(United States) Edson Buddle	(United States) New York Red Bulls	Traded for the rights to Chris Leitch and Eddie Gaven	March 28, 2006	
DF	(England) Joel Kitamirike	(England) Fisher Athletic F.C.	Placed on waivers	April 27, 2006	
MF	(United States) Kyle Martino	(United States) Los Angeles Galaxy	Traded with John Wolyniec for Ned Grabavoy and Joseph Ngwenya	May 12, 2006	
FW	(United States) John Wolyniec	(United States) Los Angeles Galaxy	Traded with Kyle Martino for Ned Grabavoy and Joseph Ngwenya	May 12, 2006	
DF	(New Zealand) Duncan Oughton	(United States) Columbus Crew	Placed on waivers	May 12, 2006	
FW	(United States) Duke Hashimoto	(United States) Real Salt Lake	Rights traded with a first round draft pick in the 2007 MLS Supplemental Draft for Noah Palmer	May 24, 2006	
MF	(United States) Dayton O'Brien	(United States) Atlanta Silverbacks	Placed on waivers	July 11, 2006	
MF	(Croatia) Leonard Bisaku	Retired		August 18, 2006	
DF	(United States) Ritchie Kotschau	(Canada) Toronto FC	Selected ninth in the 2006 MLS Expansion Draft	November 17, 2006	
GK	(United States) Noah Palmer	Retired	Placed on waivers	November, 2006	
MF	(United States) Eric Vasquez	(United States) Miami FC	Placed on waivers	November, 2006	
FW	(United States) Knox Cameron	(United States) Canton Celtic	Contract expired	December 31, 2006	
FW	(Chile) Sebastián Rozental	(Israel) Maccabi Petah Tikva F.C.	Contract expired	December 31, 2006	

=== MLS Draft picks ===
Draft picks are not automatically signed to the team roster. Only those who are signed to a contract will be listed as transfers in. The picks for the Columbus Crew are listed below:

2006 Columbus Crew SuperDraft Picks
Round	Pick	Player	Position	College
1	3	(United States) Jason Garey	FW	Maryland
1	9	(United States) Kei Kamara	FW	Cal State Dominguez Hills
2	13	(United States) Jed Zayner	DF	Indiana
3	27	(United States) Brandon Moss	MF	New Mexico
3	33	(United States) Dayton O'Brien	FW	Memphis
4	38	(United States) Duke Hashimoto	FW	SMU

2006 Columbus Crew Supplemental Draft Picks
Round	Pick	Player	Position	College
1	3	(United States) Andy Gruenebaum	GK	Kentucky
2	15	(United States) David Chun	MF	SMU
3	27	(Mexico) Ivan Becerra	FW	UC Santa Barbara

== Awards ==
=== Postseason ===
MLS Athletic Trainer of the Year

- Rick Guter

=== Crew Team Awards ===
- Most Valuable Player – Marcos González
- Defensive Player of the Year – Marcos González
- Scoring Champion – Jason Garey & Joseph Ngwenya
- Man of the Year – Ritchie Kotschau
- Coach's Award – Ezra Hendrickson
- Newcomer of the Year – Jason Garey
- Goal of the Year – Joseph Ngwenya
- Humanitarian of the Year – Jed Zayner
- Hardest Working Man of the Year – Jacob Thomas
- Comeback Player of the Year – Duncan Oughton
- Fan of the Year – Kelly Brooks
