= 2007 MLS supplemental draft =

College draft for soccer teams

The 2007 MLS supplemental draft was held on January 18, 2007, following the SuperDraft (held on January 12, 2007), as teams filled out their developmental rosters.

== Changes from 2006 ==
- 2007 expansion club Toronto FC received the first pick in each round.

== Round 1 ==
Pick #	MLS team	Player	Position	Affiliation
1	Toronto FC	(New Zealand) Jarrod Smith	F	West Virginia
2	Chivas USA (Note: #2: Pick originally belonged to Columbus Crew → Real Salt Lake. → Chivas USA....On 24 May 2006, Real Salt Lake had acquired this first-round pick and forward Duke Hashimoto from Columbus Crew in exchange for goalkeeper Noah Palmer. More information needed.)	(United States) Desmond Brooks	D	Saint Mary's
3	Kansas City Wizards	(United States) Aaron Hohlbein	M/D	Wisconsin
4	Colorado Rapids (Note: #4: Real Salt Lake → Colorado Rapids. 29 June 2005: Colorado Rapids acquired this first-round selection and a permanent international roster spot from Real Salt Lake in exchange for midfielder Adolfo Gregorio.)	(United States) John DiRaimondo	M	St. Louis
5	Los Angeles Galaxy	(El Salvador) Steve Purdy	D	California
6	New York Red Bulls	(Trinidad and Tobago) Randi Patterson	F	UNC - Greensboro
7	Chicago Fire (Note: #7: Chivas USA → Chicago Fire. 24 January 2006: Chicago Fire acquired this first-round selection from Chivas USA in exchange for defender Jesse Marsch.)	(United States) Nick Noble	GK	West Virginia
8	Chicago Fire	(United States) Mark Totten	M	James Madison
9	FC Dallas	(Liberia) Sandi Gbandi	M	UAB
10	Los Angeles Galaxy (Note: #10: Colorado Rapids → Los Angeles Galaxy. 8 February 2006: Los Angeles Galaxy acquired this first-round selection from Colorado Rapids in exchange for forward Aaron King.)	(United States) Gordon Kljestan	D	Seton Hall
11	D.C. United	(United States) Shawn Crowe	GK	Florida International
12	New England Revolution	(United States) Phil Marfuggi	GK	Clemson
13	Houston Dynamo	(United States) Nick Hatzke	M	California

== Round 2 ==
Pick #	MLS team	Player	Position	Affiliation
14	Toronto FC	(Trinidad and Tobago) Darryl Roberts	F	Liberty
15	Columbus Crew	(United States) Ryan Junge	D	Creighton
16	Kansas City Wizards	(United States) Michael Todd	F	Hofstra
17	Real Salt Lake	(United States) Haddon Kirk	D	North Carolina State
18	Los Angeles Galaxy	(United States) Kevin Long	D	San Francisco
19	New York Red Bulls	(United States) Sal Caccavale	M	American
20	Chivas USA	(Mexico) Erasmo Solorzano	M	UC Riverside
21	Chicago Fire	(Trinidad and Tobago) Osei Telesford	D	Liberty
22	Los Angeles Galaxy (Note: #22: FC Dallas → Los Angeles Galaxy. 19 July 2006: Los Angeles Galaxy acquired this second-round selection from FC Dallas in exchange for midfielder Marcelo Saragosa.)	(United States) Zach Kirby	D	Boston University
23	Columbus Crew (Note: #23: Colorado Rapids → Columbus Crew. 9 March 2005: Columbus Crew acquired this second-round selection from Colorado Rapids in exchange for midfielder Martín Morales and forward Luchi Gonzalez.)	(Croatia) Tonci Skroce	M	University of Illinois at Chicago
24	Chivas USA (Note: #24: D.C. United → Chivas USA. 8 March 2005: Chivas USA acquired this second-round selection from D.C. United in exchange for forward Jamil Walker.)	(United States) Raul Batista	M	San Diego State
25	New England Revolution	(United States) Gary Flood	D	Hofstra
26	Los Angeles Galaxy (Note: #26: Houston Dynamo → Columbus Crew → Los Angeles Galaxy. 11 July 2006: Los Angeles Galaxy acquired this second-round selection from Columbus Crew in exchange for forward Marc Burch. On 16 February 2006, Columbus had acquired this second-round pick from Houston Dynamo in exchange for midfielder Marcus Storey.)	(United States) Taylor Canel	M/F	California State-Northridge

== Round 3 ==
Pick #	MLS team	Player	Position	Affiliation
27	Toronto FC	(United States) Hunter West	F	South Florida
28	Real Salt Lake (Note: #28: Columbus Crew → Real Salt Lake. 22 February 2006: Real Salt Lake acquired this third-round selection from Columbus Crew in exchange for defender Rusty Pierce.)	(United States) Jared Kent	M	Old Dominion
29	Kansas City Wizards	(United States) Chris Konopka	GK	Providence
30	Kansas City Wizards (Note: #30: Real Salt Lake → Kansas City Wizards. 17 November 2005: Kansas City Wizards acquired this third-round selection from Real Salt Lake in exchange for midfielder Diego Walsh.)	(Ghana) Eric Frimpong	M	UC Santa Barbara
31	Chivas USA (Note: #31: Los Angeles Galaxy → Chivas USA. 27 February 2006: Chivas USA acquired this third-round selection from Los Angeles Galaxy in exchange for defender Brian Dunseth.)	(United States) Anthony Hamilton	F	UC Irvine
32	Kansas City Wizards (Note: #32: New York Red Bulls → Kansas City Wizards. 11 January 2007: Kansas City Wizards acquired this third-round selection from New York Red Bulls in exchange for midfielder Dave van den Bergh.)	(United States) A. J. Godbolt	M	Maryland
33	Chivas USA	(United States) Lyle Martin	F	California State - Bakersfield
34	Chicago Fire	(United States) Asmir Pervan	F	Saint Leo
35	Colorado Rapids (Note: #35: FC Dallas → Colorado Rapids. 14 February 2006: Colorado acquired this pick and a third-round selection in the 2007 MLS SuperDraft from FC Dallas in exchange for the use of a Youth International slot in 2006.)	(Japan) Kosuke Kimura	M	Western Illinois
36	Colorado Rapids	(Canada) Riley O'Neill	F	Kentucky
37	D.C. United	(Ivory Coast) Guy-Roland Kpene	F	Dowling College
38	New England Revolution	(United States) Chris Loftus	F	Duke
39	Houston Dynamo	(United States) Erik Ustruck	M	Santa Clara

== Round 4 ==
Pick #	MLS team	Player	Position	Affiliation
40	Toronto FC	(Canada) Tyler Hemming	M	Hartwick College
41	Columbus Crew	(United States) Ted Niziolek	M	Seton Hall
42	Houston Dynamo (Note: '#42: Pick originally belonged to Kansas City Wizards. → Houston Dynamo.)	(United States) Justin Douglass	D	Missouri State
43	Real Salt Lake	(United States) Kyle Reynish	GK	UC Santa Barbara
44	Los Angeles Galaxy	(United States) Kiel McClung	D	UCLA
45	FC Dallas (Note: #45: New York Red Bulls → FC Dallas. 2 March 2006: FC Dallas acquired this fourth-round selection from New York Red Bulls in exchange for defender Steve Jolley.)	(United States) Chase Wileman	M	Southern Methodist
46	New York Red Bulls (Note: #46: Chivas USA → New York Red Bulls. 12 January 2007: New York Red Bulls acquired this fourth-round selection from Chivas USA in exchange for forward David Arvizu.)	(United States) Danny Cepero	GK	Pennsylvania
47	Chicago Fire	(United States) Daniel Woolard	D	Midwestern State
48	Kansas City Wizards (Note: #48: FC Dallas → Kansas City Wizards. 19 July 2006: Kansas City Wizards acquired this fourth-round selection from FC Dallas in exchange for forward Alex Smith.)	(United States) Michael Kraus	M/F	Creighton
49	Real Salt Lake (Note: #49: Colorado Rapids → Real Salt Lake. 15 August 2006: Real Salt Lake acquired this fourth-round selection from Colorado Rapids in exchange for forward Melvin Tarley.)	(United States) Dustin Kirby	D	Ohio State
50	Columbus Crew (Note: #50: D.C. United. → Columbus Crew. 14 March 2006: Columbus Crew acquired this fourth-round selection from D.C. United in exchange for defender Domenic Mediate.)	(United States) Kevin Burns	M	Connecticut
51	New England Revolution	PASS		
52	Kansas City Wizards (Note: '#52: Pick originally belonged to Houston Dynamo. → Kansas City Wizards.)	(United States) Willy Guadarrama	F	Campbell
