= Dominik Jakubek =

American soccer player (born 1979)

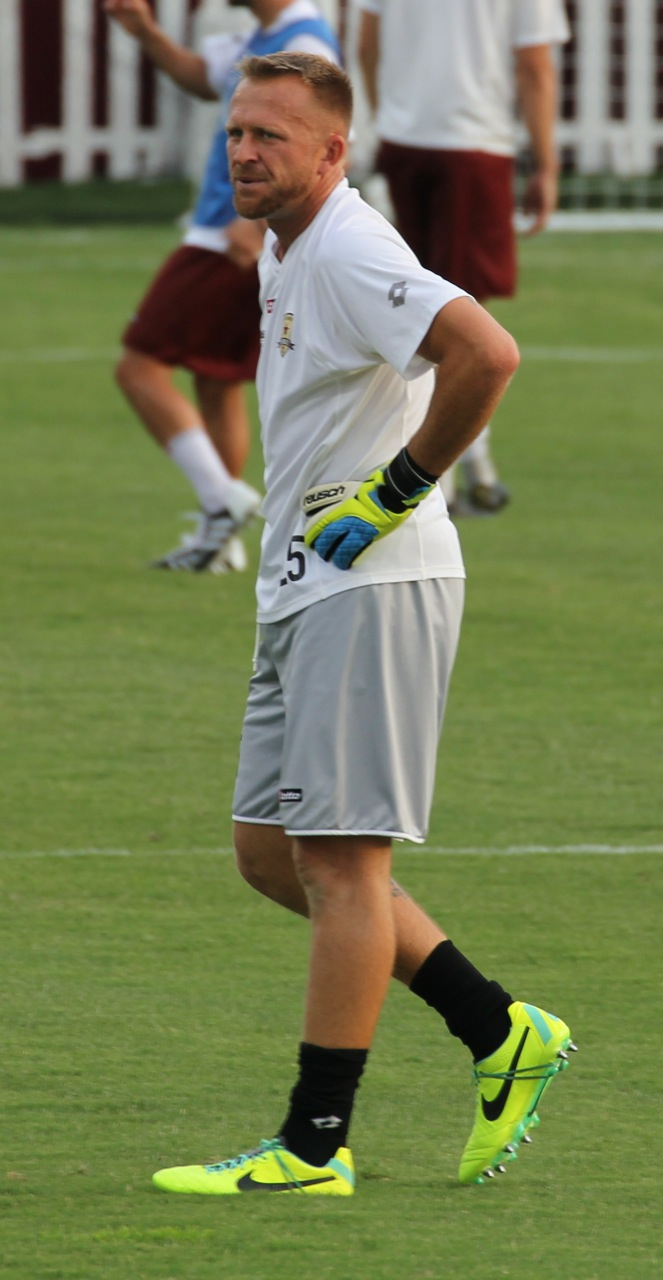

Personal information
- Full name: Dominik Jakubek
- Date of birth: September 2, 1979 (age 47)
- Place of birth: Santa Clara, California, United States
- Height: 6 ft 0 in (1.83 m)
- Position: Goalkeeper

College career
Years	Team	Apps	(Gls)
2000–2001	San Joaquin Delta Mustangs		
2002	Sonoma State Seawolves		
2003	Chico State Wildcats		

Senior career*
Years	Team	Apps	(Gls)
2004	Milwaukee Wave (indoor)	0	(0)
2004–2006	California Cougars (indoor)	28	(0)
2006	Columbus Crew	0	(0)
2007	California Victory	5	(0)
2010–2011	RKS Garbarnia		
2012	Los Angeles Blues	0	(0)
2014–2017	Sacramento Republic	43	(0)
2018	Oakland Stompers		
2019	Reno 1868	0	(0)
- * Club domestic league appearances and goals as of 23:18, October 20, 2017 (UTC)

Dominik Jakubek (born September 2, 1979) is an American soccer player who plays as a goalkeeper.

== College ==
Jakubek bounced around during his collegiate soccer career, spending time at San Joaquin Delta College and Sonoma State University before ending up at California State University, Chico. At Chico, he started every match of his senior season and helped lead the team to the NCAA Division II Championship match.

== MISL ==
He was drafted as the third overall pick of the Milwaukee Wave in the 2004 Major Indoor Soccer League Draft. He was then traded to the California Cougars where he would spend the next season and a half. He did not gain his first start until March 2006, when starter Jim Larkin was injured.

== MLS ==
In June 2006, the Columbus Crew's starting goalkeeper Jon Busch was injured and deemed out for the season. With backup goalkeepers Bill Gaudette and Jonny Walker already out with injuries, the Crew was forced to trade for Noah Palmer and sign emergency backups, including Jakubek.

== USL ==
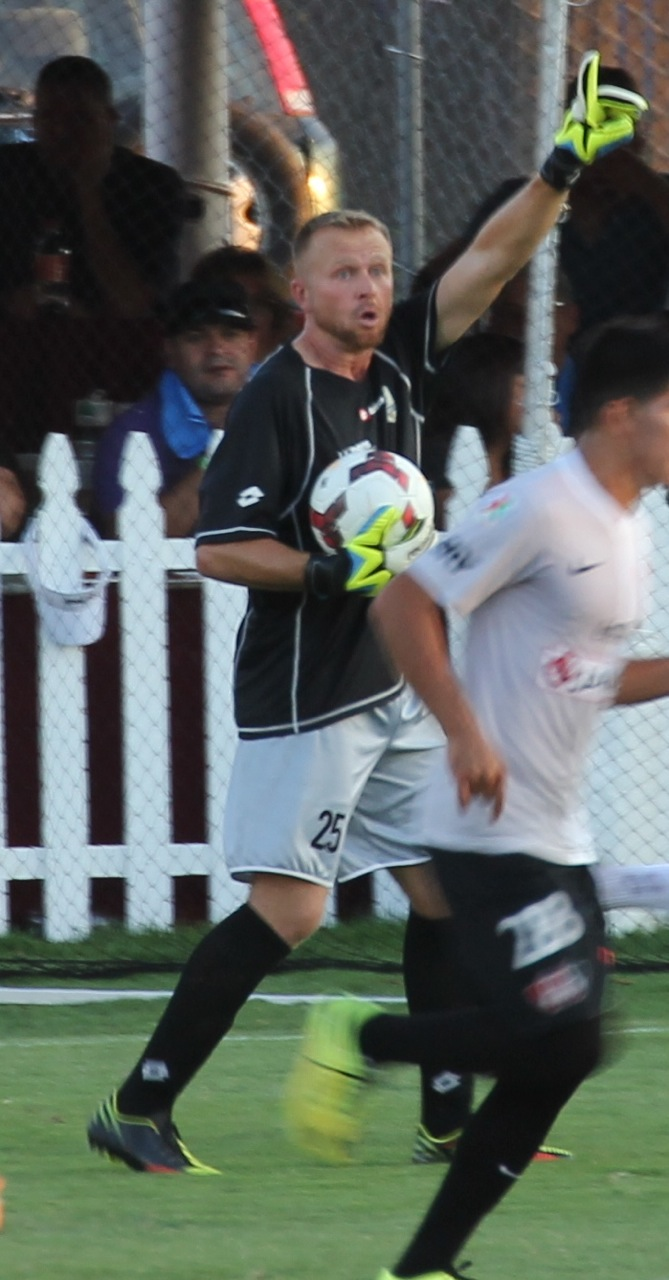
Jakubek playing for SRFC in a friendly match vs Atlas FC of Mexico

Jakubek was waived at the end of the 2006 season, and signed for USL-1 expansion franchise California Victory in early 2007, appearing five times for the team during the season.
