= Justin Moore (soccer) =

American soccer player

Personal information
- Full name: Justin Moore
- Date of birth: June 13, 1983 (age 43)
- Place of birth: Decatur, Georgia, United States
- Height: 6 ft 0 in (1.83 m)
- Position: Defender

Youth career
- 2002–2005: Clemson Tigers

Senior career*
Years	Team	Apps	(Gls)
2006	Augusta Fireball	1	(0)
2006	FC Dallas	2	(0)
2007–2008	Atlanta Silverbacks	45	(3)
2009	Atlanta Blackhawks	2	(0)
- * Club domestic league appearances and goals as of 1 October 2007

Justin Moore (born June 13, 1983) is an American soccer player who last played for the Atlanta Blackhawks of the USL Premier Development League.

Moore played college soccer at Clemson University from 2002 to 2005. He appeared in 78 games over four seasons, scoring 4 goals and assisting on 16. He also played for one season with Augusta Fireball in the USL Premier Development League.

He was drafted in the second round, 15th overall, of the 2006 MLS SuperDraft by FC Dallas. After signing a senior contract for the 2006 season, the club offered Moore a developmental contract for the 2007 season which he declined, and he signed for the Atlanta Silverbacks prior to the 2007 season.
