= José Retiz =

Mexican footballer (born 1979)

Personal information
- Date of birth: January 22, 1979 (age 47)
- Place of birth: Acapulco, Mexico
- Height: 6 ft 0 in (1.83 m)
- Position: Forward

Youth career
- 1998–1999: Rancho Santiago

Senior career*
Years	Team	Apps	(Gls)
2001	Southern California Seahorses	20	(9)
2001–2002	Santos Laguna	17	(14)
2003	Los Angeles Galaxy	5	(0)
2004	Puebla	54	(37)
2006	Columbus Crew	22	(1)
2007	California Victory	29	(17)
- * Club domestic league appearances and goals as of 7 March 2007 ‡ National team caps and goals as of 7 March 2007

José Retiz (born January 22, 1979) is a Mexican former professional footballer.

Retiz played college soccer for Rancho Santiago Junior College in Santa Ana, California. From 1998 to 1999, he scored 21 goals and 45 assists and played in 51 matches, helping Rancho Santiago to a 47-1-3 record in those two seasons.

He was originally drafted 29th overall by the Los Angeles Galaxy in the 2000 MLS SuperDraft but never joined the team. He spent the 2001 and 2002 season with Mexican side Santos Laguna on their reserve team. In 2001, he also played for the Southern California Seahorses of the USL PDL. He returned to the Galaxy in 2003 as a non-roster invitee and appeared as a substitute in five games. In 2004, he trained with Puebla F.C. He returned to the MLS on March 21, 2006, when he signed with the Columbus Crew.

Retiz played 22 games in 2006 for the injury-ravaged Crew, before being released by the team in February 2007. He subsequently signed for the USL-1 expansion franchise California Victory.
