= 2006 MLS SuperDraft =

College draft for soccer teams

General information
- Sport: Soccer
- Date: January 20, 2006
- Time: 12:00pm (ET)
- Location: Philadelphia
- Network: Fox Soccer Channel

Overview
- 48 total selections
- First selection: Marvell Wynne, MetroStars
- Most selections: FC Dallas (7 selections)
- Fewest selections: Chivas USA; Colorado Rapids; Real Salt Lake (2 selections)

The 2006 MLS SuperDraft, held in Philadelphia on January 20, 2006, was the seventh incarnation of the annual Major League Soccer SuperDraft. The first selection originally belonged to Chivas USA, but they traded it to the MetroStars for the fifth overall selection and Jason Hernandez. The MetroStars then drafted Marvell Wynne. The draft was followed by the 2006 MLS Supplemental Draft.

The draft has produced multiple United States men's national soccer team players, including Sacha Kljestan, Jozy Altidore (2nd round), and Jonathan Bornstein (4th round).

== Player selection ==
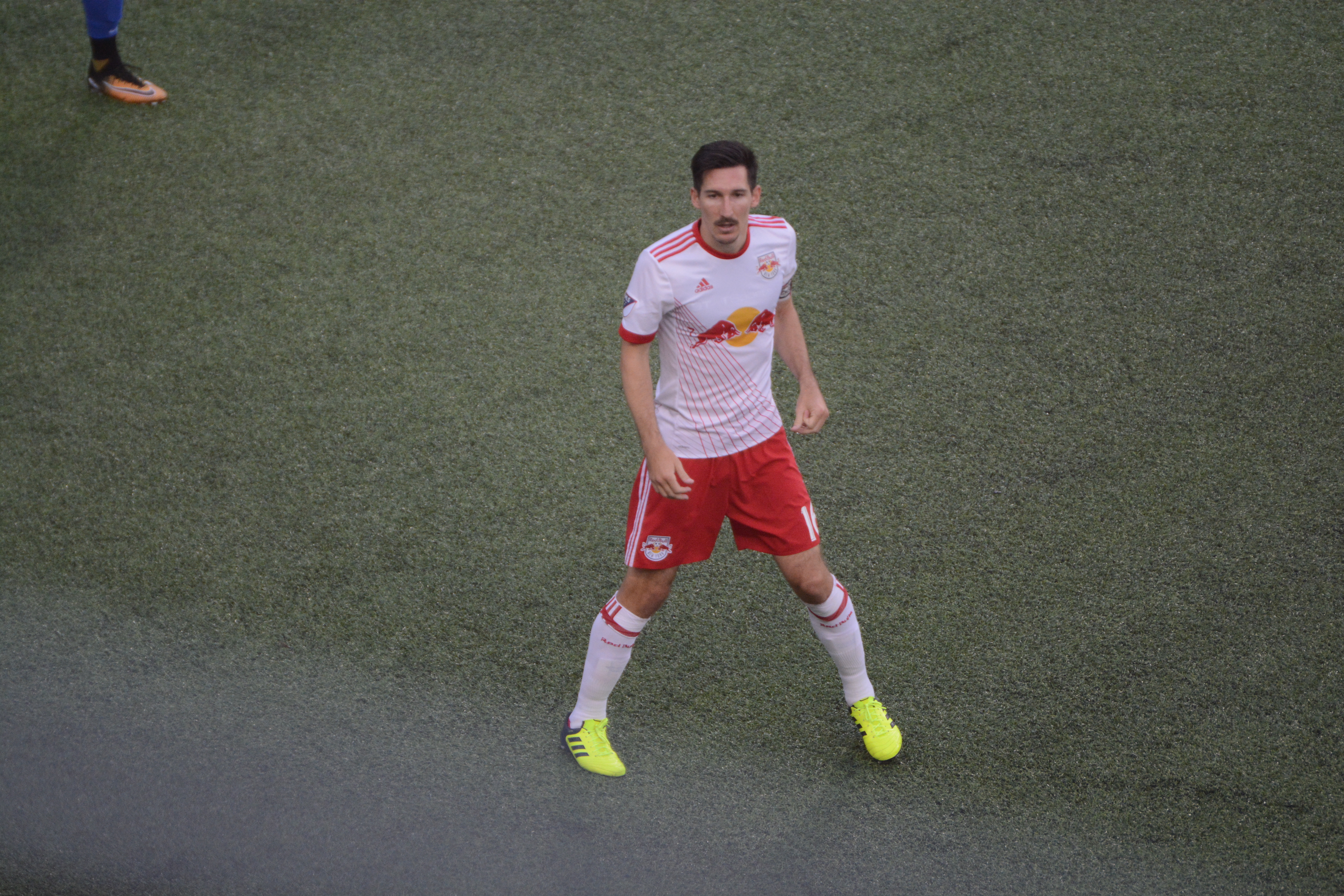
Chivas USA selected Sacha Kljestan 5th overall. The 2016 MLS All-Star is a 2x MLS Best XI selection and earned 52 caps with the U.S. men's national team.

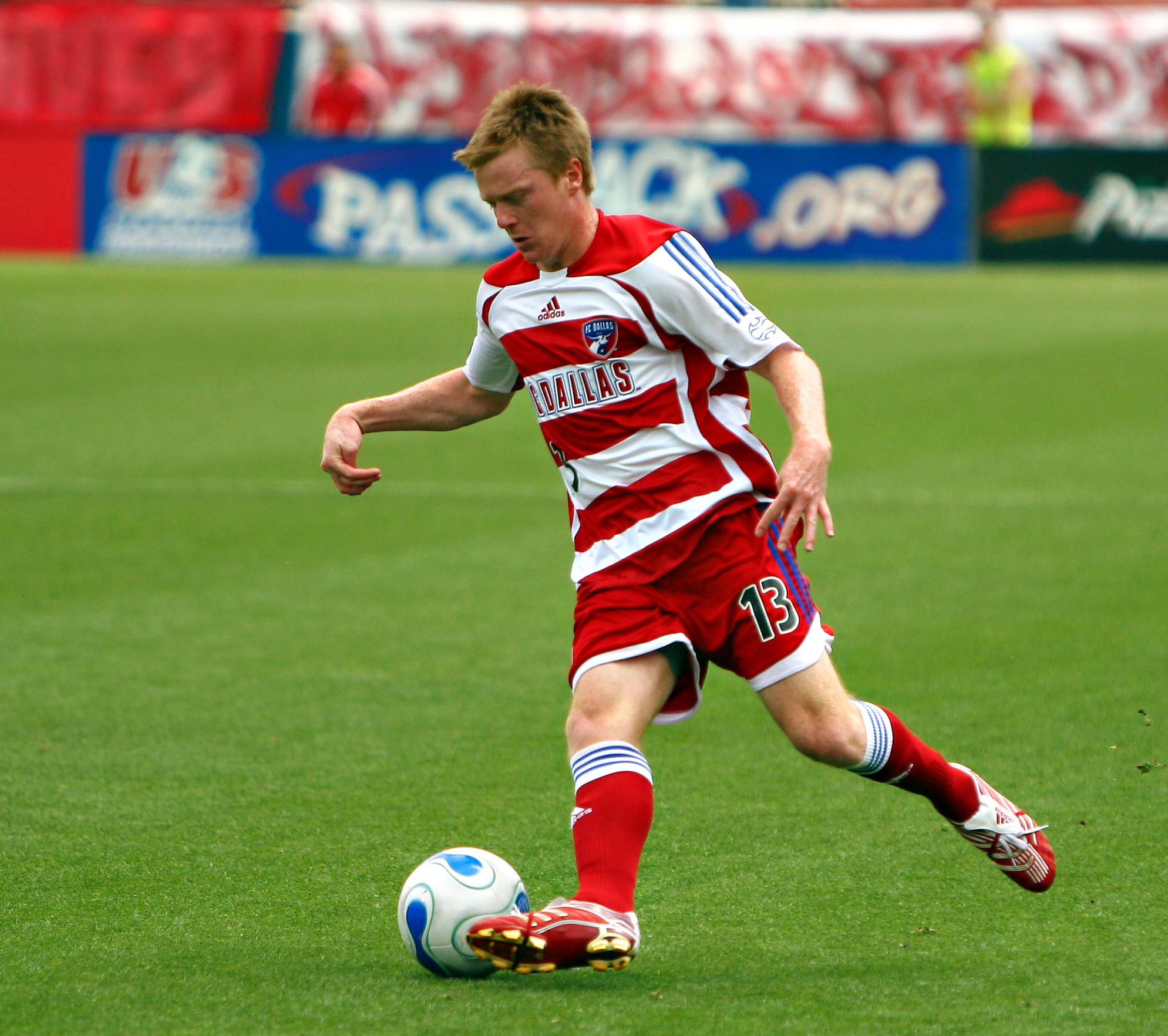
FC Dallas selected Dax McCarty 6th overall. He is a 2x MLS All-Star, a 2015 MLS Best XI selection and a member of the 400 games played club. He earned 13 caps with the U.S. national team.

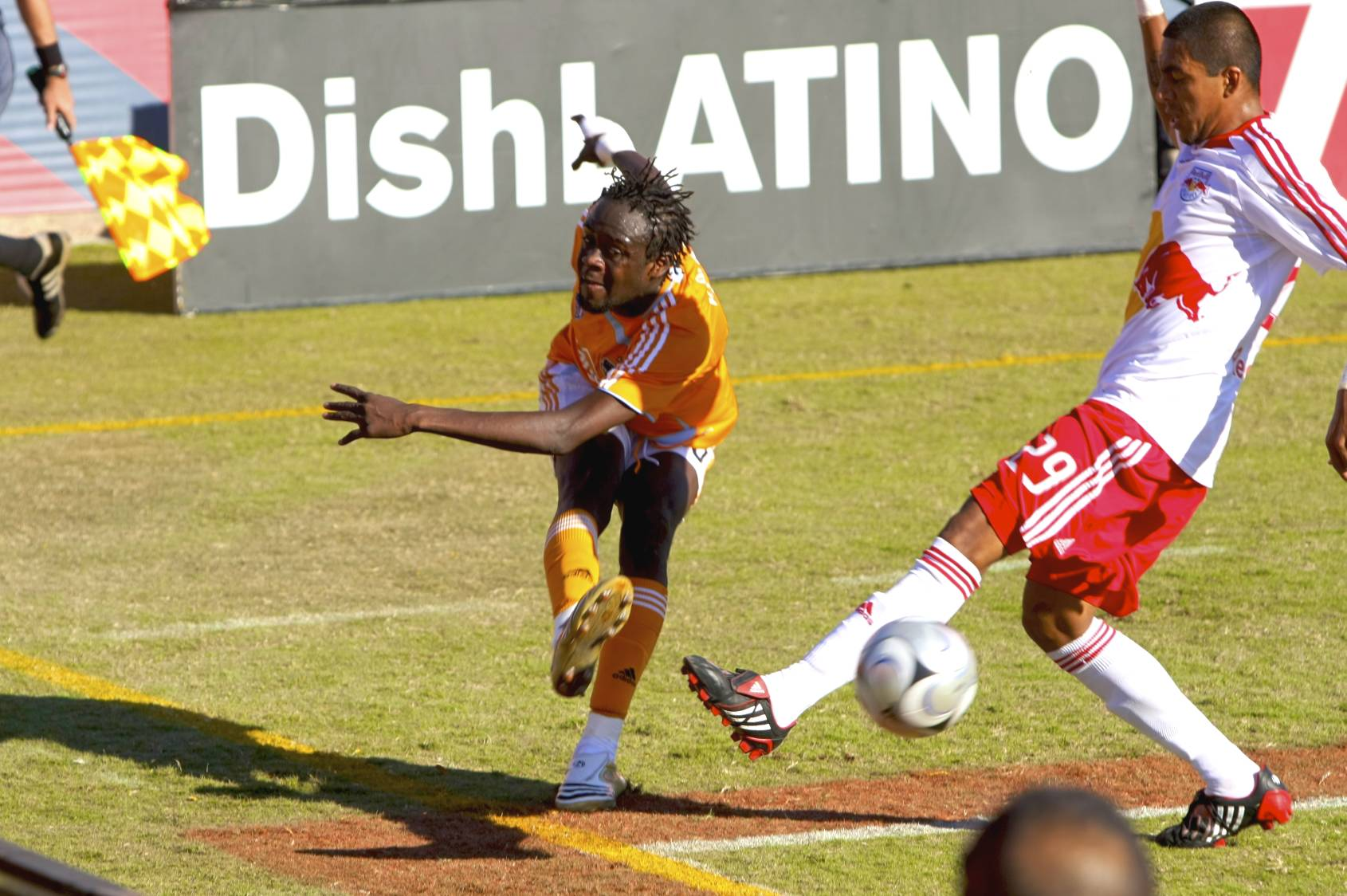
The Columbus Crew selected Kei Kamara 9th overall. The 2x MLS All-Star is a 2015 MLS Best XI selection and won the 2015 MLS Humanitarian of the Year. He is a member of both the 100 goals club and 400 games played club. He's earned 39 caps for the Sierra Leone national team leading them to the 2021 Africa Cup of Nations.

Key

*	Denotes a player contracted under the Generation Adidas program
^	Denotes player who has been selected to an MLS All-Star Game
§	Denotes a player who won the MLS Rookie of the Year
†	Denotes player who has been selected for an MLS Best XI team
~	Denotes a player who won the MLS MVP

=== Round one ===
Pick #	MLS Team	Player	Position	Affiliation
1	MetroStars (Note: #1: Chivas USA → MetroStars. 2006-01-20: MetroStars acquired this pick from Chivas USA in exchange for the #5 pick and defender Jason Hernandez.)	(United States) Marvell Wynne*	D	UCLA
2	Real Salt Lake	(Morocco) Mehdi Ballouchy	M	Santa Clara
3	Columbus Crew	(United States) Jason Garey	F	Maryland
4	Kansas City Wizards	(Armenia) Yura Movsisyan*	F	Pasadena City College
5	Chivas USA (Note: #5: MetroStars → Chivas USA. 2006-01-20: Chivas USA acquired this pick and defender Jason Hernandez from MetroStars in exchange for the #1 pick.)	(United States) Sacha Kljestan*^†	M	Seton Hall
6	FC Dallas	(United States) Dax McCarty*^†	M	North Carolina
7	D.C. United	(United States) Justin Moose	M	Wake Forest
8	Houston Dynamo	(United States) Patrick Ianni*	D	UCLA
9	Columbus Crew (Note: #9: Colorado Rapids → Columbus Crew. 2005-01-14: Columbus acquired this pick from Colorado in exchange for forward Jeff Cunningham.)	(Sierra Leone) Kei Kamara*^†	F	Cal State Dominguez Hills
10	Chicago Fire	(United States) Calen Carr	F	California
11	New England Revolution	(Brazil) Leandro de Oliveira	M	UAB
12	Los Angeles Galaxy	(United States) Nathan Sturgis*	D/M	Clemson

=== Round two ===
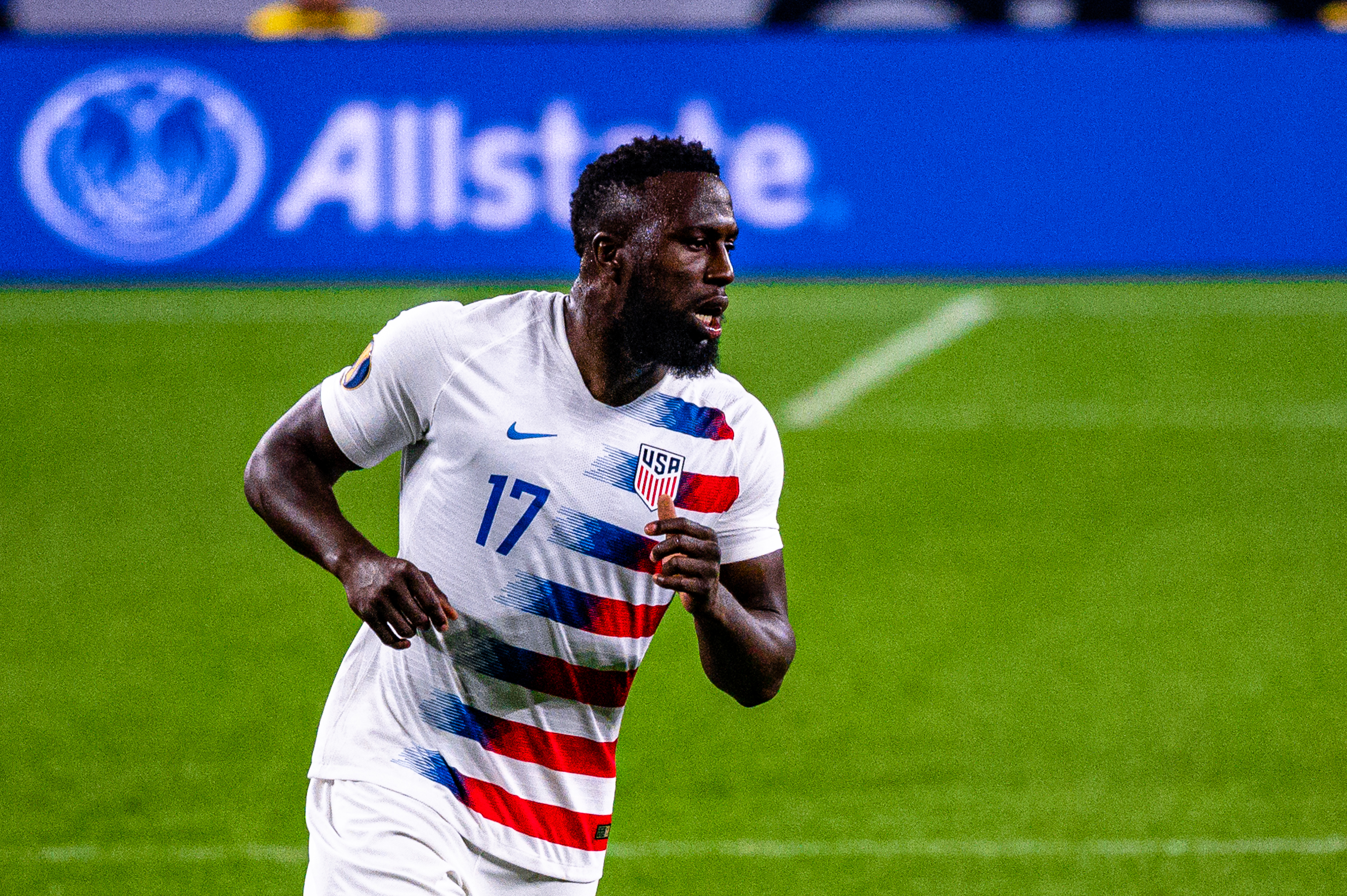
The MetroStars selected 2x MLS All-Star Jozy Altidore 17th overall. Altidore earned 115 caps with the U.S. men's national team and was named to the 2010 and 2014 FIFA World Cup squads.

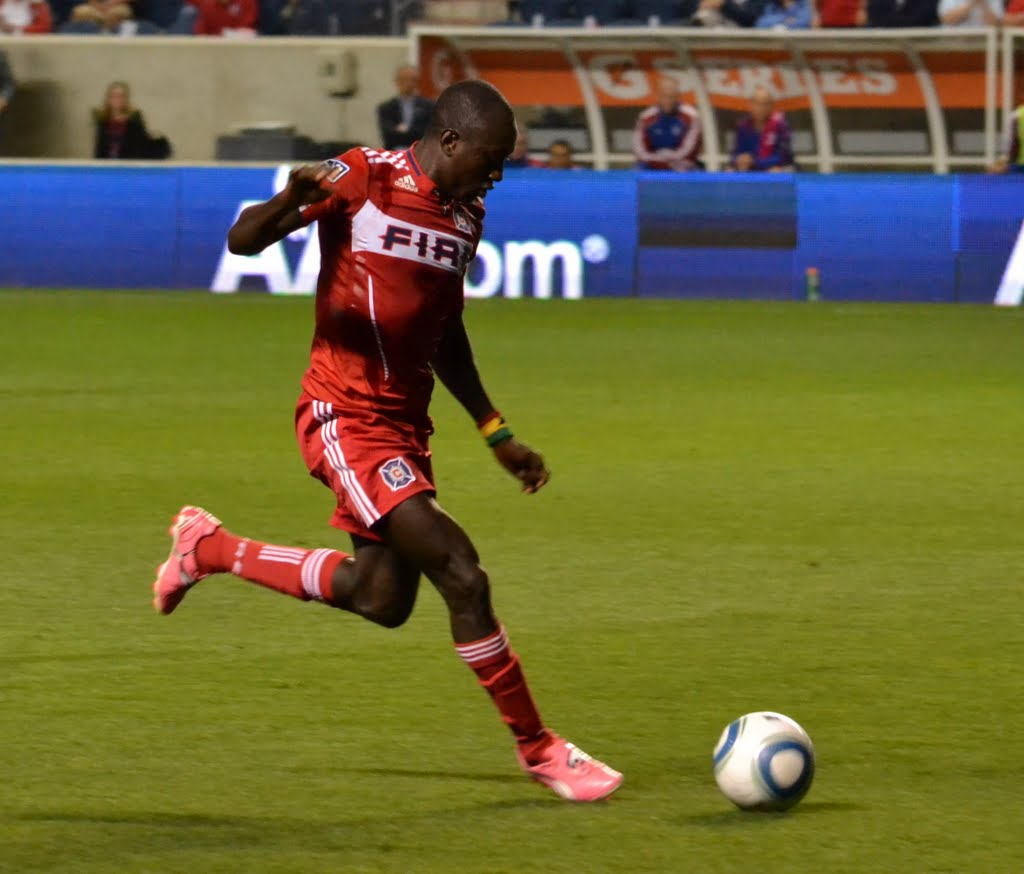
FC Dallas selected Dominic Oduro 22nd overall. in 13 seasons, he would play in over 300 MLS games.

Pick #	MLS Team	Player	Position	Affiliation
13	Columbus Crew (Note: #13: Chivas USA → New England Revolution → Columbus Crew. 2006-01-20: Columbus acquired this pick and a third-round selection in the 2007 MLS SuperDraft from New England in exchange for an allocation. New England had acquired this pick (originally a conditional pick) and the traded third-round 2007 selection from Chivas USA in exchange for salary considerations on 2005-09-10.)	(United States) Jed Zayner*	D	Indiana
14	Chicago Fire (Note: #14: Real Salt Lake → Chicago Fire. 2005-01-03: Chicago acquired this pick and a third-round selection in the 2005 MLS SuperDraft from Real Salt Lake in exchange for defender Evan Whitfield and forward Dipsy Selolwane.)	(United States) Jeff Curtin	D	Georgetown
15	FC Dallas (Note: #15: Columbus Crew → FC Dallas. 2005-04-26: FC Dallas acquired this pick and a youth international slot for the 2005 season from Columbus in exchange for forward Cornell Glen.)	(United States) Justin Moore	M	Clemson
16	Kansas City Wizards	(United States) Lance Watson	M	New Mexico
17	MetroStars (Note: #17: MetroStars → Real Salt Lake → MetroStars. 2005-02-01: MetroStars acquired this pick and an allocation from Real Salt Lake in exchange for defender Eddie Pope. MetroStars had the choice of swapping first-round selections in the 2005 MLS Supplemental Draft with Real Salt Lake or taking the highest RSL second-round 2006 SuperDraft selection. MetroStars chose the latter. Real Salt Lake had previously acquired this pick from MetroStars in exchange for use of a youth international slot for the 2005 season on 2005-01-14.)	(United States) Jozy Altidore*^	F	Generation adidas
18	FC Dallas	(United States) Blake Wagner*	D/M	Generation adidas
19	Kansas City Wizards (Note: #19: D.C. United → Chicago Fire → Kansas City Wizards. 2006-01-11: Kansas City acquired this pick and midfielder Will John from Chicago in exchange for midfielder Diego Gutiérrez. Chicago had acquired this pick from D.C. United in exchange for a third-round selection in the 2005 MLS SuperDraft on 2005-01-14.)	(United States) Tyson Wahl	D	California
20	Chicago Fire (Note: #20: Houston Dynamo → Chicago Fire. 2005-06-14: Chicago acquired this pick from San Jose in exchange for defender Kelly Gray. The San Jose franchise moved to Houston after the 2005 MLS season.)	(United States) Brian Plotkin	M	Indiana
21	Colorado Rapids	(United States) Jacob Peterson*	F	Indiana
22	FC Dallas (Note: #22: Chicago Fire → FC Dallas. 2005-01-14: FC Dallas acquired this pick and goalkeeper Henry Ring from Chicago in exchange for a third-round selection in the 2005 MLS SuperDraft.)	(Ghana) Dominic Oduro	F	VCU
23	New England Revolution	(Guatemala) Willie Sims*	F	Cal State Northridge
24	Los Angeles Galaxy	(United States) Marc Burch	D	Maryland

=== Round three ===
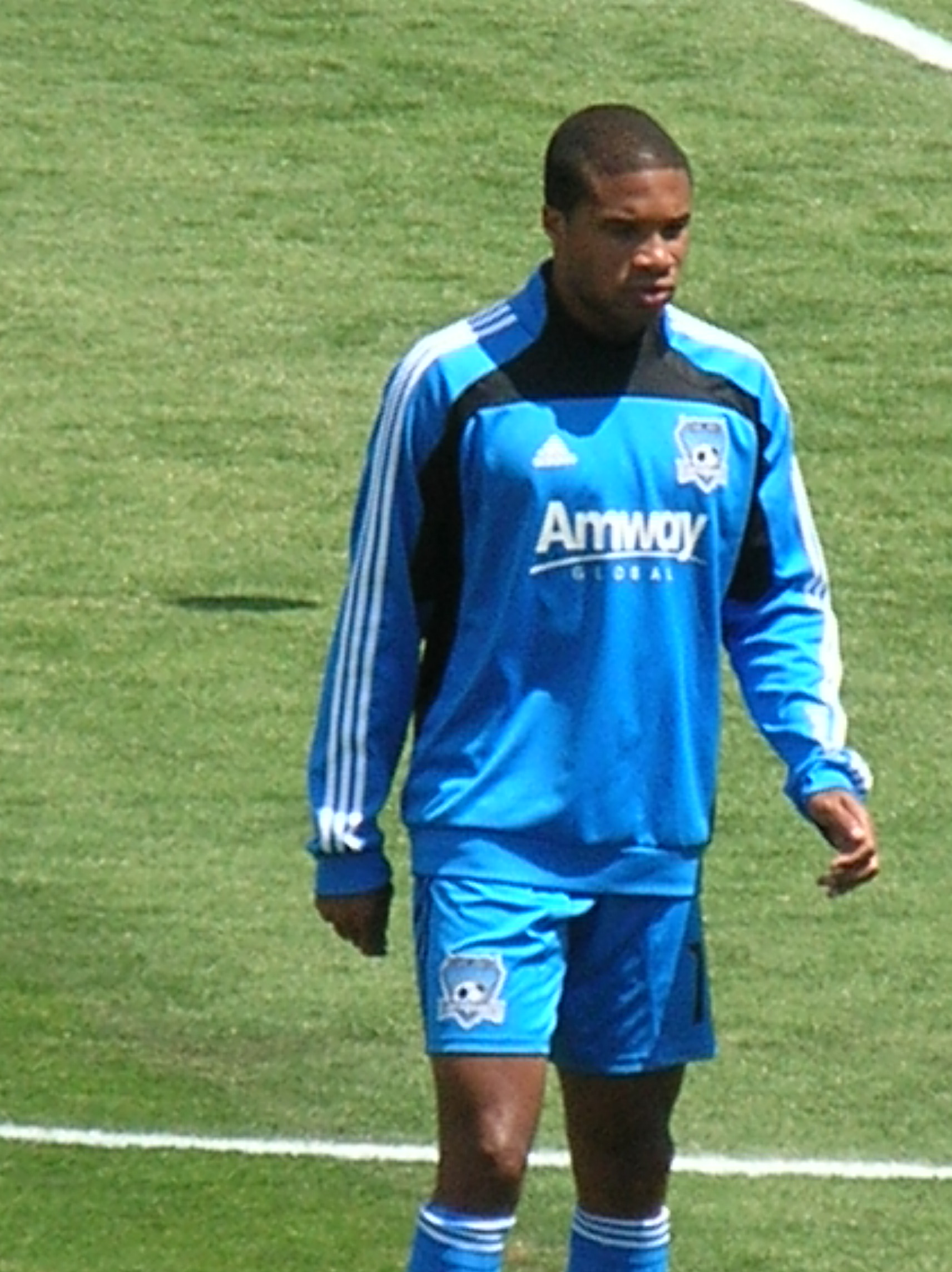
Real Salt Lake selected Ryan Johnson 26th overall. In 7 MLS seasons, he played 181 games. He earned 36 caps with the Jamaica national team.

Pick #	MLS Team	Player	Position	Affiliation
25	Los Angeles Galaxy (Note: #25: Chivas USA → Los Angeles Galaxy. 2005-03-11: Los Angeles acquired this pick (originally a conditional pick) from Chivas USA in exchange for defender Ryan Suarez.)	(United States) Kyle Veris	D	Ohio State
26	Real Salt Lake	(Jamaica) Ryan Johnson	F/M	Oregon State
27	Columbus Crew	(United States) Brandon Moss	M	New Mexico
28	Kansas City Wizards	(United States) Matt Groenwald	M	St. John's
29	Kansas City Wizards (Note: #29: MetroStars → Kansas City Wizards. 2005-11-22: Kansas City acquired this pick from MetroStars in exchange for the rights to defender Taylor Graham.)	(Scotland) Stephen Shirley	D/M	Virginia Commonwealth
30	FC Dallas	(United States) Ray Burse	GK	Ohio State
31	D.C. United	(Russia) Rod Dyachenko	M	UNLV
32	Houston Dynamo	(United States) Andre Schmid	F	St. John's
33	Columbus Crew (Note: #33: Colorado Rapids → Columbus Crew. 2006-01-20: Columbus acquired this pick from Colorado in exchange for goalkeeper Matt Jordan.)	(United States) Dayton O'Brien	M/F	Memphis
34	Chicago Fire	(United States) Jordan Russolillo	D	So. Connecticut State
35	New England Revolution	(United States) Kyle Brown	F	Tulsa
36	Los Angeles Galaxy	(United States) Chris Dunsheath	GK	Bradley

=== Round four ===
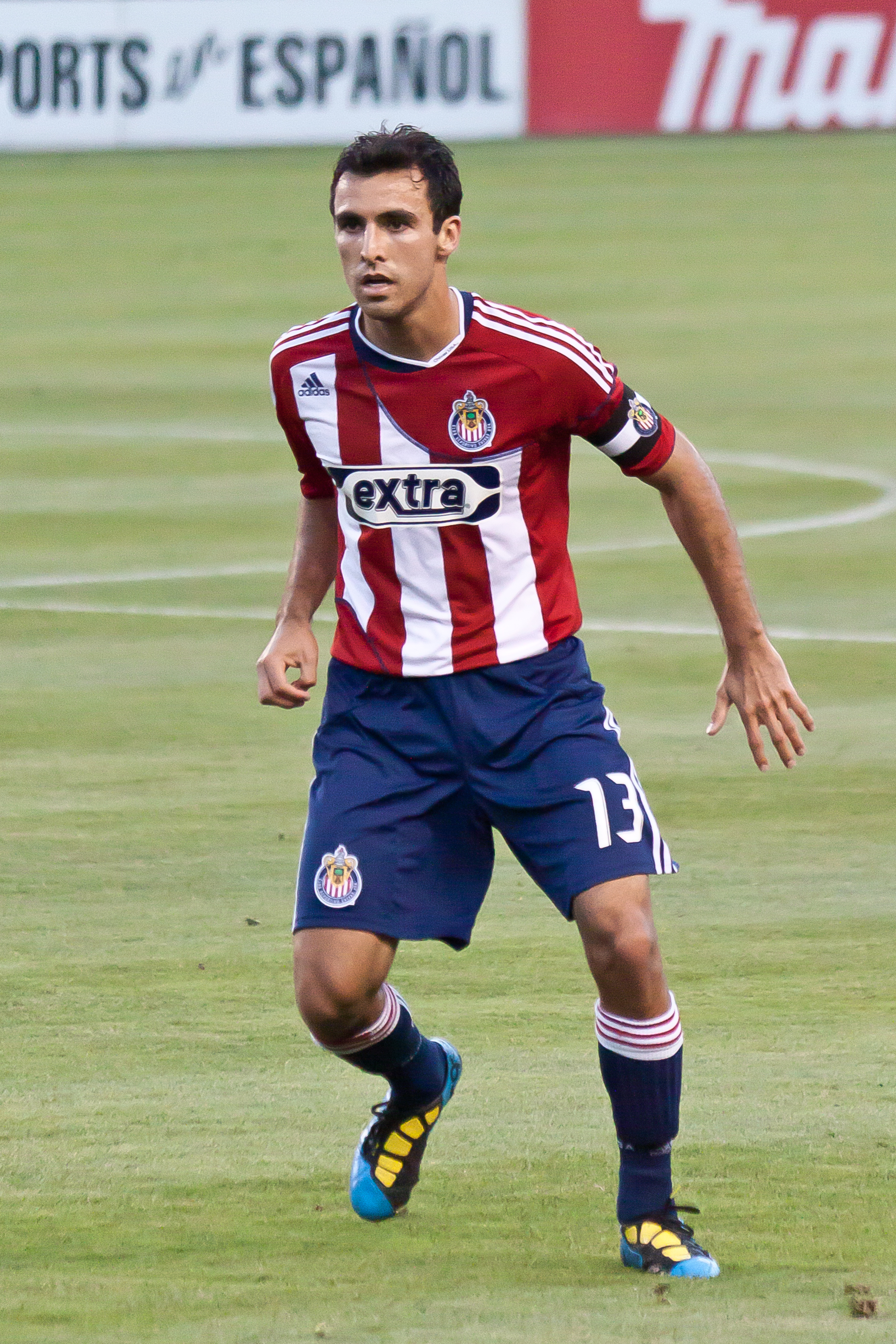
Chivas USA selected Jonathan Bornstein 37th overall. the 2006 Rookie of the Year is a 2x MLS All-Star, and a 2007 MLS Best XI selection. He's earned 38 caps with the U.S. Men's national team and was selected to the 2010 FIFA World Cup squad.

Pick #	MLS Team	Player	Position	Affiliation
37	Chivas USA	(United States) Jonathan Bornstein^§†	D	UCLA
38	Columbus Crew (Note: #38: Real Salt Lake → FC Dallas → Columbus Crew. 2006-01-20: Columbus acquired this pick from FC Dallas in exchange for a third-round selection in the 2007 MLS SuperDraft. (Note: Oller, Rob (January 21, 2006). "Crew drafts college player of year to bolster offense". The Columbus Dispatch.) FC Dallas had acquired this pick (originally one of two "future considerations") from Real Salt Lake in exchange for forward Jason Kreis on 2004-11-17.)	(United States) Duke Hashimoto	F	Southern Methodist
39	D.C. United (Note: #39: Columbus Crew → D.C. United. 2004-01-30: D.C. United acquired this pick, originally "future considerations", from Columbus in exchange for forward Devin Barclay.)	(United States) Jeff Carroll	M/D	St. John's
40	Kansas City Wizards	(United States) Eric Kronberg	GK	California
41	MetroStars (Note: #41: MetroStars → Houston Dynamo → MetroStars. 2006-01-20: MetroStars re-acquired this pick from Houston in exchange for goalkeeper Zach Wells. Houston (then San Jose) had acquired the pick from MetroStars in exchange for goalkeeper Jon Conway on 2005-12-05.)	(United States) Blake Camp	M	Duke
42	FC Dallas	(United States) Michael Dello-Russo	D	Maryland
43	FC Dallas (Note: #43: D.C. United → FC Dallas. 2004-07-23: FC Dallas acquired this pick and a second-round selection in the 2005 MLS Supplemental Draft (originally "future considerations") from D.C. United in exchange for forward Jason Thompson.)	(United States) Mike Ambersley	F	Indiana
44	Houston Dynamo	(United States) Mike Chabala	M	Washington
45	Colorado Rapids	(United States) Josh Brown	D	New Mexico
46	Chicago Fire	(United States) Jeremy Ashe	M	Marshall
47	D.C. United (Note: #47: New England Revolution → D.C. United. 2005-01-20: D.C. United acquired this pick from New England in exchange for goalkeeper Doug Warren.)	(United States) Kenney Bertz	D	Maryland
48	Los Angeles Galaxy	(United States) Aaron King	F	NC State

== See also ==
- Draft (sports)
- Generation Adidas
- Major League Soccer
- MLS SuperDraft
