= Glenn van Straatum =

Surinamese footballer and manager

Personal information
- Full name: Glenn van Straatum
- Date of birth: 26 January 1959 (age 67)
- Place of birth: Paramaribo, Suriname
- Position: Midfielder

Team information
- Current team: Cal Victory

Senior career*
Years	Team	Apps	(Gls)
1973–1978	Transvaal		
1978–1982	University of San Francisco		

International career
1976–1978	Suriname		

Managerial career
- 2006–2007: California Victory
- 2019–2024: Merritt College
- * Club domestic league appearances and goals

Glenn van Straatum (born 26 January 1959, in Paramaribo, Suriname) is an association football manager and former Surinamese football midfielder and forward. He was appointed as the manager of the California Victory, a new expansion franchise in the USL Division 1 for 2007. However, the club folded after only one season leaving Van Straatum a free-agent.

Van Straatum has played for SV Transvaal in Surinam (1973–1978) and at the University of San Francisco (1978–1982) and for several semi-professional teams in the San Francisco area including the Greek-Americans FC, Hellas FC, San Francisco Italian Athletic Club and San Francisco Glens in California (1978–1989). He appeared for Surinam national football team from 1976 to 1978. Van Straatum was hired as head coach at Merritt College in August 2019.
