= Duncan Oughton =

New Zealand footballer (born 1977)

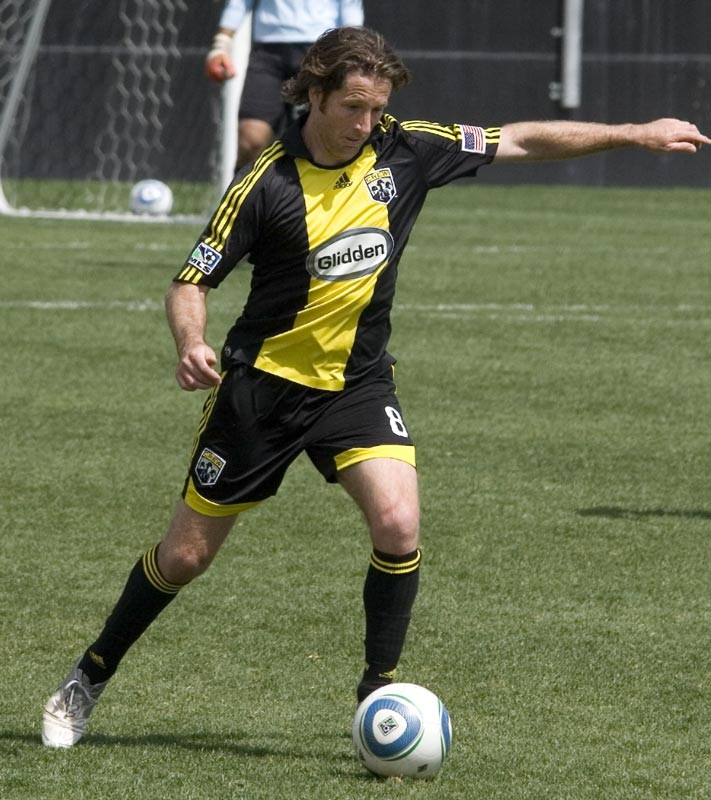
- Oughton with Columbus Crew in 2010

Personal information
- Full name: Duncan Edward Oughton
- Date of birth: 14 June 1977 (age 49)
- Place of birth: Karori, New Zealand
- Height: 5 ft 9 in (1.75 m)
- Position: Defender

Youth career
- –1997: University of Otago

College career
Years	Team	Apps	(Gls)
1997–2000	Cal State Fullerton Titans		

Senior career*
Years	Team	Apps	(Gls)
2001–2010	Columbus Crew	136	(3)

International career^{‡}
2002–2009	New Zealand	25	(2)

Managerial career
- 2011–2013: Columbus Crew (assistant)
- 2013–2014: Toronto FC (assistant)
- * Club domestic league appearances and goals as of 27 September 2010 ‡ National team caps and goals as of 27 October 2009

Duncan Oughton (born 14 June 1977) is a retired New Zealand association football player. Oughton played professionally in the United States for Major League Soccer club Columbus Crew and represented New Zealand internationally. He was an assistant coach for Toronto FC until 31 October 2014, when the team let Ryan Nelsen and five of his assistant coaches go. Today he is the host of the TV series Soccer & Beer.

== Career ==
=== Youth and college ===
Oughton attended the University of Otago in New Zealand, before moving to the United States to play college soccer at Cal State Fullerton from 1997 to 2000. As a senior as CS Fullerton, he scored 17 goals and was credited with 8 assists.

=== Professional ===
Upon graduating, Oughton was selected 10th overall in the 2001 MLS SuperDraft by Columbus Crew. Oughton immediately found playing time with the Crew, playing 20 games as a rookie, including 12 starts. He maintained a starting role for the Crew for the majority of his early career, in part due to his ability to play numerous positions in the midfield and defence. Oughton missed the entire 2005 season with a knee injury and was released in May 2006. However, he continued to train with the team, and in August 2006 the team waived Leonard Bisaku and re-signed Oughton. However, Oughton's playing time with the Crew became more sporadic; he made just nine first team appearances in 2006 and only five in 2008. In 2009, Oughton scored a bicycle kick goal against USL 1st Division Rochester Rhinos in a US Open Cup match, however, the Crew lost in penalties, with Oughton's being saved. In the 2009 MLS season, Oughton had been given the chance to be back in the first team and was rewarded with two straight starts, earning an assist.

After the 2010 MLS season Columbus declined Oughton's contract option, and he elected to participate in the 2010 MLS Re-Entry Draft. Oughton became a free agent in Major League Soccer when he was not selected in the Re-Entry draft.

On 3 February 2011, Oughton announced his retirement from playing and was hired as the assistant to the technical director for Columbus.

=== International ===
Oughton has represented the New Zealand national team, on numerous occasions. He received his first cap in 2002 in a win over Tahiti in the Oceania Nations Cup and went on to make 25 appearances and score 2 goals in A-internationals.

He was a member of New Zealand's 2003 FIFA Confederations Cup squad, and had a second taste of the big tournament atmosphere when he was named as part of the 2009 FIFA Confederations Cup squad to travel to South Africa. His final appearance for New Zealand was as a second-half substitute in the 2–0 loss to South Africa on 17 June 2009.

=== International goals ===
#	Date	Venue	Opponent	Score	Result	Competition
1	2004-05-31	Marden Sports Complex, Adelaide, Australia	Solomon Islands	2–0	3–0	2004 OFC Nations Cup
2	2004-06-4	Marden Sports Complex, Adelaide, Australia	Tahiti	8–0	10–0	2004 OFC Nations Cup

== Coaching career ==
After retiring, Oughton joined the staff of the Crew, serving as an assistant coach in addition to serving as assistant technical director. He also served as analyst on regional television broadcasts of the club on Ohio News Network and later Fox Sports Ohio. In March 2013, Oughton was a candidate to replace Ricki Herbert as head coach of the Wellington Phoenix. During the 2013 season, he left Columbus to join the staff of Toronto FC, where he serves as an assistant to former international teammate Ryan Nelsen. Oughton holds a "B" license by the United States Soccer Federation.

== Television career ==
Since 2015, Oughton has been the host and a producer for the show Soccer & Beer. The show centers around him exploring soccer cultures around the world and the drinks people celebrate with.

== Honors ==
=== Columbus Crew ===
- Major League Soccer MLS Cup (1): 2008
- Major League Soccer Supporters Shield (3): 2004, 2008, 2009
- Lamar Hunt US Open Cup (1): 2002
