= Ivan Becerra =

Mexican footballer (born 1984)

Personal information
- Full name: Jorge Ivan Becerra
- Date of birth: May 22, 1984 (age 42)
- Place of birth: San Luis Potosí, Mexico
- Height: 6 ft 2 in (1.88 m)
- Position: Defender

Youth career
- San Fernando High School

College career
Years	Team	Apps	(Gls)
2002–2003	Los Angeles Mission College		
2004–2005	UC Santa Barbara Gauchos	34	(12)

Senior career*
Years	Team	Apps	(Gls)
2006	Columbus Crew	0	(0)
2006	→ Cincinnati Kings (loan)	4	(0)
2009	Ventura County Fusion	4	(0)
2009	Portland Timbers	1	(0)
2010	Ventura County Fusion	3	(1)
2011	Wilmington Hammerheads FC	23	(3)
Total		35	(4)

Managerial career
- 2009–2019: Santa Barbara SC
- 2011–2018: Bishop Diego Cardinals (boys)
- 2018–2019: Bishop Diego Cardinals (girls)
- 2019–: Kickers SC Central Coast
- * Club domestic league appearances and goals

Jorge Ivan Becerra (born May 22, 1984) is a Mexican former professional soccer player.

== Early life and education ==
Becerra was born May 22, 1984, in San Luis Potosí, Mexico. He and his family would move to the United States before Becerra's 6th birthday. He attended San Fernando High School, where he played soccer and football.

Becerra played college soccer at Los Angeles Mission College from 2002 to 2003, scoring 34 goals and 19 assists during his two seasons there. He then transferred to the University of California, Santa Barbara, where he played two seasons for the UC Santa Barbara Gauchos men's soccer team. As a forward in his first year playing behind Drew McAthy, Becerra appeared in 14 games and tallied 2 assists, but failed to score. In his final year in Santa Barbara, Becerra played in 20 games, starting 18 of them, where scored 12 goals and 2 assists. He was named the 2005–06 Male Athlete of the Year by the Daily Nexus.

== Playing career ==
Becerra was drafted in the third round (27th overall) of the 2006 MLS Supplemental Draft by Columbus Crew. Crew head coach Sigi Schmid converted Becerra to a central defender once on the team due to Columbus already having 4 forwards ahead of Becerra on the depth chart. He did not appear in a first-team match with the Crew in league play (although he did make one appearance in the US Open Cup) and was subsequently sent on loan to then-USL Second Division side Cincinnati Kings. He made his professional debut on July 21, 2006. He featured as a starter for Cincinnati and appeared in four games with the Kings, the last being August 13, 2006, before returning to the Crew. Despite appearing in 6 MLS Reserve League matches for the Crew, he was waived in March 2007 as the team sought to become roster-compliant in preseason.

Becerra signed for Ventura County Fusion of the USL Premier Development League for the 2009 season. He made his debut for the team on May 30, 2009, in a game against Bakersfield Brigade. Becerra would ultimately appear for the Fusion 4 times en route to winning the 2009 PDL Championship and scoring a goal in the championship game.

At the end of the 2009 PDL season, Becerra signed for Portland Timbers. He played one regular season game before being released in December 2009.

After returning to Ventura County Fusion in 2010 and appearing in 3 games with 1 goal scored, Becerra signed with Wilmington Hammerheads FC in March 2011 for the 2011 USL Pro season. He served as the team's co-captain appearing in 23 games and scoring 3 goals.

== Coaching career ==
Becerra was named the head coach of Bishop Garcia Diego High School in October 2011. He also coaches youth soccer with Santa Barbara SC.

== Awards and honors ==
=== Ventura County Fusion ===
- USL Premier Development League Champions (1): 2009
