= Joel Kitamirike =

Footballer (born 1984)

Personal information
- Full name: Joel Derick Kitamirike
- Date of birth: 5 April 1984 (age 42)
- Place of birth: Kampala, Uganda
- Position: Defender

Youth career
- Chelsea

Senior career*
Years	Team	Apps	(Gls)
2001–2004	Chelsea	1	(0)
2003–2004	→ Brentford (loan)	22	(0)
2004–2005	Mansfield Town	2	(0)
2005	Dundee	8	(0)
2006	Columbus Crew	1	(0)
2006–2007	Fisher Athletic	22	(1)
2007–2008	Weymouth	19	(0)
2008	Chelmsford City	1	(0)
Total		75	(1)

International career
2004	England U15		
- * Club domestic league appearances and goals

Joel Derick Kitamirike (born 5 April 1984) is a former professional footballer who played as a defender. He played for Football League One club Brentford during the 2003–04 season and for Scottish Premier League club Dundee in 2005. His most recent club was Chelmsford City. Born in Uganda, he moved to England as a child and has British citizenship.

In November 2008, he was sentenced to 20 months' imprisonment for supplying Class A drugs and possession of Class A and other drugs with intent to supply.

== Club career ==
Kitamirike was born in Kampala, Uganda, in 1984 and came to England when he was six years old. He began his career as a youth player at Chelsea, where he made one appearance aged 17, deputising in a UEFA Cup tie against Hapoel Tel Aviv, when several players did not travel to Israel because of a security threat. He joined Brentford on loan in September 2003 and extended his loan in November 2003 for the rest of the 2003–04 season, during which he made 25 league and cup appearances for Brentford. He was released by Chelsea at the end of the 2003–04 season, and after trials with Dutch club Willem II and Walsall, joined Mansfield Town in December 2004 on a non-contract basis. He made two appearances for Mansfield before joining Dundee in January 2005 on a two-year contract. He made seven starts for Dundee in the 2004–05 season as the club were relegated from the Scottish Premier League and made two further appearances before leaving the club in November 2005 after agreeing a deal to terminate his contract. Two months later, he joined Major Soccer League club, Columbus Crew.

He made one appearance for the Crew before dropping into English non-league football and playing for Fisher Athletic and Weymouth. He was released by Weymouth in February 2008 and joined Chelmsford City, for whom he made one appearance before leaving the club at the end of the 2007–08 season.

In November 2008, he was sentenced to 20 months' imprisonment for supplying Class A drugs and possession of Class A and other drugs with intent to supply.

== International career ==
Kitamirike represented England at under-15 level and in 2004, the Uganda national football team included him in their squad for the 2006 World Cup and Nations Cup qualifier against DR Congo in June 2004, taking advantage of new FIFA rules making him eligible to play for his country of birth at full international level. Although Kitamirike was keen to play, Ugandan immigration law did not permit dual nationality. Kitamirike was unwilling to give up British citizenship in order to get a Ugandan passport so he missed the game.
