= Brandon Moss (soccer) =

American soccer player

Personal information
- Full name: Brandon Moss
- Date of birth: May 12, 1984 (age 42)
- Place of birth: Albuquerque, New Mexico, U.S.
- Height: 6 ft 1 in (1.85 m)
- Position: Midfielder

College career
| Years | Team | Apps | (Gls) |
| 2002–2005 | New Mexico Lobos | | |

Senior career*
| Years | Team | Apps | (Gls) |
| 2003 | Boulder Rapids Reserve | 3 | (0) |
| 2004–2005 | Chicago Fire Premier | 28 | (3) |
| 2006–2007 | Columbus Crew | 20 | (0) |

Managerial career
- 2009: Ohio State Buckeyes (volunteer asst.)
- 2010–2014: New Mexico Lobos (asst.)
- * Club domestic league appearances and goals as of 3 December 2006 ‡ National team caps and goals as of 3 December 2006

Brandon Moss (born May 12, 1984) is an American former soccer player who last played for the Columbus Crew of Major League Soccer.

Moss played for the Classic FC Bandidos where he won 3 regional championships. Moss played college soccer at the University of New Mexico, where he started in 83 matches from 2002 to 2005. He also played in the USL Premier Development League for both Boulder Rapids Reserve and Chicago Fire Premier.

He was drafted in the third round, 27th overall, by the Columbus Crew in the 2006 MLS SuperDraft and played 20 games for the Crew during his rookie season.

He announced his retirement in January 2008. He joined as a voluntary assistant at Ohio State University in August 2009 after his retirement

Moss re-joined the University of New Mexico program an assistant coach from 2010 to 2014.
