= Dan Popik =

American soccer player and coach

Personal information
- Date of birth: March 23, 1979 (age 47)
- Place of birth: Syosset, New York, U.S.
- Height: 6 ft 3 in (1.91 m)
- Position: Goalkeeper

College career
Years	Team	Apps	(Gls)
1998–1999	St. John's Red Storm		

Senior career*
Years	Team	Apps	(Gls)
2000–2002	Milwaukee Rampage	?	(?)
2003–2004	Los Angeles Galaxy	2	(0)
2006	Columbus Crew	1	(0)

Managerial career
- 2005–2010: NC State Wolfpack (assistant)
- 2009: Carolina RailHawks (assistant)
- 2011: Furman Paladins (assistant)
- 2012–2013: Green Bay Phoenix
- * Club domestic league appearances and goals

Dan Popik (born March 23, 1979) is an American retired soccer goalkeeper who is currently coaching at CASL for the U14, U15, and U16 teams, representing all three in Region 3 play. He has previously served as an assistant with the Carolina RailHawks of the USL First Division and two Division I men's teams, NC State and Furman. Popik last played goalkeeper for the Columbus Crew of Major League Soccer.

A highly touted prospect who spent time with the Under-20 United States national team, Popik played college soccer at St. John's University, but left after two seasons. He did not get into MLS right away; instead, he signed with the A-League's Milwaukee Rampage in 2000. Popik would play three years for the club, leading them to the league championship in 2002.

Popik signed with the Los Angeles Galaxy prior to the 2003 MLS season as backup to Kevin Hartman. In two seasons, he only appeared in two league games, neither of them starts. The Galaxy released Popik after the 2004 season. He was the lone player who ended the 2004 season on an MLS roster to attempt to become a replacement player for the U.S. national team during the labor dispute in early 2005.

He is currently the assistant coach/goalkeeper coach at North Carolina State University. In 2006, he joined the Columbus Crew as an injury replacement and played one game. He remained at NC State until 2009 when he became the goalkeeper coach with the Carolina RailHawks of the USL First Division. In 2011, he became associate head coach at Furman University, and took his position at Green Bay in 2013. He stepped down from Green Bay prior to the 2014 season.
