= Sebastián Rozental =

Chilean footballer (born 1976)

Personal information
- Full name: Sebastián Rozental Igualt
- Date of birth: 1 September 1976 (age 50)
- Place of birth: Santiago, Chile
- Height: 1.78 m (5 ft 10 in)
- Positions: Attacking midfielder; striker

Senior career*
Years	Team	Apps	(Gls)
1992–1996	Universidad Católica	75	(39)
1997–2002	Rangers	17	(3)
1999	→ Universidad Católica (loan)	27	(22)
2000	→ Independiente (loan)	11	(0)
2001	→ Colo-Colo (loan)	22	(8)
2002–2003	Grasshoppers	22	(1)
2003–2004	Unión Española	39	(11)
2005	Universidad Católica	10	(1)
2005	Puerto Rico Islanders	9	(2)
2006	Columbus Crew	20	(3)
2007	Maccabi Petah Tikva	6	(0)
2007–2008	Maccabi Netanya	14	(1)
Total		279	(94)

International career
1993	Chile U17	5	(4)
1995	Chile U20	3	(3)
1995–2000	Chile	27	(2)
1996	Chile U23		
1998	Chile B	1	(0)
- * Club domestic league appearances and goals

Sebastián Rozental Igualt (born 1 September 1976) is a Chilean former professional footballer who played as an attacking midfielder or striker. At club level, Rozental played for Universidad Católica (1992–1996 and 2005), Colo-Colo (2001), and Unión Española (2003–04) in his native Chile, Rangers (1997–2000) in Scotland, where he became the first player from South America to play for the club, Independiente (2001) in Argentina, Grasshoppers (2003–04) in Switzerland, and Puerto Rico Islanders in the USL First Division (2005).

== Early and personal life ==
Rozental was born in Santiago, Chile, and is Jewish.

== Club career ==
=== Rangers ===
Rozental became Rangers' first South American player when he signed for £4 million on 13 December 1996, the most expensive signing in Chilean history. He arrived at Rangers as a promising young talent, as he had broken into the Chile national team and was challenging Marcelo Salas and Iván Zamorano for a place in the starting eleven, following a decent scoring record at his club. He made his debut as a substitute in a league match at Motherwell. However injury struck in his second appearance for Rangers versus St Johnstone in the Scottish Cup; he started the game well and scored his first goal for the club, but was then taken off with a knee injury. He made three appearances in 1997–98 and another three in 1998–99. He had his first significant run in the team in the second half of the 1999–2000 season, helping Rangers complete a league and cup double. He made 11 appearances and scored 3 goals in the league that season, and scored twice in their cup semi final win over Ayr United. He was however left out of the squad for the final. He made 21 appearances for Rangers, scoring 6 goals.

=== Late career ===
Rozental signed for the Columbus Crew on 13 January 2006. His first goal as a Crew member came on a penalty kick on 15 April against the Chicago Fire. He played 20 games and scored 3 goals total during the 2006 season.

After spending one season with the Columbus Crew, Rozental got Israeli citizenship and left for Israel and signed with Maccabi Petah Tikva. After failing to impress in one half season in Petah Tikva, Rozental signed a one-year contract with Maccabi Netanya.

== International career ==
Rozental has been capped for Chile 27 times scoring 2 goals. In addition, he played for Chile B against England B on 10 February 1998. Chile won by 2-1.

He captained the Chilean squad that finished third in the 1993 FIFA U-17 World Championship and then scored 3 goals at the 1995 FIFA World Youth Championship. Also, he took part of Chile U23 squad in the 1996 Pre-Olympic Tournament.

== Career statistics ==
=== International ===
Appearances and goals by national team and year
National team	Year	Apps	Goals
Chile	1995	9	2
Chile	1996	11	0
Chile	1997	1	0
Chile	1998	0	0
Chile	1999	0	0
Chile	2000	6	0
Total		27	2

Scores and results list Chile's goal tally first, score column indicates score after each Rozental goal.

List of international goals scored by Sebastián Rozental
No.	Date	Venue	Cap	Opponent	Score	Result	Competition
1.	8 July 1995	Estadio Parque Artigas, Paysandú, Uruguay	6	United States	1–2	1–2	1995 Copa América
2.	10 October 1995	Estadio Ester Roa, Concepción, Chile	9	Canada	1–0	2–0	Friendly

== Honours ==
Universidad Católica

- Copa Interamericana: 1993
- Copa Chile: 1995
- Liga Chilena de Fútbol: Primera División: 2002 (C)

Rangers

- Scottish Premier League: 1999–2000

Grasshoppers

- Swiss Super League: 2002–03

Chile U17

- FIFA U-17 World Cup third place: 1993

Individual

- Chilean Footballer of the Year: 1996

== See also ==
- List of select Jewish football (association; soccer) players
