= Thulani Ncube =

Zimbabwean footballer (born 1977)

Personal information
- Date of birth: 21 September 1977 (age 49)
- Position: Defender

Senior career*
Years	Team	Apps	(Gls)
1998–2002	Highlanders F.C.		
2002–2003	Ajax Cape Town F.C.		
2003–2004	Cape Cod Crusaders		
2005–2006	Highlanders F.C.		

International career
1998–2002	Zimbabwe	25	(0)
- * Club domestic league appearances and goals

Thulani Ncube (born 21 September 1977) is a retired Zimbabwean football defender.
