= Ryan Coiner =

American soccer player

Personal information
- Date of birth: September 7, 1979 (age 47)
- Place of birth: Aliso Viejo, California, U.S.
- Height: 6 ft 1 in (1.85 m)
- Position: Forward

College career
Years	Team	Apps	(Gls)
1999–2002	San Diego Toreros		(49)

Senior career*
Years	Team	Apps	(Gls)
2001	Southern California Seahorses		
2003	Orange County Blue Star	17	(11)
2003–2004	Arminia Bielefeld II	20	(16)
2004–2005	Union Berlin	32	(12)
2005–2006	Holstein Kiel	31	(10)
2006	Columbus Crew	3	(0)
- * Club domestic league appearances and goals

Ryan Coiner (born September 7, 1979) is an American former professional soccer forward who played in Germany and Major League Soccer.

== College ==
Coiner was born in Aliso Viejo, California. He played college soccer at the University of San Diego from 1999 to 2002. He was named West Coast Conference Player of the Year twice was a 2000 and 2002 NSCAA Second Team All-American. He is second all-time in school record books with forty-nine goals scored. In 2001, he played for the Southern California Seahorses during the collegiate off season. In 2003, he also played with Orange County Blue Star in the USL Premier Development League, where he played alongside Juergen Klinsmann.

== Professional ==
Upon graduating he traveled to Germany to join Arminia Bielefeld's reserve side. After one season there appearing in twenty games with sixteen goals he was signed by German third-division side 1. FC Union Berlin. With Union Berlin he appeared in 32 matches, scoring twelve goals. The next season, he was signed by Holstein Kiel where he would appear in thirty-one matches and score ten goals. After his success in the German leagues, he decided to come back to the United States.

On July 13, 2006, Coiner signed with the Columbus Crew of Major League Soccer. On January 12, 2007, the Crew traded Coiner, and a first round draft pick (second overall) in the 2007 MLS SuperDraft to the Chicago Fire in exchange for Andy Herron. Coiner retired before the 2007 season due to repeated problems with his lower back.
