= Jason Garey =

American soccer player

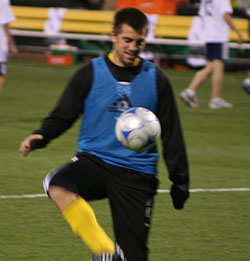

Personal information
- Full name: Jason Garey
- Date of birth: July 19, 1984 (age 42)
- Place of birth: Baton Rouge, Louisiana, United States
- Height: 1.86 m (6 ft 1 in)
- Position: Forward

College career
Years	Team	Apps	(Gls)
2002–2005	Maryland Terrapins	98	(60)

Senior career*
Years	Team	Apps	(Gls)
2006–2010	Columbus Crew	83	(15)
2011	Houston Dynamo	10	(0)
2012	Carolina RailHawks	17	(3)
Total		110	(18)
- * Club domestic league appearances and goals as of September 26, 2012

Jason Garey (born July 19, 1984) is an American soccer player.

== Career ==
=== Youth and college ===
Born in Baton Rouge, Louisiana, Garey, who grew up in Gonzales, Louisiana, attended St. Amant High School and played for the Baton Rouge Soccer Club. He continues to hold Louisiana high school records for most goals in a season (73) and in a career (170). Garey played college soccer at the University of Maryland. In his senior season, he scored 22 goals in 25 games, was named a first-team All-American, won the Hermann Trophy as the best college player, and led the Terrapins to the College Cup.

=== Professional ===
Garey was drafted by Columbus Crew in the first round (third overall) at the 2006 MLS SuperDraft and was with the club when they won the 2008 MLS Cup.

After five seasons with Columbus Crew, Garey's rights were traded to Houston Dynamo in exchange for a fourth-round draft pick in the 2015 MLS SuperDraft. At the end of the 2011 season, Houston declined his 2012 contract option and he entered the 2011 MLS Re-Entry Draft. Garey was not selected in the draft and became a free agent.

Garey signed with Carolina RailHawks of the North American Soccer League on January 20, 2012.

== Honors ==
Columbus Crew

- Major League Soccer Eastern Conference Championship: 2008
- Major League Soccer MLS Cup: 2008
- Major League Soccer Supporter's Shield: 2008, 2009

== Beyond the pitch ==
Garey is a spokesman for Vanishing Paradise, a joint campaign by Ducks Unlimited and the National Wildlife Federation to raise awareness for wetlands preservation in his home state of Louisiana.

Garey serves as color commentator for North Carolina FC television broadcasts. He also serves on the board of directors for NCFC Youth.

In 2012, Garey self published Geauxing Galt, a libertarian novel inspired by Atlas Shrugged.
