= Jacob Thomas (soccer) =

American soccer player

Personal information
- Full name: Jacob Thomas
- Date of birth: February 14, 1977 (age 49)
- Place of birth: Austin, Texas, U.S.
- Height: 5 ft 10 in (1.78 m)
- Positions: Midfielder; forward

College career
Years	Team	Apps	(Gls)
1995	St. Louis		

Senior career*
Years	Team	Apps	(Gls)
1996–1999	Austin Lone Stars		
1999–2004	Eintracht Braunschweig	119	(21)
2004–2005	VfB Lübeck	40	(4)
2006–2007	Columbus Crew	28	(2)
- * Club domestic league appearances and goals as of 13 January 2008 ‡ National team caps and goals as of 3 December 2006

Jacob Thomas (born February 14, 1977) is an American former soccer midfielder who last played for the Columbus Crew in Major League Soccer.

== Career ==
After one season of college soccer, playing for the Saint Louis University, Thomas played for the Austin Lone Stars in the USISL. In 1999 Thomas went to Germany and joined Dritte Liga club Eintracht Braunschweig where he played for the next five years, including one season in the 2. Bundesliga. In 2004, he moved to VfB Lübeck, where he remained for two seasons. On March 28, 2006, he was signed by the Columbus Crew. He was released after the 2009 season.

== Personal life ==
Thomas married his wife Franziska, the daughter of former Eintracht Braunschweig player Franz Merkhoffer, during his time in Braunschweig. Thomas has two sons, both soccer players.
