= Matt Schmidt =

American soccer player

Personal information
- Full name: Matthew Robert Schmidt
- Date of birth: June 5, 1979 (age 47)
- Place of birth: Milwaukee, WI, United States
- Height: 6 ft 0 in (1.83 m)
- Positions: Defender; midfielder

College career
Years	Team	Apps	(Gls)
–2001	Yale Bulldogs		

Senior career*
Years	Team	Apps	(Gls)
2001–2002	Minnesota Thunder	?	(?)
2001–2006	Milwaukee Wave (indoor)	168	(44)
2003–2006	Minnesota Thunder	41	(3)
- * Club domestic league appearances and goals as of December 22, 2006

Matt Schmidt (born June 5, 1979, in Milwaukee, Wisconsin) is a former defender/midfielder who played for American USL First Division side Minnesota Thunder.

Schmidt played soccer at Marquette High School before entering Yale University where he graduated in 2001. That year, the Milwaukee Wave of the National Professional Soccer League drafted Schmidt in the second round of the NPSL Draft. That year, he also joined the Minnesota Thunder of the USL A-League, playing with the team until 2006.
