= Ricardo Virtuoso =

Brazilian footballer and futsal player

Personal information
- Full name: Ricardo Magno Virtuoso Guarà
- Date of birth: 1 March 1984 (age 42)
- Place of birth: Guarapuava, Brazil
- Height: 5 ft 8 in (1.73 m)
- Position: Midfielder

Team information
- Current team: Valenga/Juventude Futsal
- Number: 7

Youth career
- 1998–2004: Guaratinguetá/SP
- 2004: Clube Atlético Juventus

Senior career*
Years	Team	Apps	(Gls)
2004–2005	FC Chiasso	15	(0)
2006–2008	Columbus Crew	18	(1)
2008–2010	Valenga/Juventude Futsal		
2010	SC Zofingen	11	(2)
2010–2011	FC Chiasso	15	(0)
2011–	Valenga/Juventude Futsal	21	(12)
- * Club domestic league appearances and goals

Ricardo Magno Virtuoso Guarà (born 1 March 1984) is a Brazilian former footballer and current futsal player.

== Club career ==
Virtuoso played in the youth systems of Guaratinguetá/SP and Clube Atlético Juventus. He signed with Swiss second division side FC Chiasso in 2004 and played two seasons there. On 18 May 2006, Virtuoso signed with the Columbus Crew, and was with the team until he was waived in March 2008. He returned in summer 2009 to sign with SC Zofingen, who played under his real name Ricardo Guara. After one season with SC Zofingen, returned for one season to his first Swiss club FC Chiasso. After the 2010–11 season, Virtuoso left Swiss and returned to Brazil.

== International career ==
Virtuoso has also been a member of the Brazil national U-17 team.

== Futsal ==
After the end of his contract 2011 with Swiss side FC Chiasso, Virtuoso joined Brazilian Futsal club Valenga/Juventude Futsal.
