= Duke Hashimoto =

American soccer player

Personal information
- Full name: Duke E. Hashimoto
- Date of birth: December 15, 1984 (age 41)
- Place of birth: Kapolei, Hawaii, U.S.
- Height: 5 ft 7 in (1.70 m)
- Position: Forward

Youth career
- Honolulu Bulls

College career
Years	Team	Apps	(Gls)
2002–2005	SMU Mustangs		

Senior career*
Years	Team	Apps	(Gls)
2005	DFW Tornados	1	(0)
2006	Columbus Crew	0	(0)
2007–2008	Real Salt Lake	0	(0)
2008	Atlanta Silverbacks	4	(0)

Managerial career
- 2012: Hawaiʻi-Hilo Vulcans (asst.)
- * Club domestic league appearances and goals as of October 1, 2008

Duke Hashimoto (born December 15, 1984) is an American retired soccer forward. He currently resides in Honolulu, Hawaii and works as a commercial and residential Realtor.

== College ==
Hashimoto grew up in Hawaii, where he played soccer at Iolani School. He was a two time (2001, 2002) All State soccer player and the 2002 State Soccer Player of the Year. His Honolulu Bulls club team won the 2004 USYSA U-19 National Championship. However, his junior year, he tore the anterior cruciate ligament in his right knee, which would become a recurring theme in his career. He attended Southern Methodist University, playing on the men's soccer team from 2002 to 2005. He lost the last third of his junior season after tearing the ACL in his left knee. He was a 2005 second team All American.

== Professional ==
In 2005, Hashimoto played as an amateur with the DFW Tornados of the fourth division Premier Development League. On January 20, 2006, the Columbus Crew selected Hashimoto in the fourth round (38th overall) in the 2006 MLS SuperDraft. On May 23, 2006, the Crew traded Hashimoto to Real Salt Lake in exchange for Noah Palmer. He then spent the rest of the season with Real's reserves, playing eight games and scoring three goals. In June 2007, he tore the ACL in his left knee, forcing him to sit out the season. He had surgery, but tore it again in September 2007. He failed to gain first team game time in 2008 and on March 3, 2008, the Salt Lake waived him. On August 28, 2008, the Atlanta Silverbacks of the USL First Division acquired him for the remainder of the season.

== Coaching and Management ==
Duke Hashimoto moved back to Hawaii coaching elite youth soccer academy Abunai island soccer. Hashimoto coached with the University of Hawaiʻi at Hilo men's soccer team in 2012.
