= Dayton O'Brien =

American soccer player

Dayton O’Brien
Personal information
- Date of birth: October 29, 1983 (age 42)
- Place of birth: Memphis, TN, United States
- Height: 5 ft 11 in (1.80 m)
- Position: Midfielder

Youth career
- –2001: Memphis Rangers

College career
Years	Team	Apps	(Gls)
2002–2005	Memphis Tigers		

Senior career*
Years	Team	Apps	(Gls)
2002–2003	Memphis Express	36	(12)
2004–2005	Cape Cod Crusaders	33	(6)
2006	Columbus Crew	0	(0)
2007	Atlanta Silverbacks	19	(1)
2008	Minnesota Thunder	10	(0)
- * Club domestic league appearances and goals

Dayton O’Brien (born October 29, 1983, in Memphis, Tennessee) is an American soccer player, currently without a club.

== Youth ==
O’Brien grew up in Memphis, Tennessee, where he played for the Memphis Rangers youth club. O’Brien and his Rangers teammates won the Tennessee state championship in 1998 and 2001. He attended high school at Evangelical Christian School in Cordova, Tennessee, a suburb or Memphis. He was an All State soccer player in 2001. O’Brien graduated from high school in the spring of 2002 and entered the University of Memphis that fall. He played on the Memphis Tigers soccer team from 2002 to 2005. In 2004, he was named a second team All American. When he finished his career at Memphis, he held the career assists record with thirty-four. In 2002 and 2003, O’Brien played for the Memphis Express in the Premier Development League. In 2004 and 2005, O’Brien played for the Cape Cod Crusaders of the Premier Development League . The Crusaders went to the third round of the 2004 U.S. Open Cup and O’Brien finished that Open Cup with two assists.

== Professional ==
On January 20, 2006, the Columbus Crew of Major League Soccer selected O’Brien in the third round (thirty-third overall) in the 2004 MLS SuperDraft. He was a regular during the Crew pre-season but never saw time in a first team game that season. The Crew released O’Brien at the end of the 2006 season and on February 1, 2007, he signed with the Atlanta Silverbacks of the USL First Division. He saw time in nineteen league games and three U.S. Open Cup games with Atlanta, including scoring a goal in the Silverbacks’ 10–0 victory over the amateur Azzuri in the first round of the Cup. In the fall of 2006, O’Brien joined the Memphis Mojo, an expansion American Indoor Soccer League team, but the Mojo withdrew from the league before the start of the season. In July 2007, The Philadelphia KiXX of the Major Indoor Soccer League selected O’Brien in the second round of the 2007 Supplemental Player Draft. O’Brien did not sign with the KiXX. On November 7, 2007, Silverbacks traded O’Brien to the Minnesota Thunder in exchange for Ansu Toure.

== Personal ==
O'Brien is married to Rebekah Stevens.
