= California Victory =

American professional soccer team

- Nickname(s): Victory, Vics
- Founded: 2006
- Dissolved: 2007
- Stadium: Kezar Stadium, San Francisco, California, United States
- Capacity: 10,000
- League: USL First Division
- 2007: 12th Playoffs: DNQ
Home colors	Away colors

The California Victory was a USL First Division professional soccer team based in San Francisco, California. It was an expansion team for the 2007 season, but ceased operation in September of that year after parent club Deportivo Alavés withdrew its support.

== History ==
On October 12, 2006, USL President Francisco Marcos announced Dmitry Piterman, a Ukrainian American and chairman of Spanish club Deportivo Alavés, had officially acquired a USL First Division franchise beginning in the 2007 season. The Victory was the first European owned team to compete at any level of the United Football Leagues, and also the first USL First Division team in California since the demise of the San Diego Flash in 2001. The club played at Kezar Stadium, the former home of the Oakland Raiders and San Francisco 49ers.

== Name ==
The name Victory is derived from Alavés’ home city of Vitoria-Gasteiz, the capital city of both the province of Álava and the Basque Country of Spain.

== Management ==
Terry Fisher, a longtime football executive and coach, was the team's first general manager. The team was managed and coached by Glenn van Straatum, while US international Hugo Perez was an assistant.

== Supporters ==
1906 Supporters was the blanket term for the supporters of the California Victory. The term 1906 referred to the 1906 earthquake and fire of San Francisco. 1906 had its roots in early fan support of the San Francisco Seals football team and the San Jose Earthquakes, who were on hiatus from MLS when the Victory began to play. They were identifiable by their custom T-shirts, colourful chants and banners draped over the rails.

California Victory Supporters Association (CVSA) was the official supporters club of the Victory. Seeing a need for community support of the club, several loyal 1906ers met at The Pig & Whistle with members of the Victory front office. There, the attending 1906ers established the CVSA. Through the sales of handmade merchandise and community outreach, the CVSA had effectively created a fan base for the Victory.

== SaveTheVictory.org ==
SaveTheVictory.org was a movement set in motion by the Victory's official supporters club, the CVSA. The goal of the group was to raise enough money by accepting memberships to purchase the club, an ownership model based on the NFL's Green Bay Packers and influenced by My Football Club. They were however ultimately unsuccessful.

== Year-by-year ==
Year	League	Reg.Season	Playoffs	Open Cup
2007	USL First Division	12th	Did not qualify	3rd Round
