= Leonard Bisaku =

Croatian footballer (born 1974)

Personal information
- Full name: Leonard Bisaku
- Date of birth: 22 October 1974 (age 52)
- Place of birth: Zagreb, SR Croatia, SFR Yugoslavia
- Height: 1.78 m (5 ft 10 in)
- Position: Midfielder

Senior career*
Years	Team	Apps	(Gls)
1997–1998	Hajduk Split	12	(0)
1998–1999	Cibalia	22	(0)
1999–2001	Slaven Belupo	40	(1)
2001–2002	Hrvatski Dragovoljac	27	(5)
2002	Pohang Steelers	13	(3)
2003	Ilhwa Chunma	9	(1)
2003–2004	Rijeka	1	(0)
2005–2006	Posušje	5	(2)
2006	Columbus Crew	7	(1)
- * Club domestic league appearances and goals

Leonard Bisaku (born 22 October 1974) is a Croatian retired football midfielder who last played for the Columbus Crew in Major League Soccer.

== Club career ==
He spent most of his professional career playing in Croatia with clubs including, Hajduk Split and NK Rijeka.

At age 31, he signed with the Crew on April 4, 2006, and was released late in the season.

Bisaku belonged to the Kosovar jeweller family.

He is now a football agent.
