= Noah Palmer =

American soccer player

Personal information
- Full name: Noah Hughes Palmer
- Date of birth: April 21, 1983 (age 43)
- Place of birth: Williamsburg, Virginia, United States
- Height: 6 ft 3 in (1.91 m)
- Position: Goalkeeper

College career
Years	Team	Apps	(Gls)
2001–2004	Maryland Terrapins		

Senior career*
Years	Team	Apps	(Gls)
2003	Williamsburg Legacy	13	(0)
2004	Chesapeake Dragons		
2005–2006	Real Salt Lake	0	(0)
2006	Columbus Crew	10	(0)
- * Club domestic league appearances and goals as of March 7, 2007 ‡ National team caps and goals as of March 7, 2007

Noah Hughes Palmer (born April 21, 1983) is an American soccer goalkeeper.

Palmer played college soccer at University of Maryland from 2001 to 2004, finishing his collegiate career with a school-record 34 shutouts and a GAA of 0.86. He also played in the USL Premier Development League for Chesapeake Dragons and his hometown team, Williamsburg Legacy.

He was drafted in the third round, 25th overall, by Real Salt Lake in the 2005 MLS Supplemental Draft. He would miss the entire 2005 season with shoulder surgery.

On May 29, 2006, Palmer was traded to the Columbus Crew for Duke Hashimoto. He played 10 games over the course of the season but was waived during the 2007 pre-season.
