= List of Northamptonshire Cricket Board List A players =

A cricket team representing the Northamptonshire Cricket Board played six List A cricket matches between 1999 and 2002. This is a list of the players who appeared in those matches.

- Richard Ashton, 2 matches, 1999–2000
- David Austen, 1 match, 2000
- Thomas Baker, 1 match, 2002
- Terry Barratt, 1 match, 2001
- David Capel, 3 matches, 2001–2002
- Tim Coleman, 4 matches, 1999–2002
- Jeffrey Cook, 1 match, 1999
- Paul Coverdale, 3 matches, 2001–2002
- Andrew Daniels, 1 match, 2002
- Thomas Dann, 4 matches, 2000–2001
- Martyn Dobson, 1 match, 2001
- Richard Falkner, 4 matches, 1999–2001
- Brenden Fourie, 4 matches, 2001–2002
- Jeremy Goode, 1 match, 1999
- Dale Iniff, 1 match, 1999
- Craig Jennings, 1 match, 2001
- Richard Kaufman, 2 matches, 2000–2001
- Richard King, 2 matches, 2001–2002
- Rob Large, 1 match, 2001
- John Mann, 2 matches, 2000–2001
- Ross McLean, 2 matches, 2000–2002
- Mark Neave, 1 match, 2001
- Robert Pack, 2 matches, 1999–2000
- Chris Park, 1 match, 2002
- David Paynter, 1 match, 2001
- David Roberts, 2 matches, 2001
- Adam Shantry, 1 match, 2002
- Marcus Steed, 4 matches, 2001–2002
- Arran Steele, 1 match, 1999
- Alec Swann, 1 match, 2000
- Raymond Swann, 1 match, 1999
- Glenn Thompson, 1 match, 1999
- Jamie Wade, 2 matches, 2001
- John Wolstenholme, 1 match, 2000
- Mark Wolstenholme, 5 matches, 1999–2001
