= 2007 Columbus Crew season =

Columbus Crew
2007 season
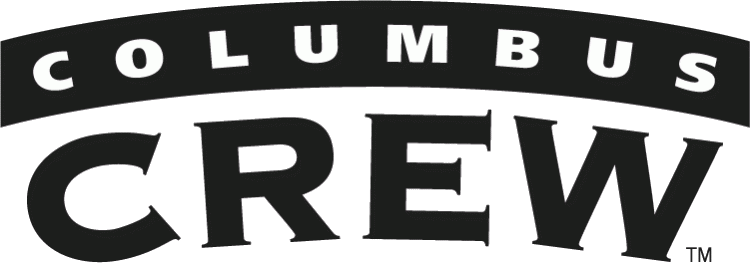
- Investor-operators: Clark Hunt; Dan Hunt; Lamar Hunt Jr. Sharron Hunt Munson; Ron Pizzuti and a group of local investors
- Head Coach: Sigi Schmid
- Stadium: Columbus Crew Stadium
- Major League Soccer: Conference: 6th Overall: 9th
- MLS Cup playoffs: Did not qualify
- U.S. Open Cup: Qualification semifinals
- Top goalscorer: League: Alejandro Moreno (7); All: Alejandro Moreno (7)
- Highest home attendance: 24,300 (4/14 v. LA)
- Lowest home attendance: 5,424(4/24 v. LA)
- Average home league attendance: 15,230 (67.5%)
- Biggest win: CLB 2–0 RSL (7/7); CLB 2–0 TOR (7/22)
- Biggest defeat: NY 4-0 CLB (5/19)
Home colors	Away colors

The 2007 Columbus Crew season was the club's 12th season of existence and their 12th consecutive season in Major League Soccer, the top flight of soccer in the United States and Canada. The first match of the season was on April 7 against New York Red Bulls. It was the second season under head coach Sigi Schmid. Columbus also competed in the U.S. Open Cup but failed to qualify for the MLS Cup Playoffs.

Although the Crew faced FC Dallas in the regular season, control of the inaugural edition of the Lamar Hunt Pioneer Cup was decided in the preseason. Columbus claimed a 3–0 victory and hoisted the cup for the first time. The Crew were eliminated in the U.S. Open Cup qualification semifinals by Los Angeles Galaxy and finished three points out of a spot in the MLS Cup Playoffs, the third consecutive season without a playoff berth for Columbus.

== Background ==
In the 2006 season the Crew finished sixth place in the East, finished last in the Supporters' Shield table, and failed to qualify for the U.S. Open Cup or the CONCACAF Champions' Cup. Columbus lost defender Ritchie Kotschau to expansion team Toronto FC, but he would be replaced by 2007 MLS SuperDraft second-round selection Brad Evans. Coach Sigi Schmid would also bring in Danny O'Rourke, Robbie Rogers, Alejandro Moreno, William Hesmer, and the team's very first Designated Player, Guillermo Barros Schelotto.

The 2007 season was ultimately unsuccessful, but would be a rebuilding year for Columbus in preparation for the 2008 season, in which they would win both the Supporters' Shield and MLS Cup.

== Roster ==
As of October 9, 2007

Note: Flags indicate national team as defined under FIFA eligibility rules; some limited exceptions apply. Players may hold more than one non-FIFA nationality.

No.	Pos.	Nation	Player
1	GK	USA	William Hesmer
2	DF	USA	Frankie Hejduk (captain)
3	DF	USA	Brad Evans
4	DF	USA	Rusty Pierce
5	DF	USA	Danny O'Rourke
6	DF	CHI	Marcos González (INT)
7	FW	ARG	Guillermo Barros Schelotto (INT)
8	DF	NZL	Duncan Oughton
9	FW	USA	Jason Garey
10	FW	VEN	Alejandro Moreno
11	MF	USA	Ned Grabavoy
12	MF	USA	Eddie Gaven
13	DF	USA	Andrew Peterson (DEV)
14	DF	USA	Chad Marshall
15	MF	BRA	Stefani Miglioranzi
16	FW	SLE	Kei Kamara (GA; DEV)

No.	Pos.	Nation	Player
18	GK	PUR	Bill Gaudette
19	DF	USA	Robbie Rogers (GA; DEV)
20	DF	USA	Tim Ward (GA; DEV)
21	MF	USA	Brandon Moss
22	MF	SCO	Adam Moffat
23	DF	VIN	Ezra Hendrickson
24	DF	USA	Jed Zayner (GA; DEV)
25	DF	BRA	Ricardo Virtuoso (INT)
26	FW	CRC	Andy Herron (INT)
27	DF	USA	Ryan Junge (DEV)
28	FW	ENG	Ben Hunter (INT; DEV)
29	MF	TTO	Andrei Pacheco (INT; DEV)
30	GK	USA	Andy Gruenebaum (DEV)
31	DF	USA	Leonard Griffin
34	MF	USA	Jacob Thomas

== Technical Staff ==
Position	Staff
President/General Manager	(United States) Mark McCullers
Head Coach	(Germany) Sigi Schmid
Assistant Coach	(Poland) Robert Warzycha
Assistant Coach	(United States) Mike Lapper
Assistant Coach	(Russia) Vadim Kirillov
Strength and Conditioning Coach	(United States) Steve Tashjian
Head Trainer	(United States) Jason Mathews
Team Manager	(United States) Tucker Walther
Equipment Manager	(United States) Rusty Wummel

== Non-competitive ==
=== Preseason ===
The Crew started preseason in Columbus and played games in Florida, Arizona, Texas, California and North Carolina before returning to Ohio. The Crew brought in the following trialists during training camp: Juan Cobián

Unsigned draft picks Aaron Chandler, Ryan Junge, Tonci Skroce and Teddy Niziolek also joined the team for preseason.

February 11 Friendly	Columbus Crew	4-2	D.C. United	Bradenton, FL
10:00 AM EST	Kamara; Chandler	Report	Emilio 14', Moreno 30'; Gomez 45'	Stadium: IMG Academy
Note: 120 minute scrimmage

February 13 Friendly	Columbus Crew	0-0	Chicago Fire	Bradenton, FL
10:00 AM EST		Report		Stadium: IMG Academy

February 15 Tom Fitzgerald Memorial Soccer Festival	Columbus Crew	2-1	Real Salt Lake	Tampa, FL
	Oughton 59'; Chandler 64'	Report	Harris 12'	Stadium: University of South Florida

February 16 Friendly	Columbus Crew	1-0	Kansas City Wizards	Bradenton, FL
	Grabavoy 50' (pen.)	Report		Stadium: IMG Academy

February 18 Friendly	Columbus Crew	4-1	FC Dallas	Phoenix, AZ
	Kamara 12', 30', 58'; Daniels 14' (o.g.)	Report	McCarty 48'	Stadium: Grand Canyon University soccer stadium Attendance: 3,364; Referee: Richard Herron

February 21 Friendly	Columbus Crew	3-1	Indios de Ciudad Juárez	Phoenix, AZ
	Ngwenya 49'; Garey 68'; Virtuoso 82'	Report	31'	Stadium: Grand Canyon University soccer stadium

March 11 Lamar Hunt Pioneer Cup	FC Dallas	0-3	Columbus Crew	Frisco, TX
6:00 PM EST		Report	Ngwenya 58'; Kamara 62'; Chandler 86'	Stadium: Pizza Hut Park; Attendance: 6,525

March 15 Friendly	UC Santa Barbara Gauchos	1-4	Columbus Crew	Santa Barbara, CA
10:00 PM EST	82'	Report	Oughton 30'; Ngwenya 35'; Garey 67'; Rogers 70'	Stadium: Harder Stadium

March 16 Friendly	UC Irvine Anteaters	0-2	Columbus Crew	Irvine, CA
10:00 PM EST		Report	Garey 30'; Chandler 70'	Stadium: Anteater Stadium

March 18 Friendly	Los Angeles Galaxy	1-1	Columbus Crew	Santa Clarita, CA
8:00 PM EST	Martino 8'	Report	Grabavoy 49' (pen.)	Stadium: College of the Canyons Cougar Stadium; Attendance: 5,900

March 24 Friendly	Columbus Crew	1-0	Indiana Hoosiers	Columbus, OH
	Evans 64'	Report		Stadium: Bernlohr Stadium

March 28 Friendly	Wake Forest Demon Deacons	1-0	Columbus Crew	Winston-Salem, NC
7:00 PM EST		Report	Thomas 51'	Stadium: W. Dennie Spry Soccer Stadium

March 31 Friendly	Columbus Crew	0-0	Kansas City Wizards	Winston-Salem, NC
7:00 PM EST	Hendrickson (yellow card) 27'; Pierce (yellow card) 67'	Report	Arnaud (yellow card) 34'	Stadium: W. Dennie Spry Soccer Stadium

=== Midseason ===
May 2 Connor Senn Memorial Game	Ohio State Buckeyes	1-0	Columbus Crew	Columbus, OH
7:00 PM EST	Magill	Report		Stadium: Jesse Owens Memorial Stadium; Attendance: 2,053

May 30 Friendly	Michigan Bucks	0-3	Columbus Crew	Berkley, MI
7:30 PM EST		Report	Gaven 25' (pen.); Kamara 29', 40'	Stadium: Hurley Field

July 28 Friendly	Columbus Crew	1–3	Aston Villa	Columbus, OH
7:30 PM EST	Garey 76'	Report	Young 8'; Barry 11'; Moore 90+1'	Stadium: Columbus Crew Stadium; Attendance: 10,317

July 31 Friendly	Cleveland City Stars	1-2	Columbus Crew	Cleveland, OH
7:00 PM EDT	Leibbrandt 47'	Report	Garey 8'; Peterson 20'	Stadium: Krenzler Field; Referee: Jason Krnac; Assistant referees: Mladen Herceg; John Safer; Fourth official: Jeffrey Mellen

=== Postseason ===
Damian Blackburn and Jack Stewart were rostered as guest players against Tecos UAG

November 13 Friendly	Columbus Crew	2–0	Tecos UAG	Columbus, OH
7:00 PM EST	Moffat 24'; Moreno 50'	Report		Stadium: Columbus Crew Stadium; Attendance: 5,430

== Competitive ==
=== Overview ===
Competition	First match	Last match	Starting round	Final position	Record							
Competition	First match	Last match	Starting round	Final position	Pld	W	D	L	GF	GA	GD	Win %
Major League Soccer	April 7, 2007	October 20, 2007	Matchday 1	9th	30	9	10	11	39	44	−5	30.00
U.S. Open Cup	April 24, 2007	April 24, 2007	Qualification Semifinals	Qualification Semifinals	1	0	0	1	0	1	−1	0.00
Total					31	9	10	12	39	45	−6	29.03

Source: Competitions

=== MLS ===
==== Standings ====
===== Eastern Conference =====
Pos	Team	Pld	W	L	T	GF	GA	GD	Pts	Qualification
3	New York Red Bulls	30	12	11	7	47	45	+2	43	Qualification for the conference semifinals
4	Chicago Fire	30	10	10	10	31	36	−5	40	Qualification for the conference semifinals
5	Kansas City Wizards	30	11	12	7	45	45	0	40	Qualification for the conference semifinals
6	Columbus Crew	30	9	11	10	39	44	−5	37	
7	Toronto FC	30	6	17	7	25	49	−24	25	

Source: MLS

===== Overall table =====
Pos	Team	Pld	W	L	T	GF	GA	GD	Pts
7	Chicago Fire	30	10	10	10	31	36	−5	40
8	Kansas City Wizards	30	11	12	7	45	45	0	40
9	Columbus Crew	30	9	11	10	39	44	−5	37
10	Colorado Rapids	30	9	13	8	29	34	−5	35
11	LA Galaxy	30	9	14	7	38	48	−10	34

Source: MLS
Rules for classification: 1) points; 2) head-to-head record; 3) goal difference; 4) number of goals scored

==== Results summary ====
Overall								Home						Away					
Pld	Pts	W	L	T	GF	GA	GD	W	L	T	GF	GA	GD	W	L	T	GF	GA	GD
30	37	9	11	10	39	44	−5	5	5	5	17	17	0	4	6	5	22	27	−5

Source: MLS standings
Pld = Matches played; Pts = Points; W = Matches won; T = Matches tied; L = Matches lost; GF = Goals for; GA = Goals against; GD = Goal difference

==== Results by round ====
Round	1	2	3	4	5	6	7	8	9	10	11	12	13	14	15	16	17	18	19	20	21	22	23	24	25	26	27	28	29	30
Stadium	A	H	A	A	A	H	H	A	H	H	A	H	A	H	H	A	A	H	H	H	A	H	A	H	H	A	H	A	H	A
Result	T	T	T	W	L	T	L	T	L	L	T	W	W	W	T	W	L	W	T	L	L	T	T	L	L	W	L	L	W	W

Source: schedule
A = Away; H = Home; W = Win; L = Loss; T = Tie

==== Match results ====
April 7 1	Columbus Crew	0–0	New York Red Bulls	Columbus, OH
7:00 PM EDT		Report	Kovalenko (yellow card) 19'	Stadium: Columbus Crew Stadium; Attendance: 13,782; Referee: Kevin Stott; Assistant referees: Rob Fereday; Adam Wienckowski; Fourth official: Andrew Chapin

April 14 2	Real Salt Lake	0–0	Columbus Crew	Salt Lake City, UT
6:00 PM EDT	Talley (yellow card) 30'; Torres (yellow card) 70'; Stewart (yellow card) 88'	Report	O'Rourke (yellow card) 76'; Herron (yellow card) 90+2'	Stadium: Rice–Eccles Stadium; Attendance: 16,157; Referee: Tim Weyland; Assistant referees: Fabio Tovar; Paul Scott; Fourth official: Ricardo Salazar

April 19 3	Columbus Crew	2–2	New England Revolution	Columbus, OH
7:00 PM EDT	Grabavoy 8', (yellow card) 49'; Hejduk (yellow card) 82'; Kamara 86'; Pierce (yellow card) 90+4'	Report	Dorman 10'; Twellman 38'; Heaps (yellow card) 42'; Larentowicz (yellow card) 76'	Stadium: Columbus Crew Stadium; Attendance: 13,290; Referee: Ricardo Salazar; Assistant referees: Craig Lowry; George Vergara; Fourth official: Mikael Lundqvist

April 28 4	Columbus Crew	1–0	D.C. United	Columbus, OH
7:30 PM EDT	Hendrickson 28', (yellow card) 52'; Garey (yellow card) 89'	Report	Carroll (yellow card) 24'; Emílio (yellow card) 38'; Fred (yellow card) 56'; Gómez (yellow card) 58'	Stadium: Columbus Crew Stadium; Attendance: 13,572; Referee: Jorge Gonzalez; Assistant referees: Greg Barkey; Anthony Vasoli; Fourth official: Hilario Grajeda

May 5 5	Kansas City Wizards	1–0	Columbus Crew	Kansas City, MO
1:00 PM EDT	Zavagnin (yellow card) 35'; Johnson (yellow card) 89'; Burciaga 90'	Report	Virtuoso (yellow card) 8'; Hejduk (yellow card) 27'; O'Rourke (yellow card) 30'; Grabavoy (yellow card) 89'	Stadium: Arrowhead Stadium; Attendance: 7,426; Referee: Jair Marrufo; Assistant referees: Thomas Supple; Kyle Borne; Fourth official: Mark Geiger

May 12 6	Columbus Crew	1–1	Chivas USA	Columbus, OH
7:30 PM EDT	González (yellow card) 1'; Grabavoy 18'; Hendrickson (yellow card) 54'; Pierce (yellow card) 70'	Report	Razov 2'; Marsch (yellow card) 13'; Kljestan (yellow card) 49'; Suárez (yellow card) 75'; Vaughn (yellow card) 82'; Hernandez (yellow card) 87'	Stadium: Columbus Crew Stadium; Attendance: 12,545; Referee: Jorge Gonzalez; Assistant referees: Kermit Quisenberry; Peter Balciunas; Fourth official: Jozef Batko

May 19 7	New York Red Bulls	4–0	Columbus Crew	East Rutherford, NJ
7:30 PM EDT	Wolyniec 17'; Mathis 51'; Ángel 61'; Caccavale 90'	Report	Pierce (yellow card) 55'	Stadium: Giants Stadium; Attendance: 10,321; Referee: Richard Heron; Assistant referees: Bill Dittmar; George Vergara; Fourth official: Lee Suckle

May 26 8	Columbus Crew	2–2	Toronto FC	Columbus, OH
7:30 PM EDT	Herron 2', (yellow card) 3', (goal) 36'; Barros Schelotto (yellow card) 78'	Report	Dichio 27'; Brennan 49', (yellow card) 89'	Stadium: Columbus Crew Stadium; Attendance: 11,755; Referee: Ricardo Salazar; Assistant referees: Jose Corro; Peter Balciunas; Fourth official: Brian Hall

June 3 9	Chicago Fire	3–2	Columbus Crew	Bridgeview, IL
7:00 PM EDT	Curtin 25', (yellow card) 49' (yellow-red card) 68'; Robinson (yellow card) 38'; Segares (yellow card) 51'; Oliveira 61'; Barrett 78'	Report	Pierce (yellow card) 29'; Oughton 38'; O'Rourke (yellow card) 57' (yellow-red card) 86'; Hejduk (yellow card) 60'; Marshall 84'	Stadium: Toyota Park; Attendance: 10,115; Referee: Mark Geiger; Assistant referees: Corey Rockwell; Adam Wienckowski; Fourth official: Richard Heron

June 10 10	Columbus Crew	1–2	Houston Dynamo	Columbus, OH
5:00 PM EDT	Moreno 25'; Barros Schelotto (yellow card) 27'	Report	Ngwenya 22', (yellow card) 43'; Marshall 29' (o.g.)	Stadium: Columbus Crew Stadium; Attendance: 12,661; Referee: Kevin Stott; Assistant referees: George Vergara; Frank Anderson; Fourth official: Jorge Gonzalez

June 16 11	New England Revolution	3–3	Columbus Crew	Foxborough, MA
6:30 PM EDT	Cristman 13', 32'; Noonan 17'; Dorman (yellow card) 87'	Report	Rogers 9'; Pierce (yellow card) 40'; O'Rourke (yellow card) 43'; Barros Schelotto 45'; Moreno 85'	Stadium: Gillette Stadium; Attendance: 22,412; Referee: Ramon Hernandez; Assistant referees: Kermit Quisenberry; Corey Rockwell; Fourth official: Alex Prus

June 20 12	Columbus Crew	2–1	Kansas City Wizards	Columbus, OH
7:30 PM EDT	Gaven 56'; Miglioranzi 61'	Report	Jewsbury 90'	Stadium: Columbus Crew Stadium; Attendance: 10,254; Referee: Brian Hall; Assistant referees: Kermit Quisenberry; Bill Dittmar; Fourth official: Jozef Batko

June 23 13	Los Angeles Galaxy	2–3	Columbus Crew	Carson, CA
10:30 PM EDT	Harmse (yellow card) 21'; Jaqua (yellow card) 34'; Roberts (yellow card) 61'; Glinton 66'; Buddle 90'	Report	Marshall 15'; Hendrickson (red card) 29'; O'Rourke (yellow card) 54'; Grabavoy 58'; Moreno (yellow card) 81', (goal) 84'	Stadium: The Home Depot Center; Attendance: 20,109; Referee: Michael Kennedy; Assistant referees: Greg Barkey; Kyle Borne; Fourth official: Abbey Okulaja

June 30 14	Columbus Crew	1–0	New York Red Bulls	Columbus, OH
8:00 PM EDT	Kamara 69'	Report	Mendes (yellow card) 90+3'	Stadium: Columbus Crew Stadium; Attendance: 11,435; Referee: Jozef Batko; Assistant referees: Craig Lowry; Rob Fereday; Fourth official: Ricardo Salazar

July 4 15	Colorado Rapids	0–0	Columbus Crew	Commerce City, CO
9:30 PM EDT	Erpen (yellow card) 71'	Report		Stadium: Dick's Sporting Goods Park; Attendance: 18,086; Referee: Kevin Stott; Assistant referees: Craig Lowry; Jose Corro; Fourth official: Ben Chouaf

July 7 16	Columbus Crew	2–0	Real Salt Lake	Columbus, OH
7:30 PM EDT	Barros Schelotto 76' (pen.); Gaven 80'	Report	Talley (yellow card) 7'; Ballouchy (yellow card) 55'; Eskandarian (yellow card) 77' (yellow-red card) 90+3'; Kipré (yellow card) 78'	Stadium: Columbus Crew Stadium; Attendance: 14,203; Referee: Alex Prus; Assistant referees: Steve Taylor; Michael Salyers; Fourth official: Mikael Lundqvist

July 14 17	Chivas USA	2–1	Columbus Crew	Carson, CA
10:30 PM EDT	Razov 19'; Gaven 69' (o.g.); Galindo (yellow card) 76'	Report	Miglioranzi 23'	Stadium: Home Depot Center; Attendance: 10,214; Referee: Brian Hall; Assistant referees: Emiliano Monje; Frank Anderson; Fourth official: Miguel Chicas

July 22 18	Columbus Crew	2–0	Toronto FC	Columbus, OH
5:00 PM EDT	Schelotto 50', 56'	Report	Marshall (yellow card) 45+1'	Stadium: Columbus Crew Stadium; Attendance: 13,479; Referee: Michael Kennedy; Assistant referees: Thomas Supple; Michael Salyers; Fourth official: Mikael Lundqvist

August 4 19	Chicago Fire	0–0	Columbus Crew	Bridgeview, IL
8:30 PM EDT	Gutiérrez (yellow card) 13'; Brown (yellow card) 27'; Soumaré (yellow card) 86'	Report	Szetela (yellow card) 30'; Miglioranzi (yellow card) 44'; González (yellow card) 60'	Stadium: Toyota Park; Attendance: 20,538; Referee: Terry Vaughn; Assistant referees: Nate Clement; Anthony Vasoli; Fourth official: Ricardo Salazar

August 11 20	FC Dallas	3–2	Columbus Crew	Frisco, TX
8:30 PM EDT	Ricchetti (yellow card) 29'; Álvarez 60'; Ruíz 80'; Saragosa (red card) 81'; Goodson 90'	Report	González 6'; Moreno (yellow card) 45+3'; O'Rourke (yellow card) 57'; Herron 74' (pen.)	Stadium: Pizza Hut Park; Attendance: 14,818; Referee: Jorge Gonzalez; Assistant referees: Corey Rockwell; David Bragg; Fourth official: Ricardo Salazar

August 18 21	Columbus Crew	0–2	D.C. United	Columbus, OH
7:30 PM EDT	Miglioranzi (yellow card) 31'; Hejduk (yellow card) 42'	Report	Fred 52'; Emílio 63'; Carroll (yellow card) 82'	Stadium: Columbus Crew Stadium; Attendance: 21,639; Referee: Richard Heron; Assistant referees: Kermit Quisenberry; Sean Hurd; Fourth official: Michael Kennedy

August 25 22	Houston Dynamo	1–1	Columbus Crew	Houston, TX
8:30 PM EDT	Jaqua (yellow card) 26', (goal) 80'; Mullan (yellow card) 84'	Report	Moreno 17'; González (yellow card) 33' (yellow-red card) 38'; Barros Schelotto (yellow card) 73'; Miglioranzi (yellow card) 90'	Stadium: Robertson Stadium; Attendance: 14,351; Referee: Abiodun Okulaja; Assistant referees: Fabio Tovar; Corey Rockwell; Fourth official: Jair Marrufo

September 2 23	Columbus Crew	1–1	Colorado Rapids	Columbus, OH
3:00 PM EDT	Gaven 45+1'; Oughton (yellow card) 88'	Report	Erpen (yellow card) 26'; Casey (yellow card) 49', (goal) 84'; Ihemelu (yellow card) 62'; Ballouchy (yellow card) 88'	Stadium: Columbus Crew Stadium; Attendance: 16,036; Referee: Tim Weyland; Assistant referees: Rob Fereday; Craig Lowry; Fourth official: Mikael Lundqvist

September 8 24	Columbus Crew	0–1	Chicago Fire	Columbus, OH
7:30 PM EDT	Barros Schelotto (yellow card) 8'; Hejduk (yellow card) 37'; Oughton (yellow card) 68'	Report	Robinson (yellow card) 27'; Wanchope 65'; Soumaré (yellow card) 78'	Stadium: Columbus Crew Stadium; Attendance: 19,983; Referee: Jozef Batko; Assistant referees: George Gansner; Michael Salyers; Fourth official: Richard Heron

September 15 25	Kansas City Wizards	3–2	Columbus Crew	Kansas City, MO
8:00 PM EDT	Sealy 31', 90+4'; Morsink (yellow card) 45'; Johnson 90+3' (pen.)	Report	Gaven (yellow card) 36'; González (yellow card) 48'; Moreno 65'; Herron 67'; Oughton (yellow card) 72'; Hesmer (yellow card) 87'	Stadium: Arrowhead Stadium; Attendance: 10,217; Referee: Andrew Chapin; Assistant referees: Jose Corro; George Vergara; Fourth official: Hilario Grajeda

September 22 26	Toronto FC	1–2	Columbus Crew	Toronto, ON
3:30 PM EDT	Cañizalez 2'	Report	Hejduk 61'; Thomas 83'	Stadium: BMO Field; Attendance: 20,127; Referee: Steven Depiero; Assistant referees: Simon Fearn; Amato DeLuca; Fourth official: Carol-Anne Chenard

September 30 27	Columbus Crew	1–2	Los Angeles Galaxy	Columbus, OH
5:00 PM EDT	Moreno 2'	Report	Roberts 13'; Tudela (yellow card) 14'; Martino 16', (yellow card) 67'	Stadium: Columbus Crew Stadium; Attendance: 24,300; Referee: Kevin Stott; Assistant referees: Nate Clement; Peter Balciunas; Fourth official: Hilario Grajeda

October 6 28	Columbus Crew	1–3	FC Dallas	Columbus, OH
7:30 PM EDT	Gaven 31'; Hendrickson (yellow card) 71'	Report	Denílson (yellow card) 40'; Álvarez 48'; Pitchkolan (yellow card) 61'; Thompson 86', 89'	Stadium: Columbus Crew Stadium; Attendance: 19,517; Referee: Mark Geiger; Assistant referees: Anthony Vasoli; Nate Clement; Fourth official: Hilario Grajeda

October 13 29	New England Revolution	2–3	Columbus Crew	Foxborough, MA
7:30 PM EDT	Riley (yellow card) 16'; Twellman 26'; Thompson (yellow card) 59'; Ralston 83'	Report	Gaven 61'; Barros Schelotto (yellow card) 74', (goal) 86'; Miglioranzi 77'; Moreno (yellow card) 90+1'	Stadium: Gillette Stadium; Attendance: 22,295; Referee: Michael Kennedy; Assistant referees: Greg Barkey; Thomas Supple; Fourth official: Abbey Okulaja

October 20 30	D.C. United	2–3	Columbus Crew	Washington, D.C.
7:30 PM EDT	Namoff (yellow card) 18'; Gómez 89', 90+3' (pen.); Burch (yellow card) 80'	Report	Rogers 21', 90+1'; Moreno 66'	Stadium: Robert F. Kennedy Memorial Stadium; Attendance: 23,149; Referee: Terry Vaughn; Assistant referees: Rob Fereday; Bill Dittmar; Fourth official: Jorge Gonzalez

=== MLS Cup Playoffs ===
The Columbus Crew failed to qualify for the playoffs in this season.

=== U.S. Open Cup ===
April 24 Qualification Semifinals	Columbus Crew (MLS) (Ohio)	0–1	(California) Los Angeles Galaxy (MLS)	Columbus, OH
7:30 PM EDT	Oughton (yellow card) 49'; Ward (yellow card) 81'	Report	Jaqua 17'; Harmse (yellow card) 71'	Stadium: Columbus Crew Stadium; Attendance: 5,424; Referee: Erich Simmons; Assistant referees: Mikael Lundqvist; Michael Szymanski; Fourth official: Jeffrey Mellen

== Reserve League ==
=== Overall table ===
Pos	Club	Pld	W	L	T	GF	GA	GD	Pts
1	Colorado Rapids Reserves (C)	10	7	0	3	22	8	+14	24
2	Chivas USA Reserves	11	6	3	2	25	23	+2	20
2	New England Revolution Reserves	12	6	4	2	20	14	+6	20
4	Kansas City Wizards Reserves	12	6	5	1	22	19	+3	19
5	D.C. United Reserves	12	4	3	5	16	12	+4	17
6	FC Dallas Reserves	12	4	4	4	17	18	−1	16
7	Columbus Crew Reserves	11	4	4	3	17	14	+3	15
7	New York Red Bulls Reserves	9	5	4	0	14	15	−1	15
7	Real Salt Lake Reserves	11	5	6	0	19	17	+2	15
10	Toronto FC Reserves	12	3	5	4	14	19	−5	13
11	Houston Dynamo Reserves	12	3	6	3	16	21	−5	12
12	Chicago Fire Reserves	11	2	6	3	12	19	−7	9
13	Los Angeles Galaxy Reserves	11	2	7	2	14	29	−15	8

=== Match results ===
April 29 1	Columbus Crew	1-2	D.C. United	Obetz, OH
	Oughton 35', (yellow card) 69'; Moss (yellow card) 58'	Report	Addlery 30', 50'; Erpen (yellow card) 43'; Mediate (yellow card) 69'	Stadium: Crew Training Center

May 6 2	Kansas City Wizards	0-1	Columbus Crew	Overland Park, KS
5:00 PM EDT	Kraus (yellow card) 36'; Lowery (yellow card) 59'	Report	Oughton (yellow card) 28'; Chandler (yellow card) 57'; Martin 70'	Stadium: Sprint Campus; Referee: Mark Geiger; Assistant referees: Adam Dolezal; Doug Wolff; Fourth official: Cory Kramer

May 13 3	Columbus Crew	1-1	Chivas USA	Obetz, OH
	Marshall 15'; Oughton (yellow card) 47'	Report	López (yellow card) 30'; Borja 49'; Corona (yellow card) 73'; Brooks (yellow card) 84'	Stadium: Crew Training Center

May 20 4	New York Red Bulls	2-1	Columbus Crew	Montclair, NJ
	Karcz (yellow card) 33'; Ikangu (yellow card) 54'; Laventure 67'; Ubiparipović 70'	Report	Kamara 78'	Stadium: Sprague Field

June 4 5	Chicago Fire	0-1	Columbus Crew	Bridgeview, IL
	Sobolewski (yellow card) 52'	Report	Kamara 61'; Zayner (yellow card) 69'	Stadium: Toyota Park; Referee: Jose Gesundheit; Assistant referees: Mark Gorak; George Ghawi; Fourth official: Khalaf Allatayfeh

June 17 6	New England Revolution	2-1	Columbus Crew	Foxborough, MA
	Gonzales 25', (yellow card) 14' (yellow-red card) 68'; Igwe 37'	Report	Pierce (yellow card) 32'; Moodie (yellow card) 51'; Caso 86'	Stadium: Gillette Stadium

July 1 7	New York Red Bulls	Cancelled	Columbus Crew	Montclair, NJ
				Stadium: Sprague Field

August 12 8	FC Dallas	2-3	Columbus Crew	Frisco, TX
10:00 AM EDT	Rhine (yellow card) 15', (goal) 84'; Gbandi 42'	Report	Kamara 22'; Zayner (yellow card) 26'; Pierce (yellow card) 60'; Herron 77'; Rogers 80'; Hendrickson (yellow card) 81'	Stadium: Pizza Hut Park

September 2 9	Columbus Crew	2-2	Colorado Rapids	Obetz, OH
5:30 PM EDT	Garey 38', 45+'; Ward (yellow card) 48'; Turizo (yellow card) 59'	Report	Keel (yellow card) 45+'; Cancela 68'; LaBrocca (yellow card) 75'; DiRaimondo (yellow card) 86'; Colaluca 83'	Stadium: Crew Stadium

September 16 10	Kansas City Wizards	2-0	Columbus Crew	Kansas City, MO
10:00 AM EDT	Pore 15', 72'; Wahl (yellow card) 85'	Report	Herron (yellow card) 27'	Stadium: Swope Park Training Center; Referee: Brad Clem; Assistant referees: George Major; Younasse Tarbouni; Fourth official: Jordan Shaw

September 30 11	Columbus Crew	5-0	Los Angeles Galaxy	Obetz, OH
7:30 PM EDT	Virtuoso 20', (yellow card) 33', (goal) 89'; Kamara 30'; Rogers 55'; Ward 74'	Report	Denton (yellow card) 33'	Stadium: Crew Training Center; Referee: Rizal Milliken; Assistant referees: Jason Krnac; Michael Szymanski; Fourth official: Jeffrey Mellen

October 14 12	New England Revolution	1-1	Columbus Crew	Foxborough, MA
10:00 AM EDT	Dorman (yellow card) 58'; Mansally 86'	Report	Grabavoy (yellow card) 28'; Hunter 46'	Stadium: Gillette Stadium; Referee: Sean Nolly; Assistant referees: Claudio Badea; Daniel Herstoff

== Statistics ==
=== Appearances and goals ===
Under "Apps" for each section, the first number represents the number of starts, and the second number represents appearances as a substitute.

No.	Pos	Nat	Player	Total		MLS		U.S. Open Cup	
No.	Pos	Nat	Player	Apps	Goals	Apps	Goals	Apps	Goals
1	GK	(United States) USA	William Hesmer	20	0	20+0	0	0+0	0
2	DF	(United States) USA	Frankie Hejduk	24	0	24+0	0	0+0	0
3	DF	(United States) USA	Brad Evans	4	0	1+3	0	0+0	0
4	DF	(United States) USA	Rusty Pierce	21	0	19+2	0	0+0	0
5	DF	(United States) USA	Danny O'Rourke	28	0	27+0	0	1+0	0
6	DF	(Chile) CHI	Marcos González	28	1	27+0	1	1+0	0
7	FW	(Argentina) ARG	Guillermo Barros Schelotto	22	5	19+3	5	0+0	0
8	DF	(New Zealand) NZL	Duncan Oughton	20	1	13+6	1	1+0	0
9	FW	(United States) USA	Jason Garey	11	1	5+6	1	0+0	0
10	FW	(Venezuela) VEN	Alejandro Moreno	25	7	25+0	7	0+0	0
11	MF	(United States) USA	Ned Grabavoy	27	3	24+2	3	0+1	0
12	MF	(United States) USA	Eddie Gaven	28	5	21+6	5	1+0	0
13	DF	(United States) USA	Andrew Peterson	1	0	1+0	0	0+0	0
14	DF	(United States) USA	Chad Marshall	12	2	11+1	2	0+0	0
15	MF	(Brazil) BRA	Stefani Miglioranzi	24	3	17+6	3	1+0	0
16	FW	(Sierra Leone) SLE	Kei Kamara	18	2	4+13	2	0+1	0
18	GK	(Puerto Rico) PUR	Bill Gaudette	1	0	0+0	0	1+0	0
19	DF	(United States) USA	Robbie Rogers	11	3	6+4	3	1+0	0
20	DF	(United States) USA	Tim Ward	7	0	6+0	0	1+0	0
21	MF	(United States) USA	Brandon Moss	1	0	0+0	0	1+0	0
22	MF	(Scotland) SCO	Adam Moffat	1	0	1+0	0	0+0	0
23	FW	(Saint Vincent and the Grenadines) VIN	Ezra Hendrickson	23	1	21+2	1	0+0	0
24	DF	(United States) USA	Jed Zayner	2	0	0+2	0	0+0	0
25	DF	(Brazil) BRA	Ricardo Virtuoso	8	0	5+3	0	0+0	0
26	FW	(Costa Rica) CRC	Andy Herron	19	4	10+8	4	1+0	0
27	DF	(United States) USA	Ryan Junge	1	0	0+1	0	0+0	0
28	FW	(England) ENG	Ben Hunter	0	0	0+0	0	0+0	0
29	MF	(Trinidad and Tobago) TTO	Andrei Pacheco	0	0	0+0	0	0+0	0
30	GK	(United States) USA	Andy Gruenebaum	11	0	10+0	0	0+1	0
31	DF	(United States) USA	Leonard Griffin	0	0	0+0	0	0+0	0
34	MF	(United States) USA	Jacob Thomas	9	1	4+5	1	0+0	0
			Own goal	0	0	-	0	-	0
Players who left Columbus during the season:
10	FW	(Zimbabwe) ZIM	Joseph Ngwenya	6	0	5+0	0	0+1	0
17	MF	(United States) USA	Danny Szetela	7	0	4+2	0	1+0	0
29	FW	(United States) USA	Aaron Chandler	0	0	0+0	0	0+0	0
40	GK	(United States) USA	Kenny Schoeni	0	0	0+0	0	0+0	0

=== Disciplinary record ===
No.	Pos.	Name	MLS		U.S. Open Cup		Total	
No.	Pos.	Name	Yellow card	Red card	Yellow card	Red card	Yellow card	Red card
1	GK	(United States) William Hesmer	1	0	0	0	1	0
2	DF	(United States) Frankie Hejduk	5	0	0	0	5	0
3	DF	(United States) Brad Evans	0	0	0	0	0	0
4	DF	(United States) Rusty Pierce	5	0	0	0	5	0
5	DF	(United States) Danny O'Rourke	6	1	0	0	6	1
6	DF	(Chile) Marcos González	4	1	0	0	4	1
7	FW	(Argentina) Guillermo Barros Schelotto	5	0	0	0	5	0
8	DF	(New Zealand) Duncan Oughton	3	0	1	0	4	0
9	FW	(United States) Jason Garey	1	0	0	0	1	0
10	FW	(Venezuela) Alejandro Moreno	3	0	0	0	3	0
11	MF	(United States) Ned Grabavoy	2	0	0	0	2	0
12	MF	(United States) Eddie Gaven	1	0	0	0	1	0
13	DF	(United States) Andrew Peterson	0	0	0	0	0	0
14	DF	(United States) Chad Marshall	0	0	0	0	0	0
15	MF	(Brazil) Stefani Miglioranzi	3	0	0	0	3	0
16	FW	(Sierra Leone) Kei Kamara	0	0	0	0	0	0
17	MF	(United States) Danny Szetela	0	0	0	0	0	0
18	GK	(Puerto Rico) Bill Gaudette	0	0	0	0	0	0
19	DF	(United States) Robbie Rogers	0	0	0	0	0	0
20	DF	(United States) Tim Ward	0	0	1	0	1	0
21	MF	(United States) Brandon Moss	0	0	0	0	0	0
22	MF	(Scotland) Adam Moffat	0	0	0	0	0	0
23	FW	(Saint Vincent and the Grenadines) Ezra Hendrickson	3	1	0	0	3	1
24	DF	(United States) Jed Zayner	0	0	0	0	0	0
25	DF	(Brazil) Ricardo Virtuoso	1	0	0	0	1	0
26	FW	(Costa Rica) Andy Herron	2	0	0	0	2	0
27	DF	(United States) Ryan Junge	0	0	0	0	0	0
28	FW	(United States) Ben Hunter	0	0	0	0	0	0
29	MF	(Trinidad and Tobago) Andrei Pacheco	0	0	0	0	0	0
30	GK	(United States) Andy Gruenebaum	0	0	0	0	0	0
31	DF	(United States) Leonard Griffin	0	0	0	0	0	0
34	MF	(United States) Jacob Thomas	0	0	0	0	0	0
Players who left Columbus during the season:
10	FW	(Zimbabwe) Joseph Ngwenya	0	0	0	0	0	0
17	MF	(United States) Danny Szetela	1	0	0	0	1	0
29	FW	(United States) Aaron Chandler	0	0	0	0	0	0
40	GK	(United States) Kenny Schoeni	0	0	0	0	0	0

=== Clean sheets ===
No.	Name	MLS	U.S. Open Cup	Total	Games Played
1	(United States) William Hesmer	5	0	5	20
18	(Puerto Rico) Bill Gaudette	0	0	0	1
30	(United States) Andy Gruenebaum	3	0	3	11
Players who left Columbus during the season:
40	(United States) Kenny Schoeni	0	0	0	0

== Reserve League Statistics ==
=== Appearances and goals ===
Under "Apps" for each section, the first number represents the number of starts, and the second number represents appearances as a substitute.

No.	Pos	Nat	Player	Total		MLS Reserve League	
No.	Pos	Nat	Player	Apps	Goals	Apps	Goals
26	FW	(United States) USA	Adrian Balc	1	0	0+1	0
22	FW	(United States) USA	Damion Blackburn	4	0	1+3	0
-	MF	(United States) USA	Taylor Canel	1	0	0+1	0
-	FW	(United States) USA	Mike Caso	1	1	1+0	1
29	FW	(United States) USA	Aaron Chandler	6	0	3+3	0
-	MF	(Romania) ROU	Danny Drăgoi	0	0	0+0	0
3	DF	(United States) USA	Brad Evans	4	0	4+0	0
9	FW	(United States) USA	Jason Garey	6	2	5+1	2
18	GK	(Puerto Rico) PUR	Bill Gaudette	5	0	4+1	0
12	MF	(United States) USA	Eddie Gaven	4	0	3+1	0
6	DF	(Chile) CHI	Marcos González	1	0	1+0	0
11	MF	(United States) USA	Ned Grabavoy	1	0	1+0	0
31	DF	(United States) USA	Leonard Griffin	1	0	1+0	0
30	GK	(United States) USA	Andy Gruenebaum	5	0	5+0	0
23	FW	(Saint Vincent and the Grenadines) VIN	Ezra Hendrickson	1	0	1+0	0
26	FW	(Costa Rica) CRC	Andy Herron	4	1	4+0	1
1	GK	(United States) USA	William Hesmer	1	0	0+1	0
28	FW	(England) ENG	Ben Hunter	3	1	2+1	1
27	DF	(United States) USA	Ryan Junge	9	0	8+1	0
16	FW	(United States) USA	Kei Kamara	8	4	8+0	4
-	DF	(United States) USA	Ritchie Kotschau	1	0	0+1	0
13	DF	(Puerto Rico) PUR	John Krause	4	0	0+4	0
3	MF	(United States) USA	Skelly Kellar	1	0	0+1	0
-	DF	(United States) USA	Ricky Lewis	2	0	0+2	0
14	DF	(United States) USA	Chad Marshall	2	1	2+0	1
32	FW	(United States) USA	Ryan Martin	2	1	0+2	1
15	MF	(Brazil) BRA	Stefani Miglioranzi	6	0	5+1	0
22	MF	(Scotland) SCO	Adam Moffat	2	0	2+0	0
-	DF	(United States) USA	Richard Moodie	1	0	1+0	0
20	MF	(United States) USA	Brandon Moss	4	0	4+0	0
8	DF	(New Zealand) NZL	Duncan Oughton	5	1	5+0	1
29	MF	(Trinidad and Tobago) TTO	Andrei Pacheco	3	0	2+1	0
-	MF	(United States) USA	Raul Palomares	1	0	0+1	0
13	DF	(United States) USA	Andrew Peterson	6	0	6+0	0
4	DF	(United States) USA	Rusty Pierce	3	0	3+0	0
-	MF	(United States) USA	Derek Potteiger	1	0	0+1	0
19	DF	(United States) USA	Robbie Rogers	8	2	7+1	2
-	FW	(United States) USA	David Roman	2	0	1+1	0
40	GK	(United States) USA	Kenny Schoeni	2	0	2+0	0
-	FW	(United States) USA	Jamal Sutton	1	0	1+0	0
17	MF	(United States) USA	Danny Szetela	6	0	6+0	0
-	DF	(United States) USA	Ashleigh Townsend	1	0	0+1	0
28	MF	(Colombia) COL	Christian Turizo	2	0	0+2	0
25	DF	(Brazil) BRA	Ricardo Virtuoso	8	2	8+0	2
20	DF	(United States) USA	Tim Ward	8	1	8+0	1
36	FW	(United States) USA	Dante Washington	1	0	0+1	0
24	DF	(United States) USA	Jed Zayner	10	0	8+2	0
			Own goal	0	0	-	0

=== Disciplinary record ===
No.	Pos.	Name	MLS Reserve League		Total	
No.	Pos.	Name	Yellow card	Red card	Yellow card	Red card
26	FW	(United States) Adrian Balc	0	0	0	0
22	FW	(United States) Damion Blackburn	0	0	0	0
-	MF	(United States) Taylor Canel	0	0	0	0
-	FW	(United States) Mike Caso	0	0	0	0
29	FW	(United States) Aaron Chandler	1	0	1	0
-	MF	(United States) Danny Drăgoi	0	0	0	0
3	DF	(United States) Brad Evans	0	0	0	0
9	FW	(United States) Jason Garey	0	0	0	0
18	GK	(Puerto Rico) Bill Gaudette	0	0	0	0
12	MF	(United States) Eddie Gaven	0	0	0	0
6	DF	(Chile) Marcos González	0	0	0	0
11	MF	(United States) Ned Grabavoy	1	0	1	0
31	DF	(United States) Leonard Griffin	0	0	0	0
30	GK	(United States) Andy Gruenebaum	0	0	0	0
23	FW	(Saint Vincent and the Grenadines) Ezra Hendrickson	1	0	1	0
26	FW	(Costa Rica) Andy Herron	1	0	1	0
1	GK	(United States) William Hesmer	0	0	0	0
28	FW	(England) Ben Hunter	0	0	0	0
13	DF	(United States) Ryan Junge	0	0	0	0
16	FW	(Sierra Leone) Kei Kamara	0	0	0	0
-	DF	(United States) Ritchie Kotschau	0	0	0	0
14	DF	(United States) Chad Marshall	0	0	0	0
32	FW	(United States) Ryan Martin	0	0	0	0
15	MF	(Brazil) Stefani Miglioranzi	0	0	0	0
22	MF	(Scotland) Adam Moffat	0	0	0	0
-	DF	(United States) Richard Moodie	1	0	1	0
20	MF	(United States) Brandon Moss	1	0	1	0
8	DF	(New Zealand) Duncan Oughton	3	0	3	0
29	MF	(Trinidad and Tobago) Andrei Pacheco	0	0	0	0
-	MF	(United States) Raul Palomares	0	0	0	0
13	DF	(United States) Andrew Peterson	0	0	0	0
4	DF	(United States) Rusty Pierce	2	0	2	0
-	MF	(United States) Derek Potteiger	0	0	0	0
19	DF	(United States) Robbie Rogers	0	0	0	0
-	FW	(United States) David Roman	0	0	0	0
40	GK	(United States) Kenny Schoeni	0	0	0	0
-	FW	(United States) Jamal Sutton	0	0	0	0
17	MF	(United States) Danny Szetela	0	0	0	0
-	DF	(United States) Ashleigh Townsend	0	0	0	0
-	MF	(Colombia) Christian Turizo	1	0	1	0
25	DF	(Brazil) Ricardo Virtuoso	1	0	1	0
20	DF	(United States) Tim Ward	1	0	1	0
36	FW	(United States) Dante Washington	0	0	0	0
24	DF	(United States) Jed Zayner	2	0	2	0

=== Clean sheets ===
No.	Name	MLS Reserve League	Total	Games Played
18	(Puerto Rico) Bill Gaudette	1.5	1.5	5
30	(United States) Andy Gruenebaum	0.5	0.5	5
1	(United States) William Hesmer	0	0	1
40	(United States) Kenny Schoeni	1	1	2

== Transfers ==
=== In ===
Pos.	Player	Transferred from	Fee/notes	Date	Source
FW	(Costa Rica) Andy Herron	(United States) Chicago Fire	Traded with a first round draft pick in the 2007 MLS SuperDraft for Ryan Coiner	January 12, 2007	
MF	(Brazil) Stefani Miglioranzi	(United States) Los Angeles Galaxy	Traded for a third round draft pick in the 2008 MLS SuperDraft	January 19, 2007	
DF	(United States) Brad Evans	(United States) UC Irvine Anteaters	Drafted in round 2 of the 2007 MLS SuperDraft	February 28, 2007	
FW	(United States) Aaron Chandler	(United States) San Francisco Dons	Drafted in round 4 of the 2007 MLS SuperDraft. Signed to a developmental contract.	February 28, 2007	
DF	(United States) Robbie Rogers	(Netherlands) SC Heerenveen	Allocated by the league by weighted lottery.	March 9, 2007	
FW	(Argentina) Guillermo Barros Schelotto	(Argentina) Boca Juniors	Contract through 2008	April 19, 2007	
FW	(Venezuela) Alejandro Moreno	(United States) Houston Dynamo	Traded for Joseph Ngwenya	May 9, 2007	
DF	(United States) Ryan Junge	(United States) Cleveland City Stars	Drafted in round 2 of the 2007 MLS Supplemental Draft. Signed to a developmental contract.	May 2007	
FW	(England) Ben Hunter	(United States) North Carolina Tar Heels	Drafted in round 4 of the 2007 MLS SuperDraft. Signed to a developmental contract.	June 2007	
DF	(United States) Andrew Peterson	(United States) Cleveland City Stars	Signed to a developmental contract	July 3, 2007	
MF	(Trinidad and Tobago) Andrei Pacheco	(Trinidad and Tobago) W Connection		August 31, 2007	
DF	(United States) Leonard Griffin	(United States) Portland Timbers	Rights acquired from Chicago Fire for a fourth round pick in the 2008 MLS Supplemental Draft	September 14, 2007	
MF	(Scotland) Adam Moffat	(United States) Cleveland City Stars	Signed via discovery. Signed to a developmental contract.	September 18, 2007	
MF	(United States) Brian Carroll	(United States) D.C. United	Traded for Kei Kamara	November 26, 2007	

=== Loans in ===
Pos.	Player	Parent club	Length/Notes	Beginning	End	Source
GK	(United States) Kenny Schoeni	(United States) MLS Pool		April 27, 2007	May 6, 2007	

=== Out ===
Pos.	Player	Transferred to	Fee/notes	Date	Source
FW	(United States) Ryan Coiner	(United States) Chicago Fire	Traded with a first round draft pick in the 2007 MLS SuperDraft for Andy Herron	January 12, 2007	
GK	(United States) Jonny Walker	Retired		January 26, 2007	
GK	(United States) Jon Busch	(United States) Chicago Fire	Placed on waivers	March 1, 2007	
DF	(Mexico) Ivan Becerra	(United States) Ventura County Fusion	Placed on waivers	March 1, 2007	
DF	(United States) Chris Leitch	(United States) New York Red Bulls	Placed on waivers	March 1, 2007	
MF	(Mexico) José Retiz	(United States) California Victory	Placed on waivers	March 1, 2007	
FW	(United States) Marc Burch	(United States) D.C. United	Traded for a third round draft pick in the 2008 MLS Supplemental Draft	April 4, 2007	
FW	(Zimbabwe) Joseph Ngwenya	(United States) Houston Dynamo	Traded for Alejandro Moreno	May 9, 2007	
FW	(United States) Aaron Chandler	(United States) California Victory	Placed on waivers	July 3, 2007	
MF	(United States) Danny Szetela	(United States) Racing Santander	Transfer, terms undisclosed	August 31, 2007	
MF	(United States) Ned Grabavoy	(United States) San Jose Earthquakes	Selected third in the 2007 MLS Expansion Draft	November 21, 2007	
FW	(United States) Kei Kamara	(United States) San Jose Earthquakes	Traded for Brian Carroll	November 26, 2007	
FW	(England) Ben Hunter	(United States) Richmond Kickers	Placed on waivers	November 28, 2007	
GK	(Puerto Rico) Bill Gaudette	Puerto Rico Islanders	Contract expired	December 31, 2007	
FW	(Costa Rica) Andy Herron	(Costa Rica) Puntarenas F.C.	Contract expired	December 31, 2007	

=== Loans out ===
Pos.	Player	Loanee club	Length/Notes	Beginning	End	Source
FW	(United States) Aaron Chandler	(United States) Cleveland City Stars				
DF	(United States) Ryan Junge	(United States) Cleveland City Stars				
FW	(England) Ben Hunter	(United States) Cleveland City Stars				

=== MLS Draft picks ===
Draft picks are not automatically signed to the team roster. Only those who are signed to a contract will be listed as transfers in. The picks for the Columbus Crew are listed below:

2007 Columbus Crew SuperDraft Picks
Round	Pick	Player	Position	College
2	15	(United States) Brad Evans	MF	UC Irvine
4	41	(United States) Aaron Chandler	FW	San Francisco
4	49	(England) Ben Hunter	DF	North Carolina

2007 Columbus Crew Supplemental Draft Picks
Round	Pick	Player	Position	College
2	15	(United States) Ryan Junge	DF	Creighton
2	23	(Croatia) Tonci Skroce	MF	UIC
4	41	(United States) Teddy Niziolek	MF	Seton Hall
4	50	(United States) Kevin Burns	MF	UConn

== Awards ==
=== MLS Player of the Week ===
Week	Player	Opponent	Link
16	(Argentina) Guillermo Barros Schelotto	Toronto FC	
28	(Argentina) Guillermo Barros Schelotto	New England Revolution	

=== MLS Player of the Month ===
Month	Player	Stats	Link
July	(Argentina) Guillermo Barros Schelotto	3 goals, 1 assist	

=== 2007 MLS All-Star Game ===
Reserves

- FW Guillermo Barros Schelotto
- DF Frankie Hejduk

=== Postseason ===
MLS Fair Play Team Award
MLS Best XI

- FW Guillermo Barros Schelotto

=== Crew Team Awards ===
- Most Valuable Player – Guillermo Barros Schelotto
- Defensive Player of the Year – Frankie Hejduk
- Scoring Champion – Alejandro Moreno
- Man of the Year – Duncan Oughton
- Coach's Award – Ezra Hendrickson
- Newcomer of the Year – Guillermo Barros Schelotto
- Goal of the Year – Alejandro Moreno
- Humanitarian of the Year – Danny O'Rourke
- Hardest Working Man of the Year – Alejandro Moreno
- Comeback Player of the Year – Frankie Hejduk
- Fan's Choice – Guillermo Barros Schelotto
- Fan of the Year – Andrew Goodrich
