= Brenden Fourie =

South African cricketer (born 1970)

Personal information
- Full name: Brenden Craig Fourie
- Born: 13 April 1970 (age 56); East London, Cape Province, South Africa
- Batting: Right-handed
- Bowling: Right-arm fast-medium
- Relatives: Shaun Fourie (brother)

Domestic team information
- Years: Team
- 2001 – 2002: Northamptonshire Cricket Board
- 1994: Leicestershire
- 1993/94: Border B
- 1988/89: Impalas
- 1988/89 – 1998/99: Border

Career statistics
Competition	FC	LA
Matches	51	85
Runs scored	662	323
Batting average	12.49	15.38
100s/50s	–/1	–/–
Top score	57	36*
Balls bowled	9,943	3,777
Wickets	161	97
Bowling average	27.79	28.60
5 wickets in innings	7	1
10 wickets in match	–	–
Best bowling	6/74	5/16
Catches/stumpings	15/–	23/–
- Source: Cricinfo, 20 November 2010

Brenden Craig Fourie (born 13 April 1970) is a former South African cricketer. He was a right-handed batsman who bowled right-arm fast-medium. He was born at East London, Cape Province.

== First-class cricket ==
Fourie made his first-class debut for Border against Eastern Province in the 1988/89 season. From the 1988/89 season to the 1997/98 season, Fourie represented Border in 48 first-class matches, the last of which came against Eastern Province. In his 48 matches for the Border, he scored 638 runs at a batting average of 12.26, with a single half century high score of 57. In the field he took 14 catches. With the ball he took 148 wickets at a bowling average of 28.69, with 7 five wicket hauls and best figures of 6/74.

He also played a single first-class match each for Border B, a Combined Bowl XI and Leicestershire in English county cricket.

== List A cricket ==
In the 1988/89 South African cricket season, Fourie made his debut in List A cricket for the Impalas against Natal in which he took a hat-trick. During that season he represented the Impalas in 7 List A matches, with his final appearance for them coming against Western Province. It was also in that season that he made his debut in that format for Border against Eastern Province. From the 1988/89 season to the 1998/99 season, Fourie represented Border in 74 List A matches, the last of which came against Griqualand West. In these, he scored 282 runs at an average of 16.58, with a high score of 36*. In the field he took 19 catches, while with the ball he claimed 84 wickets at an average of 28.85, with a single five wicket haul which gave him best figures of 5/16.

In 2001, he made his debut for the Northamptonshire Cricket Board in a List A match against the Yorkshire Cricket Board in the 2001 Cheltenham & Gloucester Trophy. From 2001 to 2003, he represented the Board in 4 List A matches, the last of which came against the Yorkshire Cricket Board in the 1st round of the 2003 Cheltenham & Gloucester Trophy which was played in 2003.

== Family ==
His brother, Shaun, played first-class cricket for Border and Border B.

He married Emma Louise Negus on 12 April 2008. They have two daughters, Amy and Sarah.

Education

He went to Selborne Primary and matriculated from Selborne College in 1988. He studied at the University of Port Elizabeth from 1989 to 1992 where he obtained a BA (Ed) Human Movement Science degree.
