= Mark Wolstenholme =

English cricketer

Personal information
- Full name: Mark Andrew Wolstenholme
- Born: 20 October 1979 (age 47); Northampton, Northamptonshire, England
- Batting: Right-handed
- Bowling: Right-arm medium
- Relatives: John Wolstenholme (brother)

Domestic team information
- Years: Team
- 2011–present: Dorset
- 1999–2001: Northamptonshire Cricket Board

Career statistics
Competition	List A
Matches	5
Runs scored	20
Batting average	10.00
100s/50s	0/0
Top score	18
Balls bowled	242
Wickets	9
Bowling average	19.66
5 wickets in innings	1
10 wickets in match	–
Best bowling	5/41
Catches/stumpings	1/–
- Source: Cricinfo, 21 November 2010

Mark Andrew Wolstenholme (born 20 October 1979) is an English cricketer. Wolstenholme is a right-handed batsman who bowls right-arm medium pace. He was born at Northampton, Northamptonshire.

Wolstenholme represented the Northamptonshire Cricket Board in List A cricket. His debut List A match came against Wiltshire in the 1999 NatWest Trophy. From 1999 to 2001, he represented the Board in five List A matches, the last of which came against the Leicestershire Cricket Board in the 1st round of the 2002 Cheltenham & Gloucester Trophy which was played in 2001. In his five List A matches, he scored 20 runs at a batting average of 10.00, with a high score of 18. In the field he took a single catch. With the ball he took 9 wickets at a bowling average of 19.66, with a single five-wicket haul which gave him best figures of 5/41.

He currently plays club cricket for Northampton Saints Cricket Club in the Northamptonshire Cricket League. In 2011, he played Minor counties cricket for Dorset.

His brother, John, played first-class cricket for Northamptonshire and List A cricket for the Northamptonshire Cricket Board.
