= Mark Steele (cricketer) =

English cricketer

Personal information
- Full name: Mark Vincent Steele
- Born: 13 November 1976 (age 49); Corby, Northamptonshire, England
- Batting: Left-handed
- Bowling: Right-arm fast-medium
- Relatives: David Steele (father); Arran Steele (brother); John Steele (uncle)

Domestic team information
- Years: Team
- 1998: Staffordshire

Career statistics
Competition	List A
Matches	1
Runs scored	24
Batting average	24.00
100s/50s	0/0
Top score	24
Catches/stumpings	0/–
- Source: Cricinfo, 14 June 2011

Mark Vincent Steele (born 13 November 1976) is an English former cricketer. Steele was a left-handed batsman who bowled right-arm fast-medium. He was born in Corby, Northamptonshire.

Steele made his debut for Staffordshire in the 1998 Minor Counties Championship against Lincolnshire. Steele played Minor counties cricket for Staffordshire only in 1998, which included 10 Minor Counties Championship matches and 2 MCCA Knockout Trophy matches. In 1998, he made his only List A appearance against Leicestershire in the NatWest Trophy. In this match, he took 2 wickets for 43 runs from 10 overs. With the bat he was dismissed for 25 by Dominic Williamson.

His father, David Steele, played Test cricket for England. His brother, Arran, himself played a single List A match, appearing for the Northamptonshire Cricket Board in 1999. His uncle, John Steele, played first-class cricket for a number of teams.
