= Richard Falkner (cricketer) =

English cricketer (born 1982)

Personal information
- Full name: Richard Edward Falkner
- Born: 13 August 1982 (age 44); Northampton, Northamptonshire, England
- Batting: Right-handed
- Role: Occasional wicketkeeper

Domestic team information
- Years: Team
- 1999–2001: Northamptonshire Cricket Board

Career statistics
Competition	LA
Matches	4
Runs scored	122
Batting average	40.66
100s/50s	–/–
Top score	46
Balls bowled	–
Wickets	–
Bowling average	–
5 wickets in innings	–
10 wickets in match	–
Best bowling	–
Catches/stumpings	1/2
- Source: Cricinfo, 21 November 2010

Richard Edward Falkner (born 13 August 1982) is an English cricketer. Falkner is a right-handed batsman who plays occasionally as a wicketkeeper. He was born at Northampton, Northamptonshire.

Falkner represented the Northamptonshire Cricket Board in List A cricket. His debut List A match came against Wiltshire in the 1999 NatWest Trophy. From 1999 to 2001, he represented the Board in 5 List A matches, the last of which came against the Leicestershire Cricket Board in the 1st round of the 2002 Cheltenham & Gloucester Trophy which was played in 2001. In his 4 List A matches, he scored 122 runs at a batting average of 40.66, with a high score of 46. Behind the stumps he took a single catch and made 2 stumpings.

He currently plays for old northamptonians.
