= Glenn Thompson (cricketer) =

English cricketer

Personal information
- Full name: Glenn Thompson
- Born: 19 November 1969 (age 56)

Domestic team information
- Years: Team
- 1999: Northamptonshire Cricket Board

Career statistics
Competition	LA
Matches	1
Runs scored	–
Batting average	–
100s/50s	–/–
Top score	–
Balls bowled	18
Wickets	1
Bowling average	13.00
5 wickets in innings	–
10 wickets in match	–
Best bowling	1/13
Catches/stumpings	1/–
- Source: Cricinfo, 21 November 2010

Glenn Thompson (born 19 November 1969) is a former English cricketer. Thompson's is a right handed batsman and right hand medium fast bowler.

Thompson represented the Northamptonshire Cricket Board in a single List A match against Wiltshire in the 1999 NatWest Trophy. In his only List A match, he took a single wicket at a cost of 13 runs and in the field he took a single catch.
