= David Austen =

English cricketer

Personal information
- Full name: David Austen

Domestic team information
- Years: Team
- 2000: Northamptonshire Cricket Board

Career statistics
Competition	LA
Matches	1
Runs scored	–
Batting average	–
100s/50s	–/–
Top score	–
Balls bowled	56
Wickets	–
Bowling average	–
5 wickets in innings	–
10 wickets in match	–
Best bowling	–
Catches/stumpings	–/–
- Source: Cricinfo, 21 November 2010

David Austen is a former English cricketer.

Austen represented the Northamptonshire Cricket Board in a single List A match against Northumberland in the 2000 NatWest Trophy.
