= Richard King (English cricketer) =

English cricketer

Personal information
- Full name: Richard Eric King
- Born: 3 January 1984 (age 42); Hitchin, Hertfordshire, England
- Batting: Right-handed
- Bowling: Left-arm medium-fast

Domestic team information
- Years: Team
- 2007: Marylebone Cricket Club
- 2005: Northamptonshire
- 2003-2008: Loughborough UCCE
- 2001-2002: Northamptonshire Cricket Board

Career statistics
Competition	FC	LA
Matches	13	3
Runs scored	207	2
Batting average	12.17	1.00
100s/50s	–/–	–/–
Top score	31	2
Balls bowled	1,191	102
Wickets	17	2
Bowling average	55.35	46.00
5 wickets in innings	–	–
10 wickets in match	–	–
Best bowling	4/34	2/39
Catches/stumpings	1/–	1/–
- Source: Cricinfo, 29 September 2010

Richard Eric King (born 3 January 1984) is a former English cricketer. King was a right-handed batsman who bowled left-arm medium-fast. He was born at Hitchin, Hertfordshire and educated at Bedford Modern School.

King made his debut in List-A cricket for the Northamptonshire Cricket Board against the Leicestershire Cricket Board in the 1st round of the 2002 Cheltenham & Gloucester Trophy which was played in 2001. His second and final List-A match for the Board came in the 1st round of the 2003 Cheltenham & Gloucester Trophy against the Yorkshire Cricket Board which was played in 2002.

King made his first-class debut for Loughborough UCCE against Somerset in 2003. From 2003 to 2008, he represented Loughborough UCCE in 11 first-class matches, the last of which came against Worcestershire. In 2005, King played a single first-class match for Northamptonshire against the touring Bangladeshis. During the same season he also represented the county in a single List-A match against Gloucestershire in the totesport League.

In 2007, King also represented the Marylebone Cricket Club in a single first-class match against Sri Lanka A. In his combined first-class career, he played 13 matches during which he scored 207 runs at a batting average of 12.17, with a high score of 31. With the ball he took 17 wickets at a bowling average of 55.35, with best figures of 4/34. In the 3 List-A matches he played, he scored 2 runs and took 2 wickets at an average of 46.00, with best figures of 2/39.
