= Marcus Steed =

English cricketer

Personal information
- Full name: Marcus Harvey Steed
- Born: 8 May 1975 (age 51); Market Harborough, Leicestershire
- Batting: Right-handed
- Bowling: Right-arm medium-fast

Domestic team information
- Years: Team
- 2001–2002: Northamptonshire Cricket Board
- 2003–2009: Bedfordshire

Career statistics
Competition	List A
Matches	7
Runs scored	55
Batting average	11.00
100s/50s	0/0
Top score	22
Balls bowled	108
Wickets	0
Bowling average	–
5 wickets in innings	–
10 wickets in match	–
Best bowling	–
Catches/stumpings	1/–
- Source: Cricinfo, 21 November 2010

Marcus Harvey Steed (born 8 May 1975) is an English cricketer. Steed is a right-handed batsman who bowls right-arm medium-fast. He was born at Market Harborough, Leicestershire.

Steed initially represented the Northamptonshire Cricket Board, making his debut in List A for them against the Yorkshire Cricket Board in the 2001 Cheltenham & Gloucester Trophy. From 2001 to 2002, he represented the Board in 4 List A matches, he last of which came against the Yorkshire Cricket Board in the 1st round of the 2003 Cheltenham & Gloucester Trophy which was played in 2002.

In 2003, he joined Bedfordshire, making his Minor Counties Championship debut for the county against Cumberland. From 2003 to 2009, he represented the county in 34 Championship matches, the last of which came against Northumberland. His debut for the county in the MCCA Knockout Trophy came against Suffolk in 2003. From 2003 to 2009, he represented the county in 13 Trophy matches, the last of which came against Staffordshire.

Steed also represented Bedfordshire in List A cricket when they were permitted to take part in the Cheltenham & Gloucester Trophy. His first List A match for the county came against Warwickshire in the 3rd round of the 2003 Cheltenham & Gloucester Trophy. He played 2 further List A matches for the county against Cheshire in the 1st round of the 2004 Cheltenham & Gloucester Trophy which was played in 2003 and against Sussex in the 1st round of the 2005 Cheltenham & Gloucester Trophy.

In his career total of 7 List A matches, he scored 55 runs at a batting average of 11.00, with a high score of 22, while in the field he took a single catch. With the ball he bowled 18 wicket-less overs.
