= Jamie Wade =

English cricketer (born 1981)

Personal information
- Full name: James Robert Wade
- Born: 7 May 1981 (age 45); Bedford, Bedfordshire, England
- Batting: Right-handed

Domestic team information
- Years: Team
- 2003–2004: Bedfordshire
- 2001: Northamptonshire Cricket Board
- 1999–2000: Bedfordshire

Career statistics
Competition	LA
Matches	2
Runs scored	50
Batting average	25.00
100s/50s	–/–
Top score	38
Balls bowled	12
Wickets	–
Bowling average	–
5 wickets in innings	–
10 wickets in match	–
Best bowling	–
Catches/stumpings	1/–
- Source: Cricinfo, 20 November 2010

James Robert Wade (born 7 May 1981) is an English cricketer. Wade is a right-handed batsman. He was born in Bedford, Bedfordshire, and educated at Bedford Modern School.

In 1999, Wade made his debut in County Cricket for Bedfordshire in the Minor Counties Championship against Cumberland. From 1999 to 2000, he represented the county in 6 Championship matches. His debut for the county in the MCCA Knockout Trophy came against Norfolk in 1999. He played one further Trophy match in his first stint with the county against Cambridgeshire.

Wade represented the Northamptonshire Cricket Board in 2 List A matches against Northamptonshire in the 2001 Cheltenham & Gloucester Trophy and the Leicestershire Cricket Board in the 1st round of the 2002 Cheltenham & Gloucester Trophy which was played in 2001. In his 2 List A matches he scored 50 runs at a batting average of 25.00, with a high score of 38. In the field he took a single catch.

Wade returned to Bedfordshire in 2003, playing his final Championship appearance against Suffolk. The following season he played his final 2 Trophy matches for the county against Cornwall and Suffolk.

He currently plays club cricket for Teddington Cricket Club in the Middlesex County Cricket League.
