= Marcos González =

Chilean footballer (born 1980)

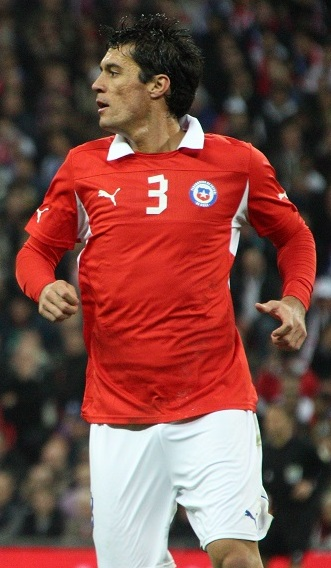
- González with Chile in 2013

Personal information
- Full name: Marcos Andrés González Salazar
- Date of birth: 9 June 1980 (age 46)
- Place of birth: Rio de Janeiro, Brazil
- Height: 1.90 m (6 ft 3 in)
- Position: Centre back

Youth career
- Universidad de Chile

Senior career*
Years	Team	Apps	(Gls)
1999–2003	Universidad de Chile	54	(2)
2002	→ Rangers (loan)	23	(1)
2004	Colón	13	(1)
2005	Palestino	37	(3)
2006–2007	Columbus Crew	45	(2)
2008–2010	Universidad Católica	88	(10)
2011	Universidad de Chile	25	(1)
2012–2014	Flamengo	44	(2)
2014–2015	Unión Española	31	(2)
2015–2017	Necaxa	68	(5)
2017	Palestino	12	(1)
Total		441	(30)

International career^{‡}
2003–2014	Chile	29	(2)
- * Club domestic league appearances and goals as of 5 January 2018 ‡ National team caps and goals as of 5 March 2014

Marcos Andrés González Salazar (born 9 June 1980) is a former professional footballer who played as a defender.

Although born in Brazil, he moved to Santiago aged two and has Chilean citizenship. Noteworthy, he has scored in all the team which he has played.

A Chilean international, he has played during 2006 and 2014 World Cup qualifiers.

== Club career ==
He professionally debuted in 1999 at Universidad de Chile, winning a league title that year whilst the following he achieved another league title and a cup title, all with César Vaccia as coach.

In 2003, González moved to Argentina's Colón de Santa Fe, remaining there two seasons. After a brief spell at Palestino in the second half of 2005, in January 2006 season he chose to sign with the Columbus Crew over Universidad Católica. At the American team, he played two seasons and made 45 appearances, scoring two goals.

Following the 2008 MLS season, González was released from Columbus Crew and then joined the team which he failed to sign in 2006, Universidad Católica, where two years later won the 2010 Primera División title.

In 2011, it was confirmed that González returned to Universidad de Chile. However, he break out into first-team and was a key player in the treble obtention, after winning the Apertura and Clausura titles as well as the Copa Sudamericana.

In 2012, he joined Brazilian club Flamengo. There he helped the team to win the 2013 Copa do Brasil and he stayed at the Mengão until mid-2014. After being released from Flamengo, he returned his homeland and signed for Unión Española to play the 2014–15 Primera División season.

On 11 July 2015, he joined Mexican side Necaxa.

== International career ==
He has represented Chile internationally 29 times.

=== International goals ===
#	Date	Venue	Opponent	Score	Result	Competition
1.	24 April 2013	Mineirão, Belo Horizonte, Brazil	Brazil	0–1	2–2	Friendly
2.	6 September 2013	Estadio Nacional, Santiago, Chile	Venezuela	2–0	3–0	2014 FIFA World Cup qualification

== Post-retirement ==
In 2026, González joined TNT Sports Chile as a football commentator.

On 20 September 2026, González joined the amateur football club Carmelo de Praga from Catemu.

== Personal life ==
His son, Mateo, is a right-back from the Universidad de Chile youth system.

== Career statistics ==
Team	Season	League			Cup^{1}		Continental^{2}		Other^{3}		Total	
Team	Season	Division	Apps	Goals	Apps	Goals	Apps	Goals	Apps	Goals	Apps	Goals
Rangers (loan)	2002	Chilean Primera División	23	1	–		–		–		23	1
Colón	2003–04	Argentine Primera División	9	1	–		–		–		9	1
Colón	2004–05	Argentine Primera División	4	0	–		–		–		4	0
Colón	Total		13	1	–		–		–		13	1
Palestino	2005	Chilean Primera División	37	3	–		–		–		37	3
Columbus Crew	2006	MLS	18	1	1	0	–		–		19	1
Columbus Crew	2007	MLS	27	1	1	0	–		–		28	1
Columbus Crew	Total		45	2	2	0	–		–		47	2
U. Católica	2008	Chilean Primera División	28	4	0	0	11	2	–		39	6
U. Católica	2009	Chilean Primera División	38	2	1	0	–		–		39	2
U. Católica	2010	Chilean Primera División	22	4	1	0	1	0	–		23	4
U. Católica	Total		88	10	2	0	12	2	–		102	12
Universidad de Chile	2011	Chilean Primera División	25	1	3	0	13	0	–		41	1
Flamengo	2012	Série A	26	2	0	0	5 (Note: Appearance(s) in Copa Libertadores.)	0	6 (Note: Appearance(s) in Campeonato Carioca.)	0	37	2
Flamengo	2013	Série A	19	0	8	0	–		9	0	36	0
Flamengo	2014	Série A	0	0	0	0	–		1	0	1	0
Flamengo	Total		45	2	8	0	5	0	16	0	74	2
Unión Española	2014–15	Chilean Primera División	31	2	6	0	0	0	–		37	2
Necaxa	2015–16	Liga MX	34	3	4	0	–		–		37	3
Necaxa	2016–17	Liga MX	34	2	0	0	–		–		34	2
Necaxa	Total		68	5	4	0	–		–		72	5
Palestino	2017	Chilean Primera División	12	1	2	0	–		–		14	1
Career total			387	28	25	0	30	2	16	0	460	30

^{1}Cup competitions include the MLS Cup, Copa Chile, Copa do Brasil and Copa México
^{2}Other tournaments include the Copa Libertadores and Copa Sudamericana.
^{3}Other tournaments include the Campeonato Carioca.

== Honours ==
Universidad de Chile

- Primera División de Chile (4): 1999, 2000, 2011 Apertura, 2011 Clausura
- Copa Chile: 2000
- Copa Sudamericana: 2011

Universidad Católica

- Primera División de Chile: 2010

Flamengo

- Copa do Brasil: 2013

Individual

- Campeonato Nacional Team of the Season (2): 2009, 2011
- Conmebol Team of the Season: 2011
