= Mark Neave =

English cricketer (born 1980)

Personal information
- Full name: Mark Neave
- Born: 11 February 1980 (age 46); Kettering, Nottinghamshire, England
- Batting: Right-handed
- Bowling: Right-arm off break

Domestic team information
- Years: Team
- 2001: Northamptonshire Cricket Board

Career statistics
| Competition | LA |
|---|---|
| Matches | 1 |
| Runs scored | 11 |
| Batting average | 11.00 |
| 100s/50s | –/– |
| Top score | 11 |
| Balls bowled | 24 |
| Wickets | – |
| Bowling average | – |
| 5 wickets in innings | – |
| 10 wickets in match | – |
| Best bowling | – |
| Catches/stumpings | –/– |
- Source: Cricinfo, 20 November 2010

Mark Neave (born 11 February 1980) is an English cricketer. Neave is a right-handed batsman who bowls right-arm off break. He was born at Kettering, Northamptonshire.

Neave represented the Northamptonshire Cricket Board in a single List A match against the Leicestershire Cricket Board in the 1st round of the 2002 Cheltenham & Gloucester Trophy which was played in 2001. In his only List A match he scored 11 runs.
