= Arran Steele =

English cricketer

Personal information
- Full name: Arran Spencer Steele
- Born: 14 January 1975 (age 51); Corby, Northamptonshire, England
- Batting: Right-handed
- Bowling: Leg break
- Relatives: David Steele (father); Mark Steele (brother); John Steele (uncle)

Domestic team information
- Years: Team
- 1999: Northamptonshire Cricket Board

Career statistics
| Competition | LA |
|---|---|
| Matches | 1 |
| Runs scored | 23 |
| Batting average | 23.00 |
| 100s/50s | –/– |
| Top score | 23 |
| Balls bowled | – |
| Wickets | – |
| Bowling average | – |
| 5 wickets in innings | – |
| 10 wickets in match | – |
| Best bowling | – |
| Catches/stumpings | –/– |
- Source: Cricinfo, 21 November 2010

Arran Spencer Steele (born 14 January 1975) is a former English cricketer. Steele was a right-handed batsman who bowled leg break. He was born in Corby, Northamptonshire.

Steele represented the Northamptonshire Cricket Board in a single List A match against Wiltshire in the 1999 NatWest Trophy. In his only List A match, he scored 23 runs.

His father, David, played Test and One Day International cricket for England. He also played first-class cricket for Northamptonshire, the Marylebone Cricket Club, Derbyshire and Leicestershire, as well as List A cricket for Bedfordshire. His uncle, John, played first-class cricket for Leicestershire, Natal and Glamorgan. His brother, Mark, played a single List A match for Staffordshire.
