= Craig Jennings =

English cricketer

Personal information
- Full name: Craig James Robert Jennings
- Born: 13 November 1984 (age 41); Rugeley, Staffordshire, England
- Batting: Right-handed
- Bowling: Right-arm fast-medium

Domestic team information
- Years: Team
- 2002: Northamptonshire Cricket Board
- 2004: Northamptonshire

Career statistics
Competition	FC	LA	T20
Matches	1	3	1
Runs scored	6	6	2
Batting average	6.00	3.00	2.00
100s/50s	0/0	0/0	0/0
Top score	6	3	2
Balls bowled	84	138	12
Wickets	1	2	0
Bowling average	64.00	63.00	–
5 wickets in innings	0	0	–
10 wickets in match	0	0	–
Best bowling	1/64	1/29	–
Catches/stumpings	0/–	0/–	0/–
- Source: Cricinfo, 29 September 2010

Craig James Robert Jennings (born 13 November 1984) is an English cricketer. Jennings is a right-handed batsman who bowls right-arm fast-medium. He was born at Rugeley, Staffordshire.

Jennings played a single List A match for the Northamptonshire Cricket Board against the Leicestershire Cricket Board in the 1st round of the 2002 Cheltenham & Gloucester Trophy which was played in 2001.

Jennings made a single first-class appearance for Northamptonshire against Worcestershire in the 2004 County Championship. In his only first-class match he scored 6 runs and took a single wicket. During the same season he also represented the county in 2 List-A matches against the touring New Zealanders and Gloucestershire in the totesport League. In the 3 List-A matches he played, he scored 6 runs at a batting average of 3.00, with a high score of 3. With the ball he took 2 wickets at a bowling average of 64.00, with best figures of 1/29. Also during the 2004 season he played a single Twenty20 match for the county against Worcestershire in the 2004 Twenty20 Cup.
