= John Mann (English cricketer) =

English cricketer (born 1983)

Personal information
- Full name: John Paul William Mann
- Born: 25 November 1983 (age 42); Northampton, Northamptonshire, England
- Batting: Right-handed
- Bowling: Leg break

Domestic team information
- Years: Team
- 2003–2005 & 2007: Cambridgeshire
- 2000–2001: Northamptonshire Cricket Board

Career statistics
Competition	LA
Matches	3
Runs scored	6
Batting average	3.00
100s/50s	–/–
Top score	5
Balls bowled	–
Wickets	–
Bowling average	–
5 wickets in innings	–
10 wickets in match	–
Best bowling	–
Catches/stumpings	–/–
- Source: Cricinfo, 23 July 2010

John Paul William Mann (born 25 November 1983) is a former English cricketer. Mann was a right-handed batsman who bowled leg break. He was born at Northampton, Northamptonshire.

Mann made his List-A debut for the Northamptonshire Cricket Board in the 2000 NatWest Trophy against Northumberland. His second and final List-A appearance for the team came in the 2001 Cheltenham & Gloucester Trophy against the Yorkshire Cricket Board.

In 2003, Mann joined Cambridgeshire, where he made his Minor Counties Championship debut against Suffolk. From 2003 to 2005, he represented the county in 18 Minor Counties Championship matches, with his final appearance coming against Staffordshire. Mann also played 8 MCCA Knockout Trophy matches for the county from 2003 to 2005. He also represented the county in a single trophy match in 2007 against Hertfordshire, which was his final appearance for the county.

Mann also represented Cambridgeshire in a single List-A match in the 2004 Cheltenham & Gloucester Trophy against Northamptonshire. In his 3 List-A matches, he scored just 6 runs at a batting average of 3.00, with a high score of 5.
