= Rob Large =

English cricketer

Personal information
- Full name: Robert Derek Large
- Born: 23 October 1981 (age 45); Aylesbury, Buckinghamshire, England
- Batting: Right-handed
- Bowling: Right-arm medium

Domestic team information
- Years: Team
- 2001: Northamptonshire Cricket Board

Career statistics
| Competition | List A |
|---|---|
| Matches | 1 |
| Runs scored | 27 |
| Batting average | 27.00 |
| 100s/50s | 0/0 |
| Top score | 27 |
| Catches/stumpings | 0/– |
- Source: Cricinfo, 20 November 2010

Robert 'Rob' Derek Large (born 23 October 1981) is an English cricketer. Large is a right-handed batsman who bowls right-arm medium pace. He was born at Aylesbury, Buckinghamshire.

Large represented the Northamptonshire Cricket Board in a single List A match against the Leicestershire Cricket Board in the 1st round of the 2002 Cheltenham & Gloucester Trophy which was played in 2001. In his only List A match he scored 27 runs.
