= Richard Ashton =

English cricketer

Personal information
- Full name: Richard Lawrence Ashton
- Born: 26 September 1963 (age 63); Northampton, Northamptonshire
- Batting: Right-handed
- Bowling: Right-arm medium

Domestic team information
- Years: Team
- 1988: Lincolnshire
- 1991: Bedfordshire
- 1999–2000: Northamptonshire Cricket Board

Career statistics
Competition	LA
Matches	3
Runs scored	8
Batting average	4.00
100s/50s	0/0
Top score	5*
Balls bowled	100
Wickets	1
Bowling average	98.00
5 wickets in innings	0
10 wickets in match	0
Best bowling	1/30
Catches/stumpings	2/–
- Source: Cricinfo, 21 November 2010

Richard Lawrence Ashton (born 26 September 1963) is an English former cricketer. Ashton is a right-handed batsman who bowls right-arm medium pace. He was born at Northampton, Northamptonshire.

Pack made his debut in County Cricket for Lincolnshire by playing a single Minor Counties Championship match for them against Durham in 1988.

In 1991, he joined Bedfordshire, where during that season he played 3 Minor Counties Championship matches against Northumberland, Cumberland and Suffolk. In his only season with the county, he also played a single List A match against Worcestershire in the 1991 NatWest Trophy.

Eight years later he represented the Northamptonshire Cricket Board, playing 2 List A matches for the Board against Wiltshire in the 1999 NatWest Trophy and Northumberland in the 2000 NatWest Trophy. In his career total of 3 List A matches, he scored 8 runs at a batting average of 4.00, with a high score of 5*. In the field he took 2 catches, while with the ball he took a single wicket at a bowling average of 98.00, with best figures of 1/30.

He currently plays club cricket for Northampton Saints Cricket Club in the Northamptonshire Cricket League.
