= Terry Barratt =

English cricketer (born 1971)

Personal information
- Full name: Terry Barratt
- Born: 23 February 1971 (age 55); Rothwell, Northamptonshire, England
- Batting: Left-handed
- Bowling: Right-arm medium-fast

Domestic team information
- Years: Team
- 2001: Northamptonshire Cricket Board

Career statistics
Competition	LA
Matches	1
Runs scored	–
Batting average	–
100s/50s	–/–
Top score	–
Balls bowled	30
Wickets	–
Bowling average	–
5 wickets in innings	–
10 wickets in match	–
Best bowling	–
Catches/stumpings	–/–
- Source: Cricinfo, 21 November 2010

Terry Barratt (born 23 February 1971) is a former English cricketer. Barratt was a left-handed batsman who bowled right-arm medium-fast. He was born at Rothwell, Northamptonshire.

Barratt represented the Northamptonshire Cricket Board in a single List A match against Northamptonshire in the 2001 Cheltenham & Gloucester Trophy.
