= Jeremy Goode =

English cricketer

Personal information
- Full name: Jeremy Richard Goode
- Born: 2 June 1972 (age 54); Northampton, Northamptonshire, England
- Batting: Left-handed
- Bowling: Leg break

Domestic team information
- Years: Team
- 2001: Wiltshire
- 1999: Northamptonshire Cricket Board
- 1998: Cambridgeshire

Career statistics
Competition	LA
Matches	2
Runs scored	30
Batting average	15.00
100s/50s	–/–
Top score	29
Balls bowled	–
Wickets	–
Bowling average	–
5 wickets in innings	–
10 wickets in match	–
Best bowling	–
Catches/stumpings	–/–
- Source: Cricinfo, 12 October 2010

Jeremy Richard Goode (born 2 June 1972) is a former English cricketer. Goode was a left-handed batsman who bowled leg break. He was born in Northampton, Northamptonshire.

Goode made his debut in County Cricket for Cambridgeshire in the 1998 Minor Counties Championship against Suffolk, in what was his only Minor Counties Championship appearance for the county. He also represented Cambridgeshire in 3 matches in the MCCA Knockout Trophy against Norfolk, the Essex Cricket Board and Suffolk.

In 1999, he made his debut in List A cricket for the Northamptonshire Cricket Board in the 1999 NatWest Trophy against Wiltshire. He also represented the Board in several MCCA Knockout Trophy matches.

Goode later joined Wiltshire in 2001, where he made a single Minor Counties Championship appearance against Devon. During the 2001 season, he also represented Wiltshire in the MCCA Knockout Trophy. He played 4 matches in competition for Wiltshire, which came against the Cornwall, Devon, the Somerset Cricket Board and the Gloucestershire Cricket Board.

Goode also represented Wiltshire in a single List A match against Ireland in the 1st round of the 2002 Cheltenham & Gloucester Trophy which was played in 2001. In his 2 List A matches, he scored 30 runs at a batting average of 15.00, with a high score of 29.
