= Ohio Athletic Conference =

Athletic conference with members in Ohio, USA

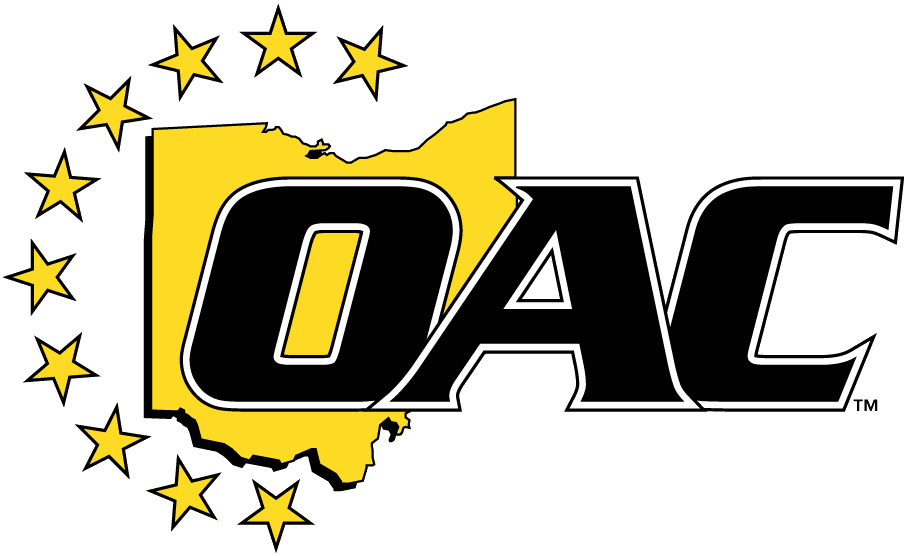
- Association: NCAA
- Founded: 1902; 124 years ago
- Commissioner: Bethany Dannelly (since 2024)
- Sports fielded: 23; men's: 12; women's: 11
- Division: Division III
- No. of teams: 9
- Headquarters: Westerville, Ohio
- Region: Ohio
- Website: oac.org

Locations
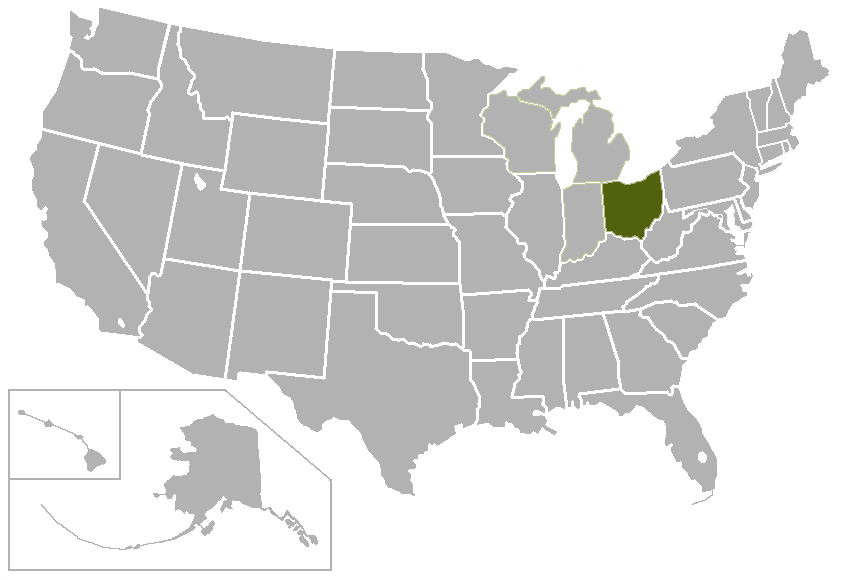

The Ohio Athletic Conference (OAC) is an intercollegiate athletic conference which competes in the NCAA's Division III. All member institutions are located in Ohio. Formed in 1902, it is the third oldest athletic conference in the United States. In its history, 31 schools have been members of the OAC. The enrollments of the current nine member institutions range from around 1,000 to 4,500. Its current commissioner is Bethany Dannelly. Former commissioners include Mike Cleary, who was the first General Manager of a professional basketball team to hire an African American head coach, and would later run the National Association of Collegiate Directors of Athletics (NACDA).

== History ==
Locations of members in the Ohio Athletic Conference

The Ohio Athletic Conference was found in 1902 with six charter members—Case Tech, Kenyon, Oberlin, Ohio State, Ohio Wesleyan, and Western Reserve. By 1934, the conference reached an all-time high of twenty-four members, seeing many schools come and go throughout the upcoming decades. By 2000, the conference solidified to its current form with the addition of its final school, Wilmington, to ten members.

On January 18, 2024, John Carroll University announces departure from the OAC to the North Coast Athletic Conference (NCAC), beginning in the 2025–26 academic year.

=== Conference timeline ===
Historical membership of the OAC: current members in red and former members in steel.
- 1902 – The Ohio Athletic Conference (OAC) was founded. Charter members included Case Institute of Technology, Kenyon College, Oberlin College, Ohio State University, Ohio Wesleyan University and Western Reserve University, beginning the 1902–03 academic year.
- 1907 – Denison University, Heidelberg College (now Heidelberg University) and the College of Wooster joined the OAC in the 1907–08 academic year.
- 1909 – Wittenberg College (now Wittenberg University) joined the OAC in the 1909–10 academic year.
- 1910 – The University of Cincinnati and Ohio University joined the OAC in the 1910–11 academic year.
- 1911 – Miami University joined the OAC in the 1911–12 academic year.
- 1912 – Ohio State left the OAC after the 1911–12 academic year.
- 1914 – Mount Union College (now the University of Mount Union) joined the OAC in the 1914–15 academic year.
- 1915 – The University of Akron and Baldwin Wallace College (now Baldwin Wallace University) joined the OAC in the 1915–16 academic year.
- 1916 – Ohio Northern University joined the OAC in the 1916–17 academic year.
- 1919 – Baldwin Wallace left the OAC after the 1918–19 academic year.
- 1920 – Hiram College joined the OAC in the 1920–21 academic year.
- 1921 – Otterbein College (now Otterbein University) and St. Xavier College (now Xavier University) joined the OAC in the 1921–22 academic year.
- 1922 – Muskingum College (now Muskingum University) joined the OAC in the 1922–23 academic year.
- 1923 – Baldwin Wallace rejoined the OAC for a second time in the 1923–24 academic year.
- 1924 – Cincinnati left the OAC after the 1923–24 academic year.
- 1926 – Marietta College joined the OAC in the 1926–27 academic year.
- 1927 – Capital University joined the OAC in the 1927–28 academic year.
- 1928 – Denison, Miami, Ohio, Ohio Wesleyan and Wittenberg left the OAC to form the Buckeye Conference, alongside Cincinnati (who left 4 years prior), after the 1927–28 academic year.
- 1931 – Ashland College (now Ashland University) joined the OAC in the 1931–32 academic year.
- 1932:
  - Western Reserve left the OAC after the 1931–32 academic year.
  - John Carroll University, Kent State College (now Kent State University) and Toledo University (now the University of Toledo) joined the OAC in the 1932–33 academic year.
- 1933 – Bowling Green State College (now Bowling Green State University) joined the OAC, with Denison rejoining for a second time as well, in the 1933–34 academic year.
- 1934 – Wittenberg rejoined the OAC for a second time in the 1934–35 academic year.
- 1935 – Hiram left the OAC after the 1934–35 academic year.
- 1936:
  - Baldwin Wallace, Case Tech, John Carroll, Toledo and Xavier were suspended from the OAC for a violation of the opening date of football practice, all of them (except Xavier) were re-instated back the following school year.
  - Akron and Xavier left the OAC after the 1935–36 academic year.
- 1942 – Bowling Green State left the OAC after the 1941–42 academic year.
- 1944 – Akron rejoined the OAC for a second time in the 1944–45 academic year, with football rejoining in the 1948 fall season (1948–49 academic year).
- 1947:
  - Ohio Northern left the OAC after the 1946–47 academic year.
  - Ohio Wesleyan rejoined the OAC for a second time in the 1947–48 academic year.
- 1948 – Ashland and Case Tech, alongside Baldiwn Wallace for a second time, left the OAC after the 1947–48 academic year.
- 1949 – John Carroll and Toledo left the OAC after the 1948–49 academic year.
- 1951:
  - Kent State left the OAC after the 1950–51 academic year.
  - Hiram rejoined the OAC for a second time in the 1951–52 academic year.
- 1961 – Baldwin Wallace rejoined the OAC for a third time in the 1961–62 academic year.
- 1966 – Akron left the OAC for a second time after the 1965–66 academic year.
- 1971 – Hiram left the OAC for a second time after the 1970–71 academic year.
- 1973 – Ohio Northern rejoined the OAC for a second time in the 1973–74 academic year.
- 1984 – Kenyon, Oberlin and Wooster left the OAC, alongside Denison and Ohio Wesleyan for a second time, to form the North Coast Athletic Conference (NCAC) after the 1983–84 academic year.
- 1989:
  - Wittenberg left the OAC for a second time after the 1988–89 academic year.
  - Hiram rejoined the OAC for a third time, alongside John Caroll who rejoined for a second time, both effective in the 1989–90 academic year.
- 1999 – Hiram left the OAC for a third time after the 1998–99 academic year.
- 2000 – Wilmington College of Ohio joined the OAC in the 2000–01 academic year.
- 2011 – Defiance College joined the OAC as an associate member for men's and women's swimming and diving in the 2011–12 academic year.
- 2012 – Transylvania University joined the OAC as an associate member for men's and women's swimming and diving in the 2012–13 academic year.
- 2014 – Defiance left the OAC as an affiliate member for men's and women's swimming and diving after the 2013–14 academic year.
- 2015 – Manchester University joined the OAC as an associate member for men's and women's swimming and diving in the 2015–16 academic year.
- 2017 – Manchester and Transylvania left the OAC as affiliate members for men's and women's swimming and diving after the 2016–17 academic year.
- 2025 – John Carroll left the OAC to join the NCAC after the 2024–25 academic year.

== Member schools ==
=== Current members ===
The OAC currently has nine full members, all are private schools:

| Institution | Location (Note: All cities are located within the State of Ohio.) | Founded | Affiliation | Enrollment | Nickname | Joined (Note: Represents the calendar year when fall sports competition begins.) | Colors |
|---|---|---|---|---|---|---|---|
| Baldwin Wallace University | Berea | 1845 | Nonsectarian | 3,220 | Yellow Jackets | 1915; 1923; (Note: Baldwin-Wallace left the OAC after the 1918-19 school year, but returned in the 1923-24 school year.); 1961 (Note: Baldwin-Wallace left the OAC again after the 1947-48 school year, but returned again in the 1961-62 school year.) | |
| Capital University | Bexley | 1830 | Lutheran ELCA | 2,617 | Comets | 1927 | |
| Heidelberg University | Tiffin | 1850 | United Church of Christ | 1,086 | Student Princes | 1907 | |
| Marietta College | Marietta | 1835 | Nonsectarian | 1,198 | Pioneers | 1926 | |
| University of Mount Union | Alliance | 1846 | Nonsectarian | 2,130 | Purple Raiders | 1914 | |
| Muskingum University | New Concord | 1837 | Presbyterian | 2,117 | Fighting Muskies | 1922 | |
| Ohio Northern University | Ada | 1871 | United Methodist | 3,015 | Polar Bears | 1916; 1973 (Note: Ohio Northern left the OAC after the 1948-49 school year, but returned in the 1973-74 school year.) | |
| Otterbein University | Westerville | 1847 | United Methodist | 3,080 | Cardinals | 1921 | |
| Wilmington College | Wilmington | 1870 | Quakers | 1,046 | Quakers | 2000 | |

=== Former members ===
The OAC had 21 former full members, all but seven were private schools:

| Institution | Location (Note: All cities are located within the State of Ohio.) | Founded | Affiliation | Enrollment | Nickname | Joined (Note: Represents the calendar year when fall sports competition begins.) | Left (Note: Represents the calendar year when spring sports competition ends.) | Colors | Current conference |
|---|---|---|---|---|---|---|---|---|---|
| University of Akron (Note: Akron left the OAC after the 1935-36 school year, but returned in the 1944-45 school year before leaving for good after the 1965-66 school year.) | Akron | 1870 | Public | 18,730 | Zips | 1915; 1944 | 1936; 1966 | | Mid-American (MAC) (Note: Currently an NCAA Division I Football Bowl Subdivision athletic conference.) |
| Ashland University | Ashland | 1878 | Brethren | 6,626 | Eagles | 1931 | 1948 | | Great Midwest (G-MAC) (Note: Currently an NCAA Division II athletic conference.) |
| Bowling Green State University | Bowling Green | 1910 | Public | 17,540 | Falcons | 1933 | 1942 | | Mid-American (MAC) |
| Case Institute of Technology (Note: Case Tech and Western Reserve merged with to form Case Western Reserve University in 1967. However, their athletic programs continued to operate separately until after the 1969-70 school year.) | Cleveland | 1880 | Nonsectarian | N/A | various (Note: Case Tech's nicknames were the following: Scientists from 1918-19 to 1939-40; and Rough Riders from 1940-41 to 1970-71.) | 1902 | 1948 | | University (UAA) |
| University of Cincinnati | Cincinnati | 1819 | Public | 45,949 | Bearcats | 1910 | 1924 | | Big 12 |
| University of Dayton | Dayton | 1850 | Catholic (Marianist) | 11,241 | Flyers | 1926 | 1934 | | Atlantic 10 (A-10) (Note: Currently an NCAA Division I non-football athletic conference.) |
| Denison University (Note: Denison left the OAC after the 1927-28 school year, but rejoined in the 1933-34 school year before leaving for good after the 1983-84 school year.) | Granville | 1831 | Nonsectarian | 2,100 | Big Red | 1907; 1933 | 1928; 1984 | | North Coast (NCAC) |
| Hiram College (Note: Hiram first left the OAC after the 1934-35 school year, but rejoined in the 1951-52 school year. It left the OAC again after the 1970-71 school year, but returned again in the 1989-90 school year before leaving for good after the 1998-99 school year.) | Hiram | 1850 | Disciples of Christ | 1,395 | Terriers | 1920; 1951; 1989 | 1935; 1971; 1999 | | Presidents' (PAC) |
| John Carroll University (Note: John Carroll left the OAC after the 1948-49 school year, but rejoined in the 1989-90 school year before leaving for good after the 2024-25 school year.) | University Heights | 1886 (Note: Founded as St. Ignatius College in Cleveland.) | Catholic (Jesuit) | 2,922 | Blue Streaks | 1932; 1989 | 1948; 2025 | | North Coast (NCAC) |
| Kent State University | Kent | 1910 | Public | 28,122 | Golden Flashes | 1932 | 1951 | | Mid-American (MAC) |
| Kenyon College | Gambier | 1824 | Episcopal/Anglican | 1,640 | Lords & Ladies | 1902 | 1984 | | North Coast (NCAC) |
| Miami University | Oxford | 1809 | Public | 19,933 | RedHawks (Note: During Miami's tenure in the OAC, the school had no established nickname; "Boys", "Big Reds", and "Red and White" were used interchangeably. "Redskins" made its first appearance in 1928; by 1931, that nickname became official. Miami (OH) has been competing as the RedHawks since the 1997-98 school year.) | 1911 | 1928 | | Mid-American (MAC) |
| Oberlin College | Oberlin | 1833 | Nonsectarian | 2,850 | Yeomen & Yeowomen | 1902 | 1984 | | North Coast (NCAC) |
| Ohio State University | Columbus | 1870 | Public | 61,369 | Buckeyes | 1902 | 1912 | | Big Ten |
| Ohio University (Note: Ohio adopts conference rules in 1909 that go into effect for the 1910 fall season (1910-11 school year)."Ohio University Football", Cincinnati Enquirer, Cincinnati, OH, p. 4, September 27, 1909) | Athens | 1804 | Public | 28,750 | Bobcats | 1910 | 1925 | | Mid-American (MAC) |
| Ohio Wesleyan University (Note: Ohio Wesleyan left the OAC after the 1927-28 school year, but rejoined in the 1947-48 school year before leaving for good after the 1983-84 school year.) | Delaware | 1842 | United Methodist (Note: Paused affiliation with the United Methodist Church in 2019.) | 1,850 | Battlin' Bishops | 1902; 1947 | 1928; 1984 | | North Coast (NCAC) |
| University of Toledo | Toledo | 1872 | Public | 20,304 | Rockets | 1932 | 1947 | | Mid-American (MAC) |
| Western Reserve University | Cleveland | 1826 | Nonsectarian | N/A | various (Note: Western Reserve's nicknames were the following: Pioneers from 1920-21 to 1927-28; and Red Cats from 1928-29 to 1970-71.) | 1902 | 1932 | | University (UAA) |
| Wittenberg University (Note: Wittenberg left the OAC after the 1927-28 school year, but rejoined in the 1934-35 school year before leaving for good after the 1988-89 school year.) | Springfield | 1845 | Lutheran ELCA | 2,050 | Tigers | 1909; 1934 | 1928; 1989 | | North Coast (NCAC) |
| The College of Wooster | Wooster | 1866 | Nonsectarian | 1,827 | Fighting Scots | 1907 | 1984 | | North Coast (NCAC) |
| Xavier University | Cincinnati | 1831 | Catholic (Jesuit) | 7,112 | Musketeers | 1921 | 1936 | | Big East |

=== Former associate members ===
The OAC had three former associate members, all private schools. This included the only schools outside of Ohio that had any level of OAC membership.

| Institution | Location | Founded | Affiliation | Enrollment | Nickname | Joined (Note: Represents the calendar year when fall sports competition begins.) | Left (Note: Represents the calendar year when spring sports competition ends.) | Colors | OAC sport | Primary conference |
|---|---|---|---|---|---|---|---|---|---|---|
| Defiance College | Defiance, Ohio | 1850 | United Church of Christ | 1,000 | Yellow; Jackets | 2011 | 2014 | | Men's swimming & diving | Wolverine-Hoosier (WHAC) (Note: Currently an NAIA athletic conference.) |
| Defiance College | Defiance, Ohio | 1850 | United Church of Christ | 1,000 | Yellow; Jackets | 2011 | 2014 | | Women's swimming & diving | Wolverine-Hoosier (WHAC) |
| Manchester University | North Manchester, Indiana | 1860 | Church of the Brethren | 1,250 | Spartans | 2015 | 2017 | | Men's swimming & diving | Heartland (HCAC) |
| Manchester University | North Manchester, Indiana | 1860 | Church of the Brethren | 1,250 | Spartans | 2015 | 2017 | | Women's swimming & diving | Heartland (HCAC) |
| Transylvania University | Lexington, Kentucky | 1780 | Disciples of Christ | 1,120 | Pioneers | 2012 | 2017 | | Men's swimming & diving | Heartland (HCAC) |
| Transylvania University | Lexington, Kentucky | 1780 | Disciples of Christ | 1,120 | Pioneers | 2012 | 2017 | | Women's swimming & diving | Heartland (HCAC) |

=== Membership timeline ===
Full member (all sports) Full member (non-football) Associate member (football) Associate member (sport)

== Sports ==
In 2023–24, the OAC sponsors the following championships:

Conference sports
| Sport | Men's | Women's |
|---|---|---|
| Baseball | ✓ | |
| Basketball | ✓ | ✓ |
| Cross country | ✓ | ✓ |
| Football | ✓ | |
| Golf | ✓ | ✓ |
| Lacrosse | ✓ | ✓ |
| Soccer | ✓ | ✓ |
| Softball | | ✓ |
| Swimming & Diving | ✓ | ✓ |
| Tennis | ✓ | ✓ |
| Indoor Track | ✓ | ✓ |
| Outdoor Track | ✓ | ✓ |
| Volleyball | | ✓ |
| Wrestling | ✓ | |

== Facilities ==
| School | Football stadium | Capacity | Basketball arena | Capacity | Baseball field | Capacity | Softball field | Capacity |
|---|---|---|---|---|---|---|---|---|
| Baldwin Wallace | George Finnie Stadium | 10,000 | Rudolph Ursprung Gymnasium | 2,800 | Heritage Field | | Rhoem Athletic Complex | |
| Capital | Bernlohr Stadium | 3,000 | Capital Center | 2,100 | Clowson Field | | Clowson Field | |
| Heidelberg | Hoernemann Stadium | 1,300 | Seiberling Gymnasium | | Peaceful Valley | | Frann's Field | |
| Marietta | Don Drumm Stadium | 5,000 | Ban Johnson Arena | 1,457 | Don Schaly Stadium | 1,500 | Marietta Field | |
| Mount Union | Mount Union Stadium | 5,600 | McPherson Academic and Athletic Complex | 3,000 | 23rd Street Field | | 23rd Street Field | |
| Muskingum | McConagha Stadium | 5,000 | Anne C. Steele Center | 2,500 | Mose Morehead Field | | Donna J. Newberry Field | |
| Ohio Northern | Dial-Roberson All-Events Stadium | 3,500 | ONU Sports Center | | Wander Field | | ONU Softball Field | |
| Otterbein | Memorial Stadium | 2,400 | Rike Center | 3,100 | Fishbaugh Field | | Otterbein Softball Field | |
| Wilmington | Williams Stadium | 3,500 | Fred Raizk Arena | 3,500 | Tewksbury-Delaney Field | | WC Softball Field | |

== OAC tournament championship history ==
=== Men's swimming & diving ===
- 2017–2025: John Carroll
- 2006–2016: Ohio Northern

=== Women's swimming & diving ===
- 2017–2025: John Carroll
- 2015–2016: Mount Union

=== Women's basketball ===
- 2022–2025: Baldwin-Wallace
- 2021: John Carroll
- 2020: Baldwin-Wallace
- 2019: John Carroll
- 2018: Marietta
- 2017: Ohio Northern
- 2016: Mount Union
- 2015: Baldwin-Wallace
- 2014: Capital
- 2013: Ohio Northern
- 2010–2012: Mount Union
- 2009: Capital

=== Men's basketball ===
- 2024–2025: John Carroll
- 2023: Mount Union
- 2020–2021: Marietta
- 2020: Mount Union
- 2019: Baldwin-Wallace
- 2018: John Carroll
- 2017: Marietta
- 2016: John Carroll
- 2015: Mount Union
- 2014: Wilmington
- 2013: Marietta
- 2012: Capital
- 2011: Marietta
- 2010: Wilmington
- 2009: John Carroll
- 2008: Heidelberg
- 2007: Capital
- 2005–2006: Baldwin-Wallace
- 2003–2004: John Carroll
- 2002: Otterbein
- 1999–2001: Ohio Northern
- 1998: Baldwin-Wallace
- 1997: Mount Union
- 1996: Baldwin-Wallace
- 1995: Ohio Northern
- 1991–1994: Otterbein
- 1990: Muskingum
- 1989: Otterbein
- 1988: Muskingum
- 1987: Wittenberg
- 1986: Otterbein
- 1985: Wittenberg
- 1984: Capital
- 1981–1983: Wittenberg
- 1980: Ohio Northern
- 1979: Wittenberg
- 1978: Otterbein
- 1977: Muskingum
- 1976: Oberlin
- 1974–1975: Wittenberg
- 1973: Wooster
- 1972: Wittenberg
- 1971: Capital
- 1970: Oberlin
- 1969: Wittenberg
- 1968: Dennison
- 1967: Baldwin-Wallace
- 1964–1966: Akron
- 1960–1963: Wittenberg

=== Football ===
- 2026: Baldwin Wallace
- 2017–2025: Mount Union
- 2016: John Carroll
- 1995–2015: Mount Union
- 1994: Baldwin Wallace/John Carroll/Mount Union
- 1992–1993: Mount Union
- 1991: Baldwin-Wallace
- 1990: Mount Union
- 1989: John Carroll
- 1988: Baldwin-Wallace/Wittenberg
- 1987: Capital
- 1985–1986: Mount Union
- 1982–1984: Baldwin-Wallace
- 1981: Wittenberg
- 1980: Baldwin-Wallace
- 1979: Wittenberg
- 1977–1978: Baldwin-Wallace
- 1976: Wittenberg
- 1975: Muskingum
- 1973–1974: Wittenberg
- 1972: Heidelberg
- 1971: Ohio Wesleyan
- 1970: Wittenberg (vacated)
- 1969: Wittenberg
- 1968: Baldwin Wallace
- 1967: Ohio Wesleyan
- 1961–1966: Wittenberg
- 1960: Muskingum
- 1959: Heidelberg

=== Men's soccer ===
- 2024: Otterbein
- 2023: Ohio Northern
- 2018–2022: John Carroll
- 2017: Otterbein
- 2016: John Carroll
- 2015: Ohio Northern
- 2014: Heidelberg
- 2010–2013: Ohio Northern
- 2009: Capital/Ohio Northern
- 2008: Ohio Northern
- 2004: Wilmington
- 2000: Wilmington

=== Women's soccer ===
- 2021–2024: Otterbein
- 2020: John Carroll
- 2019: Ohio Northern
- 2018: Otterbein
- 2017: Ohio Northern
- 2016: Mount Union
- 2013–2015: Capital
- 2012: Ohio Northern
- 2011: Capital
- 2010: Otterbein

=== Baseball ===
- 2024–2025: Baldwin-Wallace
- 2023: John Carroll
- 2020–2022: Marietta
- 2019: Otterbein
- 2018: Baldwin-Wallace
- 2017: Otterbein
- 2015–2016: Marietta
- 2014: John Carroll
- 2013: Mount Union
- 2011–2012: Marietta
- 2008–2010: Heidelberg
- 2005–2007: Otterbein
- 2004: Heidelberg
- 2003: Otterbein
- 1990–2002: Marietta
- 1989: Otterbein
- 1986–1988: Marietta
- 1985: Baldwin-Wallace
- 1984: Marietta
- 1982–1983: Ohio Northern
- 1977–1981: Marietta
- 1976: Ohio Northern
- 1975: Marietta
- 1974: Ohio Northern
- 1971–1973: Marietta
- 1970: Marietta/Mount Union
- 1969: Ohio Wesleyan
- 1968: Wittenberg
- 1967: Hiram
- 1966: Wittenberg
- 1965: Ohio Wesleyan
- 1964: Mount Union
- 1963: Wittenberg
- 1962: Hiram
- 1961: Ohio Wesleyan
- 1960: Wittenberg

=== Women's volleyball ===
- 2020–2024: Otterbein
- 2018–2019: Ohio Northern
- 2017: Otterbein
- 2016: Ohio Northern
- 2015: Heidelberg
- 2011–2014: Mount Union
- 2010: Heidelberg
- 2009: Ohio Northern
- 2008: Heidelberg

=== Men's golf ===
- 2025: John Carroll
- 2023–2024: Otterbein
- 2022: John Carroll
- 2021: Otterbein
- 2015–2019: Otterbein
- 2014: Baldwin Wallace
- 2013: Otterbein
- 2012: Mount Union
- 2010–2011: Otterbein
- 2009: Ohio Northern
- 2008: Otterbein
- 2007: Mount Union
- 2006: Baldwin-Wallace
- 1998–2005: Otterbein
- 1997: John Carroll
- 1996: Otterbein
- 1994–1995: John Carroll
- 1992–1993: Otterbein
- 1991: Heidelberg/Hiram
- 1990: John Carroll
- 1988–1989: Wittenberg
- 1987: Muskingum

=== Men's wrestling ===
- 2021–2025: Baldwin-Wallace
- 2020: Mount Union
- 2016–2019: Baldwin Wallace
- 2015: Mount Union
- 2013–2014: Heidelberg
- 2011–2012: Mount Union
- 2006–2010: Heidelberg
- 2002–2005: John Carroll
- 2001: Ohio Northern
- 2000: Muskingum
- 1998–1999: John Carroll
- 1995–1997: Mount Union
- 1991–1994: John Carroll
- 1985–1990: Mount Union
- 1982–1984: Capital
- 1980–1981: Ohio Northern
- 1979: Muskingum
- 1975–1978: Ohio Northern
- 1974: Mount Union
- 1971–1973: Baldwin-Wallace
- 1970: Wittenberg
- 1968–1969: Denison
- 1967: Hiram
- 1965–1966: Baldwin-Wallace
- 1964: Hiram
- 1963: Baldwin-Wallace
- 1959–1962: Hiram

=== Men's cross country ===
- 2025: Otterbein
- 2021–2024: John Carroll
- 2020 No meet
- 2018-2019: Otterbein
- 2015–2017: Ohio Northern
- 2012–2014: Mount Union
- 2011: Ohio Northern
- 2010: Mount Union
- 2009: Heidelberg
- 2007-2008: Ohio Northern
- 2005–2006: Mount Union
- 2003–2004: Otterbein
- 2001–2002: Mount Union
- 1998-2000: Heidelberg
- 1996–1997: Mount Union
- 1994–1995: Otterbein
- 1993: Mount Union
- 1992: Otterbein
- 1990-1991: Mount Union
- 1988-1989: Otterbein
- 1987: Mount Union
- 1986: Otterbein
- 1984-1985: Mount Union
- 1981-1983: Baldwin-Wallace
- 1980: Otterbein
- 1979: Baldwin-Wallace
- 1974-1978: Mount Union
- 1973: Baldwin-Wallace
- 1972: Denison
- 1966-1971: Mount Union
- 1965: Akron
- 1964: Mount Union
- 1962-1963: Akron
- 1961: Muskingum
- 1959-1960: Oberlin
- 1956-1958: Ohio Wesleyan
- 1955: Oberlin
- 1954: No meet
- 1952-1953: Oberlin
- 1951: Wooster
- 1948-50: Oberlin
- 1947: Case
- 1946: Oberlin
- 1943-1945: No meet
- 1942: Bowling Green
- 1939-1941: Oberlin
- 1938: Wooster
- 1934-1937: Oberlin
- 1933: Wooster
- 1929-1932: Oberlin

=== Women's cross country ===
- 2025: Ohio Northern
- 2021-2024: John Carroll
- 2020: No Meet
- 2015–2018: Otterbein
- 2014: Mount Union
- 2010-2012: Ohio Northern
- 2009: Baldwin-Wallace
- 2008: Ohio Northern
- 2007: Baldwin-Wallace
- 2005-2006: Ohio Northern
- 2003–2004: Mount Union
- 1999-2002: Baldwin-Wallace
- 1998: Ohio Northern
- 1992-1997: Baldwin-Wallace
- 1991: John Carroll
- 1990: Mount Union
- 1987-1989: Baldwin-Wallace
- 1986: Baldwin-Wallace and Mount Union
- 1985: Wittenberg

=== Men's lacrosse ===
- 2025: Ohio Northern
- 2024: John Carroll
- 2016–2022: John Carroll
- 2013–2015: Otterbein

=== Women's lacrosse ===
- 2025: Mount Union
- 2022–2024: Capital
- 2021: John Carroll
- 2014–2019: Mount Union
