= Robbie Rogers =

American soccer player (born 1987)

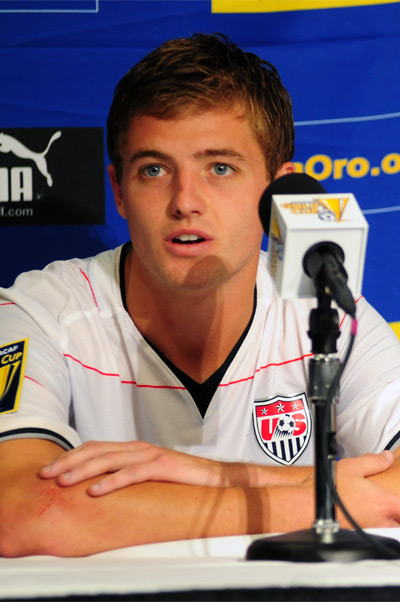
- Rogers in a press conference for the U.S. national team in 2009

Personal information
- Full name: Robert Hampton Rogers III
- Date of birth: May 12, 1987 (age 39)
- Place of birth: Rancho Palos Verdes, California, U.S.
- Height: 5 ft 10 in (1.78 m)
- Positions: Winger; full-back

Youth career
- 2002: IMG Soccer Academy

College career
Years	Team	Apps	(Gls)
2005	Maryland Terrapins	22	(7)

Senior career*
Years	Team	Apps	(Gls)
2005	Orange County Blue Star	3	(0)
2006–2007	Heerenveen	0	(0)
2007–2011	Columbus Crew	106	(13)
2012–2013	Leeds United	4	(0)
2012–2013	→ Stevenage (loan)	6	(0)
2013–2017	LA Galaxy	78	(2)
2014–2016	→ LA Galaxy II (loan)	6	(0)
Total		203	(15)

International career
2004–2007	United States U20	15	(3)
2008	United States U23	5	(1)
2009–2011	United States	18	(2)
- * Club domestic league appearances and goals

Robert Hampton Rogers III (born May 12, 1987) is an American former professional soccer player. He played as a winger and as a full-back. Rogers also represented the United States national team.

In February 2013, Rogers came out as gay, becoming the second male soccer player in Britain to do so after Justin Fashanu in 1990. After a brief retirement, he became the first openly gay man to compete in a top North American professional sports league when he played his first match for the LA Galaxy in May 2013.

After one season of playing college soccer at the University of Maryland, Rogers attracted the interest of the Dutch Eredivisie side Heerenveen. He signed for Heerenveen in August 2006 but failed to make any first-team appearances. He left the club by mutual consent in February 2007, and returned to the United States to sign for Columbus Crew. Rogers' four-year tenure at Columbus Crew was a successful one, with the player breaking through into the first-team, as well as securing an MLS Cup title in 2008 and two Supporters' Shield wins in 2008 and 2009 respectively. In December 2011, Rogers opted to leave Crew when his contract expired. He moved to England, although a series of injuries limited his appearances before he announced his retirement, and returned to the US.

In 2023, Rogers became an executive producer for the Peabody Award-winning miniseries Fellow Travelers.

== Early life and education ==
Robbie Rogers was born in Rancho Palos Verdes, California, the son of Theresa and Robert Hampton Rogers II. He has one brother, Timothy, and three sisters, Nicole Camilla, Alicia, and Katie Rose. His mother's family is originally from the Columbus, Ohio area, where Rogers played for Columbus Crew. His maternal grandfather is a graduate of Ohio State University and his mother spent her early childhood years in Dublin, Ohio, before the family moved to California.

When growing up, Rogers enjoyed surfing, and he still surfs. He also enjoys playing table tennis and has a strong interest in music. Rogers said that his favorite athlete is Zlatan Ibrahimović.

Rogers was accepted to study at the London College of Fashion and is a co-owner of Halsey, a menswear fashion company. He designs, and models for the company; and blogs about men's fashion at Rogers & Becker with friend and stylist Warren Becker.

== Club career ==
=== Early career ===
Rogers started playing soccer at age four-and-a-half at the American Youth Soccer Organization. At the age of seven, Rogers played soccer in the Coast Soccer League, as well as in various Hispanic leagues. He attended Mater Dei High School in Santa Ana, California, where he was a two-time High School All-American in soccer. Rogers made three appearances for Orange County Blue Star of the USL Premier Development League in 2005, leaving upon deciding to attend university in the fall. He played one season of college soccer at the University of Maryland, alongside his future Columbus Crew teammate Jason Garey, helping lead the team to the 2005 NCAA Championship. During his one season at UMD, he scored seven times and assisted a further five goals. He was also named in the ACC All-Conference Freshman team, as well as the Soccer Rookie Team of the Year.

After impressing during his one year of college soccer for Maryland Terrapins, Rogers attracted the interest of Dutch Eredivisie side Heerenveen. In the summer of 2006, Heerenveen invited Rogers to the club for a three-week trial, an option that he ultimately took up. The trial period was successful, and he signed a two-year professional contract with the Dutch side in August 2006, his first professional deal. Rogers admitted that the decision to turn professional, and turn down three remaining years of eligibility at Maryland, was "the toughest of his life", but also stated that it was "an opportunity he could not pass up". However, Rogers failed to make a first-team appearance for the club, although played frequently for the reserve side that went on to win their respective league during the 2006–07 season. He left Heerenveen by mutual consent in February 2007.

=== Columbus Crew ===
Following his release, Rogers returned to the United States, and was subsequently signed by MLS side Columbus Crew ahead of the 2007 MLS season. Columbus Crew acquired Rogers after they had won a Draft Lottery for the player in March 2007. He scored his first goal for the club on June 17, 2007, netting the opening goal of the game in a 3–3 draw away to New England Revolution. Rogers scored two further times during the 2007 campaign, both of which came in a 3–2 victory over D.C. United at RFK Stadium. He made ten appearances during his first season with Crew, scoring three times and making one assist.

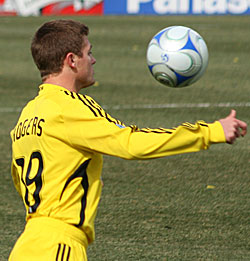
Robbie Rogers on March 29, 2008, at Columbus Crew Stadium, in a match against Toronto FC

The 2008 season would be Rogers' breakthrough season as a professional. He started the campaign playing regularly for Crew, scoring his first goals of the season in a 4–3 home win over CD Chivas USA on April 13, 2008. He went on to score the winning goal in a 2–1 win against Kansas City Wizards on May 4, 2008, before netting twice a week later as Crew defeated San Jose Earthquakes 3–2 to take their winning streak to five matches. Following his two goals against Earthquakes, Rogers was awarded the MLS Player of the Week award for week seven. Rogers' sixth goal of the campaign came in a 3–1 home win against New York Red Bulls at Columbus Crew Stadium in September 2008. He went on to score a further goal in the 2008 MLS Cup Playoffs, scoring the club's second in a 2–0 win over Kansas City Wizards; a win that ensured Crew progressed to the Conference final. Rogers played in all four of Crew's MLS Cup Playoff games, including in the final, where they defeated New York Red Bulls 3–1 at The Home Depot Center in November 2008. The season was successful both individually and collectively for Rogers, as he was named in the MLS Best XI team for the year, as well as picking up Supporters' Shield and MLS Cup silverware. He made 33 appearances during the 2008 campaign, scoring seven times, and assisting three goals.

It took Rogers five months to score his first goal of the 2009 season as Crew started the season without a win in seven games; Rogers eventually netted in a 3–0 win over San Jose Earthquakes at Buck Shaw Stadium on August 9, 2009. It was his only goal of the 2009 MLS season, although he did score two goals in two CONCACAF Champions League matches against Puerto Rico Islanders and Deportivo Saprissa respectively. During the season, Rogers picked up his second Supporters' Shield title after Crew finished first in the overall standings despite their slow start, finishing a point ahead of second placed Los Angeles Galaxy. The club, however, failed to retain their MLS Cup crown following a Conference semi-final defeat to Real Salt Lake, losing 4–2 on aggregate, with Rogers playing in both games. He made 31 appearances in all competitions, and scored three goals.

During the following season, Rogers' fourth at Columbus Crew, he made 34 appearances and scored twice. His first goal of the campaign came in a 3–2 win over New England Revolution in May 2010, with Rogers' goal coming in the 91st minute of the match. He also netted in a 2–1 win over Colorado Rapids in the MLS Cup Conference semi-final. Despite Rogers' goal, eventual champions Rapids would go on to win the tie 5–4 on penalties after extra-time. Rogers opened his account for the 2011 season in the club's first game of the season, scoring a late consolation penalty as Crew went down 3–1 to D.C. United. A month later, in April 2011, he scored the only goal of the game in a 1–0 home victory over Sporting Kansas City at Columbus Crew Stadium. It was to be his last goal for the club, in a season where he played 30 times. His last game for the club was in a 1–0 defeat to Colorado Rapids in the MLS Cup wildcard game on October 28, 2011. During his last season with the club, he led the team in assists and was also awarded the 'Crew Hardest Working Player' award. In December 2011, it was announced that Rogers was a free agent after he rejected the offer of a contract extension at Columbus Crew. During his five seasons at Crew, he made 138 appearances and scored 17 times.

=== Leeds United ===
After Rogers left Columbus Crew, he joined Leeds United on an initial two-week trial period in December 2011, before signing on a permanent basis a month later, in January 2012. Rogers explained his national team coach Jürgen Klinsmann recommended him to then Leeds manager Simon Grayson, who in-turn invited Rogers for a trial at Elland Road. His work permit was granted a week after signing for the club. He made his debut on February 18, 2012, coming as a 79th-minute substitute in an eventual 3–2 home win over Doncaster Rovers. However, he had to be substituted just ten minutes into his debut after suffering a severe clash of heads with Doncaster defender Tommy Spurr. The head injury ultimately ruled Rogers out of first-team action for several weeks. Rogers returned to the first-team in April 2012, making his first appearance under new manager Neil Warnock—with the player coming on as an 85th-minute substitute in a 2–0 defeat to promotion chasing Reading at the Madejski Stadium. He was handed the captain's armband during the match after replacing Robert Snodgrass. A week later, on April 14, Rogers made his first start for the club in a home fixture against Peterborough United. Similarly to his debut, he was substituted after just ten minutes due to sustaining an ankle injury. The ankle injury would ultimately rule him out for the remainder of the season. Rogers made four appearances during the second half of the 2011–12 season, with his first few months at the club blighted by injury.

Ahead of the 2012–13 season, manager Neil Warnock stated that he was hopeful Rogers would be able to get a full pre-season under his belt. In June 2012, Rogers returned to the United States to take part in a rehabilitation program, as well as spending two weeks training with the Los Angeles Galaxy squad. He returned to Leeds at the beginning of July 2012, and featured in a number of the club's pre-season friendlies; scoring in comprehensive victories over Farsley and Tavistock respectively. Shortly before the start of the new season, on August 9, manager Neil Warnock revealed that Rogers, along with teammate Danny Pugh, had been placed on the transfer list in order to generate funds for a new striker.

Rogers joined League One side Stevenage on August 23, on a loan deal until January 2013. Stevenage manager Gary Smith, previously manager of MLS side Colorado Rapids, stated that Rogers always impressed him during his time managing in the United States. He made his debut for Stevenage two days after signing, on August 25, coming on as a late substitute in the club's 1–0 away victory against Oldham Athletic. Rogers made nine appearances in all competitions during his five-month loan spell, with his time at the club "hampered by injury". He returned to his parent club on January 15, 2013.

On his return to Leeds, it was announced that Rogers had left the club by mutual consent and was available on a free transfer. He made just four appearances during his time at the club, of which three were as a substitute.

=== Retirement ===
Weeks after being released by Leeds United, on February 15, 2013, Rogers announced his retirement from professional soccer at age 25 and announced he was gay, making him the first professional soccer player based in Britain to come out since Justin Fashanu did so in 1990. He announced his retirement and sexuality with a 408-word post on his personal blog, robbiehrogers.com, in which Rogers wrote, "I'm a soccer player, I'm Christian, and I'm gay. Those are things that people might say wouldn't go well together. But my family raised me to be an individual and to stand up for what I believe in."

In a March 2013 interview with The Guardian, Rogers said he retired to avoid the pressure and scrutiny from the press and fans, which he called "the circus". Rogers said, "Are people coming to see you because you're gay? Would I want to do interviews every day, where people are asking: 'So you're taking showers with guys—how's that?'"

After basketball player Jason Collins came out as gay in April 2013, he sought out Rogers for advice on dealing with the media.

=== Return and Los Angeles Galaxy ===
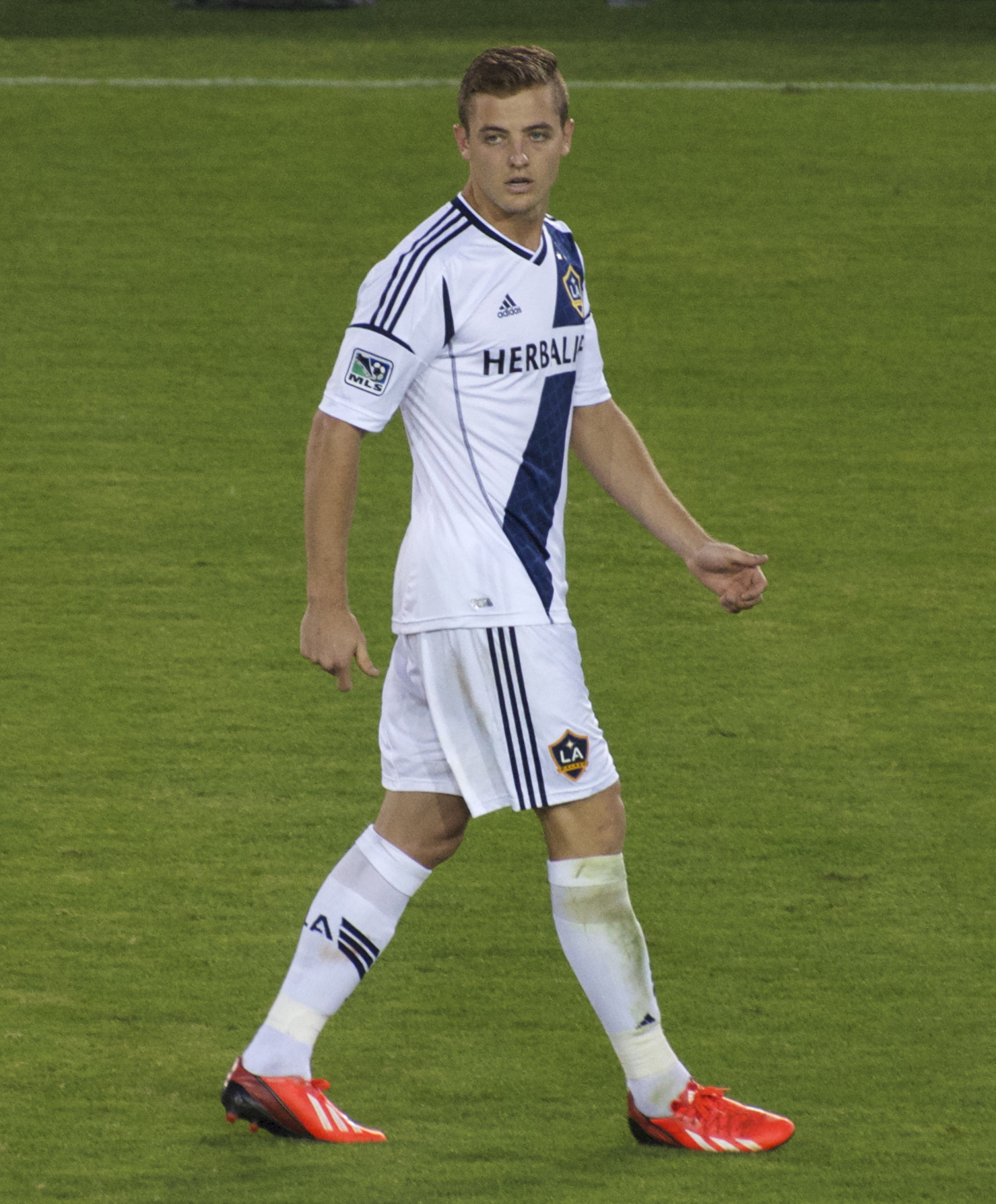
Rogers playing for the LA Galaxy in 2013

On May 1, 2013, Rogers joined Los Angeles Galaxy of Major League Soccer in training as a "special guest". Rogers said he made the decision to return in April 2013, after speaking in front of a crowd of 500 at an LGBTQ youth event in Portland, Oregon, during which he "seriously felt like a coward". Rogers told USA TODAY Sports, "These kids are standing up for themselves and changing the world, and I'm 25, I have a platform and a voice to be a role model. How much of a coward was I to not step up to the plate?" He contacted Galaxy coach Bruce Arena, who extended him an invitation to train in Los Angeles.

On May 24, 2013, Rogers agreed to terms with the Galaxy, pending the trade of his MLS rights from Chicago Fire SC in exchange for Mike Magee. Although the Fire held his MLS rights, Rogers had said in a radio interview that he had no intention of playing for Chicago, as he preferred to be close to his family in Southern California.

On May 26, 2013, Rogers played his first match as a substitute for the Galaxy in a 4–0 win over the Seattle Sounders FC, becoming the first openly gay man to play in a top North American professional sports league (Collins, who had come out earlier in the month, was a free agent at the time of his announcement).

In 2014, Rogers became the first openly gay male athlete to win a major professional team sports title in the United States when the Galaxy were crowned MLS Cup champions.

On June 24, 2015, Rogers scored his first goal for the Galaxy in a 5–0 victory over the Portland Timbers. The goal had special meaning to Rogers as it took place on the Galaxy's 2nd Annual LGBT Pride Night.

On November 7, 2017, Rogers retired permanently due to a series of injuries that forced him to miss the entire 2017 season.

== International career ==
Rogers made eight appearances for the United States U18 team, scoring three goals and assisting a further two, though all were in unofficial friendly matches. He then went on to play regularly for the United States U20 side from 2004 to 2007. He was part of the side that played in the 2006 Milk Cup, as well as representing his country at the 2007 FIFA U20 World Cup—playing in all five of his country's games throughout the tournament. He made 15 appearances for the U20 side, scoring three goals.

He was called up to take part in the United States U23 team's two-game tour of China in 2007; in preparation for the 2008 Summer Olympics, held in Beijing. During the tour, he scored one goal and assisted another in a 3–3 draw with China U23. He was subsequently called up by coach Piotr Nowak to be part of the 18-man U23 Olympic squad, and played in all three games for the U.S. as they departed the tournament in the preliminary round.

=== Senior team ===
In October 2008, then head coach Bob Bradley called Rogers up for the 2010 FIFA World Cup qualifier against Trinidad and Tobago. However, he had to withdraw from the squad due to a back injury, and was consequently replaced by Chris Rolfe. Rogers was then included in a 25-man January camp ahead of a friendly against Sweden on January 24, 2009. He started the match, his first cap for his country at senior level, playing 69 minutes in a 3–2 win at The Home Depot Center. He was named in the United States 2009 CONCACAF Gold Cup squad. He started in his country's first match of the tournament, assisting the first two goals before scoring the third in an eventual 4–0 win against Grenada on July 5, 2009. Rogers made five appearances throughout the tournament, including a starting appearance in the final, which the U.S. lost to Mexico.

After impressing during the Gold Cup, Rogers was called up to play in the United States' final two 2010 FIFA World Cup qualification matches in October 2009. Although he was not named in the squad for the 3–2 win over Honduras on October 11, 2009, he did appear as a second-half substitute in a 2–2 draw with Costa Rica four days later. Rogers came on when the U.S. was losing 2–0, and provided assists for both Michael Bradley and Jonathan Bornstein to tie the game at 2–2. Rogers made two further appearances in friendly matches against Slovakia and Denmark in November 2009, taking his senior team appearance tally to nine.

Rogers began 2010 by featuring in two friendlies against CONCACAF rivals Honduras and El Salvador, as the U.S. began preparing for the 2010 FIFA World Cup. In May 2010, Bradley selected Rogers for the 30-man preliminary roster for the World Cup, and he played in a warm-up friendly against Czech Republic on May 25, 2010, appearing as a second-half substitute. A day later, he was one of seven players that were cut from the final squad. He made one further appearance in 2010, starting in a 1–0 win over South Africa in a friendly played in Cape Town on November 17, 2010.

Rogers was included in the 2011 CONCACAF Gold Cup squad, and started in a warm-up friendly against World champions Spain four days before the start of the tournament, his 14th cap. However, he made no appearances during the tournament as the U.S. lost out to Mexico in the final for the second consecutive time. In August 2011, he scored in a 1–1 draw against Mexico in a friendly played at the Lincoln Financial Field, in Jürgen Klinsmann's first match as U.S. head coach. Rogers' goal came with his first touch having just come on as a substitute, prodding in Brek Shea's low cross to restore parity. He went on to make three further appearances for the U.S. in 2011, all of which in friendly matches. As of December 2014, Rogers has made 18 appearances for his country, scoring two goals.

== Style of play ==
ESPN.com writer Jeff Carlisle has noted Rogers's wing play as an asset, particularly "his ability to attack defenders one-on-one", as well as his crossing ability.

== Other ventures ==
In January 2018, it was announced that Rogers was attached as a producer on husband Greg Berlanti's football drama television pilot. The pilot was ordered to series on May 11, 2018. The series, titled All American, debuted in the fall of 2018. He is also executive producer in Showtime miniseries Fellow Travelers. In 2025, he executive produced The Last Guest of the Holloway Motel, a documentary about English soccer player Tony Powell's experiences as a closeted gay man during his playing career.

He makes a cameo appearance in his husband's film Love, Simon, credited as 'The Coach'.

== Personal life ==
In February 2013, Rogers came out as gay. In October 2014, the American Broadcasting Company closed a deal to air Men in Shorts, a single-camera comedy based on Rogers' career and coming out. Storyline Entertainment and Universal Television optioned the rights to his story in July 2014, and he is credited as a producer.

Rogers began dating television writer producer Greg Berlanti in 2013, and on February 18, 2016, they welcomed their first child, a son, via surrogacy. On December 31, 2016, Rogers and Berlanti announced they had become engaged. They were married on December 2, 2017, in Malibu, California. On May 13, 2019, Rogers and Berlanti had a second child, a daughter.

Rogers is a devout Roman Catholic. He stated that "Being Catholic—and people may disagree—but we are called to love everyone. Be honest. Be true in your relationship with God. I’ve always lived that way."

== Career statistics ==
=== Club ===
Appearances and goals by club, season and competition
Club	Season	League			National Cup		League Cup		Continental		Other		Total	
Club	Season	Division	Apps	Goals	Apps	Goals	Apps	Goals	Apps	Goals	Apps	Goals	Apps	Goals
Columbus Crew	2007	MLS	10	3	1	0	0	0	0	0	0	0	11	3
Columbus Crew	2008	MLS	27	6	2	0	4	1	0	0	0	0	33	7
Columbus Crew	2009	MLS	22	1	0	0	2	0	7	2	0	0	31	3
Columbus Crew	2010	MLS	20	1	2	0	2	1	2	1	8	0	34	3
Columbus Crew	2011	MLS	27	2	1	0	1	0	2	0	0	0	31	2
Columbus Crew	Total		106	13	6	0	9	2	11	3	8	0	140	18
Leeds United	2011–12	Championship	4	0	0	0	0	0	0	0	0	0	4	0
Stevenage (loan)	2012–13	League One	6	0	1	0	1	0	0	0	1	0	9	0
LA Galaxy	2013	MLS	11	0	1	0	2	0	2	0	0	0	16	0
LA Galaxy	2014	MLS	19	0	2	0	5	0	0	0	0	0	26	0
LA Galaxy	2015	MLS	27	1	0	0	1	0	2	0	0	0	30	1
LA Galaxy	2016	MLS	21	1	0	0	3	0	0	0	0	0	24	1
LA Galaxy	Total		78	2	3	0	11	0	4	0	0	0	96	2
LA Galaxy II	2013	USL Pro	1	0	0	0	0	0	0	0	0	0	0	0
LA Galaxy II	2014	USL Pro	4	0	0	0	0	0	0	0	0	0	0	0
LA Galaxy II	2015	USL Pro	1	0	0	0	0	0	0	0	0	0	0	0
LA Galaxy II	2016	USL Pro	1	0	0	0	0	0	0	0	0	0	0	0
LA Galaxy II	Total		7	0	0	0	0	0	0	0	0	0	7	0
Career total			184	15	9	0	20	2	15	3	9	0	236	20

"Other" constitutes appearances and goals in the SuperLiga and Football League Trophy.

=== International ===
Appearances and goals by national team and year
National team	Year	Apps	Goals
United States	2009	9	1
United States	2010	4	0
United States	2011	5	1
Total		18	2

No.	Date	Venue	Opponent	Score	Result	Competition
1.	4 July 2009	Lumen Field, Seattle, United States	Grenada	3–0	4–0	2009 CONCACAF Gold Cup
2.	10 August 2011	Lincoln Financial Field, Philadelphia, United States	Mexico	1–1	1–1	Friendly

== Honors ==
Individual

- MLS Best XI: 2008
- MLS Player of the Week: Week 7, 2008
- 2015 National Gay and Lesbian Sports Hall of Fame inductee

== See also ==
- Homosexuality in sports in the United States
