= Dale Iniff =

English cricketer (born 1977)

Personal information
- Full name: Dale Lee Iniff
- Born: 18 September 1977 (age 49); Penrith, Cumbria, England
- Batting: Right-handed
- Bowling: Left-arm medium

Domestic team information
- Years: Team
- 1999: Northamptonshire Cricket Board

Career statistics
Competition	LA
Matches	1
Runs scored	–
Batting average	–
100s/50s	–/–
Top score	–
Balls bowled	48
Wickets	1
Bowling average	37.00
5 wickets in innings	–
10 wickets in match	–
Best bowling	1/37
Catches/stumpings	1/–
- Source: Cricinfo, 21 November 2010

Dale Lee Iniff (born 18 September 1977) is a former English cricketer. Iniff was a left-handed batsman who bowled right-arm medium pace. He was born at Penrith, Cumbria.

Iniff represented the Northamptonshire Cricket Board in a single List A match against Wiltshire in the 1999 NatWest Trophy. In his only List A match, he took a single wicket at a cost of 37 runs.
