= Thomas Dann =

English cricketer (1981–2021)

Personal information
- Full name: Thomas Oliver Dann
- Born: 30 January 1981; Cambridge, Cambridgeshire, England
- Died: 19 February 2021 (aged 40)
- Batting: Right-handed
- Role: Wicketkeeper

Domestic team information
- Years: Team
- 2000–2001: Northamptonshire Cricket Board

Career statistics
Competition	LA
Matches	4
Runs scored	52
Batting average	26.00
100s/50s	–/–
Top score	27
Balls bowled	–
Wickets	–
Bowling average	–
5 wickets in innings	–
10 wickets in match	–
Best bowling	–
Catches/stumpings	2/–
- Source: Cricinfo, 21 November 2010

Thomas Oliver Dann (30 January 1981 – 19 February 2021) was an English cricketer. Tommy Dann was a right-handed batsman who played primarily as a wicketkeeper. He was born at Cambridge, Cambridgeshire and was later educated at Millfield School.

Dann represented the Northamptonshire Cricket Board in List A cricket. His debut List A match came against Northumberland in the 2000 NatWest Trophy. From 2000 to 2001, he represented the Board in 4 List A matches, the last of which came against the Leicestershire Cricket Board in the 1st round of the 2002 Cheltenham & Gloucester Trophy which was played in 2001. In his 4 List A matches, he scored 52 runs at a batting average of 26.00, with a high score of 27. Behind the stumps he took 2 catches.
