= Andrei Pacheco =

Trinidad and Tobago footballer

Personal information
- Date of birth: September 20, 1984 (age 42)
- Place of birth: Princes Town, Trinidad and Tobago
- Height: 1.85 m (6 ft 1 in)
- Position: Left midfielder

Senior career*
Years	Team	Apps	(Gls)
2006	W Connection		
2006–2007	→ Columbus Crew (loan)	0	(0)
2011–2012	T&TEC Sports Club		
2012–2013	W Connection		
2013–2016	Point Fortin		
2016–	Marabella Family Crisis Centre		

International career^{‡}
2007–2011	Trinidad and Tobago	9	(0)
- * Club domestic league appearances and goals as of 12 March 2016 ‡ National team caps and goals as of 12 March 2016

Andrei Pacheco (born 20 September 1984 in Princes Town) is a Trinidad and Tobago football (soccer) player, who played for W Connection and currently plays for Marabella Family Crisis Centre.

== Career ==
Pacheco signed with the Columbus Crew of Major League Soccer, but never appeared in a league match.
