= Shaun Fourie =

South African cricketer (born 1973)

Personal information
- Born: 28 August 1973 (age 53); East London, South Africa
- Source: Cricinfo, 6 December 2020

Shaun Fourie (born 28 August 1973) is a South African cricketer. He played in eleven first-class matches for Border from 1993/94 to 1996/97.

== See also ==
- List of Border representative cricketers
