= John Wolstenholme =

English cricketer (born 1982)

John Paul Wolstenholme (born 7 May 1982) is a former English cricketer. He is a right-handed batsman and a right-arm medium-fast bowler who played for Northamptonshire.

Wolstenholme's debut in the Second XI came in May 2004, against Warwickshire, having made a List A appearance for Northamptonshire Cricket Board four years previously. He batted defensively and failed to score a run in the first innings, though he finished not out with a respectable score in the second.

Wolstenholme had to wait for just over a year before his first and only first-class appearance, against a team of touring Bangladeshis. Though Wolstenholme did not bat during the match, he bowled with a strong defensive streak, conceding just fourteen runs from nine overs. Wolstenholme was a tailend batsman for both the Second XI and first-class teams.
