= Bernlohr Stadium =

Coordinates: 39.95583°N 82.93462°W

Bernlohr Stadium is the home stadium to the Capital University Comets. The stadium is located on Capital University's campus in Bexley, Ohio. Capital University is a member of the Ohio Athletic Conference. Bernlohr Stadium is mainly used for football, men's and women's soccer, and men's and women's lacrosse.

== The Stadium ==
The stadium consists of one grandstand, which is connect to the Capital Center (The athletic building that is home of a four court field house, athletic offices, and a weight room). There is a three lane track surrounding the field that is used for recreational uses. Has a 16x12 foot LCD scoreboard in the southeast corner that is used for graphics during the games.

== Upgrades ==
In 2011, Bernlohr Stadium was upgraded from an artificial turf surface to a more player friendly FieldTurf. In 2012, the University updated the old score board to the 16x12 foot LCD screen, which sits on top of a ten-foot brick arch, donated to the university by Alumni. In 2015, the University added stadium lights to allow teams to play and practice at night.

=== Stadium lights ===
In the spring of 2013, Capital University brought the plan to add lights for Bernlohr Stadium to the city council of Bexley. After several revisions of the plan to add the lights, Capital University submitted the final request, asking for LED lights, a less bright light, and an upgraded stereo system. In the spring of 2015, the plan to add the lights was accepted by council and the residents of the south side of Bexley. There is a strict guideline that the University must follow to meet the agreement reached in the council meetings that states the lights must be off by 9:30 at night, and lists a certain number of practices or games that lights are allowed to be used. Many of the residents were concerned about the higher rate of traffic, and more population at the university at night.
