= Andrew Daniels =

English cricketer

Personal information
- Full name: Andrew David Daniels
- Born: 11 March 1983 (age 43); Kettering, Northamptonshire, England
- Batting: Right-handed
- Bowling: Leg break
- Role: Wicketkeeper

Domestic team information
- Years: Team
- 2002: Northamptonshire Cricket Board

Career statistics
Competition	LA
Matches	1
Runs scored	2
Batting average	2.00
100s/50s	–/–
Top score	2
Balls bowled	–
Wickets	–
Bowling average	–
5 wickets in innings	–
10 wickets in match	–
Best bowling	–
Catches/stumpings	–/–
- Source: Cricinfo, 20 November 2010

Andrew David Daniels (born 11 March 1983) is an English cricketer. Daniels is a right-handed batsman who bowls leg break and who can field as a wicketkeeper. He was born at Kettering, Northamptonshire.

Daniels represented the Northamptonshire Cricket Board in a single List A match against the Yorkshire Cricket Board in the 1st round of the 2003 Cheltenham & Gloucester Trophy which was played in 2002. In his only List A match he scored 2 runs.
