= Vadim Kirillov =

Soviet footballer and coach

Vadim Kirillov (born 9 September 1964) is a former Soviet football player and coach.

== Career ==
Kirillov played professional football for FC Spartak Moscow and FC Lokomotiv Moscow in the Soviet Union. He made seven appearances as goalkeeper for Lokomotiv Moscow in the Soviet First League during the 1983 season.

He was the goalkeeping coach for Columbus Crew of Major League Soccer from 2007 to 2011. He joined the New York Red Bulls Academy in February 2013. In March 2015 he joined New York Red Bulls II as Goalkeeper coach.
