= Northamptonshire Cricket Board =

Governing body for all recreational cricket in Northamptonshire, England

The Northamptonshire Cricket Board is the governing body for all recreational cricket in the historic county of Northamptonshire.

From 1999 to 2002 the Board fielded a team in the English domestic one-day tournament, matches which had List-A status. The Board's final List A match was in the first round of the 2003 Cheltenham and Gloucester Trophy which was held in August 2002.

== See also ==
List of Northamptonshire Cricket Board List A players
