= 2008 Columbus Crew season =

Columbus Crew
2008 season
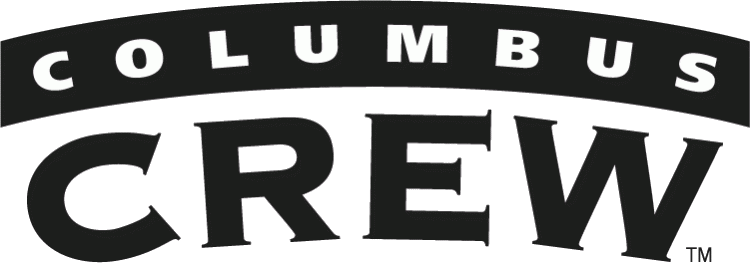
- Investor-operators: Clark Hunt; Dan Hunt; Lamar Hunt Jr. Sharron Hunt Munson; Ron Pizzuti and a group of local investors
- Head Coach: Sigi Schmid
- Stadium: Columbus Crew Stadium
- Major League Soccer: Conference: 1st Overall: 1st
- MLS Cup playoffs: Eastern Conference Champions; MLS Cup Champions
- U.S. Open Cup: Qualification finals
- Top goalscorer: League: Alejandro Moreno (9); All: Alejandro Moreno (10)
- Highest home attendance: 22,685 (10/4 v. LA)
- Lowest home attendance: 4,816(5/24 v. RSL)
- Average home league attendance: 14,422 (63.9%)
- Biggest win: CLB 4–0 NE (9/6)
- Biggest defeat: NY 2-0 CLB (4/5); CHV 2-0 CLB (5/31); CLB 0-2 SJ (6/7); RSL 2-0 CLB (7/12); HOU 2-0 CLB (8/2); NY 3-1 CLB (10/18)
Home colors	Away colors

The 2008 Columbus Crew season was the club's 13th season of existence and their 13th consecutive season in Major League Soccer, the top flight of soccer in the United States and Canada. The first match of the season was on March 29 against Toronto FC. It was the third season under head coach Sigi Schmid. Columbus also competed in the U.S. Open Cup and the MLS Cup Playoffs.

== Background ==
The Crew's rebuilding under Sigi Schmid paid immense dividends in 2008, as the team won the Supporters' Shield and their first MLS Cup championship. Argentine midfielder Guillermo Barros Schelotto won the league MVP award, capping an incredible season with his three-assist performance in the championship game.

== Roster ==
As of match played November 23, 2008

Note: Flags indicate national team as defined under FIFA eligibility rules; some limited exceptions apply. Players may hold more than one non-FIFA nationality.

No.	Pos.	Nation	Player
1	GK	USA	William Hesmer
2	DF	USA	Frankie Hejduk (captain)
3	DF	USA	Brad Evans
4	DF	ARG	Gino Padula (INT)
5	DF	USA	Danny O'Rourke
6	DF	ENG	Andy Iro (INT)
7	FW	ARG	Guillermo Barros Schelotto (INT)
8	DF	NZL	Duncan Oughton
9	FW	USA	Jason Garey
10	FW	VEN	Alejandro Moreno
11	FW	USA	Pat Noonan
12	MF	USA	Eddie Gaven
13	DF	USA	Andrew Peterson (DEV)
14	DF	USA	Chad Marshall
15	MF	BRA	Stefani Miglioranzi
16	MF	USA	Brian Carroll
17	MF	NGA	Emmanuel Ekpo (INT)

No.	Pos.	Nation	Player
18	GK	USA	Kenny Schoeni (DEV)
19	DF	USA	Robbie Rogers (DEV)
20	MF	USA	Brian Plotkin (DEV)
22	MF	SCO	Adam Moffat (INT; DEV)
23	DF	VIN	Ezra Hendrickson
24	DF	USA	Jed Zayner (GA; DEV)
25	FW	USA	George Josten (DEV)
26	FW	USA	Cory Elenio (DEV)
27	DF	USA	Ryan Junge (DEV)
29	FW	HAI	Ricardo Pierre-Louis (INT; DEV)
30	GK	USA	Andy Gruenebaum
31	MF	USA	Kevin Burns (DEV)
32	MF	USA	Steven Lenhart (DEV)
37	MF	ZIM	Stanley Nyazamba (INT; DEV)

== Technical Staff ==
Position	Staff
President/General Manager	(United States) Mark McCullers
Technical Director	(United States) Brian Bliss
Head Coach	(Germany) Sigi Schmid
Assistant Coach	(Poland) Robert Warzycha
Assistant Coach	(United States) Mike Lapper
Assistant Coach	(Russia) Vadim Kirillov
Strength and Conditioning Coach	(United States) Steve Tashjian
Head Trainer	(United States) Jason Mathews
Assistant Trainer	(United States) Skylar Richards
Team Manager	(United States) Tucker Walther
Equipment Manager	(United States) Rusty Wummel

== Non-competitive ==
The Crew started preseason in Columbus and played games in Florida, California and England before returning to Ohio. The Crew brought in the following trialists during training camp: Osvaldo Alonso, Mamadou Bah, Sandro, Álvaro Pires, Lars Ricken, Roman Friedli and Michael Ricketts.

Unsigned draft picks Ryan Miller, Zola Short, Ricardo Pierre-Louis, Lukasz Tumicz, Cory Elenio, Steven Lenhart and George Josten also joined the team for preseason.

=== Preseason ===
February 9 Friendly	Columbus Crew	4-0	Kansas City Wizards	Bradenton, FL
	Lenhart 27'; Só 53'; Josten 80'; Pierre-Louis 82'	Report		Stadium: IMG Academy

February 13 Friendly	Columbus Crew	2-3	Chicago Fire	Bradenton, FL
	Rogers 26'; Gaven 50'	Report	Rolfe 14'; Frankowski 28', 30'	Stadium: IMG Academy

February 14 Friendly	Columbus Crew	2-0	U.S. U-17 National Team	Bradenton, FL
	Elenio 5'; Josten 15'	Report		Stadium: IMG Academy

February 16 Friendly	Columbus Crew	2-0	South Florida Bulls	Bradenton, FL
	Oughton 5'; Josten 53'	Report		Stadium: IMG Academy

February 22 Friendly	San Jose Earthquakes	2-1	Columbus Crew	San Luis Obispo, CA
	Kamara 17', 54'; Cochrane (yellow card) 36'; Garcia (yellow card) 42'	Report	Miglioranzi (yellow card) 11'; Gaven 34'	Stadium: Alex G. Spanos Stadium

February 23 Michael Hoefflin Foundation Benefit Match	Chivas USA	1-2	Columbus Crew	Santa Clarita, CA
	Harris 9'; Kljestan (yellow card) 56'	Report	Evans 39'; Rogers 59'	Stadium: Cougar Stadium

February 25 Friendly	Ventura County Fusion	1-0	Columbus Crew	Ventura, CA
	Garcia 12'	Report		Stadium: Buena High School

March 6 Friendly	Blackburn Rovers Reserves	0-1	Columbus Crew	Brockhall Village, England
		Report	Moffat 23'	Stadium: Brockhall Training Ground

March 7 Friendly	Everton F.C. Reserves	1-0	Columbus Crew	Liverpool, England
	58'	Report		Stadium: Finch Farm

March 22 Friendly	Columbus Crew	1-0	A.D. Isidro Metapán	Columbus, OH
	Hejduk (yellow card) 37'; Hernández 67'	Report	Posadas (yellow card) 71'	Stadium: Columbus Crew Stadium

=== Midseason ===
April 13 Friendly	Cleveland City Stars	2-2	Columbus Crew	Parma, OH
	MacGregor 4'; Williams 35'	Report	Lenhart 76'; Miglioranzi (yellow card) 89'; Hernández 92'	Stadium: Byers Field

April 29 Connor Senn Memorial Game	Ohio State Buckeyes	1-4	Columbus Crew	Columbus, OH
7:00 PM EDT	Thiam	Report	Garey, Josten,	Stadium: Jesse Owens Memorial Stadium; Attendance: 2,274

July 9 Friendly	Columbus Crew	2-1	Club Atlético Independiente	Columbus, OH
5:00 PM EDT	Rogers 63'; Garey 67'	Report	Vitti 83'	Stadium: Columbus Crew Stadium

July 20 Friendly	Columbus Crew	1-3	West Ham United F.C.	Columbus, OH
5:00 PM EDT	Garey 20'	Report	Ashton 6'; Evans 26' (o.g.); Reid 52'	Stadium: Columbus Crew Stadium; Referee: Ben Chaouf

August 25 Friendly	Columbus Crew	3-1	Cleveland City Stars	Obetz, OH
11:00 AM EDT	Noonan; Lenhart; Oughton	Report	Goal	Stadium: Crew Training Center

== Competitive ==
=== Overview ===
Competition	First match	Last match	Starting round	Final position	Record							
Competition	First match	Last match	Starting round	Final position	Pld	W	D	L	GF	GA	GD	Win %
Major League Soccer	March 29, 2008	October 26, 2008	Matchday 1	Winner	30	17	6	7	50	36	+14	56.67
MLS Cup Playoffs	November 1, 2008	November 23, 2008	Conference Semifinals	Winners	4	3	1	0	8	3	+5	75.00
U.S. Open Cup	May 27, 2008	June 10, 2008	Qualification Semifinals	Qualification Finals	2	1	0	1	4	3	+1	50.00
Total					36	21	7	8	62	42	+20	58.33

Source: Competitions

=== MLS ===
==== Standings ====
===== Eastern Conference =====
Pos	Team	Pld	W	L	T	GF	GA	GD	Pts	Qualification
1	Columbus Crew	30	17	7	6	50	36	+14	57	MLS Cup Playoffs
2	Chicago Fire	30	13	10	7	44	33	+11	46	MLS Cup Playoffs
3	New England Revolution	30	12	11	7	40	43	−3	43	MLS Cup Playoffs
4	Kansas City Wizards	30	11	10	9	37	39	−2	42	MLS Cup Playoffs
5	New York Red Bulls	30	10	11	9	42	48	−6	39	MLS Cup Playoffs

Source: MLS

===== Overall table =====
Pos	Team	Pld	W	L	T	GF	GA	GD	Pts	Qualification
1	Columbus Crew (C, S)	30	17	7	6	50	36	+14	57	CONCACAF Champions League
2	Houston Dynamo	30	13	5	12	45	32	+13	51	CONCACAF Champions League
3	Chicago Fire	30	13	10	7	44	33	+11	46	North American SuperLiga
4	Chivas USA	30	12	11	7	40	41	−1	43	North American SuperLiga
5	New England Revolution	30	12	11	7	40	43	−3	43	North American SuperLiga

Source: MLS
Rules for classification: 1) points; 2) head-to-head record; 3) goal difference; 4) number of goals scored
(C) Champions; (S) Supporters' Shield

==== Results summary ====
Overall								Home						Away					
Pld	Pts	W	L	T	GF	GA	GD	W	L	T	GF	GA	GD	W	L	T	GF	GA	GD
30	57	17	7	6	50	36	+14	11	2	2	30	15	+15	6	5	4	20	21	−1

==== Results by round ====
Round	1	2	3	4	5	6	7	8	9	10	11	12	13	14	15	16	17	18	19	20	21	22	23	24	25	26	27	28	29	30
Stadium	H	A	H	A	H	H	A	A	H	A	H	A	A	H	H	A	H	A	A	H	H	A	H	A	H	A	H	A	A	H
Result	W	L	W	W	W	W	W	T	L	L	L	W	T	W	T	L	T	W	L	W	W	W	W	T	W	W	W	T	L	W

Source: Columbus results
A = Away; H = Home; W = Win; L = Loss; T = Tie

==== Match results ====
March 29 1	Columbus Crew	2–0	Toronto FC	Columbus, OH
	Hejduk (yellow card) 10'; Moffat 26'; Moreno 76'	Report	Edu (yellow card) 55'	Stadium: Columbus Crew Stadium; Attendance: 13,843; Referee: Baldomero Toledo; Assistant referees: Anthony Vasoli; Nate Clement; Fourth official: Jorge Gonzalez

April 5 2	New York Red Bulls	2–0	Columbus Crew	East Rutherford, NJ
7:30 PM EDT	van den Bergh 1'; Goldthwaite 8'; Parke (yellow card) 65' (yellow-red card) 81'	Report		Stadium: Giants Stadium; Attendance: 17,119; Referee: Alex Prus; Assistant referees: Greg Barkey; Bill Dittmar; Fourth official: Jorge Gonzalez

April 12 3	Columbus Crew	4–3	Chivas USA	Columbus, OH
7:30 PM EDT	Gaven (yellow card) 22'; Barros Schelotto 26' (pen.), (yellow card) 90+4'; Moreno 35'; Moffat (yellow card) 48'; Rogers 71', 82'; Padula (yellow card) 75'	Report	Kljestan 33', (red card) 84'; Bornstein (yellow card) 37'; Marsch (yellow card) 68', (goal) 72'; Nagamura 78'; Mendoza (yellow card) 13' (yellow-red card) 83'	Stadium: Columbus Crew Stadium; Attendance: 6,733; Referee: Ricardo Salazar; Assistant referees: George Gansner; Greg Boles; Fourth official: Hilario Grajeda

April 17 4	D.C. United	1–2	Columbus Crew	Washington, D.C.
8:00 PM EDT	Namoff 42'	Report	Carroll (yellow card) 29'; Moreno 32'; Peralta 43' (o.g.); O'Rourke (yellow card) 57'; Hesmer (yellow card) 83'	Stadium: Robert F. Kennedy Memorial Stadium; Attendance: 13,329; Referee: Jair Marrufo; Assistant referees: C.J. Morgante; Steve Taylor; Fourth official: Alex Prus

April 26 5	Columbus Crew	1–0	Houston Dynamo	Columbus, OH
7:30 PM EDT	Moreno 22'; Moffat (yellow card) 48'; Hesmer (yellow card) 90+1'; Hejduk (yellow card) 90+6'	Report	Boswell (yellow card) 28'	Stadium: Columbus Crew Stadium; Attendance: 15,271; Referee: Terry Vaughn; Assistant referees: Chris Strickland; James Conlee; Fourth official: Andrew Chapin

May 3 6	Columbus Crew	2–1	Kansas City Wizards	Columbus, OH
7:30 PM EDT	Moffat 4'; Rogers 34'; Hejduk (yellow card) 36'; Evans (yellow card) 90'	Report	Espinoza (red card) 36'; López (yellow card) 58', (goal) 79' (pen.)	Stadium: Columbus Crew Stadium; Attendance: 10,447; Referee: Mark Geiger; Assistant referees: Craig Lowry; Peter Balciunas; Fourth official: Hilario Grajeda

May 10 7	San Jose Earthquakes	2–3	Columbus Crew	Santa Clara, CA
10:00 PM EDT	Riley (yellow card) 8'; Corrales 42'; Johnson 88'	Report	Rogers 73', 80'; Evans 82'	Stadium: Buck Shaw Stadium; Attendance: 9,318; Referee: Jair Marrufo; Assistant referees: Emiliano Monje; Greg Boles; Fourth official: Richard Heron

May 17 8	Toronto FC	0–0	Columbus Crew	Toronto, ON
3:30 PM EDT		Report	Barros Schelotto (yellow card) 90'	Stadium: BMO Field; Attendance: 20,358; Referee: Kevin Stott; Assistant referees: George Gansner; Darren Clark; Fourth official: Mauricio Navarro

May 24 9	Columbus Crew	0–1	New England Revolution	Columbus, OH
7:30 PM EDT	Hejduk (yellow card) 41'; Hendrickson (yellow card) 90'; Marshall (yellow card) 90+3'	Report	Nyassi (yellow card) 47'; Dube 89'	Stadium: Columbus Crew Stadium; Attendance: 15,621; Referee: Richard Heron; Assistant referees: Bill Dittmar; Eric Boria; Fourth official: Hilario Grajeda

May 31 10	Chivas USA	2–0	Columbus Crew	Carson, CA
10:30 PM EDT	Flores 19'; Marsch 21'; Burling (yellow card) 42'; Braun (yellow card) 61'; Harris (yellow card) 82'	Report	O'Rourke (red card) 22'; Moffat (yellow card) 49'	Stadium: The Home Depot Center; Attendance: 12,388; Referee: Fernando Galvan; Assistant referees: Chris Strickland; Fabio Tovar; Fourth official: Baldomero Toledo

June 7 11	Columbus Crew	0–2	San Jose Earthquakes	Columbus, OH
7:30 PM EDT	Moreno (yellow card) 67'; Rogers (yellow card) 76'; Evans (red card) 80'	Report	Johnson 10'; Riley (yellow card) 33' (yellow-red card) 85'; Corrales 60'; Cochrane (yellow card) 65'; Gray (yellow card) 69'; Denton (yellow card) 82'	Stadium: Columbus Crew Stadium; Attendance: 11,704; Referee: Ricardo Salazar; Assistant referees: Greg Barkey; Peter Manikowski; Fourth official: Hilario Grajeda

June 14 12	Kansas City Wizards	0–3	Columbus Crew	Kansas City, MO
8:00 PM EDT	Conrad (yellow card) 67'; López (yellow card) 67'	Report	Marshall 3'; Moreno 20', 67'; O'Rourke (yellow card) 44'; Iro (yellow card) 65'	Stadium: CommunityAmerica Ballpark; Attendance: 10,385; Referee: Terry Vaughn; Assistant referees: Greg Barkey; Jason Cullum; Fourth official: Shane Moody

June 21 13	Los Angeles Galaxy	3–3	Columbus Crew	Carson, CA
10:30 PM EDT	Donovan 4', 83' (pen.); Franklin (yellow card) 25'; Buddle 47'; Xavier (yellow card) 87'	Report	Evans 67'; Barros Schelotto 71' (pen.); Lenhart 88'	Stadium: The Home Depot Center; Attendance: 27,000; Referee: Mark Geiger; Assistant referees: Darren Clark; Emiliano Monje; Fourth official: Ramon Hernandez

June 28 14	Columbus Crew	2–1	Colorado Rapids	Columbus, OH
7:30 PM EDT	Ekpo (yellow card) 19', (goal) 70'; Barros Schelotto 53' (pen.); Iro (yellow card) 87'	Report	LaBrocca 60'	Stadium: Columbus Crew Stadium; Attendance: 12,254; Referee: Baldomero Toledo; Assistant referees: Anthony Vasoli; Sean Hurd; Fourth official: Mikael Lundqvist

July 5 15	Columbus Crew	2–2	Chicago Fire	Columbus, OH
8:00 PM EDT	Ekpo 36'; Hejduk (yellow card) 71'; Miglioranzi (yellow card) 85'; Lenhart 87'; O'Rourke (yellow card) 89'	Report	Rolfe 8'; Carr 25'; Segares (yellow card) 53'; Soumaré (yellow card) 89'; Prideaux (yellow card) 90'	Stadium: Columbus Crew Stadium; Attendance: 17,172; Referee: Kevin Stott; Assistant referees: Sean Hurd; Michael Salyers; Fourth official: Joe Caroccio

July 12 16	Real Salt Lake	2–0	Columbus Crew	Salt Lake City, UT
9:00 PM EDT	Morales 4'; Beckerman (yellow card) 78'; Findley 78'; Beltran (yellow card) 81'; Borchers (yellow card) 90'	Report	Oughton (yellow card) 65'	Stadium: Rice–Eccles Stadium; Attendance: 12,378; Referee: Jair Marrufo; Assistant referees: Craig Lowry; Fabio Tovar; Fourth official: Richard Heron

July 17 17	Columbus Crew	3–3	Kansas City Wizards	Columbus, OH
8:00 PM EDT	Barros Schelotto 26', (yellow card) 72'; Moreno 33'; Marshall 38'; Rogers (yellow card) 39'	Report	Hejduk 22' (o.g); Espinoza 24'; Morsink (yellow card) 59'; Wolff 75'; Harrington (yellow card) 81'	Stadium: Columbus Crew Stadium; Attendance: 16,117; Referee: Abiodun Okulaja; Assistant referees: C.J. Morgante; Paul Scott; Fourth official: Shane Moody

July 27 18	Colorado Rapids	0–2	Columbus Crew	Commerce City, CO
9:30 PM EDT	LaBrocca (yellow card) 45'	Report	O'Rourke (yellow card) 13'; Lenhart 21', (red card) 42'; Hejduk (yellow card) 60'; Garey 75'; Iro (yellow card) 80'	Stadium: Dick's Sporting Goods Park; Attendance: 10,647; Referee: Shane Moody; Assistant referees: Bill Dittmar; Steve Taylor; Fourth official: Alex Prus

August 2 19	Houston Dynamo	2–0	Columbus Crew	Houston, TX
8:30 PM EDT	Davis 13'; Jaqua (yellow card) 29'; Ching 43'	Report	Gaven (yellow card) 32'; Hendrickson (yellow card) 37'	Stadium: Robertson Stadium; Attendance: 15,371; Referee: Steven Depiero; Assistant referees: Joe Fletcher; Peter Manikowski; Fourth official: Jasen Anno

August 16 20	Columbus Crew	2–1	FC Dallas	Columbus, OH
7:30 PM EDT	Carroll (yellow card) 56', (goal) 62'; Evans 65'	Report	Moor (yellow card) 29'; Cunningham 35'; Wagner (yellow card) 50'	Stadium: Columbus Crew Stadium; Attendance: 17,647; Referee: Ricardo Salazar; Assistant referees: Bill Dittmar; Jason Cullum; Fourth official: Hilario Grajeda

August 23 21	Columbus Crew	3–0	Real Salt Lake	Columbus, OH
7:30 PM EDT	Marshall 15'; Barros Schelotto 25' (pen.); Hejduk (yellow card) 26'; Evans 55'; O'Rourke (yellow card) 65'	Report	Olave (yellow card) 7'	Stadium: Columbus Crew Stadium; Attendance: 12,448; Referee: Terry Vaughn; Assistant referees: Chris Strickland; Claudiu Badea; Fourth official: Hilario Grajeda

August 30 22	FC Dallas	1–2	Columbus Crew	Frisco, Texas
9:00 PM EDT	Cunningham 35'	Report	Iron (yellow card) 27'; Evans (yellow card) 30'; Moreno 37'; Gaven 40'	Stadium: Toyota Stadium; Attendance: 10,590; Referee: Ramon Hernandez; Assistant referees: Anthony Vasoli; Greg Boles; Fourth official: Jair Marrufo

September 6 23	Columbus Crew	4–0	New England Revolution	Columbus, OH
7:30 PM EDT	Barros Schelotto 39'; Iro 45'; Garey 67', 90', (yellow card) 83'	Report	Albright (yellow card) 23'; Joseph (yellow card) 50'; Igwe (yellow card) 59'	Stadium: Columbus Crew Stadium; Attendance: 16,918; Referee: Mark Geiger; Assistant referees: Steve Taylor; Eric Boria; Fourth official: Fernando Galvan

September 13 24	Toronto FC	1–1	Columbus Crew	Toronto, ON
3:30 PM EDT	Robinson 6'	Report	Noonan 40'	Stadium: BMO Field; Attendance: 19,657; Referee: Ricardo Salazar; Assistant referees: Héctor Vergara; Nate Clement; Fourth official: Mark Geiger

September 18 25	Columbus Crew	3–1	New York Red Bulls	Columbus, OH
7:00 PM EDT	Hejduk 41'; Rogers 46'; Gaven 85'	Report	Ángel 21'; Boyens (yellow card) 34'; Cichero (yellow card) 52'; Richards (yellow card) 68'; Goldthwaite (red card) 89'	Stadium: Columbus Crew Stadium; Attendance: 10,881; Referee: Alex Prus; Assistant referees: Steve Taylor; Michael Salyers; Fourth official: Hilario Grajeda

September 27 26	New England Revolution	0–1	Columbus Crew	Foxborough, MA
7:30 PM EDT	Joseph (yellow card) 90'	Report	Hejduk (yellow card) 6' (red card) 65'; Marshall 35'; Hesmer (yellow card) 90'	Stadium: Gillette Stadium; Attendance: 15,035; Referee: Terry Vaughn; Assistant referees: Rob Fereday; Jason Cullum; Fourth official: Jorge Gonzalez

October 4 27	Columbus Crew	1–0	Los Angeles Galaxy	Columbus, OH
7:30 PM EDT	Carroll (yellow card) 9'; Moreno 43'	Report	Vagenas (yellow card) 29'; Beckham (yellow card) 32'; Jordan (yellow card) 83'	Stadium: Columbus Crew Stadium; Attendance: 22,685; Referee: Jorge González; Assistant referees: Kermit Quisenberry; C.J. Morgante; Fourth official: Mikael Lundqvist

October 12 28	Chicago Fire	2–2	Columbus Crew	Bridgeview, IL
3:00 PM EDT	McBride 13', 79'; Busch (yellow card) 45'	Report	Gaven 59'; Barros Schelotto 61'; Carroll (yellow card) 86'	Stadium: Toyota Park; Attendance: 14,994; Referee: Shane Moody; Assistant referees: Greg Barkey; Sean Hurd; Fourth official: Abbey Okulaja

October 18 29	New York Red Bulls	3–1	Columbus Crew	East Rutherford, NJ
7:30 PM EDT	Kandji (yellow card) 30'; Ángel 48', 76'; van den Bergh (yellow card) 82'; Cepero 83'; Boyens (yellow card) 90'	Report	Hendrickson (yellow card) 53'; Lenhart 62'; Noonan (yellow card) 82'	Stadium: Giants Stadium; Attendance: 18,546; Referee: Michael Kennedy; Assistant referees: Thomas Supple; Jason Cullum; Fourth official: Lee Suckle

October 26 30	Columbus Crew	1–0	D.C. United	Columbus, OH
5:00 PM EDT	Carroll (yellow card) 66'; Evans 77', (yellow card) 78'	Report	Emílio (yellow card) 25'; Burch (yellow card) 53'; McTavish (yellow card) 78'	Stadium: Columbus Crew Stadium; Attendance: 19,591; Referee: Mark Geiger; Assistant referees: Greg Barkey; Nate Clement; Fourth official: Hilario Grajeda

=== MLS Cup Playoffs ===
==== Conference Semifinals ====
November 1 Leg 1	Kansas City Wizards	1–1	Columbus Crew	Kansas City, KS
8:00 PM EDT	Jewsbury (yellow card) 40'; Arnaud 53'; Gomez (red card) 75'	Report	Padula (yellow card) 84'; Lenhart 90+2'; Carroll (yellow card) 90+3'	Stadium: CommunityAmerica Ballpark; Attendance: 10,385; Referee: Jorge González; Assistant referees: Chris Strickland; Corey Rockwell; Fourth official: Baldomero Toledo

November 8 Leg 2	Columbus Crew	2–0 (3–1 agg.)	Kansas City Wizards	Columbus, OH
7:30 PM EST	Evans 7', (yellow card) 63'; Rogers 57', (yellow card) 66'; Hejduk (yellow card) 87'; Ekpo (yellow card) 90'	Report	Arnaud (yellow card) 39'; Wahl (yellow card) 49'	Stadium: Columbus Crew Stadium; Attendance: 11,153; Referee: Ricardo Salazar; Assistant referees: Anthony Vasoli; Nate Clement; Fourth official: Mark Geiger

==== Conference Finals ====
November 13 Conference Finals	Columbus Crew	2–1	Chicago Fire	Columbus, OH
7:30 PM EST	Marshall 49'; Gaven 55'; O'Rourke (yellow card) 57'; Hesmer (yellow card) 90+2'	Report	Soumare (yellow card) 22'; McBride 29'; Segares (yellow card) 48'; Prideaux (yellow card) 67'	Stadium: Columbus Crew Stadium; Attendance: 14,688; Referee: Terry Vaughn; Assistant referees: Thomas Supple; Fabio Tovar; Fourth official: Richard Heron

==== MLS Cup ====
November 23 MLS Cup	New York Red Bulls	1–3	Columbus Crew	Carson, CA
3:30 PM EST	Leitch (yellow card) 4'; Wolyniec 51'	Report	Moreno 31'; Marshall 53'; Padula (yellow card) 68'; Hejduk 82'	Stadium: The Home Depot Center; Attendance: 27,000; Referee: Baldomero Toledo; Assistant referees: Greg Barkey; Kermit Quisenberry; Fourth official: Mark Geiger

=== U.S. Open Cup ===
May 27 Qualification Semifinals	Columbus Crew (MLS) (Ohio)	2–0	(Utah) Real Salt Lake (MLS)	Columbus, OH
7:30 PM EDT	Lenhart 26'; Rogers 53'; Ekpo (yellow card) 78'; Moffat (yellow card) 80'; Zayner (yellow card) 90+4'	Report	Kovalenko (red card) 49'	Stadium: Columbus Crew Stadium; Attendance: 4,816; Referee: Jeff Gontarek; Assistant referees: Mikael Lundqvist; Michael Szymanski; Fourth official: Hilario Grajeda

June 10 Qualification Final	Chicago Fire (MLS) (Illinois)	3–2 (a.e.t.)	(Ohio) Columbus Crew (MLS)	Peoria, IL
8:00 PM EDT	King 10'; Herron 65', 116' (pen.); Prideaux (yellow card) 82'	Report	Ekpo 63'; Garey 67'; Zayner (yellow card) 79'; Rogers (yellow card) 100'	Stadium: Shea Stadium; Attendance: 3,829; Referee: Tony Russo

== Reserve League ==
=== Overall table ===
Pos	Club	Pld	W	L	T	GF	GA	GD	Pts
1	Houston Dynamo Reserves (C)	12	9	1	2	33	15	+18	29
2	Kansas City Wizards Reserves	11	8	1	2	31	13	+18	26
3	Real Salt Lake Reserves	12	7	3	2	31	24	+7	23
4	Chicago Fire Reserves	12	5	5	2	25	22	+3	17
5	D.C. United Reserves	10	5	4	1	19	21	−2	16
5	Toronto FC Reserves	10	5	4	1	12	19	−7	16
7	Chivas USA Reserves	12	4	5	3	19	21	−2	15
7	San Jose Earthquakes Reserves	12	4	5	3	18	22	−4	15
7	FC Dallas Reserves	12	4	5	3	19	24	−5	15
10	Columbus Crew Reserves	11	4	5	2	13	13	0	14
11	Colorado Rapids Reserves	12	4	6	2	16	21	−5	14
12	New York Red Bulls Reserves	12	3	7	2	16	23	−7	11
13	New England Revolution Reserves	10	2	6	2	11	16	−5	8
14	Los Angeles Galaxy Reserves	12	1	8	3	15	23	−8	6

=== Match results ===
April 18 1	D.C. United	3-2	Columbus Crew	Washington, D.C.
	Stratford 49'; Barlow 62'; Cordeiro 90'	Report	Kirk 45' (o.g.); Garey 48'	Stadium: D.C. United Training Complex; Attendance: 104; Referee: Andrew Chapin

May 4 2	Columbus Crew	1-1	Kansas City Wizards	Obetz, OH
	Lenhart 22'; Zayner (yellow card) 59'; Evans (yellow card) 67'	Report	Pore 43'; Souter (yellow card) 77'	Stadium: Crew Training Center

May 17 3	Toronto FC	1-0	Columbus Crew	Toronto, Ontario
	Attakora 11'; James (yellow card) 35'; Dunivant (yellow card) 49'	Report		Stadium: BMO Field

May 25 4	Columbus Crew	1-0	New England Revolution	Columbus, OH
	Garey 10'	Report	Fernandez (yellow card) 52'	Stadium: Columbus Crew Stadium

June 15 5	Kansas City Wizards	2-3	Columbus Crew	Kansas City, MO
11:00 a.m. EST	Morsink (yellow card) 36'; Pore 42', 56' (pen.)	Report	Garey 7'; Peterson 12'; Evans (yellow card) 51'; Josten 89'	Stadium: Swope Park Training Center

June 25 6	Columbus Crew	0-1	D.C. United	Obetz, OH
	Zayner (yellow card) 58'; Hernández (yellow card) 86'	Report	Dyachenko 73'	Stadium: Crew Training Center

July 6 7	Columbus Crew	3-2	Chicago Fire	Columbus, OH
	Elenio 35'; Garey 53'; Peterson 73'	Report	Banner 44'; Hlavaty 48'	Stadium: Columbus Crew Stadium

September 3 8	Columbus Crew	Cancelled	Toronto FC

September 19 9	Columbus Crew	0-0	New York Red Bulls	Obetz, OH
		Report		Stadium: Crew Training Center

September 28 10	New England Revolution	1-0	Columbus Crew	Foxborough, MA
	Walker (yellow card) 8'; Tornaritis 76'; Igwe (yellow card) 91+'	Report		Stadium: Gillette Stadium

October 12 11	Chicago Fire	1-0	Columbus Crew	Bridgeview, IL
	Frankowski 90'	Report	Oughton (yellow card) 16'; Miglioranzi (yellow card) 30'	Stadium: Toyota Park

October 19 12	New York Red Bulls	1-3	Columbus Crew	Montclair, NJ
	Wolyniec 11'; Borman (yellow card) 87'	Report	Elenio 44', 86'; Garey 53'; Brunner (yellow card) 80'	Stadium: Sprague Field

== Statistics ==
=== Appearances and goals ===
Under "Apps" for each section, the first number represents the number of starts, and the second number represents appearances as a substitute.

No.	Pos	Nat	Player	Total		MLS		MLS Cup Playoffs		U.S. Open Cup	
No.	Pos	Nat	Player	Apps	Goals	Apps	Goals	Apps	Goals	Apps	Goals
1	GK	(United States) USA	William Hesmer	34	0	29+0	0	4+0	0	1+0	0
2	DF	(United States) USA	Frankie Hejduk	28	2	24+0	1	4+0	1	0+0	0
3	DF	(United States) USA	Brad Evans	32	6	18+8	5	4+0	1	1+1	0
4	DF	(Argentina) ARG	Gino Padula	18	0	14+0	0	4+0	0	0+0	0
5	DF	(United States) USA	Danny O'Rourke	34	0	28+0	0	4+0	0	2+0	0
6	DF	(England) ENG	Andy Iro	22	1	11+7	1	0+3	0	1+0	0
7	FW	(Argentina) ARG	Guillermo Barros Schelotto	31	7	27+0	7	4+0	0	0+0	0
8	DF	(New Zealand) NZL	Duncan Oughton	6	0	1+4	0	0+0	0	0+1	0
9	FW	(United States) USA	Jason Garey	11	4	0+10	3	0+0	0	0+1	1
10	FW	(Venezuela) VEN	Alejandro Moreno	33	10	27+0	9	4+0	1	2+0	0
11	FW	(United States) USA	Pat Noonan	11	1	6+5	1	0+0	0	0+0	0
12	MF	(United States) USA	Eddie Gaven	30	4	22+2	3	4+0	1	1+1	0
13	DF	(United States) USA	Andrew Peterson	3	0	1+0	0	0+0	0	0+2	0
14	DF	(United States) USA	Chad Marshall	34	6	29+0	4	4+0	2	1+0	0
15	MF	(Brazil) BRA	Stefani Miglioranzi	14	0	7+7	0	0+0	0	0+0	0
16	MF	(United States) USA	Brian Carroll	36	1	30+0	1	4+0	0	2+0	0
17	MF	(Nigeria) NGA	Emmanuel Ekpo	22	3	7+10	2	0+3	0	2+0	1
18	GK	(United States) USA	Kenny Schoeni	0	0	0+0	0	0+0	0	0+0	0
19	DF	(United States) USA	Robbie Rogers	33	8	26+1	6	4+0	1	1+1	1
20	MF	(United States) USA	Brian Plotkin	0	0	0+0	0	0+0	0	0+0	0
22	MF	(Scotland) SCO	Adam Moffat	8	2	6+1	2	0+0	0	1+0	0
23	FW	(Saint Vincent and the Grenadines) VIN	Ezra Hendrickson	14	0	7+6	0	0+1	0	0+0	0
24	DF	(United States) USA	Jed Zayner	8	0	2+4	0	0+0	0	2+0	0
25	FW	(United States) USA	George Josten	1	0	0+0	0	0+0	0	0+1	0
26	MF	(United States) USA	Cory Elenio	1	0	0+1	0	0+0	0	0+0	0
27	DF	(United States) USA	Ryan Junge	7	0	3+2	0	0+0	0	2+0	0
29	FW	(Haiti) HAI	Ricardo Pierre-Louis	0	0	0+0	0	0+0	0	0+0	0
30	GK	(United States) USA	Andy Gruenebaum	2	0	1+0	0	0+0	0	1+0	0
31	MF	(United States) USA	Kevin Burns	0	0	0+0	0	0+0	0	0+0	0
32	FW	(United States) USA	Steven Lenhart	14	6	3+7	4	0+2	1	2+0	1
37	MF	(Zimbabwe) ZIM	Stanley Nyazamba	0	0	0+0	0	0+0	0	0+0	0
			Own goal	0	1	-	1	-	0	-	0
Players who left Columbus during the season:
4	DF	(United States) USA	Leonard Griffin	0	0	0+0	0	0+0	0	0+0	0
11	FW	(Brazil) BRA	Guilherme Só	0	0	0+0	0	0+0	0	0+0	0
20	FW	(Argentina) ARG	Nicolás Hernández	5	0	1+4	0	0+0	0	0+0	0
21	DF	(United States) USA	Ryan Miller	0	0	0+0	0	0+0	0	0+0	0

=== Disciplinary record ===
No.	Pos.	Name	MLS		MLS Playoffs		U.S. Open Cup		Total	
No.	Pos.	Name	Booked	Sent off (straight red)	Booked	Sent off (straight red)	Booked	Sent off (straight red)	Booked	Sent off (straight red)
1	GK	(United States) William Hesmer	3	0	1	0	0	0	4	0
2	DF	(United States) Frankie Hejduk	9	1	1	0	0	0	10	1
3	MF	(United States) Brad Evans	3	1	1	0	0	0	4	1
4	DF	(Argentina) Gino Padula	2	0	2	0	0	0	4	0
5	DF	(United States) Danny O'Rourke	5	1	1	0	0	0	6	1
6	DF	(England) Andy Iro	4	0	0	0	0	0	4	0
7	FW	(Argentina) Guillermo Barros Schelotto	3	0	0	0	0	0	3	0
8	DF	(New Zealand) Duncan Oughton	1	0	0	0	0	0	1	0
9	FW	(United States) Jason Garey	1	0	0	0	0	0	1	0
10	FW	(Venezuela) Alejandro Moreno	1	0	0	0	0	0	1	0
11	FW	(United States) Pat Noonan	1	0	0	0	0	0	1	0
12	MF	(United States) Eddie Gaven	2	0	0	0	0	0	2	0
13	MF	(United States) Andrew Peterson	0	0	0	0	0	0	0	0
14	DF	(United States) Chad Marshall	2	0	0	0	0	0	2	0
15	MF	(Brazil) Stefani Miglioranzi	1	0	0	0	0	0	1	0
16	MF	(United States) Brian Carroll	5	0	1	0	0	0	6	0
17	MF	(Nigeria) Emmanuel Ekpo	1	0	1	0	1	0	3	0
18	GK	(United States) Kenny Schoeni	0	0	0	0	0	0	0	0
19	MF	(United States) Robbie Rogers	2	0	1	0	1	0	4	0
20	MF	(United States) Brian Plotkin	0	0	0	0	0	0	0	0
22	MF	(Scotland) Adam Moffat	3	0	0	0	1	0	4	0
23	DF	(Saint Vincent and the Grenadines) Ezra Hendrickson	3	0	0	0	0	0	3	0
24	DF	(United States) Jed Zayner	0	0	0	0	2	0	2	0
25	FW	(United States) George Josten	0	0	0	0	0	0	0	0
26	MF	(United States) Cory Elenio	0	0	0	0	0	0	0	0
27	DF	(United States) Ryan Junge	0	0	0	0	0	0	0	0
29	FW	(Haiti) Ricardo Pierre-Louis	0	0	0	0	0	0	0	0
30	GK	(United States) Andy Gruenebaum	0	0	0	0	0	0	0	0
31	MF	(United States) Kevin Burns	0	0	0	0	0	0	0	0
32	FW	(United States) Steven Lenhart	0	1	0	0	0	0	0	1
37	MF	(Zimbabwe) Stanley Nyazamba	0	0	0	0	0	0	0	0
Players who left Columbus during the season:
4	DF	(United States) Leonard Griffin	0	0	0	0	0	0	0	0
11	FW	(Brazil) Guilherme Só	0	0	0	0	0	0	0	0
20	FW	(Argentina) Nicolás Hernández	0	0	0	0	0	0	0	0
21	DF	(United States) Ryan Miller	0	0	0	0	0	0	0	0

=== Clean sheets ===
No.	Name	MLS	MLS Playoffs	U.S. Open Cup	Total	Games Played		
No.	Name	1	(United States) William Hesmer	10	1	0	11	34
18	(United States) Kenny Schoeni	0	0	0	0	0		
30	(United States) Andy Gruenebaum	0	0	1	1	2		

Source: Columbus stats

== Reserve League Statistics ==
=== Appearances and goals ===
Under "Apps" for each section, the first number represents the number of starts, and the second number represents appearances as a substitute.

No.	Pos	Nat	Player	Total		MLS Reserve League	
No.	Pos	Nat	Player	Apps	Goals	Apps	Goals
-	DF	(United States) USA	Eric Brunner	3	0	1+2	0
17	MF	(Nigeria) NGA	Emmanuel Ekpo	5	0	5+0	0
26	MF	(United States) USA	Cory Elenio	7	3	5+2	3
3	DF	(United States) USA	Brad Evans	3	0	3+0	0
9	FW	(United States) USA	Jason Garey	11	5	10+1	5
12	MF	(United States) USA	Eddie Gaven	0	0	0+0	0
-	MF	(United States) USA	Steve Gillespie	1	0	0+1	0
30	GK	(United States) USA	Andy Gruenebaum	7	0	7+0	0
23	FW	(Saint Vincent and the Grenadines) VIN	Ezra Hendrickson	4	0	4+0	0
20	FW	(Argentina) ARG	Nicolás Hernández	5	0	4+1	0
-	MF	(United States) USA	Eddie Hertsenberg	1	0	0+1	0
-	FW	(United States) USA	Jason Hotchkin	0	0	0+0	0
6	DF	(England) ENG	Andy Iro	7	0	7+0	0
25	FW	(United States) USA	George Josten	11	1	8+3	1
27	DF	(United States) USA	Ryan Junge	7	0	5+2	0
-	FW	(United States) USA	Ryan Kustos	1	0	0+1	0
-	GK	(United States) USA	Casey Latchem	0	0	0+0	0
32	FW	(United States) USA	Steven Lenhart	9	1	7+2	1
28	DF	(United States) USA	Devon McKenney	5	0	4+1	0
15	MF	(Brazil) BRA	Stefani Miglioranzi	5	0	5+0	0
21	DF	(United States) USA	Ryan Miller	7	0	4+3	0
22	MF	(Scotland) SCO	Adam Moffat	1	0	1+0	0
34	MF	(United States) USA	Craig Neal	3	0	0+3	0
37	MF	(Zimbabwe) ZIM	Stanley Nyazamba	4	0	4+0	0
8	DF	(New Zealand) NZL	Duncan Oughton	8	0	8+0	0
4	DF	(Argentina) ARG	Gino Padula	2	0	2+0	0
13	DF	(United States) USA	Andrew Peterson	11	2	10+1	2
29	FW	(Haiti) HAI	Ricardo Pierre-Louis	5	0	2+3	0
20	MF	(United States) USA	Brian Plotkin	3	0	1+2	0
18	GK	(United States) USA	Kenny Schoeni	6	0	4+2	0
11	FW	(Brazil) BRA	Guilherme Só	4	0	1+3	0
-	MF	(United States) USA	Steve Traeger	1	0	0+1	0
24	DF	(United States) USA	Jed Zayner	10	0	10+0	0
			Own goal	0	1	-	1

=== Disciplinary record ===
No.	Pos.	Name	MLS Reserve League		Total	
No.	Pos.	Name	Booked	Sent off (straight red)	Booked	Sent off (straight red)
-	DF	(United States) Eric Brunner	1	0	1	0
17	MF	(Nigeria) Emmanuel Ekpo	0	0	0	0
26	MF	(United States) Cory Elenio	0	0	0	0
3	MF	(United States) Brad Evans	2	0	2	0
9	FW	(United States) Jason Garey	0	0	0	0
12	MF	(United States) Eddie Gaven	0	0	0	0
-	MF	(United States) Steve Gillespie	0	0	0	0
30	GK	(United States) Andy Gruenebaum	0	0	0	0
23	DF	(Saint Vincent and the Grenadines) Ezra Hendrickson	0	0	0	0
20	FW	(Argentina) Nicolás Hernández	1	0	1	0
-	MF	(United States) Eddie Hertsenberg	0	0	0	0
-	FW	(United States) Jason Hotchkin	0	0	0	0
6	DF	(England) Andy Iro	0	0	0	0
25	FW	(United States) George Josten	0	0	0	0
27	DF	(United States) Ryan Junge	0	0	0	0
-	FW	(United States) Ryan Kustos	0	0	0	0
-	GK	(United States) Casey Latchem	0	0	0	0
32	FW	(United States) Steven Lenhart	0	0	0	0
28	DF	(United States) Devon McKenney	0	0	0	0
15	MF	(Brazil) Stefani Miglioranzi	1	0	1	0
21	DF	(United States) Ryan Miller	0	0	0	0
22	MF	(Scotland) Adam Moffat	0	0	0	0
34	MF	(United States) Craig Neal	0	0	0	0
37	MF	(Zimbabwe) Stanley Nyazamba	0	0	0	0
8	DF	(New Zealand) Duncan Oughton	1	0	1	0
4	DF	(Argentina) Gino Padula	0	0	0	0
13	MF	(United States) Andrew Peterson	0	0	0	0
29	FW	(Haiti) Ricardo Pierre-Louis	0	0	0	0
20	MF	(United States) Brian Plotkin	0	0	0	0
18	GK	(United States) Kenny Schoeni	0	0	0	0
11	FW	(Brazil) Guilherme Só	0	0	0	0
-	MF	(United States) Steve Traeger	0	0	0	0
24	DF	(United States) Jed Zayner	2	0	2	0

=== Clean sheets ===
No.	Name	MLS Reserve League	Total	Games Played
30	(United States) Andy Gruenebaum	0	0	7
-	(United States) Casey Latchem	0	0	0
18	(United States) Kenny Schoeni	2	2	6

== Transfers ==
=== In ===
Pos.	Player	Transferred from	Fee/notes	Date	Source
DF	(England) Andy Iro	(United States) UC Santa Barbara Gauchos	Drafted in round 1 of the 2008 MLS SuperDraft	January 18, 2008	
FW	(Argentina) Nicolás Hernández	(United States) Colorado Rapids	Traded for Tim Ward and a third round draft pick in the 2009 MLS Supplemental Draft	February 27, 2008	
MF	(United States) Kevin Burns	(United States) Rochester Raging Rhinos	Drafted in round 4 of the 2007 MLS Supplemental Draft. Signed to a developmental contract.	March 20, 2008	
FW	(United States) George Josten	(United States) Michigan Bucks	Drafted in round 2 of the 2008 MLS SuperDraft. Signed to a developmental contract.	March 27, 2008	
DF	(United States) Ryan Miller	(United States) Indiana Invaders	Drafted in round 3 of the 2008 MLS SuperDraft. Signed to a developmental contract.	March 27, 2008	
FW	(United States) Steven Lenhart	(United States) Southern California Seahorses	Drafted in round 4 of the 2008 MLS SuperDraft. Signed to a developmental contract.	March 27, 2008	
GK	(United States) Kenny Schoeni	(United States) MLS Pool	Signed to a developmental contract.	March 20, 2008	
DF	(Argentina) Gino Padula	(France) Montpellier HSC	Signed via discovery	March 24, 2008	
FW	(Brazil) Guilherme Só	(Brazil) Brasil de Pelotas	Signed via discovery	March 28, 2008	
FW	(Nigeria) Emmanuel Ekpo	(Nigeria) Enyimba International	Signed via discovery	April 15, 2008	
MF	(United States) Cory Elenio	(United States) Evansville Purple Aces	Drafted in round 2 of the 2008 MLS Supplemental Draft. Signed to a developmental contract.	May 23, 2008	
FW	(Haiti) Ricardo Pierre-Louis	(United States) Cape Cod Crusaders	Drafted in round 2 of the 2008 MLS SuperDraft	June 5, 2008	
FW	(United States) Pat Noonan	(United States) New England Revolution	Traded for allocation money, a first round draft pick in the 2009 MLS SuperDraft, and allocation order	August 7, 2008	
MF	(United States) Brian Plotkin	(United States) Chicago Fire	Signed to a developmental contract.	August 22, 2008	
MF	(Zimbabwe) Stanley Nyazamba	(United States) Richmond Kickers	Signed via discovery. Signed to a developmental contract.	September 16, 2008	

=== Out ===
Pos.	Player	Transferred to	Fee/notes	Date	Source
DF	(Chile) Marcos González	(Chile) Club Deportivo Universidad Católica	Transfer, terms undisclosed	January 24, 2008	
MF	(United States) Brandon Moss	Retired		January 25, 2008	
FW	(United States) Tim Ward	(United States) Colorado Rapids	Traded with a third round draft pick in the 2009 MLS Supplemental Draft for Nicolás Hernández	February 27, 2008	
DF	(Trinidad and Tobago) Andrei Pacheco	(Trinidad and Tobago) W Connection	Contract expired	March 3, 2008	
DF	(United States) Rusty Pierce	(United States) Wilmington Hammerheads	Contract expired	March 3, 2008	
MF	(United States) Jacob Thomas	Retired	Contract expired	March 3, 2008	
DF	(Brazil) Ricardo Virtuoso	(Switzerland) SC Zofingen	Contract expired	March 3, 2008	
DF	(United States) Leonard Griffin	(United States) Portland Timbers	Placed on waivers	April 2, 2008	
FW	(United States) Nicolás Hernández	(Costa Rica) Liga Deportiva Alajuelense	Placed on waivers	June 28, 2008	
FW	(Brazil) Guilherme Só	Retired	Placed on waivers	June 28, 2008	
DF	(United States) Ryan Miller	(United States) D.C. United	Placed on waivers	September 12, 2008	
DF	(United States) Brad Evans	(United States) Seattle Sounders FC	Drafted 10th in the 2008 MLS Expansion Draft	November 26, 2008	
FW	(United States) George Josten	(United States) Portland Timbers	Placed on waivers	November 26, 2008	
DF	(United States) Ryan Junge	(United States) Omaha Vipers	Placed on waivers	November 26, 2008	
DF	(United States) Andrew Peterson	(United States) Minnesota Thunder	Placed on waivers	November 26, 2008	
FW	(United States) Ricardo Pierre-Louis	(United States) Cleveland City Stars	Placed on waivers	November 26, 2008	
MF	(United States) Brian Plotkin	(United States) Carolina RailHawks	Placed on waivers	November 26, 2008	
MF	(United States) Kevin Burns	(United States) Columbus Crew	Placed on waivers	November 26, 2008	

=== Loans out ===
Pos.	Player	Loanee club	Length/Notes	Beginning	End	Source
DF	(United States) Ryan Miller	(United States) Cleveland City Stars				
FW	(United States) George Josten	(United States) Cleveland City Stars				
DF	(United States) Jed Zayner	(United States) Cleveland City Stars				

=== MLS Draft picks ===
Draft picks are not automatically signed to the team roster. Only those who are signed to a contract will be listed as transfers in. The picks for the Columbus Crew are listed below:

2008 Columbus Crew SuperDraft Picks
Round	Pick	Player	Position	College
1	6	(England) Andy Iro	DF	UC Santa Barbara
2	20	(United States) George Josten	FW	Gonzaga
2	22	(Haiti) Ricardo Pierre-Louis	FW	Lee
3	31	(United States) Ryan Miller	DF	Notre Dame
4	48	(United States) Steven Lenhart	FW	Azusa Pacific

2008 Columbus Crew Supplemental Draft Picks
Round	Pick	Player	Position	College
1	6	(United States) Billy Chiles	GK	Towson
2	20	(United States) Cory Elenio	FW	Evansville
3	34	(Poland) Lukasz Tumicz	FW	Rhode Island
3	38	(United States) Zola Short	DF	Virginia

== Awards ==
=== MLS Player of the Week ===
Week	Player	Opponent	Link
3	(Argentina) Guillermo Barros Schelotto	Chivas USA	
7	(United States) Robbie Rogers	San Jose Earthquakes	
17	(Argentina) Guillermo Barros Schelotto	Kansas City Wizards	
22	(Argentina) Guillermo Barros Schelotto	Real Salt Lake	
24	(Argentina) Guillermo Barros Schelotto	New England Revolution	
Playoff Week 3	(Argentina) Guillermo Barros Schelotto	Chicago Fire	
MLS Cup 2008	(Argentina) Guillermo Barros Schelotto	New York Red Bulls	

=== MLS Player of the Month ===
Month	Player	Stats	Link
August	(Argentina) Guillermo Barros Schelotto	6 assists, 1 goal	

=== 2008 MLS All-Star Game ===
Starters

- DF Frankie Hejduk
- DF Robbie Rogers

Reserves

- FW Guillermo Barros Schelotto

=== Postseason ===
MLS Most Valuable Player

- FW Guillermo Barros Schelotto

MLS Defender of the Year

- DF Chad Marshall

MLS Coach of the Year

- Sigi Schmid

MLS Best XI

- DF Chad Marshall
- DF Robbie Rogers
- FW Guillermo Barros Schelotto

=== Crew Team Awards ===
- Most Valuable Player – Guillermo Barros Schelotto
- Defensive Player of the Year – Chad Marshall
- Scoring Champion – Alejandro Moreno
- Man of the Year – Frankie Hejduk
- Coach's Award – Brian Carroll & Alejandro Moreno
- Newcomer of the Year – Gino Padula
- Goal of the Year – Robbie Rogers
- Humanitarian of the Year – Eddie Gaven
- Hardest Working Man of the Year – Brian Carroll
- Comeback Player of the Year – Chad Marshall
- Fan of the Year – Nordecke
