= Hertsenberg =

Hertsenberg is a surname. Notable people with the surname include:

- Antoinette Hertsenberg (born 1964), Dutch television presenter
- Eddie Hertsenberg (born 1986), American soccer player
