= 2008 MLS SuperDraft =

College draft for soccer teams

General information
- Sport: Soccer
- Date: January 18, 2008
- Time: 2:00pm (ET)
- Location: Baltimore, Maryland
- Network: ESPN2

Overview
- 56 total selections
- First selection: Chance Myers, Kansas City Wizards
- Most selections: Chicago Fire; Kansas City Wizards; Los Angeles Galaxy (6 selections)
- Fewest selections: San Jose Earthquakes; Chivas USA (1 selection)

The 2008 MLS SuperDraft took place on January 18, 2008 in Baltimore, Maryland. It was the ninth annual Major League Soccer SuperDraft. The first selection was made by the Kansas City Wizards, after acquiring the selection from the expansion San Jose Earthquakes. It was followed by the Supplemental Draft.

== Player selection ==
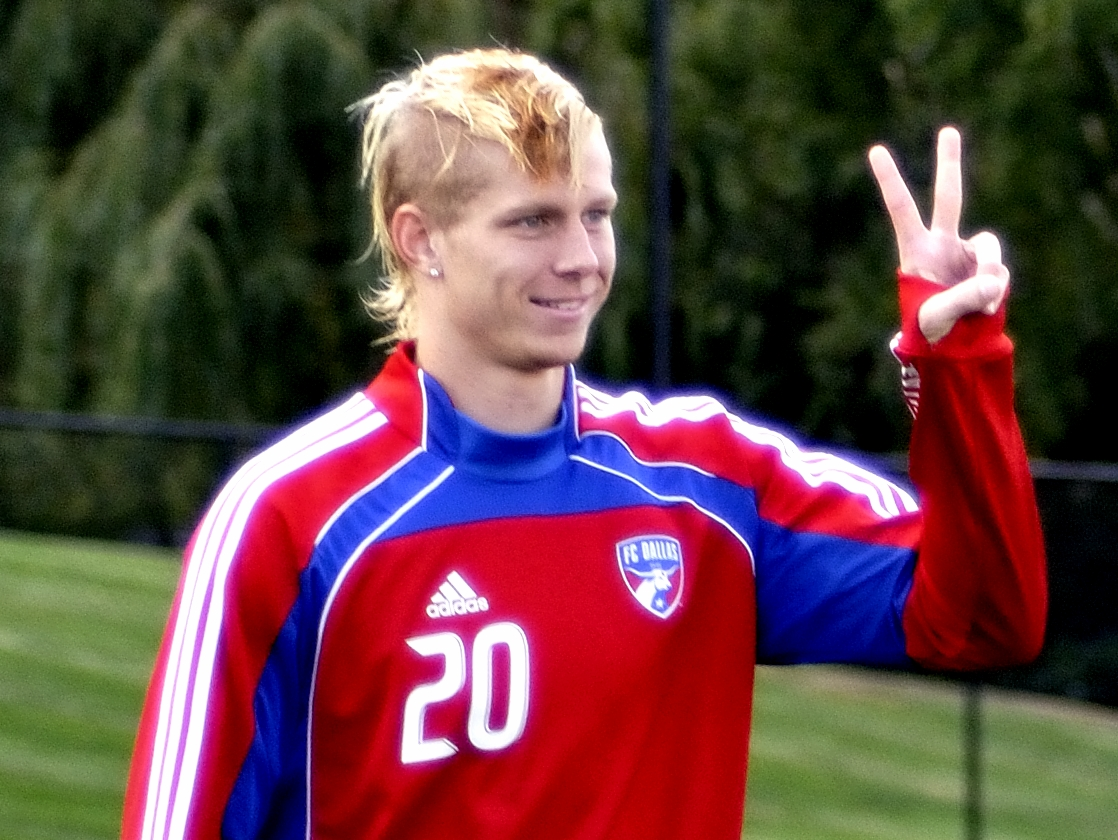
FC Dallas selected Brek Shea 2nd overall. In 2011, Shea was named an MLS All-Star and selected to the MLS Best XI. He earned 34 caps with the U.S. men's national team.

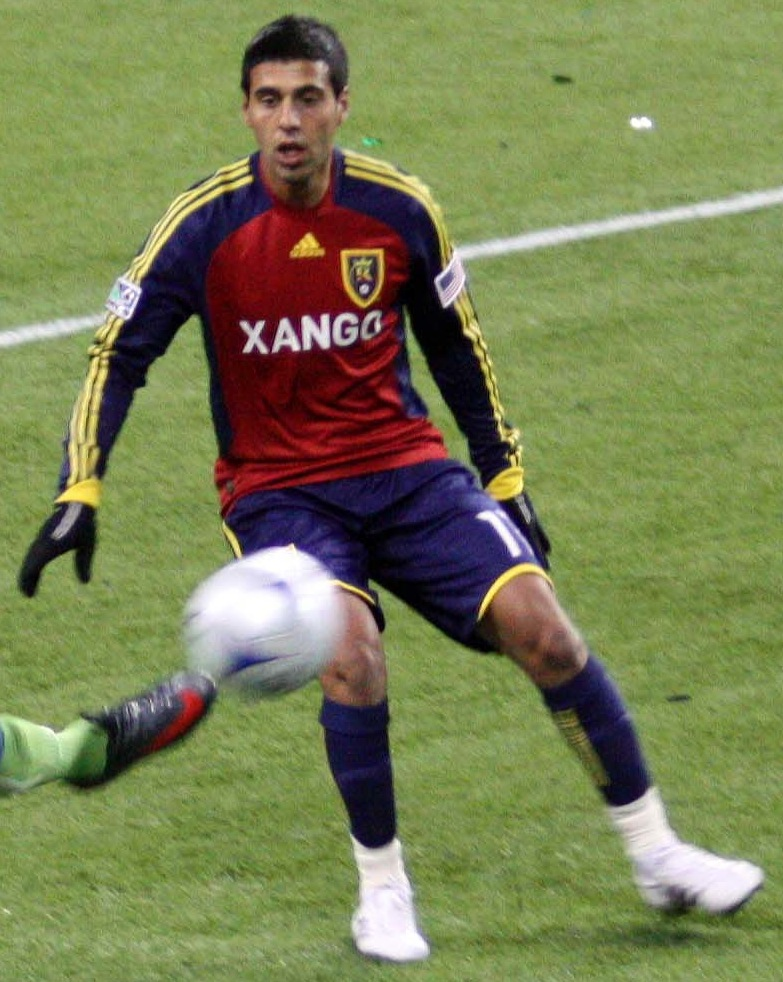
Real Salt Lake selected Tony Beltran 3rd overall. He was an MLS All-Star in 2013 and 2015.

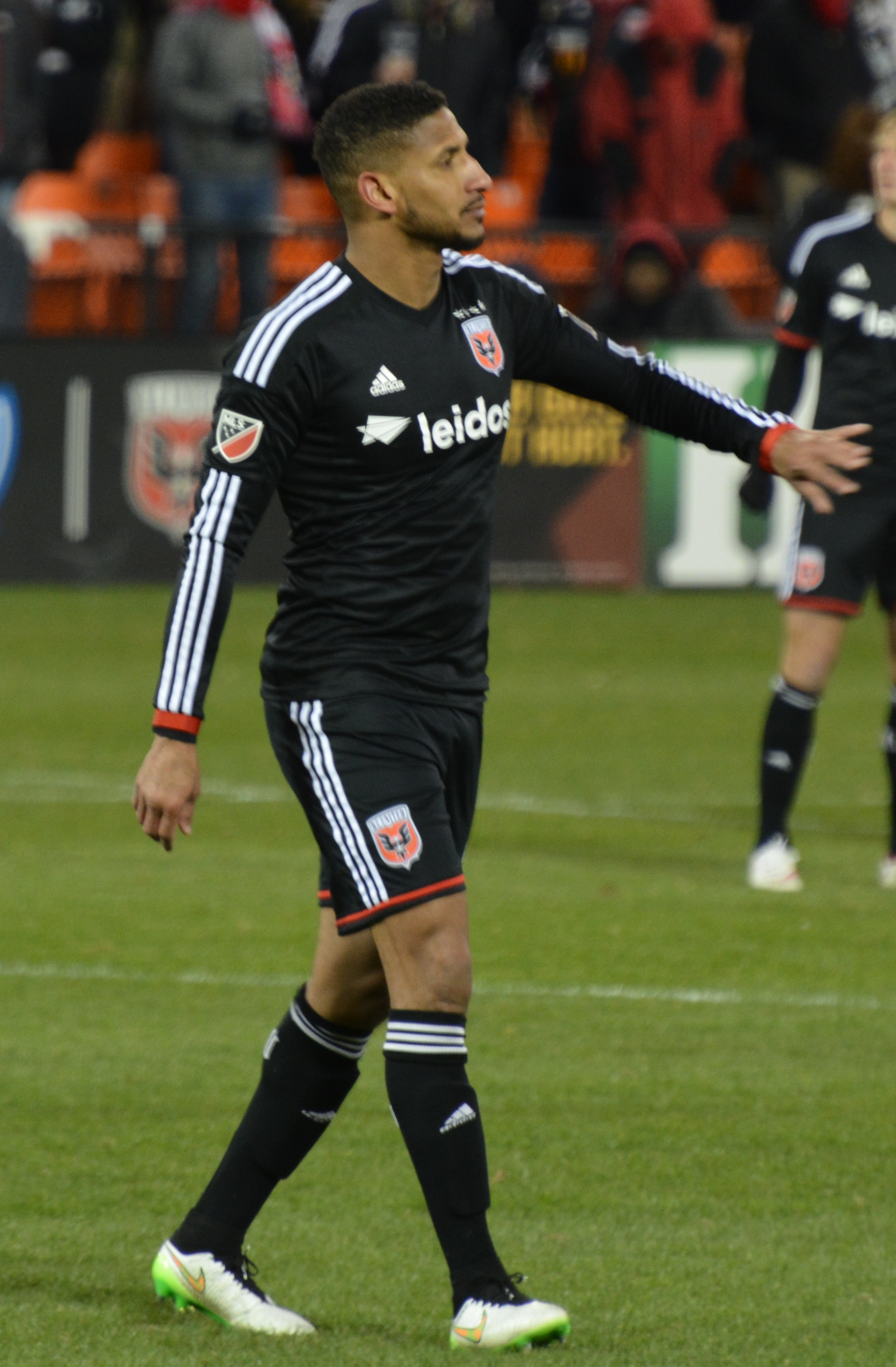
The LA Galaxy selected Sean Franklin 4th overall. The 2008 MLS Rookie of the Year is a 2x MLS All-Star.

Key

*	Denotes a player contracted under the Generation Adidas program
^	Denotes player who has been selected to an MLS All-Star Game
§	Denotes a player who won the MLS Rookie of the Year
†	Denotes player who has been selected for an MLS Best XI team
~	Denotes a player who won the MLS MVP

=== Round one ===
Pick #	MLS Team	Player	Position	Affiliation
1	Kansas City Wizards (Note: #1: San Jose Earthquakes → Kansas City Wizards. 2008-01-15: Kansas City acquired this pick from San Jose in exchange for defender Nick Garcia.)	(United States) Chance Myers*	D	UCLA; Ventura County Fusion
2	FC Dallas (Note: #2: Toronto FC → FC Dallas. 2007-03-20: FC Dallas acquired this pick and a partial allocation from Toronto FC in exchange for midfielder Richard Mulrooney.)	(United States) Brek Shea*^†	M	Generation adidas
3	Real Salt Lake	(United States) Tony Beltran*^	D	UCLA; Los Angeles Storm
4	Los Angeles Galaxy	(United States) Sean Franklin^§	D	Cal State Northridge; San Fernando Valley Quakes
5	Colorado Rapids	(United States) Ciaran O'Brien*	M	UC Santa Barbara; Tacoma Tide
6	Columbus Crew	(England) Andy Iro	D	UC Santa Barbara
7	Chicago Fire (Note: #7: New York Red Bulls → Chicago Fire. 2007-12-18: Chicago acquired this pick, a third-round selection in the 2011 MLS SuperDraft, and cash from New York in exchange for Juan Carlos Osorio.)	(Ghana) Patrick Nyarko*	F	Virginia Tech
8	FC Dallas	(United States) Josh Lambo*	GK	Generation adidas
9	Toronto FC (Note: #9: Chivas USA → Toronto FC. 2007-05-04: Toronto FC acquired this pick from Chivas USA in exchange for midfielder Paulo Nagamura.)	(Trinidad and Tobago) Julius James	D	Connecticut
10	Toronto FC (Note: #10: D.C. United → Toronto FC. 2007-02-01: Toronto FC acquired this pick from D.C. United in exchange for midfielder Rod Dyachenko.)	(United States) Pat Phelan	M	Wake Forest
11	Kansas City Wizards	(Honduras) Roger Espinoza*	M	Ohio State
12	Chicago Fire	(United States) Dominic Cervi	GK	Tulsa
13	New England Revolution	(United States) Rob Valentino*	D	San Francisco; San Jose Frogs
14	Real Salt Lake (Note: #14: Houston → Toronto FC → Real Salt Lake. 2007-05-22: Real Salt Lake acquired this pick and forward Alecko Eskandarian from Toronto FC in exchange for forward Jeff Cunningham. Toronto FC had acquired this pick and defender Kevin Goldthwaite from Houston in exchange for midfielder Richard Mulrooney on 2007-04-19.)	(United States) David Horst	D	Old Dominion; Hampton Roads Piranhas

=== Round two ===
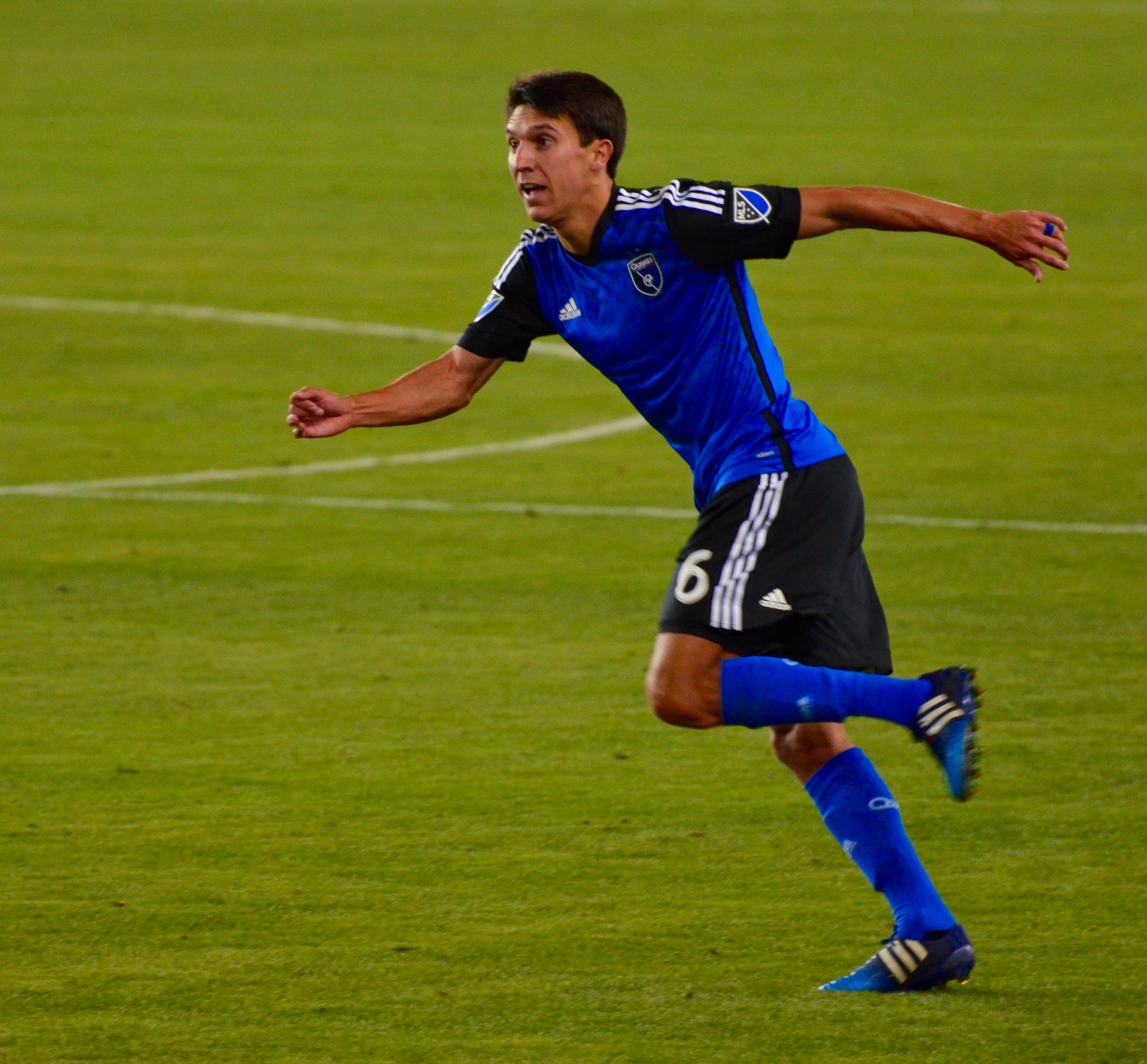
The San Jose Earthquakes selected Shea Salinas 15th overall. in 15 MLS seasons, he played in 375 games.

Pick #	MLS Team	Player	Position	Affiliation
15	San Jose Earthquakes	(United States) Shea Salinas	M	Furman; Carolina Dynamo
16	New York Red Bulls (Note: #16: Toronto FC → New York Red Bulls. 2007-04-19: New York acquired this pick and a partial allocation from Toronto FC in exchange for defender Marvell Wynne.)	(United States) Eric Brunner	D	Ohio State; Michigan Bucks
17	Real Salt Lake	(United States) Alex Nimo*	F	Generation adidas
18	New England Revolution (Note: #18: Los Angeles Galaxy → New England Revolution. 2007-01-12: New England acquired this pick and a first-round selection in the 2007 MLS SuperDraft from Los Angeles in exchange for a partial allocation.)	(United States) Michael Videira	M	Duke; Cary RailHawks U23's
19	FC Dallas (Note: #19: Colorado Rapids → FC Dallas. 2007-01-12: FC Dallas acquired this pick and a second-round selection in the 2007 MLS SuperDraft from Colorado in exchange for defender Greg Vanney, salary cap considerations, and the #36 pick.)	(United States) Eric Avila*	M	UC Santa Barbara; Ventura County Fusion
20	Columbus Crew	(United States) George Josten	M/F	Gonzaga; Michigan Bucks
21	Los Angeles Galaxy (Note: #21: New York Red Bulls → Los Angeles Galaxy. 2006-08-17: Los Angeles acquired this pick and a fourth-round selection in the 2007 MLS SuperDraft from New York in exchange for forward John Wolyniec.)	(United States) Ely Allen	F/M	Washington
22	Columbus Crew (Note: #22: FC Dallas → Columbus Crew. 2008-01-18: Columbus acquired this pick and the #31 pick from FC Dallas in exchange for Columbus' natural second-round and third-round picks in the 2010 MLS SuperDraft.)	(Haiti) Ricardo Pierre-Louis	F	Lee University; Cape Cod Crusaders
23	Kansas City Wizards (Note: #23: Chivas USA → Kansas City Wizards. 2007-02-21: Kansas City acquired a conditional 2008 SuperDraft selection, which became this pick, from Chivas USA in exchange for defender Alex Zotincă.)	(Cameroon) Yomby William	D	Old Dominion; Hampton Roads Piranhas
24	D.C. United	(United States) Andrew Jacobson	M	California
25	Kansas City Wizards (Note: #25: Kansas City Wizards → Los Angeles Galaxy → Kansas City Wizards. 2007-03-23: Kansas City re-acquired this pick from Los Angeles in exchange for defender Shavar Thomas. Los Angeles had acquired this pick and the #16 pick in the 2007 MLS SuperDraft from Kansas City in exchange for goalkeeper Kevin Hartman on 2006-12-15.)	(United States) Jonathan Leathers	D	Furman; Atlanta Silverbacks U23's
26	Chicago Fire	(United States) Peter Lowry	M/F	Santa Clara; San Jose Frogs
27	New England Revolution	(United States) Joe Germanese	M	Duke; Cary RailHawks U23's
28	Toronto FC (Note: #28: Houston → Los Angeles → Toronto FC. 2008-01-18: Toronto FC acquired this pick from Los Angeles in exchange for allocation money. Los Angeles had acquired this pick and defender Kelly Gray from Houston in exchange for forward Nate Jaqua on 2007-07-03.)	(United States) Brian Edwards	GK	Wake Forest

=== Round three ===
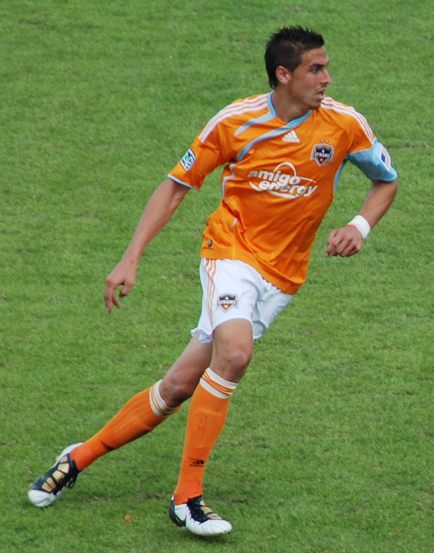
The Houston Dynamo selected Geoff Cameron 42nd overall. He is a 2x MLS All-Star and a 2009 MLS Best XI selection. Cameron earned 55 caps with the U.S. national team and was selected to the 2014 FIFA World Cup squad.

Pick #	MLS Team	Player	Position	Affiliation
29	Los Angeles Galaxy (Note: #29: San Jose Earthquakes → Los Angeles Galaxy. 2007-11-05: Los Angeles acquired this pick from San Jose in exchange for head coach Frank Yallop.)	(United States) Julian Valentin	D	Wake Forest
30	Toronto FC	(United States) Mike Zaher	D	UCLA; San Fernando Valley Quakes
31	Columbus Crew (Note: #31: Real Salt Lake → FC Dallas → Columbus Crew. 2008-01-18: Columbus acquired this pick and the #22 pick from FC Dallas in exchange for Columbus' natural second-round and third-round picks in the 2010 MLS SuperDraft. FC Dallas had been awarded this pick and a second-round selection in the 2009 MLS SuperDraft from Real Salt Lake on 2007-06-06 as compensation by the league for Real Salt Lake violating league procedure and business etiquette in speaking with and hiring Dallas goalkeeper coach Jeff Cassar. The league also fined RSL $20,000. (Note: Black, Michael (June 6, 2007). "RSL coach hire ends in fine, lost draft pick". Deseret News.))	(United States) Ryan Miller	D	Notre Dame; Indiana Invaders
32	New York Red Bulls (Note: #32: Los Angeles Galaxy → New York Red Bulls. 2007-11-20: New York acquired this pick from Los Angeles in exchange for forward Clint Mathis.)	(United States) Luke Sassano	M	California; San Jose Frogs
33	D.C. United (Note: #33: Colorado Rapids → D.C. United. 2006-12-15: D.C. United acquired this pick and a third-round selection in the 2007 MLS SuperDraft from Colorado in exchange for defender Brandon Prideaux.)	(United States) Ryan Cordeiro	M/F	Connecticut
34	Los Angeles Galaxy (Note: #34: Columbus Crew → Los Angeles Galaxy. 2007-01-19: Los Angeles acquired this pick from Columbus in exchange for midfielder Stefani Miglioranzi.)	(United States) Matt Allen	GK	Creighton; Des Moines Menace
35	Toronto FC (Note: #35: New York Red Bulls → Colorado Rapids → Toronto FC. 2007-04-19: Toronto FC acquired this pick, an allocation, and the rights to forward Riley O'Neill from Colorado in exchange for forward Conor Casey. Colorado had acquired the pick and a fourth-round selection in the 2009 MLS Supplemental Draft, which was canceled, from New York in exchange for defender Hunter Freeman on 2007-03-23.)	(Republic of Ireland) Joseph Lapira	F	Notre Dame; Baton Rouge Capitals
36	Colorado Rapids (Note: #36: FC Dallas → Colorado Rapids. 2007-01-12: Colorado acquired this pick, defender Greg Vanney, and salary cap considerations from FC Dallas in exchange for the #19 pick and a second-round selection in the 2007 MLS SuperDraft.)	(United States) Adrian Chevannes	D	SMU
37	Real Salt Lake (Note: #37: Chivas USA → Real Salt Lake. 2007-12-20: Real Salt Lake acquired this pick from Chivas USA in exchange for forward Atiba Harris. It was later reported that Real Salt Lake also received a fourth-round selection in the 2009 MLS SuperDraft as part of the trade.)	(United States) Brennan Tennelle	M	UC Santa Barbara
38	Chicago Fire (Note: #38: D.C. United → Chicago Fire. 2007-09-14: Chicago acquired this pick, originally a conditional selection, from D.C. United in exchange for forward Jerson Monteiro.)	(Jamaica) Dwight Barnett	F	Lynn University; Cape Cod Crusaders
39	Kansas City Wizards	(United States) Matt Marquess	D	Santa Clara; San Jose Frogs
40	Chicago Fire	(United States) Stephen King	M	Maryland
41	New England Revolution	(Canada) Matt Britner	D	Brown
42	Houston Dynamo	(United States) Geoff Cameron^†	M	Rhode Island; Rhode Island Stingrays

=== Round four ===
Pick #	MLS Team	Player	Position	Affiliation
43	Chivas USA (Note: #43: San Jose Earthquakes → Chivas USA. 2007-11-26: Chivas USA acquired this pick from San Jose in exchange for goalkeeper Preston Burpo. (Note: "Earthquakes acquire Burpo from Chivas USA". Seattle Post-Intelligencer. November 26, 2007.))	(United States) Keith Savage	M	West Florida; Central Florida Kraze
44	New York Red Bulls (Note: #44: Toronto FC → New York Red Bulls. 2007-01-25: New York acquired this pick from Toronto FC in exchange for forward Abbe Ibrahim.)	(United States) David Roth	M	Northwestern; Chicago Fire Premier
45	FC Dallas (Note: #45: Real Salt Lake → FC Dallas. 2007-01-12: FC Dallas acquired this pick from Real Salt Lake in exchange for the 48th pick in the 2007 MLS SuperDraft.)	(United States) Jamil Roberts	D	Santa Clara
46	Los Angeles Galaxy	(Guam) Brandon McDonald	M	San Francisco; San Jose Frogs
47	Colorado Rapids	(United States) Brian Grazier	M	Saint Louis
48	Columbus Crew	(United States) Steven Lenhart	F	Azusa Pacific; Southern California Seahorses
49	Colorado Rapids (Note: #49: New York Red Bulls → Colorado Rapids. 2007-03-30: Colorado acquired this pick and a conditional selection in the 2009 MLS SuperDraft from New York in exchange for forward Clint Mathis.)	(United States) Scott Campbell	M	North Carolina
50	FC Dallas	(United States) Ben Nason	M	Virginia Tech
51	Los Angeles Galaxy (Note: #51: Chivas USA → Real Salt Lake → New York Red Bulls → Los Angeles Galaxy. 2007-06-29: Los Angeles acquired this pick, originally a conditional selection, from New York in exchange for midfielder Santino Quaranta. New York had acquired this pick and a fourth-round selection in the 2009 MLS Supplemental Draft, which was canceled, from Real Salt Lake in exchange for goalkeeper Nick Rimando on 2007-02-23. It is likely, though not certain, that Real Salt Lake acquired this selection from Chivas USA in exchange for a first-round selection in the 2007 MLS Supplemental Draft. Chivas USA used the #2 pick in the 2007 Supplemental Draft, a pick RSL had acquired from Columbus, the pick's natural holders, on 2006-05-24. Confirmation of how Chivas USA acquired the 2007 Supplemental pick from Real Salt Lake is needed.)	(United States) Matt Hatzke	D	Santa Clara
52	D.C. United	(United States) Tony Schmitz	M	Creighton
53	Kansas City Wizards	(United States) Rauwshan McKenzie	D	Michigan State; Chicago Fire Premier
54	Chicago Fire	(United States) Austin Washington	D	Gonzaga; Spokane Spiders
55	New England Revolution	(United States) Spencer Wadsworth	F	Duke
56	Houston Dynamo	(United States) Jeremy Barlow	M	Virginia

=== Other draft day trades ===
- Los Angeles sent Chris Albright to New England for allocation money.
- Real Salt Lake sent Alecko Eskandarian to Chivas USA for allocation.

== See also ==
- Draft (sports)
- Generation Adidas
- Major League Soccer
- MLS SuperDraft
