= 2011 MLS Re-Entry Draft =

College draft for soccer teams

General information
- Dates: Stage 1: December 5, 2011; Stage 2: December 12, 2011

Overview
- League: Major League Soccer
- Teams: 19

The two-stage 2011 MLS Re-Entry Draft took place on December 5, 2011 (Stage 1) and December 12, 2011 (Stage 2). All 19 Major League Soccer clubs participated.

The Stage 1 and Stage 2 Drafts were conducted in the same order as the traditional Waiver Draft, with clubs choosing in reverse order of their 2011 Major League Soccer season finish. Expansion side Montreal Impact selected 19th.

Teams were able to select players who fell under the following circumstances:

- Players who were at least 23 years old, had a minimum of three years of MLS experience, and whose options were not exercised by their clubs (available at option salary for 2012).
- Players who were at least 25 years old, had a minimum of four years of MLS experience, were out of contract, and whose club did not offer them a contract at their previous salary (available at 2011 salary).
- Players who were at least 30 years old, had a minimum of eight years of MLS experience, were out of contract, and whose club did not wish to re-sign them (available for at least 105 percent of their 2011 salary).

Players who were not selected in the Stage 1 draft were made available for the Stage 2 draft. Clubs that selected players in Stage 2 must negotiate a new salary with any player not under contract.

Teams also had the option of passing on their selection.

== Available players ==
Players were required to meet age and service requirements to participate as stipulated by the terms of the MLS Collective Bargaining Agreement. The list below includes all players identified by the league on November 30, 2011 as eligible for the Re-Entry Draft. On December 2, 2011 the league released an updated list, removing players who were traded, re-signed, or retired. A handful of players who were not traded, re-signed, or retired were also removed from the list. These players are listed below as "Withdrew prior to draft", which was an option available to eligible players.

Player	Position	Released By	Contract Status	Re-Entry Draft Result
Jon Conway	GK	Chicago Fire	Option Declined	Selected in Stage 2 by Los Angeles Galaxy
Alec Dufty	GK	Chicago Fire	Option Declined	Not selected
Baggio Husidić	M	Chicago Fire	Option Declined	Selected in Stage 2 by Colorado Rapids
Andrew Boyens	D	Chivas USA	Option Declined	Selected in Stage 2 by Los Angeles Galaxy
Chukwudi Chijindu	M/F	Chivas USA	Option Declined	Not selected
Simon Elliott	M	Chivas USA	Out of Contract	Not selected
Ante Jazić	D	Chivas USA	Option Declined	Re-signed with Chivas USA prior to draft
Zach Thornton	GK	Chivas USA	Option Declined	Not selected
Mariano Trujillo	M	Chivas USA	Option Declined	Not selected
Michael Holody	D	Colorado Rapids	Option Declined	Not selected
Kevin Burns	M	Columbus Crew	Option Declined	Not selected
Jeff Cunningham	F	Columbus Crew	Option Declined	Not selected
Brandon Barklage	M	D.C. United	Option Declined	Not selected
Marc Burch	D	D.C. United	Option Declined	Selected in Stage 2 by Seattle Sounders FC
Steve Cronin	GK	D.C. United	Option Declined	Not selected
Devon McTavish	D	D.C. United	Option Declined	Not selected
Kurt Morsink	M	D.C. United	Option Declined	Withdrew prior to draft
Joseph Ngwenya	F	D.C. United	Option Declined	Not selected
Santino Quaranta	M	D.C. United	Option Declined	Retired prior to draft
Clyde Simms	M	D.C. United	Option Declined	Selected in Stage 2 by New England Revolution
Jed Zayner	D	D.C. United	Option Declined	Not selected
Maykel Galindo	F	FC Dallas	Option Declined	Not selected
Maicon Santos	F	FC Dallas	Option Declined	Not selected
Bobby Boswell	D	Houston Dynamo	Option Declined	Re-signed with Houston prior to draft
Hunter Freeman	D	Houston Dynamo	Option Declined	Selected in Stage 2 by Colorado Rapids
Jason Garey	F	Houston Dynamo	Option Declined	Not selected
Eddie Robinson	D	Houston Dynamo	Option Declined	Not selected
Adam Cristman	M	Los Angeles Galaxy	Option Declined	Withdrew prior to draft
Frankie Hejduk	D	Los Angeles Galaxy	Option Declined	Selected in Stage 2 by Los Angeles Galaxy
Dasan Robinson	D	Los Angeles Galaxy	Option Declined	Selected in Stage 2 by Los Angeles Galaxy
Chris Sharpe	GK	League Pool Goalkeeper	Option Declined	Withdrew prior to draft
Ryan Pore	M	Montreal Impact	Option Declined	Not selected
Greg Sutton	GK	Montreal Impact	Option Declined	Withdrew prior to draft; Re-signed with Montreal prior to Stage 2
Ryan Cochrane	D	New England Revolution	Option Declined	Not selected
Kheli Dube	F	New England Revolution	Option Declined	Selected in Stage 2 by Chicago Fire
Pat Phelan	M	New England Revolution	Option Declined	Not selected
Chris Albright	D	New York Red Bulls	Option Declined	Not selected
Bouna Coundoul	GK	New York Red Bulls	Option Declined	Not selected
Carlos Mendes	D	New York Red Bulls	Option Declined	Selected in Stage 1 by Columbus Crew
Chase Harrison	GK	Philadelphia Union	Option Declined	Not selected
Stefani Miglioranzi	M	Philadelphia Union	Option Declined	Not selected
Adin Brown	GK	Portland Timbers	Option Declined	Not selected
Rodrigo López	M	Portland Timbers	Option Declined	Not selected
Peter Lowry	M	Portland Timbers	Option Declined	Not selected
Jean Alexandre	M	Real Salt Lake	Option Declined	Traded to San Jose Earthquakes prior to draft
Arturo Alvarez	M/F	Real Salt Lake	Out of Contract	Selected in Stage 1 by Chivas USA
Nelson González	M/F	Real Salt Lake	Option Declined	Not selected
Rauwshan McKenzie	D	Real Salt Lake	Option Declined	Not selected
Blake Wagner	M	Real Salt Lake	Option Declined	Not selected
Andy Williams	M	Real Salt Lake	Out of Contract	Retired following Stage 1 of draft
Bobby Convey	D/M	San Jose Earthquakes	Option Declined	Traded to Sporting Kansas City prior to draft
Chris Leitch	D	San Jose Earthquakes	Option Declined	Selected in Stage 2 by Los Angeles Galaxy
André Luiz	M	San Jose Earthquakes	Option Declined	Not selected
Jacob Peterson	M	San Jose Earthquakes	Option Declined	Not selected
Scott Sealy	F	San Jose Earthquakes	Option Declined	Not selected
Andrew Weber	GK	San Jose Earthquakes	Option Declined	Not selected
Terry Boss	GK	Seattle Sounders FC	Option Declined	Retired prior to draft
Taylor Graham	D	Seattle Sounders FC	Option Declined	Retired prior to draft
Nate Jaqua	F	Seattle Sounders FC	Option Declined	Selected in Stage 2 by New England Revolution
Pat Noonan	F	Seattle Sounders FC	Option Declined	Selected in Stage 2 by Los Angeles Galaxy
Luke Sassano	M	Sporting Kansas City	Option Declined	Withdrew prior to draft
Shavar Thomas	D	Sporting Kansas City	Option Declined	Not selected
Danleigh Borman	D	Toronto FC	Out of Contract	Selected in Stage 1 by New England Revolution
Joe Cannon	GK	Vancouver Whitecaps FC	Option Declined	Re-signed with Vancouver prior to draft
Greg Janicki	D	Vancouver Whitecaps FC	Option Declined	Not selected
Jonathan Leathers	D	Vancouver Whitecaps FC	Out of Contract	Not selected
Jay Nolly	GK	Vancouver Whitecaps FC	Option Declined	Traded to Chicago Fire prior to draft
John Thorrington	M	Vancouver Whitecaps FC	Option Declined	Re-signed with Vancouver prior to draft
Peter Vagenas	M	Vancouver Whitecaps FC	Option Declined	Not selected

== Stage One ==
The first stage of the 2011 MLS Re-Entry Draft took place on December 5, 2011. All 19 Major League Soccer clubs participated.

=== Round 1 ===
Pick #	Drafting Team	Player	Position	Former Team
1	Vancouver Whitecaps FC	PASS		
2	New England Revolution	Danleigh Borman	D	Toronto FC
3	Toronto FC	PASS		
4	Chivas USA	Arturo Alvarez	M	Real Salt Lake
5	San Jose Earthquakes	PASS		
6	D.C. United	PASS		
7	Portland Timbers	PASS		
8	Chicago Fire	PASS		
9	Columbus Crew	Carlos Mendes	D	New York Red Bulls
10	FC Dallas	PASS		
11	New York Red Bulls	PASS		
12	Philadelphia Union	PASS		
13	Colorado Rapids	PASS		
14	Seattle Sounders FC	PASS		
15	Sporting Kansas City	PASS		
16	Real Salt Lake	PASS		
17	Houston Dynamo	PASS		
18	Los Angeles Galaxy	PASS		
19	Montreal Impact	PASS		

=== Round 2 ===
Pick #	Drafting Team	Player	Position	Former Team
20	New England Revolution	PASS		
21	Chivas USA	PASS		
22	Columbus Crew	PASS		

== Stage Two ==
The second stage of the 2011 MLS Re-Entry Draft took place on December 12, 2011. All 19 Major League Soccer clubs participated.

=== Round 1 ===
Pick #	Drafting Team	Player	Position	Former Team
1	Seattle Sounders FC (Note: #1: Vancouver Whitecaps FC → Seattle Sounders FC. 12 December 2011: Seattle Sounders FC acquired the #1 selection in Stage 2 of the 2011 MLS Re-Entry Draft from Vancouver Whitecaps FC in exchange for a third-round selection in the 2014 MLS SuperDraft and the #14 selection in Stage 2 of the 2011 MLS Re-Entry Draft. The traded SuperDraft pick is Seattle's natural selection.)	Marc Burch	D	D.C. United
2	New England Revolution	Nate Jaqua	F	Seattle Sounders FC
3	Toronto FC	PASS		
4	Chivas USA	PASS		
5	San Jose Earthquakes	PASS		
6	D.C. United	PASS		
7	Portland Timbers	PASS		
8	Chicago Fire	Kheli Dube	F	New England Revolution
9	Columbus Crew	PASS		
10	FC Dallas	PASS		
11	New York Red Bulls	PASS		
12	Philadelphia Union	PASS		
13	Colorado Rapids	Baggio Husidić	M	Chicago Fire
14	Vancouver Whitecaps FC (Note: #14: Seattle Sounders FC → Vancouver Whitecaps FC. 12 December 2011: Vancouver Whitecaps FC acquired the #14 selection in Stage 2 of the 2011 MLS Re-Entry Draft and a third-round selection in the 2014 MLS SuperDraft from Seattle Sounders FC in exchange for the #1 selection in Stage 2 of the 2011 MLS Re-Entry Draft. The traded SuperDraft pick is Seattle's natural selection.)	PASS		
15	Sporting Kansas City	PASS		
16	Real Salt Lake	PASS		
17	Houston Dynamo	PASS		
18	Los Angeles Galaxy	Andrew Boyens	D	Chivas USA
19	Montreal Impact	PASS		

=== Round 2 ===
Pick #	Drafting Team	Player	Position	Former Team
1	Seattle Sounders FC^{1}	PASS		
2	New England Revolution	Clyde Simms	M	D.C. United
3	Chicago Fire	PASS		
4	Colorado Rapids	Hunter Freeman	D	Houston Dynamo
5	Los Angeles Galaxy	Chris Leitch	D	San Jose Earthquakes

=== Round 3 ===
Pick #	Drafting Team	Player	Position	Former Team
1	New England Revolution	PASS		
2	Colorado Rapids	PASS		
3	Los Angeles Galaxy	Pat Noonan	F	Seattle Sounders FC

=== Round 4 ===
Pick #	Drafting Team	Player	Position	Former Team
1	Los Angeles Galaxy	Jon Conway	GK	Chicago Fire

=== Round 5 ===
Pick #	Drafting Team	Player	Position	Former Team
1	Los Angeles Galaxy	PASS		

After all clubs had passed on the remaining players, clubs were then allowed to draft their own former players. Los Angeles Galaxy selected defenders Frankie Hejduk and Dasan Robinson. No other club selected any of their own eligible players.
