= Kevin Burns (soccer) =

American soccer player

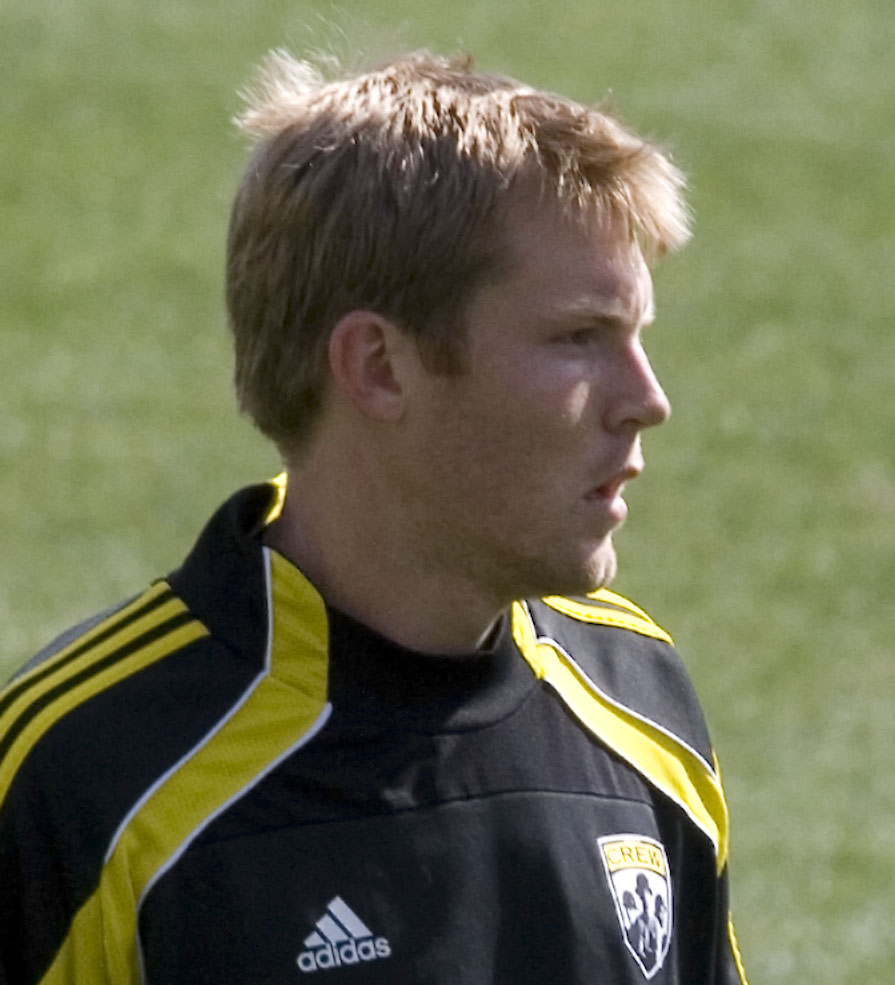

Personal information
- Date of birth: March 22, 1985 (age 41)
- Place of birth: Indianapolis, Indiana, United States
- Position: Midfielder

Youth career
- 2003–2006: Connecticut Huskies

Senior career*
| Years | Team | Apps | (Gls) |
| 2003–2004 | Bradenton Academics | 16 | (2) |
| 2006 | Westchester Flames | 2 | (0) |
| 2007 | Rochester Raging Rhinos | 17 | (0) |
| 2008–2011 | Columbus Crew | 38 | (0) |
| 2013 | Carolina RailHawks | 0 | (0) |
- * Club domestic league appearances and goals

Kevin Burns (born March 22, 1985) is an American retired professional soccer player.

== Career ==
=== College and amateur ===
Burns played college soccer at the University of Connecticut from 2003 to 2006. During the 2003 and 2004 collegiate off seasons, he played for the Bradenton Academics in the fourth division USL Premier Development League; in 2006, he played for the Westchester Flames.

=== Professional ===
Burns was drafted in the fourth round (50th overall) by Columbus Crew in the 2007 MLS Supplemental Draft., but instead of signing with Columbus he spent the 2007 season with the Rochester Raging Rhinos in the USL First Division. Burns eventually signed with Columbus for the 2008 season, but sat out the season with an ankle injury.

After the 2008 dissolution of the reserve league, Burns was initially waived but was re-signed just prior to the beginning of the 2009 season. To make room, Columbus cut goalkeeper Kenny Schoeni.

Burns made his MLS debut on May 27, 2009, as 69th-minute substitute for Brian Carroll in a game against the San Jose Earthquakes.

Burns remained with Columbus through the 2011 season. At season's end, the club declined his 2012 contract option and he entered the 2011 MLS Re-Entry Draft. Burns was not selected in the draft and became a free agent.
