= Ricardo Pierre-Louis =

Haitian footballer (born 1984)

Personal information
- Full name: Ricardo Pierre-Louis
- Date of birth: November 2, 1984 (age 41)
- Place of birth: Léogâne, Haiti
- Height: 6 ft 1 in (1.85 m)
- Position: Forward

Team information
- Current team: Magic Soccer Academy Verrettes 3rd Division Haitian league
- Number: 10

Youth career
- 2005–2007: Lee Flames

Senior career*
| Years | Team | Apps | (Gls) |
| 2007 | Cape Cod Crusaders | 7 | (6) |
| 2008 | Columbus Crew | 0 | (0) |
| 2009 | Cleveland City Stars | 26 | (3) |

International career^{‡}
| | Haiti U-17 | 45 | (28) |
| | Haiti U-20 | 14 | (5) |
| | Haiti U-23 | 19 | (7) |
| 2004–2009 | Haiti | 44 | (7) |
- * Club domestic league appearances and goals as of 22 October 2009 ‡ National team caps and goals as of 29 May 2009

Ricardo Pierre-Louis (born November 2, 1984) is a Haitian soccer player, currently playing for Magic Soccer Academy Verrettes in 3rd division in Haiti. He is also the club owner.

== Career ==
=== College and amateur ===
Pierre-Louis played college soccer at Lee University, where he was a three-time all-Southern States Athletic Conference selection in 2005, 2006 and 2007, the SSAC Newcomer of the Year in 2005, a two-time NAIA Region XIII Player of the Year in 2006 and 2007, a two-time NAIA first team all-American in 2006 and 2007, a NAIA Player of the Year in 2007, and Lee University's Athlete of the Year in 2005, 2006 and 2007 .

In 2007, he also played for the Cape Cod Crusaders in the USL Premier Development League.

=== Professional ===
He was at Cavaly as Club Leogane Haiti and scored 34 goals, in 54 games with Cavaly. Pierre-Louis was drafted in the second round (22nd overall) in the 2008 MLS SuperDraft by the Columbus Crew of Major League Soccer. He was part of the team that won the supporter shields and the MLS Cup that year, but never played during the season. Pierre-Louis was waived by the crew and signed with the Cleveland City stars soon after.

He signed but never played with the Cleveland City Stars of the USL First Division on March 17, 2009.

=== Coaching career ===
Pierre-Louis begun his coaching career soon after early retirement from pro soccer. Pierre-Louis started Magic Soccer F.C, a successful youth soccer club in Bismarck, ND. Pierre-Louis is a USFF “B” licensed coach. magic soccerskills.com

=== International ===
Pierre-Louis won Caribbean championships with the Haitian national U-17 and U-20 teams, was captain of the Haitian national U-20 team, and was a member of the senior Haiti squad which took part in the 2007 CONCACAF Gold Cup.

=== International goals ===
Scores and results list Haiti's goal tally first.

| No | Date | Venue | Opponent | Score | Result | Competition |
|---|---|---|---|---|---|---|
| 1. | 30 May 2007 | Hasely Crawford Stadium, Port of Spain, Trinidad and Tobago | Saint Vincent and the Grenadines | 3–0 | 3–0 | 2007 Digicel Shield |
