= Andrew Peterson (soccer) =

American soccer player

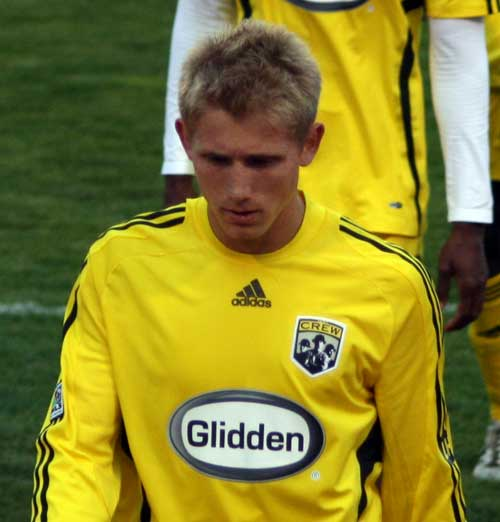

Personal information
- Full name: Andrew Peterson
- Date of birth: December 2, 1984 (age 41)
- Place of birth: Edina, Minnesota, U.S.
- Height: 5 ft 10 in (1.78 m)
- Position: Defender

Youth career
- 2003–2006: Creighton Bluejays

Senior career*
Years	Team	Apps	(Gls)
2007	Cleveland City Stars	0	(0)
2007–2009	Columbus Crew	2	(0)
2009	Minnesota Thunder	24	(0)
- * Club domestic league appearances and goals as of 22 October 2009

Andrew Peterson (born December 2, 1984) is an American former soccer player.

== Career ==
=== Youth and college ===
Peterson attended for Wayzata High School in Plymouth, Minnesota, from 1999 to 2003, where he was an All-Conference and All-State player his senior year. Peterson played four years of college soccer for Creighton University, starting over 80 games while claiming numerous all tournament awards, a 2nd Team All Midwest his junior year and 2nd Team All Conference in his senior year.

=== Professional ===
Peterson was drafted in the first round of the 2007 USL Draft by the Minnesota Thunder of the a USL First Division. However, instead of playing for Minnesota Thunder, Peterson decided to train as a Christian missionary with the Cleveland City Stars in the USL Second Division. Through the efforts of his Cleveland coach, Martin Rennie, and general manager Aaron Treadway, they arranged for him to play in a May reserve game for the Columbus Crew against the Chicago Fire in which the Columbus Crew team won 1–0. As a result of this tryout, the Crew asked offered Peterson a developmental contract in July 2007. His first game with the Crew was against the Colorado Rapids on July 4, 2007.

On March 4, 2009, the Minnesota Thunder announced the signing of Peterson for the 2009 season.
