= Ryan Miller (soccer) =

American soccer player (born 1984)

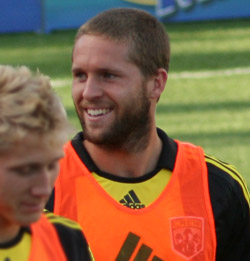
- Ryan Miller in 2008

Personal information
- Date of birth: December 14, 1984 (age 41)
- Place of birth: Barrington, Illinois, U.S.
- Height: 1.80 m (5 ft 11 in)
- Position: Defender

College career
Years	Team	Apps	(Gls)
2003–2007	Notre Dame Fighting Irish		

Senior career*
Years	Team	Apps	(Gls)
2003	Chicago Fire Reserves	2	(0)
2005	Nevada Wonders	2	(0)
2005–2007	Indiana Invaders	15	(1)
2008	Columbus Crew	0	(0)
2008	→ Cleveland City Stars (loan)	2	(0)
2008–2009	D.C. United	0	(0)
2009	Ljungskile SK	14	(0)
2010–2012	Halmstads BK	83	(0)
2013	Portland Timbers	7	(0)
- * Club domestic league appearances and goals

Ryan Miller (born December 14, 1984) is an American former professional soccer player and coach.

== Amateur career ==
Born in Barrington Illinois, Miller attended Barrington High School, where he graduated in 2003 and finished his prep career with 100 points, on 36 goals and 28 assists. He attended University of Notre Dame and as a fifth year senior in 2007, he was a Second Team NSCAA All-American and earned CoSIDA First Team Academic All-American honors. He finished his time with the Fighting Irish with 86 straight starts, the most in the team's history.

During his college years, Miller also played for Chicago Fire Reserves, Nevada Wonders and Indiana Invaders in the USL Premier Development League.

== Professional career ==
Miller was originally drafted by Columbus Crew in the third round (31st overall) of the 2008 MLS SuperDraft and made seven reserve team appearances for the club before being released. He was signed via waivers by D.C. United on September 15, 2008, and made his D.C. debut on October 1, 2008, in a CONCACAF Champions League match against Primera Division de Mexico side Cruz Azul. Miller made a total of three appearances for United, including two starts, all coming in the CONCACAF Champions League. One week into the 2009 MLS season, Miller was waived by D.C. United.

After his release by D.C., Miller went on trial with several clubs in Europe, eventually signing with Swedish Superettan side Ljungskile SK. After a short but successful stint with the club, Miller moved up a division to the Allsvenskan league with fellow Swedish club Halmstads BK, where he had trialled the previous spring. He stayed with Halmstads for three seasons and helped the club gain promotion to the Swedish top flight.

On January 21, 2013, Miller signed with Portland Timbers of Major League Soccer. He was not retained following the season.

=== International ===
On December 21, 2010, Miller was called up to the United States men's national soccer team squad by head coach Bob Bradley for a friendly against Chile, but he didn't feature in the match.
