= Cory Elenio =

American soccer player

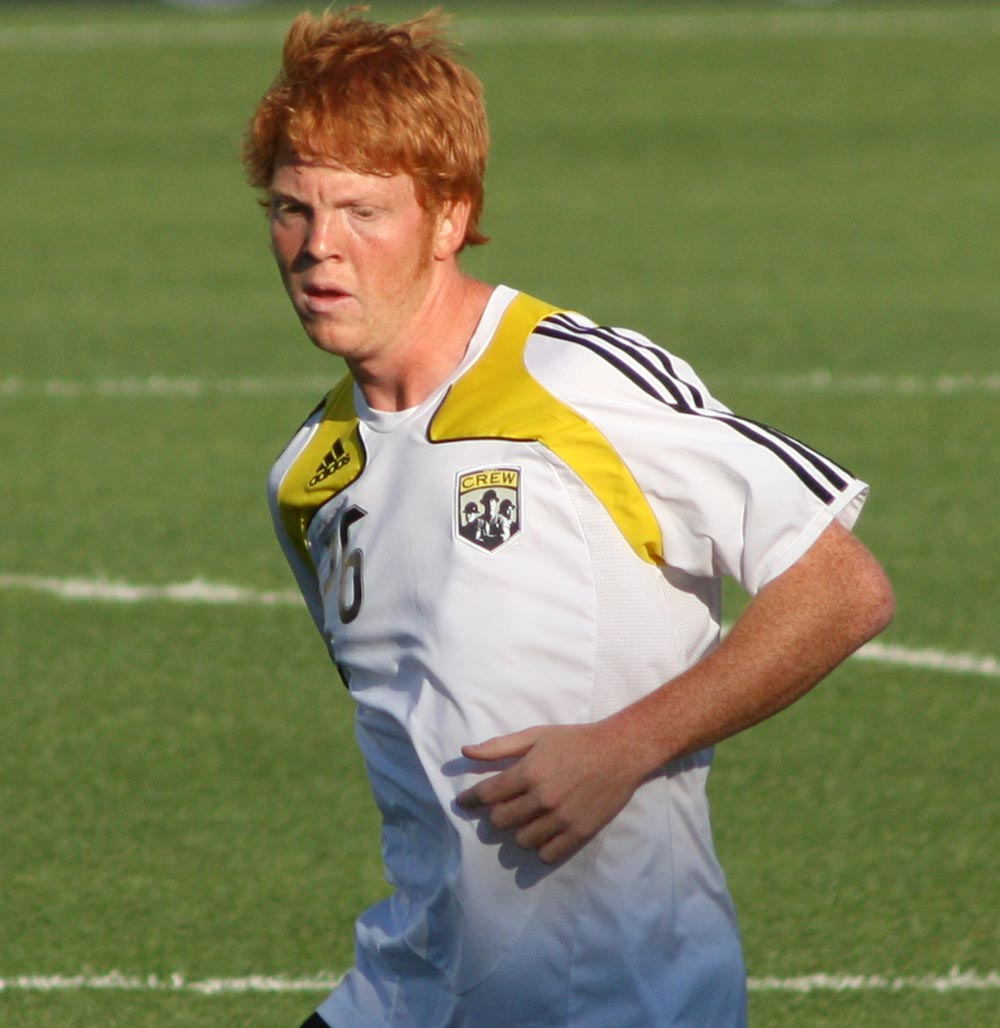

Personal information
- Full name: Cory Michael Elenio
- Date of birth: August 14, 1986 (age 40)
- Place of birth: Ann Arbor, Michigan, United States
- Height: 6 ft 1 in (1.85 m)
- Position: Midfielder

College career
| Years | Team | Apps | (Gls) |
| 2004–2007 | Evansville Purple Aces | | |

Senior career*
| Years | Team | Apps | (Gls) |
| 2005 | Fort Wayne Fever | 11 | (0) |
| 2008–2009 | Columbus Crew | 2 | (0) |
| 2010–2012 | Carolina RailHawks | 64 | (1) |
| 2011–2012 | Syracuse Silver Knights (indoor) | 23 | (16) |
| 2013 | Wilmington Hammerheads | 12 | (0) |
| 2013–2016 | Syracuse Silver Knights (indoor) | 41 | (24) |
- * Club domestic league appearances and goals as of May 12, 2020

Cory Elenio (born August 14, 1986) is an American soccer player.

== Career ==
=== College and amateur ===
Elenio was born in Ann Arbor, Michigan. He attended the University of Evansville and tallied 18 goals and 19 assists in four years, becoming the 18th leading scorer in school history. Elenio was named to the NSCAA All-Midwest Region team and the All-Missouri Valley Conference first team in both 2006 and 2007. In 2005, Elenio also played for Fort Wayne Fever in the Premier Development League.

=== Professional ===
Elenio was Columbus Crew's second-round selection (20th overall) in the 2008 MLS Supplemental Draft. He trained with Columbus during the preseason and appeared in the club's MLS Reserve Division matches at D.C. United and Toronto FC before playing his first minutes as a professional on June 14, 2008, against Kansas City Wizards. He was cut by Columbus on March 23, 2010. Shortly thereafter Elenio signed with Carolina RailHawks.
