= Frankie Hejduk =

American soccer player

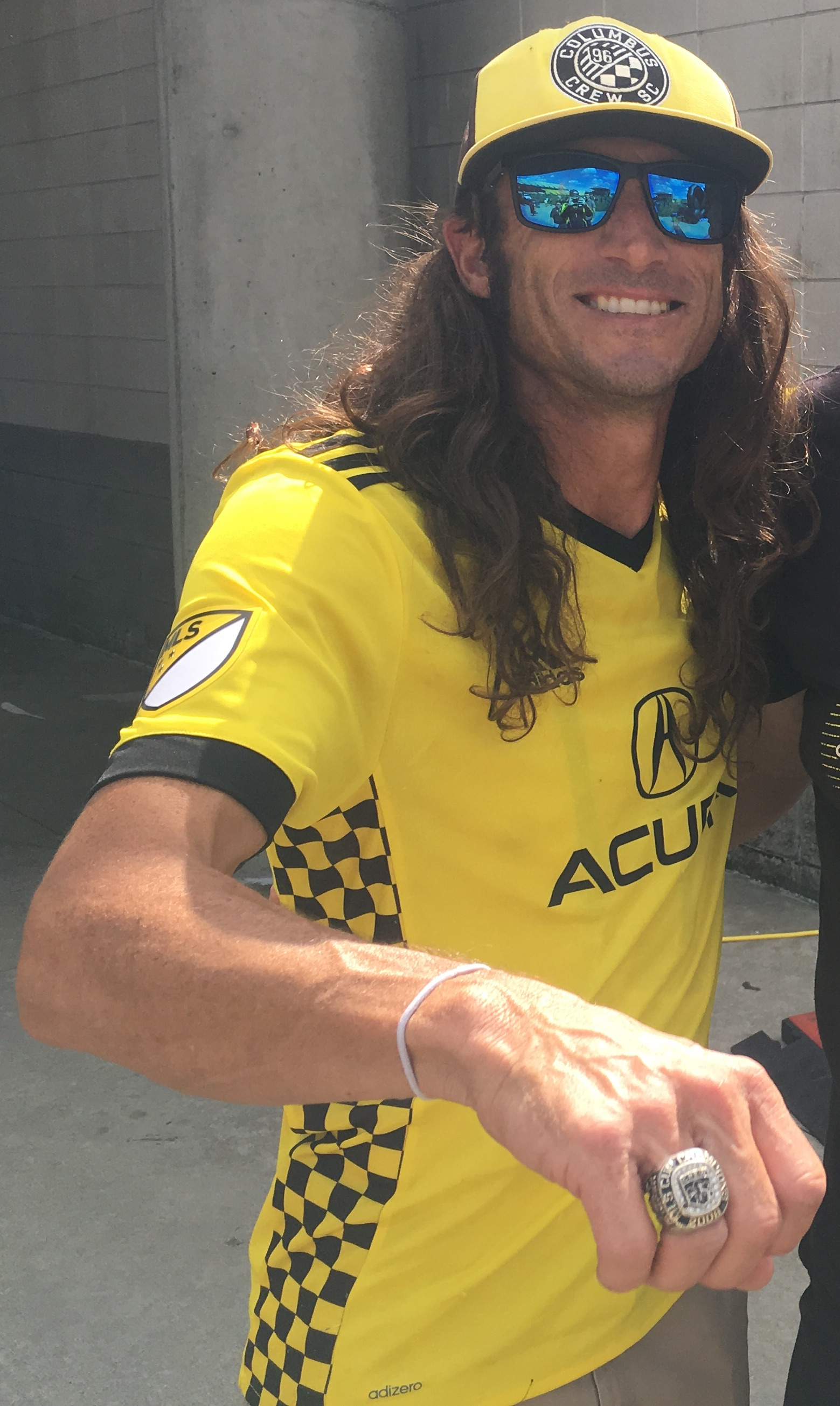
- Hejduk in 2017

Personal information
- Full name: Frank Daniel Hejduk
- Date of birth: August 5, 1974 (age 52)
- Place of birth: La Mesa, California, United States
- Height: 5 ft 7 in (1.70 m)
- Positions: Wingback; midfielder

Youth career
- –1991: San Dieguito Mustangs
- –1991: La Jolla Nomads

College career
Years	Team	Apps	(Gls)
1992–1994	UCLA Bruins		

Senior career*
Years	Team	Apps	(Gls)
1996–1998	Tampa Bay Mutiny	57	(5)
1999–2003	Bayer Leverkusen	19	(1)
1999–2003	Bayer Leverkusen II	26	(0)
2002	→ St. Gallen (loan)	7	(0)
2003–2010	Columbus Crew	147	(7)
2011	Los Angeles Galaxy	6	(0)
Total		262	(13)

International career
1996	United States U23	3	(0)
2000	United States Olympic (O.P.)	6	(0)
1996–2009	United States	85	(7)
Medal record
Representing United States
Winner	CONCACAF Gold Cup	2002
Winner	CONCACAF Gold Cup	2005
Winner	CONCACAF Gold Cup	2007
Runner-up	CONCACAF Gold Cup	1998
Third place	CONCACAF Gold Cup	1996
Third place	CONCACAF Gold Cup	2003
Men's Soccer
- * Club domestic league appearances and goals

Frank Daniel "Frankie" Hejduk (born August 5, 1974) is an American former soccer player who played as a wingback and midfielder. At the club level he represented the Tampa Bay Mutiny, Bayer Leverkusen, St. Gallen, Columbus Crew, and the LA Galaxy. A full international between 1996 and 2009, he won 85 caps for the United States national team and represented his nation at the 1998 and 2002 FIFA World Cups. He also represented the United States at the 1996 and 2000 Summer Olympics.

Hejduk serves as the manager of team strategic partnerships within the Crew front office.

== Early life ==
Hejduk attended San Dieguito High School where he played on the boys' soccer team. He was also a member of the powerhouse La Jolla Nomads Soccer Club which won the California state youth championship in 1989, 1990 and 1991. After high school, Hejduk attended UCLA. He spent three seasons, 1992 to 1994, as a defender on the UCLA Bruins soccer team. While a defender, he was the second leading scorer in 1994 with six goals. He was also named an NCAA second-team All-American his junior year.

== Club career ==
=== MLS ===
In February 1996, Tampa Bay Mutiny drafted Hejduk in the seventh round (67th overall) of the 1996 MLS Inaugural Player Draft. Hejduk played in the league's first three seasons. However, commitments to the Olympic team limited him to only eight games as a rookie. In 1997, Hejduk established himself on the Mutiny defense, playing 22 games and registering one goal and six assists. He did much of the same in 1998, registering three goals and one assist with the team over 18 games while missing significant time while playing in the 1998 FIFA World Cup.

=== Europe ===
Hejduk's performance in the World Cup inspired German First Division side Bayer Leverkusen to purchase his contract from MLS on July 13, 1998. He remained with the Mutiny through the end of the 1998 season then joined Leverkusen in January 1999. After initially struggling at Leverkusen, Hejduk came on strong at the end of the 1998–99 season when the club experienced several critical injuries. He started ten of the last eleven games, helping the team earn a place in the UEFA Champions League. At the beginning of the 1999–2000 season, Leverkusen manager Christoph Daum changed Leverkusen's tactical formation which took Hejduk out of the starting line up. Although Hejduk only appeared in six Bundesliga games for the team in 1999–2000, he played a significant role for the club in their Champions League campaign, appearing in five of Leverkusen's six games and twice being named as Man of the Match. Hejduk's role at Leverkusen continued to dwindle in 2000–01 as he only appeared in three league games for the team and a single Champions League match, spending most of his time with their third division affiliate. In the 2001–02 season, Hejduk's role was even further diminished, as a shoulder injury kept him out of early season action, and he did not receive any playing time following his recovery. It became so bad, that Daum's replacement as manager Klaus Toppmöller stated that Hejduk had no future with Leverkusen. Leverkusen eventually sold Hejduk's contract to Swiss club FC St. Gallen, during the 2001–02 season. Hejduk then signed for an additional year at Gallen but made only seven appearances with the first team, losing his spot as the season progressed with his last appearance being in a record 11-3 defeat to FC Wil in November 2002.

=== Return to MLS ===
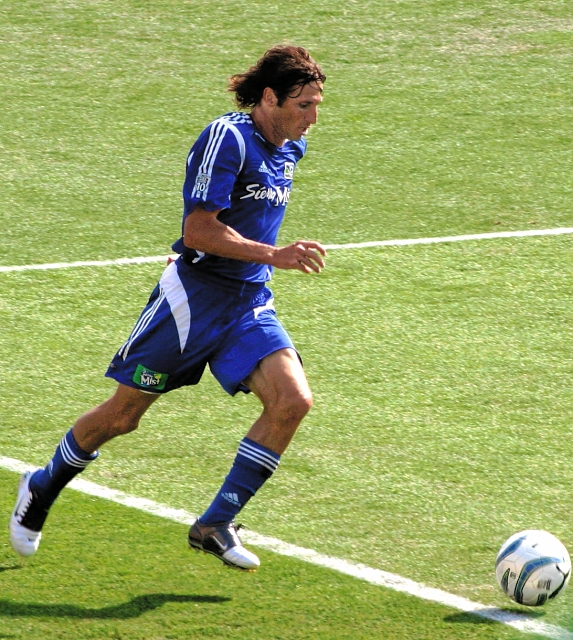
Hejduk in 2005

Unable to find playing time in Europe, Hejduk returned to the United States and Major League Soccer for the 2003 season, where he was allocated to the Columbus Crew. Hejduk immediately found a spot as team leader right back for the Crew, and went on to start 23 games for the team that season, assisting on four goals. He played a similar role at right back and right midfield in 2004, starting 19 games and scoring two goals for a club that won the MLS Supporters Shield. On January 25, 2007, the Columbus Crew announced that they had signed Hejduk to a two-year contract extension, keeping him with the Crew through the 2008 MLS season. On November 23, 2008, Hejduk headed home a pass from Guillermo Barros Schelotto to provide the final goal in a 3–1 victory securing the Crew's first MLS Cup.

After the 2010 MLS season Columbus declined Hejduk's contract option and Hejduk elected to participate in the 2010 MLS Re-Entry Draft. On December 15, 2010, Hejduk was selected by Sporting Kansas City in Stage 2 of the Re-Entry draft, and subsequently traded to the Los Angeles Galaxy later the same day. He played six first-team games and another five games with the Galaxy reserve team. At season's end, Los Angeles declined his 2012 contract option and Hejduk entered the 2011 MLS Re-Entry Draft. After no other club selected him, Los Angeles exercised its option to retain his MLS rights. However, on January 30, 2012, the club announced that it was unable to come to terms with Hejduk and that he would not play for the Galaxy in 2012.

Rather than having microfracture surgery on his ankle and additional surgery to repair a broken wrist, Hejduk officially announced his retirement from professional soccer on April 19, 2012, opting to accept a position in the Crew front office.

== International career ==
Hejduk was a frequent starter for the U.S. Men's National Team, and is the only individual to have represented the U.S. in the 1996 and 2000 Summer Olympic Games and the 1998 and 2002 FIFA World Cup Finals tournaments.

In 1990, Hejduk spent time on the U.S. U-17 national team, but was not selected for 1991 U-17 World Cup. Upon leaving UCLA, Hejduk trained full-time with the U.S. U-23 as it prepared for the upcoming 1996 Summer Olympics. This time, Hejduk made the U.S. Olympic roster, playing all three games as the U.S. went 1–1–1 and failed to make the second round. Following the Olympics, Hejduk joined his professional club and made his debut with the senior U.S. national team.

Hejduk received his first cap for the United States August 30, 1996, against El Salvador. In his first start in December of the same year, he scored a goal against Guatemala in a World Cup Qualifier. Hejduk became a regular on the U.S. team but became known for his lackadaisical "surfer" approach to his game. This attitude persisted until he missed a team flight to China on January 23, 1997, having spent the night with friends and overslept. U.S. coach Steve Sampson dropped Hejduk from the U.S. roster. Over the next year, Hejduk saw precisely six minutes on the field with the U.S., in an August 7, 1997, loss to Ecuador. During that year, he married his longtime girlfriend, Kim Walters, and after considerable thought decided to commit himself to a professional soccer career.

Beginning with a February 1, 1998, victory over Cuba in the 1998 Gold Cup, Hejduk again became a regular with the national team. Since then he has remained a mainstay. Following the Gold Cup, Hejduk was named to the U.S. roster for the World Cup, where he started two of the United States' three matches. Although Hejduk's role with the United States waned during his years with Leverkusen, he seized an opportunity to regain his starting role at the 2002 Gold Cup when he took over the left back position vacated by David Regis. Hejduk held onto it to play an important role for the United States in the 2002 World Cup, starting four games from a left back position. On May 2, 2006, Hejduk was named to his third successive U.S. World Cup roster for the tournament in Germany, but was replaced after suffering a torn ACL.

In 2007, he returned to the USMNT roster after playing for the Crew in the spring, and started his first game for the U.S. in June's 2007 CONCACAF Gold Cup tournament. In that tourney's semifinal vs. Canada (June 21), Frankie made the first goal of the match in a U.S.'s 2–1 win, a spectacular long shot that earned him the match's "Play of the Game" honor from Fox Soccer Channel. He started the first qualifier for the 2010 World Cup held in his home stadium, Columbus Crew Stadium on February 11, 2009, a 2–0 victory against Mexico. After the game, Hejduk was involved in an altercation with Mexican assistant coach Francisco "Paco" Javier Ramírez, who slapped Hejduk in the tunnels as both teams headed to the locker room. Hejduk did not retaliate, and Ramirez was not reprimanded nor apologized. On March 28, 2009, Hejduk was influential in both U.S. goals in the final 15 minutes to earn the U.S. a 2–2 draw at El Salvador. His header in the 87th minute earned the U.S. a crucial point.

Frankie Hejduk was not named to the U.S. National Team's preliminary 2010 FIFA World Cup roster, when it was released on May 11, 2010.

=== International goals ===
Scores and results list the United States' goal tally first, score column indicates score after each Hejduk goal.

List of international goals scored by Frankie Hejduk
No.	Date	Venue	Opponent	Score	Result	Competition
1	December 21, 1996	San Salvador, El Salvador	Guatemala	2–2	2–2	1998 FIFA World Cup Qualifying
2	April 28, 1998	Vienna, Austria	Austria	1–0	3–0	Friendly
3	March 11, 1999	Los Angeles, California, United States	Guatemala	3–1	3–1	1999 Nike U.S. Cup
4	March 13, 1999	San Diego, California, United States	Mexico	1–1	1–2	1999 Nike U.S. Cup
5	June 11, 2000	East Rutherford, New Jersey, United States	Mexico	2–0	3–0	2000 Nike U.S. Cup
6	June 9, 2007	Chicago, Illinois, United States	Canada	1–0	2–1	2007 CONCACAF Gold Cup
7	March 28, 2009	San Salvador, El Salvador	El Salvador	2–2	2–2	2010 FIFA World Cup Qualifying

== Post-playing career ==
On April 19, 2012, Hejduk rejoined the Crew organization, agreeing to terms to become the club's "Brand Ambassador", a job focused on community outreach and marketing of the team. As of 2023, Hejduk's official position within the Crew's Front Office was Manager of Team Strategic Partnerships.

== Personal life ==
Frankie's Croatian surname, "Hejduk", is a derivation of the term Hajduk. He has been married to Elissa Zurcher since 2005 and has four children; three sons, Frankie Nesta (born February 25, 1998), Coasten Daniel (born January 2, 2008) and Hendrix (born 2015) and one daughter, Kali (born 2010). His favorite soccer team is Boca Juniors and his favorite player was Claudio Caniggia. He is also a fan of the Los Angeles Chargers. Hejduk is a huge fan of Jamaican reggae legend Bob Marley and celebrates his goals by replicating the hypnotic dances Marley did during his performances.

Hejduk gained some small notoriety in October 2008 after he showed up at a Crew supporters tailgate for a game against the LA Galaxy while serving a one-game suspension. With his duty on the U.S. Soccer team, he became one of first former Yugoslav soccer players to play for the United States, following with Serbian American Preki.

Hejduk is an avid surfer and was a member of San Dieguito High School's state and national championship surfing team. He was a 1988 National Junior High School Surfing Champion and qualified for the 1989 U.S. Amateur Surfing Team by finishing tenth overall.

== Honors ==
Tampa Bay Mutiny

- Major League Soccer Supporters' Shield: 1996

Bayer Leverkusen

- Bundesliga runner-up: 1998–99, 1999–2000, 2001–02
- DFB-Pokal runner-up: 2001–02
- UEFA Champions League runner-up: 2001–02

Columbus Crew

- MLS Cup: 2008
- Major League Soccer Supporters' Shield: 2004, 2008, 2009
- Major League Soccer Eastern Conference Championship: 2008
- U.S. Open Cup runner-up: 2010

Los Angeles Galaxy

- MLS Cup: 2011
- Major League Soccer Supporters' Shield: 2011
- Major League Soccer Western Conference Championship: 2011

United States

- CONCACAF Gold Cup: 2002, 2005, 2007

Individual

- MLS All-Star: 1998
- CONCACAF Gold Cup All-Tournament team: 2007

Sporting positions
Preceded by Robin Fraser	Columbus Crew captain 2006–2010	Succeeded by Chad Marshall
