= Guilherme Só =

Brazilian footballer (born 1986)

Personal information
- Full name: Guilherme Só
- Date of birth: April 22, 1986 (age 40)
- Place of birth: Porto Alegre, Brazil
- Height: 1.83 m (6 ft 0 in)
- Position: Forward

Youth career
- 1997–2005: Internacional

Senior career*
Years	Team	Apps	(Gls)
2006	Grêmio		
2007	Brasil de Pelotas		
2008	Columbus Crew	0	(0)
- * Club domestic league appearances and goals

Guilherme Só (pronounced SAH) (born April 22, 1986, in Porto Alegre) is a Brazilian football player.

== Career ==
Só began his career in the youth system of his hometown club Internacional. There, he spent 8 years before making the move to Inter's cross-city rivals Grêmio. Following a year there, he moved to G.E. Brasil.

On March 28, 2008, North American club Columbus Crew announced that they had signed Só, via discovery. Prior to being signed, Só had been training with Columbus since February participating in their preseason where he registered a goal and an assist. However, Só was released not long after the start of the 2008 season.
