= George Josten =

American soccer player (born 1986)

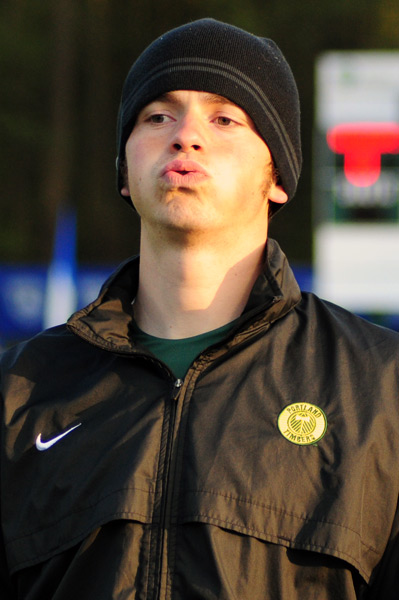

Personal information
- Date of birth: May 12, 1986 (age 40)
- Place of birth: Idaho Falls, Idaho, U.S.
- Height: 6 ft 0 in (1.83 m)
- Positions: Midfielder; forward

Youth career
- 2004–2007: Gonzaga Bulldogs

Senior career*
Years	Team	Apps	(Gls)
2007	Michigan Bucks	7	(0)
2008	Columbus Crew	0	(0)
2008	→ Cleveland City Stars (loan)	1	(0)
2009–2010	Portland Timbers	43	(6)
- * Club domestic league appearances and goals as of October 20, 2010

George Josten (born May 12, 1986) is an American retired soccer player who last played for Portland Timbers in the USSF Division-2 Professional League.

== Career ==
=== College and amateur ===
Josten attended Idaho Falls High School and played college soccer at Gonzaga University, where he scored 34 goals in 79 career games over four years. He finished his collegiate career ranked third all-time in school history in goals and assists and fourth in points, was named to the All-West Coast Conference first team for three consecutive seasons between 2005 and 2007, and was also named in the NSCAA All-Far West Region first team in 2006 and 2007.

During his college years Josten also played with Michigan Bucks in the USL Premier Development League, helping them to the PDL Championship Game in 2007.

=== Professional ===
Josten was selected in the second Round (20th overall) of the 2008 MLS SuperDraft by the Columbus Crew. He made his full professional debut for Columbus on May 27, 2008, coming on as a substitute for Alejandro Moreno in a US Open Cup game against Real Salt Lake.

After spending time on loan with the Cleveland City Stars in the USL Second Division, and despite recording one goal and two assists in eleven MLS Reserve Division matches, Josten was released by Columbus at the end of the 2008 season, having never played a single minute of MLS league soccer.

He signed for Portland Timbers of the USL First Division on February 20, 2009.

== Honors ==
=== Portland Timbers ===
- USL First Division Commissioner's Cup (1): 2009
