= Jed Zayner =

American soccer player

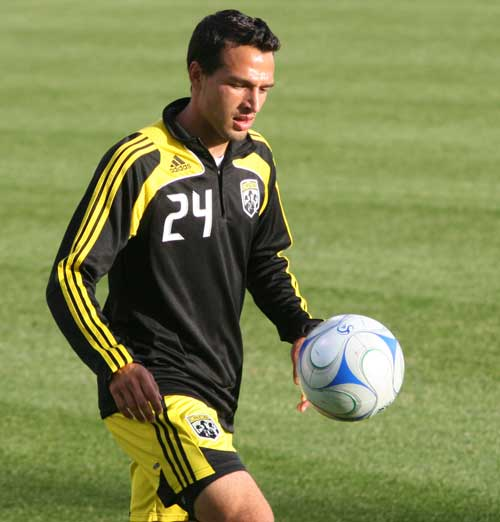

Personal information
- Full name: Jedidiah Zayner
- Date of birth: December 13, 1984 (age 41)
- Place of birth: Valparaiso, Indiana, United States
- Height: 5 ft 11 in (1.80 m)
- Position: Defender

Youth career
- 2003–2005: Indiana Hoosiers

Senior career*
Years	Team	Apps	(Gls)
2003–2005	Chicago Fire Premier	28	(2)
2006–2010	Columbus Crew	36	(0)
2008	→ Cleveland City Stars (loan)	2	(0)
2010–2011	D.C. United	13	(0)
2012	San Jose Earthquakes	1	(0)
Total		80	(2)
- * Club domestic league appearances and goals as of June 20, 2012

Jedidiah "Jed" Zayner (born December 13, 1984, in Valparaiso, Indiana) is an American former professional soccer player.

== Career ==
=== Youth and college ===
Zayner grew up in Orland Park, Illinois, attended Carl Sandburg High School where his team won back-to-back state championships, and he followed that with back-to-back NCAA national championships at Indiana University where he played college soccer from 2003 to 2005. In his three seasons there he started 65 games earning one goal and 4 assists. He also played for three seasons with Chicago Fire Premier in the USL Premier Development League.

=== Professional ===
Zayner was drafted in the second round, 13th overall, of the 2006 MLS SuperDraft by the Columbus Crew, but saw no first-team games during the 2006 season due to injury. He made his MLS debut for Crew on 20 June 2007, against Kansas City Wizards. During the 2008 season Zayner also spent a short time on loan with the Cleveland City Stars of the USL Second Division, making two appearances. On August 5, 2010, he was traded to D.C. United along with a fourth-round pick in the 2011 MLS SuperDraft in exchange for a second-round pick in the 2012 MLS SuperDraft.

He remained with D.C. United through the 2011 season. At season's end, the club declined his 2012 contract option and he entered the 2011 MLS Re-Entry Draft. Zayner was not selected in the draft and became a free agent.

Zayner signed with San Jose Earthquakes on 20 June 2012. On July 29, 2012, Zayner made his first appearance for the Earthquakes in a 1–1 draw with Chicago Fire.

At the end of the 2012 MLS season, Zayner announced he was retiring from playing professional soccer.

=== International ===
Zayner represented the U.S. at the Under-18 level, and was a member of the U-20 pool in 2003.

== Personal ==
Zayner serves as a celebrity spokesman for both the U.S. Soccer Foundation's Passback program and Lacelet, a fund-raising accessory that benefits the Juvenile Diabetes Research Foundation. He also began his own non-profit company called Filleo in 2007. The company sells T-shirts and raises money to provide clothing and education to youth in need.

Jed married his wife Katherine in 2008. They have three sons.

Zayner is a Christian. Zayner has spoken about his faith saying, "God gives us a purpose, and He gives us a hope—a hope that [even though] this life is so short, heaven is forever."

== Honors ==
=== Columbus Crew ===
- Major League Soccer MLS Cup (1): 2008
- Major League Soccer Supporters' Shield (3): 2008, 2009, 2012

=== Indiana University ===
- NCAA Men's Division I Soccer Championship (2): 2003, 2004
