= Nicolás Hernández (Argentine footballer) =

Argentine footballer (born 1979)

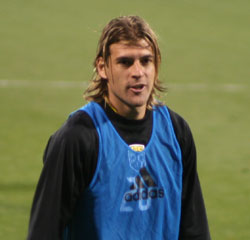
- Hernández in 2008

Personal information
- Date of birth: 4 May 1979 (age 47)
- Place of birth: Buenos Aires, Argentina
- Height: 5 ft 10 in (1.78 m)
- Position: Forward

Youth career
- Ferro Carril Oeste

Senior career*
Years	Team	Apps	(Gls)
1999–2000	Ferro Carril Oeste	17	(3)
2000–2001	Colón	10	(0)
2002	Cremonese		
2002–2003	San Martín (M)	21	(4)
2003–2005	Huracán	60	(18)
2005	Cobreloa	15	(3)
2006–2008	Colorado Rapids	54	(11)
2008	Columbus Crew	5	(0)
2009	Alajuelense	13	(1)
2010–2012	SHB Đà Nẵng	37	(10)
2012–2013	Quảng Nam		(5)
2013–2017	Ferro Carril Oeste	22	(1)
- * Club domestic league appearances and goals

Nicolás "Niko" Hernández (born 4 May 1979 in Buenos Aires, Argentina) is an Argentine retired footballer.

== Career ==
Hernández began his professional career with the Primera División side Ferro Carril Oeste in 1999. After a year with them he moved to Colón de Santa Fe for a season. In 2002, he was signed by Italian club U.S. Cremonese. After a short spell with them he ended up back in Argentina playing for National B Division teams San Martín de Mendoza and Huracán until 2005 when he was picked up by Chilean powerhouse Cobreloa.

On 30 March 2006, he was signed by the Colorado Rapids. He started his first game with the club on 2 April against the Columbus Crew and scored 8 goals for the club. He was traded to the Columbus Crew on 27 February 2008 for Tim Ward. He was waived on 27 June 2008.

Niko moved to Costa Rica for play with the Liga Deportiva Alajuelense during one-year contract. He was the only non-Costa Rican on the roster.

In 2010, he joined V-League side SHB Đà Nẵng FC in 2010.

In 2012, Niko moved to Vietnamese First Division side QNK Quảng Nam. In the 2012 season, he scored five goals.
