= Tim Ward (soccer) =

American soccer player

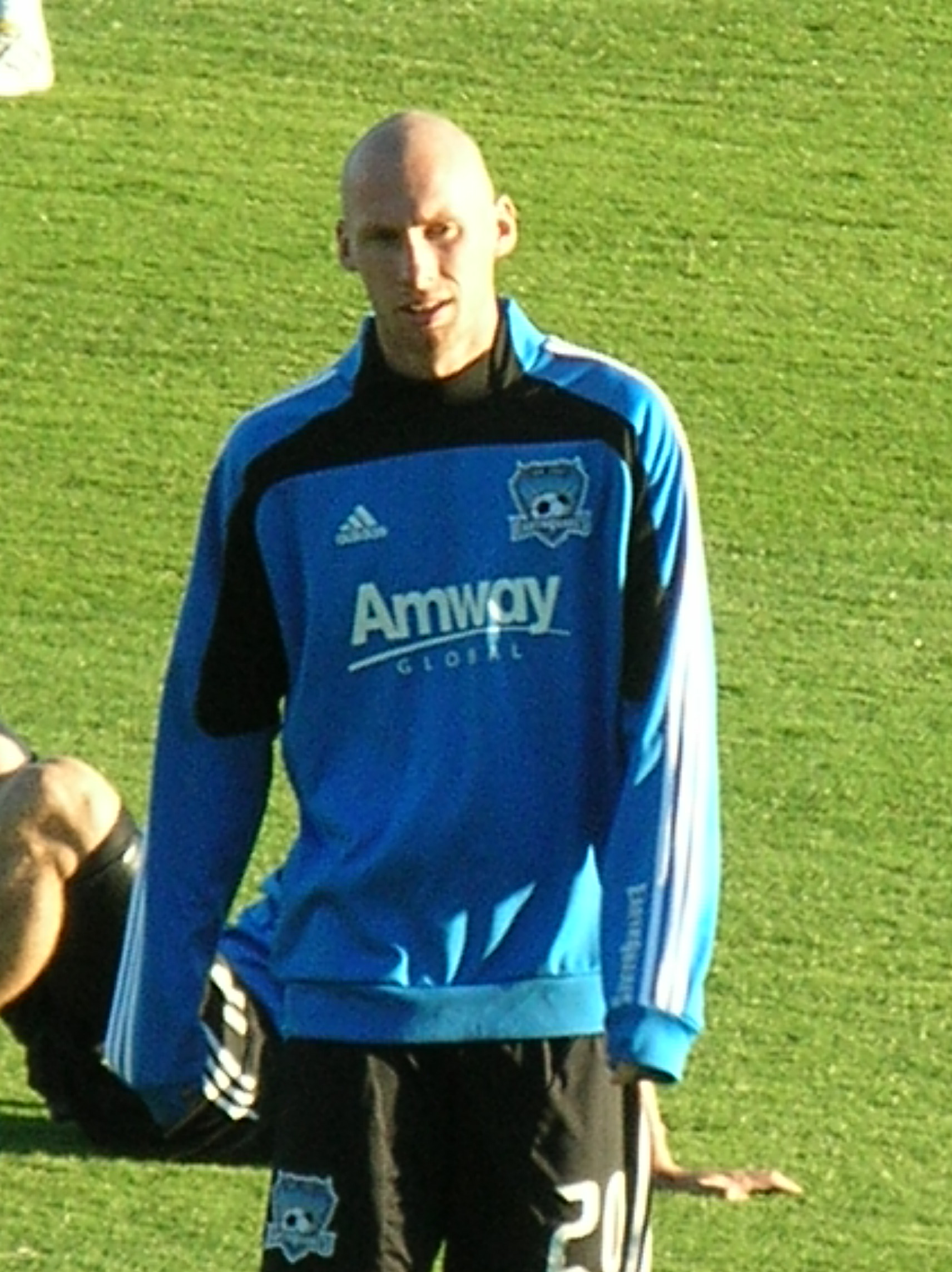
- Ward with the Earthquakes in September 2010

Personal information
- Full name: Timothy Robert Ward
- Date of birth: February 28, 1987 (age 39)
- Place of birth: Waukesha, Wisconsin, United States
- Height: 6 ft 0 in (1.83 m)
- Positions: Defender; midfielder

Youth career
- 2002–2004: IMG Soccer Academy
- 2004: St. Louis Billikens

Senior career*
Years	Team	Apps	(Gls)
2005	MetroStars	14	(0)
2006–2008	Columbus Crew	23	(0)
2008	Colorado Rapids	0	(0)
2009–2010	Chicago Fire	31	(0)
2010–2012	San Jose Earthquakes	20	(0)

International career^{‡}
2001–2002	United States U16	11	(1)
2002–2004	United States U17	35	(3)
2003–2004	United States U18	14	(1)
2004–2007	United States U20	28	(2)
2007	United States U23	4	(0)
- * Club domestic league appearances and goals as of December 3, 2012 ‡ National team caps and goals as of August 10, 2012

Timothy Robert Ward (born February 28, 1987, in Waukesha, Wisconsin) is an American former professional soccer player.

== Career ==
=== Youth and college ===
Ward, who can play any position on defense and also in defensive midfield, played 1 season in Wales, WI at Kettle Moraine High School before he trained with the United States Under-17 team at the Bradenton Academy from 2002 to 2004. Following his graduation, he played a year of college soccer at Saint Louis University, starting 18 games for the Billikens, and being named second-team All-Conference USA.

=== Professional ===
Ward left after his freshman season to sign a Generation adidas contract with MLS, whereupon he was selected 12th overall in the 2005 MLS SuperDraft by the MetroStars, who acquired the pick by trading Cornell Glen to FC Dallas. He was drafted in the first round as a 17 year old. Ward acquitted himself well in his rookie season, especially with his runs and crosses from the left back spot. After the year, he was traded to Columbus Crew for Chris Henderson.

After two seasons in Columbus, Ward was traded to Colorado Rapids on February 27, 2008, for Nicolas Hernández. However, his contract expired at the end of the 2008 season without playing a first-team game. He was on trial with Chicago Fire for most of early 2009, eventually signing with the team in March. In 2009 Ward started all 19 games he appeared in for Chicago before breaking his left foot in the Superliga final against Mexican powerhouse Tigres and opting for surgery. Ward returned to Chicago in 2010. On August 6, 2010, Ward was traded to San Jose Earthquakes for a 2011 MLS SuperDraft pick. Ward remained with San Jose through the 2012 season appearing in 16 league matches until his contract expired on December 31, 2012. Unfortunately, Ward has to retire early because of a torn hamstring tendon suffered in a preseason game against eventual English Premier League Champions Leicester City.

=== International ===
Ward has played for various youth United States national teams, and was part of the Under-20 team at the 2005 World Youth Championship. He had to miss the tournament due to an injury. Ward also was a member of the Under-20 team at the 2007 World Youth Championship. Was also named to the 2008 Beijing Olympic United States men's national under-23 soccer team but missed out due to injury.
