= Ryan Cordeiro =

American soccer player (born 1986)

Personal information
- Date of birth: May 6, 1986 (age 40)
- Place of birth: Highland Mills, New York, USA
- Height: 5 ft 9 in (1.75 m)
- Positions: Midfielder; forward

College career
Years	Team	Apps	(Gls)
2004–2007	UConn Huskies		

Senior career*
Years	Team	Apps	(Gls)
2008	D.C. United	8	(0)
2009	Real Maryland Monarchs	15	(0)
Total		23	(0)
- * Club domestic league appearances and goals

Ryan Cordeiro (born May 6, 1986) is an American former professional soccer player. He attended Monroe-Woodbury High School and played college soccer at the University of Connecticut. He then played in Major League Soccer for D.C. United in the 2008 season, being waived for 2009. He finished his career with Real Maryland Monarchs.
