= Kenny Schoeni =

American soccer player

Personal information
- Full name: Kenny Schoeni
- Date of birth: January 4, 1984 (age 42)
- Place of birth: Cincinnati, Ohio, U.S.
- Height: 6 ft 3 in (1.91 m)
- Position: Goalkeeper

College career
Years	Team	Apps	(Gls)
2002–2005	Vanderbilt Commodores		
2006	UC Irvine Anteaters		

Senior career*
Years	Team	Apps	(Gls)
2007	MLS Pool	–	(–)
2007	→ Columbus Crew (loan)	0	(0)
2008–2009	Columbus Crew	0	(0)
2009	Miami FC	7	(0)
2009–2010	Columbus Crew	1	(0)
- * Club domestic league appearances and goals as of 16 May 2010

Kenny Schoeni (born January 4, 1984) is an American retired soccer player.

== Career ==
=== Youth and college ===
Schoeni attended Sycamore High School in Cincinnati, Ohio before going to play college soccer at Vanderbilt University from 2003 to 2006, when the Commodores soccer program was discontinued. He finished his undergraduate degree in neuroscience at Vanderbilt and transferred to University of California, Irvine for his final year of eligibility, while attending graduate school. While at Vanderbilt he was named the ESPN The Magazine Academic All-District IV in 2005, was a two-time All-Missouri Valley Conference scholar-athlete, and was named a NSCAA Scholar All-South honorable mention. At UC Irvine he recorded a school record nine shutouts, was named Big West Co-Goalkeeper of the Year, and was named to the All-Big West First Team.

=== Professional ===
Undrafted out of college, Schoeni was an MLS pool goalkeeper in 2007. He trained frequently with the Columbus Crew, playing in two MLS Reserve Division games for the team, but never made a senior appearance. He was signed to Columbus's full roster in 2008, but again spent the entire year on the bench, and was waived one week into the 2009 MLS season.

Schoeni signed with Miami FC of the USL First Division in April 2009, and made his debut for the team on June 12, 2009, in a game against the Vancouver Whitecaps.

Schoeni returned to the Crew, for whom he made 5 MLS Reserve Division appearances in 2008, on September 18, 2009, following the conclusion of the 2009 USL season. He made his first MLS start on October 25, 2009, during the Crew's final regular season game, a 1–0 loss to the New England Revolution. Following the game on May 15, 2010, Schoeni retired.
