= Eddie Hertsenberg =

American soccer player (born 1986)

Personal information
- Full name: Charles Hertsenberg
- Date of birth: March 18, 1986 (age 40)
- Place of birth: United States
- Height: 6 ft 0 in (1.83 m)
- Position: Midfielder

Youth career
- 2002–2005: Elder HS
- Cincinnati Express
- Ohio Elite Soccer Academy
- TCYO United
- 2005: Cincinnati State College
- 2006–2007: Ohio Dominican University
- 2007: Columbus Crew

Senior career*
Years	Team	Apps	(Gls)
2008–2010	Cincinnati Kings		
2011	Dayton Dutch Lions	21	(1)
2012	FC Deisenhofen	1	(0)
2013–2015	Dayton Dutch Lions	15	(0)
2012–2014	Cincinnati Saints (indoor)	32	(34)

Managerial career
- 2010–2011: Dutch Lions Women's
- 2012–2013: Dayton Dutch Lions
- 2019-2020: Hamilton High School Girls
- 2021-2022: Columbus Eagles FC Women's Indoor
- * Club domestic league appearances and goals as of March 24, 2014

Charles "Eddie" Hertsenberg (born March 18, 1986) is an American soccer player who last played for the Dayton Dutch Lions. He is now a coach and manager in central Ohio.

== Career ==
=== Player ===
==== Youth ====
Growing up, Hertsenberg played for the Ohio Elite Soccer Academy, TCYO United, 1790 Cincinnati Express indoor academy. In 2005, Hertsenberg played for Cincinnati State College, scoring 10 goals and netting five assists in eight matches. He transferred to Ohio Dominican University and played for the Panthers for the remainder of his collegiate career.

==== Senior ====
Hertsenberg started his senior career 2008 with Cincinnati Kings having previously played for their academy. In December 2010, Hertsenberg joined the Dayton Dutch Lions for their inaugural season in the USL Professional Division. Hertsenberg scored the Dutch Lions' first goal in a 3–3 draw with the Cincinnati Kings.

In July 2012, Hertsenberg left the Dutch Lions to join the German Landesliga Südost side FC Deisenhofen before returning to the Dutch Lions on November 1, 2012. In 2013, he joined the Cincinnati Saints of the Professional Arena Soccer League, tallying 57 contributions in 32 games.

=== Coach ===
He was named in December 2010 as head coach of the Dayton Dutch Lions Women's Academy. After his return on November 1, 2012, Eddie was appointed Head Coach of the Dayton Dutch Lions Academy.

After leaving the Dutch Lions, Hertsenberg led Arizona high school Hamilton girls soccer team to the 2020 state championship, where he lost to Chaparral. He now manages the Columbus Eagles FC Women's Indoor team and serves as assistant coach for the Columbus Crew Academy U15 and U17 teams.
