= 2010 Columbus Crew season =

Columbus Crew
2010 season
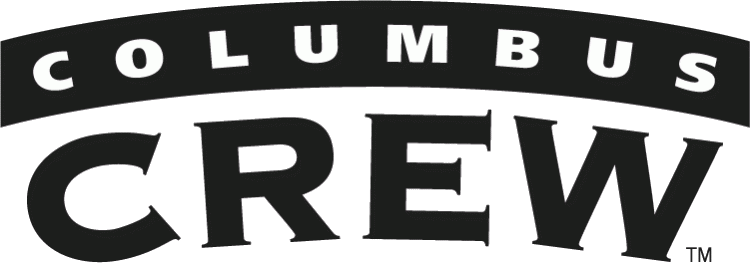
- Investor-operators: Clark Hunt; Dan Hunt; Lamar Hunt Jr. Sharron Hunt Munson; Ron Pizzuti and a group of local investors
- Head Coach: Robert Warzycha
- Stadium: Columbus Crew Stadium
- Major League Soccer: Conference: 2nd Overall: 5th
- MLS Cup playoffs: Conference semifinals
- U.S. Open Cup: Runners-up
- 2009–10 CONCACAF Champions League: Quarterfinals
- 2010–11 CONCACAF Champions League: Quarterfinals
- Top goalscorer: League: Guillermo Barros Schelotto (9); All: Guillermo Barros Schelotto (12)
- Highest home attendance: 19,006 (10/24 v. PHI)
- Lowest home attendance: 1,790 (6/29 v. ROC)
- Average home league attendance: 14,372 (71.3%)
- Biggest win: CLB 3–0 CHA (7/6); CLB 3–0 HOU (7/24); CLB 3–0 JOE (9/14); JOE 1-4 CLB (10/21)
- Biggest defeat: CLB 0–4 SEA (9/18)
Home colors	Away colors

The 2010 Columbus Crew season was the club's 15th season of existence and their 15th consecutive season in Major League Soccer, the top flight of soccer in the United States and Canada. The first match of the season was on March 27 against Toronto FC. It was the second season under head coach Robert Warzycha.

== Review ==
Prior to the start of the 2010 MLS season, the Crew began play in the CONCACAF Champions League, with a quarterfinal-fixture against Group B winner, Toluca of Mexico.

During group stage, the Crew finished in a second place in their group with an even 2-2-2 record, narrowly edging the Costa Rican champions Saprissa to become the only American club in the knockout stage. On February 22, 2010; Columbus hosted Toluca before 4,500 people at Crew Stadium for the first leg. For the match, Columbus would be missing veteran striker Guillermo Barros Schelotto and defender Frankie Hejduk.

In the match, Mexican-international Sinha opened the scoring giving Los Rojos a critical away goal and the lead over the Crew. Following the goal near misses from Steven Lenhart and Eddie Gaven later on in the half almost drew things level. Shortly before halftime, however, Antonio Ríos doubled the lead for Toluca giving them a very strong advantage. However, the Rojos would relinquish their lead in the second half. Lenhart would bag a pair of goals in the 66th and 83rd minute of play to draw the match back on parity, and the Crew would head to Toluca tied at two on aggregate.

== Roster ==
As of Aug 5, 2010.

Note: Flags indicate national team as defined under FIFA eligibility rules; some limited exceptions apply. Players may hold more than one non-FIFA nationality.

No.	Pos.	Nation	Player
1	GK	USA	William Hesmer
2	DF	USA	Frankie Hejduk (captain)
3	DF	USA	Josh Williams
4	DF	ARG	Gino Padula
5	DF	USA	Danny O'Rourke
6	DF	ENG	Andy Iro (INT)
7	FW	ARG	Guillermo Barros Schelotto (INT; DP)
8	DF	NZL	Duncan Oughton
9	FW	USA	Jason Garey
10	FW	PER	Andrés Mendoza (INT; DP)
11	MF	USA	Dilly Duka (SUP)
12	MF	USA	Eddie Gaven

No.	Pos.	Nation	Player
13	MF	FRA	Léandre Griffit (INT)
14	DF	USA	Chad Marshall
15	MF	USA	Kevin Burns (SUP)
16	MF	USA	Brian Carroll
17	MF	NGR	Emmanuel Ekpo
18	MF	USA	Robbie Rogers
20	FW	VEN	Emilio Rentería (INT)
22	MF	SCO	Adam Moffat (INT)
23	DF	USA	Eric Brunner
25	GK	USA	Chase Harrison
29	DF	JAM	Shaun Francis (INT; SUP)
30	GK	USA	Andy Gruenebaum
32	FW	USA	Steven Lenhart

== Technical Staff ==
Position	Staff
President/General Manager	(United States) Mark McCullers
Technical Director	(United States) Brian Bliss
Head Coach	(Poland) Robert Warzycha
Assistant Coach	(Argentina) Ricardo Iribarren
Assistant Coach	(United States) Mike Lapper
Assistant Coach	(Russia) Vadim Kirillov
Strength & Fitness Coach	(United States) Mike Tremble
Head Trainer	(United States) David Lagow
Assistant Trainer	(United States) Skylar Richards
Director of Team Operations	(United States) Tucker Walther
Equipment Manager	(United States) Rusty Wummel

Last updated: June 23, 2010
Source: Columbus Crew

== Non-competitive ==
=== Preseason ===
The Crew started preseason in Columbus and played games in Florida and Arizona before returning to Ohio. The Crew brought in the following trialists during training camp Ray Burse, Hugo Acosta, Kamil Witkowski, Doudou Touré, Yevhen Bredun, Sergei Kosov, Ireneusz Kowalski, Carlos Diaz, Conor O'Brien and Miloš Kocić.

Unsigned draft picks Dilly Duka, Bright Dike, Shaun Francis and Othaniel Yanez also joined the team for preseason.

February 6 Friendly	Columbus Crew	8-0	U.S. U-17 National Team	Bradenton, FL
	Marshall; Barros Schelotto; Rogers; Herrera; Lenhart; Rentería; Duka; Dike	Report		Stadium: IMG Academy
Note: Three scrimmages of 45 minutes, 30 minutes and 30 minutes

February 9 Friendly	Columbus Crew	2-1	U.S. U-17 National Team	Bradenton, FL
	Marshall 12'; Barros Schelotto 52'	Report	22'	Stadium: IMG Academy

February 9 Friendly	IMG Academy U-19 Team	0-4	Columbus Crew	Bradenton, FL
		Report	Garey 4', 25', 50'; Moffat 56'	Stadium: IMG Academy

February 13 Friendly	Columbus Crew	1-0	D.C. United	Bradenton, FL
	McTavish 8' (o.g.)	Report		Stadium: IMG Academy

February 21 Friendly	Columbus Crew	0-0	Los Angeles Galaxy	Tempe, AZ
		Report		Stadium: Sun Devil Stadium

February 23 Friendly	Columbus Crew	1-1	Colorado Rapids	Casa Grande, AZ
	Lenhart 4'	Report	Cummings 19' (pen.)	Stadium: Grande Sports Complex

February 27 Friendly	Columbus Crew	4-1	Chivas USA	Phoenix, AZ
	Brunner 36'; Herrera 82', 100'; Rentería 105'	Report	56'	Stadium: Reach 11 Sports Complex
Note: Played in four 30-minute periods.

March 3 Friendly	Arizona Sahuaros	0-3	Columbus Crew	Phoenix, AZ
		Report	Barros Schelotto 45' (pen.); Elenio 85'; Duka 90'	Stadium: Grand Canyon University

March 4 Friendly	Columbus Crew	1-1	Kansas City Wizards	Phoenix, AZ
	Carroll 17'	Report	Zusi 75'	Stadium: Reach 11 Sports Complex

March 10 Friendly	Columbus Crew	3-2	Notre Dame Fighting Irish	Columbus, OH
11:00 AM EST	Rentería 20'; Barros Schelotto 31'; Elenio 87'	Report	Perry 56', 64'	Stadium: Columbus Crew Stadium

March 20 Lamar Hunt Pioneer Cup	FC Dallas	2-1	Columbus Crew	Frisco, TX
	Ferreira 16'; Harris 34'; Avila (yellow card) 81'; Guarda (yellow card) 86'	Report	Oughton (yellow card) 29'; Rentería (yellow card) 34'; Garey (yellow card) 68'; Iro 62'; Herrera (yellow card) 69'; Burns (red card) 76'	Stadium: Pizza Hut Park

=== Midseason ===
The Crew played some friendly matches during the season to keep fit during bye weeks or to get reserve players minutes. Saidi Isaac, Douglas Reisinger, Michael Amicone were guest players against Marshall Thundering Herd, assistant coach Mike Lapper subbed in against Michigan State Spartans, John Owoeri was a guest player against Duquesne Dukes, and draft pick Kwaku Nyamekye joined the team for the match against Dayton Dutch Lions.

April 2 Friendly	Columbus Crew	5-0	Marshall Thundering Herd	Columbus, OH
	Gaven; Herrera; Barros Schelotto; Griffit; Isaac	Report		Stadium: Columbus Crew Stadium

April 2 Friendly	Columbus Crew	5-0	Michigan State Spartans	Columbus, OH
	Garey 21'; Lenhart 37'; Ekpo 42'; Iro 76'; Rentería 88'	Report		Stadium: Columbus Crew Stadium

April 17 Friendly	Columbus Crew	5-0	Duquesne Dukes	Columbus, OH
	Oughton; Ekpo; Burns; Garey,	Report		Stadium: Columbus Crew Stadium
Note: 45 minute scrimmage

April 17 Friendly	Columbus Crew	0-1	Louisville Cardinals	Columbus, OH
		Report	Goal	Stadium: Columbus Crew Stadium
Note: 45 minute scrimmage

May 4 Connor Senn Memorial Game	Ohio State Buckeyes	4-0	Columbus Crew	Columbus, OH
7:00 PM EDT		Report	Garey 16', 30', 74'; Herrera 31'	Stadium: Jesse Owens Memorial Stadium

June 19 Friendly	Dayton Dutch Lions	0-3	Columbus Crew	Dayton, OH
		Report	Lenhart; Gaven 55'; Garey 84'	Stadium: Baujan Field

== Competitive ==
=== Overview ===
Competition	First match	Last match	Starting round	Final position	Record							
Competition	First match	Last match	Starting round	Final position	Pld	W	D	L	GF	GA	GD	Win %
Major League Soccer	March 27, 2010	October 24, 2010	Matchday 1	5th	30	14	8	8	40	34	+6	46.67
MLS Cup Playoffs	October 28, 2010	November 5, 2010	Conference Semifinals	Conference Semifinals	2	1	0	1	2	2	+0	50.00
U.S. Open Cup	June 29, 2010	October 5, 2010	Third Round	Final	4	3	0	1	8	4	+4	75.00
2009–10 CONCACAF Champions League	March 9, 2010	March 17, 2010	Quarterfinals	Quarterfinals	2	0	1	1	4	5	−1	0.00
2010–11 CONCACAF Champions League	August 18, 2010	October 21, 2010	Group Stage	Quarterfinals	6	4	0	2	10	4	+6	66.67
Total					44	22	9	13	64	49	+15	50.00

Source: Competitions

=== MLS ===
==== Standings ====
===== Eastern Conference =====
Pos	Team	Pld	W	L	T	GF	GA	GD	Pts	Qualification
1	New York Red Bulls	30	15	9	6	38	29	+9	51	Qualification for the conference semifinals
2	Columbus Crew	30	14	8	8	40	34	+6	50	Qualification for the conference semifinals
3	Kansas City Wizards	30	11	13	6	36	35	+1	39	
4	Chicago Fire	30	9	12	9	37	38	−1	36	
5	Toronto FC	30	9	13	8	33	41	−8	35	

Source: MLS

===== Overall table =====
Pos	Team	Pld	W	L	T	GF	GA	GD	Pts	
3	New York Red Bulls	30	15	9	6	38	29	+9	51	
4	FC Dallas	30	12	4	14	42	28	+14	50	Qualification for the CONCACAF Champions League
5	Columbus Crew	30	14	8	8	40	34	+6	50	
6	Seattle Sounders FC (U)	30	14	10	6	39	35	+4	48	Qualification for the CONCACAF Champions League
7	Colorado Rapids (C)	30	12	8	10	44	32	+12	46	Qualification for the CONCACAF Champions League

Source: MLS
Rules for classification: 1) points; 2) head-to-head record; 3) goal difference; 4) number of goals scored
(C) MLS Cup champions; (U) U.S. Open Cup winners

==== Results summary ====
Overall								Home						Away					
Pld	Pts	W	L	T	GF	GA	GD	W	L	T	GF	GA	GD	W	L	T	GF	GA	GD
30	50	14	8	8	40	34	+6	10	3	2	22	12	+10	4	5	6	18	22	−4

Last updated: September 12, 2010
Source: MLSSoccer.com
Pld = Matches played; Pts = Points; W = Matches won; T = Matches tied; L = Matches lost; GF = Goals for; GA = Goals against; GD = Goal difference

==== Results by round ====
Round	1	2	3	4	5	6	7	8	9	10	11	12	13	14	15	16	17	18	19	20	21	22	23	24	25	26	27	28	29	30
Stadium	H	A	H	A	H	H	A	A	H	A	A	H	H	A	H	H	H	A	A	A	H	H	A	A	H	A	H	A	A	H
Result	W	T	W	T	W	W	W	W	L	T	L	W	W	T	L	W	W	L	W	L	W	T	W	L	L	T	T	L	T	W

Updated to match(es) played on September 12, 2010. Source: MLS Results and League table
A = Away; H = Home; W = Win; L = Loss; T = Tie

==== Match results ====
March 27 1	Columbus Crew	2–0	Toronto FC	Columbus, OH
4:00 PM EDT	Iro 29'; Barros Schelotto 89'; Moffat (yellow card) 90+2'	Report	Saric (yellow card) 23'; Attakora (yellow card) 77'	Stadium: Columbus Crew Stadium; Attendance: 13,536; Referee: Mark Geiger; Assistant referees: Thomas Supple; James Conlee; Fourth official: Steven Depiero

April 10 2	FC Dallas	2–2	Columbus Crew	Frisco, TX
8:30 PM EDT	Cunningham 29' (pen.); Pearce (yellow card) 61'; Avila 90+3'	Report	Moffat 52'; Carroll (yellow card) 55'; Barros Schelotto 82' (pen.); O'Rourke (red card) 90+3'	Stadium: Pizza Hut Park; Attendance: 8,422; Referee: Jasen Anno; Assistant referees: Anthony Vasoli; Nate Clement; Fourth official: Jeff Gontarek

April 24 3	Columbus Crew	1–0	Real Salt Lake	Columbus, OH
7:30 PM EDT	Barros Schelotto 38' (pen.)	Report	Beckerman (yellow card) 50'	Stadium: Columbus Crew Stadium; Attendance: 14,322; Referee: Steven DePiero; Assistant referees: Joe Fletcher; Héctor Vergara; Fourth official: Andrew Chapin

May 1 4	Seattle Sounders FC	1–1	Columbus Crew	Seattle, WA
10:30 PM EDT	Zakuani 4'	Report	O'Rourke (yellow card) 28' (yellow-red card) 85'; Lenhart 45'; Carroll (yellow card) 59'; Barros Schelotto (yellow card) 87'	Stadium: Qwest Field; Attendance: 36,219; Referee: Ricardo Salazar; Assistant referees: Corey Rockwell; Darren Clark; Fourth official: Paul Ward

May 8 5	Columbus Crew	3–2	New England Revolution	Columbus, OH
7:00 PM EDT	Gaven 31'; Gibbs 35' (o.g.); Moffat (yellow card) 77'; Rogers 90+1', (yellow card) 90+1'	Report	Boggs 29' 40'	Stadium: Columbus Crew Stadium; Attendance: 10,197; Referee: Ramon Hernandez; Assistant referees: Jason Cullum; Steve Taylor; Fourth official: Jeff Gontarek

May 15 6	Columbus Crew	1–0	Chivas USA	Columbus, OH
7:30 PM EDT	Hejduk (yellow card) 55'; Barros Schelotto 90' (pen.)	Report	Umana (yellow card) 15'; Padilla (yellow card) 60'; Zemanski (yellow card) 77'	Stadium: Columbus Crew Stadium; Attendance: 15,027; Referee: Jeff Gontarek; Assistant referees: Craig Lowry; Jeff Muschik; Fourth official: Hilario Grajeda

May 20 7	New York Red Bulls	1–3	Columbus Crew	Harrison, NJ
8:00 PM EDT	Stammler (yellow card) 75'; Tchani 81'; Ream (yellow card) 85'	Report	Gaven 35'; Iro 39', (yellow card) 60'; Moffat (yellow card) 51'; Rentería 83'	Stadium: Red Bull Arena; Attendance: 11,940; Referee: Baldomero Toledo; Assistant referees: C.J. Morgante; Peter Manikowski; Fourth official: Jorge Gonzalez

May 23 8	Kansas City Wizards	0–1	Columbus Crew	Kansas City, KS
4:00 PM EDT	Smith (yellow card) 35'; Rocastle (yellow card) 90'	Report	Ekpo (yellow card) 44'; Padula (yellow card) 56'; Rentería 64'; Hesmer (yellow card) 90'	Stadium: CommunityAmerica Ballpark; Attendance: 10,385; Referee: Alejandro Mariscal; Assistant referees: George Gansner; Thomas Supple; Fourth official: Terry Vaughn

May 29 9	Columbus Crew	0–2	Los Angeles Galaxy	Columbus, OH
7:30 PM EDT	Zayner (yellow card) 35'	Report	Stephens 10'; Gonzalez (yellow card) 25'; DeLaGarza (yellow card) 29'; Birchall (yellow card) 78'; Bowen 87'; Dunivant (yellow card) 90'	Stadium: Columbus Crew Stadium; Attendance: 18,139; Referee: Michael Kennedy; Assistant referees: Claudiu Badea; Brian Poeschel; Fourth official: Hilario Grajeda

June 2 10	San Jose Earthquakes	2–2	Columbus Crew	Santa Clara, CA
10:00 PM EDT	Alvarez 6'; Wondolowski (yellow card) 40', (goal) 79'; Burling (yellow card) 43'	Report	Gaven 5'; Zayner (yellow card) 55'; Brunner (yellow card) 62'; Marshall 70'	Stadium: Buck Shaw Stadium; Attendance: 8,033; Referee: Jasen Anno; Assistant referees: Chris Strickland; Paul Scott; Fourth official: Yader Reyes

June 5 11	Colorado Rapids	1–0	Columbus Crew	Commerce City, CO
9:00 PM EDT	Casey (yellow card) 43'; Baudet (yellow card) 58'; Mastroeni (red card) 76'; Moor 85'	Report	Moffat (yellow card) 40'; Lenhart (yellow card) 76'; Rentería (yellow card) 88'	Stadium: Dick's Sporting Goods Park; Attendance: 14,318; Referee: Kevin Stott; Assistant referees: Nate Clement; Kermit Quisenberry; Fourth official: Yader Reyes

June 26 12	Columbus Crew	2–0	D.C. United	Columbus, OH
7:30 PM EDT	Barros Schelotto 57'; Brunner 87'	Report	Najar (yellow card) 52'	Stadium: Columbus Crew Stadium; Attendance: 15,335; Referee: Terry Vaughn; Assistant referees: Philippe Brière; Daniel Belleau; Fourth official: Landis Wiley

July 3 13	Columbus Crew	2–1	Chicago Fire	Columbus, OH
8:00 PM EDT	Moffat 43'; Garey 45+2'	Report	Hejduk 44' (o.g.); Robinson (yellow card) 45'	Stadium: Columbus Crew Stadium; Attendance: 14,017; Referee: Alex Prus; Assistant referees: Thomas Supple; Adam Garner; Fourth official: Landis Wiley

July 10 14	Houston Dynamo	0–0	Columbus Crew	Houston, TX
8:30 PM EDT	Hainault (yellow card) 73'	Report	Padula (yellow card) 88'	Stadium: Robertson Stadium; Attendance: 13,486; Referee: Michael Kennedy; Assistant referees: Chris Strickland; Kermit Quisenberry; Fourth official: Terry Vaughn

July 14 15	Columbus Crew	0–1	Kansas City Wizards	Columbus, OH
7:30 PM EDT	Hejduk (yellow card) 40'	Report	Bunbury 14'	Stadium: Columbus Crew Stadium; Attendance: 11,304; Referee: Steven DePiero; Assistant referees: Greg Barkey; James Conlee; Fourth official: Jasen Anno

July 17 16	Columbus Crew	2–0	New York Red Bulls	Columbus, OH
7:30 PM EDT	Rentería 20'; Carroll 48'; Hejduk (red card) 89'	Report	Mendes (yellow card) 10'	Stadium: Columbus Crew Stadium; Attendance: 14,378; Referee: Abbey Okulaja; Assistant referees: Joe Fletcher; Jeff Muschik; Fourth official: Silviu Petrescu

July 24 17	Columbus Crew	3–0	Houston Dynamo	Columbus, OH
7:30 PM EDT	O'Rourke (yellow card) 22'; Rentería 34'; Iro 84'; Griffit 90'	Report	Chabala (yellow card) 2'; Boswell (red card) 72'	Stadium: Columbus Crew Stadium; Attendance: 13,585; Referee: Alex Prus; Assistant referees: Craig Lowry; C.J. Morgante; Fourth official: Hilario Grajeda

July 31 18	Chivas USA	3–1	Columbus Crew	Carson, CA
10:30 PM EDT	Braun 37'; Gavin 45'; Borja 53'	Report	Francis (yellow card) 85'; Lenhart 88'	Stadium: Home Depot Center; Attendance: 13,419; Referee: Hilario Grajeda; Assistant referees: Chris Strickland; George Gansner; Fourth official: Alejandro Mariscal

August 5 19	Philadelphia Union	1–2	Columbus Crew	Chester, PA
8:00 PM EDT	Fred (yellow card) 42'; Le Toux 45+3'	Report	Carroll (yellow card) 37'; Lenhart 43', 50'	Stadium: PPL Park; Attendance: 18,001; Referee: Ricardo Salazar; Assistant referees: Paul Scott; Brian Poeschel; Fourth official: Abbey Okulaja

August 14 20	Real Salt Lake	2–0	Columbus Crew	Sandy, UT
9:00 PM EDT	Morales 11', 60'	Report	Hejduk (yellow card) 48'	Stadium: Rio Tinto Stadium; Attendance: 16,906; Referee: Jorge Gonzalez; Assistant referees: Craig Lowry; Ian Anderson; Fourth official: Yader Reyes

August 21 21	Columbus Crew	3–1	Colorado Rapids	Columbus, OH
7:30 PM EDT	Barros Schelotto 6' (pen.)); Hejduk (yellow card) 22'; Garey 53'; Moffat (yellow card) 75'; Lenhart 80'	Report	Mastroeni 45+1'	Stadium: Columbus Crew Stadium; Attendance: 16,063; Referee: Edvin Jurisevic; Assistant referees: Jason Cullum; Adam Garner; Fourth official: Hilario Grajeda

August 28 22	Columbus Crew	0–0	FC Dallas	Columbus, OH
4:00 PM EDT	Moffat (yellow card) 28'; Barros Schelotto (yellow card) 77'	Report	Loyd (yellow card) 40'; Hernández (yellow card) 77'; Harris (yellow card) 85'	Stadium: Columbus Crew Stadium; Attendance: 16,708; Referee: Andrew Chapin; Assistant referees: Kermit Quisenberry; Thomas Supple; Fourth official: Michael Kennedy

September 4 23	D.C. United	0–1	Columbus Crew	Washington, D.C.
7:30 PM EDT	Hernández (yellow card) 45+1'; Graye (yellow card) 57'	Report	Barros Schelotto 23'; Francis (yellow card) 47'; Duka (yellow card) 58'	Stadium: RFK Stadium; Attendance: 12,075; Referee: Hilario Grajeda; Assistant referees: Craig Lowry; Brian Poeschel; Fourth official: Lee Suckle

September 11 24	Los Angeles Galaxy	3–1	Columbus Crew	Carson, CA
10:30 PM EDT	Buddle 14'; Kovalenko 35'; Kirovski 55'; Magee (yellow card) 72'; Beckham (yellow card) 74'	Report	Mendoza 85'	Stadium: Home Depot Center; Attendance: 19,482; Referee: Alex Prus; Assistant referees: Adam Wienckowski; George Gansner; Fourth official: Kevin Stott

September 18 25	Columbus Crew	0–4	Seattle Sounders FC	Columbus, OH
7:30 PM EDT		Report	Nkufo 4', 39', 75'; Sturgis 42' (pen.); Scott (yellow card) 77'	Stadium: Columbus Crew Stadium; Attendance: 17,144; Referee: Jair Marrufo; Assistant referees: Joe Fletcher; Brian Poeschel; Fourth official: Chris Penso

September 25 26	New England Revolution	2–2	Columbus Crew	Foxborough, MA
7:30 PM EDT	Phelan 2', (yellow card) 90+4'; Perovic (yellow card) 37'; Joseph 56' (pen.)	Report	Hesmer (yellow card) 46'; Lenhart 62'; Francis (yellow card) 72'; Barros Schelotto 80' (pen.); Burns (yellow card) 88'	Stadium: Gillette Stadium; Attendance: 13,533; Referee: Paul Ward; Assistant referees: Cameron Blair; James Conlee; Fourth official: Jorge Gonzalez

October 2 27	Columbus Crew	0–0	San Jose Earthquakes	Columbus, OH
7:30 PM EDT		Report	Johnson (yellow card) 38'	Stadium: Columbus Crew Stadium; Attendance: 10,867; Referee: Jorge Gonzalez; Assistant referees: Adam Garner; Jason Cullum; Fourth official: Hilario Grajeda

October 8 28	Chicago Fire	2–0	Columbus Crew	Bridgeview, IL
8:30 PM EDT	Lowry 30', (yellow card) 88'; Kinney (yellow card) 41'; Brian McBride 53'; Brown (yellow card) 58'	Report	Moffat (yellow card) 25'; Brunner (yellow card) 37'	Stadium: Toyota Park; Attendance: 15,124; Referee: Edvin Jurisevic; Assistant referees: Craig Lowry; C.J. Morgante; Fourth official: Michael Kennedy

October 16 29	Toronto FC	2–2	Columbus Crew	Toronto, ON
4:00 PM EDT	Gargan (yellow card) 21'; Garcia (yellow card) 28'; Santos 29'; Peterson 38'; Conway (red card) 72'	Report	Marshall 15'; Iro (yellow card) 51'; Moffat (yellow card) 61'; Lenhart (red card) 71'; Hesmer 90+2'	Stadium: BMO Field; Attendance: 18,084; Referee: Jorge Gonzalez; Assistant referees: Adam Wienckowski; George Gansner; Fourth official: Geoff Gamble

October 24 30	Columbus Crew	3–1	Philadelphia Union	Columbus, OH
4:00 PM EDT	Barros Schelotto 15' (pen.); Rentería 42', (yellow card) 63'; Mendoza 79'	Report	Fiscal (yellow card) 63'; Torres (yellow card) 76'; Le Toux 87'	Stadium: Columbus Crew Stadium; Attendance: 19,006; Referee: Jair Marrufo; Assistant referees: Chris Strickland; Daniel Belleau; Fourth official: Hilario Grajeda

=== MLS Playoffs ===
==== Conference Semifinals ====
October 28 Leg 1	Colorado Rapids	1–0	Columbus Crew	Commerce City, CO
9:00 PM EDT	Mastroeni 23', (yellow card) 90+2'	Report	Carroll (yellow card) 57'	Stadium: Dick's Sporting Goods Park; Attendance: 11,872; Referee: Jair Marrufo; Assistant referees: George Gansner; Eric Boria; Fourth official: Edvin Jurisevic

November 6 Leg 2	Columbus Crew	2–1 (a.e.t.) (2–2 agg.) (4–5 p)	Colorado Rapids	Columbus, OH
4:00 PM EDT	Gaven 22'; Barros Schelotto (yellow card) 31'; Ekpo (yellow card) 52'; Carroll (yellow card) 56'; Francis (yellow card) 64'; Rogers 70', (yellow card) 70'	Report	Mullan (yellow card) 38'; Casey (yellow card) 48', (goal) 84'	Stadium: Columbus Crew Stadium; Attendance: 10,322; Referee: Michael Kennedy; Assistant referees: Chris Strickland; Philippe Brière; Fourth official: Terry Vaughn
	Penalties
	Barros Schelotto (penalty scored); Garey (penalty scored); Gaven (penalty scored); Brunner (penalty scored); Carroll (penalty missed)		(penalty scored) Casey; (penalty scored) Kandji; (penalty scored) Larentowicz; (penalty scored) López; (penalty scored) Smith

=== CONCACAF Champions League ===
==== 2009-10 Championship Round ====
Team	Pld	W	D	L	GF	GA	GD	Pts
(Mexico) Cruz Azul	6	5	1	0	16	4	+12	16
(United States) Columbus Crew	6	2	2	2	5	9	−4	8
(Costa Rica) Saprissa	6	1	2	3	6	8	−2	5
Puerto Rico Islanders	6	0	3	3	6	12	−6	3

===== Quarterfinals =====
March 9 Leg 1	Columbus Crew	2–2	Deportivo Toluca F.C. (Mexico)	Columbus, OH
8:00 PM EST	Lenhart 65', 83'	Report	Sinha 19'; Ríos 44'; Marín (yellow card) 63'; Brizuela (yellow card) 66'	Stadium: Columbus Crew Stadium; Referee: Courtney Campbell (Jamaica); Assistant referees: Anthony Garwood (Jamaica); Stephen Brown (Jamaica); Fourth official: Mark Geiger (United States)

March 17 Leg 2	Deportivo Toluca F.C. (Mexico)	3–2 (5-4 agg.)	Columbus Crew	Toluca, Mexico
6:00 PM EDT	Sinha (yellow card) 24', (goal) 57', 72'; Dueñas (yellow card) 39'; Mancilla 47' (pen.); González (yellow card) 76'	Report	Lenhart (yellow card) 31' (red card) 80'; Barros Schelotto 45' (pen.), (yellow card) 45+1', (goal) 70'; Carroll (yellow card) 56'	Stadium: Estadio Nemesio Díez; Referee: Paul Ward (Canada); Assistant referees: Hector Vergara (Canada); Darren Clark (Canada); Fourth official: Mauricio Morales (Mexico)

==== 2010-11 Group Stage ====
Team	Pld	W	D	L	GF	GA	GD	Pts
(Mexico) Santos Laguna	6	4	1	1	19	7	+12	13
(United States) Columbus Crew	6	4	0	2	10	4	+6	12
(Costa Rica) Municipal	6	2	2	2	9	13	−4	8
(Puerto Rico) Joe Public	6	0	1	5	7	21	−14	1

August 18 Group Stage	Columbus Crew (United States)	1–0	(Guatemala) C.S.D. Municipal	Columbus, OH
8:00 PM EDT	Ekpo 14'; O'Rourke (yellow card) 35'; Rentería (yellow card) 86'	Report	Ramírez (yellow card) 62'	Stadium: Columbus Crew Stadium; Attendance: 5,745; Referee: Roberto García (Mexico); Assistant referees: Alejandro Ayala (Mexico); Marcos Quintero (Mexico); Fourth official: Mark Geiger (United States)

August 24 Group Stage	Club Santos Laguna (Mexico)	1–0	(United States) Columbus Crew	Torreón, Mexico
10:00 PM EDT	Estrada 90+3'	Report	Rentería (yellow card) 24'; Iro (yellow card) 61'; Garey (yellow card) 78'; Gruenebaum (yellow card) 84'	Stadium: Nuevo Estadio Corona; Attendance: 4,700; Referee: Luis Rodriguez (Panama); Assistant referees: Gabriel Antonio Victoria (Panama); Benigno Paneso (Panama); Fourth official: Ricardo Arellano (Mexico)

September 14 Group Stage	Columbus Crew (United States)	3–0	(Trinidad and Tobago) Joe Public F.C.	Columbus, OH
8:00 PM EDT	Francis (yellow card) 6'; Griffit 47'; Garey 51'; Lenhart 79'	Report	Mitchell (yellow card) 31'; Williams (yellow card) 90'	Stadium: Columbus Crew Stadium; Attendance: 5,445; Referee: Walter López Castellanos (Guatemala); Assistant referees: Ariel Mendez (Guatemala); Glenda Beatriz Lopez (Guatemala); Fourth official: Jair Marrufo (United States)

September 21 Group Stage	Columbus Crew (United States)	1–0	(Mexico) Club Santos Laguna	Columbus, OH
8:00 PM EDT	Gaven (yellow card) 41'; Burns (yellow card) 73'; Mendoza 87'; Hejduk (yellow card) 90+3'	Report	Peralta (yellow card) 64'	Stadium: Columbus Crew Stadium; Attendance: 6,298; Referee: Courtney Campbell (Jamaica); Assistant referees: Anthony Garwood (Jamaica); Ricardo Morgan (Jamaica); Fourth official: Baldomero Toledo (United States)

September 29 Group Stage	C.S.D. Municipal (Guatemala)	2–1	(United States) Columbus Crew	Guatemala City, Guatemala
10:00 PM EDT	Ramírez 19', 39'; Romero (yellow card) 73'	Report	Padula (yellow card) 10'; Iro 44'; Moffat (yellow card) 76'; Lenhart (yellow card) 90'	Stadium: Estadio Mateo Flores; Attendance: 3,545; Referee: José Pineda (Honduras); Assistant referees: Rafael Antonio Beltran (Honduras); Juan Antonio Rodas (Honduras); Fourth official: David España (Guatemala)

October 21 Group Stage	Joe Public (Trinidad and Tobago)	1–4	(United States) Columbus Crew	Tunapuna, Trinidad and Tobago
8:00 PM EDT	Noel 27' (pen.)	Report	Mendoza 20'; Rentería 50' (pen.), 80'; Oughton 90+2'	Stadium: Marvin Lee Stadium; Attendance: 110; Referee: Stanley Lancaster (Guyana); Assistant referees: Dion Inniss (Guyana); Venton Mars (Guyana); Fourth official: Lee Davis (Trinidad and Tobago)

=== U.S. Open Cup ===
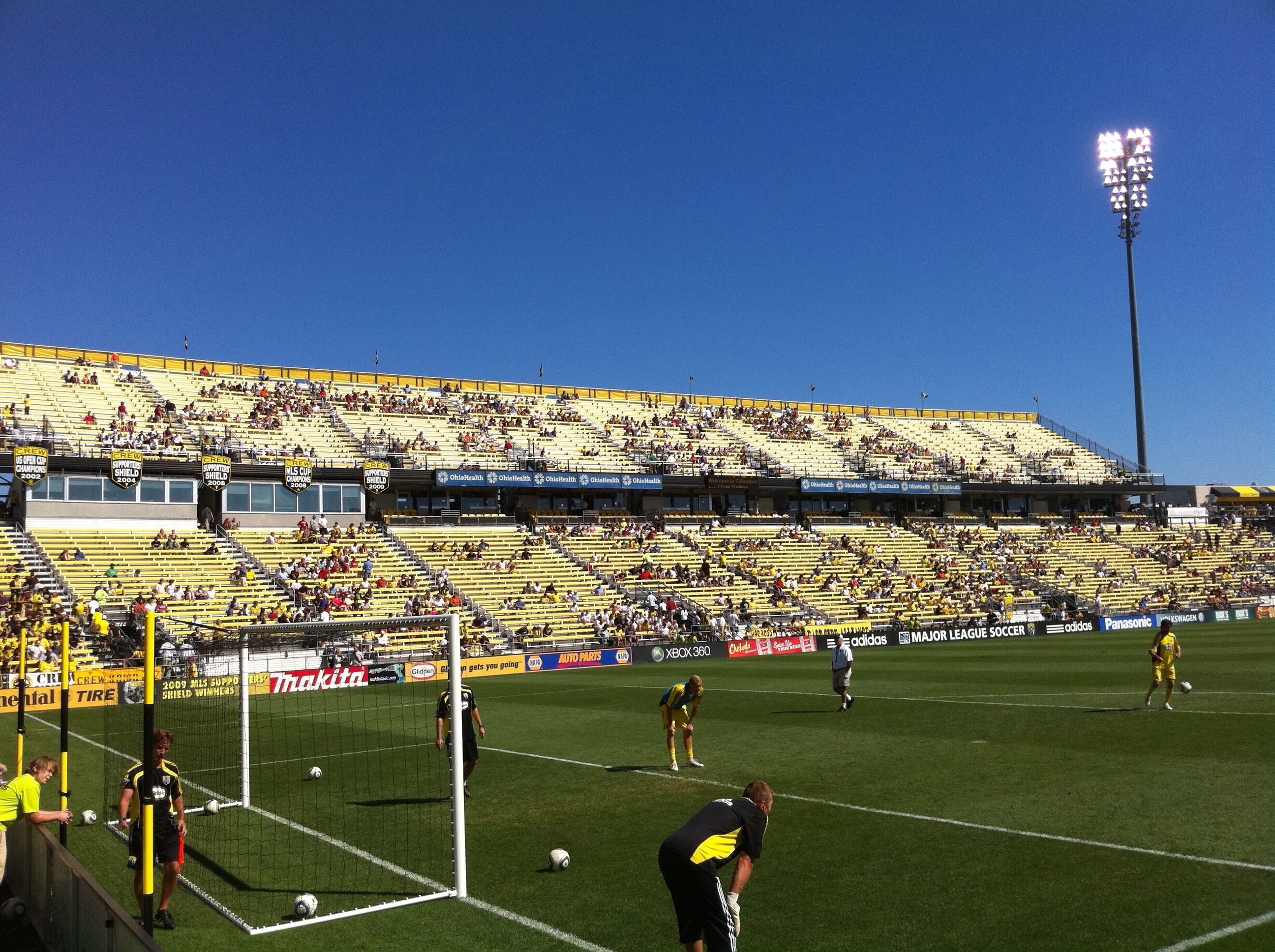
The Columbus Crew hosted U.S. Open Cup matches at Crew Stadium.

Prior to 2010, the Columbus Crew had been to the U.S. Open Cup final twice in 1998 and 2002 and only won the cup once in 2002. On June 29, 2010, the Crew began the competition in the third round hosting the Rochester Rhinos of the D2 Pro League at Columbus Crew Stadium in Columbus, Ohio. The Crew's Andy Iro scored first in the 30th minute by heading in a corner kick from teammate Eddie Gavin. Later, in the second half, Rochester evened the score at one when substitute Darren Spicer scored from 17 yards out. The Rhinos' Alfonso Motagalvan was sent off in the 84th minute for a dangerous tackle on Emilio Rentería forcing Rochester to play the final minutes of the game with just ten men on the field. The score remained level until the 4th minute of stoppage time when Steven Lenhart scored on a "half volley" giving Columbus the victory.

A week later on July 6, Columbus faced the Charleston Battery of the USL Second Division in the U.S. Open Cup quarterfinals. The match was hosted by Columbus, again at Crew Stadium. In the 37th minute, Steven Lenhart was fouled in the penalty area while going for a cross and the referee signalled for a penalty kick. Emilio Rentería took the penalty kick and drove a right-footed shot into the back of the net making the score 1–0. Columbus extended their lead in the 70th minute on a goal from Steven Lenhart, and again in the 87th minute when Eddie Gavin scored off of a pass from Emmanuel Ekpo. The Crew won 3–0 earning their first U.S. Open Cup semifinal appearance since 2002.

On September 1, 2010, the Columbus Crew visited Washington, D.C. to face MLS club D.C. United in their semifinal match at RFK Stadium. Pablo Hernández scored in the 17th minute on a penalty kick to give D.C. an early lead at 1–0. D.C. United almost kept that lead for the victory until the 89th minute when United's Marc Burch deflected a shot by Columbus's Andy Iro into the net for an own goal, tying the score and sending the match into extra time. In the 98th minute, the Crew's Steven Lenhart dribbled the ball into the 18-yard box and was tripped by D.C. United's Carey Talley to draw a penalty. Guillermo Barros Schelotto took the penalty kick and scored the game-winning goal. The 2–1 final score secured the Columbus Crew's spot in the final.

June 29 Third Round	Columbus Crew (MLS) (Ohio)	2–1	(New York (state)) Rochester Rhinos (D2 Pro)	Columbus, OH
7:30 PM EDT	Iro 30'; Lenhart 90+4'	Report	Spicer 69'; Motagalvan (red card) 85'	Stadium: Columbus Crew Stadium; Attendance: 1,790; Referee: Hilario Grajeda; Assistant referees: Michael Kinder; Sandip Basu; Fourth official: Sorin Stoica

July 6 Quarterfinals	Columbus Crew (MLS) (Ohio)	3–0	(South Carolina) Charleston Battery (USL-2)	Columbus, OH
7:30 PM EDT	Zayner (yellow card) 24'; Rentería 38' (pen.); Lenhart (yellow card) 42', (goal) 70'; Gaven 87'	Report	Fuller (yellow card) 37'; Woodbine (yellow card) 64'	Stadium: Columbus Crew Stadium; Attendance: 1,847; Referee: Hilario Grajeda; Assistant referees: John Safar; Pierre Saintil Francillon; Fourth official: Rizal Millikan

September 1 Semifinals	Columbus Crew (MLS) (Ohio)	2–1 (a.e.t.)	(Washington, D.C.) D.C. United (MLS)	Washington, D.C.
7:30 PM EDT	O'Rourke (yellow card) 59'; Iro 89'; Lenhart (yellow card) 96'; Barros Schelotto 98' (pen.)	Report	Hernández 13' (pen.), (red card) 59'; Jakovic (yellow card) 39'; Talley (yellow card) 97'	Stadium: Robert F. Kennedy Memorial Stadium; Attendance: 3,411; Referee: Chris Penso; Assistant referees: Sean Hurd; Cyril Madukanya; Fourth official: Jeff Gontarek

October 5 Final	Seattle Sounders FC (MLS) (Washington (state))	2–1	(Ohio) Columbus Crew (MLS)	Seattle, WA
10:00 PM EDT	Riley (yellow card) 23'; Nyassi 38', 66', (yellow card) 76'; Alonso (yellow card) 72'	Report	Burns 24'; Francis (yellow card) 28'; Carroll (yellow card) 41'; Barros Schelotto (yellow card) 87'	Stadium: Qwest Field; Attendance: 31,311; Referee: Michael Kennedy; Assistant referees: Thomas Supple; Paul Scott; Fourth official: Ricardo Salazar

== Statistics ==
=== Appearances and goals ===
Under "Apps" for each section, the first number represents the number of starts, and the second number represents appearances as a substitute.

No.	Pos	Nat	Player	Total		MLS		MLS Cup Playoffs		U.S. Open Cup		2009–10 CONCACAF Champions League		2010–11 CONCACAF Champions League	
No.	Pos	Nat	Player	Apps	Goals	Apps	Goals	Apps	Goals	Apps	Goals	Apps	Goals	Apps	Goals
1	GK	(United States) USA	William Hesmer	32	1	30+0	1	0+0	0	0+0	0	2+0	0	0+0	0
2	DF	(United States) USA	Frankie Hejduk	27	0	20+0	0	2+0	0	2+0	0	1+0	0	2+0	0
3	DF	(United States) USA	Josh Williams	2	0	0+0	0	0+0	0	0+0	0	0+0	0	2+0	0
4	DF	(Argentina) ARG	Gino Padula	18	0	13+2	0	0+0	0	1+0	0	0+0	0	2+0	0
5	DF	(United States) USA	Danny O'Rourke	23	0	14+3	0	0+0	0	2+1	0	2+0	0	1+0	0
6	DF	(England) ENG	Andy Iro	36	6	24+1	3	1+0	0	3+0	2	2+0	0	4+1	1
7	FW	(Argentina) ARG	Guillermo Barros Schelotto	35	12	29+0	9	2+0	0	2+0	1	1+0	2	1+0	0
8	DF	(New Zealand) NZL	Duncan Oughton	8	1	0+3	0	0+0	0	1+0	0	0+0	0	4+0	1
9	FW	(United States) USA	Jason Garey	34	3	9+13	2	0+2	0	0+2	0	0+2	0	4+2	1
10	FW	(Peru) PER	Andrés Mendoza	15	4	1+7	2	1+1	0	0+1	0	0+0	0	4+0	2
11	MF	(United States) USA	Dilly Duka	10	0	2+1	0	0+0	0	2+1	0	0+0	0	3+1	0
12	MF	(United States) USA	Eddie Gaven	39	5	28+0	3	2+0	1	3+1	1	2+0	0	2+1	0
13	MF	(France) FRA	Léandre Griffit	9	2	0+3	1	0+0	0	0+1	0	0+0	0	4+1	1
14	DF	(United States) USA	Chad Marshall	32	1	24+0	1	2+0	0	3+0	0	0+0	0	3+0	0
15	MF	(United States) USA	Kevin Burns	19	1	4+5	0	0+2	0	1+1	1	0+1	0	4+1	0
16	MF	(United States) USA	Brian Carroll	38	1	27+1	1	2+0	0	3+0	0	2+0	0	2+1	0
17	MF	(Nigeria) NGR	Emmanuel Ekpo	33	1	13+9	0	2+0	0	3+0	0	1+1	0	3+1	1
18	DF	(United States) USA	Robbie Rogers	26	2	17+3	1	2+0	1	0+0	0	3+1	0	0+0	0
20	FW	(Venezuela) VEN	Emilio Rentería	28	8	9+10	5	0+0	0	1+1	1	0+3	0	2+2	2
22	MF	(Scotland) SCO	Adam Moffat	31	2	23+1	2	0+0	0	1+0	0	2+0	0	4+0	0
23	DF	(United States) USA	Eric Brunner	24	1	13+1	1	1+0	0	2+0	0	2+0	0	4+1	0
25	GK	(United States) USA	Chase Harrison	0	0	0+0	0	0+0	0	0+0	0	0+0	0	0+0	0
29	DF	(Jamaica) JAM	Shaun Francis	23	0	10+2	0	2+0	0	3+0	0	0+0	0	4+2	0
30	GK	(United States) USA	Andy Gruenebaum	12	0	0+0	0	2+0	0	4+0	0	0+0	0	6+0	0
32	FW	(United States) USA	Steven Lenhart	39	11	17+10	6	1+1	0	4+0	2	2+0	2	1+3	1
			Own goal	-0	1	-	1	-	0	-	0	-	0	-	0
Players who left Columbus during the season:
19	MF	(Colombia) COL	Sergio Herrera	1	0	0+1	0	0+0	0	0+0	0	0+0	0	0+0	0
24	DF	(United States) USA	Jed Zayner	10	0	3+5	0	0+0	0	2+0	0	0+0	0	0+0	0
25	GK	(United States) USA	Kenny Schoeni	0	0	0+0	0	0+0	0	0+0	0	0+0	0	0+0	0
28	MF	(United States) USA	Othaniel Yanez	0	0	0+0	0	0+0	0	0+0	0	0+0	0	0+0	0

=== Disciplinary record ===
No.	Pos.	Name	MLS		MLS Playoffs		U.S. Open Cup		2009–10 CONCACAF Champions League		2010–11 CONCACAF Champions League		Total	
No.	Pos.	Name	Yellow card	Red card	Yellow card	Red card	Yellow card	Red card	Yellow card	Red card	Yellow card	Red card	Yellow card	Red card
1	GK	(United States) William Hesmer	3	0	0	0	0	0	0	0	0	0	3	0
2	DF	(United States) Frankie Hejduk	4	1	0	0	0	0	0	0	1	0	0	0
3	DF	(United States) Josh Williams	0	0	0	0	0	0	0	0	0	0	0	0
4	DF	(Argentina) Gino Padula	2	0	0	0	0	0	0	0	1	0	3	0
5	DF	(United States) Danny O'Rourke	2	2	0	0	1	0	0	0	1	0	4	2
6	DF	(England) Andy Iro	2	0	0	0	0	0	0	0	1	0	3	0
7	FW	(Argentina) Guillermo Barros Schelotto	2	0	1	0	1	0	1	0	0	0	5	0
8	DF	(New Zealand) Duncan Oughton	0	0	0	0	0	0	0	0	0	0	0	0
9	FW	(United States) Jason Garey	0	0	0	0	0	0	0	0	1	0	1	0
10	FW	(Peru) Andrés Mendoza	0	0	0	0	0	0	0	0	0	0	0	0
11	MF	(United States) Dilly Duka	1	0	0	0	0	0	0	0	0	0	1	0
12	MF	(United States) Eddie Gaven	0	0	0	0	0	0	0	0	1	0	1	0
13	MF	(France) Léandre Griffit	0	0	0	0	0	0	0	0	0	0	0	0
14	DF	(United States) Chad Marshall	0	0	0	0	0	0	0	0	0	0	0	0
15	MF	(United States) Kevin Burns	1	0	0	0	0	0	0	0	1	0	2	0
16	MF	(United States) Brian Carroll	3	0	2	0	1	0	1	0	0	0	7	0
17	MF	(Nigeria) Emmanuel Ekpo	1	0	1	0	0	0	0	0	0	0	2	0
18	MF	(United States) Robbie Rogers	1	0	1	0	0	0	0	0	0	0	2	0
20	FW	(Venezuela) Emilio Rentería	2	0	0	0	0	0	0	0	2	0	4	0
22	MF	(Scotland) Adam Moffat	8	0	0	0	0	0	0	0	1	0	9	0
23	DF	(United States) Eric Brunner	2	0	0	0	0	0	0	0	0	0	2	0
25	GK	(United States) Chase Harrison	0	0	0	0	0	0	0	0	0	0	0	0
29	DF	(Jamaica) Shaun Francis	3	0	1	0	1	0	0	0	1	0	6	0
30	GK	(United States) Andy Gruenebaum	0	0	0	0	0	0	0	0	1	0	1	0
32	FW	(United States) Steven Lenhart	1	1	0	0	2	0	1	1	1	0	5	2
Players who left Columbus during the season:
19	FW	(United States) Sergio Herrera	0	0	0	0	0	0	0	0	0	0	0	0
24	DF	(United States) Jed Zayner	2	0	0	0	1	0	0	0	0	0	3	0
25	GK	(United States) Kenny Schoeni	0	0	0	0	0	0	0	0	0	0	0	0
28	MF	(United States) Othaniel Yanez	0	0	0	0	0	0	0	0	0	0	0	0

=== Clean sheets ===
No.	Name	MLS	MLS Playoffs	U.S. Open Cup	2009–10 CONCACAF Champions League	2010–11 CONCACAF Champions League	Total	Games Played		
No.	Name	1	(United States) William Hesmer	11	0	0	0	0	11	32
12	(United States) Eddie Gaven	0	0	0	0	0	0	1		
25	(United States) Chase Harrison	0	0	0	0	0	0	0		
30	(United States) Andy Gruenebaum	0	0	1	0	3	4	12		
Players who left Columbus during the season:
25	(United States) Kenny Schoeni	0	0	0	0	0	0	0		

== Transfers ==
=== In ===
Pos.	Player	Transferred from	Fee/notes	Date	Source
MF	(Colombia) Sergio Herrera	(Colombia) Deportivo Cali	Signed via discovery	February 15, 2010	
MF	(United States) Dilly Duka	(United States) Rutgers Scarlet Knights	Drafted in round 1 of the 2010 MLS SuperDraft	March 23, 2010	
DF	(Jamaica) Shaun Francis	(United States) Lindsey Wilson Blue Raiders	Drafted in round 4 of the 2010 MLS SuperDraft	March 23, 2010	
MF	(United States) Othaniel Yanez	(United States) Louisville Cardinals	Drafted in round 4 of the 2010 MLS SuperDraft	March 23, 2010	
MF	(France) Léandre Griffit	(Belgium) UR La Louvière Centre	Signed via discovery	May 13, 2010	
FW	(Peru) Andrés Mendoza	(Turkey) Diyarbakırspor	Signed via discovery	May 13, 2010	
DF	(United States) Josh Williams	(United States) Cleveland Internationals	Signed via discovery	September 15, 2010	
DF	(Chile) Sebastián Miranda	(Chile) Unión Española	Signed via discovery	May 13, 2010	

=== Loans in ===
Pos.	Player	Parent club	Length/Notes	Beginning	End	Source
GK	(United States) Chase Harrison	(United States) MLS Pool	Short term agreement	October 26, 2010	End of Season	

=== Out ===
Pos.	Player	Transferred to	Fee/notes	Date	Source
MF	(United States) Alex Grendi	(United States) Long Island Rough Riders		March 23, 2010	
MF	(United States) Cory Elenio	(United States) Carolina RailHawks		March 23, 2010	
GK	(United States) Kenny Schoeni	Retired		May 17, 2010	
MF	(Colombia) Sergio Herrera	(Venezuela) Deportivo Táchira F.C.		June 28, 2010	
MF	(United States) Othaniel Yanez	(United States) Louisville Lightning		August 2, 2010	
DF	(United States) Jed Zayner	(United States) D.C. United	Traded with a fourth round draft pick in the 2011 MLS SuperDraft for a second round draft pick in the 2012 MLS SuperDraft	August 6, 2010	
FW	(Argentina) Guillermo Barros Schelotto	(Argentina) Gimnasia La Plata	Option declined	November 16, 2010	
DF	(Argentina) Gino Padula	Retired	Option declined	November 16, 2010	
DF	(United States) Frankie Hejduk	(United States) Sporting Kansas City	Option declined; chosen in the 2010 MLS Re-Entry Draft	November 16, 2010	
DF	(New Zealand) Duncan Oughton	Retired	Option declined	November 16, 2010	
MF	(United States) Brian Carroll	(United States) Philadelphia Union	Traded for a second round draft pick in the 2011 MLS SuperDraft and allocation money	November 22, 2010	
DF	(United States) Eric Brunner	(United States) Portland Timbers	Drafted in the second round of the 2010 MLS Expansion Draft	November 24, 2010	
MF	(Scotland) Adam Moffat	(United States) Portland Timbers	Drafted in the third round of the 2010 MLS Expansion Draft	November 24, 2010	
FW	(United States) Jason Garey	(United States) Houston Dynamo	Traded for a fourth round draft pick in the 2015 MLS SuperDraft	December 3, 2010	

=== MLS Draft picks ===
Draft picks are not automatically signed to the team roster. Only those who are signed to a contract will be listed as transfers in. The picks for the Columbus Crew are listed below:

2010 Columbus Crew SuperDraft Picks
Round	Pick	Player	Position	College
1	8	(United States) Dilly Duka	MF	Rutgers
1	12	(Nigeria) Bright Dike	FW	Notre Dame
4	60	(Switzerland) Kwaku Nyamekye	DF	Harvard
4	61	(United States) Othaniel Yanez	MF	Louisville
4	63	(Jamaica) Shaun Francis	DF	Lindsey Wilson College

2010 Columbus Crew Re-Entry Draft Picks
Stage	Round	Pick	Player	Position	Team
1	1	10	(United States) Aaron Hohlbein	DF	Sporting Kansas City
2	1	10	(United States) Jeff Cunningham	FW	FC Dallas

== Awards ==
=== MLS Player of the Week ===
Week	Player	Opponent	Link
9	(Venezuela) Emilio Renteria	New York Red Bulls	

=== MLS Save of the Week ===
Week	Player	Opponent	Link
8	(Argentina) Gino Padula	Chivas USA	
30	(United States) Eddie Gaven	Philadelphia Union	

=== 2010 MLS All-Star Game ===
Starters

- DF Chad Marshall
- FW Guillermo Barros Schelotto

=== Crew Team Awards ===
- Most Valuable Player – Eddie Gaven
- Defensive Player of the Year – Chad Marshall
- Scoring Champion – Guillermo Barros Schelotto
- Man of the Year – Steven Lenhart
- Coach's Award – Andy Iro
- Newcomer of the Year – Shaun Francis
- Goal of the Year – William Hesmer
- Humanitarian of the Year – Jason Garey
- Hardest Working Man of the Year – Steven Lenhart
- Comeback Player of the Year – Andy Gruenebaum
- Fan's Choice – Eddie Gaven
- Jim Nelson Fan of the Year – Herb Bresler
- Academy U15/U16 Player of the Year – Wil Trapp
- Academy U17/U18 Player of the Year – Aaron Horton
- Academy U19/U20 Player of the Year – Brandon Silva
