= 2009 Columbus Crew season =

Columbus Crew
2009 season
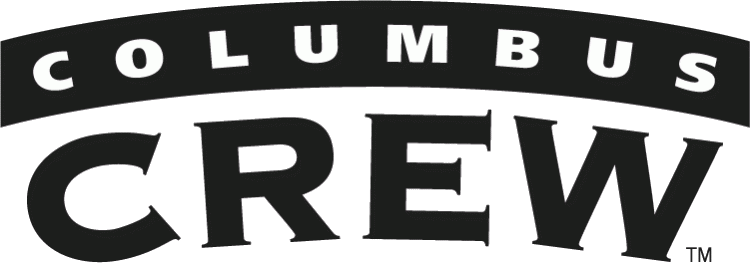
- Investor-operators: Clark Hunt; Dan Hunt; Lamar Hunt Jr. Sharron Hunt Munson; Ron Pizzuti and a group of local investors
- Head Coach: Robert Warzycha
- Stadium: Columbus Crew Stadium
- Major League Soccer: Conference: 1st Overall: 1st
- MLS Cup playoffs: Conference semifinals
- U.S. Open Cup: Third round
- 2009–10 CONCACAF Champions League: Quarterfinals
- Top goalscorer: League: Guillermo Barros Schelotto (12); All: Guillermo Barros Schelotto (14)
- Highest home attendance: 20,966 (9/26 v. LA)
- Lowest home attendance: 5,715 (9/29 v. SAP)
- Average home league attendance: 14,176 (70.4%)
- Biggest win: SJ 0–3 CLB (8/8)
- Biggest defeat: RSL 4–1 CLB (4/2)
| Home colors | Away colors |

The 2009 Columbus Crew season was the club's 14th season of existence and their 14th consecutive season in Major League Soccer, the top flight of soccer in the United States and Canada. The first match of the season was on March 21 against Houston Dynamo. It was the first season under head coach Robert Warzycha.

The Crew won the Supporters' Shield yet again, their third overall and the second time a club had won it consecutively. They were upset in the conference semifinals by eventual MLS Cup winner Real Salt Lake.

== Roster ==
As of match played November 5, 2009

Note: Flags indicate national team as defined under FIFA eligibility rules; some limited exceptions apply. Players may hold more than one non-FIFA nationality.

| No. | Pos. | Nation | Player |
|---|---|---|---|
| 1 | GK | USA | Will Hesmer |
| 2 | DF | USA | Frankie Hejduk (captain) |
| 3 | MF | USA | Alex Grendi (DEV) |
| 4 | DF | ARG | Gino Padula (INT) |
| 5 | MF | USA | Danny O'Rourke |
| 6 | DF | ENG | Andy Iro |
| 7 | FW | ARG | Guillermo Barros Schelotto (INT; DP) |
| 8 | DF | NZL | Duncan Oughton |
| 9 | FW | USA | Jason Garey |
| 10 | FW | VEN | Alejandro Moreno |
| 12 | MF | USA | Eddie Gaven |
| 14 | DF | USA | Chad Marshall |

| No. | Pos. | Nation | Player |
|---|---|---|---|
| 15 | MF | USA | Kevin Burns (DEV) |
| 16 | MF | USA | Brian Carroll |
| 17 | MF | NGA | Emmanuel Ekpo (INT) |
| 19 | MF | USA | Robbie Rogers |
| 20 | FW | VEN | Emilio Rentería (INT) |
| 22 | MF | SCO | Adam Moffat (INT) |
| 23 | DF | USA | Eric Brunner |
| 24 | DF | USA | Jed Zayner (GA; DEV) |
| 25 | GK | USA | Kenny Schoeni |
| 26 | MF | USA | Cory Elenio (DEV) |
| 30 | GK | USA | Andy Gruenebaum |
| 32 | FW | USA | Steven Lenhart |

== Technical Staff ==
| Position | Staff |
|---|---|
| President/General Manager | (United States) Mark McCullers |
| Technical Director | (United States) Brian Bliss |
| Head Coach | (Poland) Robert Warzycha |
| Assistant Coach | (United States) Mike Lapper |
| Assistant Coach | (Russia) Vadim Kirillov |
| Assistant Coach | (Argentina) Ricardo Iribarren |
| Strength and Conditioning Coach | (United States) Steve Tashjian |
| Head Trainer | (United States) Jason Mathews |
| Assistant Trainer | (United States) Skylar Richards |
| Team Manager | (United States) Tucker Walther |
| Equipment Manager | (United States) Rusty Wummel |

Last updated: April 18, 2009
Source: Columbus Crew

== Non-competitive ==
The Crew started preseason in Columbus and played games in Florida, England and Texas before returning to Ohio. The Crew brought in the following trialists during training camp: Ty Shipalane, Jordan Seabrook and Anthony Peters.

Unsigned draft picks Paul Gerstenberger, Alex Grendi and Chris Clements also joined the team for preseason.

=== Preseason ===
| February 10 Friendly | Columbus Crew | 1–2 | D.C. United | Bradenton, FL |
| | Garey 58' | Report | Emilio 22'; Pontius 76' | Stadium: IMG Academy |

| February 12 Friendly | Columbus Crew | 0–2 | Puerto Rico Islanders | Bradenton, FL |
| | Zayner (yellow card) 48'; Peters (yellow card) 78'; Lenhart (yellow card) 85' | Report | Delgado 83'; Nuñez 13' | Stadium: IMG Academy |

| February 14 Friendly | Columbus Crew | 3–1 | U.S. U-20 National Team | Bradenton, FL |
| | Barros Schelotto 37' (pen.); Peters 74'; Lenhart 89' | Report | Shea 83' | Stadium: IMG Academy |

| February 18 Friendly | Columbus Crew | 2–0 | UCF Knights | Bradenton, FL |
| | Ekpo 11'; Carroll 46' | Report | | Stadium: IMG Academy |
Note: Match was 60 minutes

| February 18 Friendly | Columbus Crew | 6–0 | Tampa Spartans | Bradenton, FL |
| | Noonan 8'; Burns 20'; Oughton 44'; Shipalane 52'; Seabrook 57'; Garey 59' | Report | | Stadium: IMG Academy |
Note: Match was 60 minutes

| March 1 Friendly | Everton FC Reserves | 1–5 | Columbus Crew | Liverpool, England |
| | Marshall 13' (o.g.) | Report | Marhsall 9'; Rogers 38', 68'; Barros Schelotto 59'; Marshall 73' |

| March 3 Friendly | Guiseley A.F.C. | Cancelled | Columbus Crew | Liverpool, England |
| | | Report |
Note: Match cancelled due to inclement weather which rendered field unplayable.

| March 5 Friendly | Liverpool FC Reserves | 0–2 | Columbus Crew | Liverpool, England |
| | | Report | Moreno 50'; Barros Schelotto 66' | Stadium: Liverpool Training Centre |

| March 12 Friendly | St. Edward's Hilltoppers | 0–4 | Columbus Crew | Austin, TX |
| | Stewart (red card) 80' | Report | 13' (o.g.); Tom Heinemann 18', 72'; Lenhart (red card) 80'; Clements 90' |

| March 14 Friendly | Austin Aztex FC | 1–0 | Columbus Crew | Austin, TX |
| 8:30 PM EDT | Johnson 25' | Report | Padula (red card) 35' | Stadium: Nelson Field; Attendance: 1,959 |

=== Midseason ===
David Topolski, Geoff Marsh and Patrick Figueiredo were guest players against Marshall Thundering Herd, Geoff Marsh returned as a guest player against Ohio State Buckeyes.

| April 15 Friendly | Marshall Thundering Herd | 3–0 | Columbus Crew | Columbus, OH |
| 9:30 AM EDT | Burns,, | Report | | Stadium: Columbus Crew Stadium |

| May 6 Connor Senn Memorial Game | Ohio State Buckeyes | 1–3 | Columbus Crew | Columbus, OH |
| 7:00 PM EDT | Shrigley 45' | Report | McCarthy 13'; Ekpo 62'; Noonan | Stadium: Jesse Owens Memorial Stadium; Attendance: 2,094 |

== Competitive ==
=== Overview ===
| Competition | First match | Last match | Starting round | Final position | Record | | | | | | | |
| Competition | First match | Last match | Starting round | Final position | Pld | W | D | L | GF | GA | GD | Win % |
|---|---|---|---|---|---|---|---|---|---|---|---|---|
| Major League Soccer | March 21, 2009 | October 25, 2009 | Matchday 1 | Winner | 30 | 13 | 10 | 7 | 41 | 31 | +10 | 43.33 |
| MLS Cup Playoffs | October 31, 2009 | November 5, 2009 | Conference Semifinals | Conference Semifinals | 2 | 0 | 0 | 2 | 2 | 4 | −2 | 0.00 |
| U.S. Open Cup | June 30, 2009 | June 30, 2009 | Third Round | Third Round | 1 | 0 | 1 | 0 | 1 | 1 | +0 | 0.00 |
| CONCACAF Champions League | August 18, 2009 | October 20, 2009 | Group Stage | Quarterfinals | 6 | 2 | 2 | 2 | 5 | 9 | −4 | 33.33 |
| Total | | | | | 39 | 15 | 13 | 11 | 49 | 45 | +4 | 38.46 |

Source: Competitions

=== MLS ===
==== Standings ====
===== Eastern Conference =====
| Pos | Team | Pld | W | L | T | GF | GA | GD | Pts | Qualification |
|---|---|---|---|---|---|---|---|---|---|---|
| 1 | Columbus Crew | 30 | 13 | 7 | 10 | 41 | 31 | +10 | 49 | MLS Cup Playoffs |
| 2 | Chicago Fire | 30 | 11 | 7 | 12 | 39 | 34 | +5 | 45 | MLS Cup Playoffs |
| 3 | New England Revolution | 30 | 11 | 10 | 9 | 33 | 37 | −4 | 42 | MLS Cup Playoffs |
| 4 | D.C. United | 30 | 9 | 8 | 13 | 43 | 44 | −1 | 40 | |
| 5 | Toronto FC | 30 | 10 | 11 | 9 | 37 | 46 | −9 | 39 | |

Source: MLS

===== Overall table =====
| Pos | Team | Pld | W | L | T | GF | GA | GD | Pts | Qualification |
|---|---|---|---|---|---|---|---|---|---|---|
| 1 | Columbus Crew (S) | 30 | 13 | 7 | 10 | 41 | 31 | +10 | 49 | CONCACAF Champions League |
| 2 | LA Galaxy | 30 | 12 | 6 | 12 | 36 | 31 | +5 | 48 | CONCACAF Champions League |
| 3 | Houston Dynamo | 30 | 13 | 8 | 9 | 39 | 29 | +10 | 48 | North American SuperLiga |
| 4 | Seattle Sounders FC | 30 | 12 | 7 | 11 | 38 | 29 | +9 | 47 | CONCACAF Champions League |
| 5 | Chicago Fire | 30 | 11 | 7 | 12 | 39 | 34 | +5 | 45 | North American SuperLiga |

Source: MLS
Rules for classification: 1) points; 2) head-to-head record; 3) goal difference; 4) number of goals scored
(S) Supporters' Shield

==== Results summary ====
| Overall | | | | | | | | Home | | | | | | Away | | | | | |
| Pld | Pts | W | L | T | GF | GA | GD | W | L | T | GF | GA | GD | W | L | T | GF | GA | GD |
|---|---|---|---|---|---|---|---|---|---|---|---|---|---|---|---|---|---|---|---|
| 30 | 49 | 13 | 7 | 10 | 41 | 31 | +10 | 9 | 2 | 4 | 25 | 13 | +12 | 4 | 5 | 6 | 16 | 18 | −2 |

Last updated: October 25, 2009
Source: Major League Soccer
Pld = Matches played; Pts = Points; W = Matches won; T = Matches tied; L = Matches lost; GF = Goals for; GA = Goals against; GD = Goal difference

==== Results by round ====
| Round | 1 | 2 | 3 | 4 | 5 | 6 | 7 | 8 | 9 | 10 | 11 | 12 | 13 | 14 | 15 | 16 | 17 | 18 | 19 | 20 | 21 | 22 | 23 | 24 | 25 | 26 | 27 | 28 | 29 | 30 |
|---|---|---|---|---|---|---|---|---|---|---|---|---|---|---|---|---|---|---|---|---|---|---|---|---|---|---|---|---|---|---|
| Stadium | A | H | A | A | H | H | A | H | A | H | A | A | H | A | H | H | A | H | H | A | A | H | A | H | A | H | H | A | A | H |
| Result | T | T | L | L | T | T | T | W | T | W | T | W | W | L | W | T | T | W | W | W | W | W | L | W | T | W | L | W | L | L |

Updated to match(es) played on October 25, 2009. Source: Columbus Crew
A = Away; H = Home; W = Win; L = Loss; T = Tie

==== Match results ====
| March 21 1 | Houston Dynamo | 1–1 | Columbus Crew | Houston, TX |
| 8:00 PM EDT | Cameron (yellow card) 43'; Ching 53'; Barrett (yellow card) 59' | Report | Barros Schelotto 81'; Gaven (yellow card) 62'; Hejduk (yellow card) 75' | Stadium: Robertson Stadium; Attendance: 16,053; Referee: Tim Weyland; Assistant referees: Paul Scott; Greg Boles; Fourth official: Edvin Jurisevic |

| March 28 2 | Columbus Crew | 1–1 | Toronto FC | Columbus, OH |
| 4:00 PM EDT | Barros Schelotto 30' | Report | Padula 84' (o.g.) | Stadium: Columbus Crew Stadium; Attendance: 14,686; Referee: Michael Kennedy; Assistant referees: Sean Hurd; Peter Balciunas; Fourth official: Hilario Grajeda |

| April 2 3 | Real Salt Lake | 4–1 | Columbus Crew | Sandy, UT |
| 9:00 PM EDT | Findley 2', 29', 62'; Borchers (yellow card) 40'; Beckerman (yellow card) 45', (goal) 67' | Report | Garey 22': Ekpo (yellow card) 45+3'; Rogers (yellow card) 58' | Stadium: Rio Tinto Stadium; Attendance: 11,806; Referee: Alex Prus; Assistant referees: Corey Rockwell; Fabio Tovar; Fourth official: Tyler Ploeger |

| April 5 4 | Chivas USA | 2–1 | Columbus Crew | Carson, CA |
| 8:00 PM EDT | Harris 25'; Lillingston (yellow card) 38', (goal) 50'; Kljestan (yellow card) 67'; Talley (yellow card) 84' | Report | Iro 37', (red card) 67' | Stadium: Home Depot Center; Attendance: 12,827; Referee: Kevin Stott; Assistant referees: Chris Strickland; Peter Manikowski; Fourth official: Jasen Anno |

| April 11 5 | Columbus Crew | 1–1 | Colorado Rapids | Columbus, OH |
| 7:30 PM EDT | Ekpo (yellow card) 29'; Barros Schelotto 41' | Report | Gibbs (yellow card) 26'; Palguta (yellow card) 68'; Casey 82'; Burpo (yellow card) 90+4' | Stadium: Columbus Crew Stadium; Attendance: 7,465; Referee: Edvin Jurisevic; Assistant referees: Corey Rockwell; Rob Fereday; Fourth official: Alex Prus |

| April 25 6 | Columbus Crew | 2–2 | Chicago Fire | Columbus, OH |
| 7:00 PM EDT | Marshall 25'; Moreno 34'; Padula (red card) 57'; Zayner (yellow card) 80' | Report | Pappa (yellow card) 32'; Ward (yellow card) 64'; Thorrington (yellow card) 72'; McBride 86'; Segares 88' | Stadium: Columbus Crew Stadium; Attendance: 16,628; Referee: Jair Marrufo; Assistant referees: Adam Wienckowski; Claudiu Badea; Fourth official: Mikael Lundqvist |

| May 2 7 | Toronto FC | 1–1 | Columbus Crew | Toronto, ON |
| 4:00 PM EDT | Brennan (yellow card) 40'; Barrett (yellow card) 52', (goal) 64' | Report | Barros Schelotto (yellow card) 10'; Ekpo 54'; O'Rourke (yellow card) 57'; Gaven (yellow card) 83' | Stadium: BMO Field; Attendance: 19,998; Referee: Kevin Stott; Assistant referees: Greg Barkey; Philippe Brière; Fourth official: Steven Depiero |

| May 9 8 | Columbus Crew | 3–2 | Kansas City Wizards | Columbus, OH |
| 7:00 PM EDT | Ekpo 38'; Barros Schelotto 55'; Hejduk (yellow card) 68'; Gaven 78'; Gruenebaum (yellow card) 90+1' | Report | Watson (yellow card) 47'; López 51'; Espinoza (yellow card) 67'; Besler (yellow card) 73'; Wolff 79' | Stadium: Columbus Crew Stadium; Attendance: 14,271; Referee: Jorge Gonzalez; Assistant referees: Bill Dittmar; Cyril Madukanya; Fourth official: Chris Penso |

| May 17 9 | Los Angeles Galaxy | 1–1 | Columbus Crew | Carson, CA |
| 3:00 PM EDT | Lewis (yellow card) 32', (goal) 90+1'; Jordan (yellow card) 46' | Report | Rogers (yellow card) 58'; Moreno (yellow card) 62'; Barros Schelotto 70'; O'Rourke (yellow card) 86' (yellow-red card) 89' | Stadium: The Home Depot Center; Attendance: 16,649; Referee: Alex Prus; Assistant referees: Frank Anderson; Héctor Vergara; Fourth official: Mark Geiger |

| May 27 10 | Columbus Crew | 2–1 | San Jose Earthquakes | Columbus, OH |
| 7:30 PM EDT | Gaven 29'; Barros Schelotto 46' | Report | Amarikwa (yellow card) 13'; Johnson 23'; Convey (yellow card) 36'; Corrales (yellow card) 63' | Stadium: Columbus Crew Stadium; Attendance: 8,793; Referee: Abiodun Okulaja; Assistant referees: Craig Lowry; Greg Barkey; Fourth official: Mikael Lundqvist |

| May 30 11 | Seattle Sounders FC | 1–1 | Columbus Crew | Seattle, WA |
| 10:30 PM EDT | Vagenas (yellow card) 37'; Jaqua 58'; Hurtado (yellow card) 68'; Ljungberg (yellow card) 89'; Marshall (red card) 90+2' | Report | Moreno 12'; Barros Schelotto (yellow card) 73' | Stadium: Qwest Field; Attendance: 29,126; Referee: Michael Kennedy; Assistant referees: Emiliano Monje; David Bragg; Fourth official: Alejandro Mariscal |

| June 6 12 | Kansas City Wizards | 0–2 | Columbus Crew | Kansas City, KS |
| 8:30 PM EDT | Arnaud (yellow card) 35'; López (yellow card) 42' | Report | Barros Schelotto 14', 64' (pen.); O'Rourke (yellow card) 17'; Marshall (red card) 51'; Gruenebaum (yellow card) 91' | Stadium: CommunityAmerica Ballpark; Attendance: 10,385; Referee: Baldomero Toledo; Assistant referees: Nate Clement; James Conlee; Fourth official: Andrew Chapin |

| June 14 13 | Columbus Crew | 2–1 | Chivas USA | Columbus, OH |
| 3:00 PM EDT | Carroll (yellow card) 30'; Barros Schelotto 61', 87' | Report | Nagamura (yellow card) 19'; Lillingston 39'; Galindo (yellow card) 57'; Talley (yellow card) 68' | Stadium: Columbus Crew Stadium; Attendance: 12,658; Referee: Steven DePiero; Assistant referees: C.J. Morgante; Kermit Quisenberry; Fourth official: Hilario Grajeda |

| June 20 14 | FC Dallas | 2–1 | Columbus Crew | Frisco, TX |
| 8:30 PM EDT | Moor (yellow card) 32'; Avila 80'; Cooper 87' (pen.) | Report | Ricchetti 14' (o.g.); Padula (yellow card) 41'; Barros Schelotto (yellow card) 68'; Marshall (yellow card) 86' | Stadium: Pizza Hut Park; Attendance: 8,041; Referee: Terry Vaughn; Assistant referees: Paul Scott; Jeff Muschik; Fourth official: Chris Penso |

| June 27 15 | Columbus Crew | 1–0 | New York Red Bulls | Columbus, OH |
| 7:30 PM EDT | Carroll (yellow card) 34'; Marshall 45'; Barros Schelotto (yellow card) 79' | Report | Stammler (yellow card) 76' | Stadium: Columbus Crew Stadium; Attendance: 15,575; Referee: Ricardo Salazar; Assistant referees: Sean Hurd; Steve Taylor; Fourth official: Hilario Grajeda |

| July 4 16 | Columbus Crew | 1–1 | D.C. United | Columbus, OH |
| 7:00 PM EDT | Moreno (yellow card) 12', (goal) 59'; Ekpo (yellow card) 74'; Lenhart (yellow card) 90+2' | Report | Gomez 33'; Olsen (yellow card) 60'; N'Silu (yellow card) 80' | Stadium: Columbus Crew Stadium; Attendance: 14,370; Referee: Baldomero Toledo; Assistant referees: Chris Strickland; Bill Dittmar; Fourth official: Mikael Lundqvist |

| July 11 17 | Chicago Fire | 0–0 | Columbus Crew | Bridgeview, IL |
| 8:00 PM EDT | Ward (yellow card) 52' | Report | Ekpo (yellow card) 33'; Carroll (yellow card) 54'; Gaven (yellow card) 85'; Hejduk (yellow card) 88' | Stadium: Toyota Park; Attendance: 18,123; Referee: Michael Kennedy; Assistant referees: Daniel Belleau; Peter Manikowski; Fourth official: Shane Moody |

| July 18 18 | Columbus Crew | 3–1 | Real Salt Lake | Columbus, OH |
| 8:00 PM EDT | Lenhart 23'; Garey 31', 52'; O'Rourke (yellow card) 72' | Report | Grabavoy (yellow card) 34'; Beltran (yellow card) 45+1'; Russell (yellow card) 65'; Cox (yellow card) 76' | Stadium: Columbus Crew Stadium; Attendance: 12,922; Referee: Hilario Grajeda; Assistant referees: Nate Clement; Rob Fereday; Fourth official: Hilario Grajeda |

| July 25 19 | Columbus Crew | 3–2 | Toronto FC | Columbus, OH |
| 7:30 PM EDT | Carroll (yellow card) 29'; Gaven 32'; Padula (yellow card) 39'; Lenhart 76'; Garey 90+2' | Report | Robinson (yellow card) 27'; De Rosario 35'; Gerba 49' | Stadium: Columbus Crew Stadium; Attendance: 13,775; Referee: Alex Prus; Assistant referees: Sean Hurd; Cyril Madukanya; Fourth official: Mikael Lundqvist |

| August 1 20 | Colorado Rapids | 0–1 | Columbus Crew | Commerce City, CO |
| 9:30 PM EDT | Ihemelu (yellow card) 60' (yellow-red card) 84' | Report | Marshall 39'; Garey (yellow card) 45+2' | Stadium: Dick's Sporting Goods Park; Attendance: 10,851; Referee: Yader Reyes; Assistant referees: Eric Boria; Peter Manikowski; Fourth official: Ben Chouaf |

| August 8 21 | San Jose Earthquakes | 0–3 | Columbus Crew | San Francisco, CA |
| 10:30 PM EDT | Salinas (yellow card) 55' | Report | Lenhart (yellow card) 53'; Carroll (yellow card) 67'; Moreno 69'; Rogers 73'; Moffat 86' | Stadium: Candlestick Park; Referee: Jeff Gontarek; Assistant referees: Frank Anderson; Jeff Hosking; Fourth official: Yader Reyes |

| August 15 22 | Columbus Crew | 2–0 | FC Dallas | Columbus, OH |
| 7:00 PM EDT | Marshall 10'; O'Rourke (yellow card) 66'; Gaven 87' | Report | Benitez (yellow card) 52' | Stadium: Columbus Crew Stadium; Attendance: 19,115; Referee: Edvin Jurisevic; Assistant referees: Sean Hurd; James Conlee; Fourth official: Hilario Grajeda |

| August 30 23 | New York Red Bulls | 1–0 | Columbus Crew | East Rutherford, NJ |
| 6:00 PM EDT | Borman (yellow card) 45+1'; Ubiparipovic (yellow card) 53'; Richards 63'; Johnson (yellow card) 72' | Report | Ekpo (yellow card) 37'; Hejduk (yellow card) 63'; Brunner (yellow card) 83' | Stadium: Giants Stadium; Attendance: 10,323; Referee: Ricardo Salazar; Assistant referees: Greg Barkey; Claudiu Badea; Fourth official: Lee Suckle |

| September 13 24 | Columbus Crew | 2–1 | Houston Dynamo | Columbus, OH |
| 5:00 PM EDT | Hejduk 34'; Moffat (red card) 82'; Gaven 90+1' (pen.) | Report | Weaver 80'; Clark (red card) 82'; Ching (yellow card) 87' | Stadium: Columbus Crew Stadium; Attendance: 14,306; Referee: Jorge Gonzalez; Assistant referees: Jason Cullum; James Conlee; Fourth official: Mikael Lundqvist |

| September 20 25 | Chicago Fire | 2–2 | Columbus Crew | Bridgeview, IL |
| 3:00 PM EDT | Lowry 6', 35'; Mapp (yellow card) 70' | Report | Padula (yellow card) 7'; Barros Schelotto 55', 78' (pen.) | Stadium: Toyota Park; Attendance: 16,549; Referee: Mark Geiger; Assistant referees: Thomas Supple; Claudiu Badea; Fourth official: Victor Herrera |

| September 26 26 | Columbus Crew | 2–0 | Los Angeles Galaxy | Columbus, OH |
| 7:30 PM EDT | Hejduk (yellow card) 28'; Gaven 33'; Lenhart 59', (yellow card) 75'; Brunner (yellow card) 62'; Moreno (yellow card) 69' | Report | Kirovski (yellow card) 56'; Birchall (yellow card) 71'; Berhalter (yellow card) 73'; Gordon (yellow card) 90+3' | Stadium: Columbus Crew Stadium; Attendance: 20,966; Referee: Terry Vaughn; Assistant referees: Rob Fereday; Cyril Madukanya; Fourth official: Niko Bratsis |

| October 3 27 | Columbus Crew | 0–1 | Seattle Sounders FC | Columbus, OH |
| 7:30 PM EDT | Moreno (yellow card) 55'; O'Rourke (yellow card) 65'; Lenhart (yellow card) 90+5' | Report | Levesque 36'; Marshall (yellow card) 84' | Stadium: Columbus Crew Stadium; Attendance: 14,372; Referee: Ricardo Salazar; Assistant referees: C.J. Morgante; Rob Fereday; Fourth official: Mikael Lundqvist |

| October 10 28 | New England Revolution | 0–1 | Columbus Crew | Foxborough, MA |
| 7:30 PM EDT | Osei (yellow card) 7'; Joseph (yellow card) 38'; Dube (yellow card) 45' | Report | Padula 36'; Burns (yellow card) 45+1'; Brunner (yellow card) 50'; Ekpo (red card) 65'; Zayner (yellow card) 90+3' | Stadium: Gillette Stadium; Attendance: 13,297; Referee: Paul Ward; Assistant referees: Philippe Brière; Claudiu Badea; Fourth official: Jeff Gontarek |

| October 17 29 | D.C. United | 1–0 | Columbus Crew | Washington, D.C. |
| 8:00 PM EDT | McTavish (yellow card) 6'; Emilio 17' | Report | Renteria (red card) 83' | Stadium: Robert F. Kennedy Memorial Stadium; Attendance: 16,274; Referee: Alex Prus; Assistant referees: Sean Hurd; Adam Wienckowski; Fourth official: Andrew Chapin |

| October 25 30 | Columbus Crew | 0–1 | New England Revolution | Columbus, OH |
| 5:00 PM EDT | Iro (yellow card) 60'; Zayner (yellow card) 63'; Padula (yellow card) 81'; Moffat (yellow card) 88' | Report | Heaps (yellow card) 55'; Larentowicz 79' | Stadium: Columbus Crew Stadium; Attendance: 16,797; Referee: Kevin Stott; Assistant referees: Bill Dittmar; Jeff Muschik; Fourth official: Terry Vaughn |

=== MLS playoffs ===
==== Conference Semifinals ====
| October 31 Leg 1 | Real Salt Lake | 1–0 | Columbus Crew | Sandy, UT |
| 6:30 PM EDT | Beckerman (yellow card) 38'; Findley 88' | Report | Carroll (yellow card) 19' | Stadium: Rio Tinto Stadium; Attendance: 11,499; Referee: Mark Geiger; Assistant referees: Chris Strickland; Bill Dittmar; Fourth official: Ramon Hernandez |

| November 5 Leg 2 | Columbus Crew | 2–3 (2–4 agg.) | Real Salt Lake | Columbus, OH |
| 9:00 PM EST | Barros Schelotto 19', 35'; O'Rourke (yellow card) 48'; Moreno (yellow card) 59' | Report | Morales 37'; Findley 45+2' (pen.); Williams 74'; Olave (yellow card) 68' | Stadium: Columbus Crew Stadium; Attendance: 10,109; Referee: Baldomero Toledo; Assistant referees: Thomas Supple; Joe Fletcher; Fourth official: Silviu Petrescu |

=== CONCACAF Champions League ===
| Team | Pld | W | D | L | GF | GA | GD | Pts |
|---|---|---|---|---|---|---|---|---|
| (Mexico) Cruz Azul | 6 | 5 | 1 | 0 | 16 | 4 | +12 | 16 |
| (United States) Columbus Crew | 6 | 2 | 2 | 2 | 5 | 9 | −4 | 8 |
| (Costa Rica) Saprissa | 6 | 1 | 2 | 3 | 6 | 8 | −2 | 5 |
| Puerto Rico Islanders | 6 | 0 | 3 | 3 | 6 | 12 | −6 | 3 |

| August 18 Group Stage | Columbus Crew (United States) | 2–0 | Puerto Rico Islanders | Columbus, OH |
| 8:00 PM EDT | Lenhart 58'; Rogers 79' | Report | Arrieta (yellow card) 17'; Addlery (yellow card) 19'; Gaudette (yellow card) 29' | Stadium: Columbus Crew Stadium; Attendance: 6,161; Referee: Roberto Moreno (Panama); Assistant referees: Daniel Williamson (Panama); Benigno Paneso (Panama); Fourth official: Alex Prus (United States) |

| August 26 Group Stage | Cruz Azul (Mexico) | 5–0 | (United States) Columbus Crew | Mexico City, Mexico |
| 10:00 PM EDT | Lozano 4', 82' (pen.), 87'; Núñez 9'; Cervantes (yellow card) 40'; Villa (yellow card) 44'; Marshall 47' (o.g.); Riveros (yellow card) 87' | Report | Brunner (yellow card) 36' (yellow-red card) 38'; Hejduk (yellow card) 80' | Stadium: Estadio Azul; Attendance: 2,669; Referee: Óscar Moncada (Honduras); Assistant referees: Rafael Garcia (Honduras); Oscar Velásquez (Honduras); Fourth official: Francisco Chacón (Mexico) |

| September 16 Group Stage | Deportivo Saprissa (Costa Rica) | 0–1 | (United States) Columbus Crew | San José, Costa Rica |
| 10:00 PM EDT | Centeno (yellow card) 90' | Report | Gaven 5'; Lenhart (yellow card) 18'; Hesmer (yellow card) 56'; Oughton (yellow card) 71'; Rogers (yellow card) 89' | Stadium: Estadio Ricardo Saprissa Aymá; Attendance: 5,600; Referee: Roberto Garcia (Mexico); Assistant referees: Arturo Velasquez (Mexico); Salvador Rodríguez (Mexico); Fourth official: Jeffrey Solis (Costa Rica) |

| September 23 Group Stage | Columbus Crew (United States) | 0–2 | (Mexico) Cruz Azul | Columbus, OH |
| 8:00 PM EDT | Lenhart (yellow card) 34'; Barros Schelotto (yellow card) 71' | Report | Zeballos 14'; Vela 39'; Gutiérrez (yellow card) 85' | Stadium: Columbus Crew Stadium; Attendance: 7,921; Referee: Geoffrey Hospedales (Trinidad and Tobago); Assistant referees: Joseph Taylor (Trinidad and Tobago); Lyndon Burton (Trinidad and Tobago); Fourth official: Jair Marrufo (United States) |

| September 29 Group Stage | Columbus Crew (United States) | 1–1 | (Costa Rica) Deportivo Saprissa | Columbus, OH |
| 8:00 PM EDT | Rogers 26' (pen.); Moffat (yellow card) 59'; Padula (yellow card) 63'; Moreno (yellow card) 80'; Ekpo (yellow card) 90' | Report | Centeno (yellow card) 24'; Cordero (yellow card) 88'; Robinson 90+2' | Stadium: Columbus Crew Stadium; Attendance: 5,715; Referee: Mauricio Morales (Mexico); Assistant referees: Juan Rangel (Mexico); Alejandro Ayala (Mexico); Fourth official: Terry Vaughn (United States) |

| October 20 Group Stage | Puerto Rico Islanders | 1–1 | (United States) Columbus Crew | Bayamón, PR |
| 8:00 PM EDT | Arrieta (yellow card) 32'; Delgado 34' | Report | Burns (yellow card) 33'; Rentería 74'; Barros Schelotto (yellow card) 89' | Stadium: Estadio Juan Ramón Loubriel; Referee: Elmer Bonilla (El Salvador); Assistant referees: Hector Recinos (El Salvador); Douglas Bermudez (El Salvador); Fourth official: Jesús Ángel Lebrón (Puerto Rico) |

=== U.S. Open Cup ===
| June 30 Third Round | Columbus Crew (MLS) (Ohio) | 1–1 (a.e.t.) (3–5 p) | (New York (state)) Rochester Rhinos (USL-1) | Rochester, NY |
| 7:00 PM EDT | Grendi (yellow card) 30' (yellow-red card) 55'; Oughton 37'; Elenio (yellow card) 85' | Report | Harden 31'; Ambersley (yellow card) 34'; Menyongar (yellow card) 48'; Nurse (yellow card) 103' | Stadium: Marina Auto Stadium; Attendance: 6,098; Referee: Shane Moody |
| | Penalties |
| | Ekpo (penalty scored); Moreno (penalty scored); Oughton (penalty missed); Garey (penalty scored) | | (penalty scored) Kenton; (penalty scored) Salles; (penalty scored) Gregor; (penalty scored) Bertz; (penalty scored) Heins |

== Statistics ==
=== Appearances and goals ===
Under "Apps" for each section, the first number represents the number of starts, and the second number represents appearances as a substitute.

| No. | Pos | Nat | Player | Total | | MLS | | MLS Cup Playoffs | | U.S. Open Cup | | CONCACAF Champions League | |
| No. | Pos | Nat | Player | Apps | Goals | Apps | Goals | Apps | Goals | Apps | Goals | Apps | Goals |
|---|---|---|---|---|---|---|---|---|---|---|---|---|---|
| 1 | GK | (United States) USA | William Hesmer | 27 | 0 | 19+0 | 0 | 2+0 | 0 | 0+0 | 0 | 6+0 | 0 |
| 2 | DF | (United States) USA | Frankie Hejduk | 19 | 1 | 14+0 | 1 | 2+0 | 0 | 0+0 | 0 | 3+0 | 0 |
| 3 | MF | (United States) USA | Alex Grendi | 4 | 0 | 1+2 | 0 | 0+0 | 0 | 1+0 | 0 | 0+0 | 0 |
| 4 | DF | (Argentina) ARG | Gino Padula | 34 | 1 | 27+0 | 1 | 2+0 | 0 | 0+0 | 0 | 5+0 | 0 |
| 5 | DF | (United States) USA | Danny O'Rourke | 33 | 0 | 26+0 | 0 | 2+0 | 0 | 0+0 | 0 | 5+0 | 0 |
| 6 | DF | (England) ENG | Andy Iro | 14 | 1 | 8+3 | 1 | 0+0 | 0 | 1+0 | 0 | 2+0 | 0 |
| 7 | FW | (Argentina) ARG | Guillermo Barros Schelotto | 30 | 14 | 21+3 | 12 | 1+0 | 2 | 0+0 | 0 | 5+0 | 0 |
| 8 | DF | (New Zealand) NZL | Duncan Oughton | 12 | 1 | 2+7 | 0 | 0+0 | 0 | 1+0 | 1 | 2+0 | 0 |
| 9 | FW | (United States) USA | Jason Garey | 19 | 4 | 8+7 | 4 | 0+2 | 0 | 1+0 | 0 | 1+0 | 0 |
| 10 | FW | (Venezuela) VEN | Alejandro Moreno | 29 | 4 | 17+5 | 4 | 1+0 | 0 | 0+1 | 0 | 5+0 | 0 |
| 12 | MF | (United States) USA | Eddie Gaven | 38 | 7 | 27+3 | 6 | 2+0 | 0 | 0+0 | 0 | 4+2 | 1 |
| 14 | DF | (United States) USA | Chad Marshall | 22 | 4 | 18+0 | 4 | 2+0 | 0 | 0+0 | 0 | 2+0 | 0 |
| 15 | MF | (United States) USA | Kevin Burns | 11 | 0 | 4+4 | 0 | 0+0 | 0 | 1+0 | 0 | 1+1 | 0 |
| 16 | MF | (United States) USA | Brian Carroll | 33 | 0 | 26+0 | 0 | 2+0 | 0 | 0+0 | 0 | 5+0 | 0 |
| 17 | MF | (Nigeria) NGA | Emmanuel Ekpo | 37 | 2 | 22+6 | 2 | 1+1 | 0 | 0+1 | 0 | 4+2 | 0 |
| 19 | DF | (United States) USA | Robbie Rogers | 29 | 3 | 20+2 | 1 | 1+1 | 0 | 0+0 | 0 | 4+1 | 2 |
| 20 | FW | (Venezuela) VEN | Emilio Rentería | 8 | 1 | 2+3 | 0 | 1+0 | 0 | 0+0 | 0 | 0+2 | 1 |
| 22 | MF | (Scotland) SCO | Adam Moffat | 17 | 1 | 6+6 | 1 | 0+0 | 0 | 0+0 | 0 | 3+2 | 0 |
| 23 | DF | (United States) USA | Eric Brunner | 33 | 1 | 23+2 | 1 | 2+0 | 0 | 1+0 | 0 | 5+0 | 0 |
| 24 | DF | (United States) USA | Jed Zayner | 23 | 0 | 16+4 | 0 | 0+0 | 0 | 1+0 | 0 | 2+0 | 0 |
| 25 | GK | (United States) USA | Kenny Schoeni | 1 | 0 | 1+0 | 0 | 0+0 | 0 | 0+0 | 0 | 0+0 | 0 |
| 26 | MF | (United States) USA | Cory Elenio | 2 | 0 | 0+1 | 0 | 0+0 | 0 | 1+0 | 0 | 0+0 | 0 |
| 30 | GK | (United States) USA | Andy Gruenebaum | 11 | 0 | 10+0 | 0 | 0+0 | 0 | 1+0 | 0 | 0+0 | 0 |
| 32 | FW | (United States) USA | Steven Lenhart | 33 | 4 | 10+16 | 3 | 1+1 | 0 | 1+0 | 0 | 2+2 | 1 |
| | | | Own goal | 0 | 1 | - | 1 | - | 0 | - | 0 | - | 0 |
Players who left Columbus during the season:
| 11 | FW | (United States) USA | Pat Noonan | 5 | 0 | 2+3 | 0 | 0+0 | 0 | 0+0 | 0 | 0+0 | 0 |
| 37 | MF | (Zimbabwe) ZIM | Stanley Nyazamba | 1 | 0 | 0+0 | 0 | 0+0 | 0 | 1+0 | 0 | 0+0 | 0 |

=== Disciplinary record ===
| No. | Pos. | Name | MLS | | MLS Playoffs | | U.S. Open Cup | | CONCACAF Champions League | | Total | |
| No. | Pos. | Name | Booked | Sent off (straight red) | Booked | Sent off (straight red) | Booked | Sent off (straight red) | Booked | Sent off (straight red) | Booked | Sent off (straight red) |
|---|---|---|---|---|---|---|---|---|---|---|---|---|
| 1 | GK | (United States) William Hesmer | 1 | 0 | 0 | 0 | 0 | 0 | 1 | 0 | 2 | 0 |
| 2 | DF | (United States) Frankie Hejduk | 5 | 0 | 0 | 0 | 0 | 0 | 1 | 0 | 6 | 0 |
| 3 | MF | (United States) Alex Grendi | 0 | 0 | 0 | 0 | 2 | 1 | 0 | 0 | 2 | 1 |
| 4 | DF | (Argentina) Gino Padula | 4 | 1 | 0 | 0 | 0 | 0 | 1 | 0 | 5 | 1 |
| 5 | DF | (United States) Danny O'Rourke | 6 | 1 | 1 | 0 | 0 | 0 | 0 | 0 | 7 | 1 |
| 6 | DF | (England) Andy Iro | 1 | 1 | 0 | 0 | 0 | 0 | 0 | 0 | 1 | 1 |
| 7 | FW | (Argentina) Guillermo Barros Schelotto | 4 | 0 | 0 | 0 | 0 | 0 | 2 | 0 | 6 | 0 |
| 8 | DF | (New Zealand) Duncan Oughton | 0 | 0 | 0 | 0 | 0 | 0 | 1 | 0 | 1 | 0 |
| 9 | FW | (United States) Jason Garey | 1 | 0 | 0 | 0 | 0 | 0 | 0 | 0 | 1 | 0 |
| 10 | FW | (Venezuela) Alejandro Moreno | 4 | 1 | 0 | 0 | 0 | 0 | 1 | 0 | 6 | 0 |
| 12 | MF | (United States) Eddie Gaven | 3 | 0 | 0 | 0 | 0 | 0 | 0 | 0 | 3 | 0 |
| 14 | DF | (United States) Chad Marshall | 1 | 1 | 0 | 0 | 0 | 0 | 0 | 0 | 1 | 1 |
| 15 | MF | (United States) Kevin Burns | 1 | 0 | 0 | 0 | 0 | 0 | 1 | 0 | 2 | 0 |
| 16 | MF | (United States) Brian Carroll | 5 | 0 | 1 | 0 | 0 | 0 | 0 | 0 | 6 | 0 |
| 17 | MF | (Nigeria) Emmanuel Ekpo | 6 | 1 | 0 | 0 | 0 | 0 | 1 | 0 | 7 | 1 |
| 19 | MF | (United States) Robbie Rogers | 2 | 0 | 0 | 0 | 0 | 0 | 1 | 0 | 3 | 0 |
| 20 | FW | (Venezuela) Emilio Rentería | 0 | 1 | 0 | 0 | 0 | 0 | 0 | 0 | 0 | 1 |
| 22 | MF | (Scotland) Adam Moffat | 1 | 1 | 0 | 0 | 0 | 0 | 1 | 0 | 2 | 1 |
| 23 | DF | (United States) Eric Brunner | 3 | 0 | 0 | 0 | 0 | 0 | 2 | 1 | 5 | 1 |
| 24 | DF | (United States) Jed Zayner | 3 | 0 | 0 | 0 | 0 | 0 | 0 | 0 | 3 | 0 |
| 25 | GK | (United States) Kenny Schoeni | 0 | 0 | 0 | 0 | 0 | 0 | 0 | 0 | 0 | 0 |
| 26 | MF | (United States) Cory Elenio | 0 | 0 | 0 | 0 | 1 | 0 | 0 | 0 | 1 | 0 |
| 30 | GK | (United States) Andy Gruenebaum | 2 | 0 | 0 | 0 | 0 | 0 | 0 | 0 | 2 | 0 |
| 32 | FW | (United States) Steven Lenhart | 4 | 0 | 0 | 0 | 0 | 0 | 2 | 0 | 6 | 0 |
Players who left Columbus during the season:
| 11 | FW | (United States) Pat Noonan | 0 | 0 | 0 | 0 | 0 | 0 | 0 | 0 | 0 | 0 |
| 37 | MF | (Zimbabwe) Stanley Nyazamba | 0 | 0 | 0 | 0 | 0 | 0 | 0 | 0 | 0 | 0 |

=== Clean sheets ===
| No. | Name | MLS | MLS Playoffs | U.S. Open Cup | CONCACAF Champions League | Total | Games Played | | |
|---|---|---|---|---|---|---|---|---|---|
| No. | Name | 1 | (United States) William Hesmer | 7 | 0 | 0 | 2 | 9 | 27 |
| 25 | (United States) Kenny Schoeni | 0 | 0 | 0 | 0 | 0 | 1 | | |
| 30 | (United States) Andy Gruenebaum | 1 | 0 | 0 | 0 | 1 | 11 | | |

== Transfers ==
=== In ===
| Pos. | Player | Transferred from | Fee/notes | Date | Source |
|---|---|---|---|---|---|
| MF | (United States) Alex Grendi | (United States) Penn Quakers | Drafted in round 2 of the 2009 MLS SuperDraft. Signed to a developmental contract. | March 13, 2009 | |
| DF | (United States) Eric Brunner | (United States) New York Red Bulls | Traded for a second round draft pick in the 2011 MLS SuperDraft | March 18, 2009 | |
| MF | (United States) Kevin Burns | (United States) Columbus Crew | Signed to a developmental contract. | April 2, 2009 | |
| FW | (Venezuela) Emilio Renteria | (Venezuela) Caracas F.C. | | August 19, 2009 | |
| GK | (United States) Kenny Schoeni | (United States) Miami FC | | September 18, 2009 | |

=== Out ===
| Pos. | Player | Transferred to | Fee/notes | Date | Source |
|---|---|---|---|---|---|
| DF | (Saint Vincent and the Grenadines) Ezra Hendrickson | Retired | | January 8, 2009 | |
| MF | (Brazil) Stefani Miglioranzi | (United States) Los Angeles Galaxy | Traded for a fourth round draft pick in the 2010 MLS SuperDraft | January 9, 2009 | |
| GK | (United States) Kenny Schoeni | (United States) Miami FC | Placed on waivers | April 2, 2009 | |
| FW | (United States) Pat Noonan | (United States) Columbus Crew | Traded for a first round draft pick in the 2010 MLS SuperDraft | June 15, 2009 | |
| MF | (Zimbabwe) Stanley Nyazamba | (United States) FC Tampa Bay | Released | July 10, 2009 | |
| FW | (Venezuela) Alejandro Moreno | (United States) Philadelphia Union | Drafted in the 2009 MLS Expansion Draft | November 25, 2009 | |

=== MLS Draft picks ===
Draft picks are not automatically signed to the team roster. Only those who are signed to a contract will be listed as transfers in. The picks for the Columbus Crew are listed below:

2009 Columbus Crew SuperDraft Picks
| Round | Pick | Player | Position | College |
| 2 | 30 | (United States) Paul Gerstenberger | DF | Boston College |
| 3 | 45 | (United States) Alex Grendi | MF | Penn |
| 4 | 60 | (United States) Chris Clements | DF | Tulsa |

== Awards ==
=== MLS Player of the Week ===
| Week | Player | Opponent | Link |
|---|---|---|---|
| 13 | (Argentina) Guillermo Barros Schelotto | Chivas USA | |
| 22 | (United States) Chad Marshall | FC Dallas | |

=== MLS Player of the Month ===
| Month | Player | Stats | Link |
|---|---|---|---|
| June | (Argentina) Guillermo Barros Schelotto | 2 assists, 4 goals | |
| August | (United States) Chad Marshall | 2 goals, 3 shutouts | |

=== 2009 MLS All-Star Game ===
Starters

- DF Frankie Hejduk
- FW Guillermo Barros Schelotto

=== Postseason ===
MLS Defender of the Year

- DF Chad Marshall

MLS Best XI

- DF Chad Marshall

=== Crew Team Awards ===
- Most Valuable Player – Danny O'Rourke
- Defensive Player of the Year – Chad Marshall
- Scoring Champion – Guillermo Barros Schelotto
- Man of the Year – Brian Carroll
- Coach's Award – Eddie Gaven
- Newcomer of the Year – Eric Brunner
- Goal of the Year – Adam Moffat
- Humanitarian of the Year – Steven Lenhart
- Hardest Working Man of the Year – Gino Padula
- Comeback Player of the Year – Adam Moffat
- Fan's Choice – Eddie Gaven
- Jim Nelson Fan of the Year – Rick Thomas
- Academy U16 Player of the Year – Wil Trapp
- Academy U18 Player of the Year – Matt Wiet
