= Andy Iro =

English footballer (born 1984)

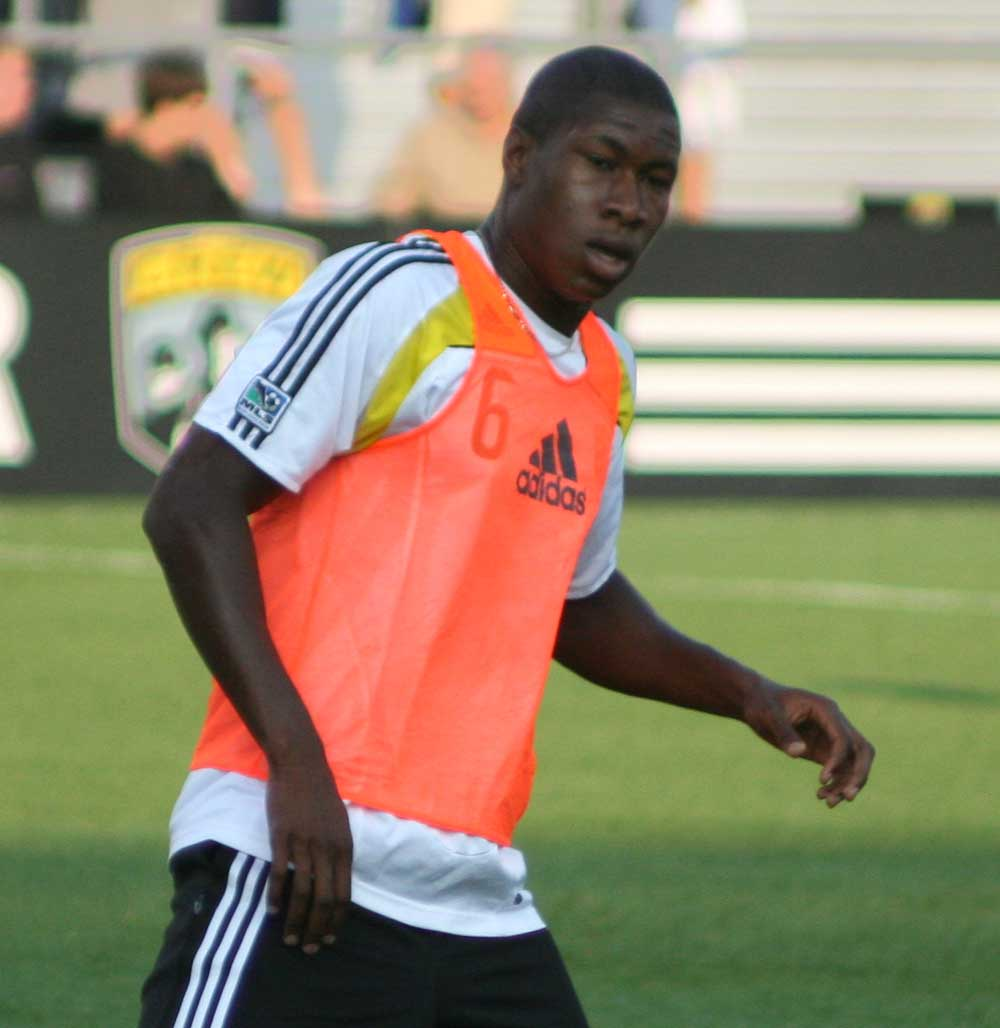
- Iro preparing for his first MLS game, 29 March 2008

Personal information
- Full name: Andy Iro
- Date of birth: 26 November 1984 (age 41)
- Place of birth: Liverpool, England
- Height: 6 ft 4 in (1.93 m)
- Position: Defender

Youth career
- Kingsley United
- St. Edwards

College career
Years	Team	Apps	(Gls)
2004–2007	UC Santa Barbara Gauchos	86	(10)

Senior career*
Years	Team	Apps	(Gls)
2008–2011	Columbus Crew	58	(5)
2011	Toronto FC	13	(0)
2012–2013	Stevenage	0	(0)
2012–2013	→ Barnet (loan)	9	(1)
Total		80	(6)
- * Club domestic league appearances and goals

Andy Iro (born 26 November 1984) is an English former professional footballer who played primarily as a defender.

Iro played college soccer for the UC Santa Barbara Gauchos men's soccer team, where he was named the Most Outstanding Player (Defensive) for the 2006 NCAA Division I Men's Soccer Championship en route to winning the national championship. He was drafted by Major League Soccer side Columbus Crew with the sixth overall pick in the 2008 MLS SuperDraft. He spent four seasons in MLS, joining Toronto FC for part of his last season, before playing in England with Stevenage F.C. and Barnet F.C. from 2012 to 2013.

== Early life and education ==
Iro was born on 26 November 1984 in Liverpool, England. His parents, Paul and Rose, both immigrated from Nigeria, eventually settling in the Toxteth area of Liverpool. He played youth football for Kingsley United. He attended St. Edwards, where he competed on the school's rugby, and track teams. He trialed with Everton, but ultimately proved unsuccessful.

At the age of 17, Iro founded and operated a local grocery with a $1,000 initial loan from his mother, Rose. He ran the store until he was 19 years old, doing brisk business until an attempted robbery resulted in Iro getting shot in the thigh. Iro had a relative run the business while he bounced between jobs and unemployment, eventually connecting with the University of California, Santa Barbara for an athletic scholarship.

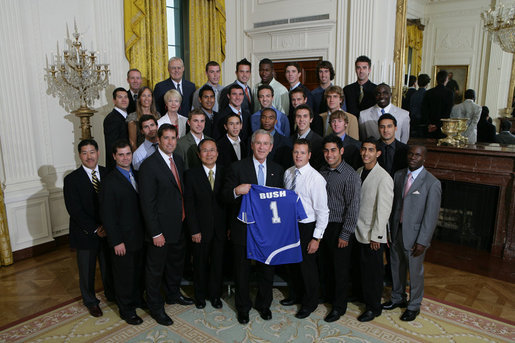
Iro and the 2006 UCSB Gauchos soccer team honored at the White House.

Iro was a student-athlete for the UC Santa Barbara Gauchos men's soccer team and started as a freshman as the team went to the championship match of the 2004 NCAA Division I Men's Soccer Championship. Iro and UCSB were victorious in the 2006 NCAA Division I Men's Soccer Championship just two years later with Iro being named the College Cup's Most Outstanding Player (Defensive). For his career, Iro made 86 appearances, all starts, for the Gauchos and added 10 goals and 4 assists. He was a four-time All-Big West Conference First Team selection and was named as back-to-back-to-back Big West Defensive Player of the Year.

== Career ==
=== Columbus Crew ===
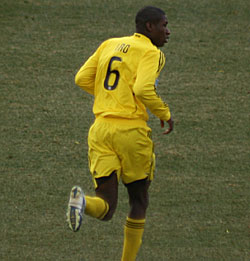
Iro making his professional debut with Columbus Crew, 29 March 2008.

Despite being thought of as the possible top pick, Iro was drafted sixth overall in the 2008 MLS SuperDraft by Columbus Crew after coach Sigi Schmid was convinced Iro would remain in the United States to play. Iro made his professional debut on 28 March 2008, coming on as an 89th-minute substitute in the Crew's first game of the 2008 Major League Soccer season against Toronto FC. He would score his first MLS goal on 6 September 2008 against New England Revolution, heading in a Guillermo Barros Schelotto free kick. Iro and the Crew would win both the 2008 Supporters' Shield and MLS Cup 2008.

In the 2009 Major League Soccer season, Iro and the Crew again dominated the competition, resulting in their second consecutive Supporters' Shield. As a result of their accomplishments from the previous year, Iro also saw his first continental action in the 2009–10 CONCACAF Champions League.

Iro began to take more of a leadership role in the Crew's 2010 Major League Soccer season and 2011 Major League Soccer season, which saw the club compete in the 2009–10 CONCACAF Champions League with Iro wearing the captain's armband on occasion. During his time with the club, Iro made 58 league appearances and scored five goals, but had grown disgruntled during the 2011 preseason and his contract was expiring after the season.

=== Toronto FC ===
With Iro's inexplicably falling out of favor in addition to his looming contract situation, Columbus Crew traded him along with teammate Léandre Griffit in July 2011 to Toronto FC for Tony Tchani. He made his debut on 20 July 2011 against FC Dallas. He would appear for Toronto in 13 league games in addition to work in the 2011–12 CONCACAF Champions League. At the end of the season, Iro and Toronto could not agree on a new contract and he left the club.

=== England ===
Following his departure from Toronto, Iro signed with Football League One side Stevenage F.C. in September 2012. The move meant Iro would be playing under Gary Smith, a former Major League Soccer manager for Colorado Rapids, whom he had known during his time playing in the United States.

In November 2012, having failed to make a first-team appearance for Stevenage, Iro joined Football League Two side Barnet F.C. on loan until January 2013. The loan at Barnet was extended until 9 February. Iro made 9 league appearances for Barnet, scoring once, before returning to Stevenage.

Iro returned to Stevenage in February 2013 but did not appear in any first-team games for the club.

== Personal life ==
Following his professional soccer career, Iro worked in operations for Uber in Santa Barbara, California. He also trained youth soccer players in the local area and ran Next Step Academy, which placed a focus on academics.

He is a fan of Newcastle United.

== Awards and honours ==
UC Santa Barbara

- NCAA Men's Division I Soccer Championship (1): 2006

Columbus Crew

- Major League Soccer MLS Cup (1): 2008
- Major League Soccer Supporter's Shield (2): 2008, 2009

Individual

- 2006 First Team All-American (College Soccer News)
- 2006 College Cup Most Outstanding Defensive Player
- 2006 Big West Defensive Player of the Year
- 2004 Big West Defensive Player of the Year
- 2004 Freshman All-American (Soccer America)
- 2004 First Team All-American (College Soccer News)
- 2004 College Cup All-Tournament
- 2004 Big West Freshman of the Year

== Career statistics ==
Appearances and goals by club, season and competition
Club	Season	League			Playoffs (Note: All appearances in the MLS Cup Playoffs)		Domestic Cup (Note: All appearances in the U.S. Open Cup)		League Cup		Continental (Note: All appearances in the CONCACAF Champions League)		Total	
Club	Season	Division	Apps	Goals	Apps	Goals	Apps	Goals	Apps	Goals	Apps	Goals	Apps	Goals
Columbus Crew	2008	MLS	18	1	3	0	1	0	–		–		22	1
Columbus Crew	2009	MLS	11	1	0	0	1	0	–		2	0	14	1
Columbus Crew	2010	MLS	25	3	1	0	3	1	–		7	1	36	5
Columbus Crew	2011	MLS	4	0	0	0	1	0	–		2	0	7	0
Columbus Crew	Total		58	5	4	0	6	1	0	0	11	1	79	7
Toronto FC	2011	MLS	13	0	–		0	0	–		7	0	20	0
Stevenage	2012–13	League One	0	0	–		0	0	0	0	–		0	0
Barnet (loan)	2012–13	League Two	9	1	–		0	0	0	0	–		9	1
Career total			80	6	4	0	6	1	0	0	18	1	108	8
