= Léandre Griffit =

French footballer (born 1984)

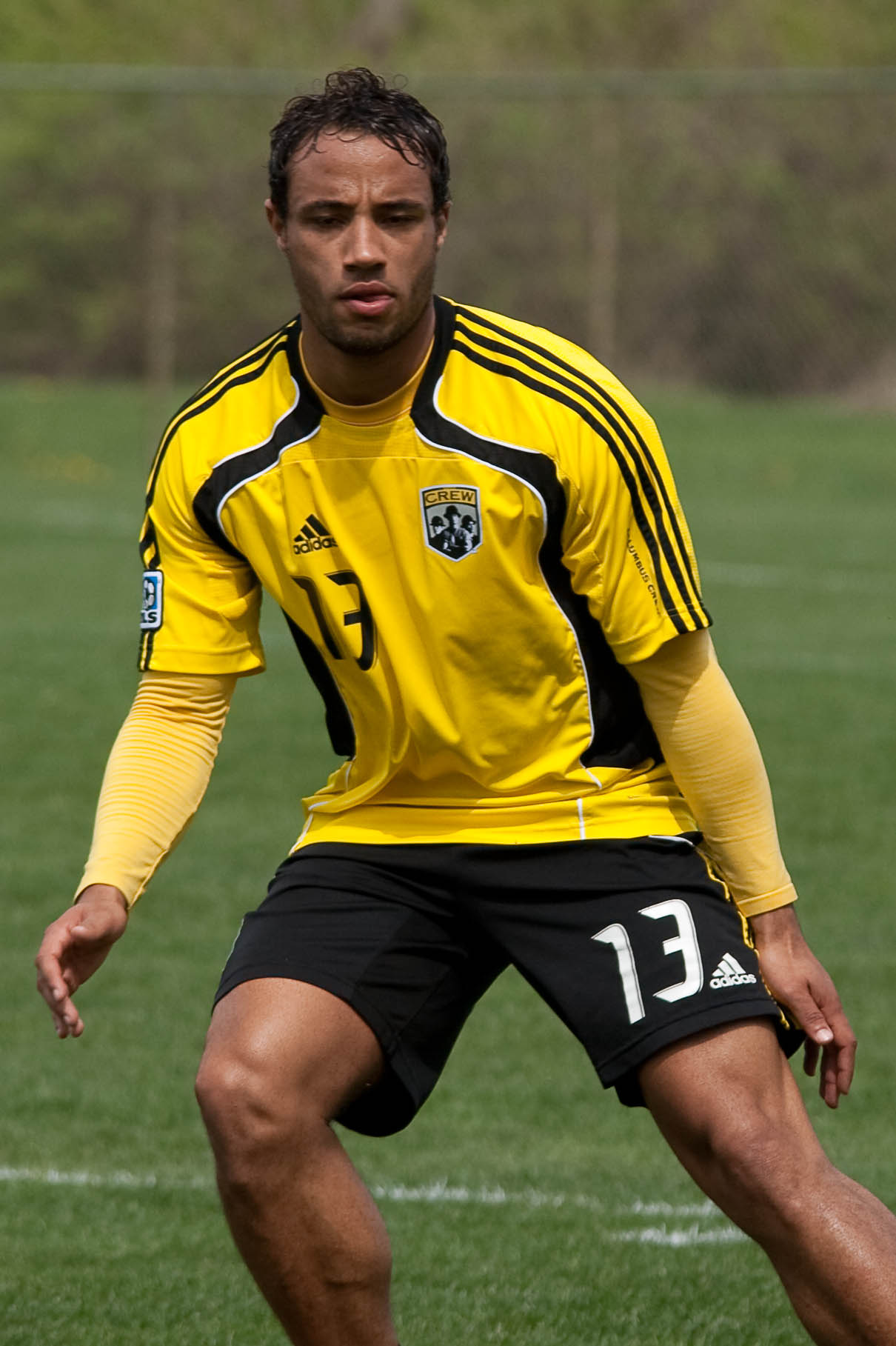

Personal information
- Date of birth: 21 May 1984 (age 42)
- Place of birth: Maubeuge, France
- Height: 1.72 m (5 ft 8 in)
- Position: Winger

Youth career
- –2002: Amiens SC

Senior career*
Years	Team	Apps	(Gls)
2002–2003	Amiens SC	18	(0)
2003–2005	Southampton	7	(2)
2005	→ Leeds United (loan)	1	(0)
2005	→ Rotherham United (loan)	2	(0)
2005–2008	Elfsborg	21	(1)
2007–2008	→ Norrköping (loan)	10	(0)
2008–2009	Crystal Palace	5	(0)
2009–2010	Centre	17	(4)
2010–2011	Columbus Crew	4	(1)
2011	Toronto FC	0	(0)
2012–2016	AS Aulnoye	84	(5)
2016	Feignies Aulnoye	1	(0)

International career^{‡}
	France U21	2	(0)
- * Club domestic league appearances and goals as of 3 November 2015 ‡ National team caps and goals as of 11 August 2008

Léandre Griffit (born 21 May 1984) is a French professional footballer who plays as a winger and is currently a free agent.

== Career ==
=== Europe ===
Griffit was born in Maubeuge. He began his career in his native France with Amiens SC, before moving to Southampton in the Premiership in 2003. He only played seven games for Southampton and scored against Blackburn Rovers and Newcastle United. He was loaned out to Leeds United and Rotherham United before being released.

He then moved to Sweden and played for IF Elfsborg where he only played 21 games and was loaned out to IFK Norrköping in the 2007–08 season. In the summer of 2008 he went on an unsuccessful trial with Championship Plymouth Argyle. He then went on trial with Neil Warnock's Crystal Palace and was signed, but only made a handful of appearances for the club before departing.

=== North America ===
After an unsuccessful trial with Major League Soccer club Houston Dynamo, Griffit went on to sign with Houston's league rivals Columbus Crew on 16 April 2010.

Griffit made his first-team debut for the Crew on 6 July 2010 in the Black & Gold's 3–0 home triumph over the USL-2 Charleston Battery in the 2010 Lamar Hunt US Open Cup Quarterfinals. He entered the match in the 76th minute and was credited with an assist on the Crew's third goal.

He made his first MLS appearance on 24 July 2010 against the Dynamo, entering in the 87th minute, and scoring his first MLS goal three minutes later by collecting a rebound of a shot by Guillermo Barros Schelotto.

On 15 July 2011, he was traded to Toronto FC along with Andy Iro for Tony Tchani. Griffit made his debut for Toronto in the CONCACAF Champions League group stage on 25 August against FC Dallas, he came on as a second half sub for Gianluca Zavarise.

Griffit was waived by Toronto on 23 November 2011.

== Personal ==
Griffit is married to Milena and they have a son, Enzo.

== Career statistics ==
Appearances and goals by club, season and competition
Club	Season	League		Cup		Total	
Club	Season	Apps	Goals	Apps	Goals	Apps	Goals
Amiens	2002–03	18	0	?	?	18	0
Southampton	2003–04	5	2	0	0	5	2
Southampton	2004–05	2	0	1	0	3	0
Southampton	Total	7	2	1	0	8	2
Leeds (loan)	2004–05	1	0	0	0	1	0
Rotherham (loan)	2004–05	2	0	0	0	2	0
IF Elfsborg	2006	7	1	0	0	7	1
IF Elfsborg	2007	12	0	0	0	12	0
IF Elfsborg	2008	2	0	0	0	2	0
IF Elfsborg	Total	21	1	0	0	21	1
IFK Norrköping (loan)	2007	9	0	0	0	9	0
IFK Norrköping (loan)	2008	1	0	0	0	1	0
Crystal Palace	2008–09	5	0	1	0	6	0
URS du Centre	2009–10	17	4	0	0	17	4
Columbus Crew	2010	1	1	1	0	2	1
Career total		84	8	3	0	87	8

== Honours ==
IF Elfsborg

- 2006 Allsvenskan champions
