= Alex Grendi =

American soccer player

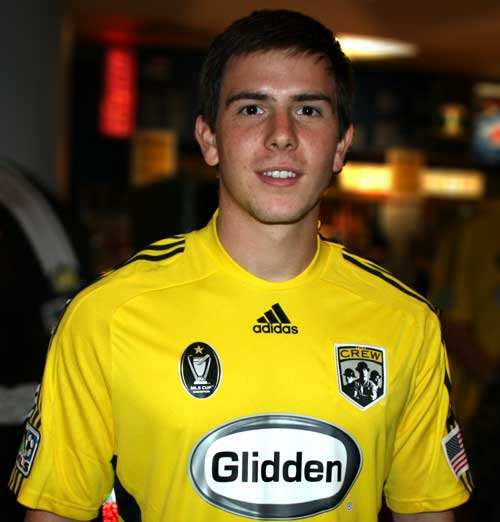

Personal information
- Full name: Alex Grendi
- Date of birth: July 28, 1987 (age 39)
- Place of birth: Cold Spring Harbor, New York, United States
- Height: 5 ft 11 in (1.80 m)
- Position: Midfielder

Youth career
- 2005–2008: Pennsylvania Quakers

Senior career*
Years	Team	Apps	(Gls)
2007	Long Island Rough Riders	16	(3)
2009	Columbus Crew	3	(0)
2010	Long Island Rough Riders	8	(2)
2011	Wilmington Hammerheads	8	(1)
- * Club domestic league appearances and goals as of June 4, 2011

Alex Grendi (born July 28, 1987) is a men's sex coach and former professional soccer player.

== Career ==
=== College ===
Grendi played college soccer at the University of Pennsylvania. During his college years Grendi also played with Long Island Rough Riders in the USL Premier Development League.

=== Professional ===
Grendi was drafted in the third round (45th overall) of the 2009 MLS SuperDraft by the Columbus Crew. He made his professional debut on 21 March 2009, in Crew's first game of the 2009 MLS season against Houston Dynamo, and subsequently played two more MLS games before being cut on March 23, 2010.

Having been released due to a recurring knee injury, Grendi returned to the University of Pennsylvania to finish his degree and play for the Long Island Rough Riders in the USL Premier Development League in 2010.

On April 5, 2011, Grendi signed with Wilmington Hammerheads of the USL Pro league. On June 6, 2011, Grendi tore his ACL and was unable to play for the remainder of the season.

== Post-playing career ==
Following his professional soccer career, Grendi founded an agency to help provide American soccer players with opportunities overseas.

Grendi currently works as a sex coach, helping men overcome premature ejaculation and erectile dysfunction with a 12-week online course.
