= Gino Padula =

Argentine former professional footballer (born 1976)

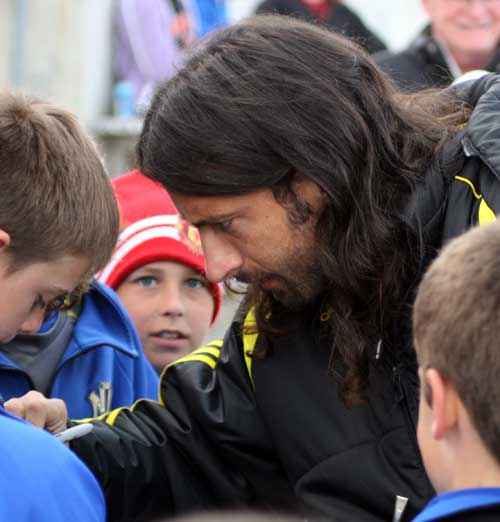
- Padula signings autographs in April 2008

Personal information
- Full name: Gino Mauro Padula
- Date of birth: 11 July 1976 (age 50)
- Place of birth: Lanús, Argentina
- Height: 5 ft 9 in (1.75 m)
- Position: Left back

Senior career*
Years	Team	Apps	(Gls)
1996–1997	River Plate	3	(0)
1997–1998	Huracán	31	(1)
1998–1999	Xerez	7	(0)
1999	Bristol Rovers	0	(0)
1999–2000	Walsall	25	(0)
2000–2001	Wigan Athletic	4	(0)
2002–2005	Queens Park Rangers	90	(4)
2005–2006	Nottingham Forest	3	(0)
2007–2008	Montpellier	7	(0)
2008–2010	Columbus Crew	56	(1)
Total		195	(6)

Managerial career
- 2011–: SP Soccer Academy
- * Club domestic league appearances and goals

Gino Mauro Padula (born 11 July 1976) is an Argentine former professional footballer who played as a left back. Born in Lanús, Padula played in Argentina, Spain, England, France and the United States. He started his career in the esteemed River Plate system, but achieved highest accolades while at Queens Park Rangers and Columbus Crew.

== Career ==
Padula first moved to England when he joined Bristol Rovers in 1999, however he only joined on trial and didn't make an appearance for them. He then moved on to Walsall for whom he made 27 appearances in 1999–2000, and was voted their player of the season. However, at the end of the season, Walsall were relegated. Padula signed for Wigan Athletic in 2000, and at Wigan he scored his first goal in English football in a Football League Trophy tie against his former club Walsall.

=== Queens Park Rangers ===
After leaving Wigan in 2001 and spending a year in Argentina, his most successful spell came at QPR, where he became somewhat of a cult hero. Padula was signed in 2002 by then QPR manager Ian Holloway who he had worked with during his spell at Bristol Rovers. He initially found it hard to break into the first team. Padula made his debut for the club as a substitute against Barnsley on 17 August 2002. His first start for QPR came on 2 November 2002 against Port Vale, however in the first half goalkeeper Simon Royce was sent off and substitute goalkeeper Fraser Digby was brought on for Padula. He eventually got his chance due to injuries from January 2003, and he finally started to display his tough slide tackling and steely determination. Padula became an overnight fan-favourite and one of the first names on the team sheet. As his confidence grew, he became more and more attacking, and his prowess from dead balls became legendary with the QPR faithful. He scored his first goal for the club against Port Vale, the same team he was disappointingly substituted off against months earlier.

Padula helped QPR to the 2003 Division Two playoff final, which he started and performed solidly against Cardiff City at the Millennium Stadium. He was withdrawn in the 79th minute, being replaced by Tommy Williams. QPR lost the game one-nil after extra time. The following season, Padula started 36 league games for QPR and scored 3 goals. QPR finished second only to Plymouth and won promotion back to the second tier of English football, the newly renamed Championship. Upon winning promotion on the final day of the season, beating Sheffield Wednesday 3–1 at Hillsborough, Padula danced in front of the 8000 travelling QPR fans, holding an Argentina flag.

He remains one of the most popular modern-era QPR characters.

=== Columbus Crew ===
Padula signed for Major League Soccer side Columbus Crew on 24 March 2008, after going on trial with the club during preseason. He made his debut for the American side on matchday three and started all 14 games that he appeared in during the regular season, missing twelve games due to knee and hamstring injuries. At the conclusion of the regular season, the Columbus Crew finished with the best record in the league, winning the 2008 MLS Supporters Shield. During the playoffs, Padula started all four games for Columbus, helping his team win 2008 MLS Cup. During the 2009 season, Padula scored the only goal in an October matchup versus the New England Revolution, his only goal for the club. The club repeated as Supporters' Shield winners in 2009.

== Coaching ==
Following his retirement in 2011, he established Sporting Padula Soccer Academy in Westerville, Ohio. Padula has been certified to coach by FIFA and holds an "A" license.

== Honors ==
Columbus Crew

- MLS Cup: 2008
- Supporters Shield: 2008, 2009

Individual

- PFA Team of the Year: 2003–04 Second Division
