= 2010 New York Red Bulls season =

New York Red Bulls
2010 season
- General manager: Erik Solér
- Head coach: Hans Backe
- MLS: 3rd
- U.S. Open Cup: Round of 16
- MLS Cup Playoffs: Conference semi-final
- Top goalscorer: League: Juan Pablo Ángel (13); All: Juan Pablo Ángel (13)
- Highest home attendance: 25,000 vs. Los Angeles (August 14, 2010)
- Lowest home attendance: 1,935 vs. New England (May 12, 2010)
- Average home league attendance: 18,625
Home colors	Away colors

The 2010 New York Red Bulls season was their fifteenth in Major League Soccer, and in their existence.

Following a dismal 2009 season, the Red Bulls saw the arrival of Swedish head coach Hans Backe. Backe replaced interim coach Richie Williams, who became an assistant.

In part of an entire overhaul to the club, the Red Bulls made several notable signings throughout the season including retired French international Thierry Henry; Mexico's national team captain, Rafael Márquez; as well as players including Tim Ream and Joel Lindpere.

The Red Bulls went on a worst-to-first campaign, topping the Eastern Conference by one point over Columbus before losing 3–2 on aggregate against San Jose in the quarterfinals of the 2010 MLS Cup Playoffs.

== Monthly overview ==
=== November 2009 ===
The contract for defender Leo Krupnik was terminated and he returned to Israel. Midfielder Nick Zimmerman was selected in the 2009 MLS Expansion Draft by the Philadelphia Union on November 25. Veteran midfielder Albert Celades retired after one year with the club.

=== December 2009 ===
Erik Solér was named Red Bull New York General Manager and Sporting Director on December 7 and made responsible for the overall management of the New York Red Bulls, including its sporting division – comprising the First Team, the Red Bulls Academy, its developmental system and scouting. His most pressing concern was to name a head coach.

=== January ===
The Red Bulls named Sweden's Hans Backe head coach on January 7. "I have followed Hans' career for many years and I think he will be an excellent coach for this team", said Red Bull New York General Manager and Sporting Director Erik Solér. "Hans brings a vast amount of experience from a variety of different clubs in Europe and he has been a fantastic mentor for many young and established players. We are confident that he will be able to help our club accomplish our goal of competing for a MLS Cup."

The new regime made many roster moves during the month. The club said goodbye to disappointing midfielder Jorge Rojas when he signed with a club in his native Venezuela on January 1. One week later the Red Bulls signed Costa Rican international defender Roy Miller. At the 2010 MLS SuperDraft on January 14, the club picked midfielder Tony Tchani and midfielder Austin da Luz in the first round, defender Tim Ream in the second round, forward Conor Chinn in the third round, and midfielder/forward Irving Garcia in the fourth round. Tchani signed with MLS as a Generation adidas player, meaning he has no salary cap impact for 2010 (and possibly a year or two more). The club also traded picks in the second and third round to acquire defender Chris Albright from the New England Revolution.

Also, on January 29, the Red Bulls traded their No. 1 slot in the MLS Allocation Rankings to the Philadelphia Union in exchange for the No. 6 slot and allocation money. Philadelphia used the pick to sign defender Michael Orozco Fiscal.

The Red Bulls opened preseason training in Spain where the club played CSKA Moscow to a 1–1 draw and defeated Polish club Lech Poznań 1–0.

=== February ===
The Red Bulls cut goalkeeper Danny Cepero, and defenders Walter García and Carlos Johnson. The club also declined the contract option for midfielder Matthew Mbuta and hired Goran Aral as an assistant coach. Head coach Hans Backe confirmed that the club signed Estonian international Joel Lindpere, though the paperwork was not yet complete.

In preseason play, the Red Bulls won the 2010 Walt Disney World Pro Soccer Classic tournament in Orlando, beating Toronto FC 4–0 in the final behind three goals from captain Juan Pablo Ángel.

=== March ===
Personnel moves dominated the month with the start of the regular season scheduled for March 27. SuperDraft picks Tim Ream, Conor Chinn and Irving Garcia were signed to contracts as was veteran goalkeeper Greg Sutton and Estonian import Joel Lindpere. The club acquired midfielder Carl Robinson from Toronto FC for a 2011 MLS SuperDraft pick, watched Enar Jääger and Yevhen Levchenko come and go as trialists, and sent Ernst Öbster back to Austria. On March 26, the club signed forward Juan Agudelo as a Homegrown Player from Red Bulls Academy. The U.S. Youth international had also been courted by sides in his native Columbia. The club announced that forward Giorgi Chirgadze, the first player signed from Red Bulls Academy, would likely miss the season due to a hip injury.

The most significant news of the month for all players and clubs was the signing of a new collective bargaining agreement between the league and the Major League Soccer Players Union. The new deal, announced March 20, ensured that the 2010 MLS season would take place as scheduled. The new agreement lasts through December 31, 2014.

On the field, the Red Bulls hosted Santos of Brazil in an exhibition match to open Red Bull Arena on March 20, 2010. The Red Bulls emerged 3–1 victors with the first ever Red Bull Arena goal being scored by midfielder Joel Lindpere. Longtime franchise defender Mike Petke and winger Dane Richards scored as well.

New York began the regular season at home with a win against the Chicago Fire on March 27 in the first MLS match at Red Bull Arena in front of a crowd of 24,572. Newcomer Joel Lindpere scored the first league goal in Red Bull Arena history. Rookie defender Tim Ream went the full 90 minutes while first-round SuperDraft pick Tony Tchani debuted as a 90th-minute substitute.

On March 30, the club announced it had signed assistant coach Richie Williams to a contract extension. Williams has twice served as Red Bulls interim manager, including for the final eight games of the 2009 season.

=== April ===
New York built on its opening day victory with three wins in four league matches, ending the month off to their best start in nine years at 4–1–0. Captain Juan Pablo Ángel led the way with 3 goals. The first victory, 1–0 over Seattle Sounders FC on April 3, snapped a regular-season road winless streak that dated back to May 3, 2008.

The club also advanced in their play-in game for the U.S. Open Cup against the Philadelphia Union with a 2–1 win at home with rookie Conor Chinn scoring both goals. New addition Ibrahim Salou stated "Mentally, we're very, very strong. It comes also from the head coach, he is very strong and very relaxed and doesn't put too much pressure on the players. It comes forward to the players, how relaxed he is. That's very important. It helps us when we get to the field and we stay in the games and in the end we've been getting the three points, which is important for us."

Brittle forward Macoumba Kandji broke a bone in his right foot during training April 20 and was ruled out for 8–12 weeks. In other player news, the club signed forward Ibrahim Salou, acquired midfielder Brian Nielsen on loan from Danish side Vejle, and officially waived seldom-used midfielder Ernst Öbster. The league announced on April 1 that all clubs would now have two Designated Player slots with an option to purchase a third. As the Red Bulls already had two slots due to a 2007 trade with Chivas USA, the club received $70,000 in allocation money from the league as compensation.

The club announced that a mid-season friendly tournament called the 2010 New York Football Challenge would take place from July 22–25 at Red Bull Arena with Manchester City F.C., Tottenham Hotspur F.C., and likely Sporting Lisbon joining the Red Bulls in the tourney field.

=== May ===
New York finished the month by qualifying for the Round of 16 of the U.S. Open Cup with 3–0 wins over the New England Revolution and Colorado Rapids. At the same time their league form took a slide with four losses in a row. Midfielder Danleigh Borman stated, "I think we've been playing well" and "we just need to find a way to win."

MLS fined head coach Hans Backe $2,500 for comments made following their 3–2 loss to New England at Gillette Stadium. Backe stated "I would say it's an absolute disgrace. It's ridiculous, it's a joke" and "when the referee decides games like this, probably the MLS should do an investigation because it's not even close to hitting. You can see the level of the referee, the level went [up and down]. It's a joke. If this had been in Italy there would be an investigation if the referee was bought."

Fielding a largely reserve lineup, the Red Bulls defeated out-of-season Serie A side Juventus FC 3–1 in an exhibition match at Red Bull Arena on May 23.

In injury news, defender Kevin Goldthwaite re-injured himself during training and was deemed likely to miss the season. Also, it was announced on May 26 that midfielder Carl Robinson would miss 5–6 weeks with a knee injury.

=== June ===
New York looked to bounce back from a dismal May in a shortened month due to the 2010 FIFA World Cup. The team won their three league matches due mostly to GK Bouna Coundoul earning two clean sheets and a solidified Red Bulls defense. Coach Backe stated "I think we started the season very well with our defense and how we maintained our shape", and "we're still conceding too many opportunities in the back although we are performing better over the past few games."

The squad also looked to advance in U.S. Open Cup play when they faced the Harrisburg City Islanders in the Round of 16. The USL Second Division team pulled off the upset in extra time with a goal in the 117th minute by Dominic Oppong. Backe stated "the way we played – that's the history of the cup. We played three good games – New England, Colorado and Philadelphia – and then a poor one last night. You always have to play at a high level, and our performance dipped in a way." GK Greg Sutton added "we should never have put ourselves in that spot in the first place", when addressing the goal scored to eliminate the Red Bulls.

The team ended the month with top scorer Juan Pablo Ángel named MLS Player of the Week for his performance against the Kansas City Wizards by scoring two goals in a span of 8 minutes to seal the victory for New York. Ángel finished the month with 3 goals, which brought his season total to 9, placing him one goal behind the Los Angeles Galaxy's Edson Buddle for the 2010 MLS Golden Boot.

The club lost to Brazilian side Cruzeiro 4–2 in a June 18 friendly.

Defender Andrew Boyens represented New Zealand at the 2010 FIFA World Cup.

=== July ===
On July 14, Thierry Henry joined the Red Bulls after a successful three years at FC Barcelona, taking his usual number 14. Henry stated, "this marks an exciting new chapter in my career and life", and "it is an honor to play for the New York Red Bulls. I am fully aware of the team's history and my sole goal during my time here is to help win the club its first championship. Knowing Red Bull's significant commitment to soccer locally and internationally, I am confident that my teammates and I will succeed." Erik Solér, Red Bull New York General Manager and Sporting Director stated "Thierry is not only a world class player who will undoubtedly improve our squad, but he has shown most importantly throughout his career that he is a winner. He has made it clear to us that he is committed in the short and long term to help in our vision of making our organization the premium franchise in Major League Soccer."

New teammate Seth Stammler stated "there is no doubt [Henry] can play and he is going to come in and contribute right away, hopefully he can take our team to the next level as we chase the top of the East, the overall MLS points lead and obviously take that momentum into the playoffs and a chance at the MLS Cup." Juan Pablo Ángel, "he's arguably one of the best players in our generation. He's a player that has won everything he could possibly win in this sport and he's still fit. I think it's an honor to have him here, he's going to be a tremendous addition to the league, to the Red Bulls. It keeps showing how much effort this company is putting in for this sport in the country." Tim Ream, "it's kind of wild to think about it, coming in, I knew I was going to be playing with Juan Pablo and I knew what kind of player he was. You put [Angel and Henry] together—it's pretty incredible. There is not much you can say about them. They are just spectacular players."

To make roster space for Henry, the Red Bulls waived veteran and fan-favorite John Wolyniec. Known as the "Staten Island Ronaldinho", New York native son Wolyniec played 166 games and scored 35 goals in all competitions during his three stints with the MetroStars/Red Bulls franchise. He left having also scored the only MLS Cup goal in franchise history.

On July 9, the club activated forward Macoumba Kandji from the injured reserve list and placed midfielder Brian Nielsen on the injured list.

On the field, the club struggled and failed to win a league match. Results for the month were: 1–1 draw at Colorado Rapids on July 4, 0–0 draw home versus D.C. United on July 10, 2–0 defeat at Columbus Crew on July 17, and 2–2 draw at Houston Dynamo on July 31. The club also hosted the 2010 Barclays New York Challenge in which it defeated Manchester City and lost to Tottenham Hotspur. The fourth participant in the friendly tournament was Sporting Lisbon.

Red Bulls captain Ángel was the lone club representative chosen to play in the 2010 MLS All-Star Game held July 28 in Houston. Ángel played the first half of the 5–2 loss to Manchester United of the Premier League. Midfielder Joel Lindpere was named an inactive All-Star selection by the league.

=== August ===
On August 2, Juan Pablo Ángel was again named MLS Player of the Week for his two-goal performance against the Houston Dynamo on July 31. That same day, the Red Bulls announced the signing of Mexico national team captain Rafael Márquez. Márquez arrived on a free transfer after seven years with La Liga giants FC Barcelona. He joined Henry and Ángel as Designated Players. "I am excited to be joining the Red Bulls", Marquez said. "Despite having the opportunity to fulfill my contract with Barcelona, coming to New York and playing in Major League Soccer was a chance that I could not refuse. I am completely committed to doing my very best to help the Red Bulls in their playoff push this year and compete for championships in the years to come."

On August 6, the club announced that midfielders Luke Sassano and Brian Nielsen would miss the remainder of the season due to injury and that defender Kevin Goldthwaite had been waived. Two weeks later Goldthwaite signed with the D2 Portland Timbers.

Internationally, Dane Richards scored his first career goal for Jamaica in a 3–1 friendly victory over Trinidad and Tobago on August 11. Midfielder Joel Lindpere rejected a call-up by Estonia to concentrate on his club duties with the Red Bulls.

With only league play to focus on, the Red Bulls started to perform better. During August the team picked up 10 points from 5 games, defeating Toronto FC both home and away, defeating the San Jose Earthquakes at home, drawing at the Chicago Fire, and losing at home versus the Los Angeles Galaxy. With the victory at Toronto, the Red Bulls became the first road team to win at TFC in over a year.

=== September ===
September began with the announcement that defender Mike Petke, the all-time franchise leader in games played, games started and minutes played, would retire at season's end. Petke had lost his starting position earlier in the season. "After many months of contemplation, I know that this is the best choice for me and my family", Petke said. "When I first started playing in MLS, I could have not imagined the type of career I was so fortunate to experience over these past 13 years. I am indebted to my family, current and former teammates and coaches and the fans for their support and encouragement. I am at peace with my decision and blessed that I am able to end my career in a place where I truly call home."

Eight days later John Wolyniec announced his retirement. After being released by the club in late July to make roster space for Thierry Henry, Wolyniec entertained offers from other clubs. Finding no offers to his liking, he accepted a position with the Red Bulls Academy on September 9.

Five days after that a third long-time MetroStar/Red Bull announced his retirement. Midfielder Seth Stammler, the longest continuously tenured Red Bulls player, said he would retire at the conclusion on the season. In actuality, Stammler left the club after the September 11 match to pursue a graduate degree at the University of Chicago. He did not feature in any of the remaining 6 games or 2 playoff fixtures.

On September 14, the Red Bulls traded talented but mercurial forward Macoumba Kandji to the Colorado Rapids in exchange for midfielder Mehdi Ballouchy. Two days later, Ballouchy started for the club in its match at FC Dallas. Captain Juan Pablo Ángel was benched to make room for Ballouchy. This controversial move, when coupled with the arrival of Henry, fueled speculation about Ángel's future with the club. Near month's end Ángel told the New York Post, "(If) you ask me would I like to stay here, I would because I get along with everybody here. I've been expecting a team like this for years and finally we brought it. But if I have to move on, I will move on. I wish them well. I think (my departure) is very likely; but having said that, I've been grateful for every minute that I've been here." Ángel started all remaining games. The Dallas game also featured a bizarre incident in which Thierry Henry injured himself and Dallas goalkeeper Kevin Hartman during a goal celebration. Henry was fined $2000 by MLS while Hartman missed several weeks of action.

Besides the one-game benching of Ángel, the introduction of Ballouchy into the midfield also proved disruptive to the team's rotation and resulted in less playing time for emerging rookie Tony Tchani.

On September 16, the club traded for D.C. United defender Carey Talley, surrendering a second-round pick in the 2011 MLS SuperDraft in exchange. Talley started for the Red Bulls on September 24 and played 40 minutes before getting injured and missing the rest of the season. Also on September 16, the Red Bulls announced that little-used rookie midfielder Irving Garcia would miss the rest of the season due to injury.

The Red Bulls continued making progress toward a playoff spot by defeating the Colorado Rapids 3–1 on September 11, drawing 2–2 at FC Dallas on September 16, and winning 2–0 at the Los Angeles Galaxy on September 24. The club started the month with a 1–0 loss at defending MLS Cup champion Real Salt Lake. At month's end, the Red Bulls stood second in the Eastern Conference behind only the Columbus Crew.

On September 7, original franchise owner John Kluge died at the age of 95. Kluge owned the club from its founding in 1995 until selling it in 2001.

=== October ===
On October 2, the Red Bulls defeated the Kansas City Wizards 1–0 to clinch a playoff spot and move into first place in the Eastern Conference, a remarkable turnaround for a club that finished last the prior season. Goalkeeper Bouna Coundoul was named MLS Player of the Week for his 12 save performance in the KC game.

The Red Bulls followed this performance with a scoreless draw against Real Salt Lake, a 2–1 loss at the Philadelphia Union, and a regular season-ending 2–0 victory over the New England Revolution. These results, along with mediocre late season play by the rival Columbus Crew, ensured a first-place finish in the Eastern Conference for the Red Bulls.

The club drew the San Jose Earthquakes, sixth-place finisher in the Western Conference, in the first-round of the playoffs. The first leg was held October 30 in San Jose. Joel Lindpere scored the game's only goal in the 55th minute and New York brought a 1–0 aggregate lead home to Red Bull Arena for the November 4 return leg. The October 30 match was also notable as it marked the first MLS start for 17-year-old Red Bulls Academy product Juan Agudelo, who had previously started only U.S. Open Cup matches.

Off the field, General Manager Erik Solér told the press that the club would sign Norwegian international Jan Gunnar Solli and English forward Luke Rodgers in January. The club did indeed sign these players in January. Meanwhile, captain Juan Pablo Ángel confirmed that he would not return in 2011, telling the press, "I know that I won't be a part of this team next year. For a fact."

=== November ===
The return leg of the first-round playoff match with San Jose proved to be among the biggest disappointments in club history. Leading 1–0 on aggregate, the Red Bulls played woeful defense in losing 3–1 at home on November 4, falling 3–2 in aggregate. Two Bobby Convey goals staked San Jose to a 2–1 series lead before Juan Pablo Ángel scored in the 78th minute to level the series. However, MLS Golden Boot winner Chris Wondolowski scored three minutes later to restore San Jose's edge. In the dying moments, late substitute Thierry Henry sent a wide-open header over the crossbar and the Red Bulls worst-to-first season ended. Teenage striker Juan Agudelo played brilliantly, hitting the post with a 39th minute shot, setting up Mehdi Ballouchy for a good chance in the 60th minute, and assisting on Ángel's final Red Bulls goal in the 78th minute.

At the conclusion of the season, Estonian midfielder Joel Lindpere was named team Most Valuable Player, rookie Tim Ream was named team Defender of the Year, captain Juan Pablo Ángel won the team Golden Boot, and midfielder Seth Stammler received the club's Humanitarian of the Year award. Stammler also received the league-wide MLS W.O.R.K.S. Humanitarian of the Year for his charitable work in Haiti. MLS awarded its Executive of the Year award to Red Bull New York Managing Director Erik Stover.

== Club ==
=== 2010 roster ===
As of August 10, 2010.

Note: Flags indicate national team as defined under FIFA eligibility rules; some limited exceptions apply. Players may hold more than one non-FIFA nationality.

No.	Pos.	Nation	Player
2	DF	USA	Carey Talley
3	DF	USA	Chris Albright
4	MF	MEX	Rafael Márquez
5	DF	USA	Tim Ream
6	MF	USA	Seth Stammler
7	DF	CRC	Roy Miller
8	MF	BIH	Siniša Ubiparipović
9	FW	COL	Juan Pablo Ángel (captain)
10	MF	MAR	Mehdi Ballouchy
11	MF	RSA	Danleigh Borman
12	DF	USA	Mike Petke
13	MF	USA	Austin da Luz
14	FW	FRA	Thierry Henry
17	MF	USA	Jeremy Hall
18	GK	SEN	Bouna Coundoul

No.	Pos.	Nation	Player
19	MF	JAM	Dane Richards
20	MF	EST	Joel Lindpere
21	MF	DEN	Brian Nielsen (on loan from Vejle)
22	FW	GEO	Giorgi Chirgadze
23	MF	CMR	Tony Tchani
24	GK	CAN	Greg Sutton
25	FW	USA	Conor Chinn
27	DF	NZL	Andrew Boyens
29	FW	GHA	Ibrahim Salou
32	DF	USA	Luke Sassano
33	MF	WAL	Carl Robinson
39	FW	USA	Juan Agudelo
44	DF	USA	Carlos Mendes
99	MF	USA	Irving Garcia

=== 2010 technical staff ===
Position	Staff
Head Coach	(Sweden) Hans Backe
Managing Director	(United States) Erik Stover
Sporting Director	(Norway) Erik Solér
Assistant Coach	(Sweden) Göran Aral
Assistant Coach	(United States) Richie Williams
Goalkeeper Coach	(Republic of Ireland) Des McAleenan
Fitness Coach	(United States) Jeremy Holsopple
Athletic Trainer	(United States) Rick Guter

Last updated: July 3
Source: New York Red Bulls official website

== Transfers ==
=== In ===
Date	Player	Previous club	Fee	Ref
January 8, 2010	(Costa Rica) Roy Miller	(Norway) Rosenborg	Undisclosed	
January 14, 2010	(United States) Chris Albright	(United States) New England	Trade	
January 14, 2010	(Cameroon) Tony Tchani	Unattached	Drafted	
January 14, 2010	(United States) Austin da Luz	(United States) Wake Forest Demon Deacons	Drafted	
January 14, 2010	(United States) Tim Ream	(United States) Saint Louis Billikens	Drafted	
January 14, 2010	(United States) Conor Chinn	(United States) Orange County Blue Star	Drafted	
January 14, 2010	(United States) Irving Garcia	(United States) UC Irvine Anteaters	Drafted	
March 3, 2010	(Wales) Carl Robinson	(Canada) Toronto	Trade	
March 5, 2010	(Estonia) Joel Lindpere	(Norway) Tromsø	Undisclosed	
March 11, 2010	(Canada) Greg Sutton	Toronto	Free	
March 23, 2010	(Ghana) Ibrahim Salou	(Denmark) Vejle	Undisclosed	
March 26, 2010	(United States) Juan Agudelo	Academy	Free	
July 14, 2010	(France) Thierry Henry	(Spain) Barcelona	Free	
August 2, 2010	(Mexico) Rafael Márquez	(Spain) Barcelona	Free	
September 14, 2010	(Morocco) Mehdi Ballouchy	(United States) Colorado	Trade	
September 15, 2010	(United States) Carey Talley	(United States) D.C. United	Trade	

=== Out ===
Date	Player	Destination club	Fee	Ref
October 24, 2009	(Spain) Albert Celades	(Hong Kong) Kitchee	Free	
November 18, 2009	(United States) Leo Krupnik	(Israel) Maccabi Netanya	Free	
November 25, 2009	(United States) Nick Zimmerman	(United States) Philadelphia Union	Expansion Draft	
January 3, 2010	(Venezuela) Jorge Rojas	(Venezuela) Deportivo Táchira	Free	
February 12, 2010	(United States) Danny Cepero	(United States) Harrisburg City Islanders	Released	
February 12, 2010	(Costa Rica) Carlos Johnson	(Colombia) Once Caldas	Released	
February 12, 2010	(Argentina) Walter García	(Argentina) Juventud Antoniana	Released	
February 12, 2010	(Cameroon) Matthew Mbuta	(United States) Crystal Palace Baltimore	Released	
March 24, 2010	(Austria) Ernst Öbster	(Austria) Wacker Innsbruck	Released	
July 30, 2010	(United States) John Wolyniec	Retired	Released	
August 6, 2010	(United States) Kevin Goldthwaite	(United States) Portland Timbers	Released	
September 14, 2010	(Senegal) Macoumba Kandji	(United States) Colorado Rapids	Trade	

=== Loan ===
==== In ====
Player	From	Start	End	Ref
(Denmark) Brian Nielsen	(Denmark) Vejle	April 14, 2010	December 31, 2010	

== Competitions ==
=== Overall ===
Competition	Started round	Current position / round	Final position / round	First match	Last match
MLS	—	—	3rd	March 27	October 21
MLS Cup Playoffs	Quarterfinals	—	Quarterfinals	October 30	November 4
U.S. Open Cup	Qualifier	—	Round of 16	April 27	June 29

Updated to match played November 22
Source: Competitions

== Standings ==
=== Conference ===
Pos	Team	Pld	W	L	T	GF	GA	GD	Pts	Qualification
1	New York Red Bulls	30	15	9	6	38	29	+9	51	MLS Cup Playoffs
2	Columbus Crew	30	14	8	8	40	34	+6	50	MLS Cup Playoffs
3	Kansas City Wizards	30	11	13	6	36	35	+1	39	
4	Chicago Fire	30	9	12	9	37	38	−1	36	
5	Toronto FC	30	9	13	8	33	41	−8	35	
6	New England Revolution	30	9	16	5	32	50	−18	32	
7	Philadelphia Union	30	8	15	7	35	49	−14	31	
8	D.C. United	30	6	20	4	21	47	−26	22	

Source: MLS

=== Overall ===
Pos	Team	Pld	W	L	T	GF	GA	GD	Pts	Qualification
1	LA Galaxy (S)	30	18	7	5	44	26	+18	59	CONCACAF Champions League
2	Real Salt Lake	30	15	4	11	45	20	+25	56	
3	New York Red Bulls	30	15	9	6	38	29	+9	51	
4	FC Dallas	30	12	4	14	42	28	+14	50	CONCACAF Champions League
5	Columbus Crew	30	14	8	8	40	34	+6	50	
6	Seattle Sounders FC	30	14	10	6	39	35	+4	48	CONCACAF Champions League
7	Colorado Rapids (C)	30	12	8	10	44	32	+12	46	CONCACAF Champions League
8	San Jose Earthquakes	30	13	10	7	34	33	+1	46	
9	Kansas City Wizards	30	11	13	6	36	35	+1	39	
10	Chicago Fire	30	9	12	9	37	38	−1	36	
11	Toronto FC	30	9	13	8	33	41	−8	35	CONCACAF Champions League
12	Houston Dynamo	30	9	15	6	40	49	−9	33	
13	New England Revolution	30	9	16	5	32	50	−18	32	
14	Philadelphia Union	30	8	15	7	35	49	−14	31	
15	Chivas USA	30	8	18	4	31	45	−14	28	
16	D.C. United	30	6	20	4	21	47	−26	22	

Source: MLS
Rules for classification: 1) points; 2) head-to-head record; 3) goal difference; 4) number of goals scored
(C) Champions; (S) Supporters' Shield

=== Results summary ===
Overall								Home						Away					
Pld	Pts	W	L	T	GF	GA	GD	W	L	T	GF	GA	GD	W	L	T	GF	GA	GD
30	51	15	9	6	38	29	+9	10	3	2	18	9	+9	5	6	4	20	20	0

Last updated: October 22
Source: MLSNet.com
Pld = Matches played; Pts = Points; W = Matches won; T = Matches tied; L = Matches lost; GF = Goals for; GA = Goals against; GD = Goal difference

=== Results by rounds ===
Round	1	2	3	4	5	6	7	8	9	10	11	12	13	14	15	16	17	18	19	20	21	22	23	24	25	26	27	28	29	30
Stadium	H	A	A	H	H	A	A	H	H	A	H	H	A	A	H	A	A	A	H	H	A	H	A	H	A	A	H	H	A	H
Result	W	W	L	W	W	W	L	L	L	L	W	W	W	T	T	L	T	T	W	L	W	W	L	W	T	W	W	T	L	W
Position	5	3	5	2	2	2	3	4	6	8	5	5	4	4	4	5	5	5	5	5	5	5	5	5	5	5	4	3	3	3

Updated to match(es) played on October 22. Source: MLS Results and League table
A = Away; H = Home; W = Win; L = Loss; T = Tie

== Match results ==
Win Draw Loss

=== Preseason ===
January 25, 2010	CSKA Moscow	1–1	New York	Alicante, Spain
17:00 CET	Necid 49'	Report	6' Richards	Stadium: Copamor Resort

January 28, 2010	Lech Poznań	0–1	New York	La Manga, Spain
15:00 CET		Report	42' Ángel	Stadium: La Manga Club

February 1, 2010	Strømsgodset	1–2	New York	La Manga, Spain
15:00 CET	Riddez 54'	Report	3' (o.g.) Aas; 76' Kolehmainen	Stadium: La Manga Club

February 17, 2010	United States U-17	0–6	New York	Bradenton
14:00 EDT		Report	2' (o.g.) Fender; 12' 54' Agudelo; 28' 42' Ángel; 76' Chinn	Stadium: IMG Academies

February 20, 2010	D.C. United	0–0	New York	Bradenton
16:00 EDT		http://redbull.newyork.mlsnet.com/news/team_news.jsp?ymd=20100220&content_id=8105676&vkey=news_rbn&fext=.jsp&team=t107		Stadium: IMG Academies

February 25, 2010	Houston Dynamo	0–0 (5–6 p)	New York	Orlando
18:00 EDT		http://redbull.newyork.mlsnet.com/news/team_news.jsp?ymd=20100225&content_id=8143164&vkey=pr_rbn&fext=.jsp&team=t107		Stadium: ESPN Wide World of Sports Complex
	Penalties
	Barrett (penalty scored); Oduro (penalty scored); Cruz (penalty scored); Maciel (penalty scored); Ustruck (penalty scored); Cameron (penalty missed)		(penalty scored) Ángel; (penalty scored) Lindpere; (penalty scored) Ubiparipović; (penalty scored) Ream; (penalty scored) Miller; (penalty scored) da Luz

February 27, 2010	Toronto	0–4	New York	Orlando
20:30 EDT		Report	32' 37' 49' Ángel; 85' Chinn	Stadium: ESPN Wide World of Sports Complex

March 9, 2010	Fort Lauderdale Strikers	0–4	New York	Fort Lauderdale
16:00 EDT		Report	65' Sassano; 72' Tchani; 75' Wolyniec; 86' Ubiparipovic

March 12, 2010	Miami	1–3	New York	Sunrise
11:30 EDT	Santeliz 16'	Report	3' Salou; 49' 52' Chinn	Stadium: Sunrise Holiday Inn Complex

March 20, 2010	New York	3–1	Santos	Harrison
19:05 EDT	Lindpere 11'; Petke 43'; Richards 45'	(Report)	90' Germano	Stadium: Red Bull Arena; Attendance: 25,000

=== Friendlies ===
March 29, 2010 Friendly	Army Black Knights	1–3	New York Red Bulls	West Point, New York
13:45 EDT	Koeppe 45'		21', 53' Agudelo; (yellow card) 44' Boyens; 88' Chinn	Stadium: Clinton Field; Attendance: 625; Referee: Garry Beaulier

April 6, 2010 Friendly	New York Red Bulls	5–0	Rutgers Scarlet Knights	Montclair, New Jersey
9:30 EDT	Garcia 25' 74'; Chinn 26' 54'; Agudelo 69'	Report		Stadium: MSU Soccer Park

April 13, 2010 Friendly	New York Red Bulls	3–0	St. John's Red Storm	Montclair, New Jersey
11:00 EDT	Ibrahim 25' (pen.); Boyens 26'; Chinn 50'	(Report)		Stadium: MSU Soccer Park

May 23, 2010 Friendly	New York Red Bulls	3–1	Juventus	Harrison, New Jersey
13:00 EDT	Hall 50'; Chinn 55'; Ángel 75'	(Report)	(yellow card) 65' Brandão; 90' Amauri	Stadium: Red Bull Arena; Attendance: 18,735

June 18, 2010 Friendly	New York Red Bulls	2–4	Cruzeiro	Harrison, New Jersey
20:00 EDT	Ángel 32'; Chinn 76'	(Report)	7' 51' Ribeiro; 35' Wellington Paulista; 46' Caçapa	Stadium: Red Bull Arena; Attendance: 7,680; Referee: Geoff Gamble

July 22, 2010 Barclays New York Challenge	New York Red Bulls	1–2	Tottenham Hotspur	Harrison, New Jersey
20:00 EDT	Ream (yellow card) 16'; Henry 25'	(Report)	62' Keane; 72' Bale	Stadium: Red Bull Arena; Attendance: 20,312

July 25, 2010 Barclays New York Challenge	New York Red Bulls	2–1	Manchester City	Harrison, New Jersey
15:30 EDT	Kandji 7'; Hall (yellow card) 30'; Richards 70'	(Report)	55' Jô	Stadium: Red Bull Arena; Attendance: 23,228

=== MLS regular season ===
March 27, 2010 Week 1	New York	1–0	Chicago	Red Bull Arena, Harrison
19:00 EDT	Lindpere 40'	(Report)		Attendance: 24,572; Referee: Baldomero Toledo

April 3, 2010 Week 2	Seattle	0–1	New York	Qwest Field, Seattle
22:30 EDT	Ljunberg (yellow card) 10'; Riley (yellow card) 63'	(Report)	21' (yellow card) 62'Kandji; (yellow card) 35' Petke	Attendance: 36,066; Referee: Kevin Stott

April 10, 2010 Week 3	Chivas USA	2–0	New York	Home Depot Center, Carson
16:00 EDT	Coundol 47' (o.g.); Padilla (yellow card) 89' (goal) 90+1'	(Report)	(yellow card) 18' Petke	Attendance: 12,597; Referee: Paul Ward

April 17, 2010 Week 4	New York	2–1	FC Dallas	Red Bull Arena, Harrison
19:30 EDT	Ángel 56' 90' (pen.)	(Report)	10' McCarty; (yellow card) 24' Harris	Attendance: 13,667; Referee: Alex Prus

April 24, 2010 Week 5	New York	2–1	Philadelphia	Red Bull Arena, Harrison
16:00 EDT	Salou 50'; Ángel 65' (pen.); Petke (yellow card) 69'	(Report)	59' Le Toux	Attendance: 15,619; Referee: Kevin Stott

May 1, 2010 Week 6	D.C. United	0–2	New York	RFK Stadium, Washington, D.C.
16:00 EDT	Quaranta (yellow card) 39'	(Report)	(yellow card) 34' Petke; 51' Salou; 60' Ángel	Attendance: 12,089; Referee: Edvin Jurisevic

May 8, 2010 Week 7	San Jose	4–0	New York	Buck Shaw Stadium, Santa Clara
22:00 EDT	Convey (yellow card) 43'; Johnson 44'; Gjertsen 54'; Wondolowski 76'; Burling 85'	(Report)	(yellow card) 3' Tchani; (red card) 12' Sassano	Attendance: 9,711; Referee: Andrew Chapin

May 15, 2010 Week 8	New York	0–1	Seattle	Red Bull Arena, Harrison
19:30 EDT	Hall (yellow card) 35'; Borman (yellow card) 39'; Stammler (yellow card) 71'	(Report)	(yellow card) 71' Marshall; 85' Montero; (yellow card) 90+2' Zakuani	Attendance: 17,900; Referee: Silviu Petrescu

May 20, 2010 Week 9	New York	1–3	Columbus	Red Bull Arena, Harrison
20:00 EDT	Stammler (yellow card) 75'; Tchani 81'; Ream (yellow card) 85'	(Report)	35' Gaven; 39' (yellow card) 60' Iro; (yellow card) 51' Moffat; 83' Rentería	Attendance: 11,940; Referee: Baldomero Toledo

May 29, 2010 Week 10	New England	3–2	New York	Gillette Stadium, Foxborough
20:00 EDT	Perović 8'; Ream 20' (o.g.); Schilawski 80'	(Report)	20' Stammler; (yellow card) 44' (yellow-red card) 56' Mendes; 49' Ángel; (red card) 75' Miller	Attendance: 11,316; Referee: Andrew Chapin

June 2, 2010 Week 11	New York	2–1	Houston	Red Bull Arena, Harrison
19:30 EDT	Ubiparipović 14'; Borman (yellow card) 32'; Albright (yellow card) 40'; Hall (yellow card) 59'; Petke (yellow card) 75'; Ángel 90+4'	(Report)	(yellow card) 13' Mulrooney; (yellow card) 28' Robinson; (yellow card) 40' Mullan; 65' Ching; (yellow card) 89' Palmer	Attendance: 11,462; Referee: Hilario Grajeda

June 5, 2010 Week 12	New York	1–0	Chivas USA	Red Bull Arena, Harrison
19:30 EDT	Stammler 27'	(Report)	(yellow card) 73' Delgado; (yellow card) 74' Romero	Attendance: 18,815; Referee: Terry Vaughn

June 26, 2010 Week 13	Kansas City	0–3	New York	CommunityAmerica Ballpark, Kansas City
20:30 EDT	Conrad (yellow card) 43'; Zusi (yellow card) 79'; Arnaud (red card) 90+3'	(Report)	(yellow card) 43' Lindpere; 55' Ibrahim; 82' 90' Ángel	Attendance: 10,385; Referee: Ricardo Salazar

July 4, 2010 Week 14	Colorado	1–1	New York	Dick's Sporting Goods Park, Commerce City
21:00 EDT	Cummings 15' (yellow card) 71'; Clark (yellow card) 87'	(Report)	34' Ángel; (yellow card) 67' Stammler	Attendance: 18,363; Referee: Baldomero Toledo

July 10, 2010 Week 15	New York	0–0	D.C. United	Red Bull Arena, Harrison
19:30 EDT	Ibrahim (yellow card) 51'	(Report)		Attendance: 16,239; Referee: Silviu Petrescu

July 17, 2010 Week 16	Columbus	2–0	New York	Crew Stadium, Columbus
19:30 EDT	Rentería 20'; Carroll 48'; Hejduk (red card) 89'	(Report)	(yellow card) 10' Mendes	Attendance: 14,378; Referee: Abbey Okulaja

July 31, 2010 Week 17	Houston	2–2	New York	Robertson Stadium, Houston
20:30 EDT	Davis 24'; Palmer (red card) 44'; Mullan 89'	(Report)	10' 58' Ángel; (yellow card) 59' Lindpere; (yellow card) 71' Richards; (yellow card) 85' Miller	Attendance: 24,750; Referee: Paul Ward

August 8, 2010 Week 18	Chicago	0–0	New York	Toyota Park, Bridgeview
21:00 EDT	Husidić (yellow card) 31'	(Report)	(yellow card) 32' Ream; (yellow card) 80' Mendes	Attendance: 21,868; Referee: Baldomero Toledo

August 11, 2010 Week 19	New York	1–0	Toronto FC	Red Bull Arena, Harrison
19:30 EDT	Lindpere 23'	(Report)	(yellow card) 56' de Guzman; (yellow card) 90+4' Mista	Attendance: 19,035; Referee: Ricardo Salazar

August 14, 2010 Week 20	New York	0–1	Los Angeles	Red Bull Arena, Harrison
18:00 EDT	Ángel (yellow card) 59'; Miller (yellow card) 76'	(Report)	10' Buddle	Attendance: 25,000; Referee: Mark Geiger

August 21, 2010 Week 21	Toronto FC	1–4	New York	BMO Field, Toronto, Canada
13:00 EDT	De Rosario 49'; Attakora (red card) 60'	(Report)	(yellow card) 14' Mendes; 35' (yellow card) 37' Márquez; 41' (o.g.) Nane; 61' (pen.) Ángel; (yellow card) 72' Ibrahim; 77' Robinson	Attendance: 22,108; Referee: Jair Marrufo

August 28, 2010 Week 22	New York	2–0	San Jose	Red Bull Arena, Harrison
19:30 EDT	Richards (yellow card) 38' (goal) 45+1'; Henry 63'; Lindpere (yellow card) 75'; Tchani (yellow card) 81'	(Report)	(yellow card) 6' Burling; (yellow card) 56' Convey	Attendance: 21,859; Referee: Silviu Petrescu

September 4, 2010 Week 23	Real Salt Lake	1–0	New York	Rio Tinto Stadium, Sandy
21:00 EDT	Espíndola 4'; Olave (yellow card) 39'	(Report)	(yellow card) 18' Tchani; (yellow card) 38' Borman; (yellow card) 74' Stammler	Attendance: 19,115; Referee: Ricardo Salazar

September 11, 2010 Week 24	New York	3–1	Colorado	Red Bull Arena, Harrison
16:00 EDT	Henry 17'; Albright (yellow card) 30'; Ream 32'; Richards 58'	(Report)	(yellow card) 10' Wallace; (yellow card) 27' Smith; 52' Cummings; (yellow card) 70' Thompson	Attendance: 19,014; Referee: Baldomero Toledo

September 16, 2010 Week 25	FC Dallas	2–2	New York	Pizza Hut Park, Frisco
21:00 EDT	Rodríguez 24'; Shea (red card) 29'; Alexander 68'; Chávez (yellow card) 86'	(Report)	45+3' (yellow card) 90+4' Ballouchy; (yellow card) 41' Miller; (yellow card) 47' Henry; 82' (o.g.) Benítez	Attendance: 15,105; Referee: Hilario Grajeda

September 24, 2010 Week 26	Los Angeles	0–2	New York	Home Depot Center, Carson
23:00 EDT	DeLaGarza (yellow card) 57'; Marshall (yellow card) 59'; Beckham (yellow card) 86'	(Report)	36' Richards; 60' (pen.) Ángel	Attendance: 27,000; Referee: Ricardo Salazar

October 2, 2010 Week 27	New York	1–0	Kansas City	Red Bull Arena, Harrison
19:30 EDT	Richards 6'; Miller (yellow card) 38'; Mendes (yellow card) 46'; Ballouchy (yellow card) 54'	(Report)		Attendance: 24,799; Referee: Edvin Jurisevic

October 9, 2010 Week 28	New York	0–0	Real Salt Lake	Red Bull Arena, Harrison
16:00 EDT	Albright (yellow card) 38'; Miller (yellow card) 43'	(Report)	(yellow card) 38' Olave; (yellow card) 39' Beltran	Attendance: 20,829; Referee: Jair Marrufo

October 16, 2010 Week 29	Philadelphia	2–1	New York	PPL Park, Chester
18:00 EDT	Fred 8' (yellow card) 67'; Fiscal 28'	(Report)	(yellow card) 18' (goal) 48' Borman; (yellow card) 55' Ángel	Attendance: 18,578; Referee: Paul Ward

October 21, 2010 Week 30	New York	2–0	New England	Red Bull Arena, Harrison
19:30 EDT	Richards 17'; Hall (yellow card) 74'; Lindpere 90+2'	(Report)	(yellow card) 39' Joseph; (yellow card) 65' Griffiths; (yellow card) 71' Mansally	Attendance: 15,866; Referee: Michael Kennedy

=== U.S. Open Cup ===
April 27, 2010 Qualification	New York Red Bulls (New Jersey)	2–1	(Pennsylvania) Philadelphia Union	Red Bull Arena, Harrison
20:00 EDT	Chinn 16' 41'; Borman (yellow card) 66'; Boyens (yellow card) 81'	(Report)	(yellow card) 31' Jacobson; 68' Le Toux; (yellow card) 76' Miglioranzi	Attendance: 3,015; Referee: (New Hampshire) Andrew Chapin

May 12, 2010 Qualification	New York Red Bulls (New Jersey)	3–0	(Massachusetts) New England Revolution	Harrison
20:00 EDT	Wolyniec 36' 64'; Ubiparipović 62'	(Report)	(yellow card) 88' Phelan	Stadium: Red Bull Arena; Attendance: 1,935; Referee: (Illinois) Shane Moody

May 26, 2010 Qualification	New York Red Bulls (New Jersey)	3–0	Colorado Rapids	Harrison
20:00 EDT	Wolyniec 11' 43'; Chinn 56'; Stammler (yellow card) 77'	(Report)	(yellow card) 12' Larentowicz; (yellow card) 54' Thompson; (red card) 86' Earls	Stadium: Red Bull Arena; Attendance: 2,637; Referee: (Connecticut) Niko Bratsis

June 29, 2010 Round of 16	Harrisburg City Islanders (Pennsylvania)	1–0 (a.e.t.)	(New Jersey) New York	Harrisburg
19:00 EDT	Oppong 117'	(Report)	(yellow card) 11' Chinn	Stadium: Skyline Sports Complex; Attendance: 1,868; Referee: (South Carolina) Alex Prus

=== MLS Cup Playoffs ===
==== Conference Semi-final ====
October 30, 2010 First Leg	San Jose Earthquakes	0–1	New York Red Bulls	Santa Clara, California
22:00 EDT	Wondolowski (yellow card) 65'	(Report)	(yellow card) 45+2' Ballouchy; 56' Lindpere; (yellow card) 71' Miller; (yellow card) 83' Coundoul	Stadium: Buck Shaw Stadium; Attendance: 10,525; Referee: Paul Ward

November 4, 2010 Second Leg	New York Red Bulls	1–3 (2–3 agg.)	San Jose Earthquakes	Harrison, New Jersey
20:00 EDT	Ángel 78'	(Report)	6' 76' Convey; (yellow card) 32' Corrales; (yellow card) 81' Busch; 81' Wondolowski	Stadium: Red Bull Arena; Attendance: 22,839; Referee: Mark Geiger

== Player statistics ==
=== Squad stats ===
				Total				MLS		U.S. Open Cup		
N	Pos.	Name	Nat.	GS	App	Gls	Min	App	Gls	App	Gls	Notes
18	GK	Coundoul	(Senegal)	27	27	-28	2430	27	-28			(−) means goals conceded
24	GK	Sutton	(Canada)	7	7	-3	660	3	-1	4	-2	(−) means goals conceded
2	DF	Talley	(United States)	1	1		40	1				
3	DF	Albright	(United States)	19	23		1705	20		3		
5	DF	Ream	(United States)	29	29	1	2560	28	1	1		
7	DF	Miller	(Costa Rica)	22	26		2023	24		2		
12	DF	Petke	(United States)	12	18		1212	16		2		
17	DF	Hall	(United States)	11	14		1093	11		3		
27	DF	Boyens	(New Zealand)	3	3		300			3		
32	DF	Sassano	(United States)	5	7		465	3		4		
44	DF	Mendes	(United States)	21	22		1785	19		3		
4	MF	Márquez	(Mexico)	8	8	1	617	8	1			
6	MF	Stammler	(United States)	18	23	2	1553	21	2	2		
8	MF	Ubiparipović	(Bosnia and Herzegovina)	14	21	2	1195	18	1	3	1	
10	MF	Ballouchy	(Morocco)	4	4	1	360	4	1			
11	MF	Borman	(South Africa)	14	20		1314	17		3		
13	MF	da Luz	(United States)		2		76			2		
19	MF	Richards	(Jamaica)	21	24	4	1850	23	4	1		
20	MF	Lindpere	(Estonia)	27	27	2	2387	27	2			
21	MF	Nielsen	(Denmark)	4	5		333	2		3		
23	MF	Tchani	(Cameroon)	19	29	1	1841	25	1	4		
33	MF	Robinson	(Wales)	3	10	1	365	10	1			
99	MF	García	(United States)	2	4		178			4		
9	FW	Ángel	(Colombia)	27	28	13	2413	28	13			
14	FW	Henry	(France)	11	11	2	801	11	2			
25	FW	Chinn	(United States)	4	9	3	419	5		4	3	
29	FW	Ibrahim	(Ghana)	7	17	3	613	17	3			
39	FW	Agudelo	(United States)	2	4		146	1		3		
—	FW	Wolyniec	(United States)	5	8	4	480	4		4	4	Retired
—	MF	Kandji	(Senegal)	8	13	1	792	13	1			Traded to Colorado

Last updated: November 13
Source: Stats
Ordered by position
0 shown as blank

=== Disciplinary records ===
N	Pos.	Nat.	Name	Yellow card	Second yellow card	Red card	Notes
18	GK	(Senegal)	Coundoul				
2	DF	(United States)	Talley				
3	DF	(United States)	Albright	3			
4	DF	(Mexico)	Márquez	1			
5	DF	(United States)	Ream	1			
7	DF	(Costa Rica)	Miller	5		1	
12	DF	(United States)	Petke	5			
17	DF	(United States)	Hall	3			
27	DF	(New Zealand)	Boyens	1			
32	DF	(United States)	Sassano			1	
44	DF	(United States)	Mendes	5	1		
6	MF	(United States)	Stammler	5			
8	MF	(Bosnia and Herzegovina)	Ubiparipović				
10	MF	(Morocco)	Ballouchy	2			
11	MF	(South Africa)	Borman	5			
19	MF	(Jamaica)	Richards	2			
20	MF	(Estonia)	Lindpere	3			
23	MF	(Cameroon)	Tchani	3			
9	FW	(Colombia)	Ángel	2			
14	FW	(France)	Henry	1			
25	FW	(United States)	Chinn	1			
29	FW	(Ghana)	Ibrahim	1			
—	FW	(United States)	Wolyniec				
—	MF	(Senegal)	Kandji	1			

Last updated: October 22
Source: Competitive matches
Only competitive matches
(yellow card) = Number of bookings; (second yellow card) = Number of sending offs after a second yellow card; (red card) = Number of sending offs by a direct red card.

== Recognition ==
=== MLS Player of the Week ===
Week	Player	Week's Statline
13	(Colombia) Juan Pablo Ángel	2G (82', 90')
18	(Colombia) Juan Pablo Ángel	2G (10', 58')
27	(Senegal) Bouna Coundoul	12 Saves, SO

=== MLS Goal of the Week ===
Week	Player	Goal	Report
13	(Colombia) Juan Pablo Ángel	90'	N/A
21	(Mexico) Rafael Márquez	35'	Márquez GOTW
22	(Jamaica) Dane Richards	45'+1	Richards GOTW

=== MLS Save of the Week ===
Week	Player	Save	Report
27	(Senegal) Bouna Coundoul	58'	Coundoul SOTW

=== MLS All-Stars 2010 ===
Position	Player	Note
FW	(Colombia) Juan Pablo Ángel	Coach's Pick
MF	(Estonia) Joel Lindpere	Inactive Roster
