= 2010 Barclays New York Challenge =

Barclays New York Challenge
- 2010 Barclays New York Challenge official logo

Tournament details
- Host country: United States
- Dates: July 22 – July 25
- Teams: 4 (from 2 confederations)
- Venue: 1 (in 1 host city)

Final positions
- Champions: (Portugal) Sporting CP (1st title)
- Runners-up: (England) Tottenham Hotspur
- Third place: (United States) New York Red Bulls
- Fourth place: (England) Manchester City

Tournament statistics
- Matches played: 4
- Goals scored: 12 (3 per match)
- Top scorer(s): (Portugal) Yannick Djaló (Republic of Ireland) Robbie Keane (2 goals)

The 2010 Barclays New York Challenge was an exhibition international club football (soccer) competition which featured football club teams from Europe and North America, and was held in July 2010. All matches were played in Red Bull Arena in Harrison, New Jersey in the United States. The tournament is part of the World Series of Soccer. Sporting CP emerged as the 2010 Barclays New York Challenge winners. Robbie Keane was named the Barclays Player of the Tournament with two goals and one assist.

== Teams ==
The following four clubs participated in the 2010 tournament:

- (United States) New York Red Bulls from Major League Soccer.
- (England) Tottenham Hotspur from the Premier League.
- (England) Manchester City from the Premier League.
- (Portugal) Sporting CP from the Portuguese Liga.

== Sponsors ==
- Voss
- Barclays

== Stadium ==
The newly built Red Bull Arena hosted all four games. Owned by Red Bull GmbH, the stadium has 25,189 seats. The record attendance was during a match between the Red Bulls and Brazilian club Santos FC in March 2010 with 25,000.

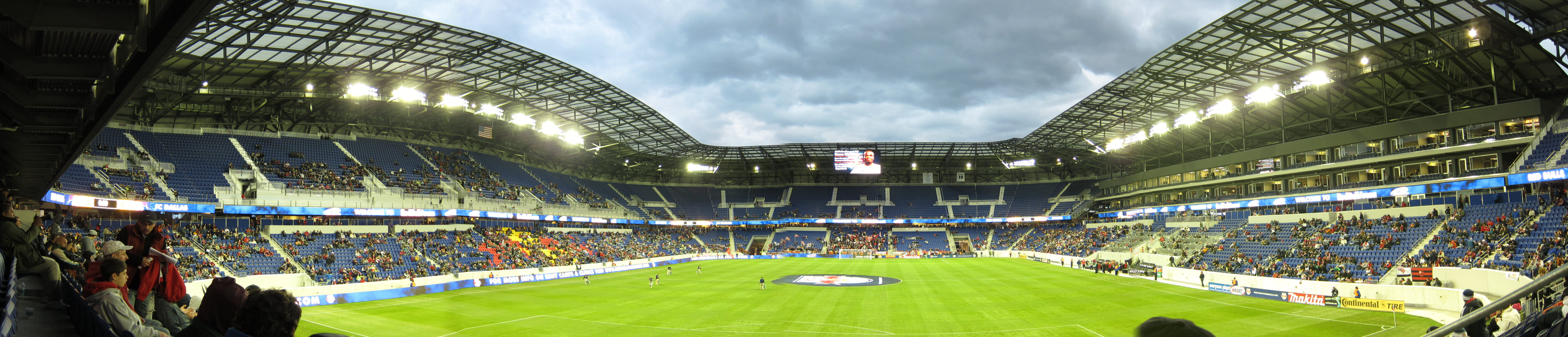
Red Bull Arena internal view

== Players ==
Manchester City's newest signing Yaya Touré made his club debut against Sporting while Thierry Henry of the New York Red Bulls also made his club debut against Tottenham Hotspur. Henry scored his first ever goal for New York from a cross by Joel Lindpere.

Other notable players in the tournament included Roman Pavlyuchenko, Robbie Keane, Maniche, Patrick Vieira and Matías Fernández.

== Rules ==
Clubs received one point for each goal scored in regulation. Clubs earned three points for a win. Total goals scored was the first tiebreaker, than fewest goals conceded, then fastest goal scored. The team with the highest overall number of points determined the 2010 Barclays New York Challenge winner.

== Matches ==
The schedule for the tournament.

=== Day 1 ===
July 22
20:00 EST

New York Red Bulls (United States)	1 – 2	(England) Tottenham Hotspur
Ream (yellow card) 16'; Henry 25'	(Report)	61' Keane; 71' Bale

Red Bull Arena, Harrison, New Jersey
Attendance: 20,312

=== Day 2 ===
July 23
20:00 EST

Manchester City (England)	0 – 2	(Portugal) Sporting CP
	(Report)	23' 39' Yannick; (yellow card) 43' D. Carriço

Red Bull Arena, Harrison, New Jersey
Referee: Kevin Scott

=== Day 3 ===
July 25
13:00 EST

Tottenham Hotspur (England)	2 – 2	(Portugal) Sporting CP
Keane 24'; Obika 70'	(Report)	25' Fernández; (yellow card) 39' Liédson; 48' Valdés; (yellow card) 86' João Pereira

Red Bull Arena, Harrison, New Jersey
Referee: Steven Depiero

July 25
15:30 EST

New York Red Bulls (United States)	2 – 1	(England) Manchester City
Kandji 7'; Hall (yellow card) 30'; Richards 70'	(Report)	55' Jô

Red Bull Arena, Harrison, New Jersey
Attendance: 23,228

== Standings ==
Team	Pld	W	D	L	GF	GA	GD	Pts
(Portugal) Sporting CP (C)	2	1	1	0	4	2	+2	8
(England) Tottenham Hotspur	2	1	1	0	4	3	+1	8
(United States) New York Red Bulls	2	1	0	1	3	2	+1	6
(England) Manchester City	2	0	0	2	1	4	−3	1

(C) Champions

== Statistical leaders ==
=== Top scorers ===
Rank	Scorer	Club	Goals
1	(Portugal) Yannick Djaló	Sporting CP	2
	(Republic of Ireland) Robbie Keane	Tottenham Hotspur	2
2	(Brazil) Jô	Manchester City	1
	(France) Thierry Henry	New York Red Bulls	1
	(Senegal) Macoumba Kandji	New York Red Bulls	1
	(Jamaica) Dane Richards	New York Red Bulls	1
	(Chile) Matías Fernández	Sporting CP	1
	(Chile) Jaime Valdés	Sporting CP	1
	(Wales) Gareth Bale	Tottenham Hotspur	1
	(England) Jonathan Obika	Tottenham Hotspur	1

=== Top assists ===
Rank	Player	Club	Assists
1	(Republic of Ireland) Greg Cunningham	Manchester City	1
	(Estonia) Joel Lindpere	New York Red Bulls	1
	(Senegal) Macoumba Kandji	New York Red Bulls	1
	(Jamaica) Dane Richards	New York Red Bulls	1
	(Montenegro) Simon Vukčević	Sporting CP	1
	(Portugal) Diogo Salomão	Sporting CP	1
	(Republic of Ireland) Robbie Keane	Tottenham Hotspur	1
	(Croatia) Niko Kranjčar	Tottenham Hotspur	1
