= Brian Nielsen =

Brian Nielsen may refer to:

- Brian Nielsen (boxer) (born 1965), Danish boxer
- Brian Nielsen (footballer) (born 1987), Danish footballer for New York Red Bulls
- Brian Steen Nielsen (born 1968), Danish former footballer for Aarhus GF
