= Erik Solér =

Norwegian footballer (born 1960)

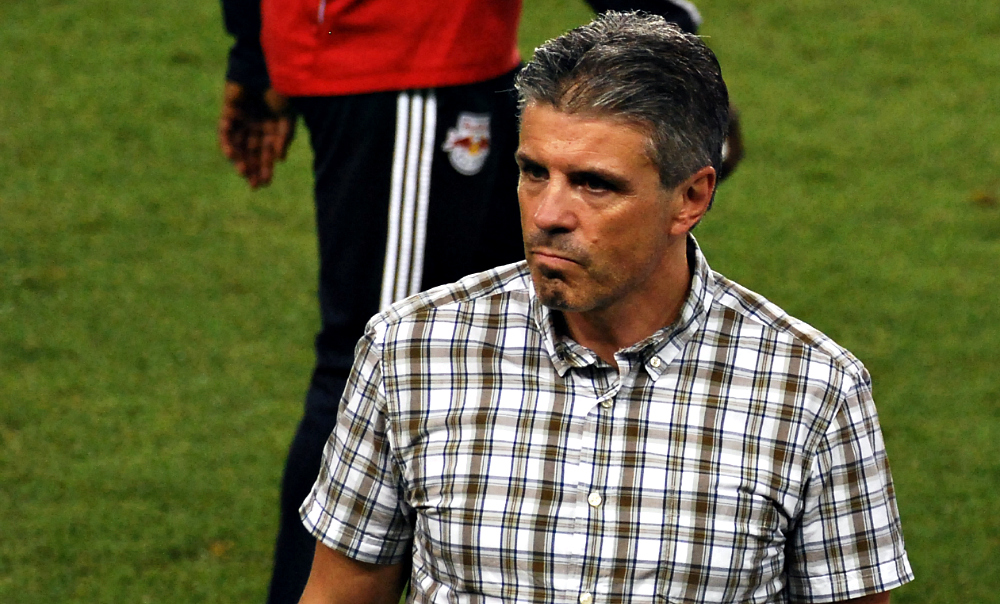
- Solér in 2011

Personal information
- Full name: Erik Francisco Solér
- Date of birth: 6 August 1960 (age 66)
- Place of birth: Lillestrøm, Norway
- Height: 1.63 m (5 ft 4 in)
- Position: Right midfielder

Senior career*
Years	Team	Apps	(Gls)
1979–1983	Lillestrøm SK	97	(9)
1984	Eik-Tønsberg	8	(2)
1984–1985	Hamburger SV	25	(0)
1986–1987	SK Brann	21	(0)
1987–1988	AGF Aarhus		
1989–1990	Lillestrøm SK	16	(0)

International career
1982–1988	Norway	39	(4)
- * Club domestic league appearances and goals

Erik Francisco Solér (born 6 August 1960) is a Norwegian former professional footballer, a former football agent, and former general manager and sporting director of New York Red Bulls as well as a football commentator for Champions League and national team games on Norwegian TV on a part-time basis. He is educated as a psychologist.

== Club career ==
Born in Lillestrøm, Solér started his career with Lillestrøm SK, playing as a midfielder the first few years and later as a right-back. He left the club for a short stay in Eik-Tønsberg, until he was transferred to the German club Hamburger SV. After one and a half season in HSV, he returned to Norway, signing for SK Brann. In 1988, he became Danish Cup winner playing for AGF Aarhus, scoring a decisive goal in the final against Brøndby IF and Peter Schmeichel. His short stay in Denmark was followed by a second stay in Lillestrøm. Upon his return to Lillestrøm SK he helped the side capture the Norwegian First Division title in 1989, before retiring in 1990.

== International career ==
Solér earned 39 caps for the Norway national team. He made his debut with Norway in 1982. He earned his last cap for his country on 28 July 1988 in a 1–1 draw in Oslo against Brazil.

== Managerial career ==
In the late 1990s, after ending his career as a player, Solér co-founded International Sports Management (ISM) with Christian Eidem, who he had played with at AGF in Denmark. The company fast became one of Europe´s leading Football Management agencies. he was one of Norway's most important football agents, having Erik Mykland and Steffen Iversen, among others, as clients. He was a co-owner and the board-leader of the Norwegian football club IK Start from 2002 to 2008. During his tenure at IK Start the club won the Norwegian First Division in 2004 and were thus promoted to the Norwegian Premier League. The following season they ended the season with a surprising second place in Norwegian Premier League, just one season after being promoted. For this, Start earned a place in the 2006 UEFA Cup. Despite having several national team players Start was relegated in 2007. Start ran into financial problems and Soler left the club. The local government saved the club from bankruptcy.

On 25 November 2009, Solèr announced that he would be the next general manager and sporting director of the Major League Soccer club New York Red Bulls, it was confirmed by the club on 7 December 2009. During his first year in charge of New York, Solér helped transform the club from a last place team to a title contender, signing players like Roy Miller, Joel Lindpere, Thierry Henry, and Rafael Márquez.

In October 2012, Solèr was relieved of his duties.

== Honours ==
- Norwegian Cup: 1981
- Danish Cup: 1988
- Norwegian Championship: 1989
