= Seth Stammler =

American soccer player

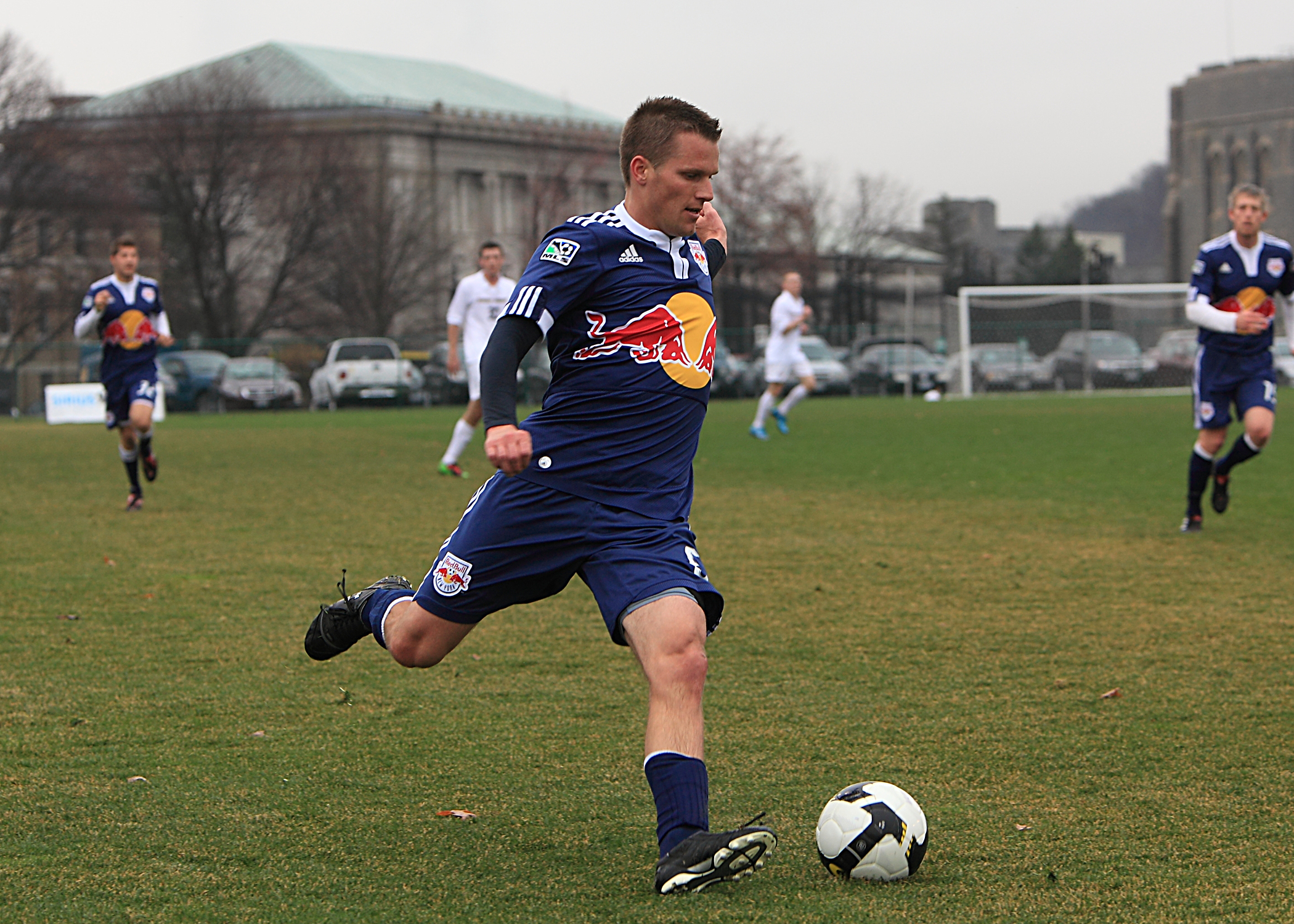
- Stammler playing for New York Red Bulls

Personal information
- Full name: Seth Matthew Stammler
- Date of birth: September 29, 1981 (age 45)
- Place of birth: Columbus, Ohio, United States
- Height: 5 ft 10 in (1.78 m)
- Position: Midfielder

College career
Years	Team	Apps	(Gls)
2000–2003	Maryland Terrapins	87	(8)

Senior career*
Years	Team	Apps	(Gls)
2004–2010	New York Red Bulls	142	(6)

International career
2003–2004	United States U23		
- * Club domestic league appearances and goals as of October 1, 2010

Seth Stammler (born September 29, 1981, in Columbus, Ohio) is an American former professional soccer player who spent his entire playing career with the New York Red Bulls in Major League Soccer.

== Career ==
=== College ===
Stammler attended Gahanna Middle School East and Gahanna Lincoln High School, and played four years of college soccer at the University of Maryland, captaining the team in his sophomore, junior, and senior seasons. He appeared in 87 matches for Maryland scoring 8 goals.

=== Professional ===
Stammler was selected 18th overall in the 2004 MLS SuperDraft by the MetroStars. However, during preseason, Stammler suffered an ankle injury that kept him out for much of the season. Joining the squad late in the year, Stammler registered only a minute of playing time as a rookie. He saw more playing time in his second season, and played effectively in left midfield in the playoffs.

The 2006 season saw Stammler establish himself as the club's starting left side midfielder. His versatility and overall solid play saw him appear in 29 matches (27 starts) in which he registered three goals and five assists. Stammler scored his first MLS goal May 20, 2006 with a long-range shot against Chivas USA. He added a header for his second goal in the same game in a 5-4 Red Bull win.

In 2007 Stammler began the season as the team's starting defensive midfielder. His tenacious play helped guide the club to an impressive start. Later in the season Stammler was shifted to defense due to his ability to play the ball out of the back. He concluded the campaign appearing in 29 matches (28 starts), registering two assists. In 2008 Stammler continued his solid play appearing in 26 matches and scoring one goal. He also served as the club's vice-captain, a role he continued to serve during the 2009 season in which he appeared in 26 league matches. In 2008 Stammler scored against Barcelona in a 6–2 loss.

During the 2010 campaign coach Hans Backe decided to take advantage of Stammler's versatility utilizing him as a left sided midfielder as well as in his familiar role of a holding midfielder. On June 5, 2010, Stammler helped New York to a 1–0 victory over Chivas USA scoring on a long-range shot reminiscent of the goal he scored against Chivas in 2006 which was his first MLS goal.

In September 2010, Stammler announced that he would be retiring at the close of the 2010 season to attend The University of Chicago Booth School of Business. Seth Stammler is now employed by Morgan Stanley and works on the municipal bond desk.

=== International ===
During his days as a college player Stammler played with the U.S. Under-23 in Portugal as a defender. In 2008 in an interview Stammler said former USA national team captain Claudio Reyna mentioned his name to Bob Bradley but a call up never came.

== Personal ==
Stammler is involved with a non-profit organization named The Sporting Chance Foundation . The foundation aims to help Haitian children gain access to education, and provides clean water through building community water wells.

== Honors ==
=== Club ===
New York Red Bulls

- MLS Cup
  - Runners-up (1): 2008
- MLS Eastern Conference
  - Winners (Regular Season) (1): 2010
- MLS Western Conference
  - Winners (Playoff) (1): 2008
- Minor Trophies
  - Atlantic Cup (2): 2003, 2010
  - La Manga Cup (1): 2004
  - Walt Disney World Pro Soccer Classic (1): 2010

=== Individual ===
- MLS Humanitarian of the Year: 2010

== Career statistics ==
Club	Season	Major League Soccer		US Open Cup		MLS Cup		CONCACAF		Total
Club	Season	App	Goals	App	Goals	App	Goals	App	Goals	App	Goals
New York Red Bulls	2004	1	0	1	0	0	0	-	-	2	0
New York Red Bulls	2005	10	0	1	0	2	0	-	-	13	0
New York Red Bulls	2006	29	3	2	1	2	0	-	-	33	4
New York Red Bulls	2007	29	0	1	0	2	0	-	-	32	0
New York Red Bulls	2008	26	1	-	-	-	-	-	-	26	1
New York Red Bulls	2009	26	0	-	-	-	-	2	0	28	0
New York Red Bulls	2010	21	2	2	0			-	-	23	2
	Club Total	142	6	7	1	6	0	2	0	157	7
