= Göran Aral =

Swedish footballer (born 1953)

Personal information
- Full name: Göran Timur Aral
- Date of birth: 3 July 1953 (age 73)
- Place of birth: Sweden

Senior career*
Years	Team	Apps	(Gls)
1975	Djurgården	1	(0)

Managerial career
- Djurgården (ass. coach)
- 1991–1992: Älvsjö AIK
- 2010: New York Red Bulls (ass. coach)
- * Club domestic league appearances and goals

Göran Timur Aral (born 3 July 1953) is a Swedish former football defender, coach and director.

== Career ==
Göran Aral was born in Sweden in 1953 and is a product of the Djurgården youth system. At the beginning of the 1970s he was considered such a promising player that he was selected to go to London and train with Chelsea. He made his sole Allsvenskan appearance for Djurgården in the 1975 Allsvenskan against Halmstads BK. However, a serious injury ended his career in 1977 at the age of 24.

Aral was a Djurgården staff in the 1980s together with Tommy Söderberg and Benny Persson, also coached Råsunda IS before taking over Älvsjö AIK in late 1990. He left Älvsjö AIK after two seasons in 1992.

Aral served at Djurgården in a number of capacities and was on the management team since the late 1990s. During this time, Aral was part of Allsvenskan-winning teams in 2002 and 2003. In 2004, he left Djurgården to work with the Swedish Football Association and remained there until 2008 when he returned to Djurgården to serve as technical director.

During the 2010 season he was hired by New York Red Bulls to serve as an assistant coach under fellow Swede Hans Backe. He was hired to assist with the first-team and to oversee the club's academy system. At the end of the 2010 season, Aral left the club and was eventually replaced by Jan Halvor Halvorsen.
