= 2010 Walt Disney World Pro Soccer Classic =

Tournament details
- Host country: United States
- Dates: February 25–27
- Teams: 4
- Venue(s): 1 (in 1 host city)

Final positions
- Champions: (United States) New York Red Bulls (1st title)
- Runners-up: (Canada) Toronto FC
- Third place: (United States) Houston Dynamo

Tournament statistics
- Matches played: 4
- Goals scored: 8 (2 per match)
- Top scorer(s): (Colombia) Juan Pablo Ángel (3 goals)

The 2010 Walt Disney World Pro Soccer Classic was a preseason soccer tournament held at Walt Disney World's ESPN Wide World of Sports Complex. The tournament, the inaugural edition of the Pro Soccer Classic, was held from February 25 to 27 and featured four Major League Soccer clubs.

The tournament was won by the New York Red Bulls, who defeated Toronto FC 4–0 in the final.

== Teams ==
The following four clubs competed in the tournament:

- (United States) New York Red Bulls from Major League Soccer (1st appearance)
- (Canada) Toronto FC from Major League Soccer (1st appearance)
- (United States) FC Dallas from Major League Soccer (1st appearance)
- (United States) Houston Dynamo from Major League Soccer (1st appearance)

== Matches ==
=== Semi-finals ===
February 25

Houston Dynamo (United States)	0–0 (a.e.t.)	(United States) New York Red Bulls
	Report
Penalties
Barrett (penalty scored); Oduro (penalty scored); Cruz (penalty scored); Maciel (penalty scored); Ustruck (penalty scored); Cameron (penalty missed)	5–6	(penalty scored) Ángel; (penalty scored) Lindpere; (penalty scored) Ubiparipović; (penalty scored) Ream; (penalty scored) Miller; (penalty scored) da Luz

ESPN Wide World of Sports Complex, Bay Lake, Florida, United States

February 25

Toronto FC (Canada)	1–0	(United States) FC Dallas
Kayizzi 16'	Report

ESPN Wide World of Sports Complex, Bay Lake, Florida, United States

=== Championship Round ===
==== Consolation match ====
February 27

Houston Dynamo (United States)	2–1	(United States) FC Dallas
Palmer 16'; Weaver 53'	Report	13' Ferreira

ESPN Wide World of Sports Complex, Bay Lake, Florida, United States

==== Final ====
February 27

New York Red Bulls (United States)	4–0	(Canada) Toronto FC
Angel 32', 37', 49'; Chinn 85'	Report

ESPN Wide World of Sports Complex, Bay Lake, Florida, United States
