= Luke Sassano =

American former soccer player (born 1985)

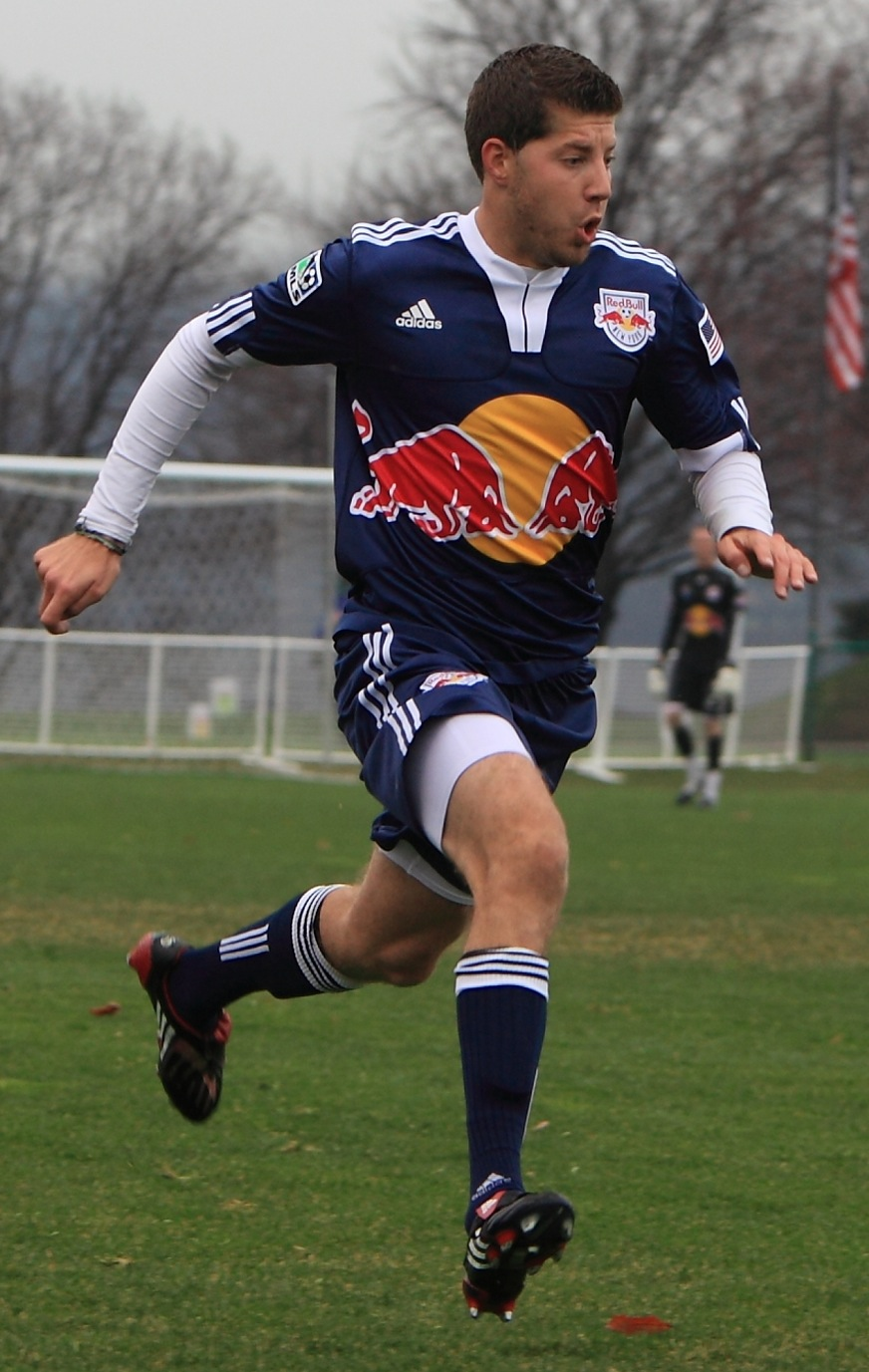
- Sassano with New York Red Bulls in 2010

Personal information
- Full name: Luke Stephan Sassano
- Date of birth: October 14, 1985 (age 41)
- Place of birth: Orinda, California, United States
- Height: 6 ft 1 in (1.85 m)
- Positions: Defender; midfielder

Youth career
- 2004–2007: California Golden Bears

Senior career*
Years	Team	Apps	(Gls)
2006	San Francisco Seals	12	(2)
2007	San Jose Frogs	13	(0)
2008–2010	New York Red Bulls	38	(0)
2011–2012	Sporting Kansas City	10	(1)
- * Club domestic league appearances and goals as of September 26, 2012

Luke Stephan Sassano (born October 14, 1985, in Orinda, California) is an American former soccer player.

== Career ==
=== Youth and college ===
Sassano began his career at Lamorinda Soccer Club. He attended Miramonte High School in Orinda, California, and played college soccer at the University of California, Berkeley. He was an All-Pac-10 Honorable Mention in 2005, a Pac-10 All-Academic Honorable Mention in 2007, and a Pac-10 1st Team in 2007. Sassano featured in a total of 64 games scoring four goals and registering 19 assists during his four-year career for the Golden Bears. During his college years Sassano also played for USL Premier Development League sides San Francisco Seals and San Jose Frogs.

=== Professional ===
Sassano was drafted with the 32nd pick of the 2008 MLS SuperDraft by New York Red Bulls and made his debut on 5 April 2008 in a home game against Columbus Crew. He was a valuable member of the squad in 2008 as his versatility enabled him to receive significant playing time in his rookie campaign. With the injury to starting defensive midfielder Seth Stammler, Sassano was inserted into the starting lineup for the club's first round MLS Playoff series against the defending champion Houston Dynamo. Sassano's defensive play helped the club upset heavily favored Houston 4–1 on aggregate, helping the club reach the Western Conference Final.

During his second season, Sassano featured in 17 regular season games playing primarily as a defensive midfielder. Following the 2009 Major League Soccer season, Sassano went on a three-week training stint with sister club FC Red Bull Salzburg.

Sassano appeared in 3 matches in 2010 before having season-ending ankle reconstruction surgery. On December 15, 2010, Sassano was selected by Los Angeles Galaxy in Stage 2 of the Re-Entry draft and subsequently traded to Sporting Kansas City. He signed with Sporting KC on January 12, 2011. On June 12, 2011, he scored his first Major League Soccer goal in a 4–1 victory over FC Dallas. Sassano had season ending knee surgery on September 28, 2011. He re-signed with SKC on January 30, 2012. Sassano started off 2012 in promising fashion before being sidelined with his third extensive surgery in 2 years.

=== Post-professional ===
After multiple injuries, including two knee surgeries in 2012, Sassano chose to retire as a professional soccer player, but he wished to remain involved in the sport. On April 16, 2013, Sassano was named Assistant Sporting Director for the New York Cosmos. Along with scouting for talent both domestically and internationally, he is responsible for negotiating contracts and managing the roster.

On March 14, 2018, Sassano was named the technical director of FC Cincinnati during their final season in the United Soccer League. He was heavily involved with the planning and roster selection for FC Cincinnati as they moved up to Major League Soccer.

== Career statistics ==
All-time MLS club performance
Club	Season	Major League Soccer		US Open Cup		MLS Cup		CONCACAF		Total
Club	Season	App	Goals	App	Goals	App	Goals	App	Goals	App	Goals
New York Red Bulls	2008	18	0	1	0	4	0	–	–	23	0
New York Red Bulls	2009	17	0	2	0	–	–			19	0
New York Red Bulls	2010	3	0	4	0	–	–	–	–	7	0
Sporting Kansas City	2011	9	1	3	0					12	1
Club Total		47	1	10	0	4	0	–	–	61	1

== Honors ==
=== New York Red Bulls ===
- Major League Soccer Western Conference Championship (1): 2008
