= Brian Nielsen (footballer) =

Danish footballer (born 1987)

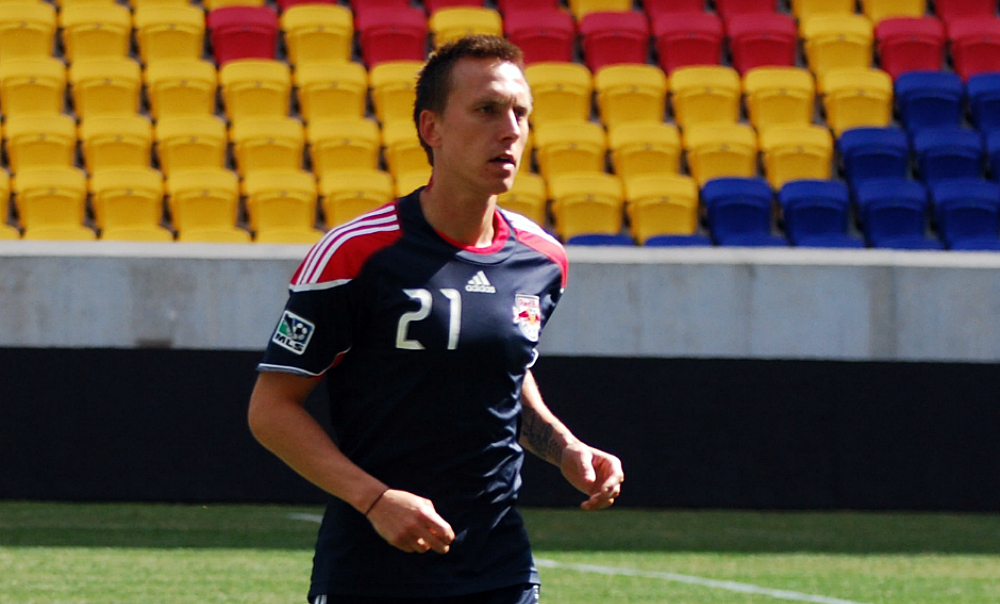

Personal information
- Date of birth: 25 February 1987 (age 39)
- Place of birth: Herlev, Denmark
- Height: 5 ft 11 in (1.80 m)
- Position: Midfielder

Youth career
- Hjorten
- Herlev
- –2004: AB

Senior career*
Years	Team	Apps	(Gls)
2004–2005	AB	28	(2)
2005–2010	Vejle	92	(17)
2010	→ New York Red Bulls (loan)	2	(0)
2011	Red Bull Salzburg	0	(0)
2011	→ New York Red Bulls (loan)	1	(0)
2015–2020	VB 1968	85	(?)

International career^{‡}
2002	Denmark U-16	3	(1)
2003–2004	Denmark U-17	14	(0)
2004–2005	Denmark U-18	3	(1)
2005–2006	Denmark U-19	15	(1)
2006	Denmark U-20	5	(0)
2007–2008	Denmark U-21	9	(0)
- * Club domestic league appearances and goals as of 24 April 2010 ‡ National team caps and goals as of 11 October 2008

Brian Nielsen (born 25 February 1987) is a Danish retired footballer.

He has played 49 games for various Danish youth team selections, including nine matches for the Denmark national under-21 football team.

== Career ==
=== Club ===
Nielsen began his career in the youth ranks of small Danish clubs Hjorten IF and Herlev IF, before joining the youth ranks of Akademisk Boldklub (AB) in the second-tier Danish 1st Division. He played 28 first team games and scored two goals as a semi-professional for AB.

He was sold to 1st Division rivals Vejle Boldklub in September 2005, signing a full-time professional contract, and debuted in a 3–0 victory over former club AB on 19 September. In his first season with Vejle, he helped the club win the 2005-06 1st Division to gain promotion for the Danish Superliga championship. He played 23 of 33 games and scored one goal during the 2006–07 Superliga season, as the club were relegated to the 1st Division. Nielsen stayed with Vejle, and helped the team win the 2007-08 1st Division. He played 28 games and scored five goals in the 2008–09 Superliga, but could not keep the club from being relegated once more. In his time with Vejle, Nielsen appeared in 99 official matches scoring 20 goals.

With his contract expiring in December 2010, he was linked with the Danish clubs OB, FC Copenhagen and FC Midtjylland in November 2009. On 1 December 2009, it was announced that he was trialing with Schalke 04. Schalke manager Felix Magath said he could clearly see some perspective in the young winger, but an injury caused him to return to Denmark after a single training session.

On 14 April 2010, Nielsen was loaned out to US club New York Red Bulls. The deal was a cooperation between New York Red Bulls and Austrian club Red Bull Salzburg, with Nielsen scheduled to ultimately join Red Bull Salzburg on 1 January 2011, according to Salzburg official Christoph Freund. As the Austrian transfer window was already closed, a direct buy was not possible for Salzburg, with Nielsen instead moving to New York Red Bulls as the US transfer window was open until 15 April. Salzburg purchased Nielsen in 2010-11 and loaned him back to New York for the 2011 MLS season.

Having waited for the approval of his U.S. visa application, he was seen to make an instant impact by head coach Hans Backe. However, injuries limited Nielsen as he only appeared in two league matches for New York in 2010. Despite his injury setbacks it was decided that Nielsen would remain in New York for the 2011 season. His injuries continued throughout the entire 2011 MLS season.

Nielsen's contract with Red Bull Salzburg - and his associated loan to New York Red Bulls - expired on 31 December 2011. He trained with the club as a trialist during 2012 pre-season camp but was not offered a contract.

=== International ===
Nielsen has represented Denmark at every youth level from the Under-16 to the Under-21 side. He has played a total 49 youth internationals, beginning with his October 2002 debut for the Under-16s. He represented the Denmark national under-21 football team in nine games from June 2007 to October 2008.

== Honours ==
=== Club ===
- Vejle BK
  - Danish 1st Division: 2005-06, 2007-08
- New York Red Bulls
  - Eastern Conference regular season: 2010
