= Walt Disney World Pro Soccer Classic =

- Founded: 2010
- Teams: 8
- Current champions: Columbus Crew (1st title)
- Most championships: FC Dallas (1 title); New York Red Bulls (1 title); Vancouver Whitecaps FC (1 title); Montreal Impact (1 title); Columbus Crew (1 title)
- Broadcaster: ESPN3
- Website: Website
- 2014 Walt Disney World Pro Soccer Classic

The Walt Disney World Pro Soccer Classic is an annual preseason soccer tournament for clubs in North America. Hosted by Disney, it is contested at Hess Sports Fields' Field 17, part of the ESPN Wide World of Sports Complex in Lake Buena Vista, Florida. The tournament debuted with four teams in 2010 and is broadcast online by ESPN3.

Columbus Crew are the current holders of the trophy, having defeated Sporting KC 4–1 in an overall dominant performance, finishing the tournament 4–0–1.

== History ==
The inaugural event took place in 2010. Four Major League Soccer clubs—FC Dallas, Houston Dynamo, the New York Red Bulls, and Toronto FC were invited to participate in the weekend (Thursday through Saturday) knockout tournament. The tournament was held February 25–27, approximately one month before the regular season kicked off on March 25. The tournament's first match was a scoreless draw between New York and Houston, with New York advancing on penalty kicks. Toronto then defeated Dallas in the second semifinal. The championship and consolation matches were played on Saturday, February 27, with the Dynamo rallying past Dallas, 2–1, to clinch third place and the Red Bulls defeating Toronto, 4–0, to clinch the title.

The second edition featured expanded coverage, with the semifinals airing on MLSSoccer.com and the championship and consolation on ESPN3. Dallas, Toronto, and Houston returned from the inaugural edition; New York was replaced by host side, Orlando City, a recently relocated third division club playing in the USL Professional Division. In the opener, the hosts were upended by 2010 MLS Cup runner-up FC Dallas, 1–0, while Houston defeated Toronto, 3–2. In the consolation match, Orlando upset Toronto while FC Dallas earned their first-ever title with a 5–3 penalty kicks victory following a 1–1 draw.

For the 2012 edition, Disney has announced plans to expand the tournament to eight clubs. Unlike the previous knockout formats, there were two groups of four clubs playing a group stage from February 24 through March 1 with a consolation and championship on March 3. Also, for the first time it included a team from outside the United States and Canada league system with BK Häcken of Sweden's Allsvenskan joining returning clubs FC Dallas, Toronto FC, Houston, and hosts Orlando and newcomers Sporting Kansas City, Vancouver Whitecaps FC, and the Montreal Impact.

== Results ==
| Year | Champions | Runners-up | Third place | Fourth place |
|---|---|---|---|---|
| 2010 | New York Red Bulls | Toronto FC | Houston Dynamo | FC Dallas |
| 2011 | FC Dallas | Houston Dynamo | Orlando City | Toronto FC |
| 2012 | Vancouver Whitecaps FC | Toronto FC | FC Dallas | Houston Dynamo |
| 2013 | Montreal Impact | Columbus Crew | Sporting Kansas City | Toronto FC |
| 2014 | Columbus Crew | Sporting Kansas City | New York Red Bulls; Orlando City | |

=== By club ===
| Club | Titles | Runners-up |
|---|---|---|
| Columbus Crew SC | 1 | 1 |
| New York Red Bulls | 1 | 0 |
| FC Dallas | 1 | 0 |
| Vancouver Whitecaps FC | 1 | 0 |
| Montreal Impact | 1 | 0 |
| Toronto FC | 0 | 2 |
| Houston Dynamo | 0 | 1 |
| Sporting Kansas City | 0 | 1 |

== Future ==
In addition to the expansion to eight clubs for 2012, Disney envisions the tournament growing to encompass a combine where players aged 23 and under can make their case for MLS coaches and scouts along with providing a destination tournament for fans and families.

== Clubs ==
| Club | League |
|---|---|
| BK Häcken | Swedish Allsvenskan |
| Fluminense | Brazilian Série A |
| Montreal Impact | MLS |
| Orlando City | USL Pro |
| Philadelphia Union | MLS |
| Sporting Kansas City | MLS |
| Tampa Bay Rowdies | NASL |
| Vancouver Whitecaps FC | MLS |
