= Conor Chinn =

American soccer player

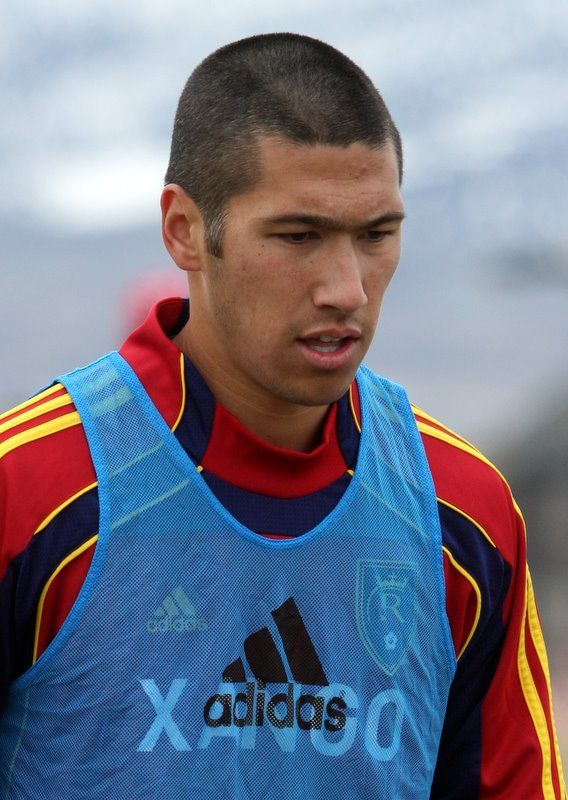

Personal information
- Full name: Conor Chinn
- Date of birth: August 29, 1987 (age 39)
- Place of birth: San Diego, California, United States
- Height: 6 ft 0 in (1.83 m)
- Position: Forward

College career
Years	Team	Apps	(Gls)
2006–2009	San Francisco Dons		

Senior career*
Years	Team	Apps	(Gls)
2009	Orange County Blue Star	5	(1)
2010	New York Red Bulls	5	(0)
2011	Real Salt Lake	0	(0)
2011	Atlanta Silverbacks	10	(0)
2012	Rochester Rhinos	14	(1)
- * Club domestic league appearances and goals as of September 1, 2012

Conor Chinn (born August 29, 1987, in La Jolla, California) is a former American soccer player.

== Career ==
=== College and amateur ===
Chinn first gained notoriety in high school, when he was featured in nationally aired commercials for StarKick. Following high school, Chinn attended Seattle University for one year before transferring to the University of San Francisco, where he played from 2006 to 2009. At San Francisco, he appeared in 78 games, scoring 37 goals and adding 12 assists.

During his college years, Chinn also played in the USL Premier Development League for Orange County Blue Star.

=== Professional ===
Chinn was drafted in the third round (34th overall) of the 2010 MLS SuperDraft by New York Red Bulls. He made his professional debut on April 3, 2010, as a late substitute in a game against Seattle Sounders FC.

On April 27, 2010, Chinn scored his first two goals for New York in a 2–1 victory over Philadelphia Union in a 2010 Lamar Hunt U.S. Open Cup qualification match. On May 23, 2010, Chinn scored New York's second goal in a 3–1 victory over Italian side Juventus FC in a friendly played at Red Bull Arena.

Chinn was waived by New York on March 1, 2011, having played in 5 MLS games for the team. He was then signed by Real Salt Lake on March 24, 2011, but was waived by RSL on May 27, 2011, having never made an MLS appearance for the team.

Chinn signed with the Atlanta Silverbacks of the North American Soccer League on June 10, 2011.

Chinn signed with USL Pro club Rochester Rhinos on December 19, 2011.

== Career statistics ==
All-time club performance
Club	Season	Major League Soccer		US Open Cup		MLS Cup		CONCACAF		Total
Club	Season	App	Goals	App	Goals	App	Goals	App	Goals	App	Goals
New York Red Bulls	2010	5	0	4	3	-	-	-	-	9	3
New York Red Bulls	Club Total	5	0	4	3	-	-	-	-	9	3
