= Macoumba Kandji =

Senegalese footballer

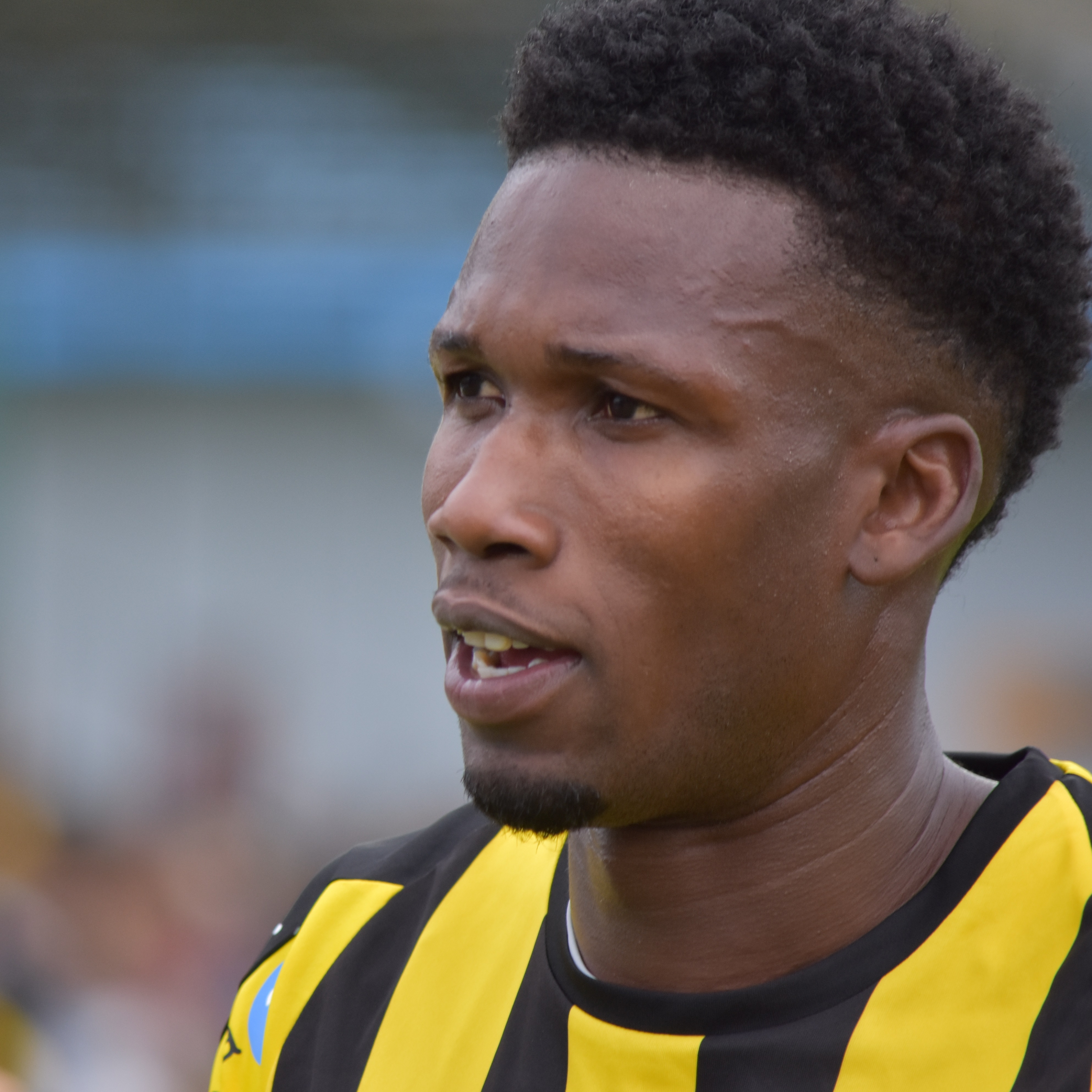
- Kandji with FC Honka in 2018.

Personal information
- Date of birth: 2 August 1985 (age 41)
- Place of birth: Dakar, Senegal
- Height: 6 ft 4 in (1.93 m)
- Positions: Forward; winger

College career
Years	Team	Apps	(Gls)
2004–2005	Georgia Military Bulldogs		

Senior career*
Years	Team	Apps	(Gls)
2006	Atlanta Silverbacks U23's	8	(1)
2007–2008	Atlanta Silverbacks	28	(13)
2008	→ New York Red Bulls (loan)	5	(1)
2009–2010	New York Red Bulls	36	(5)
2010–2011	Colorado Rapids	27	(2)
2012	Houston Dynamo	29	(4)
2013	AEL Kalloni	19	(6)
2013–2014	Levadiakos	12	(0)
2014	HJK	24	(6)
2015	Al-Faisaly	10	(2)
2015	HJK	5	(0)
2017	Inter Turku	25	(5)
2018	Honka	26	(16)
2019	Sanat Naft	6	(2)
2019–2020	Honka	21	(6)
2021–2022	Lahti	50	(8)
2023	SC Wiedenbrück	10	(2)
Total		336	(79)
- * Club domestic league appearances and goals

Macoumba "Mac" Kandji (born 2 August 1985) is a Senegalese former professional footballer who played as a forward or winger.

== Career ==
=== Early life and college ===
Kandji was born in Senegal, raised in The Gambia, and came to the United States in 2003. He attended East Mecklenburg High School in Charlotte, North Carolina, where he was voted MVP in 2003 as the Men's All-State Team forward, and played college soccer at Georgia Military College, where he was selected in the All-Region team in 2004 and 2005, scoring 17 goals and providing six assists during the 2005 season.

During 2006, Kandji also impressed while playing for Atlanta Silverbacks U23's in the USL Premier Development League, scoring one goal and one assist in eight games.

=== Professional ===
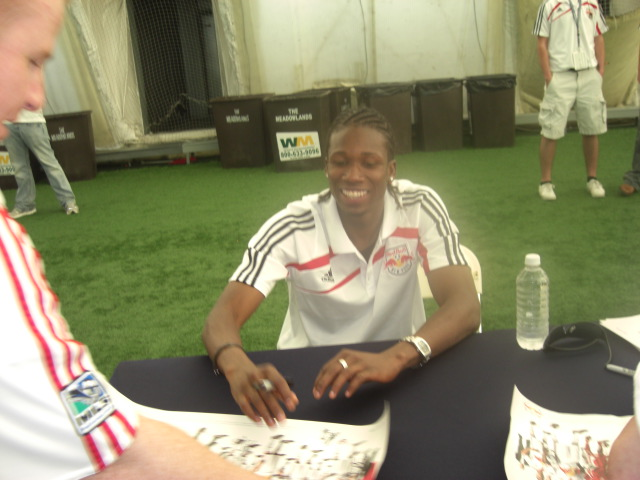
Kandji signing autographs during his time with the Red Bulls

Kandji joined the senior Atlanta Silverbacks team in 2007. He made his first team debut 4 August 2007 against Charleston Battery. From then on, he began to establish himself as one of the top players of the USL. During the 2008 season Kandji appeared in 21 league matches for Atlanta, registering 11 goals and five assists. He was named to the USL-1 Weekly Best 11 on six occasions, despite playing just one game in the final six weeks of the season due to an ankle injury.

Kandji finished the 2008 season ranked third in points (27 points, 21 games), though he missed nearly a third of the season due to injury, travel restrictions, and a loan to New York Red Bulls. During his time with the Silverbacks, Kandji was the main feature of an ESPN Soccernet article highlighting some of the USL's tops stars.

On 15 September 2008, Kandji signed with New York Red Bulls of Major League Soccer on loan through the end of the 2008 MLS season. This initial loan deal involved Red Bulls paying Atlanta Silverbacks a fee of $25,000. If the loan was a success, then another fee of $150,000 would be paid for Kandji, making the total amount paid $175,000. He made his MLS debut against Colorado Rapids on 27 September 2008, where he recorded an assist.

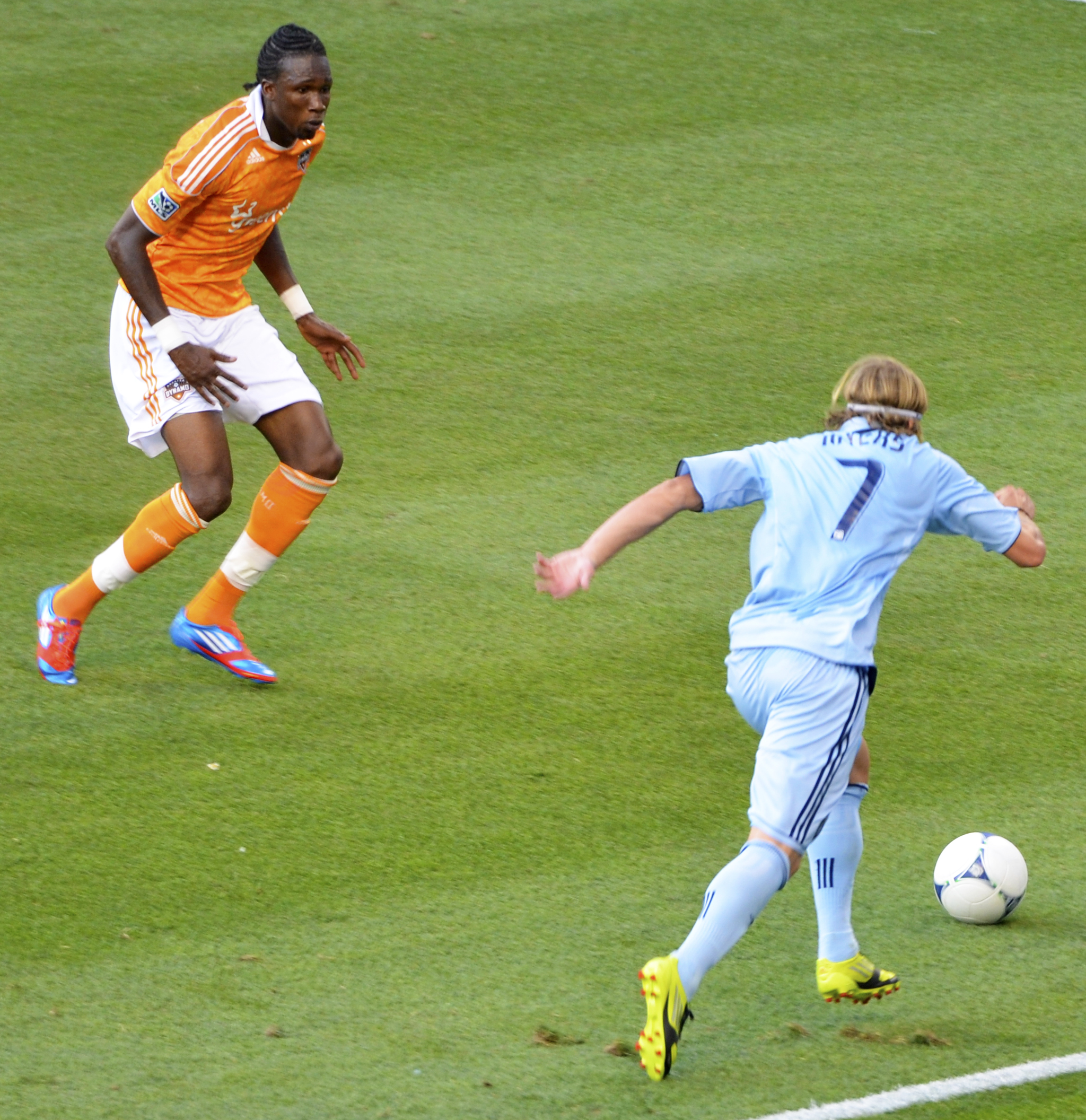
Kandji with the Houston Dynamo, against Chance Myers of Sporting KC

In November 2008, the Silverbacks announced that, due to financial reasons, they would be 'sitting out' the 2009 season. This development would have made Kandji a free agent, allowing New York to pick him up on a free transfer instead of the $175,000 previously agreed. However, Silverbacks owner Boris Jerkunica transferred his rights to Carolina Railhawks, a team he had a small stake in.

New York purchased his rights and signed him on a one-year deal on 14 January 2009. Kandji quickly established himself as a key performer for New York. His performance on 8 June 2009 in a 4–1 victory over San Jose Earthquakes, in which Kandji scored one goal and had two assists, led to him being named MLS player of the week. In his first full season with New York, Kandji appeared in 23 league matches scoring 4 goals and assisting on 5 others.

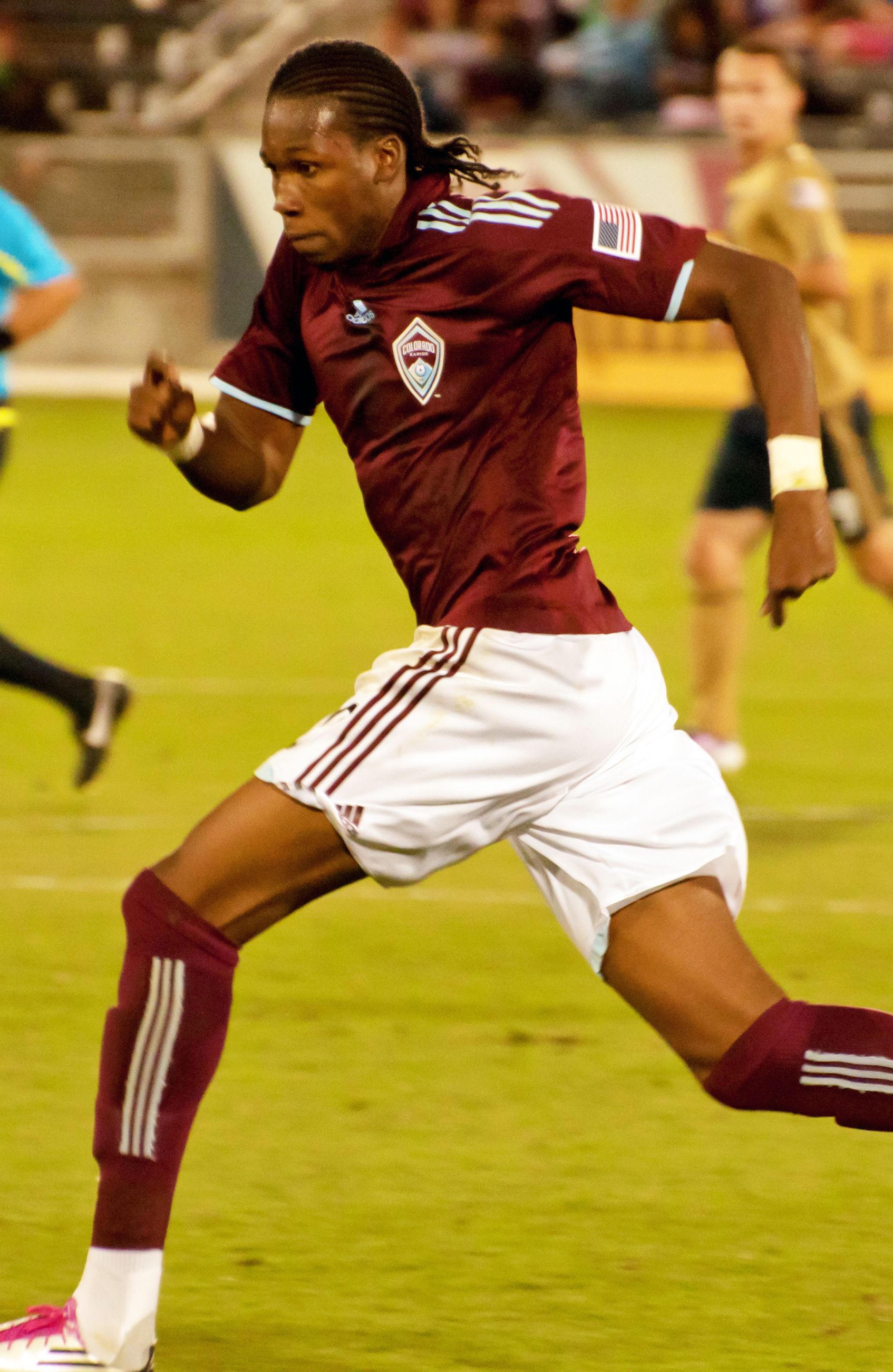
Kandji in 2010

On 25 July 2010 Kandji scored a goal and assisted Dane Richards on another in a 2–1 pre-season victory over Manchester City. It was also rumoured that Greece's Skoda Xanthi was interested in signing Kandji.

On 14 September 2010, Kandji was traded to Colorado Rapids for Mehdi Ballouchy and an international roster spot.

Kandji played an integral role in scoring the winning goal for Colorado Rapids during the 2010 MLS Cup final. His shot on goal was deflected off a defender, and though classified as an own-goal, it was his shot that resulted in the scoring opportunity. Kandji was also injured on this play; he suffered a torn anterior cruciate ligament. He underwent surgery to fix the torn ligament at the Hospital for Special Surgery in New York City with Doctor Riley Williams (head team physician for Kandji's former team, the New York Red Bulls).

Kandji was traded to Houston Dynamo on 8 February 2012 (to fill their void at the left wing position) in exchange for a conditional pick in the 2014 MLS SuperDraft. At year's end, Kandji declined a contract extension from Houston in pursuit of a European contract.

He signed with AEL Kalloni of the Greek Second Division on 28 January 2013. In 19 appearances with the club, Kandji bagged six goals in 1477 minutes played. Not only did he contribute with goals, Kandji helped the club gain promotion to the first division and earn a spot in the Super League Greece.

Although his club was promoted, Kandji announced he had changed clubs to Levadiakos of the Super League Greece (1st division) for the new Greek season 2013/2014. He signed a one-year contract.

In April 2014 Kandji signed a short-term contract with Finnish football club HJK Helsinki until August 2014 with an option to extend. On 12 April he scored a goal on his Veikkausliiga debut against KuPS. HJK qualified for the Europa League group stages 2014 with a 5–4 aggregate victory over SK Rapid Wien.

After spending a season in Saudi Arabia with Al-Faisaly, he rejoined HJK in July 2015 and said that it is "great to be back again".

On 5 May 2017, Kandji returned to the Finnish Veikkausliiga, signing with FC Inter Turku on a deal until the end of July, with an option for it to be extended until the end of the season.

In May 2018, Kandji joined FC Honka. He made his debut for Honka in an away game against RoPS on 3 May, and played an important role as he helped Honka grab their first win of the season by scoring a goal just five minutes after he came off the bench. He was then selected as the Veikkausliiga 'Player of the Month' for June and July 2018. In the end of August Kandji suffered a calf sprain and had to sit out a few games. That clearly made a difference to Kandji's game; in the last seven games he scored just twice. Eventually he went to claim the third spot in 'Most goals scored in Veikkausliiga 2018' with 16 scored goals. However, for FC Honka the season ended in a disappointing way, when Honka was left out of the top 3 by just the goal difference.

After the 2018 season in Espoo, Kandji agreed to sign with the Iranian Sanat Naft FC for the remaining three months of the season, which played in the Persian Gulf Pro League. He spent there just the time of 11 games, which from he played 6 of them. He scored two goals, but was left as a free agent in the end of May.

On 9 August 2019, Kandji made an expected return to Honka, when he agreed to a contract covering the remaining 2019 and the entire 2020 season.

=== International ===
Kandji has not yet appeared for any national team. Both Senegal and The Gambia have offered Kandji an opportunity to play, but Kandji turned them down in hopes of one day playing for the United States.

== Career statistics ==
As of match played 15 May 2015

Appearances and goals by club, season and competition
Club	Season	League			National cup		League cup		Continental		Other		Total	
Club	Season	Division	Apps	Goals	Apps	Goals	Apps	Goals	Apps	Goals	Apps	Goals	Apps	Goals
Atlanta Silverbacks	2007	USL First Division	7	2	0	0	–		0	0	5	0	12	2
Atlanta Silverbacks	2008	USL First Division	21	11	2	1	–		0	0	0	0	23	12
Atlanta Silverbacks	Total		28	13	2	1	0	0	0	0	5	0	35	14
New York Red Bulls (loan)	2008	MLS	5	1	0	0	–		0	0	2	0	7	1
New York Red Bulls	2009	MLS	23	4	1	0	–		0	0	0	0	24	4
New York Red Bulls	2010	MLS	13	1	0	0	–		0	0	0	0	13	1
New York Red Bulls	Total		36	5	1	0	0	0	0	0	0	0	37	5
Colorado Rapids	2010	MLS	7	0	0	0	–		0	0	3	0	10	0
Colorado Rapids	2011	MLS	9	0	0	0	–		5	2	3	0	17	2
Colorado Rapids	Total		16	0	0	0	0	0	5	2	6	0	27	2
Houston Dynamo	2012	MLS	29	4	0	0	1	0	2	0	5	0	37	4
AEL Kalloni	2012–13	Football League Greece	19	6	0	0	–		–		–		19	6
Levadiakos	2013–14	Super League Greece	12	0	0	0	–		–		–		12	0
HJK Helsinki	2014	Veikkausliiga	24	6	3	2	0	0	11	3	–		38	11
Al-Faisaly	2014–15	Saudi Pro League	10	2	0	0	–		–		–		10	2
HJK Helsinki	2015	Veikkausliiga	5	0	0	0	0	0	0	0	–		5	0
Inter Turku	2017	Veikkausliiga	25	5	0	0	0	0	0	0	–		25	5
Honka	2018	Veikkausliiga	26	16	0	0	0	0	0	0	–		26	16
Honka	2019	Veikkausliiga	4	2	0	0	0	0	0	0	–		4	2
Honka	2020	Veikkausliiga	17	4	4	0	0	0	0	0	–		21	4
Lahti	2021	Veikkausliiga	26	5	0	0	0	0	–		–		26	5
Lahti	2022	Veikkausliiga	24	3	6	6	3	0	–		2	0	35	9
Career total			282	68	16	9	4	0	18	5	20	0	363	86

== Honours ==
Atlanta Silverbacks

- USL 1 runner-up: 2007

New York Red Bulls

- Major League Soccer Western Conference Championship: 2008

Colorado Rapids

- Major League Soccer Eastern Conference Championship: 2010
- Major League Soccer MLS Cup: 2010

HJK Helsinki

- Veikkausliiga: 2014
- Finnish Cup: 2014

Individual

- 2007 USL Division 1 Player of the Week (Week 17)
- 2007 USL Division 1 Goal of the Week (Week 17 – view here)
- 2008 USL Division 1 Player of the Week (Weeks 10, 16)
- 2008 USL Division 1 Team of the Week (Weeks 7, 10, 12, 16, 17, 22)
- 2008 USL Division 1 Goal of the Week (Week 16 – view here)
- 2009 MLS Player of the Week (Week 8)
- 2018 Veikkausliiga Player of the Month (June).
- 2018 Veikkausliiga Player of the Month (July).
- Veikkausliiga Team of the Year: 2018
