= Joel Lindpere =

Estonian footballer

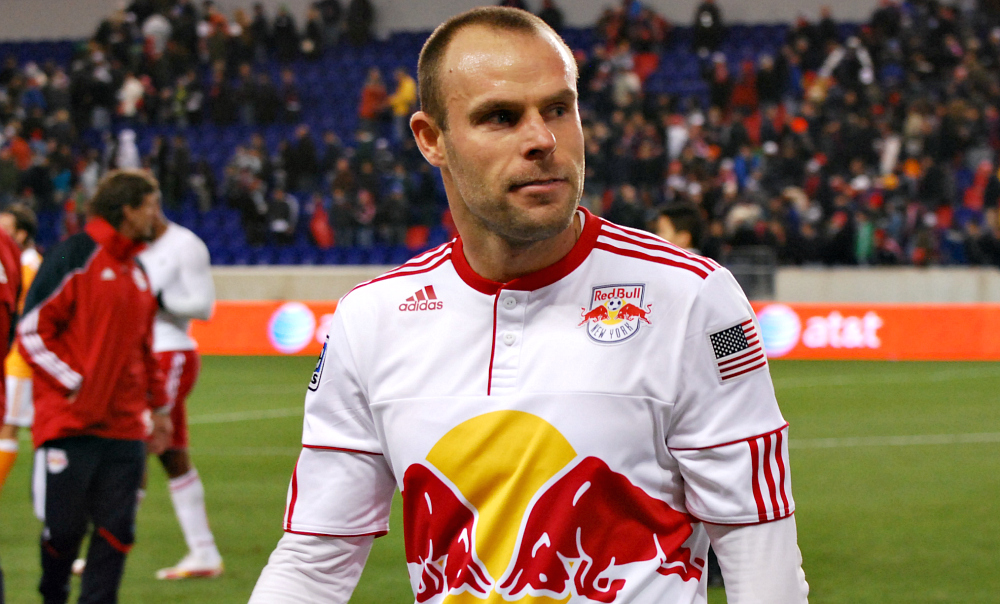
- Lindpere with the New York Red Bulls in 2011

Personal information
- Date of birth: 5 October 1981 (age 45)
- Place of birth: Tallinn, then part of Estonian SSR, Soviet Union
- Height: 5 ft 10 in (1.78 m)
- Position: Midfielder

Senior career*
Years	Team	Apps	(Gls)
1997	Nõmme Kalju	7	(13)
1997–1999	Lelle	23	(5)
2000–2007	Flora	130	(38)
2001–2002	→ Valga (loan)	20	(17)
2005	→ CSKA Sofia (loan)	11	(0)
2007–2009	Tromsø	75	(5)
2010–2012	New York Red Bulls	104	(17)
2013	Chicago Fire	25	(2)
2014–2015	Baník Ostrava	18	(0)
2015	Nõmme Kalju	28	(4)
Total		441	(101)

International career
1999–2016	Estonia	107	(7)

Managerial career
- 2017: Estonia U19 (assistant)
- * Club domestic league appearances and goals

Joel Lindpere (born 5 October 1981) is an Estonian football coach and former professional player.

Lindpere played as a midfielder for Nõmme Kalju, Lelle, Flora, Valga, CSKA Sofia, Tromsø, New York Red Bulls, Chicago Fire, and Baník Ostrava. He also made 107 appearances for the Estonia national team, scoring 7 goals.

== Club career ==
=== Early years ===
Born in Tallinn, Lindpere made his first-team debut for Nõmme Kalju at the age of 15 in 1997. He then moved to Lelle, and scored 5 goals in 23 appearances with the club.

=== Flora ===
In 2000, Lindpere signed for FC Flora. In 2001, he was loaned to Valga, playing 20 games and scoring 17 goals. After his impressive goal scoring display with Valga, he moved back to Flora during the 2002 season. Upon his return to Flora, Lindpere quickly established himself as one of the best midfielders in the Meistriliiga and helped his club to win the Meistriliiga in 2002 and 2003. In February 2005, Lindpere was loaned to Bulgarian A Group club CSKA Sofia for the remainder of the season. In September 2006, Lindpere was released from the club after an incident with a 4th referee in a Cup match against Levadia.

=== Tromsø ===
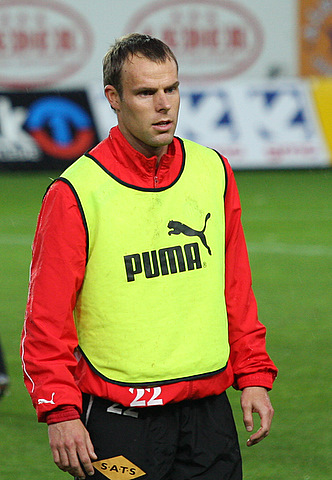
Lindpere with Tromsø

In February 2007, Lindpere signed a three-year contract with Norwegian Eliteserien club Tromsø. His first goal for Tromsø came against Molde FK in a training match only a few days after he had signed his contract. On 20 August 2009 Lindpere scored against top Spanish side Athletic Bilbao in a 3–2 loss in a UEFA Europa League match played at San Mamés Stadium.

=== New York Red Bulls ===
After the 2009 season, Lindpere turned down a contract extension from Tromsø and underwent trials at German Hansa Rostock and Russian clubs Anzhi Makhachkala and Sibir Novosibirsk before eventually signing with Major League Soccer club New York Red Bulls on 25 January 2010. His contract was for two years with options for two additional years. He scored his first goal for the club in a friendly against Santos FC on 20 March 2010, becoming the first player to score a goal at the new Red Bull Arena. He followed this up with the Red Bulls first goal of the 2010 Major League Soccer season, scoring the winning goal of the season opener against the Chicago Fire.

On 22 July 2010, Lindpere played in the Red Bulls friendly against Tottenham Hotspur where he sent a low cross in to the 6 yard box (5 Meters) which New York Red Bulls new signing, Thierry Henry, cleverly clipped past the goalkeeper to score his first goal for the club. On 21 October 2010 Lindpere scored the Red Bulls second goal in a 2–0 victory over New England Revolution which helped New York clinch its second regular season Eastern Conference title. On 30 October 2010 Lindpere scored the only goal in the Red Bull's 1–0 victory in the first leg of their First Round Playoff against the San Jose Earthquakes in the 55th minute at Buck Shaw Stadium in Santa Clara. During the 2010 MLS season Lindpere scored 3 goals and led the club in assists with 6. Lindpere earned two awards for his play in MLS. At mid-season, he was added to the 2010 MLS All-Star roster as an inactive member for the match against Manchester United F.C., and the end of the season Lindpere was named 2010 Most Valuable Player for New York Red Bulls. Joel Lindpere was voted Major League Soccer Player of the Week by the North American Soccer Reporters for Week 16 of the 2011 Major League Soccer season. Lindpere set team season records in games played (34), games started (34), and minutes played (3,048). He missed only 12 minutes of game action. His seven goals and seven assists were ranked third and first on the team. On 26 October 2011 Lindpere helped New York to a 2–0 victory over FC Dallas at Pizza Hut Park in a 2011 MLS Cup Playoffs match by scoring the club's first goal of the night.

Lindpere signed a multi-year contract extension with New York on 31 January 2012.

=== Chicago Fire ===
On 4 January 2013, Lindpere was traded to Chicago Fire in exchange for an international roster spot.

=== Baník Ostrava ===
Lindpere joined Czech club Baník Ostrava in January 2014 on a deal until 30 June 2016. He made his debut in a 4–0 win against Znojmo. Although he was a valuable players for Baník Ostrava, Lindpere left in the winter break of the 2014–15 season.

=== Nõmme Kalju ===
Lindpere returned to Estonia and on 5 March 2015, Estonian transfer window deadline day, signed for his first club, Nõmme Kalju. He ended his career after the 2015 season.

== International career ==
Lindpere made his international debut for Estonia on 1 November 1999, when he was 18 years old, in a friendly match against United Arab Emirates in Abu Dhabi, when he substituted Andres Oper in the 46th minute. Since his debut, Lindpere has been a prominent member of the national team. He scored his first goal for the team in a 1–0 friendly win over Moldova in the 58th minute.

In the beginning of 2010, he announced that he will not play for the national team because he wants to focus on his club career. In 2011, he stated the same. However, after Estonia finished in second place in Group C in UEFA Euro 2012 qualifying in October 2011, Lindpere left the door open to return to the national team for their play-off series against Ireland. He stated that his decision to play would heavily depend on whether his club team qualified for the MLS play-offs and that they were his main priority at the moment. After New York's elimination from the play-offs, Lindpere was given permission to join the Estonia squad for its matches against Ireland.

Lindpere gained his 100th cap on 14 June 2015, in a UEFA Euro 2016 qualifying match against San Marino, setting up Sergei Zenjov's opener in a 2–0 home win. Lindpere finished his international career with a testimonial match on 1 June 2016 against Andorra, having made 107 appearances and scoring 7 goals.

== Career statistics ==
=== Club ===
Club	Season	League			Cup		Continental		Other		Total	
Club	Season	Division	Apps	Goals	Apps	Goals	Apps	Goals	Apps	Goals	Apps	Goals
Nõmme Kalju	1997–98	III liiga	7	13			—				7	13
Lelle	1998	Meistriliiga	1	0			—				1	0
Lelle	1999	Meistriliiga	22	5			—				22	5
Lelle	Total		23	5			0	0			23	5
Flora	2000	Meistriliiga	27	8			1	0	0	0	28	8
Flora	2001	Meistriliiga	7	0			2	0	0	0	9	0
Flora	2002	Meistriliiga	20	10			2	0	1	1	23	11
Flora	2003	Meistriliiga	20	5			2	0	6	0	28	5
Flora	2004	Meistriliiga	25	6			2	0	2	0	29	6
Flora	2005	Meistriliiga	11	3			0	0	0	0	11	3
Flora	2006	Meistriliiga	20	5			4	1	0	0	24	6
Flora	Total		130	38			13	1	9	1	152	40
Valga (loan)	2001	Esiliiga	12	6			—		0	0	12	6
Valga (loan)	2002	Esiliiga	8	11			—		0	0	8	11
Valga (loan)	Total		20	17			0	0	0	0	20	17
CSKA Sofia (loan)	2004–05	A Group	11	0			0	0	0	0	11	0
Tromsø	2007	Eliteserien	24	3			—		0	0	24	3
Tromsø	2008	Eliteserien	24	0			—		0	0	24	0
Tromsø	2009	Eliteserien	27	2			6	1	0	0	33	3
Tromsø	Total		75	5			6	1	0	0	81	6
New York Red Bulls	2010	Major League Soccer	31	4	0	0	—		0	0	31	4
New York Red Bulls	2011	Major League Soccer	37	8	0	0	—		0	0	37	8
New York Red Bulls	2012	Major League Soccer	36	5	0	0	—		0	0	36	5
New York Red Bulls	Total		104	17	0	0	0	0	0	0	104	17
Chicago Fire	2013	Major League Soccer	25	2	3	1	—		0	0	28	3
Baník Ostrava	2013–14	Czech First League	3	0	0	0	—		0	0	3	0
Baník Ostrava	2014–15	Czech First League	15	0	0	0	—		0	0	15	0
Baník Ostrava	Total		18	0	0	0	0	0	0	0	18	0
Nõmme Kalju	2015	Meistriliiga	28	4	3	3	4	0	0	0	35	7
Career total			441	101	6	4	23	2	9	1	479	108

=== International ===
National team	Year	Apps	Goals
Estonia
Estonia	1999	2	0
Estonia	2002	6	0
Estonia	2003	12	0
Estonia	2004	14	3
Estonia	2005	7	1
Estonia	2006	4	0
Estonia	2007	12	1
Estonia	2008	8	0
Estonia	2009	9	0
Estonia	2011	1	0
Estonia	2012	8	0
Estonia	2013	8	2
Estonia	2014	6	0
Estonia	2015	8	0
Estonia	2016	1	0
Total		107	7

=== International goals ===
Estonia score listed first, score column indicates score after each Lindpere goal.

No.	Date	Venue	Cap	Opponent	Score	Result	Competition
1	18 February 2004	Ta' Qali National Stadium, La Valletta, Malta	23	Moldova	1–0	1–0	2004 Malta Tournament
2	30 May 2004	A. Le Coq Arena, Tallinn, Estonia	27	Denmark	2–2	2–2	Friendly
3	18 August 2004	Rheinpark Stadion, Vaduz, Liechtenstein	30	Liechtenstein	2–1	2–1	2006 FIFA World Cup qualification
4	12 November 2005	Finnair Stadium, Helsinki, Finland	40	Finland	2–2	2–2	Friendly
5	17 November 2007	Estadi Comunal, Andorra la Vella, Andorra	56	Andorra	2–0	2–0	UEFA Euro 2008 qualifying
6	26 March 2013	A. Le Coq Arena, Tallinn, Estonia	86	Andorra	2–0	2–0	2014 FIFA World Cup qualification
7	15 November 2013	A. Le Coq Arena, Tallinn, Estonia	91	Azerbaijan	2–1	2–1	Friendly

== Honours ==
=== Club ===
Flora

- Meistriliiga: 2002, 2003
- Estonian Supercup: 2002, 2003

CSKA Sofia

- A Group: 2004–05

New York Red Bulls

- Emirates Cup: 2011
- Atlantic Cup: 2010, 2011
- Walt Disney World Pro Soccer Classic: 2010

Chicago Fire

- Carolina Challenge Cup: 2013

Nõmme Kalju

- Estonian Cup: 2014–15

=== Individual ===
- Major League Soccer All Star: 2010, 2011
- Most Valuable Player for New York Red Bulls: 2010

== See also ==
- List of men's footballers with 100 or more international caps
