= Roy Miller (footballer) =

Costa Rican footballer (born 1984)

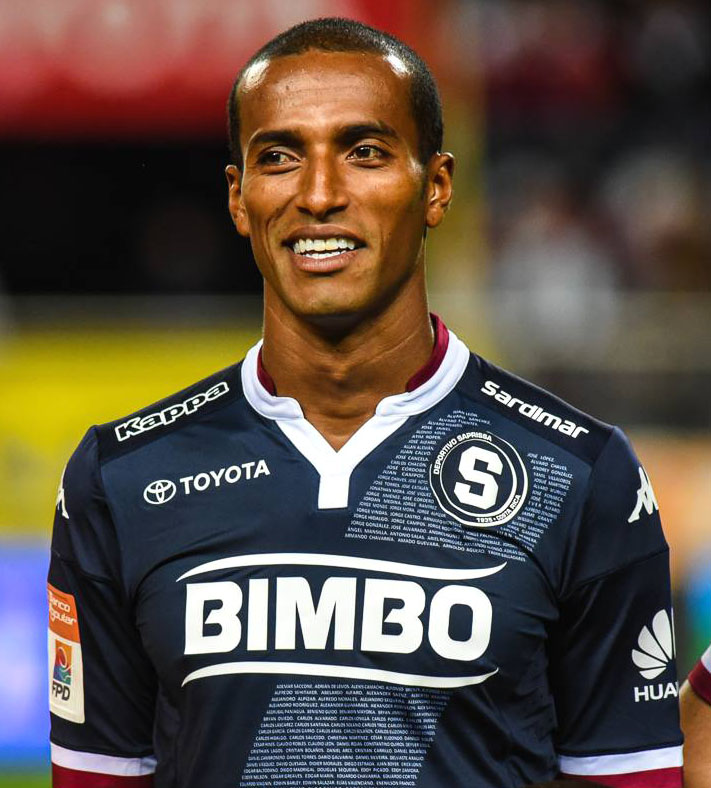
- Miller with Saprissa in 2016

Personal information
- Full name: Roy Miller Hernández
- Date of birth: 24 November 1984 (age 41)
- Place of birth: Limón, Costa Rica
- Height: 6 ft 2 in (1.88 m)
- Position: Defender

Youth career
- 2001–2003: Cartaginés

Senior career*
Years	Team	Apps	(Gls)
2003–2005	Cartaginés	34	(0)
2005–2007	Bodø/Glimt	52	(6)
2008–2009	Rosenborg	17	(0)
2009	→ Örgryte (loan)	14	(0)
2010–2015	New York Red Bulls	125	(0)
2015	→ New York Red Bulls II (loan)	1	(0)
2016–2017	Saprissa	54	(4)
2017–2018	Portland Timbers	26	(1)
2018	→ Portland Timbers 2 (loan)	7	(0)
2019	Portland Timbers 2	13	(1)
2019–2020	Saprissa	14	(0)
2020–2021	Santos de Guápiles	19	(1)
2021–2023	Sporting San José	20	(5)

International career^{‡}
2001	Costa Rica U17	4	(0)
2005–2015	Costa Rica	57	(2)
- * Club domestic league appearances and goals as of 29 May 2021 ‡ National team caps and goals as of 20 July 2015

Roy Miller Hernández (born 24 November 1984) is a Costa Rican former professional footballer who played as a defender.

== Career ==
=== Club ===
Miller began his career in the youth ranks of Cartaginés. In 2002, he went on trial with Argentine side Olimpo de Bahía Blanca, but was unable to acclimate himself to the club and returned to Costa Rica.

Miller turned professional with Cartaginés before moving to the north of Norway at Bodø/Glimt along with his compatriot and teammate at Cartaginés, Randall Brenes. He had a successful stay at Bodø/Glimt, appearing in 52 league matches and scoring 6 goals, leading to interest from top Norwegian side Rosenborg.

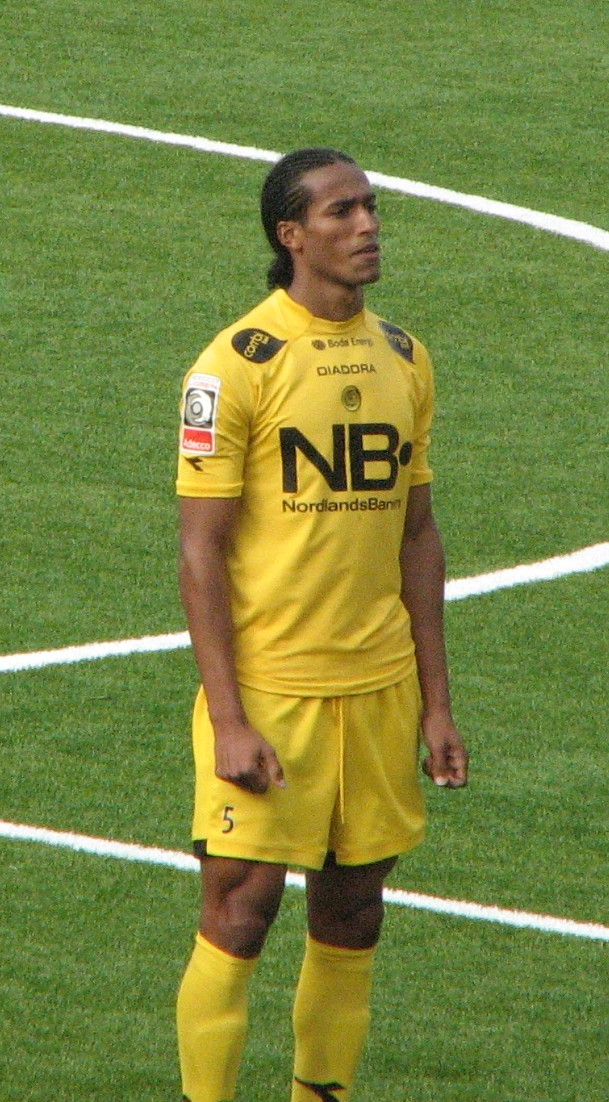
Miller playing for Bodø/Glimt

In February 2008 Miller signed a 3-year long contract with Rosenborg, and quickly established himself as the team's starting left back. A knee injury curtailed his progress with Rosenborg, and upon returning to action, he was loaned out to Örgryte on 28 July 2009. With Örgryte Miller played in the final 14 games of the 2009 Allsvenskan season. Miller was very appreciated by the Örgryte fans.

In January 2010, Miller signed a 2-year long contract with New York Red Bulls of Major League Soccer. On 20 March 2010, Miller started for Red Bulls in a 3–1 victory against Santos FC, which was the first match played at the new Red Bull Arena. Miller made his Major League Soccer debut on 27 March 2010, playing the full 90 in New York's opening game of the 2010 MLS season against Chicago Fire that ended in a 1–0 victory for New York. On 21 October 2010 Miller started for Red Bulls in a 2–0 victory over New England Revolution which clinched the regular season Eastern Conference title.

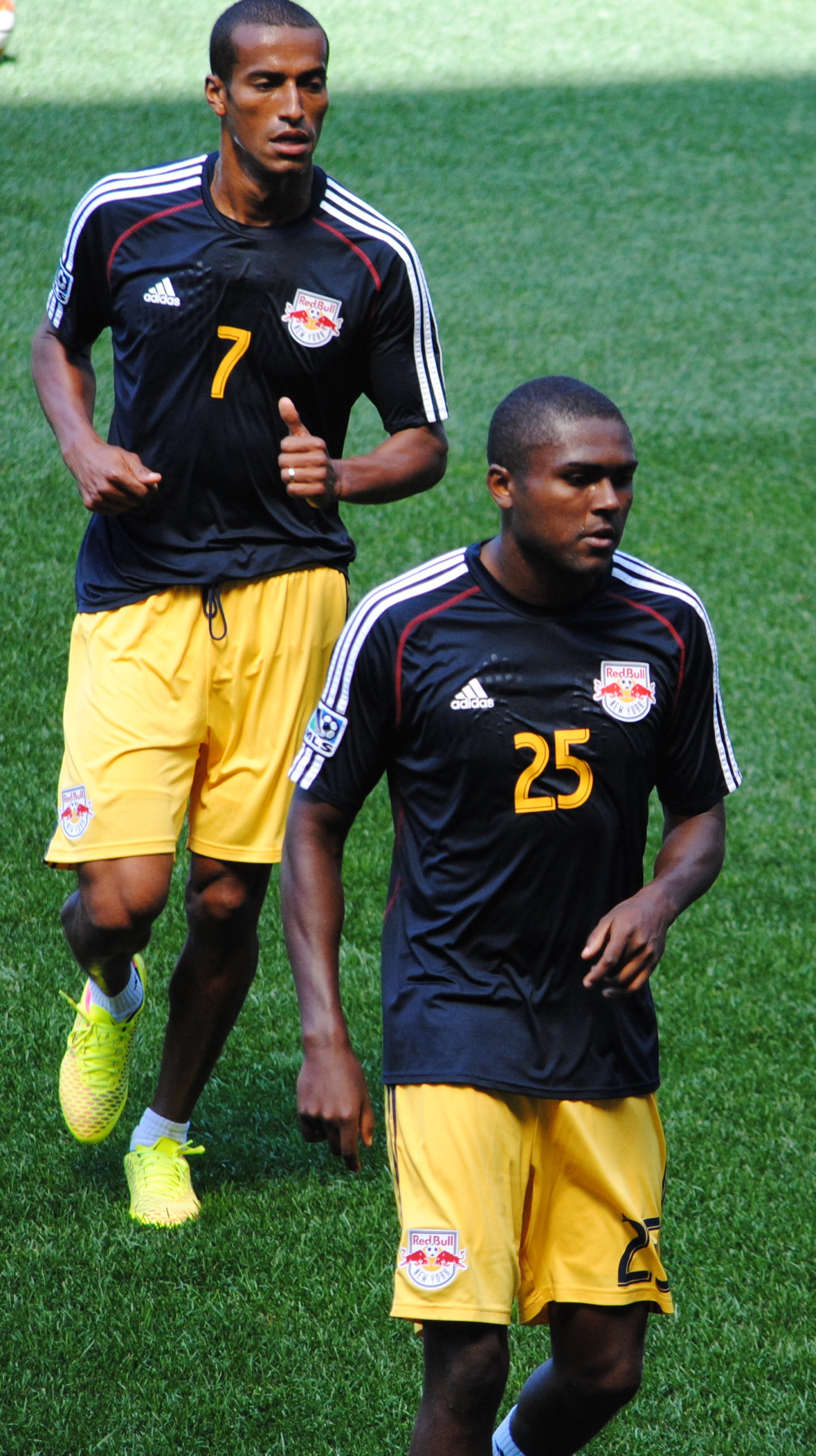
Miller with teammate Chris Duvall

In December 2013 it was reported that Miller would be returning to Costa Rica to sign with top club Saprissa, however, Miller rejected the clubs offer and decided to renew his contract with New York. Miller was limited to 17 league games during the 2013 season due to injuries and national team duty, however he was a part of the team that captured the club's first official title the MLS Supporters' Shield. In 2015, Miller was slowly phased out of the starting eleven due to the emergence of Jamaican leftback, Kemar Lawrence and missed a large portion of the season due to injuries as well. Miller won his second trophy with the club when they claimed the Supporter's Shield for the second time in three years. On 30 November 2015, the day after the Red Bulls were eliminated from the playoffs, it was reported that the club would not pick up Miller's option, ending his six-year tenure with the club.

On 28 December 2015, Miller signed with Costa Rican club Saprissa. In his first season at the club Miller appeared in 22 league matches and scored one goal. In his second season with the club he appeared in 26 matches scoring three goals, and helped Saprissa to the 2016 Torneo Invierno title.

On 10 December 2018, Miller was released by Portland Timbers after two seasons with the club.

=== International ===
Miller was an unmovable player at youth levels with the Ticos. He played in the 2001 FIFA U-17 World Championship held in Trinidad and Tobago and the qualification rounds for the 2006 FIFA World Cup, he was left out of the squad just a few weeks before the inaugural game's kick off.

Miller made his full debut for the Ticos in 2005 as a substitute against Ecuador, and has since then collected 52 more caps including two in the 2010 World Cup qualification playoffs against Uruguay and one in the 2014 FIFA World Cup.

==== International goals ====
Scores and results list. Costa Rica's goal tally first.

Goal	Date	Venue	Opponent	Score	Result	Competition
1	8 June 2013	Estadio Nacional de Costa Rica, San José, Costa Rica	Honduras	1–0	1–0	2014 FIFA World Cup qualification
2	8 July 2015	StubHub Center, Carson, California	Jamaica	1-1	2-2	2015 CONCACAF Gold Cup

== Honors ==
Rosenborg BK

- Tippeligaen: 2009

New York Red Bulls

- MLS Supporters' Shield: 2013, 2015

Costa Rica

- Copa Centroamericana: 2005, 2014

== Statistics ==
Club	Season	Primera División		UNCAF Copa Interclubes		CONCACAF Champions' Cup		Total
Club	Season	App	Goals	App	Goals	App	Goals	App	Goals
Cartaginés	2003–04	18	0	0	0	0	0	18	0
Cartaginés	2004–05	16	0	0	0	0	0	16	0
Cartaginés	Club Total	34	0	0	0	0	0	34	0
Club	Season	Tippeligaen		Norwegian Cup		UEFA Europa League		Total
Club	Season	App	Goals	App	Goals	App	Goals	App	Goals
Bodø/Glimt	2005	17	1	2	0	0	0	19	1
Bodø/Glimt	2006	17	3	3	1	0	0	20	4
Bodø/Glimt	2007	18	2	2	0	0	0	20	2
Bodø/Glimt	Club Total	52	6	7	1	0	0	59	7
Rosenborg	2008	14	0	2	0	4	0	20	0
Rosenborg	2009	3	0	3	1	3	0	9	1
Rosenborg	Club Total	17	0	5	1	7	0	29	1
Club	Season	Allsvenskan		Svenska Cupen		UEFA Europa League		Total
Club	Season	App	Goals	App	Goals	App	Goals	App	Goals
Örgryte (loan)	2009	14	0	-	-	-	-	14	0
Örgryte (loan)	Club Total	14	0	-	-	-	-	14	0
Club	Season	MLS		U.S. Open Cup/MLS Cup		CONCACAF Champions League		Total
Club	Season	App	Goals	App	Goals	App	Goals	App	Goals
New York Red Bulls	2010	25	0	4	0	0	0	29	0
New York Red Bulls	2011	30	0	3	0	0	0	33	0
New York Red Bulls	2012	24	0	2	0	-	-	26	0
New York Red Bulls	2013	17	0	1	0	-	-	18	0
New York Red Bulls	2014	23	0	3	0	1	0	27	0
New York Red Bulls	2015	6	0	1	0	-	-	7	0
New York Red Bulls	Club Total	125	0	14	0	1	0	140	0
New York Red Bulls II (loan)	2015	1	0	-	-	-	-	1	0
Club	Season	Primera División		UNCAF Copa Interclubes		CONCACAF Champions' Cup		Total
Club	Season	App	Goals	App	Goals	App	Goals	App	Goals
Saprissa	2015–16	22	1	-	-	-	-	22	1
Saprissa	2016–17	26	3	-	-	4	0	30	3
Saprissa	Club Total	48	4	0	0	4	0	52	4
Career totals		291	10	26	2	12	0	329	12
