= Hasse Backe =

Swedish football player and manager

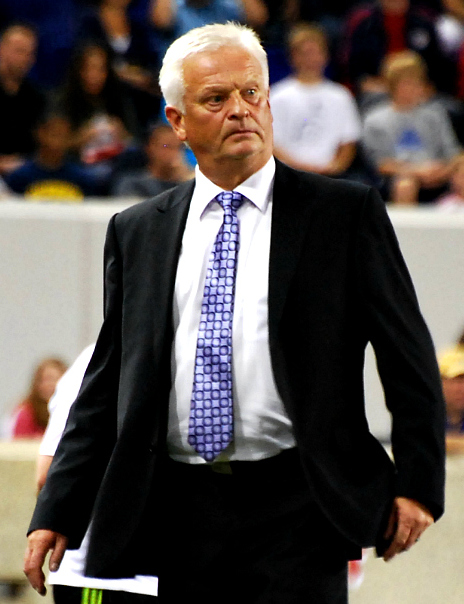
- Backe in 2011

Personal information
- Full name: Hans Roland Backe
- Date of birth: 14 February 1952 (age 74)
- Place of birth: Luleå, Sweden
- Positions: Defender; midfielder

Senior career*
Years	Team	Apps	(Gls)
1970–1972	AIK	0	(0)
1973–1976	Spånga	88	(21)
1977–1978	Brommapojkarna	32	(7)
1979–1981	Bro		

Managerial career
- 1982–1984: Djurgården
- 1985: Molde
- 1986: Tyresö
- 1987–1988: Hammarby
- 1989–1993: Öster
- 1994–1995: AIK
- 1996–1997: Stabæk
- 1998–2000: Aalborg
- 2000–2001: SV Salzburg
- 2001–2005: Copenhagen
- 2006: Panathinaikos
- 2009: Notts County
- 2010–2012: New York Red Bulls
- 2016: Finland
- * Club domestic league appearances and goals

Hans Roland "Hasse" Backe (Swedish pronunciation: [ˈhɑːns ˈhâsːɛ ˈbâkːɛ]; born 14 February 1952) is a Swedish football manager and former player who most recently led Finland's national team. Prior to this he managed the New York Red Bulls.

He has coached clubs in Sweden, Norway, Greece, England and the United States, and achieved his greatest successes in Denmark at Copenhagen and Aalborg.

== Playing career ==
Backe's playing career lasted through the 1970s, mostly in the Swedish lower divisions, including one stint with Brommapojkarna in 1977–1978. He took up coaching while playing for Bro, and led them from the fifth to the third tier.

== Managerial career ==
=== Early career in Scandinavia ===
Backe began his managerial career with Djurgården in his native Sweden from 1982 to 1984, compiling a record of 38 wins, 20 draws and only 12 losses, which included a first-place finish in the 1982 Division 2 Norra. Following his early success with Djurgården he went on to manage Molde, Hammarby IF, Öster, AIK and numerous other top Scandinavian clubs. In 1989, he led Öster to a first-place finish in Division 1 Södra in which the club ended the season unbeaten in all 26 league matches and gained promotion to the Swedish Allsvenskan.

=== Denmark ===
He enjoyed his greatest success in Denmark, having won three Danish titles with Copenhagen and Aalborg. In his first season in Danish football Backe led Aalborg to the 1998–99 Danish Superliga title. He also helped guide the club to consecutive Danish Cup finals in his two years at the club. During the 2001 season Backe returned to Denmark to lead top side Copenhagen. During his time at the club, the Danish side would enjoy one of the club's most successful spells. During this period, Backe led Copenhagen to two Danish Superliga titles, one Danish Cup title and two Danish Super Cup titles, which included a treble winning season during the 2003–04 season. He subsequently led the club to the inaugural Royal League title in 2004–05, defeating IFK Göteborg on penalties in the final.

=== Panathinaikos ===
Backe was the manager of Panathinaikos in Athens until 14 September 2006, when he was fired after just three games due to the team's poor performance in this time. Although Panathinaikos won two of three league matches, a 2–0 home loss to Ionikos and a 1–1 draw at home in a UEFA Cup tie against Ukrainian side Metalurh Zaporizhzhia led to his dismissal.

=== Assistant to Sven-Göran Eriksson ===
In July 2007, he was appointed as assistant manager at Manchester City in the Premier League, working alongside fellow countryman Sven-Göran Eriksson. Prior to being appointed as Manchester City assistant manager, he worked as a senior advisor for Östers, as well as a football analyst and commentator for Swedish TV4. Backe briefly resigned his position at Manchester City after a family crisis in Sweden forced him to take compassionate leave shortly into his time at the club, but after a month was able to return at his former post. Along with Eriksson, Backe and first-team coach Tord Grip parted company with Manchester City, joining Mexico with the two Swedes.

=== Notts County ===
On 27 October 2009, Backe was appointed as manager of Notts County; the Swedish coach signed a three-year contract with the club. He resigned just seven weeks later, on 15 December after a dispute about wages not being paid was announced. During his time with Notts County, Backe compiled four wins (including two FA Cup wins), three draws and two losses.

=== New York Red Bulls ===
On 7 January 2010, Backe was named manager of New York Red Bulls. After a blistering start to the 2010 season, club fans began to create shirts and flags with his likeness, and these honors culminated in the birth of the Hans Backe Viking Army, an offshoot of the Empire Supporters Club and Garden State Supporters. In his first season with New York, he coached the team to an Eastern Conference first-place finish. Then, on 9 November 2012, it was announced that Backe would not extend his contract with the Red Bulls.

=== Finland ===
On 12 August 2015, Backe was named manager of Finland national football team, starting on 1 January 2016. His first official match with the team was held on 10 January 2016 and ended in a 0-3 defeat by Sweden. Backe was fired as head coach of Finland's national football team 12 December 2016. Finland did not win one single game during Backe's time as head coach; 11 matches resulted in 9 defeats and 2 draws.

== Managerial statistics ==
As of match played 11 June 2017

Team	From	To	Record				
Team	From	To	P	W	D	L	Win %
Djurgården	January 1982	December 1984	70	38	20	12	54.29
Molde	April 1985	October 1986	22	7	7	8	31.82
Hammarby	January 1987	December 1988	44	11	13	20	25.00
Öster	January 1989	December 1993	134	60	44	30	44.78
AIK	January 1994	June 1995	52	18	17	17	34.62
Stabæk	April 1996	October 1997	52	22	13	17	42.31
Aalborg	1 January 1998	30 June 2000	66	29	26	11	43.94
SV Salzburg	1 July 2000	10 September 2001	45	16	13	16	35.56
Copenhagen	17 September 2001	31 December 2005	199	110	56	33	55.28
Panathinaikos	1 July 2006	14 September 2006	3	2	0	1	66.67
Notts County	27 October 2009	15 December 2009	7	2	3	2	28.57
New York Red Bulls	7 January 2010	9 November 2012	98	41	31	26	41.84
Finland	1 January 2016	12 December 2016	13	0	3	10	0.00
Total			806	356	247	203	44.17

== Honours ==
=== Manager ===
Djurgården

- Division 2 Norra: 1982

Öster

- Division 1 Södra: 1989

Aalborg

- Danish Superliga: 1998–99

Copenhagen

- Danish Superliga: 2002–03, 2003–04
- Danish Cup: 2004
- Danish Super Cup: 2001, 2004
- Royal League: 2004–05

New York Red Bulls

- Eastern Conference Regular Season: 2010
