= 2009 New York Red Bulls season =

New York Red Bulls
2009 season
- Owner: Red Bull GmbH
- Coach: Richie Williams Interim
- Average home league attendance: 12,744
| Home colors | Away colors |

The 2009 New York Red Bulls season was the fourteenth season of the team's existence. It began with a 3–0 loss at expansion Seattle Sounders FC on March 19, and ended on October 24 with a 5–0 win over Toronto FC, the last match ever played by the team in Giants Stadium.

This was the last season in which the Red Bulls missed the playoffs until 2025.

== Squad ==
=== First-team squad ===
Note: Flags indicate national team as defined under FIFA eligibility rules; some limited exceptions apply. Players may hold more than one non-FIFA nationality.

| No. | Pos. | Nation | Player |
|---|---|---|---|
| 1 | GK | USA | Danny Cepero |
| 2 | DF | USA | Kevin Goldthwaite |
| 3 | DF | CRC | Carlos Johnson |
| 4 | DF | USA | Carlos Mendes |
| 5 | MF | ESP | Albert Celades |
| 6 | MF | USA | Seth Stammler (vice-captain) |
| 8 | MF | BIH | Siniša Ubiparipović |
| 9 | FW | COL | Juan Pablo Ángel (captain) |
| 10 | FW | SEN | Macoumba Kandji |
| 11 | MF | RSA | Danleigh Borman |
| 12 | DF | USA | Mike Petke |
| 13 | MF | VEN | Jorge Rojas |

| No. | Pos. | Nation | Player |
|---|---|---|---|
| 14 | MF | CMR | Matthew Mbuta |
| 15 | FW | USA | John Wolyniec |
| 17 | MF | USA | Jeremy Hall |
| 18 | DF | USA | Leonard Krupnik |
| 19 | MF | JAM | Dane Richards |
| 20 | DF | ARG | Walter García |
| 21 | MF | AUT | Ernst Öbster |
| 22 | MF | USA | Nick Zimmerman |
| 24 | GK | SEN | Bouna Coundoul |
| 27 | DF | NZL | Andrew Boyens |
| 32 | MF | USA | Luke Sassano |

== Club ==
=== Management ===
| Position | Staff |
|---|---|
| Sporting Director | (United States) Jeff Agoos |
| Head Coach | (United States) Richie Williams interim |
| Assistant Coach | (Republic of Ireland) Des McAleenan |
| Goalkeeper Coach | (Republic of Ireland) Des McAleenan |
| Head Athletic trainer | (United States) Rick Guter |
| Assistant Athletic trainer | (United States) Michelle Lafiosca |
| Equipment manager | (Colombia) Fernando Ruiz |

Last updated: April 18, 2009
Source: New York Red Bulls

=== Other information ===
| Owner | (Austria) Red Bull GmbH |
| Ground (capacity and dimensions) | Giants Stadium (80,242 / N/A) |

Source: New York Red Bulls

== Competitions ==
=== Overall ===
| Competition | Started round | Final position / round | First match | Last match |
|---|---|---|---|---|
| MLS | — | 15 | March 19, 2009 | October 24, 2009 |
| CONCACAF Champions League 2009–10 | Preliminary round | Preliminary round | July 28, 2009 | August 5, 2009 |

Updated to match played April 15, 2008
Source: Competitions

=== Major League Soccer ===
==== Standings ====
| Pos | Team | Pld | W | L | T | GF | GA | GD | Pts | Qualification |
|---|---|---|---|---|---|---|---|---|---|---|
| 1 | Columbus Crew | 30 | 13 | 7 | 10 | 41 | 31 | +10 | 49 | MLS Cup Playoffs |
| 2 | Chicago Fire | 30 | 11 | 7 | 12 | 39 | 34 | +5 | 45 | MLS Cup Playoffs |
| 3 | New England Revolution | 30 | 11 | 10 | 9 | 33 | 37 | −4 | 42 | MLS Cup Playoffs |
| 4 | D.C. United | 30 | 9 | 8 | 13 | 43 | 44 | −1 | 40 | |
| 5 | Toronto FC | 30 | 10 | 11 | 9 | 37 | 46 | −9 | 39 | |
| 6 | Kansas City Wizards | 30 | 8 | 13 | 9 | 33 | 42 | −9 | 33 | |
| 7 | New York Red Bulls | 30 | 5 | 19 | 6 | 27 | 47 | −20 | 21 | |

Source: MLS

| Pos | Team | Pld | W | L | T | GF | GA | GD | Pts | Qualification |
|---|---|---|---|---|---|---|---|---|---|---|
| 1 | Columbus Crew (S) | 30 | 13 | 7 | 10 | 41 | 31 | +10 | 49 | CONCACAF Champions League |
| 2 | LA Galaxy | 30 | 12 | 6 | 12 | 36 | 31 | +5 | 48 | CONCACAF Champions League |
| 3 | Houston Dynamo | 30 | 13 | 8 | 9 | 39 | 29 | +10 | 48 | North American SuperLiga |
| 4 | Seattle Sounders FC | 30 | 12 | 7 | 11 | 38 | 29 | +9 | 47 | CONCACAF Champions League |
| 5 | Chicago Fire | 30 | 11 | 7 | 12 | 39 | 34 | +5 | 45 | North American SuperLiga |
| 6 | Chivas USA | 30 | 13 | 11 | 6 | 34 | 31 | +3 | 45 | North American SuperLiga |
| 7 | New England Revolution | 30 | 11 | 10 | 9 | 33 | 37 | −4 | 42 | North American SuperLiga |
| 8 | Real Salt Lake (C) | 30 | 11 | 12 | 7 | 43 | 35 | +8 | 40 | CONCACAF Champions League |
| 9 | Colorado Rapids | 30 | 10 | 10 | 10 | 42 | 38 | +4 | 40 | |
| 10 | D.C. United | 30 | 9 | 8 | 13 | 43 | 44 | −1 | 40 | |
| 11 | FC Dallas | 30 | 11 | 13 | 6 | 50 | 47 | +3 | 39 | |
| 12 | Toronto FC | 30 | 10 | 11 | 9 | 37 | 46 | −9 | 39 | CONCACAF Champions League |
| 13 | Kansas City Wizards | 30 | 8 | 13 | 9 | 33 | 42 | −9 | 33 | |
| 14 | San Jose Earthquakes | 30 | 7 | 14 | 9 | 36 | 50 | −14 | 30 | |
| 15 | New York Red Bulls | 30 | 5 | 19 | 6 | 27 | 47 | −20 | 21 | |

Source: MLS
Rules for classification: 1) points; 2) head-to-head record; 3) goal difference; 4) number of goals scored
(C) Champions; (S) Supporters' Shield

==== Results summary ====
| Overall | | | | | | | | Home | | | | | | Away | | | | | |
| Pld | Pts | W | L | T | GF | GA | GD | W | L | T | GF | GA | GD | W | L | T | GF | GA | GD |
|---|---|---|---|---|---|---|---|---|---|---|---|---|---|---|---|---|---|---|---|
| 30 | 21 | 5 | 19 | 6 | 27 | 47 | −20 | 5 | 6 | 4 | 24 | 20 | +4 | 0 | 13 | 2 | 3 | 27 | −24 |

Last updated: October 25, 2009
Source: Major League Soccer
Pld = Matches played; Pts = Points; W = Matches won; T = Matches tied; L = Matches lost; GF = Goals for; GA = Goals against; GD = Goal difference

| Round | 1 | 2 | 3 | 4 | 5 | 6 | 7 | 8 | 9 | 10 | 11 | 12 | 13 | 14 | 15 | 16 | 17 | 18 | 19 | 20 | 21 | 22 | 23 | 24 | 25 | 26 | 27 | 28 | 29 | 30 |
|---|---|---|---|---|---|---|---|---|---|---|---|---|---|---|---|---|---|---|---|---|---|---|---|---|---|---|---|---|---|---|
| Stadium | A | H | A | A | H | A | H | A | H | H | H | H | A | A | A | H | A | A | A | H | A | H | H | H | H | H | A | A | A | H |
| Result | L | T | L | T | W | L | L | L | W | T | L | L | L | L | L | T | L | L | L | L | L | L | W | W | L | T | T | L | L | W |

Updated to match(es) played on October 25, 2009. Source: New York Red Bulls
A = Away; H = Home; W = Win; L = Loss; T = Tie

== Matches ==
Win Tie Loss

=== MLS ===
| March 19, 2009 | Seattle Sounders FC | 3–0 | New York Red Bulls | Seattle, Washington |
| | Montero 12'; Alonso (yellow card) 13'; Evans 25'; Hurtado (yellow card) 32'; Nyassi (yellow card) 67'; Montero 75' | Report | Goldthwaite (yellow card) 21' | Stadium: Qwest Field; Attendance: 32,523; Referee: Jair Marrufo |

| March 28, 2009 | New York Red Bulls | 1–1 | New England Revolution | East Rutherford, New Jersey, United States |
| | Heaps 35' (o.g.); Sassano (yellow card) 39'; Mendes (yellow card) 46+'; Borman (yellow card) 48' | Report | Thompson (yellow card) 48'; Dube (yellow card) 82'; Mansally 90' | Stadium: Giants Stadium; Attendance: 12,462; Referee: Alex Prus |

| April 5, 2009 | Chicago Fire | 1–0 | New York Red Bulls | Bridgeview, Illinois |
| | Thorrington (red card) 14'; Pappa 33' | Report | Goldthwaite (yellow card) 44'; Richards (yellow card) 91+' | Stadium: Toyota Park; Attendance: 11,633; Referee: Tim Weyland |

| April 11, 2009 | Houston Dynamo | 0–0 | New York Red Bulls | Houston, Texas, United States |
| | Ching (yellow card) 43'; Boswell (yellow card) 79'; Chabala (red card) 93+' | Report | Pietravallo (yellow card) 13'; Boyens (yellow card) 34'; Stammler (yellow card) 54'; Petke (yellow card) 68'; Johnson (red card) 78' | Stadium: Robertson Stadium; Attendance: 19,494; Referee: Hilario Grajeda |

| April 18, 2009 | New York Red Bulls | 2–0 | Real Salt Lake | East Rutherford, New Jersey |
| | Kandji 2'; Angel 57'; Hall (red card) 66'; Richards (yellow card) 69' | Report | Morales (yellow card) 42'; Russell (yellow card) 49' | Stadium: Giants Stadium; Attendance: 8,508; Referee: Ricardo Salazar |

| April 23, 2009 | Kansas City Wizards | 1–0 | New York Red Bulls | Kansas City, Kansas |
| | López 3' (pen.); Conrad (yellow card) 29'; Besler (yellow card) 64' | Report | Johnson (red card) 2' | Stadium: CommunityAmerica Ballpark; Attendance: 10,385; Referee: Michael Kennedy |

| April 26, 2009 | New York Red Bulls | 2–3 | D.C. United | East Rutherford, New Jersey |
| | Angle 68'; Richards 74'; Richards (yellow card) 78' | Report | Wallace 21'; Simms (yellow card) 34'; Jacobson (yellow card) 53'; Wallace (yellow card) 68'; Emilio 90'; Pontius 91+' | Stadium: Giants Stadium; Attendance: 10,303; Referee: Steven DePiero |

| May 2, 2009 | Los Angeles Galaxy | 1–0 | New York Red Bulls | Carson, California |
| | Donovan 4' (pen.) | Report | Johnson (yellow card) 76' | Stadium: The Home Depot Center; Attendance: Abiodun Okulaja; Referee: 21,006 |

| May 8, 2009 | New York Red Bulls | 4–1 | San Jose Earthquakes | East Rutherford, New Jersey |
| | Rojas 7' 13'; Angel 22'; Kandji 40' | Report | Weaver (yellow card) 37'; Johnson 45'; Pitchkolan (yellow card) 59'; Denton (yellow card) 63'; Amarikwa (yellow card) 88' | Stadium: Giants Stadium; Attendance: 8,042; Referee: Jeff Gontarek |

| May 16, 2009 | New York Red Bulls | 1–1 | Houston Dynamo | East Rutherford, New Jersey |
| | Rojas (red card) 35'; Angel (yellow card) 36'; Wolyniec 88'; Petke (yellow card) 90' | Report | Akinbiyi (yellow card) 27'; Wondolowski 78' | Stadium: Giants Stadium; Attendance: 14,647; Referee: Baldomero Toledo |

| May 24, 2009 | New York Red Bulls | 0–1 | Chicago Fire | East Rutherford, New Jersey |
| | Pacheco (yellow card) 44' | Report | Rolfe (yellow card) 17'; Rolfe 45' | Stadium: Giants Stadium; Attendance: 10,762; Referee: Kevin Stott |

| May 30, 2009 | New York Red Bulls | 2–3 | Colorado Rapids | East Rutherford, New Jersey |
| | Angel 45' (pen.); Goldthwaite (yellow card) 59'; Borman 73'; Borman (yellow card) 80'; Angel (yellow card) 82' | Report | Casey 25'; Casey 48'; Ballouchy 60'; Palguta (yellow card) 71'; Pickens (yellow card) 77' | Stadium: Giants Stadium; Attendance: 12,039; Referee: Ricardo Salazar |

| June 4, 2009 | D.C. United | 2–0 | New York Red Bulls | Washington, D.C. |
| | Simms (yellow card) 27'; Quaranta 36'; Emilio (yellow card) 60'; Emilio (red card) 64'; Moreno 93+' (pen.) | Report | Wolyniec (yellow card) 94+' | Stadium: Robert F. Kennedy Memorial Stadium; Attendance: 11,226; Referee: Terry Vaughn |

| June 7, 2009 | New England Revolution | 4–0 | New York Red Bulls | Foxborough, Massachusetts |
| | Joseph (yellow card) 33'; Heaps 47+'; Ralston 52'; Twellman 57' 64' | Report | Goldthwaite (yellow card) 45' | Stadium: Gillette Stadium; Attendance: 11,183; Referee: Abiodun Okulaja |

| June 13, 2009 | Toronto FC | 2–1 | New York Red Bulls | Toronto, Ontario Canada |
| | Cronin 3'; Robinson (yellow card) 31'; Dichio 43'; Serioux (yellow card) 44'; Harmse (yellow card) 88' | Report | Celades 54'; Petke (yellow card) 96+' | Stadium: BMO Field; Attendance: 19,843; Referee: Jair Marrufo |

| June 20, 2009 | New York Red Bulls | 1–1 | Seattle Sounders FC | East Rutherford, New Jersey |
| 19:30 EST | Kandji (yellow card) 11'; Goldthwaite (yellow card) 36'; Angel 40' | Report | Montero 48+'; Marshall (yellow card) 83' | Stadium: Giants Stadium; Attendance: 14,313; Referee: Paul Ward |

| June 24, 2009 | Toronto FC | 2–0 | New York Red Bulls | Toronto, Ontario, Canada |
| | Vitti 28'; Robinson (yellow card) 41'; De Rosario 59'; Serioux (yellow card) 78' | Report | Richards (yellow card) 78' | Stadium: BMO Field; Attendance: 20,902; Referee: Baldomero Toledo |

| June 27, 2009 | Columbus Crew | 1–0 | New York Red Bulls | Columbus, Ohio |
| | Carroll (yellow card) 34'; Marshall 45'; Schelotto (yellow card) 79' | | Stammler (yellow card) 76' | Stadium: Columbus Crew Stadium; Attendance: 15,575; Referee: Ricardo Salazar |

| July 4, 2009 | FC Dallas | 2–1 | New York Red Bulls | Frisco, Texas |
| | Cunningham 15'; Cunningham 17'; Ricchetti (yellow card) 74' | Report | Angel 43' | Stadium: Pizza Hut Park; Attendance: 14,327; Referee: Kevin Stott |

| July 16, 2009 | New York Red Bulls | 1–3 | Los Angeles Galaxy | East Rutherford, New Jersey |
| | Angel 87' (pen.); Rojas (yellow card) 90' | Report | Eskandarian 3'; Berhalter (yellow card) 10'; Eskandarian (yellow card) 28'; Donovan 31'; Lewis 45' | Stadium: Giants Stadium; Attendance: 23,238; Referee: Shane Moody |

| July 25, 2009 | Colorado Rapids | 4–0 | New York Red Bulls | Commerce City, Colorado |
| | Peterson 5'; Baudet (yellow card) 34'; Noonan 46'; LaBrocca 61'; Ballouchy 67' | Report | Krupnik (yellow card) 33'; Ubiparipovic (red card) 45'; Petke (yellow card) 68' | Stadium: Dick's Sporting Goods Park; Attendance: 16,816; Referee: Jasen Anno |

| August 15, 2009 | New York Red Bulls | 0–2 | Chivas USA | East Rutherford, New Jersey |
| | Petke (yellow card) 70' | Report | Galindo 15'; Jazic (yellow card) 36'; Kljestan (yellow card) 47+'; Stepanovic (yellow card) 77'; Lillingston 92+' | Stadium: Giants Stadium; Attendance: 10,556; Referee: Kevin Stott |

| August 23, 2009 | New York Red Bulls | 3–2 | FC Dallas | East Rutherford, New Jersey |
| | Angel 4'; Richards 27'; Wolyniec (yellow card) 55'; Goldthwaite (red card) 60'; Hall (yellow card) 86'; Angel 88'; Stammler (yellow card) 90+1'; Kandji (yellow card) 90+2' | Report | McCarty 19'; Ricchetti (yellow card) 56' van den Bergh 72' | Stadium: Giants Stadium; Attendance: 9,648; Referee: Jasen Anno |

| August 30, 2009 | New York Red Bulls | 1–0 | Columbus Crew | East Rutherford, New Jersey |
| | Borman (yellow card) 46+'; Ubiparipovic (yellow card) 53'; Richards 63'; Johnson (yellow card) 72' | Report | Ekpo (yellow card) 37'; Hejduk (yellow card) 63'; Brunner (yellow card) 83' | Stadium: Giants Stadium; Attendance: 10,323; Referee: Ricardo Salazar |

| September 12, 2009 | New York Red Bulls | 0–1 | Kansas City Wizards | East Rutherford, New Jersey |
| | Stammler (yellow card) 37'; Johnson (yellow card) 61' | Report | Wolff 10'; Hirsig (yellow card) 41'; Leathers (yellow card) 47'; Jewsbury (yellow card) 74'; Hartman (yellow card) 91+' | Stadium: Giants Stadium; Attendance: 10,234; Referee: Mark Geiger |

| September 18, 2009 | New York Red Bulls | 1–1 | New England Revolution | East Rutherford, New Jersey |
| | Petke (yellow card) 21'; Boyens (yellow card) 31'; Celades (yellow card) 55'; Wolyniec 69' | Report | Nyassi 13'; Dube (yellow card) 73' | Stadium: Giants Stadium; Attendance: 10,979; Referee: Hilario Grajeda |

| September 26, 2009 | Chivas USA | 1–1 | New York Red Bulls | Carson, California |
| | Kljestan 64' | Report | Celades (yellow card) 56'; Angel 84' | Stadium: The Home Depot Center; Attendance: 14,211; Referee: Alex Prus |

| October 3, 2009 | San Jose Earthquakes | 1–0 | New York Red Bulls | Santa Clara, California |
| | Johnson 24' (pen.) | Report | Richards (yellow card) 46+' | Stadium: Buck Shaw Stadium; Attendance: 10,525; Referee: Steven DePiero |

| October 14, 2009 | Real Salt Lake | 2–0 | New York Red Bulls | Sandy, Utah |
| | Beltran (yellow card) 3'; Johnson (yellow card) 59'; Williams 80'; Espindola 90' | Report | Borman (yellow card) 38'; Boyens (yellow card) 86' | Stadium: Rio Tinto Stadium; Attendance: 16,247; Referee: Baldomero Toledo |

| October 24, 2009 | New York Red Bulls | 5–0 | Toronto FC | East Rutherford, New Jersey, United States |
| | Kandji 3'; Ángel 33'; Ángel 62'; Kandji 70'; Mbuta 94+' (pen.) | Report | White (yellow card) 60' | Stadium: Giants Stadium; Attendance: 21,305; Referee: Alex Prus |

=== U.S. Open Cup qualification ===
| April 29, 2009 | San Jose Earthquakes | 1–2 | New York Red Bulls | Santa Clara, California |
| | Salinas (yellow card) 39'; Campos (yellow card) 47'; Denton (yellow card) 67'; Campos 71' | Report | Petke 2'; Sassano (yellow card) 76'; Wolyniec 80'; Pietravallo (yellow card) 82' | Stadium: Buck Shaw Stadium; Attendance: 4,011; Referee: Alejandro Mariscal |

| May 20, 2009 | New York Red Bulls | 3–5 | D.C. United | Washington, D.C. |
| 19:00 EDT | Richards 44'; Rojas 48', 61' (pen.) | Report | Pontius 8', 52'; Khumalo 18'; Barklage 21'; Fred 28' | Stadium: Robert F. Kennedy Memorial Stadium; Attendance: 5,056; Referee: Mark Kadlecik |

=== CONCACAF Champions League ===
| July 30, 2009 Preliminary | W Connection (Trinidad and Tobago) | 2–2 | (United States) New York Red Bulls | Manny Ramjohn Stadium, Marabella |
| 20:00 ECT (UTC-4) | Frias 40'; Hector 72' | Report | Öbster 47'; Joseph 60' (o.g.) | Attendance: 6,500; Referee: Raymond Bogle (Jamaica) |

| August 5, 2009 Preliminary | New York Red Bulls (United States) | 1–2 | (Trinidad and Tobago) W Connection | East Rutherford, New Jersey |
| | Wolyniec 19' | Report | Toussaint 40' 45' | Stadium: Giants Stadium; Attendance: 6,549; Referee: Paul Ward (Canada) |
