= 2008 New York Red Bulls season =

New York Red Bulls
2008 season
- Chairman: Red Bull GmbH
- Manager: Juan Carlos Osorio
Home colors	Away colors

The 2008 season was the 13th season of New York Red Bulls's franchise existence. They played their home games at Giants Stadium in East Rutherford, New Jersey. Juan Carlos Osorio made his debut as the Red Bulls coach after being hired in December 2007.

Despite finishing eighth of 14 teams on the MLS league table this season, the Red Bulls -- with 39 points (10W-11L-9D) and a negative goal difference -- made a run to the MLS Cup final, advancing as Western Conference champions despite playing in the East. The club would fall to Columbus Crew in the final, 3–1. This would be the franchise's last Cup final appearance until 2024, in the same stadium, where they would also lose to the host LA Galaxy. They would reach the US Open Cup Final in 2017 playing Sporting Kansas City.

The Red Bulls were upset in the U.S. Open Cup by Crystal Palace Baltimore.

== Statistics ==
=== Appearances and goals ===
Last updated on August 19, 2008.

No.	Pos	Nat	Player	Total		MLS Season	
No.	Pos	Nat	Player	Apps	Goals	Apps	Goals
2	DF	(United States) USA	Kevin Goldthwaite	20	2	20	2
3	DF	(United States) USA	Hunter Freeman	12	0	12	0
4	DF	(United States) USA	Carlos Mendes	14	0	14	0
6	DF	(United States) USA	Seth Stammler	17	1	17	1
7	FW	(United States) USA	Mike Magee	17	3	17	3
8	MF	(Bosnia and Herzegovina) BIH	Siniša Ubiparipović	13	1	13	1
9	FW	(Colombia) COL	Juan Pablo Ángel	13	7	13	7
10	MF	(United States) USA	Claudio Reyna	6	0	6	0
11	MF	(Netherlands) NED	Dave van den Bergh	18	5	18	5
12	MF	(South Africa) RSA	Danleigh Borman	11	2	11	2
13	MF	(Venezuela) VEN	Jorge Rojas	4	0	4	0
15	FW	(United States) USA	John Wolyniec	15	0	15	0
17	FW	(United States) USA	Jozy Altidore	8	3	8	3
17	MF	(Venezuela) VEN	Gabriel Cichero	2	0	2	0
18	GK	(United States) USA	Jon Conway	20	0	20	0
19	MF	(Jamaica) JAM	Dane Richards	14	0	14	0
20	FW	(Colombia) COL	Oscar Echeverry	9	0	9	0
23	MF	(Argentina) ARG	Juan Pietravallo	4	0	4	0
26	FW	(United States) USA	Chris Megaloudis	1	0	1	0
27	DF	(New Zealand) NZL	Andrew Boyens	12	0	12	0
32	MF	(United States) USA	Luke Sassano	16	0	16	0
33	DF	(United States) USA	Chris Leitch	10	0	10	0
60	DF	(United States) USA	Jeff Parke	18	0	18	0

=== Disciplinary record ===
Disciplinary records for 2008 league matches. Players with 1 card or more included only.

No.	Nat.	Player	Yellow cards	Red cards
2	(United States)	Kevin Goldthwaite	5	0
4	(United States)	Carlos Mendes	1	0
6	(United States)	Seth Stammler	3	0
7	(United States)	Mike Magee	1	0
8	(Bosnia and Herzegovina)	Siniša Ubiparipović	4	0
9	(Colombia)	Juan Pablo Ángel	1	0
11	(Netherlands)	Dave van den Bergh	2	1
12	(South Africa)	Danleigh Borman	1	0
13	(Venezuela)	Jorge Rojas	1	0
15	(United States)	John Wolyniec	1	0
17	(Venezuela)	Gabriel Cichero	1	1
19	(Jamaica)	Dane Richards	1	0
20	(Colombia)	Oscar Echeverry	1	0
23	(Argentina)	Juan Pietravallo	1	0
27	(New Zealand)	Andrew Boyens	3	0
32	(United States)	Luke Sassano	2	0
60	(United States)	Jeff Parke	2	1

== Pre-season ==
February 12, 2008

CD Chivas USA	1 – 0	New York Red Bulls
Razov 4'	(Report)

Home Depot Center, California

February 15, 2008

Hammarby	1 – 3	New York Red Bulls
Dadómo 66'	(Report)	Echeverry 8'; Ángel 13' (pen.); Brunner 28'

Home Depot Center, California

March 3, 2008

Red Bull Salzburg (reserves)	1 – 0	New York Red Bulls
Vasilj 70'	(Report)

Wals Siezenheim Stadium, Salzburg

March 6, 2008

Red Bull Salzburg (reserves)	2 – 3	New York Red Bulls
Janočko 47'; Rakić 53'	(Report)	Ángel 59'; Sassano 66'; Magee 78'

Wals Siezenheim Stadium, Salzburg
Referee: R. Gruber

March 17, 2008

College of Charleston	0 – 1	New York Red Bulls
	(Report)	Brunner 71'

Charleston, South Carolina

March 28, 2008

Carolina RailHawks	0 – 1	New York Red Bulls
	(Report)	Van den Bergh 27'

WakeMed Soccer Park, Cary, North Carolina
Attendance: 5,426
Referee: Lee Suckle

== Carolina Challenge Cup ==
March 16, 2008

Charleston Battery	1 – 1	New York Red Bulls
Kenga 80'	(Report)	Mesa 79'

Blackbaud Stadium, Charleston, South Carolina

March 19, 2008

Toronto FC	1 – 1	New York Red Bulls
Cunningham 10'	(Report)	Wolyniec 78'

Blackbaud Stadium, Charleston, South Carolina
Referee: Carol-Anne Chenard

March 22, 2008

San Jose Earthquakes	3 – 0	New York Red Bulls
Kamara 1'; Glinton 49'; Brunner 88' (o.g.)	(Report)

Blackbaud Stadium, Charleston, South Carolina
Referee: Andrew Chapin

== MLS season ==
April 5 1	Columbus Crew	0–2	New York Red Bulls	Giants Stadium
19:30 EST		(Report)	Van den Bergh 1'; Goldthwaite 8'	Stadium: Columbus Crew Stadium; Attendance: 17,119; Referee: Alex Prus

April 12	New York Red Bulls	0 – 2	FC Dallas	Pizza Hut Park
20:30 EST		(Report)	Álvarez 1'; Cooper 66'	Attendance: 11,564; Referee: Jair Marrufo

April 19	New England Revolution	1 – 1	New York Red Bulls	Giants Stadium
19:30 EST	Larentowicz 56'	(Report)	Altidore 30'	Attendance: 12,047; Referee: Ricardo Salazar

April 27	San Jose Earthquakes	0 – 2	New York Red Bulls	Giants Stadium
19:30 EST		(Report)	Magee 79' (pen.); Altidore 90+5'	Attendance: 9,053; Referee: Michael Kennedy

May 1	New York Red Bulls	1 – 1	Toronto FC	BMO Field
19:00 EST	Van den Bergh 39'	(Report)	Vélez 22'	Attendance: 19,816; Referee: Abiodun Okulaja

May 10	New York Red Bulls	2 – 1	Los Angeles Galaxy	The Home Depot Center
22:30 EST	Borman 21'; Ángel 78'	(Report)	Gordon 77'	Attendance: 27,000; Referee: Alex Prus

May 17	Kansas City Wizards	1 – 1	New York Red Bulls	Giants Stadium
19:30 EST	Conrad 20'	(Report)	Borman 81'	Attendance: 15,755; Referee: Jair Marrufo

May 25	Chicago Fire	5 – 1	New York Red Bulls	Giants Stadium
15:00 EST	Barrett 8', 60'; Rolfe 48'; Blanco 55' (pen.); Segares 62'	(Report)	Altidore 74'	Attendance: 14,754; Referee: Ricardo Salazar

May 31	New York Red Bulls	0 – 1	Houston Dynamo	Robertson Stadium
19:30 EST		(Report)	Ching 68'	Attendance: 17,204; Referee: Ricardo Salazar

June 5	CD Chivas USA	0 – 1	New York Red Bulls	Giants Stadium
19:30 EST		(Report)	Ángel 75'	Attendance: 9,521; Referee: Alex Prus

June 14	New York Red Bulls	1 – 4	D.C. United	RFK Stadium
19:30 EST	Van den Bergh 54'	(Report)	Emilio 23'; Simms 26'; Emilio 45+1', 59'	Attendance: 18,622; Referee: Kevin Stott

June 18	New York Red Bulls	1 – 1	New England Revolution	Gillette Stadium
19:30 EST	Stammler 37'	(Report)	Ralston 79'	Attendance: 10,596; Referee: Joe Caroccio

June 21	FC Dallas	0 – 1	New York Red Bulls	Giants Stadium
19:30 EST		(Report)	Goldthwaite 16'	Attendance: 16,427; Referee: Terry Vaughn

June 28	New York Red Bulls	1 – 1	Chivas USA	The Home Depot Center
22:30 EST	Van den Bergh 26'	(Report)	Razov 45+4'	Attendance: 16,379; Referee: Mauricio Navarro

July 4	New York Red Bulls	0 – 4	Colorado Rapids	Dick's Sporting Goods Park
21:30 EST		(Report)	McManus 24'; Ballouchy 36'; Clark 49'; Cummings 68'	Attendance: 18,776; Referee: Tim Weyland

July 10	New York Red Bulls	1 – 2	Kansas City Wizards	CommunityAmerica Ballpark
20:00 EST	Ángel 71'	(Report)	Conrad 11'; Arnaud 47'	Attendance: 8,773; Referee: Jasen Anno

July 19	Los Angeles Galaxy	2 – 2	New York Red Bulls	Giants Stadium
18:30 EST	Ruiz 29'; Donovan 90+2'	(Report)	Van den Bergh 35'; Ángel 71'	Attendance: 46,754; Referee: Baldomero Toledo

July 27	New York Red Bulls	1 – 1	San Jose Earthquakes	Buck Shaw Stadium
15:00 EST	Denton 4' (o.g.)	(Report)	Huckerby 13'	Attendance: 9,046; Referee: Ricardo Salazar

August 10	D.C. United	1 – 4	New York Red Bulls	Giants Stadium
17:00 EST	Moreno 16'	(Report)	Ángel 27', 50'; Magee 45'; Ubiparipović 87'	Attendance: 15,038; Referee: Shane Moody

August 17	Toronto FC	0 – 2	New York Red Bulls	Giants Stadium
17:00 EST		(Report)	Magee 37'; Ángel 90+2'	Attendance: 11,119; Referee: Terry Vaughn

August 24	Houston Dynamo	0 – 3	New York Red Bulls	Giants Stadium
15:00 EST		(Report)	Ángel 8'; Richards 26'; Magee 60'	Attendance: 12,549; Referee: Edvin Jurisevic

August 30	New York Red Bulls	0 – 0	D.C. United	RFK Stadium
19:30 EST		(Report)		Attendance: 15,616; Referee: Kevin Stott

September 6	New York Red Bulls	0 – 1	Chicago Fire	Toyota Park
20:30 EST		(Report)	King 36'	Attendance: 16,776; Referee: Mauricio Navarro

September 13	Real Salt Lake	1 – 2	New York Red Bulls	Giants Stadium
19:30 EST	Movsisyan 38'	(Report)	Ángel 49'; Van den Bergh 64'	Attendance: 11,692; Referee: Kevin Stott

September 18	New York Red Bulls	1 – 3	Columbus Crew	Columbus Crew Stadium
19:00 EST	Ángel 21'	(Report)	Hejduk 41'; Rogers 46'; Gaven 85'	Attendance: 10,881; Referee: Alex Prus

September 27	Colorado Rapids	5 – 4	New York Red Bulls	Giants Stadium
19:30 EST	Cummings 3'; Casey 11', 45', 90'; Petke 43'	(Report)	Magee 5'; Ángel 34'; Richards 40'; Mbuta 74'	Attendance: 14,795; Referee: Baldomero Toledo

October 4	Toronto FC	3 – 1	New York Red Bulls	Giants Stadium
19:30 EST	Barrett 27'; Barrett 65'; Ibrahim 86'	(Report)	Richards 49'	Attendance: 13,756; Referee: Ramon Hernandez

October 9	New York Red Bulls	1 – 1	Real Salt Lake	Rio Tinto Stadium
22:00 EST	Van den Bergh 31'	(Report)	Olave 41'	Attendance: 20,008; Referee: Terry Vaughn

September 18	Columbus Crew	1 – 3	New York Red Bulls	Giants Stadium
19:30 EST	Lenhart 67'	(Report)	Ángel 48', 76'; Cepero 83'	Attendance: 18,546; Referee: Michael Kennedy

October 23	New York Red Bulls	2 – 5	Chicago Fire	Toyota Park
21:00 EST	Ángel 32'; Kandji 88'	(Report)	Rolfe 11', 38', 44'; McBride 53'; Woolard 75'	Attendance: 13,274; Referee: Baldomero Toledo

== U.S. Open Cup ==
July 1, 2008
19:30 EST

New York Red Bulls	0 – 2	Crystal Palace Baltimore
	(Report)	Marshall 18'; Brooks 75'

Lawrence E. Knight Stadium
Annapolis, Maryland
Attendance: 1,654
Referee: Andrew Chapin

== Mid-season friendlies ==
June 25, 2008
23:00 EST

New York Red Bulls	1 – 0	Guadalajara
Echeverry 22'	(Report)

University of Phoenix Stadium
Glendale, Arizona
Referee: Ricardo Salazar

August 6, 2008
19:00 EST

Barcelona	6 – 2	New York Red Bulls
Xavi 17'; Eto'o 18', 43'; Márquez 24'; Jeffrén 80'; Pedro 85'	(Report)	Stammler 30'; Rojas 60'

Giants Stadium
East Rutherford, New Jersey
Attendance: 38,152
Referee: Kevin Stott

== MLS Playoffs ==
November 1, 2008
16:00 EST

Houston Dynamo	1 – 1	New York Red Bulls
Kamara 85'	(Report)	Ángel 48'

Giants Stadium
East Rutherford, New Jersey
Attendance: 11,578
Referee: Kevin Stott

November 9, 2008
15:00 EST

New York Red Bulls	3 – 0	Houston Dynamo
Richards 25'; Ángel 36'; Wolyniec 81'	(Report)

Robertson Stadium
Houston, Texas
Attendance: 30,053
Referee: Baldomero Toledo

November 15, 2008
21:30 EST

New York Red Bulls	1 – 0	Real Salt Lake
Van den Bergh 28'	(Report)

Rio Tinto Stadium
Sandy, Utah
Attendance: 20,008
Referee: Jair Marrufo

== MLS Cup ==
November 23, 2008
15:30 EST

New York Red Bulls	1 – 3	Columbus Crew
Wolyniec 51'	(Report)	Moreno 31'; Marshall 53'; Hejduk 82'

The Home Depot Center
Carson, California
Attendance: 27,000
Referee: Baldomero Toledo

== See also ==
- 2008 Major League Soccer season
