= MLS Cup 2008 =

2008 edition of the MLS Cup

- Event: MLS Cup
Columbus Crew	New York Red Bulls
3	1
- Date: November 23, 2008
- Venue: Home Depot Center, Carson, California, US
- MLS Cup MVP: Guillermo Barros Schelotto (Columbus Crew)
- Referee: Baldomero Toledo
- Attendance: 27,000
- Weather: Cloudy, 68 °F (20 °C)

MLS Cup 2008 was the 13th edition of the MLS Cup, the championship match of Major League Soccer (MLS). The soccer match took place on November 23, 2008, at the Home Depot Center in Carson, California, near Los Angeles. It was contested between Columbus Crew and New York Red Bulls, both from the league's Eastern Conference.

Both finalists were making their first appearance at the MLS Cup, having historically exited the playoffs in earlier rounds. Columbus won the Supporters' Shield with the most regular season points and defeated Kansas City and the Chicago Fire in the playoffs to reach the final. The Red Bulls finished the regular season with a losing record and were seeded into the Western Conference bracket as a wildcard, eliminating defending champions Houston and Real Salt Lake in the process.

Columbus won the game by a score of 3–1 with goals from Alejandro Moreno, Chad Marshall, and Frankie Hejduk — all assisted by Guillermo Barros Schelotto. Schelotto was named man of the match, adding to his MVP award from the regular season. Sigi Schmid became the first manager to win the MLS Cup with two different teams, shortly before leaving the Crew to coach Seattle Sounders FC.

== Venue ==
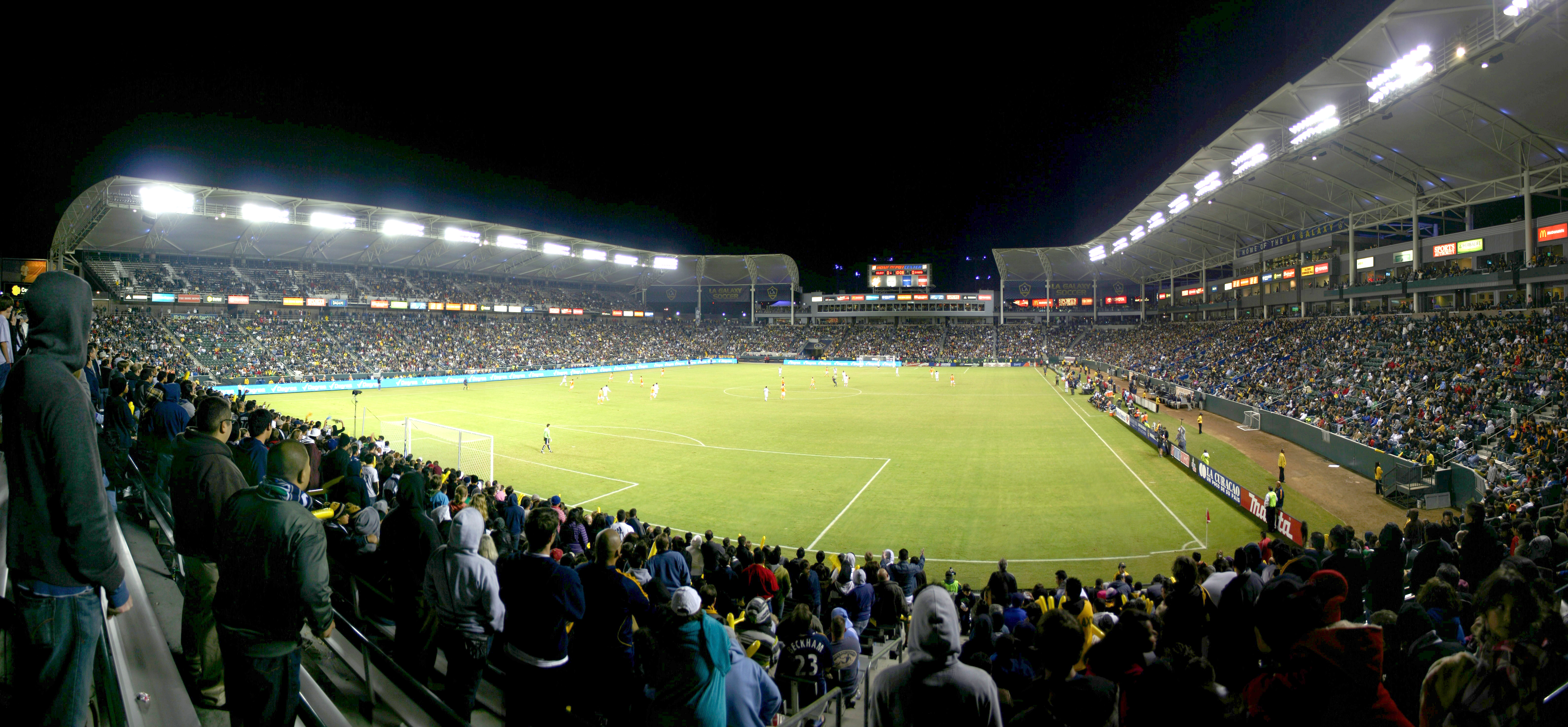
The Home Depot Center at night, pictured in 2009

The Home Depot Center in Carson, California, home to the Los Angeles Galaxy and Chivas USA, was announced as the venue for the 2008 edition of the MLS Cup on November 19, 2007. It marked the third time that the stadium had hosted the MLS Cup final, following back-to-back editions in 2003 and 2004. The stadium opened in June 2003 and has a capacity of 27,000, making it the largest soccer-specific stadium in the United States. The Home Depot Center also hosted the 2003 MLS All-Star Game, the 2003 FIFA Women's World Cup Final, the 2007 SuperLiga final, and two editions of the CONCACAF Gold Cup. The stadium and its grounds are also used for annual training camps by the U.S. men's national team.

== Road to the final ==
The MLS Cup is the post-season championship of Major League Soccer (MLS), a professional club soccer league in the United States and Canada. The 2008 season was the 13th in MLS history, and was contested by 14 teams in two conferences. Each club played 30 matches during the regular season from March to October, facing each team twice and two in-conference teams a third time. The playoffs, running from October 30 to November 23, were contested by the top three clubs in each conference and two wild card teams in the next positions regardless of conference. It was organized into three rounds: a home-and-away series in the Conference Semifinals, a single-match Conference Final, and the MLS Cup final.

The 2008 edition of the MLS Cup was contested by the Columbus Crew and New York Red Bulls, both first-time finalists. It also marked the first time that two teams from the Eastern Conference played each other in the MLS Cup final. The Crew and Red Bulls played each other three times in the regular season, with New York winning 2–0 and 3–1 at home in April and October, respectively, and Columbus winning 3–1 at home in September. The mayors of Columbus and New York made a ceremonial bet prior to the match, promising to exchange local foods and beer to the winning city.

=== Columbus Crew ===
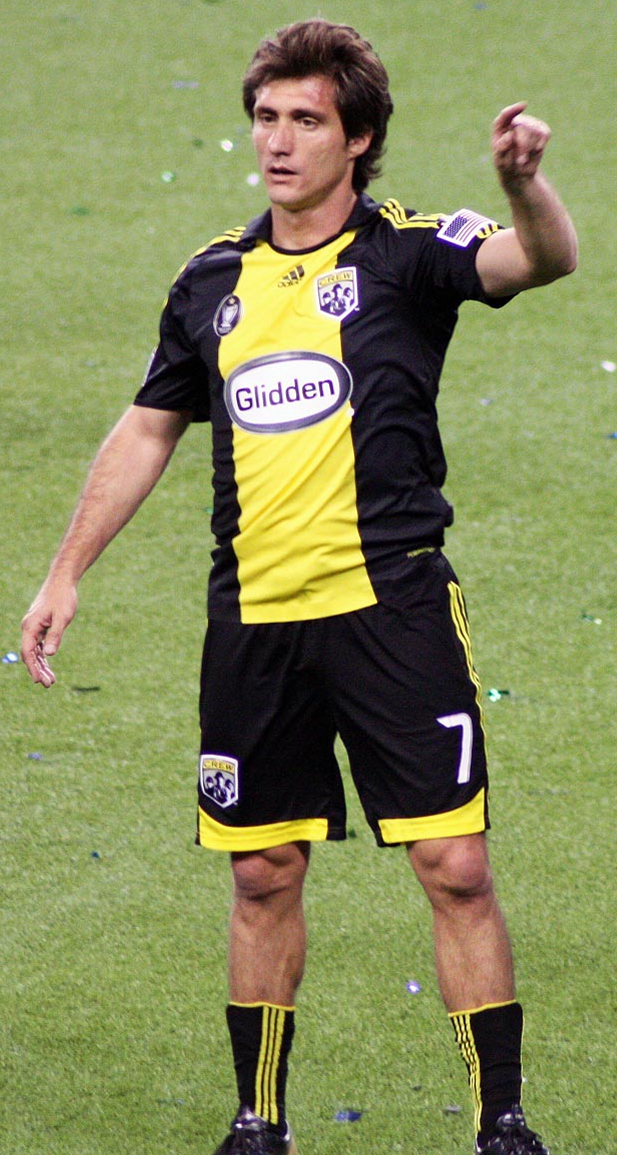
Argentine forward Guillermo Barros Schelotto, pictured in 2009, led the league in assists during their run to the MLS Cup

The Columbus Crew hired manager Sigi Schmid at the end of the 2005 season to lead a rebuilding process after the team finished at the bottom of the Eastern Conference. Schmid had previously managed the Los Angeles Galaxy, leading them to three MLS Cup finals appearances and winning in 2002. His first season with Columbus ended with a last-place finish, but by 2007 the team had acquired veteran players Alejandro Moreno and Ezra Hendrickson along with rookies Brad Evans and Robbie Rogers for use in the lineup, which only included three players from the 2005 roster. Argentine forward Guillermo Barros Schelotto was signed in April 2007 and led the team as it fell several points short of playoff qualification in the final weeks of the season.

With an adjustment in offensive tactics and an increased reliance on Schelotto as the central playmaker, the Crew claimed the 2008 Supporters' Shield with the best record in the league. Columbus began the season with six wins in its first eight matches, followed by an unbeaten streak of nine matches near the end of the season. The Crew clinched the Supporters' Shield with 57 points, including 17 wins, both club records. Schmid won MLS Coach of the Year for the team's performance and run to the cup. Schelotto led the league in assists (with 19) and scored seven regular season goals, winning the league's most valuable player award. He was named to the MLS Best XI alongside teammates Robbie Rogers and Chad Marshall, who also won Defender of the Year.

The Crew played against the Kansas City Wizards in the Eastern Conference Semifinals, drawing 1–1 in the first away leg on a goal scored by substitute Steven Lenhart in stoppage time. During the second leg at Crew Stadium, Columbus took an early lead with an 8th-minute goal scored by Brad Evans and extended it with a Robbie Rogers goal in the 57th minute to win 2–0. Columbus hosted rivals Chicago Fire in the Conference Final, which began with a 1–0 halftime lead for the Fire after a goal in the 29th minute scored by former Crew forward Brian McBride. Columbus equalized early in the second half on a header by defender Chad Marshall in the 49th minute, which was followed by a 55th-minute goal by Eddie Gaven to win the match 2–1. The Crew clinched the Eastern Conference championship and a place in their second-ever cup final match, the first being the 2002 U.S. Open Cup.

=== New York Red Bulls ===
The New York Red Bulls finished the 2007 season as the third seed in the Eastern Conference, but lost in the first round of the playoffs to the New England Revolution. The team began the 2008 season, their second under the Red Bull brand, with Colombian manager Juan Carlos Osorio replacing Bruce Arena as head coach. The season was tumultuous, with the Red Bulls losing young striker Jozy Altidore on a transfer and captain Claudio Reyna to retirement in July. The team's other star striker, Juan Pablo Ángel, recovered from back and hamstring injuries to lead the Red Bulls to a playoff berth on the final day of the season, finishing ahead of D.C. United with only 39 points and a losing record. During the final weeks of the season, the Red Bulls lost two players to suspensions for violating the league's drug policy; goalkeeper Jon Conway was replaced by backup goalkeeper Danny Cepero, who scored the first goal by a keeper in his debut for the team against the Columbus Crew.

The Red Bulls were seeded fourth in the Western Conference bracket as a wild card and played Houston Dynamo in the Conference Semifinals. After a 1–1 draw at Giants Stadium in New Jersey, the Red Bulls won 3–0 in Houston to advance 4–1 on aggregate over the two-time defending MLS Cup champions. In the Western Conference final, played away to Real Salt Lake, the Red Bulls took a 1–0 lead on a 28th-minute goal by Dave van den Bergh. Salt Lake then hit Cepero's goalpost three times, but were unable to score an equalizer and allowed the Red Bulls to advance to their first MLS Cup final. The final would be the first MLS title to be contested by the Red Bulls, who had failed to win trophies in its previous 13 seasons and only advanced from the first round of the playoffs once before.

=== Summary of results ===
Note: In all results below, the score of the finalist is given first (H: home; A: away).

Columbus Crew				Round	New York Red Bulls			
1st place in Eastern Conference: Pos. / Team / Pld / W / L / D / Pts; 1 / Columbus Crew (SS) / 30 / 17 / 7 / 6 / 57; 2 / Chicago Fire / 30 / 13 / 10 / 7 / 46; 3 / New England Revolution / 30 / 12 / 11 / 7 / 43; 4 / Kansas City Wizards / 30 / 11 / 10 / 9 / 42; 5 / New York Red Bulls / 30 / 10 / 11 / 9 / 39; Source: MLS Qualified for playoffs Supporters' Shield winner				Regular season	5th place in Eastern Conference (Seeded into Western Conference bracket): Pos. / Team / Pld / W / L / D / Pts; 3 / New England Revolution / 30 / 12 / 11 / 7 / 43; 4 / Kansas City Wizards / 30 / 11 / 10 / 9 / 42; 5 / New York Red Bulls / 30 / 10 / 11 / 9 / 39; 6 / D.C. United / 30 / 11 / 15 / 4 / 37; 7 / Toronto FC / 30 / 9 / 13 / 8 / 35; Source: MLS Qualified for playoffs			
Opponent	Agg.	1st leg	2nd leg	MLS Cup Playoffs	Opponent	Agg.	1st leg	2nd leg
Kansas City Wizards	3–1	1–1 (A)	2–0 (H)	Conference Semifinals	Houston Dynamo	4–1	1–1 (H)	3–0 (A)
Chicago Fire	2–1 (H)			Conference Final	Real Salt Lake	1–0 (A)		

== Broadcasting and entertainment ==
The MLS Cup final was televised in the United States on ABC in English and TeleFutura in Spanish. English play-by-play commentary was provided by JP Dellacamera with color analysis by John Harkes and studio analysis by Rob Stone, Julie Foudy, and Alexi Lalas. The ABC broadcast was produced by ESPN and featured 20 cameras and the use of a virtual replay system. The match was broadcast in Canada on CBC and CBC Bold, with English commentary by Nigel Reed and Jason DeVos. It was also carried in 142 countries on ESPN International and an additional 23 countries in Europe by local broadcasters.

Recording artist Colby O'Donis performed the national anthem and indie pop group Chester French headlined a pregame festival at the final.

== Match ==
=== Summary ===
The 2008 final marked the debut of the Philip F. Anschutz Trophy, replacing the former MLS Cup trophy. Baldomero Toledo was refereeing his first MLS Cup and was among the first professional referees in the United States. Both teams played in their home kits for the final, with Columbus in gold and the Red Bulls in white and red. The match kicked off in sunny weather in front of 27,000 spectators, including several thousand Crew fans who re-created the "Nordecke" in the northeastern corner of the Home Depot Center.

Columbus entered the match as favorites and attempted to score on a play that was ruled offside, but were outplayed by the Red Bulls in the opening 30 minutes of the match and conceded several scoring chances and attacking set-pieces. John Wolyniec and Juan Pablo Ángel missed close-range shots on the Columbus goal, while the Crew pressed with a counterattack in the 31st minute to score the opening goal. Guillermo Barros Schelotto regained possession of the ball and passed it to Alejandro Moreno, who dribbled it up the right flank and shot passed defender Diego Jiménez and goalkeeper Danny Cepero.

New York began the second half by trying to find an equalizing goal and tied the match 1–1 after six minutes, with a zig-zag run by Dane Richards and a pass to the sliding Wolyniec in front of the Columbus goal. The Crew restored their lead less than 90 seconds later, as defender Chad Marshall headed in a corner kick by Schelotto in the 52nd minute that went past Cepero. While the Red Bulls sought a second equalizer, including a shot by Richards that was saved by goalkeeper Will Hesmer, Columbus continued to push with attacks led by Frankie Hejduk, who sent in several crosses into the six-yard box. Schelotto himself attempted to score with a long-range shot in the 77th minute that struck the crossbar. Three minutes later, Moreno and Eddie Gaven would find Schelotto, who scooped a looping ball from the top of the box towards a running Hejduk. Hejduk headed the ball, scoring the Crew's third and final goal of the match. The Crew held onto the 3–1 lead and won their first MLS Cup championship.

=== Details ===
November 23, 2008
12:30 pm PST

Columbus Crew	3–1	New York Red Bulls
Moreno 31'; Marshall 53'; Hejduk 82'	Report	Wolyniec 51'

Home Depot Center, Carson, California
Attendance: 27,000
Referee: Baldomero Toledo

Columbus Crew	New York Red Bulls

GK	1	(United States) Will Hesmer
DF	2	(United States) Frankie Hejduk (c)
DF	14	(United States) Chad Marshall
DF	5	(United States) Danny O'Rourke
DF	4	(Argentina) Gino Padula	(yellow card) 68'
MF	16	(United States) Brian Carroll
MF	3	(United States) Brad Evans
MF	12	(United States) Eddie Gaven	(substituted off) 90+3'
MF	19	(United States) Robbie Rogers
FW	7	(Argentina) Guillermo Barros Schelotto	(substituted off) 90+1'
FW	10	(Venezuela) Alejandro Moreno
Substitutions:
GK	18	(United States) Kenny Schoeni
GK	30	(United States) Andy Gruenebaum
DF	6	(England) Andy Iro	(substituted on) 90+1'
DF	23	(Saint Vincent and the Grenadines) Ezra Hendrickson
MF	15	(Brazil) Stefani Miglioranzi
MF	17	(Nigeria) Emmanuel Ekpo
FW	11	(United States) Pat Noonan
FW	32	(United States) Steven Lenhart	(substituted on) 90+3'
Manager:
(United States) Sigi Schmid

GK	1	(United States) Danny Cepero
DF	2	(United States) Kevin Goldthwaite
DF	29	(Mexico) Diego Jiménez
DF	33	(United States) Chris Leitch	(yellow card) 4'
DF	4	(United States) Carlos Mendes
MF	19	(Jamaica) Dane Richards
MF	32	(United States) Luke Sassano	(substituted off) 78'
MF	8	(Bosnia and Herzegovina) Siniša Ubiparipović
MF	11	(Netherlands) Dave van den Bergh
FW	9	(Colombia) Juan Pablo Ángel (c)
FW	15	(United States) John Wolyniec	(substituted off) 82'
Substitutions:
GK	18	(United States) Jon Conway
GK	24	(Puerto Rico) Terry Boss
GK	40	(United States) Caleb Patterson-Sewell
DF	27	(Australia) Andrew Boyens
MF	13	(Venezuela) Jorge Rojas	(substituted on) 78'
MF	17	(Venezuela) Gabriel Cichero
MF	23	(Argentina) Juan Pietravallo
FW	7	(United States) Mike Magee
FW	10	(Senegal) Macoumba Kandji	(substituted on) 82'
Manager:
(Colombia) Juan Carlos Osorio

MLS Cup Most Valuable Player:
(Argentina) Guillermo Barros Schelotto (Columbus Crew)

Assistant referees:
Greg Barkey
Kermit Quisenberry
Fourth official:
Mark Geiger

Match rules:

- 90 minutes.
- 30 minutes of extra time if necessary.
- Penalty shootout if scores still level.
- Seven named substitutes.
- Maximum of three substitutions.

== Post-match ==
The Crew became the fourth club to win both MLS Cup and the Supporters' Shield in the same season, following D.C. United (1997, 1999), Sporting Kansas City (2000), and Los Angeles Galaxy (2002). Guillermo Barros Schelotto was named the match's most valuable player for his three assists—surpassing the MLS Cup record—and became the third player to win both the MLS Cup MVP and league MVP awards. Will Hesmer became the first MLS player to celebrate their birthday on the day of an MLS Cup final and the first goalkeeper to record zero saves during the final. Sigi Schmid became the first coach to win an MLS Cup with two different teams and was named the head coach of the expansion Seattle Sounders FC less than a month after the final.

The Crew celebrated with traveling fans at their hotel in Manhattan Beach, California, and were greeted at Port Columbus International Airport by Mayor Michael B. Coleman and hundreds of fans. The team was then honored at the Ohio Statehouse by Governor Ted Strickland with another crowd of supporters at a victory rally in below-freezing weather. Columbus finished the 2009 season as repeat Supporters' Shield champions under promoted coach Robert Warzycha, but failed to advance from the first round of the playoffs.

Both finalists qualified for the 2009–10 CONCACAF Champions League, with the winning Crew seeded directly into the group stage and runners-up Red Bulls entering in the preliminary round. The Red Bulls lost 4–3 on aggregate to Trinidad and Tobago club W Connection in the preliminary round, while the Crew advanced from the group stage and were eliminated in the quarterfinals by Deportivo Toluca after a 5–4 aggregate loss. Columbus and New York would meet again in the Eastern Conference Championship during the 2015 MLS Cup Playoffs, which ended in a 2–1 aggregate win for the Crew, who would host and lose the MLS Cup final to the Portland Timbers.
