= 2008 MLS Cup playoffs =

2008 edition of the MLS playoffs

Tournament details
- Country: United States
- Teams: 8

Final positions
- Champions: Columbus Crew (1st title)
- Runners-up: New York Red Bulls
- Semifinalists: Chicago Fire; Real Salt Lake

Tournament statistics
- Matches played: 11
- Goals scored: 25 (2.27 per match)
- Top goal scorer(s): (Colombia) Juan Pablo Ángel (United States) Chad Marshall (United States) John Wolyniec (2 goals each)

The 2008 MLS Cup playoffs was the postseason to Major League Soccer's 2008 season, and culminated with MLS Cup 2008 on November 23, 2008 at The Home Depot Center in Carson, California.

== Format ==
At the 2008 season's end, the top three teams of each conference made the playoffs; in addition, the clubs with the next two highest point totals, regardless of conference, were added to the playoffs. In the first round of this knockout tournament, aggregate goals over two matches determined the winners; the conference finals were one match each, with the winner of each conference advancing to MLS Cup 2008. In all rounds, the tie-breaking method was two 15-minute periods of extra time, followed by a penalty shoot-out if necessary. The away goals rule was not used.

== Qualified teams ==
=== Conference standings ===
Eastern Conference

Pos	Team	Pld	W	L	T	GF	GA	GD	Pts	Qualification
1	Columbus Crew	30	17	7	6	50	36	+14	57	Qualification for the conference semifinals
2	Chicago Fire	30	13	10	7	44	33	+11	46	Qualification for the conference semifinals
3	New England Revolution	30	12	11	7	40	43	−3	43	Qualification for the conference semifinals
4	Kansas City Wizards	30	11	10	9	37	39	−2	42	Qualification for the conference semifinals
5	New York Red Bulls	30	10	11	9	42	48	−6	39	Qualification for the conference semifinals
6	D.C. United	30	11	15	4	43	51	−8	37	
7	Toronto FC	30	9	13	8	34	43	−9	35	

Source: MLS

Western Conference

Pos	Team	Pld	W	L	T	GF	GA	GD	Pts	Qualification
1	Houston Dynamo	30	13	5	12	45	32	+13	51	Qualification for the conference semifinals
2	Chivas USA	30	12	11	7	40	41	−1	43	Qualification for the conference semifinals
3	Real Salt Lake	30	10	10	10	40	39	+1	40	Qualification for the conference semifinals
4	Colorado Rapids	30	11	14	5	44	45	−1	38	
5	FC Dallas	30	8	10	12	45	41	+4	36	
6	LA Galaxy	30	8	13	9	55	62	−7	33	
7	San Jose Earthquakes	30	8	13	9	32	38	−6	33	

Source: MLS

=== Overall standings ===
Pos	Team	Pld	W	L	T	GF	GA	GD	Pts	
1	Columbus Crew (C, S)	30	17	7	6	50	36	+14	57	Qualification for the CONCACAF Champions League
2	Houston Dynamo	30	13	5	12	45	32	+13	51	Qualification for the CONCACAF Champions League
3	Chicago Fire	30	13	10	7	44	33	+11	46	Qualification for the North American SuperLiga
4	Chivas USA	30	12	11	7	40	41	−1	43	Qualification for the North American SuperLiga
5	New England Revolution	30	12	11	7	40	43	−3	43	Qualification for the North American SuperLiga
6	Kansas City Wizards	30	11	10	9	37	39	−2	42	Qualification for the North American SuperLiga
7	Real Salt Lake	30	10	10	10	40	39	+1	40	
8	New York Red Bulls	30	10	11	9	42	48	−6	39	Qualification for the CONCACAF Champions League
9	Colorado Rapids	30	11	14	5	44	45	−1	38	
10	D.C. United (U)	30	11	15	4	43	51	−8	37	Qualification for the CONCACAF Champions League
11	FC Dallas	30	8	10	12	45	41	+4	36	
12	Toronto FC	30	9	13	8	34	43	−9	35	Qualification for the CONCACAF Champions League (Note: As winners of the 2009 Canadian Championship)
13	LA Galaxy	30	8	13	9	55	62	−7	33	
14	San Jose Earthquakes	30	8	13	9	32	38	−6	33	

Source: MLS
Rules for classification: 1) points; 2) head-to-head record; 3) goal difference; 4) number of goals scored
(C) MLS Cup champions; (S) Supporters' Shield winners; (U) U.S. Open Cup winners

== Bracket ==
Conference semifinals
E1	Columbus Crew	1	2
E4	Kansas City Wizards	1	0
Eastern Conference
E3	New England Revolution	0	0
E2	Chicago Fire	0	3
W1	Houston Dynamo	1	0
W4	New York Red Bulls	1	3
Western Conference
W3	Real Salt Lake	1	2
W2	Chivas USA	0	2

Conference finals
E1	Columbus Crew	2
E2	Chicago Fire	1
W4	New York Red Bulls	1
W3	Real Salt Lake	0

MLS Cup
E1	Columbus Crew	3
W4	New York Red Bulls	1

^{1} The New York Red Bulls earned the eighth and final playoff berth, despite finishing fifth in the Eastern Conference. They represented the fourth seed in the Western Conference playoff bracket, as only three teams in the Western Conference qualified for the playoffs.

== Conference semifinals ==
=== Eastern Conference ===
November 1
7:00 pm CDT

Kansas City Wizards	1–1	Columbus Crew
Arnaud 53'	Report	Lenhart 90+2'

Community America Ballpark, Kansas City, Kansas
Attendance: 10,385
Referee: Jorge Gonzalez
November 8
7:30 pm EST

Columbus Crew	2–0	Kansas City Wizards
Evans 7'; Rogers 57'	Report

Columbus Crew Stadium, Columbus, Ohio
Attendance: 11,153
Referee: Ricardo Salazar

Columbus Crew won 3–1 on aggregate.

October 30
7:30 pm EDT

New England Revolution	0–0	Chicago Fire
	Report

Gillette Stadium, Foxborough, Massachusetts
Attendance: 5,221
Referee: Alex Prus
November 6
7:30 pm CST

Chicago Fire	3–0	New England Revolution
Rolfe 45+2'; Conde 47'; Segares 74'	Report

Toyota Park, Bridgeview, Illinois
Attendance: 17,312
Referee: Jair Marrufo

Chicago Fire won 3–0 on aggregate.

=== Western Conference ===
November 1
4:00 pm EDT

New York Red Bulls	1–1	Houston Dynamo
Ángel 48'	Report	Kamara 85'

Giants Stadium, East Rutherford, New Jersey
Attendance: 11,578
Referee: Kevin Stott
November 9
2:00 pm CST

Houston Dynamo	0–3	New York Red Bulls
	Report	Richards 25'; Ángel 36' (pen.); Wolyniec 81'

Robertson Stadium, Houston, Texas
Attendance: 30,053
Referee: Baldomero Toledo

New York Red Bulls won 4–1 on aggregate.

November 1
4:00 pm MDT

Real Salt Lake	1–0	Chivas USA
Movsisyan 90'	Report

Rio Tinto Stadium, Sandy, Utah
Attendance: 14,719
Referee: Ricardo Salazar
November 8
7:30 pm PST

Chivas USA	2–2	Real Salt Lake
Kljestan 30' (pen.); Braun 83'	Report	Kovalenko 39'; Morales 77'

Home Depot Center, Carson, California
Attendance: 19,256
Referee: Michael Kennedy

Real Salt Lake won 3–2 on aggregate.

== Conference finals ==
=== Eastern Conference ===
November 13
7:30 pm EST

Columbus Crew	2–1	Chicago Fire
Marshall 49'; Gaven 55'	Report	McBride 29'

Columbus Crew Stadium, Columbus, Ohio
Attendance: 14,688
Referee: Terry Vaughn

=== Western Conference ===
November 15
7:30 pm MST

Real Salt Lake	0–1	New York Red Bulls
	Report	Van den Bergh 28'

Rio Tinto Stadium, Sandy, Utah
Attendance: 20,008
Referee: Jair Marrufo

== MLS Cup 2008 ==
November 23, 2008
12:30 pm PST

Columbus Crew	3–1	New York Red Bulls
Moreno 31'; Marshall 53'; Hejduk 82'	Report	Wolyniec 51'

Home Depot Center, Carson, California
Attendance: 27,000
Referee: Baldomero Toledo

== See also ==
- MLS Cup playoffs
- 2008 Major League Soccer season
