= Siniša Ubiparipović =

Bosnian-American footballer (born 1983)

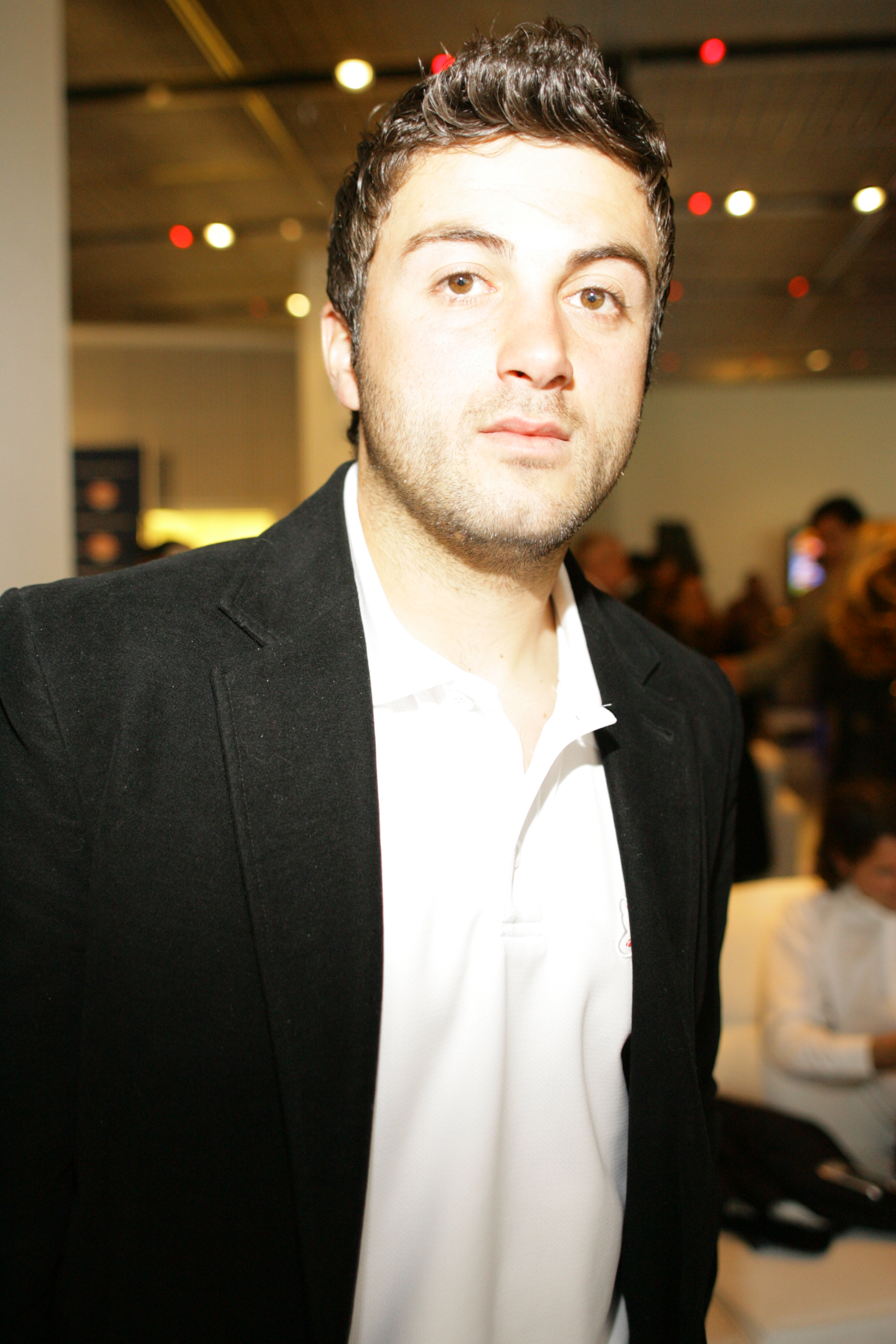
- Ubiparipović in 2008

Personal information
- Full name: Siniša Ubiparipović
- Date of birth: 25 August 1983 (age 43)
- Place of birth: Zenica, SR Bosnia and Herzegovina, SFR Yugoslavia
- Height: 5 ft 10 in (1.78 m)
- Position: Midfielder

Youth career
- Čelik Zenica
- 1993–1999: Modriča Maxima

College career
Years	Team	Apps	(Gls)
2002	UIC	20	(8)
2003–2006	Akron	61	(26)

Senior career*
Years	Team	Apps	(Gls)
2005	Cleveland Internationals	2	(0)
2006	Chicago Fire Premier	12	(3)
2007–2010	New York Red Bulls	69	(2)
2007	→ Minnesota Thunder (loan)	1	(1)
2011	Montreal Impact	10	(3)
2012–2013	Montreal Impact	13	(2)
2013	→ Minnesota United (loan)	7	(0)
2014–2015	Ottawa Fury	48	(9)
2016–2017	Indy Eleven	34	(1)
Total		196	(21)

Managerial career
- 2019–: Cleveland State Vikings
- * Club domestic league appearances and goals

Siniša Ubiparipović (Serbian Cyrillic: Синиша Убипариповић; born 25 August 1983) is a Bosnian-American former professional soccer player.

== Early life ==
Ubiparipović was born in the town of Zenica, at the time part of SR Bosnia and Herzegovina, SFR Yugoslavia, to an ethnic Serb family. Prior to the outbreak of the Bosnian War in 1992, the Ubiparipović family moved to Belgrade, the capital of Serbia, to escape the conflict, eventually coming to the United States in 1999.

His first contact with organized soccer was in the youth ranks of Čelik Zenica as a small child.

== Career ==
=== College ===
Ubiparipović began his college soccer career at the University of Illinois at Chicago in 2002, before transferring to the University of Akron, where he played from 2004 to 2006. At Akron, he was named an NSCAA All-American his last two years, and was the 2006 Mid-American Conference Player of the Year. During his college years Ubiparipović also played in the USL Premier Development League for both Cleveland Internationals and Chicago Fire Premier. While with the Chicago Fire Premier he was named to the Premier Development League's All-Central Conference team.

=== Professional ===
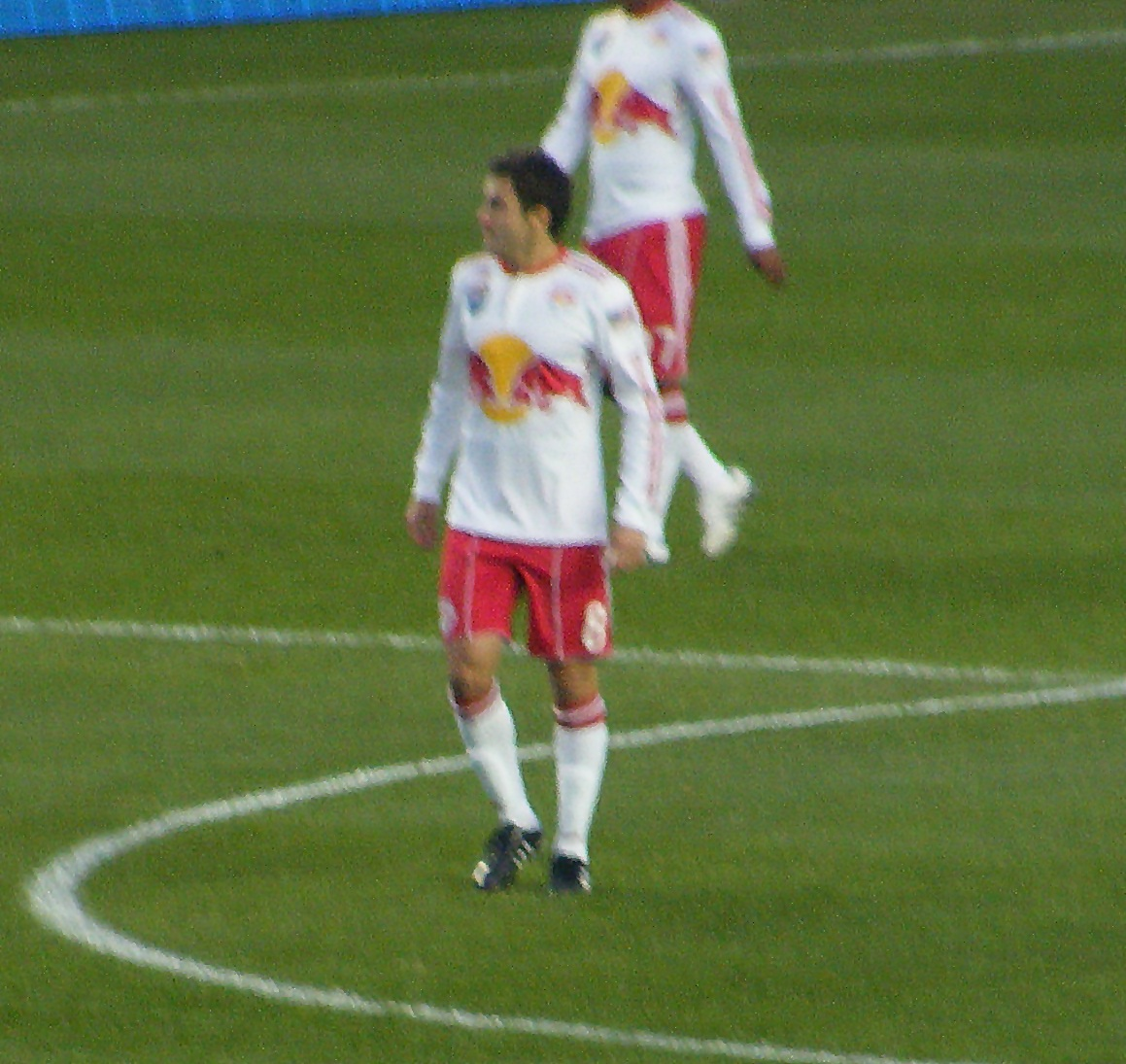
Ubiparipović playing for New York Red Bulls

Ubiparipović was drafted in the third round (33rd overall) of the 2007 MLS SuperDraft by New York Red Bulls. During his initial campaign with New York he appeared in 12 regular season matches and both of the club's playoff matches. He was also loaned out for one match during the 2007 season to Minnesota Thunder of the USL First Division, tallying one goal in a 4–2 loss to Rochester Rhinos.

During the 2008 season Ubiparipović appeared in 16 regular season matches and scored his first league goal. On 10 August 2008, Ubiparipović scored the fourth goal in New York's 4–1 victory over league rival D.C. United. During the 2008 MLS Cup Playoffs, he started all of the team's 4 playoff games helping lead the club to the 2008 MLS Cup final. In the 2009 season Siniša made a career-high 23 appearances for Red Bulls. On 20 March 2010, Ubiparipović started at left wing for Red Bulls in a 3–1 victory against Santos FC, which was the first match played at the new Red Bull Arena. On 12 May 2010 Ubiparipović scored his second goal for New York Red Bulls in a 3–0 victory over New England Revolution in a 2010 Lamar Hunt U.S. Open Cup qualification match.

His contract expired with New York Red Bulls after the 2010 season and he became a free agent. On 2 August 2011 Ubiparipović signed with Montreal Impact of the North American Soccer League. In 10 games with Montreal, Ubiparipović registered three goals and four assists, and was recognized as the club's newcomer of the year. On 1 November 2011, it was announced that Ubiparipović re-signed to continue with the Impact in 2012, the team's first year in Major League Soccer.

On 6 February 2014, Ubiparipović signed with Ottawa Fury FC of the NASL. He was a key player in helping Ottawa to the 2015 NASL fall season title as he scored 5 goals and recorded 8 assists in 26 matches. He later signed with Indy Eleven on 15 December 2015.

On 20 September 2017, Ubiparipović announced that he would retire from football at the end of the 2017 season.

== Personal ==
Siniša's brother Slaviša Ubiparipović played for Cleveland Internationals in the USL Premier Development League in 2008 and currently plays for the San Diego Sockers in the MASL.

== Career statistics ==
=== Club ===
As of match played 29 October 2017

Appearances and goals by club, season and competition
Club	Season	League			National Cup		Continental		Other		Total	
Club	Season	Division	Apps	Goals	Apps	Goals	Apps	Goals	Apps	Goals	Apps	Goals
New York Red Bulls	2007	MLS	12	0	1	0	–		2	0	14	0
New York Red Bulls	2008	MLS	16	0	1	0	–		4	0	20	0
New York Red Bulls	2009	MLS	23	1	2	0	2	0	–		23	1
New York Red Bulls	2010	MLS	18	1	3	1	–		–		18	1
New York Red Bulls	Total		69	2	7	1	2	0	6	0	84	3
Montreal Impact	2011	NASL	10	3	0	0	–		–		10	3
Montreal Impact	2012	MLS	12	2	2	0	–		–		14	2
Montreal Impact	2013	MLS	1	0	1	0	0	0	0	0	2	0
Montreal Impact	Total		13	2	3	0	0	0	0	0	16	2
Minnesota United (loan)	2013	NASL	7	0	0	0	–		–		7	0
Ottawa Fury	2014	NASL	24	4	1	0	-		-		25	4
Ottawa Fury	2015	NASL	24	5	2	0	-		2	0	28	5
Ottawa Fury	Total		48	9	3	0	-	-	2	0	53	9
Indy Eleven	2016	NASL	14	0	1	0	-		2	1	17	1
Indy Eleven	2017	NASL	20	0	0	0	-		-		20	0
Indy Eleven	Total		34	0	1	0	-	-	2	1	37	1
Career total			182	16	14	1	2	0	10	1	208	18

== Honors ==
=== New York Red Bulls ===
- Major League Soccer Western Conference Championship (1): 2008

=== Montreal Impact ===
- Canadian Championship (1): 2013

=== Ottawa Fury ===
- NASL Fall Championship 2015

=== Indy Eleven ===
- NASL Spring Championship 2016
