= Juan Pablo Ángel =

Colombian footballer (born 1975)

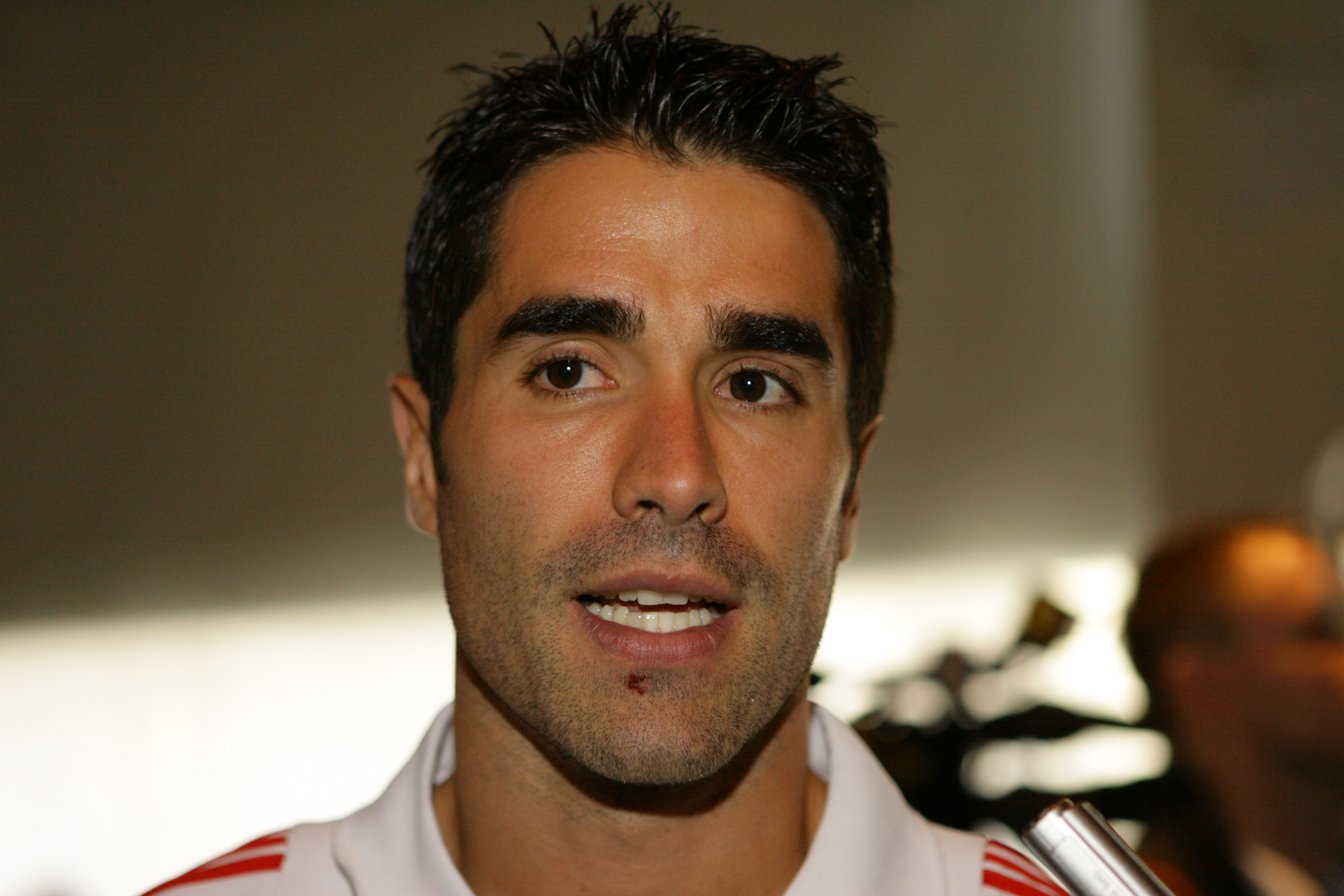
- Ángel with the New York Red Bulls in 2008

Personal information
- Full name: Juan Pablo Ángel Arango
- Date of birth: 24 October 1975 (age 51)
- Place of birth: Medellín, Colombia
- Height: 1.85 m (6 ft 1 in)
- Position: Forward

Youth career
- Atlético Nacional

Senior career*
Years	Team	Apps	(Gls)
1993–1997	Atlético Nacional	147	(45)
1997–2001	River Plate	96	(46)
2001–2007	Aston Villa	175	(44)
2007–2010	New York Red Bulls	102	(58)
2011	Los Angeles Galaxy	22	(3)
2011–2012	Chivas USA	28	(11)
2013–2014	Atlético Nacional	47	(17)
Total		617	(224)

International career
1996–2005	Colombia	33	(9)
- * Club domestic league appearances and goals

Juan Pablo Ángel Arango (born 24 October 1975) is a Colombian former professional footballer who played as a forward.

He began his career at Nacional, whom he helped to win the championship in 1994, and then moved to River Plate of Argentina, where he was the league's top scorer in 2000. The following year he moved to Europe, joining Aston Villa of the Premier League for a club record £9.5 million. In 2007, he moved to the United States, where he played for three clubs in Major League Soccer before returning to Atlético Nacional in 2013, where he ended his career a year later.

Ángel is the father of footballer Tomás Ángel, who currently plays as a forward for San Diego.

== Club career ==
=== Atlético Nacional and River Plate ===
Ángel started playing professional football at Atlético Nacional in his home city of Medellín. Ángel began to make a name for himself when he scored the winning goal against local rival Independiente Medellín to help Nacional capture the 1994 Colombian title. During his time with his hometown club Ángel would appear in 147 league matches scoring 45 goals.

Ángel was sold to River Plate in Argentina in January 1998 as a replacement of the departed Hernán Crespo. River Plate spectators would often adorn angel wings to show their appreciation. During his time with the club, Ángel managed 62 goals in 132 games, including 16 goals in 25 Copa Libertadores matches.

=== Aston Villa ===
The 25-year-old signed for Premier League side Aston Villa on 12 January 2001, becoming the club's record signing at £9.5 million. Angel made his debut away to Manchester United in a 2–0 loss on 20 January 2001. In his time at Villa, he was reportedly Villa's highest earner. After an indifferent start to his Aston Villa career, and family difficulties, Ángel settled down and started to reproduce the form that had persuaded chairman Doug Ellis to spend the large transfer fee. He quickly became a fans favourite and is the 3rd most recent Villa player to have scored more than 20 goals in one season (behind Christian Benteke in the 2012–13 season and Tammy Abraham in the 2018–19 season), finishing as the club's top scorer in the 2003–04 season with 16 goals in the FA Premier League, (23 goals including cup competitions) but could not maintain that form as Villa struggled and he only managed seven goals in 2004–05. That season he also missed two penalties in one game against Fulham. During his time with the club, Ángel managed 62 goals in 205 games across all competitions. Only two players have scored more goals for Villa in the Premier League era, those being Dwight Yorke (97 goals in 288 games) and Gabriel Agbonlahor (74 goals in 284 games).

=== New York Red Bulls ===
On 17 April 2007, the New York Red Bulls announced the signing of Ángel as their second designated player, pending the approval of his work visa. After his visa was approved, Ángel made his Red Bull debut 8 May 2007 in a US Open Cup qualifying match. Ángel came on as a substitute and scored from a free kick in extra time during the Red Bulls' 3–1 loss to Los Angeles Galaxy.

Ángel also recorded an assist and played an important role in a third goal to round off a performance that earned him that week's MLS Player of the Week award. His form showed no signs of letting up in the following game, as he weighed in with two goals and another assist as the Red Bulls overcame Chicago Fire to win 3–0, taking them to joint top of the Eastern Conference.

Ángel was voted MLS Player of the Month for May 2007. He became the first Red Bull player to score in six straight games.

On 18 August 2007, Ángel added two more goals to his tally. His team defeated Los Angeles Galaxy 5–4. Ángel scored the first goal early on from a free kick before striking a late winner to seal the game for the Red Bulls. Ángel also scored the first goal of the 2007 MLS All-Star Game on 19 July 2007 against Celtic, and later was named MVP of the Match for his performance. On 29 September 2007, Ángel scored a penalty to tie the Red Bulls' game against Real Salt Lake and in doing so scored his 17th goal of the season in all competitions, setting a new franchise record. Ángel concluded his initial campaign in New York scoring 19 goals and 5 assists in 24 league matches (20 goals in 27 matches in all official competitions). His regular season goal total was one short of Luciano Emilio who led the league with 20 but who had also played more games.

Ángel had a slow start to the 2008 season due to an arthritic nerve-related injury in his lower back that caused him to have pain in his hamstring but he finally scored his first of the season in his fourth appearance – a 2–1 winner against LA Galaxy on 10 May. On 5 June he fought through a still painful injury to score the only goal in New York's home win against Chivas USA. However, in doing so he also picked up another slight hamstring strain and after the final whistle he was seen limping off the pitch. As a result of this injury Ángel missed the Red Bulls' next 4 league games. Even through this injury-plagued season, his three goals were enough for coach Steve Nicol to name him to the 2008 MLS All-Star Game vs West Ham United in which he fed the pass that earned the game winning penalty kick and also scored a goal that was disallowed due to a controversial offside. Ángel concluded his second season in New York scoring 14 goals in 23 league matches (16 goals in 28 matches in official competitions).

Ángel's third season in New York was a major disappointment as the club had one of the worst seasons in club history. The club was quickly eliminated from play-off contention and failed to qualify to the group stages of the CONCACAF Champions League. However, Ángel still had his moments during the campaign as he became the club's all-time leading goal scorer. On 26 September 2009, he scored the equalising goal in a 1–1 draw at Chivas USA, that goal being the 46th of his career with New York and breaking Clint Mathis former record of 45. Ángel ended his season leading the club in scoring for the third straight year scoring 12 goals in 25 league matches.

Juan Pablo Ángel's 2010 season was greatly improved. He started off slow but slowly progressed during the first half of the season to claim a total of 11 goals from 19 games. He slumped in the second half of the season but concluded the season as the club's top scorer with 13 goals in 30 regular season appearances. On 2 June 2010, Angel scored the game-winning goal in a match against the Houston Dynamo, snapping a four-game losing streak. On 21 October 2010, Ángel assisted Dane Richards on the opening goal in a 2–0 victory over New England Revolution which helped New York clinch its second ever regular season Eastern Conference title.

On 11 November 2010, it was announced that he would not be returning to the Red Bulls for the 2011 Major League Soccer season. Ángel trails only Bradley Wright-Phillips in the club's all-time leading goal record, with 62.

==== Play-offs ====
On 26 October 2007, Ángel told the New York Daily News, "It's very American, in every sport the playoff system ... I think there should be more credit to the guys who do well in the regular season. It's interesting. It's a little bit unfair. I'm trying to understand it. I might answer you in a different way in a couple of weeks." A week later, Ángel and the Red Bulls were knocked out of contention for the 2007 MLS Cup by the New England Revolution on a 1–0 aggregate score as Ángel pleaded to his manager to be brought back on after coming off for treatment to a head injury received during the match which turned out to be a concussion.

The following season Ángel would help lead the Red Bulls to their first ever MLS Cup final. On the way they defeated Houston Dynamo 3–0 (4–1 aggregate) and Real Salt Lake 1–0, but ultimately lost the final to Columbus Crew 3–1. After a poor 2009 season the Red Bulls failed to qualify for the post season for the first time since Ángel's arrival.

The New York Red Bulls qualified the next season for the playoffs, with Ángel doing extremely well during the regular season. They ended up losing in the first round of the playoffs, losing 3–2 on aggregate, where Ángel scored a late goal to make the intense game 2–1 (2–2 aggregate) but Chris Wondolowski scored an even later goal to win it.

=== Los Angeles Galaxy ===
After the 2010 MLS season New York declined Ángel's contract option and Ángel elected to participate in the 2010 MLS Re-Entry Draft. On 15 December 2010 Ángel was selected by Los Angeles Galaxy in Stage 2 of the Re-Entry draft. On 19 January 2011, the club announced that they had signed Ángel to a multi-year contract which would make him the Galaxy's third designated player. He scored his first goal of his 2011 Galaxy campaign in a 4–1 loss against Real Salt Lake.

=== Chivas USA ===
On 17 August 2011, Ángel was traded to Chivas USA to make room for new Los Angeles designated player Robbie Keane. Ángel scored his first goal for 'the Goats' in his debut against the Colorado Rapids. Returning to form, he would go on to finish the 2011 season with seven goals in nine games.

Ángel remained with Chivas USA through the 2012 season. His contract expired after 2012 and he made himself eligible for the 2012 MLS Re-Entry Draft in December 2012. Ángel became a free agent after he went undrafted in both rounds.

=== Atlético Nacional ===
Ángel's career came full circle in January 2013 when he signed a one-year contract to play for and captain his first club, Atlético Nacional. He arrived as a reinforcement to try and solve the club's goalscoring troubles under coach Juan Carlos Osorio, who was also responsible for bringing Ángel to New York. As a sign of commitment to the team, his wage in Medellín was only 30 million pesos (US$15,600) per month compared to his former salary in the US which was 300 million pesos (US$156,000) a month.

On 2 February 2013, Ángel wore green again as a starter at the Estadio Atanasio Girardot where he scored a goal from the penalty spot in his team's 3–0 victory against Atlético Huila. His second debut for the club would prove an ominous sign as the striker's return led to a dominant spell for Nacional. Ángel finished as his team's top goalscorer in the 2013 Apertura campaign as he helped fire them to the league title – the first of three consecutive championships (later adding the 2013 Clausura and 2014 Apertura), becoming the first club to achieve this since the Colombian league switched to the Apertura/Clausura format in 2002.

In addition to helping 'Los Verdolagas' return to league success, Ángel also lifted the 2013 Copa Colombia and helped his side reach the final of the Copa Sudamericana in 2014. He would play in the second leg of Nacional's losing effort in the Sudamericana final against former club River Plate on 10 December 2014. Of the game, he said: “I am closing my career in a final with the two clubs I love the most. I am overjoyed because that will be the last image that stays with me from football. I have lots of conflicting feelings; it is a wonderful way to end my career, as good as it gets.” Three days later, he made the final appearance of his career, coming on in the 72nd minute of a 1–0 loss to Santa Fe.

== International career ==
Ángel was a full international for Colombia, and made 33 appearances from his debut in 1996, scoring 9 goals.

He was first called up to represent Colombia in 1995, and he debuted as a second-half substitute during a 2–1 friendly win against Honduras on 1 November 1996; Ángel also scored his first goal for Colombia during this match, which was the winning goal.

He would then continue to represent Colombia during qualification for the 1998, 2002, and 2006 editions of the FIFA World Cup, in which he scored eight goals.

His last appearance for Colombia came on 11 October 2005 during a 1–0 win against Paraguay during 2006 FIFA World Cup qualification.

== Career statistics ==
=== Club ===
Appearances and goals by club, season and competition
Club	Season	League			National cup (Note: Includes FA Cup, Open Cup.)		League cup (Note: Includes Football League Cup.)		Continental		Total	
Club	Season	Division	Apps	Goals	Apps	Goals	Apps	Goals	Apps	Goals	Apps	Goals
Atlético Nacional	1993	Primera A	3	1							3	1
Atlético Nacional	1994	Primera A	32	8							32	8
Atlético Nacional	1995	Primera A	22	0					4	4	26	4
Atlético Nacional	1996	Primera A										
Atlético Nacional	1997	Primera A										
Atlético Nacional	Total											
River Plate	1997–98	Argentine Primera División	12	2							12	2
River Plate	1998–99	Argentine Primera División	31	11							31	11
River Plate	1999–2000	Argentine Primera División	35	20							35	20
River Plate	2000–01	Argentine Primera División	18	13							18	13
River Plate	Total		96	46					36	16	132	62
Aston Villa	2000–01	Premier League	9	1	1	0	1	0	–		11	1
Aston Villa	2001–02	Premier League	29	12	1	0	0	0	4	4	34	16
Aston Villa	2002–03	Premier League	15	1	1	1	3	1	–		19	3
Aston Villa	2003–04	Premier League	33	16	1	0	5	7	–		39	23
Aston Villa	2004–05	Premier League	35	7	1	0	2	2	–		38	9
Aston Villa	2005–06	Premier League	31	3	3	0	3	0	–		37	3
Aston Villa	2006–07	Premier League	23	4	1	0	3	3	–		27	7
Aston Villa	Total		175	44	9	1	17	13	4	4	205	62
New York Red Bulls	2007	Major League Soccer	24	19	1	1	2	0	–		27	20
New York Red Bulls	2008	Major League Soccer	23	14	0	0	4	2	–		27	16
New York Red Bulls	2009	Major League Soccer	25	12	0	0	–		1	0	26	12
New York Red Bulls	2010	Major League Soccer	30	13	0	0	2	1	–		32	14
New York Red Bulls	Total		102	58	1	1	8	3	1	0	112	62
Los Angeles Galaxy	2011	Major League Soccer	22	3	0	0	–		–		22	3
Chivas USA	2011	Major League Soccer	9	7	–		–		–		9	7
Chivas USA	2012	Major League Soccer	19	4	4	1	–		–		23	5
Chivas USA	Total		28	11	4	1	0	0	0	0	32	12
Atlético Nacional	2013	Categoría Primera A	31	9	5	3	–		2	1	38	13
Atlético Nacional	2014	Categoría Primera A	16	8	4	1	–		5	0	25	9
Atlético Nacional	Total		47	17	9	4			7	1	63	22
Career total			617	224	23	7	25	16	52	25	717	272

=== International ===
Scores and results list Colombia's goal tally first, score column indicates score after each Ángel goal.

List of international goals scored by Juan Pablo Ángel
No.	Date	Venue	Opponent	Score	Result	Competition
1	1 November 1996	Shea Stadium, Flushing, United States	Honduras	2–1	2–1	Friendly
2	19 July 2000	Estadio Nacional, Lima, Peru	Peru	1–0	1–0	2002 FIFA World Cup qualification
3	27 March 2001	Estadio Nemesio Camacho, Bogotá, Colombia	Bolivia	1–0	2–0	2002 FIFA World Cup qualification
4	27 March 2001	Estadio Nemesio Camacho, Bogotá, Colombia	Bolivia	2–0	2–0	2002 FIFA World Cup qualification
5	7 November 2001	Estadio Nemesio Camacho, Bogotá, Colombia	Chile	2–1	3–1	2002 FIFA World Cup qualification
6	7 September 2003	Estadio Metropolitano Roberto Meléndez, Barranquilla, Colombia	Brazil	1–1	1–2	2006 FIFA World Cup qualification
7	19 November 2003	Estadio Metropolitano Roberto Meléndez, Barranquilla, Colombia	Argentina	1–1	1–1	2006 FIFA World Cup qualification
8	4 June 2005	Estadio Metropolitano Roberto Meléndez, Barranquilla, Colombia	Peru	3–0	5–0	2006 FIFA World Cup qualification
9	4 September 2005	Estadio Centenario, Montevideo, Uruguay	Uruguay	2–2	2–3	2006 FIFA World Cup qualification

== Honours ==
Atlético Nacional

- Categoría Primera A: 1994, 2013-I, 2013-II, 2014-I
- Copa Interamericana: 1995
- Copa Colombia: 2013

Club Atlético River Plate

- Primera División Argentina: Apertura 1999, Clausura 2000

Aston Villa

- UEFA Intertoto Cup: 2001

New York Red Bulls

- MLS Western Conference (Playoffs): 2008

Individual

- MLS Player of the Month: May 2007, June 2007, October 2008
- MLS Best XI: 2007

Sporting positions
Preceded by Claudio Reyna	New York Red Bulls captain 2009–2011	Succeeded by Thierry Henry
