= Des McAleenan =

Irish footballer (1967–2021)

Personal information
- Full name: Desmond McAleenan
- Date of birth: 12 June 1967
- Place of birth: Dublin, Ireland
- Date of death: 26 February 2021 (aged 53)
- Place of death: Dublin, Ireland
- Position: Goalkeeper

Youth career
- Stella Maris

College career
Years	Team	Apps	(Gls)
1988–1992	Central Connecticut State University		

Senior career*
Years	Team	Apps	(Gls)
1992–1995	Connecticut Wolves		
1996	Albany Alleycats		

Managerial career
- 2002–2011: New York Red Bulls (goalkeeping coach)
- 2011–2017: Al-Hilal FC (goalkeeping coach)
- 2016: United States (youth goalkeeping coach)
- 2019–2020: Colombia (goalkeeping coach)
- * Club domestic league appearances and goals

Desmond McAleenan (12 June 1967 – 26 February 2021) was an Irish-American soccer player and coach who played as a goalkeeper.

== Career ==
Born in Dublin, Ireland, McAleenan grew up in Artane, a suburb of the city. He played schoolboy football with Stella Maris.

He moved to the United States in 1988 and played for Central Connecticut State University for four years. He played professionally in the USL Championship for Connecticut Wolves from 1992 to 1995 and for Albany Alleycats.

He was with the MetroStars franchise as goalkeeping coach for New York Red Bulls in Major League Soccer from 2002 until his dismissal on 28 February 2011. He coached goalkeepers including Tim Howard and US full internationals Tony Meola and Jonny Walker.

He served as goalkeeping coach for the Colombia national team under manager Carlos Queiroz.

He died on 26 February 2021, aged 53, having battled with depression for years.
