= Baldomero Toledo =

American soccer referee from California (born 1970)

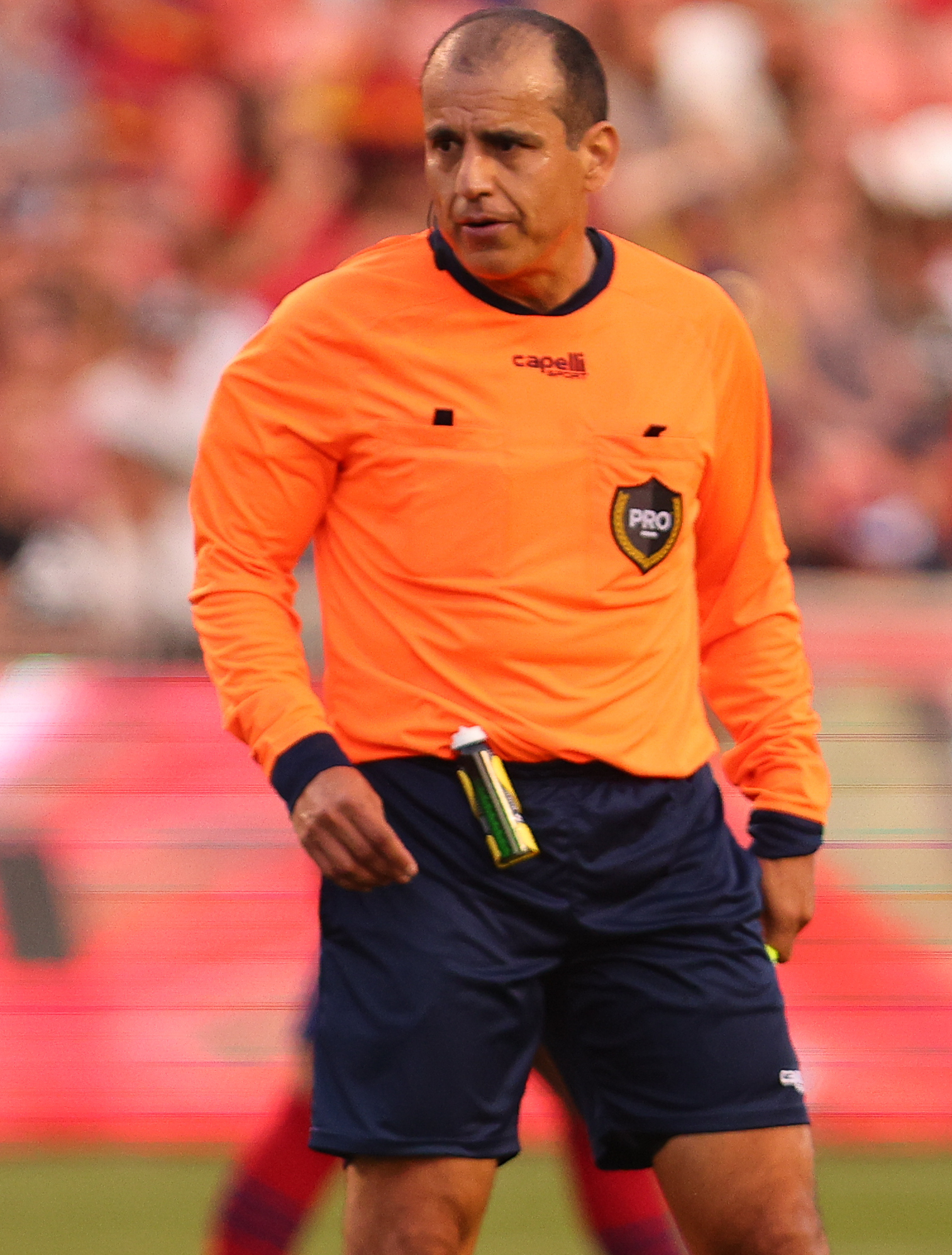
- Toledo during an MLS match in 2021
- Born: February 6, 1970 (age 56); Mexico
- Other occupation: Baker

Domestic
Years	League	Role
2004–2021	MLS	Referee
2011–2017	NASL	Referee

International
Years	League	Role
2007–2017	FIFA listed	Referee

Baldomero Toledo (born February 6, 1970) is a Mexican-born American soccer referee. He was a Major League Soccer referee from 2004-2021, and a FIFA referee from 2007 to 2017.

== Career ==
Toledo was born in Mexico, where he started refereeing at the age of 15 in local school leagues. Later, he moved to Southern California and continued working as a referee in local leagues until he made it to the U.S. Soccer academies.

He was the referee for the 2008 MLS Cup, the 2010 MLS Cup, and the 2016 Lamar Hunt U.S. Open Cup Final.

US Soccer hired Toledo as a full-time referee in 2007. Toledo was selected to referee at the 2011 CONCACAF Gold Cup.

In 2017, Toledo was involved in a controversial situation when he refereed a friendly match between Mexico and Ghana, that Mexico won 1–0. Ghana's manager at the time, James Kwesi Appiah, complained that Toledo was assigned to the game: "I was really, really shocked that in a game like this they would allow a Mexican to be the center referee when we were playing Mexico", despite the fact that Toledo had worked in the United States for decades.

Toledo retired following the 2021 MLS season after refereeing over 300 regular season games.
