= John Wolyniec =

American soccer player and manager (born 1977)

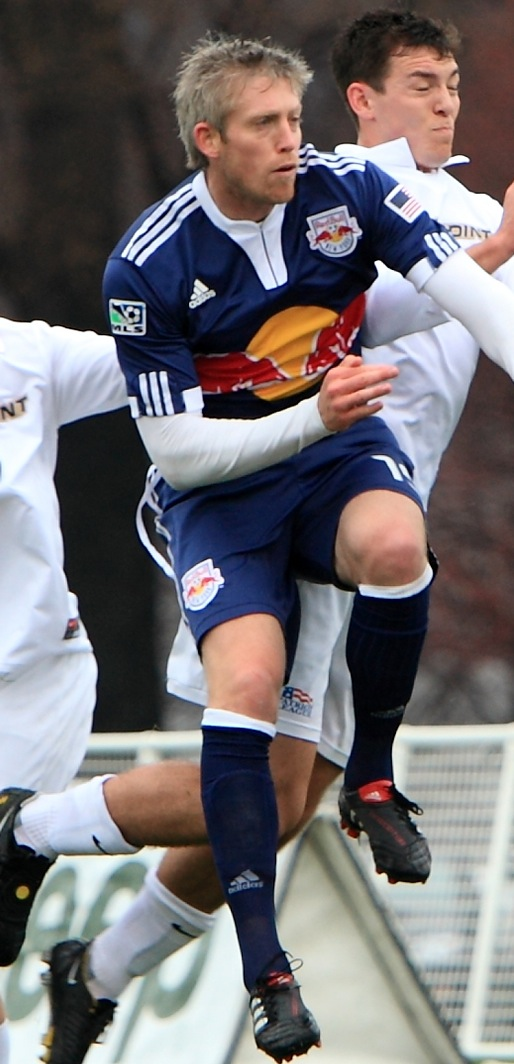
- John Wolyniec with New York Red Bulls in 2010

Personal information
- Full name: John Wolyniec
- Date of birth: January 24, 1977 (age 49)
- Place of birth: Staten Island, New York, United States
- Height: 6 ft 1 in (1.85 m)
- Position: Forward

College career
Years	Team	Apps	(Gls)
1995–1998	Fordham Rams		

Senior career*
Years	Team	Apps	(Gls)
1998	Brooklyn Knights	7	(3)
1999	Long Island Rough Riders	27	(15)
1999	MetroStars	4	(1)
2000–2001	Chicago Fire	19	(2)
2000	→ MLS Pro-40 (loan)	3	(0)
2000	→ Milwaukee Rampage (loan)	4	(3)
2001	New England Revolution	1	(0)
2001	Rochester Raging Rhinos	15	(1)
2002	Milwaukee Rampage	26	(10)
2002	Chicago Fire	2	(1)
2003–2005	MetroStars	63	(17)
2005–2006	Columbus Crew	18	(3)
2006	Los Angeles Galaxy	10	(1)
2006–2010	New York Red Bulls	75	(8)
Total		267	(62)

International career
2004	United States	2	(0)

Managerial career
- 2015–2021: New York Red Bulls II
- 2022–: San Jose Earthquakes (technical director)
- * Club domestic league appearances and goals

John Wolyniec (born January 24, 1977) is an American professional soccer coach, executive, and former player. He is currently the technical director of the San Jose Earthquakes.

During his playing days, Wolyniec played for Major League Soccer club New York Red Bulls three separate times: In 1999 as the MetroStars, from 2003 to 2005 as the MetroStars, and from 2006 until he retired in 2010. He also played for MLS clubs Chicago Fire, Columbus Crew, and Los Angeles Galaxy. He also played for USL A-League clubs Rochester Raging Rhinos and the Milwaukee Rampage, winning titles with them in 2001 and 2002 respectively. Wolyniec also represented the United States national team in 2004, earning two caps.

After retiring as a player, Wolyniec was appointed head coach of New York Red Bulls II, the reserve side for the New York Red Bulls. In his second season as head coach, Wolyniec guided Red Bulls II to both the regular season and championship titles.

== Youth and amateur ==
Wolyniec is native of Annadale, Staten Island, New York City and attended Monsignor Farrell High School before playing four years of college soccer at Fordham University, where he led the nation in goals in 1998. He is of Polish descent.

== Playing career ==
=== Professional ===
Wolyniec was drafted by the MetroStars as the seventh–pick overall in the 1999 MLS College Draft. However, despite being a high pick, he was cut before playing any games. Wolyniec then signed with the Long Island Rough Riders of the A-League and led the team in goals. In the midst of the worst season in league history, the MetroStars called him up for a late-season stretch and he promptly scored in his first game with the team.

In 2000, the Chicago Fire re-drafted Wolyniec with the 44th overall pick of the 2000 MLS SuperDraft. That season, the Fire sent him on loan with the MLS Project-40 and the Milwaukee Rampage where he scored three goals in four games. Back with the Fire, he scored just one goal all year, and, after scoring one early in 2001, was traded to the New England Revolution for Eric Wynalda. Wolyniec was cut after he playing one game. He spent the next two years in the A-League, with the Rochester Raging Rhinos in 2001 and with the Milwaukee Rampage in 2002. He was named league MVP during his time with the Rampage.

In 2003, then MetroStars head coach Bob Bradley re-acquired Wolyniec in the MLS supplemental draft. Wolyniec came into his own during his second stint with the team, scoring a number of key goals, including two overtime game-winners and a late winner in the U.S. Open Cup semifinals against D.C. United. He finished the year with five MLS goals (seven in all competitions).

On May 26, 2004, Wolyniec scored two goals and assisted on another in a 3–1 victory over Boavista F.C. of the Portuguese Liga. Even as the team signed a trio of foreign strikers in 2004, he kept his starting place, scored ten goals to tie for the team lead, and began to mature into a team leader. But after scoring two goals in eight games in 2005, he was traded to the Columbus Crew in exchange for prolific scorer Ante Razov.

After scoring three goals for the Crew, Wolyniec was dealt in May 2006 to Los Angeles Galaxy in a four-player deal. In August, he was traded again, joining New York Red Bulls for his third stint with the club formerly known as MetroStars.

The 2007 and 2008 seasons saw Wolyniec primarily as a reserve player for New York, managing to score 3 goals in 21 appearances in 2007 and being held scoreless in 19 regular season appearances in 2008. With the Red Bulls barely qualifying for the 2008 MLS Playoffs, Coach Juan Carlos Osorio surprisingly inserted Wolyniec into the starting lineup for the club's first leg match against the defending champion Houston Dynamo, Wolyniec would assist on Juan Pablo Angel's goal in a match that ended 1-1. With New York needing a victory to advance out of the first round for the second time in team history, Osorio repeated the same lineup that drew 1-1. Wolyniec was again a key figure scoring the third goal in a 3–0 rout of Houston in Robertson Stadium. Wolyniec continued his fine play in the Western Conference Final, helping set up the Red Bulls' lone goal in the 1–0 victory over Real Salt Lake, and thus advancing to the club's first ever MLS Cup Final. In the MLS Cup Final, Wolyniec scored the Red Bulls lone goal in a 3–1 loss to the Columbus Crew. During the 2009 season Wolyniec was the only New York player to score in all competitions that the club participated in (League, US Open Cup, CONCACAF Champions League). On May 12, 2010, Wolyniec had his first multi-goal game for the New York Red Bulls scoring two goals in a 3–0 victory over New England Revolution in a 2010 Lamar Hunt U.S. Open Cup qualification match. On May 26, 2010, Wolyniec recorded another two goals in a 3–0 victory over Colorado Rapids leading the club to the Round of 16 of the 2010 Lamar Hunt U.S. Open Cup.

Wolyniec was waived by New York on July 30, 2010, to make room on the roster for new signing Thierry Henry. On September 9, 2010, Wolyniec announced his retirement from professional soccer in order to take a position in the Red Bull Academy. Wolyniec ended his Red Bulls career beloved by supporters and ranks among the all-time club leaders in games played. On February 15, 2013, was promoted to Reserve Team Coach/Player Development Coordinator by the club.

=== International ===
Wolyniec earned a call-up to the U.S. national team in 2004, getting his first cap against Denmark on January 18, 2004. He earned a total of two caps.

== Coaching career ==
=== New York Red Bulls II ===
Wolyniec was appointed as the inaugural head coach of New York Red Bulls II on March 2, 2015. His first match as head coach was against his former club as a player, Rochester Rhinos, on March 28. The match ended as a 0–0 draw. In 2016, in his second season as head coach, Wolyniec lead New York Red Bulls II to both the regular season and championship titles. Wolyniec stepped down as Red Bulls II coach on December 10, 2021.

Team	Record							
Team	G	W	D	L	PTS	GF	GA	GD
New York Red Bulls II	206	88	43	75	307	381	340	+41

== Statistics ==
Club performance			League		Cup		League Cup		Continental		Total	
Season	Club	League	Apps	Goals	Apps	Goals	Apps	Goals	Apps	Goals	Apps	Goals
USA			League		Open Cup		League Cup		North America		Total	
1999	MetroStars	Major League Soccer	4	1	-	-	-	-	-	-	4	1
1999	Long Island Rough Riders	USISL A-League	27	15	-	-	1	1	-	-	28	16
2000	MLS Pro-40(loan)	USL A-League	3	0	-	-	-	-	-	-	3	0
2000	Milwaukee Rampage(loan)	USL A-League	4	3	-	-	-	-	-	-	4	3
2000	Chicago Fire	Major League Soccer	15	1	2	0	2	0	-	-	19	1
2001	Chicago Fire	Major League Soccer	4	1	-	-	-	-	-	-	4	1
2001	New England Revolution	Major League Soccer	1	0	-	-	-	-	-	-	1	0
2001	Rochester Rhinos	USL A-League	15	1	1	0	-	-	-	-	16	1
2002	Chicago Fire	Major League Soccer	2	1	-	-	-	-	-	-	2	1
2002	Milwaukee Rampage	USL A-League	26	10	3	1	5	2	-	-	34	13
2003	MetroStars	Major League Soccer	25	5	5	2	1	0	-	-	31	7
2004	MetroStars	Major League Soccer	30	10	1	0	2	0	-	-	33	10
2005	MetroStars	Major League Soccer	8	2	-	-	-	-	-	-	8	2
2005	Columbus Crew	Major League Soccer	17	3	1	0	-	-	-	-	18	3
2006	Columbus Crew	Major League Soccer	1	0	-	-	-	-	-	-	1	0
2006	Los Angeles Galaxy	Major League Soccer	10	1	-	-	-	-	-	-	10	1
2006	New York Red Bulls	Major League Soccer	11	3	-	-	2	0	-	-	13	3
2007	New York Red Bulls	Major League Soccer	21	3	1	0	1	0	-	-	23	3
2008	New York Red Bulls	Major League Soccer	19	0	1	0	4	2	-	-	24	2
2009	New York Red Bulls	Major League Soccer	20	2	2	1	-	-	1	1	23	4
2010	New York Red Bulls	Major League Soccer	4	0	4	4					8	4
Total	USA		267	62	21	8	18	5	1	1	307	76

== Honors ==
=== Player ===
Chicago Fire

- U.S. Open Cup: 2000

Rochester Raging Rhinos

- USL A-League: 2001

Milwaukee Rampage

- USL A-League: 2002

=== Head coach ===
New York Red Bulls II

- USL Championship: 2016

Individual

- 2016 USL Coach of the Year
