= Danny Cepero =

American soccer player

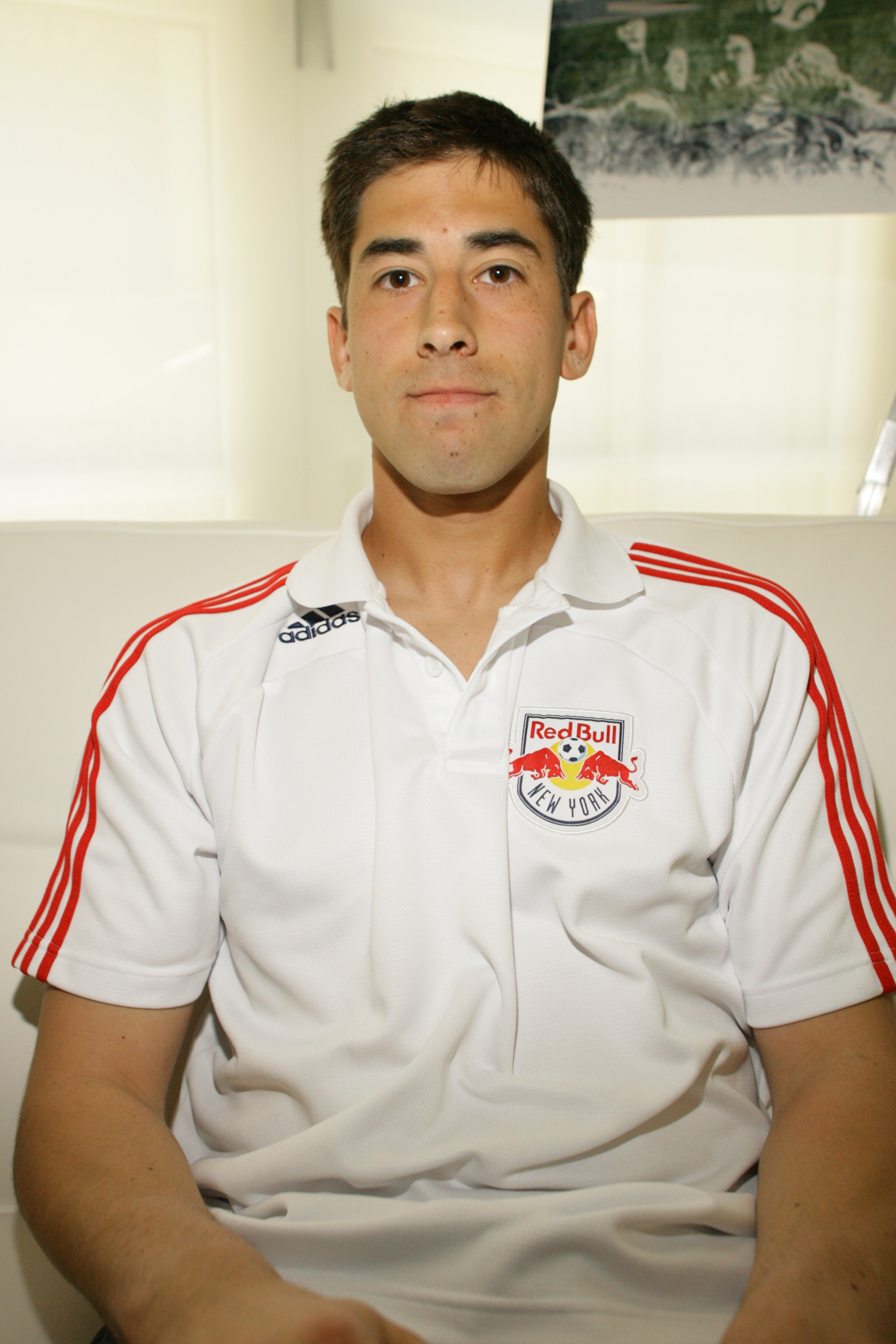

Personal information
- Full name: Daniel Cepero
- Date of birth: April 22, 1985 (age 41)
- Place of birth: Baldwin, New York, United States
- Height: 6 ft 2 in (1.88 m)
- Position: Goalkeeper

College career
Years	Team	Apps	(Gls)
2003–2006	Penn Quakers		

Senior career*
Years	Team	Apps	(Gls)
2007–2009	New York Red Bulls	15	(1)
2008	→ Harrisburg City Islanders (loan)	18	(0)
2010	Harrisburg City Islanders	15	(0)
2010	→ Philadelphia Union (loan)	0	(0)
2010	→ New York Red Bulls (loan)	0	(0)
Total		48	(1)

Managerial career
- 2011–2013: Florida Gulf Coast Eagles (assistant)
- 2013–2017: Louisville Cardinals (assistant)
- 2018–2022: New York City FC Academy (director of goalkeeping)
- 2022–2024: New York City FC II (goalkeeping)
- 2025–: Nashville SC (goalkeeping)
- * Club domestic league appearances and goals

Danny Cepero (born April 22, 1985, in Baldwin, New York) is an American former professional soccer player who played as a goalkeeper. He is currently the goalkeeping coach for Major League Soccer club Nashville SC.

== Playing career ==
=== College ===
Cepero played four years of college soccer at the University of Pennsylvania, where he captained the squad, set Penn's all-time career record for shutouts, and was named to the All-Ivy team in his senior year.

=== Professional ===
Cepero was drafted by the New York Red Bulls in the fourth round of the 2007 MLS Supplemental Draft and spent the early part of 2007 balancing his remaining academic duties with his attempts to make the team roster. On March 26, 2007, the team announced that it had signed Cepero to a developmental contract. Cepero spent some time in the post-season of 2007 training with Dutch side PSV Eindhoven, where he impressed coaches.

Cepero was loaned out to the Harrisburg City Islanders of the USL Second Division in 2008, and while with the City Islanders Cepero established himself as one of the top keepers in USL-2. Following his successful loan stint he was recalled by the Red Bulls.

Cepero made his Red Bulls debut on October 18, 2008, against the Columbus Crew, because of first choice goalkeeper Jon Conway's 10-game suspension for using illegal substances. In the 83rd minute of the game Cepero scored a goal from a free kick deep inside his own half to become the first goalkeeper in MLS history to score a goal from open play.

Cepero was waived by New York on February 12, 2010. He later signed with Harrisburg City Islanders.

It was reported on March 14, 2011, that Cepero retired as a professional soccer player.

== Coaching career ==
After retirement, Cepero joined Florida Gulf Coast University as an assistant men's soccer coach. In February 2013, he joined University of Louisville also as an assistant coach working mostly with goalkeepers. Cepero is currently the Director of Goalkeeping for the New York City FC Academy.

Cepero joined the staff of Nashville SC in January 2025.

== Honors ==
=== New York Red Bulls ===
- Major League Soccer Western Conference Championship (1): 2008
