= Chad Marshall =

American soccer player (born 1984)

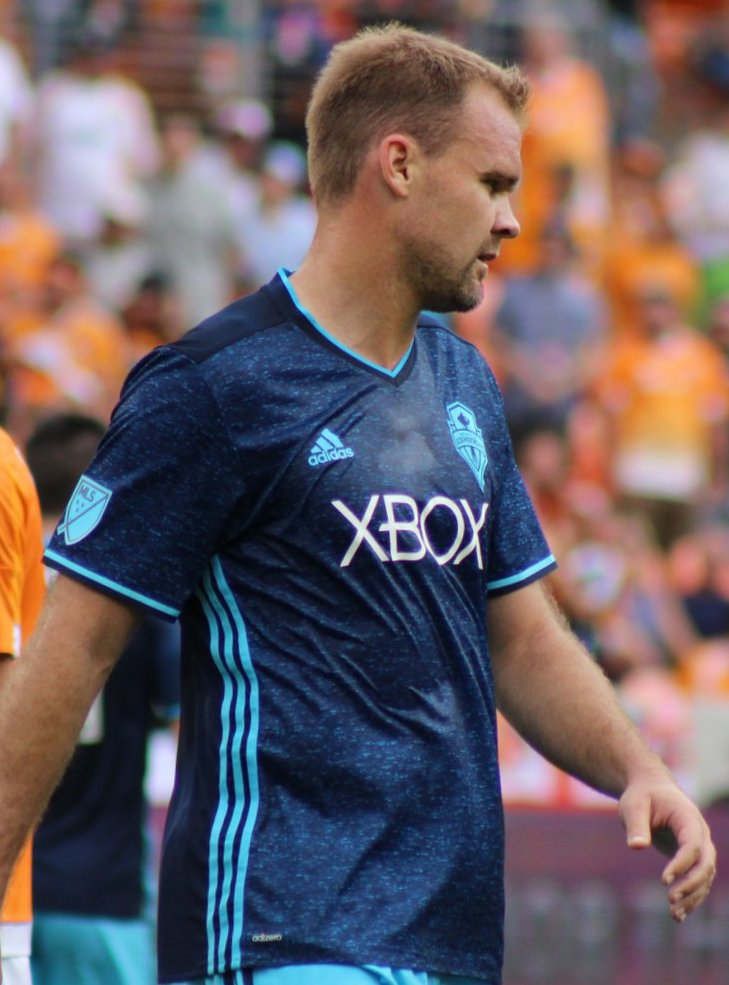
- Marshall with the Seattle Sounders in 2016

Personal information
- Date of birth: August 22, 1984 (age 42)
- Place of birth: Riverside, California, United States
- Height: 6 ft 4 in (1.93 m)
- Position: Centre-back

Youth career
- 1999–2002: Irvine Strikers

College career
Years	Team	Apps	(Gls)
2002–2003	Stanford Cardinal	40	(3)

Senior career*
Years	Team	Apps	(Gls)
2004–2013	Columbus Crew	253	(16)
2014–2019	Seattle Sounders FC	156	(10)
Total		409	(26)

International career^{‡}
2000–2001	United States U17	12	(4)
2002–2003	United States U20	30	(0)
2004	United States U23	4	(0)
2005–2017	United States	12	(1)
Medal record
Representing United States
Runner-up	CONCACAF Gold Cup	2009
Men's Soccer
- * Club domestic league appearances and goals as of May 22, 2019 ‡ National team caps and goals as of February 3, 2017

Chad Marshall (born August 22, 1984) is an American former professional soccer player. During his 16-year career, he played for Columbus Crew and Seattle Sounders FC in Major League Soccer. Regarded as one of the league's greatest players of all time, he was a three-time MLS Defender of the Year Award winner, two-time MLS Cup winner, four-time Supporters' Shield winner, a U.S. Open Cup winner, and was selected to four All-Star teams.

== Youth and college career ==
Marshall attended Rubidoux High School in Jurupa Valley, California where he was an NCSAA All-American, Parade All-America selection his junior and senior years, and Parade's Best Defender in his senior year. Coming out of high school he was rated as the top college soccer recruit in the country by Soccer America. In addition to his soccer exploits, Chad was also an avid equestrian. He played club soccer for the prestigious club soccer team Irvine Strikers coached by the legendary club coach Don Ebert, helping lead the team to four state titles. He attended the IMG Soccer Academy in fall 2000 through spring 2001. Chad attended Stanford University for college, and as a freshman in 2002, He started 20 of 21 regular season games en route to earning Soccer America's Freshman of the Year and Second Team All-Pac-10 honors. He scored two game-winning overtime goals in the NCAA College Cup playoffs, securing 2-1 victories against Furman in the third round and Creighton in the semifinals, while being named to that year's College Cup All-Tournament team. After two seasons with the Cardinal, he decided to turn pro.

== Professional career ==
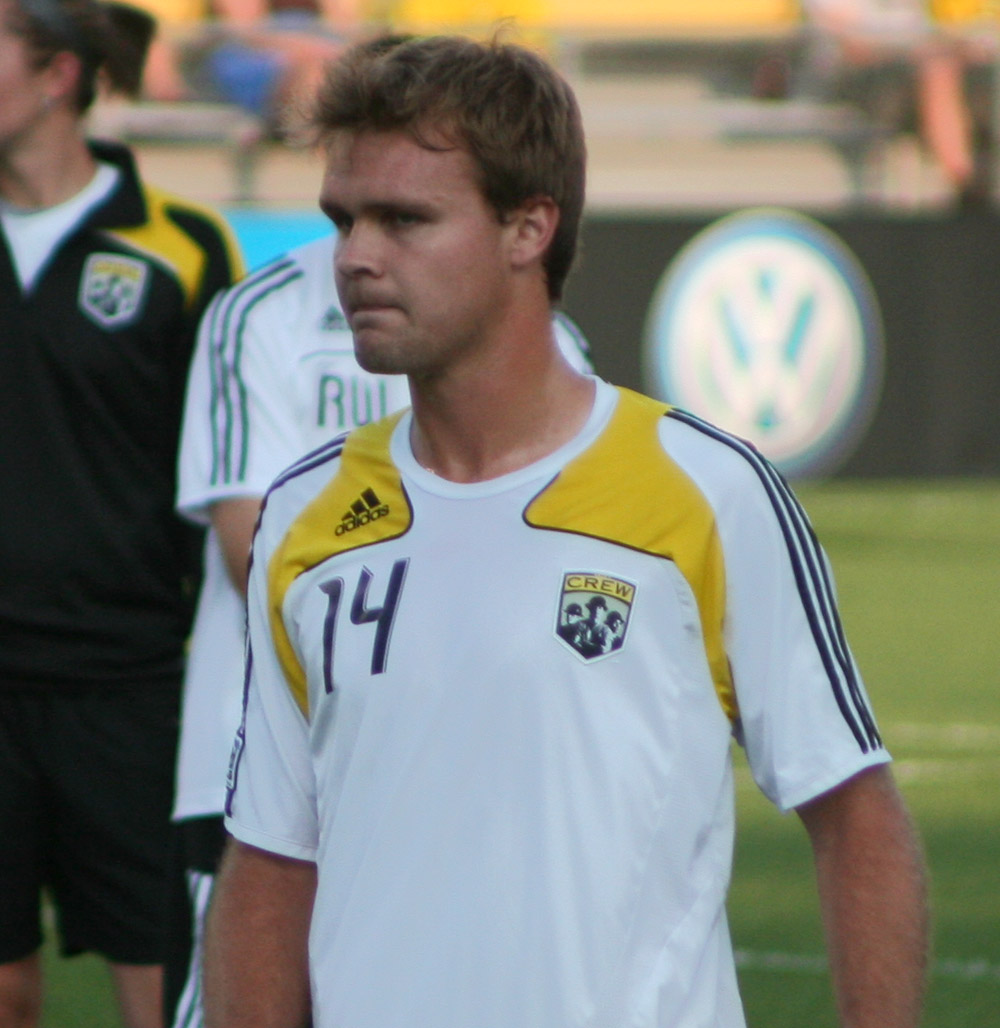
Marshall with the Columbus Crew in 2008

Marshall was drafted second overall in the 2004 MLS SuperDraft by Columbus Crew. He had an exemplary first year, anchoring the Crew defense along with Robin Fraser, who won the MLS Defender of the Year award that season, and helped the team to an eighteen-game unbeaten streak and the MLS Supporters' Shield. He finished the season with twenty-seven starts, and was a close second to Clint Dempsey in the voting for the MLS Rookie of the Year Award. He only played in twelve matches in 2007 due to ongoing concussion issues that threatened to end his career.

Marshall's strongest campaign with the Crew came in 2008. He led the defense on the squad that won both the Supporters' Shield and the MLS Cup 2008, a game in which Marshall scored the game-winning goal. After the season, he was voted to the MLS Best XI and was also awarded the MLS Defender of the Year award, beating competition from Bakary Soumaré and Jimmy Conrad.

Marshall's contract ran out after the 2008 campaign. After a brief trial for part of December with German 2. Bundesliga side Mainz 05 he re-signed with Columbus on December 26, 2008.

In 2009, Marshall was awarded MLS Player of the Month award while playing every minute of the Crew's four games that month, scoring two game-winning goals, and helping Columbus to three shutout victories.

On March 17, 2011, Marshall was named captain of Columbus Crew for the 2011 season to fill the void left by departing captain Frankie Hejduk. In December 2011, Columbus signed Marshall to a long-term contract extension through the 2015 MLS season.

During the 2012 season, Marshall missed eight games due to a concussion.

On December 12, 2013, Marshall was traded to Seattle Sounders FC in exchange for allocation money and a third-round 2015 MLS SuperDraft pick. He scored his first goal as a Sounder, a game-winning header in the 84th minute, against the Philadelphia Union on May 3. He was named MLS Defender of the Year for the third time as the Sounders won the Supporters' Shield.

On May 22, 2019, Marshall announced his retirement from professional soccer due to injury, concluding a historic 16-year Major League Soccer career at age 34.

== International career ==
As a teenager, Marshall trained at the United States Soccer Federation's exclusive Bradenton Academy and has played for several United States youth national teams. He played for the United States at the 2003 FIFA World Youth Championship, now commonly known as the FIFA U-20 World Cup, in the United Arab Emirates. He later moved up and earned time with the Under-23 team.

Marshall earned his first cap and scored his first goal for the senior national team on March 9, 2005, against Colombia. Marshall was selected for the 2009 CONCACAF Gold Cup for the United States and received his first cap since 2005 in the side's opening match against Grenada. Marshall went on to play in five games throughout the tournament and garnered Gold Cup All-Tournament honors.

On May 11, 2010, Bob Bradley, the U.S. Men's National Team head coach selected Marshall for the 30-man preliminary roster for the 2010 FIFA World Cup. On May 26, 2010, Bradley decided to keep Marshall off the 23 man roster for the 2010 FIFA World Cup.

On January 6, 2017, after almost seven years of absence from international soccer, Marshall was called for the United States national team by coach Bruce Arena.

== Style of play ==
Marshall is known for his aerial ability, strength, consistency, defensive positioning, and his comfort with the ball at his feet.

== Career statistics ==
=== Club statistics ===
As of match played May 22, 2019

Club	Season	League			Playoffs		Cup		Continental (Note: Includes CONCACAF Champions League)		Total	
Club	Season	Division	Apps	Goals	Apps	Goals	Apps	Goals	Apps	Goals	Apps	Goals
Columbus Crew	2004	MLS	28	0	2	0	0	0	—		30	0
Columbus Crew	2005	MLS	30	1	—		0	0	—		30	1
Columbus Crew	2006	MLS	26	1	—		0	0	—		26	1
Columbus Crew	2007	MLS	12	2	—		0	0	—		12	2
Columbus Crew	2008	MLS	29	4	4	2	0	0	—		33	6
Columbus Crew	2009	MLS	18	4	2	0	0	0	2	0	22	4
Columbus Crew	2010	MLS	24	2	2	0	3	0	3	0	32	2
Columbus Crew	2011	MLS	32	0	1	0	0	0	—		33	0
Columbus Crew	2012	MLS	24	2	—		0	0	—		24	2
Columbus Crew	2013	MLS	30	1	—		0	0	—		30	1
Columbus Crew	Total		253	17	11	2	3	0	5	0	272	19
Seattle Sounders FC	2014	MLS	31	1	4	0	3	0	—		38	1
Seattle Sounders FC	2015	MLS	29	0	3	1	1	0	1	0	34	1
Seattle Sounders FC	2016	MLS	30	4	6	0	0	0	2	0	38	4
Seattle Sounders FC	2017	MLS	28	1	5	0	0	0	—		33	1
Seattle Sounders FC	2018	MLS	30	4	1	0	0	0	4	1	35	5
Seattle Sounders FC	2019	MLS	8	0	0	0	0	0	—		8	0
Seattle Sounders FC	Total		156	10	19	1	4	0	7	1	186	12
Career total			409	27	30	3	7	0	12	1	458	31

=== International ===
As of match played January 29, 2017

Appearances and goals by national team and year
National team	Year	Apps	Goals
United States	2005	4	1
United States	2009	6	0
United States	2010	1	0
United States	2017	1	0
Total		12	1

As of match played January 29, 2017
United States score listed first, score column indicates score after each Marshall goal.

List of international goals scored by Chad Marshall
No.	Date	Venue	Cap	Opponent	Score	Result	Competition
1	March 9, 2005	Titan Stadium, Fullerton, United States	1	Colombia	2–0	3–0	Friendly

== Honors ==
Columbus Crew

- MLS Cup: 2008
- MLS Supporters' Shield: 2004, 2008, 2009

Seattle Sounders

- MLS Cup: 2016
- MLS Supporters' Shield: 2014
- U.S. Open Cup: 2014

Individual

- MLS Defender of the Year: 2008, 2009, 2014
- MLS Best XI: 2008, 2009, 2014, 2018
- MLS Player of the Month: August 2009, September 2016
- MLS All-Star: 2009, 2010, 2014, 2015
- CONCACAF Gold Cup All-Tournament Team: 2009
- MLS 400 Games Club

Records

- Columbus Crew all-time appearance holder: 277 total appearances
