= Juan Pietravallo =

Argentine footballer

Personal information
- Full name: Juan Martín Pietravallo
- Date of birth: December 7, 1981 (age 44)
- Place of birth: Buenos Aires, Argentina
- Height: 1.76 m (5 ft 9 in)
- Position: Defensive midfielder

Youth career
- Vélez Sársfield

Senior career*
Years	Team	Apps	(Gls)
2000–2002	Vélez Sársfield	31	(0)
2002–2003	Olimpo	16	(0)
2003	CD Leganés	15	(0)
2004	Gimnasia La Plata	8	(0)
2004–2005	Atlético de Rafaela	38	(1)
2005–2006	Quilmes	34	(0)
2006–2007	Nueva Chicago	12	(0)
2007	Belgrano	16	(0)
2008	Veria	3	(0)
2008–2009	New York Red Bulls	16	(0)
2009–2010	Olhanense	4	(0)
2010–2011	Atlético de Rafaela	4	(0)
2012	Aragua	8	(0)
2012–2013	Melgar	32	(0)
2013–2014	Brown Adrogué	1	(0)
- * Club domestic league appearances and goals as of 10 December 2012

Juan Martín Pietravallo (born December 7, 1981) is an Argentine footballer.

== Career ==
Pietravallo started his career at Vélez Sársfield, where he made his first appearance in the Clausura 2000 tournament. He played for Vélez until he moved to Olimpo in 2002. In 2003, he played for CD Leganés in Spain, but returned to Argentina to play for Gimnasia La Plata in 2004. In 2005, he joined Atlético de Rafaela and was a key player in the midfield leading the club to the promotion playoffs, where they fell short of reaching the Argentine first division being defeated by Argentinos Juniors.

Following his successful stay at Rafaela he returned to the first division joining Quilmes where he played until mid-2006. During the 2006–07 season he played for Nueva Chicago and then joined Belgrano during the second semester of 2007. From January 2008 to July 2008 he played in Greece's highest professional football league for Veria.

Following a brief stay in the Greek top flight, Pietravallo was signed by New York Red Bulls of Major League Soccer during the summer 2008 transfer window, but was released on June 26, 2009, having made just 16 MLS appearances for the New York club.

== Statistics ==
League	Appearances	Goals
Primera División Argentina	102	0
Primera B Nacional Argentina	53	1
CONMEBOL Cup Competitions	14	0
Segunda División	15	0
Super League Greece	3	0
Major League Soccer	16	0

== Honors ==
=== New York Red Bulls ===
- Major League Soccer Western Conference Championship (1): 2008
