= Dave van den Bergh =

Dutch footballer and coach

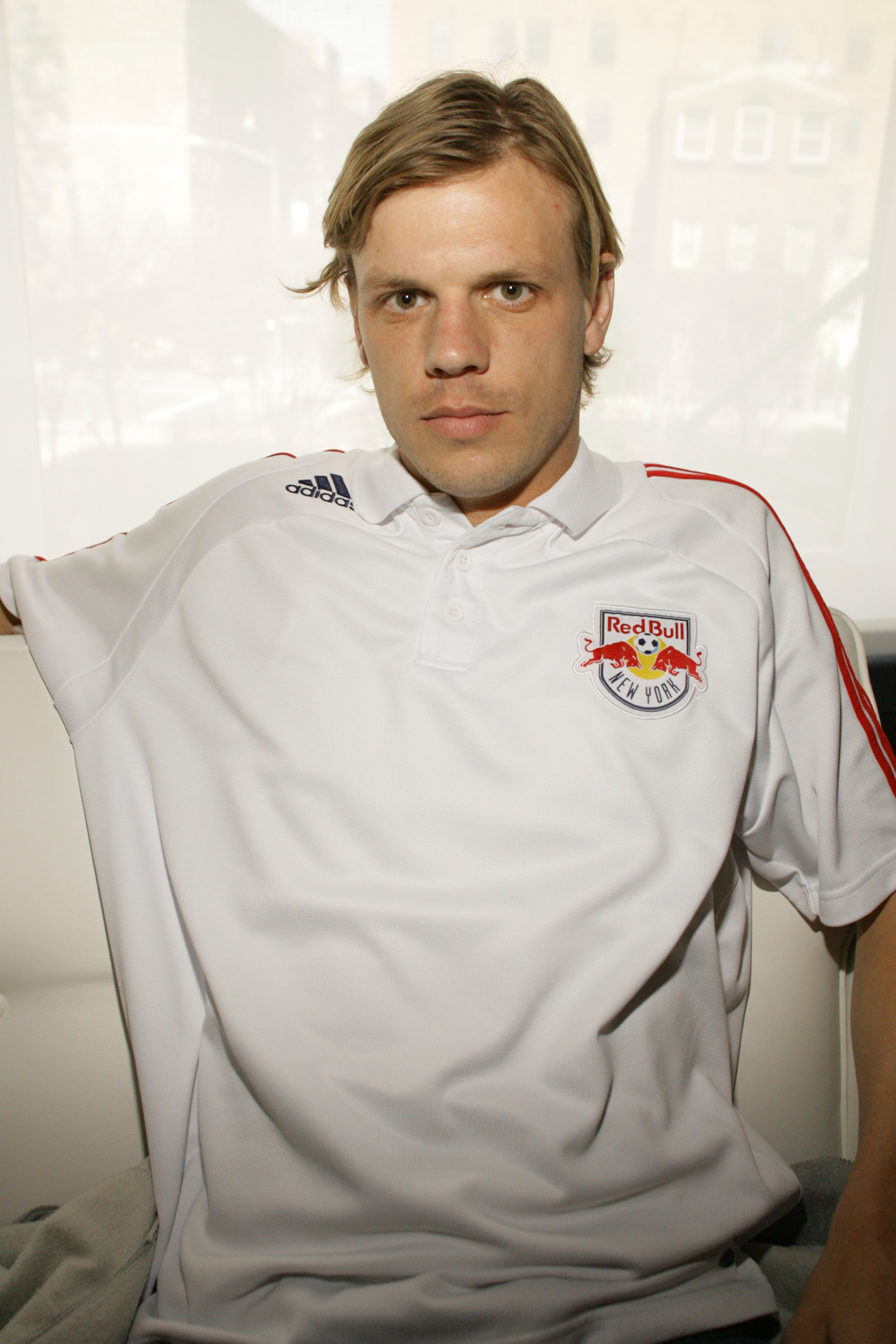

Personal information
- Date of birth: 7 May 1976 (age 50)
- Place of birth: Amsterdam, Netherlands
- Height: 1.88 m (6 ft 2 in)
- Position: Left winger

Youth career
- 1986–1995: Ajax

Senior career*
Years	Team	Apps	(Gls)
1995–1997	Ajax	11	(1)
1997–2000	Rayo Vallecano	47	(6)
2000–2006	FC Utrecht	184	(29)
2006	Kansas City Wizards	13	(3)
2007–2008	New York Red Bulls	55	(9)
2009	FC Dallas	30	(3)
Total		340	(51)

International career
2004	Netherlands	2	(0)

Managerial career
- 2010–2016: United States U20 (assistant)
- 2016–2018: United States U15
- 2018: United States U19
- 2019–2023: New England Revolution (assistant)
- 2024–2026: Portland Timbers (assistant)
- * Club domestic league appearances and goals

Dave van den Bergh (Dutch pronunciation: [ˈdeː(f) fɑn də(m) ˈbɛr(ə)x]; born 7 May 1976) is a Dutch football coach and former player who played as a left winger.

== Playing career ==
=== Europe ===
A product of the famed AFC Ajax youth program, Van den Bergh played for Ajax from 1995 to 1997, winning one league title during that time and reaching the finals and the year after the semifinals of the UEFA Champions League. Between 1997 and 2000, he played for Rayo Vallecano in Spain, helping the team get promoted to the Primera División, and earning their first UEFA Cup qualification. Between 2000 and 2006, he played for Utrecht in the Netherlands, contributing 29 league goals over that span and helped the team earn five straight UEFA Cup appearances.

He was a member of the Utrecht squad that won the Dutch Cup in 2003 (4–1 against Feyenoord) and 2004 (1–0 against FC Twente), scoring the only goal in the 2004 final. Also in 2004, he won the Dutch Super Cup (4–2 against AFC Ajax), ranking him among the most successful Utrecht players.

=== United States ===
In June 2006, Van den Bergh (who is married to an American) was signed by the Kansas City Wizards, for whom he scored three goals in thirteen appearances . Prior to the 2007 MLS season, he was traded to New York Red Bulls in exchange for a third-round draft pick in the 2007 MLS Supplemental Draft. During the 2007 season, Van den Bergh obtained a U.S. Green Card, meaning that he was now considered a domestic player instead of a senior international. He quickly established himself as the team's starting left winger, and also moved to the left back position. He ended his first season with the club appearing in 29 league matches, including 26 starts. He tallied two goals and led the club with eight assists. In 2008 Van den Bergh continued his fine play with New York appearing in 26 league matches recording seven goals and five assists. He scored the most important goal in club history in the Western Conference Final leading New York to a 1–0 victory over Real Salt Lake and a berth in the 2008 MLS Cup.

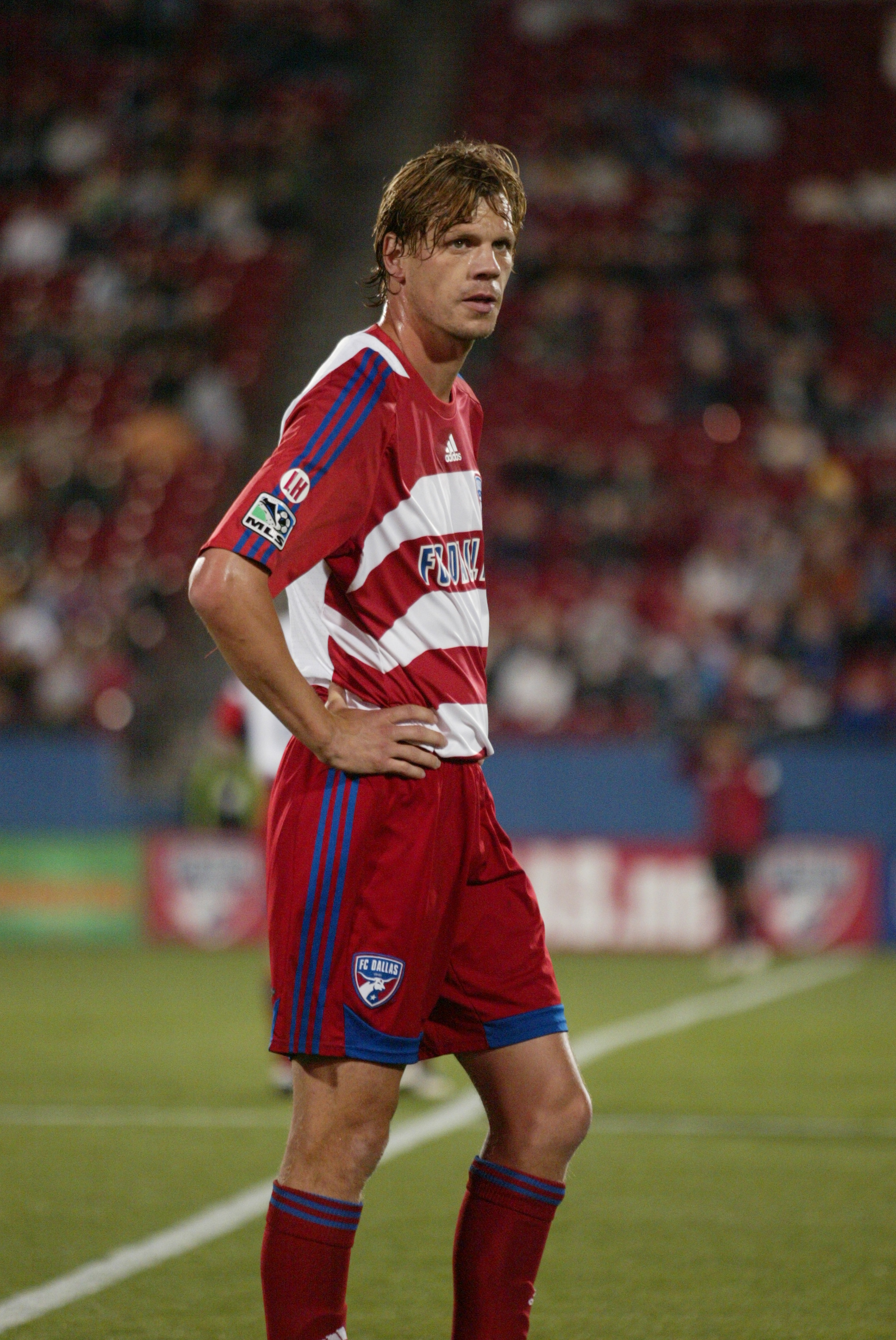
Van den Bergh with FC Dallas

New York traded Van den Bergh to FC Dallas on 12 January 2009, for forward Dominic Oduro and FC Dallas's second-round pick (selection #18) in the 2009 MLS SuperDraft. As part of the trade, the two teams also exchanged 2009 MLS SuperDraft first-round picks; New York received FC Dallas's #11 selection while FC Dallas took New York's slot at #14. In 2009 Van den Bergh had another impressive season appearing in all 30 regular season matches for Dallas recording three goals and 11 assists.

The 2010 MLS season showed Van den Bergh to be a man without a team. In spite of what many would argue was a career campaign in 2009 for the crafty veteran left winger, FC Dallas waived Van den Bergh prior to the start of the 2010 season after he reportedly questioned coach Schellas Hyndman's coaching style. However FC Dallas maintained his rights in MLS and apparently the club made it very difficult for Van den Bergh to move to a new team. “I have not talked with anyone (from the Red Bulls) or an MLS team. I’m unemployed. I’m open to playing for certain teams, not any team”.

=== International ===
Van den Bergh was capped by the Netherlands on two occasions, both coming in 2004 when he was with Utrecht. He made his international debut on 18 October of that year in a 2–2 draw against Sweden. He also represented his country at the 1995 FIFA U-20 World Cup.

== Coaching career ==
Van der Bergh has coached at various youth levels in the United States Soccer Federation system, including the U-15, U-19 and U-20 Men’s National Teams. He was an assistant coach with the New England Revolution from 2019 to 2023, before joining the Portland Timbers as an assistant coach in 2024.

== Honors ==
Ajax

- Eredivisie: 1995–96
- UEFA Super Cup: 1995
- UEFA Champions League runner-up: 1995-96

Utrecht

- KNVB Cup: 2002–03, 2003–04
- Johan Cruijff Shield: 2004

New York Red Bulls

- MLS Western Conference: 2008
