= List of Major League Soccer transfers 2008 =

This is a list of American soccer transfers for the 2008 Major League Soccer season.

== Chivas USA ==
This is a list of transfers for CD Chivas USA.

=== In ===
- (United States) Jim Curtin Traded from Chicago Fire
- (United States) Alecko Eskandarian Traded from Real Salt Lake
- (Saint Kitts and Nevis) Atiba Harris Traded from Real Salt Lake for a third-round SuperDraft pick
- (United States) Keith Savage Drafted 43rd overall in the 2008 MLS Superdraft
- (Switzerland) Raphaël Wicky Acquired from (Switzerland) FC Sion
- (United States) Zach Thornton Traded from New York Red Bulls for future considerations

=== Out ===
- (United States) Jason Hernandez Lost to San Jose Earthquakes in the Expansion Draft
- (United States) Tony Barrera Traded to San Jose Earthquakes
- (United States) Preston Burpo Traded to San Jose Earthquakes for a fourth round SuperDraft pick.
- (United States) David Arvizu Waived
- (United States) Carlos Borja Waived
- (United States) Desmond Brooks Waived
- (United States) Carlos Llamosa Waived
- (Mexico) Rodrigo López Waived, later signed with Ventura County Fusion
- (France) Laurent Merlin Waived
- (United States) Justin Myers Waived
- (Honduras) Ramón Núñez Waived later signed with (Honduras) Olimpia
- (United States) Orlando Perez Waived
- (United States) Eder Robles Waived, later signed with Hollywood United
- (United States) Mohammed Sethi Waived
- (Mexico) Erasmo Solorzano Waived, later signed with Bakersfield Brigade
- (United States) Brad Guzan Transferred to (England) Aston Villa

== Chicago Fire ==
This is a list of transfers for the Chicago Fire.

=== In ===
- (Ghana) Patrick Nyarko Drafted 7th overall in 2008 MLS Superdraft
- (United States) Dominic Cervi Drafted 12th overall in 2008 MLS Superdraft
- (United States) Peter Lowry Drafted 26th overall in 2008 MLS Superdraft
- (United States) Dwight Barnett Drafted 38th overall in 2008 MLS Superdraft
- (United States) Stephen King Drafted 40th overall in 2008 MLS Superdraft
- (United States) Austin Washington Drafted 54th overall in 2008 MLS Superdraft
- (Costa Rica) Andy Herron Rights acquired from Columbus Crew for 4th round pick in the 2010 Superdraft
- (Poland) Tomasz Frankowski Signed from (England) Wolverhampton Wanderers
- (United States) Brandon Prideaux Acquired in waiver draft from Colorado Rapids
- (Paraguay) Líder Mármol Signed as free agent.
- (United States) Brian McBride Received rights in trade with Toronto FC

=== Out ===
- (United States) Matt Pickens To (England) Queens Park Rangers
- (Honduras) Iván Guerrero Lost to San Jose Earthquakes in the Expansion Draft
- (United States) Jim Curtin Traded to Chivas USA
- (United States) Chris Armas Retired
- (Costa Rica) Paulo Wanchope Retired
- (United States) Jeff Curtin Waived, later signed with D.C. United
- (Trinidad and Tobago) Osei Telesford Waived, later signed with Puerto Rico Islanders
- (United States) Chad Barrett Traded to Toronto FC in Brian McBride deal

== Colorado Rapids ==
This is a list of transfers for the Colorado Rapids.

=== In ===
- (United States) José Burciaga, Jr Traded from Kansas City Wizards for a 2009 Second Round Draft Pick
- (United States) Ciaran O'Brien Drafted 5th overall in 2008 MLS Superdraft
- (United States) Adrian Chevannes Drafted 36th overall in 2008 MLS Superdraft
- (United States) Brian Grazier Drafted 47th overall in 2008 MLS Superdraft
- (United States) Scott Campbell Drafted 49th overall in 2008 MLS Superdraft
- (United States) Chase Hilgenbrinck Acquired from (Chile) Ñublense
- (Argentina) Christian Gómez Acquired from D.C. United
- (Scotland) Tam McManus Acquired from (Scotland) Dunfermline Athletic
- (United States) Preston Burpo Traded from San Jose Earthquakes for 2009 draft pick
- (United States) Greg Dalby Acquired on free transfer
- (United States) Cory Gibbs Acquired on free transfer

=== Out ===
- (Mexico) Daniel Osorno signed with (Mexico) Dorados de Sinaloa
- (United States) Zach ThorntonWaived, later signed with New York Red Bulls
- (Uruguay) José Cancela Waived, later signed with (Uruguay) Fénix
- (United States) Tony Sanneh Waived

== Columbus Crew ==
This is a list of transfers for the Columbus Crew.

=== In ===
- (United States) Brian Carroll Traded from San Jose Earthquakes for (Sierra Leone) Kei Kamara
- (England) Andy Iro Drafted 6th overall in 2008 MLS Superdraft
- (United States) George Josten Drafted 20th overall in 2008 MLS Superdraft
- (Haiti) Ricardo Pierre-Louis Drafted 22nd overall in 2008 MLS Superdraft
- (United States) Ryan Miller Drafted 31st overall in 2008 MLS Superdraft
- (United States) Steven Lenhart Drafted 48th overall in 2008 MLS Superdraft
- (Brazil) Guilherme Só
- (Argentina) Gino Padula Acquired from (France) Montpellier HSC
- (United States) Pat Noonan Free Agent

=== Out ===
- (United States) Ned Grabavoy Lost to San Jose Earthquakes in the Expansion Draft
- (Sierra Leone) Kei Kamara Traded to San Jose Earthquakes for (United States) Brian Carroll
- (England) Ben Hunter Waived, later signed with Richmond Kickers
- (Chile) Marcos González To (Chile) Universidad Católica
- (United States) Jacob Thomas Waived
- (Costa Rica) Andy Herron Traded to Chicago Fire for 4th round pick in the 2010 Superdraft
- (United States) Brandon Moss Retired
- (Trinidad and Tobago) Andrei Pacheco Waived, later signed with (Trinidad and Tobago) W Connection

== D.C. United ==
This is a list of transfers for D.C. United.

=== In ===
- (United States) Zach Wells Traded from Houston Dynamo for (United States) Bobby Boswell
- (United States) Ryan Cordeiro Drafted 33rd overall in 2008 MLS Superdraft
- (Argentina) Franco Niell Loan from (Argentina) Argentinos Juniors
- (Colombia) Gonzalo Martínez From (Colombia) Millonarios
- (Argentina) Marcelo Gallardo From (France) Paris Saint-Germain
- (Peru) José Carvallo Loan from (Peru) Universitario de Deportes
- (Argentina) Gonzalo Peralta Acquired from (Argentina) Club Almirante Brown
- (England) Dan Stratford Drafted 24th overall in the 2008 MLS Supplemental Draft
- (United States) James Thorpe Drafted 52nd overall in the 2008 MLS Supplemental Draft
- (United States) Quavas Kirk Acquired from Los Angeles Galaxy for (United States) Greg Vanney
- (United States) Pat Carroll Signed as a discovery player
- (United States) Santino Quaranta Signed as a free agent from New York Red Bulls
- (United States) Jeff Curtin Picked up in waiver draft from Chicago Fire
- (United States) Jeremy Barlow Traded from Houston Dynamo
- (United States) Dane Murphy Signed after a successful trial
- (United States) Mike Zaher From Toronto FC
- (Liberia) Francis Doe Free agent
- (United States) Craig Thompson From Houston Dynamo
- (United States) Joe Vide Free agent
- (Honduras) Iván Guerrero Traded from San Jose Earthquakes for partial allocation
- (Liberia) Louis Crayton From (Switzerland) FC Basel
- (South Africa) Thabiso Khumalo Acquired from Pittsburgh Riverhounds
- (United States) Greg Janicki Acquired from Pittsburgh Riverhounds
- (Sierra Leone) Ibrahim Koroma Acquired from (Sierra Leone) Kallon F.C.
- (United States) Ryan Miller Acquired off waivers from Columbus Crew

=== Out ===
- (United States) Brian Carroll Lost to San Jose Earthquakes in 2007 MLS Expansion Draft
- (United States) Brad North Waived
- (United States) Shawn Crowe Waived
- (United States) Mira Mupier Waived, later signed with (Denmark) Jetsmark IF
- (United States) Kiki Willis Waived
- (United States) Bobby Boswell Traded to Houston Dynamo for (United States) Zach Wells and 2009 draft pick
- (United States) Troy Perkins To (Norway) Vålerenga I.F.
- (United States) Jay Nolly Waived, later signed with (Canada) Vancouver Whitecaps
- (Jamaica) Nicholas Addlery Waived, later signed with (Canada) Vancouver Whitecaps
- (United States) Bryan Arguez To (Germany) Hertha Berlin
- (Jamaica) Stephen deRoux Waived, later signed with Minnesota Thunder
- (Argentina) Christian Gómez Traded to Colorado Rapids
- (United States) Joshua Gros Retired
- (United States) Greg Vanney Traded to Los Angeles Galaxy for (United States) Quavas Kirk
- (Angola) Jerson Monteiro Waived, later signed with Atlanta Silverbacks
- (United States) Jamil Walker Waived, later signed with Carolina RailHawks
- (Ivory Coast) Guy-Roland Kpene Waived, later signed with Houston Dynamo
- (United States) Jeff Curtin Retired
- (Argentina) Franco Niell Waived
- (Peru) José Carvallo Waived
- (United States) Jeremy Barlow Waived, later signed with Los Angeles Galaxy
- (England) Dan Stratford Waived
- (United States) Dane Murphy Waived

== FC Dallas ==
This is a list of transfers for FC Dallas.

=== In ===
- (Mexico) Duilio Davino Loan from (Mexico) Club América
- (United States) Brek Shea Drafted 2nd overall in the 2008 MLS SuperDraft
- (United States) Josh Lambo Drafted 8th overall in the 2008 MLS SuperDraft
- (United States) Eric Avila Drafted 19th overall in the 2008 MLS SuperDraft
- (United States) Jamil Roberts Drafted 45th overall in the 2008 MLS SuperDraft
- (United States) Ben Nason Drafted 50th overall in the 2008 MLS SuperDraft
- (Brazil) André Rocha Loan from (Brazil) Clube Atletico Paranaense
- (Jamaica) Jeff Cunningham Traded from Toronto FC for a 2009 3rd Round MLS Superdraft pick

=== Out ===
- (United States) Clarence Goodson Lost to San Jose Earthquakes in the Expansion Draft
- (Brazil) Denilson Released
- (Guatemala) Carlos Ruíz Traded to Los Angeles Galaxy for allocation money and a 2009 SuperDraft pick
- (Trinidad and Tobago) Shaka Hislop Retired
- (Colombia) Juan Botero Waived, later signed with (Colombia) CD Atlético Huila
- (Liberia) Chris Gbandi To (Norway) FK Haugesund
- (United States) Abdus Ibrahim Traded to Toronto FC
- (Colombia) Juan Carlos Toja Transferred to (Romania) FC Steaua București
- (United States) Arturo Alvarez Traded to San Jose Earthquakes

== Houston Dynamo ==
This is a list of transfers for the Houston Dynamo.

=== In ===
- (United States) Bobby Boswell Traded from D.C. United for (United States) Zach Wells and 2009 draft pick
- (United States) Geoff Cameron 2008 MLS SuperDraft 3rd Round Pick
- (United States) Jeremy Barlow 2008 MLS SuperDraft 4th Round Pick
- (Argentina) Franco Caraccio Signed from (Argentina) Arsenal de Sarandí
- (England) Tony Caig Signed from (Scotland) Gretna F.C.
- (Ivory Coast) Guy-Roland Kpene Signed from D.C. United
- (United States) Nate Jaqua Resigned, Contract expired from (Austria) SCR Altach
- (Sierra Leone) Kei Kamara Traded from San Jose Earthquakes for a draft pick and allocation

=== Out ===
- (United States) Ryan Cochrane Lost to San Jose Earthquakes in the Expansion Draft
- (United States) Kenneth Hoerner Waived
- (United States) Jordan James Waived
- (United States) Zach Wells Traded to D.C. United for (United States) Bobby Boswell
- (Scotland) Paul Dalglish Released, Later moved to (Scotland) Kilmarnock
- (Zimbabwe) Joseph Ngwenya To SK Austria Kärnten
- (United States) Nate Jaqua To (Austria) SCR Altach
- (Argentina) Franco Caraccio Released, Later moved to (Argentina) All Boys

== Kansas City Wizards ==
This is a list of transfers for the Kansas City Wizards.

=== In ===
- (United States) Chance Myers Defender selected #1 in the 2008 MLS SuperDraft from UCLA
- (Honduras) Roger Espinoza Midfielder selected #11 in the 2008 MLS SuperDraft from Ohio State
- (Cameroon) Yomby William Defender selected #23 in the 2008 MLS SuperDraft from Old Dominion
- (United States) Jonathan Leathers Defender selected #25 in the 2008 MLS SuperDraft from Furman
- (United States) Matt Marquess Defender selected #39 in the 2008 MLS SuperDraft from Santa Clara
- (United States) Rauwshan McKenzie Defender selected #53 in the 2008 MLS SuperDraft from Michigan State
- (Argentina) Claudio López Signed as a Designated Player on a Free Transfer
- (United States) Josh Wolff Free Agent
- (Colombia) Iván Trujillo From (Colombia) La Equidad

=== Out ===
- (United States) Edson Elcock Waived, later signed with Puerto Rico Islanders
- (United States) A.J. Godbolt Waived, later signed with Austin Aztex U23
- (United States) Willy Guadarrama Waived, later signed with Austin Aztex U23
- (United States) Chris KonopkaWaived, later signed with (Republic of Ireland) Bohemians
- (United States) Nick Garcia Traded to San Jose Earthquakes for #1 2008 MLS Superdraft Pick
- (United States) Jose Burciaga Jr Traded to Colorado Rapids for 2009 second round Superdraft Pick
- (United States) Eddie Johnson To (England) Fulham F.C
- (United States) Will John To (Denmark) Randers FC

== Los Angeles Galaxy ==
This is a list of transfers for the Los Angeles Galaxy.

=== In ===
- (United States) Clint Mathis Traded from New York Red Bulls for a third round SuperDraft pick
- (Guatemala) Carlos Ruíz Traded from FC Dallas for allocation money and a 2009 SuperDraft pick
- (United States) Sean Franklin Drafted 4th overall in 2008 MLS Superdraft
- (United States) Ely Allen Drafted 21st overall in 2008 MLS Superdraft
- (United States) Julian Valentin Drafted 29th overall in 2008 MLS Superdraft
- (United States) Matt Allen Drafted 34th overall in 2008 MLS Superdraft
- (United States) Brandon McDonald Drafted 46th overall in 2008 MLS Superdraft
- (United States) Matt Hatzke Drafted 51st overall in 2008 MLS Superdraft
- (Nigeria) Celestine Babayaro Free Agent
- (Argentina) Eduardo Domínguez Acquired from Club Atlético Huracán
- (United States) Eddie Lewis Acquired from Derby County

=== Out ===
- (Turks and Caicos Islands) Gavin Glinton Lost to San Jose Earthquakes in the Expansion Draft
- (United States) Joe Cannon Traded to San Jose Earthquakes for a partial allocation.
- (United States) Chris Albright Traded to New England Revolution for salary cap allocation
- (United States) Cobi Jones Retired
- (United States) Mike Caso Waived
- (United States) Lance Friesz Waived
- (Honduras) Carlos PavónWaived, later signed with (Honduras) Real España
- (United States) Kyle Veris Waived, later signed with (Norway) IL Hødd
- (United States) Clint Mathis To (Greece) Ergotelis F.C.
- (Canada) Kevin Harmse Traded to Toronto FC for 2009 MLS Superdraft pick (4th round)
- (Nigeria) Celestine Babayaro Waived
- (Portugal) Abel Xavier Waived
- (Guatemala) Carlos Ruíz Traded to Toronto FC for 2009 MLS Supplementary Draft picks (1st and 2nd rounds)

== New England Revolution ==
This is a list of transfers for the New England Revolution.

=== In ===
- (Honduras) Mauricio Castro Acquired from (Honduras) Club Deportivo Olimpia
- (Costa Rica) Argenis Fernández Acquired from (Costa Rica) Santos de Guápiles
- (United States) José Angulo Allocated by MLS as a discovery player
- (United States) Chris Albright Traded from Los Angeles Galaxy for salary cap allocation
- (United States) Rob Valentino Drafted 13th overall in the 2008 SuperDraft
- (United States) Michael Videira Drafted 18th overall in the 2008 SuperDraft
- (United States) Joe Germanese Drafted 27th overall in the 2008 SuperDraft
- (Canada) Matt Britner Drafted 41st overall in the 2008 SuperDraft
- (United States) Spencer Wadsworth Drafted 55th overall in the 2008 SuperDraft
- (Zimbabwe) Kheli Dube Drafted 8th overall in the 2008 MLS Supplemental Draft
- (United States) Chris Tierney Drafted 13th overall in the 2008 MLS Supplemental Draft
- (United States) Kyle Altman Drafted 27th overall in the 2008 MLS Supplemental Draft
- (Kenya) Saidi Isaac Drafted 41st overall in the 2008 MLS Supplemental Draft, later returned to play for Indiana Invaders

=== Out ===
- (United States) James Riley Lost to San Jose Earthquakes in the Expansion Draft
- (Guatemala) Willie Sims Waived, later signed with Miami FC
- (United States) Marshall Leonard Waived
- (United States) Miguel Gonzalez Waived
- (United States) Chris Loftus Waived, later signed with (Sweden) Bunkeflo IF
- (Republic of Ireland) Bryan Byrne Waived, later signed with Ventura County Fusion
- (Wales) Andy Dorman Free transfer to (Scotland) St Mirren F.C.
- (United States) Pat Noonan Free transfer to (Norway) Aalesunds FK
- (Canada) Matt Britner Waived

== New York Red Bulls ==
This is a list of transfers for New York Red Bulls.

=== In ===
- (United States) Zach Thornton Free agent
- (United States) Eric Brunner Drafted 16th overall in 2008 MLS Superdraft
- (United States) Luke Sassano Drafted 32nd overall in 2008 MLS Superdraft
- (United States) David Roth Drafted 44th overall in 2008 MLS Superdraft
- (Colombia) Oscar Echeverry Free agent
- (South Africa) Danleigh Borman Drafted 7th overall in 2008 MLS Supplemental Draft
- (United States) Michael Palacio Drafted 21st overall in 2008 MLS Supplemental Draft
- (United States) John Gilkerson Drafted 35th overall in 2008 MLS Supplemental Draft
- (Australia) Caleb Patterson-Sewell Free agent
- (United States) Kevin Mesa Free agent
- (United States) Ricky Schramm Free agent
- (Puerto Rico) Chris Megaloudis Free agent
- (New Zealand) Andrew Boyens Free agent
- (United States) Gordon Klejstan
- (Venezuela) Jorge Rojas Free agent
- (Argentina) Juan Pietravallo Free agent
- (Mexico) DiegoJiménez Free agent
- (Venezuela) Gabriel Cichero On loan from Deportivo Italia
- (Cameroon) Matthew Mbuta Acquired from Crystal Palace Baltimore
- (Senegal) Macoumba Kandji $25,000 loan from Atlanta Silverbacks. If the loan was a success, then another fee of $150,000 would be paid for Kandji, making the total amount paid $175,000.

=== Out ===
- (United States) Clint Mathis Traded to Los Angeles Galaxy for a third round SuperDraft pick
- (United States) Joe Vide Drafted by San Jose Earthquakes in the Expansion Draft
- (United States) Blake Camp Waived, later signed with Atlanta Silverbacks
- (Netherlands) Ronald Waterreus Retired
- (Austria) Markus Schopp Retired
- (United States) Santino Quaranta Waived, later signed with D.C. United
- (United States) Sal Caccavale Waived
- (United States) Randi Patterson Waived, later signed with Charleston Battery
- (United States) Chris Karcz Waived, later signed with Newark Ironbound Express
- (France) Elie Ikangu Waived
- (Liberia) Francis Doe Waived, later signed with D.C. United
- (Ukraine) Dema Kovalenko Traded to Real Salt Lake for undisclosed 2010 MLS Superdraft pick
- (Haiti) Jerrod Laventure Waived, later signed with Newark Ironbound Express
- (United States) Eric Brunner Released, later signed with Miami FC
- (United States) Jozy Altidore Transferred to (Spain) Villarreal for $10,000,000
- (United States) Kevin Mesa Released
- (United States) Claudio Reyna Retired
- (United States) Ricky Schramm Waived
- (United States) Zach Thornton Traded to CD Chivas USA for future considerations

== Real Salt Lake ==
This is a list of transfers for Real Salt Lake.

=== In ===
- (United States) Ian Joy Free transfer from (Germany) FC St. Pauli
- (Scotland) Kenny Deuchar Free transfer from (Scotland) Gretna F.C.
- (Colombia) Jámison Olave Loan from (Colombia) Deportivo Cali
- (Argentina) Matías Córdoba Loan from (Argentina) Argentinos Juniors
- (United States) Tony Beltran Drafted 3rd overall in 2008 MLS SuperDraft
- (United States) Alex Nimo Drafted 17th overall in 2008 MLS SuperDraft
- (United States) David Horst Drafted 14th overall in 2008 MLS SuperDraft
- (United States) Brennan Tennelle Drafted 37th overall in 2008 MLS SuperDraft

=== Out ===
- (United States) Eddie Pope Retired
- (United States) Chris Brown Waived, later signed with Portland Timbers
- (United States) Steven Curfman Waived, later signed with Carolina RailHawks
- (United States) Christian Jimenez Waived
- (Ivory Coast) Jean-Martial Kipre Waived
- (United States) Jack Stewart Waived, later signed with (Norway) Moss FK
- (Saint Kitts and Nevis) Atiba Harris Traded to CD Chivas USA for a third-round SuperDraft pick
- (United States) Jamie Watson Waived, later signed with Austin Aztex U23
- (United States) Alecko EskandarianTraded to Chivas USA for allocation money

== San Jose Earthquakes ==
This is a list of transfers for the San Jose Earthquakes.

=== In ===
- (United States) Arturo Alvarez - Trade with FC Dallas
- (Spain) Mikel Arce - Signed from CD Lourdes
- (United States) Jay Ayres - Signed from Belmont University
- (United States) Tim Bohnenkamp - Drafted 15th overall in 2008 MLS Supplemental Draft
- (United States) Dan Benton - Signed from Charlotte Eagles
- (United States) Preston Burpo - Trade with CD Chivas USA
- (United States) Joe Cannon - Trade with Los Angeles Galaxy
- (United States) Brian Carroll - Expansion draft pick from D.C. United
- (United States) Ryan Cochrane - Expansion draft pick from Houston Dynamo
- (United States) Ramiro Corrales - Trade with Houston Dynamo for league rights after return from SK Brann
- (England) John Cunliffe - Trade with CD Chivas USA
- (United States) Greg Curry - Drafted 29th overall in 2008 MLS Supplemental Draft
- (United States) Eric Denton - Signed from New York Red Bulls
- (United States) Nick Garcia - Trade with Kansas City Wizards
- (Germany) Michael Ghebru - Signed from Eintracht Frankfurt
- (Turks and Caicos Islands) Gavin Glinton - Expansion draft pick from Los Angeles Galaxy
- (United States) Clarence Goodson - Expansion draft pick from FC Dallas
- (United States) Ned Grabavoy - Expansion draft pick from Columbus Crew
- (United States) Kelly Gray - Trade with Colorado Rapids
- (Honduras) Iván Guerrero - Expansion draft pick from Chicago Fire
- (United States) Michael Gustavson - Signed from Clayton State University
- (United States) Matt Hatzke - Signed from Santa Clara University
- (Puerto Rico) Jason Hernandez - Expansion draft pick from CD Chivas USA
- (England) Darren Huckerby - Trade with Toronto FC for league rights from Norwich City F.C.
- (Haiti) Peguero Jean Philippe - Loan from Brøndby IF
- (United States) Tim Jepson - Drafted 43rd overall in 2008 MLS Supplemental Draft
- (Jamaica) Ryan Johnson - Signed from New Jersey Ironmen
- (Sierra Leone) Kei Kamara - Trade with Columbus Crew
- (United States) Jovan Kirovski - Trade with Colorado Rapids
- (Brazil) Francisco Lima - Signed from Brescia Calcio
- (Republic of Ireland) Ronnie O'Brien - Trade with Toronto FC
- (Canada) Chris Pozniak - Expansion draft pick from Toronto FC
- (United States) James Riley - Expansion draft pick from New England Revolution
- (United States) Jamil Roberts - Trade with FC Dallas
- (United States) Shea Salinas - Drafted 15th overall in 2008 MLS SuperDraft
- (Trinidad and Tobago) Scott Sealy - Trade with Kansas City Wizards
- (Liberia) Adam Smarte - Drafted 1st overall in 2008 MLS Supplemental Draft
- (South Africa) Davide Somma - Signed from Olbia Calcio
- (United States) Joe Vide - Expansion draft pick from New York Red Bulls

=== Out ===
- (United States) Dan Benton - Waived
- (United States) Tim Bohnenkamp - Waived
- (United States) Preston Burpo - Traded to Colorado Rapids
- (United States) Brian Carroll - Traded to Columbus Crew
- (United States) Greg Curry - Waived
- (United States) Clarence Goodson - Signed with IK Start
- (Honduras) Iván Guerrero - Traded to D.C. United
- (Haiti) Peguero Jean Philippe - Canceled loan with Brøndby IF
- (United States) Tim Jepson - Waived
- (Sierra Leone) Kei Kamara - Traded to Houston Dynamo
- (Canada) Chris Pozniak - Traded to CD Chivas USA
- (United States) Joe Vide - Traded to D.C. United

== Toronto FC ==
This is a list of transfers for Toronto FC.

=== In ===
- (Trinidad and Tobago) Julius James Picked 9th overall in the 2008 MLS Superdraft
- (United States) Pat Phelan Picked 10th overall in the 2008 MLS Superdraft
- (United States) Brian Edwards Picked in the 2nd round of the 2008 MLS Superdraft
- (United States) Mike Zaher Picked in the 3rd round of the 2008 MLS Superdraft
- (Republic of Ireland) Joseph Lapira Picked in the 3rd round of the 2008 MLS Superdraft
- (United States) Xavier Balc Picked 2nd overall in 2008 MLS Supplemental Draft
- (Canada) Kevin Harmse Acquired from Los Angeles Galaxy for 2009 MLS Superdraft pick (4th round)
- (Canada) Tyler Rosenlund Signed as a free agent
- (New Zealand) Jarrod Smith Signed as a free agent
- Marco Vélez Free transfer from Puerto Rico Islanders
- (France) Laurent Robert Free transfer from (England) Derby County
- (Honduras) Amado Guevara Traded from Chivas USA for a 2009 and 2010 draft pick
- (England) Rohan Ricketts Free transfer from (England) Barnsley
- (Ivory Coast) Olivier Tébily Free transfer from (England) Birmingham City
- (United States) Abdus Ibrahim Traded from FC Dallas for a 2009 draft pick
- (United States) Chad Barrett Traded from Chicago Fire for Brian McBride
- (United States) Johann Smith "Free transfer from (England) Bolton Wanderers
- (Guatemala) Carlos Ruíz Traded from Los Angeles Galaxy for 2009 MLS Supplementary Draft picks (1st and 2nd rounds)

=== Out ===
- (United States) Maurice Edu transferred to (Scotland) Rangers F.C. for a fee of $5,000,000
- (Canada) Chris Pozniak Lost to San Jose Earthquakes in Expansion Draft
- (Canada) Adam Braz Waived, later signed with Montreal Impact
- (Canada) Miguel Canizalez Waived
- (Canada) Srdjan Djekanovic Waived, later signed with Vancouver Whitecaps
- (Canada) David Guzmán Waived, later signed with Chicago Fire Premier
- (Canada) Stephen Lumley Waived
- (Canada) Cristian Nuñez Waived, later signed with Montreal Impact
- (Canada) Marco Reda Waived, later signed with Charleston Battery
- (Canada) Kenny Stamatopoulos Loan return to (Norway) Tromsø IL
- (United States) Pat Phelan Waived
- (United States) Mike Zaher Waived
- (Republic of Ireland) Joseph Lapira Waived
- (Republic of Ireland) Ronnie O'Brien Traded to San Jose Earthquakes for 2009 MLS Superdraft pick (1st round) and partial allocation
- (New Zealand) Andrew Boyens Waived, signed by New York Red Bulls
- (Jamaica) Jeff Cunningham Traded to FC Dallas for a 2009 MLS Superdraft (3rd Round) pick
- (France) Laurent Robert Waived
- (Ivory Coast) Olivier Tébily Waived
