= 2007 MLS expansion draft =

Player draft for MLS teams

2007 MLS Expansion Draft

General information
- Date: November 21, 2007

Overview
- Expansion team: San Jose Earthquakes
- Expansion season: 2008

The 2007 MLS Expansion Draft was held on November 21, 2007, and is a special draft for the Major League Soccer expansion team San Jose Earthquakes. They made 10 selections from a pool of players from current MLS clubs.

== Format ==
- Only one player may be selected from each team, three of the league's 13 current teams will not have a player selected.
- Teams will be allowed to protect 11 players from their 28-man rosters. Generation adidas players are automatically protected, though players who are graduated from the program to the senior roster at the end of the 2007 season are not.
- Each team may only leave one senior international player unprotected. Players are considered SIs here based on their age for the 2008 season, not the 2007 season.

== Expansion Draft ==
#	Player	Position	Country	Previous club
1	Ryan Cochrane	Defender	United States	Houston Dynamo
2	Clarence Goodson	Defender	United States	FC Dallas
3	Ned Grabavoy	Midfielder	United States	Columbus Crew
4	James Riley	Defender-Midfielder	United States	New England Revolution
5	Joe Vide	Midfielder	United States	New York Red Bulls
6	Iván Guerrero	Midfielder	Honduras	Chicago Fire
7	Brian Carroll	Midfielder	United States	D.C. United
8	Jason Hernandez	Defender	Puerto Rico	Chivas USA
9	Gavin Glinton	Forward	Turks and Caicos Islands	LA Galaxy
10	Chris Pozniak	Defender	Canada	Toronto FC

== Team-by-team breakdown ==
=== C.D. Chivas USA ===
Exposed	Protected	Exempt
David Arvizu	Jonathan Bornstein	
Desmond Brooks	Maykel Galindo	
Bobby Burling	Brad Guzan	
Preston Burpo	Sacha Kljestan	
John Cunliffe	Jesse Marsch	
Jorge Flores	Francisco Mendoza	
Amado Guevara	Paulo Nagamura	
Anthony Hamilton	Ante Razov	
Jason Hernandez	Claudio Suárez	
Carlos Llamosa	Shavar Thomas	
Rodrigo López	Lawson Vaughn	
Laurent Merlin		
Justin Myers		
Ramón Núñez		
Orlando Perez		
Eder Robles		
Erasmo Solorzano		
Alex Zotinca		

=== Chicago Fire ===
Exposed	Protected	Exempt
Jon Busch	Chad Barrett	Bakary Soumaré
Floyd Franks	Cuauhtémoc Blanco	
Mike Banner	C.J. Brown	
Jeff Curtin	Calen Carr	
Jim Curtin	Wilman Conde	
Iván Guerrero	Justin Mapp	
Diego Gutierrez	Logan Pause	
Bruno Menezes	Matt Pickens	
Nick Noble	Dasan Robinson	
Brian Plotkin	Chris Rolfe	
Jordan Russolillo	Gonzalo Segares	
Osei Telesford		
John Thorrington		
Daniel Woolard		

=== Colorado Rapids ===
Exposed	Protected	Exempt
José Cancela	Mehdi Ballouchy	Nico Colaluca
Conor Casey	Colin Clark	
John DiRaimondo	Terry Cooke	
Dan Gargan	Bouna Coundoul	
Jordan Harvey	Omar Cummings	
Nicolas Hernández	Facundo Erpen	
Justin Hughes	Herculez Gomez	
Stephen Keel	Ugo Ihemelu	
Jovan Kirovski	Kosuke Kimura	
Nick LaBrocca	Pablo Mastroeni	
Mike Petke	Jacob Peterson	
Brandon Prideaux		
Tony Sanneh		
Zach Thornton		
Clifton Wilmes		

=== Columbus Crew ===
Exposed	Protected	Exempt
Jason Garey	Brad Evans	Kei Kamara
Bill Gaudette	Eddie Gaven	Robbie Rogers
Ned Grabavoy	Marcos González	Tim Ward
Leonard Griffin	Frankie Hejduk	Jed Zayner
Andy Gruenebaum	Ezra Hendrickson	
Andy Herron	Will Hesmer	
Ben Hunter	Chad Marshall	
Ryan Junge	Alejandro Moreno	
Stefani Miglioranzi	Danny O'Rourke	
Adam Moffat	Duncan Oughton	
Brandon Moss	Guillermo Barros Schelotto	
Andrei Pacheco		
Andrew Peterson		
Rusty Pierce		
Jacob Thomas		
Ricardo Virtuoso		

=== D.C. United ===
Exposed	Protected	Exempt
Nicholas Addlery	Bobby Boswell	Bryan Arguez
Brian Carroll	Marc Burch	
Jeff Carroll	Luciano Emilio	
Shawn Crowe	Fred	
Stephen deRoux	Christian Gómez	
Rod Dyachenko	Devon McTavish	
Joshua Gros	Jaime Moreno	
Guy-Roland Kpene	Bryan Namoff	
Domenic Mediate	Ben Olsen	
Jerson Monteiro	Troy Perkins	
Justin Moose	Clyde Simms	
Mira Mupier		
Jay Nolly		
Brad North		
Greg Vanney		
Jamil Walker		

=== F.C. Dallas ===
Exposed	Protected	Exempt
Juan Sebastián Botero	Arturo Alvarez	Abdus Ibrahim
Andrew Daniels	Ray Burse	Blake Wagner
Michael Dello-Russo	Kenny Cooper	Anthony Wallace
Denílson	Dax McCarty	
Chris Gbandi	Drew Moor	
Sandy Gbandi	Ricardinho	
Clarence Goodson	Pablo Ricchetti	
Scott Jones	Carlos Ruíz	
Roberto Miña	Marcelo Saragosa	
Dominic Oduro	Adrian Serioux	
Aaron Pitchkolan	Juan Toja	
Bobby Rhine		
Darío Sala		
Abe Thompson		
David Wagenfuhr		
Chase Wileman		
Alex Yi		

=== Houston Dynamo ===
Exposed	Protected	Exempt
Corey Ashe	Wade Barrett	Patrick Ianni
Mike Chabala	Brian Ching	
Ryan Cochrane	Ricardo Clark	
Paul Dalglish	Brad Davis	
Eric Ebert	Dwayne De Rosario	
Nick Hatzke	Nate Jaqua	
John Michael Hayden	Stuart Holden	
Kenneth Hoerner	Brian Mullan	
Jordan James	Richard Mulrooney	
Pat Onstad	Joseph Ngwenya	
Erik Ustruck	Eddie Robinson	
Craig Waibel		
Zach Wells		
Chris Wondolowski		
Stephen Wondolowski		

=== Kansas City Wizards ===
Exposed	Protected	Exempt
Jose Burciaga Jr.	Davy Arnaud	
Eloy Colombano	Jimmy Conrad	
Edson Elcock	Nick Garcia	
A. J. Godbolt	Michael Harrington	
Willy Guadarrama	Jack Jewsbury	
Kevin Hartman	Eddie Johnson	
Aaron Hohlbein	Carlos Marinelli	
Will John	Kurt Morsink	
Chris Konopka	Scott Sealy	
Michael Kraus	Sasha Victorine	
Eric Kronberg	Kerry Zavagnin	
Amir Lowery		
Ryan McMahen		
Ryan Pore		
Ryan Raybould		
Tyson Wahl		
Lance Watson		

=== Los Angeles Galaxy ===
Exposed	Protected	Exempt
Steve Cronin	Chris Albright	Quavas Kirk
Mike Caso	David Beckham	Israel Sesay
Lance Friesz	Edson Buddle	
Gavin Glinton	Joe Cannon	
Alan Gordon	Landon Donovan	
Kelly Gray	Ty Harden	
Kevin Harmse	Ante Jazic	
Kyle Martino	Chris Klein	
Clint Mathis	Carlos Pavón	
Josh Tudela	Mike Randolph	
Peter Vagenas	Troy Roberts	
Kyle Veris		
Abel Xavier		

=== New England Revolution ===
Exposed	Protected	Exempt
Bryan Byrne	Adam Cristman	Amaechi Igwe
Andy Dorman	Jay Heaps	
Gary Flood	Shalrie Joseph	
Joe Franchino	Jeff Larentowicz	
Miguel Gonzalez	Pat Noonan	
Kyle Helton	Michael Parkhurst	
Avery John	Steve Ralston	
Brad Knighton	Matt Reis	
Marshall Leonard	Khano Smith	
Chris Loftus	Wells Thompson	
Kenny Mansally	Taylor Twellman	
Sainey Nyassi		
James Riley		
Willie Sims		
Doug Warren		

=== New York Red Bulls ===
Exposed	Protected	Exempt
Sal Caccavale	Jozy Altidore	
Blake Camp	Juan Pablo Ángel	
Danny Cepero	Jon Conway	
Francis Doe	Hunter Freeman	
Kevin Goldthwaite	Dema Kovalenko	
Elie Ikangu	Carlos Mendes	
Chris Karcz	Jeff Parke	
Jerrod Laventure	Claudio Reyna	
Chris Leitch	Dane Richards	
Mike Magee	Seth Stammler	
Randi Patterson	Dave van den Bergh	
Santino Quaranta		
Markus Schopp		
Siniša Ubiparipović		
Joe Vide		
John Wolyniec		

=== Real Salt Lake ===
Exposed	Protected	Exempt
Chris Brown	Kyle Beckerman	Nikolas Besagno
Kyle Brown	Alecko Eskandarian	Yura Movsisyan
Steven Curfman	Fabian Espindola	Chris Seitz
Kenny Cutler	Robbie Findley	
Willis Forko	Atiba Harris	
Duke Hashimoto	Matias Mantilla	
Christian Jimenez	Javier Morales	
Jean-Martial Kipre	Nick Rimando	
Dustin Kirby	Nathan Sturgis	
Ritchie Kotschau	Carey Talley	
Chris Lancos	Chris Wingert	
Kyle Reynish		
Jack Stewart		
Jamie Watson		
Andy Williams		

=== Toronto FC ===
Exposed	Protected	Exempt
Nana Attakora-Gyan	Jim Brennan	
Andrew Boyens	Jeff Cunningham	
Adam Braz	Danny Dichio	
Miguel Cañizález	Todd Dunivant	
Srdjan Djekanovic	Maurice Edu	
Gabe Gala	Tyrone Marshall	
David Guzmán	Ronnie O'Brien	
Tyler Hemming	Carl Robinson	
Andrea Lombardo	Collin Samuel	
Stephen Lumley	Greg Sutton	
Joey Melo	Marvell Wynne	
Christian Núñez		
Chris Pozniak		
Marco Reda		
Kyriakos Stamatopoulos		
