= Jamil Roberts =

Jamil Roberts can refer to:

- Jamil Roberts (soccer, born 1986), American soccer midfielder
- Jamil Roberts (footballer, born 1998), English football forward
