= Argenis Fernández =

Costa Rican footballer (born 1987)

Personal information
- Full name: Argenis Alberto Fernández Zapata
- Date of birth: April 3, 1987 (age 39)
- Place of birth: Ciudad Neily, Costa Rica
- Height: 1.69 m (5 ft 7 in)
- Position: Forward

Youth career
- 2004–2005: Santos de Guápiles

Senior career*
Years	Team	Apps	(Gls)
2006–2008	Santos de Guápiles	7	(1)
2008–2009	New England Revolution	2	(0)
2008	→ Alajuelense (loan)	11	(1)
2009–2012	Alajuelense	70	(10)
2012-2013	Real Pococí	-	(-)
2013–2015	Santos de Guápiles	100	(7)
2015	Cariari Pococí	-	(-)
2015-2016	Cobán Imperial	17	(4)
2016	Municipal Liberia	12	(1)
2017-2020	Cariari Pococí	-	(-)

International career^{‡}
2007	Costa Rica U-20	2	(0)
2010	Costa Rica	2	(0)
- * Club domestic league appearances and goals as of 7 January 2020 ‡ National team caps and goals as of 9 june 2010

Argenis Alberto Fernández Zapata (born April 3, 1987) is a former Costa Rican footballer.

== Career ==
=== Club ===
Fernández began his career with Santos de Guápiles in the Primera División de Costa Rica, graduating from the youth system to the senior team in 2006.

He was signed by New England Revolution in March 2008 (reportedly for a fee of $300,000, although other reports claim the amount was less). He made his Revolution debut on April 12, 2008, coming on as a half-time substitute in the match against Colorado Rapids. Fernández played in one more game as a substitute before being loaned back to Alajuelense for the remainder of the 2008 Major League Soccer season. He subsequently participated in three different competitions during his time with Alajuelense, making 12 total appearances in the Torneo de Invierno 2008, the Copa Centroamericana and the CONCACAF Champions League.

Fernández was waived by Revolution on April 7, 2009, to make room on the roster for Emmanuel Osei.

He was released by Alajuelense at the end of the 2011–12 season and he had a short spell at amateur league side Real Lemusa whom he joined in October 2012. He only returned to the Primera Division de Costa Rica after 8 months without a club in 2013 when he rejoined Santos de Guápiles.

=== International ===
Fernández played for Costa Rica in the 2007 FIFA U-20 World Cup held in Canada, where he made two appearances for the Ticos.

He made his senior debut for Costa Rica in a January 2010 friendly match against Argentina and has, as of May 2014, earned a total of 2 caps, scoring no goals.
