= Chris Pozniak =

Canadian soccer player

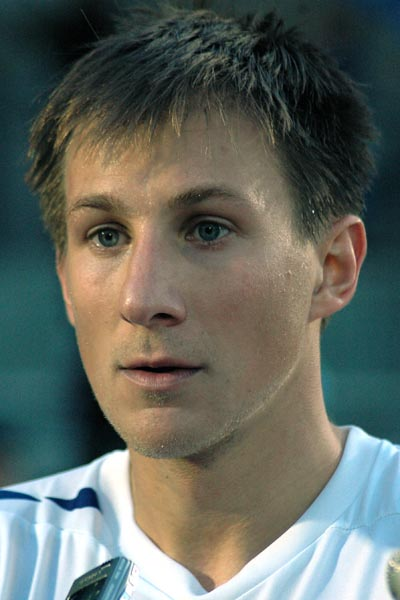
- Pozniak in 2008

Personal information
- Full name: Krzysztof Poźniak
- Date of birth: 10 January 1981 (age 45)
- Place of birth: Kraków, Poland
- Height: 5 ft 11 in (1.80 m)
- Position: Defender

Youth career
- 1994–1995: Scarborough Azzurri Blues

Senior career*
Years	Team	Apps	(Gls)
1999–2001	Toronto Lynx	42	(0)
2001–2004	Örebro	45	(1)
2004–2006	Haugesund	47	(9)
2007	Toronto FC	22	(0)
2008	Chivas USA	4	(0)
2008	Vancouver Whitecaps	7	(1)
2008–2009	Dundee	24	(1)
2009–2010	Vancouver Whitecaps	9	(0)
2010–2012	Haugesund	54	(2)
2012	→ Bryne (loan)	8	(0)
Total		262	(14)

International career^{‡}
1998–2001	Canada U20	17	(0)
2002–2004	Canada U-23	18	(4)
2002–2009	Canada	24	(0)

Managerial career
- 2015: K-W United FC
- 2016–2023: Toronto FC II (assistant)
Medal record
Representing Canada
Men's football
CONCACAF Gold Cup
Third place	2002 United States
- * Club domestic league appearances and goals as of 00:15, 20 December 2012 (UTC) ‡ National team caps and goals as of 00:15, 20 December 2012 (UTC)

Krzysztof "Chris" Pozniak (born 10 January 1981) is a Canadian retired footballer.

== Club career ==
Pozniak emigrated from Poland with his parents Tadeusz and Elżbieta, and sister Kinga, to Canada in 1990. He is able to speak Polish.

He began his professional career with the Toronto Lynx at age 18. Poźniak has since played for FK Haugesund of the Norwegian Second division and Örebro SK of the Allsvenskan in Sweden.

On 22 November 2006, Toronto FC manager Mo Johnston announced the signings of Pozniak along with fellow Canadians Adam Braz and Marco Reda for TFC's inaugural season. In his first year at TFC, Pozniak featured in the defense and midfield acting as a backup and occasional starter.

On 21 November 2007, Pozniak was selected tenth by the San Jose Earthquakes in the 2007 MLS Expansion Draft. On 28 March 2008 he was traded to CD Chivas USA for John Cunliffe. In May 2008 he moved to Vancouver Whitecaps. He was released in July with a link to Europe.

Pozniak signed a one-year deal with Dundee on 7 August 2008 and left the club on 29 June 2009. At Dundee he scored once against Queen of the South.

On 30 July 2009, the Whitecaps announced that they had signed him for a second spell at the club. The deal lasted until the end of the season, and had an option for 2010, which was not picked up.

On 12 December 2012, it was revealed that FK Haugesund had released him from his contract with the club and the player was moving into retirement.

== International career ==
Pozniak has been capped by Canada at the U20, U23, and senior levels. He competed in the 2001 FIFA World Youth Championship in Argentina. His first senior cap for Canada came in the 2002 CONCACAF Gold Cup against Haiti as a late game substitute. He has since earned a total of 24 caps, scoring no goals, and become an important contributing member for Canada's squad. He has represented Canada in 3 FIFA World Cup qualification matches.

== Coaching career ==
On 29 April 2015, K-W United FC announced that Chris Pozniak would be the team's new head coach. He would lead United to an 11-2-1 season and the PDL playoffs. In the playoffs, United would beat the Des Moines Menace, Michigan Bucks, Seattle Sounders U23 and New York Red Bulls U23's to claim the PDL North American Championship. Pozniak is currently an assistant coach of Toronto FC II.

== Career stats ==
Club performance			League		Cup		League Cup		Total	
Season	Club	League	Apps	Goals	Apps	Goals	Apps	Goals	Apps	Goals
Canada			League		Voyageurs Cup		League Cup		Total	
1999	Toronto Lynx	A-League			—		—			
2000	Toronto Lynx	A-League			—		—			
2001	Toronto Lynx	A-League			—		—			
Sweden			League		Svenska Cupen		League Cup		Total	
2001	Örebro	Allsvenskan	4	0	0	0	—		4	0
2002	Örebro	Allsvenskan	23	1	0	0	—		23	1
2003	Örebro	Allsvenskan	18	0	0	0	—		18	0
2004	Örebro	Allsvenskan					—			
Norway			League		Norwegian Cup		League Cup		Total	
2004	FK Haugesund	Adeccoligaen	22	5	0	0	—		22	5
2005	FK Haugesund	Adeccoligaen	0	0	0	0	—		0	0
2006	FK Haugesund	Adeccoligaen	25	4	1	1	—|26		5	
Canada			League		Voyageurs Cup		League Cup		Total	
2007	Toronto FC	Major League Soccer	22	0	—		—		22	0
USA			League		Open Cup		League Cup		Total	
2008	Chivas USA	Major League Soccer	4	0	0	0	—		4	0
Canada			League		Voyageurs Cup		League Cup		Total	
2008	Vancouver Whitecaps	First Division	7	1	2	0	—		9	1
Scotland			League		Scottish Cup		League Cup		Total	
2008–09	Dundee F.C.	First Division	26	1	1	0	0	0	27	1
Canada			League		Voyageurs Cup		League Cup		Total	
2009	Vancouver Whitecaps	First Division					—			
2010	Vancouver Whitecaps	USSF Division 2					—			
Norway			League		Norwegian Cup		League Cup		Total	
2010	Haugesund	Tippeligaen	28	1	4	0	—		32	1
2011	Haugesund	Tippeligaen	25	1	3	0	—		28	1
2012	Haugesund	Tippeligaen	1	0	1	0	—		2	0
2012	Bryne	Adeccoligaen	8	0	0	0	—		8	0
Country	Canada		71	1	2	0	—		73	1
Country	Sweden		45	1			—		45	1
Country	Norway		109	11	9	1	—		118	12
Country	United States		4	0	0	0	—		4	0
Country	Scotland		26	1	1	0	0	0	27	1
Career total			255	14	12	1	0	0	267	15

== Honours ==
Canada

- CONCACAF Gold Cup: 3rd place, 2002
