= Tony Beltran =

American soccer player

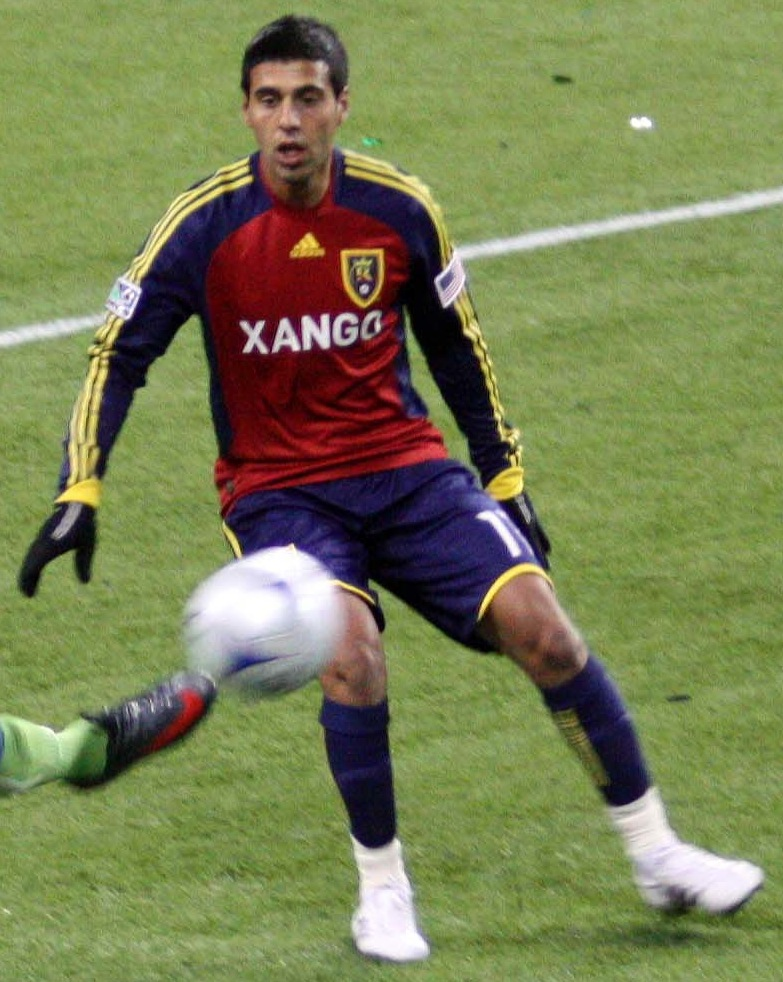

Personal information
- Full name: Anthony Benjamin Beltran
- Date of birth: October 11, 1987 (age 39)
- Place of birth: Claremont, California, United States
- Height: 5 ft 7 in (1.70 m)
- Position: Right back

Youth career
- 2005: St. John's Red Storm
- 2006–2007: UCLA Bruins

Senior career*
| Years | Team | Apps | (Gls) |
| 2007 | Los Angeles Storm | 3 | (0) |
| 2008–2019 | Real Salt Lake | 245 | (1) |
| 2017 | → Real Monarchs (loan) | 1 | (0) |
| Total | | 249 | (1) |

International career^{‡}
| 2007 | United States U20 | 5 | (0) |
| 2008 | United States U23 | 2 | (0) |
| 2013–2014 | United States | 3 | (0) |
Medal record
Representing United States
| Winner | CONCACAF Gold Cup | 2013 |
Men's Soccer
- * Club domestic league appearances and goals as of November 4, 2018 ‡ National team caps and goals as of April 3, 2014

Anthony Benjamin Beltran (born October 11, 1987) is an American former soccer player who spent nearly all of his entire professional career at Real Salt Lake.

== Career ==
=== Youth career ===
Beltran was a two-time Parade All American at Claremont High School. He was also named in the 2004 NSCAA/Adidas High School All-America squad and was a member of the Region IV Olympic Development Program from 2002 to 2005 and captain of the 2004 squad.

=== College ===
Tony Beltran began college playing as forward for St. John's Red Storm playing 21 matches with 10 starts, scoring 2 goals and three assists. For his Sophomore year he transferred to UCLA to play for UCLA Bruins. In his Sophomore year he overcame an early season ankle injury to make 14 appearances He played for two years at UCLA and started all 21 matches of his Junior year and played all but four minutes of the season as right full back and defensive midfielder.

=== Professional ===
Tony Beltran was selected third in the overall 2008 MLS SuperDraft and made his official Major League Soccer debut on April 12, 2008, against D.C. United. He started 10 of his 15 appearances in his rookie year.

Due to chronic knee issues, Beltran announced his retirement from professional soccer on September 13, 2019.

=== International ===
Born in the United States, Beltran is of Mexican descent. Beltran was the starter for the U-18 team that won the 2005 Milk Cup, started in all five matches in the 2007 FIFA U-20 World Cup with the USMNT progressing to quarter finals. He also made two appearances for the U-23 team in the 2008 Toulon Tournament. He was named to the January 2013 training camp for the U.S. national team and made his debut in a 0–0 friendly against Canada at BBVA Compass Stadium.

== Career statistics ==
=== Club ===
As of December 14, 2014.

Appearances and goals by club, season and competition
| Club | Season | League | | | Open Cup | | MLS Cup | | CONCACAF | | Total | |
| Club | Season | Division | Apps | Goals | Apps | Goals | Apps | Goals | Apps | Goals | Apps | Goals |
|---|---|---|---|---|---|---|---|---|---|---|---|---|
| Real Salt Lake | 2008 | Major League Soccer | 15 | 0 | 0 | 0 | 0 | 0 | 0 | 0 | 15 | 0 |
| Real Salt Lake | 2009 | Major League Soccer | 23 | 0 | 0 | 0 | 1 | 0 | 0 | 0 | 24 | 0 |
| Real Salt Lake | 2010 | Major League Soccer | 18 | 0 | 0 | 0 | 1 | 0 | 3 | 0 | 22 | 0 |
| Real Salt Lake | 2011 | Major League Soccer | 22 | 0 | 2 | 1 | 2 | 0 | 4 | 0 | 30 | 1 |
| Real Salt Lake | 2012 | Major League Soccer | 32 | 0 | 0 | 0 | 2 | 0 | 0 | 0 | 34 | 0 |
| Real Salt Lake | 2013 | Major League Soccer | 25 | 0 | 4 | 1 | 5 | 0 | 0 | 0 | 34 | 1 |
| Real Salt Lake | 2014 | Major League Soccer | 29 | 0 | 0 | 0 | 2 | 0 | 0 | 0 | 31 | 0 |
| Real Salt Lake | 2015 | Major League Soccer | 31 | 0 | 0 | 0 | 0 | 0 | 0 | 0 | 31 | 0 |
| Real Salt Lake | 2016 | Major League Soccer | 29 | 0 | 0 | 0 | 0 | 0 | 0 | 0 | 29 | 0 |
| Real Salt Lake | 2017 | Major League Soccer | 21 | 1 | 0 | 0 | 0 | 0 | 0 | 0 | 21 | 1 |
| Real Salt Lake | 2018 | Major League Soccer | 0 | 0 | 0 | 0 | 0 | 0 | 0 | 0 | 0 | 0 |
| Real Salt Lake | 2019 | Major League Soccer | 0 | 0 | 0 | 0 | 0 | 0 | 0 | 0 | 0 | 0 |
| Career total | | | 245 | 1 | 6 | 2 | 13 | 0 | 7 | 0 | 245 | 3 |

=== International ===
Appearances and goals by national team and year
| National team | Year | Apps | Goals |
|---|---|---|---|
| United States | 2013 | 2 | 0 |
| United States | 2014 | 1 | 0 |
| Total | | 3 | 0 |

== Honors ==
=== Real Salt Lake ===
- Major League Soccer Western Conference Championship (1): 2013
- Major League Soccer Eastern Conference Championship (1): 2009
- Major League Soccer MLS Cup (1): 2009

=== Individual ===
- MLS All-Star (2): 2013, 2015
