= Ryan Cochrane (soccer) =

Retired American soccer player

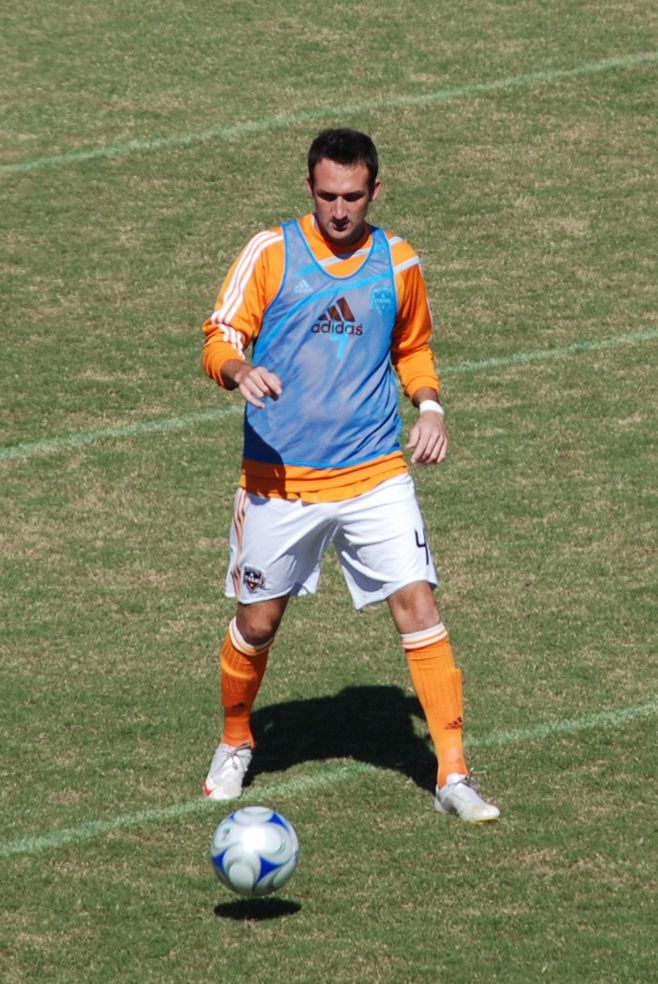

Personal information
- Full name: Ryan Cochrane
- Date of birth: August 8, 1983 (age 43)
- Place of birth: Portland, Oregon, United States
- Height: 6 ft 1 in (1.85 m)
- Position: Defender

Youth career
- 2001–2003: Santa Clara Broncos

Senior career*
Years	Team	Apps	(Gls)
2004–2005	San Jose Earthquakes	32	(0)
2006–2007	Houston Dynamo	52	(2)
2008–2009	San Jose Earthquakes	21	(2)
2009–2010	Houston Dynamo	18	(0)
2011	New England Revolution	22	(1)
2012	San Antonio Scorpions	26	(1)
Total		171	(6)

International career^{‡}
2002–2003	United States U20	22	(1)
- * Club domestic league appearances and goals as of October 4, 2012 ‡ National team caps and goals as of October 4, 2010

Ryan Cochrane (born August 8, 1983) is an American former professional soccer player.

== Career ==
=== Youth and college ===
Cochrane attended La Salle High School near Portland, Oregon and played three years of college soccer at Santa Clara University, from 2001 to 2003. In his final year, Cochrane was named a second-team All American, and was a Hermann Trophy semifinalist.

=== Professional ===
Following his junior season, Cochrane signed a Project-40 contract with Major League Soccer, and entered the 2004 MLS SuperDraft, where he was selected 5th overall by San Jose Earthquakes. In his first year, Cochrane finished the year with 18 starts and 1459 minutes. Along with the rest of his Earthquakes teammates, he moved to Houston for the 2006 season.

After the 2007 season, Cochrane returned to San Jose to play for a newly formed 2008 expansion side, also named Earthquakes. Houston accommodated his request and left him exposed in the November 2007 MLS Expansion Draft where San Jose made him the first selection. He scored the deciding goal in the 90th minute for San Jose Earthquakes on August 3, 2008, against Los Angeles Galaxy in a match that would end 3-2 for San Jose.

Less than two years after leaving Houston, Cochrane was traded back to Dynamo on August 14, 2009, in exchange for an international roster slot through the 2010 season.

After the 2010 MLS season Houston declined Cochrane's contract option and he elected to participate in the 2010 MLS Re-Entry Draft. On December 15, 2010, Cochrane was selected by New England Revolution in Stage 2 of the Re-Entry draft.

Cochrane spent the 2011 season with New England. At season's end, the club declined his 2012 contract option and he entered the 2011 MLS Re-Entry Draft. Cochrane was not selected in the draft and became a free agent. On February 2, 2012, Cochrane signed with the expansion San Antonio Scorpions of the North American Soccer League.

After one season with San Antonio, Cochrane announced his retirement on December 28, 2012.

=== International ===
Cochrane has played for the U-18 and U-20 United States national soccer teams. With Chad Marshall, he anchored the defense of the U-20 team at the 2003 FIFA World Youth Championship.

== Honors ==
=== San Jose Earthquakes ===
- Major League Soccer Supporters' Shield (1): 2005

=== Houston Dynamo ===
- Major League Soccer MLS Cup (2): 2006, 2007
- Major League Soccer Western Conference Championship (2): 2006, 2007
