= Jamil Roberts (soccer, born 1986) =

American soccer player

Personal information
- Date of birth: March 4, 1986 (age 40)
- Place of birth: Fremont, California United States
- Height: 6 ft 0 in (1.83 m)
- Position: Defender

Youth career
- Fremont Lazio

College career
Years	Team	Apps	(Gls)
2004–2007	Santa Clara Broncos	80	(5)

Senior career*
Years	Team	Apps	(Gls)
2008–2009	San Jose Earthquakes	1	(0)
Total		1	(0)

International career
2005	United States U17	4	(0)
- * Club domestic league appearances and goals

Jamil Roberts (born March 4, 1986) is an American former soccer player who played as a defender. He played one match for the San Jose Earthquakes in 2008.

== Club career ==
=== Youth and college ===
Roberts attended Washington High School in Fremont, California (where his coach was Johnny Kinnear, brother of Dominic Kinnear) and played college soccer at Santa Clara University, where he played in 80 games and scored five goals. He was named WCC Defensive Player of the Year in 2007, and was named to the All-WCC First Team, the NSCAA All-Far West Region First Team and the College Soccer News All-American Third Team. He also played club soccer for local team Fremont Lazio.

=== San Jose Earthquakes ===
On January 18, 2008, Roberts was drafted with the 45th overall pick by FC Dallas in the 2008 MLS SuperDraft. However, on April 3, 2008, Roberts signed with the San Jose Earthquakes after the club acquired his rights from FC Dallas in exchange for a third round pick in the 2009 Supplemental Draft. Throughout the 2008 season, Roberts mainly played with the reserves in the MLS Reserve League. On June 14, 2008, Roberts made his professional debut for the Earthquakes against the Los Angeles Galaxy, coming on as a second-half substitute.

== International career ==
As a youth, Roberts played 90 minutes for the United States U17 team in wins over Brazil, Serbia and Montenegro and Northern Ireland in the elite group of the 2005 Milk Cup.

== Personal ==
He is the younger brother of fellow professional soccer player Troy Roberts.
