= Andrew Boyens =

Former New Zealand footballer

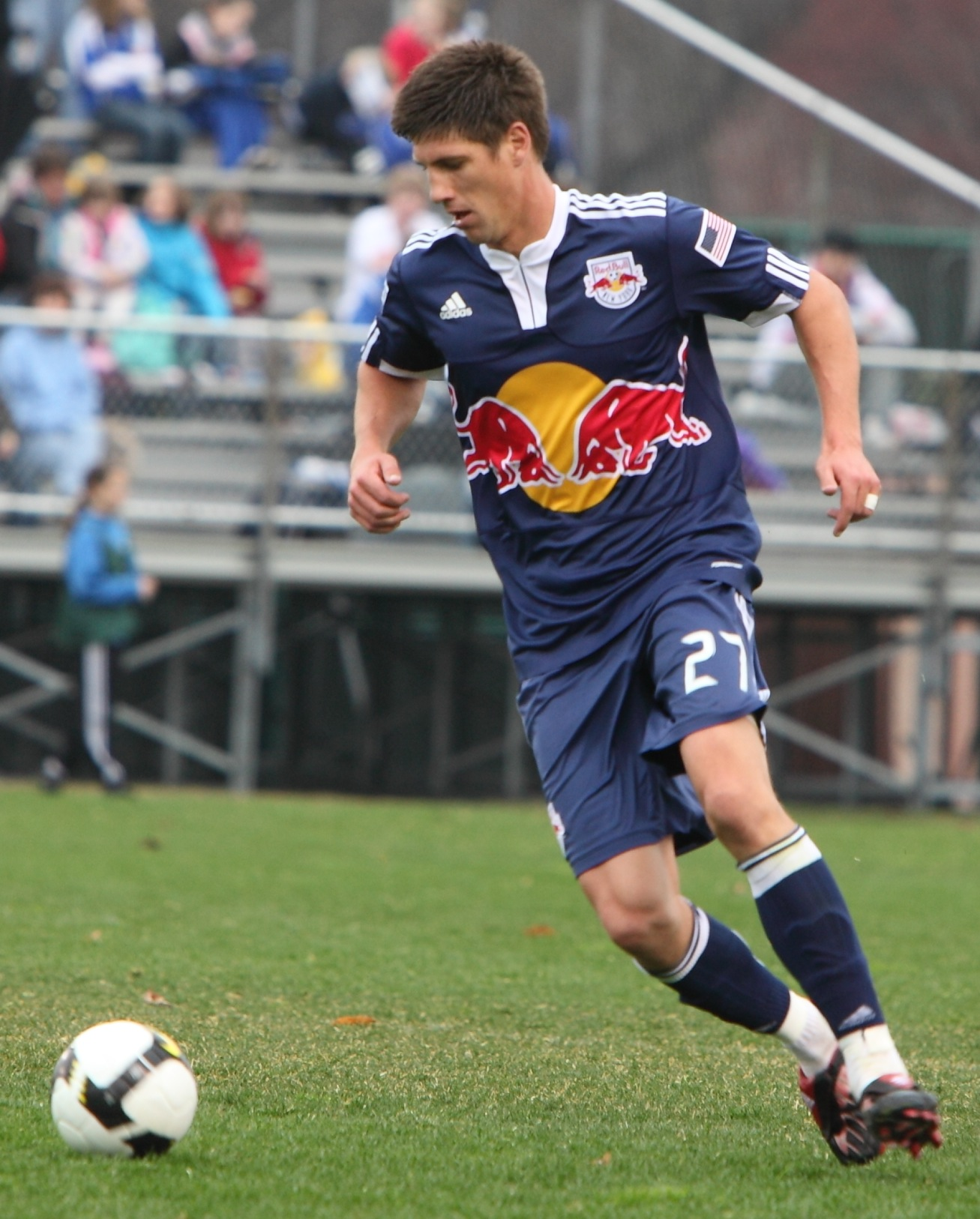
- Boyens with New York Red Bulls

Personal information
- Full name: Andrew Victor Boyens
- Date of birth: 18 September 1983 (age 43)
- Place of birth: Napier, New Zealand
- Height: 1.93 m (6 ft 4 in)
- Position: Centre-back

Team information
- Current team: New Zealand (Technical director)

Youth career
- 2002: University of Otago
- 2004–2006: New Mexico Lobos

Senior career*
Years	Team	Apps	(Gls)
2002–2003	Dunedin Technical	14	(2)
2006–2007	Otago United	17	(1)
2007–2008	Toronto FC	23	(1)
2008–2010	New York Red Bulls	33	(0)
2011	Chivas USA	12	(1)
2012	Los Angeles Galaxy	2	(0)
2013–2014	Forrest Hill Milford		
2014–2015	Waitakere United		
2015–2016	Forrest Hill Milford		

International career^{‡}
2002–2003	New Zealand U20	4	(1)
- New Zealand U23
2007–2011	New Zealand	19	(0)

Managerial career
- 2018-: New Zealand (Technical director)
- * Club domestic league appearances and goals as of 15 August 2015 ‡ National team caps and goals as of 20 October 2011

Andrew Victor Boyens is a New Zealand former footballer who played as a centre-back and is the technical director for New Zealand. Boyens has represented New Zealand at the international level.

== Career ==
=== College ===
Boyens spent his childhood in Napier where he was born on 18 September 1983 and moved to Dunedin at age 16. He was educated at Kavanagh College and the University of Otago, completing a BA in 2004. He started his playing career in New Zealand, playing for University of Otago and semi-professional club Dunedin Technical before transferring to University of New Mexico in 2004, where he was named a first-team All-American in 2006.

=== Professional ===
After briefly playing for Otago United in the New Zealand Football Championship, Boyens was drafted in the first round of the 2007 MLS SuperDraft by Toronto FC. He scored his first MLS goal off a corner in a 2–1 win over the Colorado Rapids on 2 June 2007. He was released by Toronto FC on 14 April 2008.

Boyens went on trial at New York Red Bulls in April 2008, and signed with the team on 5 May 2008. He appeared in 19 matches during the MLS regular season. After an up and down season Boyens' solid play in central defence helped Red Bulls pull off a surprising first-round upset in the MLS playoffs, defeating defending champion Houston Dynamo 4–1 on aggregate.

After appearing in 41 official matches for the club in three years, New York Red Bulls announced that Boyens would not be part of their plans for the 2011 MLS season. He signed with Chivas USA on 9 February 2011. At season's end, Chivas USA declined his 2012 contract option and he entered the 2011 MLS Re-Entry Draft. Boyens was selected by Los Angeles Galaxy in stage 2 of the draft on 12 December 2011. He signed with Los Angeles on 30 January 2012.

After the conclusion of the 2012 season, LA declined the 2013 option on Boyens's contract and he entered the 2012 MLS Re-Entry Draft. Boyens went undrafted in both rounds of the draft.

==== Return to New Zealand ====
Following a stint as a head coach within the LA Galaxy Youth Academy, Boyens returned to New Zealand football in February 2014 when he was named as the new Football Development Officer for the Waitakere region. He began playing with amateur club Forrest Hill Milford, where he also serves as assistant coach. Boyens resumed his professional career when he signed with New Zealand side Waitakere United on 20 October 2014. Waitakere cut ties with Boyens following the 2014–15 season.

=== International ===
Boyens was included in the New Zealand squad for a series of matches against Malaysia in February 2006, but did not play in any of them. He made his national team debut in an unofficial friendly later that year, when he came on as a substitute during New Zealand's 5–1 loss to Spanish club Sevilla FC on 15 August.

Boyens' first official international appearance came in May 2007, when New Zealand drew with Wales 2–2. The Observer noted that the defensive back two pairing of Boyens and Ben Sigmund were "boasting 10 minutes international experience between them".

He was named in the 2009 FIFA Confederations Cup New Zealand squad, and gifted David Villa Spain's fifth goal when he "air shot" a routine clearance during Spain's 5–0 rout over New Zealand on Sunday 14 June.

On 10 May 2010, Boyens was named in New Zealand's final 23-man squad to compete at the 2010 FIFA World Cup.

== Club career statistics ==
All-Time Club Performances
Club	Season	MLS		Playoffs		Open Cup		CONCACAF		Total
Club	Season	App	Goals	App	Goals	App	Goals	App	Goals	App	Goals
Toronto FC (MLS)	2007	23	1	0	0	0	0	0	0	23	1
Toronto FC (MLS)	Club Total	23	1	0	0	0	0	0	0	23	1
Club	Season	MLS		Playoffs		Open Cup		CONCACAF		Total
Club	Season	App	Goals	App	Goals	App	Goals	App	Goals	App	Goals
New York Red Bulls (MLS)	2008	19	0	2	0	1	0	0	0	22	0
New York Red Bulls (MLS)	2009	14	0	0	0	2	0	0	0	16	0
New York Red Bulls (MLS)	2010	0	0	0	0	3	0	0	0	3	0
New York Red Bulls (MLS)	Club Total	33	0	2	0	6	0	0	0	41	0
Club	Season	MLS		Playoffs		Open Cup		CONCACAF		Total
Club	Season	App	Goals	App	Goals	App	Goals	App	Goals	App	Goals
Chivas USA (MLS)	2011	12	1	0	0	1	0	0	0	13	1
Chivas USA (MLS)	Club Total	12	1	0	0	1	0	0	0	13	1
Career totals		68	2	2	0	7	0	0	0	77	2
Last updated 7 November 2011

== Honors ==
=== New York Red Bulls ===
- Major League Soccer Western Conference Championship (1): 2008

== See also ==
- New Zealand men's national football team
- New Zealand at the FIFA World Cup
- New Zealand national football team results
- List of New Zealand international footballers
