= Ned Grabavoy =

American soccer player

Personal information
- Full name: Ned Grabavoy
- Date of birth: July 1, 1983 (age 43)
- Place of birth: Joliet, Illinois, United States
- Height: 5 ft 7 in (1.70 m)
- Position: Midfielder

College career
Years	Team	Apps	(Gls)
2001–2003	Indiana Hoosiers		

Senior career*
Years	Team	Apps	(Gls)
2003	Chicago Fire Premier	15	(8)
2004–2006	Los Angeles Galaxy	34	(1)
2006–2007	Columbus Crew	36	(4)
2008	San Jose Earthquakes	24	(0)
2009–2014	Real Salt Lake	159	(10)
2015	New York City FC	27	(2)
2016	Portland Timbers	22	(0)
Total		316	(25)

International career
2003	United States U20	4	(0)
- * Club domestic league appearances and goals as of 22:27, 23 October 2016 (UTC)~

Ned Grabavoy (born July 1, 1983) is an American former professional soccer player who played as a midfielder. He is the general manager for the Portland Timbers.

== Career ==
=== Youth and college ===
Grabavoy played his youth soccer with the Chicago Magic Soccer Club under coach Mike Matkovich from U12 through U19. Grabavoy's U16 Chicago Magic team was credited with winning the Chicago Magic Soccer Clubs first National Youth Soccer Club Association Championship in 1999. Grabavoy attended Lincoln-Way Central High School where Grabavoy received in 1998 and 1999 an All-American Award by the National Soccer Coaches Association and led the Knights to two straight Illinois State Class AA Championship games. Grabavoy was the recipient of the Gatorade 2000-01 National High School Player of the Year Awarded and named the NHSCA National Senior Athlete of the Year award. Grabavoy played three years of college soccer for Indiana University Hoosiers men's soccer under legendary coach Jerry Yeagley. Grabavoy was a unanimous All Big-10 and US All-American selection as a sophomore and was voted an NCAA First Team All-American as a junior. Grabavoy led Indiana University to a 2003 Men's NCAA Championship title his third year.

=== Professional ===
Grabavoy played for coach Mike Matkovich with the Chicago Fire Reserves in the Premier Development League and signed a Project-40 contract with MLS, and was subsequently selected 14th overall in the 2004 MLS SuperDraft by the Los Angeles Galaxy and Coach Sigi Schmid. In his first year with the Galaxy, Grabavoy played 928 minutes, registering a goal and three assists. He added three assists in his second season, while fighting for playing time as LA won the 2005 MLS Cup and U.S. Open Cup. In May 2006, Grabavoy was traded to the Crew in a four-player deal where he was reunited with Coach Sigi Schmidt.

Grabavoy was selected by the San Jose Earthquakes in the 2007 MLS Expansion Draft. He was waived by the club on March 3, 2009, but was picked up by Real Salt Lake in the Waiver Draft later that same day. Grabavoy scored the winning penalty kick on November 14, 2009, at Chicago Fire to give Real Salt Lake their first conference championship and first trip to the MLS Cup final. In 2009, Real Salt Lake beat Los Angeles Galaxy in the final for its first Major League Soccer championship. He scored his first Real Salt Lake goal on May 29, 2010, against the Kansas City Wizards at Rio Tinto Stadium, the fourth goal in a 4-1 RSL victory.

In January 2012, RSL signed Grabavoy to a contract extension through the 2013 season. The following month the contract was extended an additional year through 2014.

On December 10, 2014, Grabavoy was selected second overall by New York City FC in the 2014 MLS Expansion Draft. In 2015, Grabavoy played for New York City FC rejoining Coach Jason Kreis whom he had played for at Real Salt Lake from 2009 though 2013.

In 2016, Grabavoy was part of the first Major League Soccer "free agent class." Grabavoy signed with Portland Timbers on January 12, 2016.

On October 18, 2016, Grabavoy announced his retirement effective at the end of the 2016 season. He was named as director of scouting and recruitment for the Portland Timbers (Major League Soccer) in December 2016.

=== International ===
Grabavoy has also had a significant role with United States national youth teams from U14 through U18, including the U-20 team, which he played for in the FIFA World Youth Championship in the United Arab Emirates and more recently the U-23 team. Grabavoy had offers to live and train in Holland at 13 years of age, Germany (Stuttgart) at 16 and AC Monaco at 19.

=== Front office career ===
Grabavoy currently works in the Portland Timbers front office as the club's General Manager having previously served as the club's technical director. On October 5, 2022, upon the firing of Gavin Wilkinson from the team as a result of the fallout from the 2021 NWSL abuse scandal, Grabavoy was tabbed to direct soccer operations.

== Honors ==
=== Los Angeles Galaxy ===
- Major League Soccer MLS Cup (1): 2005

=== Real Salt Lake ===
- Major League Soccer MLS Cup (1): 2009
- Major League Soccer Eastern Conference Championship (1): 2009
- Major League Soccer Western Conference Championship (1): 2013
