= Oscar Echeverry =

Colombian footballer (born 1977)

Oscár Echeverry
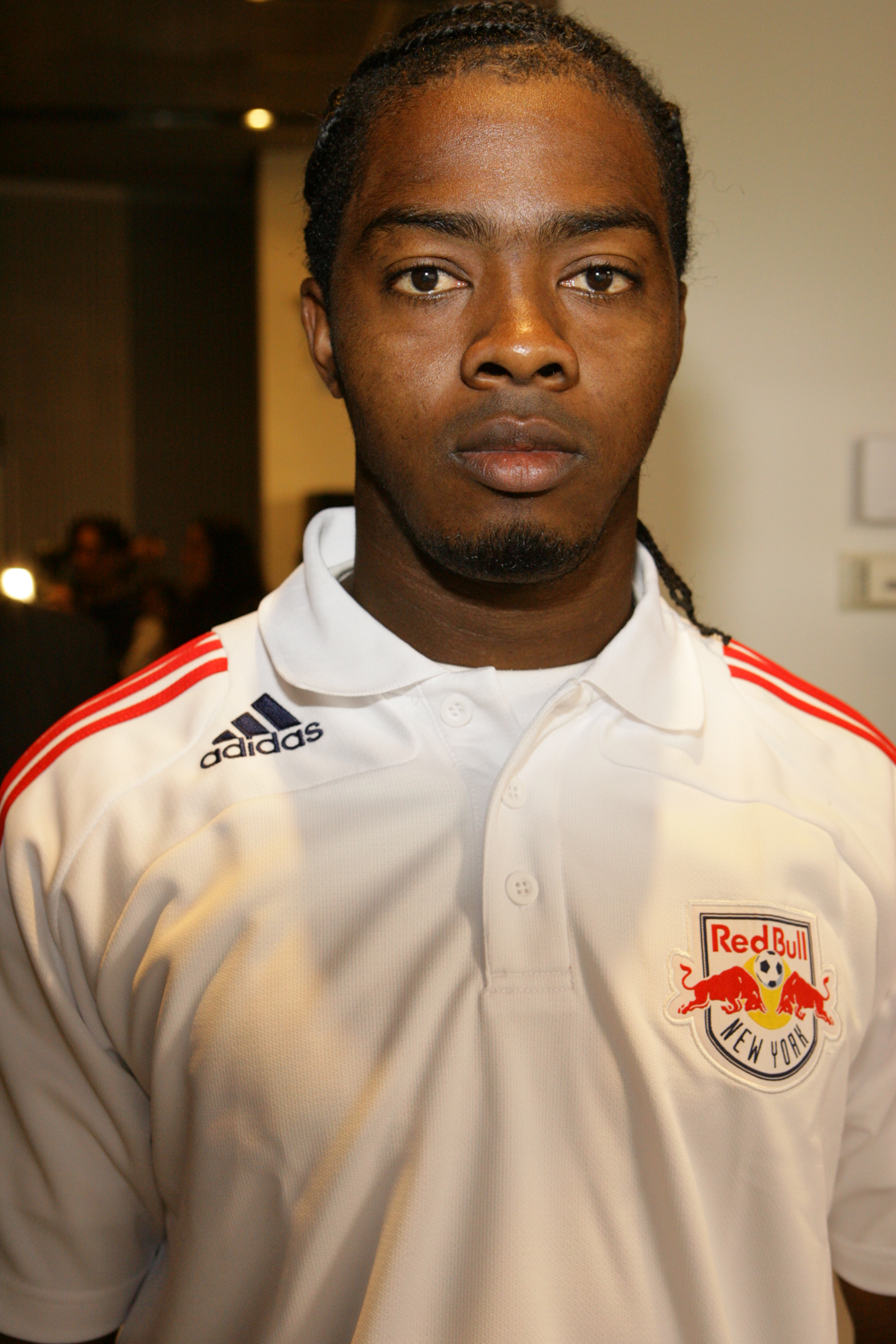

Personal information
- Full name: Oscár Marino Echeverry Lourido
- Date of birth: January 13, 1977 (age 49)
- Place of birth: Cali, Colombia
- Height: 5 ft 10 in (1.78 m)
- Position: Forward

Youth career
- Deportivo Cali

Senior career*
Years	Team	Apps	(Gls)
1996–1998	Deportivo Cali		(0)
1998–1999	→ Deportivo Pasto (loan)	38	(9)
2000	Deportivo Cali		(2)
2001	→ Once Caldas (loan)	30	(2)
2002	→ Deportivo Pereira (loan)		(1)
2003	→ Deportivo Pasto (loan)		(2)
2003	BSC Young Boys U-21	10	(1)
2003–2004	→ Caracas FC (loan)	20	(5)
2004– 2007	Atlético Nacional	48	(5)
2008–2009	New York Red Bulls	9	(0)
- * Club domestic league appearances and goals as of 11 July 2008

Oscár Marino Echeverry Lourido (born January 13, 1977) is a Colombian football forward, who last played for New York Red Bulls of Major League Soccer.

== Club career ==
Echeverry made his debut in the Colombian First Division in 1996 with Deportivo Cali. He remained at the club two years before joining upstart Deportivo Pasto. While at Pasto he helped the club gain promotion to the Colombian First Division. In 1999 with Deportivo Fasto, Echeverry enjoyed his finest season netting 9 goals in 38 appearances. He would than go on to play for Once Caldas, Deportivo Pereira, BSC Young Boys in Switzerland and Venezuelan side Caracas FC. While at Caracas FC he won a league title and participated in the Copa Libertadores. He also scored the 1,000th goal for Caracas FC in the Venezuelan First division on September 25, 2003.

In 2004, Echeverry joined Colombian power Atlético Nacional. While at Nacional he helped the club to numerous titles. Echeverry cemented his claim as a big game player on June 19, 2005 scoring both goals in a 2–1 victory over his former club Deportivo Cali helping Nacional reach the 2005 Colombian Apertura Final. On June 26, 2005 Oscar helped the Medellín club celebrate the eighth title in its history as he scored the second goal in a 2–0 victory over Santa Fe in the second leg of the final of the 2005 Torneo Apertura. In total Oscar Echeverry has appeared in 203 Colombian First Division matches in which he has scored 27 goals.

After being sought out by various Colombian sides during the 2008 offseason, including Millonarios and Cúcuta Deportivo, Echeverry signed with New York Red Bulls of Major League Soccer. Echeverry appeared in nine league matches for New York but did not impress due to injury problems. His season was cut short due to a knee injury that did not properly heal. His best moment with the club was when he scored for Red Bulls on June 25, 2008 in a 1–0 exhibition win over Chivas de Guadalajara in Glendale, Arizona. He was released by New York in April 2009.

== International ==
Echeverry represented Colombia at the under 23 level.

== Honours ==
Deportivo Pasto

- Primera B Colombia: 1998

Caracas FC

- Venezuelan First Division Title: 2004

Atlético Nacional

- Torneo Apertura Colombiano: 2005, 2007
- Torneo Clausura Colombiano: 2007
