= Jean-Martial Kipré =

Ivorian footballer

Personal information
- Date of birth: 10 November 1984 (age 42)
- Place of birth: Adjamé, Ivory Coast
- Height: 1.75 m (5 ft 9 in)
- Position: Defender

Youth career
- 1995–2004: Paris Saint-Germain

Senior career*
Years	Team	Apps	(Gls)
2002–2004	Paris Saint-Germain B	34	(0)
2004–2006	Angers	39	(0)
2007	Real Salt Lake	18	(0)
2008–2011	Toulon	26	(0)
2011–2012	Moulins	22	(0)
2011–2014	Yzeure	40	(0)
2014–2017	Lyon Duchère	62	(1)
2017–2018	CS Louhans-Cuiseaux	21	(0)
Total		262	(1)
- * Club domestic league appearances and goals

Jean-Martial Kipré (born 10 November 1984) is an Ivorian former professional footballer who played as a defender.

== Career ==
Kipré was born in Adjamé, Ivory Coast. He joined Real Salt Lake in 2007, after spending nine years with the French club Paris Saint-Germain and two years with the French club Angers SCO. He was waived at the end of the 2007 season, and moved later to SC Toulon.

== Sources ==
- Jean-Martial Kipré at Soccerway (archived)
- Jean-Martial Kipré at L'Équipe Football (in French)
- Real Salt Lake Player Registry
- Biography at mls.net
