= Justin Myers =

American soccer player (born 1985)

Personal information
- Full name: Justin Myers
- Date of birth: January 15, 1985 (age 41)
- Place of birth: Phoenix, Arizona, United States
- Height: 6 ft 2 in (1.88 m)
- Position: Goalkeeper

College career
Years	Team	Apps	(Gls)
2003–2005	California Golden Bears		

Senior career*
Years	Team	Apps	(Gls)
2006	San Diego Gauchos	11	(0)
2007	Chivas USA	0	(0)
2008–2009	Puerto Rico Islanders	3	(0)
2008	→ Sevilla FC Puerto Rico (loan)	2	(0)
2009	→ Bayamon FC (loan)		
2010–2011	Hòa Phát Hà Nội		
2011–2013	San Diego Flash		
- * Club domestic league appearances and goals as of 22 November 2021

Justin Myers (born January 15, 1985, in Phoenix, Arizona) is an American retired soccer player.

== Career ==
=== College and amateur ===
Myers grew up in San Diego, CA, attended Torrey Pines High School, and played three years as goalie at University of California, Berkeley.

=== Professional ===
Myers was signed by Chivas USA of Major League Soccer in 2007 as a backup goalkeeper, but never made a first team appearance for the side and was waived at the end of the season.

In 2008 Myers was signed by the Puerto Rico Islanders of the USL First Division, and was subsequently sent on loan to Sevilla FC Puerto Rico following the Islanders regular reserve keeper, Michael Behonick, recovery from a leg injury. In September 2008 he returned to the Islanders squad after the Behonick suffered a hand injury, and he would go on and play his first match for the squad on September 21, 2008, the last match of the 2008 regular season.

Myers has since also spent time on loan with another Puerto Rico Soccer League side, Bayamon FC.

== Honors ==
=== Club ===
Puerto Rico Islanders

- USL First Division Championship runners-up: 2008
- Commissioner's Cup: 2008
- CFU Club Championship runner-up: 2009
