= Miguel Gonzalez (soccer, born 1987) =

American soccer player

Personal information
- Full name: Miguel Antonio González Castelan
- Date of birth: September 25, 1987 (age 39)
- Place of birth: Miami, Florida, United States
- Height: 5 ft 8 in (1.73 m)
- Position: Midfielder

Youth career
- 2004–2005: Santos Laguna

Senior career*
Years	Team	Apps	(Gls)
2005–2006	Bradenton Academics	11	(2)
2006–2007	New England Revolution	0	(0)
2007	→ New Hampshire Phantoms (loan)	5	(0)
2008	Atlante F.C.	0	(0)
2008	→ Atlante II (loan)	4	(0)
2008	→ Potros Chetumal (loan)		
2009	Bradenton Academics	2	(0)
2010–2011	Correcaminos UAT	0	(0)

International career^{‡}
2006–2007	United States U20	4	(2)
- * Club domestic league appearances and goals as of June 19, 2011 ‡ National team caps and goals as of March 7, 2007

Miguel Antonio González Castelan (Spanish: González; born September 25, 1987) is an American former soccer player of Mexican descent.

== Career ==
=== Youth and amateur ===
Gonzalez spent two years in the Santos Laguna youth system, before joining the Bradenton Academy in 2006, subsequently playing two seasons for the Bradenton Academics in the USL Premier Development League.

=== Professional ===
Gonzalez became the youngest player on the New England Revolution when he was signed to a developmental contract on July 20, 2006. Having failed to make a break into the Revolution first team, Gonzalez was loaned out USL Second Division side New Hampshire Phantoms, and made his debut for them on 23 June 2007. He was waived by New England at the end of the year, having never made a Major League Soccer appearance.

Gonzalez spent 2008 playing for Potros Chetumal, the minor-league affiliate of Primera División de México side Atlante. He re-signed for his first club, Bradenton Academics of the USL Premier Development League, for the 2009 season. Later he joined Mexican side Correcaminos UAT, but never played a match for them.
