= Elie Ikangu =

French footballer (born 1986)

Personal information
- Date of birth: October 4, 1986 (age 40)
- Place of birth: Paris, France
- Height: 5 ft 7 in (1.70 m)
- Position: Midfielder

Youth career
- ????–2005: Le Havre AC
- 2005–2006: Darlington

Senior career*
Years	Team	Apps	(Gls)
2006–2007	New York Red Bulls	3	(0)
- * Club domestic league appearances and goals as of February 16, 2008

Elie Ikangu (born October 4, 1986) is a football midfielder who played for New York Red Bulls of Major League Soccer.

Ikangu played with the youth team at French team Le Havre AC. He joined English Football League Two (fourth tier) club Darlington in 2005, but was released in January 2006 having failed to progress from the youth team. He played on trial for the reserve team of Premier League club Middlesbrough, then moved to the United States, where, after a preseason trial, he signed a developmental contract with New York Red Bulls in 2006. He was let go by the team in February 2008. He is of Congolese descent.
