= Joe Vide =

American soccer player

Personal information
- Date of birth: May 16, 1984 (age 42)
- Place of birth: Fort Worth, Texas, United States
- Height: 5 ft 10 in (1.78 m)
- Position: Midfielder

Youth career
- 1999–2002: TSV Munich 1860
- 2002–2005: Virginia Cavaliers

Senior career*
Years	Team	Apps	(Gls)
2004	Richmond Kickers Future	2	(0)
2006–2007	New York Red Bulls	23	(0)
2008	San Jose Earthquakes	5	(0)
2008	D.C. United	5	(1)
- * Club domestic league appearances and goals as of 3 August 2008

Joe Vide (born May 16, 1984, in Fort Worth, Texas) is an American soccer player.

== Career ==
=== Amateur ===
Vide attended high school while playing for TSV Munich 1860's youth team in Munich, Germany. He played four years at the University of Virginia as a defensive midfielder and became a regular for the Cavaliers by his senior year. In 2004, he spent the collegiate off season with the Richmond Kickers Future in the USL Premier Development League.

=== Professional ===
Vide was selected fifth overall in the 2006 MLS Supplemental Draft by MetroStars. He made his MLS debut July 4, 2006 as a substitute against Los Angeles Galaxy. He would go on to appear in 7 matches for the re-branded New York Red Bulls during the season, including two starts.

After not featuring in the clubs plans during the early part of the 2007 campaign, Vide began to receive significant playing time earning 16 appearances and 13 starts due to injuries to first team midfielders Claudio Reyna and Dema Kovalenko. He also made his playoff debut against New England Revolution on November 3, playing 77 minutes. His tenacious play and ability on the ball in the center of the field was a revelation and quickly established Vide as a fan favorite.

On November 21, 2007, he was selected by San Jose Earthquakes in the 2007 MLS Expansion Draft. He was waived on July 14, 2008.

On July 16, 2008, he was claimed by D.C. United. He scored his first MLS goal for United against Colorado on August 23. Despite solid performances for D.C., he was waived by the club in February 2009.

== Personal life ==
In April 2010, Joe Vide was diagnosed with Stage 3 Hodgkin's Lymphoma.

== Honors ==
Elected to the Capital Area Soccer League (CASL) Hall of Fame in 2012

=== D.C. United ===
- Lamar Hunt U.S. Open Cup (1): 2008
