= Chris Loftus =

American soccer player and coach

Personal information
- Full name: Christopher Loftus
- Date of birth: October 20, 1984 (age 42)
- Place of birth: Springfield, IL, United States
- Height: 6 ft 5 in (1.96 m)
- Position: Forward

Youth career
- Metro FC
- 2003–2006: Duke

Senior career*
Years	Team	Apps	(Gls)
2005–2006	Raleigh Elite	13	(2)
2007	New England Revolution	0	(0)
2007	→ New Hampshire Phantoms (loan)	3	(0)
2008–2009	IF Limhamn Bunkeflo	28	(8)
- * Club domestic league appearances and goals as of 22 February 2008

Christopher Loftus (born October 20, 1984), is an American former soccer player.

== Playing career ==
=== College level ===
Loftus played four years of college soccer for Duke, scoring 24 goals in 80 appearances, and in the USL Premier Development League for Raleigh Elite.

=== Draft ===
He was drafted by the Revolution in the third round of the 2007 MLS Supplemental Draft and signed a developmental contract.

Having failed to make a break into the first team, Loftus was loaned out USL Second Division side New Hampshire Phantoms, making three appearances for the team. His only appearance for the Revolution came in one game in the US Open Cup. He was waived by New England after the 2007 season. He signed with Swedish second division side IF Limhamn Bunkeflo in February 2008.

== Coaching career ==
By December 2010, he was working as assistant coach for the Evansville Purple Aces.
