= Jeff Curtin =

American soccer player

Personal information
- Full name: Jeff Curtin
- Date of birth: July 4, 1983 (age 43)
- Place of birth: Oreland, Pennsylvania, United States
- Height: 6 ft 3 in (1.91 m)
- Position: Defender

Team information
- Current team: D.C. United
- Number: 3

Youth career
- 2002–2005: Georgetown
- 1996–1999: Philadelphia Soccer Club Coppa

Senior career*
Years	Team	Apps	(Gls)
2006–2007	Chicago Fire	3	(1)
2008	D.C. United	0	(0)
- * Club domestic league appearances and goals as of 25 May 2008 ‡ National team caps and goals as of 3 June 2006

Jeff Curtin (born July 4, 1983) is an American retired soccer player, who last played for D.C. United of Major League Soccer.

Jeff played college soccer at Georgetown University, where he finished with 12 goals and 7 assists in 73 matches. He was named All Big East Second Team for four consecutive years (2002–05). He was drafted in the 2nd round, 14th overall, by the Chicago Fire in the 2006 MLS SuperDraft; he subsequently played 3 times for Fire, scoring one goal, before being claimed in the waiver draft by D.C. United on March 4, 2008. On May 23, 2008, D.C. United announced that Jeff Curtin was retiring after a sequence of injuries and expected rehabilitation.

He is the younger brother of his former teammate with the Fire, defender Jim Curtin, who later played with Chivas USA.
