= 2008 Major League Soccer season =

13th season of Major League Soccer

Major League Soccer
- Season: 2008
- Teams: 14
- MLS Cup: Columbus Crew (1st title)
- Supporters' Shield: Columbus Crew (2nd shield)
- Champions League: Columbus Crew; New York Red Bulls; Houston Dynamo; D.C. United
- SuperLiga: Chicago Fire; N.E. Revolution; Chivas USA; Kansas City Wizards
- Matches: 210
- Goals: 591 (2.81 per match)
- Top goalscorer: Landon Donovan; Los Angeles Galaxy; Goals: 20
- Biggest home win: COL 4–0 LA; CHI 4–0 NE; RSL 4–0 DCU
- Biggest away win: FCD 1–5 LA; NY 1–5 CHI
- Highest scoring: NY 4–5 COL
- Longest winning run: 5 games: Columbus Crew
- Longest unbeaten run: 9 games: Columbus Crew; San Jose Earthquakes
- Longest losing run: 4 games: D.C. United
- Highest attendance: LA @ NY: 46,754
- Lowest attendance: CLB @ CHV: 6,733
- Total attendance: 3,461,013
- Average attendance: 16,481

Locations of teams for the 2008 Major League Soccer season
Western Conference Eastern Conference

The 2008 Major League Soccer season was the 13th season of Major League Soccer. It was also the 96th season of FIFA-sanctioned soccer in the United States, and the 30th with a national first-division league.

The San Jose Earthquakes returned to the league, following a two-year hiatus that began after the 2005 season.

The Kansas City Wizards left Arrowhead Stadium and moved to the Kansas side of the metropolitan area, occupying CommunityAmerica Ballpark in Kansas City. The league also debuted its newest soccer-specific stadium in October when Real Salt Lake opened Rio Tinto Stadium in Sandy, Utah.

The regular season began on March 29, and concluded on October 26. The 2008 MLS Cup Playoffs began on October 30, and concluded with MLS Cup 2008 on November 23. The Columbus Crew captured the league double by winning their second Supporters' Shield and by defeating the New York Red Bulls, 3-1, in MLS Cup.

== Overview ==
=== Season format ===
The season began on March 29 and concluded with MLS Cup on November 23. The 14 teams were split evenly into two conferences. Each team played 30 games that were evenly divided between home and away. Each team played every other team twice, home and away, for a total of 26 games. The remaining four games were played against four regional rivals, two at home and two away.

The top three teams from each conference automatically qualified for the MLS Cup Playoffs. In addition, the two highest remaining point totals, regardless of conference, also qualified. In the first round, aggregate goals over two matches determined the winners. The conference finals were played as a single match, and the winners advanced to MLS Cup. In all rounds, draws were broken with two 15-minute periods of extra time, followed by penalty kicks if necessary. The away goals rule was not used in any round.

The team with the most points in the regular season was awarded the MLS Supporters' Shield and qualified for the CONCACAF Champions League. Additionally, the winner of MLS Cup, and the runner-up, also qualified for the CONCACAF Champions League. An additional berth in the Champions League was also awarded to the winner of the U.S. Open Cup. If a team qualified for multiple berths into the Champions League, then additional berths were awarded to the highest overall finishing MLS team(s) not already qualified. Also, Toronto FC, as a Canadian-based team, could not qualify for the CONCACAF Champions League through MLS, and had to instead qualify through the Canadian Championship.

Automatic qualification for the U.S. Open Cup was awarded to the top six overall finishers, as opposed to the top three finishers in each conference. The rest of the U.S.-based MLS teams had to qualify for the remaining two berths via a series of play-in games.

Due to fixture congestion, qualification for the SuperLiga was limited to the top four overall finishers not already qualified for the CONCACAF Champions League. This applied retroactively to the 2008 season, and thus was related to qualification for MLS teams to SuperLiga 2009.

=== Stadiums and locations ===
| Team | Stadium | Capacity |
|---|---|---|
| Chicago Fire | Toyota Park | 20,000 |
| Chivas USA | Home Depot Center | 27,000 |
| Colorado Rapids | Dick's Sporting Goods Park | 18,061 |
| Columbus Crew | Columbus Crew Stadium | 22,555 |
| D.C. United | RFK Stadium | 46,000 |
| FC Dallas | Pizza Hut Park | 21,193 |
| Houston Dynamo | Robertson Stadium | 32,000 |
| Kansas City Wizards | CommunityAmerica Ballpark | 10,385 |
| LA Galaxy | Home Depot Center | 27,000 |
| New England Revolution | Gillette Stadium | 68,756 |
| New York Red Bulls | Giants Stadium | 80,200 |
| Real Salt Lake | Rice-Eccles Stadium; Rio Tinto Stadium | 45,017; 20,213 |
| San Jose Earthquakes | Buck Shaw Stadium | 10,525 |
| Toronto FC | BMO Field | 21,566 |

=== Personnel and sponsorships ===
| Team | Head coach | Captain | Shirt sponsor |
|---|---|---|---|
| Chicago Fire | (Costa Rica) Denis Hamlett | | Best Buy |
| Chivas USA | (United States) Preki | | Comex |
| Colorado Rapids | (United States) Fernando Clavijo | | — |
| Columbus Crew | (United States) Sigi Schmid | (United States) Frankie Hejduk | Glidden |
| D.C. United | (United States) Tom Soehn | | Volkswagen |
| FC Dallas | (Northern Ireland) Steve Morrow | | — |
| Houston Dynamo | (United States) Dominic Kinnear | (United States) Wade Barrett | — |
| Kansas City Wizards | (United States) Curt Onalfo | | — |
| LA Galaxy | (Netherlands) Ruud Gullit | | Herbalife |
| New England Revolution | (Scotland) Steve Nicol | | — |
| New York Red Bulls | (Colombia) Juan Carlos Osorio | (Colombia) Juan Pablo Ángel | Red Bull |
| Real Salt Lake | (United States) Jason Kreis | (United States) Kyle Beckerman | — |
| San Jose Earthquakes | (Canada) Frank Yallop | (United States) Nick Garcia | — |
| Toronto FC | (England) John Carver | | — |

=== Coaching changes ===
| Team | Outgoing coach | Manner of departure | Date of vacancy | Incoming coach | Date of appointment |
|---|---|---|---|---|---|
| FC Dallas | (Northern Ireland) Steve Morrow | Fired | May 20, 2008 | (United States) Marco Ferruzzi | May 20, 2008 |
| FC Dallas | (United States) Marco Ferruzzi | End of interim period | June 16, 2008 | (United States) Schellas Hyndman | June 16, 2008 |

== Results table ==
Abbreviation and Color Key: Chicago Fire - CHI • Chivas USA - CHV • Colorado Rapids - COL • Columbus Crew - CLB • D.C. United - DC FC Dallas - DAL • Houston Dynamo - HOU • Kansas City Wizards - KC • Los Angeles Galaxy - LA • New England Revolution - NE New York Red Bulls - NY • Real Salt Lake - RSL • San Jose Earthquakes - SJ • Toronto FC - TOR Win • Loss • Tie • Home
| Club | Match | | | | | | | | | | | | | | | | | | | | | | | | | | | | | |
| Club | 1 | 2 | 3 | 4 | 5 | 6 | 7 | 8 | 9 | 10 | 11 | 12 | 13 | 14 | 15 | 16 | 17 | 18 | 19 | 20 | 21 | 22 | 23 | 24 | 25 | 26 | 27 | 28 | 29 | 30 |
|---|---|---|---|---|---|---|---|---|---|---|---|---|---|---|---|---|---|---|---|---|---|---|---|---|---|---|---|---|---|---|
| Chicago Fire | RSL | NE | SJ | KC | COL | NE | DC | HOU | NY | DC | DAL | CHV | SJ | CLB | TOR | RSL | KC | CHV | NE | DC | LA | HOU | NY | COL | DAL | LA | KC | CLB | TOR | NY |
| Chicago Fire | 1-1 | 0-4 | 1-0 | 1-0 | 1-2 | 3-0 | 2-0 | 2-1 | 5-1 | 2-1 | 0-1 | 0-2 | 0-0 | 2-2 | 1-2 | 0-0 | 0-0 | 0-1 | 2-1 | 1-0 | 1-0 | 1-2 | 0-1 | 0-2 | 4-1 | 1-3 | 1-1 | 2-2 | 2-3 | 2-5 |
| Chivas USA | DAL | RSL | CLB | DAL | LA | HOU | NE | DC | COL | CLB | NY | RSL | CHI | NY | SJ | LA | CHI | KC | LA | HOU | SJ | TOR | TOR | NE | RSL | KC | DC | SJ | COL | HOU |
| Chivas USA | 1-1 | 1-3 | 3-4 | 2-0 | 2-5 | 0-0 | 2-1 | 1-3 | 2-1 | 0-2 | 0-1 | 1-0 | 0-2 | 1-1 | 0-1 | 1-1 | 0-1 | 2-3 | 2-2 | 0-4 | 0-0 | 1-2 | 3-1 | 0-4 | 1-0 | 1-2 | 3-0 | 1-0 | 2-1 | 1-1 |
| Colorado Rapids | LA | KC | NE | SJ | CHI | DC | HOU | RSL | CHV | DAL | LA | TOR | HOU | CLB | NY | SJ | DAL | CLB | TOR | KC | DC | RSL | DAL | CHI | NE | NY | HOU | LA | CHV | RSL |
| Colorado Rapids | 0-4 | 2-3 | 1-0 | 2-0 | 1-2 | 0-2 | 1-2 | 0-2 | 2-1 | 1-2 | 2-3 | 1-3 | 0-0 | 1-2 | 0-4 | 1-1 | 2-2 | 2-0 | 0-1 | 1-2 | 0-3 | 0-2 | 1-0 | 0-2 | 1-1 | 5-4 | 3-1 | 2-3 | 2-1 | 1-1 |
| Columbus Crew | TOR | NY | CHV | DC | HOU | KC | SJ | TOR | NE | CHV | SJ | KC | LA | COL | CHI | RSL | KC | COL | HOU | DAL | RSL | DAL | NE | TOR | NY | NE | LA | CHI | NY | DC |
| Columbus Crew | 0-2 | 0-2 | 3-4 | 2-1 | 0-1 | 1-2 | 3-2 | 0-0 | 1-0 | 0-2 | 2-0 | 3-0 | 3-3 | 1-2 | 2-2 | 0-2 | 3-3 | 2-0 | 0-2 | 1-2 | 0-3 | 2-1 | 0-4 | 1-1 | 1-3 | 1-0 | 0-1 | 2-2 | 1-3 | 0-1 |
| D.C. United | KC | TOR | RSL | CLB | RSL | COL | CHI | CHV | TOR | TOR | NE | CHI | NY | SJ | LA | HOU | KC | NY | CHI | NE | COL | NY | SJ | DAL | LA | DAL | CHV | HOU | NE | CLB |
| D.C. United | 0-2 | 1-4 | 0-4 | 2-1 | 1-4 | 0-2 | 2-0 | 1-3 | 0-1 | 2-3 | 2-2 | 2-1 | 1-4 | 1-3 | 1-4 | 2-0 | 0-2 | 4-1 | 1-0 | 1-2 | 0-3 | 0-0 | 1-2 | 2-2 | 2-5 | 0-3 | 3-0 | 0-0 | 1-2 | 0-1 |
| FC Dallas | CHV | HOU | NY | CHV | NE | SJ | RSL | LA | RSL | HOU | COL | NE | CHI | NY | HOU | KC | COL | LA | TOR | CLB | KC | CLB | COL | DC | CHI | DC | SJ | TOR | RSL | LA |
| FC Dallas | 1-1 | 3-3 | 0-2 | 2-0 | 1-0 | 0-0 | 1-2 | 5-1 | 1-2 | 2-2 | 1-2 | 1-2 | 0-1 | 0-1 | 1-1 | 1-1 | 2-2 | 0-4 | 2-0 | 1-2 | 1-1 | 2-1 | 1-0 | 2-2 | 4-1 | 0-3 | 1-1 | 2-2 | 1-3 | 2-2 |
| Houston Dynamo | NE | DAL | KC | LA | CLB | CHV | COL | CHI | SJ | DAL | NY | TOR | NE | COL | DAL | RSL | DC | CLB | RSL | CHV | NY | CHI | KC | SJ | TOR | COL | DC | SJ | LA | CHV |
| Houston Dynamo | 0-3 | 3-3 | 0-0 | 2-2 | 0-1 | 0-0 | 1-2 | 2-1 | 1-2 | 2-2 | 0-1 | 1-3 | 2-0 | 0-0 | 1-1 | 0-0 | 2-0 | 0-2 | 3-4 | 0-4 | 0-3 | 1-2 | 1-3 | 1-1 | 1-1 | 3-1 | 0-0 | 1-2 | 0-3 | 1-1 |
| Kansas City Wizards | DC | COL | NE | HOU | CHI | TOR | CLB | NY | LA | RSL | CLB | TOR | RSL | DAL | NY | CLB | CHI | DC | CHV | COL | DAL | SJ | HOU | LA | TOR | CHV | CHI | NE | SJ | NE |
| Kansas City Wizards | 0-2 | 2-3 | 3-1 | 0-0 | 1-0 | 0-2 | 1-2 | 1-1 | 1-3 | 0-0 | 3-0 | 0-0 | 0-1 | 1-1 | 1-2 | 3-3 | 0-0 | 0-2 | 2-3 | 1-2 | 1-1 | 1-2 | 1-3 | 0-2 | 0-2 | 1-2 | 1-1 | 0-1 | 2-3 | 3-1 |
| Los Angeles Galaxy | COL | SJ | TOR | HOU | CHV | RSL | NY | DAL | KC | TOR | COL | SJ | CLB | DC | NE | CHV | NY | DAL | SJ | CHV | CHI | NE | RSL | KC | DC | CHI | CLB | COL | HOU | DAL |
| Los Angeles Galaxy | 0-4 | 0-2 | 3-2 | 2-2 | 2-5 | 2-2 | 2-1 | 5-1 | 1-3 | 0-2 | 2-3 | 3-0 | 3-3 | 1-4 | 2-1 | 1-1 | 2-2 | 0-4 | 2-3 | 2-2 | 1-0 | 2-2 | 2-2 | 0-2 | 2-5 | 1-3 | 0-1 | 2-3 | 0-3 | 2-2 |
| New England Revolution | HOU | CHI | KC | COL | NY | DAL | CHI | CHV | SJ | CLB | DC | DAL | HOU | NY | RSL | TOR | LA | CHI | SJ | DC | TOR | LA | CLB | CHV | COL | CLB | RSL | KC | DC | KC |
| New England Revolution | 0-3 | 0-4 | 3-1 | 1-0 | 1-1 | 1-0 | 3-0 | 2-1 | 0-2 | 1-0 | 2-2 | 1-2 | 2-0 | 1-1 | 1-2 | 1-2 | 2-1 | 2-1 | 0-4 | 1-2 | 1-1 | 2-2 | 0-4 | 0-4 | 1-1 | 1-0 | 2-2 | 0-1 | 1-2 | 3-1 |
| New York Red Bulls | CLB | DAL | NE | SJ | TOR | LA | KC | CHI | HOU | CHV | DC | NE | DAL | CHV | COL | KC | LA | SJ | DC | TOR | HOU | DC | CHI | RSL | CLB | COL | TOR | RSL | CLB | CHI |
| New York Red Bulls | 0-2 | 0-2 | 1-1 | 0-2 | 1-1 | 2-1 | 1-1 | 5-1 | 0-1 | 0-1 | 1-4 | 1-1 | 0-1 | 1-1 | 0-4 | 1-2 | 2-2 | 1-1 | 4-1 | 0-2 | 0-3 | 0-0 | 0-1 | 1-2 | 1-3 | 5-4 | 3-1 | 1-1 | 1-3 | 2-5 |
| Real Salt Lake | CHI | CHV | DC | TOR | DC | LA | DAL | COL | DAL | SJ | KC | CHV | SJ | NE | KC | HOU | CLB | CHI | TOR | HOU | CLB | COL | LA | NY | CHV | SJ | NE | NY | DAL | COL |
| Real Salt Lake | 1-1 | 1-3 | 0-4 | 0-1 | 1-4 | 2-2 | 1-2 | 0-2 | 1-2 | 1-3 | 0-0 | 1-0 | 0-0 | 1-2 | 0-1 | 0-0 | 0-2 | 0-0 | 1-2 | 3-4 | 0-3 | 0-2 | 2-2 | 1-2 | 1-0 | 3-2 | 2-2 | 1-1 | 1-3 | 1-1 |
| San Jose Earthquakes | LA | CHI | COL | NY | DAL | CLB | NE | HOU | RSL | CLB | LA | RSL | DC | CHI | CHV | COL | TOR | NY | LA | NE | CHV | KC | DC | HOU | RSL | DAL | CHV | HOU | KC | TOR |
| San Jose Earthquakes | 0-2 | 1-0 | 2-0 | 0-2 | 0-0 | 3-2 | 0-2 | 1-2 | 1-3 | 2-0 | 3-0 | 0-0 | 1-3 | 0-0 | 1-0 | 1-1 | 0-0 | 1-1 | 2-3 | 0-4 | 0-0 | 1-2 | 1-2 | 1-1 | 3-2 | 1-1 | 1-0 | 1-2 | 2-3 | 0-2 |
| Toronto FC | CLB | DC | LA | RSL | KC | NY | CLB | DC | DC | LA | HOU | COL | KC | NE | CHI | SJ | RSL | DAL | COL | NY | NE | CHV | CHV | CLB | KC | HOU | NY | DAL | CHI | SJ |
| Toronto FC | 0-2 | 1-4 | 3-2 | 0-1 | 0-2 | 1-1 | 0-0 | 0-1 | 2-3 | 0-2 | 1-3 | 1-3 | 0-0 | 1-2 | 1-2 | 0-0 | 1-2 | 2-0 | 1-0 | 0-2 | 1-1 | 1-2 | 3-1 | 1-1 | 0-2 | 1-1 | 3-1 | 2-2 | 2-3 | 0-2 |

== Standings ==
=== Eastern Conference ===
| Pos | Team | Pld | W | L | T | GF | GA | GD | Pts | Qualification |
|---|---|---|---|---|---|---|---|---|---|---|
| 1 | Columbus Crew | 30 | 17 | 7 | 6 | 50 | 36 | +14 | 57 | Qualification for the conference semifinals |
| 2 | Chicago Fire | 30 | 13 | 10 | 7 | 44 | 33 | +11 | 46 | Qualification for the conference semifinals |
| 3 | New England Revolution | 30 | 12 | 11 | 7 | 40 | 43 | −3 | 43 | Qualification for the conference semifinals |
| 4 | Kansas City Wizards | 30 | 11 | 10 | 9 | 37 | 39 | −2 | 42 | Qualification for the conference semifinals |
| 5 | New York Red Bulls | 30 | 10 | 11 | 9 | 42 | 48 | −6 | 39 | Qualification for the conference semifinals |
| 6 | D.C. United | 30 | 11 | 15 | 4 | 43 | 51 | −8 | 37 | |
| 7 | Toronto FC | 30 | 9 | 13 | 8 | 34 | 43 | −9 | 35 | |

Source: MLS

=== Western Conference ===
| Pos | Team | Pld | W | L | T | GF | GA | GD | Pts | Qualification |
|---|---|---|---|---|---|---|---|---|---|---|
| 1 | Houston Dynamo | 30 | 13 | 5 | 12 | 45 | 32 | +13 | 51 | Qualification for the conference semifinals |
| 2 | Chivas USA | 30 | 12 | 11 | 7 | 40 | 41 | −1 | 43 | Qualification for the conference semifinals |
| 3 | Real Salt Lake | 30 | 10 | 10 | 10 | 40 | 39 | +1 | 40 | Qualification for the conference semifinals |
| 4 | Colorado Rapids | 30 | 11 | 14 | 5 | 44 | 45 | −1 | 38 | |
| 5 | FC Dallas | 30 | 8 | 10 | 12 | 45 | 41 | +4 | 36 | |
| 6 | LA Galaxy | 30 | 8 | 13 | 9 | 55 | 62 | −7 | 33 | |
| 7 | San Jose Earthquakes | 30 | 8 | 13 | 9 | 32 | 38 | −6 | 33 | |

Source: MLS

=== Overall standings ===
| Pos | Team | Pld | W | L | T | GF | GA | GD | Pts | |
|---|---|---|---|---|---|---|---|---|---|---|
| 1 | Columbus Crew (C, S) | 30 | 17 | 7 | 6 | 50 | 36 | +14 | 57 | Qualification for the CONCACAF Champions League |
| 2 | Houston Dynamo | 30 | 13 | 5 | 12 | 45 | 32 | +13 | 51 | Qualification for the CONCACAF Champions League |
| 3 | Chicago Fire | 30 | 13 | 10 | 7 | 44 | 33 | +11 | 46 | Qualification for the North American SuperLiga |
| 4 | Chivas USA | 30 | 12 | 11 | 7 | 40 | 41 | −1 | 43 | Qualification for the North American SuperLiga |
| 5 | New England Revolution | 30 | 12 | 11 | 7 | 40 | 43 | −3 | 43 | Qualification for the North American SuperLiga |
| 6 | Kansas City Wizards | 30 | 11 | 10 | 9 | 37 | 39 | −2 | 42 | Qualification for the North American SuperLiga |
| 7 | Real Salt Lake | 30 | 10 | 10 | 10 | 40 | 39 | +1 | 40 | |
| 8 | New York Red Bulls | 30 | 10 | 11 | 9 | 42 | 48 | −6 | 39 | Qualification for the CONCACAF Champions League |
| 9 | Colorado Rapids | 30 | 11 | 14 | 5 | 44 | 45 | −1 | 38 | |
| 10 | D.C. United (U) | 30 | 11 | 15 | 4 | 43 | 51 | −8 | 37 | Qualification for the CONCACAF Champions League |
| 11 | FC Dallas | 30 | 8 | 10 | 12 | 45 | 41 | +4 | 36 | |
| 12 | Toronto FC | 30 | 9 | 13 | 8 | 34 | 43 | −9 | 35 | Qualification for the CONCACAF Champions League (Note: As winners of the 2009 Canadian Championship) |
| 13 | LA Galaxy | 30 | 8 | 13 | 9 | 55 | 62 | −7 | 33 | |
| 14 | San Jose Earthquakes | 30 | 8 | 13 | 9 | 32 | 38 | −6 | 33 | |

Source: MLS
Rules for classification: 1) points; 2) head-to-head record; 3) goal difference; 4) number of goals scored
(C) MLS Cup champions; (S) Supporters' Shield winners; (U) U.S. Open Cup winners

== MLS Cup playoffs ==
=== Bracket ===
Conference semifinals
E1 | Columbus Crew | 1 | 2
E4 | Kansas City Wizards | 1 | 0
Eastern Conference
E3 | New England Revolution | 0 | 0
E2 | Chicago Fire | 0 | 3
W1 | Houston Dynamo | 1 | 0
W4 | New York Red Bulls | 1 | 3
Western Conference
W3 | Real Salt Lake | 1 | 2
W2 | Chivas USA | 0 | 2

Conference finals
E1 | Columbus Crew | 2
E2 | Chicago Fire | 1
W4 | New York Red Bulls | 1
W3 | Real Salt Lake | 0

MLS Cup
E1 | Columbus Crew | 3
W4 | New York Red Bulls | 1

^{1} The New York Red Bulls earned the eighth and final playoff berth, despite finishing fifth in the Eastern Conference. They represented the fourth seed in the Western Conference playoff bracket, as only three teams in the Western Conference qualified for the playoffs.

== Player statistics ==
=== Goals ===
| Rank | Player | Club | Goals |
|---|---|---|---|
| 1 | (United States) Landon Donovan | LA Galaxy | 20 |
| 2 | (United States) Kenny Cooper | FC Dallas | 18 |
| 3 | (United States) Edson Buddle | LA Galaxy | 15 |
| 4 | (Colombia) Juan Pablo Ángel | New York Red Bulls | 14 |
| 5 | (United States) Brian Ching | Houston Dynamo | 13 |
| 6 | (Brazil) Luciano Emilio | D.C. United | 11 |
| 6 | (United States) Conor Casey | Colorado Rapids | 11 |
| 8 | (Bolivia) Jaime Moreno | D.C. United | 10 |
| 9 | (United States) Chad Barrett | Chicago Fire; Toronto FC | 9 |
| 9 | (United States) Chris Rolfe | Chicago Fire | 9 |

=== Assists ===
| Rank | Player | Club | Assists |
|---|---|---|---|
| 1 | (Argentina) Guillermo Barros Schelotto | Columbus Crew | 16 |
| 2 | (Argentina) Javier Morales | Real Salt Lake | 11 |
| 3 | (England) Terry Cooke | Colorado Rapids | 10 |
| 4 | (England) David Beckham | LA Galaxy | 8 |
| 4 | (United States) Justin Mapp | Chicago Fire | 8 |
| 6 | (Argentina) Christian Gómez | Colorado Rapids | 7 |
| 7 | (Mexico) Cuauhtémoc Blanco | Chicago Fire | 6 |
| 7 | (United States) Brad Davis | Houston Dynamo | 6 |
| 7 | (United States) Landon Donovan | LA Galaxy | 6 |
| 7 | (Bolivia) Jaime Moreno | D.C. United | 6 |
| 7 | (Republic of Ireland) Ronnie O'Brien | San Jose Earthquakes | 6 |

=== Clean sheets ===
| Rank | Player | Club | Clean sheets |
|---|---|---|---|
| 1 | (United States) Jon Busch | Chicago Fire | 10 |
| 1 | (United States) Kevin Hartman | Kansas City Wizards | 10 |
| 1 | (United States) Will Hesmer | Columbus Crew | 10 |
| 4 | (United States) Joe Cannon | San Jose Earthquakes | 9 |
| 5 | (United States) Nick Rimando | Real Salt Lake | 8 |
| 6 | (United States) Jon Conway | New York Red Bulls | 7 |
| 6 | (Canada) Pat Onstad | Houston Dynamo | 7 |
| 6 | (Argentina) Darío Sala | FC Dallas | 7 |
| 9 | (United States) Matt Reis | New England Revolution | 6 |
| 9 | (Canada) Greg Sutton | Toronto FC | 6 |

== Awards ==
=== Individual awards ===
| Award | Player | Club |
|---|---|---|
| Most Valuable Player | (Argentina) Guillermo Barros Schelotto | Columbus Crew |
| Defender of the Year | (United States) Chad Marshall | Columbus Crew |
| Goalkeeper of the Year | (United States) Jon Busch | Chicago Fire |
| Coach of the Year | (United States) Sigi Schmid | Columbus Crew |
| Rookie of the Year | (United States) Sean Franklin | LA Galaxy |
| Newcomer of the Year | (England) Darren Huckerby | San Jose Earthquakes |
| Comeback Player of the Year | (United States) Kenny Cooper | FC Dallas |
| Golden Boot | (United States) Landon Donovan | LA Galaxy |
| Goal of the Year | (Canada) Will Johnson | Real Salt Lake |
| Fair Play Award | (United States) Michael Parkhurst | New England Revolution |
| Humanitarian of the Year | (United States) José Burciaga Jr. | Colorado Rapids |

=== MLS Best XI ===
| Goalkeeper | Defenders | Midfielders | Forwards |
|---|---|---|---|
| (United States) Jon Busch, Chicago | (United States) Jimmy Conrad, Kansas City (United States) Chad Marshall, Columbus (Mali) Bakary Soumaré, Chicago | (Mexico) Cuauhtémoc Blanco, Chicago (Grenada) Shalrie Joseph, New England (United States) Sacha Kljestan, Chivas USA (United States) Robbie Rogers, Columbus (Argentina) Guillermo Barros Schelotto, Columbus | (United States) Kenny Cooper, Dallas (United States) Landon Donovan, LA Galaxy |

=== Player of the Month ===
| Week | Player | Club |
|---|---|---|
| April | (United States) Landon Donovan | LA Galaxy |
| May | (Mexico) Cuauhtémoc Blanco | Chicago Fire |
| June | (Brazil) Luciano Emilio | D.C. United |
| July | (United States) Nick Rimando | Real Salt Lake |
| August | (Argentina) Guillermo Barros Schelotto | Columbus Crew |
| September | (England) Darren Huckerby | San Jose Earthquakes |
| October | (Colombia) Juan Pablo Ángel | New York Red Bulls |

=== Weekly awards ===
Player of the Week
| Week | Player | Club |
|---|---|---|
| Week 1 | (England) Terry Cooke | Colorado Rapids |
| Week 2 | (England) David Beckham | LA Galaxy |
| Week 3 | (Argentina) Guillermo Barros Schelotto | Columbus Crew |
| Week 4 | (United States) Landon Donovan | LA Galaxy |
| Week 5 | (United States) Landon Donovan | LA Galaxy |
| Week 6 | (England) David Beckham | LA Galaxy |
| Week 7 | (United States) Robbie Rogers | Columbus Crew |
| Week 8 | (United States) Edson Buddle | LA Galaxy |
| Week 9 | (Mexico) Cuauhtémoc Blanco | Chicago Fire |
| Week 10 | (United States) Robbie Findley | Real Salt Lake |
| Week 11 | (United States) Brian Ching | Houston Dynamo |
| Week 12 | (United States) Edson Buddle | LA Galaxy |
| Week 13 | (United States) Landon Donovan | LA Galaxy |
| Week 14 | (United States) Steve Ralston | New England Revolution |
| Week 15 | (United States) Adam Cristman | New England Revolution |
| Week 16 | (United States) John Thorrington | Chicago Fire |
| Week 17 | (Argentina) Guillermo Barros Schelotto | Columbus Crew |
| Week 18 | (United States) Kenny Cooper | FC Dallas |
| Week 19 | (United States) Kenny Cooper | FC Dallas |
| Week 20 | (Colombia) Juan Pablo Ángel | New York Red Bulls |
| Week 21 | (Republic of Ireland) Ronnie O'Brien | San Jose Earthquakes |
| Week 22 | (Argentina) Guillermo Barros Schelotto | Columbus Crew |
| Week 23 | (Argentina) Fabian Espindola | Real Salt Lake |
| Week 24 | (Argentina) Guillermo Barros Schelotto | Columbus Crew |
| Week 25 | (United States) Steve Ralston | New England Revolution |
| Week 26 | (United States) Landon Donovan | LA Galaxy |
| Week 27 | (United States) Conor Casey | Colorado Rapids |
| Week 28 | (United States) Brian Ching | Houston Dynamo |
| Week 29 | (United States) Brian McBride | Chicago Fire |
| Week 30 | (Argentina) Claudio López | Kansas City Wizards |
| Week 31 | (United States) Chris Rolfe | Chicago Fire |

Goal of the Week
| Week | Player | Club |
|---|---|---|
| Week 1 | (The Gambia) Sainey Nyassi | New England Revolution |
| Week 2 | (United States) Geoff Cameron | Houston Dynamo |
| Week 3 | (United States) Sacha Kljestan | Chivas USA |
| Week 4 | (United States) Landon Donovan | LA Galaxy |
| Week 5 | (Argentina) Marcelo Gallardo | D.C. United |
| Week 6 | (United States) Chris Rolfe | Chicago Fire |
| Week 7 | (Mexico) Cuauhtémoc Blanco | Chicago Fire |
| Week 8 | (Argentina) Marcelo Gallardo | D.C. United |
| Week 9 | (Scotland) Tam McManus | Colorado Rapids |
| Week 10 | (United States) Robbie Findley | Real Salt Lake |
| Week 11 | (Brazil) Luciano Emilio | D.C. United |
| Week 12 | (United States) Clyde Simms | D.C. United |
| Week 13 | (Colombia) Gonzalo Martínez | D.C. United |
| Week 14 | (Brazil) Luciano Emilio | D.C. United |
| Week 15 | (United States) Ante Razov | Chivas USA |
| Week 16 | (United States) Ante Razov | Chivas USA |
| Week 17 | (Colombia) Juan Pablo Angel | New York Red Bulls |
| Week 18 | (United States) Abe Thompson | FC Dallas |
| Week 19 | (Bolivia) Jaime Moreno | D.C. United |
| Week 20 | (United States) Chad Barrett | Toronto FC |
| Week 21 | (United States) Brian Carroll | Columbus Crew |
| Week 22 | (United States) Joe Vide | D.C. United |
| Week 23 | (Argentina) Fabian Espindola | Real Salt Lake |
| Week 24 | (United States) Santino Quaranta | D.C. United |
| Week 25 | (United States) Davy Arnaud | Kansas City Wizards |
| Week 26 | (United States) Robbie Rogers | Columbus Crew |
| Week 27 | (United States) Josh Wolff | Kansas City Wizards |
| Week 28 | (Jamaica) Andy Williams | Real Salt Lake |
| Week 29 | (United States) Brandon McDonald | LA Galaxy |
| Week 30 | (United States) Danny Cepero | New York Red Bulls |
| Week 31 | (United States) Brad Evans | Columbus Crew |

== Attendance ==
| Rank | Team | GP | Cumulative | High | Low | Mean |
|---|---|---|---|---|---|---|
| 1 | LA Galaxy | 15 | 390,762 | 27,000 | 20,426 | 22,986 |
| 2 | Toronto FC | 15 | 303,623 | 22,264 | 19,657 | 17,860 |
| 3 | D.C. United | 15 | 297,531 | 35,979 | 13,329 | 17,502 |
| 4 | New England Revolution | 15 | 263,706 | 54,045 | 7,606 | 15,512 |
| 5 | Chicago Fire | 15 | 255,618 | 20,492 | 13,274 | 15,036 |
| 6 | Houston Dynamo | 15 | 254,093 | 30,361 | 10,908 | 14,947 |
| 7 | Real Salt Lake | 15 | 242,619 | 26,391 | 10,333 | 14,272 |
| 8 | New York Red Bulls | 15 | 238,925 | 46,754 | 9,053 | 14,054 |
| 9 | Chivas USA | 15 | 226,717 | 27,000 | 10,267 | 13,336 |
| 10 | Columbus Crew | 15 | 219,332 | 22,685 | 6,733 | 12,902 |
| 11 | San Jose Earthquakes | 15 | 205,875 | 39,872 | 9,046 | 12,110 |
| 12 | Colorado Rapids | 15 | 205,114 | 18,943 | 10,609 | 12,066 |
| 13 | FC Dallas | 15 | 196,455 | 23,500 | 7,103 | 11,556 |
| 14 | Kansas City Wizards | 15 | 160,384 | 26,211 | 8,096 | 9,434 |
| Total | | 210 | 3,461,013 | 54,045 | 6,733 | 16,481 |

== Related competitions ==
=== International competitions ===
==== CONCACAF Champions' Cup 2008 ====
The Houston Dynamo and D.C. United earned berths in the CONCACAF Champions' Cup by virtue of their MLS Cup and Supporters' Shield wins, respectively. Houston and D.C. were both victorious in their quarterfinal ties and advanced to the semifinals. For the second straight year, however, both lost their respective semifinals, and were eliminated.

==== SuperLiga 2008 ====
D.C. United, Chivas USA, the New England Revolution, and the Houston Dynamo were MLS's entrants into SuperLiga 2008, based on their top-four finish in the 2007 regular season.

Following the Group Stage, which took place from July 12 to July 20, Houston and New England each won their respective groups to advance to the Semifinals, where they faced 2007 champion Pachuca on July 29 and Atlante on July 30, respectively. D.C. United finished last and Chivas USA finished third in their respective groups and failed to advance.

Both MLS teams were victorious in the Semifinals, setting up a rematch of the 2006 and 2007 MLS Cups in the Final on August 5 at Gillette Stadium.

The teams played to a 2–2 draw after extra time. New England eventually defeated Houston 6–5 on penalty kicks.

==== CONCACAF Champions League 2008–09 ====
The Houston Dynamo (MLS Cup winner), D.C. United (Supporters' Shield Winner), the New England Revolution (U.S. Open Cup winner and MLS Cup runner-up), and Chivas USA (Supporters' Shield runner-up) were the representatives in the rebranded successor to the CONCACAF Champions' Cup.

New England and Chivas USA entered at the preliminary round, and were eliminated over two legs by Joe Public of Trinidad and Tobago and Tauro of Panama, respectively.

D.C. and Houston were seeded into the Group Stage as the top seeds in Groups A and B, respectively.

D.C. was eliminated from Group A with two games remaining in group play, while Houston qualified for the Championship Round with a 1–0 win in their last match against Luis Ángel Firpo on November 26, which was postponed from Matchday 1 due to Hurricane Ike.

Houston was eliminated in the Quarterfinals over two legs by Atlante.

=== National competitions ===
==== 2008 Lamar Hunt U.S. Open Cup ====
MLS awarded the top three finishers in each conference last season automatic berths into the 2008 U.S. Open Cup's Third Round. D.C. United, the New England Revolution, and the New York Red Bulls qualified from the Eastern Conference while Chivas USA, the Houston Dynamo, and FC Dallas qualified from the Western Conference. The rest of MLS's U.S.-based teams would have to compete for the final two berths into the third round via a seven-team playoff. Eventually Chicago Fire and the Kansas City Wizards qualified by beating the Columbus Crew and the Colorado Rapids respectively.

Each of the qualified MLS teams was matched up against the winner of a Second Round game, all of whom came from either one of the USL's three divisions or the USASA, in the third round on July 1. Three MLS teams were eliminated by these lower division clubs. Chivas USA was eliminated by USL-1's Seattle Sounders, the New York Red Bulls were upset by Crystal Palace Baltimore of USL-2, and the Houston Dynamo lost a penalty shootout to the USL-1's Charleston Battery.

In the Quarterfinals on July 8, FC Dallas and the Kansas City Wizards were eliminated by the Charleston Battery and the Seattle Sounders, respectively. This meant an MLS team, either D.C. United or the New England Revolution would face a USL-1 team in the final.

In the Semifinals on August 12, D.C. United upset the Open Cup holding Revolution by a score of 3 to 1. This earned United a berth in the final against the USL-1's Charleston Battery on September 3 at RFK Stadium.

In the Final on September 3, D.C. United won their second U.S. Open Cup in a 2–1 win over the Charleston Battery.

==== 2008 Canadian Championship ====
Due to the fact that none of the Canadian teams playing in the American soccer pyramid can qualify for Canada's berth in the CONCACAF Champions League through their leagues or the U.S. Open Cup, the Canadian Soccer Association was forced to develop a tournament to determine the country's representative in the Champions League. The country's top three teams, MLS's Toronto FC and the USL-1's Montreal Impact and Vancouver Whitecaps FC were entered into the inaugural Canadian Championship. The tournament was played as a double round robin group from May 27 to July 22. The Montreal Impact finished first, claiming the Canadian berth in the Champions League.

=== All-Star game ===
The 2008 MLS All-Star Game was held at BMO Field in Toronto, Ontario, Canada, home of Toronto FC, on July 24. The opponent was West Ham United, of England's Premier League. It was the first time that the game was played outside the United States.

The game was won by the MLS All-Stars by a score of 3–2. Cuauhtémoc Blanco was named MVP of the game after assisting the All-Stars' first goal and scoring their second.

== See also ==
- List of transfers for the MLS 2008 Season
- 2007 MLS Expansion Draft
