= List of New York Red Bulls seasons =

Since its foundation in 1996, the American soccer club New York Red Bulls (formerly the MetroStars) has played in the Major League Soccer professional league. The team has won 3 Supporters' Shields.

== Key ==
Key to competitions

- Major League Soccer (MLS) – The top-flight of soccer in the United States, established in 1996.
- U.S. Open Cup (USOC) – The premier knockout cup competition in U.S. soccer, first contested in 1914.
- CONCACAF Champions League (CCL) – The premier competition in North American soccer since 1962. It went by the name of Champions' Cup until 2008.

Key to colors and symbols

| 1st or W | Winners |
| 2nd or RU | Runners-up |
| 3rd | Third place |
| Last | Wooden Spoon |
| ♦ | MLS Golden Boot |
| | Highest average attendance |
| Italics | Ongoing competition |

Key to league record

- Season = The year and article of the season
- Div = Division/level on pyramid
- League = League name
- Pld = Games played
- W = Games won
- L = Games lost
- D = Games drawn
- GF = Goals for
- GA = Goals against
- GD = Goal difference
- Pts = Points
- PPG = Points per game
- Conf. = Conference position
- Overall = League position

Key to cup record

- DNE = Did not enter
- DNQ = Did not qualify
- NH = Competition not held or canceled
- QR = Qualifying round
- PR = Preliminary round
- GS = Group stage
- R1 = First round
- R2 = Second round
- R3 = Third round
- R4 = Fourth round
- R5 = Fifth round
- Ro16 = Round of 16
- QF = Quarterfinals
- SF = Semifinals
- F = Final
- RU = Runners-up
- W = Winners

== Seasons ==
| Season | League (Note: Until 2000, all regular season matches that were tied at the end of regulation time were decided by a penalty shootout from 35 yards.) | | | | | | | | | | Position | | Playoffs | USOC | Continental / Other | | Average attendance (Note: Average attendance only includes statistics from regular season matches.) | Top goalscorer(s) (Note: Top goalscorer(s) includes all goals scored in the regular season, MLS Cup Playoffs, U.S. Open Cup, MLS is Back Tournament, CONCACAF Champions League, FIFA Club World Cup, and other competitive continental matches.) | |
| Season | League | Pld | W | L | D | GF | GA | GD | Pts | PPG | Conf. | Overall | Playoffs | USOC | Continental / Other | | Average attendance | Name(s) | Goals |
|---|---|---|---|---|---|---|---|---|---|---|---|---|---|---|---|---|---|---|---|
| 1996 | MLS | 32 | 15 | 17 | 0 | 45 | 47 | –2 | 39 | 1.22 | 3rd | 7th | QF | DNE | DNE | | 23,898 | (Venezuela) Giovanni Savarese | 14 |
| 1997 | MLS | 32 | 13 | 19 | 0 | 43 | 53 | –10 | 35 | 1.09 | 5th | 9th | DNQ | SF | DNQ | | 16,899 | (Venezuela) Giovanni Savarese | 14 |
| 1998 | MLS | 32 | 15 | 17 | 0 | 54 | 63 | –9 | 39 | 1.22 | 3rd | 6th | QF | SF | DNQ | | 16,519 | (Venezuela) Giovanni Savarese | 16 |
| 1999 | MLS | 32 | 7 | 25 | 0 | 32 | 64 | –32 | 15 | 0.47 | 6th | 12th | DNQ | Ro16 | DNQ | | 14,706 | (Ecuador) Eduardo Hurtado | 7 |
| 2000 | MLS | 32 | 17 | 12 | 3 | 64 | 56 | +8 | 54 | 1.69 | 1st | 3rd | SF | SF | DNQ | | 17,621 | (Colombia) Adolfo Valencia | 21 |
| 2001 | MLS | 26 | 13 | 10 | 3 | 38 | 35 | +3 | 42 | 1.62 | 2nd | 6th | QF | R2 | Copa Merconorte | GS | 20,806 | (Brazil) Rodrigo Faria | 11 |
| 2002 | MLS | 28 | 11 | 15 | 2 | 41 | 47 | –6 | 35 | 1.25 | 4th | 9th | DNQ | Ro16 | DNQ | | 18,155 | (Brazil) Rodrigo Faria | 14 |
| 2003 | MLS | 30 | 11 | 10 | 9 | 40 | 40 | +0 | 42 | 1.40 | 3rd | 5th | QF | RU | DNQ | | 15,822 | (United States) Clint Mathis | 10 |
| 2004 | MLS | 30 | 11 | 12 | 7 | 47 | 49 | –2 | 40 | 1.33 | 3rd | 6th | QF | Ro16 | DNQ | | 17,195 | (Honduras) Amado Guevara (United States) John Wolyniec | 10♦ (Note: Guevara won the MLS Golden Boot (30 points)) |
| 2005 | MLS | 32 | 12 | 9 | 11 | 53 | 49 | +4 | 47 | 1.47 | 4th | 6th | QF | Ro16 | DNQ | | 15,077 | (Honduras) Amado Guevara | 12 |
| 2006 | MLS | 32 | 9 | 11 | 12 | 41 | 41 | +0 | 39 | 1.22 | 4th | 8th | QF | QF | DNQ | | 14,570 | (Honduras) Amado Guevara | 9 |
| 2007 | MLS | 30 | 12 | 11 | 7 | 47 | 45 | +2 | 43 | 1.43 | 3rd | 6th | QF | QR2 | DNQ | | 16,530 | (Colombia) Juan Pablo Ángel | 20 |
| 2008 | MLS | 30 | 10 | 11 | 9 | 42 | 48 | –6 | 39 | 1.30 | 5th | 8th | RU | Ro16 | DNQ | | 15,928 | (Colombia) Juan Pablo Ángel | 16 |
| 2009 | MLS | 30 | 5 | 19 | 6 | 27 | 47 | –20 | 21 | 0.70 | 7th | 15th | DNQ | QR2 | CONCACAF Champions League | PR | 12,744 | (Colombia) Juan Pablo Ángel | 12 |
| 2010 | MLS | 30 | 15 | 9 | 6 | 38 | 29 | +9 | 51 | 1.70 | 1st | 3rd | QF | Ro16 | DNQ | | 18,441 | (Colombia) Juan Pablo Ángel | 14 |
| 2011 | MLS | 34 | 10 | 8 | 16 | 50 | 44 | +6 | 46 | 1.35 | 5th | 10th | QF | QF | DNQ | | 19,691 | (France) Thierry Henry | 15 |
| 2012 | MLS | 34 | 16 | 9 | 9 | 57 | 46 | +11 | 57 | 1.68 | 3rd | 4th | QF | Ro16 | DNQ | | 18,281 | (United States) Kenny Cooper | 19 |
| 2013 | MLS | 34 | 17 | 9 | 8 | 58 | 41 | +17 | 59 | 1.74 | 1st | 1st | QF | Ro16 | DNQ | | 19,461 | (Australia) Tim Cahill | 12 |
| 2014 | MLS | 34 | 13 | 10 | 11 | 55 | 50 | +5 | 50 | 1.47 | 4th | 8th | SF | R4 | CONCACAF Champions League | GS | 19,421 | (England) Bradley Wright-Phillips | 31♦ (Note: Wright-Phillips won the MLS Golden Boot (27 goals)) |
| 2015 | MLS | 34 | 18 | 10 | 6 | 62 | 43 | +19 | 60 | 1.76 | 1st | 1st | SF | QF | DNQ | | 19,657 | (England) Bradley Wright-Phillips | 18 |
| 2016 | MLS | 34 | 16 | 9 | 9 | 61 | 44 | +17 | 57 | 1.68 | 1st | 3rd | QF | Ro16 | CONCACAF Champions League | QF | 20,620 | (England) Bradley Wright-Phillips | 25♦ (Note: Wright-Phillips won the MLS Golden Boot (24 goals)) |
| 2017 | MLS | 34 | 14 | 12 | 8 | 53 | 47 | +6 | 50 | 1.47 | 6th | 9th | QF | RU | DNQ | | 21,175 | (England) Bradley Wright-Phillips | 24 |
| 2018 | MLS | 34 | 22 | 7 | 5 | 62 | 33 | +29 | 71 | 2.09 | 1st | 1st | SF | Ro16 | CONCACAF Champions League | SF | 18,644 | (England) Bradley Wright-Phillips | 24 |
| 2019 | MLS | 34 | 14 | 14 | 6 | 53 | 51 | +2 | 48 | 1.41 | 6th | 12th | R1 | R4 | CONCACAF Champions League | QF | 17,281 | (Austria) Daniel Royer | 14 |
| 2020 | MLS | 23 | 9 | 9 | 5 | 29 | 31 | –2 | 32 | 1.39 | 6th | 13th | R1 | NH | Leagues Cup MLS is Back Tournament | NH GS | 15,703 | (United States) Brian White | 6 |
| 2021 | MLS | 34 | 13 | 12 | 9 | 39 | 33 | +6 | 48 | 1.41 | 7th | 14th | R1 | NH | DNQ | | 13,120 | (Poland) Patryk Klimala | 8 |
| 2022 | MLS | 34 | 15 | 11 | 8 | 50 | 41 | +9 | 53 | 1.56 | 4th | 6th | R1 | SF | DNQ | | 17,002 | (Scotland) Lewis Morgan | 17 |
| 2023 | MLS | 34 | 11 | 13 | 10 | 36 | 39 | -3 | 43 | 1.26 | 9th | 18th | R1 | Ro16 | Leagues Cup | Ro16 | 17,786 | (United States) Omir Fernandez | 8 |
| 2024 | MLS | 34 | 11 | 9 | 14 | 55 | 50 | +5 | 47 | 1.38 | 7th | 16th | RU | DNE | Leagues Cup | GS | 19,479 | (Scotland) Lewis Morgan | 13 |
| 2025 | MLS | 34 | 12 | 15 | 7 | 48 | 47 | +1 | 43 | 1.26 | 10th | 18th | DNQ | QF | Leagues Cup | GS | 19,710 | (Cameroon) Eric Maxim Choupo-Moting | 18 |
| Total | | 957 | 387 | 364 | 206 | 1,420 | 1,353 | +67 | 1,345 | 1.41 | — | — | — | — | — | | — | (England) Bradley Wright-Phillips | 126 |
