= Kevin Thelwell =

English football executive

Kevin Thelwell is an English football coach. He was most recently the Sporting Director of Scottish club Rangers.

Thelwell is the former Director of Football at Wolverhampton Wanderers, having previously held the position of academy manager and later head of football development and recruitment at the club, following similar positions at Derby County and Preston North End respectively.

Prior to this, Thelwell was Director of Coach Education for the Football Association of Wales Trust where he was responsible for the UEFA Advanced Licence and Pro Licence courses. In February 2020, Thelwell and his family moved to the United States, where he took up the role of head of sport at New York Red Bulls.

On 25 February 2022, Thelwell returned to England and was appointed as the Director of Football of Premier League club Everton. He held this position until the end of the 2024–25 season, when he moved to Scottish club Rangers.

== Playing career ==
Thelwell grew up in northwestern England. As a schoolboy, he progressed through the academy at Crewe Alexandra before moving to Shrewsbury Town, where he gained an apprenticeship and progressed into the professional ranks. He failed to make a senior appearance for the club and instead led a semi-pro career with clubs such as Northwich Victoria, Winsford United and Congleton Town.

== Coaching career ==
Thelwell began his coaching career with the Football Association of Wales Trust following his appointment as the Football Development Officer for Denbighshire, North Wales, in 1998. In the same year, he completed the FA/UEFA Advanced Licence at 25 years of age. Thelwell also holds the FAW/UEFA Advanced Licence and UEFA Pro Licence. Thelwell completed a Bsc (Hons) degree in Sport Science.

In 2002, Thelwell was appointed as Director of Coach Education with the responsibility of coordinating and developing coach education at all levels in Wales. This included the organisation and delivery of the FAW/UEFA Advanced Licence and Pro Licence courses accessed by coaches and managers working within the professional game.

In the summer of 2005, Thelwell was appointed by Billy Davies as Director of Youth at Preston North End, and in his first season saw his youth team win the Football League Youth Alliance National Cup. At the beginning of the 2006–07 season, Davies left Preston to become manager of Derby County and made Thelwell his first appointment as Academy Manager, becoming the youngest academy manager in the country, aged 32. Thelwell combined this academy role with that of acting first team coach, helping the club win promotion to the Premier League in his first season via the play-offs. After an unsuccessful start to their top flight campaign, Billy Davies left the club by mutual consent in November 2007 and Thelwell was appointed as caretaker manager in the interim (two-day) period before the appointment of Paul Jewell as their new manager. In April 2008, he left Derby County and was appointed academy manager at Wolverhampton Wanderers, replacing Chris Evans.

On 3 February 2020, Thelwell made a move to the United States to become the head of sport at Major League Soccer side New York Red Bulls. In New York, Thelwell oversaw all aspects of the sporting side of the club with Sporting Director Denis Hamlett reporting to Thelwell. He left New York Red Bulls on 25 February 2022 to take up the vacant Director of Football role at Everton. He held this position until the end of the 2024–25 season, when he moved to Scottish club Rangers.

Thelwell is the author of several coaching books, including Coaching the European 3-5-2.
