= Raging Bull Nation =

Supporters group for the New York Red Bulls

RagingBullNation, formerly known as MetroNation, is a supporters group for the New York Red Bulls of Major League Soccer. It is a New Jersey non-profit corporation. MetroNation was founded on February 21, 2005 in Wayne, New Jersey by Marc "Chief Metro" Bernarducci as a way of fostering support for the predecessor to the Red Bulls, the MetroStars.

The MetroStars were purchased by the Austrian beverage company Red Bull on March 9, 2006 and were rebranded as the New York Red Bulls. The club continues to exist under its new RagingBullNation name.

RagingBullNation encourages its members to become the "12th man" for the Red Bulls by leading creative chants and encouraging players on the field. RagingBullNation's section at Giants Stadium on gameday was 115 in the lower bowl. This section is referred to as "Citizens Corner" or "The Corral" as it is positioned in the corner by one goal. Raging Bull Nation was not granted a sideline supporters section when the team moved to Red Bull Arena in 2010 and disbanded. Many of Raging Bull Nation's members united with numerous ex-Empire Supporters Club members to form a new group known as the Viking Army Supporters Club.

== Charitable activities ==
In its first year of existence, MetroNation raised $1015 in donations for the Leukemia & Lymphoma Society. MetroNation also raised funds for victims of Hurricane Katrina. When evacuees from New Orleans resettled temporarily in the New York City area, MetroNation hosted them at a MetroStars match on September 17, 2005 – a wild 5–4 MetroStars victory over New England Revolution.

== Group culture ==
RagingBullNation is known for their "RoadSide Roundup" (formerly "MetroGate") game day tailgate parties, located in parking lot 15 outside the South Tower entrance of Giants Stadium. On the occasion of USA international matches being scheduled on the same day as Red Bulls matches, Raging Bull Nation has organized watch parties in the parking lot using portable satellite equipment.

Raging Bull Nation organizes its away game road trips to D.C. United and New England Revolution in coordination with other Red Bulls supporters clubs, such as Empire Supporters Club and First Row Idiots.

Raging Bull Nation has an official theme song written by Mike Apple.

On Red Bulls home opening day 2006, Raging Bull Nation unveiled its tribute entitled “From the Stars and Stripes to the Red and Black.” It will be a tribute to the MetroStars who played in the 1994 FIFA World Cup and it will be kept at the Pride and Passion Pub at Giants Stadium until its move to the new stadium pub at Sports Illustrated Stadium. The players honored include Hall of Famer Tab Ramos and future Hall of Famers Tony Meola and Alexi Lalas.

== Recognition ==
MSG Network color commentator Shep Messing has taken to referring to all Red Bulls supporters as The MetroNation after noticing MetroNation scarves held aloft at games. However the largest and most influential Red Bulls supporters club is the Empire Supporters Club.

MetroNation member John "Johnny Metro" Russo was named 2004 MetroStars Fan of the Year. It has become tradition for all newly signed MetroStars players to sign Johnny Metro's shaved head.
