= Empire Supporters Club =

Supporters group of New York Red Bulls

- Empire Supporters Club logo
- Abbreviation: ESC
- Established: 1995
- Type: Supporters' group Ultras group
- Team: New York Red Bulls
- Motto: "Soy del Metro"
- Location: Harrison, New Jersey, U.S.
- Arena: Sports Illustrated Stadium
- Colors: Red, white
- Website: Official website

The Empire Supporters Club, or ESC, is one of the oldest supporters clubs in Major League Soccer and the largest supporters club dedicated to the New York Red Bulls of Major League Soccer.

== History ==
The club was founded in 1995 by members of the New York City Firm (NYCF), a supporters group for the short-lived A-League New York Centaurs, in anticipation of a Major League Soccer franchise starting play in the New York/New Jersey metro area. To reflect the initial franchise name, Empire Soccer Club, the supporters chose to name themselves the Empire Supporters Club. By the start of the inaugural year the team owners had elected to call the team the New York/New Jersey MetroStars.

Since its founding, the variety of backgrounds amongst club members has influenced the style of the group in the stands. The end result is a mix of South American Barra, European Ultra, British Supporter and American flavor with the members singing in both English and Spanish.

On March 9, 2006, it was announced that Austrian energy drink conglomerate Red Bull GmbH had purchased the club, and as part of their sponsorship, they would also completely re-brand the franchise, changing the name, colors, and logo, a move which drew mixed reactions. Some of the original NYCF members left after this, and later a part of this group began supporting the New York City FC after its foundation.

Prior to New York Red Bulls home matches in the past, the ESC tailgate took place in parking lot 16-A at Giants Stadium. Starting in the 2010 season, the official game day pub of the club is El Pastor Restaurant in Newark, NJ. During games, supporters stood in section 101 of Giants Stadium, directly above the player's entrance tunnel, and supported the club with songs and chants. Section 101 is also where the ESC now stands at Sports Illustrated Stadium in Harrison, NJ. 101 is the middle of 3 sections composing the supporters end known as the "South Ward."

In addition to its base membership, the ESC acts as an umbrella organization for a variety of smaller groups, including Sparta Metro Firm, MDS, Cobra Kai Metro Firm, La Banda Imperial, Hub City Hooligans, Metro Ultras. The Red Bulls' two other largest supporters groups, Garden State Supporters and the Viking Army, can trace their roots back to the ESC as well. It is not uncommon for members of the ESC to hold dual memberships with any of the other Red Bulls supporter clubs. Many of these same supporters have joined independent US men's national team supporters clubs like the North Jersey Brigade, Sam's Army and the American Outlaws.

For most away games and US men's national team games, the ESC organizes viewing parties, usually at the Football Factory in Legends in New York City. The club also handles away ticketing and transportation for many away matches (particularly matches against neighboring teams New England Revolution, D.C. United, New York City FC, and the Philadelphia Union franchise).

On April 15, 2023, the club - alongside fellow supporters groups Viking Army and Torcida 96 - voted for and staged a walkout at Red Bull Arena at the start of a match against Houston Dynamo. The groups protested the actions of New York forward Dante Vanzeir, who was suspended six games after uttering a racial slur during a game on April 8 against the San Jose Earthquakes, as well as manager Gerhard Struber, who insisted on keeping the player in the match after the incident. The club voted to protest from within the stadium for the next home game on May 6, after which they returned to usual operations following Struber's firing.

== Songs ==
The ESC has performed hundreds of chants throughout the years. The ESC chants in both English and Spanish because of the large number of Spanish speakers in the group. Popular English songs include "We Love You", "As Long As I'm Breathing", "Everywhere We Go", "I Believe", and "No Cojones". Popular Spanish songs include "Soy del Metro" (also the supporters' Motto), "Baila Hinchada Baila", "Ole Ole Ola", "El Que no Salta" and "Metro, Mi Buen Amigo". Covers of songs such as The Ramones' "I Wanna Be Sedated" are also included, though personalized for the support. To maintain cohesion, most chants are started by designated supporters in the section, leading the club in song when needed.

With the building of the team's own stadium, Red Bull Arena, the supporters have become closer to the general public, in both communication and proximity. Sitting near the goal, and surrounded on all sides by unaffiliated fans, the club is able to encourage, and often lead, the surrounding crowds in song. The sound carries more under the roof of the arena as compared to Giants Stadium.

== Philanthropy ==
With the team's new arena and a local restaurant acting as supporters' home, the Empire Supporters Club has begun reaching out to the community by hosting or participating in charity events.

From 2009 to 2011 the club played in the Downtown United Soccer Club's annual supporter's club charity soccer tournament in support of the City Soccer Initiative.

In August 2010 the club used its home venue at El Pastor in Newark to host a fundraiser for Joe Vide, an ex-player diagnosed with cancer.

February 2011, a month before the start of the 2011 MLS season, saw the ESC men's soccer team play in the inaugural South Ward Football Challenge, winning the Spanish Pavilion Cup. The tournament saw teams representing the ESC, Garden State Supporters, Viking Army supporters and NY Red Bull front office play for the cup and bring in both cash and equipment donations for Balls Without Borders and the U.S. Soccer Foundation. 2012 saw the return of the South Ward Football Challenge with the ESC team defending its title and helping, along with the other participating teams, to raise money for the Harrison Housing Authority.

== See also ==
- Raging Bull Nation
