= 1997 New York/New Jersey MetroStars season =

NY/NJ MetroStars
1997 season
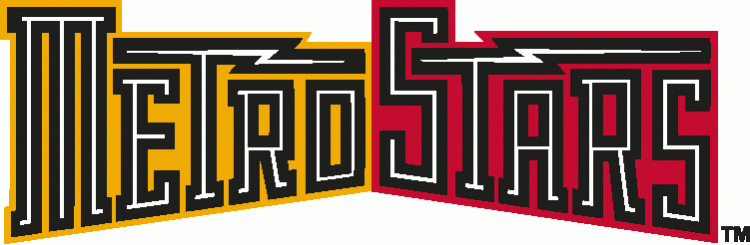
- Head coach: Carlos Alberto Parreira
- Stadium: Giants Stadium
- MLS: 5th, East
- Playoffs: Did not qualify
- U.S. Open Cup: Semi-finals
- Average home league attendance: 16,899
Home colors	Away colors

The 1997 New York/New Jersey MetroStars season was the franchise's second year of existence and their second year in the top-tier of American soccer. The MetroStars played in Major League Soccer's Eastern Conference for the second consecutive season.

The MetroStars failed to qualify for the playoffs by finishing fifth in the Eastern Conference. Outside of MLS play, the MetroStars reached the semifinals of the U.S. Open Cup. There, the MetroStars lost to eventual Open Cup champions, Dallas Burn.

== Player statistics ==
=== Top scorers ===
Place	Position	Number	Name	MLS	MLS Cup	U.S. Open Cup	Total
1	FW	17	(Venezuela) Giovanni Savarese	14	0	0	14
2	FW	11	(Colombia) Antony De Avila	9	0	0	9
3	MF	6	(United States) Mike Sorber	4	0	0	4
3	FW	12	(South Africa) Shaun Bartlett	2	0	2	2
4	MF	7	(Italy) Roberto Donadoni	3	0	0	3
4	MF	19	(United States) Miles Joseph	2	0	1	3
5	DF	3	(United States) Mark Semioli	2	0	0	2
5	DF	4	(Brazil) Branco	1	0	1	2
5	MF	10	(United States) Tab Ramos	2	0	0	2
5	FW	22	(United States) A.J. Wood	2	0	0	2
6	DF	15	(United States) Rhett Harty	0	0	1	1
6	MF	20	(United States) Brian Kelly	1	0	0	1
Total				40	0	4	44

As of December 31, 1997.
