= 2006 New York Red Bulls season =

New York Red Bulls
2006 season
- Chairman: Red Bull GmbH
- Manager: Bruce Arena

The 2006 season was the 12th season of New York Red Bulls's franchise existence, and their first year playing as the Red Bulls. They played their home games at Giants Stadium in East Rutherford, New Jersey.

== Major League Soccer season ==
=== Eastern Conference ===
Pos	Team	Pld	W	L	T	GF	GA	GD	Pts	Qualification
1	D.C. United	32	15	7	10	52	38	+14	55	MLS Cup Playoffs
2	New England Revolution	32	12	8	12	39	35	+4	48	MLS Cup Playoffs
3	Chicago Fire	32	13	11	8	43	41	+2	47	MLS Cup Playoffs
4	New York Red Bulls	32	9	11	12	41	41	0	39	MLS Cup Playoffs
5	Kansas City Wizards	32	10	14	8	43	45	−2	38	
6	Columbus Crew	32	8	15	9	30	42	−12	33	

Source: MLS

=== Overall ===
Pos	Team	Pld	W	L	D	GF	GA	GD	Pts	
1	D.C. United (SS, E1)	32	15	7	10	52	38	+14	55	2007 CONCACAF Champions' Cup
2	FC Dallas (W1)	32	16	12	4	48	44	+4	52	2007 North American SuperLiga
3	New England Revolution	32	12	8	12	39	35	+4	48	2007 North American SuperLiga
4	Chicago Fire	32	13	11	8	43	41	+2	47	2006 MLS Cup Playoffs
5	Houston Dynamo	32	11	8	13	44	40	+4	46	2007 CONCACAF Champions' Cup
6	Chivas USA	32	10	9	13	45	42	+3	43	2006 MLS Cup Playoffs
7	Colorado Rapids	32	11	13	8	36	49	−13	41	2006 MLS Cup Playoffs
8	New York Red Bulls	32	9	11	12	41	41	0	39	2006 MLS Cup Playoffs
9	LA Galaxy	32	11	15	6	37	37	0	39	2007 North American SuperLiga
10	Real Salt Lake	32	10	13	9	45	49	−4	39	
11	Kansas City Wizards	32	10	14	8	43	45	−2	38	
12	Columbus Crew	32	8	15	9	30	42	−12	33	

=== Matches ===
April 2 1	D.C. United	2–2	New York Red Bulls	Washington, D.C.
	Eskandarian 55'; Erpen 65'	Report	Djorkaeff 6'; Buddle 17'	Stadium: RFK Stadium

April 8 2	New York Red Bulls	0–0	New England Revolution	East Rutherford, New Jersey
		Report		Stadium: Giants Stadium

April 15 3	Real Salt Lake	1–1	New York Red Bulls	Salt Lake City, Utah
	Kreis 89'	Report	Guevara 77'	Stadium: Rice–Eccles Stadium

April 22 4	New York Red Bulls	1–4	D.C. United	East Rutherford, New Jersey
	Djorkaeff 86'	Report	Eskandarian 41', 59'; Erpen 71'; Walker 88'	Stadium: Giants Stadium

April 29 5	Chivas USA	0–0	New York Red Bulls	Carson, California
		Report		Stadium: Home Depot Center

May 13 6	New York Red Bulls	1–1	Chicago Fire	East Rutherford, New Jersey
	Peguero 27'	Report	Gutiérrez 68' (pen.)	Stadium: Giants Stadium

May 20 7	New York Red Bulls	5–4	Chivas USA	East Rutherford, New Jersey
	Peguero 20', 38', 89'; Stammler 54', 69'	Report	Razov 59', 77'; Palencia 64', 90+5' (pen.)	Stadium: Giants Stadium

May 24 8	New York Red Bulls	1–2	FC Dallas	East Rutherford, New Jersey
	Stammler 8'	Report	Cooper 76'; Ruiz 87'	Stadium: Giants Stadium

June 3 9	Kansas City Wizards	1–1	New York Red Bulls	Kansas City, Missouri
	Burciaga Jr. 58' (pen.)	Report	Henderson 30'	Stadium: Arrowhead Stadium

June 10 10	New York Red Bulls	1–1	Houston Dynamo	East Rutherford, New Jersey
	Peguero 2'	Report	Clark 19'	Stadium: Giants Stadium

June 17 11	New York Red Bulls	2–1	LA Galaxy	East Rutherford, New Jersey
	Buddle 27'; Peguero 28'	Report	Gomez 25'	Stadium: Giants Stadium

June 25 12	Chicago Fire	2–0	New York Red Bulls	Bridgeview, Illinois
	Armas 12'; Thiago 68'	Report		Stadium: Toyota Park

June 28 13	New York Red Bulls	0–0	Columbus Crew	East Rutherford, New Jersey
		Report		Stadium: Giants Stadium

July 1 14	New England Revolution	3–2	New York Red Bulls	Foxborough, Massachusetts
	Dempsey 6', 72'; Twellman 45+1'; John (red card) 83'	Report	Buddle 24'; Magee 66'	Stadium: Gillette Stadium

July 4 15	LA Galaxy	1–0	New York Red Bulls	Carson, California
	Donovan 65'	Report		Stadium: Home Depot Center

July 8 16	FC Dallas	2–1	New York Red Bulls	Frisco, Texas
	Oduro 2'; Wagenfuhr 33'	Report	Magee 80'	Stadium: Pizza Hut Park

July 14 17	New York Red Bulls	1–0	Colorado Rapids	East Rutherford, New Jersey
	Guevara 35' (pen.)	Report		Stadium: Giants Stadium

July 19 18	Columbus Crew	0–2	New York Red Bulls	Columbus, Ohio
		Report	Henderson 50'; Laventure 90'	Stadium: Columbus Crew Stadium

July 22 19	New York Red Bulls	1–0	Kansas City Wizards	East Rutherford, New Jersey
	Magee 25'	Report		Stadium: Giants Stadium

July 29 20	Houston Dynamo	1–1	New York Red Bulls	Houston, Texas
	Clark 11'		Peguero 2'	Stadium: Robertson Stadium

August 16 21	New York Red Bulls	0–0	D.C. United	East Rutherford, New Jersey
		Report		Stadium: Giants Stadium

August 19 22	Columbus Crew	1–0	New York Red Bulls	Columbus, Ohio
	Ngwenya 82'	Report		Stadium: Columbus Crew Stadium

August 26 23	New York Red Bulls	6–0	Real Salt Lake	East Rutherford, New Jersey
	Buddle 54', 61', 72'; Cila 77'; Dunivant 79'; Wolyniec 86'	Report	Stewart (red card) 8'	Stadium: Giants Stadium

August 30 24	Kansas City Wizards	2–2	New York Red Bulls	Kansas City, Missouri
	Sealy 28'; Wolff 71'	Report	Wolyniec 30'; Dunivant 53'	Stadium: Arrowhead Stadium

September 3 25	Chicago Fire	2–1	New York Red Bulls	Bridgeview, Illinois
	Rolfe 13'; Gutiérrez 60'	Report	Wolyniec 78'	Stadium: Toyota Park

September 9 26	New England Revolution	1–0	New York Red Bulls	Foxborough, Massachusetts
	Noonan 8'	Report		Stadium: Gillette Stadium

September 16 27	New York Red Bulls	1–0	Columbus Crew	East Rutherford, New Jersey
	Altidore 83'	Report		Stadium: Giants Stadium

September 20 28	New England Revolution	2–0	New York Red Bulls	Foxborough, Massachusetts
	Twellman 16'; Dorman 48'	Report		Stadium: Gillette Stadium

September 23 29	D.C. United	4–3	New York Red Bulls	Washington, D.C.
	Mendes 10' (o.g.); Gómez 60'; Erpen (red card) 61'; Moreno 73'; Donnet 89'	Report	Guevara 20' (pen.), 82'; Altidore 90+2'	Stadium: RFK Stadium

September 30 30	New York Red Bulls	1–0	Chicago Fire	East Rutherford, New Jersey
	Altidore 60'	Report		Stadium: Giants Stadium

October 7 31	Colorado Rapids	1–1	New York Red Bulls	Commerce City, Colorado
	Peterson 4'; Petke (red card) 90+4'	Report	Guevara 60'	Stadium: Colorado Rapids Stadium

October 7 32	New York Red Bulls	3–2	Kansas City Wizards	East Rutherford, New Jersey
	Guevara 31' (pen.), 60' (pen.), 75'	Report	van den Bergh 23'; Sealy 83'; Garcia (red card) 87'	Stadium: Giants Stadium

=== MLS Cup Playoffs ===
==== Conference semifinals ====
October 21 Leg One	New York Red Bulls	0–1	D.C. United	East Rutherford, New Jersey
		Report	Gómez 77'	Stadium: Giants Stadium

October 29 Leg Two	D.C. United	1–1 (1–2 agg.)	New York Red Bulls	Washington, D.C.
	Gómez 86'	Report	Altidore 70'	Stadium: RFK Stadium

== U.S. Open Cup ==
August 2 Rd 4	Wilmington Hammerheads	1–2	New York Red Bulls	Wilmington, North Carolina
	Miller 85'	Report	Stammler 4'; Cila 86'	Stadium: Legion Stadium

August 23 Quarterfinals	D.C. United	3–1	New York Red Bulls	Washington, D.C.
	Gros 37'; Walker 61', 84'	Report	Guevara 41'	Stadium: RFK Stadium

== Player statistics ==
=== Top scorers ===
Place	Position	Number	Name	MLS	MLS Cup	U.S. Open Cup	Total
1	MF	20	(Honduras) Amado Guevara	8	0	1	9
2	FW	9	(Haiti) Peguero Jean Philippe	6	0	0	6
2	FW	11	(United States) Edson Buddle	6	0	0	6
3	MF	6	(United States) Seth Stammler	3	0	1	4
3	FW	17	(United States) Jozy Altidore	3	1	0	4
4	MF	7	(United States) Mike Magee	3	0	0	3
4	FW	15	(United States) John Wolyniec	3	0	0	3
4	MF	19	(United States) Chris Henderson	3	0	0	3
5	MF	10	(France) Youri Djorkaeff	2	0	0	2
5	DF	16	(United States) Todd Dunivant	2	0	0	2
5	FW	25	(United States) Jordan Cila	1	0	1	2
6	FW	28	(Haiti) Jerrod Laventure	1	0	0	1
Total				41	1	3	45

As of December 31, 2006.

== See also ==
- 2006 Major League Soccer season
