= New York Red Bulls =

American professional soccer club based in New York metropolitan area

- Full name: Red Bull New York
- Nicknames: The Red Bulls; Metro
- Short name: RBNY, NYRB
- Founded: 1994 (32 years ago); as New York/New Jersey MetroStars
- Stadium: Sports Illustrated Stadium; Harrison, New Jersey
- Capacity: 25,000
- Owner: Red Bull GmbH
- General manager: Marc de Grandpré
- Head coach: Michael Bradley
- League: Major League Soccer
- 2026: Eastern Conference: 10th Overall: 22nd Playoffs: Did not qualify
- Website: newyorkredbulls.com
Home colors	Away colors	Third colors

The New York Red Bulls are an American professional soccer club based in the New York metropolitan area. The Red Bulls compete in Major League Soccer (MLS) as a member of the Eastern Conference. The club was established in October 1994 and began play in the league's inaugural season in 1996 as the New York/New Jersey MetroStars. In 2006, the team was sold to Red Bull GmbH and re-branded as part of the company's global network of soccer clubs.

The Red Bulls have played their home matches at Sports Illustrated Stadium in Harrison, New Jersey, since 2010, having previously played at Giants Stadium. The club is one of two teams in MLS based in the New York metropolitan region along with New York City FC, which entered the league in 2015. The two teams compete against each other in the Hudson River Derby. Other rivals include the New England Revolution and fellow MLS originals D.C. United.

The Red Bulls have reached the MLS Cup final twice, in 2008 and 2024, losing both times. The club has won three Supporters' Shield titles, in 2013, 2015 and 2018. They also twice reached the final of the U.S. Open Cup in 2003 and 2017, losing on both occasions, and once have reached the semi finals of the CONCACAF Champions League in 2018, losing to Guadalajara.

== History ==
=== MetroStars era ===
The club's original name was Empire Soccer Club, which gave birth to the name of the team's largest supporters' group, Empire Supporters Club. The team's original owners were John Kluge and Stuart Subotnick. The name MetroStars was chosen in reference to Metromedia, the media company founded by Kluge, after Nike's original suggestion "MetroFlash" was rejected. The owners also considered but rejected buying the rights to the name "Cosmos".

Tab Ramos, the first player to sign with MLS, became the first MetroStars player, and was soon joined by 1994 FIFA World Cup teammate Tony Meola and A.C. Milan star midfielder Roberto Donadoni. 1990 World Cup player Peter Vermes was named the first team captain, but it was the previously unknown Venezuelan Giovanni Savarese who became the Metros' first breakthrough star. The team's first coach was Eddie Firmani of New York Cosmos fame.

In 1996, the MetroStars made news when they selected players named Juninho and Túlio in the 1996 MLS Supplemental Draft. This report set off an immediately positive reaction which was quickly crushed after the MetroStars revealed that they had not actually drafted well-known Brazilian players Juninho Paulista and Túlio Costa, as people had assumed. The MetroStars waived both draftees on March 25, 1996. While the identity of "Juninho" was later discovered, the true name and club history of "Tulio" remains unknown. This bizarre episode has entered MetroStars folk lore.

When the league began play in 1996, it was expected that the MetroStars would quickly become the league's dominant team. This expectation never materialized. Despite famous players and a high-profile coach, the team never seemed to click together. The team's first home game against the New England Revolution proved to be a harbinger of things to come. Former Juventus defender Nicola Caricola inadvertently flipped a cross into his own net in the dying minutes to hand New England a 1–0 win in front of 46,000 fans.

The resulting play would later be dubbed the "Curse of Caricola" by fans to explain the team's inability to come through with a domestic trophy in their history. Firmani left after eight games (3–5) and was replaced by former Portugal coach Carlos Queiróz, who did no better than even (12–12) the rest of the season. The team made it into the playoffs, only to lose to eventual champions D.C. United.

Starting in 1998, the team stopped referring to itself as New York/New Jersey, but it took a few years for the media and fans to catch up. The team went by just MetroStars, with no city, state or regional geographic name attached to it, a rarity in American sports.

The MetroStars bottomed out in 1999 with a record of 7–25 under former U.S. national team coach Bora Milutinović, the worst record in MLS history. Hoping to light a spark under the floundering club in 2000, the MetroStars dropped a bombshell by acquiring German international player Lothar Matthäus from Bayern Munich. Matthäus played in only 16 MLS games during the season and his tenure in the U.S. is considered a disappointment. The team did, however, leap from dead last to the conference title.

On August 26, 2000, the MetroStars' Clint Mathis set an MLS record by scoring five goals in a game against the Dallas Burn.

In 2003 the club hired new manager Bob Bradley, a New Jersey native known for winning multiple titles as an assistant with D.C. United and head coach with the Chicago Fire. Bradley led the team to the U.S. Open Cup final and a playoff berth in his first season. In 2004 the MetroStars became the first MLS team to win a trophy outside of North American soil with a victory in the La Manga Cup. The MetroStars defeated Ukraine's Dynamo Kyiv 3–2 in the semi-finals before edging Norway's Viking FK 1–0 in the final.

Bradley was fired during the 2005 season and assistant Mo Johnston was named interim head coach, guiding the team to seven points in its last three games; the MetroStars made it to the playoffs, but yet another season ended in disappointment when they were knocked out of the playoffs with a 3–2 loss to the New England Revolution.

=== Takeover by Red Bull GmbH (2006–2009) ===
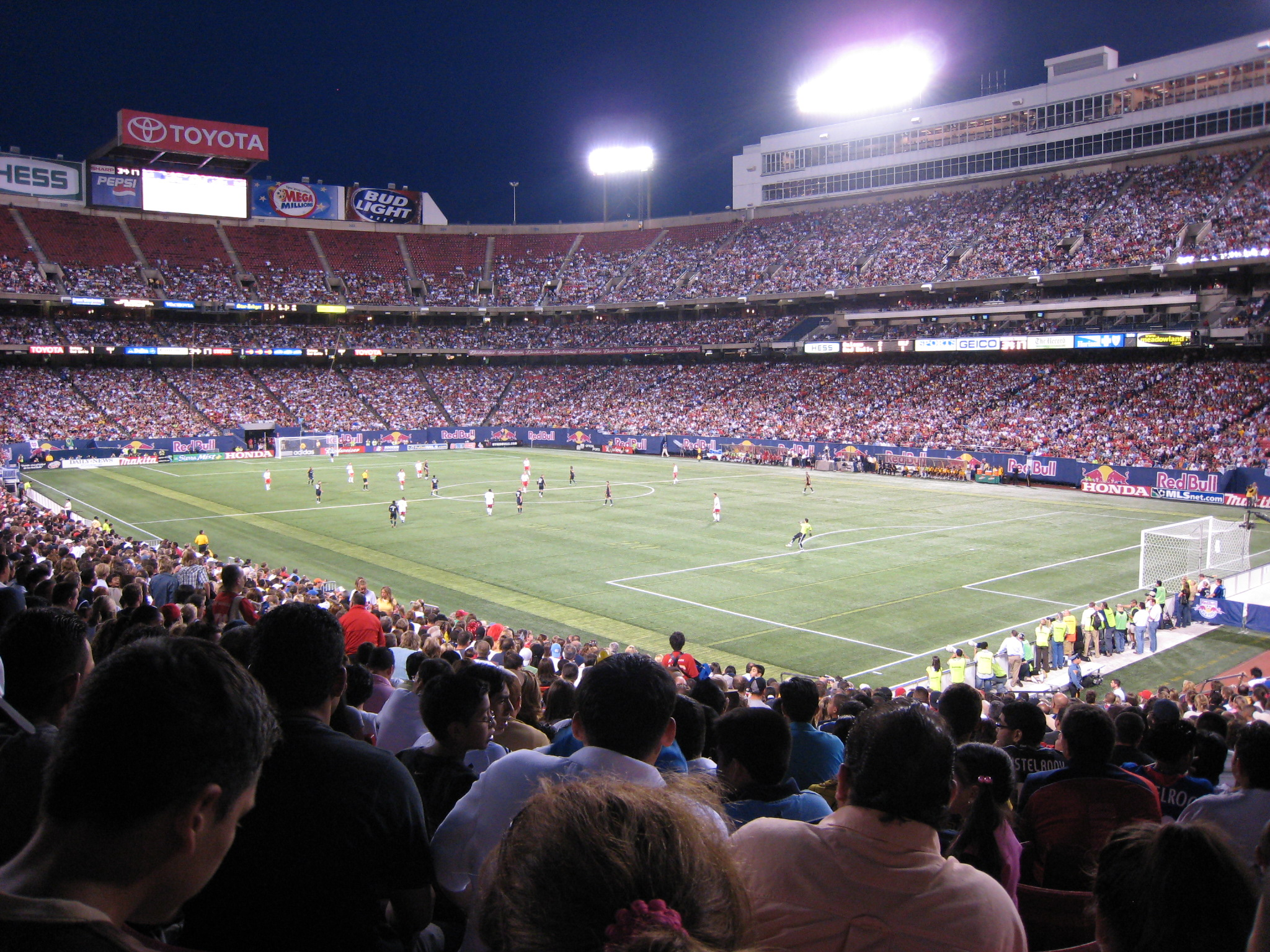
New York Red Bulls playing the L.A. Galaxy on August 18, 2007, at Giants Stadium

On March 9, 2006, it was announced that Austrian energy drink conglomerate Red Bull GmbH had purchased the club, and as part of their sponsorship, they would also completely re-brand the franchise, changing the name, colors, and logo, a move which drew mixed reactions. The club name was changed to "Red Bull New York", with the team now referred to as the "New York Red Bulls" by the league and the media.

Red Bull had originally approached MLS about creating an expansion club in New York City proper, but concerns over the cost of buying out the MetroStars' territorial rights to the region, along with the expected difficulty in securing a stadium site in the city, led the company to purchase the MetroStars instead and take over their existing stadium project in Harrison, New Jersey. The territorial rights to a second New York area franchise reverted to MLS as part of the sale.

The decision to purchase an MLS team coming from a company like Red Bull was a significant boost to the brand's reputation and publicity. Red Bull is currently known very well in the sports world due to their successful Formula 1 team, Oracle Red Bull Racing. Before Red Bull's takeover of the MetroStars in 2006, Red Bull purchased the Jaguar Racing F1 Team in 2005. This was a boost in brand awareness for Red Bull, and their strategy has turned out to have a large impact on the brand. Before its expansion to larger scale audience sports in the mid 2000's like soccer and Formula 1, Red Bull was involved with niche sporting events in the 1990's; BMX, motocross, and skiing are some examples.

During the 2006 season, Red Bull fired Johnston and hired Bruce Arena, a Brooklyn native who had recently left the head coaching role with the United States national team. The team soon after signed national team captain Claudio Reyna as a designated player along with Colombian star Juan Pablo Angel, while teenage striker Jozy Altidore emerged as one of the league's brightest young talents. That summer the Red Bulls defeated German club Bayern Munich 4–2 in a friendly at Giants Stadium and lost a friendly against Barcelona 4–1 in front of a sold-out crowd in East Rutherford. On August 18, 2007, the Red Bulls hosted the LA Galaxy for the league debut of David Beckham, drawing 66,238 fans. Arena guided the Red Bulls to the 2007 MLS playoffs, but they were eliminated in the first round by the New England Revolution. Two days later, on November 5, 2007, Arena resigned as coach of the Red Bulls. Red Bull then acquired Colombian coach Juan Carlos Osorio from Chicago Fire during the off-season.

In 2008, Altidore was sold to Spanish club Villarreal for a U.S. record transfer fee while Reyna retired due to chronic injuries in July. Over 47,000 tickets were sold to July 19 game versus the Los Angeles Galaxy, which was the team's and league's season record attendance. The game ended in a 2–2 draw with goals from Dave van den Bergh and Juan Pablo Ángel. The Red Bulls again played Spanish powerhouse Barcelona in a friendly match on August 6 before about 40,000 fans. They lost 6–2, with their goals scored by Jorge Rojas and Seth Stammler. On August 11, the Red Bulls defeated rival D.C. United in a 4–1 win, keeping the Red Bulls in the tight Eastern Conference playoff race, though United did maintain the Atlantic Cup for another year. Though they were the last team to qualify for the playoffs in the 2008 season, the Red Bulls made an impressive run, defeating two-time defending champions Houston Dynamo 4–1 on aggregate. The next week, they played Real Salt Lake in the Western Conference final at Rio Tinto Stadium in Utah. Dave van den Bergh put the Red Bulls ahead. This win put the Red Bulls into the 2008 MLS Cup final against MLS Supporters' Shield winners, the Columbus Crew. The Red Bulls lost 3–1, with their lone goal coming from John Wolyniec.

The New York Red Bulls started the 2009 season against Seattle Sounders FC at Qwest Field in Seattle. The hosts, playing in their first MLS match, won 3–0. As MLS Cup runners-up, the team also qualified for the 2009–10 CONCACAF Champions League. The New York Red Bulls took part in the tournament's second edition, starting in the qualifying round against Trinidad and Tobago side W Connection. The club drew 2–2 away to W Connection but lost 2–1 at home and were eliminated without reaching the group stage.

The club's 2009 season was highly disappointing. They went on a 16-game winless streak which lasted from May 8 to August 23. They also endured a 23-game winless streak on the road which dated back to May 10, 2008, in a 2–1 win over the LA Galaxy, in which they finished the season at 0–17–3 on the road. After the preliminary exit from the Champions League, many fans were disappointed by Osorio's rigid tactical style, while others wanted then-Sporting Director Jeff Agoos fired. On August 21, 2009, Osorio resigned from his position. Assistant Richie Williams again took over as the club's interim coach. In his second stint as interim coach, Williams led the Red Bulls to a 3–2–3 record despite finishing with a league-worst record of 5–6–19 (21 points).

=== The Backe era and new stadium (2010–2012) ===
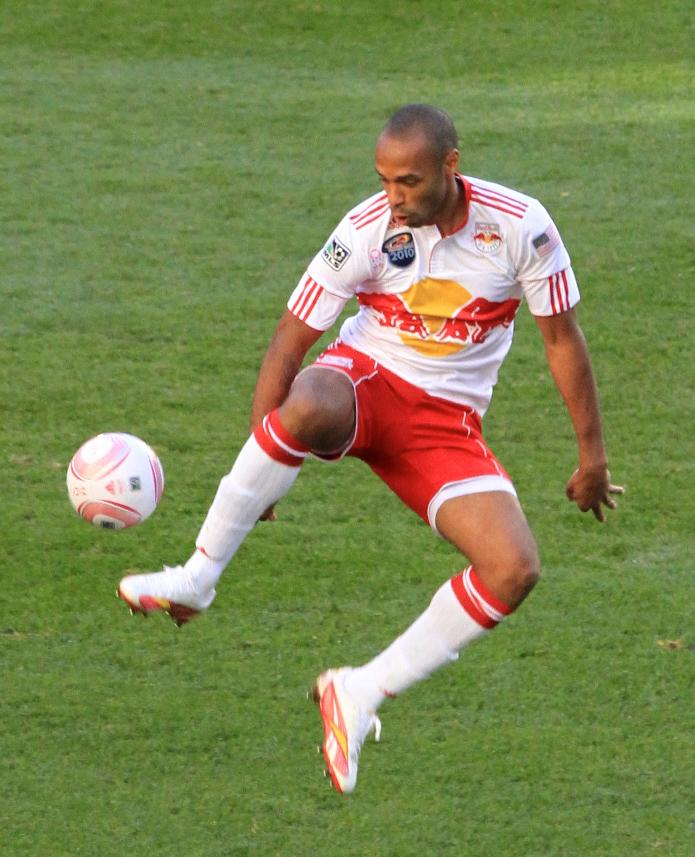
Thierry Henry was one of several high-profile signings by the Red Bulls in 2010

The 2010 season brought about a new stadium, a new sporting director and coaching staff, and a new group of players to the Red Bulls, who hoped to dramatically improve from their disappointing 2009 season. On January 7, 2010, the Red Bulls confirmed the hiring of veteran Swedish manager Hans Backe as head coach. Not long after Backe was confirmed as coach, he started to release many players signed by Osorio including Jorge Rojas, Danny Cepero, Carlos Johnson, and Walter García, while midfielder Matthew Mbuta's contract was not picked up for the 2010 season. Under the direction of Backe and newly hired Norwegian sporting director Erik Solér, the club began a new approach of signing veteran European players (mainly from Scandinavia and Britain) instead of the South American and Central American players that are usually sought after in MLS. With Backe as head coach, the Red Bulls went undefeated in the 2010 preseason, including the first ever match at Red Bull Arena against Santos of Brazil, which the Red Bulls won 3–1. In this preseason game, newly signed Estonian international midfielder Joel Lindpere became the first player to score a goal in Red Bull Arena. The Red Bulls carried this form into the first MLS match at Red Bull Arena against the Chicago Fire by winning 1–0 with the lone goal coming from Joel Lindpere. A week later, the Red Bulls defeated Seattle Sounders FC 1–0 at Qwest Field in Seattle, breaking a 27-game road winless streak.

The club signed legendary French forward Thierry Henry as a designated player in July 2010. A month later on August 2, the Red Bulls signed their third designated player, Mexican international defender Rafael Márquez. The signing of Márquez established the Red Bulls as the first MLS team to have three designated players. With these new additions, the Red Bulls improved further and clinched first place in the Eastern Conference for the first time since 2000. New York also set an MLS record for best one-season improvement, finishing with 51 points after having just 21 points the previous year. Despite the impressive turnaround, the season again ended in disappointment for the Red Bulls. The Eastern Conference semi-finals saw the Red Bulls fall to the San Jose Earthquakes. Joel Lindpere was named the season's Most Valuable Player.

Prior to the 2011 season Backe brought in a number of new European signings including Luke Rodgers, Jan Gunnar Solli, and Teemu Tainio, and announced that Thierry Henry would be the captain for the 2011 season. However the season also began with a cloud of controversy after the club fired longtime assistant coaches Richie Williams and Des McAleenan for undisclosed contract violations during training camp.

The Red Bulls opened the 2011 season sluggishly, with Henry's quiet goalscoring form and issues with set piece defending leading to a slew of winless streaks. In July the Red Bulls exited the U.S. Open Cup with a 4–0 quarterfinal loss to the Chicago Fire, drawing much negative attention from supporters due to Backe's decision to not attend the match in person and instead send a reserve squad to Chicago with assistant coach Mike Petke. Backe earned additional criticism during this period when he stated he had not been aware that he would lose so many players to summer international tournaments including the CONCACAF Gold Cup. In July the Red Bulls signed veteran German goalkeeper Frank Rost to a designated player contract to address the Red Bulls' goalkeeping woes after the struggles of Bouna Coundoul and Greg Sutton. The Red Bulls defeated PSG on the way to winning the 2011 Emirates Cup friendly tournament hosted by Arsenal in London. The Red Bulls would eventually rally to qualify for the MLS Cup playoffs but lost on aggregate in the quarterfinals to eventual champions LA Galaxy to end the 2011 season.

Backe was retained for the 2012 season and Red Bull signed Australian World Cup and Premier League veteran Tim Cahill as a designated player in July. They qualified for the MLS Cup playoffs with a third-place finish in the Eastern Conference. However, after a 1–1 draw in the first leg in D.C., and having the second leg postponed twice due to Hurricane Sandy and a major snowstorm, the Red Bulls would go on to lose their home leg 1–0 to D.C. United and were eliminated from the Eastern Conference semi-finals for the second straight year. A few hours after the loss it was announced that Hans Backe's contract with the Red Bulls would not be renewed and he had been relieved of his duties. Mike Petke, the Red Bulls' most capped player and Backe's assistant, was placed in charge of soccer operations in the interim until a replacement for could be found.

=== The Petke era and first trophy (2013–2014) ===
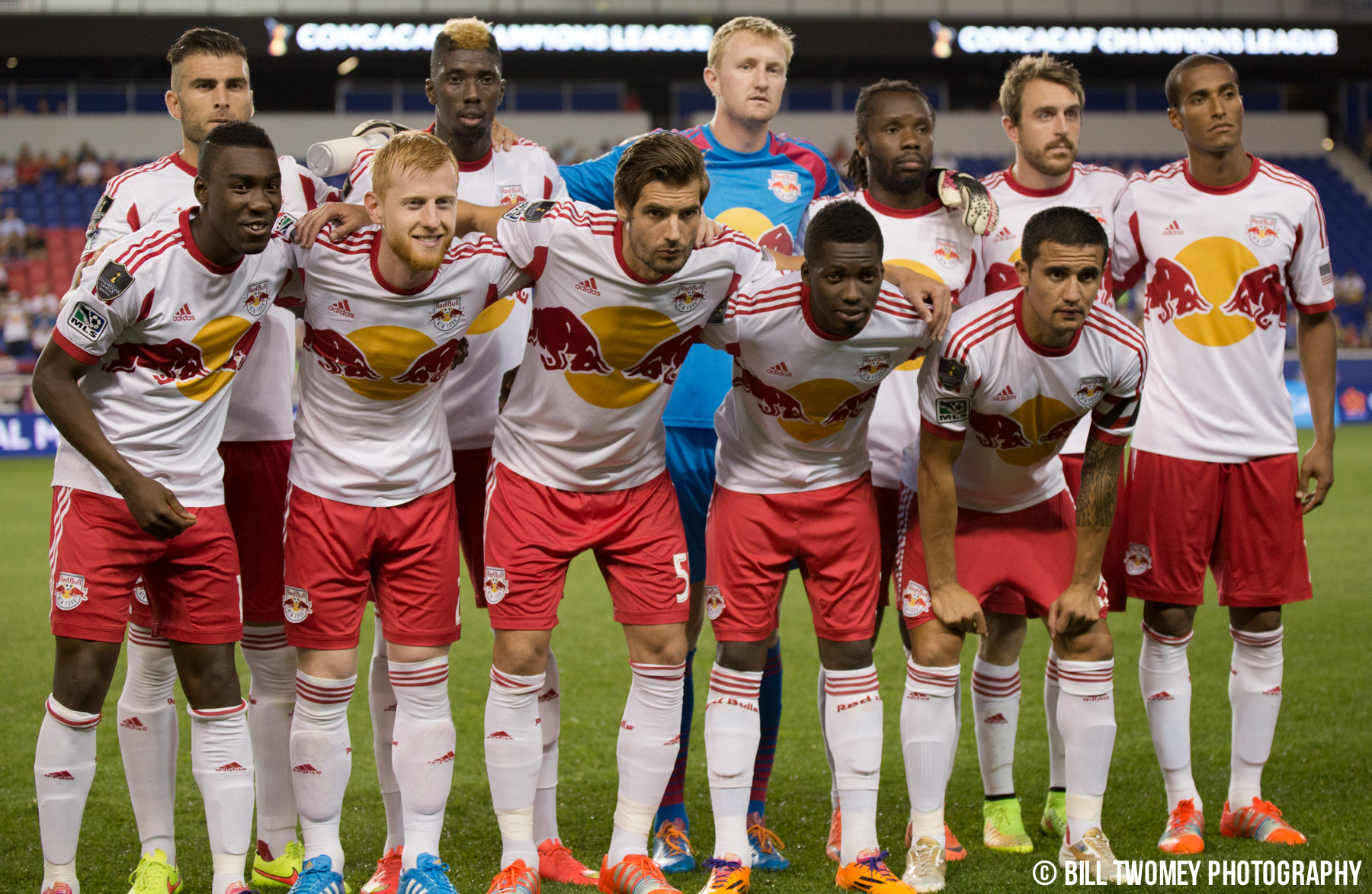
New York Red Bulls pre-game lineup photo, 2014

In the 2012–2013 off-season, a large structural overhaul occurred within the organization. In addition to Backe they parted ways with sporting director Erik Soler and brought in two people to split his former responsibilities; Andy Roxburgh was named sporting director and given responsibility for all technical and soccer operations, while Jerome de Bontin was named general manager, with an emphasis placed on corporate operations. With these changes at the top levels in place, several key players including designated player Rafael Márquez, Joel Lindpere, Kenny Cooper and Wilman Conde were either sold or traded. In an effort to revitalize the team, New York brought in players with a history of success, such as Brazilian World Cup veteran Juninho Pernambucano and former MLS Cup Champions such as Fabián Espíndola, Jámison Olave, and Kosuke Kimura.

On January 24, it was announced that Mike Petke would remain in place as the permanent head coach, removing his interim status. This marked the first time in club history the team would be coached by a former MetroStars/Red Bulls player. Petke's first season in charge began with a 3–3 draw on March 3, 2013, away to the Portland Timbers. Petke showed a knack for making adjustments when he countered a slow 0–2–2 start by switching the formation from a 4–2–3–1 formation to a 4–4–2 – placing more emphasis on playing a strong defensive game, and playing up through the midfield. The rookie manager sought to turn the club around, and gain his first win by the end of the month. On March 30, 2013, he did just that against the Philadelphia Union, by the score of 2–1.

Petke sought to instill a more aggressive mindset into the team to make up for the relative lack of time the team had spent playing together. Some have called the team "mentally weak" due to how the team has fluctuated between scrappy play and impressive displays of form and moments of "playing down to" inferior teams. However, after putting on impressive displays, the team went on a two-month undefeated streak and won the 2013 Supporters' Shield as the team with the best regular-season record. This win also secured the top seed and home-field advantage in the MLS Cup post-season tournament.

In the 2014 season, the Red Bulls qualified for the 2014 MLS playoffs, and eliminated Sporting Kansas City in the knockout round of the playoffs, advancing to face D.C. United. The Red Bulls made it to the Eastern Conference final to face the New England Revolution, but were defeated. The club lost two of their designated players when it announced that Thierry Henry would retire following the season, while Tim Cahill was released during the offseason.

=== Jesse Marsch, Ali Curtis and "Energy Drink Soccer" (2015–2018) ===
On December 23, 2014, former MLS player and league office executive Ali Curtis replaced the retiring Andy Roxburgh as Sporting Director. In a surprise announcement two weeks later on January 7, 2015, Petke was released as head coach and replaced with former Montreal Impact coach Jesse Marsch. Tension between the fans and the front office came to a head at a hectic town hall featuring Curtis, Marsch, goalkeeper Luis Robles and emcee and sportswriter Frank Isola.

The target was to implement, on the pitch, a high pressing style used by the other Red Bull Global teams under Ralf Rangnick, all the way down to the academy. Marsch once said the team would play like "an energy drink," which was derided but "Energy Drink Soccer" became a way for the fanbase to describe the way in which they preferred the club play.

In his first season with Red Bulls, Marsch implemented a high-pressure tactical system built around the talents of recently signed players such as Sacha Kljestan, Mike Grella, Felipe Martins and a returning Bradley Wright-Phillips, while academy product Matt Miazga emerged as a key defender, eventually being signed by English club Chelsea following the season. The Red Bulls won their second Supporter's Shield, qualifying for the 2015 MLS playoffs and reaching the Eastern Conference Final where they were ultimately defeated by the Columbus Crew.

On May 21, 2016, the team tied an MLS record for largest victory margin, winning 7–0 at New York City FC. Marsch signed a multi-year extension in June 2016. At the end of July, Wright-Phillips became the club's all-time leading goal scorer, passing Henry on his way to a total he'd eventually double in New York. On September 27, 2016, the Red Bulls qualified for their first ever CONCACAF Champions League knockout stage with a 0–0 draw at Guatemalan club Antigua GFC. The playoffs were a disappointment, however, as the top-seeded Red Bulls fell in the conference semifinals to Montreal.

Prior to the 2017 season, Curtis left the club under confusing circumstances, with the club saying that he and the rest of management failed "to work through differing views" and was replaced by Denis Hamlett. Earlier in the transfer window, the team had sold captain and longest-tenured player Dax McCarty to the Chicago Fire for allocation money. with McCarty saying of Curtis that "it's clear for everyone to see that he's no longer a part of the decision-making process going on at the Red Bulls."

What followed was an up and down season for New York, highlighted by the emergence of homegrown talent Tyler Adams. The team defeated New York City, Philadelphia, New England and then-second tier Cincinnati before falling in the 2017 U.S. Open Cup Final to Sporting Kansas City, the second time the club had reached the final. The club opened the season with a poor showing in the 2016-17 CONCACAF Champions League knockout stage, losing at the round of 16 to Vancouver Whitecaps FC.

The league campaign was mixed, with a sixth-place conference finish and a resounding 4–0 win over former captain McCarty's Chicago Fire to start the postseason, but what followed was a quarterfinal exit to Toronto FC despite Wright-Phillips scoring his 100th goal for the club in all competitions in a victorious second leg.

The club had arguably its most successful season in 2018, despite upheaval during the season. The club won its third Supporters' Shield and reached the semifinals of both the MLS Cup Playoffs and the CONCACAF Champions League.

New York made their best showing to date in continental competition the next year in the 2018 CONCACAF Champions League, which they had qualified for with their regular season efforts in 2016, with the group stage having been eliminated. In the quarterfinal against Club Tijuana, they became the first MLS club to win by multiple goals on Mexican soil, with a 2–0 defeat of Tijuana in the quarterfinals on a brace from Wright-Phillips and 13 saves by Robles.

In the return leg, new designated player and record signing Kaku scored on his debut off the bench as the Red Bulls won 3–1 for a 5–1 victory in the tie in Harrison.

In the semifinals, New York, despite outshooting Mexican giants Chivas 20–1 in the home second leg, were beaten by a goal in the first leg that resigned the Red Bulls to a 1–0 loss in the tie.

Days before the third Hudson River Derby of the 2018 MLS season, it was announced that Marsch would leave his role as coach effective immediately, joining Ralf Rangnick at the club's Bundesliga sister RB Leipzig, with assistant coach Chris Armas taking over. Marsch left the club as the most successful coach in its history, winning the Supporters' Shield, topping the Eastern Conference twice and a runner-up finish in the 2017 U.S. Open Cup. He remains New York's winningest coach.

=== The third Supporters Shield and the Armas era (2018–2020) ===
Initially, Armas continued to steer the ship well, as the Red Bulls won their third Supporters' Shield in the 2018 after winning their last five games to overtake Atlanta United in a tight race on the season's final day, while setting what was then a record for points in a season and securing qualification for the 2019 CONCACAF Champions League. Atlanta got revenge on New York in the Eastern Conference Finals, which they won 3–1 over two legs after a controversial offside call that denied Wright-Phillips an away goal in the first leg.

Wright-Phillips became the fastest player to 100 MLS goals in the history of the league after scoring against DC United on July 25, 2018, all 100 scored with New York. The Englishman finished the season with 20 goals in the league, becoming the first player in MLS history to achieve the feat three times.

Tyler Adams was sold to RB Leipzig in January 2019 for a sum of $3,000,000 and 33% of any future transfer earnings.

New York stumbled through a middling 2019 season, with Wright-Phillips spending most of it injured. In his place, 20 different Red Bulls registered at least a goal, a club record when counting Wright-Phillips as 21. After easing past Atlético Pantoja, their run in the 2019 CONCACAF Champions League was abruptly ended by Santos Laguna in the quarterfinals. New York finished 6th in the East and despite holding a 3–1 lead at halftime, fell in the first round of the 2019 MLS Cup Playoffs to Philadelphia Union in extra time 4–3.

Luis Robles, the player who'd played the most times for the club in their history and Bradley Wright-Phillips, the player who'd scored the most goals in their history, departed in the offseason.

Sean Davis became the club's first academy product to be named captain ahead of the 2020 season, the fifth native of New Jersey to wear the armband.

Armas, having had a rough start to the COVID-19-impacted 2020 campaign – including a crashing out at the group stage of the MLS is Back Tournament – was formally released from his contract, along with assistant CJ Brown on September 4, 2020, via statement released from Kevin Thelwell, RBNY's Head of Sport who had come over in early 2020 from Wolverhampton Wanderers. Bradley Carnell was named as interim manager the day after.

The second half of the 2020 season was notable for the emergence of teenage midfielder Caden Clark, who scored on his debut, second appearance and postseason debut. Clark was sold to RB Leipzig, though he was loaned back to New York in the two seasons to follow. New York recovered to an extent, qualifying for the playoffs under Carnell.

=== Gerhard Struber era (2020–2023) ===
Kevin Thelwell hired former Barnsley manager (and former Red Bull Salzburg player and youth coach) Gerhard Struber as the club's new manager on October 6, 2020. Due to delays driven largely by the COVID-19 pandemic, Struber was unable to make his debut until the Red Bulls, under Carnell's direction, made the 2020 MLS Cup Playoffs, where Struber oversaw a 3–2 away loss to Columbus. Carnell left the club altogether ahead of the 2022 season to become head coach of expansion St. Louis City SC.

Thelwell and Struber largely rebuilt the roster for the 2021 MLS season, signing 12 new players from a mix of European and South American clubs, as well as an academy product, Bento Estrela, who became the club's youngest-ever signing the day before his 15th birthday. New York also used two loan players from Red Bull Salzburg – including goalkeeper Carlos Miguel Coronel – and signed former Celtic forward Patryk Klimala as a designated player.

New York struggled for a good portion of the 2021 season with injuries including a ruptured achilles from US international Aaron Long, but put together a 7–1–4 finish to the season to qualify for their 12th consecutive playoffs. The Red Bulls were defeated in the opening round by the Philadelphia Union, 1–0 on a goal in the 123rd minute.

In the offseason, former Salzburg loanee Coronel, considered by most to be the team's best player in 2021, was brought back on a permanent contract. The club also bought Lewis Morgan from Inter Miami CF for $1.2 million in targeted allocation money. Davis departed on a free agent contract to Nashville SC.

On the day before the beginning of the 2022 season, Thelwell departed to take over as director of football at Everton. His final transfer window saw Brazilian Luquinhas brought in from Legia Warsaw and Englishman Ashley Fletcher on loan from Watford. Clark and defender Tom Edwards also returned on loan deals.

With Long returning from injury and made captain following Davis' departure, New York began the 2022 season tying an MLS record set by the 1998 Los Angeles Galaxy, winning their first five league games on the road. In addition, Red Bulls went six matches undefeated away in the league and eight in all competitions to start 2022. Conversely, the club was winless in their first six home matches in 2022, before an Open Cup victory over Charlotte FC on May 25.

The Charlotte win sparked a solid cup run that season, as New York reached the semifinals, defeating Hartford Athletic, D.C. United, Charlotte FC, and New York City before crashing out with a 5–1 loss to Orlando City.

Former VfB Stuttgart, Schalke 04, and Red Bull Global director Jochen Schneider replaced Thelwell as Head of Sport on June 11. His first major hire was to bring over Sebastian Häusl from Salzburg as the club's Head of Scouting.

New York qualified for the MLS Cup Playoffs for a 13th-consecutive season, equalling a league record set by Seattle and, with Seattle missing the playoffs in 2022, giving the Red Bulls the active league record. New York lost to FC Cincinnati in the first round of the playoffs.

The club followed with a less active offseason, signing ex-Philadelphia Union striker Cory Burke in December 2022. They also announced the homegrown signings of defenders Curtis Ofori, Peter Stroud and Jayden Reid. The club also confirmed 2022 loan signing Elias Manoel on a permanent transfer.

Long's departure via free agency was announced on January 3, 2023. Long Island-born center back Sean Nealis was named captain, the first New York-born player to wear the armband.

The Red Bulls spent a reported $5.3 million to sign forward Dante Vanzeir from Belgian side Union SG as a designated player. The fee could potentially rise with add-ons to break the club record spend. To make room, the club offloaded Klimala to Hapoel Be'er Sheva.

Vanzeir was suspended for six games for uttering a racial slur during open play against the San Jose Earthquakes on April 8. All three of the club's supporters groups voted for and staged a walkout of the match against Houston on April 15, deeming Vanzeir's suspension to be insufficient and demanding further consequences for both the player and Struber, who refused to substitute the player out of the game. Empire Supporters Club continued to protest inside the stadium at Struber's final match, a 1–0 loss to Philadelphia Union on May 6.

At that point, the club had won just one of its first 11 games in 2023. New York announced they were mutually parting ways with Struber on May 8, with Struber claiming he'd expressed a desire to leave by the end of the season. Despite New York saying it was a joint decision between the club and Struber, his sides had won just two of his final 15 matches at the helm. Schneider claimed that his handling of the Vanzeir incident had no effect on Struber's job status.

Assistant coach Troy Lesesne was named as Struber's replacement on a full-time basis the same day as Struber's firing. Schneider promised that he would remain head coach for at least the remainder of the 2023 season.

Lesesne led the club to the Round of 16 in both the 2023 U.S. Open Cup and the inaugural Leagues Cup, losing on penalties at that stage in both. The club was able to rescue their season with a run of three consecutive wins to end the season. A stoppage time penalty by John Tolkin clinched New York's spot in the 2023 MLS Cup Playoffs, continuing a North American sports current record-setting run of 14 straight years making the postseason. Red Bulls beat Charlotte FC 5–2 in the Wild Card round, led by a free kick goal by Tolkin and a hat trick for Elias Manoel, the first in the club's postseason history.

New York were eliminated by Cincinnati for a second straight season in the Conference Quarterfinals, as Cincinnati swept the Red Bulls in two games, with Game 2 going to a 10-round penalty shootout. The loss meant that New York lost out on penalties to end all three of its competitions in 2023. Despite the improvement over Struber, Lesesne and assistant coach Zach Prince were both let go at the end of the season, as was sporting director Denis Hamlett.

=== Sandro Schwarz era (2024–2025) ===
New York named former 1. FSV Mainz 05, FC Dynamo Moscow and Hertha BSC manager Sandro Schwarz the 20th head coach in club history on December 14, 2023. Two days later, on December 16, the Red Bulls signed RB Leipzig midfielder and Sweden international Emil Forsberg as a designated player. Former Canadian international Julian de Guzman was named sporting director on February 2.

The offseason saw several departures, as Luquinhas was sold to Fortaleza Esporte Clube, Tom Barlow and Dru Yearwood were sold to Chicago Fire FC and Nashville SC, respectively, while Omir Fernandez left as a free agent.

The club signed Swedish U-21 international Noah Eile, Norwegian youth international Dennis Gjengaar, as well as homegrown Roald Mitchell, while re-signing Dylan Nealis and Daniel Edelman to new contracts and exercising a purchase option to bring back Kyle Duncan.

Forsberg was named the club captain ahead of the season, demoting Sean Nealis to vice-captain. Goalkeeper Carlos Coronel was named as a second vice-captain. Schwarz's first victory for the club came on March 2 away at Houston Dynamo. Academy product Julian Hall became the club's youngest-ever goal scorer and the league's second youngest on June 19, 2024, getting an equalizer against CF Montréal 16 years and 87 days old.

Despite poor form in the second half of the 2024 season and in the 2024 Leagues Cup, the Red Bulls qualified for the playoffs, extending their record consecutive postseasons streak to 15 years.

New York upset defending MLS Cup champions Columbus Crew in the first round of the 2024 MLS Cup Playoffs, considered by some to be the biggest upset in the league's post-season history. The Red Bulls won Game 2 of their series in a penalty shootout at Red Bull Arena after several saves by Coronel and a decisive winner from academy graduate Daniel Edelman.

In the Eastern Conference Semifinal, New York defeated New York City in the first ever post-season derby between the clubs. Summer DP signing Felipe Carballo and Vanzier both scored. In the Eastern Conference Final, New York traveled to face Orlando City SC, where they defeated the Lions 1–0 on a goal by Andres Reyes, sending the club to its second-ever MLS Cup Final against LA Galaxy. They would fall to the Galaxy, 2–1, with Sean Nealis providing their only goal.

New York immediately began to tinker with a roster that, despite a lengthy MLS Cup run, had finished mid-table. The Red Bulls signed Eric Maxim Choupo-Moting to a DP contract, as well as Wiktor Bogacz from Miedź Legnica, former Mainz center back Alexander Hack, Chilean left back Marcelo Morales and MLS veterans Raheem Edwards and Tim Parker, who returned to the club for a second stint. Reyes and Elias Manoel were sold to San Diego FC and Real Salt Lake, respectively, and John Tolkin was sold to Holstein Kiel.

On May 10, 2025, for a second time, the team tied an MLS record for largest margin of victory with a 7–0 win against LA Galaxy at home.

Following that match against Los Angeles, New York finished the season with just seven wins in 22 matches and failed to make the postseason for the first time since 2009. At the end of the season, Schneider chose to leave the club and it was announced Schwarz would also not return, with Sporting Director Julian de Guzman announced as his replacement in what New York termed a 'long-term succession plan.'

=== Michael Bradley era (2026–present) ===
New York announced that New Jersey native, former MetroStar and ex-United States captain Michael Bradley would become the team's new head coach in December 2025, having spent the second half of the 2025 season guiding the club's second team to an MLS Next Pro championship.

== Nicknames, colors and badge ==
The club is colloquially referred to as RBNY (short for Red Bull New York) and by fans, particularly those in Empire Supporters Club, as Metro, in honor of the original MetroStars name. The club itself often markets the team as playing "for the Metro".

The team's original crest was a stylized "M" in front of a city skyline. For the 2003 season, a new crest was introduced featuring the MetroStars wordmark in front of a "three-sided shield" intended to represent the tri-state area of New York, New Jersey, and Connecticut. After Red Bull purchased and renamed the team, the badge was switched to the familiar Red Bull logo.

During the team's first seasons, the MetroStars had solid black or solid white jerseys, before switching to a home jerseys featuring red and black vertical stripes (similar to those worn by A.C. Milan). Since the Red Bull takeover, the team has almost invariably worn white shirts with red shorts at home while using a combination of navy blue and yellow for road kits, each with a prominent Red Bull logo across the chest. Prior to the 2018 season, the club unveiled a new entirely red shirt, replacing the traditional blue-yellow secondary kit.

In 2024, for the first time since the MetroStars era, the club debuted a kit that somewhat resembled the red and black stripes known as the 'Legacy Kit.'

== Stadium ==
Opening day at Red Bull Arena against Santos FC, March 20, 2010

Name	Location	Years
Giants Stadium	East Rutherford, New Jersey	1996–2009
Columbia Soccer Stadium	Manhattan, New York	1997; 1 match in U.S. Open Cup
Yurcak Field	Piscataway, New Jersey	1999, 2003; 3 matches in U.S. Open Cup
Mitchel Athletic Complex	Uniondale, New York	2000, 2002; 3 matches in U.S. Open Cup
Sports Illustrated Stadium	Harrison, New Jersey	2010–present
MSU Soccer Park at Pittser Field	Montclair, New Jersey	2019, 2022, 2023; 3 matches in U.S. Open Cup

The team is headquartered and plays their home matches at Sports Illustrated Stadium in Harrison, New Jersey, which opened for the 2010 MLS season. The stadium has a seating capacity of 25,189. On March 20, 2010, the Red Bull team played an exhibition game against Santos FC in a 3–1 inaugural win. The first MLS league game took place in the new venue on March 27, 2010, with a 1–0 win over the Chicago Fire, the lone goal coming from Estonian international Joel Lindpere. Since opening in 2010, the Red Bulls have been dominant at Sports Illustrated Stadium with the most wins and points at home for the best home record in MLS. The performance of the team at home has given the stadium the nickname of "The Fortress".

In 2019, 2022 and 2023, the club sporadically used MSU Soccer Park, home of New York Red Bulls II, for U.S. Open Cup matches when Red Bull Arena was unavailable.

The team played at Giants Stadium in East Rutherford, New Jersey, from 1996 until the end of the 2009 season.

=== Training facility ===
In 2021, the club announced plans to build a new, 80-acre (32 ha), privately funded training facility in Morris Township. The RWJBarnabas Health Red Bulls Performance Center broke ground in December 2023 and opened ahead of the 2026 FIFA World Cup in April 2026 with the Brazil national football team using it as its home base and training facility during the tournament.

The $100 million facility, designed by Gensler, is one of the largest in North America and features eight full sized training pitches, with five heated fields and one turf field, and space for the first team, second team and academy all under one roof. Additional features include an innovation lab, a 4,635 sq ft (430.6 m^{2}) weight room with windows that overlook the training pitch, a lounge for first-team players, academic spaces for academy players and a dining hall serving food from professional chefs.

==== Former training facilities ====
In the past, the Red Bulls led a nomadic existence, making use of several other training grounds before finishing construction of their first purpose-built facility:

- Kean University East Campus (1996–2002)
  - Saint Benedict's Preparatory School (2002)
- Giants Stadium (2003–2007)
- Montclair State University (2007–2013)

===== Hanover training facility =====
The club's prior training facility was located in Hanover Township, New Jersey, and opened in June 2013. The $6 million facility covers about 15 acres of the 73 acre property and includes four fields, three grass and one turf, each the size of the one at Sports Illustrated Stadium. The middle field, which has a grass surface, is heated, while one turf field has lights.

The complex opened with four buildings, with the main one housing separate locker rooms for the senior team, academy teams and coaching staff, film analysis room, offices, a therapy room, a gym, a fitness/wellness area, a hot/cold tub room and a players' lounge, which includes a cafeteria that serves breakfast and lunch. In April 2015, the team opened a new 4,000 sq ft (370 m^{2}) training building, which includes two team locker rooms, a multipurpose weight and cardio area, a treatment room, exam room, coach and staff lockers, lavatories for both men and women and other miscellaneous areas. In 2017, the team opened a 3,500 sq ft (330 m^{2}) extension of the 2015 training building for the academy team and the third grass field.

In 2026, Gotham FC of the National Women's Soccer League (NWSL) announced that they will move into, expand and renovate the complex as their own training facility.

== Club culture ==
=== Supporters ===
New York Red Bulls supporter section

A variety of supporters clubs and groups have grown around the team since its inaugural year. The first of these was formed in 1995, prior to the inception of the team itself, as the Empire Supporters Club. In early 2005, MetroNation was formed and became the club's second officially recognized supporter's group. 2005 also saw the creation of the New Jersey–based Garden State Supporters, eventually known as the Garden State Ultras (GSU). The 2010 season's influx of personnel with a Scandinavian background led to the creation of the Viking Army Supporters Club. In 2021, after GSU had received a stadium ban, a new supporters group named Torcida 96 was formed.

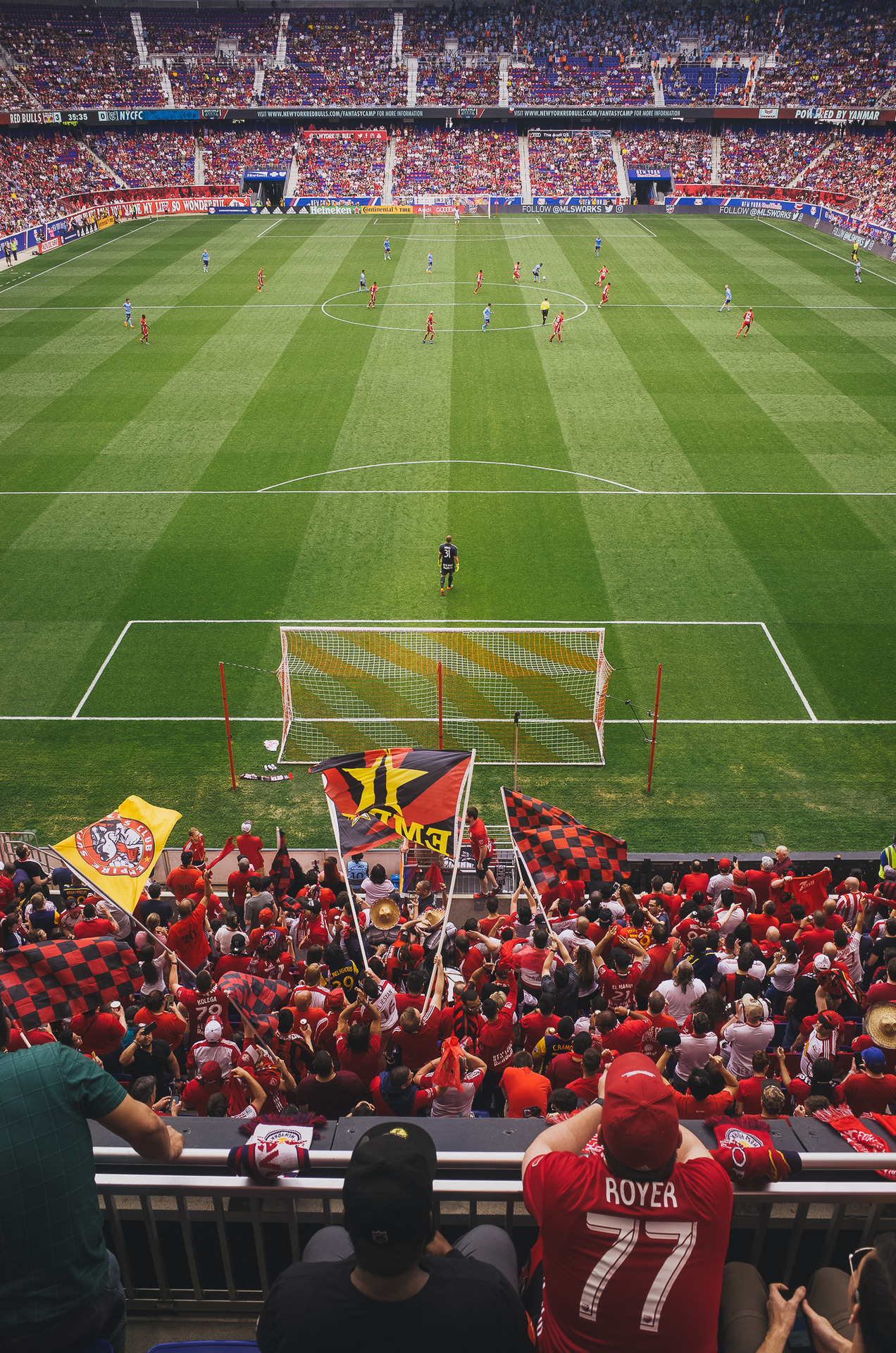
Sports Illustrated Stadium during a Hudson River Derby Match

The Red Bulls have designated some sections of Sports Illustrated Stadium as supporter specific. These included sections 101 for the Empire Supporters Club, 102 for the Viking Army, and 133 for Torcida 96. Sections 133, 101, and 102 are collectively known as the "South Ward". In 2019, the club remodeled the South Ward as 'safe-standing' sections.

The groups organize away trips to every match, often chartering buses to games in New England, Philadelphia and Washington, as well as special subway trips to derbies at New York City. ESC also holds multiple watch parties for each away games at bars in Manhattan and New Jersey. Both ESC and Viking Army traditionally hold a tailgate in the parking lot outside Sports Illustrated Stadium before every home match, while Torcida meet at The Greenroom in Harrison, with all three combining in the parking lot to complete the march to the match.

Red Bull GmbH became the target of a supporter campaign after Petke's dismissal, highlighted by a billboard alongside Interstate 280 near the stadium that showed Petke lifting the Supporters' Shield above the slogans "#RedBullOut" and "Our Legend, Our Club".

=== Rivalries ===
The Red Bulls' oldest rival is D.C. United, against whom they compete for the Atlantic Cup. The New England Revolution too are another fierce rival the Red Bulls have a derby with called the I-95 derby. The Red Bulls had not defeated the Revolution at the latter's home venue Gillette Stadium for 12 years, until a 2–0 win on June 8, 2014, intensifying the rivalry. That same year, the two met in the Eastern Conference Championship, where New England eliminated New York to advance. These rivalries arise out of geographic proximity and as a reflection of longstanding rivalries between New York-area teams and other teams in Washington, D.C., Boston, and Philadelphia. During the late 2000s and early 2010s, battles between New York and the Los Angeles Galaxy were called the '1% Derby' given the teams' extravagant spending compared to the rest of the league.

The rivalry between the New York Red Bulls and D.C. United came to a head on April 22, 2006. D.C. United player Alecko Eskandarian, after scoring a goal, ran to his bench, drank a Red Bull, and spit it out. Fans of the New York Red Bulls were outraged, adding to the already heated rivalry between the two teams.

In 2015 the Hudson River Derby was born when the Red Bulls faced off against another team from the New York metropolitan area in MLS league play for the first time, when New York City FC entered MLS. Although initially regarded as a manufactured rivalry with little of the traditional banter apparent between long-time local rivals, the first meetings between the teams displayed an increasing level of animosity between the two sides. The Red Bulls won the first ever encounter between the two, a league game on May 10, 2015, at Sports Illustrated Stadium. Matches between the two teams were marred by a series of brawls between their supporters.

Although the rivalry with NYCFC was built to be the major one for the Red Bulls, this was not the first time that they played against teams from the New York area, as they played matches in the U.S. Open Cup in both 2011 (against F.C. New York, who have since folded) and 2014 (against the New York Cosmos). The Red Bulls also played against the Cosmos in the 2015 U.S. Open Cup, to a 4–1 victory.

The rivalry between the New York Red Bulls and New York City FC, although assumed to be entertaining and high-pressure, was a very one-sided rivalry in its early years. In the early stages of this rivalry the New York Red Bulls were very dominant, which meant that this hypothetical battle for New York City was not much of a rivalry and more of a one-sided battle. After the Red Bulls' significant 7–0 win over New York City FC in 2016, the Red Bulls had won all four matchups between the two teams, outscoring New York City FC by a whopping twelve goals. In 2015, the Red Bulls finished at 18–10–6 with the best record in the Eastern Conference, while New York City FC finished eighth in the conference with a 10–17–7 record. Along with the Red Bulls winning the first four matchups, the Red Bulls went on to win 6 of the first 7 matchups, which lasted until mid-2017, when NYCFC started picking up some more wins. Although the Red Bulls had dominated the rivalry early on, as time goes on New York City FC continues growth and the playing field between the two clubs starts trending towards being even. The overall record between the two teams' 32 matchups includes the New York Red Bulls with 16 wins, New York City FC with 12 wins, and 4 draws. This shows that since the first four games which were dominated by the Red Bulls, it has been perfectly even with 12 wins for each club.

Supporters groups from both clubs created the Hudson River Derby Foundation in 2019. In 2023, a trophy, awarded to whomever came out on top during the league meetings between the two teams, was unveiled. The Red Bulls won the first edition of the trophy with a 1–0 win and 0–0 draw against NYC during league play.

=== Mascot ===
The New York Red Bulls debuted their mascot REDD during a home match against FC Cincinnati on July 20, 2024. REDD is a youthful and energetic red bull who entertains the fans during the games and around the tri-state area. He usually wears sunglasses and a hat, and skateboards around the stadium during game days. REDD can be found outside at the Bullevard, a pregame kickoff event with activations, and can be seen in the sections during the game.

== Broadcasting ==
From its inception as the MetroStars in 1996, Red Bulls matches were televised by MSG and MSG Plus. Joe Tolleson (play-by-play) and Tommy Smyth (analyst) were the original announcers. Derek Rae and JP Dellacamera followed as play-by-play announcers. From 2012 to 2022, Steve Cangialosi (play-by-play) and Shep Messing (analyst) were the MSG/MSG Plus announcers.

In 2015, the Red Bulls launched streaming audio game broadcasts from the club's official site, with play-by-play man Matt Harmon and former MetroStar and Red Bull Steve Jolley on the English-language call, and Ernesto Motta in Spanish. Late in 2015, the club launched a streaming internet station with TuneIn, becoming the first MLS club to provide 24-hour streaming content to its fan base. Stefano Fusaro replaced Motta in 2021 but departed ahead of the 2023 season.

From 2023, every Red Bulls match is available via MLS Season Pass on the Apple TV app. The service features contributions from Cangialosi, Fusaro and Messing, as well as former New York players Sacha Kljestan, Bradley Wright-Phillips, Dax McCarty, Lloyd Sam and Heath Pearce. Harmon and Jolley can be listened to on the Apple TV broadcast for every home match and often host weekly features previewing and recapping matches on the service.

== Players and staff ==
=== Roster ===
As of October 10, 2026

Note: Flags indicate national team as defined under FIFA eligibility rules; some limited exceptions apply. Players may hold more than one non-FIFA nationality.

No.	Pos.	Nation	Player
1	GK	USA	AJ Marcucci
2	DF	USA	Justin Che
3	DF	CAN	Jahkeele Marshall-Rutty
5	DF	PAN	Omar Valencia
6	DF	GER	Robert Voloder
7	FW	USA	Cade Cowell (on loan from Guadalajara)
8	MF	HON	David Ruiz (on loan from Inter Miami)
10	MF	SWE	Emil Forsberg (captain)
11	FW	MEX	Jorge Ruvalcaba
12	DF	USA	Dylan Nealis
13	FW	CMR	Eric Maxim Choupo-Moting
14	DF	COL	Julián Bazán
15	MF	USA	Adri Mehmeti
16	FW	USA	Julian Hall
17	FW	USA	Cameron Harper

No.	Pos.	Nation	Player
20	DF	COL	Juan José Mina
26	DF	USA	Tim Parker
34	GK	USA	Ethan Horvath
37	MF	GHA	Mohammed Sofo
39	MF	ARG	Nehuén Benedetti
48	MF	GHA	Ronald Donkor
56	DF	USA	Matthew Dos Santos
60	MF	MLI	Sekou Koné
66	FW	USA	Tanner Rosborough
70	FW	CRC	Andy Rojas
77	GK	USA	John McCarthy
79	MF	PAN	Rafael Mosquera
91	FW	PAN	Mijahir Jiménez
92	FW	USA	Dennis Nelich

=== Out on loan ===
Note: Flags indicate national team as defined under FIFA eligibility rules; some limited exceptions apply. Players may hold more than one non-FIFA nationality.

No.	Pos.	Nation	Player
9	FW	POL	Wiktor Bogacz (on loan to Cracovia)
14	DF	CHI	Marcelo Morales (on loan to Universidad de Chile)
21	GK	USA	Aidan Stokes (on loan to Brentford)

No.	Pos.	Nation	Player
33	FW	TTO	Roald Mitchell (on loan to Viborg)
81	FW	USA	Serge Ngoma (on loan to Birmingham Legion)
88	MF	ANT	Aiden Jarvis (on loan to Huntsville City FC)

=== Retired numbers ===
- 99 – (England) Bradley Wright-Phillips (forward, 2013–2019, 2022)

=== Legends Row ===
- Luis Robles
- Bradley Wright-Phillips

=== Technical staff ===
As of November 26, 2025

Position	Name
Sporting Director	(Canada) Julian de Guzman
Head coach	(United States) Michael Bradley
Assistant Coach	(Uganda) Ibrahim Sekagya (United States) Mike Sorber
Goalkeeping Coach	(United States) Jeremy Proud
Tactical Performance Analyst	(United States) Kyle Stump
Head of Medical	(England) Chris Moseley
Head of Player Personnel	(United States) Sam Goldberg
Director, Team Operations	(United States) Scott Bernstein
Head of Strength and Conditioning	(France) Tony Jouaux
Equipment Manager	(Canada) Cortlin Tonn

=== Administrative officials ===
As of February 22, 2025

Position	Name
Red Bull New York General Manager	(Canada) Marc de Grandpré
Head of Red Bull Global Soccer	(Germany) Jürgen Klopp

== Player development ==
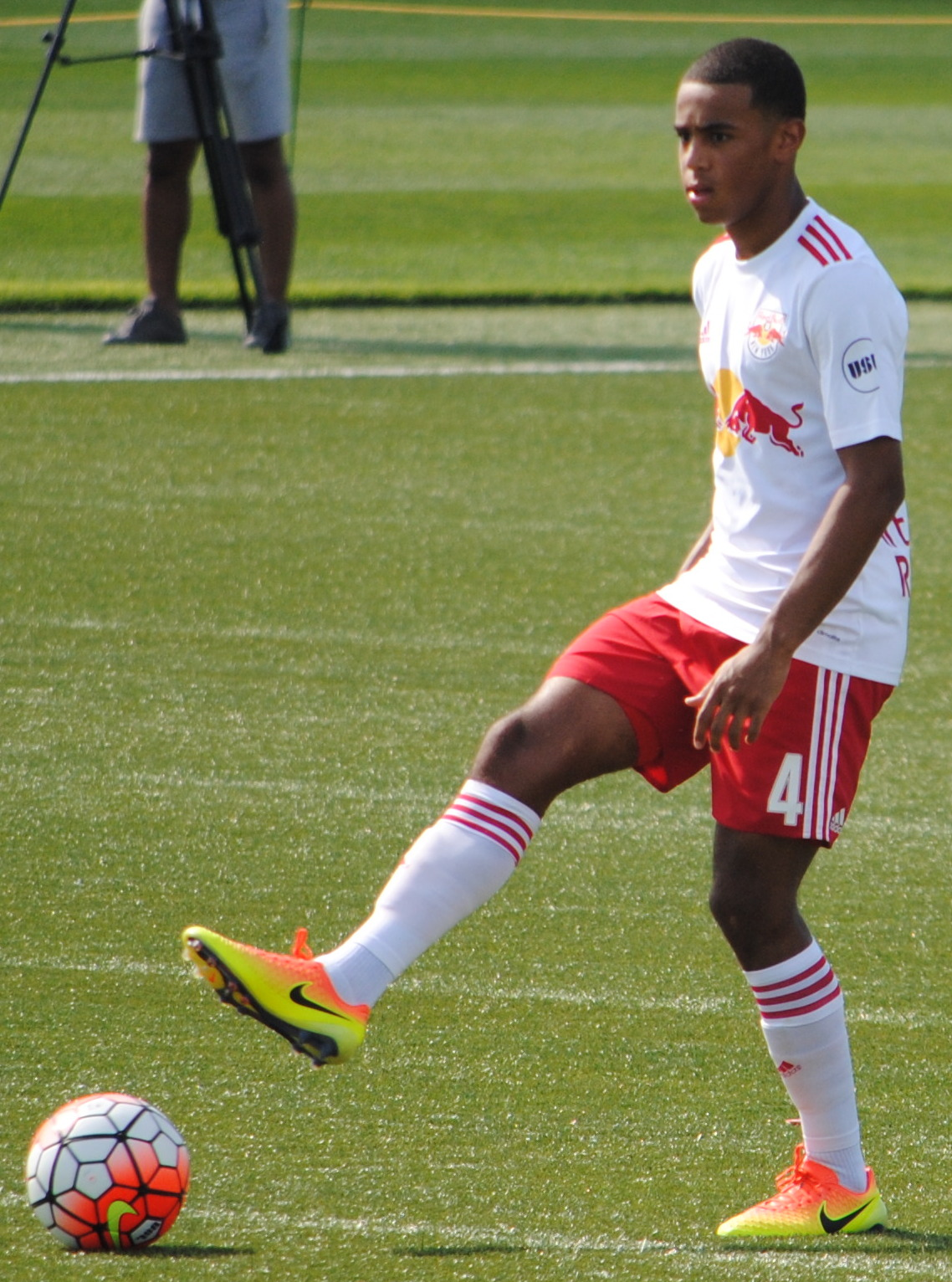
Former academy player Tyler Adams who also played with Red Bulls II from 2015 to 2016

=== New York Red Bulls II ===
New York Red Bulls II was established in 2015. It is a reserve team that competes in the USL Championship, the second tier of the American soccer pyramid. The team plays its home matches at MSU Soccer Park at Pittser Field in Montclair, New Jersey.

The fully professional team completed its inaugural USL season with a 12–10–6 record in fourth place of the Eastern Conference. The team won its first playoff game against Pittsburgh Riverhounds and advanced as far as the Eastern Conference semifinals in the 2015 USL Playoffs.

A New York Red Bulls team mostly composed of NYRB II players defeated Chelsea F.C. in a 2015 friendly.

In 2016, New York Red Bulls II defeated the Swope Park Rangers 5–1 in the 2016 United Soccer League Final winning their first United Soccer League Championship and became the first Major League Soccer-owned team to win the United Soccer League title.

The team was coached by former Red Bull and New York native John Wolyniec from its founding until the end of the 2021 season. He was replaced by former Seattle Sounders FC academy director Gary Lewis, with a plan to transition the reserve side into the newly created MLS Next Pro in 2023. Lewis failed to last half a season, with former Red Bulls player and long-time second-team assistant Ibrahim Sekagya taking over on an interim basis before being given the job permanently ahead of the 2023 season.

Sekgaya was promoted to become an assistant coach for the first team and remain head coach of the second team in 2024. However, in 2025, Sekgaya was given the assistant role with the first team full-time and replaced by ex-MetroStar and US international Michael Bradley.

=== Academy ===
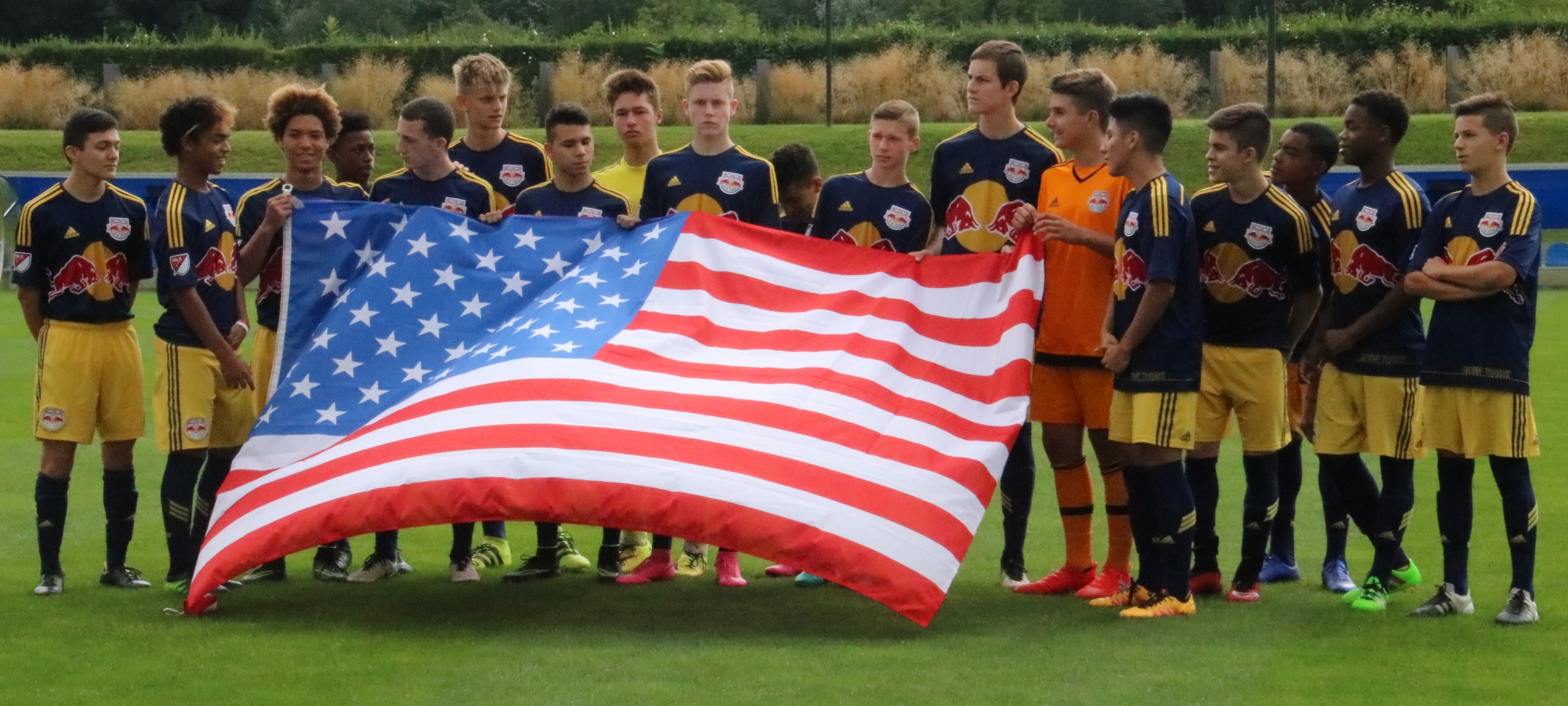
New York Red Bulls 2016 Next Generation Trophy Salzburg

The New York Red Bulls Academy is the multi-layered youth system of the New York Red Bulls. It is the first cost-free program in MLS that provides a professional soccer training environment for youth players in the New York metropolitan area. The soccer programs are operated as part of a global approach to player development. The club has produced seven players from its academy (Sean Davis, Connor Lade, Kyle Duncan, John Tolkin, Alex Muyl, Omir Fernandez and Daniel Edelman) to play at least 100 matches in all competitions for the MLS side. In 2022, Tyler Adams became the club's first academy product to represent the United States at a World Cup.

== Honors ==
Domestic
Competitions	Titles	Seasons	Runners-up
MLS Cup	0	–	2008, 2024
Supporters' Shield	3	2013, 2015, 2018	–
U.S. Open Cup	0	–	2003, 2017
Eastern Conference (Playoff)	1	2024	2000, 2014, 2015, 2018
Eastern Conference (Regular Season)	6^{s}	2000, 2010, 2013, 2015, 2016, 2018	2001
Western Conference (Playoff)	1	2008	–

Notes

- record
- ^{s} shared record

=== Awards ===
- Atlantic Cup: 2003, 2010, 2011, 2013, 2015, 2017, 2018, 2019, 2020, 2022, 2023, 2024, 2025
- Hudson River Derby: 2023
- CONCACAF Champions League Fair Play Award: 2018

== International records ==
=== Competitive record ===
- 2001 Copa Merconorte

Group stage v. (Venezuela) Deportivo Italchacao: 2–0, 1–2
Group stage v. (Colombia) Millonarios: 0–1,1–2
Group stage v. (Mexico) Guadalajara: 2–0, 2–0

- 2009–10 CONCACAF Champions League

Preliminary Round v. (Trinidad and Tobago) W Connection: 2–2, 1–2

- 2014–15 CONCACAF Champions League

Group stage v. (El Salvador) FAS: 2–0, 0–0
Group stage v. (Canada) Montreal Impact: 1–1, 0–1

- 2016–17 CONCACAF Champions League

Group stage v. (El Salvador) Alianza: 1–0, 1–1
Group stage v. (Guatemala) Antigua: 3–0, 0–0
Quarter-finals v. (Canada) Vancouver Whitecaps FC: 1–1, 0–2

- 2018 CONCACAF Champions League

Round of 16 v. (Honduras) Olimpia: 1–1, 0–2 (3–1 agg)
Quarter-finals v. (Mexico) Tijuana: 2–0, 3–1 (5–1 agg)
Semi-finals v. (Mexico) Guadalajara: 0–1, 0–0 (0–1 agg)

2018 Concacaf Champions League Fair Play Award

- 2019 CONCACAF Champions League

Round of 16 v. (Dominican Republic) Atlético Pantoja: 2–0, 3–0 (5–0 agg)
Quarterfinals v. (Mexico) Santos Laguna: 0–2, 2–4 (2–6 agg)

=== Friendly ===
- 2004 La Manga Cup

Group stage v. (Norway) Viking: 0–1
Group stage v. (Norway) Bodø/Glimt: 3–1
Semi-finals v. (Ukraine) Dynamo Kyiv: 3–2
Final v. (Norway) Viking: 1–0

- 2010 Barclays New York Challenge

Group stage v. (England) Tottenham Hotspur: 1–2
Group stage v. (England) Manchester City: 2–1

- 2011 Emirates Cup

Group stage v. (France) Paris Saint-Germain: 1–0
Group stage v. (England) Arsenal: 1–1

== Club records and statistics ==
- Most wins in a regular season: 22 (2018)
- Most points in a regular season: 71 (2018)
- Most home wins in a regular season: 14 (2018)
- Most home points in a regular season: 43 (2018)
- Scored the fastest goal in Major League Soccer history (Mike Grella, 7 seconds into the game vs Philadelphia Union on October 18, 2015, at Red Bull Arena)
- Best home record in MLS
- Most away wins in a row from the start of a season: 5 (2022)

=== Player records ===
MLS regular season only, through March 9, 2019

**Career**

- Games: 206 (United States) Luis Robles
- Minutes: 18,540 (United States) Luis Robles
- Goals: 106 (England) Bradley Wright-Phillips
- Assists: 51 (United States) Sacha Kljestan
- Shutouts: 63 (United States) Luis Robles

**Single season**

- Goals: 27 (England) Bradley Wright-Phillips, 2014
- Assists: 20 (United States) Sacha Kljestan, 2016
- Shutouts: 14 (United States) Luis Robles, 2018

==== Top career goalscorers ====
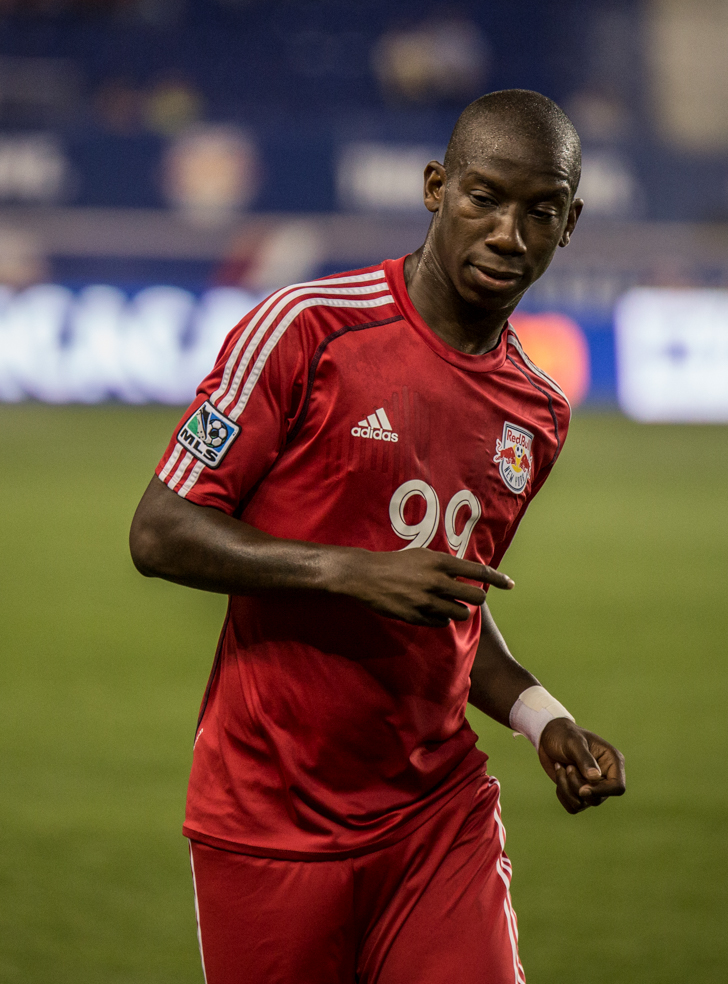
Bradley Wright-Phillips is the club's top scorer (125)

As of December 31, 2024 (all competitive matches)

No.	Player	Years	Goals
1	(England) Bradley Wright-Phillips	2013–2019	126
2	(Colombia) Juan Pablo Ángel	2007–2010	62
3	(France) Thierry Henry	2010–2014	52
4	(Austria) Daniel Royer	2016–2021	50
5	(United States) Clint Mathis	2000–2003; 2007	45
6	(Venezuela) Giovanni Savarese	1996–1998	44
7	(Honduras) Amado Guevara	2003–2006	39
8	(United States) John Wolyniec	1999; 2003–2010	36
9	(Scotland) Lewis Morgan	2022–2025	31
10	(Colombia) Adolfo Valencia	2000–2001	29

Bold signifies current Red Bulls player

==== Captains ====
Name	Years
(United States) Peter Vermes	1996
(United States) Tony Meola	1997–1998, 2006
(United States) Tab Ramos	1999–2002
(United States) Eddie Pope	2003–2004
(Honduras) Amado Guevara	2005, 2006
(France) Youri Djorkaeff	2005–2006
(United States) Claudio Reyna	2007–2008
(Colombia) Juan Pablo Ángel	2008–2010
(France) Thierry Henry	2011–2014
(United States) Dax McCarty	2015–2016
(United States) Sacha Kljestan	2017
(United States) Luis Robles	2018–2019
(United States) Sean Davis	2020–2021
(United States) Aaron Long	2022
(United States) Sean Nealis	2023
(Sweden) Emil Forsberg	2024–present

=== Key ===
Key to competitions

- Major League Soccer (MLS) – The top-flight of soccer in the United States, established in 1996.
- U.S. Open Cup (USOC) – The premier knockout cup competition in U.S. soccer, first contested in 1914.
- CONCACAF Champions League (CCL) – The premier competition in North American soccer since 1962. It went by the name of Champions' Cup until 2008.

Key to colors and symbols

1st or W	Winners
2nd or RU	Runners-up
3rd	Third place
Last	Wooden Spoon
♦	MLS Golden Boot
	Highest average attendance
Italics	Ongoing competition

Key to league record

- Season = The year and article of the season
- Div = Division/level on pyramid
- League = League name
- Pld = Games played
- W = Games won
- L = Games lost
- D = Games drawn
- GF = Goals for
- GA = Goals against
- GD = Goal difference
- Pts = Points
- PPG = Points per game
- Conf. = Conference position
- Overall = League position

Key to cup record

- DNE = Did not enter
- DNQ = Did not qualify
- NH = Competition not held or canceled
- QR = Qualifying round
- PR = Preliminary round
- GS = Group stage
- R1 = First round
- R2 = Second round
- R3 = Third round
- R4 = Fourth round
- R5 = Fifth round
- Ro16 = Round of 16
- QF = Quarterfinals
- SF = Semifinals
- F = Final
- RU = Runners-up
- W = Winners

=== Seasons ===
Season	League											Position		Playoffs	USOC	Continental / Other		Average attendance	Top goalscorer(s)	
Season	Div	League	Pld	W	L	D	GF	GA	GD	Pts	PPG	Conf.	Overall	Playoffs	USOC	Continental / Other		Average attendance	Name(s)	Goals
1996	1	MLS	32	15	17	0	45	47	−2	39	1.22	3rd	7th	QF	DNE	DNE		23,898	(Venezuela) Giovanni Savarese	14
1997	1	MLS	32	13	19	0	43	53	–10	35	1.09	5th	9th	DNQ	SF	DNQ		16,899	(Venezuela) Giovanni Savarese	14
1998	1	MLS	32	15	17	0	54	63	−9	39	1.22	3rd	6th	QF	SF	DNQ		16,519	(Venezuela) Giovanni Savarese	16
1999	1	MLS	32	7	25	0	32	64	−32	15	0.47	6th	12th	DNQ	Ro16	DNQ		14,706	(Ecuador) Eduardo Hurtado	7
2000	1	MLS	32	17	12	3	64	56	+8	54	1.69	1st	3rd	SF	SF	DNQ		17,621	(Colombia) Adolfo Valencia	21
2001	1	MLS	26	13	10	3	38	35	+3	42	1.62	2nd	6th	QF	R2	Copa Merconorte	GS	20,806	(Brazil) Rodrigo Faria	11
2002	1	MLS	28	11	15	2	41	47	−6	35	1.25	4th	9th	DNQ	QF	DNQ		18,155	(Brazil) Rodrigo Faria	14
2003	1	MLS	30	11	10	9	40	40	+0	42	1.40	3rd	5th	QF	RU	DNQ		15,822	(United States) Clint Mathis	10
2004	1	MLS	30	11	12	7	47	49	−2	40	1.33	3rd	6th	QF	Ro16	DNQ		17,195	(Honduras) Amado Guevara (United States) John Wolyniec	10♦
2005	1	MLS	32	12	9	11	53	49	+4	47	1.47	4th	6th	QF	Ro16	DNQ		15,077	(Honduras) Amado Guevara	12
2006	1	MLS	32	9	11	12	41	41	+0	39	1.22	4th	8th	QF	QF	DNQ		14,570	(Honduras) Amado Guevara	9
2007	1	MLS	30	12	11	7	47	45	+2	43	1.43	3rd	6th	QF	QR2	DNQ		16,530	(Colombia) Juan Pablo Ángel	20
2008	1	MLS	30	10	11	9	42	48	−6	39	1.30	5th	8th	RU	Ro16	DNQ		15,928	(Colombia) Juan Pablo Ángel	16
2009	1	MLS	30	5	19	6	27	47	−20	21	0.70	7th	15th	DNQ	QR2	CONCACAF Champions League	PR	12,744	(Colombia) Juan Pablo Ángel	12
2010	1	MLS	30	15	9	6	38	29	+9	51	1.70	1st	3rd	QF	Ro16	DNQ		18,441	(Colombia) Juan Pablo Ángel	14
2011	1	MLS	34	10	8	16	50	44	+6	46	1.35	5th	10th	QF	QF	DNQ		19,691	(France) Thierry Henry	15
2012	1	MLS	34	16	9	9	57	46	+11	57	1.68	3rd	4th	QF	Ro16	DNQ		18,281	(United States) Kenny Cooper	19
2013	1	MLS	34	17	9	8	58	41	+17	59	1.74	1st	1st	QF	Ro16	DNQ		19,461	(Australia) Tim Cahill	12
2014	1	MLS	34	13	10	11	55	50	+5	50	1.47	4th	8th	SF	R4	CONCACAF Champions League	GS	19,421	(England) Bradley Wright-Phillips	31♦
2015	1	MLS	34	18	10	6	62	43	+19	60	1.76	1st	1st	SF	QF	DNQ		19,657	(England) Bradley Wright-Phillips	18
2016	1	MLS	34	16	9	9	61	44	+17	57	1.68	1st	3rd	QF	R5	CONCACAF Champions League	QF	20,620	(England) Bradley Wright-Phillips	25♦
2017	1	MLS	34	14	12	8	53	47	+6	50	1.47	6th	9th	QF	RU	DNQ		21,175	(England) Bradley Wright-Phillips	24
2018	1	MLS	34	22	7	5	62	33	+29	71	2.09	1st	1st	SF	R5	CONCACAF Champions League	SF	18,644	(England) Bradley Wright-Phillips	24
2019	1	MLS	34	14	14	6	53	51	+2	48	1.41	6th	12th	R1	R4	CONCACAF Champions League	QF	17,281	(Austria) Daniel Royer	14
2020	1	MLS	23	9	9	5	29	31	−2	32	1.39	6th	13th	R1	NH	Leagues Cup MLS is Back Tournament	NH GS	15,703	(United States) Brian White	6
2021	1	MLS	34	13	12	9	39	33	+6	48	1.41	7th	14th	R1	NH	DNQ		12,558	(Poland) Patryk Klimala	8
2022	1	MLS	34	15	11	8	50	41	+9	53	1.56	4th	6th	R1	SF	DNQ		17,002	(Scotland) Lewis Morgan	17
2023	1	MLS	34	11	13	10	36	39	−3	43	1.26	9th	18th	R1	Ro16	Leagues Cup	Ro16	18,246	(United States) Omir Fernandez	8
2024	1	MLS	34	11	9	14	55	50	+5	47	1.38	7th	16th	RU	DNE	Leagues Cup	GS	19,724	(Scotland) Lewis Morgan	13
Season	League											Position		Playoffs	USOC	Continental / Other		Average attendance	Top goalscorer(s)	
Season	Div	League	Pld	W	L	D	GF	GA	GD	Pts	PPG	Conf.	Overall	Playoffs	USOC	Continental / Other		Average attendance	Name(s)	Goals

1. Avg. attendance include statistics from league matches only.
2. Top goalscorer(s) includes all goals scored in League, MLS Cup Playoffs, U.S. Open Cup, MLS is Back Tournament, CONCACAF Champions League, FIFA Club World Cup, and other competitive continental matches.

=== Average attendance ===
As of May 13, 2025

Year	Regular Season	Playoffs
1996	23,898	14,416
1997	16,899	N/A
1998	16,520	11,686
1999	14,706	N/A
2000	17,621	15,172
2001	20,806	12,817
2002	18,148	N/A
2003	15,822	10,211
2004	17,194	11,161
2005	15,077	10,003
2006	14,570	14,570
2007	16,530	14,165
2008	16,967	11,578
2009	12,229	N/A
2010	18,441	22,839
2011	19,691	22,663
2012	18,281	14,035
2013	19,460	22,264
2014	19,421	21,527
2015	19,657	25,219
2016	20,620	24,314
2017	21,175	18,107
2018	18,601	22,789
2019	17,281	N/A
2020	15,703	N/A
2021	13,161	N/A
2022	17,002	17,113
2023	18,246	16,074
2024	19,724	20,936

== Historical staff ==
=== Head coaches ===
Name	Nationality	Tenure
Eddie Firmani	Italy	January 1, 1996 – May 24, 1996
Carlos Queiroz	Portugal	May 30, 1996 – October 2, 1996
Carlos Alberto Parreira	Brazil	December 30, 1996 – December 11, 1997
Alfonso Mondelo	Spain	January 14, 1998 – September 21, 1998
Bora Milutinović	Yugoslavia	September 21, 1998 – October 29, 1999
Octavio Zambrano	Ecuador	November 29, 1999 – October 8, 2002
Bob Bradley	United States	October 21, 2002 – October 4, 2005
Mo Johnston	Scotland	October 4, 2005 – June 27, 2006
Richie Williams interim	United States	June 28, 2006 – July 18, 2006
Bruce Arena	United States	July 18, 2006 – November 5, 2007
Juan Carlos Osorio	Colombia	December 18, 2007 – August 21, 2009
Richie Williams interim	United States	August 21, 2009 – January 7, 2010
Hans Backe	Sweden	January 7, 2010 – November 9, 2012
Mike Petke	United States	January 24, 2013 – January 7, 2015
Jesse Marsch	United States	January 7, 2015 – July 6, 2018
Chris Armas	United States	July 6, 2018 – September 4, 2020
Bradley Carnell interim	South Africa	September 4, 2020 – October 6, 2020
Gerhard Struber	Austria	October 6, 2020 – May 8, 2023
Troy Lesesne	United States	May 8, 2023 – November 14, 2023
Sandro Schwarz	Germany	December 14, 2023 – October 27, 2025
Michael Bradley	United States	December 15, 2025 – present

=== General managers and sporting directors ===
Name	Nationality	Tenure
Charlie Stillitano	United States	1996–1999
Nick Sakiewicz	United States	2000–2005
Alexi Lalas	United States	2005–2006
Bruce Arena	United States	2006–2007
Jeff Agoos	United States	2008–2009
Erik Solér	Norway	2009–2012
Andy Roxburgh	Scotland	2012–2014
Ali Curtis	United States	2014–2017
Denis Hamlett	Costa Rica	2017–2020
Kevin Thelwell	England	2020–2022
Jochen Schneider	Germany	2022–2025
Julian de Guzman	Canada	2025 – present

=== Ownership ===
Name	Nationality	Tenure
John Kluge & Stuart Subotnick	United States	1995–2001
Anschutz Entertainment Group	United States	2001–2006
Red Bull GmbH	Austria	2006 – present

== See also ==
- New York Red Bulls II
- New York Red Bulls U-23
- NJ/NY Gotham FC
- RB Leipzig
- FC Red Bull Salzburg
- RB Omiya Ardija
- Red Bull Bragantino
- Red Bull Bragantino II
- Red Bull Bragantino (women)
- FC Liefering
- Red Bull Ghana
- Soccer in New York City
