= 2011 Houston Dynamo season =

Houston Dynamo
2011 season
- Owner: Philip Anschutz (AEG)
- President: Chris Canetti
- Head coach: Dominic Kinnear
- Stadium: Robertson Stadium
- Major League Soccer: Conference: 2nd Overall: 6th
- MLS Cup Playoffs: Runners-Up
- U.S. Open Cup: DNQ
- Texas Derby: Winners
- Top goalscorer: League: Bobby Boswell; Will Bruin; Geoff Cameron; Brian Ching 5 goals each All: Brian Ching 6 goals
- Highest home attendance: 30,018 v Los Angeles Galaxy (October 23, 2011)
- Lowest home attendance: 12,047 (two matches)
- Average home league attendance: 16,868
Home colors	Away colors

The 2011 Houston Dynamo season was the sixth season of the team's existence, breaking the record for the most seasons played for a Houston soccer team. The Dynamo had been tied with Houston Hurricanes, who competed in the USISL D3 Pro League from 1996 to 2000. It was the Dynamo's sixth season with head coach Dominic Kinnear and majority owner Philip Anschultz. It was Chris Canettis first season as team president, having worked as chief operating officer for the previous five.

Prior to the season, Houston was switched to MLS's Eastern Conference along with Sporting Kansas City due to expansion teams Portland Timbers and Vancouver Whitecaps FC joining the Western Conference. It was the Dynamo's final season playing at Robertson Stadium, with the new BBVA Compass Stadium set to open the following year.

After failing to qualify for the playoffs in 2010, Houston rebounded and finished 2nd in the conference. During the 2011 MLS Cup Playoffs, Houston beat the Philadelphia Union 3–1 over two legs. In the Eastern Conference Final, Houston defeated Kansas City 2–0 to reach their third ever MLS Cup, where they fell 1–0 to the Los Angeles Galaxy in the final. The Dynamo failed to qualify for the U.S. Open Cup, losing to Sporting Kansas City in the Qualification Semi-finals.

== Final roster ==
As of November 21, 2011.

Appearances and goals are totals for MLS regular season only.

No.	Name	Nationality	Position	Date of birth (Age)	Joined from	Joined in	Apps.	Goals
Goalkeepers
1	Tally Hall	(United States)	GK	May 12, 1985 (26)	Esbjerg fB	2009	39	0
24	Tyler Deric (HGP)	(United States)	GK	August 30, 1988 (23)	Houston Dynamo Academy	2009	2	0
28	Evan Newton	(United States)	GK	April 1, 1988 (23)	Old Dominion University	2011	0	0
Defenders
2	Eddie Robinson	(United States)	DF	June 19, 1978 (33)	San Jose Earthquakes	2006	96	5
4	Jermaine Taylor	(Jamaica)	DF	January 14, 1985 (26)	St. George's SC	2011	13	0
8	Kofi Sarkodie (GA)	(United States)	DF	March 22, 1991 (20)	University of Akron	2011	7	0
20	Geoff Cameron	(United States)	DF	July 11, 1985 (26)	University of Rhode Island	2008	101	11
21	Hunter Freeman	(United States)	DF	January 8, 1985 (26)	IK Start	2011	23	1
26	Corey Ashe	(United States)	DF	March 14, 1986 (25)	University of North Carolina	2007	130	1
31	André Hainault	(Canada)	DF	June 17, 1986 (25)	FK Baník Most	2009	79	4
32	Bobby Boswell	(United States)	DF	March 15, 1983 (28)	D.C. United	2008	112	7
Midfielders
5	Danny Cruz (GA)	(United States)	MF	January 3, 1990 (21)	UNLV	2009	51	4
7	Colin Clark	(United States)	MF	April 11, 1984 (27)	Colorado Rapids	2010	29	4
10	Je-Vaughn Watson	(Jamaica)	MF	October 22, 1983 (28)	Sporting Central Academy	2011	22	1
11	Brad Davis	(United States)	MF	November 8, 1981 (30)	San Jose Earthquakes	2006	159	21
13	Francisco Navas Cobo (HGP)	(United States)	MF	November 17, 1991 (20)	Houston Dynamo Academy	2010	1	0
16	Adam Moffat	(Scotland)	MF	May 15, 1986 (25)	Portland Timbers	2011	13	2
17	Luiz Camargo	(Brazil)	MF	May 4, 1987 (24)	Paraná Clube	2011	7	0
18	Josue Soto (HGP)	(United States)	MF	January 3, 1989 (22)	Houston Dynamo Academy	2011	0	0
19	Alex Dixon (HGP)	(United States)	MF	February 7, 1990 (21)	Houston Dynamo Academy	2011	7	1
Forwards
3	Calen Carr	(United States)	FW	October 4, 1982 (29)	Chicago Fire	2011	9	1
9	Jason Garey	(United States)	FW	July 19, 1984 (27)	Columbus Crew	2011	10	0
12	Will Bruin (GA)	(United States)	FW	October 24, 1989 (22)	Indiana University	2011	25	5
15	Cam Weaver	(United States)	FW	June 10, 1983 (28)	San Jose Earthquakes	2009	50	10
25	Brian Ching (C)	(United States)	FW	May 24, 1978 (32)	San Jose Earthquakes	2006	125	51
29	Carlo Costly	(Honduras)	FW	July 18, 1982 (29)	Atlas	2011	11	1

== Player movement ==
=== In ===
Per Major League Soccer and club policies terms of the deals do not get disclosed.

Date	Player	Position	Age	Previous club	Notes	Ref
December 3, 2010	(United States) Jason Garey	FW	26	(United States) Columbus Crew	Acquired in exchange for a 4th round pick in the 2015 MLS SuperDraft.	
December 13, 2010	(United States) Jordan Graye	DF	23	(United States) Portland Timbers	Acquired in exchange for a 4th round pick in the 2014 MLS SuperDraft.	
December 17, 2010	(United States) Hunter Freeman	DF	25	(Norway) IK Start	Signed on a free transfer. Houston acquired his MLS rights and a 2012 MLS SuperDraft 3rd round pick from the New York Red Bulls in exchange for allocation money.	
January 19, 2011	(United States) Alex Dixon	FW	20	(United States) Houston Dynamo Academy	Signed as a homegrown player.	
January 19, 2011	(United States) Josue Soto	MF	22	(United States) Houston Dynamo Academy	Signed as a homegrown player.	
February 16, 2011	(Jamaica) Jermaine Taylor	DF	26	(Jamaica) St. George's SC	Full transfer, fee undisclosed.	
March 23, 2011	(United States) Calen Carr	FW	28	(United States) Chicago Fire	Acquired in exchange for Dominic Oduro.	
April 15, 2011	(Jamaica) Je-Vaughn Watson	MF	27	(Jamaica) Sporting Central Academy	Full transfer, fee undisclosed.	
April 15, 2011	(Spain) Koke	FW	27	(Greece) Aris	Signed on a free transfer.	
July 21, 2011	(Scotland) Adam Moffat	MF	25	(United States) Portland Timbers	Acquired along with allocation money in exchange for Lovel Palmer, Mike Chabala, and a 2011 international roster spot	

=== Out ===
Per Major League Soccer and club policies terms of the deals do not get disclosed.

Date	Player	Position	Age	Destination Club	Notes	Ref
December 3, 2010	(Zimbabwe) Joseph Ngwenya	FW	29	(United States) D.C. United	Contract option declined, selected in the 2010 MLS Re-Entry Draft	
December 3, 2010	(United States) Ryan Cochrane	DF	27	(United States) New England Revolution	Contract option declined, selected in the 2010 MLS Re-Entry Draft	
December 3, 2010	(United States) Richard Mulrooney	MF	34	Retired	Contract option declined.	
December 3, 2010	(Canada) Pat Onstad	GK	42	(United States) D.C. United	Contract option declined, retired, and later came out of retirement.	
December 3, 2010	(Canada) Adrian Serioux	DF	31	Retired	Contract option declined.	
December 3, 2010	(Ghana) Samuel Appiah	MF	25	(United States) Pittsburgh Riverhounds	Contract option declined, free transfer.	
December 3, 2010	(Ghana) Anthony Obodai	MF	28	(Northern Cyprus) Mağusa Türk Gücü	Contract option declined, free transfer.	
March 23, 2011	(Ghana) Dominic Oduro	FW	25	(United States) Chicago Fire	Traded for Calen Carr.	
May 31, 2011	(Spain) Koke	FW	28	(Spain) Rayo Vallecano	Released, free transfer.	
June 29, 2011	(United States) Jordan Graye	DF	24	(United States) Carolina RailHawks	Released, free transfer.	
July 21, 2011	(Jamaica) Lovel Palmer	MF	26	(United States) Portland Timbers	Traded along with a 2011 international roster spot for Adam Moffat and allocation money.	
July 21, 2011	(United States) Mike Chabala	DF	27	(United States) Portland Timbers	Traded along with a 2011 international roster spot for Adam Moffat and allocation money.	

=== Loans in ===
Date	Player	Position	Age	Loaned from	Notes	Ref
August 4, 2011	(Honduras) Carlo Costly	FW	29	(Mexico) Club Atlas	Loaned for the remainder of the 2011 season.	
August 9, 2011	(Brazil) Luiz Camargo	MF	24	(Brazil) Paraná Clube	Loaned for the remainder of the 2011 season.	

=== Loans out ===
Date	Player	Position	Age	Loaned to	Notes	Ref
May 5, 2011	(United States) Evan Newton	GK	23	(United States) FC Tampa Bay	Loaned for remainder of 2011 NASL season.	

=== MLS SuperDraft ===
Round	Pick	Player	Position	Age	College	Notes	Ref
1	7	(United States) Kofi Sarkodie	DF	19	University of Akron	Signed to a Generation Adidas contract.	
1	11	(United States) Will Bruin	FW	21	Indiana University	Signed to a Generation Adidas contract.	

=== MLS Supplemental Draft ===
Round	Pick	Player	Position	Age	College	Notes	Ref
1	7	(United States) Evan Newton	GK	22	Old Dominion University	Signed with Dynamo on February 14, 2011.	
2	25	(Mexico) Sergio Castillo	MF	21	Creighton University	Did not sign with Dynamo, retired.	
3	43	Passed					

== Coaching staff ==
As of November 21, 2011.

Position	Name
Head coach	(United States) Dominic Kinnear
Assistant coach	(United States) Wade Barrett
Assistant coach	(United States) Steve Ralston
Goalkeeper coach	(United States) Tim Hanley
Head athletic trainer	(United States) Theron Enns
Assistant athletic trainer	(United States) Shane Caron
Team administrator	(United States) Nick Kowba
Equipment manager	(United States) Michael Porter

== Friendlies ==
July 20, 2011 Dynamo Charities Cup	Houston Dynamo	0–2	Bolton Wanderers	Houston, Texas
8:00 PM CDT		Report	Klasnić 32'; Wheater (yellow card) 50'; Davies 58'	Stadium: Robertson Stadium; Attendance: 11,843; Referee: Alex Prus

September 4, 2011	Houston Dynamo	3–0	Monterrey	Houston, Texas
8:00 PM CDT	Weaver 12'; Moffat (yellow card) 17' (yellow-red card) 86'; Davis 23' (pen.); Camargo (yellow card) 27'; Garey 70'; Cruz (yellow card) 89'	Report	Cardozo (yellow card) 18'; Delgado (yellow card) 26'; Pérez (red card) 29'; Suazo (red card) 44'; Orozco (yellow card) 45' de la Peña (yellow card) 64'	Stadium: Robertson Stadium; Attendance: 28,440; Referee: Jasen Anno

== Competitions ==
=== Major League Soccer ===
==== Standings ====
===== Eastern Conference =====
Pos	Team	Pld	W	L	T	GF	GA	GD	Pts	Qualification
1	Sporting Kansas City	34	13	9	12	50	40	+10	51	MLS Cup Conference Semifinals
2	Houston Dynamo	34	12	9	13	45	41	+4	49	MLS Cup Conference Semifinals
3	Philadelphia Union	34	11	8	15	44	36	+8	48	MLS Cup Conference Semifinals
4	Columbus Crew	34	13	13	8	43	44	−1	47	MLS Cup Play-In Round
5	New York Red Bulls	34	10	8	16	50	44	+6	46	MLS Cup Play-In Round
6	Chicago Fire	34	9	9	16	46	45	+1	43	
7	D.C. United	34	9	13	12	49	52	−3	39	
8	Toronto FC	34	6	13	15	36	59	−23	33	
9	New England Revolution	34	5	16	13	38	58	−20	28	

Source: MLS

===== Overall =====
Pos	Team	Pld	W	L	T	GF	GA	GD	Pts	Qualification
1	LA Galaxy (S, C)	34	19	5	10	48	28	+20	67	CONCACAF Champions League
2	Seattle Sounders FC	34	18	7	9	56	37	+19	63	CONCACAF Champions League
3	Real Salt Lake	34	15	11	8	44	36	+8	53	CONCACAF Champions League
4	FC Dallas	34	15	12	7	42	39	+3	52	
5	Sporting Kansas City	34	13	9	12	50	40	+10	51	
6	Houston Dynamo	34	12	9	13	45	41	+4	49	CONCACAF Champions League
7	Colorado Rapids	34	12	9	13	44	41	+3	49	
8	Philadelphia Union	34	11	8	15	44	36	+8	48	
9	Columbus Crew	34	13	13	8	43	44	−1	47	
10	New York Red Bulls	34	10	8	16	50	44	+6	46	
11	Chicago Fire	34	9	9	16	46	45	+1	43	
12	Portland Timbers	34	11	14	9	40	48	−8	42	
13	D.C. United	34	9	13	12	49	52	−3	39	
14	San Jose Earthquakes	34	8	12	14	40	45	−5	38	
15	Chivas USA	34	8	14	12	41	43	−2	36	
16	Toronto FC	34	6	13	15	36	59	−23	33	CONCACAF Champions League
17	New England Revolution	34	5	16	13	38	58	−20	28	
18	Vancouver Whitecaps FC	34	6	18	10	35	55	−20	28	

Source: MLS
Rules for classification: 1) points; 2) head-to-head record; 3) goal difference; 4) number of goals scored
(C) Champions; (S) Supporters' Shield

==== Results summary ====
Overall								Home						Away					
Pld	W	D	L	GF	GA	GD	Pts	W	D	L	GF	GA	GD	W	D	L	GF	GA	GD
34	12	13	9	45	41	+4	49	10	4	3	32	20	+12	2	9	6	13	21	−8

Last updated: April 15, 2021.
Source: FBref.com

==== Match results ====
March 19, 2011 1	Houston Dynamo	0–1	Philadelphia Union	Houston, Texas
7:30 PM CDT	Davis (yellow card) 22'	Report	Califf 5'; Ruiz (yellow card) 20'; Valdés (yellow card) 44'	Stadium: Robertson Stadium; Attendance: 19,385; Referee: Abbey Okulaja

March 25, 2011 2	Seattle Sounders FC	1–1	Houston Dynamo	Seattle, Washington
9:00 PM CDT	Ianni (yellow card) 43'; González (yellow card) 73'; Zakuani	Report	Freeman (yellow card) 2'; Palmer (yellow card) 30'; Cameron 42' (yellow card) 46' (goal) 80'	Stadium: Qwest Field; Attendance: 36,204; Referee: Ramon Hernandez

April 2, 2011 3	New York Red Bulls	1–1	Houston Dynamo	Harrison, New Jersey
6:30 PM CDT	Richards 47'	Report	Weaver 50' (yellow card) 73'	Stadium: Red Bull Arena; Attendance: 13,664; Referee: Ricardo Salazar

April 10, 2011 4	Houston Dynamo	3–1	Vancouver Whitecaps FC	Houston, Texas
6:00 PM CDT	Weaver 37'; Boswell 42'; Bruin 76'	Report	Leathers (yellow card) 35'; Camilo 38'; Rochat (yellow card) 55'	Stadium: Robertson Stadium; Attendance: 12,047; Referee: Jair Marrufo

April 17, 2011 5	Houston Dynamo	1–0	New England	Houston, Texas
6:00 PM CDT	Freeman 86'	Report		Stadium: Robertson Stadium; Attendance: 15,176; Referee: Alex Prus

April 23, 2011 6	Chicago Fire	1–1	Houston Dynamo	Bridgeview, Illinois
7:30 PM CDT	Oduro (yellow card) 21'; Cháves 18' (yellow card) 90+1'	Report	Boswell 83'; Palmer (yellow card) 90+5'	Stadium: Toyota Park; Attendance: 12,473; Referee: Mark Geiger

April 29, 2011 7	Houston Dynamo	4–1	D.C. United	Houston, Texas
7:30 PM CDT	Bruin 4', 41', 57'; Weaver 62'	Report	Burch 39'; Jakovic (yellow card) 66'	Stadium: Robertson Stadium; Attendance: 20,577; Referee: Jasen Anno

May 4, 2011 8	Houston Dynamo	1–2	Colorado Rapids	Houston, Texas
7:30 PM CDT	Weaver (yellow card) 34'; Davis (yellow card) 40'; Clark 71'	Report	Smith 73'; Palguta 84'	Stadium: Robertson Stadium; Attendance: 13,206; Referee: Terry Vaughn

May 7, 2011 9	Toronto FC	2–1	Houston Dynamo	Toronto, Ontario
6:00 PM CDT	Williams (yellow card) 42'; Plata 50'; Santos 81'; Eckersley (yellow card) 88'	Report	Palmer 87'	Stadium: BMO Field; Attendance: 20,259; Referee: Jorge González

May 14, 2011 10	Real Salt Lake	0–0	Houston Dynamo	Sandy, Utah
8:00 PM CDT	Russel (yellow card) 27'	Report	Bruin (yellow card) 25'	Stadium: Rio Tinto Stadium; Attendance: 16,301; Referee: Ricardo Salazar

May 21, 2011 11	Houston Dynamo	2–2	New York Red Bulls	Houston, Texas
7:30 PM CDT	Davis 12' (pen.) (yellow card) 64'; Boswell (yellow card) 49'; Koke 82'	Report	Richards 1'; Márquez (yellow card) 64'; Ballouchy 90+1'	Stadium: Robertson Stadium; Attendance: 25,314; Referee: Juan Guzman

May 25, 2011 12	Los Angeles Galaxy	1–0	Houston Dynamo	Carson, California
9:30 PM CDT	Donovan 46+' (pen.); Franklin (yellow card) 87'	Report	Watson (yellow card) 90'	Stadium: Home Depot Center; Attendance: 14,458; Referee: Chris Penso

May 28, 2011 13 Texas Derby	Houston Dynamo	2–2	FC Dallas	Houston, Texas
7:30 PM CDT	Palmer (yellow card) 30'; Weaver 42'; Sarkodie (yellow card) 56' (yellow-red card) 72'; Clark 87'	Report	Jacobson 27'; Loyd (yellow card) 45+1'; Ihemulu 70'; Shea (yellow card) 90+1'	Stadium: Robertson Stadium; Attendance: 16,709; Referee: Terry Vaughn

June 4, 2011 14	San Jose Earthquakes	2–0	Houston Dynamo	Santa Clara, California
9:30 PM CDT	Lenhart 69'; Lenhart 90+1'	Report	Chabala (yellow card) 59'; Ashe (yellow card) 80'	Stadium: Buck Shaw Stadium; Attendance: 9,270; Referee: Alex Prus

June 11, 2011 15	Houston Dynamo	2–1	Chivas USA	Houston, Texas
7:30 PM CDT	Cameron 29'; Pearce 56' (o.g.)	Report	Mondaini 7'; Umaña (yellow card) 48'; Pearce (yellow card) 59'	Stadium: Robertson Stadium; Attendance: 19,333; Referee: Geoff Gamble

June 18, 2011 16	Houston Dynamo	0–2	Columbus Crew	Houston, Texas
7:30 PM CDT	Freeman (yellow card) 43'; Palmer (yellow card) 45+1' (yellow-red card) 52'	Report	Mendoza 41'; Anor (yellow card) 49' (goal) 77'; Heinemann (yellow card) 83'	Stadium: Robertson Stadium; Attendance: 13,039; Referee: Jasen Anno

June 25, 2011 17	D.C. United	2–2	Houston Dynamo	Washington, D.C.
5:00 PM CDT	Pontius 31' (yellow card) 90+6'; Davies 73'	Report	Davis 41' (pen.); Sarkodie (yellow card) 74'; Ching 89'; Cruz (yellow card) 90+6'	Stadium: RFK Stadium; Attendance: 15,734; Referee: Mark Kadlecik

July 3, 2011 18	Colorado Rapids	0–0	Houston Dynamo	Commerce City, Colorado
8:00 PM CDT	Amarikwa (yellow card) 90+2' (yellow-red card) 90+3'	Report	Clark (yellow card) 75'; Hall (yellow card) 90+1'	Stadium: Dick's Sporting Goods Park; Attendance: 18,203; Referee: Baldomero Toledo

July 9, 2011 19	Houston Dynamo	2–0	Toronto FC	Houston, Texas
7:30 PM CDT	Cruz 50' (yellow card) 85'; Cameron 81'	Report	Eckersley (yellow card) 32'; Gordon (yellow card) 64'; Yourassowsky (yellow card) 68'	Stadium: Robertson Stadium; Attendance: 19,085; Referee: Hilario Grajeda

July 16, 2011 20	Houston Dynamo	1–1	Sporting Kansas City	Houston, Texas
7:30 PM CDT	Davis 8'; Cruz (yellow card) 21'; Clark (red card) 51'; Ching (red card) 70'	Report	Collin 90' (yellow card) 90'	Stadium: Robertson Stadium; Attendance: 12,047; Referee: Kevin Stott

July 23, 2011 21	Chivas USA	3–0	Houston Dynamo	Carson, California
9:30 PM CDT	Braun 31', 40', 86' (yellow card) 81'	Report	Watson (yellow card) 43' (yellow-red card) 70'	Stadium: Home Depot Center; Attendance: 11,013; Referee: Abiodun Okulaja

July 30, 2011 22	Houston Dynamo	3–1	Seattle Sounders FC	Houston, Texas
7:30 PM CDT	Clark 7'; Ching 23', 71'; Weaver (yellow card) 34'; Davis (yellow card) 76'	Report	Fernández 36' (pen.) (yellow card) 38'; Fucito (yellow card) 87'	Stadium: Robertson Stadium; Attendance: 18,465; Referee: Niko Bratsis

August 6, 2011 23	Philadelphia Union	1–1	Houston Dynamo	Chester, Pennsylvania
7:00 PM CDT	McInerney 15'; Valdés (yellow card) 83'	Report	Boswell (yellow card) 78'; Cameron 84'	Stadium: PPL Park; Attendance: 18,524; Referee: Terry Vaughn

August 14, 2011 24	Houston Dynamo	2–1	Portland Timbers	Houston, Texas
8:00 PM CDT	Moffat (yellow card) 9' (goal) 17'; Ching 27'	Report	Palmer (yellow card) 54'; Jewsbury 56'	Stadium: Robertson Stadium; Attendance: 14,475; Referee: Baldomero Toledo

August 17, 2011 25	New England Revolution	1–1	Houston Dynamo	Foxborough, Massachusetts
7:00 PM CDT	Cochrane 4'; Caraglio (yellow card) 64'; Reis (red card) 90+4'	Report	Freeman (yellow card) 67'; Moffat (yellow card) 79' (yellow-red card) 90+4'; Boswell (yellow card) 83' (goal) 90'; Taylor (yellow card) 90+2'	Stadium: Gillette Stadium; Attendance: 10,963; Referee: Michael Kennedy (referee)

August 20, 2011 26	Houston Dynamo	3–2	Real Salt Lake	Houston, Texas
7:30 PM CDT	Boswell (yellow card) 33' (goal) 69'; Ching 47'; Ashe (yellow card) 58'; Watson (yellow card) 60'; Dixon 90+3'	Report	Espíndola 28'; Gil 60'; Saborío (yellow card) 67'	Stadium: Robertson Stadium; Attendance: 16,247; Referee: Abiodun Okulaja

August 27, 2011 27	Vancouver Whitecaps FC	1–0	Houston Dynamo	Vancouver, British Columbia
: PM CDT	Chiumiento (yellow card) 57'; Salinas 86'	Report	Boswell (yellow card) 89'	Stadium: Empire Field; Attendance: 20,226; Referee: Niko Bratsis

September 10, 2011 28	Sporting Kansas City	3–0	Houston Dynamo	Kansas City, Kansas
3:00 PM CDT	Bunbury 9', 73'; Jéferson (yellow card) 36'; Sapong 79'	Report	Cameron (yellow card) 61'; Costly (red card) 64'	Stadium: Livestrong Sporting Park; Attendance: 14,791; Referee: Mark Geiger

September 14, 2011 29	Columbus Crew	2–2	Houston Dynamo	Columbus, Ohio
6:30 PM CDT	Ekpo (red card) 11'; Mendoza 64' (pen.), 75' (pen.); Rogers (yellow card) 67'	Report	Watson 34'; Taylor (yellow card) 55'; Carr 86'	Stadium: Crew Stadium; Attendance: 10,709; Referee: Chris Penso

September 17, 2011 30	Houston Dynamo	2–1	San Jose Earthquakes	Houston, Texas
7:30 PM CDT	Davis (yellow card) 18' (goal) 47' (pen.); Moffat (yellow card) 61'; Bruin 79'	Report	Stephenson 40'; Attakora (yellow card) 64'	Stadium: Robertson Stadium; Attendance: 18,129; Referee: Silviu Petrescu

September 24, 2011 31 Texas Derby	FC Dallas	0–1	Houston Dynamo	Frisco, Texas
3:00 PM CDT	Ihemelu (yellow card) 33'	Report	Boswell (yellow card) 26'; Cameron 87'	Stadium: Pizza Hut Park; Attendance: 10,849; Referee: Ricardo Salazar

October 1, 2011 32	Houston Dynamo	1–1	Chicago Fire	Houston, Texas
3:00 PM CDT	Clark 33'	Report	Oduro 43'; Segares (yellow card) 68'	Stadium: Robertson Stadium; Attendance: 17,544; Referee: Edvin Jurisevic

October 14, 2011 33	Portland Timbers	0–2	Houston Dynamo	Portland, Oregon
9:30 PM CDT		Report	Hainault 36'; Cruz (yellow card) 51' (goal) 59'; Watson (yellow card) 87'	Stadium: Jeld-Wen Field; Attendance: 20,323; Referee: Baldomero Toledo

October 23, 2011 34	Houston Dynamo	3–1	Los Angeles Galaxy	Houston, Texas
6:00 PM CDT	Moffat 27'; Hainault (yellow card) 43'; Cruz (yellow card) 44'; Boswell 48'; Costly 74' (yellow card) 75'	Report	Kirovski (yellow card) 49'; McBean 88'	Stadium: Robertson Stadium; Attendance: 30,018; Referee: Jorge Gonzalez

=== MLS Cup Playoffs ===
October 29, 2011 Conf. SF	Philadelphia Union	1–2	Houston Dynamo	Chester, Pennsylvania
4:00 PM CDT	Farfán (yellow card) 4'; Le Toux 7'; Miglioranzi (yellow card) 17'; Williams (yellow card) 39'; Carroll (yellow card) 65'	Report	Hainault 5'; Cruz (yellow card) 27'; Carr 30'; Moffat (yellow card) 40'	Stadium: PPL Park; Attendance: 18,539; Referee: Jair Marrufo

November 3, 2011 Conf. SF	Houston Dynamo	1–0	Philadelphia Union	Houston, Texas
7:30 PM CDT	Ching 45+3'; Carr (yellow card) 67'	Report	Valdés (yellow card) 30'; Farfán (yellow card) 51'	Stadium: Robertson Stadium; Attendance: 24,749; Referee: Ricardo Salazar

November 6, 2011 Conf. Final	Sporting Kansas City	0–2	Houston Dynamo	Kansas City, Kansas
4:30 PM CST	Júlio César (yellow card) 30'; Espinoza (yellow card) 74'	Report	Carr (yellow card) 17'; Hainault 53'; Camargo (yellow card) 55'; Costly 87' (yellow card) 87'	Stadium: Livestrong Sporting Park; Attendance: 20,839; Referee: Mark Geiger

November 20, 2011 MLS Cup	Los Angeles Galaxy	1–0	Houston Dynamo	Carson, California
8:00 PM CST	Cristman (yellow card) 40'; Donovan 72' (yellow card) 90+4'; Beckham (yellow card) 82'	Report	Boswell (yellow card) 13'; Hainault (yellow card) 74'	Stadium: Home Depot Center; Attendance: 30,281; Referee: Ricardo Salazar

=== U.S. Open Cup ===
April 6, 2011 Qualifying; Semifinal	Houston Dynamo (Texas)	0–1 (a.e.t.)	Sporting Kansas City	Aggie Soccer Stadium (Texas A&M), College Station
7:00 PM CDT	Sarkodie (yellow card) 5'; Palmer (yellow card) 43'; Chabala (yellow card) 65'; Boswell (yellow card) 73'	Report	Bravo (yellow card) 45+1'; Sapong 92'	Attendance: 2,383; Referee: Ismail Elfath

== Player statistics ==
=== Appearances, goals, and assists ===
No.	Pos.	Nat.	Player	Total			MLS			Playoffs			U.S. Open Cup		
No.	Pos.	Nat.	Player	Apps	G	A	Apps	G	A	Apps	G	A	Apps	G	A
1	GK	(United States)	Tally Hall	38	0	0	34	0	0	4	0	0	0	0	0
2	DF	(United States)	Eddie Robinson	3	0	0	2	0	0	0	0	0	1	0	0
3	FW	(United States)	Calen Carr	13	2	0	9	1	0	4	1	0	0	0	0
4	DF	(Jamaica)	Jermaine Taylor	15	0	1	13	0	1	2	0	0	0	0	0
5	MF	(United States)	Danny Cruz	25	2	3	20	2	3	4	0	0	1	0	0
7	FW	(United States)	Colin Clark	31	4	3	29	4	3	1	0	0	0	0	0
8	DF	(United States)	Kofi Sarkodie	8	0	0	7	0	0	0	0	0	1	0	0
9	FW	(United States)	Jason Garey	11	0	0	10	0	0	0	0	0	1	0	0
10	MF	(Jamaica)	Je-Vaughn Watson	25	1	2	22	1	2	3	0	0	0	0	0
11	MF	(United States)	Brad Davis	37	4	18	34	4	16	3	0	2	0	0	0
12	FW	(United States)	Will Bruin	29	5	1	25	5	1	3	0	0	1	0	0
13	MF	(United States)	Francisco Navas Cobo	0	0	0	0	0	0	0	0	0	0	0	0
14	DF	(United States)	Jordan Graye (Note: Left during the season)	1	0	0	0	0	0	0	0	0	1	0	0
15	FW	(United States)	Cam Weaver	29	4	1	28	4	1	0	0	0	1	0	0
16	MF	(Scotland)	Adam Moffat	17	2	1	13	2	1	4	0	0	0	0	0
17	MF	(Brazil)	Luiz Camargo	11	0	3	7	0	2	4	0	1	0	0	0
17	DF	(United States)	Mike Chabala	8	0	0	7	0	0	0	0	0	1	0	0
18	MF	(United States)	Josue Soto	0	0	0	0	0	0	0	0	0	0	0	0
19	MF	(United States)	Alex Dixon	8	1	0	7	1	0	0	0	0	1	0	0
20	DF	(United States)	Geoff Cameron	37	5	5	33	5	5	4	0	0	0	0	0
21	DF	(United States)	Hunter Freeman	23	1	2	23	1	2	0	0	0	0	0	0
22	MF	(Jamaica)	Lovel Palmer	20	1	0	19	1	0	0	0	0	1	0	0
23	FW	(Ghana)	Dominic Oduro	1	0	0	1	0	0	0	0	0	0	0	0
24	GK	(United States)	Tyler Deric	1	0	0	0	0	0	0	0	0	1	0	0
25	FW	(United States)	Brian Ching	24	6	2	20	5	1	4	1	1	0	0	0
26	DF	(United States)	Corey Ashe	37	0	0	32	0	0	4	0	0	1	0	0
27	FW	(Honduras)	Carlo Costly	15	2	1	11	1	1	4	1	0	0	0	0
27	FW	(Spain)	Koke	7	1	0	7	1	0	0	0	0	0	0	0
28	GK	(United States)	Evan Newton	0	0	0	0	0	0	0	0	0	0	0	0
31	DF	(Canada)	André Hainault	35	2	1	31	0	1	4	2	0	0	0	0
32	DF	(United States)	Bobby Boswell	33	5	1	28	5	1	4	0	0	1	0	0

Source: Season statistics and match reports in Competitions

=== Disciplinary record ===
No.	Pos.	Nat.	Player	Total		MLS		Playoffs		U.S. Open Cup	
No.	Pos.	Nat.	Player	Booked	Sent off (straight red)	Booked	Sent off (straight red)	Booked	Sent off (straight red)	Booked	Sent off (straight red)
1	GK	(United States)	Tally Hall	1	0	1	0	0	0	0	0
3	FW	(United States)	Calen Carr	1	0	0	0	1	0	0	0
4	DF	(Jamaica)	Jermaine Taylor	2	0	2	0	0	0	0	0
5	MF	(United States)	Danny Cruz	6	0	5	0	1	0	0	0
7	FW	(United States)	Colin Clark	1	1	1	1	0	0	0	0
8	DF	(United States)	Kofi Sarkodie	3	1	2	1	0	0	1	0
10	MF	(Jamaica)	Je-Vaughn Watson	4	1	4	1	0	0	0	0
11	MF	(United States)	Brad Davis	5	0	5	0	0	0	0	0
12	WF	(United States)	Will Bruin	1	0	1	0	0	0	0	0
15	FW	(United States)	Cam Weaver	3	0	3	0	0	0	0	0
16	MF	(Scotland)	Adam Moffat	4	1	3	1	1	0	0	0
17	MF	(Brazil)	Luiz Camargo	2	0	0	0	2	0	0	0
17	DF	(United States)	Mike Chabala (Note: Left during the season)	2	0	1	0	0	0	1	0
20	DF	(United States)	Geoff Cameron	2	0	2	0	0	0	0	0
21	DF	(United States)	Hunter Freeman	3	0	3	0	0	0	0	0
22	MF	(Jamaica)	Lovel Palmer	5	1	4	1	0	0	1	0
25	FW	(United States)	Brian Ching	0	1	0	1	0	0	0	0
26	DF	(United States)	Corey Ashe	2	0	2	0	0	0	0	0
27	FW	(Honduras)	Carlo Costly	2	1	1	1	1	0	0	0
31	DF	(Canada)	André Hainault	2	0	1	0	1	0	0	0
32	DF	(United States)	Bobby Boswell	8	0	6	0	1	0	1	0

Source: Season statistics and match reports in Competitions

== Honors and awards ==
=== MLS Player of the Month ===
Month	Player	Ref.
April	(United States) Brad Davis	

=== MLS Player of the Week ===
Week	Player	Ref.
7	(United States) Will Bruin	

=== MLS Goal of the Week ===
Week	Player	Opponent	Date	Ref.
22	(Scotland) Adam Moffat	Portland Timbers	August 14	
31	(United States) Danny Cruz	Portland Timbers	October 14	
32	(Scotland) Adam Moffat	LA Galaxy	October 23	

=== Annual ===
Honor	Player	Ref.
MLS All-Star	(United States) Brad Davis (United States) Corey Ashe (United States) Geoff Cameron (United States) Tally Hall	
MLS Best XI	(United States) Brad Davis	

=== Dynamo team awards ===
MVP	Defensive Player of the Year	Humanitarian of the Year	Young Player of the Year	Newcomer of the Year	Ref.
(United States) Brad Davis	(Canada) André Hainault	(United States) Brad Davis	(United States) Will Bruin	(Scotland) Adam Moffat	

== Kits ==
Supplier: Adidas / Sponsor: Greenstar

Home	Away
