= MLS Cup 2012 =

2012 edition of the MLS Cup

- Event: MLS Cup
LA Galaxy	Houston Dynamo
3	1
- Date: December 1, 2012
- Venue: The Home Depot Center, Carson, California, US
- MLS Cup MVP: Omar Gonzalez (LA Galaxy)
- Referee: Silviu Petrescu
- Attendance: 30,510
- Weather: Rain, 66 °F (19 °C)

MLS Cup 2012, the 17th edition of Major League Soccer's championship match, was a rematch between the Houston Dynamo and the Los Angeles Galaxy to decide the champion of the 2012 season. The soccer match was played at the Home Depot Center in Carson, California on December 1, 2012. Los Angeles defeated Houston 3–1 giving the Galaxy their second-straight league title and their record-tying fourth overall.

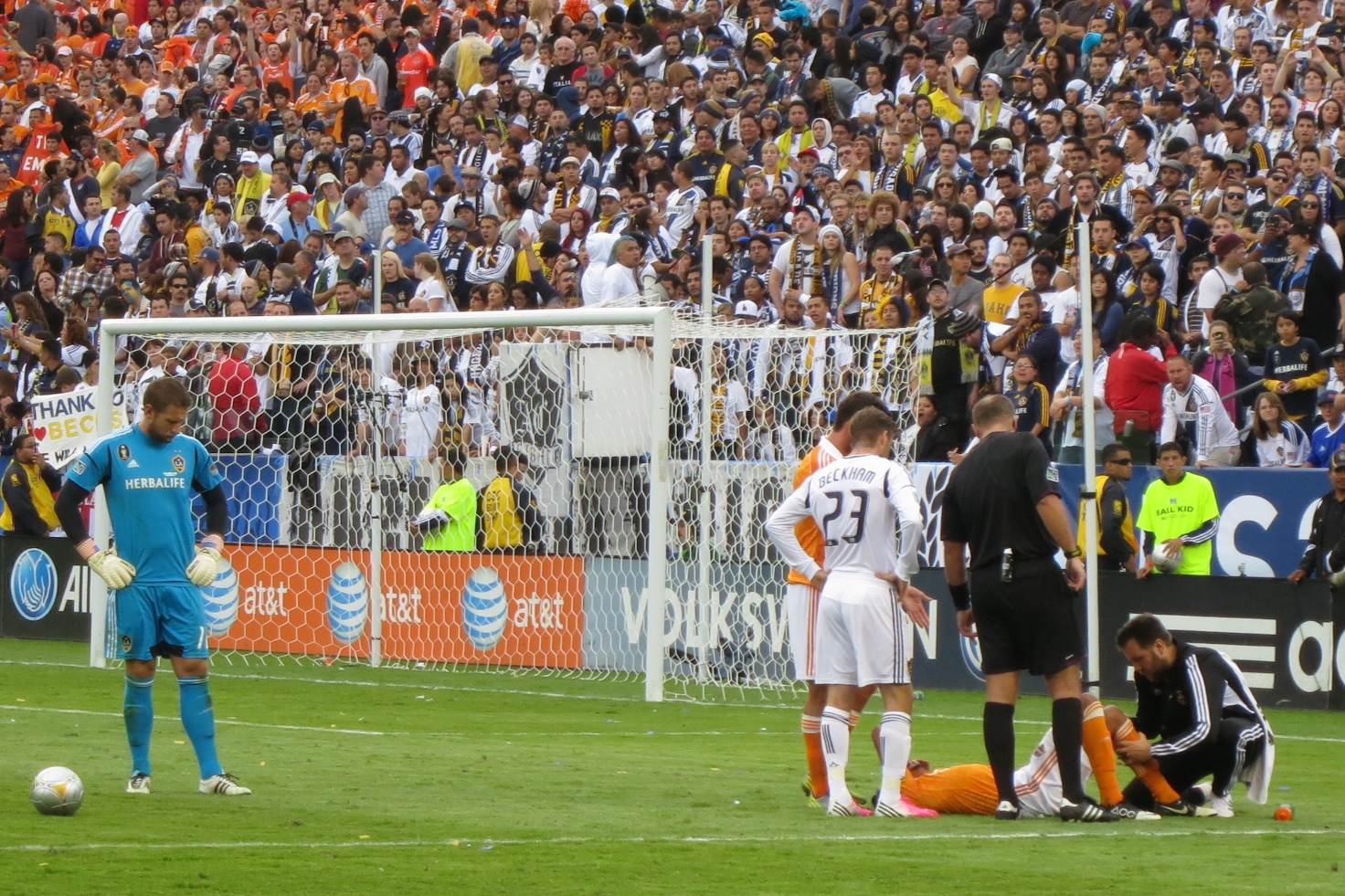
Calen Carr lies injured as David Beckham look on during the 2012 MLS Cup.

For the first time in MLS Cup history, the championship was not held at a predetermined neutral site. Instead, the match venue was held in the home stadium of the finalist with the best regular season record, in this case The Home Depot Center (Los Angeles), which broke the MLS record for hosting the most MLS Cup matches (5). The game was a rematch of the 2011 MLS Cup, won 1–0 by the Galaxy.

As MLS Cup finalists, both Houston and Los Angeles qualified for the 2013–14 CONCACAF Champions League (champion in Pot A, runner-up in Pot B).

== Road to the final ==
Los Angeles Galaxy
Round
Houston Dynamo

Western Conference
Team	GP	W	L	T	GF	GA	GD	Pts
San Jose Earthquakes	34	19	6	9	72	43	+29	66
Real Salt Lake	34	17	11	6	46	35	+11	57
Seattle Sounders FC	34	15	8	11	51	33	+18	56
Los Angeles Galaxy	34	16	12	6	59	47	+12	54
Vancouver Whitecaps FC	34	11	13	10	35	41	−6	43

Regular season

Eastern Conference
Team	GP	W	L	T	GF	GA	GD	Pts.
Sporting Kansas City	34	18	7	9	42	27	+15	63
D.C. United	34	17	10	7	53	43	+10	58
New York Red Bulls	34	16	9	9	57	46	+11	57
Chicago Fire	34	17	11	6	46	41	+5	57
Houston Dynamo	34	14	9	11	48	41	+7	53

Opponent
Result
Legs
Playoffs
Opponent
Result
Legs
Vancouver Whitecaps FC
2–1
2–1 home
Knockout Round
Chicago Fire
2–1
2–1 away
San Jose Earthquakes
3–2
0–1 home; 3–1 away
Conf. Semifinals
Sporting Kansas City
2–1
2–0 home; 0–1 away
Seattle Sounders FC
4–2
3–0 home; 1–2 away
Conference Finals
D.C. United
4–2
3–1 home; 1–1 away

=== Los Angeles Galaxy ===
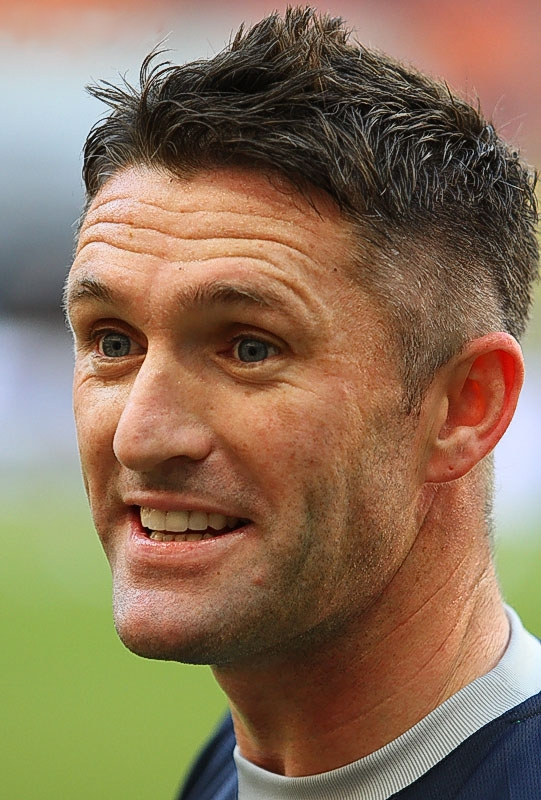
Galaxy striker, Robbie Keane, lead the team in scoring during the 2012 MLS Cup Playoffs.

Los Angeles Galaxy entered the 2012 season as the defending MLS Cup champions, as well as the Supporters Shield titleholders, becoming the first team since 2008 to achieve a "league double" (having the best regular season record, and winning the championship). Due to preseason injuries, the Galaxy started their 2012 campaign off on a rough note, at point being at the bottom of the Western Conference table. Their 3–8–2 record to begin the season caused many critics to wonder if the club was even capable of qualifying for the 2012 MLS Cup Playoffs.

Midway through the regular season however, Los Angeles went on a resurgence, that saw the club climb as high as third place in the Western Conference. Many point to the return of center-back Omar Gonzalez as a source for the team's renowned success, as well as the Josh Saunders returning from injury. Due to their early season underachievement, the club was unable to ever seriously be in the talks of the Supporters Shield race. Their revitalization in the regular season got them within a dozen points of eventual premiers, and their upstate rivals, San Jose Earthquakes, but in early October Los Angeles was mathematically unable to defend the Shield for what would have been a record third-consecutive year.

The regular season ended with the Galaxy finishing fourth place in the West, and eighth place overall, their poorest regular season performance since 2008. Despite this, the club embarked on a remarkable run in the MLS Cup Playoffs, having to play a record five matches before reaching the MLS Cup final. Despite this, the club lost two matches during the run, one being at home. The Galaxy's playoff campaign began a month before MLS Cup, on November 1, hosting the fifth-placed Vancouver Whitecaps FC at the Home Depot Center, in the wildcard round. Many pundits and media outlets expected Los Angeles to be heavy favorites in this round, mostly due to Los Angeles' strong form, in stark contrast to Vancouver's weak form (the Whitecaps had only won a single match in their last 11).

Despite the predictions, Los Angeles fell behind Vancouver very early on, due to a third-minute goal from the Whitecaps' Darren Mattocks. Despite the advantage for Vancouver, Los Angeles dominated possession throughout the first half. The Galaxy's effort paid off thanks to an eight-yard volley from Mike Magee off a cross from Juninho in the 69th minute of play, tying the match at 1–1. With a minute, the Galaxy penetrated the Whitecaps' back line, as Juninho slid a pass into the penalty box to Landon Donovan. Donovan was immediately brought down by Vancouver's Martin Bonjour who had just entered the match. Center official, Silviu Petrescu gave a yellow card to Bonjour, in what some believed should have been a red card, for denial of a goal-scoring opportunity. Donovan scored on the penalty kick, and gave the Galaxy the 2–1 lead, which would eventually end up being the scoreline to the match.

"I feel like you’re assuming [Gonzalez] is really dominant. I feel like you’re wanting me to assume these things or something. I’m not comfortable assuming these things."

— San Jose striker Steven Lenhart speaking about Omar Gonzalez, November 3, 2012

As winners of the wildcard round, the Galaxy played their California Clasico rivals, San Jose Earthquakes, in the conference semifinals. San Jose, coming off a remarkable turnaround season, earned the Supporters Shield and amassed 68 points during the regular season. Some drama between the two sides sparked throughout the American soccer niche, when Galaxy defender Gonzalez described the Earthquakes' style as "embarrassing", while San Jose's Steven Lenhart, who had been creating a cult-following in the league, described being "unintimidated" by Gonzalez. The two-leg, aggregate series began on November 4, with Los Angeles hosting San Jose. The closely knitted affair looked likely to head into a draw, until a free kick was awarded to San Jose in the third minute of second half stoppage time. San Jose, known throughout the season for their late-match heroics, notched a bizarre free kick thanks to Víctor Bernárdez. The ball seeped through the wall that Los Angeles had assembled and awkwardly caught Saunders off guard, who failed to stop the shot from going in the goal. The result gave San Jose a 1–0 aggregate lead headed into the second leg.

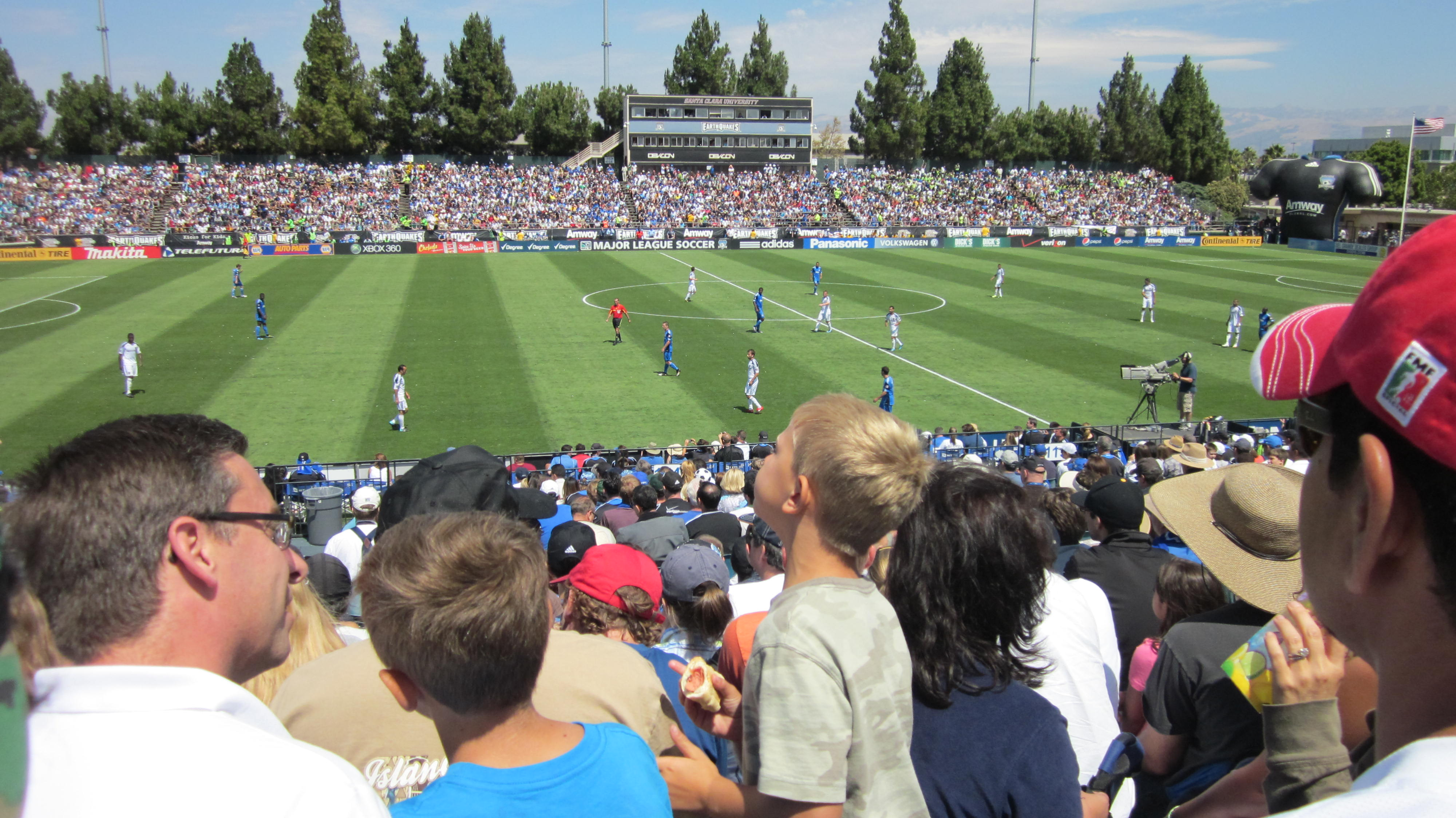
Los Angeles Galaxy became the first team to defeat San Jose at Buck Shaw Stadium since August 2011.

On November 7, Los Angeles and San Jose dueled in the second round of the conference semifinals, where Galaxy striker, Robbie Keane quickly gave the Galaxy the upper hand in the series, notching two goals in the 21st and 34th minutes of play. Los Angeles' Magee added an insurance goal that would eventually be the series winner in the 39th minute. For the remainder of the first half and a majority of the second half, Los Angeles comfortably held off San Jose, until the 'Quakes earned a free kick in the 81st minute. There, a chip from Alan Gordon gave the Quakes a late goal, resulting in Los Angeles' series lead being trimmed to a goal. For the final 10 minutes, plus added time, San Jose dominated possession but failed to find an equalizer, giving the Galaxy a fourth-straight berth into the Western Conference championship.

With the final leg being played at San Jose's Buck Shaw Stadium, where the Earthquakes went undefeated during the regular season, it looked likely for Los Angeles' postseason to end in the conference semifinals. Although there was an advantage for San Jose, the Galaxy expressed confidence heading into the second leg that they felt that the club could repeat as MLS Champs.

=== Houston Dynamo ===
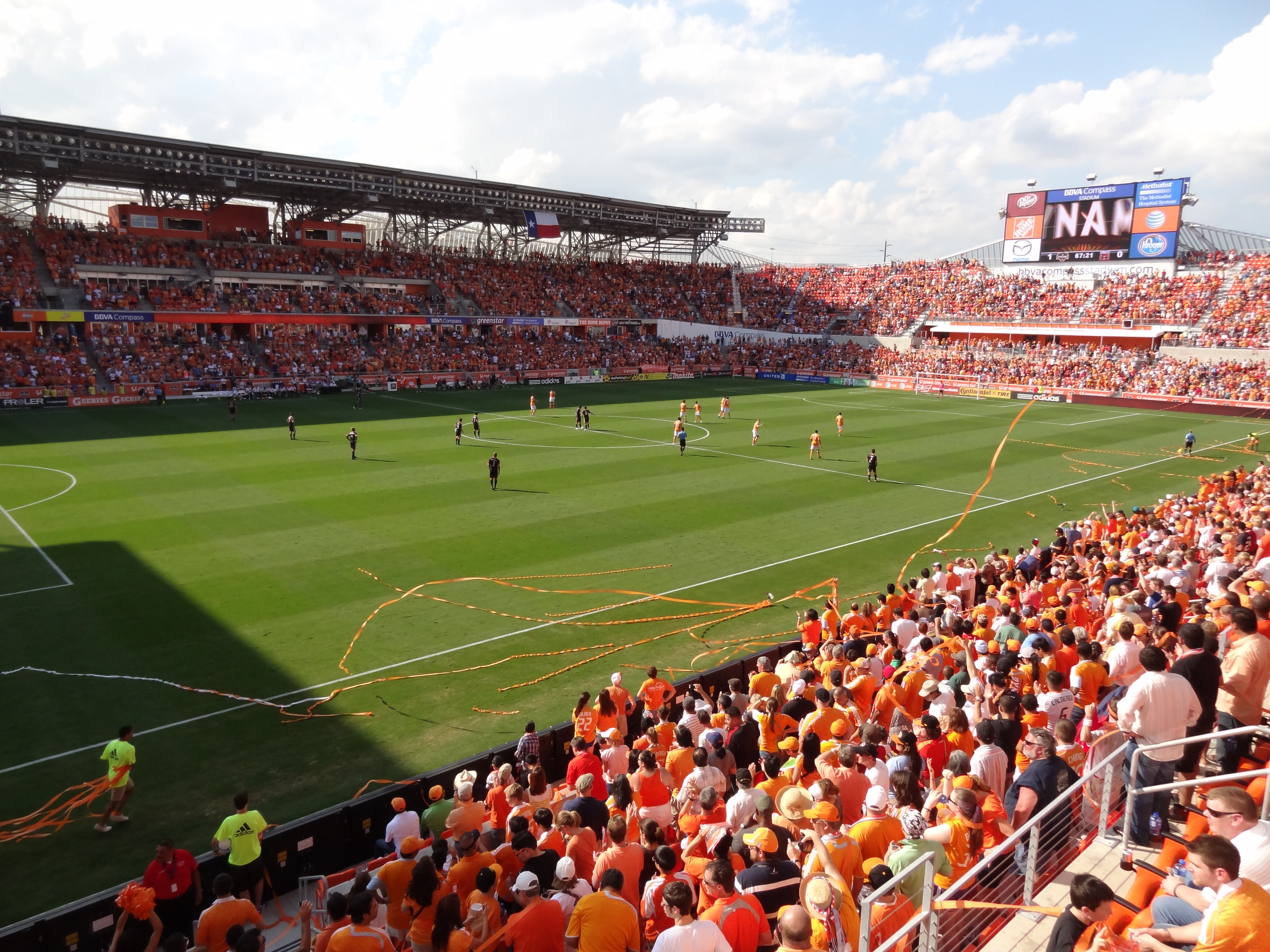
Houston's home stadium, BBVA Compass Stadium. During the playoffs, Houston went undefeated here and only conceded one goal.

Houston entered the 2012 as the finalists for MLS Cup 2011, but failed to perform as well during the regular season in 2012 as they did the previous year. Barely qualifying for the playoffs, Houston finished one point ahead of Columbus Crew for the fifth and final playoff berth, although their spot in the playoffs was claimed with a week left in the regular season.

On October 31, Houston Dynamo played the Chicago Fire in the opening round of the playoffs (known as the Knockout round). Played in Chicago's suburb of Bridgeview, the Dynamo took a 1–0 lead over the Fire off a 12th-minute strike from Will Bruin. Bruin would double Houston's lead a minute into the second half, before Chicago's Alex slashed the lead in half in the 88th minute. The late surge by Chicago proved to be too little too late, as Houston advanced past Chicago and into the Conference playoff semifinals, where they took on Eastern Conference regular season, and 2012 U.S. Open Cup champions, Sporting Kansas City.

Five days after the knockout round match against Chicago, Houston's newly opened BBVA Compass Stadium hosted its first ever MLS Cup Playoffs match, for the first leg of the Conference semifinals. Taking on Sporting Kansas City, the Houston Dynamo jumped–once again–to an early lead off of an Adam Moffat goal in the 18th minute of play. Though it would end up being the leg-winning goal, Houston's Bruin score the insurance goal in the 27th minute, which would prove to eventually be the series winner. The match itself ended in a 2–0 advantage for Houston, being up two goals in the second leg.

The second leg of the Conference semifinals proved to be a hostile environment for Houston, as Kansas City dominated much of the ball possession, but failed to tally a goal in the first half of play. Kansas City would eventually score, and slash the series lead in half with a diving header from Seth Sinovic in the 64th minute. From there, it looked likely that Kansas City would eventually find the series-tying goal. Despite that onslaught of pressure from Kansas City, the Dynamo were able to hold off wave, upon wave, of attack, and even managed to create some counterattacking moments, although they were unsuccessful in doing so. Nevertheless, the match ended in a 1–0 loss to Houston, but with Houston winning the series, upsetting Kansas City 2–1 on aggregate.

In the Conference Finals, Houston Dynamo took on D.C. United, who had been returning to the playoffs for the first time in five years. The first leg of the series proved to be extremely controversial, with some saying that a decision by referee Ricardo Salazar decided the whole series. Played on November 11, United went up early off of a through ball from United's Marcelo Saragosa to rookie midfielder, Nick DeLeon who slotted a shot underneath Houston's Tally Hall to give United the 1–0 lead in the 27th minute. United maintained the 1–0 lead through the remainder of the first half. In the second half, United's Saragosa had a breakaway shot on goal, but was taken down by Houston's André Hainault. Protesting for a red card, due to a take down and denying a goal-scoring opportunity, center official Salazar did not card Hainault, nor call a foul. Subsequently, the Professional Referee's Association made a press release saying that it should have been an ejection. However, Houston eventually went on to score three unanswered goals, including one by Hainault. The decision was heavily criticized, though United's Ben Olsen said his club should have done a better job closing out the match regardless.

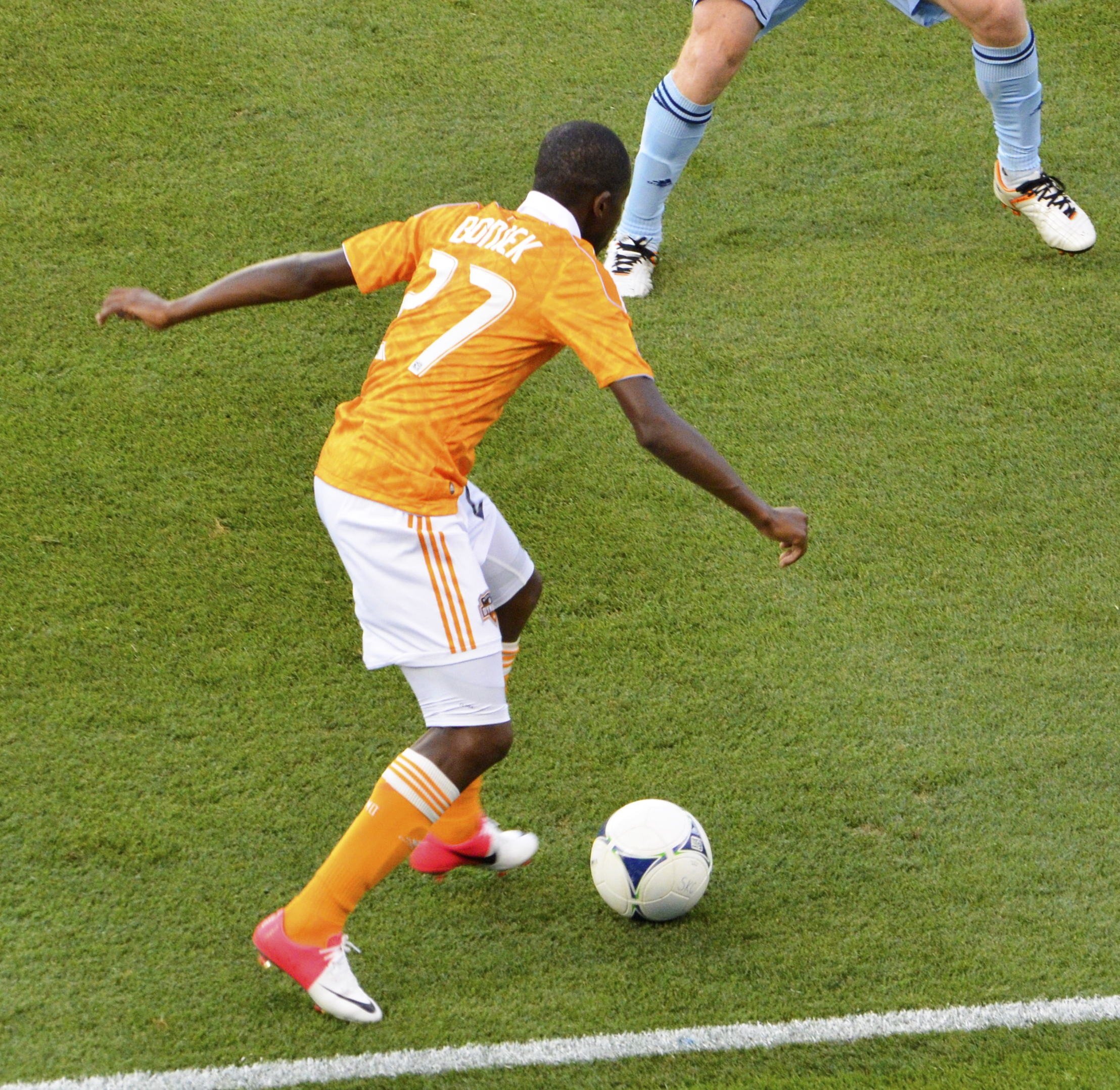
Honduran international, Oscar Boniek García, scored the opening goal of the second leg in the Eastern Conference championship.

A week later, the second leg of the Conference Finals, commenced, with United hosting the Dynamo at Robert F. Kennedy Memorial Stadium in Washington, D.C. In front of a season-record crowd of 20,015, the match was closely knitted for the first 20 minutes, before United began to dominate possession throughout the match, requiring Houston's Hall to make a couple acrobatic saves in the first half, primarily off of shots from United's Chris Korb and Branko Boskovic. Eleven minutes prior to halftime, Houston found themselves on a counterattack, as Adam Moffat successfully managed to penetrate the left flank of United's back line, sliding a pass to García. García, drilled the ball past United's Bill Hamid giving Houston a very likely series-clinching goal, leading 4–1 on aggregate. Plagued with injuries, United's depleted attack failed to generate much offensive output until the 80th minute, when Boskovic dribbled past three Houston defenders and slotted the match-tying goal, slashing Houston's series lead to two goals.

From there, United's attack looked more menacing for the final 10 minutes of the match, but neither side was able to capitalize on the wide-open play, as the match ended in a 1–1 draw, and Houston clinched their second consecutive Eastern Conference postseason championship, and berth into the MLS Cup final and CONCACAF Champions League.

== Match details ==
December 1, 2012
1:30 pm PST

Los Angeles Galaxy	3–1	Houston Dynamo
Gonzalez 60'; Donovan 65' (pen.); Keane 90+4' (pen.)	Report	Carr 44'

The Home Depot Center, Carson, California
Attendance: 30,510
Referee: Silviu Petrescu

Los Angeles Galaxy	Houston Dynamo

GK	12	(Puerto Rico) Josh Saunders
RB	5	(United States) Sean Franklin
CB	4	(United States) Omar Gonzalez
CB	21	(United States) Tommy Meyer
LB	2	(United States) Todd Dunivant
CM	19	(Brazil) Juninho		(substituted off) 76'
CM	23	(England) David Beckham		(substituted off) 89'
RM	9	(Sweden) Christian Wilhelmsson		(substituted off) 74'
LM	18	(United States) Mike Magee
CF	7	(Republic of Ireland) Robbie Keane
CF	10	(United States) Landon Donovan (c)	(yellow card) 90+2'
Substitutes:
GK	24	(United States) Brian Perk
DF	20	(Guam) A. J. DeLaGarza
DF	35	(United States) Bryan Gaul
MF	8	(Brazil) Marcelo Sarvas		(substituted on) 89'
MF	26	(United States) Michael Stephens		(substituted on) 76'
FW	11	(United States) Pat Noonan
FW	14	(United States) Edson Buddle		(substituted on) 74'
Manager:
(United States) Bruce Arena

GK	1	(United States) Tally Hall	(yellow card) 90+3'
RB	8	(United States) Kofi Sarkodie		(substituted off) 77'
CB	32	(United States) Bobby Boswell	(yellow card) 64'
CB	4	(Jamaica) Jermaine Taylor
LB	26	(United States) Corey Ashe
CM	13	(United States) Ricardo Clark
CM	16	(Scotland) Adam Moffat		(substituted off) 71'
RW	27	(Honduras) Boniek García
LW	11	(United States) Brad Davis (c)
CF	3	(United States) Calen Carr		(substituted off) 59'
CF	12	(United States) Will Bruin
Substitutes:
GK	24	(United States) Tyler Deric
DF	31	(Canada) André Hainault
MF	17	(Brazil) Luiz Camargo
MF	23	(England) Giles Barnes		(substituted on) 71'
FW	9	(Senegal) Macoumba Kandji		(substituted on) 59'
FW	15	(United States) Cam Weaver
FW	25	(United States) Brian Ching		(substituted on) 77'
Manager:
(United States) Dominic Kinnear

MLS Cup MVP:
Omar Gonzalez (Los Angeles Galaxy)

Assistant referees:
Daniel Belleau
Darren Clark
Fourth official:
Hilario Grajeda

=== Statistics ===
Overall
	Los Angeles Galaxy	Houston Dynamo
Goals scored	3	1
Total shots	9	11
Shots on target	4	6
Saves	2	4
Corner kicks	3	9
Fouls committed	17	13
Offsides	3	2
Yellow cards	1	2
Red cards	0	0

== See also ==
- 2012 in American soccer
- 2012 Major League Soccer season
- MLS Cup
- MLS Cup Playoffs
