= 2012 MLS Cup playoffs =

2012 edition of the MLS playoffs

Tournament details
- Country: United States; Canada
- Teams: 10

Final positions
- Champions: Los Angeles Galaxy (4th title)
- Runners-up: Houston Dynamo
- Semifinalists: D.C. United; Seattle Sounders FC

Tournament statistics
- Matches played: 15
- Goals scored: 34 (2.27 per match)
- Attendance: 335,348 (22,357 per match)
- Top goal scorer(s): (Republic of Ireland) Robbie Keane (6 goals)

The 2012 MLS Cup playoffs was the seventeenth post-season tournament culminating the Major League Soccer regular season. The tournament began on October 31, and culminated on December 1, 2012 with MLS Cup 2012, the seventeenth league championship for MLS, won by the Los Angeles Galaxy 3–1 over the Houston Dynamo. It was the second year that the playoffs included ten teams, and the first playoff series since 2006 in which teams could not cross-conference brackets. The top five teams in both the Eastern and Western conferences of the league earned berths, with the top three clubs in each conference earning direct byes to the conference semifinals. The fourth and fifth-place finishers of both conferences played in a single-elimination play-in match.

The play-in winner played their respective conference regular season champion in the conference semifinals, which was a two-leg aggregate series, without the away goals rule enforced. For the first time in MLS Cup playoffs history, each conference championship was also a two-leg aggregate series, as opposed to the traditional single elimination match. The MLS Cup championship still remained a single match, but the team with the stronger regular season record, the Los Angeles Galaxy, hosted the final at their home venue.

The LA Galaxy were the defending champions, having defeated Houston Dynamo 1–0 in last year's championship.

Both finalists directly entered the 2013–14 CONCACAF Champions League, with the champion earning a Pot A seed. They were joined by the San Jose Earthquakes, the Supporters' Shield winner, and Sporting Kansas City, the 2012 U.S. Open Cup champion. However, none of these berths were available to the league's three Canadian teams, which instead participated in the Canadian Championship for that country's single berth in the CONCACAF Champions League.

== Format ==
For 2012, the league's previous system of "wild card" qualification—which had the potential for "crossover" series in which one team could play in the other conference's bracket—was scrapped. Instead, the top five teams in each conference qualified for the playoffs and the two conference brackets were entirely separate. The first round of each conference was a one-off match between the fourth and fifth-placed teams, similar to the previous wild card system, with the fourth-placed team hosting. The first round winners advanced to play the teams with their respective conference's best regular season records in the conference semifinals.

The conference semifinals and conference finals were conducted in a home-and-away aggregate-goal format, with the higher-seeded team hosting the second leg. If the teams were tied after two games, a 30-minute extra time period (divided into two 15-minute periods) was played, followed by a penalty shoot-out if necessary. The away goals rule or golden goal were not used.

In the case of ties in the first round and MLS Cup, extra time and a penalty shoot-out would be used in the same manner as above.

== Qualified teams ==
Eastern Conference

Pos	Team	Pld	W	L	T	GF	GA	GD	Pts	Qualification
1	Sporting Kansas City	34	18	7	9	42	27	+15	63	MLS Cup Conference Semifinals
2	D.C. United	34	17	10	7	53	43	+10	58	MLS Cup Conference Semifinals
3	New York Red Bulls	34	16	9	9	57	46	+11	57	MLS Cup Conference Semifinals
4	Chicago Fire	34	17	11	6	46	41	+5	57	MLS Cup Knockout Round
5	Houston Dynamo	34	14	9	11	48	41	+7	53	MLS Cup Knockout Round
6	Columbus Crew	34	15	12	7	44	44	0	52	
7	Montreal Impact	34	12	16	6	45	51	−6	42	
8	Philadelphia Union	34	10	18	6	37	45	−8	36	
9	New England Revolution	34	9	17	8	39	44	−5	35	
10	Toronto FC	34	5	21	8	36	62	−26	23	

Source: MLS

Western Conference

Pos	Team	Pld	W	L	T	GF	GA	GD	Pts	Qualification
1	San Jose Earthquakes	34	19	6	9	72	43	+29	66	MLS Cup Conference Semifinals
2	Real Salt Lake	34	17	11	6	46	35	+11	57	MLS Cup Conference Semifinals
3	Seattle Sounders FC	34	15	8	11	51	33	+18	56	MLS Cup Conference Semifinals
4	LA Galaxy	34	16	12	6	59	47	+12	54	MLS Cup Knockout Round
5	Vancouver Whitecaps FC	34	11	13	10	35	41	−6	43	MLS Cup Knockout Round
6	FC Dallas	34	9	13	12	42	47	−5	39	
7	Colorado Rapids	34	11	19	4	44	50	−6	37	
8	Portland Timbers	34	8	16	10	34	56	−22	34	
9	Chivas USA	34	7	18	9	24	58	−34	30	

Source: MLS

=== Tiebreak rules ===
If two or more teams were tied in standings on points, the following tiebreak rules applied:

1. Goals scored
2. Goal differential
3. Fewest disciplinary points in the official points table (foul – 1 pt, first yellow – 3 pts, second yellow – 5 pts, straight red – 6 pts, disciplinary commission suspension – 6 pts, etc.)
4. Away goals scored
5. Away goal differential
6. Home goals scored
7. Home goal differential
8. Coin toss (two teams) or drawing of lots (three or more teams)

== Bracket ==
Knockout round
E4	Chicago Fire	1
E5	Houston Dynamo	2
W4	Los Angeles Galaxy	2
W5	Vancouver Whitecaps FC	1

Conference semifinals
E1	Sporting Kansas City	0	1	1
E5	Houston Dynamo	2	0	2
Eastern Conference
E2	D.C. United	1	1	2
E3	New York Red Bulls	1	0	1
W1	San Jose Earthquakes	1	1	2
W4	Los Angeles Galaxy	0	3	3
Western Conference
W2	Real Salt Lake	0	0	0
W3	Seattle Sounders FC	0	1	1

Conference finals
E5	Houston Dynamo	3	1	4
E2	D.C. United	1	1	2
W4	Los Angeles Galaxy	3	1	4
W3	Seattle Sounders FC	0	2	2

MLS Cup
E5	Houston Dynamo	1
W4	Los Angeles Galaxy	3

== Knockout round ==
=== Eastern Conference ===
October 31
8:00 pm CDT

Chicago Fire	1–2	Houston Dynamo
Alex 83'	Report	Bruin 12', 46'

Toyota Park, Bridgeview, Illinois
Attendance: 10,923
Referee: Baldomero Toledo

=== Western Conference ===
November 1
7:30 pm PDT

Los Angeles Galaxy	2–1	Vancouver Whitecaps FC
Magee 69'; Donovan 73' (pen.)	Report	Mattocks 3'

The Home Depot Center, Carson, California
Attendance: 14,703
Referee: Silviu Petrescu

== Conference semifinals ==
=== Eastern Conference ===
November 4
2:30 pm CST

Houston Dynamo	2–0	Sporting Kansas City
Moffat 18'; Bruin 75'	Report

BBVA Compass Stadium, Houston, Texas
Attendance: 20,689
Referee: Edvin Jurisevic
November 7
8:00 pm CST

Sporting Kansas City	1–0	Houston Dynamo
Sinovic 64'	Report

Livestrong Sporting Park, Kansas City, Kansas
Attendance: 20,894
Referee: Allen Chapman

Houston Dynamo won 2–1 on aggregate.

November 3
8:00 pm EDT

D.C. United	1–1	New York Red Bulls
Miller 61' (o.g.)	Report	Hamid 65' (o.g.)

RFK Stadium, Washington, D.C.
Attendance: 17,556
Referee: Jair Marrufo
November 8
7:30 pm EST

New York Red Bulls	0–1	D.C. United
	Recap	DeLeon 88'

Red Bull Arena, Harrison, New Jersey
Attendance: 14,035
Referee: Mark Geiger

D.C. United won 2–1 on aggregate.

Note: While D.C. United won the right to host the second leg as the higher seed, the order of the legs was reversed due to the effects of Hurricane Sandy. The second leg was originally scheduled for November 7, but was postponed by one day due to snow.

=== Western Conference ===
November 4
6:00 pm PST

Los Angeles Galaxy	0–1	San Jose Earthquakes
	Report	Bernárdez 90+4'

The Home Depot Center, Carson, California
Attendance: 27,000
Referee: Ricardo Salazar
November 7
8:00 pm PST

San Jose Earthquakes	1–3	Los Angeles Galaxy
Gordon 82'	Report	Keane 21', 34'; Magee 39'

Buck Shaw Stadium, Santa Clara, California
Attendance: 10,744
Referee: Kevin Stott

Los Angeles Galaxy won 3–2 on aggregate.

November 2
7:00 pm PDT

Seattle Sounders FC	0–0	Real Salt Lake
	Report

CenturyLink Field, Seattle, Washington
Attendance: 34,941
Referee: Hilario Grajeda
November 8
7:30 pm MST

Real Salt Lake	0–1	Seattle Sounders FC
	Report	Martínez 81'

Rio Tinto Stadium, Sandy, Utah
Attendance: 19,657
Referee: Chris Penso

Seattle Sounders won 1–0 on aggregate.

== Conference finals ==
=== Eastern Conference ===
November 11
5:00 pm CST

Houston Dynamo	3–1	D.C. United
Hainault 51'; Bruin 68'; Sarkodie 81'	Report	DeLeon 27'

BBVA Compass Stadium, Houston, Texas
Attendance: 22,101
Referee: Ricardo Salazar
November 18
4:00 pm EST

D.C. United	1–1	Houston Dynamo
Bošković 83'	Report	García 34'

RFK Stadium, Washington, D.C.
Attendance: 20,015
Referee: Baldomero Toledo

Houston Dynamo won 4–2 on aggregate.

=== Western Conference ===
November 11
6:00 pm PST

Los Angeles Galaxy	3–0	Seattle Sounders FC
Keane 46', 67'; Magee 64'	Report

The Home Depot Center, Carson, California
Attendance: 27,000
Referee: Jair Marrufo
November 18
6:00 pm PST

Seattle Sounders FC	2–1	Los Angeles Galaxy
Johnson 12'; Scott 57'	Report	Keane 68' (pen.)

CenturyLink Field, Seattle, Washington
Attendance: 44,575
Referee: Mark Geiger

Los Angeles Galaxy won 4–2 on aggregate.

== MLS Cup 2012 ==
December 1, 2012
1:30 pm PST

Los Angeles Galaxy	3–1	Houston Dynamo
Gonzalez 60'; Donovan 65' (pen.); Keane 90+4' (pen.)	Report	Carr 44'

The Home Depot Center, Carson, California
Attendance: 30,510
Referee: Silviu Petrescu

== Player statistics ==
Note: Statistics only for post-season games.

=== Top goalscorers ===
Rank	Player	Club	Goals	Minutes played
1	(Republic of Ireland) Robbie Keane	Los Angeles Galaxy	6	540
2	(United States) Will Bruin	Houston Dynamo	4	491
3	(United States) Mike Magee	Los Angeles Galaxy	3	540
4	(United States) Nick DeLeon	D.C. United	2	360
4	(United States) Landon Donovan	Los Angeles Galaxy	2	444
6	(United States) Alan Gordon	San Jose Earthquakes	1	42
6	(Brazil) Alex	Chicago Fire	1	45
6	(Jamaica) Darren Mattocks	Vancouver Whitecaps FC	1	59
6	(Honduras) Víctor Bernárdez	San Jose Earthquakes	1	102
6	(United States) Seth Sinovic	Sporting Kansas City	1	180
6	(United States) Zach Scott	Seattle Sounders FC	1	183
6	(Honduras) Mario Martínez	Seattle Sounders FC	1	201
6	(United States) Eddie Johnson	Seattle Sounders FC	1	205
6	(Canada) Andre Hainault	Houston Dynamo	1	215
6	(United States) Calen Carr	Houston Dynamo	1	251
6	(Montenegro) Branko Bošković	D.C. United	1	321
6	(Scotland) Adam Moffat	Houston Dynamo	1	456
6	(United States) Kofi Sarkodie	Houston Dynamo	1	527
6	(Honduras) Boniek Garcia	Houston Dynamo	1	540
6	(United States) Omar Gonzalez	Los Angeles Galaxy	1	540

=== Top assists ===
Rank	Player	Club	Assists
1	(United States) Sean Franklin	Los Angeles Galaxy	4
2	(United States) Brad Davis	Houston Dynamo	3
2	(United States) Landon Donovan	Los Angeles Galaxy	3
4	(United States) Calen Carr	Houston Dynamo	2
4	(Brazil) Juninho	Los Angeles Galaxy	2
6	(Scotland) Adam Moffat	Houston Dynamo	1
6	(Honduras) Boniek García	Houston Dynamo	1
6	(United States) Brad Evans	Seattle Sounders FC	1
6	(Germany) Christian Tiffert	Seattle Sounders FC	1
6	(Sweden) Christian Wilhelmsson	Los Angeles Galaxy	1
6	(England) David Beckham	Los Angeles Galaxy	1
6	(Colombia) Fredy Montero	Seattle Sounders FC	1
6	(United States) Graham Zusi	Sporting Kansas City	1
6	(United States) Justin Morrow	San Jose Earthquakes	1
6	(Sierra Leone) Kei Kamara	Sporting Kansas City	1
6	(Colombia) Lionard Pajoy	D.C. United	1
6	(Brazil) Luiz Camargo	Houston Dynamo	1
6	(Brazil) Maicon Santos	D.C. United	1
6	(England) Matt Watson	Vancouver Whitecaps FC	1
6	(United States) Mike Magee	Los Angeles Galaxy	1
6	(Ghana) Patrick Nyarko	Chicago Fire	1
6	(Republic of Ireland) Robbie Keane	Los Angeles Galaxy	1
6	(United States) Robbie Russell	D.C. United	1
6	(United States) Tommy Meyer	Los Angeles Galaxy	1
6	(United States) Will Bruin	Houston Dynamo	1
6	(United States) Zach Scott	Seattle Sounders FC	1

== See also ==
- 2012 in American soccer
- 2012 U.S. Open Cup
