= 2011 MLS Cup playoffs =

2011 edition of the MLS playoffs

Tournament details
- Country: United States; Canada
- Teams: 10

Final positions
- Champions: Los Angeles Galaxy (3rd title)
- Runners-up: Houston Dynamo
- Semifinalists: Sporting Kansas City; Real Salt Lake

Tournament statistics
- Matches played: 13
- Goals scored: 27 (2.08 per match)
- Attendance: 258,582 (19,891 per match)
- Top goal scorer(s): (United States) Landon Donovan (United States) Mike Magee (Costa Rica) Álvaro Saborío (3 goals each)

The 2011 MLS Cup playoffs was the sixteenth post-season tournament culminating the Major League Soccer regular season. The tournament began on October 26 with the play-in round and concluded on November 20 with MLS Cup. It was the first playoff series to include ten clubs, two more than the traditional eight. Six of the ten teams earned a direct bye into the conference semifinals, while the four wildcard teams played a single-elimination match to earn a berth into the conference semis. These eight clubs played in a single-elimination tournament en route to playoffs championship MLS Cup 2011, which doubled as the league championship for the 2011 MLS season altogether.

The defending MLS Cup champions were the Colorado Rapids, who beat FC Dallas 2–1 in the 2010 championship.

As the preliminary round was eliminated from the CONCACAF Champions League, both finalists directly entered the 2012–13 CONCACAF Champions League group stage, along with the Supporters' Shield winner for the regular season and the 2011 U.S. Open Cup champion. However, none of these berths were available to the league's two Canadian teams, which instead participated in the Canadian Championship for that country's single berth in the CONCACAF Champions League.

== Format ==
The format for the tournament was announced on February 23, 2011. The top three clubs in each of the league's two conferences earned the six automatic spots in the conference semifinals. The wild card entrants, seeded seventh through tenth, entered based upon their overall position in a single table of the league standings. The new format was assembled so that the weakest seed to qualify out of the wild card rounds would have to play the Supporters' Shield winner. The other entrant played the conference champion that did not win the Shield.

The playoffs began with the play-in round, which contained the wild card seeds. The first and second-placed wild card seeds (seventh and eight place, respectively) hosted the third and fourth-placed wild card seeds (ninth and tenth place, respectively). The winners of each play-in proper earned a berth into the conference semifinals of the playoffs.

Following the play-in round was the conference semifinals, where the two play-in round winners joined the six clubs that earned a direct bye into this round. The conference semifinals were a two-legged, aggregate series, in which each team played their opponent twice: once at home, and once away. The team with the most goals accumulated over the two-match series won the series and qualified for the conference championship. In this round, the lowest-seeded wild card team to advance played against the Supporters' Shield winner (regular season champion). The other wild card seed played against either the Eastern or Western Conference regular season champion, depending on which conference champion won the Supporters' Shield. The conference semifinals also featured the conference runners-up and third-place finishers from both the Eastern and Western Conference.

The conference finals featured the winners from the conference semifinals. This round was a one-legged affair, in which the higher seeded club hosted the lower seed. The winner of these matches earned two berths (one from each conference) into the 2011 MLS Cup championship match, and a guaranteed berth in the 2012–13 CONCACAF Champions League.

The Eastern Conference and Western Conference bracket winners met in the MLS Cup final, which was held at the pre-determined neutral venue. This year, the final was held at the Home Depot Center in Carson, California, home of the Los Angeles Galaxy and Chivas USA. The MLS Cup winner was crowned league champion for the 2011 MLS season.

== Qualified teams ==
The top three clubs from each conference, based on final point totals, qualified for the playoffs. From among the remaining clubs, the top four qualified as wild cards, entering the play-in round to narrow the field to eight. The Los Angeles Galaxy were the first MLS club to secure a playoff berth, qualifying with a 1–0 win over the Colorado Rapids on September 9.

=== Conference standings ===
==== Eastern table ====
Pos	Team	Pld	W	L	T	GF	GA	GD	Pts	Qualification
1	Sporting Kansas City	34	13	9	12	50	40	+10	51	MLS Cup Conference Semifinals
2	Houston Dynamo	34	12	9	13	45	41	+4	49	MLS Cup Conference Semifinals
3	Philadelphia Union	34	11	8	15	44	36	+8	48	MLS Cup Conference Semifinals
4	Columbus Crew	34	13	13	8	43	44	−1	47	MLS Cup Play-In Round
5	New York Red Bulls	34	10	8	16	50	44	+6	46	MLS Cup Play-In Round
6	Chicago Fire	34	9	9	16	46	45	+1	43	
7	D.C. United	34	9	13	12	49	52	−3	39	
8	Toronto FC	34	6	13	15	36	59	−23	33	
9	New England Revolution	34	5	16	13	38	58	−20	28	

Source: MLS

==== Western table ====
Pos	Team	Pld	W	L	T	GF	GA	GD	Pts	Qualification
1	LA Galaxy	34	19	5	10	48	28	+20	67	MLS Cup Conference Semifinals
2	Seattle Sounders FC	34	18	7	9	56	37	+19	63	MLS Cup Conference Semifinals
3	Real Salt Lake	34	15	11	8	44	36	+8	53	MLS Cup Conference Semifinals
4	FC Dallas	34	15	12	7	42	39	+3	52	MLS Cup Play-In Round
5	Colorado Rapids	34	12	9	13	46	42	+4	49	MLS Cup Play-In Round
6	Portland Timbers	34	11	14	9	40	48	−8	42	
7	San Jose Earthquakes	34	8	12	14	40	45	−5	38	
8	Chivas USA	34	8	14	12	41	43	−2	36	
9	Vancouver Whitecaps FC	34	6	18	10	35	55	−20	28	

Source: MLS

=== Overall standings ===
Pos	Team	Pld	W	L	T	GF	GA	GD	Pts	Qualification
1	LA Galaxy (S, C)	34	19	5	10	48	28	+20	67	CONCACAF Champions League
2	Seattle Sounders FC	34	18	7	9	56	37	+19	63	CONCACAF Champions League
3	Real Salt Lake	34	15	11	8	44	36	+8	53	CONCACAF Champions League
4	FC Dallas	34	15	12	7	42	39	+3	52	
5	Sporting Kansas City	34	13	9	12	50	40	+10	51	
6	Houston Dynamo	34	12	9	13	45	41	+4	49	CONCACAF Champions League
7	Colorado Rapids	34	12	9	13	44	41	+3	49	
8	Philadelphia Union	34	11	8	15	44	36	+8	48	
9	Columbus Crew	34	13	13	8	43	44	−1	47	
10	New York Red Bulls	34	10	8	16	50	44	+6	46	
11	Chicago Fire	34	9	9	16	46	45	+1	43	
12	Portland Timbers	34	11	14	9	40	48	−8	42	
13	D.C. United	34	9	13	12	49	52	−3	39	
14	San Jose Earthquakes	34	8	12	14	40	45	−5	38	
15	Chivas USA	34	8	14	12	41	43	−2	36	
16	Toronto FC	34	6	13	15	36	59	−23	33	CONCACAF Champions League
17	New England Revolution	34	5	16	13	38	58	−20	28	
18	Vancouver Whitecaps FC	34	6	18	10	35	55	−20	28	

Source: MLS
Rules for classification: 1) points; 2) head-to-head record; 3) goal difference; 4) number of goals scored
(C) Champions; (S) Supporters' Shield

=== Tiebreakers ===
1. Head-to-head (points-per-match average)
2. Overall goal differential
3. Overall total goals scored
4. Tiebreakers 1–3 applied only to matches on the road
5. Tiebreakers 1–3 applied only to matches at home
6. Fewest team disciplinary points in the League Fair Play table
7. Coin toss

If more than two clubs were tied, once a club advanced through any step, the process reverted to Tiebreaker 1 among the remaining tied clubs recursively until all ties were resolved.

== Bracket ==
Play-in round
8	Colorado Rapids	1
9	Columbus Crew	0
7	FC Dallas	0
10	New York Red Bulls	2

Conference semifinals
E1	Sporting Kansas City	2	2
WC	Colorado Rapids	0	0
Eastern Conference
E2	Houston Dynamo	2	1
E3	Philadelphia Union	1	0
W1	LA Galaxy	1	2
WC	New York Red Bulls	0	1
Western Conference
W2	Seattle Sounders FC	0	2
W3	Real Salt Lake	3	0

Conference finals
E1	Sporting Kansas City	0
E2	Houston Dynamo	2
W3	Real Salt Lake	1
W1	LA Galaxy	3

MLS Cup
E2	Houston Dynamo	0
W1	LA Galaxy	1

Note: The LA Galaxy, as MLS Supporters' Shield winners, were assured of playing the lower seeded Wild Card series winner (New York Red Bulls) in the Conference Semifinals, while Sporting Kansas City would play the higher seeded Wild Card series winner (Colorado Rapids).

== Schedule ==
Major League Soccer released the schedule for its playoffs on August 9, 2011.

Key

- SS = MLS Supporters' Shield winner
- E1/W1 = Eastern or Western Conference winner
- E2/W2 = Eastern or Western Conference runner-up
- E3/W3 = Eastern or Western Conference third place
- WC1 = Top wildcard seed (7th place overall)
- WC2 = Second wildcard seed (8th place overall)
- WC3 = Third wildcard seed (9th place overall)
- WC4 = Fourth wildcard seed (10th place overall)

== Play-in round ==
October 26
8:00 pm CDT

FC Dallas	0–2	New York Red Bulls
	Report	Lindpere 61'; Henry 90+8'

Pizza Hut Park, Frisco, Texas
Attendance: 10,017
Referee: Ricardo Salazar

October 27
8:00 pm MDT

Colorado Rapids	1–0	Columbus Crew
Cummings 45+1'	Report

Dick's Sporting Goods Park, Commerce City, Colorado
Attendance: 7,803
Referee: Jorge Gonzalez

== Conference semifinals ==
=== Eastern Conference ===
October 30
5:30 pm MDT

Colorado Rapids	0–2	Sporting Kansas City
	Report	Bunbury 49', 59' (pen.)

Dick's Sporting Goods Park, Commerce City, Colorado
Attendance: 8,601
Referee: Baldomero Toledo
November 2
7:00 pm CDT

Sporting Kansas City	2–0	Colorado Rapids
Collin 28'; Sapong 76'	Report

Livestrong Sporting Park, Kansas City, Kansas
Attendance: 18,565
Referee: Kevin Stott

Sporting Kansas City won 4–0 on aggregate.

October 30
5:00 pm EDT

Philadelphia Union	1–2	Houston Dynamo
Le Toux 7'	Report	Hainault 6'; Carr 30'

PPL Park, Chester, Pennsylvania
Attendance: 18,539
Referee: Jair Marrufo
November 3
7:30 pm CDT

Houston Dynamo	1–0	Philadelphia Union
Ching 45+3'	Report

Robertson Stadium, Houston, Texas
Attendance: 24,749
Referee: Ricardo Salazar

Houston Dynamo won 3–1 on aggregate.

=== Western Conference ===
October 30
3:00 pm EDT

New York Red Bulls	0–1	Los Angeles Galaxy
	Report	Magee 15'

Red Bull Arena, Harrison, New Jersey
Attendance: 22,663
Referee: Alex Prus
November 3
8:00 pm PDT

Los Angeles Galaxy	2–1	New York Red Bulls
Magee 42'; Donovan 75' (pen.)	Report	Rodgers 4'

Home Depot Center, Carson, California
Attendance: 20,000
Referee: Hilario Grajeda

Los Angeles Galaxy won 3–1 on aggregate.

October 29
8:00 pm MDT

Real Salt Lake	3–0	Seattle Sounders FC
Saborío 41', 53'; Grabavoy 88'	Report

Rio Tinto Stadium, Sandy, Utah
Attendance: 17,067
Referee: Mark Geiger
November 2
7:00 pm PDT

Seattle Sounders FC	2–0	Real Salt Lake
Alonso 56' (pen.); Neagle 61'	Report

CenturyLink Field, Seattle, Washington
Attendance: 36,021
Referee: Jair Marrufo

Real Salt Lake won 3–2 on aggregate.

== Conference finals ==
Host depended on the higher seeded team. Single elimination match.

=== Eastern Conference ===
November 6
4:30 pm CST

Sporting Kansas City	0–2	Houston Dynamo
	Report	Hainault 53'; Costly 87'

Livestrong Sporting Park, Kansas City, Kansas
Attendance: 20,839
Referee: Mark Geiger

=== Western Conference ===
November 6
6:00 pm PST

Los Angeles Galaxy	3–1	Real Salt Lake
Donovan 23' (pen.); Magee 58'; Keane 68'	Report	Saborío 25'

The Home Depot Center, Carson, California
Attendance: 23,437
Referee: Jorge Gonzalez

== MLS Cup 2011 ==
November 20, 2011
6:00 pm PST

Los Angeles Galaxy	1–0	Houston Dynamo
Donovan 72'	Report

The Home Depot Center, Carson, California
Attendance: 30,281
Referee: Ricardo Salazar

== Player statistics ==
Note: Statistics only for post-season games.

=== Top goalscorers ===
Rank	Player	Club	Goals
1	(United States) Landon Donovan	Los Angeles Galaxy	3
1	(United States) Mike Magee	Los Angeles Galaxy	3
1	(Costa Rica) Álvaro Saborío	Real Salt Lake	3
4	(United States) Teal Bunbury	Sporting Kansas City	2
4	(Canada) André Hainault	Houston Dynamo	2
6	(Cuba) Osvaldo Alonso	Seattle Sounders FC	1
6	(United States) Calen Carr	Houston Dynamo	1
6	(France) Aurélien Collin	Sporting Kansas City	1
6	(Honduras) Carlos Costly	Houston Dynamo	1
6	(Jamaica) Omar Cummings	Colorado Rapids	1
6	(United States) Ned Grabavoy	Real Salt Lake	1
6	(France) Thierry Henry	New York Red Bulls	1
6	(Republic of Ireland) Robbie Keane	Los Angeles Galaxy	1
6	(France) Sébastien Le Toux	Philadelphia Union	1
6	(Estonia) Joel Lindpere	New York Red Bulls	1
6	(United States) Lamar Neagle	Seattle Sounders FC	1
6	(England) Luke Rodgers	New York Red Bulls	1
6	(United States) C. J. Sapong	Sporting Kansas City	1

=== Top assists ===
Rank	Player	Club	Assists
1	(England) David Beckham	Los Angeles Galaxy	3
2	(United States) Graham Zusi	Sporting Kansas City	2
3	(Morocco) Mehdi Ballouchy	New York Red Bulls	1
3	(Brazil) Luiz Camargo	Houston Dynamo	1
3	(Brazil) Júlio César	Sporting Kansas City	1
3	(United States) Brian Ching	Houston Dynamo	1
3	(United States) Brad Davis	Houston Dynamo	1
3	(United States) Landon Donovan	Los Angeles Galaxy	1
3	(United States) Michael Farfan	Philadelphia Union	1
3	(France) Thierry Henry	New York Red Bulls	1
3	(Republic of Ireland) Robbie Keane	Los Angeles Galaxy	1
3	(Japan) Kosuke Kimura	Colorado Rapids	1
3	(Colombia) Fredy Montero	Seattle Sounders FC	1
3	(Argentina) Javier Morales	Real Salt Lake	1
3	(Colombia) Jamison Olave	Real Salt Lake	1
3	(United States) Chris Wingert	Real Salt Lake	1
