= MLS Cup 2011 =

2011 edition of the MLS Cup

- Event: MLS Cup
Los Angeles Galaxy	Houston Dynamo
1	0
- Date: November 20, 2011
- Venue: The Home Depot Center, Carson, California, US
- MLS Cup MVP: Landon Donovan (LA Galaxy)
- Referee: Ricardo Salazar
- Attendance: 30,281
- Weather: Rain, 53 °F (12 °C)

MLS Cup 2011, the 16th edition of Major League Soccer's championship match, was played between the Houston Dynamo and the Los Angeles Galaxy to decide the champion of the 2011 season. The soccer match was played at the Home Depot Center in Carson, California on November 20, 2011. Los Angeles won their third championship, defeating Houston 1–0 off a 72nd-minute goal from Galaxy captain Landon Donovan. David Beckham and Robbie Keane assisted the game's lone goal. With the win, the Galaxy became the first team since the Columbus Crew in 2008 to win both the Supporters' Shield and MLS Cup in the same year.

For Los Angeles, it was a league-record seventh appearance in the MLS Cup final, while it was Houston's third appearance in the league final. Both the Galaxy and the Dynamo qualified for the 2012–13 CONCACAF Champions League. The Galaxy earned their third successive berth, while the Dynamo earned their third ever berth in the Champions League and their first since the 2009–10 edition.

== Road to the final ==
Los Angeles Galaxy
Round
Houston Dynamo

Western Conference
Team	GP	W	L	T	GF	GA	GD	Pts
Los Angeles Galaxy	34	19	5	10	48	28	+20	67
Seattle Sounders FC	34	18	7	9	56	37	+19	63
Real Salt Lake	34	15	11	8	44	36	+8	53
FC Dallas	34	15	12	7	42	39	+3	52

Regular season

Eastern Conference
Team	GP	W	L	T	GF	GA	GD	Pts.
Sporting Kansas City	34	13	9	12	50	40	+10	51
Houston Dynamo	34	12	9	13	45	41	+4	49
Philadelphia Union	34	11	8	15	44	36	+8	48
Columbus Crew	34	13	13	8	43	44	−1	47

Opponent
Result
Legs
Playoffs
Opponent
Result
Legs
New York Red Bulls
3–1
2–1 home; 1–0 away
Conf. Semifinals
Philadelphia Union
3–1
1–0 home; 2–1 away
Real Salt Lake
3–1
3–1 home
Conference Finals
Sporting Kansas City
2–0
2–0 away

=== Los Angeles Galaxy ===
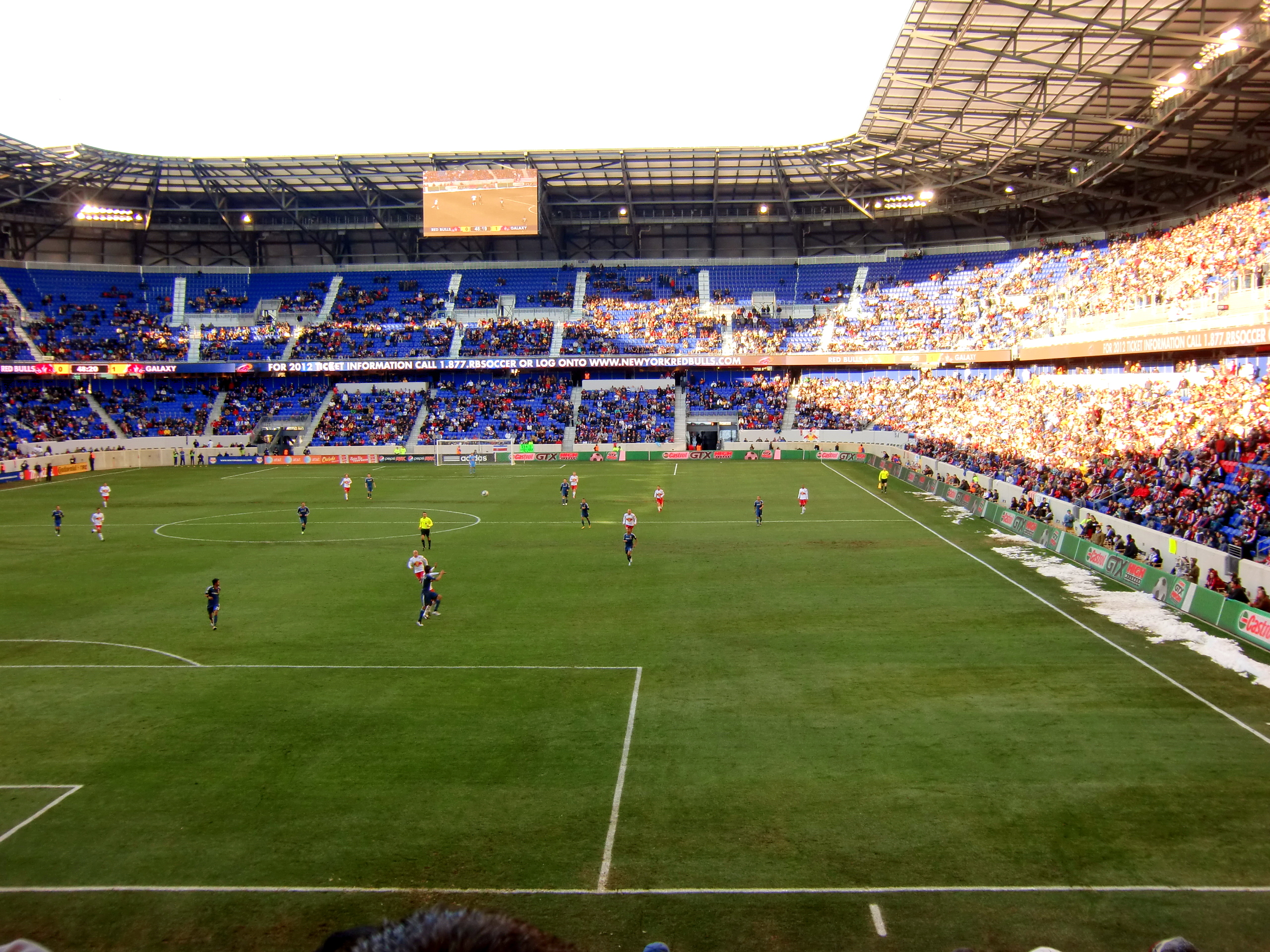
Los Angeles Galaxy opened their playoff campaign on October 31, traveling to Red Bull Arena (above) to take on the New York Red Bulls. The Galaxy won 1–0.

Ahead of the 2011 MLS Cup playoffs, the Los Angeles Galaxy successfully defended the Supporters' Shield, winning it for the second consecutive year, and for the fourth time overall, tying D.C. United for the most regular season championships earned. The Galaxy became the third straight team to win back-to-back regular season titles. The Galaxy earned the Shield on October 8, two weeks prior to the end of the regular season, and finished the season with a 19–5–10, posting the second total number of points (67) ever by a league premier.

As Shield winners, the Galaxy earned the benefit of playing the lowest seeded team to advance from the newly created wildcard round. In the Western Conference Semifinals, the Galaxy played the New York Red Bulls, who had the tenth best regular season record, which was the lowest seeded team in the playoffs. The first leg of the two-match, aggregate series began on October 30, 2011 with the opening leg being played at New York's Red Bull Arena. The opening leg ended with a critical away victory for Los Angeles, as the Galaxy earned a 1–0 victory off of a goal from Mike Magee. Following the match, controversy erupted after New York's Rafael Márquez threw the match ball at Los Angeles' Landon Donovan's ankles. Immediately, Márquez was confronted by Los Angeles' Adam Cristman and Juninho which caused some pushing and shoving, before several players on both sides attempted to break up the skirmish. Both Marquez and Juninho were subsequently red-carded, Márquez for throwing a ball at an opposing player, and Juninho for striking an opponent, who was New York's Stephen Keel.

On November 3, the second leg was played at the Galaxy's home ground, The Home Depot Center. With a capped seating capacity due to the match being played on a school night, only 20,000 seats were available. In the fourth minute, New York's Luke Rodgers tied the aggregate series at 1–1 and gave New York a 1–0 lead in the second leg. Magee once again scored against his former club in the 42nd minute, tying the match, and giving the Galaxy a 2–1 aggregate lead over the Red Bulls. In the 75th minute, Donovan scored off a penalty kick to give the Galaxy a 3–1 aggregate lead and 2–1 lead in the match, which ended in the final score of the match.

Upon victory, the Galaxy hosted the third-seeded Western Conference team, Real Salt Lake, in the 2011 MLS Western Conference Championship. The game, a rematch of the 2009 MLS Cup final, resulted in a 3–1 victory for the Galaxy.

The 2011 MLS Cup was the Galaxy's first MLS Cup Victory in regulation. The 2002 and the 2005 MLS Cup wins were won in overtime.

=== Houston Dynamo ===
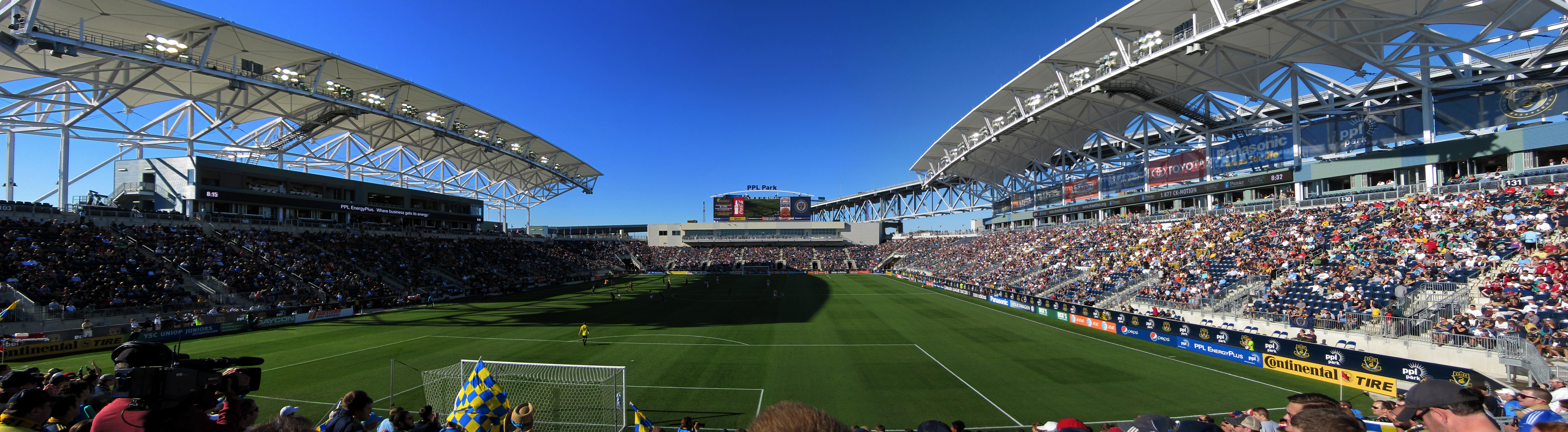
During Houston's run to the MLS Cup final, the Dynamo picked up their first win at PPL Park (pictured above).

The Houston Dynamo spent the first half of the regular season in inconsistent form, finding themselves in a slew of playoff bubble teams. In mid-September, the club hit solid form and finished their final six matches with four wins, no losses and two draws. After finishing second in the Eastern Conference, Houston received a direct bye to the Eastern Conference Semifinals. As the second-seeded club, Houston was paired up against the Philadelphia Union, who qualified for the playoffs for the first time in their history.

Against the Union, the Dynamo posted victories in each leg of the two-match, aggregate series, winning the round by a score of 3–1. The first match, played on October 29 at Philadelphia's PPL Park, marked Houston's first road playoff win. Houston defender and Canadian international André Hainault scored the opening goal in the fifth minute of play, only for Philadelphia's Sébastien Le Toux to tie the match two minutes later. In the 30th minute, Houston's Calen Carr scored the go-ahead goal, which ended up being the game-winning goal. Goalkeeper Tally Hall made 10 saves, six in the second half, to preserve the win.

The second leg of the conference semifinals was played at Robertson Stadium, Houston's final match at the stadium due to the opening of BBVA Compass Stadium in 2012. The game's lone goal came from longtime Houston striker Brian Ching, who scored three minutes into stoppage time in the first half of play on an assist by longtime teammate Brad Davis. It was Ching's sixth playoff goal, and his first playoff goal for the club since the 2007 MLS Cup playoffs.

Since Sporting Kansas City, the top seed in the Eastern Conference, defeated the Colorado Rapids in their conference semifinal, the Dynamo traveled to Kansas City, Kansas to take on Sporting for the 2011 MLS Eastern Conference Championship. The two sides finished two points apart from one another during the regular season, as Sporting claimed the Eastern Conference regular season title after a 1–0 victory at D.C. United. The match was played at Sporting's Livestrong Sporting Park, the same location where Sporting defeated the Dynamo 3–0 in regular season play on September 10. The championship, however, played in Houston's favor, as the Dynamo posted a 2–0 victory at Kansas City. Despite an injury to Davis, one of the finalists for the MLS MVP award, Hainault scored his second playoff goal in the 53rd minute, while Houston loanee and Honduran international Carlo Costly scored a buffer goal in the 87th minute to seal the club's third trip to the MLS Cup championship.

== Pre-match ==
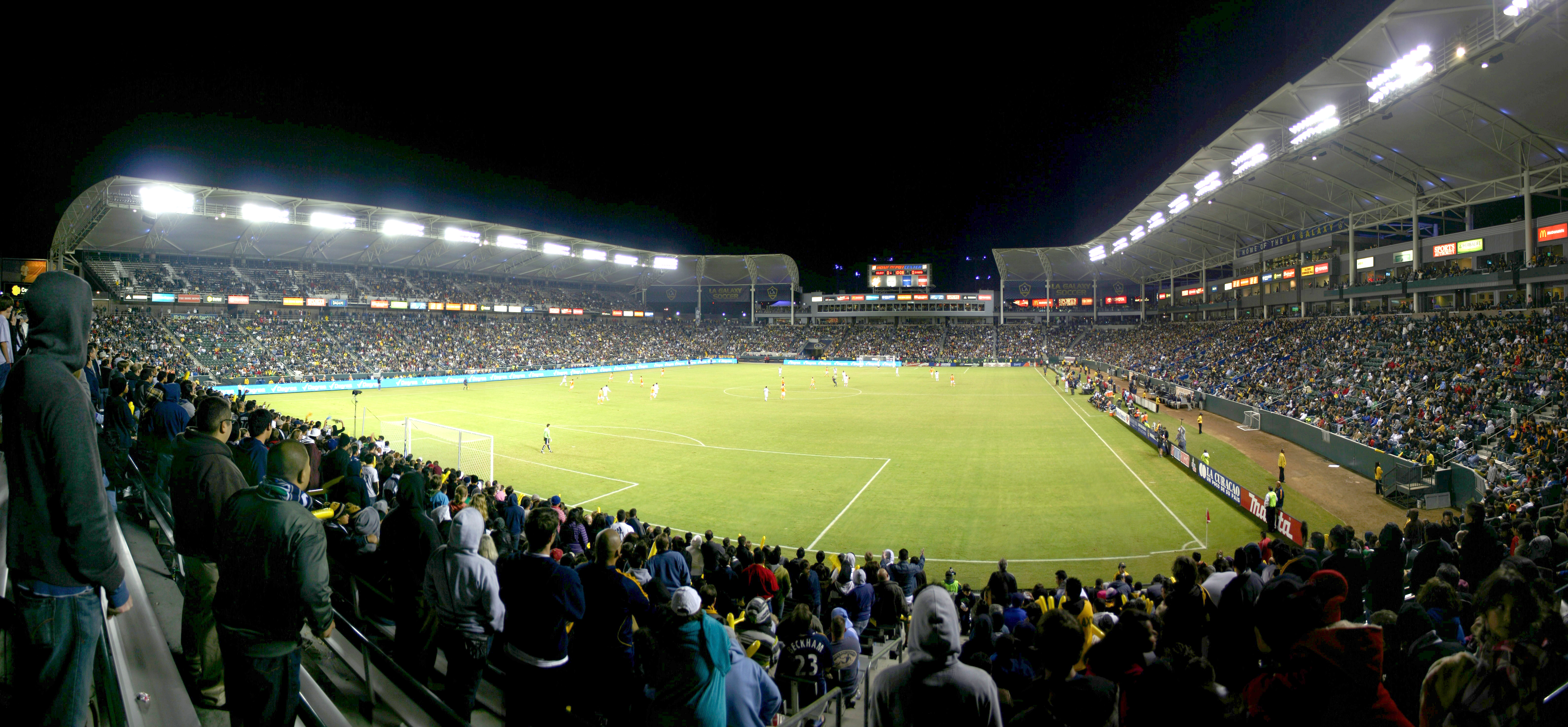
The Home Depot Center, located in the Los Angeles suburb of Carson, was the host venue for the 2011 MLS championship.

=== Venue selection ===
On the afternoon of May 10, 2011, Major League Soccer Commissioner Don Garber announced that the Home Depot Center in Carson, California would host the MLS Cup championship. The final, which became the fourth league championship held at the stadium, gave it the record for the most MLS Cup finals held. The last time the Home Depot Center hosted the MLS Cup final was in 2008, when the Columbus Crew defeated Red Bull New York.

The Home Depot Center was the home ground of two Los Angeles–based clubs at the time, the Los Angeles Galaxy and C.D. Chivas USA.

=== Television ===
The match kicked off at 9:00 pm EST and was broadcast on ESPN for the third consecutive year, as well as Galavisión in the U.S. and on TSN2 in Canada. Additionally, it was aired during prime time for the third consecutive year.

== Match details ==
November 20, 2011
6:00 pm PST

Los Angeles Galaxy	1–0	Houston Dynamo
Donovan 72'	Report

The Home Depot Center, Carson, California
Attendance: 30,281
Referee: Ricardo Salazar

Los Angeles Galaxy	Houston Dynamo

Los Angeles Galaxy
GK	12	(Puerto Rico) Josh Saunders
RB	5	(United States) Sean Franklin
CB	4	(United States) Omar Gonzalez
CB	20	(United States) A. J. DeLaGarza
LB	2	(United States) Todd Dunivant
CM	19	(Brazil) Juninho
CM	23	(England) David Beckham	(yellow card) 82'
RM	10	(United States) Landon Donovan (c)	(yellow card) 90+4'
LM	18	(United States) Mike Magee
CF	14	(Republic of Ireland) Robbie Keane
CF	17	(United States) Adam Cristman	(yellow card) 40'	(substituted off) 57'
Substitutions:
GK	1	(Jamaica) Donovan Ricketts
DF	3	(United States) Gregg Berhalter
DF	6	(United States) Frankie Hejduk
FW	7	(United States) Jovan Kirovski
MF	8	(Trinidad and Tobago) Chris Birchall		(substituted on) 57'
MF	26	(United States) Michael Stephens
MF	30	(Uruguay) Paolo Cardozo
Manager:
(United States) Bruce Arena

Houston Dynamo
GK	1	(United States) Tally Hall
RB	31	(Canada) André Hainault	(yellow card) 74'
CB	32	(United States) Bobby Boswell	(yellow card) 13'
CB	20	(United States) Geoff Cameron
LB	4	(Jamaica) Jermaine Taylor
CM	17	(Brazil) Luiz Camargo
CM	16	(Scotland) Adam Moffat
RW	5	(United States) Danny Cruz		(substituted off) 78'
LW	26	(United States) Corey Ashe		(substituted off) 84'
CF	25	(United States) Brian Ching (c)
CF	8	(United States) Calen Carr		(substituted off) 66'
Substitutions:
GK	24	(United States) Tyler Deric
DF	2	(United States) Eddie Robinson
MF	7	(United States) Colin Clark		(substituted on) 78'
MF	10	(Jamaica) Je-Vaughn Watson		(substituted on) 84'
FW	12	(United States) Will Bruin
DF	21	(United States) Hunter Freeman
FW	29	(Honduras) Carlo Costly		(substituted on) 66'
Manager:
(United States) Dominic Kinnear

MLS Cup MVP:

Landon Donovan (Los Angeles Galaxy)

Assistant referees:

Craig Lowry
Peter Manikowski

Fourth official:

Hilario Grajeda

Match rules

- 90 minutes.
- 30 minutes of extra time if necessary.
- Penalty shoot-out if scores still level.
- Seven named substitutes.
- Maximum of three substitutions.

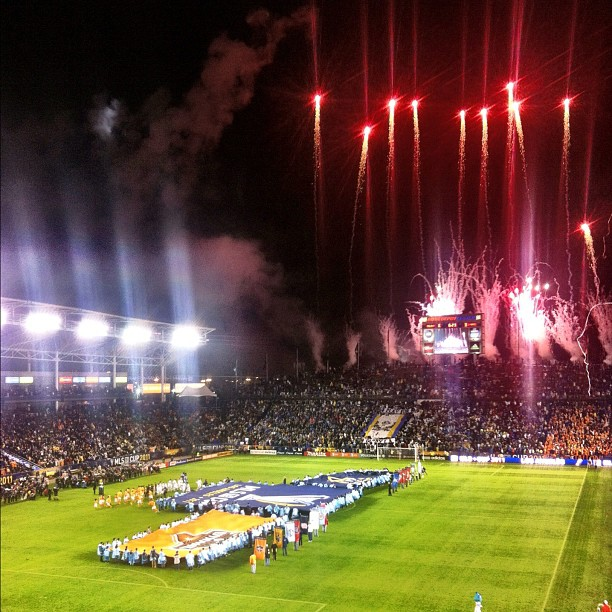
The scene in the Home Depot Center prior to the start of the match

=== Statistics ===
Overall
Statistic	Los Angeles Galaxy	Houston Dynamo
Goals scored	1	0
Total shots	14	8
Shots on target	3	1
Saves	5	2
Corner kicks	7	1
Fouls committed	10	13
Offsides	2	5
Yellow cards	3	2
Red cards	0	0
