= André Hainault =

Canadian soccer player (born 1986)

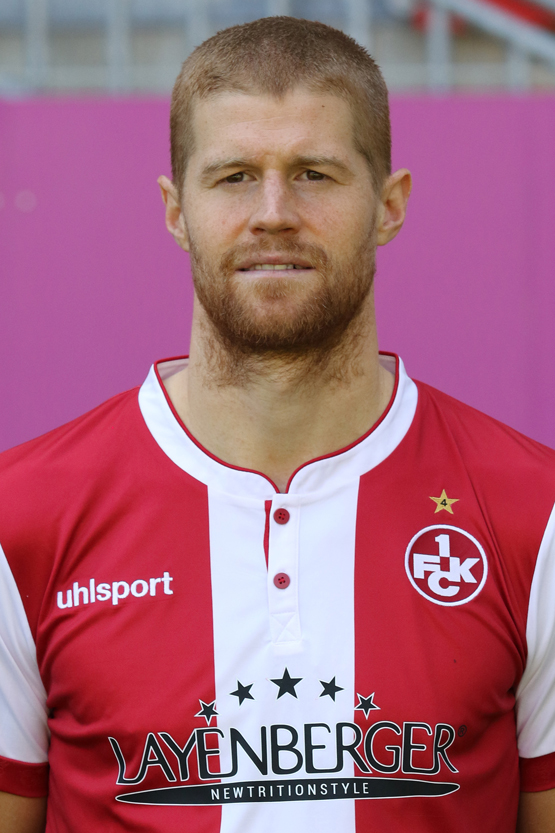
- Hainault in 2018

Personal information
- Date of birth: June 17, 1986 (age 40)
- Place of birth: Vaudreuil-Dorion, Quebec, Canada
- Height: 1.84 m (6 ft 0 in)
- Position: Defender

Team information
- Current team: 1. FC Kaiserslautern
- Number: 35

Youth career
- Hudson Hawks

Senior career*
Years	Team	Apps	(Gls)
2004–2005	Montreal Impact	3	(0)
2005–2009	Baník Most	66	(4)
2008	→ Sparta Prague (loan)	2	(0)
2009–2012	Houston Dynamo	104	(6)
2013	Ross County	8	(1)
2013–2015	VfR Aalen	40	(1)
2015–2017	1. FC Magdeburg	33	(2)
2018–2022	1. FC Kaiserslautern	57	(2)

International career^{‡}
2002–2003	Canada U17	14	(0)
2003–2005	Canada U20	18	(0)
2008	Canada U23	4	(0)
2006–2017	Canada	44	(2)
- * Club domestic league appearances and goals as of November 29, 2020 ‡ National team caps and goals as of March 29, 2017

André Hainault (born June 17, 1986) is a former Canadian international soccer player who last played as a defender for 1. FC Kaiserslautern.

== Club career ==
=== Czech Republic ===
Born in Vaudreuil-Dorion, Quebec, Hainault began his professional career with Montreal Impact in the USL First Division in 2004, and played three competitive games for the team prior to signing with small Czech side SIAD Most. Hainault played there alongside former star striker Horst Siegl and made 46 appearances for Most in the Gambrinus liga and the Czech 2. Liga. He scored a game-winning goal for them in the 88th minute of his league debut against Slovácko in February 2006. He also spent a brief time on loan with Sparta Prague before returning to North America.

=== Major League Soccer ===
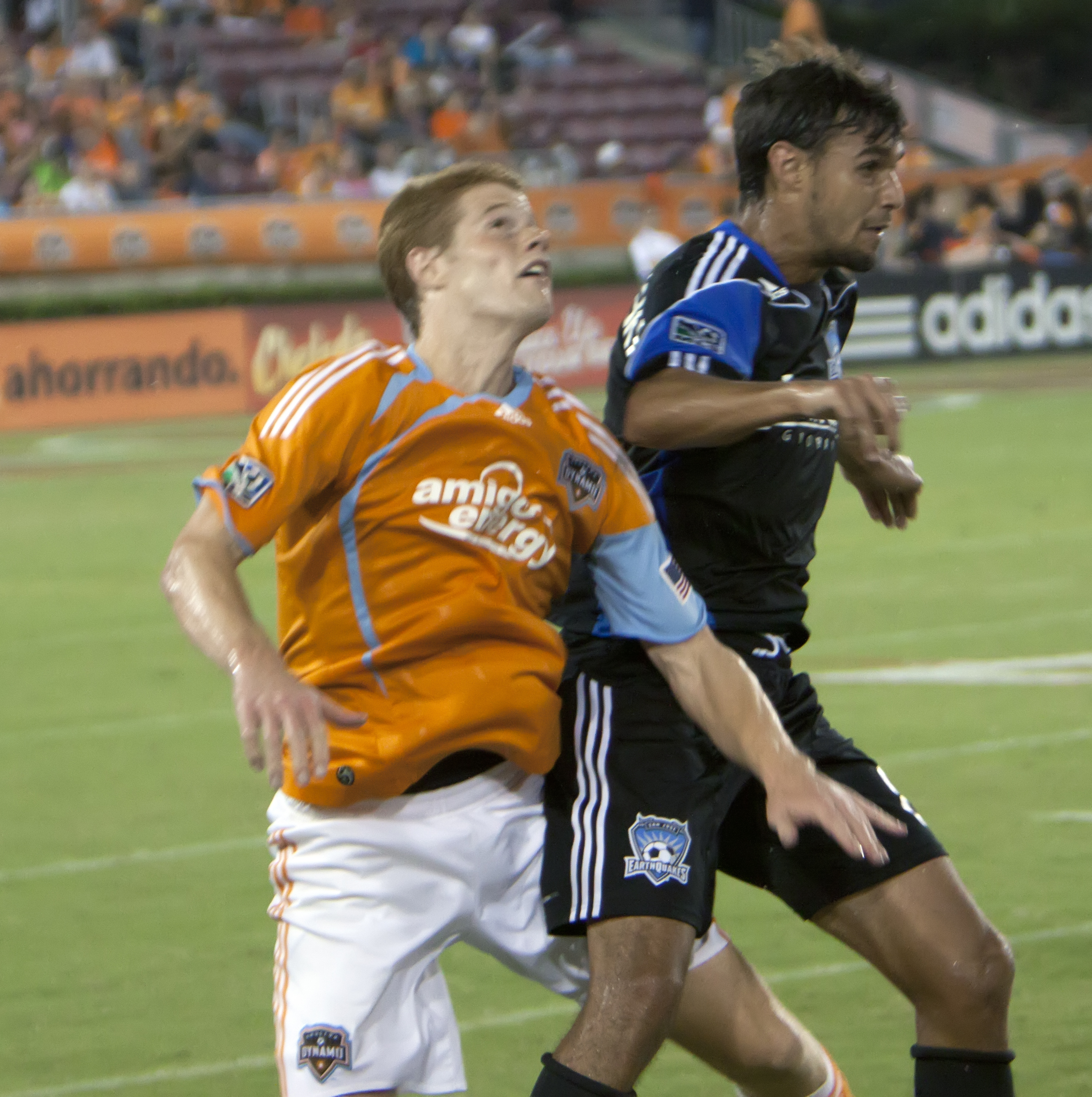
Hainault defending San Jose Earthquakes forward Chris Wondolowski

The Houston Dynamo announced on April 14, 2009, that they had secured Hainault's international transfer certificate from Most; he had been training with the team throughout the 2009 pre-season. Hainault was signed to a standard four-year MLS contract and made a base salary of $55,125 in 2009. He made his MLS debut for Houston on May 3, 2009, coming on as a substitute for Wade Barrett in a game against New England Revolution.

Hainault turned down a call-up for two 2014 FIFA World Cup qualification matches due to an important club match-up against the Portland Timbers on October 15, 2011. It turned out to be a major factor in the game, with Hainault scoring his first goal of the season and opening goal of the game from a Brad Davis free kick. Houston went on to a 2–0 away win, clinching a playoff spot. Later in 2011, he scored two playoff goals, including the opening goal in a 2–0 win in the Eastern Conference Final of the 2011 MLS Cup Playoffs, sending the Dynamo to their first MLS Cup since 2007. Houston fell to the Los Angeles Galaxy on November 20, 2011, in a 1–0 final, with a goal from Landon Donovan.

After an off-season with much speculation of a transfer to Bordeaux, Hainault remained in Houston for 2012 and scored the game-winning goal over Chivas USA in the season opener on March 11, 2012.

=== Scottish Premier League ===
After the 2012 Major League Soccer season, a season in which Hainault was dropped from the starting line-up for the final two months, he signed for Scottish Premier League club Ross County on a free transfer. Former Dynamo teammate and former Ross County player Adam Moffat sold him on the decision. It was announced on January 29 that Hainault had been approved for a work permit to officially join the club. Hainault made his debut for the club on February 23, 2013 against Motherwell as a 90th-minute substitute for Paul Lawson. On May 19, 2013, Hainault became an instant legend with the Ross County faithful with a 10-yard volleyed goal in the 1–0 win against fierce local rivals Inverness Caledonian Thistle to end the Inverness team's hopes of qualifying for Europe for the first time ever. The goal was Hainault's first for the club. Following the season, despite reports that Ross County were set to re-sign him,

=== Germany ===
On July 4, 2013, it was announced that Hainault would join German club VfR Aalen of the 2. Bundesliga on a two-year contract beginning with the 2013–14 2. Bundesliga season. Hainault played 40 matches for Aalen, but saw his contract not renewed in 2015. He then joined newly promoted 3. Liga side 1. FC Magdeburg on a free transfer, signing a one-year contract. On April 20, 2016, he extended his contract with 1. FC Magdeburg until 2018. After missing significant time in the previous two years to injury, he returned to the lineup regularly and helped lead Magdeburg to promotion to the 2. Bundesliga in 2018.

In May 2018, Hainault turned down a new contract offer from the club, and signed a two-year contract with 1. FC Kaiserslautern in the offseason. In August 2020, he signed a one-year contract with 1. FC Kaiserslautern as a leader of the reserves and a "stand-by" player for the first team. On August 12, 2022, Hainault retired from active play and now serves as an Assistant Coach for the U-23 side at FSV Mainz 05.

== International career ==
Hainault played all three of Canada's matches at the 2005 FIFA World Youth Championship in the Netherlands. He made his senior debut for Canada in a November 2006 friendly match against Hungary. By December 2009, he had earned a total of 15 caps, scoring one goal. He has so far represented Canada in three FIFA World Cup qualification matches. On March 29, 2011, Hainault scored his second international goal from a Will Johnson corner kick in friendly versus Belarus.

== International goals ==
No.	Date	Venue	Opponent	Score	Result	Competition
1.	11 October 2008	Estadio Olímpico Metropolitano, San Pedro Sula, Honduras	Honduras	1–1	1–3	2010 FIFA World Cup qualification
2.	29 March 2011	Antalya Atatürk Stadium, Antalya, Turkey	Belarus	1–0	1–0	Friendly
