= Adam Moffat =

Scottish footballer (born 1986)

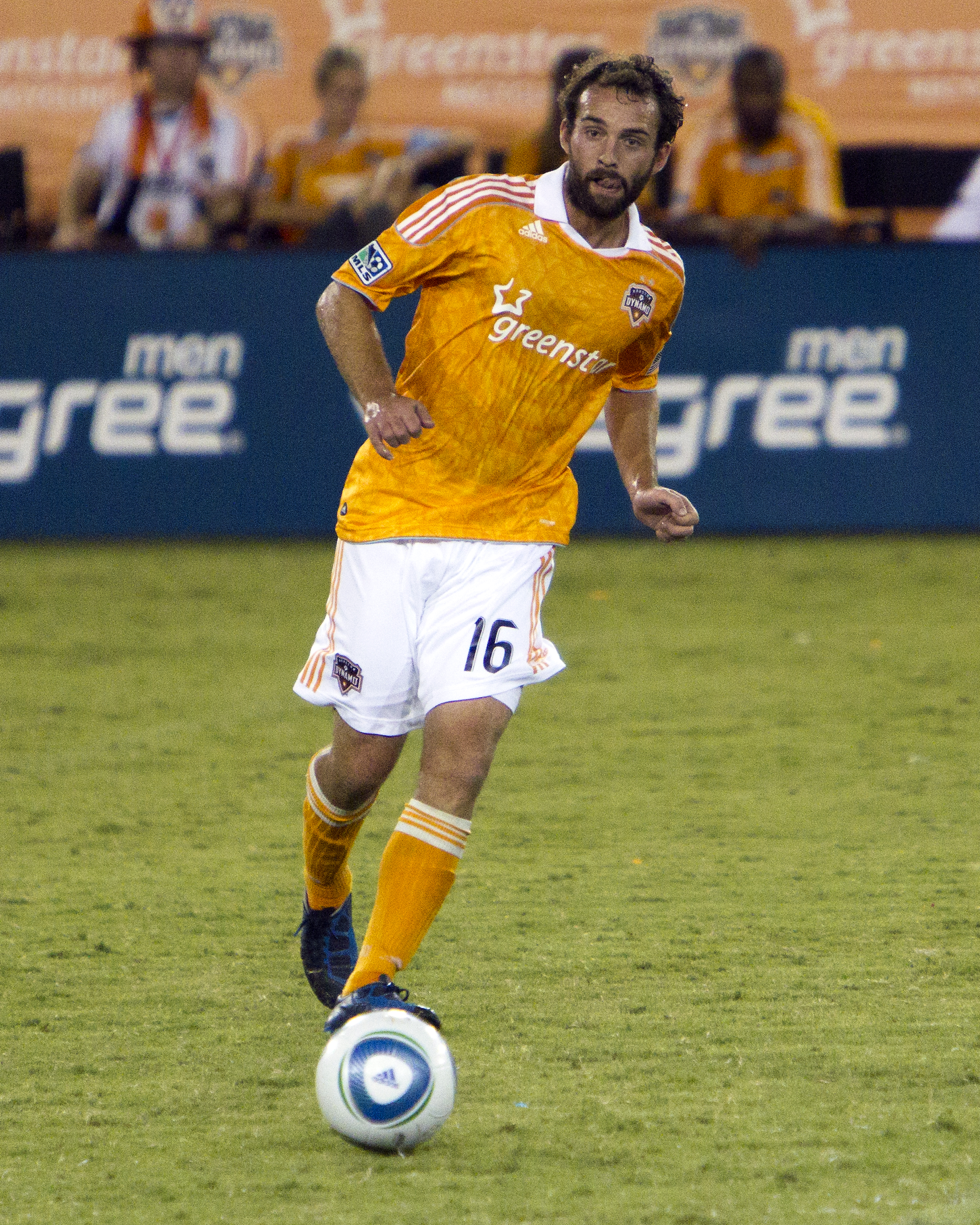
- Picture in August 2011

Personal information
- Full name: Adam John William Moffat
- Date of birth: 15 May 1986 (age 40)
- Place of birth: Glasgow, Scotland
- Position: Midfielder

Youth career
- Rangers
- Ross County

Senior career*
Years	Team	Apps	(Gls)
2005–2006	Ross County	2	(0)
2006–2007	Elgin City	27	(6)
2007	Cleveland City Stars	19	(8)
2007–2010	Columbus Crew	44	(5)
2011	Portland Timbers	4	(0)
2011–2013	Houston Dynamo	62	(7)
2013	Seattle Sounders FC	6	(0)
2014	FC Dallas	20	(0)
2015–2016	New York Cosmos	41	(10)
2017–2018	Sacramento Republic	31	(1)
Total		256	(37)
- * Club domestic league appearances and goals

Adam John William Moffat (born 15 May 1986) is a Scottish former professional footballer who played as a midfielder and spent the majority of his career playing in the various professional leagues in the United States. He attended Gryffe High School in Houston, Scotland before beginning his career in Scottish football with Ross County and Elgin City, Moffat has played in the United States since 2007, initially with Cleveland City Stars. He then played for Major League Soccer (MLS) teams Columbus Crew, Portland Timbers, Houston Dynamo and Seattle Sounders FC and FC Dallas prior to joining the New York Cosmos in 2015 and finishing his career with Sacramento Republic. He won the MLS Cup with Columbus in 2008.

== Career ==
=== Early career ===
Moffat began his career in the youth teams of Scottish giants Rangers before moving on to Ross County in search of first team opportunities. He began to break into the Ross County first team under manager Alex Smith, making his first team debut late in May 2005. Soon after the 2004–05 season, Ross County fired Smith and brought in John Robertson as manager. The new manager did not rate Moffat as much as his predecessor and Moffat's opportunities declined.

=== Elgin City ===
Moffat moved to Scottish Third Division side Elgin City ahead of the 2006–07 season in search of more playing time. While with Elgin City, Moffat worked part time at a Gap store to make ends meet as he would only make a few hundred pounds per game. He made his debut for Elgin City on 9 September 2006 in a 2–0 loss to Dumbarton. Moffat scored his first goal for Elgin City on 23 September in a 2–1 loss to Berwick Rangers. On 9 December, he scored the winner in a Scottish Cup match against Buckie Thistle. He scored twice on 14 April to give Elgin City a 2–1 win over East Stirlingshire. Moffat made 29 appearances and scored 7 goals across all competitions during the season. The season was a struggle for the team, as they finished second bottom in the table, or 41st out of 42 Scottish league teams. While at Elgin city, Moffat contemplated retiring from football to go to university.

=== Cleveland City Stars ===
As Moffat's season with Elgin City was wrapping up, he received a phone call from one of his old coaches, Richard Huxford. Huxford's friend Martin Rennie was the head coach of the Cleveland City Stars, a new team in the USL Second Division, the third tier of American soccer. Moffat agreed to go play in the United States for the summer, planning to return to Scotland after the season. Moffat only made $600 a month and lived with a host family while in Cleveland.

Moffat and the Stars finished the regular season with just one loss in the league and a second-place finish, with Moffat contributing 8 goals and 2 assists. In the playoffs, Cleveland would lose 1–0 in the first round to the Harrisburg City Islanders. Moffat was named to the USL Second Division All-League First Team as a result of his good performances during the season.

=== Columbus Crew ===
Moffat's good performances for Cleveland had caught the attention Sigi Schmid, then the head coach of MLS club Columbus Crew, who invited Moffat to come practice with the team. On 20 September 2007, Moffat signed a contract with the Crew. On 20 October, he made his debut for the Crew, a 3–2 win over D.C. United in the regular season finale.

On 29 March, In the first game of the 2008 season, Moffat scored his first MLS goal to help Columbus to a 2–0 win over Toronto FC. On 3 May he scored again, this time in a 2–1 win over the Kansas City Wizards. On 5 June, Moffat tore his ACL in his left knee during training. The injury would keep him out for the rest of the season. Despite being without Moffat, the Crew would win the Supporters' Shield as well as MLS Cup.

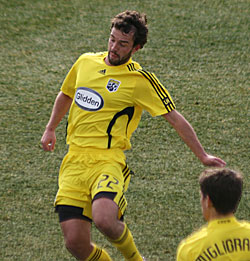
Moffat playing for Columbus in 2008

Moffat made his first appearance of the 2009 season on 11 April, a 1–1 draw with the Colorado Rapids. He suffered a hamstring strain in early May that forced him to miss 2 months. He returned from the injury on 25 July, coming on as a substitute in a 3–2 win against Toronto FC. On 8 August, Moffat scored his first goal of the season in a 3–0 win over the San Jose Earthquakes. Moffat made 12 appearances in the league as he helped Columbus win a second straight Supporters' Shield. He did not appear in the playoffs, with the Crew being knocked out in the first round by Real Salt Lake. Moffat did play every game in the group stage for the 2009–10 CONCACAF Champions League, helping the crew finish second in their group.

The Crew started their 2010 season on 9 March with a 2–2 draw against Deportivo Toluca in leg 1 of the 2009–10 CONCACAF Champions League quarterfinals, with Moffat starting the match. He would start the second leg as well, but Columbus would lose 3–2. Their first MLS game of the season came on 27 March, with Moffat playing the full 90 of a 2–0 win over Toronto. He scored his first goal of the season in their next match to help Columbus get a 2–2 draw with FC Dallas. He scored again on 3 July to help the Crew to a 2–1 win against the Chicago Fire. Moffat made 24 appearances in the league to help the Crew finish second in the Eastern Conference and qualify for the playoffs. Columbus lost to the Colorado Rapids in the first round of the playoffs, with Moffat not appearing in either leg. He did appear 4 times in the group stage for the 2010–11 CONCACAF Champions League, helping Columbus finish second and advance out of the group stage.

=== Portland Timbers ===
On 24 November 2010, Moffat was selected by the Portland Timbers in the 2010 MLS Expansion Draft. On 19 March 2011, Moffat made his Timbers debut in a 3–1 loss to the Colorado Rapids in the opening match of the 2011 season. Moffat struggled to get playing time in Portland, appearing in only 4 of the 18 MLS games while he was with the Timbers.

=== Houston Dynamo ===
On 21 July 2011, Moffat was traded to Houston Dynamo along with allocation money in exchange for Lovel Palmer, Mike Chabala, and an international roster spot. He made his Dynamo debut on 23 July, coming off the bench in a 3–0 loss to Chivas USA. He made his first start on 30 July, helping Houston to a 3–0 win over Seattle Sounders FC. On 14 August, Moffat scored his first goal for the Dynamo to help Houston defeat Portland 2–1. The goal, a strike from 40 yards out into the top right corner, was named as the MLS Goal of the Week. After missing a game due to receiving two yellow cards on 17 August, Moffat started every remaining game of the regular season for the Dynamo. On 23 October, Moffat scored once and added an assist to help the Dynamo to a 3–1 win over the LA Galaxy in the final game of the regular season. The goal, which was named as the MLS Goal of the Week, saw Moffat intercept a pass in midfield, dribble for a few yards, and then smash the ball into the top right corner from over 40 yards out. Moffat helped the Dynamo finish the regular season strong and earn a 2 seed in the Eastern Conference. In the playoffs, Moffat played every minute as he helped the Dynamo reach MLS Cup 2011, where the Dynamo lose 1–0 to the LA Galaxy.

The Dynamo and Moffat opened the 2012 season on 11 March with a 1–0 win at Chivas USA, with Moffat getting the assist on André Hainault's winning goal in the 92nd minute. On 30 March, Moffat was suspended by the league for one game because of a reckless tackle he made on Seattle Sounders FC player Osvaldo Alonso. He returned from his suspension and recorded an assist in a 2–2 draw with the Columbus Crew. On 16 June he scored the winner in a 2–1 win over Texas Derby rivals FC Dallas. Moffat would miss three games in July due to a groin strain. On 19 August Moffat scored in the 82nd minute to give the Dynamo a 2–2 draw with Columbus. He would miss three games in September due to his groin strain. The Dynamo finished the season as a 5th seed in the East, qualifying for the playoffs. After beating the Chicago Fire in the first round, Moffat and the Dynamo faced off with Sporting Kansas City in the Conference Semifinals. In the first leg, Moffat rocketed a shot from 25 years out into the left side netting, helping Houston to a 2–0 win. They would lose in the second leg, but advance with an aggregate score if 2–1. After defeating D.C. United in the Conference Finals, the Dynamo faced off against the Galaxy in the final once again. The Dynamo would come up short for the second straight year, losing 3–1. During the group stage for the 2012–13 CONCACAF Champions League, Moffat started 3 games and scored once to help the Dynamo finish top of their group. After the 2012 season, Moffat signed a contract extension with the Dynamo.

Moffat and the Dynamo opened the 2013 season on 2 March with a 2–0 win over D.C. United. Moffat started both legs of the 2012–13 CONCACAF Champions League quarterfinals, but Houston lost to Santos Laguna 3–1 on aggregate. On 13 July Moffat scored twice to give Houston a 2–1 win over the New England Revolution. On 1 September he scored in the 90th minute to give the Dynamo a 1–1 draw with Chicago.

=== Seattle Sounders FC ===
On 13 September 2013, Moffat was traded to Seattle Sounders FC for Servando Carrasco and a second-round pick in the 2014 MLS SuperDraft. He made his debut for Seattle on 21 September, coming on as a substitute in a 1–1 draw with the LA Galaxy. Once in the playoffs, Moffat started the first-round game against the Colorado Rapids, helping the Sounders to a 2–0 win. Moffat would start both legs of the Conference Semifinals against Cascadia Cup rival Portland Timbers, but Seattle would lose both legs.

=== FC Dallas ===
On 13 December 2013, FC Dallas acquired Moffat from Seattle in exchange for Kenny Cooper and allocation money. He made his debut for Dallas on 15 March, getting the start in a 1–1 draw at Sporting Kansas City. He made 20 appearances in the regular season, coming in and out of the lineup in part due to multiple minor injuries. He would miss all three of Dallas's playoff games due to an injury as well.

At the conclusion of the 2014 season, Dallas declined their 2015 contract option on Moffat and he entered the 2014 MLS Re-Entry Draft. He was not selected by any MLS club.

=== New York Cosmos ===
On 2 January 2015, Moffat signed with New York Cosmos of the North American Soccer League. He made his Cosmos debut on 4 April 2015 against the Fort Lauderdale Strikers as an 83rd-minute substitute. Moffat played in 8 of the 10 games in the Spring Season to help the Cosmos to a first-place finish. He scored his first goal for New York on 8 August 2015, helping the Cosmos to a 3–3 draw with Fort Lauderdale. He would score again on 22 August in a 3–1 win over the Carolina Railhawks. Moffat missed the end of the regular season and all of the playoffs due to injury. The Cosmos would go on to win the championship in Moffat's absence.

Moffat and the Cosmos opened the 2016 Spring Season on 3 April with a 3–0 win over Ottawa Fury, with Moffat scoring the 3rd game when he chipped the Fury goalkeeper, who had come off his line, from just in front of the halfway line. He scored again in their next match to give New York a 2–0 win over Jacksonville Armada. Moffat would miss the final 7 games of the Spring due to an injury. He returned on 16 June, coming on as a substitute in a 1–0 win over New York City FC in a U.S. Open Cup match. Moffat and the Cosmos opened the Fall season on 2 July with a 2–1 win over Ottawa, with Moffat converting a penalty in the 9th minute to open the scoring. He scored again on 13 July in a 3–0 win over Jacksonville, rocketing a ball from outside the box into the upper left corner. After scoring once on 7 August to help the Cosmos to a 1 all draw with Rayo OKC, he scored twice in their next match as New York defeated the Tampa Bay Rowdies 3–2. He would score again 28 September to help the Cosmos beat the Railhawks 2–0. Moffat helped the Cosmos finish the Fall Season on top of the table. They defeated Rayo OKC in the first round of the playoffs before defeating Indy Eleven on penalties in the final, with Moffat playing every minute of the playoffs.

=== Sacramento Republic ===
Moffat joined United Soccer League side Sacramento Republic on 2 January 2017. He made his debut for Sacramento 26 March, getting the start in a 2–1 win over Seattle Sounders FC 2. He would only make 7 appearances in his first season in Sacramento due to a groin injury that required surgery in June.

Sacramento opened the 2018 season on 17 March with a 2–1 win over San Antonio FC, with Moffat coming off the bench during the match. On 7 April, Moffat scored his first goal for Sacramento in a 1–0 win over Sounders 2. He would score again on 16 May to help Sacramento beat San Francisco City FC 3–1 in a U.S. Open Cup match. He would play in 3 of the 4 Open Cup games Republic played that year, helping them reach the round of 16, where they lost 3–2 to LAFC. On 8 September, Moffat was injured, forcing him to miss the rest of the season.

Moffat announced his decision to retire from playing professional football on 30 November 2018.

== Career statistics ==
=== Club ===
Club Performance			League		National Cup		League Cup		Continental		Total	
Club	Season	Division	Apps	Goals	Apps	Goals	Apps	Goals	Apps	Goals	Apps	Goals
Scotland			League		Scottish Cup		League Cup		Europe		Total	
Ross County	2004–05	Scottish First Division	2	0	0	0	0	0	—		2	0
Ross County	2005–06	Scottish First Division	0	0	0	0	0	0	—		0	0
Ross County	Total		2	0	0	0	0	0	0	0	2	0
Elgin City	2006–07	Scottish Third Division	27	6	2	1	0	0	—		29	7
United States			League		US Open Cup		Playoffs		CONCACAF		Total	
Cleveland City Stars	2007	USL2	19	8	2	1	1	0	—		22	9
Columbus Crew	2007	MLS	1	0	0	0	—		—		1	0
Columbus Crew	2008	MLS	7	2	1	0	0	0	—		8	2
Columbus Crew	2009	MLS	12	1	0	0	0	0	6	0	18	1
Columbus Crew	2010	MLS	24	2	1	0	0	0	6	0	31	2
Columbus Crew	Total		44	5	2	0	0	0	12	0	58	5
Portland Timbers	2011	MLS	4	0	1	0	—		—		5	0
Houston Dynamo	2011	MLS	13	2	0	0	4	0	—		17	2
Houston Dynamo	2012	MLS	23	2	1	0	6	1	3	1	33	4
Houston Dynamo	2013	MLS	26	3	1	0	0	0	4	0	31	3
Houston Dynamo	Total		62	7	2	0	10	1	7	1	81	9
Seattle Sounders FC	2013	MLS	6	0	0	0	3	0	0	0	9	0
FC Dallas	2014	MLS	20	0	3	0	0	0	—		23	0
New York Cosmos	2015	NASL	19	2	2	0	0	0	—		21	2
New York Cosmos	2016	NASL	22	8	2	0	2	0	—		26	8
New York Cosmos	Total		41	10	4	0	2	0	0	0	47	10
Sacramento Republic	2017	USL	6	0	1	0	0	0	—		7	0
Sacramento Republic	2018	USL	25	1	3	1	0	0	—		28	2
Sacramento Republic	Total		31	1	4	1	0	0	0	0	35	2
Career total			256	37	20	3	16	1	19	1	311	42

== Personal life ==
Adam is married to Jennifer Lenhart, sister of former MLS player Steven Lenhart, who was Moffat's teammate with the Columbus Crew. He lives with his wife and three kids in Folsom, California, near Sacramento.

== Post-Playing ==
After retiring from the professional game, Adam has settled in the Sacramento region and runs Moffat Soccer Academy which focuses on private and small group football training.

== Honours ==
=== Individual ===
- Crew Comeback Player of the Year: 2009
- Dynamo Newcome of the Year: 2011
