= Luiz Camargo =

Brazilian footballer

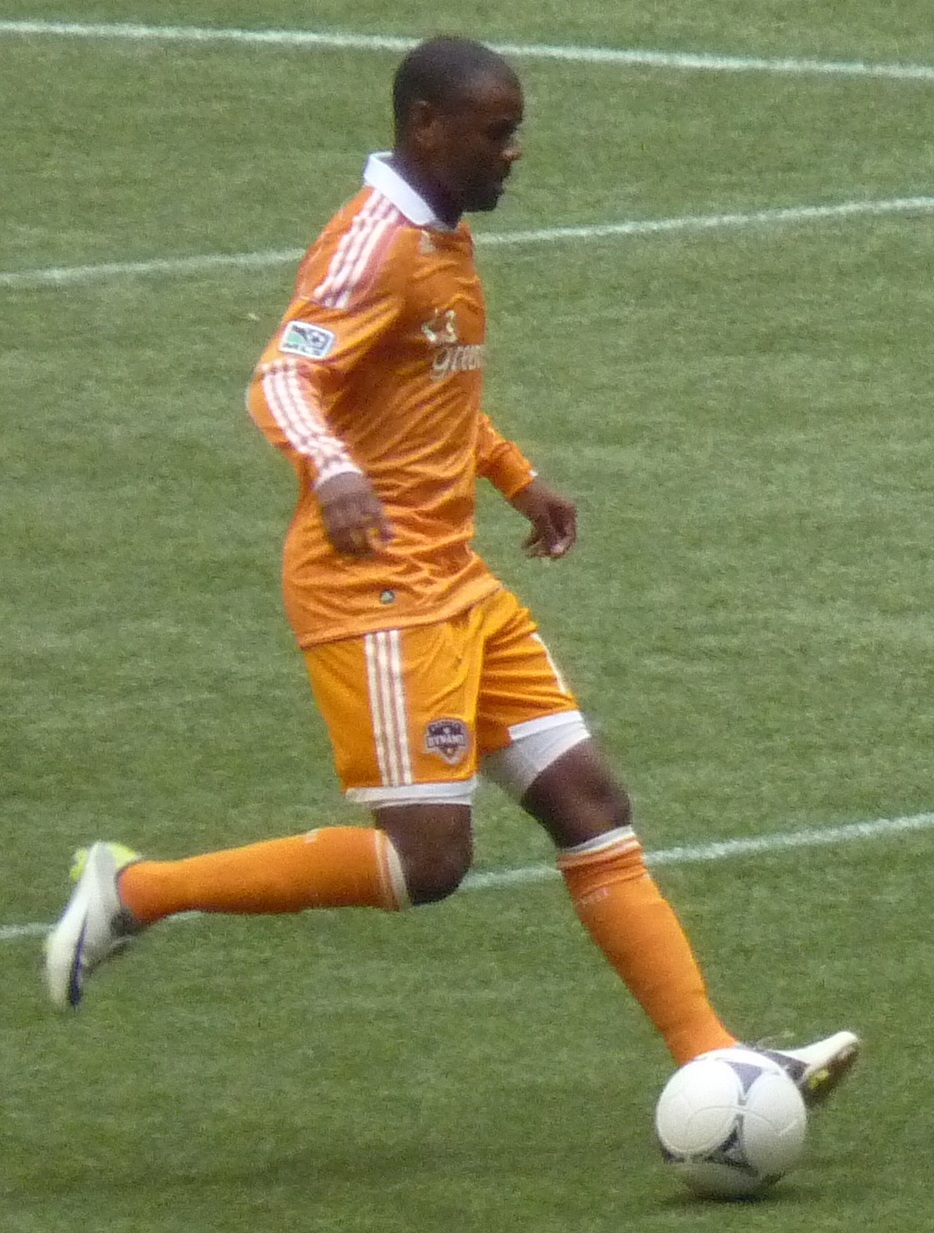
- Camargo playing for Houston Dynamo in 2012

Personal information
- Full name: Luiz Henrique Camargo
- Date of birth: 4 May 1987 (age 39)
- Place of birth: Vinhedo, Brazil
- Height: 1.77 m (5 ft 10 in)
- Position: Defensive midfielder

Senior career*
Years	Team	Apps	(Gls)
2009	Mogi Mirim	17	(1)
2009–2011	Paraná	64	(2)
2011	→ Houston Dynamo (loan)	7	(0)
2012–2013	Houston Dynamo	33	(1)
2014	J. Malucelli	8	(0)
- * Club domestic league appearances and goals as of 22 December 2014

Luiz Henrique Camargo (born 4 May 1987 in Vinhedo) is a Brazilian footballer.

== Club career ==
Luiz Camargo began his career in his native Brazil with Mogi Mirim. In 2009, he moved to Brazilian second division side Paraná, where he quickly established himself as a starter in central midfield for the club.

During the 2011 season, Camargo was sent on loan to Major League Soccer side Houston Dynamo. He joined a struggling Dynamo side during the latter part of the 2011 season. Camargo and his teammates' late-season performances led the club to a playoff berth and eventual place in the 2011 MLS Cup Final. At the conclusion of the season, Houston reached an agreement with Paraná to retain the Brazilian's services. Camargo played his first match of 2012 in a 1–0 reserve division win over the Colorado Rapids. In 2013 Camargo has scored 1 goal in three Dynamo reserve games showing confidence while controlling the flow of play for the dynamo on the field.

Camargo was waived by Houston on 26 June 2013.

== Personal life ==
On 15 March 2012, Camargo's wife gave birth to the couple's son named Pedro in Houston, Texas.
