= 2015 Houston Dynamo season =

Houston Dynamo
2015 season
- Owner: Philip Anschutz
- Head coach: Owen Coyle
- Stadium: BBVA Compass Stadium
- MLS: Conference: 8th Overall: 15th
- MLS Cup playoffs: Did not qualify
- U.S. Open Cup: Quarterfinals
- Top goalscorer: League: Will Bruin (11 goals); All: Will Bruin (12 goals)
- Highest home attendance: 22,651 (July 3 vs. Chicago)
- Lowest home attendance: League: 16,018 (May 5 vs. San Jose); All: 2,479 (June 30 vs. Colorado)
- Average home league attendance: Regular season: 20,618; Playoffs: — All: 17,725
Home colors	Away colors

The 2015 Houston Dynamo season was the club's tenth season of existence, and their first under new head coach Owen Coyle.

== Club ==
=== Roster ===
As of August 17, 2015.

No.	Position	Nation	Player
1	GK	USA	Tyler Deric
2	DF	USA	Kofi Sarkodie
3	MF	USA	Rob Lovejoy
4	DF	JAM	Jermaine Taylor
5	DF	ESP	Raúl Rodríguez
6	MF	USA	Nathan Sturgis
7	DF	USA	DaMarcus Beasley (DP)
8	MF	HON	Luis Garrido
9	FW	MEX	Erick Torres (DP)
10	FW	ENG	Giles Barnes
11	MF	USA	Brad Davis
12	FW	USA	Will Bruin
13	MF	USA	Ricardo Clark
14	MF	BRA	Alex
15	MF	HON	Alexander López
16	DF	USA	A. J. Cochran
17	FW	USA	Chandler Hoffman
18	DF	USA	David Horst
19	FW	COL	Mauro Manotas
20	MF	NGA	Rasheed Olabiyi
21	MF	USA	Zach Steinberger
22	DF	USA	Sheanon Williams
23	DF	USA	Taylor Hunter
27	MF	HON	Boniek Garcia
28	MF	USA	Memo Rodriguez (HGP)
30	GK	USA	Michael Lisch
31	GK	USA	Joe Willis
33	MF	ARG	Leonel Miranda

=== Transfers ===
==== In ====
Squad #	Position	Player	Transferred from	Date	Source
28	MF	(United States) Memo Rodriguez	(United States) Houston Dynamo Youth	December 4, 2014	
31	GK	(United States) Joe Willis	(United States) D.C. United	December 8, 2014	
	DF	(Ghana) Samuel Inkoom	(United States) D.C. United	December 8, 2014	
17	FW	(United States) Chandler Hoffman	(United States) LA Galaxy	December 18, 2014	
6	MF	(United States) Nathan Sturgis	(United States) Chivas USA	December 18, 2014	
9	FW	(Mexico) Erick Torres	(Mexico) C.D. Guadalajara	December 23, 2014	
5	DF	(Spain) Raúl Rodríguez	(Spain) RCD Espanyol	January 9, 2015	
21	MF	(United States) Zach Steinberger	(United States) Butler Bulldogs	January 15, 2015	
3	MF	(United States) Rob Lovejoy	(United States) North Carolina Tar Heels	January 15, 2015	
22	DF	(United States) Taylor Hunter	(United States) Denver Pioneers	January 20, 2015	
14	MF	(Brazil) Alex	(United States) Chicago Fire	April 13, 2015	
20	MF	(Nigeria) Rasheed Olabiyi	(Nigeria) Enyimba	July 9, 2015	
22	DF	(United States) Sheanon Williams	(United States) Philadelphia Union	July 23, 2015	
	MF	(United States) Christian Lucatero	(United States) Houston Dynamo Youth	August 18, 2015	

==== Out ====
Squad #	Position	Player	Transferred to	Date	Source
	DF	(United States) Eric Brunner	(United States) Retired		
	DF	(United States) Anthony Arena	(United States) Pittsburgh Riverhounds	November 25, 2014	
	FW	(Jamaica) Omar Cummings	(United States) San Antonio Scorpions	November 25, 2014	
	FW	(United States) Brian Ownby	(United States) Richmond Kickers	November 25, 2014	
	MF	(United States) Bryan Salazar		November 25, 2014	
	MF	(United States) Servando Carrasco	(United States) Sporting Kansas City	November 25, 2014	
	FW	(England) Andrew Driver	(United States) D.C. United	December 8, 2014	
	GK	(United States) Tally Hall	(United States) Orlando City SC	December 8, 2014	
	FW	(United States) Mark Sherrod	(United States) Orlando City SC	December 10, 2014	
	FW	(Jamaica) Jason Johnson	(United States) Chicago Fire	April 13, 2015	
	DF	(United States) Corey Ashe	(United States) Orlando City SC	July 15, 2015	

==== Loan in ====
Squad #	Position	Player	Loaned from	Date	Source
33	FW	(Argentina) Leonel Miranda	(Argentina) Independiente	January 8, 2015	

==== Loan out ====
Squad #	Position	Player	Loaned to	Date	Source
9	FW	(Mexico) Erick Torres	(Mexico) C.D. Guadalajara	December 23, 2014	
18	MF	(United States) Memo Rodriguez	(United States) Charleston Battery	March 20, 2015	
22	DF	(United States) Taylor Hunter	(United States) Colorado Springs Switchbacks	April 11, 2015	

== Competitions ==
=== Preseason ===
February 4, 2015 Desert Friendlies	Houston Dynamo	3–2	San Jose Earthquakes	Tucson, Arizona
11:00a.m. MST	Lovejoy 13'; Barnes 40'; Horst 53'	Report	Jahn 28', 57'; García (yellow card) 86'	Stadium: Kino Sports Complex; Referee: Ricardo Salazar

February 7, 2015 Desert Friendlies	Houston Dynamo	1–1	Portland Timbers	Tucson, Arizona
6:00P.m. MST	Davis (yellow card) 20'; Miranda 47'; Johnson (red card); Cochran (yellow card) 67'	Report	Cummings 69'; Paparatto (yellow card) 56'; Asprilla (yellow card) 63'	Stadium: Kino Sports Complex; Referee: Edwin Jurisevic

February 10, 2015 Desert Friendlies	Houston Dynamo	1–0	Vancouver Whitecaps FC	Tucson, Arizona
10:00a.m. MST	Rodríguez (yellow card) 17'; Horst (yellow card) 29'; Taylor 52'	Report		Stadium: Kino Sports Complex; Referee: Sorin Stoica

February 14, 2015 Scrimmage	Houston Dynamo	4–0	Dynamo Academy U-18	Houston, Texas
11:00a.m. CST	Hoffman 43', 53'; Cochran 47'; Johnson 50'	Report	Lucatero (yellow card) 43'; Martinez (yellow card) 43'	Stadium: Houston Methodist Champions Field at Houston Sports Park

February 18, 2015 Scrimmage	Houston Dynamo	0–1	Austin Aztex	Houston, Texas
1:00p.m. CST		Report	Rodríguez 86' (o.g.)	Stadium: Houston Methodist Champions Field at Houston Sports Park; Referee: Silviu Petrescu

February 21, 2015 2015 Carolina Challenge Cup	Charleston Battery	1–0	Houston Dynamo	Charleston, South Carolina
5:00p.m. EST	Savage 69'; Reimer (yellow card) 78'	Report	Garrido (yellow card) 40'; Steinberger (yellow card) 89'	Stadium: Blackbaud Stadium

February 25, 2015 2015 Carolina Challenge Cup	Houston Dynamo	2–1	New York City FC	Charleston, South Carolina
5:00p.m. EST	Garrido (yellow card) 30'; Davis 51'; García 70'; Steinberger (yellow card) 79'	Report	Shelton (yellow card) 53'; Hernandez (yellow card) 79'; Diskerud 81'	Stadium: Blackbaud Stadium; Referee: Hilario Grajeda

February 28, 2015 2015 Carolina Challenge Cup	Houston Dynamo	3–0	Orlando City SC	Charleston, South Carolina
5:00p.m. EST	Bruin 27'; Davis 30'; Miranda 45'; Miranda (yellow card) 60'	Report	Collin (red card); Shea (yellow card) 60'; Rivas (red card)	Stadium: Blackbaud Stadium

=== MLS ===
==== Schedule ====
March 7, 2015 1	Houston Dynamo	1–0	Columbus Crew SC	Houston, Texas
7:30p.m. CST	Barnes 66'	Report	Pogatetz (yellow card) 28'; Tchani (yellow card) 78'	Stadium: BBVA Compass Stadium; Attendance: 22,351 (Sellout); Referee: Allen Chapman

March 13, 2015 2	Houston Dynamo	0–1	Orlando City SC	Houston, Texas
6:00p.m. CST	Sarkodie (yellow card) 34'; Deric (yellow card) 75'	Report; Report	Okugo (yellow card) 46'; Deric 74' (o.g.)	Stadium: BBVA Compass Stadium; Attendance: 22,407; Referee: Chris Penso

March 21, 2015 3	LA Galaxy	1–1	Houston Dynamo	Carson, California
9:30p.m. CST	Keane 3'; Husidić (yellow card) 39'; Juninho (yellow card) 58'	Report; Report	Barnes (yellow card) 5'; Sturgis 11'; Garrido (yellow card) 38'; Sarkodie (yellow card) 77'	Stadium: StubHub Center; Attendance: 19,087; Referee: Juan Guzman

March 28, 2015 4	Houston Dynamo	0–0	Colorado Rapids	Houston, Texas
7:30p.m. CST	Clark (yellow card) 43'; López (yellow card) 68'; Sarkodie (yellow card) 84'	Report; Report	Watts (yellow card) 47'	Stadium: BBVA Compass Stadium; Attendance: 19,603; Referee: Marcos de Oliveira

April 4, 2015 5	Seattle Sounders FC	1–0	Houston Dynamo	Seattle, Washington
9:00p.m. CST	Rose (yellow card) 17'; Martins 39'; Pineda (red card) 56'	Report; Report	Garrido (yellow card) 38'; Clark (yellow card) 45+3'; Taylor (yellow card) 52'	Stadium: CenturyLink Field; Attendance: 39,860; Referee: Ted Unkel

April 11, 2015 6	Houston Dynamo	3–0	Montreal Impact	Houston, Texas
7:30p.m. CST	Barnes 15'; Taylor (yellow card) 67'; Clark 72'; Lovejoy 80'	Report; Report	Alexander (yellow card) 65'; Reo-Coker (yellow card) 90+2'	Stadium: BBVA Compass Stadium; Attendance: 18,924; Referee: Fotis Bazakos

April 18, 2015 7	D.C. United	1–1	Houston Dynamo	Washington, D.C.
6:00p.m. CST	Rolfe 36'; Kitchen (yellow card) 50'	Report; Report	Clark (yellow card) 9', (goal) 65'	Stadium: RFK Stadium; Attendance: 13,047; Referee: Jorge Gonzalez

April 25, 2015 8	Houston Dynamo	4–4	Sporting Kansas City	Houston, Texas
7:30p.m. CST	Barnes 11', 46'; Bruin 45+1', (yellow card) 63'; Taylor (red card) 77'; Rodriguez 83'	Report; Report	Nemeth 2'; Espinoza (yellow card) 31'; Anibaba (yellow card) 43'; Ellis (yellow card) 52'; Dwyer 74'; Feilhaber 80' (pen.), 90+5'	Stadium: BBVA Compass Stadium; Attendance: 21,046; Referee: Kevin Stott

May 1, 2015 9	Houston Dynamo	1–4	FC Dallas	Houston, Texas
7:00p.m. CST	Barnes 32'	Report	Hollingshead 9'; Texeira 21'; Hernandez (yellow card) 39'; Díaz 52'; Castillo 55'	Stadium: BBVA Compass Stadium; Attendance: 19,975

May 5, 2015 10	Houston Dynamo	0–1	San Jose Earthquakes	Houston, Texas
7:30p.m. CST	Clark (yellow card) 26'; Sarkodie (yellow card) 79'	Report	Jahn 54'; Stewart (yellow card) 75'	Stadium: BBVA Compass Stadium; Attendance: 16,018

May 10, 2015 11	Toronto FC	1–2	Houston Dynamo	Toronto, Ontario
4:00p.m. CST	Cheyrou (yellow card) 12'; Altidore 77'	Report	Taylor (yellow card) 41'; García 44'; Bruin 53'; Miranda (yellow card) 90+3'	Stadium: BMO Field; Attendance: 30,226

May 16, 2015 12	Houston Dynamo	3–1	Portland Timbers	Houston, Texas
7:30p.m. CST	Bruin 9', 83'; Barnes (yellow card) 45+1', (goal) 75'; Davis (yellow card) 90'	Report	Jewsbury (yellow card) 12'; Adi (yellow card) 14', (goal) 48'; Chará (yellow card) 42'; Powell (yellow card) 84'	Stadium: BBVA Compass Stadium; Attendance: 20,844

May 22, 2015 13	L.A. Galaxy	1–0	Houston Dynamo	Carson, California
	Ishizaki (yellow card) 24'; Juninho (yellow card) 58'; Gordon 90+1', (yellow card) 90+2'; Sorto (red card) 90+6'	Report	Rodríguez (yellow card) 42'; Barnes (yellow card) 82'	Stadium: StubHub Center; Attendance: 20,195; Referee: Ismail Elfath

May 30, 2015 14	New York City FC	1–1	Houston Dynamo	New York, New York
	Wingert (yellow card) 32'; Villa 45+1'; Hernandez (yellow card) 79'	Report	Bruin 16'; Clark (yellow card) 35'; Garrido (yellow card) 54'; Rodríguez (yellow card) 90+4'	Stadium: Yankee Stadium; Attendance: 26,211

June 5, 2015 15	Houston Dynamo	4–2	New York Red Bulls	Houston, Texas
	García 59'; Clark 72'; Bruin 80', 90+3'	Report	Duvall (yellow card) 27'; Grella 42', (yellow card) 62'; Abang 90'	Stadium: BBVA Compass Stadium; Attendance: 22,356

June 20, 2015 16	Portland Timbers	2–0	Houston Dynamo	Portland, Oregon
21:30	Urruti 34'; Chará (yellow card) 54'; Fernández 61' (pen.)	Report	Horst (yellow card) 59'; Garrido (yellow card) 69'	Stadium: Providence Park; Attendance: 21.144

June 26, 2015 17	FC Dallas	2–0	Houston Dynamo	Frisco, Texas
20:00	Taylor 37' (o.g.); Castillo 42'; Acosta (yellow card) 54'; Hedges (yellow card) 66'; Harris (yellow card) 68'	Report	Horst (yellow card) 42'; Barnes (yellow card) 42'; Taylor (yellow card) 77'	Stadium: Toyota Stadium; Attendance: 15,037

July 3, 2015 18	Houston Dynamo	1–1	Chicago Fire	Houston, Texas
20:00	Alex 56'; Rodríguez (yellow card) 66'	Report	Palmer (yellow card) 38'; Guly (yellow card) 40'; Nyarko 72' (yellow card) 86'	Stadium: BBVA Compass Stadium; Attendance: 22,651

July 10, 2015 19	San Jose Earthquakes	0–2	Houston Dynamo	San Jose, California
22:00		Report	Clark 10'; Bruin 81'; Deric (yellow card) 31'; Beasley (yellow card) 37'; Rodríguez (yellow card) 45+2'; Sturgis (yellow card) 45+3'	Stadium: Avaya Stadium; Attendance: 18,000; Referee: Sorin Stoica

July 18, 2015 20	Real Salt Lake	2–0	Houston Dynamo	Sandy, Utah
21:00				Stadium: Rio Tinto Stadium

July 25, 2015 22	Houston Dynamo	3–0	LA Galaxy	Houston, Texas
20:00				Stadium: BBVA Compass Stadium

August 1, 2015 22	Sporting Kansas City	1–1	Houston Dynamo	Kansas City, Kansas
19:30				Stadium: Sporting Park

August 8, 2015 23	Houston Dynamo	2–1	San Jose Earthquakes	Houston, Texas
20:00				Stadium: BBVA Compass Stadium

August 15, 2015 24	New England Revolution	2–0	Houston Dynamo	Foxborough, Massachusetts
18:30				Stadium: Gillette Stadium

August 21, 2015 25	Portland Timbers	2–2	Houston Dynamo	Portland, Oregon
22:00				Stadium: Providence Park

August 26, 2015 26	Colorado Rapids	2–1	Houston Dynamo	Commerce City, Colorado
20:00				Stadium: Dick's Sporting Goods Park

August 29, 2015 27	Houston Dynamo	2–0	Vancouver Whitecaps FC	Houston, Texas
20:00				Stadium: BBVA Compass Stadium

September 12, 2015 28	Houston Dynamo	1–3	Real Salt Lake	Houston, Texas
19:30				Stadium: BBVA Compass Stadium

September 20, 2015 29	Philadelphia Union	2–0	Houston Dynamo	Chester, Pennsylvania
18:00				Stadium: PPL Park

September 23, 2015 30	Houston Dynamo	1–0	Sporting Kansas City	Houston, Texas
19:30				Stadium: BBVA Compass Stadium

September 26, 2015 31	Houston Dynamo	3–2	Colorado Rapids	Houston, Texas
19:30				Stadium: BBVA Compass Stadium

October 4, 2015 32	FC Dallas	4–1	Houston Dynamo	Frisco, Texas
16:00				Stadium: Toyota Stadium

October 18, 2015 33	Houston Dynamo	1–1	Seattle Sounders FC	Houston, Texas
16:00				Stadium: BBVA Compass Stadium

October 25, 2015 34	Vancouver Whitecaps FC	3–0	Houston Dynamo	Vancouver, British Columbia
18:00				Stadium: BC Place

==== Standings ====
===== Western Conference Table =====
Pos	Team	Pld	W	L	T	GF	GA	GD	Pts	Qualification
6	Sporting Kansas City	34	14	11	9	48	45	+3	51	MLS Cup Knockout Round
7	San Jose Earthquakes	34	13	13	8	41	39	+2	47	
8	Houston Dynamo	34	11	14	9	42	49	−7	42	
9	Real Salt Lake	34	11	15	8	38	48	−10	41	
10	Colorado Rapids	34	9	15	10	33	43	−10	37	

Source: MLS

===== Overall Table =====
Pos	Team	Pld	W	L	T	GF	GA	GD	Pts
13	San Jose Earthquakes	34	13	13	8	41	39	+2	47
14	Orlando City SC	34	12	14	8	46	56	−10	44
15	Houston Dynamo	34	11	14	9	42	49	−7	42
16	Real Salt Lake	34	11	15	8	38	48	−10	41
17	New York City FC	34	10	17	7	49	58	−9	37

Source: MLS
Rules for classification: 1) points; 2) total wins; 3) total goal differential; 4) total goals scored

=== U.S. Open Cup ===
Houston will enter the 2015 U.S. Open Cup with the rest of Major League Soccer in the fourth round.

June 17, 2015 4R	Houston Dynamo	2–0	Austin Aztex	Houston, Texas
8:00 PM CDT	Miranda 24'; Ashe (yellow card) 36'; Sturgis (yellow card) 48'; Steinberger (yellow card) 68'; Clark 90+2'	Houston Report; MLS Report	Timbó (yellow card) 59'; Ambrose (yellow card) 73'	Stadium: BBVA Compass Stadium; Attendance: 4,041; Referee: Luis Guardia

June 30, 2015 5R	Houston Dynamo	1–0	Colorado Rapids	Houston, Texas
20:00 CDT	Sturgis (yellow card) 11'; Manotas 43'	Report	Hairston (yellow card) 26'; O'Neill (yellow card) 55'	Stadium: BBVA Compass Stadium; Attendance: 2,479; Referee: Nima Saghafi

July 21, 2015 QF	Sporting Kansas City	3–1	Houston Dynamo	Kansas City, Kansas
19:30 CDT	Mustivar (yellow card) 34'; Espinoza (yellow card) 68'; Feilhaber 71'; Dwyer 86'; Németh 88'	Report	Garrido (red card) 30'; Clark (yellow card) 57'; Bruin 59'; Davis (yellow card) 68'; Miranda (yellow card) 75'	Stadium: Sporting Park; Attendance: 17,589; Referee: Ted Unkel

=== Friendlies ===
May 28, 2015 BBVA Compass Dynamo Charities Cup	Houston Dynamo (United States)	Canceled	(England) Manchester City F.C.	Houston, Texas
MST		Report		Stadium: BBVA Compass Stadium
Note: Playing surface deemed unsafe after recent flooding.

== Statistical Leaders ==
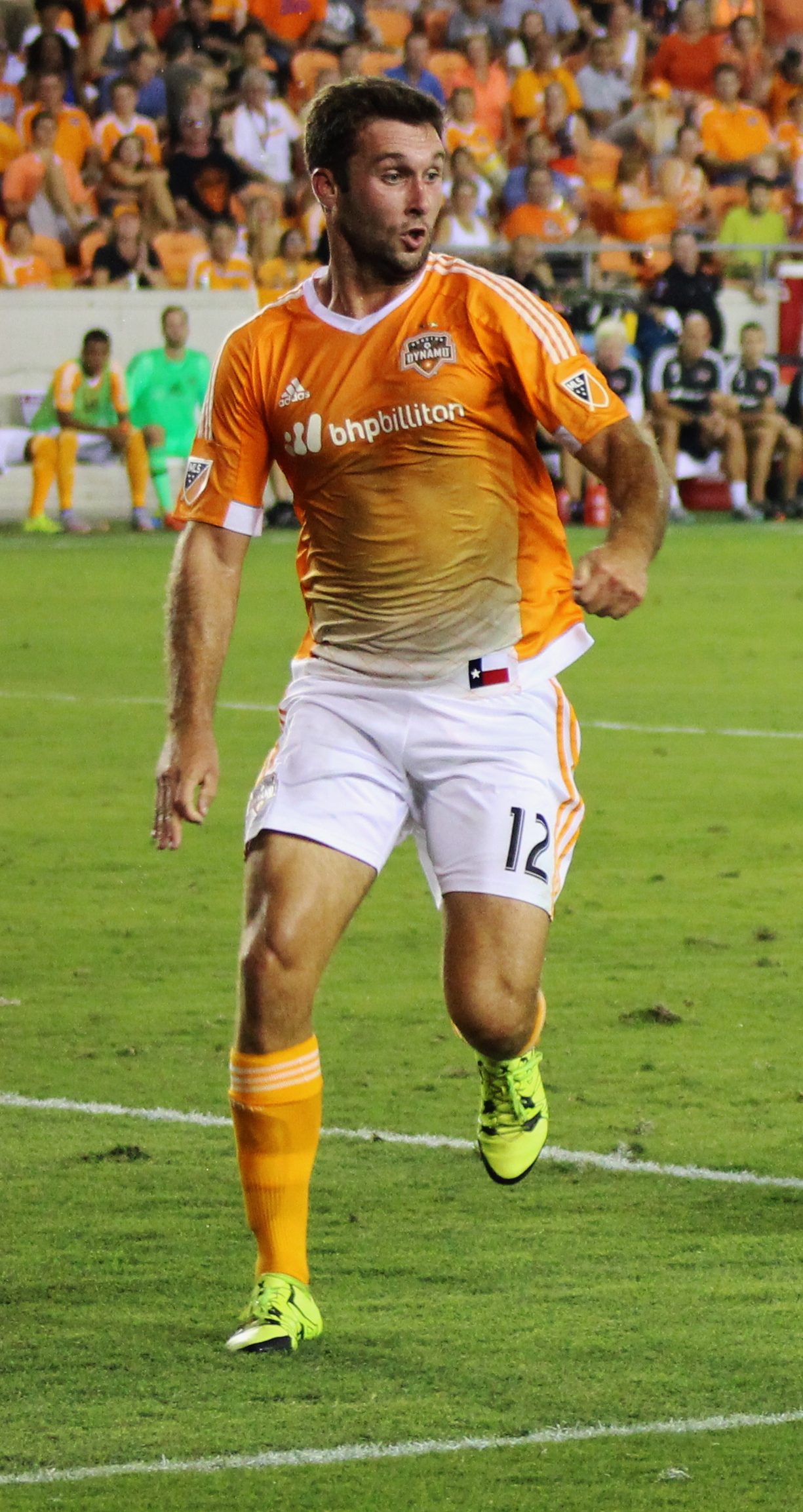
Will Bruin led the Dynamo in scoring in 2015

Goals
	Name	#
1	(United States) Will Bruin	11
2	(United States) Ricardo Clark	8
3	(Jamaica) Giles Barnes	7
4	(United States) Brad Davis	4
5	(Honduras) Boniek Garcia	3

Assists
	Name	#
1	(United States) Brad Davis	10
2	(Honduras) Boniek Garcia	5
3	(United States) Will Bruin	4
4	(Honduras) Alexander Lopez	3
4	(Jamaica) Giles Barnes	3

Appearances (starts)
	Name	#
1	(United States) Will Bruin	33 (28)
2	(United States) David Horst	32 (28)
3	(United States) Ricardo Clark	30 (30)
4	(United States) Brad Davis	30 (29)
5	(Honduras) Luis Garido	29 (21)

== Uniforms ==
Home	Home Alt.	Away

== Television ==
For the 2015 season, Root Sports Southwest serves as the English broadcaster of all 22 non-national Major League Soccer matches. The one-year deal with ROOT SPORTS' regional network includes a 30-minute pregame and postgame show for each game. Games and weekly programing had aired the previous two seasons on Comcast SportsNet Houston, which was purchased out of bankruptcy court by DirecTV and AT&T in October 2014 and rebranded as Root Sports Southwest.

Root Sports initially cancelled the three-year deal signed in 2013 with CSN Houston before agreeing on this new deal with the Dynamo. In comparison, the Dynamo lose airtime by way of a weekly show and daily coverage on CSN's daily newscast but gained a higher distribution to homes in Houston that weren't subscribed to Comcast and therefore did not have access to Comcast's exclusive sports network.

On the Spanish side, Telemundo Houston returns as the Dynamo's broadcast partner for the second consecutive season. The Telemundo-owned Houston station signed up for 10 Dynamo games in 2015, a three-game increase from the 2014 season. Five of those matches will air live on TeleXitos, available over-the-air on KTMD's secondary channel 47.2, and select games on TeleXitos include a 30-minute pregame and a 30-minute postgame show. Games on Telemundo, channel 47.1, air deferred at 11 p.m. on the night of the match due to scheduling conflicts with national programming (of which includes Telemundo's home games telecast of Liga MX sides León and Pachuca).

The remaining 12 games of the regular-season will be carried by MLS' national TV partners, including 8 on the Univision family of networks, which shows the Dynamo's appeal to a national Hispanic audience due to its Honduran trio (Boniek, Garrido and López) and the addition of Mexican international Erick Torres.

== See also ==
- Houston Dynamo
- 2015 in American soccer
- 2015 Major League Soccer season
