= 2016 Houston Dynamo season =

Houston Dynamo
2016 season
- Owner: Gabriel Brener
- President: Chris Canetti
- Coach: Owen Coyle (until May 25, 2016); Wade Barrett (until October 28, 2016); Wilmer Cabrera (from October 28, 2016)
- Stadium: BBVA Compass Stadium
- MLS: Conference: 10th Overall: 19th
- MLS Cup playoffs: Did not qualify
- U.S. Open Cup: Quarterfinals
- Top goalscorer: League: Andrew Wenger; Mauro Manotas (6 each); All: Mauro Manotas (9 goals)
- Highest home attendance: 21,601 (vs. FC Dallas – March 12)
- Lowest home attendance: 5,807 (vs. San Antonio FC – June 15)
- Average home league attendance: 19,021
Home colors	Away colors

The 2016 Houston Dynamo season was the club's 11th season of existence since joining Major League Soccer for the 2006 season.

The Dynamo entered the 2016 Major League Soccer season looking to return to the MLS Cup Playoffs after failing to qualify the previous two seasons but instead missed the playoffs for the third consecutive year, a club record, and finished in last place in the Western Conference.

The season covers the period from December 7, 2015 to December 10, 2016, the day of MLS Cup 2016. This was Houston's fifth season at BBVA Compass Stadium, after opening the stadium in 2012.

== Club ==
=== Coaching staff ===
==== Until May 25, 2016 ====
Position	Staff
Head Coach	(Scotland) Owen Coyle
Assistant coach	(Scotland) Sandy Stewart
Assistant coach	(United States) Wade Barrett
Goalkeeper coach	(England) Paul Rogers
Sports Performance Director/Fitness Coach	(Republic of Ireland) Paul Caffrey
Performance Analyst	(England) Oliver Gage
General Manager/Vice President	(United States) Matt Jordan
Assistant General Manager/Director of Soccer Operations	(United States) Nick Kowba
Equipment Manager	Chris Maxwell
Asst. Equipment Manager	Eddie Cerda
Director of Sports Medicine/Head Athletic Trainer	(United States) Theron Enns
Assistant Athletic Trainer	(United States) Rory Blevins
Head Team Physician	(United States) Timothy C. Sitter, MD
Primary Care Physician	(United States) David A. Braunreiter, MD
Director, Youth Development/Academy Director	(England) James Clarkson
Soccer Programs Manager	(England) Adrian Moses
Center of Excellence Manager	(United States) Justin Neese

==== From June 7, 2016 to October 28, 2016 ====
Position	Staff
Interim Head Coach	(United States) Wade Barrett
Goalkeeper coach	(England) Paul Rogers
Sports Performance Director/Fitness Coach	(Republic of Ireland) Paul Caffrey
Performance Analyst	(England) Oliver Gage
General Manager/Vice President	(United States) Matt Jordan
Assistant General Manager/Director of Soccer Operations	(United States) Nick Kowba
Equipment Manager	Chris Maxwell
Asst. Equipment Manager	Eddie Cerda
Director of Sports Medicine/Head Athletic Trainer	(United States) Theron Enns
Assistant Athletic Trainer	(United States) Rory Blevins
Head Team Physician	(United States) Timothy C. Sitter, MD
Primary Care Physician	(United States) David A. Braunreiter, MD
Director, Youth Development/Academy Director	(England) James Clarkson
Soccer Programs Manager	(England) Adrian Moses
Center of Excellence Manager	(United States) Justin Neese

==== From October 28, 2016 ====
Position	Staff
Head Coach	(Colombia) Wilmer Cabrera
Assistant coach	(United States) Davy Arnaud
Assistant coach	(United States) Michael Dellorusso
Goalkeeper coach	(England) Paul Rogers
Sports Performance Director/Fitness Coach	(Republic of Ireland) Paul Caffrey
Performance Analyst	(England) Oliver Gage
General Manager/Vice President	(United States) Matt Jordan
Assistant General Manager/Director of Soccer Operations	(United States) Nick Kowba
Equipment Manager	Chris Maxwell
Asst. Equipment Manager	Eddie Cerda
Director of Sports Medicine/Head Athletic Trainer	(United States) Theron Enns
Assistant Athletic Trainer	(United States) Rory Blevins
Head Team Physician	(United States) Timothy C. Sitter, MD
Primary Care Physician	(United States) David A. Braunreiter, MD
Director, Youth Development/Academy Director	(England) James Clarkson
Soccer Programs Manager	(England) Adrian Moses
Center of Excellence Manager	(United States) Justin Neese

=== Other information ===
Owner	(Mexico) Gabriel Brener
Co-Owners	(United States) Oscar De La Hoya (United States) Ben Guill (United States) Jake Silverstein
President of Business Operations	(United States) Chris Canetti
Executive Vice President/Chief Revenue Officer	(England) Steven Powell
Senior Vice President/Chief Operating Officer	(United States) David Tagliarino
Vice President/Chief Marketing Officer	(United States) Amber Cox
Ground (capacity and dimensions)	BBVA Compass Stadium (22,039 / 115x70 yards)
Training ground	Houston Sports Park

Updated to match played July 24, 2016
Source: Houston Dynamo

== Roster ==
As of match plated October 23, 2016

No.	Name	Nationality	Position	Date of birth (Age (Note: Age as of the end of the season))	Signed from	Signed in	Contract ends	Apps.	Goals
Goalkeepers
1	Tyler Deric (HGP)	(United States)	GK	30 August 1983 (aged 33)	North Carolina Tar Heels	2009		69	0
24	Calle Brown	(United States)	GK	1 July 1992 (aged 24)	Pittsburgh Riverhounds	2016		0	0
31	Joe Willis	(United States)	GK	10 August 1988 (aged 28)	D.C. United	2015		35	0
Defenders
2	Jalil Anibaba	(United States)	DF	19 October 1988 (aged 28)	Sporting Kansas City	2016		40	0
4	Agus	(Spain)	DF	3 May 1985 (aged 31)	Albacete	2016		11	0
5	Raúl Rodríguez	(Spain)	DF	22 September 1987 (aged 29)	RCD Espanyol	2015		55	4
18	David Horst	(United States)	DF	25 October 1985 (aged 30)	Portland Timbers	2014		93	4
20	Abdoulie Mansally	(The Gambia)	DF	27 January 1989 (aged 27)	Real Salt Lake	2016		11	0
22	Sheanon Williams	(United States)	DF	17 March 1990 (aged 26)	Philadelphia Union	2015		38	0
30	Keyner Brown	(Costa Rica)	DF	30 December 1991 (aged 24)	loan from Herediano	2016		4	0
34	Sebastien Ibeagha	(United States)	DF	21 January 1992 (aged 24)	AC Horsens	2016		0	0
Midfielders
3	Rob Lovejoy	(United States)	MF	14 April 1991 (aged 25)	Carolina Dynamo	2015		20	1
6	Eric Alexander	(United States)	MF	14 April 1988 (aged 28)	Montreal Impact	2016		10	0
7	DaMarcus Beasley	(United States)	MF	25 May 1982 (aged 34)	Puebla	2014		63	2
8	Cristian Maidana	(Argentina)	MF	24 January 1987 (aged 29)	Philadelphia Union	2016		33	3
13	Ricardo Clark	(United States)	MF	10 February 1983 (aged 33)	Eintracht Frankfurt	2012		114	23
14	Alex	(Brazil)	MF	15 December 1988 (aged 27)	Chicago Fire	2015		50	9
21	Zach Steinberger	(United States)	MF	10 May 1992 (aged 24)	Butler Bulldogs	2015		7	0
23	José Escalante	(Honduras)	MF	29 May 1995 (aged 21)	loan from Olimpia	2016		3	0
26	Collen Warner	(United States)	MF	24 June 1988 (aged 28)	Toronto	2016		26	0
27	Boniek García	(Honduras)	MF	4 September 1984 (aged 32)	Olimpia	2012		141	15
28	Yair Arboleda	(Colombia)	MF	7 April 1996 (aged 20)	loan from Santa Fe	2016		1	0
29	Christian Lucatero	(United States)	MF	4 September 1984 (aged 32)	Academy	2016		0	0
Forwards
9	Erick Torres Padilla	(Mexico)	ST	19 January 1993 (aged 23)	Guadalajara	2015		23	0
11	Andrew Wenger	(United States)	ST	25 December 1990 (aged 25)	Philadelphia Union	2016		34	6
12	Will Bruin	(United States)	ST	24 October 1989 (aged 26)	Indiana Hoosiers	2011		202	57
19	Mauro Manotas	(Colombia)	ST	15 July 1995 (aged 21)	Uniautónoma	2015		37	10
Players eligible from Rio Grande Valley
32	T. J. Casner	(United States)	ST	28 September 1994 (aged 22)	Clemson Tigers	2016		1	0
Left during the season
6	David Rocha	(Spain)	MF	7 February 1985 (aged 31)	Gimnàstic	2016		6	0
10	Giles Barnes	(Jamaica)	ST	5 September 1988 (aged 28)	Doncaster Rovers	2012		132	34
33	Leonel Miranda	(Argentina)	MF	7 January 1994 (aged 22)	loan from Independiente	2015		37	5

== Transfers ==
For transfers in, dates listed are when Houston Dynamo officially signed the players to the roster. Transactions where only the rights to the players are acquired are not listed. For transfers out, dates listed are when Houston Dynamo officially removed the players from its roster, not when they signed with another club. If a player later signed with another club, his new club will be noted, but the date listed here remains the one when he was officially removed from Houston Dynamo roster.

=== In ===
No.	Pos.	Player	Transferred from	Fee/notes	Date	Source
8	MF	(Argentina) Cristian Maidana	(United States) Philadelphia Union	Trade	December 7, 2015	
11	MF	(United States) Andrew Wenger	(United States) Philadelphia Union	Trade	December 7, 2015	
24	GK	(United States) Calle Brown	(United States) Pittsburgh Riverhounds	Free	December 17, 2015	
30	DF	(United States) Bradley Bourgeois	(United States) Houston Dynamo Academy	Signed HGP deal	December 23, 2015	
2	DF	(United States) Jalil Anibaba	(United States) Sporting Kansas City	Free	January 11, 2016	
34	DF	(United States) Sebastien Ibeagha	(Denmark) AC Horsens	Free	January 26, 2016	
6	MF	(Spain) David Rocha	(Spain) Gimnàstic	Free	January 27, 2016	
4	DF	(Spain) Agus	(Spain) Albacete	Free	January 27, 2016	
33	MF	(Argentina) Leonel Miranda	(Argentina) Independiente	Loan	January 30, 2016	
20	DF	(The Gambia) Abdoulie Mansally	(United States) Real Salt Lake	Trade	February 18, 2016	
26	MF	(United States) Collen Warner	(Canada) Toronto FC	Trade	March 2, 2016	
6	MF	(United States) Eric Alexander	(Canada) Montreal Impact	Trade	July 22, 2016	
28	MF	(Colombia) Yair Arboleda	(Colombia) Independiente Santa Fe	Loan	July 29, 2016	
23	FW	(Honduras) José Escalante	(United States) RGVFC Toros	Loan	August 3, 2016	
30	DF	(Costa Rica) Keyner Brown	(Costa Rica) Herediano	Loan	August 3, 2016	

==== Draft picks ====
Draft picks are not automatically signed to the team roster. Only those who are signed to a contract will be listed as transfers in. Only trades involving draft picks and executed after the start of 2015 MLS SuperDraft will be listed in the notes.

Date	Player	Number	Position	Previous club	Notes	Ref
January 14, 2016	(Brazil) Ivan Magalhães		DF	(United States) Maryland Terrapins	MLS SuperDraft 2nd Round Pick (#26). Signed to USL hybrid-affiliate RGVFC.	
January 19, 2016	(United States) T. J. Casner		FW	(United States) Clemson Tigers	MLS SuperDraft 3rd Round Pick (#47). Signed to USL hybrid-affiliate RGVFC.	

=== Out ===
No.	Pos.	Player	Transferred to	Fee/notes	Date	Source
30	GK	(United States) Michael Lisch		Contract option declined	November 30, 2015	
16	DF	(United States) A. J. Cochran	(United States) Saint Louis FC	Contract option declined, Signed with St. Louis on March 6, 2016	November 30, 2015	
4	DF	(Jamaica) Jermaine Taylor	(United States) Portland Timbers	Contract option declined, Second pick in Stage Two of the 2015 MLS Re-Entry Draft on December 17, 2015	November 30, 2015	
8	MF	(Honduras) Luis Garrido	(Honduras) Olimpia	Contract option declined, Loan expired	November 30, 2015	
15	MF	(Honduras) Alexander López	(Honduras) Olimpia	Contract option declined	November 30, 2015	
6	MF	(United States) Nathan Sturgis	(United States) Seattle Sounders FC	Contract option declined, signed with Seattle on a free transfer on February 23, 2016	November 30, 2015	
17	FW	(United States) Chandler Hoffman	(United States) Louisville City FC	Contract option declined, Signed with Louisville City on December 28, 2015	November 30, 2015	
11	MF	(United States) Brad Davis	(United States) Sporting Kansas City	Trade	January 7, 2016	
28	MF	(United States) Memo Rodriguez	(United States) Rio Grande Valley FC Toros	Waived	February 26, 2016	
23	DF	(United States) Taylor Hunter	(United States) Rio Grande Valley FC Toros	Waived	February 26, 2016	
20	MF	(Nigeria) Rasheed Olabiyi		Waived	February 29, 2016	
21	MF	(United States) Zach Steinberger	(United States) Jacksonville Armada	Out on Loan	June 29, 2016	
6	MF	(Spain) David Rocha	(Spain) Real Oviedo	Mutual termination	July 6, 2016	
33	MF	(Argentina) Leonel Miranda	(Argentina) Independiente	Loan expired	July 6, 2016	
34	DF	(United States) Sebastien Ibeagha	(United States) Rayo OKC	Out on Loan	July 12, 2016	
10	FW	(Jamaica) Giles Barnes	(Canada) Vancouver Whitecaps FC	Trade	July 30, 2016	
9	FW	(Mexico) Erick Torres	(Mexico) Cruz Azul	Out on Loan	September 3, 2016	

== Friendlies ==
February 3, 2016 Desert Friendlies	Houston Dynamo	1–1	Portland Timbers	Tucson
19:00 CDT	Manotas 74'	Report	Asprilla 38'	Stadium: Kino Sports Complex

February 6, 2016 Desert Friendlies	Houston Dynamo	1–0	San Jose Earthquakes	Tucson
18:00 CDT	Torres 47' (pen.)	Report		Stadium: Kino Sports Complex

February 9, 2016 Desert Friendlies	Vancouver Whitecaps FC	2–0	Houston Dynamo	Tucson
19:00 CDT	Bustos 98'; Ibeagha 120' (o.g.)	Report		Stadium: Kino Sports Complex
Note: Four thirty minute periods

February 13, 2016	Houston Baptist Huskies	0–5	Houston Dynamo	Houston
11:00 EDT		Report	Manotas 34', 43'; Torres 38'; Bruin 49'; Maidana 51'	Stadium: Methodist Champions Field

February 16, 2016	Houston Dynamo	3–1	Dynamo Academy U-18s	Houston
19:00 EDT	Maidana 5' (pen.); Manotas 33', 42'	Report	Ouattara 85'	Stadium: Methodist Champions Field

March 15, 2016 Scrimmage	Houston Dynamo	2–1	Rio Grande Valley	Houston
11:00 CT	Lovejoy 37'; Torres	Report	Catic 43'	Stadium: Houston Sports Park

May 24, 2016 Dynamo Charities Cup	Houston Dynamo	3–3 (5–4 p)	Real Sociedad	Houston
6:15 p.m. CT	Rocha 22'; González 31' (o.g.); Manotas 49'; Agus (yellow card) 84'; Williams (yellow card) 90'	Report	Prieto 55'; Bautista 59'; Pardo 73'	Stadium: BBVA Compass Stadium; Attendance: 13,675; Referee: Les Stalmach
	Penalties
	Maidana (penalty scored); Rocha (penalty scored); Agus (penalty scored); Williams (penalty scored); Bruin (penalty scored)		(penalty scored) Pardo; (penalty missed) Prieto; (penalty scored) Illarramendi; (penalty scored) Zurutuza; (penalty scored) Rulli

September 4, 2016	Houston Dynamo	0–0	Guadalajara	Houston
19:00 CT		Report	Escalante (yellow card) 31'; Williams (yellow card) 35'; Rodríguez (yellow card) 38'	Stadium: BBVA Compass Stadium; Attendance: 14,872; Referee: Ricardo Salazar

=== Desert Diamond Cup ===
February 20, 2016	Houston Dynamo	0–0	Colorado Rapids	Tucson
20:00 EDT		Report		Stadium: Kino Sports Complex

February 24, 2016	Houston Dynamo	1–2	New England Revolution	Tucson
18:30 EDT	Agus (yellow card) 61'; Torres 67'; Rocha (yellow card) 82'	Report	Bunbury 48'; Neumann 69'; Herivaux (yellow card) 73'; Gamble (yellow card) 87'	Stadium: Kino Sports Complex

February 27, 2016	Houston Dynamo	2–2	Sporting Kansas City	Tucson
EDT	Barnes 31'; Torres 77'	Report	Coelho 16'; Sallói 55'	Stadium: Kino Sports Complex

== Competitions ==
=== Major League Soccer ===
==== Conference Table ====
Pos	Team	Pld	W	L	T	GF	GA	GD	Pts	Qualification
1	FC Dallas	34	17	8	9	50	40	+10	60	Qualification for the conference semifinals
2	Colorado Rapids	34	15	6	13	39	32	+7	58	Qualification for the conference semifinals
3	LA Galaxy	34	12	6	16	54	39	+15	52	Qualification for the knockout round
4	Seattle Sounders FC	34	14	14	6	44	43	+1	48	Qualification for the knockout round
5	Sporting Kansas City	34	13	13	8	42	41	+1	47	Qualification for the knockout round
6	Real Salt Lake	34	12	12	10	44	46	−2	46	Qualification for the knockout round
7	Portland Timbers	34	12	14	8	48	53	−5	44	
8	Vancouver Whitecaps FC	34	10	15	9	45	52	−7	39	
9	San Jose Earthquakes	34	8	12	14	32	40	−8	38	
10	Houston Dynamo	34	7	14	13	39	45	−6	34	

Source: MLS

==== Matches ====
March 6, 2016 1	Houston Dynamo	3–3	New England Revolution	Houston
13:45 CT	Maidana 45+1'; Wenger 50'; Anibaba (yellow card) 55'; Barnes 77'	Report	Fagúndez 3'; Bunbury (yellow card) 27'; Watson (yellow card) 49'; Davies 52'; Kobayashi 90+3'	Stadium: BBVA Compass Stadium; Attendance: 21,594; Referee: Jose Rivero

March 12, 2016 2	Houston Dynamo	5–0	Dallas	Houston
19:15 CT	Horst 6'; Hedges 13' (o.g.); Clark 23'; Wenger 27' (yellow card) 34'; Rodríguez (yellow card) 32'; Bruin 85'; García (yellow card) 80'	Report	Harris (yellow card) 21'; Gruezo (yellow card) 33'; Figueroa (yellow card) 43'	Stadium: BBVA Compass Stadium; Attendance: 21,601; Referee: Jorge Gonzalez

March 19, 2016 3	New York Red Bulls	4–3	Houston Dynamo	Harrison
18:00 CT	Kljestan 22'; Felipe (yellow card) 62' (goal) 77', 83'; Grella 63'	Report	Bruin 35', 41'; Horst (yellow card) 50'; Alex 65'	Stadium: Red Bull Arena; Attendance: 15,167; Referee: Jair Marrufo

March 26, 2016 4	Vancouver Whitecaps FC	1–0	Houston Dynamo	Vancouver
21:00 CT	Morales 23' (pen.); Laba (yellow card) 77'; Kah (yellow card) 90+2'	Report		Stadium: BC Place; Attendance: 22,120; Referee: David Gantar

April 10, 2016 5	Houston Dynamo	1–1	Seattle Sounders FC	Houston
14:45 CT	Barnes 35'; Anibaba (yellow card) 41'	Report	Jones (yellow card) 55'; Marshall 90+4'	Stadium: BBVA Compass Stadium; Attendance: 20,975; Referee: Ismail Elfath

April 15, 2016 6	Houston Dynamo	1–4	LA Galaxy	Houston
17:45 CT	Horst 1'	Report	dos Santos 4', 31'; Husidić 21'; Zardes 49'; Cole (yellow card) 56'; Steres (yellow card) 90'	Stadium: BBVA Compass Stadium; Attendance: 20,563; Referee: Mark Geiger

April 23, 2016 7	Columbus Crew SC	1–0	Houston Dynamo	Columbus
18:30 CT	Kamara 21' (pen.); Meram (yellow card) 24'; Wahl (yellow card) 27'	Report	Deric (red card) 18'	Stadium: Mapfre Stadium; Attendance: 17,705; Referee: Kevin Stott

April 30, 2016 8	Real Salt Lake	2–1	Houston Dynamo	Sandy
20:30 CT	Allen 62'; Movsisyan 70'	Report	Beasley (yellow card) 3'; Clark (yellow card) 24'; Miranda 54'	Stadium: Rio Tinto Stadium; Attendance: 19,950; Referee: Nima Saghafi

May 7, 2016 9	Houston Dynamo	2–0	Sporting Kansas City	Houston
19:30 CT	Alex (yellow card) 29'; Barnes 30'; Wenger 45+1'; Anibaba (yellow card) 53'; Clark (yellow card) 90+5'	Report	Myers (yellow card) 45+1'; Espinoza (yellow card) 62'	Stadium: BBVA Compass Stadium; Attendance: 20,071; Referee: Drew Fischer

May 11, 2016 10	San Jose Earthquakes	3–1	Houston Dynamo	San Jose
21:30 CT	Quintero 3', 70'; Godoy 50'; Wynne (yellow card) 73'	Report	Alex (yellow card) 21'; Clark 43'; Deric (red card) 79'	Stadium: Avaya Stadium; Attendance: 18,000; Referee: Jaime Herrera

May 14, 2016 11	Houston Dynamo	1–0	Real Salt Lake	Houston
19:15 CT	Alex (yellow card) 31'; Barnes 65'	Report	Beltran (yellow card) 81'	Stadium: BBVA Compass Stadium; Attendance: 17,943; Referee: Juan Guzman

May 21, 2016 12	Chicago Fire	1–0	Houston Dynamo	Bridgeview
16:00 CT	Álvarez 3'; Igboananike (yellow card) 56'; Polster (yellow card) 76'	Report	Horst (yellow card) 23'	Stadium: Toyota Park; Attendance: 15,363; Referee: Allen Chapman

May 28, 2016 13	Vancouver Whitecaps FC	1–1	Houston Dynamo	Vancouver, British Columbia
17:00 CT	Smith (yellow card) 22'; Teibert (yellow card) 40'; Morales (red card) 42'; Rivero 52'; Laba (yellow card) 67'	Report	Beasley 20'; Alex (red card) 42'; García (yellow card) 51'; Wenger (yellow card) 69'	Stadium: BC Place; Attendance: 22,120; Referee: Drew Fischer

June 2, 2016 14	FC Dallas	1–1	Houston Dynamo	Frisco
20:00 CT	Hollingshead 23' (yellow card) 67'	Report	Clark 51'	Stadium: Toyota Stadium; Attendance: 13,457; Referee: Kevin Stott

June 18, 2016 15	Houston Dynamo	0–0	D.C. United	Houston
19:45 CT	Rodríguez (yellow card) 42'	Report	DeLeon (yellow card) 9'; Boswell (yellow card) 28'; Jeffrey (yellow card) 87'	Stadium: BBVA Compass Stadium; Attendance: 19,774; Referee: Allen Chapman

June 26, 2016 16	Portland Timbers	3–2	Houston Dynamo	Portland
17:00 CT	Melano 64'; Valeri 82' (pen.), 90+1' (pen.); Adi (yellow card) 90+4'	Report	Wenger 28'; Bruin 30'; Horst (yellow card) 43'; Alex (yellow card) 90+1'	Stadium: Providence Park; Attendance: 21,144; Referee: Hilario Grajeda

July 2, 2016 17	Houston Dynamo	1–0	Philadelphia Union	Houston
19:45 CT	Maidana 90+5'	Report	Yaro (yellow card) 2' (yellow-red card) 87'; Creavalle (yellow card) 90+4'	Stadium: BBVA Compass Stadium; Attendance: 18,457; Referee: Edvin Jurisevic

July 8, 2016 18	Orlando City SC	0–0	Houston Dynamo	Orlando
19:00 CT		Report		Stadium: Camping World Stadium; Attendance: 28,104; Referee: Fotis Bazakos

July 15, 2016 19	LA Galaxy	1-0	Houston Dynamo	Carson
22:00 CT	dos Santos (yellow card) 55'; Larentowicz (yellow card) 64'; Gerrard 66'	Report	Warner (yellow card) 24'	Stadium: StubHub Center; Attendance: 25,667; Referee: Mark Geiger

July 23, 2016 20	Houston Dynamo	0-0	Vancouver Whitecaps FC	Houston
20:30 CT	Wenger (yellow card) 62'	Report	Hurtado (yellow card) 84'	Stadium: BBVA Compass Stadium; Attendance: 16,465; Referee: Jaime Herrera

July 31, 2016 21	Houston Dynamo	1-1	San Jose Earthquakes	Houston
19:45 CT	Mansally (yellow card) 17'; Lima (yellow card) 40', (goal) 45+2'	Report	Wondolowski 60'; Stewart (yellow card) 90'	Stadium: BBVA Compass Stadium; Attendance: 15,045; Referee: Alan Kelly

August 6, 2016 22	Montreal Impact	1-0	Houston Dynamo	Montreal
18:30 CT	Mancosu 76'; Bernardello (yellow card) 86'	Report	Horst (yellow card) 41'; Williams (yellow card) 61'	Stadium: Stade Saputo; Attendance: 20,801; Referee: Marcos de Oliveira

August 14, 2016 23	Houston Dynamo	1-1	Toronto	Houston
20:15 CT	Maidana 8'; Mansally (red card) 45+2'	Report	Altidore 24'; Bradley (yellow card) 86'	Stadium: BBVA Compass Stadium; Attendance: 17,474; Referee: Hilario Grajeda

August 19, 2016 24	San Jose Earthquakes	1-2	Houston Dynamo	San Jose
22:00 CT	Stewart (yellow card) 48'; Bernárdez 54', (yellow card) 55'	Report	Clark 6'; Anibaba (yellow card) 18'; Horst 50'; Willis (yellow card) 54'; García (yellow card) 86'	Stadium: Avaya Stadium; Attendance: 18,000; Referee: Robert Sibiga

August 24, 2016 25	Houston Dynamo	1-1	Seattle Sounders FC	Houston
19:45 CT	Wenger 75'	Report	Roldan (yellow card) 50'; Lodeiro 90+4'	Stadium: BBVA Compass Stadium; Attendance: 16,125; Referee: Armando Villarreal

August 27, 2016 26	Houston Dynamo	1-3	Dallas	Houston
19:45 CT	Alex 19'; Torres (yellow card) 90+3'	Report	Díaz 59' (pen.); Barrios 60', 79'	Stadium: BBVA Compass Stadium; Attendance: 18,769; Referee: Kevin Stott

September 9, 2016 27	Sporting Kansas City	3-3	Houston Dynamo	Kansas City
19:00 CT	Peterson 14'; Espinoza (yellow card) 18', (goal) 26'; Dwyer 81'	Report	Manotas 31'; Alex 59', (yellow card) 83'; Warner (yellow card) 65'; Rodríguez 90+4'	Stadium: Children's Mercy Park; Attendance: 19,331; Referee: Alan Kelly

September 17, 2016 28	Real Salt Lake	0-1	Houston Dynamo	Sandy
20:30 CT	Beltran (yellow card) 76'	Report	Alex (yellow card) 33', (goal) 36'; Williams (yellow card) 54'; Maidana (yellow card) 69'; Willis (yellow card) 81'; Clark (yellow card) 85'; Alexander (yellow card) 90+3'	Stadium: Rio Tinto Stadium; Attendance: 19,795; Referee: Silviu Petrescu

September 24, 2016 29	Houston Dynamo	3-1	Portland Timbers	Houston
19:45 CT	Manotas 34', 73', 85'	Report	Valeri 51'	Stadium: BBVA Compass Stadium; Attendance: 19,404; Referee: Juan Guzman

September 30, 2016 30	Houston Dynamo	0-2	New York City	Houston
18:45 CT	Rodríguez (yellow card) 57'	Report	Villa 52', 90+1'; McNamara (yellow card) 62'	Stadium: BBVA Compass Stadium; Attendance: 19,616; Referee: Robert Sibiga

October 8, 2016 31	Houston Dynamo	2-3	Colorado Rapids	Houston
19:15 CT	Manotas 45', 81'; Alex (yellow card) 90+2'	Report	Badji 12', 54'; Gashi 79'; Cronin (yellow card) 83'; Azira (yellow card) 90+1'	Stadium: BBVA Compass Stadium; Attendance: 18,400; Referee: Jose Carlos Rivero

October 12, 2016 32	Seattle Sounders FC	0-0	Houston Dynamo	Seattle
21:30 CT	Alonso (red card) 64'	Report	Clark (yellow card) 43'; Bruin (yellow card) 64'	Stadium: CenturyLink Field; Attendance: 39,772; Referee: Drew Fischer

October 16, 2016 33	Houston Dynamo	0-1	LA Galaxy	Houston
17:45 CT		Report	Gordon 72'	Stadium: BBVA Compass Stadium; Attendance: 21,085; Referee: Kevin Stott

October 23, 2016 34	Colorado Rapids	1-1	Houston Dynamo	Commerce City
15:00 CT	Gashi 67'; Jones (yellow card) 88'; Burch (yellow card) 90+4'	Report	Wenger 20'; García (yellow card) 74'; Williams (yellow card) 90+4'	Stadium: Dick's Sporting Goods Park; Attendance: 18,446; Referee: Ismail Elfath

==== Overall table ====
Pos	Team	Pld	W	L	T	GF	GA	GD	Pts	Qualification
1	FC Dallas (S, U)	34	17	8	9	50	40	+10	60	Qualification for the CONCACAF Champions League
2	Colorado Rapids	34	15	6	13	39	32	+7	58	Qualification for the CONCACAF Champions League
3	New York Red Bulls	34	16	9	9	61	44	+17	57	Qualification for the CONCACAF Champions League
4	New York City FC	34	15	10	9	62	57	+5	54	
5	Toronto FC (V)	34	14	9	11	51	39	+12	53	Qualification for the CONCACAF Champions League
6	LA Galaxy	34	12	6	16	54	39	+15	52	
7	Seattle Sounders FC (C)	34	14	14	6	44	43	+1	48	Qualification for the CONCACAF Champions League
8	Sporting Kansas City	34	13	13	8	42	41	+1	47	
9	Real Salt Lake	34	12	12	10	44	46	−2	46	
10	D.C. United	34	11	10	13	53	47	+6	46	
11	Montreal Impact	34	11	11	12	49	53	−4	45	
12	Portland Timbers	34	12	14	8	48	53	−5	44	
13	Philadelphia Union	34	11	14	9	52	55	−3	42	
14	New England Revolution	34	11	14	9	44	54	−10	42	
15	Orlando City SC	34	9	11	14	55	60	−5	41	
16	Vancouver Whitecaps FC	34	10	15	9	45	52	−7	39	
17	San Jose Earthquakes	34	8	12	14	32	40	−8	38	
18	Columbus Crew SC	34	8	14	12	50	58	−8	36	
19	Houston Dynamo	34	7	14	13	39	45	−6	34	
20	Chicago Fire	34	7	17	10	42	58	−16	31	

Source: MLS
Rules for classification: 1) points; 2) total wins; 3) total goal differential; 4) total goals scored;
(C) MLS Cup champions; (S) Supporters' Shield winners; (U) U.S. Open Cup winners; (V) Canadian Championship winners

=== U.S. Open Cup ===
June 15, 2016 Fourth Round	Houston Dynamo	4–0	San Antonio	Houston
19:15 CDT	Manotas 39'; Alex 45+5'; Rodríguez 60'; Miranda 66'	Report		Stadium: BBVA Compass Stadium; Attendance: 5,807; Referee: Leszek Stalmach

June 29, 2016 Round of 16	Houston Dynamo	3–1	Sporting Kansas City	Houston
18:00 CDT	Manotas 7', 84'; Anibaba (yellow card) 52'; Alex 55'; Willis (yellow card) 86'	Report	Davis 61'; Espinoza (yellow card) 88'	Stadium: BBVA Compass Stadium; Attendance: 6,371; Referee: Allen Chapman

July 20, 2016 Quarterfinal	Houston Dynamo	0-1	Dallas	Houston
19:30 CDT	Manotas (yellow card) 23'; Clark (yellow card) 71'; Mansally (yellow card) 83'	Report	Harris (yellow card) 88'; Castillo 90+1'	Stadium: BBVA Compass Stadium; Attendance: 10,150; Referee: Nima Saghafi

== Player statistics ==
As of match played October 23, 2016

=== Appearances and goals ===
No.	Pos	Nat	Player	Total		MLS		U.S. Open Cup	
No.	Pos	Nat	Player	Apps	Goals	Apps	Goals	Apps	Goals
1	GK	(United States) USA	Tyler Deric	10	0	10	0	0	0
2	DF	(United States) USA	Jalil Anibaba	32	0	28+2	0	1+1	0
3	MF	(United States) USA	Rob Lovejoy	2	0	2	0	0	0
4	DF	(Spain) ESP	Agus	11	0	8	0	3	0
5	DF	(Spain) ESP	Raúl Rodríguez	27	2	24+1	1	1+1	1
6	MF	(United States) USA	Eric Alexander	10	0	3+7	0	0	0
7	MF	(United States) USA	DaMarcus Beasley	25	1	24	1	1	0
8	MF	(Argentina) ARG	Cristian Maidana	33	3	21+9	3	2+1	0
11	FW	(United States) USA	Andrew Wenger	34	6	24+8	6	2	0
12	FW	(United States) USA	Will Bruin	32	4	18+13	4	0+1	0
13	MF	(United States) USA	Ricardo Clark	33	4	29+3	4	1	0
14	MF	(Brazil) BRA	Alex	33	7	29+1	5	2+1	2
18	DF	(United States) USA	David Horst	28	3	24+2	3	2	0
19	FW	(Colombia) COL	Mauro Manotas	25	9	10+12	6	3	3
20	DF	(The Gambia) GAM	Abdoulie Mansally	11	0	5+4	0	2	0
22	DF	(United States) USA	Sheanon Williams	24	0	20+2	0	2	0
23	MF	(Honduras) HON	José Escalante	3	0	1+2	0	0	0
26	MF	(United States) USA	Collen Warner	26	0	24	0	1+1	0
27	MF	(Honduras) HON	Boniek García	34	0	24+7	0	1+2	0
28	MF	(Colombia) COL	Yair Arboleda	1	0	1	0	0	0
30	DF	(Costa Rica) CRC	Keyner Brown	4	0	3+1	0	0	0
31	GK	(United States) USA	Joe Willis	29	0	24+2	0	3	0
Players eligible from Rio Grande Valley:
32	FW	(United States) USA	T. J. Casner	1	0	0	0	0+1	0
Players away from the club on loan:
9	FW	(Mexico) MEX	Erick Torres	11	0	4+7	0	0	0
21	MF	(United States) USA	Zach Steinberger	1	0	0	0	1	0
Players who left Houston Dynamo during the season:
6	MF	(Spain) ESP	David Rocha	6	0	4	0	2	0
10	FW	(Jamaica) JAM	Giles Barnes	15	4	13+1	4	1	0
33	MF	(Argentina) ARG	Leonel Miranda	14	2	3+9	1	2	1

=== Goal scorers ===
As of match played October 23, 2016

Place	Position	Nation	Number	Name	MLS	U.S. Open Cup	Total
1	FW	(Colombia)	19	Mauro Manotas	6	3	9
2	MF	(Brazil)	14	Alex	5	2	7
3	FW	(United States)	11	Andrew Wenger	6	0	6
4	MF	(United States)	13	Ricardo Clark	4	0	4
4	FW	(United States)	12	Will Bruin	4	0	4
4	FW	(Jamaica)	10	Giles Barnes	4	0	4
7	MF	(Argentina)	8	Cristian Maidana	3	0	3
7	DF	(United States)	18	David Horst	3	0	3
9	MF	(Argentina)	33	Leonel Miranda	1	1	2
9	DF	(Spain)	5	Raúl Rodríguez	1	1	2
11	MF	(United States)	7	DaMarcus Beasley	1	0	1
11				Own goal	1	0	1
TOTALS					39	7	46

=== Assists ===
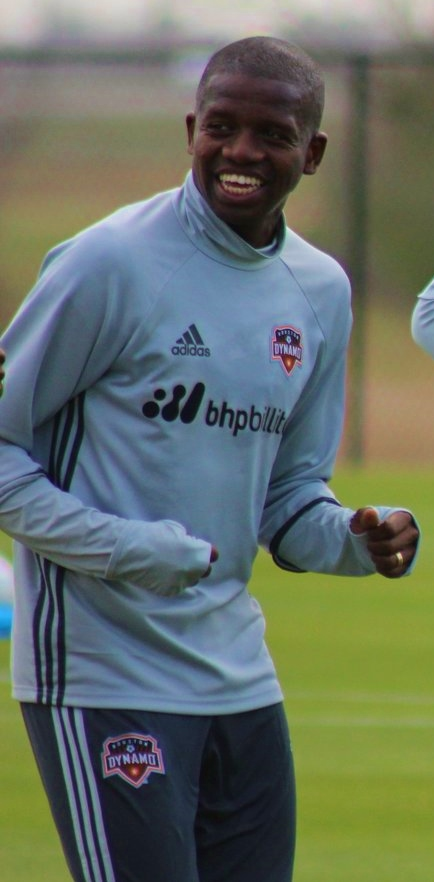
Boniek Garcia became the first player other than Brad Davis to lead the dynamo in assists since 2007.

As of match played October 23, 2016

Place	Position	Nation	Number	Name	MLS	U.S. Open Cup	Total
1	MF	(Honduras)	27	Boniek García	9	0	9
2	MF	(Argentina)	8	Cristian Maidana	4	0	0
2	MF	(United States)	13	Ricardo Clark	4	0	0
4	FW	(United States)	12	Will Bruin	3	0	0
4	FW	(United States)	11	Andrew Wenger	3	0	0
6	FW	(Jamaica)	10	Giles Barnes	2	0	0
6	MF	(Brazil)	14	Alex	2	0	2
8	FW	(Mexico)	9	Erick Torres Padilla	1	0	1
8	MF	(Argentina)	33	Leonel Miranda	1	0	1
8	FW	(Colombia)	19	Mauro Manotas	1	0	1
8	DF	(United States)	22	Sheanon Williams	1	0	1
8	MF	(United States)	26	Collen Warner	1	0	1
8	DF	(United States)	2	Jalil Anibaba	1	0	1
TOTALS					33	0	33

=== Disciplinary record ===
As of match played October 23, 2016

Number	Nation	Position	Name	MLS		U.S. Open Cup		Total	
Number	Nation	Position	Name	Yellow card	Red card	Yellow card	Red card	Yellow card	Red card
1	(United States)	GK	Tyler Deric	0	2	0	0	0	2
2	(United States)	DF	Jalil Anibaba	4	0	1	0	5	0
5	(Spain)	DF	Raúl Rodríguez	3	0	0	0	3	0
6	(United States)	DF	Eric Alexander	1	0	0	0	1	0
7	(United States)	MF	DaMarcus Beasley	1	0	0	0	1	0
8	(Argentina)	MF	Cristian Maidana	1	0	0	0	1	0
9	(Mexico)	FW	Erick Torres Padilla	1	0	0	0	1	0
11	(United States)	FW	Andrew Wenger	3	0	0	0	3	0
12	(United States)	FW	Will Bruin	1	0	0	0	1	0
13	(United States)	MF	Ricardo Clark	4	0	1	0	5	0
14	(Brazil)	MF	Alex	8	1	0	0	8	1
18	(United States)	DF	David Horst	4	0	0	0	4	0
19	(Colombia)	FW	Mauro Manotas	0	0	1	0	1	0
20	(The Gambia)	DF	Abdoulie Mansally	1	1	1	0	2	1
22	(United States)	DF	Sheanon Williams	3	0	0	0	3	0
26	(United States)	MF	Collen Warner	2	0	0	0	2	0
27	(Honduras)	MF	Boniek García	4	0	0	0	4	0
31	(United States)	GK	Joe Willis	2	0	1	0	3	0
			TOTALS	43	4	5	0	48	4

== See also ==
- Houston Dynamo
- 2016 in American soccer
- 2016 Major League Soccer season
