= Ricardo Clark =

American soccer player (born 1983)

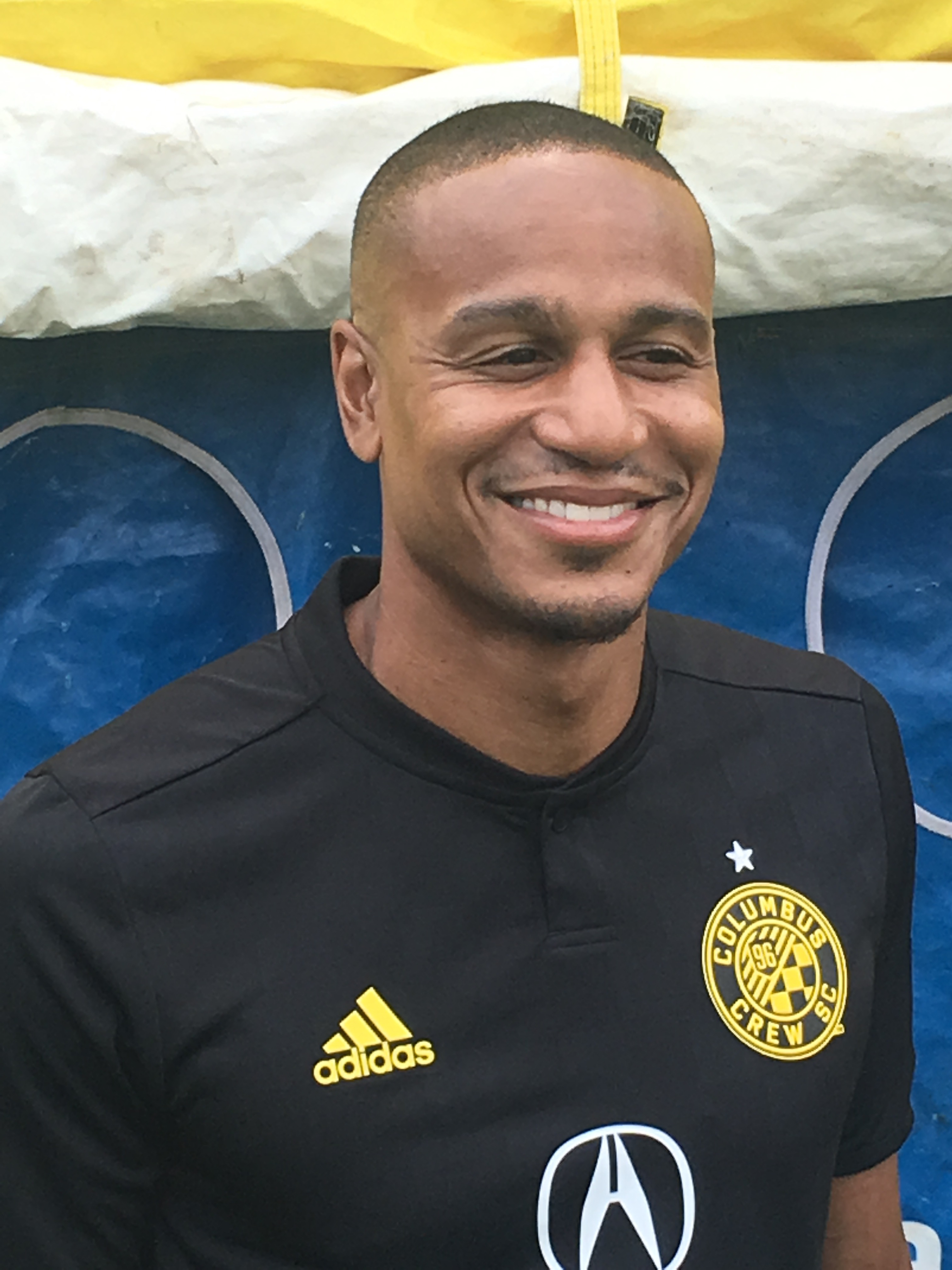
- Clark with the Columbus Crew in 2018

Personal information
- Full name: Ricardo Anthony Clark
- Date of birth: February 10, 1983 (age 43)
- Place of birth: Atlanta, Georgia, United States
- Height: 5 ft 10 in (1.78 m)
- Position: Midfielder

Team information
- Current team: Seattle Sounders FC (assistant coach)

Youth career
- –2001: AFC Lightning

College career
| Years | Team | Apps | (Gls) |
| 2001–2002 | Furman Paladins | 37 | (3) |

Senior career*
| Years | Team | Apps | (Gls) |
| 2003–2004 | MetroStars | 54 | (4) |
| 2005 | San Jose Earthquakes | 30 | (3) |
| 2006–2009 | Houston Dynamo | 97 | (7) |
| 2010–2012 | Eintracht Frankfurt | 15 | (0) |
| 2012 | → Stabæk (loan) | 12 | (0) |
| 2012–2017 | Houston Dynamo | 156 | (21) |
| 2018–2019 | Columbus Crew SC | 20 | (1) |
| Total | | 384 | (36) |

International career
| 2000–2001 | United States U18 | 6 | (3) |
| 2002–2003 | United States U20 | 47 | (3) |
| 2003 | United States U23 | 2 | (0) |
| 2005–2012 | United States | 34 | (3) |

Managerial career
- 2021–2025: Vancouver Whitecaps FC (assistant)
- 2023–2025: Whitecaps FC 2
- 2026–: Seattle Sounders FC (assistant)
Medal record
United States
FIFA Confederations Cup
| Runner-up | 2009 South Africa |
CONCACAF Gold Cup
| Winner | 2007 United States |
- * Club domestic league appearances and goals

Ricardo Anthony Clark (born February 10, 1983) is an American former soccer player who played as a midfielder. He appeared for MetroStars, San Jose Earthquakes, Houston Dynamo and Columbus Crew SC in the United States, Eintracht Frankfurt in Germany, and Stabæk in Norway. Clark also appeared for the United States national team from 2005 to 2012.

A native of Atlanta, Clark played two years in college at Furman before being drafted second overall in the 2003 MLS SuperDraft by MetroStars. After two seasons and nearly 100 appearances, he was traded to San Jose Earthquakes. The franchise moved from San Jose to Houston for the 2006 season, becoming the Houston Dynamo, and Clark followed along. He spent four seasons with the Dynamo, helping the club win two MLS Cups, before departing for Europe. Clark spent three years in Europe, playing for Eintracht Frankfurt and Stabæk, before returning to the United States and the Dynamo midway through the 2012 Major League Soccer season. He spent the next six years in Houston, departing at the end of 2017 with 304 appearances for the Dynamo across his two spells. Clark signed as a free agent with Columbus Crew SC, spending his final two professional seasons with the Crew before retiring following the 2019 season.

At international level, Clark appeared for the United States at the 2003 FIFA World Youth Championship. He earned his first senior cap in October 2005 against Panama, and went on to score three goals in 34 caps for his country. Clark represented the United States at two CONCACAF Gold Cups, helped the U.S. to the final of the 2009 FIFA Confederations Cup, and played at the 2010 FIFA World Cup. He earned his final senior cap in January 2012. Clark has been an assistant coach for Seattle Sounders FC in Major League Soccer since 2026.

== Youth and college ==
Born in Atlanta, Georgia, Clark attended St. Pius X Catholic High School. He is of Trinidadian descent through his father. He was a two-time state champion and state player of the year with the Golden Lions, winning GHSA titles as a sophomore and senior and State Player of the Year nods as a junior and senior. His senior season, St. Pius X went 22–1 while Clark was named as a Parade All-American. At club level, he won two state titles with AFC Lightning and was named as the MVP of the 2000 Adidas ESP Camp. Clark committed to play college soccer at Furman University, part of a recruiting class ranked fourth in the nation.

Clark played only two collegiate seasons at Furman, making 37 appearances and notching three goals for the Paladins. In just his second collegiate game, he provided an assist to John Barry Nusum as part of a 3–2 victory over Notre Dame. Clark suffered through a foot injury during the second half of his freshman season, finishing the year with 15 appearances. His first goal for Furman had to wait until his sophomore season, during a 4–3 victory in overtime against UNC Greensboro. That goal came on September 21, 2002; Clark also scored on September 27 against Fairfield and October 27 against South Carolina. He finished the season with three goals in 22 appearances, and was named as an NSCAA first team all-American. Clark was also named to the NSCAA all-South Region first team, the College Soccer News all-America first team, and as a Soccer America MVP to conclude the season.

== Club career ==
=== MetroStars ===
Following his sophomore year at Furman, Clark signed a Project-40 contract with Major League Soccer and entered the 2003 MLS SuperDraft, where he was selected second overall by MetroStars. He stepped immediately into the starting lineup for the Metros, making his professional debut on April 12, 2003, against Columbus Crew. Clark would go on to set a club rookie record, starting the first 27 games of the season, and making 28 total appearances in MLS play. In the midst of that stretch, he had a run of three goals in four games: against Chicago Fire on June 28, D.C. United on July 5, and New England Revolution on July 12. Clark also played a large role for the club in their run to the 2003 U.S. Open Cup Final, where they were defeated 1–0 by Chicago. After appearing 35 times in all competitions with three goals, Clark was named a finalist for the MLS Rookie of the Year Award; he lost out to Damani Ralph of Chicago.

Clark started his second professional season slowly after suffering a preseason injury; he came off the bench in the season opener against Columbus, but had to wait until the end of April against New England to get his first turn in the starting lineup. He scored his only goal of the season in the regular season finale against D.C. United, a 50th minute rocket as part of a 3–2 defeat. For the second straight season, Clark started both playoff matches for the Metros as they were knocked out in the quarterfinals. He scored once in 28 total appearances on the year, bringing his total with the club to four goals in 63 games.

=== San Jose/Houston ===
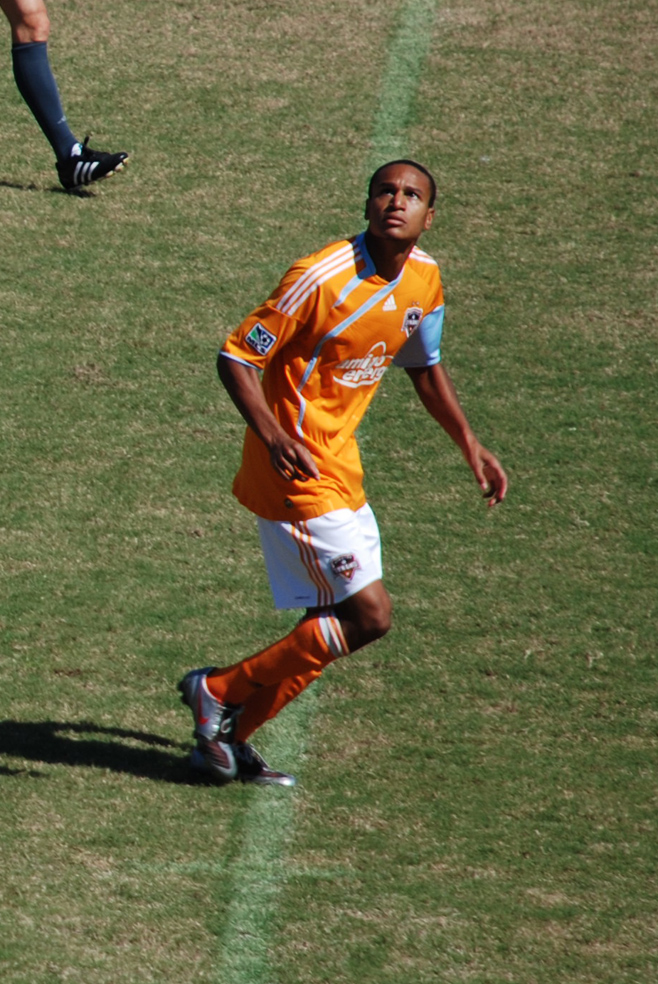
Clark with Houston in 2009

Clark was traded to San Jose Earthquakes on January 14, 2005, in exchange for allocation money and a youth international roster slot. The trade occurred on the same day as the 2005 MLS SuperDraft, meaning that Clark became one of eight players that joined the Earthquakes on the day.

He jumped immediately into the starting lineup in 2005, making his club debut with a start in the season opener against New England Revolution on April 2. Playing out of a defensive midfield role, Clark found the back of the net three times on the season: July 2 away to FC Dallas, August 13 against Colorado Rapids, and September 10 against Chivas USA. He was named as the MLS Player of the Month for July, also earning a nod as the club's player of the month that month. Clark scored his first career playoff goal on October 23, in the first leg of the conference semifinals against LA Galaxy; the Galaxy would win the match, 3–1, and took the series by a 4–2 aggregate scoreline. Clark finished the season with 32 appearances and four goals across all competitions.

Due to San Jose's failure to reach a stadium agreement with AEG, Clark, along with the rest of his Earthquakes teammates, moved to Houston for the 2006 season. He started in the inaugural match for Houston Dynamo, a 5–2 victory over Colorado on April 2. Clark went on to start 31 times during the regular season, scoring twice: the first goal in Texas Derby history on May 6 and the tying goal on June 10 against New York Red Bulls. However, the second half of his season was marred by a couple of bookings. On August 26, Clark received the first red card of his career, coming in a 3–2 defeat against Chivas USA. He then picked up a pair of yellow cards in the playoffs, meaning that he would be suspended for MLS Cup 2006. With Adrian Serioux starting in his place, Houston defeated New England Revolution on penalties to win the first trophy in club history. Clark made 36 appearances on the season, scoring twice, and was named to the MLS Best XI.

Clark began 2007 by making his continental debut in the 2007 CONCACAF Champions' Cup, appearing in three of Houston's four games against Puntarenas and Pachuca. He then missed more than a month of the 2007 season on national team duty, appearing in the 2007 CONCACAF Gold Cup and 2007 Copa América. His play through the first half of the season, including a goal against FC Dallas on June 3, earned him a spot in the 2007 MLS All-Star Game, the second consecutive season that Clark had been selected as an all-star. Following his return from the United States squad, he scored for the second time on the season on September 16, in a 3–1 victory over LA Galaxy. However, Clark's season ended at the end of September. He missed the final two regular season and all playoff matches due to a suspension resulting from a deliberate kick aimed at a prone Carlos Ruiz in a match with FC Dallas on September 30. Clark was sent off, received a nine-game suspension, and was fined $10,000, the most severe punishment in MLS history. In his absence, Houston went on to win MLS Cup 2007, repeating as MLS Cup champions. Clark finished the season with 23 appearances and two goals across all competitions.

Clark's suspension carried over for the first two games of the 2008 season, but he jumped immediately back into the Houston lineup afterwards. He notched two goals in 25 appearances in MLS play, scoring against Chicago Fire on May 17 and Real Salt Lake on August 16. Clark also played a large role in Houston's continental competitions, playing 16 times and scoring once across the three competitions. He played every minute of the Dynamo's four matches in the CONCACAF Champions' Cup, repeated the feat across five games in the North American SuperLiga, and played in seven games of Houston's 2008–09 CONCACAF Champions League campaign. In the group stage of the SuperLiga, Clark scored his first career goal in a continental competition, coming in a 3–1 victory over D.C. United. He also converted during the penalty shootout in the final of that competition against New England, although the Revolution took the title by a 6–5 mark. Clark made a career-high 43 appearances in all competitions in 2008, scoring three times.

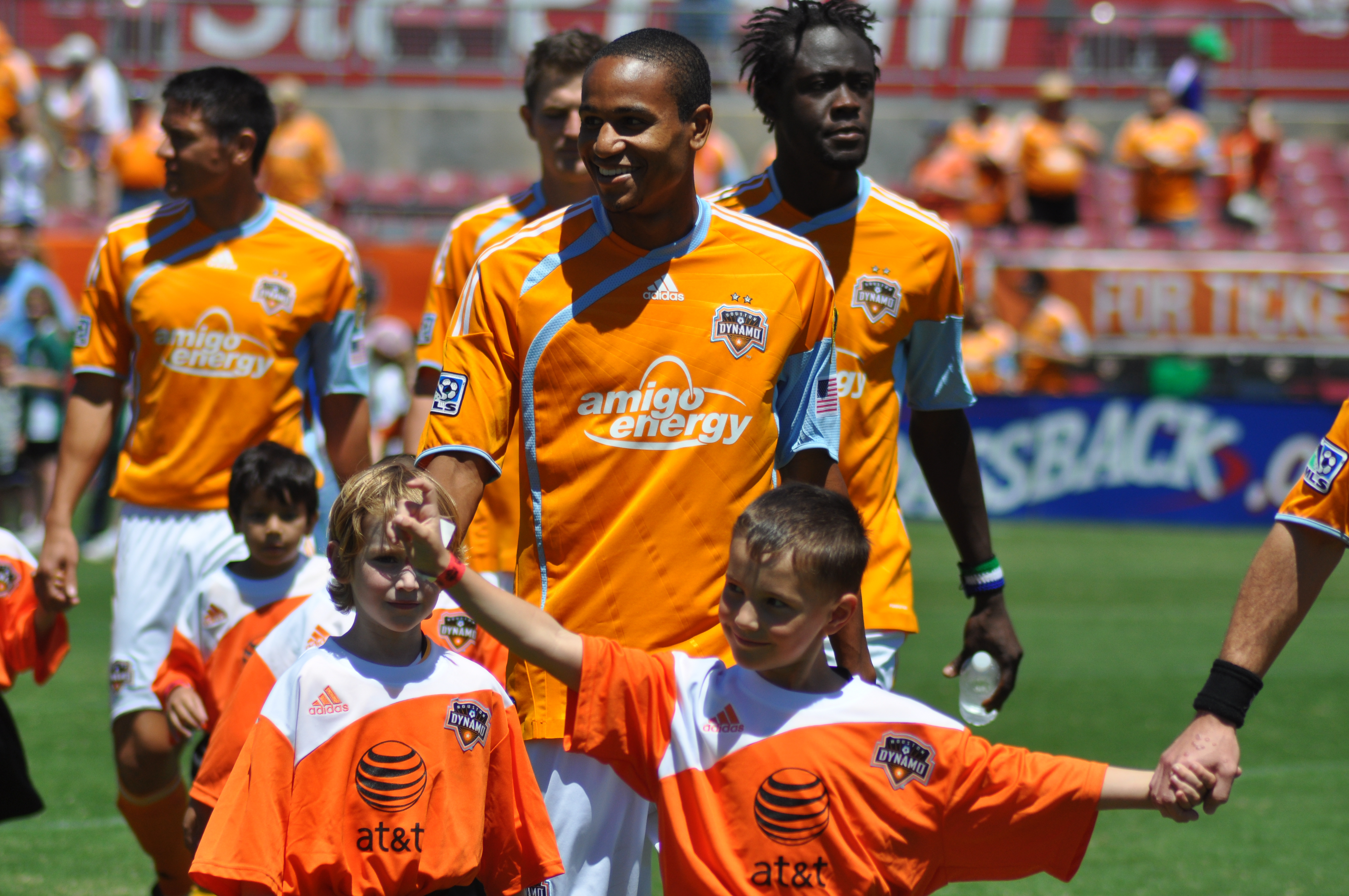
Clark played 304 times for Houston Dynamo across his two spells with the club

Clark missed time during the summer of 2009, earning a call up to the United States for the 2009 FIFA Confederations Cup. He scored his only goal of the season following his return to from South Africa, a strike on August 9 in a 3–2 victory over Chicago. Thanks in part to his international duties, Clark only made 22 appearances in league play. He also saw his playing time in the CONCACAF Champions League decrease, appearing in two of the Dynamo's six games in the competition. Clark did play every minute in the MLS Cup Playoffs, including going 120 minutes against LA Galaxy in the conference finals on November 13. Houston was defeated 2–0 after extra time, and with Clark's contract expiring at the end of the season it would mark his final match of his first stint with the club. He announced following the season that he would pursue opportunities abroad, departing Houston with eight goals in 129 appearances across four seasons with the Dynamo.

During the summer of 2009, following his performance at the Confederations Cup, Clark had received interest from multiple European clubs. Stade Rennais of Ligue 1 and newly promoted Serie A club Livorno both reported interest in the player, either to sign him during the summer window or once his contract with MLS expired in January. Both moves fell through, leaving Clark with Houston through the end of the season.

=== Eintracht Frankfurt ===
Clark, whose contract with MLS expired at the end of the 2009 season, signed a deal with Bundesliga club Eintracht Frankfurt for the remainder of the 2009–10 season with an option to extend the contract at the end of the season. He made his club debut on April 24, 2010, against Mainz 05, playing the full 90 minutes in a 3–3 draw. Clark started each of the last three matches on the season for Eintracht as the club finished 10th in the league. Prior to the season finale against VfL Wolfsburg, and despite the injury he had suffered after arriving in Germany, Clark inked a three-year contract with Frankfurt.

As Eintracht struggled towards relegation in 2010–11, Clark also struggled to become a mainstay in the starting lineup for the club. He made his season debut in a 4–0 victory over Borussia Mönchengladbach in early September, replacing Pirmin Schwegler in the 89th minute. Clark appeared in four of Eintracht's nine victories on the season, and six of their 16 total results, but could not prevent the club from slumping to 17th place and just the fourth relegation in club history. He did make his DFB-Pokal debut in late December, playing the full 120 minutes in a 5–3 penalty kick defeat against Alemannia Aachen that eliminated Eintracht from the competition. Clark finished the season having made just 12 appearances in all competitions for the club.

Clark made his debut appearance in the 2. Bundesliga on July 25, 2011, against FC St. Pauli, going the full 90 minutes and picking up a yellow card in a 1–1 draw. However, he was unable to build on that start and only managed to make the bench three more times through the first half of the season, never again appearing for the club. Clark would be sent on loan to Norwegian club Stabæk in February, on a deal running through the end of July. On July 18, 2012, before that loan had even expired, Eintracht confirmed that Clark's contract had been terminated by mutual consent, effective at the end of his loan spell in Norway. Clark officially departed Eintracht Frankfurt having appeared 16 times in all competitions for the club, and just once during his final season in Germany.

==== Loan to Stabæk ====
On February 22, 2012, after struggling for playing time with Eintracht, Clark was sent on loan to Stabæk of the Tippeligaen. The Norwegian club confirmed that the loan ran through the end of July. He made his club debut a little more than a month later, playing the full 90 minutes in a scoreless draw against Aalesund on March 25. Clark was a fixture in the Stabæk lineup during his time at the club, finishing his time in Norway by appearing in both legs of a Europa League first qualifying round tie against JJK as Stabæk were defeated 4–3 on aggregate by the Finnish club. He went 79 minutes in the opening leg defeat, but had to be replaced by Adnan Haidar before halftime in the second leg in what would mark his final match for the club. Clark concluded the loan spell having made 15 appearances across all competitions for Stabæk.

=== Return to Houston ===
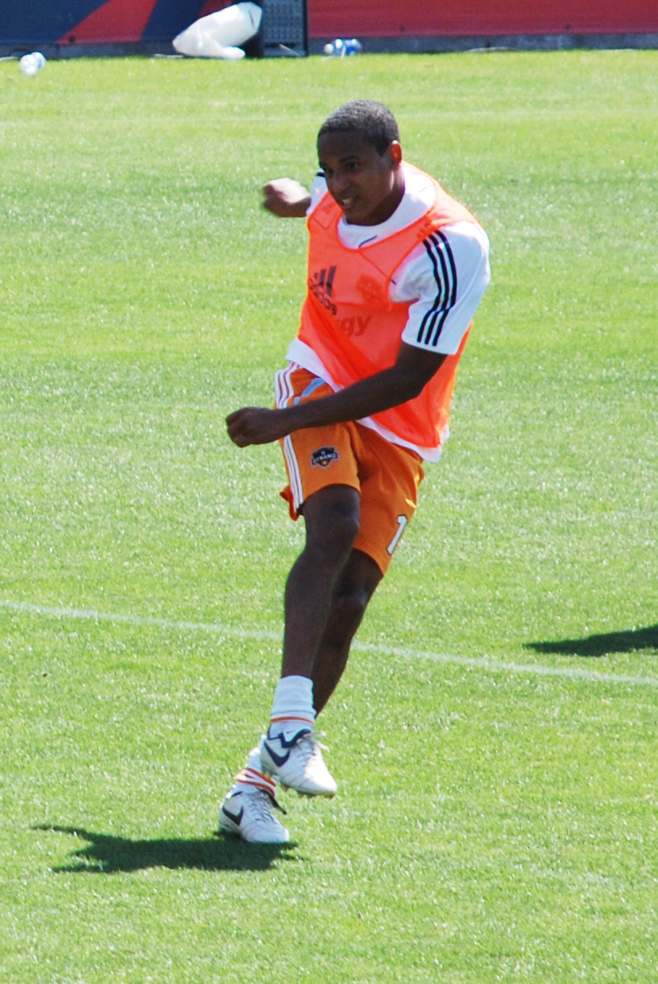
Clark is second in Dynamo history in games played, behind only Brad Davis

Following his release from Eintracht, Clark returned to the United States and signed again with Houston Dynamo, who had retained his Major League Soccer rights when he moved to Germany, on August 2, 2012. He was officially added to the roster on August 8, after Geoff Cameron finalized a move to Premier League side Stoke City. Clark made his second debut for the Dynamo two days later, coming on as a second-half substitute in a defeat against New York Red Bulls. His first goal since his return was scored on September 29, a 77th-minute strike to hand Houston a 2–0 victory over New England Revolution. Clark started in MLS Cup 2012 against LA Galaxy, but conceded the game-winning penalty as Houston were defeated 3–1. He finished the campaign with one goal in 18 appearances in all competitions.

Clark jumped straight into the 2013 season, scoring in the season opener against D.C. United and earning a nod to the MLS Team of the Week for week one. He notched his second goal on July 6 against Philadelphia Union, providing the winner in a 1–0 game, but then missed almost a month across July and August due to an unspecified illness. Following his return to action, Clark jumped back onto the scoresheet: he snapped a four-match winless run for Houston with the winning goal against Philadelphia on September 14, then tallied the only goal of a victory over Montreal Impact on October 4. In the playoffs, Clark again played a starring role for the Dynamo, scoring his first playoff goal for the club and adding an assist although the Dynamo were denied a third-straight trip to MLS Cup. Clark finished the season with final stats of 36 appearances and five goals; for his efforts, he was named as the Dynamo Player's Player of the Year.

The 2014 season was a disappointing one for Houston, who failed to qualify for the playoffs for only the second time in club history, as well as for Clark, who appeared in only 25 games because of injury. He suffered a concussion on April 23 against New York Red Bulls, and wound up missing eleven matches before returning against Montreal on June 29. After scoring twice prior to his injury, Clark added two more goals following his return. He tallied strikes in back-to-back games against Sporting Kansas City and Montreal, sparking the Dynamo to a six-match unbeaten run. The late effort wasn't enough, however, for the Dynamo to qualify for the playoffs, as they missed out for the first time since 2010. Clark made 25 appearances on the season, scoring four times.

2015 would prove to be the most productive season of Clark's career, as he appeared in 33 matches and scored a career-high nine goals. Four of those goals came through the first half of the season, including a pair in back-to-back games against Montreal and D.C. United in mid-April. He also scored his first career U.S. Open Cup goal, coming two minutes into stoppage time of a fourth round victory over Austin Aztex. Clark continued his tear through the second half of the season, tallying match-winning goals against San Jose on July 10 and Vancouver Whitecaps FC on August 29. Although Houston won points in seven out of the eight games he scored in, the Dynamo fell nine points short of qualifying for the playoffs, missing out for the second straight season. Following the season, Clark was named as the club's Most Valuable Player, Player's Player of the Year, and Humanitarian of the Year. He also earned recognition from the fans as Midfielder of the Year. Clark became a free agent at the end of the season, but re-signed with Houston on December 8.

In his ninth season in Houston, Clark appeared in a career-high 32 league matches; that included his 275th regular season start (against Columbus in April) and his 300th career MLS appearance (against San Jose in August). Clark scored four times on the season, twice against San Jose and twice in the Texas Derby against FC Dallas. The goals against Dallas, in March and June, were his fifth and sixth in the Derby, tying Brian Ching for the most in the history of the series. Clark appeared 33 times in all competitions, augmenting his four goals with a career-high four assists.

Ahead of the 2017 season, Clark was named as the sixth club captain in Dynamo history, taking over from DaMarcus Beasley when Wilmer Cabrera was named as the head coach. Clark did not score a goal in any competition in 2017, the first time in his MLS career that he did not tally a league goal. He missed time early in the season because of tightness in his left adductor, sitting out two matches in late April due to the injury. On May 20, Clark made his professional debut in his hometown of Atlanta, entering the 4–1 defeat against Atlanta United as a substitute. The Dynamo returned to the playoffs for the first time in four seasons, with Clark appearing twice as part of the club's run to the Western Conference finals. He finished the season having appeared 30 times in all competitions. On December 5, Houston declined the option on Clark's contract, making him a free agent and ending his eleven-year affiliation with the organization. He departed the Dynamo after 175 appearances and 23 goals through his second stint with the club, bringing his all-time mark in Houston to 304 appearances and 31 goals.

=== Columbus Crew SC ===
On February 2, 2018, Clark joined his fourth MLS club, signing as a free agent with Columbus Crew SC. At 34 years old at the time of his signing, he became the oldest player on the Columbus roster.

Prior to the season, Clark was named as part of the leadership council for Crew SC, joining Federico Higuaín, Hector Jiménez, Jonathan Mensah, Zack Steffen, and Josh Williams. The six collectively served as vice-captains behind captain Wil Trapp. Clark made his Columbus debut as a late substitute on March 10, replacing Lalas Abubakar six minutes into stoppage time of a 3–2 victory against Montreal Impact. He was on the field for less than a minute before the final whistle. On his second appearance, and first start, Clark scored his first goal for the club. From a Higuaín corner kick, he powered home the winning goal in a 3–1 victory over D.C. United. Clark played sparingly across the remainder of the season, finishing the season with one goal in 13 appearances. The club declined his contract option on November 26, but stated that they would "remain in contract dialogue" with Clark. On January 17, 2019, the two sides agreed to terms and he re-signed with Crew SC for the 2019 season.

Clark officially retired from playing professional soccer on February 12, 2020. He signed a ceremonial one day contract with Houston Dynamo for the announcement.

== International career ==
Clark received his first taste of international soccer with the United States U18 national team, earning six caps and scoring three goals during his two eligible years at that level. He was a key member of the squad that won the 2001 International Tournament of Lisbon, where he started all three matches.

Clark was bumped up to the United States U20 national team at the start of 2002, earning his first cap at that level on January 10 as part of a 1–0 victory over Canada. He was named in the squad for the 2002 C.O.T.I.F. XIX Torneig Internacional, helping the Americans to their best-ever finish; they were defeated by Brazil in the final. Clark closed out 2002 at the CONCACAF U20 qualifying tournament, helping the United States qualify for the 2003 FIFA World Youth Championship. After appearing 28 times for the U20s in 2002, Clark went on to play 19 more games in 2003, including another appearance in L'Alcúdia. His final caps at U20 level came in the United Arab Emirates at the World Youth Championship, where Clark played all five games for the Americans. His 47th and final appearance for the U20s came in a quarterfinal defeat against Argentina on December 12.

While also playing for the U20s, Clark earned his first cap for the United States U23 national team in May 2003; he played the full 90 minutes against Mexico as part of a 3–1 American victory. He only appeared one other time for the U23s, in an Olympic qualifier against St. Kitts and Nevis on November 15.

=== Early international career and 2007 tournaments ===
Clark received his first senior cap for the United States on October 12, 2005, in a World Cup qualifier against Panama. He replaced Kyle Martino in the 68th minute of a 2–0 American victory. Clark was not named to the squad for the 2006 FIFA World Cup, and thus did not earn another cap for more than a year. He returned to the team after Bob Bradley was named as the new head coach, making his first start for the U.S. in a friendly victory over Denmark on January 20, 2007. That summer, Clark was named to two American squads: the 2007 CONCACAF Gold Cup in the United States and the 2007 Copa América in Venezuela. He appeared four times in the Gold Cup, coming off the bench in all three knockout stage matches; in the final against Mexico, he replaced Pablo Mastroeni at halftime as part of the American comeback victory. At the Copa América, Clark appeared in all three matches as the United States was knocked out of the competition in the group stage. Against Paraguay on July 2, he scored his first international goal, a 40th-minute strike that would turn out to be the only goal from open play scored by the United States on the tournament.

=== 2009 Confederations Cup and World Cup qualifying ===
More than three years after earning his first World Cup qualifying cap, Clark earned his second; he started against Trinidad and Tobago on September 10, 2008, in a qualifier for the 2010 FIFA World Cup. He played in just two of the six Third Round qualifiers for the United States, but found a larger role in the Hexagonal, appearing in four of the ten American matches in the final round. On September 10, 2009, Clark scored his first World Cup qualifying goal, and just his second for the United States. Away to Trinidad and Tobago, Clark's 62nd-minute strike was the only score of a 1–0 victory, and guaranteed that the United States could finish no worse than fourth in the Hexagonal. He then went the distance against Honduras on October 10, as the U.S. clinched a spot in the World Cup with a 3–2 victory.

In the midst of that World Cup qualifying campaign, Clark was selected to the American squad for the 2009 FIFA Confederations Cup. He appeared in two group stage matches for the U.S., missing only the 3–0 defeat against Brazil. Clark went the distance in the semifinal victory over Spain, helping the United States to their first-ever Confederations Cup final. Against Brazil in the final, he played 88 minutes before being replaced by Conor Casey as the Americans chased the game; they finished as runners-up after a 3–2 defeat to the Seleção.

=== 2010 World Cup and later career ===
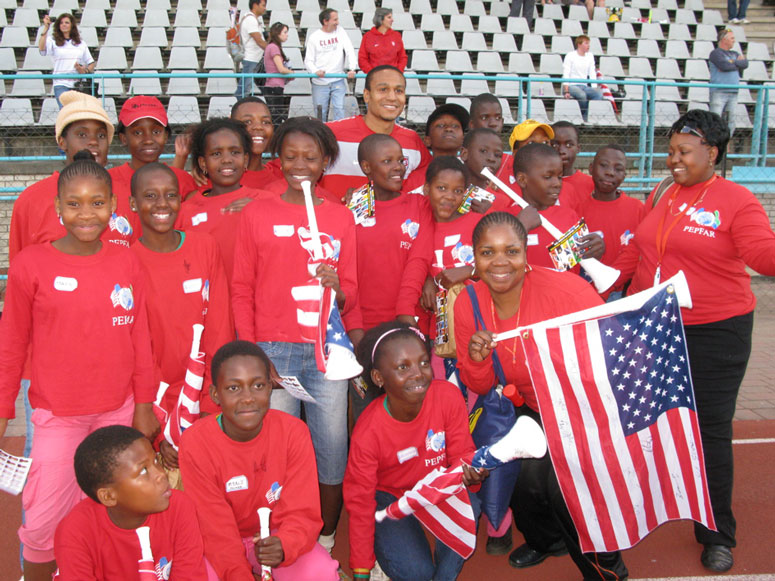
Clark with fans prior to the 2010 FIFA World Cup

Clark was named as part of the 30-man preliminary squad for the 2010 FIFA World Cup. Coach Bob Bradley named Clark as part of the 23-man squad that would take part in South Africa. He was one of nine midfielders selected to the team. After appearing in two tune-up matches prior to the tournament, Clark made his World Cup debut on June 12 with a start against England in the group stage. He also started in the Round of 16, a match that saw the United States defeated by Ghana after an extra time goal by Asamoah Gyan. Clark came in for criticism following the match, as he had committed the turnover that led to Ghana's opening goal in the fifth minute, picked up a yellow card in the seventh minute, and was substituted in the 31st minute.

Clark only appeared three more times for the United States following the World Cup. In Jürgen Klinsmann's debut as head coach, Clark was an 84th-minute substitute against Mexico, replacing José Francisco Torres. He scored his third and final international goal on January 22, 2012, a header seven minutes into second-half stoppage time to beat Venezuela. Four days later, Clark made what would turn out to be his final appearance for the United States, playing 67 minutes in a 1–0 victory over Panama. Clark earned 34 caps for the United States, scoring three goals across his eight years with the national team.

== Managerial career ==
On March 11, 2021, Vancouver Whitecaps FC announced that they hired Clark as an assistant coach for the first team. He was the head coach of Whitecaps FC 2, the reserve team for the Whitecaps, from 2023 to 2025. Clark joined Seattle Sounders FC as an assistant coach in January 2026.

== Career statistics ==
=== Club ===
As of July 17, 2019

| Club | Season | League | | | Playoffs (Note: All appearances in the MLS Cup Playoffs) | | Cup (Note: Includes the U.S. Open Cup, DFB-Pokal and Norwegian Football Cup) | | Continental | | Total | |
| Club | Season | Division | Apps | Goals | Apps | Goals | Apps | Goals | Apps | Goals | Apps | Goals |
|---|---|---|---|---|---|---|---|---|---|---|---|---|
| MetroStars | 2003 | MLS | 28 | 3 | 2 | 0 | 5 | 0 | – | | 35 | 3 |
| MetroStars | 2004 | MLS | 26 | 1 | 2 | 0 | 0 | 0 | – | | 28 | 1 |
| MetroStars | Total | | 54 | 4 | 4 | 0 | 5 | 0 | 0 | 0 | 63 | 4 |
| San Jose Earthquakes | 2005 | MLS | 30 | 3 | 2 | 1 | 0 | 0 | – | | 32 | 4 |
| Houston Dynamo | 2006 | MLS | 31 | 2 | 3 | 0 | 2 | 0 | – | | 36 | 2 |
| Houston Dynamo | 2007 | MLS | 19 | 2 | 0 | 0 | 0 | 0 | 4 (Note: Three appearances in CONCACAF Champions' Cup, one appearance in North American SuperLiga) | 0 | 23 | 2 |
| Houston Dynamo | 2008 | MLS | 25 | 2 | 2 | 0 | 0 | 0 | 14 (Note: Four appearances in CONCACAF Champions' Cup, five appearances and one goal in North American SuperLiga, five appearances in CONCACAF Champions League) | 1 | 41 | 3 |
| Houston Dynamo | 2009 | MLS | 22 | 1 | 3 | 0 | 0 | 0 | 4 (Note: Appearances in CONCACAF Champions League) | 0 | 29 | 1 |
| Houston Dynamo | Total | | 97 | 7 | 8 | 0 | 2 | 0 | 22 | 1 | 129 | 8 |
| Eintracht Frankfurt | 2009–10 | Bundesliga | 3 | 0 | – | | 0 | 0 | – | | 3 | 0 |
| Eintracht Frankfurt | 2010–11 | Bundesliga | 11 | 0 | – | | 1 | 0 | – | | 12 | 0 |
| Eintracht Frankfurt | 2011–12 | 2. Bundesliga | 1 | 0 | – | | 0 | 0 | – | | 1 | 0 |
| Eintracht Frankfurt | Total | | 15 | 0 | 0 | 0 | 1 | 0 | 0 | 0 | 16 | 0 |
| Stabæk (loan) | 2012 | Tippeligaen | 12 | 0 | – | | 1 | 0 | 2 (Note: Appearances in the Europa League) | 0 | 15 | 0 |
| Houston Dynamo | 2012 | MLS | 11 | 1 | 5 | 0 | 0 | 0 | 2 | 0 | 18 | 1 |
| Houston Dynamo | 2013 | MLS | 30 | 4 | 4 | 1 | 1 | 0 | 1 | 0 | 36 | 5 |
| Houston Dynamo | 2014 | MLS | 25 | 4 | – | | 0 | 0 | – | | 25 | 4 |
| Houston Dynamo | 2015 | MLS | 30 | 8 | – | | 3 | 1 | – | | 33 | 9 |
| Houston Dynamo | 2016 | MLS | 32 | 4 | – | | 1 | 0 | – | | 33 | 4 |
| Houston Dynamo | 2017 | MLS | 28 | 0 | 2 | 0 | 0 | 0 | – | | 30 | 0 |
| Houston Dynamo | Total | | 156 | 21 | 11 | 1 | 5 | 1 | 3 | 0 | 175 | 23 |
| Columbus Crew SC | 2018 | MLS | 13 | 1 | 0 | 0 | 0 | 0 | – | | 13 | 1 |
| Columbus Crew SC | 2019 | MLS | 7 | 0 | – | | 0 | 0 | – | | 7 | 0 |
| Columbus Crew SC | Total | | 20 | 1 | 0 | 0 | 0 | 0 | 0 | 0 | 20 | 1 |
| Career total | | | 384 | 36 | 25 | 2 | 14 | 1 | 27 | 1 | 450 | 40 |

=== International ===
As of January 25, 2012

United States
| Year | Apps | Goals |
|---|---|---|
| 2005 | 1 | 0 |
| 2006 | 0 | 0 |
| 2007 | 9 | 1 |
| 2008 | 6 | 0 |
| 2009 | 11 | 1 |
| 2010 | 4 | 0 |
| 2011 | 1 | 0 |
| 2012 | 2 | 1 |
| Total | 34 | 3 |

International goals
| No. | Date | Venue | Opponent | Score | Result | Competition |
|---|---|---|---|---|---|---|
| 1 | July 2, 2007 | Estadio Agustín Tovar, Barinas, Venezuela | Paraguay | 1–1 | 1–3 | 2007 Copa América |
| 2 | September 9, 2009 | Hasely Crawford Stadium, Port of Spain, Trinidad and Tobago | Trinidad and Tobago | 1–0 | 1–0 | 2010 FIFA World Cup qualification |
| 3 | January 21, 2012 | University of Phoenix Stadium, Glendale, Arizona, United States | Venezuela | 1–0 | 1–0 | Friendly |

== Honors ==
United States

- CONCACAF Gold Cup: 2007

San Jose Earthquakes

- Supporters' Shield: 2005

Houston Dynamo

- MLS Cup: 2006, 2007

Individual

- MLS Best XI: 2006
- MLS All-Star: 2006, 2007, 2008
- Houston Dynamo Player's Player of the Year: 2013, 2015
- Houston Dynamo MVP: 2015
- Houston Dynamo Humanitarian of the Year: 2015
