= Christian Lucatero =

American soccer player

Personal information
- Date of birth: June 17, 1997 (age 29)
- Place of birth: Pasadena, Texas, United States
- Height: 5 ft 9 in (1.75 m)
- Position: Midfielder

Youth career
- 2010–2015: Houston Dynamo

Senior career*
Years	Team	Apps	(Gls)
2016–2017	Houston Dynamo	0	(0)
2016–2017	→ Rio Grande Valley FC (loan)	33	(0)
2018–2020	Necaxa Premier	3	(0)
2020	Rio Grande Valley FC	8	(0)

International career
2015	United States U20	2	(0)
- * Club domestic league appearances and goals as of October 5, 2020

Christian Lucatero (born June 17, 1997) is an American soccer player.

== Career ==
=== Youth ===
Lucatero joined the Houston Dynamo academy in 2010. He was named the 2013 and 2015 Dynamo Academy Player of the Year, as well as winning the 2014 Dynamo Academy Players' Player of the Year award and 2014-15 U.S. Soccer Development Academy Central Conference Player of the Year. Lucatero scored 41 goals in his 54 appearances with the Dynamo U-18s.

=== Professional ===
On August 18, 2015, Lucatero signed a homegrown player contract with the Dynamo. He is the seventh Homegrown Player in Dynamo history. Lucatero had previously committed to play college soccer at Oregon State University before accepting the Dynamo's contract.

Lucatero was sent on loan to Houston's United Soccer League affiliate club Rio Grande Valley FC in March 2016. He made his professional debut on April 12, 2016, coming on as an 86th-minute substitute during a 2–2 draw against Seattle Sounders FC 2. Lucatero would make 18 appearances for the Toros in 2016, however he only got 271 minutes.

On March 23, 2017, Lucatero was sent on a season long loan to the Toros.

After Houston declined Lucatero's option at the end of the 2017 season. He signed with Liga MX side Club Necaxa on January 9, 2018.

On March 7, 2020, Lucatero returned to the United States and rejoined Rio Grande Valley FC.

== Personal life ==
Lucatero holds a Mexican passport, as both his parents were born in Mexico.

== Career statistics ==
As of April 16, 2019

Club Performance			League		Cup		Continental		Other		Total	
Club	Season	League	Apps	Goals	Apps	Goals	Apps	Goals	Apps	Goals	Apps	Goals
United States			League		US Open Cup		North America		Playoffs		Total	
Houston Dynamo	2016	Major League Soccer	0	0	0	0	—		—		0	0
Houston Dynamo	2017	Major League Soccer	0	0	0	0	—		0	0	0	0
Rio Grande Valley FC (loan)	2016	United Soccer League	18	0	—		—		0	0	18	0
Rio Grande Valley FC (loan)	2017	United Soccer League	15	0	—		—		—		15	0
Rio Grande Valley FC (loan)	RGVFC Total		33	0	0	0	0	0	0	0	33	0
Mexico			League		Copa MX		North America		Other		Total	
Necaxa	2017-18	Liga MX	0	0	0	0	—		—		0	0
Necaxa	2018-19	Liga MX	0	0	0	0	—		—		0	0
Career Totals			33	0	0	0	0	0	0	0	33	0
