= DaMarcus Beasley =

American soccer player (born 1982)

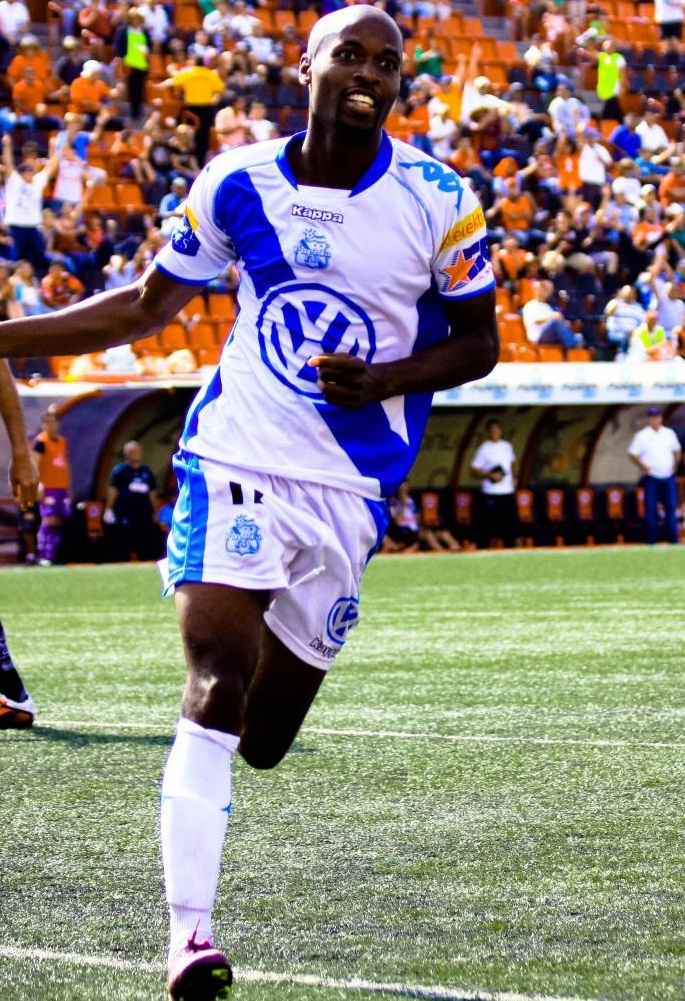
- Beasley with Puebla in 2013

Personal information
- Full name: DaMarcus Lamont Beasley
- Date of birth: May 24, 1982 (age 44)
- Place of birth: Fort Wayne, Indiana, United States
- Height: 5 ft 8 in (1.73 m)
- Positions: Winger; left wing-back

Youth career
- 1996-1997: South Side High School
- 1998–1999: IMG Academy

Senior career*
Years	Team	Apps	(Gls)
1999	LA Galaxy	0	(0)
1999	→ MLS Pro-40 (loan)	2	(6)
2000–2004	Chicago Fire	98	(14)
2000	→ MLS Pro-40 (loan)	3	(0)
2004–2007	PSV	56	(10)
2006–2007	→ Manchester City (loan)	18	(3)
2007–2010	Rangers	30	(4)
2010–2011	Hannover 96	4	(0)
2011–2014	Puebla	92	(12)
2014–2019	Houston Dynamo	124	(3)
Total		427	(46)

International career
1999	United States U17	6	(1)
2001	United States U20	4	(2)
2001–2017	United States	126	(17)
Medal record
Representing United States
Men's soccer
FIFA Confederations Cup
Runner-up	2009 South Africa
CONCACAF Gold Cup
Winner	2002 United States
Winner	2005 United States
Winner	2007 United States
Winner	2013 United States
Runner-up	2011 United States
Third place	2003 United States–Mexico
CONCACAF Cup
Runner-up	2015 United States
- * Club domestic league appearances and goals as of October 7, 2019

DaMarcus Lamont Beasley (/ˈbiːzli/; born May 24, 1982) is an American former professional soccer player. A left-footed player, Beasley played both as a left winger and left-wing back throughout his career. He retired from soccer after the 2019 MLS Season. On November 26, 2022, National Soccer Hall of Fame announced that he, along with fellow U.S. Men's national teammate Landon Donovan, was selected for induction. He was inducted on May 6, 2023.

After starring at the 1999 FIFA U-17 World Championship, Beasley emerged as a star with the Chicago Fire before making a move to Dutch club PSV Eindhoven in 2004. He later spent time in the Premier League with Manchester City, in the Scottish Premier League for Rangers and in the Bundesliga for Hannover 96. He finished his career with spells with Puebla and Houston Dynamo.

Beasley is the only U.S. man to play in four FIFA World Cups, his first in 2002 and his latest in 2014, earning 126 caps during his 16-year international career.

== Club career ==
=== Early career ===
Born in Fort Wayne, Indiana, Beasley played one year of basketball and two years of soccer at South Side High School. Beasley left South Side after his sophomore year to enroll in the U.S. Soccer Residency Program located at the IMG Academy in Bradenton, Florida where he finished high school. Beasley starred in the 1999 Under-17 World Cup in New Zealand, winning the Silver Ball as the tournament's second best player, behind teammate Landon Donovan.

=== Chicago Fire ===
Beasley signed with MLS on March 16, 1999, and was allocated to the LA Galaxy. However, before making any appearances with LA, he was traded in February 2000 to the Chicago Fire in exchange for first-round picks in the 2000 MLS SuperDraft and 2001 MLS SuperDraft. He would excel with Chicago, scoring 14 goals and recording 20 assists over 4.5 seasons while being named to the league Best XI in 2003. He was close to signing for Southampton FC in 2004, but MLS rejected the offer much to Beasley's displeasure.

His stay with the Fire ended on July 19, 2004, when Dutch giants PSV Eindhoven agreed on a transfer fee with MLS worth $2.5 million. He signed a four-year contract.

=== PSV ===
PSV manager Guus Hiddink brought Beasley in as the successor to Arjen Robben (who went to Chelsea), and because of that, Beasley was granted the number 11 jersey. In his first season in the Eredivisie, Beasley played 29 games, scored 6 goals in 34 domestic games of the Dutch season and helped PSV win their 18th league title. On May 28, 2005, PSV advanced to the final of the 2004–05 KNVB Cup by defeating Feyenoord in a penalty shootout after Beasley's goal in the final minute of regulation tied the match.

In addition to making an impact on the domestic level, Beasley became the first American to play in the semi-finals of the UEFA Champions League, against Milan. In the first leg, PSV lost 2–0 at the San Siro, while in the second leg, PSV won 3–1 at Philips Stadion, though they were eliminated based on the away goals rule. Despite the loss, Beasley was an important player, leading his team with 4 goals in 12 Champions League matches.

DaMarcus was fined €1,500 ($1,852) for driving under the influence of alcohol as a result of an incident on January 16, 2006. His Dutch driving privileges were suspended for the next three months, followed by a three-month probationary period.

=== Manchester City ===
After a disappointing individual season for Beasley in which PSV won their 19th championship, on August 31, 2006, he joined English Premier League side Manchester City on a season-long loan fulfilling his ambition to play in England. However, his first few weeks with City were troubled by injury, limiting his ability to play. On December 30, Beasley scored his first goal for City, a match-winner in the 83rd minute against West Ham United. He went on to score three times more before returning to PSV after making 22 appearances in total.

=== Rangers ===
Scottish Premier League club Rangers signed Beasley for £700,000 in June 2007. He became the second American to play for the Rangers' first team, after Claudio Reyna. On August 4, 2007, Beasley made his Rangers debut, playing a full 90 minutes in a 3–0 win against Inverness Caledonian Thistle. Beasley scored his first goal for the club against FK Zeta in a Champions League qualifier on August 7, 2007, becoming the first American to score for two clubs in the competition. During the match, Beasley was subjected to racial taunting by Zeta fans, along with fellow black teammate, Jean-Claude Darcheville. He urged UEFA and FIFA to do something about the chants, which prompted an investigation intended to crack down on the crowds at soccer matches. Beasley scored his first Scottish Premier League goal in Rangers' 2–1 win over Kilmarnock on August 25, 2007.

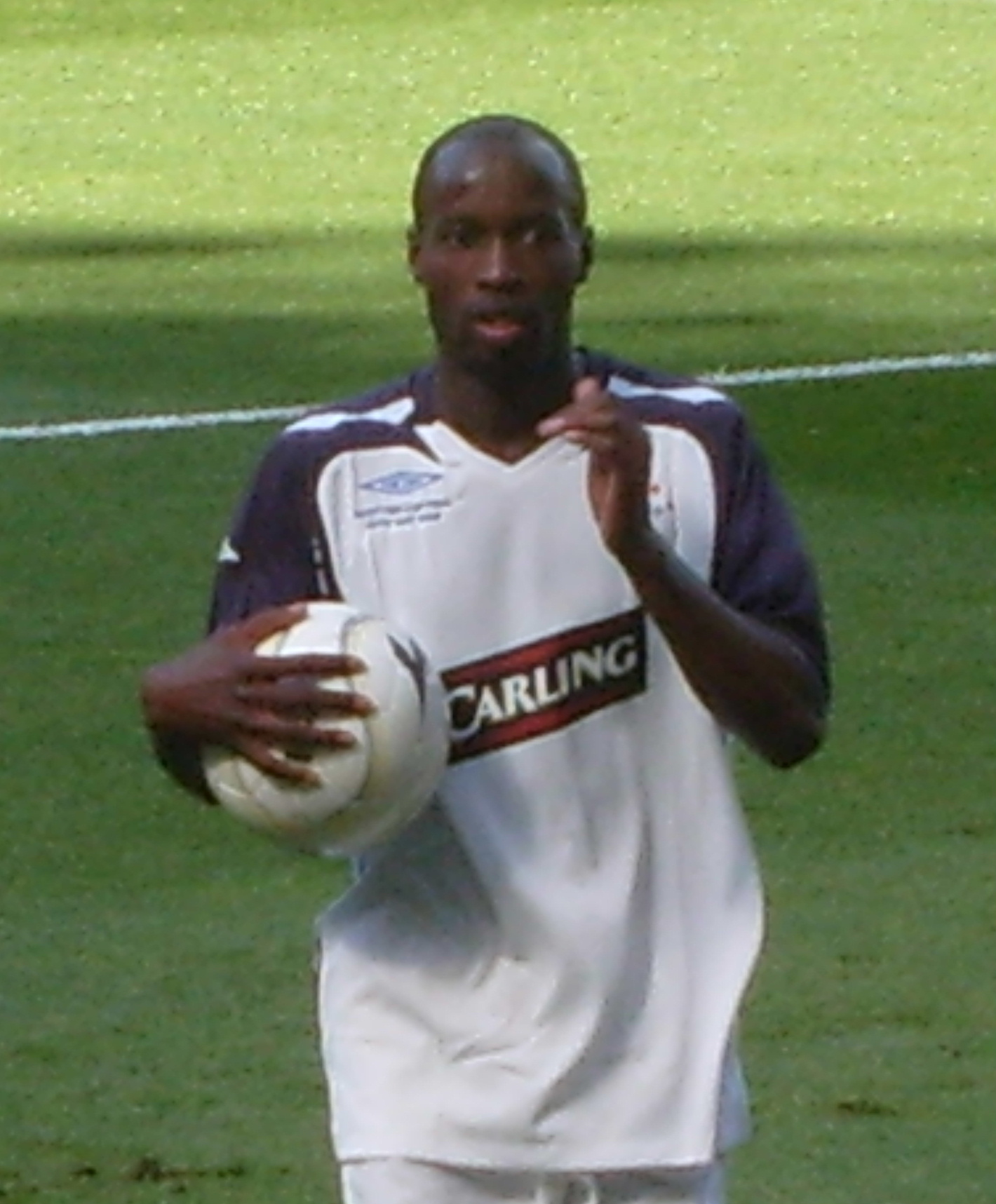
Beasley played a key role in Rangers' Scottish Cup final victory over Queen of the South

On October 2, 2007, Beasley was influential in Rangers 3–0 win against Lyon in the Champions League group stage. He was involved in all three Rangers goals in a victory for the Scottish side. His inswinging corner was headed in by Lee McCulloch to give Rangers a 1–0 advantage. Beasley's wide pass to Alan Hutton allowed him to spring free and set up Daniel Cousin for the second. Finally, Beasley took a 50-meter aerial pass from Cousin while on the run, controlled, and finished. Beasley was named Man of the Match.

During a Champions League match against VfB Stuttgart, Beasley was hurt in a collision with goalkeeper Raphael Schäfer. This left him unable to complete the match and he was substituted. The true extent of the injury meant that he was expected to miss the rest of the Scottish Premier League season. However, Beasley was named in the Rangers squad for the match against Dundee United on May 10. He made his return on May 19 against St Mirren. His first start for Rangers after his injury came in the Scottish Cup final against Queen of the South; he notched a goal and an assist in the 3–2 victory.

On August 23, 2008, in a Scottish Premier League match against Aberdeen at Pittodrie Stadium, Beasley looked to have scored his first goal of the campaign, though the goal was wrongly ruled out for offside. Beasley helped Rangers win the SPL title for 2008–09, being awarded a championship medal after appearing in ten league matches during the season.

During the 2009–10 season, Beasley saw little playing time with Rangers. He stated in December 2009 that he would seek a move away from the club during the upcoming January transfer window in order to secure a place in the United States squad for the 2010 FIFA World Cup. Shortly after this declaration, Beasley was given a run of games in the Rangers team during the month of December. He had some impressive performances, scoring in games against Dundee United and Motherwell. After the Motherwell game Beasley expressed his desire to stay with Rangers and help them retain the Scottish Premier League title. Although Rangers won the title, Beasley was not entitled to a championship medal, having played in only eight games, less than the 25% required.

=== Hannover 96 ===
On August 30, 2010, Beasley signed a two-year contract with German Bundesliga club Hannover 96. He made his debut on September 18, 2010, coming on as a substitute in the 77th minute in a 2–0 away loss to VfL Wolfsburg.

=== Puebla ===
On June 22, 2011, Beasley joined Mexican Primera División side Puebla. Beasley scored his first goal for Puebla in his unofficial debut against Monterrey in the Copa Tijuana. On July 23, Beasley made his competitive debut for Los Camoteros in a 1–0 win over Atlas in the opening match of the 2011 Apertura Season. He scored his first competitive goal for Puebla on August 21 in a 2–1 win over Pumas UNAM.

=== Houston Dynamo ===
On July 23, 2014, Beasley joined Major League Soccer club Houston Dynamo as a designated player. He made his Dynamo debut on August 3, 2014, starting at left back against DC United in a 1–0 win. Beasley suffered a hamstring injury on October 12 that ended his 2014 season. He appeared in 10 games for the Dynamo in his first year with Houston.

In 2015, Beasley was selected for his 4th MLS All Star game and was named the Dynamo team defender of the year. He scored his first goal for the Dynamo on August 8, 2015, in a 2–1 against the San Jose Earthquakes.

2016 saw Beasley miss over a month due to knee surgery. After the season Beasley re-signed with the Dynamo, however he took a pay cut and no longer counted as a designated player.

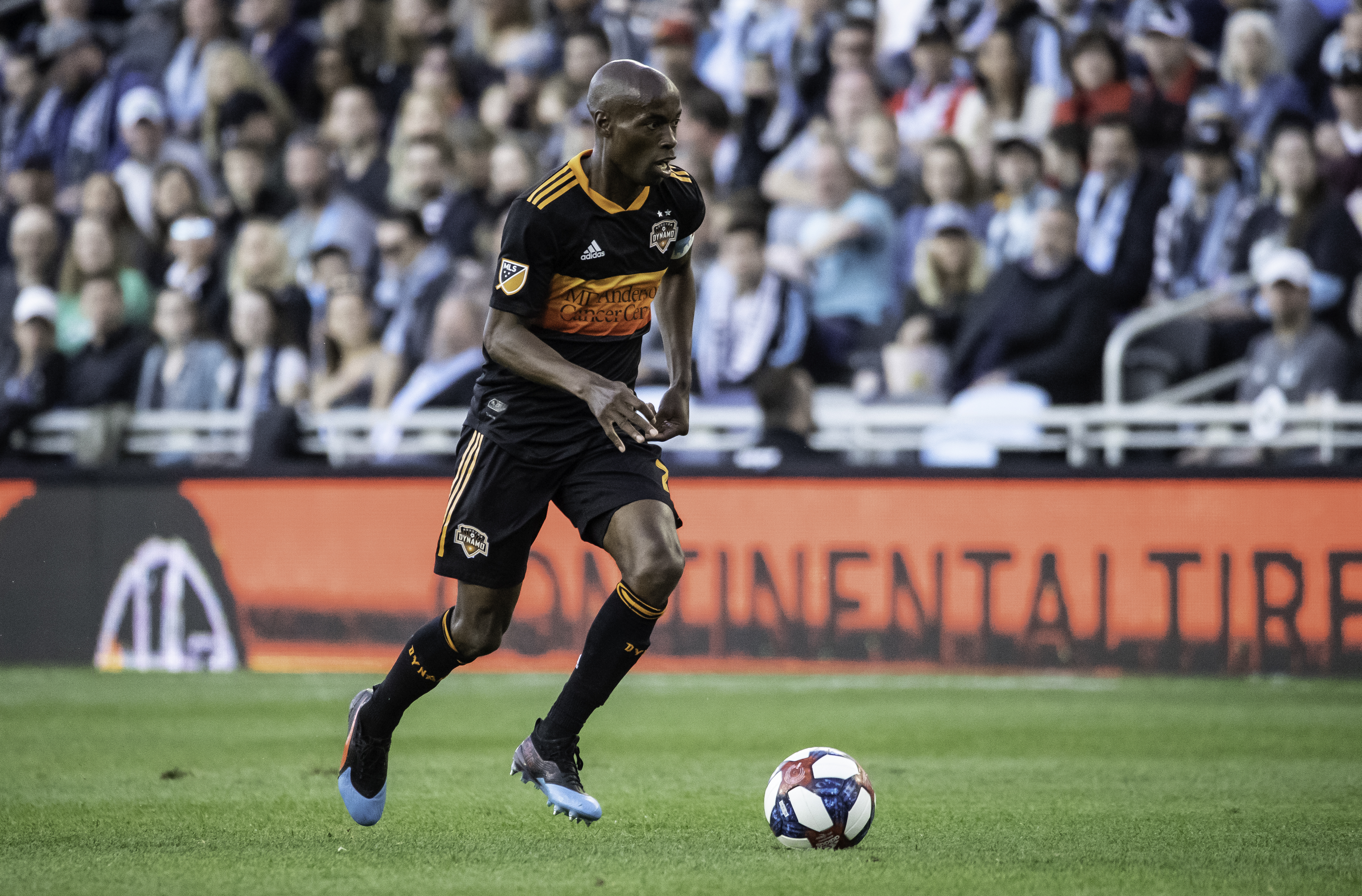
Beasley playing for Houston in 2019

Beasley didn't miss significant time because of injury in 2017 and had a strong season, being named an MLS All Star and helping lead the Dynamo make the MLS Playoffs for the first time in 3 seasons. He received the MLS Fair Play Individual Award, which is given to the player who commits the fewest fouls and demonstrates good sportsmanship.

In 2018, Beasley and the Dynamo missed out on the playoffs, but did win the US Open Cup, which qualified them for the 2019 CONCACAF Champions League. the first time the Dynamo had qualified for the competition since 2013. On December 30, 2018, Beasley signed a new contract to bring him back for the 2019 season.

On February 19, Beasley and the Dynamo opened the 2019 season with a Champions League match against Guastatoya. Beasley scored the only goal of the match hitting a weak foot volley from outside the box to give the Dynamo the win. On March 12, Beasley came off injured in a CCL match against Tigres. He underwent surgery on his knee on March 20 and was out for almost 2 months. Beasley returned from the injury and made his first MLS appearance of the season on May 15 in a 1–0 loss to the Portland Timbers. On May 20, Beasley announced that he would be retiring after the 2019 season. Beasley would make 18 appearances across all competitions in 2019, his last coming on October 6 as the Dynamo defeated the LA Galaxy 4–2 in the final game of the season and Beasley's career. Beasley was subbed off in the 89th minute to a standing ovation from the crowd. After the match the Dynamo showed a tribute on the videoboard and Beasley addressed the crowd, saying "I wouldn't think of another club to end my career with. Houston is my home. I'm not gonna say goodbye."

== International career ==
Beasley was capped over 100 times for the United States national team, participating in four FIFA World Cups. He was also a key part of the United States team that won the CONCACAF Gold Cup in 2002, 2005, 2007, 2013, & 2017 as a viewer. For the 2013 Gold Cup, Beasley was the team's captain.

Beasley played for the Under-20 team at the 2001 FIFA World Youth Championship in Argentina. He received his first senior cap on January 27, 2001, age 18, against China. At age 20, he was named in the United States' squad for the 2002 World Cup in Japan and South Korea, playing in all three group matches as the team achieved its best performance in over half a century by reaching the quarter-finals.

Beasley, along with fellow young midfielder Landon Donovan, was criticized by fans and U.S. coach Bruce Arena for poor play during the 2006 World Cup. He set up the U.S.'s only goal (scored by Clint Dempsey) against Ghana and had a potential game-winning goal disallowed against Italy when Brian McBride was adjudged to be screening Gianluigi Buffon in an offside position.

In a 2010 World Cup qualification fourth-round game against Trinidad and Tobago, Beasley played the full 90 minutes at left back. Beasley remarked that this was the first time in his career he had played an entire game at the position.

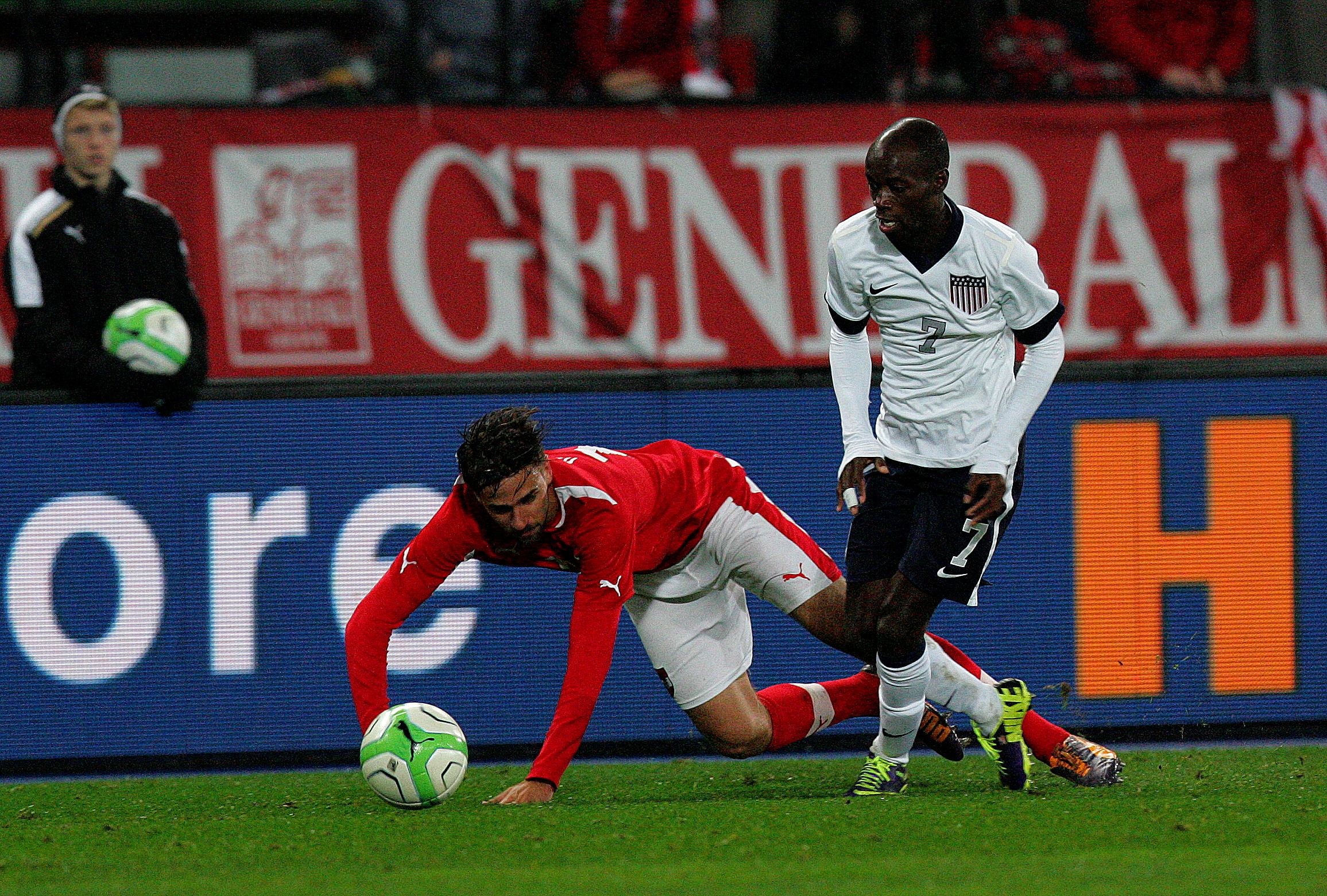
Beasley earned 125 caps for the U.S. national team and is the only player to represent them at four FIFA World Cups

As Beasley struggled with injuries and playing time at Rangers, he saw his national team form drop considerably. During the second match of the 2009 FIFA Confederations Cup, against Brazil, Beasley lost the ball on a short corner kick, creating a Brazil counter-attack that resulted in a goal. He was substituted shortly after and did not make an appearance for the rest of the tournament.

Beasley was named by U.S. coach Bob Bradley to the nation's 23-man roster for the 2010 World Cup, but made only one substitute appearance in a group stage match, against Algeria. After making four substitute appearances in the next two and a half years, Beasley was called for up 2014 World Cup qualifiers in March 2013. He started at left back and received strong reviews in a victories over Costa Rica, Jamaica, Panama, and a draw against Mexico. In July 2013, United States national team manager Jürgen Klinsmann named Beasley captain for the 2013 CONCACAF Gold Cup, where he started at left-back for five of the six matches the U.S. played. The U.S. won the tournament.

With his inclusion in the United States' 2014 World Cup squad, Beasley joined Claudio Reyna and Kasey Keller as the only American players to be a member of four World Cup squads. By appearing against Ghana in the team's opening match of the tournament, he became the first player to play in four World Cup tournaments for the United States. He played all four matches for the United States, including a match against Belgium in the round of 16.

Beasley announced his retirement from the national team on December 15, 2014. However, he returned to the national team for the 2015 Gold Cup at the request of United States coach Jürgen Klinsmann. He only made one appearance in the competition, playing only in the third-place play-off match against Panama. He entered the game in extra time and missed the last penalty. With a start at left-wing back in a June 2017 World Cup qualifier at Mexico, Beasley became the first American to play in five World Cup qualifying cycles.

== Personal life ==
Beasley's older brother Jamar was a member of the Cedar Rapids Rampage, United States national futsal team, and former player in MLS and for the US under-20 team. DaMarcus and Jamar got involved with soccer as children due to their father wanting them to be involved in sports. He also played football and basketball as a child. He has also launched a jewelry collection in collaboration with The Diamond Studio, a Scottish jewelry suite. On February 1, 2010, Beasley's car was firebombed in front of his house in Glasgow.

On October 28, 2020, Fort Wayne FC announced Beasley's addition to their ownership group as co-owner of the club. The teams has announced plans to self-promoted from USL League Two to USL League One beginning in the 2023 season.

== Career statistics ==
=== Club ===
Appearances and goals by club, season and competition
Club	Season	League			Cup (Note: Appearances in the U.S. Open Cup, KNVB Cup, FA Cup, Scottish Cup, and Copa MX)		Continental		Other		Total	
Club	Season	Division	Apps	Goals	Apps	Goals	Apps	Goals	Apps	Goals	Apps	Goals
Chicago Fire	2000	MLS	18	2	5	0	—		7 (Note: Appearances in the MLS Cup playoffs)	0	30	2
Chicago Fire	2001	MLS	24	2	3	0	—		3	1	30	3
Chicago Fire	2002	MLS	19	3	1	0	—		3	0	23	3
Chicago Fire	2003	MLS	22	7	4	2	—		4	1	30	10
Chicago Fire	2004	MLS	15	0	0	0	4 (Note: Appearances in the CONCACAF Champions Cup)	0	0	0	19	0
Chicago Fire	Total		98	14	13	2	4	0	17	2	132	18
PSV Eindhoven	2004–05	Eredivisie	29	6	1	1	12 (Note: Appearances in the UEFA Champions League)	4	—		42	11
PSV Eindhoven	2005–06	Eredivisie	27	4	1	0	5	0	—		33	4
PSV Eindhoven	Total		56	10	2	1	17	4	0	0	75	15
Manchester City	2006–07	Premier League	18	3	4	1	—		—		22	4
Rangers	2007–08	Scottish Premier League	11	2	1	1	8	2	1 (Note: Appearances in the Scottish League Cup)	0	21	5
Rangers	2008–09	Scottish Premier League	10	0	1	0	0	0	1	0	12	0
Rangers	2009–10	Scottish Premier League	9	2	2	0	2	0	1	0	14	2
Rangers	Total		30	4	4	1	10	2	3	0	47	7
Hannover 96	2010–11	Bundesliga	4	0	0	0	—		—		4	0
Puebla	2011–12	Primera División/Liga MX	33	7	0	0	—		—		33	7
Puebla	2012–13	Primera División/Liga MX	31	4	5	1	—		—		36	5
Puebla	2013–14	Primera División/Liga MX	28	1	2	0	—		—		30	2
Puebla	Total		92	12	7	1	0	0	0	0	99	13
Houston Dynamo	2014	MLS	10	0	0	0	—		—		10	0
Houston Dynamo	2015	MLS	28	1	0	0	—		—		28	1
Houston Dynamo	2016	MLS	24	1	1	0	—		—		25	1
Houston Dynamo	2017	MLS	24	0	0	0	—		4	0	28	0
Houston Dynamo	2018	MLS	26	1	2	0	—		—		28	1
Houston Dynamo	2019	MLS	12	0	1	0	5 (Note: Four appearances and one goal in the CONCACAF Champions League, one appearance and goal in the Leagues Cup)	2	—		18	2
Houston Dynamo	Total		124	3	4	0	5	2	4	0	137	5
Career total			422	46	34	6	36	8	24	2	516	65

=== International ===
Appearances and goals by national team and year
National team	Year	Apps	Goals
United States	2001	3	0
United States	2002	12	3
United States	2003	12	1
United States	2004	14	4
United States	2005	13	4
United States	2006	7	0
United States	2007	11	3
United States	2008	10	2
United States	2009	7	0
United States	2010	4	0
United States	2011	3	0
United States	2012	1	0
United States	2013	17	0
United States	2014	7	0
United States	2015	2	0
United States	2016	0	0
United States	2017	3	0
Total		126	17

Scores and results list the United States' goal tally first, score column indicates score after each Beasley goal.

List of international goals scored by DaMarcus Beasley
No.	Date	Venue	Opponent	Score	Result	Competition
1	January 19, 2002	Pasadena, California, United States	South Korea	2–1	2–1	2002 CONCACAF Gold Cup
2	May 12, 2002	Washington, D.C., United States	Uruguay	2–0	2–1	Friendly
3	May 16, 2002	East Rutherford, New Jersey, United States	Jamaica	5–0	5–0	Friendly
4	June 19, 2003	St. Étienne, France	Turkey	1–0	1–2	2003 FIFA Confederations Cup
5	March 31, 2004	Płock, Poland	Poland	1–0	1–0	Friendly
6	June 13, 2004	Columbus, Ohio, United States	Grenada	1–0	3–0	2006 FIFA World Cup qualification
7	June 13, 2004	Columbus, Ohio, United States	Grenada	2–0	3–0	2006 FIFA World Cup qualification
8	June 20, 2004	St. George's, Grenada	Grenada	3–1	3–2	2006 FIFA World Cup qualification
9	July 5, 2005	Seattle, Washington, United States	Cuba	3–1	4–1	2005 CONCACAF Gold Cup
10	July 16, 2005	Foxboro, Massachusetts, United States	Jamaica	2–0	3–1	2005 CONCACAF Gold Cup
11	July 16, 2005	Foxboro, Massachusetts, United States	Jamaica	3–0	3–1	2005 CONCACAF Gold Cup
12	September 3, 2005	Columbus, Ohio, United States	Mexico	2–0	2–0	2006 FIFA World Cup qualification
13	June 2, 2007	San Jose, California, United States	China	1–0	4–1	Friendly
14	June 12, 2007	Foxboro, Massachusetts, United States	El Salvador	1–0	4–0	2007 CONCACAF Gold Cup
15	June 12, 2007	Foxboro, Massachusetts, United States	El Salvador	4–0	4–0	2007 CONCACAF Gold Cup
16	October 11, 2008	Washington, D.C., United States	Cuba	1–0	6–1	FIFA World Cup 2010 qualifying
17	October 11, 2008	Washington, D.C., United States	Cuba	2–0	6–1	FIFA World Cup 2010 qualifying

== Honours ==
Chicago Fire

- Supporters' Shield: 2003
- U.S. Open Cup: 2000, 2003

PSV Eindhoven

- Eredivisie: 2004–05, 2005–06
- KNVB Cup: 2004–05

Rangers

- Scottish Premier League: 2008–09, 2009–10
- Scottish League Cup: 2007–08, 2009–10
- Scottish Cup: 2007–08, 2008–09

Houston Dynamo

- U.S. Open Cup: 2018

United States

- FIFA Confederations Cup runner-up: 2009
- CONCACAF Gold Cup: 2002, 2005, 2007, 2013

Individual

- FIFA U-17 World Cup Silver Ball: 1999
- MLS All-Star: 2001, 2002, 2003, 2015, 2017
- MLS Best XI: 2003
- CONCACAF Gold Cup Golden Boot: 2005
- CONCACAF Gold Cup Team of the Tournament: 2005; Honorable Mention: 2007
- Houston Dynamo Defensive Player of the Year: 2015, 2018
- MLS Fair Play Award: 2017
- Dynamo Players' Player of the Year: 2019
- National Soccer Hall of Fame: 2023

== See also ==
- List of men's footballers with 100 or more international caps
