= Taylor Hunter =

American soccer player (born 1993)

Personal information
- Date of birth: July 7, 1993 (age 33)
- Place of birth: Aurora, Colorado, United States
- Height: 1.83 m (6 ft 0 in)
- Position: Defender

Youth career
- 2009–2011: Real Colorado
- 2011–2014: Denver Pioneers

Senior career*
Years	Team	Apps	(Gls)
2015	Houston Dynamo	1	(0)
2015	→ Colorado Springs Switchbacks (loan)	14	(1)
2016	Rio Grande Valley FC	20	(0)
2017	Houston Dynamo	0	(0)
2017	→ Rio Grande Valley FC (loan)	23	(0)
2018	Colorado Springs Switchbacks	33	(1)
- * Club domestic league appearances and goals as of 09:04, 16 October 2018 (UTC)

Taylor Hunter (born July 7, 1993) is an American soccer player.

== Career ==
=== Youth and college ===
Hunter played youth soccer for Real Colorado before spending his entire college career at the University of Denver. He made a total of 69 appearances for the Pioneers and was named CoSIDA Academic All-District 7 First Team three consecutive years.

=== Professional ===
On January 20, 2015, Hunter was selected in the third round (49th overall) of the 2015 MLS SuperDraft by the Houston Dynamo and signed a professional contract with the club a month later. On April 11, Hunter was sent on loan to USL club Colorado Springs Switchbacks FC. He made his professional debut that same day in a 1–0 victory over Real Monarchs SLC. He scored his first league goal for the club on 24 June 2015 in a 5–0 home victory over Orange County SC. His goal, the fourth of the match, came in the 59th minute.

Hunter joined United Soccer League side Rio Grande Valley FC Toros for their 2016 season. He made his league debut for the club on 26 March 2016 in a 2–0 away loss against Tulsa Roughnecks FC. He returned to Houston Dynamo on March 1, 2017.
