= Leonel Miranda =

Argentine footballer (born 1994)

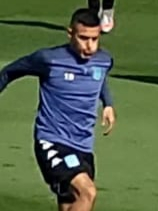

Personal information
- Full name: Leonel Ariel Miranda
- Date of birth: 7 January 1994 (age 32)
- Place of birth: Avellaneda, Argentina
- Height: 1.73 m (5 ft 8 in)
- Position: Midfielder

Team information
- Current team: San Telmo
- Number: 17

Youth career
- Independiente

Senior career*
Years	Team	Apps	(Gls)
2012–2016	Independiente	34	(2)
2015–2016	→ Houston Dynamo (loan)	32	(3)
2016–2019	Defensa y Justicia	72	(3)
2019–2020	Club Tijuana	17	(3)
2020	→ Racing Club (loan)	7	(1)
2020–2024	Racing Club	85	(4)
2024–2025	Tigre	4	(0)
2025	Banfield	5	(0)
2025–	San Telmo	8	(0)
- * Club domestic league appearances and goals as of 17:43, 7 October 2025 (UTC)

Leonel Ariel Miranda (born 7 January 1994 in Avellaneda, Argentina) is an Argentine professional footballer who currently plays as a midfielder for San Telmo.

== Career ==
=== Independiente ===
Miranda signed with Independiente in October 2012. He made his debut with the seven-time Copa Libertadores champions in March 2013 and made 34 appearances for the club scoring 2 goals.

On 8 January 2015 it was announced that Miranda would join Major League Soccer club Houston Dynamo on loan through to the end of the 2015 MLS season. The loan was extended for the 2016 MLS season on 30 January 2016.

=== Defensa y Justicia ===
Defensa y Justicia revealed the signing of Leonel Miranda through its social media accounts on Monday, July 25, 2016, publishing a photo of Miranda putting pen to paper.

=== Racing Club ===
In January 2020, Miranda joined Racing Club de Avellaneda on a six-months loan from Club Tijuana, with an option to buy for around 3 million dollars. After five league appearances, the buying option was automatically triggered.

== Honours ==
Racing Club

- Trofeo de Campeones de la Liga Profesional: 2022
