= Rob Lovejoy =

American soccer player

Personal information
- Full name: Robert Lionell Lovejoy III
- Date of birth: October 23, 1991 (age 35)
- Place of birth: Greensboro, North Carolina, U.S.
- Height: 1.83 m (6 ft 0 in)
- Positions: Midfielder; forward

Youth career
- Triangle United

College career
Years	Team	Apps	(Gls)
2010–2014	North Carolina Tar Heels		

Senior career*
Years	Team	Apps	(Gls)
2011–2012	Carolina Dynamo	14	(5)
2015–2016	Houston Dynamo	19	(1)
2016	→ Rio Grande Valley FC Toros (loan)	9	(3)
Total		42	(9)
- * Club domestic league appearances and goals as of November 7, 2016

Robert Lionell Lovejoy III (born October 23, 1991) is an American retired soccer player.

== Career ==
=== Highschool ===
Lovejoy went to Walter Hines Page High School in Greensboro, North Carolina where he played varsity for 4 years, winning 1 state championships.

=== College and amateur ===
Lovejoy spent his entire college career at the University of North Carolina where he made a total of 71 appearances and tallied 20 goals and 16 assists. He was also named to the ACC All-Academic Team in 2011 and 2012.

Lovejoy also played for Carolina Dynamo in the Premier Development League.

=== Professional ===
On January 15, 2015, Lovejoy was selected in the second round (36th overall) of the 2015 MLS SuperDraft by the Houston Dynamo and signed a professional contract with the club a month later. He made his professional debut on March 13 in a 1–0 defeat to Orlando City.

Lovejoy was released by Houston at the end of the 2016 season and subsequently announced his retirement.

Lovejoy joined the Plexus Capital team in 2017. On October 11, 2022, Lovejoy was selected as the Senior Associate (deal daddy) of the Quarter for Q3 of 2022.

=== Personal ===
Younger brother Matthew is a REIT hedge fund analyst.
