= 2011 Portland Timbers season =

Portland Timbers
2011 season
- President: Merritt Paulson
- Head coach: John Spencer
- Stadium: Jeld-Wen Field; Portland, Oregon (Capacity: 18,627); Merlo Field (1 game); Portland, Oregon (Capacity: 4,892)
- Major League Soccer: Conference: 6th Overall: 12th
- MLS Cup Playoffs: Did not qualify
- U.S. Open Cup: Qualification semifinals
- Cascadia Cup: 2nd
- Top goalscorer: League: Kenny Cooper (8 goals); All: Kenny Cooper; Jack Jewsbury (8 goals)
- Highest home attendance: 20,323 vs. NE (Sep 16) vs. HOU (Oct 14)
- Lowest home attendance: League: 18,627 (15 times); All: 5,061 (Merlo Field) vs. CHV (Mar 29)
- Average home league attendance: League: 18,827; All: 17,711
Primary colors	Secondary colors

The 2011 Portland Timbers season was the debut season for the Portland Timbers in Major League Soccer (MLS), the top flight professional soccer league in the United States and Canada. As the fourth incarnation of a professional soccer club to bear the Portland Timbers name, the MLS version of the Timbers began the 25th season in club history with three games on the road due to ongoing renovations to Jeld-Wen Field.

The club's first game was played at Dick's Sporting Goods Park versus Colorado Rapids on March 19, which the Timbers lost 3–1. The first MLS match in Portland was on April 14 when the Timbers bested the Chicago Fire by a scoreline of 4–2 in front of a sold-out crowd of 18,627 at newly renovated Jeld-Wen Field.

== Season review ==
=== March ===
The Timbers came into their first MLS game nursing injuries to several players including expected starters Darlington Nagbe, Sal Zizzo and Troy Perkins as well as Bright Dike and Eddie Johnson.

The defending champions Colorado Rapids took the field with the same 11 players which had started MLS Cup 2010 and dealt the Timbers an early blow with an 8th-minute goal by Jeff Larentowicz. The Rapids scored two more first half goals in rapid succession to put Portland down 3–0 at halftime. Timbers forward Kenny Cooper scored the first ever MLS goal for Portland from a free kick in the 80th minute but it was not enough as the Timbers lost their inaugural game 3–1. The Timbers Army — an independent supporters group for the Portland Timbers – sent over 400 members to Dick's Sporting Goods Park for the game, a record for away support in Colorado.

Prior to the March 26 game versus Toronto FC, it was announced that defender Mamadou Danso had been called up for Gambia and would miss the match. Portland would also be without Nagbe, Perkins, Dike and Johnson because of injuries while Zizzo returned after recovering from a separated shoulder.

Toronto opened the scoring in the 14th minute through Javier Martina. Backup goalkeeper Adin Brown suffered a strained hamstring in the first half and was replaced by Jake Gleeson at halftime. Gleeson made 3 saves during the game, including one which earned the young goalkeeper MLS Save of the Week honors, but Martina found the back of the net again in the 70th minute to put the game beyond reach as the Timbers lost 2–0. Midfielder Sal Zizzo came on as a second-half substitute for Portland but reinjured his shoulder and was expected to be out two more weeks.

Unlike previous years when second division Portland sides were often guaranteed a spot in the U.S. Open Cup, the Timbers would have to defeat three other MLS teams in a qualification tournament in order to join the competition. The Timbers began their campaign to qualify for the 2011 U.S. Open Cup on March 29 as the team played their first game in Portland versus Chivas USA. Due to ongoing renovations at Jeld-Wen Field, Portland hosted the game at Merlo Field on the campus of the University of Portland. Injuries to their starting and backup goalkeepers forced the Timbers to add Kevin Guppy to the squad from the league-wide MLS Goalkeeper Pool as an emergency backup to Gleeson.

A sell-out crowd of 5,061 were on hand as the MLS version of the Timbers made their debut in Portland. Chivas USA were reduced to 10 men after Andrew Boyens was shown a second yellow card late in the first half. It took nearly the entire second half for the Timbers to capitalize on the man advantage as substitute Jack Jewsbury finally gave Portland the lead with a long-range strike in the 84th minute. Captain for the night, Eric Brunner, sealed a first-ever competitive win for the Timbers with a headed goal two minutes later as Portland won 2–0 to advance to the semifinals of the qualification tournament versus the San Jose Earthquakes.

=== April ===
Hoping to build on their positive result in Portland, the Timbers started the league game against the New England Revolution with the same 11 players which were on the field at the conclusion of the U.S. Open Cup qualification win versus Chivas USA. Both Eddie Johnson and rookie Darlington Nagbe recovered from their injuries and were available on the bench. The Timbers again fell behind to an early goal but were able to equalize just before the end of the first half through captain Jack Jewsbury. Portland held on for the 1–1 draw to gain the club's first ever point in Major League Soccer. Nagbe made his Timbers debut in the 66th minute, coming on for Jeremy Hall.

On April 7, one week before the Timbers home opener at Jeld-Wen Field, starting center back David Horst suffered an ankle injury during practice and was expected to miss several weeks. The next day it was announced that the Timbers would host the U.S. Open Cup qualification semifinal match vs. San Jose Earthquakes at Jeld-Wen Field on May 3. San Jose originally won hosting rights for the game through a preseason coin toss but was unable to secure a venue in time.

Portland recorded another club first on April 13 when the Timbers signed their first ever Designated Player, Diego Chará. The 25-year-old Colombian midfielder, who was a childhood friend and recent teammate of Jorge Perlaza at Deportes Tolima, was expected to join the Timbers after acquiring his P-1 visa. It was later revealed, when the players union released salary figures for all MLS players, that Chará's salary was well below the level usually associated with Designated Players and his designation as such was due to the transfer fee paid by the Timbers to Tolima.

Chicago Fire were the Timbers opponents for the first ever MLS game in Portland on April 14. Fans lined up outside Jeld-Wen Field hours before kickoff in a steady downpour that would last throughout the night. Prior to kickoff, the Timbers Army sang the national anthem en masse while accompanied by fireworks and subsequently revealed a large tifo display celebrating the city of Portland.

A boisterous sell-out crowd of 18,627 watched as Jorge Perlaza scored his first goal for the Timbers in the 29th minute to give Portland their first lead of the season. Less than 10 minutes later, the Timbers were up 2–0 after a long-range goal from defender Rodney Wallace. The dream start to Portland's home opener continued just after halftime when Perlaza pounced on a spilled rebound by Fire goalkeeper Sean Johnson to give the Timbers a 3–0 lead. Chicago attempted to stage a comeback after a 65th minute own goal by Eric Brunner and an AT&T Goal of the Week nominee blast by Marco Pappa in the 80th minute brought the Fire to within a single goal of the Timbers. Portland put the game beyond reach after a goal mouth scramble in the 84th minute restored the Timbers two-goal lead thanks to an own goal by Chicago defender Dasan Robinson. Portland held on for the 4–2 win, the club's first in league play.

The Timbers were back in Jeld-Wen Field three days later as they hosted FC Dallas in front of a second consecutive sell-out crowd. Just as in the game versus Chicago, Portland jumped out to a 2–0 first half lead thanks to goals from Jewsbury and Kenny Cooper then extended the lead to 3–0 early in the second half when Kalif Alhassan dribbled past four Dallas defenders to find Wallace who steered the ball into the back of the net for his second goal in as many games. In a scene which was to be repeated throughout the season, the Timbers gave up two goals late in the game to put the victory in jeopardy. However, Portland held on for the 3–2 win to remain perfect at home in MLS play.

== Background ==
=== November 2010 ===
The building of the MLS Timbers began in earnest upon the completion of the 2010 MLS season on November 21, 2010. The very next day the club acquired midfielder/defender Jeremy Hall from New York Red Bulls in exchange for a third-round pick in the January SuperDraft and also traded allocation money to Los Angeles Galaxy in exchange for use of an international roster spot in the 2011 and 2012 seasons.

Two days after that, on November 24, 2010, the league conducted the 2010 MLS Expansion Draft which allowed both the Timbers and expansion cousins Vancouver Whitecaps to choose ten players each from those unprotected by their existing clubs. Portland drafted some players to keep, some players to trade, and some players to wait on in the future. In the expansion draft, the Timbers selected and kept five players: defender Eric Brunner (from Columbus Crew), midfielder Adam Moffat (Columbus), defender David Horst (Real Salt Lake), midfielder Peter Lowry (Chicago Fire), and defender Jordan Graye (D.C. United).

The club selected and immediately traded three players: midfielder Dax McCarty (selected from FC Dallas, traded to D.C. United), defender Anthony Wallace (selected from and traded back to Colorado Rapids), and midfielder Arturo Alvarez (selected from San Jose Earthquakes, traded to Real Salt Lake). McCarty was traded for defender Rodney Wallace and a 4th round SuperDraft pick; Wallace was traded for allocation money; and Alvarez was traded for a 2nd round SuperDraft pick.

The Timbers used their other two expansion picks to select the rights of players leaving MLS: forward Robbie Findley and defender Jonathan Bornstein. Both players' contracts were to expire on December 31, 2010. Bornstein had already signed a contract with Mexican side Tigres while Findley had broadly announced his intention to seek a contract in Europe, which he later found with English club Nottingham Forest. Portland drafted these players to hold their rights should they return to MLS.

=== December 2010 ===
The club continued shaping its roster in December. On December 13, Portland traded defender Jordan Graye to Houston Dynamo in exchange for a 2014 4th round SuperDraft pick. Four days later, the Timbers traded goalkeeper Steve Cronin and allocation money to D.C. United in exchange for goalkeeper Troy Perkins and salary considerations.

=== January ===
At the January 13, 2011 SuperDraft, the club selected Generation adidas forward Darlington Nagbe in round one and defender Chris Taylor in round two. The club also made two trades on draft day. The first saw Portland acquire the No. 11 pick in the draft and use of an international roster spot for the 2011 season from Seattle Sounders FC in exchange for the No. 20 pick and allocation money. Portland then traded the newly acquired No. 11 pick to Houston Dynamo in exchange for allocation money. The club was more than happy with its draft day results. "We get the international slot for a year and ultimately, through the deals, we're banking some allocation money," said Portland general manager and technical director Gavin Wilkinson. "So, the way we walk out of it, at the end of that, we're lucky to get the player we absolutely loved [Darlington Nagbe, chosen 2nd overall by Portland] and an international spot, which is needed in the way that we're trying to build this squad. ... We think it was a win-win."

The following week, Portland selected forward Spencer Thompson, midfielder Robby Lynch, forward Raymundo Reza, and defender Taylor Mueller in the 2011 Supplemental Draft. Of all the draft choices, only Nagbe was immediately added to the club's roster as he had already signed a contract with Major League Soccer. Taylor, Thompson, Lynch, Reza, and Mueller are not guaranteed contracts and must earn a spot on the club's final roster.

On January 17, the club entered the international transfer market and acquired forward Kenny Cooper from Bundesliga 2 side 1860 Munich for an undisclosed fee. Portland used its No. 2 position in the MLS Allocation Ranking to acquire the MLS rights to Cooper.

The Timbers announced the signings of goalkeeper Adin Brown and defender Steve Purdy — both members of the USL Portland Timbers — on January 26.

== Preseason ==
Win Tie Loss

=== California training camp ===
February 4, 2011	Ventura County Fusion (PDL)	1–1	Portland Timbers	Ventura, California
19:00 PST	Vaca 17'	Report	47' Nagbe	Stadium: Ventura College

February 8, 2011	Los Angeles Galaxy	1–1	Portland Timbers	Carson, California
15:00 PST	López (red card) 26'; Cardozo 47'	Report	50' Umony	Stadium: The Home Depot Center

The Timbers began training camp in Ventura, California with their first practice on February 2. During the first preseason game against Ventura County Fusion on February 4, first round draft pick Darlington Nagbe scored in the second half to earn Portland a 1–1 draw. Forward Bright Dike sustained an Achilles tendon injury during the game and was expected to miss 6 to 9 months.

Portland faced their first MLS opposition on February 8 in a training match versus Los Angeles Galaxy. Newly acquired Los Angeles midfielder Miguel Pedro López was shown a red card in the first half but the Galaxy were allowed to replace him due to the nature of the match. The Timbers again relied on a second half equalizing goal – this time by trialist Brian Umony — to earn their second consecutive 1–1 draw.

=== Arizona training camp ===
February 19, 2011	Houston Dynamo	0–0	Portland Timbers	Casa Grande, Arizona
10:00 PST		Report		Stadium: Grande Sports World

February 23, 2011	Montreal Impact (NASL)	0–1	Portland Timbers	Casa Grande, Arizona
15:00 PST		Report	7' Johnson	Stadium: Grande Sports World

February 26, 2011	Sporting Kansas City	0–0	Portland Timbers	Casa Grande, Arizona
10:30 PST		Report		Stadium: Grande Sports World

Just prior to leaving for training camp at Grande Sports World in Casa Grande, Arizona the Timbers announced that they had acquired midfielder Sal Zizzo from Chivas USA in exchange for allocation money and had signed two players from the undefeated 2010 Portland Timbers U-23 squad, Freddie Braun and Jake Gleeson.

Portland faced off against the Houston Dynamo on February 19 in a match that was halted in the 80th minute due to poor conditions. New signings Zizzo and Kenny Cooper made their debuts in the 0–0 draw. Due to the inclement weather, a scrimmage versus the United States U-18 men's national team scheduled for later the same day was cancelled.

The second training match in Arizona took place on February 23 against NASL side Montreal Impact. The Timbers held on for a 1–0 win – their first of the preseason – thanks to a 7th minute headed goal from forward Eddie Johnson.

On February 25, Portland introduced five former players and coaches from previous Portland Timbers squads as Alumni Ambassadors. John Bain (player, NASL Portland Timbers; head coach, WSA/APSL Portland Timbers), Bernie Fagan (player, NASL Portland Timbers; head coach, WSA/APSL Portland Timbers), Lee Morrison (player, USL Portland Timbers), Mick Hoban (player, NASL Portland Timbers) and Jim Brazeau (goalkeeper coach, USL Portland Timbers) joined previously announced Community Ambassador Scot Thompson (player, USL Portland Timbers) in an official capacity to represent the Timbers at community events and speaking engagements.

In their final preseason game in Arizona, the Timbers came away with another 0–0 draw versus Sporting Kansas City. Future Portland captain Jack Jewsbury came on as a 63rd-minute substitute for Kansas City in the match.

=== Cascadia Summit ===
March 4, 2011	Seattle Sounders FC	0–2	Portland Timbers	Tukwila, Washington
19:30 PST		Report	21' Perlaza; 90+3' Cooper	Stadium: Starfire Sports Complex; Attendance: 3,100; Referee: Dave Gantar (CAN)

March 5, 2011	Vancouver Whitecaps FC	1–1	Portland Timbers	Tukwila, Washington
16:00 PST	Horst 36' (o.g.)	Report	5' Pore	Stadium: Starfire Sports Complex; Attendance: 1,514; Referee: Ricardo Salazar (USA)

On March 1, the Timbers sent allocation money to Sporting Kansas City in exchange for midfielder Jack Jewsbury just before leaving for Tukwila, Washington to attend the 2011 Cascadia Summit. That same day it was announced that rookie Darlington Nagbe would have to undergo surgery for a sports hernia and would miss 2 to 4 weeks.

The first match of the Cascadia Summit saw the Timbers defeat hosts Seattle Sounders FC 2–0 off of goals by trialist Jorge Perlaza and Kenny Cooper. New signing Jack Jewsbury wore the captain's armband for Portland, though he had been with the team for only two days, and would later be named captain on a permanent basis.

The next day, Portland faced their other Cascadia rivals, Vancouver Whitecaps FC, and the Timbers made 11 changes to the side that faced Seattle. Midfielder Ryan Pore scored early in the first half but the Whitecaps equalized before halftime thanks to an own goal from defender David Horst. Portland's reserves held Vancouver scoreless in the second half to come away with a 1–1 draw.

=== Final preparations ===
March 12, 2011	San Jose Earthquakes	1–1	Portland Timbers	Santa Clara, California
13:00 PST	Wondolowski 69' (pen.); Leitch (red card) 72'	Report	52' Brunner	Stadium: Buck Shaw Stadium

Portland officially signed trialist Jorge Perlaza on March 7 after clearing up a complicated contract situation with his previous club, Deportes Tolima. After donning the armband during the Cascadia Summit, midfielder Jack Jewsbury was named captain for the remainder of the season on March 11.

The Timbers played their final preseason game on March 12 versus fellow Western Conference side San Jose Earthquakes at Buck Shaw Stadium in Santa Clara, California. Portland defender Eric Brunner gave the Timbers the lead in the 52nd minute but the Earthquakes equalized from the penalty spot 17 minutes later. San Jose defender Chris Leitch was sent off late in the game but, due to it being a preseason training match, the Earthquakes were allowed to replace him. Portland held on for the 1–1 draw to finish their preseason undefeated.

On March 14, Portland announced that Oregon-based windows and doors manufacturer Jeld-Wen had purchased the naming rights for PGE Park and that the stadium would be known as Jeld-Wen Field effective immediately. While details of the deal were not announced it was speculated to be a multi-year, multimillion-dollar deal.

Although it had been widely reported in Uganda for several weeks, the Timbers officially announced the signing of forward Brian Umony on a year-long loan from South African side Tuks FC on March 16. Portland announced three more player additions the next day as former Portland Timbers (USL) midfielder Rodrigo López, SuperDraft pick Chris Taylor and Supplemental Draft pick Spencer Thompson were all signed to contracts.

Just one day before the Timbers inaugural MLS game versus defending champions Colorado Rapids, Portland General Manager / Technical director Gavin Wilkinson revealed that the team had given up their pursuit of former Arsenal defender Kerrea Gilbert due to his P-1 visa being denied. Gilbert was removed from the official roster later that day.

== Regular season ==
March 19, 2011 MLS	Colorado Rapids	3–1	Portland Timbers	Commerce City, Colorado
18:00 PDT	Larentowicz 8'; Cummings 29'; Smith 30'	Report	80' Cooper	Stadium: DSG Park; Attendance: 17,139; Referee: Ricardo Salazar (USA)

March 26, 2011 MLS	Toronto FC	2–0	Portland Timbers	Toronto, Ontario CAN
11:00 PDT	Martina 14', 70'; Yourassowsky (red card) 84'	Report		Stadium: BMO Field; Attendance: 20,086; Referee: Silviu Petrescu (CAN)

March 29, 2011 USOC Qual	Portland Timbers	2–0	Chivas USA	Portland, Oregon
19:00 PDT	Jewsbury 84'; Brunner 86'	Report	(red card) 43' Boyens	Stadium: Merlo Field; Attendance: 5,061 (SO); Referee: Juan Guzman (USA)

April 2, 2011 MLS	New England Revolution	1–1	Portland Timbers	Foxborough, Massachusetts
16:30 PDT	McCarthy 22'	Report	38' Jewsbury	Stadium: Gillette Stadium; Attendance: 7,114; Referee: Terry Vaughn (USA)

April 14, 2011 MLS	Portland Timbers	4–2	Chicago Fire	Portland, Oregon
20:00 PDT	Perlaza 29', 47'; Wallace 37'; Robinson 84' (o.g.)	Report	65' (o.g.) Brunner; 80' Pappa	Stadium: Jeld-Wen Field; Attendance: 18,627 (SO); Referee: Ricardo Salazar (USA)

April 17, 2011 MLS	Portland Timbers	3–2	FC Dallas	Portland, Oregon
15:00 PDT	Jewsbury 13'; Cooper 35'; Wallace 55'	Report	83' Ferreira; 86' Shea	Stadium: Jeld-Wen Field; Attendance: 18,627 (SO); Referee: Mark Geiger (USA)

April 23, 2011 MLS	Los Angeles Galaxy	3–0	Portland Timbers	Carson, California
20:00 PDT	Barrett 4'; Donovan 8' (pen.), 67'	Report		Stadium: The Home Depot Center; Attendance: 23,719; Referee: Ramón Hernández (USA)

April 30, 2011 MLS	Portland Timbers	1–0	Real Salt Lake	Portland, Oregon
19:30 PDT	Cooper 22'	Report		Stadium: Jeld-Wen Field; Attendance: 18,627 (SO); Referee: Jair Marrufo (USA)

May 3, 2011 USOC Qual	Portland Timbers	0–1 (a.e.t.)	San Jose Earthquakes	Portland, Oregon
19:30 PDT		Report	120' Opara	Stadium: Jeld-Wen Field; Attendance: 11,412; Referee: Alejandro Mariscal (USA)

May 6, 2011 MLS	Portland Timbers	1–0	Philadelphia Union	Portland, Oregon
19:30 PDT	Danso 72'	Report		Stadium: Jeld-Wen Field; Attendance: 18,627 (SO); Referee: Silviu Petrescu (CAN)

May 14, 2011 MLS / CC	Seattle Sounders FC	1–1	Portland Timbers	Seattle, Washington
20:00 PDT	Fernández 52'	Report	65' Danso	Stadium: Qwest Field; Attendance: 36,593 (SO); Referee: Jair Marrufo (USA)

May 21, 2011 MLS	Portland Timbers	1–0	Columbus Crew	Portland, Oregon
20:00 PDT	Brunner 46'	Report		Stadium: Jeld-Wen Field; Attendance: 18,627 (SO); Referee: Edvin Jurisevic (USA)

May 25, 2011 Friendly	Portland Timbers	0–2	Ajax	Portland, Oregon
19:00 PDT		Report	18' Ebecilio; 89' de Zeeuw	Stadium: Jeld-Wen Field; Attendance: 18,627 (SO); Referee: Ricardo Salazar (USA)

May 29, 2011 MLS	Portland Timbers	2–3	D.C. United	Portland, Oregon
14:00 PDT	Jewsbury 67' (pen.); Perlaza 88'	Report	13' Kitchen; 75' (pen.) Pontius; 85' Wolff	Stadium: Jeld-Wen Field; Attendance: 18,627 (SO); Referee: Geoff Gamble (CAN)

June 4, 2011 MLS	Chivas USA	1–0	Portland Timbers	Carson, California
19:30 PDT	Mondaini 70'	Report		Stadium: The Home Depot Center; Attendance: 14,076; Referee: Chris Penso (USA)

June 11, 2011 MLS	Portland Timbers	0–1	Colorado Rapids	Portland, Oregon
19:30 PDT		Report	90+2' Moor	Stadium: Jeld-Wen Field; Attendance: 18,627 (SO); Referee: Abiodun Okulaja (USA)

June 19, 2011 MLS	Portland Timbers	3–3	New York Red Bulls	Portland, Oregon
19:00 PDT	Jewsbury 48'; Goldthwaite 49'; Keel 68' (o.g.)	Report	5' da Luz; 73' (red card) 90+3' Henry; 90+5' (pen.) De Rosario	Stadium: Jeld-Wen Field; Attendance: 18,627 (SO); Referee: Ricardo Salazar (USA)

June 25, 2011 MLS	FC Dallas	4–0	Portland Timbers	Frisco, Texas
17:30 PDT	Loyd 33'; John 38'; Shea 58'; Luna 85'	Report		Stadium: Pizza Hut Park; Attendance: 10,470; Referee: Elias Bazakos (USA)

July 2, 2011 MLS	Portland Timbers	1–2	Sporting Kansas City	Portland, Oregon
20:00 PDT	Nagbe 45'	Report	15' Sapong; 19' Collin	Stadium: Jeld-Wen Field; Attendance: 18,627 (SO); Referee: Hilario Grajeda (USA)

July 7, 2011 Friendly	Portland Timbers	0–1	América	Portland, Oregon
19:30 PDT		Report	16' Reyna	Stadium: Jeld-Wen Field; Attendance: 17,198; Referee: Alejandro Mariscal (USA)

July 10, 2011 MLS / CC	Portland Timbers	2–3	Seattle Sounders FC	Portland, Oregon
13:00 PDT	Parke 46' (o.g.); Perlaza 69'; Brunner (red card) 81'	Report	57', 74' Montero; 83' (pen.) Alonso	Stadium: Jeld-Wen Field; Attendance: 18,627 (SO); Referee: Jorge Gonzalez (USA)

July 16, 2011 MLS	Chicago Fire	0–1	Portland Timbers	Bridgeview, Illinois
17:30 PDT	Cuesta (red card) 63'	Report	25' (pen.) Jewsbury	Stadium: Toyota Park; Attendance: 16,419; Referee: Elias Bazakos (USA)

July 20, 2011 Friendly	Portland Timbers	2–3	West Bromwich Albion	Portland, Oregon
20:00 PDT	Johnson 26'; Lowry 29'	Report	65' Morrison; 68' Tchoyi; 90+1' Tamaş	Stadium: Jeld-Wen Field; Attendance: 18,627 (SO); Referee: Allen Chapman (USA)

July 23, 2011 MLS	Columbus Crew	1–0	Portland Timbers	Columbus, Ohio
17:00 PDT	Danso 79' (o.g.)	Report		Stadium: Columbus Crew Stadium; Attendance: 11,246; Referee: Andrew Chapin (USA)

July 26, 2011 Friendly	Portland Timbers	2–0	Independiente	Portland, Oregon
20:00 PDT	Zizzo 36'; Umony 39'	Report		Stadium: Jeld-Wen Field; Attendance: 18,627 (SO); Referee: Yader Reyes (USA)

July 30, 2011 MLS	Portland Timbers	2–2	Toronto FC	Portland, Oregon
20:00 PDT	Johnson 23'; Jewsbury 57' (pen.)	Report	71' Marošević; 81' Koevermans	Stadium: Jeld-Wen Field; Attendance: 18,627 (SO); Referee: Kevin Stott (USA)

August 3, 2011 MLS	Portland Timbers	3–0	Los Angeles Galaxy	Portland, Oregon
19:30 PDT	Chabala 26'; Perlaza 33'; Brunner 68'	Report		Stadium: Jeld-Wen Field; Attendance: 18,627 (SO); Referee: Mark Kadlecik (USA)

August 6, 2011 MLS	San Jose Earthquakes	1–1	Portland Timbers	Santa Clara, California
19:30 PDT	Gordon 67'	Report	23' Cooper; (red card) 90' Hall	Stadium: Buck Shaw Stadium; Attendance: 10,525; Referee: Hilario Grajeda (USA)

August 14, 2011 MLS	Houston Dynamo	2–1	Portland Timbers	Houston, Texas
18:00 PDT	Moffat 17'; Ching 27'	Report	56' Jewsbury	Stadium: Robertson Stadium; Attendance: 14,475; Referee: Baldomero Toledo (USA)

August 17, 2011 MLS	Sporting Kansas City	3–1	Portland Timbers	Kansas City, Kansas
17:30 PDT	Zusi 25', 40'; Saad 72'	Report	81' Dike	Stadium: Livestrong Sporting Park; Attendance: 15,271; Referee: Elias Bazakos (USA)

August 20, 2011 MLS / CC	Portland Timbers	2–1	Vancouver Whitecaps FC	Portland, Oregon
19:00 PDT	Chará 2'; Perlaza 33'	Report	88' Sanvezzo	Stadium: Jeld-Wen Field; Attendance: 18,627 (SO); Referee: Jair Marrufo (USA)

August 24, 2011 MLS	Portland Timbers	1–0	Chivas USA	Portland, Oregon
20:00 PDT	Brunner 44'	Report		Stadium: Jeld-Wen Field; Attendance: 18,627 (SO); Referee: Edvin Jurisevic (USA)

September 10, 2011 MLS	Philadelphia Union	0–0	Portland Timbers	Chester, Pennsylvania
16:30 PDT		Report		Stadium: PPL Park; Attendance: 18,504; Referee: Chris Penso (USA)

September 16, 2011 MLS	Portland Timbers	3–0	New England Revolution	Portland, Oregon
20:00 PDT	Chará 9'; Cooper 32'; Nagbe 66'	Report		Stadium: Jeld-Wen Field; Attendance: 20,323 (SO); Referee: Hilario Grajeda (USA)

September 21, 2011 MLS	Portland Timbers	1–1	San Jose Earthquakes	Portland, Oregon
19:30 PDT	Cooper 9'	Report	70' Stephenson	Stadium: Jeld-Wen Field; Attendance: 18,627 (SO); Referee: Michael Kennedy (USA)

September 24, 2011 MLS	New York Red Bulls	2–0	Portland Timbers	Harrison, New Jersey
16:30 PDT	Richards 21'; Rodgers 66' (pen.)	Report	(red card) 64' Alhassan	Stadium: Red Bull Arena; Attendance: 25,008; Referee: Alex Prus (USA)

October 2, 2011 MLS / CC	Vancouver Whitecaps FC	0–1	Portland Timbers	Vancouver, British Columbia CAN
13:30 PDT		Report	25' Cooper	Stadium: BC Place Stadium; Attendance: 21,000 (SO); Referee: Mark Geiger (USA)

October 14, 2011 MLS	Portland Timbers	0–2	Houston Dynamo	Portland, Oregon
19:30 PDT		Report	36' Hainault; 59' Cruz	Stadium: Jeld-Wen Field; Attendance: 20,323 (SO); Referee: Baldomero Toledo (USA)

October 19, 2011 MLS	D.C. United	1–1	Portland Timbers	Washington, D.C. USA
17:00 PDT	De Rosario 73'	Report	24' Cooper	Stadium: RFK Stadium; Attendance: 14,317; Referee: Jair Marrufo (USA)

October 22, 2011 MLS	Real Salt Lake	1–1	Portland Timbers	Sandy, Utah
18:00 PDT	Saborío 45+1'	Report	90+1' Danso	Stadium: Rio Tinto Stadium; Attendance: 20,378; Referee: Silviu Petrescu (CAN)

== Competitions ==
Competition	Started round	Final position / round	First match	Last match
MLS	—	12th	March 19, 2011	October 22, 2011
U.S. Open Cup	Play-in round	Qualification semifinals	March 29, 2011	May 3, 2011
Cascadia Cup	—	2nd	May 14, 2011	October 2, 2011

Updated to match played October 26, 2011
Source: Competitions

=== Major League Soccer ===
==== Western Conference standings ====
Pos	Team	Pld	W	L	T	GF	GA	GD	Pts	Qualification
1	LA Galaxy	34	19	5	10	48	28	+20	67	MLS Cup Conference Semifinals
2	Seattle Sounders FC	34	18	7	9	56	37	+19	63	MLS Cup Conference Semifinals
3	Real Salt Lake	34	15	11	8	44	36	+8	53	MLS Cup Conference Semifinals
4	FC Dallas	34	15	12	7	42	39	+3	52	MLS Cup Play-In Round
5	Colorado Rapids	34	12	9	13	46	42	+4	49	MLS Cup Play-In Round
6	Portland Timbers	34	11	14	9	40	48	−8	42	
7	San Jose Earthquakes	34	8	12	14	40	45	−5	38	
8	Chivas USA	34	8	14	12	41	43	−2	36	
9	Vancouver Whitecaps FC	34	6	18	10	35	55	−20	28	

Source: MLS

==== Overall standings ====
Pos	Team	Pld	W	L	T	GF	GA	GD	Pts	Qualification
1	LA Galaxy (S, C)	34	19	5	10	48	28	+20	67	CONCACAF Champions League
2	Seattle Sounders FC	34	18	7	9	56	37	+19	63	CONCACAF Champions League
3	Real Salt Lake	34	15	11	8	44	36	+8	53	CONCACAF Champions League
4	FC Dallas	34	15	12	7	42	39	+3	52	
5	Sporting Kansas City	34	13	9	12	50	40	+10	51	
6	Houston Dynamo	34	12	9	13	45	41	+4	49	CONCACAF Champions League
7	Colorado Rapids	34	12	9	13	44	41	+3	49	
8	Philadelphia Union	34	11	8	15	44	36	+8	48	
9	Columbus Crew	34	13	13	8	43	44	−1	47	
10	New York Red Bulls	34	10	8	16	50	44	+6	46	
11	Chicago Fire	34	9	9	16	46	45	+1	43	
12	Portland Timbers	34	11	14	9	40	48	−8	42	
13	D.C. United	34	9	13	12	49	52	−3	39	
14	San Jose Earthquakes	34	8	12	14	40	45	−5	38	
15	Chivas USA	34	8	14	12	41	43	−2	36	
16	Toronto FC	34	6	13	15	36	59	−23	33	CONCACAF Champions League
17	New England Revolution	34	5	16	13	38	58	−20	28	
18	Vancouver Whitecaps FC	34	6	18	10	35	55	−20	28	

Source: MLS
Rules for classification: 1) points; 2) head-to-head record; 3) goal difference; 4) number of goals scored
(C) Champions; (S) Supporters' Shield

==== Results summary ====
Overall								Home						Away					
Pld	Pts	W	L	T	GF	GA	GD	W	L	T	GF	GA	GD	W	L	T	GF	GA	GD
34	42	11	14	9	40	48	−8	9	5	3	30	22	+8	2	9	6	10	26	−16

Last updated: October 26, 2011
Source: Portland Timbers
Pld = Matches played; Pts = Points; W = Matches won; T = Matches tied; L = Matches lost; GF = Goals for; GA = Goals against; GD = Goal difference

==== Results by round ====
Round	1	2	3	4	5	6	7	8	9	10	11	12	13	14	15	16	17	18	19	20	21	22	23	24	25	26	27	28	29	30	31	32	33	34
Stadium	A	A	A	H	H	A	H	H	A	H	H	A	H	H	A	H	H	A	A	H	H	A	A	A	H	H	A	H	H	A	A	H	A	A
Result	L	L	T	W	W	L	W	W	T	W	L	L	L	T	L	L	L	W	L	T	W	T	L	L	W	W	T	W	T	L	W	L	T	T
Conference	8	9	8	8	4	6	6	5	6	5	6	7	8	7	7	8	8	8	8	8	7	7	7	7	7	6	6	6	6	6	6	6	6	6
Overall	17	18	17	17	9	13	10	8	8	6	8	9	12	11	12	15	15	14	14	14	13	13	13	13	13	11	12	11	10	12	11	11	11	12

Updated to match(es) played on October 26, 2011. Source: Portland Timbers
A = Away; H = Home; W = Win; L = Loss; T = Tie

==== Reserve League ====
===== West Division standings =====
Pos	Club	Pts	Pld	W	L	T	GF	GA	GD
1	Seattle Sounders FC Reserves	25	10	8	1	1	21	11	+10
2	Portland Timbers Reserves	20	10	6	2	2	24	16	+8
3	Chivas USA Reserves	13	10	3	3	4	18	21	−3
4	San Jose Earthquakes Reserves	10	9	3	5	1	11	12	−1
5	Vancouver Whitecaps FC Reserves	8	10	2	6	2	10	15	−5
6	Los Angeles Galaxy Reserves	5	9	1	6	2	11	20	−9

=== U.S. Open Cup ===
==== Qualifying bracket ====
Home teams listed at top of bracket.

Play-in round
10	Portland Timbers	2
8	Chivas USA	0

Qualification semifinals
2	San Jose Earthquakes (aet)	1
10	Portland Timbers	0
4	Chicago Fire	2
1	Colorado Rapids	1

Qualification final
2	San Jose Earthquakes	2 (4)
4	Chicago Fire (aet) (p)	2 (5)

==== Play-in round ====
March 29, 2011
19:00 PDT

Portland Timbers	2–0	Chivas USA
Jewsbury 84'; Brunner 86'	Report	(red card) 43' Boyens

Merlo Field
Attendance: 5,061 (SO)
Referee: Juan Guzman

==== Qualification semifinals ====
May 3, 2011
19:30 PDT

Portland Timbers	0–1 (a.e.t.)	San Jose Earthquakes
	Report	120' Opara

Jeld-Wen Field
Attendance: 11,412
Referee: Alejandro Mariscal

=== Cascadia Cup ===
The Cascadia Cup is a trophy that was created in 2004 by supporters of the Portland Timbers, Seattle Sounders FC and Vancouver Whitecaps FC. It is awarded to the club with the best record in league games versus the other participants. Since 2009, when Seattle joined Major League Soccer, the cup has been contested between Portland and Vancouver only. In 2011, when the Timbers and the Whitecaps join the Sounders in MLS, all three Cascadia rivals will again vie for the cup.

Pos	Club	Pts	Pld	W	L	T	GF	GA	GD
1	Seattle Sounders FC	8	4	2	0	2	9	6	+3
2	Portland Timbers	7	4	2	1	1	6	5	+1
3	Vancouver Whitecaps FC	1	4	0	3	1	4	8	−4

== Club ==
=== Coaching staff ===
Position	Staff
Head coach	(Scotland) John Spencer
Assistant coach	(England) Trevor James
Assistant coach	(United States) Amos Magee
Goalkeeper coach	(England) Adam Smith
Strength and conditioning Coach	(Morocco) Karim Derqaoui
Athletic director	(United States) Nik Wald

Updated to match played December 9, 2010
Source: Portland Timbers

=== Management ===
Majority Owner & President	(United States) Merritt Paulson
Chief Operations Officer	(United States) Mike Golub
General Manager / Technical Director	(New Zealand) Gavin Wilkinson
Ground (capacity and dimensions)	Jeld-Wen Field (18,627 / 110x70 yards)

Updated to match played March 23, 2011
Source: Portland Timbers

=== Staff recognition ===
MLSsoccer.com Team of the Week

Week	Staff member	Opponent(s)	Ref
21	(Scotland) John Spencer	Los Angeles Galaxy, San Jose Earthquakes	

== Squad ==
=== Kits ===
Primary	Primary Alt.	Secondary

Type	Shirt	Shorts	Socks	First appearance / Info
Primary	Green / White sleeves	White	Green	
Primary Alt.	Green / White sleeves	Green	Green	MLS, March 19 against Colorado
Secondary	Red / White sleeves	White	Red	

=== Final roster ===
Note: Flags indicate national team as defined under FIFA eligibility rules; some limited exceptions apply. Players may hold more than one non-FIFA nationality.

No.	Pos.	Nation	Player
1	GK	USA	Troy Perkins
2	DF	USA	Kevin Goldthwaite
4	DF	USA	Mike Chabala
5	DF	USA	Eric Brunner
6	MF	LBR	Darlington Nagbe
7	MF	USA	Sal Zizzo
8	MF	USA	Peter Lowry
9	FW	USA	Bright Dike
10	FW	ENG	Eddie Johnson
11	MF	GHA	Kalif Alhassan
12	DF	USA	David Horst
13	MF	USA	Jack Jewsbury (captain)
14	MF	HAI	James Marcelin
15	FW	COL	Jorge Perlaza

No.	Pos.	Nation	Player
17	MF	USA	Eric Alexander
19	MF	USA	Rodrigo López
20	GK	NZL	Jake Gleeson
21	MF	COL	Diego Chará
22	DF	CRC	Rodney Wallace
24	GK	USA	Adin Brown
25	DF	SLV	Steve Purdy
26	FW	UGA	Brian Umony (on loan from Tuks FC)
27	DF	USA	Chris Taylor
28	MF	USA	Freddie Braun
30	MF	JAM	Lovel Palmer
31	FW	USA	Spencer Thompson
33	FW	USA	Kenny Cooper
98	DF	GAM	Mamadou Danso

=== Reserve team players ===
This list shows players who have played for the team in official 2011 MLS Reserve Division games, but are not part of the senior roster.

Note: Flags indicate national team as defined under FIFA eligibility rules; some limited exceptions apply. Players may hold more than one non-FIFA nationality.

No.	Pos.	Nation	Player
—	GK	USA	Ian Andeson (soccer) (guest player)
—	DF	USA	Dillon Barna (guest player)
—	DF	BEN	Damien Chrysostome (guest player)
—	DF	ISL	Stefán Gíslason (guest player)
—	DF	USA	Jesus Gonzalez (Portland Timbers U23's)
—	DF	CAN	Kevin Harmse (guest player)
—	DF	USA	Mark Lee (guest player)
—	DF	USA	Taylor Mueller (guest player)
—	DF	GHA	Douglas Nyame (guest player)
—	DF	CAN	Ross Smith (Portland Timbers U23's)
—	MF	USA	Tracy Hasson (Portland Timbers U23's)
—	MF	USA	Nosa Iyoha (Portland Timbers U23's)

No.	Pos.	Nation	Player
—	MF	GAM	Omar Jasseh (guest player)
—	MF	USA	Dylan Leslie (guest player)
—	MF	USA	Tony McManus (guest player)
—	MF	USA	Sean Morris (Portland Timbers U23's)
—	MF	USA	Alex Nimo (guest player)
—	MF	USA	Paul Ogunyemi (Portland Timbers U23's)
—	FW	USA	Bryan Burke (guest player)
—	FW	TRI	Darryl Roberts (guest player)
—	FW	IRL	Cillian Sheridan (guest player)
—	FW	USA	Darren Spicer (guest player)

=== Player recognition ===
MLS W.O.R.K.S. Humanitarian of the Month

Month	Player	Ref
August	(United States) Jack Jewsbury	

AT&T Goal of the Week

Week	Player	Opponent	Ref
5	(Colombia) Jorge Perlaza	Chicago Fire	
16	(Liberia) Darlington Nagbe	Sporting Kansas City	
29	(United States) Kenny Cooper	Vancouver Whitecaps FC	

MLS Save of the Week

Week	Player	Opponent	Ref
2	(New Zealand) Jake Gleeson	Toronto FC	
5	(New Zealand) Jake Gleeson	FC Dallas	
10	(United States) Troy Perkins	Columbus Crew	
17	(United States) Troy Perkins	Seattle Sounders FC	
18	(United States) Troy Perkins	Chicago Fire	
28	(United States) Troy Perkins	New York Red Bulls	

MLSsoccer.com Team of the Week

Week	Player	Opponent(s)	Ref
5	(Ghana) Kalif Alhassan	Chicago Fire, FC Dallas	
5	(Colombia) Jorge Perlaza	Chicago Fire, FC Dallas	
5	(Costa Rica) Rodney Wallace	Chicago Fire, FC Dallas	
9	(The Gambia) Mamadou Danso	Seattle Sounders FC	
12	(United States) Troy Perkins	Chivas USA	
18	(Ghana) Kalif Alhassan	Chicago Fire	
18	(United States) Troy Perkins	Chicago Fire	
19	(Liberia) Darlington Nagbe	Columbus Crew	
20	(United States) Sal Zizzo	Toronto FC	
21	(United States) Mike Chabala	Los Angeles Galaxy, San Jose Earthquakes	
21	(Colombia) Jorge Perlaza	Los Angeles Galaxy, San Jose Earthquakes	
23	(Colombia) Diego Chará	Sporting Kansas City, Vancouver Whitecaps FC	
24	(United States) Eric Brunner	Chivas USA	
27	(Liberia) Darlington Nagbe	New England Revolution	
32	(The Gambia) Mamadou Danso	D.C. United, Real Salt Lake	

=== Statistics ===
==== Appearances and goals ====
All players contracted or loaned to the club during the season included.

No.	Pos	Nat	Player	Total		Major League Soccer		U.S. Open Cup Qual.	
No.	Pos	Nat	Player	Apps	Goals	Apps	Goals	Apps	Goals
1	GK	(United States) USA	Troy Perkins	30	0	29+0	0	1+0	0
2	DF	(United States) USA	Kevin Goldthwaite	5	1	3+1	1	1+0	0
4	DF	(United States) USA	Mike Chabala	14	1	13+1	1	0+0	0
5	DF	(United States) USA	Eric Brunner	33	4	31+1	3	1+0	1
6	MF	(Liberia) LBR	Darlington Nagbe	29	2	21+7	2	0+1	0
7	MF	(United States) USA	Sal Zizzo	31	0	14+16	0	1+0	0
8	MF	(United States) USA	Peter Lowry	4	0	2+1	0	1+0	0
9	FW	(United States) USA	Bright Dike	11	1	0+11	1	0+0	0
10	FW	(England) ENG	Eddie Johnson	7	1	3+4	1	0+0	0
11	MF	(Ghana) GHA	Kalif Alhassan	33	0	27+5	0	1+0	0
12	DF	(United States) USA	David Horst	18	0	11+5	0	2+0	0
13	MF	(United States) USA	Jack Jewsbury	32	8	31+0	7	0+1	1
14	MF	(Haiti) HAI	James Marcelin	22	0	12+8	0	2+0	0
15	FW	(Colombia) COL	Jorge Perlaza	32	6	26+5	6	1+0	0
(16)	MF	(Scotland) SCO	Adam Moffat (traded to (United States) Houston Dynamo)	5	0	0+4	0	1+0	0
17	MF	(United States) USA	Eric Alexander	6	0	3+3	0	0+0	0
(17)	MF	(United States) USA	Jeremy Hall (traded to (United States) FC Dallas)	19	0	17+0	0	0+2	0
19	MF	(United States) USA	Rodrigo López	1	0	0+0	0	1+0	0
20	GK	(New Zealand) NZL	Jake Gleeson	5	0	3+1	0	1+0	0
21	MF	(Colombia) COL	Diego Chará	28	2	27+1	2	0+0	0
22	DF	(Costa Rica) CRC	Rodney Wallace	26	2	22+3	2	1+0	0
(23)	MF	(United States) USA	Ryan Pore (loaned to (Canada) Montreal Impact)	10	0	2+6	0	2+0	0
24	GK	(United States) USA	Adin Brown	2	0	2+0	0	0+0	0
25	DF	(El Salvador) SLV	Steve Purdy	10	0	8+0	0	2+0	0
26	FW	(Uganda) UGA	Brian Umony	6	0	0+6	0	0+0	0
27	DF	(United States) USA	Chris Taylor	0	0	0+0	0	0+0	0
28	MF	(United States) USA	Freddie Braun	1	0	0+0	0	1+0	0
30	MF	(Jamaica) JAM	Lovel Palmer	15	0	15+0	0	0+0	0
31	FW	(United States) USA	Spencer Thompson	1	0	0+0	0	1+0	0
(32)	GK	(United States) USA	Kevin Guppy (3 week loan from MLS goalkeeper pool)	0	0	0+0	0	0+0	0
33	FW	(United States) USA	Kenny Cooper	35	8	29+5	8	1+0	0
98	DF	(The Gambia) GAM	Mamadou Danso	25	3	23+1	3	0+1	0

==== Top scorers ====
Players with 1 goal or more included only.

Rk.	Nat	Pos	Player	Total	Major League Soccer	U.S. Open Cup Qual.
1	(United States)	FW	Kenny Cooper	8	8	0
1	(United States)	MF	Jack Jewsbury	8	7	1
3	(Colombia)	FW	Jorge Perlaza	6	6	0
4	(United States)	DF	Eric Brunner	4	3	1
5	(The Gambia)	DF	Mamadou Danso	3	3	0
6	(Colombia)	MF	Diego Chará	2	2	0
6	(Liberia)	MF	Darlington Nagbe	2	2	0
6	(Costa Rica)	DF	Rodney Wallace	2	2	0
9	(United States)	DF	Mike Chabala	1	1	0
9	(United States)	FW	Bright Dike	1	1	0
9	(United States)	DF	Kevin Goldthwaite	1	1	0
9	(England)	FW	Eddie Johnson	1	1	0
			OWN GOALS	3	3	0
			TOTALS	42	40	2

==== Disciplinary record ====
Players with 1 card or more included only.

No.	Nat	Pos	Player	Total		Major League Soccer		U.S. Open Cup Qual.	
No.	Nat	Pos	Player	Booked	Sent off (straight red)	Booked	Sent off (straight red)	Booked	Sent off (straight red)
4	(United States)	DF	Mike Chabala	4	0	4	0	0	0
5	(United States)	DF	Eric Brunner	1	1	1	1	0	0
8	(United States)	MF	Peter Lowry	1	0	1	0	0	0
9	(United States)	FW	Bright Dike	2	0	2	0	0	0
10	(England)	FW	Eddie Johnson	1	0	1	0	0	0
11	(Ghana)	MF	Kalif Alhassan	3	1	3	1	0	0
13	(United States)	MF	Jack Jewsbury	5	0	5	0	0	0
14	(Haiti)	MF	James Marcelin	5	0	4	0	1	0
15	(Colombia)	FW	Jorge Perlaza	2	0	2	0	0	0
(16)	(Scotland)	MF	Adam Moffat	1	0	1	0	0	0
(17)	(United States)	MF	Jeremy Hall	7	1	6	1	1	0
21	(Colombia)	MF	Diego Chará	7	0	7	0	0	0
22	(Costa Rica)	DF	Rodney Wallace	6	0	6	0	0	0
(23)	(United States)	MF	Ryan Pore	1	0	0	0	1	0
25	(El Salvador)	DF	Steve Purdy	3	0	2	0	1	0
26	(Uganda)	FW	Brian Umony	1	0	1	0	0	0
30	(Jamaica)	MF	Lovel Palmer	2	0	2	0	0	0
33	(United States)	FW	Kenny Cooper	2	0	2	0	0	0
			TOTALS	54	3	50	3	4	0

==== Goalkeeper stats ====
All goalkeepers included.

No.	Nat	Player	Total				Major League Soccer				U.S. Open Cup Qual.			
No.	Nat	Player	MIN	GA	GAA	SV	MIN	GA	GAA	SV	MIN	GA	GAA	SV
1	(United States)	Troy Perkins	2730	39	1.29	94	2610	38	1.31	91	120	1	0.75	3
20	(New Zealand)	Jake Gleeson	405	6	1.33	14	315	6	1.71	12	90	0	0.00	2
24	(United States)	Adin Brown	135	4	2.67	5	135	4	2.67	5	0	0	—	0
(32)	(United States)	Kevin Guppy	0	0	—	0	0	0	—	0	0	0	—	0
		TOTALS	3270	49	1.35	112	3060	48	1.41	107	210	1	0.43	5

=== Player movement ===
==== Transfers in ====
Date	Player	Position	Previous club	Fee/notes	Ref
October 19, 2010	(United States) Steve Cronin	GK	(United States) Portland Timbers (USL)	Free	
October 19, 2010	(United States) Bright Dike	FW	(United States) Portland Timbers (USL)	Free	
October 19, 2010	(England) Eddie Johnson	FW	(United States) Austin Aztex^{[A]}	Free	
October 19, 2010	(United States) Ryan Pore	MF	(United States) Portland Timbers (USL)	Free	
November 22, 2010	(United States) Jeremy Hall	MF	(United States) New York Red Bulls	Acquired for a 2011 3rd round SuperDraft pick	
November 24, 2010	(United States) Dax McCarty	MF	(United States) FC Dallas	Expansion Draft, 1st round; immediately traded	
November 24, 2010	(United States) Eric Brunner	DF	(United States) Columbus Crew	Expansion Draft, 2nd round	
November 24, 2010	(Scotland) Adam Moffat	MF	(United States) Columbus Crew	Expansion Draft, 3rd round	
November 24, 2010	(United States) Anthony Wallace	DF	(United States) Colorado Rapids	Expansion Draft, 4th round; immediately traded	
November 24, 2010	(United States) David Horst	DF	(United States) Real Salt Lake	Expansion Draft, 5th round	
November 24, 2010	(United States) Peter Lowry	MF	(United States) Chicago Fire	Expansion Draft, 7th round	
November 24, 2010	(United States) Jordan Graye	DF	(United States) D.C. United	Expansion Draft, 9th round; immediately traded	
November 24, 2010	(El Salvador) Arturo Alvarez	MF	(United States) San Jose Earthquakes	Expansion Draft, 10th round; immediately traded	
November 24, 2010	(Costa Rica) Rodney Wallace	DF	(United States) D.C. United	Acquired with a 2011 1st round Supplemental Draft pick in exchange for Dax McCarty and allocation money	
December 13, 2010	(England) Kerrea Gilbert	DF	(England) Arsenal	Free	
December 15, 2010	(Ghana) Kalif Alhassan	MF	(United States) Portland Timbers (USL)	Free	
December 15, 2010	(The Gambia) Mamadou Danso	DF	(United States) Portland Timbers (USL)	Free	
December 15, 2010	(United States) Kevin Goldthwaite	DF	(United States) Portland Timbers (USL)	Free	
December 15, 2010	(Haiti) James Marcelin	MF	(United States) Portland Timbers (USL)	Free	
December 17, 2010	(United States) Troy Perkins	GK	(United States) D.C. United	Acquired with salary considerations in exchange for Steve Cronin and allocation money	
January 13, 2011	(Liberia) Darlington Nagbe (R)	MF	(United States) Akron Zips (United States) Cleveland Internationals	SuperDraft, 1st round; signed to Generation adidas contract prior to draft	
January 17, 2011	(United States) Kenny Cooper	FW	(Germany) 1860 Munich	Undisclosed fee; rights acquired via Allocation Ranking	
January 26, 2011	(United States) Adin Brown	GK	(United States) Portland Timbers (USL)	Free	
January 26, 2011	(United States) Steve Purdy	DF	(United States) Portland Timbers (USL)	Free	
February 16, 2011	(United States) Sal Zizzo	MF	(United States) Chivas USA	Acquired for allocation money	
February 17, 2011	(United States) Freddie Braun	MF	(United States) Portland Timbers U23's	Free	
February 17, 2011	(New Zealand) Jake Gleeson	GK	(United States) Portland Timbers U23's	Free	
March 1, 2011	(United States) Jack Jewsbury	MF	(United States) Sporting Kansas City	Acquired for allocation money	
March 7, 2011	(Colombia) Jorge Perlaza	FW	(Colombia) Deportes Tolima	Undisclosed fee	
March 17, 2011	(United States) Rodrigo López	MF	(United States) Portland Timbers (USL)	Free	
March 17, 2011	(United States) Chris Taylor (R)	DF	(United States) Tulsa Golden Hurricane	SuperDraft, 2nd round	
March 17, 2011	(United States) Spencer Thompson (R)	FW	(United States) UC Irvine Anteaters	Supplemental Draft, 1st round	
April 13, 2011	(Colombia) Diego Chará	MF	(Colombia) Deportes Tolima	Undisclosed fee; signed to Designated Player contract	
July 21, 2011	(Jamaica) Lovel Palmer	DF	(United States) Houston Dynamo	Acquired with Mike Chabala and a 2011 international roster spot for Adam Moffat and allocation money	
July 21, 2011	(United States) Mike Chabala	DF	(United States) Houston Dynamo	Acquired with Lovel Palmer and a 2011 international roster spot for Adam Moffat and allocation money	
August 19, 2011	(United States) Eric Alexander	MF	(United States) FC Dallas	Acquired in exchange for Jeremy Hall	

==== Loans in ====
Date	Player	Position	Loaned from	Fee/notes	Ref
March 16, 2011	(Uganda) Brian Umony	FW	(South Africa) Tuks FC	Season-long loan with option to buy	
March 28, 2011	(United States) Kevin Guppy	GK	MLS Goalkeeper Pool	Added to roster following injuries to Troy Perkins and Adin Brown; removed from roster on April 22, 2011	

==== Transfers out ====
Date	Player	Position	Destination club	Fee/notes	Ref
November 24, 2010	(United States) Dax McCarty	MF	(United States) D.C. United	Traded with allocation money for Rodney Wallace and a 2011 1st round Supplemental Draft pick	
November 24, 2010	(El Salvador) Arturo Alvarez	MF	(United States) Real Salt Lake	Traded for a 2011 2nd round SuperDraft pick	
November 24, 2010	(United States) Anthony Wallace	DF	(United States) Colorado Rapids	Traded for allocation money	
December 13, 2010	(United States) Jordan Graye	DF	(United States) Houston Dynamo	Traded for a 2014 4th round SuperDraft pick	
December 17, 2010	(United States) Steve Cronin	GK	(United States) D.C. United	Traded with allocation money for Troy Perkins and salary considerations	
March 18, 2011	(England) Kerrea Gilbert	DF	(England) Yeovil Town	P-1 visa denied, free transfer	
July 21, 2011	(Scotland) Adam Moffat	MF	(United States) Houston Dynamo	Traded with allocation money for Lovel Palmer, Mike Chabala and a 2011 international roster spot	
August 19, 2011	(United States) Jeremy Hall	DF	(United States) FC Dallas	Traded for Eric Alexander	

==== Loans out ====
Date	Player	Position	Destination club	Fee/notes	Ref
July 21, 2011	(United States) Ryan Pore	MF	(Canada) Montreal Impact	Season-long loan	

==== Unsigned draft picks ====
Date	Player	Position	Previous club	Notes	Ref
November 24, 2010	(United States) Robbie Findley	FW	(United States) Real Salt Lake	Expansion Draft, 6th round; out of contract, Portland will retain MLS rights	
November 24, 2010	(United States) Jonathan Bornstein	DF	(United States) Chivas USA	Expansion Draft, 8th round; out of contract, Portland will retain MLS rights	
January 18, 2011	(United States) Robby Lynch	MF	(United States) Evansville Purple Aces (United States) Kalamazoo Outrage	Supplemental Draft, 1st round; attended training camp, not offered a contract	
January 18, 2011	(United States) Raymundo Reza	FW	(United States) San Diego State Aztecs	Supplemental Draft, 2nd round; attended training camp, not offered a contract	
January 18, 2011	(United States) Taylor Mueller	DF	(United States) Washington Huskies	Supplemental Draft, 3rd round; attended training camp, not offered a contract	

==== Allocation ranking ====
Portland is in the No. 14 position in the MLS Allocation Ranking. The allocation ranking is the mechanism used to determine which MLS club has first priority to acquire a U.S. National Team player who signs with MLS after playing abroad, or a former MLS player who returns to the league after having gone to a club abroad for a transfer fee. Portland started 2011 ranked No. 2 on the allocation list and used its ranking to acquire Kenny Cooper. A ranking can be traded, provided that part of the compensation received in return is another club's ranking.

==== International roster spots ====
Portland has 11 international roster spots. Each club in Major League Soccer is allocated 8 international roster spots, which can be traded. Portland acquired its first additional spot from Los Angeles Galaxy on November 22, 2010 for use in the 2011 and 2012 seasons. On January 14, 2011 the club acquired a second additional spot from Seattle Sounders FC for use in the 2011 season only. Portland acquired a third additional spot from Houston Dynamo on July 21, 2011 for use during the remainder of the 2011 season only. There is no limit on the number of international slots on each club's roster. The remaining roster slots must belong to domestic players. For clubs based in the United States, a domestic player is either a U.S. citizen, a permanent resident (green card holder) or the holder of other special status (e.g., refugee or asylum status).

==== Future draft pick trades ====
Future picks acquired: 2014 SuperDraft Round 4 pick acquired from Houston Dynamo.
Future picks traded: None.

==== MLS rights to other players ====
Portland has the MLS rights to Jonathan Bornstein and Robbie Findley. Both players declined contract offers by the league and signed overseas with no transfer fee received. Portland acquired rights to both players by drafting them in the 2010 MLS Expansion Draft.

== Notes ==
A. ^{a} Johnson signed for Portland Timbers (USL) before the 2010 transfer deadline and was loaned back to Austin for the remainder of the 2010 season.
