= 2012 Portland Timbers season =

Portland Timbers
2012 season
- President: Merritt Paulson
- Head coach: John Spencer; Until 9 July 2012 Gavin Wilkinson; From July 9, 2012
- Stadium: Jeld-Wen Field; Portland, Oregon (Capacity: 20,438)
- Major League Soccer: Conference: 8th Overall: 17th
- MLS Cup Playoffs: Did not qualify
- U.S. Open Cup: Third round vs Cal FC
- Cascadia Cup: Winners
- Top goalscorer: League: Kris Boyd (7 goals); All: Kris Boyd (7 goals)
- Highest home attendance: 20,438 all home games
- Lowest home attendance: 5,489 vs Cal FC; May 30, 2012
- Average home league attendance: 20,438 MLS; 19,608All
Primary colors	Secondary colors	Third colors

The 2012 Portland Timbers season was the 2nd season for the Portland Timbers in Major League Soccer (MLS), the top flight professional soccer league in the United States and Canada. The season ended with a 1–1 tie with San Jose on October 27, an MLS record of 8-10-16, and elimination from the MLS Cup at 8th place in the western conference and 17th in the overall MLS regular season standings. The Timbers won the 2012 Cascadia Cup with a record of 3-1-2 against Seattle and Vancouver. Including all previous teams in the area to bear the "Timbers" name, this is the 26th season in the history of the Portland Timbers franchise.

== Background ==
On July 9, Portland Timbers parted company with John Spencer. Gavin Wilkinson was then appointed as manager until the end of the season.

== Preseason ==
=== California training camp ===
February 7, 2012	Los Angeles Galaxy	1–4	Portland Timbers	Carson, California
10:30 (PST)	Keat 80'	Report	8' Dike; 9' Perlaza; 67' Marcelin; 85' (pen.) Danso	Stadium: The Home Depot Center

February 10, 2012	Montreal Impact	0–0	Portland Timbers	Carson, California
10:30 (PST)		Report		Stadium: The Home Depot Center

February 12, 2012	Houston Dynamo	0–2	Portland Timbers	Carson, California
10:30 (PST)		Report	63' Jewsbury; 86' Marcelin	Stadium: The Home Depot Center

February 15, 2012	Chicago Fire	0–2	Portland Timbers	Carson, California
11:00 (PST)		Report	64' Alexander; 113' Perlaza	Stadium: The Home Depot Center

=== Return to Portland ===
February 23, 2012	Portland Timbers	1–0	Oregon State Beavers (NCAA)	Portland, Oregon
19:30 (PST)	Mosquera 84'	Report		Stadium: Jeld-Wen Field

=== Portland Timbers Tournament ===
Pos	Team	Pld	W	D	L	GF	GA	GD	Pts
1	San Jose Earthquakes	3	1	2	0	5	4	+1	5
2	Portland Timbers	3	1	2	0	3	2	+1	5
3	AIK	3	1	1	1	2	0	+2	4
4	Chivas USA	3	0	1	2	1	8	−7	1

February 27, 2012	Portland Timbers	1–1	San Jose Earthquakes	Portland, Oregon
19:30 (PST)	Alhassan 15'	Report	59' (o.g.) Mosquera	Stadium: Jeld-Wen Field; Attendance: 16,118; Referee: Drew Fischer (CAN)

March 1, 2012	Portland Timbers	1–1	Chivas USA	Portland, Oregon
19:30 (PST)	Kawulok 78'	Report	21' Romero	Stadium: Jeld-Wen Field; Attendance: 15,195; Referee: Chris Penso (USA)

March 4, 2012	Portland Timbers	1–0	AIK	Portland, Oregon
17:00 (PST)	Boyd 7'	Report		Stadium: Jeld-Wen Field; Attendance: 17,357; Referee: (USA)

== Regular season ==
March 12, 2012 MLS 1	Portland Timbers	3–1	Philadelphia Union	Portland, Oregon
18:55 (PDT)	Jean-Baptiste 54'; Boyd 66'; Alhassan 76'	Report	51' Gómez	Stadium: Jeld-Wen Field; Attendance: 20,438 (SO); Referee: Baldomero Toledo (USA)

March 17, 2012 MLS 2	FC Dallas	1–1	Portland Timbers	Frisco, Texas
17:30 (PDT)	Pérez 22'	Report	51' Nagbe	Stadium: FC Dallas Stadium; Attendance: 12,203; Referee: Jorge Gonzalez (USA)

March 24, 2012 MLS 3	New England Revolution	1–0	Portland Timbers	Foxborough, Massachusetts
13:00 (PDT)	Sène 1'	Report		Stadium: Gillette Stadium; Attendance: 12,925; Referee: Hilario Grajeda (USA)

March 31, 2012 MLS 4	Portland Timbers	2–3	Real Salt Lake	Portland, Oregon
19:00 (PDT)	Nagbe 49', 67'	Summary	Saborío 40' (pen.); Steele 89'; Beckerman 90+3'	Stadium: Jeld-Wen Field; Attendance: 20,438 (SO); Referee: Mark Geiger(USA)

April 7, 2012 MLS 5	Portland Timbers	1–2	Chivas USA	Portland, Oregon
19:30 (PDT)	Boyd 66'	Summary	Moreno 48'; LaBrocca 82'	Stadium: Jeld-Wen Field; Attendance: 20,438 (SO); Referee: Chris Penso (USA)

April 14, 2012 MLS 6	Los Angeles Galaxy	3–1	Portland Timbers	Carson, California
19:30 (PDT)	Donovan 44'; Juninho 83'; Beckham 90+1'	Summary	Boyd 23'	Stadium: The Home Depot Center; Attendance: 22,143; Referee: Jair Marrufo (USA)

April 21, 2012 MLS 7	Portland Timbers	1–0	Sporting Kansas City	Portland, Oregon
19:30 (PDT)	Myers 42' (o.g.)	Summary		Stadium: Jeld-Wen Field; Attendance: 20,438; Referee: Hilario Grajeda (USA)

April 28, 2012 MLS 8	Montreal Impact	2–0	Portland Timbers	Montreal, Quebec, Canada
11:00 (PDT)	Corradi 78' (pen.); Ubiparipović 84'	Summary		Stadium: Olympic Stadium; Attendance: 19,223; Referee: Jorge Gonzalez (USA)

May 5, 2012 MLS 9	Portland Timbers	0–0	Columbus Crew	Portland, Oregon
19:30 (PDT)	Palmer (yellow card) 50'; Songo'o (yellow card) 75'; Chara (yellow card) 77'	Report	Miranda (yellow card) 57'	Stadium: Jeld-Wen Field; Attendance: 20,438 (SO); Referee: Edvin Jurisevic (USA)

May 15, 2012 MLS 10	Houston Dynamo	0–0	Portland Timbers	Houston, Texas
17:30 (PDT)		Report	Kris Boyd (yellow card) 92'	Stadium: BBVA Compass Stadium; Attendance: 22,039; Referee: Chris Penso (USA)

May 20, 2012 MLS 11	Portland Timbers	2–1	Chicago Fire	Portland, Oregon
16:00 (PDT)	Brunner 20'; Pause 53' (o.g.)	Summary	Anibaba 39'	Stadium: Jeld-Wen Field; Attendance: 20,438 (SO); Referee: Silviu Petrescu (Canada)

May 23, 2012 Friendly	Portland Timbers	0–1	Valencia	Portland, Oregon
17:30 (PDT)		Report	Aduriz 41'	Stadium: Jeld-Wen Field; Attendance: 19,564; Referee: (USA)

May 26, 2012 MLS 12 / CC	Portland Timbers	1–1	Vancouver Whitecaps FC	Portland, Oregon
19:00 (PDT)	Boyd 67'	Summary	Mattocks 84'	Stadium: Jeld-Wen Field; Attendance: 20,438 (SO); Referee: Jorge Gonzalez (USA)

May 30, 2012 USOC R3	Portland Timbers	0–1 (a.e.t.)	Cal FC	Portland, Oregon
19:30 (PDT)		Report	Aghasyan 95'	Stadium: Jeld-Wen Field; Attendance: 5,489; Referee: Will Niccolls (USA)

June 17, 2012 MLS 13	Los Angeles Galaxy	1–0	Portland Timbers	Carson, California
16:00 (PDT)	Dunivant 61'	Summary		Stadium: The Home Depot Center; Attendance: 20,611; Referee: Geoff Gamble (Canada)

June 24, 2012 MLS 14 / CC	Portland Timbers	2–1	Seattle Sounders FC	Portland, Oregon
14:00 (PDT)	Boyd 16'; Horst 26'; Palmer (red card) 90'	Summary	Johnson 58'; Montero (red card) 90'	Stadium: Jeld-Wen Field; Attendance: 20,438 (SO); Referee: Ricardo Salazar (USA)

June 30, 2012 MLS 15	Colorado Rapids	3–0	Portland Timbers	Commerce City, Colorado
18:00 (PDT)	Castrillón 18'; Casey 26'; Smith 89'	Summary		Stadium: Dick's Sporting Goods Park; Attendance: 15,553; Referee: Chris Penso (USA)

July 3, 2012 MLS 16	Portland Timbers	2–1	San Jose Earthquakes	Portland, Oregon
19:30 (PDT)	Mwanga 29'; Jewsbury 60'	Summary	Gordon	Stadium: Jeld-Wen Field; Attendance: 20,438 (SO); Referee: Fotis Bazakos (USA)

July 7, 2012 MLS 17	Real Salt Lake	3–0	Portland Timbers	Sandy, Utah
18:00 (PDT)	Saborío 58', 62', 75'	Summary	Chará (yellow card) 65' (red card) 74'	Stadium: Rio Tinto Stadium; Attendance: 16,444; Referee: Mark Geiger (USA)

July 14, 2012 MLS 18	Portland Timbers	3–5	Los Angeles Galaxy	Portland, Oregon
20:00 (PDT)	Boyd 3', 70'; Kimura 35'	Summary	Beckham 20', 25'; Donovan 26' (pen.); Keane 29', 64'	Stadium: Jeld-Wen Field; Attendance: 20,438 (SO); Referee: Baldomero Toledo (USA)

July 18, 2012 MLS 19	Chivas USA	1–0	Portland Timbers	Carson, California
13:00 (PDT)	Bolaños 16'	Summary		Stadium: The Home Depot Center; Attendance: 13,827; Referee: Armando Villarreal (USA)

July 21, 2012 MLS 20	FC Dallas	5–0	Portland Timbers	Frisco, Texas
18:00 (PDT)	Mosquera 16' (o.g.); Jacobson 26'; Jackson 47'; Sealy 69'; Luna 81'	Soccerway		Stadium: FC Dallas Stadium; Attendance: 11,365; Referee: Sorin Stoica (USA)

July 24, 2012 Friendly	Portland Timbers	2–2 (4–5 p)	Aston Villa	Portland, Oregon
19:30 (PDT)	Rincón 76'; Wallace 81'	Report	Clark 42'; Lowton 80'	Stadium: Jeld-Wen Field; Attendance: 20,438; Referee: Juan Guzman (USA)
	Penalties
	Rincón (penalty scored); Jean-Baptiste (penalty scored); Songo'o (penalty scored); Renken (penalty scored); Dike (penalty missed)		(penalty scored) Bannan; (penalty scored) Lichaj; (penalty scored) Gardner; (penalty scored) N'Zogbia; (penalty scored) Carruthers

July 28, 2012 MLS 21	Portland Timbers	0–1	Chivas USA	Portland, Oregon
20:00 (PDT)		Summary	Califf 68'	Stadium: Jeld-Wen Field; Attendance: 20,438; Referee: Silviu Petrescu (Canada)

August 5, 2012 MLS 22	Portland Timbers	1–1	FC Dallas	Portland, Oregon
16:00 (PDT)	Jewsbury 79'	Summary	Sealy 51'; Loyd (yellow card) 37' (red card) 52'	Stadium: Jeld-Wen Field; Attendance: 20,438; Referee: Ricardo Salazar (USA)

August 15, 2012 MLS 23	Toronto FC	2–2	Portland Timbers	Toronto, Ontario, Canada
16:00 (PDT)	Hassli 57'; Silva 63'	Summary	Zizzo 21'; Nagbe 82'	Stadium: BMO Field; Attendance: 18,773; Referee: Geoff Gamble (CAN)

August 19, 2012 MLS 24	New York Red Bulls	3–2	Portland Timbers	Harrison, New Jersey
16:00 (PDT)	Cooper 43'; Cahill 45'; Pearce 83'	Summary	Dike 8'; Nagbe 32'	Stadium: Red Bull Arena; Attendance: 19,043; Referee: Jasen Anno (USA)

August 25, 2012 MLS 25 / CC	Portland Timbers	2–1	Vancouver Whitecaps FC	Portland, Oregon
19:30 (PDT)	Nagbe 41'; Songo'o 55'	Summary	Miller 45+2'; Mattocks (red card) 84'	Stadium: Jeld-Wen Field; Attendance: 20,438; Referee: Geoff Gamble (Canada)

August 31, 2012 MLS 26	Portland Timbers	1–0	Colorado Rapids	Portland, Oregon
19:30 (PDT)	Dike 45'	Summary		Stadium: Jeld-Wen Field; Attendance: 20,438; Referee: Jair Marrufo (USA)

September 5, 2012 MLS 27	Colorado Rapids	3–0	Portland Timbers	Commerce City, Colorado
18:00 (PDT)	Akpan 6'; Cascio 27'; Castrillón 86'	Summary		Stadium: Dick's Sporting Goods Park; Attendance: 13,086; Referee: Juan Guzmán (USA)

September 15, 2012 MLS 28 / CC	Portland Timbers	1–1	Seattle Sounders FC	Portland, Oregon
12:30 (PDT)	Wallace 78'	Summary	Montero 57'	Stadium: Jeld-Wen Field; Attendance: 20,438; Referee: Ricardo Salazar (USA)

September 19, 2012 MLS 29	San Jose Earthquakes	2–2	Portland Timbers	Santa Clara, California
19:30 (PDT)	Wondolowski 73', 90+2'	Summary	Mwanga 45', 62'	Stadium: Buck Shaw Stadium; Attendance: 20,438; Referee: Ricardo Salazar (USA)

September 22, 2012 MLS 30	Real Salt Lake	2–1	Portland Timbers	Sandy, Utah
17:00 (PDT)	Espíndola 14'; Morales 36'	Summary	Dike 61'	Stadium: Rio Tinto Stadium; Attendance: 20,524; Referee: Kevin Stott (USA)

September 29, 2012 MLS 31	Portland Timbers	1–1	D.C. United	Portland, Oregon
19:30 (PDT)	Dike 79'		Pontius 60' (pen.)	Stadium: Jeld-Wen Field; Attendance: 20,438; Referee: Michael Kennedy (USA)

October 7, 2012 MLS 32 / CC	Seattle Sounders FC	3–0	Portland Timbers	Seattle
18:00 (PDT)	Danso 25' (o.g.); Johnson 28'; Montero 62'	Summary		Stadium: CenturyLink Field; Attendance: 66,452; Referee: Jair Marrufo (USA)

October 21, 2012 MLS 33 / CC	Vancouver Whitecaps FC	0–1	Portland Timbers	Vancouver, British Columbia, Canada
16:00 (PDT)		Summary	Jewsbury 39'	Stadium: BC Place; Attendance: 21,000; Referee: Juan Guzmán (USA)

October 27, 2012 MLS 34	Portland Timbers	1–1	San Jose Earthquakes	Portland, OR
15:30 (PDT)	Dike 67'	Report	Wondolowski 24' (pen.)	Stadium: Jeld-Wen Field; Attendance: 20,438; Referee: Mark Geiger (USA)

== Competitions ==
Competition	Started round	Final position / round	First match	Last match
Major League Soccer	—	17th	March 12, 2012	October 27, 2012
U.S. Open Cup	Third round	Third round	May 29, 2012	May 29, 2012
Cascadia Cup	—	1st	May 26, 2012	October 21, 2012

Updated to match played March 18, 2012
Source: Competitions

=== Major League Soccer ===
==== Western Conference standings ====
Pos	Team	Pld	W	L	T	GF	GA	GD	Pts	Qualification
1	San Jose Earthquakes	34	19	6	9	72	43	+29	66	Qualification for the conference semifinals
2	Real Salt Lake	34	17	11	6	46	35	+11	57	Qualification for the conference semifinals
3	Seattle Sounders FC	34	15	8	11	51	33	+18	56	Qualification for the conference semifinals
4	LA Galaxy	34	16	12	6	59	47	+12	54	Qualification for the knockout round
5	Vancouver Whitecaps FC	34	11	13	10	35	41	−6	43	Qualification for the knockout round
6	FC Dallas	34	9	13	12	42	47	−5	39	
7	Colorado Rapids	34	11	19	4	44	50	−6	37	
8	Portland Timbers	34	8	16	10	34	56	−22	34	
9	Chivas USA	34	7	18	9	24	58	−34	30	

Source: MLS

==== Overall standings ====
Pos	Team	Pld	W	L	T	GF	GA	GD	Pts	
1	San Jose Earthquakes (S)	34	19	6	9	72	43	+29	66	Qualification for the CONCACAF Champions League
2	Sporting Kansas City (U)	34	18	7	9	42	27	+15	63	Qualification for the CONCACAF Champions League
3	D.C. United	34	17	10	7	53	43	+10	58	
4	New York Red Bulls	34	16	9	9	57	46	+11	57	
5	Real Salt Lake	34	17	11	6	46	35	+11	57	
6	Chicago Fire	34	17	11	6	46	41	+5	57	
7	Seattle Sounders FC	34	15	8	11	51	33	+18	56	
8	LA Galaxy (C)	34	16	12	6	59	47	+12	54	Qualification for the CONCACAF Champions League
9	Houston Dynamo	34	14	9	11	48	41	+7	53	Qualification for the CONCACAF Champions League
10	Columbus Crew	34	15	12	7	44	44	0	52	
11	Vancouver Whitecaps FC	34	11	13	10	35	41	−6	43	
12	Montreal Impact	34	12	16	6	45	51	−6	42	Qualification for the CONCACAF Champions League
13	FC Dallas	34	9	13	12	42	47	−5	39	
14	Colorado Rapids	34	11	19	4	44	50	−6	37	
15	Philadelphia Union	34	10	18	6	37	45	−8	36	
16	New England Revolution	34	9	17	8	39	44	−5	35	
17	Portland Timbers	34	8	16	10	34	56	−22	34	
18	Chivas USA	34	7	18	9	24	58	−34	30	
19	Toronto FC (V)	34	5	21	8	36	62	−26	23	

Source: MLS
Rules for classification: 1) points; 2) head-to-head record; 3) goal difference; 4) number of goals scored
(C) MLS Cup champions; (S) Supporters' Shield winners; (U) U.S. Open Cup winners; (V) Canadian Championship winners

==== Results summary ====
Overall								Home						Away					
Pld	Pts	W	L	T	GF	GA	GD	W	L	T	GF	GA	GD	W	L	T	GF	GA	GD
34	34	8	16	10	35	55	−20	7	4	6	25	20	+5	1	12	4	10	35	−25

Last updated: October 29, 2012
Source: Portland Timbers
Pld = Matches played; Pts = Points; W = Matches won; T = Matches tied; L = Matches lost; GF = Goals for; GA = Goals against; GD = Goal difference

==== Results by round ====
Round	1	2	3	4	5	6	7	8	9	10	11	12	13	14	15	16	17	18	19	20	21	22	23	24	25	26	27	28	29	30	31	32	33	34
Stadium	H	A	A	H	H	A	H	A	H	A	H	H	A	H	A	H	A	H	A	A	H	H	A	A	H	H	A	H	A	A	H	A	A	H
Result	W	D	L	L	L	L	W	L	D	D	W	D	L	W	L	W	L	L	L	L	L	D	D	L	W	W	L	D	D	L	D	L	W	D

Updated to match(es) played on October 29, 2012. Source: Portland Timbers
A = Away; H = Home; W = Win; D = Draw; L = Loss

=== U.S. Open Cup ===
==== Cup bracket ====
3rd Round
MLS	Portland Timbers	0
USASA	Cal FC (aet)	1
MLS	Seattle Sounders FC	5
NASL	Atlanta Silverbacks	1

4th Round
MLS	Seattle Sounders FC	5
USASA	Cal FC	0

==== Third round ====
May 30, 2012
7:30 PM PDT
Third Round

Portland Timbers	0–1	Cal FC
	Report	Aghasyan 95'

Jeld-Wen Field, Portland, Oregon
Attendance: 5,489
Referee: Will Niccolls (USA)

=== Cascadia Cup ===
The Cascadia Cup is a trophy that was created in 2004 by supporters of the Portland Timbers, Seattle Sounders FC and Vancouver Whitecaps FC. It is awarded to the club with the best record in league games versus the other participants.

Pos	Team	GP	W	L	D	GF	GA	GD	Pts
1	Portland Timbers	6	3	1	2	7	7	0	11
2	Seattle Sounders FC	6	2	1	3	9	5	+4	9
3	Vancouver Whitecaps FC	6	0	3	3	4	8	-4	3

=== 2012 Reserve League ===
Pos	Club	Pld	W	L	T	GF	GA	GD	Pts
1	Los Angeles Galaxy Reserves (C)	10	6	3	1	22	11	+11	19
2	San Jose Earthquakes Reserves	10	5	3	2	15	12	+3	17
3	Seattle Sounders Reserves	10	4	5	1	18	19	-1	13
3	Portland Timbers Reserves	10	4	5	1	17	18	-1	13
5	Chivas USA Reserves	10	3	4	3	21	21	0	12
6	Vancouver Whitecaps Reserves	10	3	5	2	11	22	−11	11

== Club ==
=== Kits ===
Primary	Primary Alt.	Secondary	Third

Type	Shirt	Shorts	Socks	First appearance / Info
Primary	Green / White sleeves	White	Green	
Primary Alt.	Green / White sleeves	Green	Green	MLS, July 18 against Chivas USA
Secondary	Red / White sleeves	White	Red	
Third	White	White	White	

=== Executive staff ===
Majority Owner & President	Merritt Paulson
Chief Operating Officer	Mike Golub
General Manager / Technical Director	Gavin Wilkinson
Ground (capacity and dimensions)	Jeld-Wen Field (20,438 / 110x70 yards)

Updated to match played January 23, 2012
Source: Portland Timbers

=== Coaching staff ===
Position	Staff
Head Coach	John Spencer
Assistant Coach	Amos Magee
Assistant Coach	Cameron Knowles
Goalkeeping Coach	Mike Toshack
Fitness Coach	John Ireland
Head Athletic Trainer	Nik Wald
Assistant Athletic Trainer	Jun Morishita

Last updated: January 26, 2012
Source: Portland Timbers

== Squad ==
=== Roster ===
Note: Flags indicate national team as defined under FIFA eligibility rules; some limited exceptions apply. Players may hold more than one non-FIFA nationality. Squad correct as of August 7, 2012.

No.	Pos.	Nation	Player
1	GK	JAM	Donovan Ricketts
2	FW	USA	Mike Fucito
4	DF	NZL	Ian Hogg
5	DF	USA	Eric Brunner
6	MF	LBR	Darlington Nagbe (GA)
7	MF	USA	Sal Zizzo
8	MF	CMR	Franck Songo'o
9	FW	SCO	Kris Boyd (DP)
10	FW	COD	Danny Mwanga
11	MF	GHA	Kalif Alhassan
12	DF	USA	David Horst
13	MF	USA	Jack Jewsbury (captain)
14	DF	SCO	Steven Smith
15	DF	JPN	Kosuke Kimura
16	FW	USA	Brent Richards (HGP)
17	MF	USA	Eric Alexander
18	DF	USA	Ryan Kawulok
19	FW	USA	Bright Dike
20	FW	COL	José Adolfo Valencia (on loan from Santa Fe)
21	MF	COL	Diego Chará (DP)
22	DF	CRC	Rodney Wallace
23	GK	USA	Joe Bendik
24	FW	COL	Sebastián Rincón (on loan from CA Atenas)
25	DF	ESA	Steve Purdy
26	MF	USA	Charles Renken
27	DF	USA	Chris Taylor
28	MF	USA	Freddie Braun
30	DF	JAM	Lovel Palmer
33	DF	COL	Hanyer Mosquera
35	DF	USA	Andrew Jean-Baptiste (on loan to Los Angeles Blues / GA)
90	GK	NZL	Jake Gleeson
98	DF	GAM	Mamadou Danso

=== Statistics ===
==== Appearances and goals ====
All players contracted to the club during the season included.

As of October 22, 2012

No.	Pos	Nat	Player	Total		Major League Soccer		U.S. Open Cup	
No.	Pos	Nat	Player	Apps	Goals	Apps	Goals	Apps	Goals
1	GK	(Jamaica) JAM	Donovan Ricketts	9	0	9+0	0	0+0	0
2	FW	(United States) USA	Mike Fucito	12	0	3+9	0	0+0	0
4	DF	(New Zealand) NZL	Ian Hogg	0	0	0+0	0	0+0	0
5	DF	(United States) USA	Eric Brunner	13	1	10+3	1	0+0	0
6	MF	(Liberia) LBR	Darlington Nagbe	34	6	31+2	6	1+0	0
7	MF	(United States) USA	Sal Zizzo	19	1	12+7	1	0+0	0
8	MF	(Cameroon) CMR	Franck Songo'o	27	1	21+6	1	0+0	0
9	FW	(Scotland) SCO	Kris Boyd	27	7	22+4	7	1+0	0
10	FW	(Democratic Republic of the Congo) COD	Danny Mwanga	18	3	7+11	3	0+0	0
11	MF	(Ghana) GHA	Kalif Alhassan	17	1	10+6	1	1+0	0
12	DF	(United States) USA	David Horst	23	1	20+2	1	1+0	0
13	MF	(United States) USA	Jack Jewsbury	33	3	31+1	3	1+0	0
14	DF	(Scotland) SCO	Steven Smith	23	0	22+0	0	1+0	0
15	DF	(Japan) JPN	Kosuke Kimura	17	1	16+1	1	0+0	0
16	FW	(United States) USA	Brent Richards	7	0	2+4	0	0+1	0
17	MF	(United States) USA	Eric Alexander	24	0	13+10	0	1+0	0
18	DF	(United States) USA	Ryan Kawulok	1	0	0+0	0	0+1	0
19	FW	(United States) USA	Bright Dike	12	5	9+3	5	0+0	0
20	FW	(Colombia) COL	José Adolfo Valencia	0	0	0+0	0	0+0	0
21	MF	(Colombia) COL	Diego Chará	29	0	28+0	0	1+0	0
22	DF	(Costa Rica) CRC	Rodney Wallace	19	1	14+5	1	0+0	0
23	GK	(United States) USA	Joe Bendik	5	0	3+2	0	0+0	0
25	DF	(El Salvador) ESA	Steve Purdy	3	0	3+0	0	0+0	0
26	MF	(United States) USA	Charles Renken	0	0	0+0	0	0+0	0
27	DF	(United States) USA	Chris Taylor	0	0	0+0	0	0+0	0
28	MF	(United States) USA	Freddie Braun	4	0	0+3	0	0+1	0
30	DF	(Jamaica) JAM	Lovel Palmer	19	0	15+4	0	0+0	0
33	DF	(Colombia) COL	Hanyer Mosquera	27	0	25+1	0	1+0	0
35	DF	(United States) USA	Andrew Jean-Baptiste	5	1	4+1	1	0+0	0
90	GK	(New Zealand) NZL	Jake Gleeson	0	0	0+0	0	0+0	0
98	DF	(The Gambia) GAM	Mamadou Danso	10	0	9+1	0	0+0	0
Players who appeared for Portland no longer at the club:
1	GK	(United States) USA	Troy Perkins	23	0	22+0	0	1+0	0
4	DF	(United States) USA	Mike Chabala	10	0	7+3	0	0+0	0
10	FW	(England) ENG	Eddie Johnson	0	0	0+0	0	0+0	0
14	MF	(Haiti) HAI	James Marcelin	3	0	0+3	0	0+0	0
15	FW	(Colombia) COL	Jorge Perlaza	11	0	6+4	0	1+0	0

==== Top scorers ====
Players with 1 goal or more included only.

As of September 20, 2012

Rk.	Nat	Pos	Player	Total	Major League Soccer	U.S. Open Cup
1	(Scotland)	FW	Kris Boyd	7	7	0
2	(Liberia)	MF	Darlington Nagbe	6	6	0
3	(United States)	FW	Bright Dike	5	5	0
4	(Democratic Republic of the Congo)	FW	Danny Mwanga	3	3	0
4	(United States)	MF	Jack Jewsbury	3	3	0
6			Own goal	2	2	0
7	(Ghana)	MF	Kalif Alhassan	1	1	0
7	(United States)	DF	Andrew Jean-Baptiste	1	1	0
7	(United States)	DF	Eric Brunner	1	1	0
7	(United States)	DF	David Horst	1	1	0
7	(Japan)	DF	Kosuke Kimura	1	1	0
7	(United States)	MF	Sal Zizzo	1	1	0
7	(Cameroon)	MF	Franck Songo'o	1	1	0
7	(Costa Rica)	DF	Rodney Wallace	1	1	0
			TOTALS	34	34	0

==== Disciplinary record ====
Players with 1 card or more included only.

As of September 20, 2012

No.	Nat	Pos	Player	Total		Major League Soccer		U.S. Open Cup	
No.	Nat	Pos	Player	Yellow card	Red card	Yellow card	Red card	Yellow card	Red card
5	(United States)	DF	Eric Brunner	1	0	1	0	0	0
7	(United States)	MF	Sal Zizzo	2	0	2	0	0	0
8	(Cameroon)	MF	Franck Songo'o	8	0	8	0	0	0
9	(Scotland)	FW	Kris Boyd	3	0	3	0	0	0
11	(Ghana)	MF	Kalif Alhassan	1	0	1	0	0	0
12	(Scotland)	DF	David Horst	1	0	1	0	0	0
13	(United States)	MF	Jack Jewsbury	5	0	5	0	0	0
14	(Scotland)	DF	Steven Smith	6	0	6	0	0	0
14	(Haiti)	MF	James Marcelin	1	0	1	0	0	0
15	(Japan)	DF	Kosuke Kimura	1	0	1	0	0	0
17	(United States)	MF	Eric Alexander	1	0	1	0	0	0
21	(Colombia)	MF	Diego Chará	10	1	10	1	0	0
22	(Costa Rica)	DF	Rodney Wallace	2	0	2	0	0	0
25	(El Salvador)	DF	Steve Purdy	1	0	1	0	0	0
30	(Jamaica)	DF	Lovel Palmer	4	1	4	1	0	0
33	(Colombia)	DF	Hanyer Mosquera	4	0	4	0	0	0
98	(The Gambia)	DF	Mamadou Danso	2	0	2	0	0	0
			TOTALS	51	2	51	2	0	0

==== Goalkeeper stats ====
All goalkeepers included.
Last updated: March 18, 2012

No.	Nat	Player	Total				Major League Soccer				U.S. Open Cup			
No.	Nat	Player	MIN	GA	GAA	SV	MIN	GA	GAA	SV	MIN	GA	GAA	SV
1	(United States)	Troy Perkins	1177	14	1.07	39	1057	13	1.11	37	120	1	1	2
23	(United States)	Joe Bendik	23	2	—	0	23	2	—	0	0	0	—	0
90	(New Zealand)	Jake Gleeson	0	0	—	0	0	0	—	0	0	0	—	0
		TOTALS	540	10	1.60	14	540	10	1.60	14	0	0	—	0

=== Player movement ===
==== Transfers in ====
Date	Nation	Pos	Previous club	Fee/notes	Ref
January 4, 2012	(United States) Brent Richards (R)	FW	(United States) Washington Huskies (United States) Portland Timbers U23's	Signed as Home Grown Player	
January 12, 2012	(United States) Andrew Jean-Baptiste (R)	DF	(United States) Connecticut Huskies	SuperDraft, 1st round; signed to Generation adidas contract prior to draft	
January 17, 2012	(Colombia) Hanyer Mosquera	DF	(Colombia) La Equidad	Free	
January 30, 2012	(Scotland) Kris Boyd	FW	(Turkey) Eskişehirspor	Free, MLS rights acquired from Houston Dynamo for a 2013 1st round SuperDraft pick; signed to Designated Player contract	
January 31, 2012	(United States) Charles Renken (R)	MF	(Germany) 1899 Hoffenheim	Free, MLS rights acquired via waivers	
February 16, 2012	(Cameroon) Franck Songo'o	MF	(Spain) Albacete	Free	
February 24, 2012	(United States) Joe Bendik	GK	(Norway) Sogndal	Free	
March 1, 2012	(United States) Ryan Kawulok (R)	MF	(United States) Portland Pilots (United States) Portland Timbers U23's	Supplemental Draft, 1st round	
April 25, 2012	(Scotland) Steven Smith	DF	(England) Preston North End	Free	
June 6, 2012	(Democratic Republic of the Congo) Danny Mwanga	FW	(United States) Philadelphia Union	Trade for Jorge Perlaza	
July 5, 2012	(Japan) Kosuke Kimura	DF	(United States) Colorado Rapids	Trade for allocation money and an international slot	
August 7, 2012	(Jamaica) Donovan Ricketts	GK	(Canada) Montreal Impact	Trade for Troy Perkins	
August 9, 2012	(New Zealand) Ian Hogg	DF	(New Zealand) Auckland City		

==== Loans in ====
Date	Player	Pos	Previous club	Fee/notes	Ref
February 3, 2012	(Colombia) José Adolfo Valencia	FW	(Colombia) Santa Fe	One year loan; initially signed to Designated Player contract on December 15, 2011, but failed team physical (knee); full transfer (undisclosed fee) and original DP contract will take effect upon full recovery from knee surgery; placed on disabled list and will not count against roster during 2012 season	

==== Transfers out ====
Date	Player	Pos	Destination club	Fee/notes	Ref
November 28, 2011	(United States) Kevin Goldthwaite	DF	N/A	Retired	
November 28, 2011	(United States) Adin Brown	GK	N/A	Contract expired, team option not exercised	
November 28, 2011	(United States) Rodrigo López	MF	N/A	Contract expired, team option not exercised	
November 28, 2011	(United States) Peter Lowry	MF	N/A	Contract expired, team option not exercised	
November 28, 2011	(United States) Ryan Pore	MF	N/A	Contract expired, team option not exercised	
November 28, 2011	(United States) Spencer Thompson	FW	N/A	Contract expired, team option not exercised	
January 12, 2012	(United States) Kenny Cooper	FW	(United States) New York Red Bulls	Traded for a 2013 1st round SuperDraft pick and allocation money	
August 7, 2012	(United States) Troy Perkins	GK	(Canada) Montreal Impact	Trade for Donovan Ricketts	
August 9, 2012	(United States) Mike Chabala	DF	(United States) D.C. United	Trade for a first round 2014 MLS Supplemental Draft pick	

==== Loans out ====
Date	Player	Pos	Destination club	Fee/notes	Ref

==== Unsigned draft picks ====
Date	Player	Pos	Previous club	Notes	Ref
January 12, 2012	(United States) Brendan King	MF	(United States) Notre Dame Fighting Irish (United States) Chicago Fire Premier	SuperDraft, 2nd round; attended training camp, not offered a contract	
January 17, 2012	(United States) Miguel Ibarra	MF	(United States) UC Irvine Anteaters (United States) Orange County Blue Star	Supplemental Draft, 2nd round; attended training camp, not offered a contract	
January 17, 2012	(United States) Doug Herrick	GK	(United States) Saint Mary's Gaels (United States) Washington Crossfire	Supplemental Draft, 3rd round; attended training camp, not offered a contract	
January 17, 2012	(United States) Logan McDaniel	MF	(United States) Loyola Marymount Lions (United States) Des Moines Menace	Supplemental Draft, 4th round; injured prior to training camp, not offered a contract	

== Miscellany ==
=== Allocation ranking ===
Portland is in the #8 position in the MLS Allocation Ranking. The allocation ranking is the mechanism used to determine which MLS club has first priority to acquire a U.S. National Team player who signs with MLS after playing abroad, or a former MLS player who returns to the league after having gone to a club abroad for a transfer fee. A ranking can be traded, provided that part of the compensation received in return is another club's ranking.

=== International roster slots ===
Portland has 8 MLS International Roster Slots for use in the 2012 season. Each club in Major League Soccer is allocated 8 international roster slots. Clubs may trade their excess international roster slots to other teams and there is no limit to the amount of slots each team can acquire.

Portland acquired one additional slot for use in the 2011 and 2012 seasons from Los Angeles Galaxy, in exchange for allocation money, to bring their total to 9 for their first two seasons in MLS. The Timbers then traded one of their 2012 slots to the Montreal Impact in exchange for not selecting any Timbers players in the 2011 MLS Expansion Draft and a 2015 MLS Supplemental Draft 4th Round pick.

Prior to the 2012 season, Portland acquired an additional slot from D.C. United for use in the 2012 and 2013 seasons in exchange for allocation money, bringing their total back up to 9 at the start of the 2012 season. In July 2012, Portland traded a slot to Colorado Rapids as part of the Kosuke Kimura deal. That slot returns to Portland after the 2012 season.

=== Future draft pick trades ===
Future picks acquired:

- 2013 MLS SuperDraft Round 1 pick from New York Red Bulls.
- 2014 MLS SuperDraft Round 4 pick from Houston Dynamo.
- 2014 MLS Supplemental Draft Round 1 pick from D.C. United.
- 2015 MLS Supplemental Draft Round 4 pick from Montreal Impact.

Future picks traded:

- 2013 MLS SuperDraft Round 1 pick to Houston Dynamo.
- 2013 MLS SuperDraft Round 2 pick (conditional) to Montreal Impact. This pick may instead turn into use of an international roster slot for the 2013 season, dependent on the performance of Mike Fucito in 2012.
