= 2011 Cascadia Summit =

Tournament details
- Host country: United States
- Dates: March 4–6, 2011
- Teams: 3 (from 1 confederation)
- Venue: 1 (in 1 host city)

Final positions
- Champions: Portland Timbers (1st title)
- Runners-up: Vancouver Whitecaps FC

Tournament statistics
- Matches played: 3
- Goals scored: 9 (3 per match)
- Top scorer: 8 players tied with(1 goal)

The Cascadia Summit was a soccer competition featuring club teams from the Pacific Northwest region of North America. It was held in March 2011 and hosted in Tukwila, Washington, United States.

== History ==
"With ourselves and Portland joining Seattle in MLS, this Summit is a great opportunity to usher in a new era for professional soccer in the Pacific Northwest."

— Bob Lenarduzzi, Vancouver Whitecaps FC president regarding the Cascadia Summit

Based on the Cascadia Cup, the Cascadia Summit was a pre-season tournament between the Major League Soccer teams in the Pacific Northwest region of North America. The three main clubs will also take part in the Cascadia Cup, an annual cup rivalry between Major League Soccer (MLS) teams named after their markets' North American Soccer League (NASL) predecessors. The Seattle Sounders, Portland Timbers and Vancouver Whitecaps rivalry dates back to the NASL days.

== Teams ==
The following five clubs participated in the 2011 tournament:

- Seattle Sounders FC
- Seattle Sounders FC Academy
- Portland Timbers
- Vancouver Whitecaps FC
- Vancouver Whitecaps Residency

== Matches ==
March 4, 2011	Seattle	0–2	Portland	Tukwila, Washington
19:30 PDT	Alonso (yellow card) 5'; Hurtado (yellow card) 54'	Report	Perlaza 21'; Jewsbury (yellow card) 69'; Cooper 93+'	Stadium: Starfire Sports Complex; Attendance: 3,100; Referee: Dave Gantar

March 5, 2011	Portland	1–1	Vancouver	Tukwila, Washington
16:00 PDT	Pore 5'; Moffat (yellow card) 21'; Danso (yellow card) 44'; Marcelin (yellow card) 57'	Report	Horst 36' (o.g.); Wagner (yellow card) 48'; Rochat (yellow card) 53'	Stadium: Starfire Sports Complex; Attendance: 3,100; Referee: Ricardo Salazar

March 6, 2011	Seattle Sounders FC U-18	4–3	Vancouver Whitecaps Residency	Tukwila, Washington
12:00 PDT				Stadium: Starfire Sports Complex
Note: Not included in standings.

March 6, 2011	Seattle	2–3	Vancouver	Tukwila, Washington
15:00 PDT	Graham (yellow card) 10'; Levesque 45'; Montaño 77'	Report	Salgado 6'; Teibert 12'; Khalfan (yellow card) 18'; Camilo 47'; Cannon (yellow card) 81'	Stadium: Starfire Sports Complex; Attendance: 3,100

== Table ==
Pos	Team	Pld	W	D	L	GF	GA	GD	Pts
1	(United States) Portland Timbers	2	1	1	0	3	1	+2	4
2	(Canada) Vancouver Whitecaps FC	2	1	1	0	4	3	+1	4
3	(United States) Seattle Sounders FC	2	0	0	2	2	3	−1	0

== Statistics ==
=== Top scorers ===
Rank	Scorer	Club	Goals
1	(Brazil) Camilo	Vancouver	1
1	(United States) Kenny Cooper	Portland	1
1	(United States) Roger Levesque	Seattle	1
1	(Colombia) Miguel Montaño	Seattle	1
1	(Colombia) Jorge Perlaza	Portland	1
1	(United States) Ryan Pore	Portland	1
1	(United States) Omar Salgado	Vancouver	1
1	(Canada) Russell Teibert	Vancouver	1

=== Top assists ===
Rank	Player	Club	Assists
1	(United States) Kenny Cooper	Portland	2
1	(United States) Patrick Ianni	Seattle	2
1	(Uganda) Brian Umony	Portland	2
2	(Brazil) Camilo	Vancouver	1
2	(United States) David Estrada	Seattle	1
2	(Tanzania) Nizar Khalfan	Vancouver	1
2	(United States) Roger Levesque	Seattle	1
2	(United States) Omar Salgado	Vancouver	1
2	(United States) Zach Scott	Seattle	1
2	(United States) Sal Zizzo	Portland	1

=== Own Goals ===
- David Horst against Vancouver
