= Eddie Johnson (English footballer) =

British footballer (born 1984)

Personal information
- Full name: Edward William Johnson
- Date of birth: 20 September 1984 (age 42)
- Place of birth: Chester, England
- Height: 5 ft 10 in (1.78 m)
- Positions: Midfielder; striker

Youth career
- 1994–1999: Crewe Alexandra
- 1999–2003: Manchester United

Senior career*
Years	Team	Apps	(Gls)
2003–2006	Manchester United	0	(0)
2004	→ Royal Antwerp (loan)	11	(5)
2004–2005	→ Coventry City (loan)	26	(5)
2005–2006	→ Crewe Alexandra (loan)	22	(5)
2006–2008	Bradford City	64	(7)
2008–2009	Chester City	10	(1)
2009–2010	Austin Aztex^{[A]}	48	(19)
2011–2012	Portland Timbers	7	(1)
Total		188	(43)

International career
2001	England U16	3	(1)
- England U18
2002	England U19	3	(2)
2003	England U20	3	(0)

Managerial career
- 2014–: Dundee under-20s
- * Club domestic league appearances and goals

Edward William Johnson (born 20 September 1984) is an English former footballer, who ended his career with Portland Timbers in Major League Soccer. He was a midfielder but also played as a striker and represented his country at the under-16, under-18, under-19 and under-20 levels. He is now employed as under-20s manager for Dundee.

Born in Chester, Johnson began his career with Crewe Alexandra and Manchester United's academies. He had loan spells with Royal Antwerp, Coventry City and Crewe Alexandra, before he was released by Manchester United in 2006 and joined Bradford City, where he played 64 league games in two seasons. He was released from Bradford in 2008, and after initially turning down a move to Chester City, he was given a trial at Crewe, which was unsuccessful, and instead he joined Chester where he spent six months before his contract was terminated to allow him to move to Austin Aztex. His form during two seasons in the United Soccer Leagues First Division won him a transfer to Portland Timbers at the end of the 2010 season.

== Early life ==
Johnson was born in Chester, England, on 20 September 1984. He attended Boughton Heath Primary School, Christleton High School and The Bishops' Blue Coat Church of England High School in the city. Despite growing up as an Everton supporter, Johnson started his football career at Crewe Alexandra's academy at the age of 10. In 1999, he signed for Premier League side Manchester United as a junior player.

== Club career ==
=== Manchester United ===
Johnson signed as a trainee at Manchester United in 2001. Two years later, he was part of their FA Youth Cup-winning team, scoring in the final against Middlesbrough, and had his first involvement with the first team. He made his debut for United on 28 October 2003 against Leeds United when he came on as a 112th-minute substitute in a 3–2 League Cup victory at Elland Road.

Johnson was loaned out to the Belgian club Royal Antwerp in January 2004 where he made 11 appearances, scoring five goals, including a 20-yard strike on his debut against Heusden-Zolder. In July 2004, he was sent on loan to Championship-side Coventry City for the 2004–05 season in order to gain first-team experience. He scored on his Coventry debut in a 2–0 victory against Sunderland on 7 August 2004, before he scored a second later that month in a 4–1 defeat of Nottingham Forest. Johnson did not score again until October, when he scored three times in four games, but they proved to be his last goals of the season. He finished his stay with Coventry with 26 appearances.

In July 2005, Johnson again moved on loan this time returning to Crewe Alexandra in a six-month deal. It took him eight games to score his first goal which came in a 1–1 draw with Plymouth Argyle on 13 September 2005. Three more goals followed by the end of 2005 including one on Boxing Day against Hull City, who then offered him a permanent deal. Hull and Manchester United agreed a fee for Johnson but he decided to extend his loan deal at Crewe until the end of the 2005–06 season. It was not until the last game of the season against Millwall that he scored another to bring his tally to five from 22 games. Having failed to make an impact at Manchester United, Johnson was among seven United players given a free transfer at the end of the 2005–06 season. He was offered a contract at Crewe, but also attracted interest from Barnsley and Bradford City, the latter of whom he joined on a two-year deal in June 2006.

=== Bradford City ===
The start of Johnson's career at League One side Bradford City was marred by an ankle ligament injury in a pre-season friendly at Boston United which was expected to keep him out of the first month of the season. He recovered to make his debut in City's 2006–07 season's opening game at Nottingham Forest as a late substitute. Two weeks later he scored his first Bradford goals by netting twice against his former club Crewe in a 3–0 Bradford victory. Johnson struggled for goals at City, and had only scored another two by the time he was ruled out for a month after going off at half-time against Chesterfield on 16 December 2006 with a shin injury. He returned to the City team after a six-game absence for a Friday night game with Tranmere Rovers, which ended 1–1. He had a goal disallowed against Yeovil Town a week later for offside. Following a poor run of form, City manager Colin Todd was sacked, with his replacement David Wetherall converting Johnson from a striker to a midfielder after an injury to Marc Bridge-Wilkinson. However, City were relegated after a defeat to Chesterfield with Johnson finishing the season with just four goals.

At the start of the 2007–08 season, new manager Stuart McCall continued to employ Johnson in a midfield role, and he was rewarded with goals in back-to-back games and the club's player of the month in September. In November, he was ruled out for 11 weeks because of a back injury, before he was sidelined again when he gashed his shin in his comeback game against Wrexham on 26 January 2008. Johnson returned two weeks later as a second-half substitute against Bury. He was used in his former striker's role later in the season, and scored his sixth league goal in a 1–0 victory over Morecambe on 5 April 2008. Johnson scored again three days later in a 1–1 draw with Barnet, as he tried to secure a new contract with Bradford. However, on 29 April 2008, Johnson was deemed to be surplus to requirements at Valley Parade and was released by manager Stuart McCall along with 13 other Bradford players. McCall said releasing Johnson was one of the hardest decisions in his first year as manager, adding: "It went right down to the wire with Eddie. He's got terrific energy, a good engine and has enjoyed himself at this club." Johnson played a total of 71 games in all competitions for City, scoring eight goals.

=== Chester City ===
In June 2008, Johnson was offered a two-year contract by fellow League Two side Chester City, but two weeks later, he turned down the deal. Instead he returned to Crewe Alexandra on trial after he and his mother went to see coach Dario Gradi, and scored twice in a 4–1 pre-season friendly victory over Quorn on 16 July 2008. Despite spending the rest of the summer with Crewe, the club decided not to offer Johnson a full-time contract, because coach Steve Holland felt he was not better than the club's other forwards.

Instead, Johnson was given another chance with Chester City, with whom he trained in the run up to the start of the 2008–09 season. He scored in a friendly against an Everton reserve team, but despite the club wanting to sign Johnson, the transfer was put on hold because of the club's salary cap. Johnson had to wait a number of weeks to sign for Chester, after a deal to take Paul Rutherford to Northwich Victoria, freeing up money to pay Johnson, failed to go through before the 2008 summer transfer deadline closed. Johnson finally signed for Chester on 15 October, agreeing a two-year contract with his hometown club. His debut came three days later in a home game with Port Vale, with Chester losing 2–1, when he had two opportunities to score and was substituted late in the second half. His first goal for Chester was a consolation goal in a 2–1 defeat to Morecambe on 15 November. He missed four weeks out through injury, which coincided with the club's improvement in form under new manager Mark Wright, until he returned as a last-minute substitute against his former side Bradford City.

=== Austin Aztex ===
The following month, with Chester in financial hardship, Johnson was allowed to talk to United Soccer Leagues First Division side Austin Aztex, managed by Adrian Heath, who was caretaker manager during Johnson's loan spell at Coventry City. Johnson's contract was terminated by Chester City on the final day of the January transfer window to allow him to move to the Austin Aztex. His last game for Chester had been during December; he played just 11 times during his six months with Chester, scoring only once.

Johnson's move to Austin Aztex was finalised in March and completed their initial starting side, which included fellow English players Alex Tapp and Gifton Noel-Williams and Welshman Gareth Evans. Upon Johnson's transfer, team manager Adrian Heath said: "I think it's fair to say that Eddie has lost his way recently and I hope we can get him back on the right path to where he is again one of the bright young players in English football." Johnson played in the club's first game, which was a 2–0 friendly defeat to Major League Soccer's New England Revolution and scored in another pre-season match. Johnson scored his first goal for Austin on 25 April against fellow expansion side the Cleveland City Stars when he scored in the 13th minute of play. Johnson scored his second goal in the final minute of the match. In the 2009 season, Johnson played 22 league matches, scoring five goals making him the Aztex leading goalscorer, but he was forced to miss part of the season because of work permit problems after he returned to England with Evans. Johnson also played in two of the Aztex's three US Open Cup matches, playing in the first round, scoring the second goal in a 2–0 win over Mississippi Brilla and in Austin's 2–0 defeat to Houston Dynamo in the third round. The Austin Chronicle named Johnson the city's best player. The newspaper's citation said: "he's been out there hustling every game and providing leadership and a steadying influence on and off the field. At 24, with a background that includes Manchester United and English national youth teams, he might not be with us much longer, but it's a treat while it lasts." He went on to win one of the club's player of the season awards.

During the close-season, Johnson sought a possible new club back in England, and before the start of the 2010 season in America, he was given a trial with Major League Soccer side Seattle Sounders FC joining them for their pre-season training camp. Having trained with Sounders, Johnson decided to stay with Austin Aztex and signed a new two-year contract. In the first game of the Aztex season, Johnson hit the goalpost with a 20-yard curling shot, but Lawrence Olum scored with the rebound, helping the Aztex to a 2–0 victory against Montreal Impact. During May, Johnson scored five goals, including two in a 3–3 draw with Tampa Bay and made two assists to help Austin record an unbeaten spell. He again scored two goals in a 2–1 Aztex victory over Miami and helped take his team to the top of the table by being the club's leading goalscorer throughout the campaign. Heath also used him in his original position in attack, including as a sole striker in a defeat to Puerto Rico Islanders. It was a result that saw the Aztex lose their top spot for the first time in three months. A week later, Johnson scored his tenth goal of the season to give his side their fourth win in five games by defeating Carolina RailHawks 3–2. The Aztex returned to the top of the table with a 2–0 victory against NSC Minnesota Stars with Johnson scoring the opening goal of the game. Aztex qualified for the end-of-season play-offs where they faced Montreal Impact over two legs. Johnson scored one of Aztex's two goals in the second leg but their season finished with a 5–2 aggregate defeat. Johnson played a total of 28 games during the season, scoring 15 goals, and earned a place in the 2010 season best XI.

=== Portland Timbers ===
Johnson's form for the Aztex attracted the attention of the Portland Timbers, a Major League Soccer expansion side for the 2011 season. At the end of the 2010 league season, Johnson was announced as one of the Timbers first four signings, along with Steve Cronin, Ryan Pore and Bright Dike. Because Portland had second draft pick behind fellow expansion side Vancouver Whitecaps, they announced they had previously signed Johnson, by taking him to their former USL side before the transfer deadline on 14 August and loaning him back to the Aztex for the remainder of the 2010 season. He was listed on the Timbers' roster as a forward. Johnson was a late substitute for Jorge Perlaza in the Timbers' first MLS home game and fourth in all, as they defeated Chicago Fire 4–2 on 15 April 2011.

Johnson announced his retirement on 20 April 2012, the same day that Portland acquired forward Mike Fucito.

== Coaching career ==
=== Dundee ===
In July 2014, Johnson was announced as the new under-20 manager for Dundee.

== International career ==
Johnson has represented England at under-16, under-18, under-19 and 20 levels. His form during his time at Manchester United earned him a place in the England team in the 2003 FIFA World Youth Championship, after scoring twice in a friendly game before the tournament. Johnson played in all three of England's games against Japan, Egypt and Colombia during the tournament in the United Arab Emirates, but England picked up just one point and were eliminated in the group stage.

== Career statistics ==
=== Club ===
Updated to 14 August 2011.

Appearances and goals by club, season and competition
Club	Season	League		Cup		League Cup		Other		Total	
Club	Season	Apps	Goals	Apps	Goals	Apps	Goals	Apps	Goals	Apps	Goals
Manchester United	2003–04	0	0	0	0	1	0	0	0	1	0
Manchester United	2004–05	0	0	0	0	0	0	0	0	0	0
Manchester United	2005–06	0	0	0	0	0	0	0	0	0	0
Manchester United	Total	0	0	0	0	1	0	0	0	1	0
Royal Antwerp (loan)	2003–04	11	5	0	0	–		0	0	11	5
Coventry City (loan)	2004–05	26	5	1	0	2	0	0	0	29	5
Crewe Alexandra (loan)	2005–06	22	5	0	0	1	0	0	0	23	5
Bradford City	2006–07	32	3	3	0	1	1	1^{[B]}	0	37	4
Bradford City	2007–08	32	4	1	0	1	0	0	0	34	4
Bradford City	Total	64	7	4	0	2	1	1	0	71	8
Chester City	2008–09	10	1	1	0	0	0	0	0	11	1
Austin Aztex	2009	22	5	2	1					24	6
Austin Aztex	2010^{[A]}	26	14	1	0			2^{[C]}	1	29	15
Austin Aztex	Total	48	19	3	1			2	1	53	21
Portland Timbers	2011	7	1	0	0					7	1
Portland Timbers	2012	0	0	0	0					0	0
Career total		188	43	9	1	6	1	3	1	206	46

== Honours ==
=== Individual ===
- USSF D-2 Pro League Best XI (1): 2010

== Personal life ==
Johnson married during the off-season between the 2010 and 2011 American League seasons.

== Notes ==
A. ^{a} ^{b} Johnson signed for Portland Timbers before the 2010 transfer deadline and was loaned back to Austin for the remainder of the 2010 season.
B. Johnson played one game for Bradford City in the EFL Trophy during the 2006–07 season.
C. Johnson played two games, scoring one goal, for Austin Aztex in the play-offs during the 2010 season.
