= Steve Cronin =

American soccer player (born 1983)

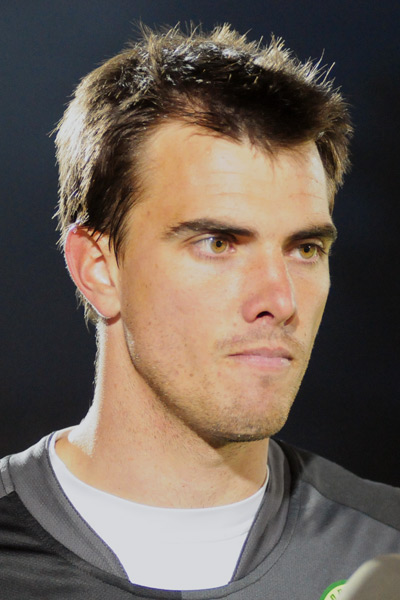

Personal information
- Full name: Steven Michael Cronin
- Date of birth: May 28, 1983 (age 43)
- Place of birth: Sacramento, California, United States
- Height: 6 ft 4 in (1.93 m)
- Position: Goalkeeper

Youth career
- 1999: IMG Soccer Academy
- 2001–2003: Santa Clara Broncos

Senior career*
Years	Team	Apps	(Gls)
2004	San Jose Earthquakes	0	(0)
2005–2008	Los Angeles Galaxy	28	(0)
2009–2010	Portland Timbers	54	(0)
2009	→ D.C. United (loan)	2	(0)
2011	D.C. United	2	(0)

International career
1999	United States U17	1	(0)
2003	United States U20	5	(0)
- * Club domestic league appearances and goals

Steve Michael Cronin (born May 28, 1983) is an American retired soccer player who played as a goalkeeper.

== Career ==
=== College and amateur ===
Cronin was born in Sacramento, California. He played college soccer at Santa Clara University from 2001 to 2003. As a freshman, Cronin started 10 games as a goalkeeper and six in the field, finishing the season with a 0.79 goals against average. For the next two years, Cronin remained solely in goal, starting 27 matches and being named first-team All-West Coast Conference as a junior.

=== Professional ===
Following a tremendous performance with the Under-20 national team in the 2003 FIFA World Youth Championship, Cronin signed a Project-40 contract with MLS. He was selected 10th overall in the 2004 MLS SuperDraft by his hometown San Jose Earthquakes. San Jose had two very competent goalkeepers in front of him, 2003 MLS Goalkeeper of the Year Pat Onstad and Jon Conway, and the young keeper did not get any playing time in the 2004 season.

Cronin was traded to Los Angeles Galaxy in the 2005 off-season in a four-player deal and started several games for the Galaxy. He became the Galaxy's starting goalkeeper after Joe Cannon was traded to the San Jose Earthquakes in January 2008. Cronin signed a multi-year contract extension with Galaxy after the 2008 MLS season, but transferred to Portland Timbers in February 2009.

Cronin joined Major League Soccer side D.C. United on 9 October 2009 on loan from Portland until the end of the 2009 MLS season. His first appearance for DC United was an October 17, 2009 start at home against the Columbus Crew. Cronin made 6 saves and earned a shutout win. Cronin enjoyed a strong season with Portland in 2010 appearing in 28 league matches, in which he posted a .79 goals against average which included 12 shutouts.

On October 19, 2010, Cronin was named as one of the first four players to be signed by the Portland Timbers ahead of their expansion into Major League Soccer in 2011, along with Bright Dike, Ryan Pore and Eddie Johnson.

On December 17, 2010, Cronin was traded from Portland along with allocation money to D.C. United for goalkeeper Troy Perkins. Cronin remained with D.C. through the 2011 season. At season's end, the club declined his 2012 contract option and he entered the 2011 MLS Re-Entry Draft. Cronin was not selected in the draft and became a free agent.

=== International ===
As a teenager, Cronin trained with the United States U17 national team at the USSF's Bradenton Academy, alongside players like Landon Donovan, DaMarcus Beasley, and Bobby Convey. He made his international debut with the team against Sweden on November 26, 1998.

He was called up for the United States national team camp before the game against Sweden on January 19, 2008, but was the only unused substitute in the match.

=== Retirement ===
On April 13, 2012, Cronin announced he was becoming a State Farm insurance agent. He opened his office in Denver, Colorado on March 1, 2013.

== Honors ==
Los Angeles Galaxy

- Major League Soccer MLS Cup: 2005

Portland Timbers

- USL First Division Commissioner's Cup: 2009

Individual

- USL First Division All-League First Team: 2009
