= David Horst =

American soccer player

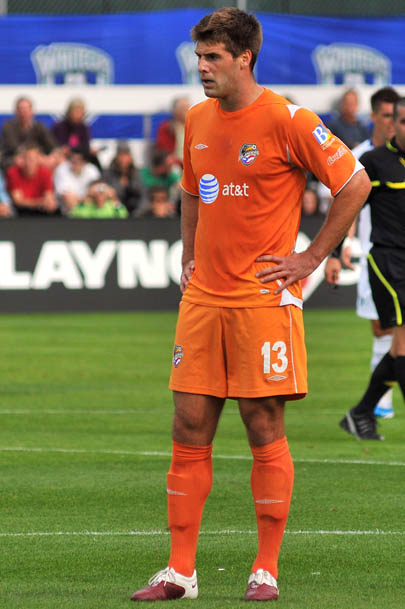

Personal information
- Date of birth: October 25, 1985 (age 41)
- Place of birth: Pine Grove, Pennsylvania, U.S.
- Height: 6 ft 4 in (1.93 m)
- Position: Defender

College career
| Years | Team | Apps | (Gls) |
| 2004–2007 | Old Dominion Monarchs | | |

Senior career*
| Years | Team | Apps | (Gls) |
| 2005 | Reading Rage | 15 | (1) |
| 2006–2007 | Hampton Roads Piranhas | 30 | (1) |
| 2008–2010 | Real Salt Lake | 3 | (0) |
| 2009 | → Austin Aztex (loan) | 10 | (0) |
| 2010 | → Puerto Rico Islanders (loan) | 24 | (3) |
| 2011–2013 | Portland Timbers | 39 | (1) |
| 2014–2016 | Houston Dynamo | 89 | (4) |
| 2017–2018 | Real Salt Lake | 17 | (0) |
| 2017–2018 | → Real Monarchs (loan) | 6 | (0) |
| Total | | 233 | (10) |
- * Club domestic league appearances and goals as of October 15, 2018

David Horst (born October 25, 1985) is an American former soccer player who last played for Real Salt Lake in Major League Soccer.

== Career ==
=== College and amateur ===
Horst played college soccer at Old Dominion University, and in the USL Premier Development League with Reading Rage, Virginia Beach Submariners and the Hampton Roads Piranhas. He was 2007 PDL Defensive Player of the Year.

Horst played four years at Old Dominion University, leading the Monarchs to back-to-back Sweet 16 appearances in the NCAA Men's College Cup. He was named the CAA Defender of the Year in back-to-back seasons, in 2006 and 2007. Horst was recipient of the Norfolk Sports Club's Tom Scott award as ODU's top senior student athlete. In 2007, Horst was named second team All-American by College Soccer News, and was also named NSCAA First team All-Region in 2006 and 2007.

=== Professional ===
Horst was drafted in the first round (14th overall) of the 2008 MLS SuperDraft by Real Salt Lake. He made his full professional debut for RSL on 16 August 2008 against the Houston Dynamo. Horst also spent time with USL-1 club Austin Aztex during the 2009 season.

During April 2010 Horst was sent out on loan to the Puerto Rico Islanders of the USSF Division 2 Professional League. He was sent off on his Islanders debut, on May 26, 2010, in a game against the Carolina RailHawks. On September 30, 2010, the Islanders where down 0–2 on halftime in a CONCACAF Champions League group stage match against Toluca from Mexico, teammate David Foley scored the first goal for the Islanders to make 2–1 in the second half, later, Horst scored the equalizer and the game winner in extra time. On October 2, 2010, Horst scored his first league goal against Miami FC. The Puerto Rico Islanders won the USSF Division 2 Professional League Championship on October 30, 2010, against the Carolina Railhawks.

On November 24, 2010, Horst was selected by Portland Timbers in the 2010 MLS Expansion Draft. Horst impressed during the Timbers' inaugural 2011 season and signed a new contract with the club on November 28, 2011.

On December 17, 2013, Horst was dealt to the Houston Dynamo in exchange for a 4th-round pick in the 2014 MLS SuperDraft. Due to an ankle injury to former Portland teammate Eric Brunner, Horst became a starter for Houston.

In January 2017, Horst resigned with Real Salt Lake as a free agent. Horst suffered a fully ruptured right Achilles tendon in late June 2018 that kept him sidelined for the remainder of the season. On December 5, 2018, Horst retired from professional soccer, with his contract option for the next season declined by the team due to circumstances around his age and injury history.

== Honors ==
=== Puerto Rico Islanders ===
- USSF Division 2 Pro League Champions (1): 2010

=== Post-career ===
On October 27, 2024 Horst was inducted into the Pennsylvania Sports Hall of Fame beside his older sister and older brother.
