= Bright Dike =

Nigeria international footballer (born 1987)

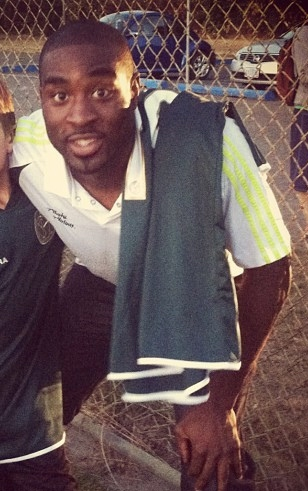
- Dike in 2012

Personal information
- Full name: Chinedu Dike
- Date of birth: 2 February 1987 (age 39)
- Place of birth: Edmond, Oklahoma, United States
- Height: 1.85 m (6 ft 1 in)
- Position: Forward

College career
Years	Team	Apps	(Gls)
2005–2009	Notre Dame Fighting Irish	86	(27)

Senior career*
Years	Team	Apps	(Gls)
2006	Indiana Invaders	3	(0)
2010	Portland Timbers	23	(10)
2011–2013	Portland Timbers	23	(6)
2012	→ Los Angeles Blues (loan)	10	(6)
2013–2015	Toronto FC	11	(1)
2015	→ San Antonio Scorpions (loan)	5	(1)
2016	Amkar Perm	4	(0)
2017	Pahang FA	8	(3)

International career
2012–2014	Nigeria	2	(1)
- * Club domestic league appearances and goals

Chinedu "Bright" Dike (born 2 February 1987) is a retired footballer who played as a forward. Born in the United States, he played for the Nigeria national team.

== Club career ==
=== College and amateur ===
Born in Edmond, Oklahoma, Dike attended Edmond North High School, and played college soccer at the University of Notre Dame from 2005 to 2009, redshirting his junior season in 2007. As a senior, he started all 21 games for the Irish, led the team in goals (12) and total points (29), and was named to the all-Big East Championship team.

During his college years Dike also played one season with the Indiana Invaders in the USL Premier Development League.

=== Professional ===
Dike was drafted in the first round (12th overall) of the 2010 MLS SuperDraft by Columbus Crew. However, after training with the club all preseason, he did not make the squad and was released. On 7 April 2010, Dike signed a one-year contract with Portland Timbers. He made his professional debut on 22 April 2010 in a game against AC St. Louis.

Dike recorded his first professional hat trick by scoring three goals in a 22 June 2010 US Open Cup match vs. the Kitsap Pumas. During the 2010 USSF D2 Pro League season Dike appeared in 23 matches for Portland in which he scored 10 goals.

On 19 October 2010 Dike was named as one of the first four players to be signed by the Portland Timbers ahead of their expansion into Major League Soccer in 2011, along with Steve Cronin, Ryan Pore and Eddie Johnson. Dike was loaned to USL Pro club Los Angeles Blues on 8 May 2012 and recalled to Portland on 10 July 2012. After returning to the Portland, Dike scored 5 goals in the remaining 11 games of the season.

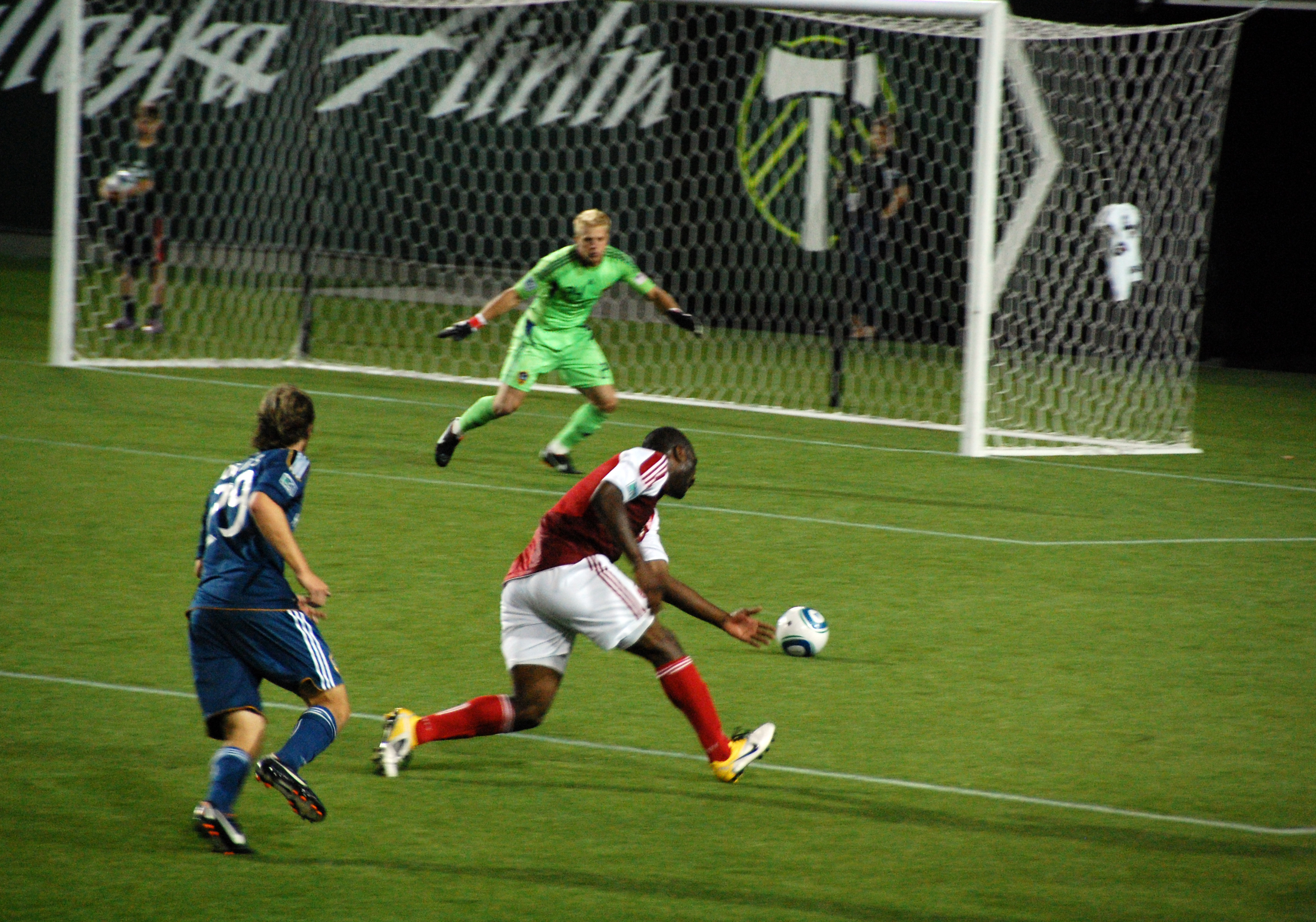
Dike playing for the Timbers

On 8 February 2013, it was announced that Dike suffered a torn left ACL in a preseason match against Seattle Sounders FC and was expected be out until at least August 2013.

Dike was traded to Toronto FC in September 2013 along with a 2015 first-round draft pick and allocation money in exchange for Maximiliano Urruti and an international roster spot. Dike scored his first goal for Toronto on 28 September 2013, the game-winner in a 4–1 victory over D.C. United. Dike scored the volley off of a cross by Mark Bloom. Following impressive form with the national team, Toronto FC arranged a training stint for Dike at Celtic of the Scottish Premiership following the 2013 MLS season. At this time, speculation also arose that both Hull City and Queen's Park Rangers were interested in signing the striker. On 9 December 2013, it was reported that Dike had returned to Toronto from Celtic without an offer for the player at that time. On 20 February 2014 Dike suffered the injury while training with Toronto FC, according to Goal.com. The injury is expected to keep him out for the year and will prevent him from participating in the 2014 FIFA World Cup in Brazil. Dike had previously suffered a similar injury while playing with the Portland Timbers.

On 27 April 2015 he was loaned out to North American Soccer League squad San Antonio Scorpions for an undeclared time being, to exercise first team playing time. Dike was waived by Toronto on 4 August 2015.

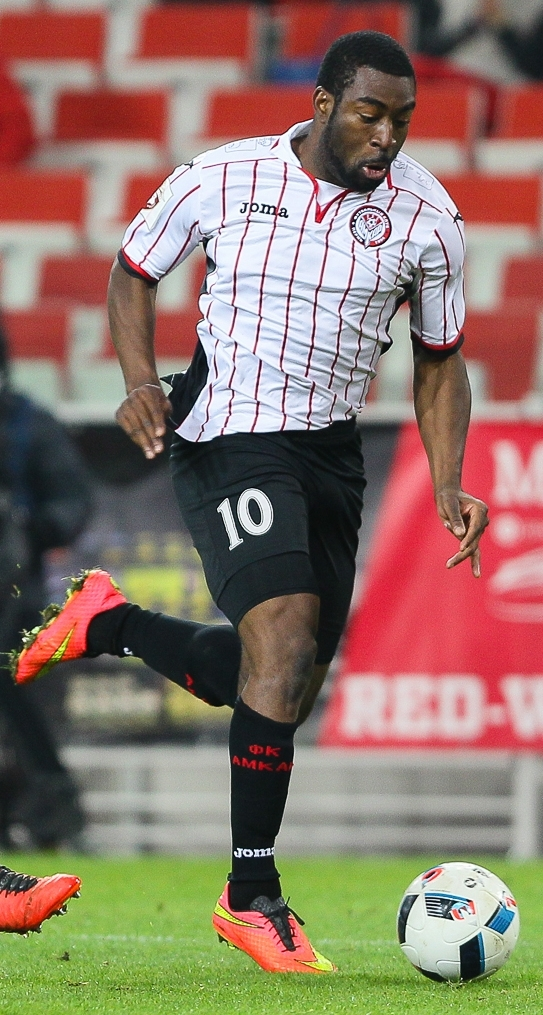
Dike with Amkar Perm

On 20 February 2016, Dike signed an 18-month contract with Russian Premier League side FC Amkar Perm. Dike was released by the club on 24 May 2016.

Dike signed for Pahang FA before the 2017 Malaysia League's transfer window closed. He scored on his debut against T-Team in the Malaysia Super League. Where he helped Pahang to Malaysia FA cup semi final by scoring third goal in first leg quarter final against JDT, which saw the former won on aggregate 4–3. He was released during mid season transfer window and before the FA cup final when the club decided to replaced him with Yamil Romero.

== International career ==
On 11 November 2012, Dike received a call up to the Nigerian national team for a friendly against Venezuela in Miami. On 14 November 2012 he made his international debut for the Super Eagles in a 3–1 victory over Venezuela in a friendly at Marlins Park in Miami, Florida. He started the match and played 68 minutes. Dike earned his second call up with the national team as part of the provisional 32-man roster in December 2012 as Nigeria prepared for friendlies against Catalonia and Cape Verde in preparation for the 2013 Africa Cup of Nations. On 2 January 2013 Dike scored his first goal for Nigeria in a 1–1 draw in the unofficial friendly against Catalonia, a side that featured Carles Puyol, Xavi, and Gerard Pique. Despite being called a "new sensation", Dike was left off of the roster for the match against Cape Verde and was not selected for Nigeria's final 23-man roster for the African Cup of Nations tournament.

In November 2013, Dike was called back into the Nigerian squad as a replacement for the injured Uche Nwofor of SC Heerenveen for the second leg of Nigeria's 2014 FIFA World Cup qualification playoff match against Ethiopia and a friendly against Italy. About bringing Dike back into the squad, Nigeria head coach Stephen Keshi said, "We are bringing (Dike) into the squad because we know what he is capable of doing and we believe he is fully fit to deliver". Dike dressed and was on the bench for the Ethiopia match but did not play. Two days later, Dike started in the friendly match against Italy and scored his first official goal for the Super Eagles in the 35th minute with an assist by Shola Ameobi.

Dike suffered a torn Achilles during practice in February 2014 that forced him out of the running for participating in the World Cup for Nigeria under Stephen Keshi. Stephen Keshi later confirmed that he would have been on the roster for Brazil had he not been injured, saying "He would have been here, yes. It's a shame. But that's football."

== Personal life ==
His sister Courtney is also a soccer player, who played for the Nigeria women's national under-20 football team the 2014 FIFA U-20 Women's World Cup in Canada. She scored the fastest goal in the History of the FIFA U-20 Women's World Cup, after 18 seconds against Korea on 10 June 2014. His brother Daryl is also a soccer player, having represented the UVA Cavaliers in college before being signed in the MLS Superdraft by Orlando City SC.

He is the cousin of Super Eagles striker Emmanuel Emenike.

== Career statistics ==
As of 18 November 2013; Nigeria's goal tally listed first

#	Date	Venue	Opponent	Score	Result	Competition	Reference
1	18 November 2013	Craven Cottage, London, England	Italy	1 – 1	2 – 2	Friendly	
