= Ryan Pore =

American soccer player (born 1983)

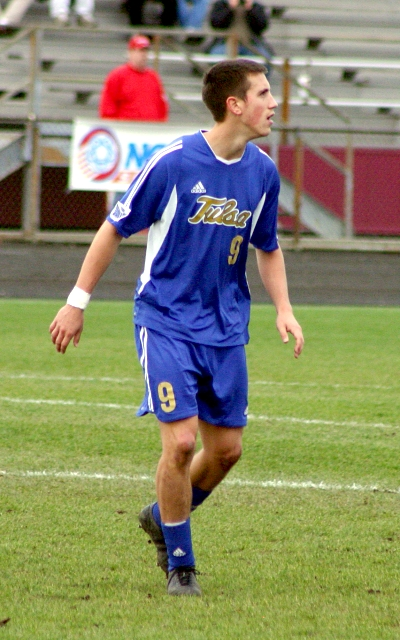
- Pore in 2004

Personal information
- Date of birth: September 23, 1983 (age 43)
- Place of birth: Mansfield, Ohio, United States
- Height: 5 ft 11 in (1.80 m)
- Positions: Midfielder; forward

College career
Years	Team	Apps	(Gls)
2002–2004	Tulsa Golden Hurricane	63	(51)

Senior career*
Years	Team	Apps	(Gls)
2005–2008	Kansas City Wizards	58	(3)
2009–2010	Portland Timbers	52	(25)
2011	Portland Timbers	8	(0)
2011	→ Montreal Impact (loan)	11	(7)
Total		129	(35)

Managerial career
- 2013–2019: Tulsa Golden Hurricane (assistant)
- 2020–: Kansas City Roos
- * Club domestic league appearances and goals

Ryan Pore (born September 23, 1983) is an American former professional soccer player and the current head men's soccer coach of Kansas City Roos men's soccer at the University of Missouri–Kansas City.

== Career ==
=== Youth and college ===
Pore attended Madison Comprehensive High School in Mansfield, Ohio and holds the Ohio High School Athletic Association record for most goals scored in a season (62) and school record in basketball for career scoring. He then went on to play college soccer at the University of Tulsa, where in 2004 he was a finalist for the Hermann Trophy and was awarded Soccer America Player of the Year.

=== Professional ===
Pore went on to forgo his senior season at Tulsa and signed a Generation Adidas contract. He was drafted in the second round (16th overall) of the 2005 MLS SuperDraft by Kansas City Wizards, and spent the next four years with the MLS side, playing in 58 league games and tallying three goals.

After the 2008 season, he was out of contract and signed with Portland Timbers of the USL First Division on March 12, 2009. During his first year with Portland, Pore appeared in 23 league matches scoring 10 goals. During the 2010 season Pore appeared in 29 league matches for Portland and led the USSF D2 Pro League in scoring with 15 goals and won both the golden boot and MVP.

On October 19, 2010, Pore was named as one of the first four players to be signed by the Portland Timbers ahead of their expansion into Major League Soccer in 2011, along with Steve Cronin, Bright Dike and Eddie Johnson.

On July 22, 2011, Pore joined NASL club Montreal Impact on loan until the end of the season.

Following the 2011 season, the Timbers announced that they had declined a second year option on Pore's contract and he would not be brought back for the 2012 season. Pore entered the 2011 MLS Re-Entry Draft but was not selected, making him a free agent.

Pore retired after the 2011 season and then moved to Tulsa, Oklahoma with his family and went back to school at the University of Tulsa. While at the University of Tulsa, Pore was the men's soccer team associate head coach.

On January 14, 2020, Pore was named as the new head coach of the Kansas City Roos men's soccer team.

== Honors ==
Portland Timbers

- USL First Division Commissioner's Cup: 2009

Individual

- USL First Division All-League First Team: 2009
- USSF D-2 Pro League Goal Scoring Champion: 2010
- USSF D-2 Pro League Most Valuable Player: 2010
- USSF D-2 Pro League Best XI: 2010
