= Eric Brunner (soccer) =

American soccer player

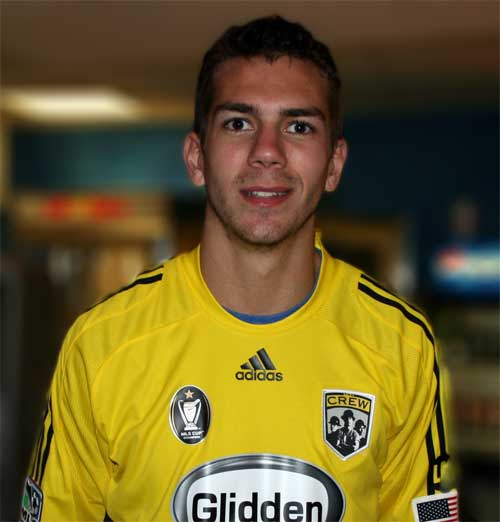

Personal information
- Date of birth: February 12, 1986 (age 40)
- Place of birth: Dublin, Ohio, United States
- Height: 6 ft 4 in (1.93 m)
- Position: Defender

College career
| Years | Team | Apps | (Gls) |
| 2004 | Maryland Terrapins | 4 | (0) |
| 2005–2007 | Ohio State Buckeyes | 68 | (10) |

Senior career*
| Years | Team | Apps | (Gls) |
| 2007 | Michigan Bucks | 11 | (2) |
| 2008 | New York Red Bulls | 0 | (0) |
| 2008 | Miami FC | 13 | (0) |
| 2009–2010 | Columbus Crew | 39 | (2) |
| 2011–2012 | Portland Timbers | 45 | (4) |
| 2013–2014 | Houston Dynamo | 19 | (0) |
| Total | | 127 | (8) |

International career^{‡}
| 2008 | United States U23 | 2 | (1) |
- * Club domestic league appearances and goals as of November 12, 2014 ‡ National team caps and goals as of October 27, 2012

Eric Brunner (born February 12, 1986) is an American former professional soccer player who played as a defender.

== Career ==
=== Professional ===
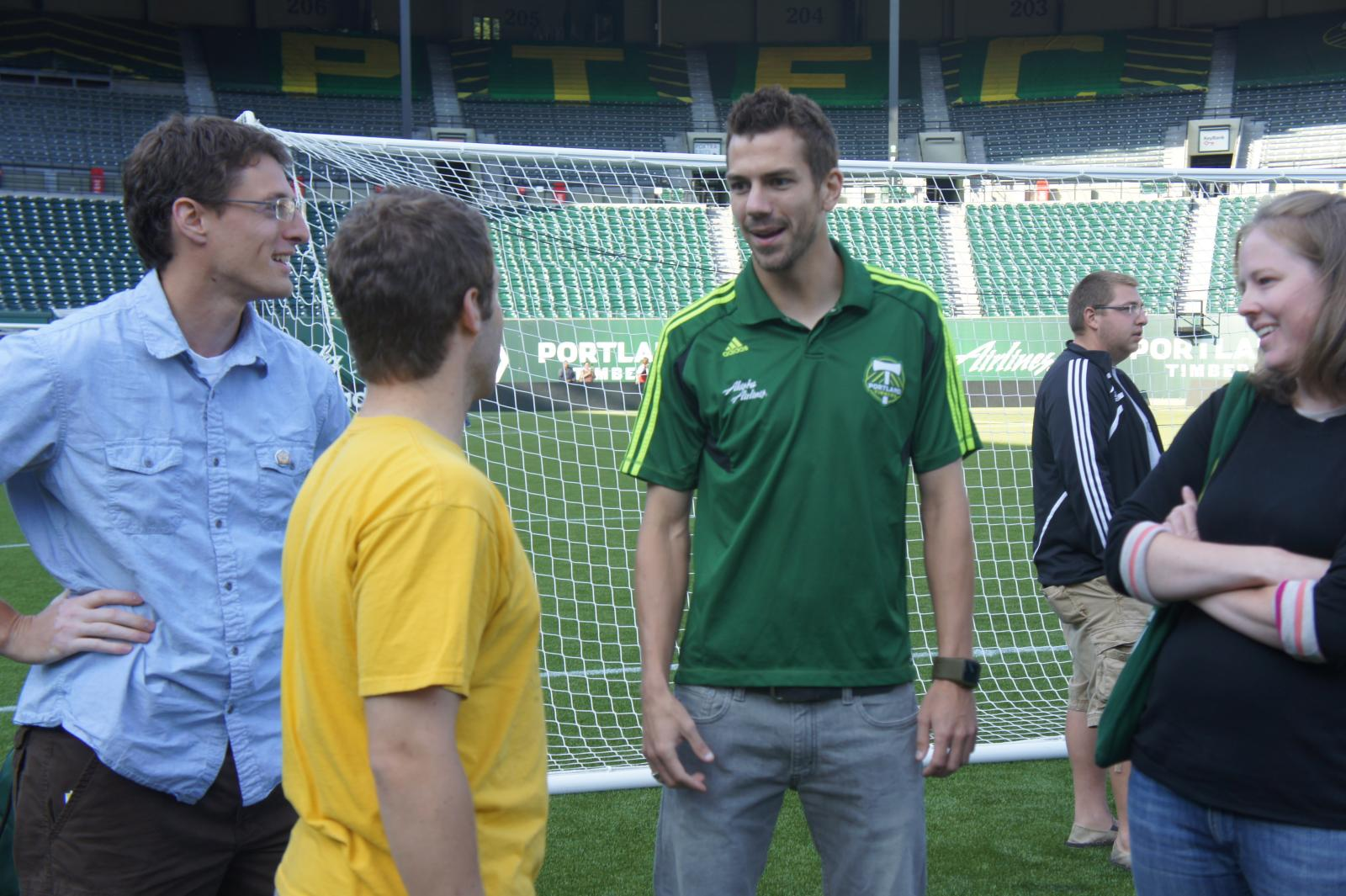
Brunner at a Portland Timbers fan event

Following his college career Brunner was selected 16th in the 2008 MLS SuperDraft by New York Red Bulls. He initially signed a senior contract, but when the Red Bulls signed Andrew Boyens, they tried to move him down to the developmental roster. However, Brunner refused to take the pay cut and left the team. He signed with Miami FC of the USL First Division of May 20, 2008. Brunner made his first appearance for Miami on June 14, 2008, when he came on as a substitute and played for five minutes.

He made his Columbus debut against Colorado Rapids on April 11, 2009, and scored his first career professional goal on June 20, 2009, against FC Dallas.

On November 24, 2010, he was selected by the Portland Timbers in the 2011 MLS Expansion Draft. He was a frequent starter for the Timbers until suffering a concussion on May 26, 2012, after which he sat out much of the remainder of the 2012 season.

On December 3, 2012, he was traded to the Houston Dynamo in exchange for allocation money.

He retired following the 2014 season.

=== International ===
Brunner was called up to play for the United States under-23 men's national soccer team at the 2008 Toulon Tournament.

== Personal life ==
Brunner is a gamer, and streams live gameplay under the pseudonym "Broomsweeper" on Twitch. As of 24 December 2014, he has over 8,400 followers and primarily plays Counter-Strike: Global Offensive on his channel.
