= Jorge Perlaza =

Colombian footballer (born 1985)

Personal information
- Full name: Jorge Isaacs Perlaza Aguiño
- Date of birth: 11 October 1985 (age 41)
- Place of birth: Guapi, Colombia
- Height: 1.78 m (5 ft 10 in)
- Position: Striker

Senior career*
Years	Team	Apps	(Gls)
2001	Atlético Huila	6	(0)
2002	Deportes Quindío	1	(0)
2002–2003	Deportivo Pasto	34	(2)
2004–2006	Deportes Quindío	36	(9)
2007–2011	Deportes Tolima	132	(28)
2011–2012	Portland Timbers	41	(6)
2012	Philadelphia Union	2	(0)
2012–2013	Millonarios	18	(2)

International career^{‡}
2006	Colombia	1	(0)
- * Club domestic league appearances and goals as of 16 October 2013 ‡ National team caps and goals as of 12 October 2010

Jorge Isaacs Perlaza Aguiño (born 11 October 1985) is a Colombian footballer.

== Club career ==
=== Colombia ===
Perlaza began his professional career in 2001 with Atlético Huila debuting with the club as a 16-year-old. In 2002, he moved to Deportes Quindío and played primarily with the reserve side. During the middle of the 2002 season Perlaza joined Deportivo Pasto and began to receive more playing time appearing in 34 matches and scoring his first two goals as a professional. In 2004, he rejoined Quindio and had a breakthrough season in 2006 scoring 8 goals in 26 matches. His play for Quindio led him to be called to the national team.

In 2007, he joined Deportes Tolima and continued his fine play. Perlaza was one of the top scorers in the 2010 Liga Postobon II scoring 10 goals as he helped Tolima qualify to the 2011 Copa Libertadores. While at Tolima Perlaza has participated in the Copa Libertadores in 2007 and the Copa Sudamericana in 2010 appearing in 14 matches and scoring 4 goals.

=== United States ===
During January 2011 it was reported that Perlaza would be trialing with MLS side Portland Timbers. Perlaza signed with Portland on 7 March 2011., and scored his first goals for the club – the first of which was the first ever home goal for the Timbers at the newly renovated Jeld-Wen Field – on 14 April 2011 in a 4–2 win over the Chicago Fire.

On 6 June 2012 Perlaza was traded to the Philadelphia Union in exchange for forward Danny Mwanga.

On 28 August 2012, upon mutual decision with Perlaza and management, Perlaza's contract was terminated by the Philadelphia Union after he appeared in just 2 games.

== International career ==
Due to his form while with Deportes Quindío Perlaza was called up to the Colombia national football team in 2006.

== Career statistics ==
=== Club ===
Club performance			League		Cup		League Cup		Continental		Total	
Season	Club	League	Apps	Goals	Apps	Goals	Apps	Goals	Apps	Goals	Apps	Goals
Colombia			League		Cup		League Cup		South America		Total	
2001	Atlético Huila	Categoría Primera A	6	0	0	0	0	0	0	0	6	0
2002	Deportes Quindío	Categoría Primera A	1	0	0	0	0	0	0	0	1	0
2002	Deportivo Pasto	Categoría Primera A	13	2	0	0	0	0	0	0	13	2
2003	Deportivo Pasto	Categoría Primera A	21	0	0	0	0	0	0	0	21	0
2004	Deportes Quindío	Categoría Primera A	2	0	0	0	0	0	0	0	2	0
2005	Deportes Quindío	Categoría Primera A	8	1	0	0	0	0	0	0	8	1
2006	Deportes Quindío	Categoría Primera A	26	8	0	0	0	0	0	0	26	8
2007	Deportes Tolima	Categoría Primera A	29	2	0	0	0	0	0	0	29	2
2008	Deportes Tolima	Categoría Primera A	27	3	0	0	0	0	0	0	27	3
2009	Deportes Tolima	Categoría Primera A	47	8	0	0	0	0	0	0	47	8
2010	Deportes Tolima	Categoría Primera A	29	15	0	0	0	0	6	1	35	16
USA			League		Open Cup		League Cup		North America		Total	
2011	Portland Timbers	Major League Soccer	31	6	1	0	0	0	0	0	32	6
2012	Portland Timbers	Major League Soccer	10	0	1	0	0	0	0	0	11	0
2012	Philadelphia Union	Major League Soccer	2	0	0	0	0	0	0	0	2	0
Total	Colombia		209	39	0	0	0	0	6	1	215	40
Total	USA		43	6	2	0	0	0	0	0	45	6
Career total			252	45	2	0	0	0	6	1	260	46

Updated 30 June 2012
