= 2014 Houston Dynamo season =

Houston Dynamo
2014 season
- Owner: Philip Anschutz
- Head coach: Dominic Kinnear
- Stadium: BBVA Compass Stadium
- MLS: Eastern Conference: 8th Overall: 14th
- MLS Cup playoffs: Did not qualify
- U.S. Open Cup: Fifth round
- Top goalscorer: League: Giles Barnes (11); All: Giles Barnes (12)
- Average home league attendance: 20,117
Home colors	Away colors

The 2014 Houston Dynamo season was the club's ninth season of existence, and their ninth consecutive season in Major League Soccer, the top flight of American soccer.

== Roster ==
No.	Position	Nation	Player
1	Goalkeeper	USA	Tally Hall
2	Defender	USA	Eric Brunner
3	Defender	USA	Anthony Arena
4	Defender	JAM	Jermaine Taylor
7	Forward	JAM	Omar Cummings
8	Defender	USA	Kofi Sarkodie
10	Midfielder	HON	Alexander Lopez
11	Midfielder	USA	Brad Davis
12	Forward	USA	Will Bruin
13	Midfielder	USA	Ricardo Clark
14	Forward	JAM	Jason Johnson
15	Forward	USA	Mark Sherrod
16	Defender	USA	A.J. Cochran
17	Midfielder	USA	Servando Carrasco
18	Defender	USA	David Horst
19	Midfielder	HON	Luis Garrido
20	Midfielder	SCO	Andrew Driver
21	Defender	USA	Damarcus Beasley
22	Midfielder	USA	Brian Ownby
23	Forward	JAM	Giles Barnes
24	Goalkeeper	USA	Tyler Deric
26	Defender	USA	Corey Ashe
27	Midfielder	HON	Boniek García
28	Midfielder	USA	Tony Cascio
30	Goalkeeper	USA	Michael Lisch

== Transfers ==
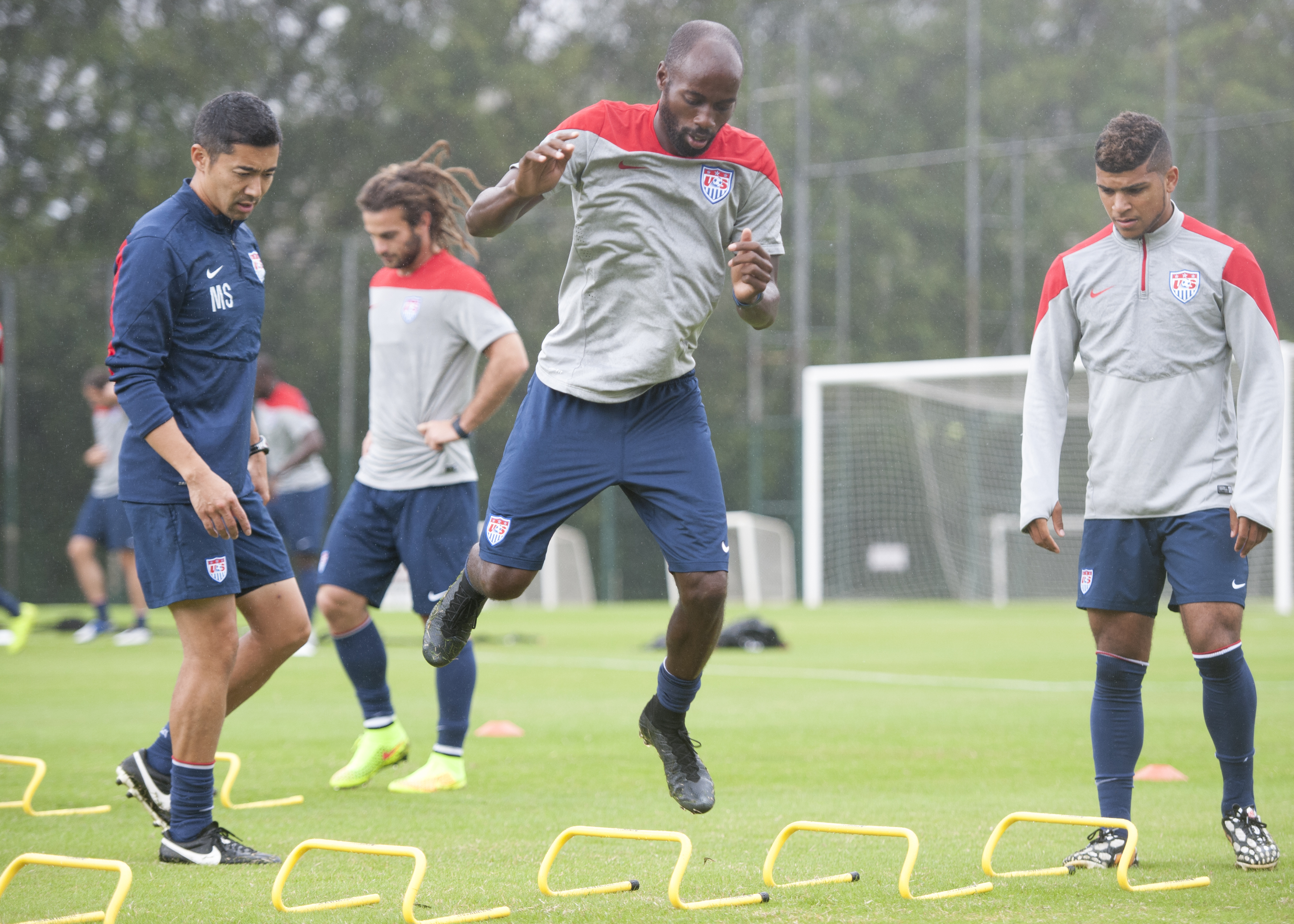
USA international DaMarcus Beasley joined the club after the 2014 World Cup as a DP

=== In ===
Position	Player	Previous club	Date
Defender	(United States) David Horst	(United States) Portland Timbers	December 17, 2013
Defender	(United States) DaMarcus Beasley	(Mexico) Puebla	July 23, 2014
Midfielder	(Honduras) Luis Garirdo	(Honduras) Olimpia	July 25, 2014

=== Out ===
Position	Player	Transferred to	Date
Defender	(United States) Bobby Boswell	(United States) D.C. United	December 12, 2013
Defender	(United States) Warren Creavalle	(Canada) Toronto FC	July 23, 2014

=== Loan in ===
Position	Player	Loaned From	Date
Midfielder	(United States) Tony Cascio	(United States) Colorado Rapids	January 21, 2014

=== Loan out ===
Position	Player	Loaned To	Date
Forward	(Jamaica) Jason Johnson	(United States) Pittsburgh Riverhounds	March 24, 2014
Defender	(United States) Anthony Arena	(United States) Pittsburgh Riverhounds	March 24, 2014
Forward	(United States) Bryan Salazar	(United States) Pittsburgh Riverhounds	March 24, 2014
Goalkeeper	(United States) Michael Lisch	(United States) Pittsburgh Riverhounds	April 3, 2014
Forward	(United States) Brian Ownby	(United States) Pittsburgh Riverhounds	April 3, 2014

== Competitions ==
=== Preseason ===
January 29, 2014 Scrimmage	Houston Dynamo	4 - 0	Dynamo Academy	Houston, Texas
3:00 p.m. CST	Bruin 29'; Carrasco (yellow card) 33'; Arena (yellow card) 38'; Sherrod 63'; Seoane 67'; Johnson 73'	Report		Stadium: Houston Sports Park

February 2, 2014 Scrimmage	Houston Dynamo	2 - 3	Colorado Rapids	Houston, Texas
11:00 a.m. CST	Cascio 15'; Barnes 38'	Report	Serna 12'; Brown 47'; Torres 86'	Stadium: Houston Sports Park

February 5, 2014 Desert Friendlies	Houston Dynamo	0 - 2	Portland Timbers	Tucson, Arizona
2:00 p.m. MT		Report	Johnson 80'; Urruti 83'	Stadium: Kino Sports Complex

February 8, 2014 Desert Friendlies	Houston Dynamo	3 - 1	San Jose Earthquakes	Tucson, Arizona
3:00 p.m. MT	Cummings 66'; Seoane 74', (yellow card) 82'; Cascio 84'	Report	Wondolowski 22'	Stadium: Kino Sports Complex

February 10, 2014 Desert Friendlies	FC Tucson	0 - 2	Houston Dynamo	Tucson, Arizona
10:00 a.m. MT	Salticcia (red card) 75'	Report	Ownby 45'; Cummings 83'	Stadium: Kino Sports Complex

February 12, 2014 Scrimmage	Houston Baptist Huskies	0 - 6	Houston Dynamo	Houston, Texas
7:00 p.m. CST	Kelley (yellow card) 17'	Report	Barnes 12', (yellow card) 21'; Davis 15', 27'; Cascio 34'; Johnson (yellow card) 55'; Sherrod 72'; Cummings 74'	Stadium: Sorrels Field

February 15, 2014 Scrimmage	Houston Dynamo	2 - 0	SMU Mustangs	Houston, Texas
11:00 a.m. CST	Seoane 15'; Brunner (yellow card) 56'; Davis 58'	Report		Stadium: Houston Sports Park

February 19, 2014 Scrimmage	Houston Dynamo	4 - 1	Pittsburgh Riverhounds	Houston, Texas
11:00 a.m. CST	Cascio 18'; Barnes 28', 59'; Cummings 79'	Report	Kerr 25'	Stadium: Houston Sports Park

February 22, 2014 Carolina Challenge Cup	Houston Dynamo	0 - 2	D.C. United	Charleston, South Carolina
5:00 p.m. EST	Bruin (yellow card) 66'	Report	Horst 21' (o.g.); Kitchen (yellow card) 32'; Arnaud (yellow card) 55'; Christian (yellow card) 71'; Seaton 88', (yellow card) 90'	Stadium: Blackbaud Stadium; Attendance: 5,175

February 26, 2014 Carolina Challenge Cup	Seattle Sounders FC	1 - 1	Houston Dynamo	Charleston, South Carolina
5:00 p.m. EST	Martins 44'; González (yellow card) 45+1'	Report	Davis 14'; Arena (yellow card) 72'	Stadium: Blackbaud Stadium

March 1, 2014 Carolina Challenge Cup	Charleston Battery	0 - 2	Houston Dynamo	Charleston, South Carolina
5:15 p.m. EST		Report	Cascio 53'; Barnes 63'	Stadium: Blackbaud Stadium

=== MLS ===
March 8, 2014 1	Houston Dynamo	4 - 0	New England Revolution	Houston, Texas
7:30 CT	Will Bruin 2', 13', (yellow card) 64'; Boniek Garcia 23'; Omar Cummings 90+2'		Darrius Barnes (yellow card) 64'; AJ Soares (yellow card) 77'	Stadium: BBVA Compass Stadium; Attendance: 22,320

March 15, 2014 2	Houston Dynamo	1 - 0	Montreal Impact	Houston, Texas
7:30 CT	Kofi Sarkodie (yellow card) 35'; Will Bruin 40'; Jermaine Taylor (yellow card) 52'		Felipe Martins (yellow card) 59'; Hassoun Camara (yellow card) 77'; Hernan Bernardello (yellow card) 78'	Stadium: BBVA Compass Stadium; Attendance: 18,245

March 29, 2014 3	Vancouver Whitecaps FC	2 - 1	Houston Dynamo	Vancouver, British Columbia
6:00 CT	Jordan Harvey 14'; Kenny Miller 23' (pen.)		Ricardo Clark 75'	Stadium: BC Place; Attendance: 21,000

April 5, 2014 4 Texas Derby	Houston Dynamo	1 - 4	FC Dallas	Houston, Texas
7:00 CT	Jermaine Taylor (yellow card) 21'; Ricardo Clark 41'; David Horst (red card) 60'		Michel 31' (pen.); Hendry Thomas (yellow card) 37'; Je-Vaughn Watson 61', 70'; Giles Barnes 68' (o.g.)	Stadium: BBVA Compass Stadium; Attendance: 22,202

April 12, 2014 5	New England Revolution	2 - 0	Houston Dynamo	Foxborough, Massachusetts
4:00 CT	Kevin Alston 68', (yellow card) 88'; Scott Caldwell (yellow card) 86'; Jerry Bengtson 90+1'		Ricardo Clark (yellow card) 38'	Stadium: Gillette Stadium; Attendance: 14,259

April 19, 2014 6	Philadelphia Union	0 - 0	Houston Dynamo	Chester, Pennsylvania
3:00 CT	Sheanon Williams (yellow card) 61'		Kofi Sarkodie (red card) 82'; Ricardo Clark (yellow card) 42'; Will Bruin (yellow card) 90+4'	Stadium: PPL Park; Attendance: 17,301

April 23, 2014 7	New York Red Bulls	4 - 0	Houston Dynamo	Harrison, New Jersey
6:30 CT	Bradley Wright-Phillips 12', 24', 86' (pen.); Thierry Henry 65'			Stadium: Red Bull Arena; Attendance: 13,278

April 27, 2014 8	Houston Dynamo	1 - 1	Portland Timbers	Houston, Texas
2:00 CT	Will Bruin 16'; Jermaine Taylor (yellow card) 40'		Gaston Fernandez 33'	Stadium: BBVA Compass Stadium; Attendance: 20,558

May 3, 2014 9	Chivas USA	1 - 4	Houston Dynamo	Carson, California
9:30 CT	Erick Torres 7' (pen.); Tim Melia (red card) 67'		Brad Davis 12'; Giles Barnes 32', 69' (pen.); Will Bruin 45+2'	Stadium: StubHub Center; Attendance: 6,082

May 7, 2014 10	Houston Dynamo	1 - 0	Columbus Crew	Houston, Texas
7:00 CT	Will Bruin 50'; Warren Creavalle (yellow card) 87'		Bernardo Anor (yellow card) 60'; Federico Higuain (yellow card) 61'; Daniel Paladini (yellow card) 80'	Stadium: BBVA Compass Stadium; Attendance: 15,030

May 11, 2014 11	Houston Dynamo	2 - 5	Real Salt Lake	Houston, Texas
6:00 CT	Mark Sherrod 22', 56', (yellow card) 90+2'; Boniek Garcia (yellow card) 45+4'; Servando Carrasco (red card) 27'		Javier Morales 1', 17', 89' (pen.); Alvaro Saborio 32', (yellow card) 26'; Luke Mulholland 78'	Stadium: BBVA Compass Stadium; Attendance: 16,514

March 28, 2014 12	Houston Dynamo	1 - 0	Los Angeles Galaxy	Houston, Texas
7:30 CT	Jermaine Taylor (yellow card) 17'; Giles Barnes 61'		AJ DeLaGarza (yellow card) 19'; Kofi Opare (yellow card) 76'	Stadium: BBVA Compass Stadium; Attendance: 22,233

May 21, 2014 13	D.C. United	2 - 0	Houston Dynamo	Washington DC
6:00 CT	Chris Rolfe 28'; Davy Arnaud (yellow card) 36'; Lewis Neal (yellow card) 56'; Fabian Espindola 63', (yellow card) 72'		Giles Barnes (yellow card) 65'; Brian Ownby (red card) 90+2'	Stadium: RFK Stadium; Attendance: 8,224

May 25, 2014 14	San Jose Earthquakes	3 - 0	Houston Dynamo	San Jose, California
9:30 CT	Khari Stephenson 38', 58' (pen.); Steven Lenhart (yellow card) 60'; Atiba Harris 70'			Stadium: Buck Shaw Stadium; Attendance: 10,525

June 1, 2014 15	Colorado Rapids	3 - 0	Houston Dynamo	Commerce City, Colorado
7:00 CT	Deshorn Brown 5', 35'; Kamani Hill 51'		Warren Creavalle (yellow card) 40'	Stadium: Dick's Sporting Goods Park; Attendance: 17,470

June 6, 2014 16	Houston Dynamo	0 - 2	Sporting Kansas City	Houston, Texas
7:30 CT	Alexander Lopez (yellow card) 21'; Andrew Driver (yellow card) 29'; Eric Brunner (yellow card) 45+2'; Jermaine Taylor (yellow card) 79'		Toni (red card) 21'; Soony Saad 45', (yellow card) 87'; Dom Dwyer 70' (pen.); Eric Kronberg (yellow card) 90+4'	Stadium: BBVA Compass Stadium; Attendance: 18,396

June 29, 2014 17	Montreal Impact	3 - 0	Houston Dynamo	Montreal, Quebec
6:30 CT	Jack McInerney 41', 75'; Maxim Tissot (yellow card) 22'; Marco Di Vaio 79'		AJ Cochran (yellow card) 16'; Will Bruin (yellow card) 52'	Stadium: Saputo Stadium; Attendance: 16,759

July 4, 2014 18	Houston Dynamo	2 - 2	New York Red Bulls	Houston, Texas
7:30 CT	Giles Barnes 1'; AJ Cochran (yellow card) 50'; Brad Davis 82' (pen.)		Bradley Wright-Phillips 13', 72'; Jonny Steele (yellow card) 90+6'	Stadium: BBVA Compass Stadium; Attendance: 22,312

July 12, 2014 19	Toronto FC	4 - 2	Houston Dynamo	Toronto, Ontario
6:00 CT	Jonathan Osorio 39'; Dominic Oduro 45+1'; Jermain Defoe 63', 89', (yellow card) 37'		Brad Davis 13', 34'; Kofi Sarkodie (yellow card) 35'; Jermaine Taylor (yellow card) 37'; David Horst (yellow card) 40'; Ricardo Clark (yellow card) 56'; Warren Creavalle (yellow card) 59'	Stadium: BMO Field; Attendance: 22,591

July 19, 2014 20	Houston Dynamo	2 - 2	Toronto FC	Houston, Texas
8:00 CT	Will Bruin 11'} Giles Barnes 26'; Corey Ashe (yellow card) 79'		Gilberto 18'; Dominic Oduro 45+2', (yellow card) 81'; Doneil Henry (yellow card) 58'; Michael Bradley (yellow card) 79'; Jermain Defoe (yellow card) 88'	Stadium: BBVA Compass Stadium; Attendance: 20,069

August 3, 2014 21	Houston Dynamo	1 - 0	D.C. United	Houston, Texas
7:00 CT	Will Bruin 90'		Taylor Kemp (yellow card) 5'; Perry Kitchen (yellow card) 72'	Stadium: BBVA Compass Stadium; Attendance: 20,061

August 10, 2014 22	Seattle Sounders FC	2 - 0	Houston Dynamo	Seattle, Washington
9:30 CT	Lamar Neagle (yellow card) 28'; Obafemi Martins (red card) 86'; Marco Pappa 69'; Gonzalo Pineda 75' (pen.), (yellow card) 55'		Luis Garrido (yellow card) 60'; Kofi Sarkodie (yellow card) 90+4'	Stadium: CenturyLink Field; Attendance: 50,276

August 15, 2014 23	Houston Dynamo	2 - 0	Philadelphia Union	Houston, Texas
8:00 CT	David Horst (yellow card) 28'; Will Bruin 51'; DaMarcus Beasley (yellow card) 58'; Raymon Gaddis 90' (o.g.)		Danny Cruz (yellow card) 64'	Stadium: BBVA Compass Stadium; Attendance: 20,283

August 23, 2014 24	Columbus Crew	3 - 0	Houston Dynamo	Columbus, Ohio
6:30 CT	Justin Meram 35'; Adam Bedell 59'; Aaron Schoenfeld 64'		Corey Ashe (yellow card) 61'; Brian Ownby (yellow card) 79'	Stadium: Columbus Crew Stadium; Attendance: 17,551

August 29, 2014 25	Sporting Kansas City	1 - 3	Houston Dynamo	Kansas City, Kansas
7:00 CT	Dom Dwyer 54', (yellow card) 40'; Benny Feilhaber (yellow card) 44'		Will Bruin 35'; Kofi Sarkodie (yellow card) 44'; David Horst 62'; Ricardo Clark 67', (yellow card) 50'; Boniek Garcia (yellow card) 90+6'	Stadium: Children's Mercy Park; Attendance: 20,332

September 6, 2014 26	Houston Dynamo	3 - 2	Montreal Impact	Houston, Texas
7:30 CT	Giles Barnes 30', 62'; Ricardo Clark 65'		Dilly Duka 40'; Ignaco Piatti 55'; Felipe Martins (yellow card) 71'	Stadium: BBVA Compass Stadium; Attendance: 18,501

September 13, 2014 27	Houston Dynamo	2 - 2	Columbus Crew	Houston, Texas
7:30 CT	Aaron Schoenfeld 12' (o.g.); Giles Barnes 38', (yellow card) 63'; Boniek Garcia (yellow card) 45+2'; Kofi Sarkodie (yellow card) 86'		Aaron Schoenfled (yellow card) 34'; Will Trapp 48'; Ethan Finlay 54'; Bernardo Anor (yellow card) 68'; Waylon Francis (yellow card) 90'	Stadium: BBVA Compass Stadium; Attendance: 20,807

September 20, 2014 28	Houston Dynamo	0 - 0	Philadelphia Union	Philadelphia, Pennsylvania
7:00 ET	Sarkodie (yellow card) 75'			Stadium: PPL Park; Attendance: 18,462

September 28, 2014 29	Houston Dynamo	2 - 0	Chicago Fire	Houston, Texas
2:00 CT	Ricardo Clark (yellow card) 10'; Omar Cummings 15'; David Horst (yellow card) 21'; Boniek Garcia 67'		Gonzalo Segares (yellow card) 47'; Jeff Larentowicz (yellow card) 65'	Stadium: BBVA Compass Stadium; Attendance: 20,262

October 4, 2014 30	New York Red Bulls	1 - 0	Houston Dynamo	Harrison, New Jersey
5:00 CT	Thierry Henry 47'; Pegguy Luyindula (yellow card) 73'; Tim Cahill (red card) 88'		Boniek Garcia (yellow card) 54'; Giles Barnes (yellow card) 86'	Stadium: Red Bull Arena; Attendance: 21,569

October 8, 2014 31	Toronto FC	0 - 1	Houston Dynamo	Toronto, Ontario
6:30 CT	Daniel Lovitz (yellow card) 90+5'		Giles Barnes (yellow card) 35'; A.J. Cochran (red card) 56'	Stadium: BMO Field; Attendance: 18,269

October 12, 2014 32	Houston Dynamo	1 - 3	D.C. United	Houston, Texas
2:00 CT	Giles Barnes 83' (pen.)		Taylor Kemp 41'; Fabian Espindola 64'; Bill Hamid (yellow card) 70'; Eddie Johnson 87'	Stadium: BBVA Compass Stadium; Attendance: 21,869

October 16, 2014 33	Houston Dynamo	1 - 2	New England Revolution	Houston, Texas
7:00 CT	Giles Barnes 37', (yellow card) 73'; Jermaine Taylor (yellow card) 47'; Luis Garrido 52'		Lee Nguyen 65', 87'	Stadium: BBVA Compass Stadium; Attendance: 22,332

October 24, 2014 34	Chicago Fire	2 - 1	Houston Dynamo	Bridgeview, Illinois
7:00 CT	Alex (yellow card) 33'; Jeff Larentowicz 66' (pen.); Florent Sinama Pongolle 90+1'		Omar Cummings 18'; Tyler Deric (yellow card) 82'; Brad Davis (yellow card) 82'; AJ Cochran (yellow card) 85'	Stadium: Toyota Park; Attendance: 18,776

=== U.S. Open Cup ===
June 11 Fourth Round	Houston Dynamo (1)	1–0	Laredo Heat (4)	Houston, Texas
9:00 CT	López 38'; Deric (red card) 52'	Report	Braem (yellow card) 32' (yellow-red card) 40'; F. Garcia (yellow card) 70'	Stadium: BBVA Compass Stadium; Attendance: 4,929

June 24 Fifth Round Texas Derby	Houston Dynamo (1)	2–3 (a.e.t.)	FC Dallas (1)	Houston, Texas
8:00 CT	Barnes 43' (pen.); Cummings 62'; Taylor (yellow card) 102'	Report	Castillo 35'; Escobar 59'; Akindele 99'	Stadium: BBVA Compass Stadium; Attendance: 2,083

== Statistical Leaders ==
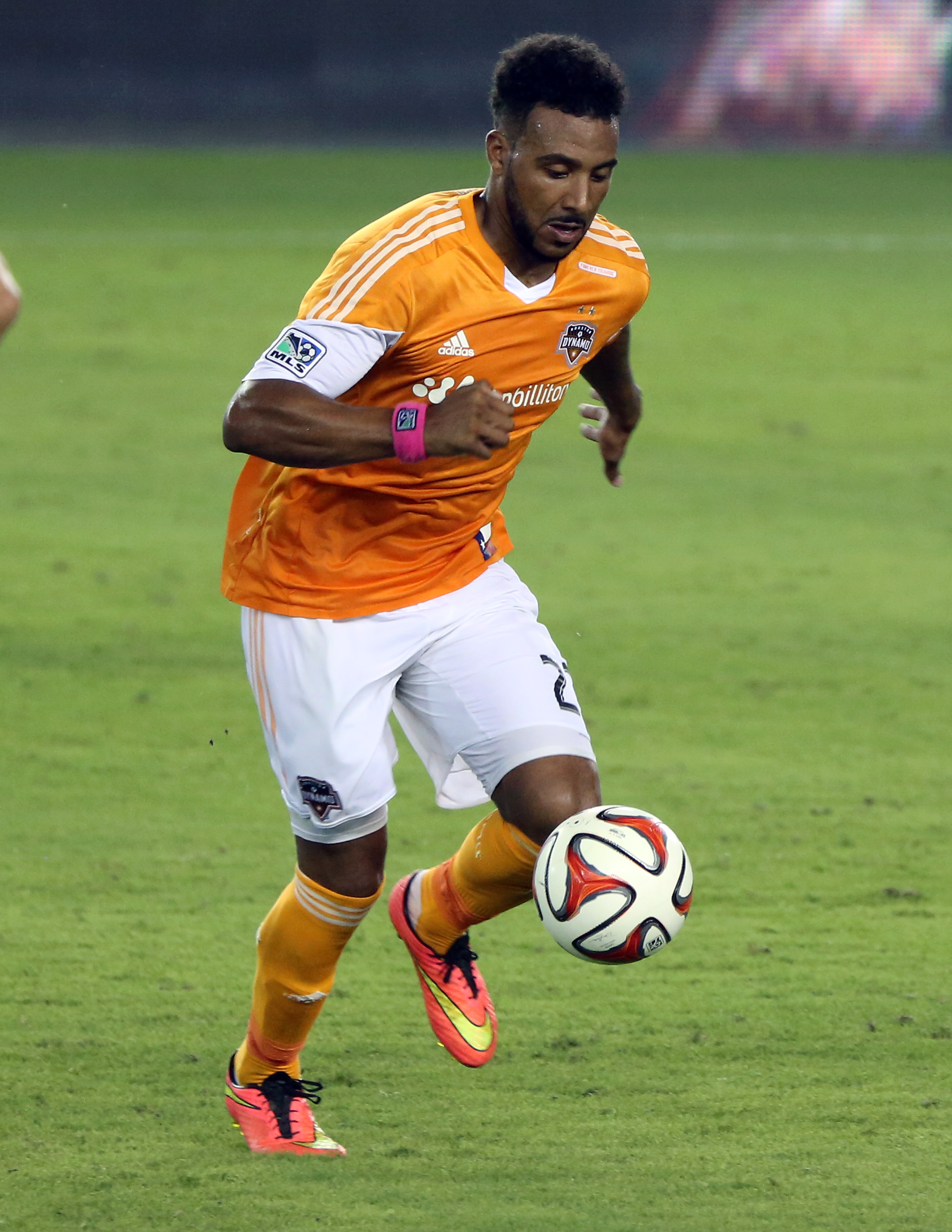
Giles Barnes led the Dynamo in both appearances and goals in 2014

Goals
Rank	Name	#
1	(Jamaica) Giles Barnes	11
2	(United States) Will Bruin	10
3	(United States) Ricardo Clark	4
3	(United States) Brad Davis	4
5	(Jamaica) Omar Cummings	3

Assists
Rank	Name	#
1	(United States) Brad Davis	11
2	(Jamaica) Giles Barnes	8
3	(United States) Ricardo Clark	4
3	(United States) Kofi Sarkodie	4
5	(United States) Corey Ashe	3
5	(Jamaica) Omar Cummings	3

Appearances (starts)
Rank	Name	#
1	(Jamaica) Giles Barnes	34(34)
1	(United States) Andrew Driver	34(22)
3	(United States) Kofi Sarkodie	32(32)
4	(United States) David Horst	31(31)
5	(United States) Will Bruin	27(24)
5	(Honduras) Boniek García	28(26)

Goalkeeping
Name	Apps.	Saves	GA	ShO
(United States) Tally Hall	24	67	44	7
(United States) Tyler Deric	10	36	14	3
(United States) Michael Lisch	0	0	0	0

== Uniforms ==
Home	Home Alt.	Away

== See also ==
- Houston Dynamo
- 2014 in American soccer
- 2014 Major League Soccer season
