= 2013 Houston Dynamo season =

Houston Dynamo
2013 season
- President: Chris Canneti
- Coach: Dominic Kinnear
- Major League Soccer: Conference: 4th Overall: 9th
- MLS Cup playoffs: Conference Finals
- U.S. Open Cup: Fourth round
- 2012–13 CONCACAF Champions League: Quarterfinals
- 2013–14 CONCACAF Champions League: Group stage
- Top goalscorer: League: Will Bruin (8); All: Will Bruin (10)
Home colors	Away colors	Third colors

The 2013 season is the Houston Dynamo's 8th competitive season in Major League Soccer, 8th year of existence as a football club, and their second consecutive season playing at BBVA Compass Stadium. They also competed in the CONCACAF Champions League, participating in the knockout phase of the 2012–13 campaign being eliminated by Santos Laguna in the quarterfinal 3–1 on Aggregate. They will be opening the 2013–14 group stage in late July or early August 2013.

During the 2013 season Houston suffered their first ever loss at BBVA Compass Stadium against Sporting Kansas City on May 12, 2013.

The Dynamo are entering the season as the two-time defending MLS Eastern Conference post-season champions and runners-up to the MLS Cup.

== Squads ==
=== First-team squad ===
Squad No.	Name	Nationality	Position(s)	Since	Date of birth (age)	Signed from	Games played	Goals scored
Goalkeepers
1	Tally Hall	(United States)	GK	2009	May 12, 1985 (age 41)	(Denmark) Esbjerg fB	79	0
24	Tyler Deric	(United States)	GK	2009	August 30, 1988 (age 37)	(United States) Houston Dynamo Academy	3	0
28	Erich Marscheider	(United States)	GK	2012	January 5, 1993 (age 33)	(United States) Colorado Rush Soccer Club	0	0
Defenders
2	Eric Brunner	(United States)	CB	2013	February 2, 1986 (age 40)	(United States) Portland Timbers	2	0
4	Jermaine Taylor	(Jamaica)	CB / RB/LB	2011	January 14, 1985 (age 41)	(Jamaica) St. George's SC	46	1
5	Warren Creavalle	(United States)	RB	2012	August 14, 1990 (age 36)	(United States) UCF Knights	16	2
6	Mike Chabala	(United States)	LB	2013	May 24, 1984 (age 42)	(United States) D.C. United	47	1
8	Kofi Sarkodie	(United States)	RB	2011	March 22, 1991 (age 35)	(United States) Akron Zips	24	0
21	Anthony Arena	(United States)	CB / LB	2013	August 3, 1990 (age 36)	(United States) Wake Forest Demon Deacons	0	0
26	Corey Ashe	(United States)	LB / LM	2007	March 14, 1986 (age 40)	(United States) North Carolina Tar Heels	167	1
32	Bobby Boswell	(United States)	CB	2008	March 15, 1983 (age 43)	(United States) D.C. United	152	9
Midfielders
11	Brad Davis (C)	(United States)	LM / CM	2006	November 8, 1981 (age 44)	(United States) San Jose Earthquakes	196	31
13	Ricardo Clark	(United States)	CM / DM	2012	February 10, 1983 (age 43)	(Germany) Eintracht Frankfurt	115	9
16	Adam Moffat	(Scotland)	CM / DM	2011	May 15, 1986 (age 40)	(United States) Portland Timbers	43	5
17	Luiz Camargo	(Brazil)	AM / CM	2011	May 4, 1987 (age 39)	(Brazil) Paraná Clube	36	1
19	Alex Dixon	(United States)	RM / CM	2011	February 7, 1990 (age 36)	(United States) Houston Dynamo Academy	11	1
20	Andrew Driver	(England)	LW / AM	2013	November 20, 1987 (age 38)	(Scotland) Heart of Midlothian	6	1
22	Brian Ownby	(United States)	AM / LW / RW	2012	July 16, 1990 (age 36)	(United States) Virginia Cavaliers	7	0
27	Oscar Boniek García	(Honduras)	LW / AM / RW	2012	September 4, 1984 (age 41)	(Honduras) C.D. Olimpia	20	4
Forwards
3	Calen Carr	(United States)	LW / ST	2011	October 4, 1982 (age 43)	(United States) Chicago Fire	35	5
7	Omar Cummings	(Jamaica)	LW / ST	2013	July 13, 1982 (age 44)	(United States) Colorado Rapids	2	0
9	Bryan Salazar	(United States)	ST	2013	October 17, 1994 (age 31)	(United States) Houston Dynamo Academy	0	0
12	Will Bruin	(United States)	CF	2011	October 24, 1989 (age 36)	(United States) Indiana Hoosiers	63	19
14	Jason Johnson	(Jamaica)	ST	2013	October 9, 1990 (age 35)	(United States) VCU Rams	0	0
15	Cam Weaver	(United States)	ST	2009	June 10, 1983 (age 43)	(United States) San Jose Earthquakes	64	10
23	Giles Barnes	(England)	LW / AM / ST	2012	August 5, 1988 (age 38)	(England) Doncaster Rovers	11	2
25	Brian Ching (VC)	(United States)	ST	2006	May 24, 1978 (age 48)	(United States) San Jose Earthquakes	160	56

Updated on April 21, 2013

Source (Stats are for Major League Soccer Regular Season Only):

== Statistics ==
=== Appearances and goals ===
No.	Pos	Nat	Player	Total		MLS		MLS Cup Playoffs		Champions League		U.S. Open Cup	
No.	Pos	Nat	Player	Apps	Goals	Apps	Goals	Apps	Goals	Apps	Goals	Apps	Goals
1	GK	(United States) USA	Tally Hall	13	0	11+0	0	0+0	0	2+0	0	0+0	0
2	DF	(United States) USA	Eric Brunner	4	0	2+2	0	0+0	0	0+0	0	0+0	0
3	FW	(United States) USA	Calen Carr	0	0	0+0	0	0+0	0	0+0	0	0+0	0
4	DF	(Jamaica) JAM	Jermaine Taylor	11	0	9+0	0	0+0	0	2+0	0	0+0	0
5	DF	(United States) USA	Warren Creavalle	8	2	1+5	2	0+0	0	2+0	0	0+0	0
6	DF	(United States) USA	Mike Chabala	0	0	0+0	0	0+0	0	0+0	0	0+0	0
7	FW	(Jamaica) JAM	Omar Cummings	2	0	0+2	0	0+0	0	0+0	0	0+0	0
8	DF	(United States) USA	Kofi Sarkodie	13	0	11+0	0	0+0	0	2+0	0	0+0	0
9	FW	(United States) USA	Bryan Salazar	0	0	0+0	0	0+0	0	0+0	0	0+0	0
11	MF	(United States) USA	Brad Davis	11	3	9+0	2	0+0	0	1+1	1	0+0	0
12	FW	(United States) USA	Will Bruin	12	4	10+0	4	0+0	0	2+0	0	0+0	0
13	MF	(United States) USA	Ricardo Clark	11	1	9+0	1	0+0	0	2+0	0	0+0	0
14	FW	(Jamaica) JAM	Jason Johnson	3	0	0+2	0	0+0	0	0+1	0	0+0	0
15	FW	(United States) USA	Cam Weaver	5	0	1+4	0	0+0	0	0+0	0	0+0	0
16	MF	(Scotland) SCO	Adam Moffat	12	0	10+0	0	0+0	0	2+0	0	0+0	0
17	MF	(Brazil) BRA	Luiz Camargo	5	0	0+5	0	0+0	0	0+0	0	0+0	0
19	MF	(United States) USA	Alex Dixon	0	0	0+0	0	0+0	0	0+0	0	0+0	0
20	MF	(England) ENG	Andrew Driver (On loan from Heart of Midlothian)	12	3	8+2	3	0+0	0	0+2	0	0+0	0
21	MF	(United States) USA	Anthony Arena	0	0	0+0	0	0+0	0	0+0	0	0+0	0
22	MF	(United States) USA	Brian Ownby (On loan to Richmond Kickers)	0	0	0+0	0	0+0	0	0+0	0	0+0	0
23	FW	(England) ENG	Giles Barnes	12	4	10+0	4	0+0	0	2+0	0	0+0	0
24	GK	(United States) USA	Tyler Deric	0	0	0+0	0	0+0	0	0+0	0	0+0	0
25	FW	(United States) USA	Brian Ching	11	0	0+9	0	0+0	0	0+2	0	0+0	0
26	DF	(United States) USA	Corey Ashe	12	0	11+0	0	0+0	0	1+0	0	0+0	0
27	MF	(Honduras) HON	Oscar Boniek García	9	0	7+0	0	0+0	0	2+0	0	0+0	0
28	GK	(United States) USA	Erich Marscheider	0	0	0+0	0	0+0	0	0+0	0	0+0	0
32	DF	(United States) USA	Bobby Boswell	13	0	11+0	0	0+0	0	2+0	0	0+0	0
			Own goals for	0	1	0+0	1	0+0	0	0+0	0	0+0	0

Statistics current as of May 10, 2013
Source: Houston Dynamo Season Statistics

=== Top scorers ===
Rank	Pos	No.	Player	MLS	MLS Cup Playoffs	CONCACAF	U.S. Open Cup	Total
1	FW	23	Will Bruin	8	2	0	0	10
1	FW	12	Giles Barnes	9	0	0	0	9
2	MF	11	Brad Davis	2	0	1	0	3
2	MF	20	Andrew Driver	3	0	0	0	3
3	DF	5	Warren Creavalle	2	0	0	0	2
4	MF	13	Ricardo Clark	1	0	0	0	1

== Club ==
=== Coaching staff ===
Position	Staff
Head Coach	(United States) Dominic Kinnear
Assistant coach & Reserve Team Manager	(United States) Wade Barrett
Assistant coach & Reserve Team Manager	(United States) Steve Ralston
Goalkeeper coach	(United States) Tim Hanley
Head Athletic Trainer	(United States) Theron Enns
Assistant Athletic Trainer	(United States) Shane Caron
Director, Soccer Operations	(United States) Nick Kowba
Equipment Manager	(United States) Michael Porter
Director, Youth Development	(England) James Clarkson
Assistant director, Youth Development	(United States) Eddie Robinson
Youth Development Coordinator	(United States) Michael Fasching
U-18 assistant coach	(United States) Scot Fraser

Last updated: 10 January 2013
Source: Houston Dynamo

=== Other information ===
Owner	(United States) Philip Anschutz
Co-Owners	(United States) Oscar De La Hoya (United States) Gabriel Brener
President of Business Operations	(United States) Chris Canetti
Executive Vice President	(England) Steven Powell
Senior Vice President	(United States) David Tagliarino
Ground (capacity and dimensions)	BBVA Compass Stadium (22,039 / 115x70 yards)
Training ground	Houston Amateur Sports Park

Updated to match played 10 January 2013
Source: Houston Dynamo

== Transfers ==
=== In ===
==== Winter ====
Squad #	Position	Player	Transferred From	Notes	Date	Source
2	DF	(United States) Eric Brunner	(United States) Portland Timbers	Undisclosed	3 December 2012	
7	FW	(Jamaica) Omar Cummings	(United States) Colorado Rapids	Undisclosed	22 December 2012	
14	FW	(Jamaica) Jason Johnson	(United States) VCU Rams	SuperDraft	17 January 2013	
10	MF	(Honduras) Alexander López	(Honduras) C.D. Olimpia	Undisclosed	7 August 2013	

=== Out ===
==== Winter ====
Squad #	Position	Player	Transferred To	Notes	Date	Source
6	MF	(United States) Nathan Sturgis	(United States) Colorado Rapids	Undisclosed	22 December 2012	
31	DF	(Canada) Andre Hainault	(Scotland) Ross County F.C.	Free transfer	10 January 2013	
18	MF	(United States) Josue Soto	Unattached	Waived	24 January 2013	
9	FW	(Senegal) Macoumba Kandji	(Greece) AEL Kalloni	Free transfer	28 January 2013	

== Pre-season and friendlies ==
24 January 2013 Friendly	Houston Dynamo	3–0	Houston Dynamo Academy	Houston, Texas
15:00 CST	Taylor 7'; Weaver 17'; Creavalle 83'	Match report		Stadium: Houston Amateur Sports Park

26 January 2013 Friendly	Houston Dynamo	3–0	Houston Baptist University	Houston, Texas
11:00 CST	Weaver 15', 18'; Barnes 43'	Match report		Stadium: Houston Amateur Sports Park

29 January 2013 Friendly	Houston Dynamo	0–2	San Jose Earthquakes	Tucson, Arizona
15:00 MST		Match report	Emerson 56', 86' (pen.)	Stadium: Kino Sports Complex

31 January 2013 Friendly	Houston Dynamo	1–0	Colorado Rapids	Tucson, Arizona
18:00 MST	Elliott 1'	Match report		Stadium: Kino Sports Complex

2 February 2013 Friendly	Houston Dynamo	1–2	Vancouver Whitecaps FC	Tucson, Arizona
18:00 MST	Boswell 30'		Mattocks 33'; Hertzog 64'	Stadium: Kino Sports Complex

6 February 2013 Friendly	Houston Dynamo	6–1	Houston Baptist University	Houston, Texas
19:00 CST	Ownby 12'; Barnes 15'; Weaver 51', 69'; Dixon 75'; Arena 81'		Kromholz 10'	Stadium: Sorrels Field

9 February 2013 Friendly	Houston Dynamo	2–2	Southern Methodist University	Houston, Texas
10:00 CST	Watson 62'; Ching 87'		Brunner 15' (o.g.); Leobardo Vazquez 60'	Stadium: Houston Amateur Sports Park

12 February 2013 Friendly	Houston Dynamo	11–0	Houston Dynamo Academy	Houston, Texas
15:00 CST	Dener Dos Santos 14' (o.g.); Clark 41'; Weaver 41'; Bruin 46', 52', 77', 81', 83'; Johnson 58' (pen.); Dixon 71'; Moffat 74'			Stadium: Houston Amateur Sports Park

16 February 2013 Carolina Challenge Cup	Houston Dynamo	2–3	Chicago Fire	Charleston, South Carolina
17:00 EST	Moffat 15'; Weaver 64'		MacDonald 23'; Duka 27'; Larentowicz 48'	Stadium: Blackbaud Stadium

20 February 2013 Carolina Challenge Cup	Houston Dynamo	2–1	Vancouver Whitecaps FC	Charleston, South Carolina
17:00 EST	Bruin 75'; Moffat 77'		Hertzog 27'	Stadium: Blackbaud Stadium

23 February 2013 Carolina Challenge Cup	Charleston Battery	2–1	Houston Dynamo	Charleston, South Carolina
19:15 EST	Kelly 18'; Savage 74'		Barnes 16'	Stadium: Blackbaud Stadium

== Competitions ==
=== Overall ===
Competition	Started round	Current position / round	Final position / round	First match	Last match
Major League Soccer	—	—		2 March 2013	27 October 2013
2012–13 CONCACAF Champions League	Group stage	—	Quarterfinals	22 August 2012	13 March 2013
U.S. Open Cup	Third round	—		May–June, 2013	

Updated to match played 13 January 2013
Source: Competitions

=== Major League Soccer ===
==== Eastern Conference ====
Pos	Team	Pld	W	L	T	GF	GA	GD	Pts	Qualification
1	New York Red Bulls	34	17	9	8	58	41	+17	59	MLS Cup Conference Semifinals
2	Sporting Kansas City	34	17	10	7	47	30	+17	58	MLS Cup Conference Semifinals
3	New England Revolution	34	14	11	9	49	38	+11	51	MLS Cup Conference Semifinals
4	Houston Dynamo	34	14	11	9	41	41	0	51	MLS Cup Knockout Round
5	Montreal Impact	34	14	13	7	50	49	+1	49	MLS Cup Knockout Round
6	Chicago Fire	34	14	13	7	47	52	−5	49	
7	Philadelphia Union	34	12	12	10	42	44	−2	46	
8	Columbus Crew	34	12	17	5	42	46	−4	41	
9	Toronto FC	34	6	17	11	30	47	−17	29	
10	D.C. United	34	3	24	7	22	59	−37	16	

Source: MLS

==== Supporters' Shield ====
Pos	Team	Pld	W	L	T	GF	GA	GD	Pts	Qualification
1	New York Red Bulls (S)	34	17	9	8	58	41	+17	59	CONCACAF Champions League
2	Sporting Kansas City (C)	34	17	10	7	47	30	+17	58	CONCACAF Champions League
3	Portland Timbers	34	14	5	15	54	33	+21	57	CONCACAF Champions League
4	Real Salt Lake	34	16	10	8	57	41	+16	56	
5	LA Galaxy	34	15	11	8	53	38	+15	53	
6	Seattle Sounders FC	34	15	12	7	42	42	0	52	
7	New England Revolution	34	14	11	9	49	38	+11	51	
8	Colorado Rapids	34	14	11	9	45	38	+7	51	
9	Houston Dynamo	34	14	11	9	41	41	0	51	
10	San Jose Earthquakes	34	14	11	9	35	42	−7	51	
11	Montreal Impact	34	14	13	7	50	49	+1	49	CONCACAF Champions League
12	Chicago Fire	34	14	13	7	47	52	−5	49	
13	Vancouver Whitecaps FC	34	13	12	9	53	45	+8	48	
14	Philadelphia Union	34	12	12	10	42	44	−2	46	
15	FC Dallas	34	11	12	11	48	52	−4	44	
16	Columbus Crew	34	12	17	5	42	46	−4	41	
17	Toronto FC	34	6	17	11	30	47	−17	29	
18	Chivas USA	34	6	20	8	30	67	−37	26	
19	D.C. United	34	3	24	7	22	59	−37	16	CONCACAF Champions League

Source: MLS
Rules for classification: 1) points; 2) head-to-head record; 3) goal difference; 4) number of goals scored
(C) MLS Cup Champion; (S) Supporters' Shield

==== Results summary ====
Overall								Home						Away					
Pld	W	D	L	GF	GA	GD	Pts	W	D	L	GF	GA	GD	W	D	L	GF	GA	GD
22	9	6	7	26	8	+18	33	6	3	2	14	6	+8	3	3	5	12	2	+10

Last updated: 2 March 2013.
Source: Major League Soccer

==== Results by round ====
Round	1	2	3	4	5	6	7	8	9	10	11	12	13	14	15	16	17	18	19	20	21	22	23	24	25	26	27	28	29	30	31	32	33	34
Stadium	H	A	H	H	A	H	A	H	A	A	H	H	A	A	A	H	A	H	A	H	H	A	H	A	A	A	H	A	H	A	H	H	H	A
Result	W	L	W	W	L	W	D	D	W	W	L	L	D	D	L	D	L	W	W	D	W	L	W	L	D	L	L	W						

Updated to match(es) played on 13 January 2013. Source: Houston Dynamo
A = Away; H = Home; W = Win; D = Draw; L = Loss

==== Matches ====
Win Tie Loss

March 2, 2013 Match 1	Houston Dynamo	2–0	D.C. United	Houston
19:00 CST	Riley 80' (o.g.); Clark 89'	Report	Wooloard (yellow card) 15'; Korb (yellow card) 40'	Stadium: BBVA Compass Stadium; Attendance: 20,019; Referee: Baldomero Toledo

March 17, 2013 Match 2 Texas Derby	FC Dallas	3–2	Houston Dynamo	Frisco, Texas
12:00 CST	John 34'; Jacobson 36'; Cooper 90'	Report	Sarkodie (yellow card) 55'; Driver 79'; Davis 83'	Stadium: FC Dallas Stadium; Attendance: 15,623; Referee: Jair Marrufo

March 23, 2013 Match 3	Houston Dynamo	2–1	Vancouver Whitecaps FC	Houston
19:30 CDT	Barnes 55'; Moffat (yellow card) 61'; Creavalle 62'	Report	Mattocks 36'; Reo-Coker (yellow card) 52'	Stadium: BBVA Compass Stadium; Attendance: 16,428; Referee: Matthew Foerster

March 30, 2013 Match 4	Houston Dynamo	2–0	San Jose Earthquakes	Houston
19:30 CDT	Bruin 17'; Moffat (yellow card) 22'; Barnes 42'	Report	Harden (yellow card) 53'; Bernárdez (yellow card) 75'	Stadium: BBVA Compass Stadium; Attendance: 17,415; Referee: Jose Carlos Rivero

April 6, 2013 Match 5	Portland Timbers	2–0	Houston Dynamo	Portland, Oregon
21:30 CDT	Silvestre (yellow card) 47'; R. Johnson 55', 73'	Report	Driver (yellow card) 36'	Stadium: Jeld-Wen Field; Attendance: 20,674; Referee: Ricardo Salazar

April 14, 2013 Match 6	Houston Dynamo	2–1	Chicago Fire	Houston
16:00 CDT	Bruin 26'; Davis 81'; Ashe (yellow card) 93'	Report	Rolfe 29'; Paladini (yellow card) 55'	Stadium: BBVA Compass Stadium; Attendance: 18,942; Referee: Edvin Jurisevic

April 20, 2013 Match 7	Toronto FC	1–1	Houston Dynamo	Toronto, Ontario
15:00 CDT	Hall 58'; Lambe (yellow card) 62'	Report	Camargo (yellow card) 54'; Taylor (red card) 62'; Ashe (yellow card) 65'; Creavalle (yellow card) 87' (goal) 90+4'	Stadium: BMO Field; Attendance: 15,973; Referee: Drew Fischer

April 28, 2013 Match 8	Houston Dynamo	1–1	Colorado Rapids	Houston, Texas
16:00 CDT	Barnes 66'; Clark (yellow card) 69'; Boswell (yellow card) 87'; Davis (yellow card) 90+1' (red card) 90+5'	Report	Moor 45+2'; O'Neill (yellow card) 70'; Sturgis (yellow card) 72'	Stadium: BBVA Compass Stadium; Attendance: 19,839; Referee: Juan Guzman

May 5, 2013 Match 9	Los Angeles Galaxy	0–1	Houston Dynamo	Los Angeles
22:00 CDT		Report	Driver 56'	Stadium: Home Depot Center; Attendance: 20,071; Referee: Allen Chapman

May 8, 2013 Match 10	D.C. United	0–4	Houston Dynamo	Washington, D.C.
18:00 CDT	Saragosa (yellow card) 77'	Report	Bruin 16', 78'; Barnes 28'; Driver (yellow card) 44' (goal) 88'; Ching (yellow card) 64'; Sarkodie (yellow card) 65'	Stadium: RFK Stadium; Attendance: 10,116; Referee: Jorge González

May 12, 2013 Match 11	Houston Dynamo	0–1	Sporting Kansas City	Houston
19:00 CDT	Driver (yellow card) 29'; Ashe (yellow card) 71'	Report	Collin (yellow card) 24' (goal) 73'; Rosell (yellow card) 40'	Stadium: BBVA Compass Stadium; Attendance: 19,004; Referee: Chris Penso

May 18, 2013 Match 12	Houston Dynamo	0–2	New England Revolution	Houston
19:30 CDT	García (yellow card) 26'; Boswell (red card) 40'; Sarkodie (yellow card) 58'	Report	Imbongo (red card) 40'; McCarthy (yellow card) 47'; Fagúndez 51'; Shuttleworth (yellow card) 82'; Clark 84' (o.g.)	Stadium: BBVA Compass Stadium; Attendance: 22,039; Referee: Edvin Jurisevic

May 26, 2013 Match 13	Sporting Kansas City	1–1	Houston Dynamo	Kansas City, Kansas
14:30 CDT	Sinovic (yellow card) 57'; Kamara 68'	Report	Davis 45+1'; Barnes (yellow card) 50'	Stadium: Sporting Park; Attendance: 20,876; Referee: Drew Fischer

June 1, 2013 Match 14	Columbus Crew	1–1	Houston Dynamo	Columbus, Ohio
18:30 CDT	Meram (yellow card) 66'; Higuaín 69'	Report	Creavalle 31'; Camargo (yellow card) 54'; Driver (yellow card) 78'	Stadium: Columbus Crew Stadium; Attendance: 11,040; Referee: Allen Chapman

June 19, 2013 Match 15	Montreal Impact	2–0	Houston Dynamo	Montreal
19:00 CDT				Stadium: Stade Saputo

June 22, 2013 Match 16	Houston Dynamo	0–0	Toronto FC	Houston
20:00 CDT				Stadium: BBVA Compass Stadium; Attendance: 22,039; Referee: Ricardo Salazar

June 30, 2013 Match 17	New York Red Bulls	2–0	Houston Dynamo	Harrison, New Jersey
13:00 CDT				Stadium: Red Bull Arena

July 6, 2013 Match 18	Houston Dynamo	1–0	Philadelphia Union	Houston
20:00 CDT				Stadium: BBVA Compass Stadium

July 13, 2013 Match 19	New England Revolution	1–2	Houston Dynamo	Foxborough, Massachusetts
18:30 CDT				Stadium: Gillette Stadium

July 20, 2013 Match 20	Houston Dynamo	1–1	Chicago Fire	Houston
20:00 CDT				Stadium: BBVA Compass Stadium

July 27, 2013 Match 21	Houston Dynamo	3–1	Columbus Crew	Houston
20:00 CDT				Stadium: BBVA Compass Stadium

August 10, 2013 Match 22	Real Salt Lake	1–0	Houston Dynamo	Sandy, Utah
20:30 CDT				Stadium: Rio Tinto Stadium

August 17, 2013 Match 23	Houston Dynamo	3–1	Seattle Sounders FC	Houston
20:00 CDT	Barnes 17'; Barnes 21'; Bruin 74'; Garcia (yellow card) 83'	Report	Gonzales (yellow card) 42'; Joseph 65'	Stadium: BBVA Compass Stadium; Attendance: 22,289; Referee: Baldomero Toledo

August 24, 2013 Match 24	Montreal Impact	5–0	Houston Dynamo	Montreal
18:00 CDT	Di Vaio 35'; Felipe 37'; Brovsky 58'; Di Vaio 70'; Pisanu 90+1'	Report	Driver 72'	Stadium: Stade Saputo; Attendance: 20,081; Referee: Hilario Grajeda

September 1, 2013 Match 25	Chicago Fire	1–1	Houston Dynamo	Bridgeview, Illinois
16:00 CDT	Rolfe (yellow card) 40'; Boswell 70' (o.g.)	Report	Creavalle (yellow card) 51'; Moffat 90'	Stadium: Toyota Park; Attendance: 17,808; Referee: Drew Fischer

September 4, 2013 Match 26	Columbus Crew	2–0	Houston Dynamo	Columbus, Ohio
18:30 CDT	Finley 47'; Meram 74'; Meram (yellow card) 77'	Report	Weaver (yellow card) 80'	Stadium: Columbus Crew Stadium; Attendance: 14,360; Referee: Jair Marrufo

September 8, 2013 Match 27	Houston Dynamo	1–4	New York Red Bulls	Houston
16:00 CDT	Johnson 18'		Alexander 14'; Henry 47'; Steele 58'; Sam 88'	Stadium: BBVA Compass Stadium; Attendance: 18,501

September 14, 2013 Match 28	Philadelphia Union	0–1	Houston Dynamo	Chester, Pennsylvania
18:30 CDT				Stadium: PPL Park; Attendance: 18,771

September 21, 2013 Match 29	Houston Dynamo	5–1	Chivas USA	Houston
19:30 CDT				Stadium: BBVA Compass Stadium; Attendance: 20m157

September 28, 2013 Match 30	New England Revolution	1–1	Houston Dynamo	Foxborough, Massachusetts
18:30 CDT				Stadium: Gillette Stadium; Attendance: 21,297

October 4, 2013 Match 31	Houston Dynamo	1–0	Montreal Impact	Houston
19:30 CDT				Stadium: BBVA Compass Stadium; Attendance: 19,892

October 9, 2013 Match 32	Houston Dynamo	0–0	Sporting Kansas City	Houston
19:30 CDT				Stadium: BBVA Compass Stadium; Attendance: 16,433

October 20, 2013 Match 33	Houston Dynamo	0–3	New York Red Bulls	Houston
16:00 CDT				Stadium: BBVA Compass Stadium; Attendance: 22,345

October 27, 2013 Match 34	D.C. United	1–2	Houston Dynamo	Washington, D.C.
12:30 CDT				Stadium: RFK Stadium; Attendance: 13,731

=== U.S. Open Cup ===
May 29, 2013 Third round	Houston Dynamo	2–0	FC Tucson	Houston, Texas
7:30 PM CDT	Dixon 26'; Creavalle (yellow card) 71'; Barnes 85'	Report	Robinson (yellow card) 26'; Zimmerman (yellow card) 84'	Stadium: BBVA Compass Stadium; Attendance: 2917; Referee: Eli Aguilar

June 12, 2013 Fourth Round	FC Dallas	3-0	Houston Dynamo	Frisco, Texas
8:00 CDT	Cooper 37', 59'; Castillo (yellow card) 67'; Loyd 76'	Report		Stadium: FC Dallas Stadium; Attendance: 4006; Referee: Juan Guzman

=== MLS Cup Playoffs ===
Kickoff time for Knockout round is in CDT while rest of games are in CST.

==== Knockout round ====
October 31 Knockout Round	Houston Dynamo	3–0	Montreal Impact	Houston
7:30pm	Bruin 16', 72'; García 27'; Ashe (yellow card) 89'	Report	Rivas (yellow card) 35' (yellow-red card) 70'; Romero (red card) 89'; Di Vaio (red card) 89'	Stadium: BBVA Compass Stadium; Attendance: 10,476; Referee: Mark Geiger

==== Conference semifinals ====
November 3 Leg 1	Houston Dynamo	2–2	New York Red Bulls	Houston
2:30pm	Clark 51'; García (yellow card) 62'; Cummings 90+2'	Report	Cahill 22'; Alexander 32' (Jonathan) Steele (yellow card) 36'; Henry (yellow card) 54'; Olave (red card) 65'; Barklage (yellow card) 84'; Carney (yellow card) 84'	Stadium: BBVA Compass Stadium; Attendance: 20,626; Referee: Ricardo Salazar

November 6 Leg 2	New York Red Bulls	1–2 (a.e.t.) (3–4 agg.)	Houston Dynamo	Harrison, New Jersey
7:00pm	Wright-Phillips 23'; Barklage (yellow card) 25'	Report	Davis 36'; Ashe (yellow card) 93'; Cummings 104'	Stadium: Red Bull Arena; Attendance: 22,264; Referee: Silviu Petrescu

==== Conference finals ====
November 9 Leg 1	Houston Dynamo	0–0	Sporting Kansas City	Houston
1:30pm		Report		Stadium: BBVA Compass Stadium; Attendance: 22,107; Referee: Kevin Slott

November 23 Leg 2	Sporting Kansas City	2–1 (2–1 agg.)	Houston Dynamo	Kansas City, Kansas
6:30pm	Sapong 14'; Dwyer 63'	Report	García 3'	Stadium: Sporting Park; Attendance: 21,650; Referee: Baldomero Toledo

=== CONCACAF Champions League ===
==== Group stage ====
Group 3
Team	Pld	W	D	L	GF	GA	GD	Pts
(United States) Houston Dynamo	4	2	2	0	9	3	+6	8
(Honduras) Olimpia	4	1	2	1	6	4	+2	5
(El Salvador) FAS	4	1	0	3	3	11	−8	3

August 22, 2012	FAS (El Salvador)	1–3	(United States) Houston Dynamo	Estadio Cuscatlán, San Salvador
22:00	Águila 64'	Report	Ching 12'; Weaver 19'; Sarkodie 60'	Attendance: 2,510; Referee: Marcos Brea (Cuba)

August 30, 2012	Olimpia (Honduras)	1–1	(United States) Houston Dynamo	Estadio Tiburcio Carías Andino, Tegucigalpa
22:00	Caetano 6'	Report	Moffat 57'	Attendance: 3,645; Referee: Marco Rodríguez (Mexico)

September 20, 2012	Houston Dynamo (United States)	4–0	(El Salvador) FAS	BBVA Compass Stadium, Houston
20:00	Barnes 21'; Boswell 44'; Weaver 49'; Carr 78'	Report		Attendance: 16,117; Referee: Francisco Chacón (Mexico)

October 23, 2012	Houston Dynamo (United States)	1–1	(Honduras) Olimpia	BBVA Compass Stadium, Houston
20:00	Hainault 65'	Report	Caetano 21'	Attendance: 19,462; Referee: Juan Guerra (Guatemala)

==== Knockout phase ====
===== Quarterfinals =====
March 5, 2013 First leg	Houston Dynamo (United States)	1–0	(Mexico) Santos Laguna	Houston
19:00 CDT	Daivs 89'	Report		Stadium: BBVA Compass Stadium; Attendance: 17,454; Referee: Roberto Moreno (Panama)

March 13, 2013 Second leg	Santos Laguna (Mexico)	3–0	(United States) Houston Dynamo	Torreón, Mexico
19:00 CDT	Rodríguez 23'; Gomez 28'; Salinas (yellow card) 30'; Crosas 76'	Report	Creavalle (yellow card) 21'	Stadium: Estadio Corona; Attendance: 27,563; Referee: Enrico Wijngaarde
