= Kofi Sarkodie =

American soccer player (born 1991)

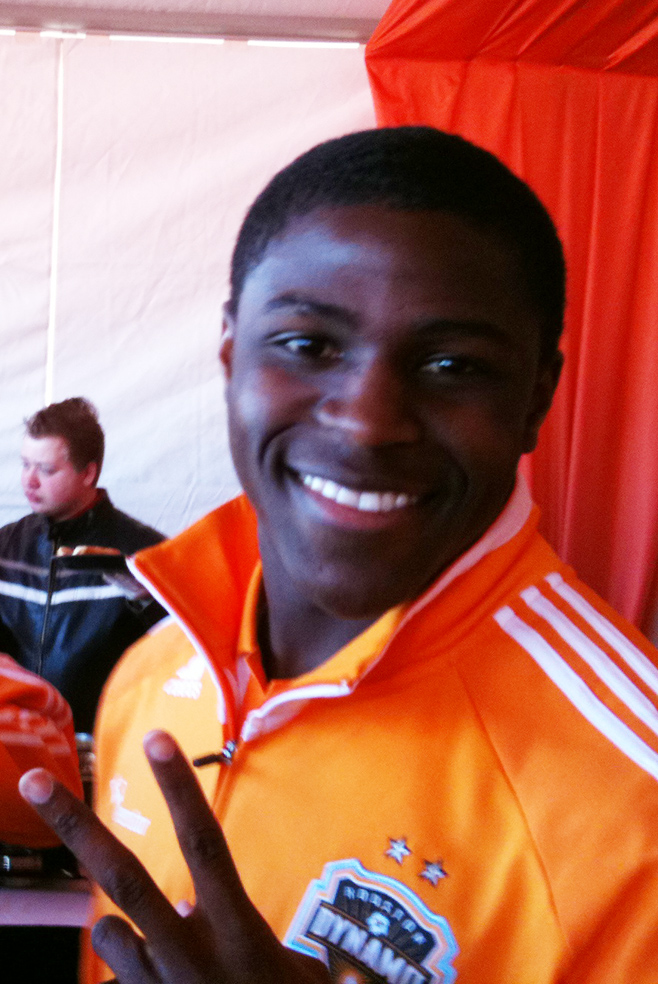
- Sarkodie at the Houston Dynamo's ground breaking

Personal information
- Full name: Kofi Kwarteng Frempong Sarkodie
- Date of birth: March 22, 1991 (age 35)
- Place of birth: Dayton, Ohio, United States
- Height: 5 ft 9 in (1.75 m)
- Position: Defender

Youth career
- 2006–2008: IMG Soccer Academy

College career
Years	Team	Apps	(Gls)
2008–2010	Akron Zips	69	(12)

Senior career*
Years	Team	Apps	(Gls)
2010	Michigan Bucks	0	(0)
2011–2015	Houston Dynamo	98	(0)
2016–2017	San Jose Earthquakes	32	(0)
2018	Trelleborgs FF	11	(0)
2021	Austin Bold	22	(1)

International career
2006–2008	United States U17	17	(3)
2008–2009	United States U18	9	(1)
2010–2011	United States U20	3	(0)
2012	United States U23	3	(0)
- * Club domestic league appearances and goals as of November 6, 2021

Kofi Kwarteng Frempong Sarkodie (born March 22, 1991) is an American soccer player. A defender, he won the 2010 national championship with the University of Akron and was named Soccer America Player of the Year before the Houston Dynamo selected him seventh overall in the 2011 MLS SuperDraft. He helped Houston reach MLS Cup 2012 and was the club's Defensive Player of the Year in 2013. He later played for the San Jose Earthquakes and Swedish club Trelleborgs FF, and signed with Austin Bold FC in 2021. At international level, he represented the United States at under-17 to under-23 level, including at the 2007 FIFA U-17 World Cup.

== Career ==
=== Youth, college and amateur ===
After graduating from the IMG Soccer Academy in 2008, Sarkodie attended the University of Akron. Sarkodie started in all 23 games as a freshman and scored in his very first game against Notre Dame. He made the Soccer America All-Freshman first team honoree and was first team All-MAC. As a sophomore, he was also awarded first team All-MAC for the second year in a row. Sarkodie had a breakout year in 2010, finishing with eight goals and six assists, helping the Zips to a College Cup. Accolades Sarkodie was awarded following his junior season included NSCAA All-America first team, Soccer America Player of the Year, Top Drawer Soccer Team of the Season first team, College Cup Most Outstanding Defensive Player, College Cup All-Tournament Team, and his third straight first team All-MAC selection.

While in college, Sarkodie was also a member of the Michigan Bucks of the USL Premier Development League but he never made an appearance for the club.

=== Professional ===
==== Houston Dynamo ====
On January 13, 2011, Sarkodie was drafted in the first round (seventh overall) by the Houston Dynamo in the 2011 MLS SuperDraft. He made his professional debut on March 25, getting the start in a 1–1 draw with Seattle Sounders FC. Sarkodie made 7 MLS appearances his rookie season, as well as one appearance in the Open Cup, as the Dynamo finished 2nd in the Eastern Conference. However, Sarkodie did not feature in the playoffs as the Dynamo reached MLS Cup 2011.

During the 2012 season, Sarkodie barely played for the first 6 months, making 2 appearances for 20 minutes total during the first 26 MLS games. In August, Sarkodie played well in CONCACAF Champions League play and earned himself more league minutes, making a substitute appearance on September 2 in a 3–1 loss to the Chicago Fire. He made his first MLS start of the season four days later in a 1–0 win over Real Salt Lake and started Houston's final 7 MLS games of the season. Sarkodie ended the 2012 MLS regular season with 10 appearances and 1 assist, helping the Dynamo finish 5th in the East and qualify for the playoffs. On November 11, he scored his first professional goal to help Houston to a 3–1 victory against D.C. United in leg 1 of the Eastern Conference Finals. Sarkodie started all 6 of Houston's games and scored 1 goal during the 2012 MLS Cup Playoffs, helping the Dynamo reach MLS Cup 2012, where Houston lost to the LA Galaxy for the second straight year, this time by a score of 3–1. Sarkodie also made 3 appearances and had 1 assists during the Champions League group stage, helping Houston finish top of their group.

On March 2, 2013, Sarkodie started the Dynamo's opening match of the season, a 2–0 win over D.C. United. Sarkodie appeared in 33 of Houston's 34 MLS regular season matches, all of them starts, as well as picking up 4 assists. He helped the Dynamo finish 4th in the Eastern Conference and qualify for the playoffs. On November 6, Sarkodie picked up an assist in extra time to help Houston defeat the New York Red Bulls 2–1 in leg 2 of the Eastern Conference Semifinals, giving the Dynamo a 4–3 aggregate win. He played the full match in all 5 of Houston's playoff games as they reached the Conference Finals, where they lost 2–1 to Sporting Kansas City on aggregate. During the season, Sarkodie also played once in the Open Cup, played in both legs of Houston's 2012–13 CCL quarterfinals aggregate loss to Santos Laguna, and made 3 appearances during the 2013–14 CCL group stage, as the Dynamo finished 2nd in their group, failing to advance. Following the season, Sarkodie was named the 2013 Dynamo Defensive Player of the Year.

Sarkodie enjoyed another strong season in 2014, making 32 MLS appearances, all starts, and recording 4 assists. However, it was a poor season for Houston as a team, finishing 8th in the conference and missing out on the playoffs. He also made 2 Open Cup appearances during the season.

In the opening game of the 2015 season, Sarkodie collided heads with teammate Raúl Rodríguez early during a match against the Columbus Crew, creating a rather large gash on Sarkodie's head. The trainers wrapped up his head and gave him a clean jersey without blood, and Sarkodie returned to the game. Later in the match, the referee ordered Sarkodie off the pitch so the trainers could re-bandage his head and give him another clean jersey, this time without his name and number on the back. Soon after returning to the field, Sarkodie picked up an assist after setting up Giles Barnes, giving Houston a 1–0 win. Sarkodie ended the regular season with 16 appearances and 1 assist, but saw his playing time decrease towards the end of the season as he dealt with a bone bruise in his right knee. It was another disappointing season for Houston, as they missed out on the playoffs after finishing 8th in the Western Conference.

==== San Jose Earthquakes ====
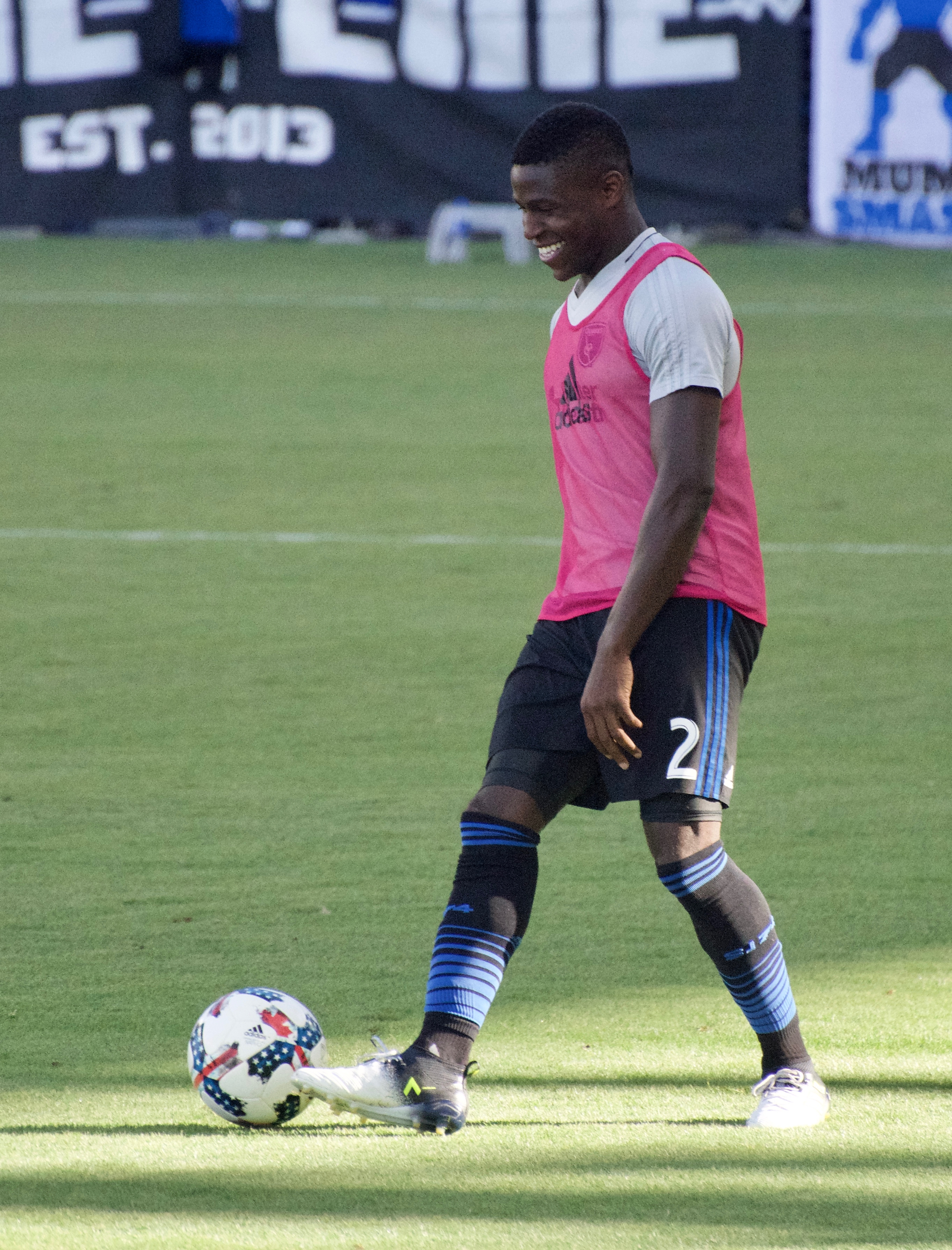
Sarkodie with the Earthquakes in 2017

On April 1, 2016, Sarkodie joined the San Jose Earthquakes in exchange for targeted allocation money in a sign-and-trade deal with Houston, reuniting him with former Dynamo head coach Dominic Kinnear. He made his Earthquakes debut on April 16, playing the full match in a 3–1 loss to the Portland Timbers. In July, Sarkodie suffered an ankle injury that kept him out for months. He ended his first season in San Jose with 13 MLS appearances and 1 in the Open Cup as the Earthquakes finished 9th in the Western Conference, failing to qualify for the playoffs.

On January 26, 2017, Sarkodie signed a new contract with San Jose. He made 18 appearances and had 1 assist during the regular season, helping the Earthquakes finish 6th in the Western Conference and qualify for the playoffs. Sarkodie got the start in San Jose's opening game of the playoffs, a 5–0 loss to Vancouver Whitecaps FC.

His contract with the Earthquakes expired following the 2017 season.

==== Trelleborgs FF ====
On July 13, 2018, Sarkodie signed with Swedish Allsvenskan club Trelleborgs FF. He made his debut on July 30, playing the full 90 minutes in a 3–1 loss to Hammarby IF. Sarkodie made 11 appearances for Trelleborgs as they finished last in the Allsvenskan and were relegated to the Superettan. He left the club at the end of 2018.

==== Austin Bold FC ====
On February 27, 2021, Sarkodie returned to professional soccer and the state of Texas by signing with Austin Bold FC of the USL Championship.

== International ==
Sarkodie represented the United States at youth level. He was a member of the U-17 squad at the 2007 FIFA U-17 World Cup in South Korea, and also played for the U-18 team. He won three caps for the U-20 team, and in early 2011 was in head coach Thomas Rongen's player pool ahead of the qualifying tournament for the 2011 FIFA U-20 World Cup.

In late 2011, Sarkodie began attending U-23 training camps under Caleb Porter, his former coach at Akron. He started at right back in a 2–0 win over Mexico on February 29, 2012, and the following month was named to the U-23 roster for the CONCACAF Olympic qualifying tournament.

As the son of Ghanaian parents, Sarkodie was also eligible to represent Ghana. In 2011 he said that he intended to play for the United States, but was "leaving my options open".

== Career statistics ==
As of January 26, 2021

Club	Season	League			Cup (Note: Includes U.S. Open Cup and Svenska Cupen)		Playoffs (Note: Includes MLS Cup Playoffs)		Continental		Total	
Club	Season	Division	Apps	Goals	Apps	Goals	Apps	Goals	Apps	Goals	Apps	Goals
Houston Dynamo	2011	MLS	7	0	1	0	0	0	—		8	0
Houston Dynamo	2012	MLS	10	0	0	0	6	1	3 (Note: Appearances in CONCACAF Champions League)	0	19	1
Houston Dynamo	2013	MLS	33	0	1	0	5	0	5	0	44	0
Houston Dynamo	2014	MLS	32	0	2	0	—		—		34	0
Houston Dynamo	2015	MLS	16	0	3	0	—		—		19	0
Houston Dynamo	Dynamo Total		98	0	7	0	11	1	8	0	124	1
San Jose Earthquakes	2016	MLS	13	0	1	0	—		—		14	0
San Jose Earthquakes	2017	MLS	18	0	2	0	1	0	—		21	0
San Jose Earthquakes	Earthquakes Total		31	0	3	0	1	0	0	0	35	0
Trelleborgs FF	2018	Allsvenskan	11	0	0	0	—		—		11	0
Career Total			140	0	10	0	12	1	8	0	170	1

== Honors ==
=== University of Akron ===
- NCAA Men's Division I Soccer Championship: 2010
- Mid-American Conference Tournament: 2008, 2009, 2010

=== Individual ===
- NCAA Division I Men's Soccer Tournament Defensive Most Outstanding Player: 2010
- Soccer America Player of the Year Award: 2010
- Dynamo Defensive Player of the Year: 2013

== Personal life ==
Sarkodie was born and raised in Dayton, Ohio. His parents, Amaning and Olivia, are both originally from Kumasi, Ghana. Olivia's mother, Kofi's grandmother, was the tribal queen of her village. Sarkodie has two brothers, Kwame and Ofori, and one sister, Mimi. Kwame played college soccer for Cincinnati while Ofori played for Indiana.
