= Bryan Salazar =

American soccer player

Personal information
- Date of birth: October 17, 1994 (age 32)
- Place of birth: Houston, Texas, United States
- Height: 5 ft 9 in (1.75 m)
- Position: Midfielder

Youth career
- 2007–2013: Houston Dynamo

Senior career*
Years	Team	Apps	(Gls)
2013–2014	Houston Dynamo	0	(0)
2014	→ Pittsburgh Riverhounds (loan)	1	(0)
- * Club domestic league appearances and goals as of March 25, 2014

Bryan Salazar (born October 17, 1994) is an American soccer player.

== Career ==
=== Youth ===
Salazar joined The Houston Dynamo Junior Academy at the age of 13, eventually progressing to the Dynamo U-18 squad.

=== Professional ===
On February 13, 2013, Salazar signed his first professional contract, joining the Dynamo senior squad. In doing so, Salazar became the fifth Dynamo academy player to be signed under the MLS' Homegrown Player Rule. Salazar made his professional debut on May 30, 2013, in Houston's 2-0 U.S. Open Cup victory over FC Tucson, starting at forward and playing 60 minutes.

Prior to the start of the 2014 season, Salazar, along with teammates Anthony Arena and Jason Johnson, was loaned to the Dynamo's USL Pro affiliate, the Pittsburgh Riverhounds.

== Honors ==
=== International ===
Mexico Youth

- CONCACAF U-17 Championship: 2015
