= Andrew Driver =

Footballer (born 1987)

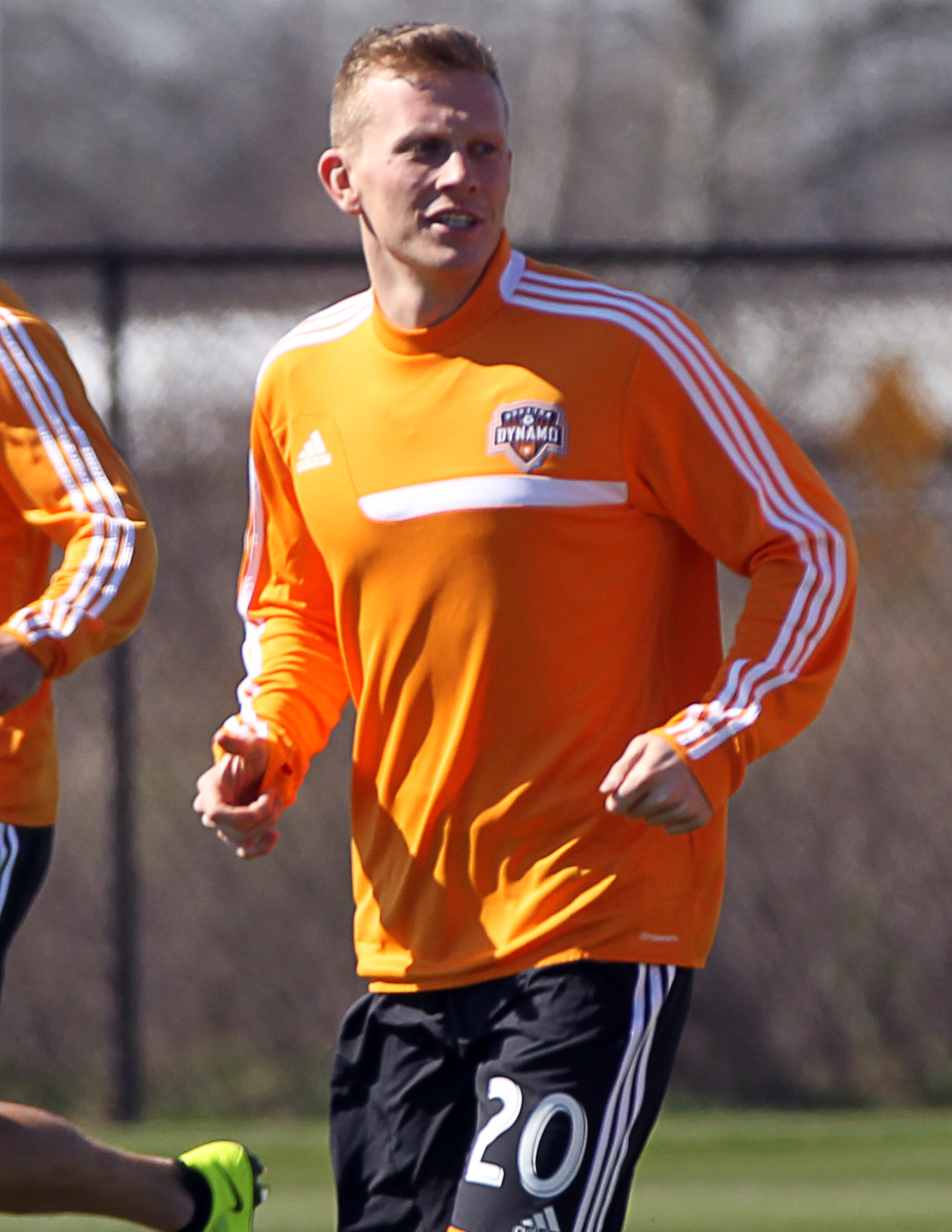
- Driver training with Houston Dynamo in 2013

Personal information
- Full name: Andrew David Driver
- Date of birth: 20 November 1987 (age 39)
- Place of birth: Saddleworth, Oldham, England
- Position: Midfielder

Youth career
- Hutchison Vale
- Heart of Midlothian

Senior career*
Years	Team	Apps	(Gls)
2006–2013	Heart of Midlothian	143	(18)
2013	→ Houston Dynamo (loan)	26	(3)
2014	Houston Dynamo	34	(0)
2015	Aberdeen	1	(0)
2015–2018	De Graafschap	83	(4)
Total		287	(25)

International career
2002	Scotland U16	4	(1)
2009	England U21	1	(0)
Medal record
Men's football
Representing England
UEFA European Under-21 Championship
Runner-up	2009 Sweden
- * Club domestic league appearances and goals

Andrew David Driver (born 20 November 1987) is a former professional footballer who played as a midfielder. He represented Scotland at schoolboy level and England, where he was born, for the under-21 side.

== Club career ==
=== Hearts ===
Driver was born in Saddleworth, Oldham, Greater Manchester, but moved to Gullane, East Lothian at the age of eleven. He began playing for Hutchison Vale AFC in Edinburgh, from where he joined the Hearts youth academy.

He first made his mark on Hearts' first team during a pre-season tour of Austria in 2006, where he started all three friendlies, creating four goals in the process with his direct play and crossing ability. In August 2006 Driver signed a five-year extension to his contract with Hearts, committing him to the club until 2011. He made his home debut in the league on 26 August 2006 against Inverness Caledonian Thistle, coming on as a substitute with 15 minutes to go and scoring four minutes later. Driver also scored a free kick in a 3–1 victory over Celtic at Celtic Park on 29 April 2007. In July 2008 Driver signed an amended contract with the club for another five years committing himself to the club until 2013.

Driver was the subject of two bids totalling £500,000 from Championship club Burnley in the summer of 2008, which was rejected by Hearts. Coventry City too made a £1 million bid in the 2009 January transfer window, which was also rejected. On 6 July, the BBC reported that Burnley had opened signing talks with Hearts. Joop Munsterman the FC Twente CEO reported on RVT Oost that Hearts had turned down a £3m offer for Driver. In all five clubs enquired about his availability including Chelsea.

In his first appearance on his return from injury Driver made his European debut against Paks in the Europa League scoring the third goal in their 4–1 win. Despite being fit Driver only appeared in seven of the first 20 competitive appearances under new manager Paulo Sérgio and a loan deal was considered, but did not come to fruition as Hearts were seeking a fee for the loan.

On 16 December the press reported that Driver was due to hand in a transfer request as he no longer wished to play under new manager Paulo Sérgio. The following day he was included in the squad as a substitute to face Dunfermline but was dropped after confirming to Sergio that he did not wish to play under him. Despite this Driver was a 62nd-minute substitute against Motherwell the following weekend replacing David Templeton.

=== Houston Dynamo ===
On 20 February 2013, Driver joined MLS side Houston Dynamo on loan until the end of the season with his contract at Hearts due to expire in June. He made his Dynamo debut on 5 March, making a substitute appearance in a 1–0 win over Mexican-side Santos Laguna in leg 1 of the CONCACAF Champions League quarterfinals. Houston lost leg 2 3–0, with Driver appearing as a sub. Driver made his MLS debut on 17 March, coming off the bench and scoring once in a 3–2 loss to Texas Derby rivals FC Dallas. On 5 May he scored to give the Dynamo a 1–0 win over the LA Galaxy. He then scored against D.C. United on 8 May in a 4–0 Dynamo win. Driver ended the MLS regular season with 3 goals and 1 assist from 26 appearances, helping Houston finish 4th in the Eastern Conference and qualify for the playoffs. In the playoffs, Driver made 5 appearances, 1 start, as the Dynamo reached the Eastern Conference Final, where they lost to Sporting Kansas City 2–1 over two legs. During the group stage of the 2013–14 CCL, Driver played twice as Houston failed to advance out of their group. He also made 2 appearances in the U.S. Open Cup during the season.

Rumours circulated that he was to rejoin old club Heart of Midlothian; however this did not happen and he went on trial at then EFL Championship club Yeovil Town. On 24 January 2014, it was confirmed that Driver has signed a new contract with Houston.

Driver and the Dynamo opened the 2014 season on 8 March with a 4–0 win over the New England Revolution. He got his first start of the season in Houston's next match, a 1–0 victory against the Montreal Impact. Driver ended the MLS regular season with 34 appearances and 1 assist as Houston finished 8th in the East, failing to qualify for the playoffs.

On 25 November 2014, Houston declined the option on Driver's contract. On 8 December 2014, his MLS rights were traded along with a 4th round pick in the 2016 MLS SuperDraft by Houston to D.C. United in exchange for Samuel Inkoom and Joe Willis.

=== Aberdeen ===
On 11 March 2015, it was announced that Driver would join Aberdeen on a short-term deal until the end of the season. He made his Aberdeen debut on 21 March, starting a 1–1 draw with Dundee. On 14 May Aberdeen announced that Driver would not be offered a new deal and would leave the club at the end of his contract.

=== De Graafschap ===
In July 2015, Driver signed a one-year deal with the Doetinchem club, who had returned to the Eredivisie following promotion in the 2014–15 season. He made his debut in a 3–0 away defeat against Excelsior Rotterdam. He signed a two-year extension with the club on 30 May 2016, even with the club on the verge of relegation to the Dutch second tier.

== International career ==
Driver was previously a Scotland schoolboy international, scoring a goal in a 2–1 Victory Shield defeat by England on 22 November 2002.

England U21 manager Stuart Pearce called the uncapped Driver up for a friendly match against Azerbaijan. He was then called up for the 2009 European Championships. He made his debut and only appearance at the tournament in the 1–1 draw against Germany on 22 June 2009 during the group stages.

He was thought to be eligible to play for the Scotland senior team because of the new residency ruling recently introduced. He was not called up by then-manager George Burley as Burley stated that it was Driver's choice to officially make himself available for selection. On 4 February 2010, Driver committed his international future to Scotland after face-to-face talks with Scotland manager Craig Levein. Only one week after opting to represent Scotland, the Scottish FA informed Driver he was not eligible to play for the national team, as he had not been schooled in Scotland for the requisite period of time. This rule was subsequently altered to allow Driver to play for Scotland, although he did not do so.

== Personal life ==
Driver holds a U.S. green card which qualified him as a domestic player for MLS roster purposes.

== Career statistics ==
=== Club ===
Appearances and goals by club, season and competition
Club	Season	League			National cup (Note: Includes Scottish Cup, U.S. Open Cup, and KNVB Cup)		League cup (Note: Includes Scottish League Cup and MLS Cup Playoffs)		Continental		Other		Total	
Club	Season	Division	Apps	Goals	Apps	Goals	Apps	Goals	Apps	Goals	Apps	Goals	Apps	Goals
Heart of Midlothian	2006–07	Scottish Premier League	20	3	2	0	0	0	0	0	—		22	3
Heart of Midlothian	2007–08	Scottish Premier League	25	5	1	0	3	0	—		—		29	5
Heart of Midlothian	2008–09	Scottish Premier League	29	5	2	0	0	0	—		—		31	5
Heart of Midlothian	2009–10	Scottish Premier League	12	3	0	0	2	0	1 (Note: Appearances in the Europa League)	0	—		15	3
Heart of Midlothian	2010–11	Scottish Premier League	14	0	0	0	0	0	—		—		14	0
Heart of Midlothian	2011–12	Scottish Premier League	21	0	6	0	1	0	2	1	—		30	1
Heart of Midlothian	2012–13	Scottish Premier League	22	2	1	0	3	0	2	0	—		28	2
Heart of Midlothian	Hearts total		143	18	12	0	9	0	5	1	0	0	169	19
Houston Dynamo (loan)	2013	Major League Soccer	26	3	2	0	5	0	4 (Note: Appearances in the CONCACAF Champions League)	0	—		37	3
Houston Dynamo	2014	Major League Soccer	34	0	2	0	—		—		—		36	0
Aberdeen	2014–15	Scottish Premiership	1	0	0	0	0	0	0	0	—		1	0
De Graafschap	2015–16	Eredivisie	27	4	0	0	—		—		2 (Note: Appearances in the Eredivisie relegation play-offs)	0	29	4
De Graafschap	2016–17	Eerste Divisie	33	0	1	0	—		—		—		34	0
De Graafschap	2017–18	Eerste Divisie	23	0	1	0	—		—		0	0	24	0
De Graafschap	Total		83	4	2	0	0	0	0	0	2	0	87	4
Career total			287	25	18	0	14	0	9	1	2	0	330	26

== Honours ==
Heart of Midlothian

- Scottish Cup: 2011–12

Individual

- Scottish Premier League Young Player of the Month: September 2007
