= Will Bruin =

American soccer player

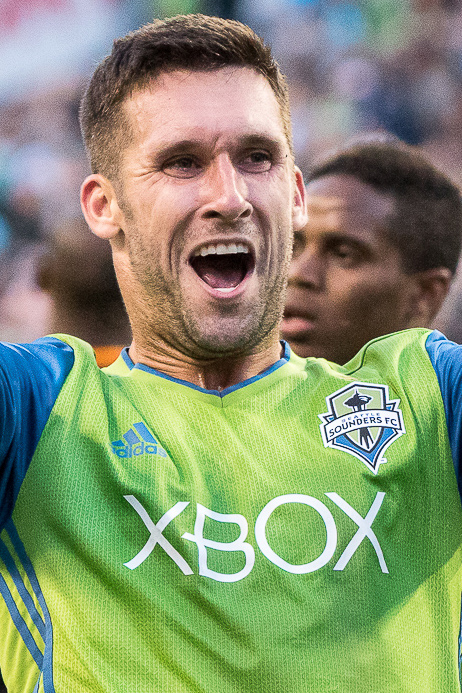
- Bruin with Seattle Sounders FC in 2017

Personal information
- Full name: William Christopher Bruin
- Date of birth: October 24, 1989 (age 37)
- Place of birth: St. Louis, Missouri, United States
- Height: 6 ft 2 in (1.88 m)
- Position: Forward

Youth career
- 2005–2007: St. Louis Scott Gallagher

College career
Years	Team	Apps	(Gls)
2008–2010	Indiana Hoosiers	66	(33)

Senior career*
Years	Team	Apps	(Gls)
2011–2016	Houston Dynamo	178	(50)
2017–2022	Seattle Sounders FC	132	(27)
2019	→ Tacoma Defiance (loan)	1	(1)
2023	Austin FC	19	(3)
Total		330	(81)

International career
2013	United States	2	(0)
Medal record
Representing United States
Winner	CONCACAF Gold Cup	2013
Men's Soccer
- * Club domestic league appearances and goals

William Christopher Bruin (born October 24, 1989) is an American former professional soccer player who played as a forward.

Bruin spent six seasons playing for the Houston Dynamo, followed by six seasons with the Seattle Sounders, where he won the MLS Cup in 2019 and the CONCACAF Champions League in 2022. He announced his professional retirement from soccer following a season with Austin FC in 2023. Bruin also made two appearances for the United States national team in 2013, and was a part of the squad that won that year's CONCACAF Gold Cup.

== Early career ==
Growing up in Greater St. Louis, Bruin played club soccer for St. Louis Scott Gallagher. He graduated from De Smet Jesuit High School in 2008, having played on the school soccer team for all four years of high school. Bruin was named the 2007 Missouri State Soccer Player of the Year and was a two time NSCAA All-American while at De Smet Jesuit. He also set the school record for goals with 102.

== College career ==
Bruin played college soccer at Indiana University for three seasons, scoring 33 goals in 66 appearances, including a team-leading 18 goals in 20 appearances during the 2010 season. He helped the Hoosiers win the 2010 Big Ten regular season championship and qualify for the NCAA Tournament in all three of his seasons. Bruin was named the 2008 Big Ten Freshman of the Year, first team All-Big Ten in 2009 and 2010, and the 2010 Big Ten Offensive Player of the Year. As a junior, he finished in second place behind Akron forward Darlington Nagbe for the 2010 Hermann Trophy. Bruin chose to forgo his final season of collegiate eligibility, instead declaring for the MLS SuperDraft and signing a Generation Adidas contract with Major League Soccer.

== Club career ==
=== Houston Dynamo ===
Bruin was selected by the Houston Dynamo with the 11th overall pick of the 2011 MLS SuperDraft. He made his professional debut on March 19, 2011, in Houston's first game of the 2011 MLS season, a 1–0 loss to the Philadelphia Union. On April 10, Bruin scored his first professional goal against Vancouver Whitecaps FC to seal a 3–1 victory. Bruin netted his first professional hat-trick in a 4–1 win against D.C. United on April 29. On July 30, he suffered a knee injury during a 3–1 win over the Seattle Sounders FC, causing him to miss over 5 weeks. He ended the regular season with 25 appearances, 5 goals, and 1 assist, helping the Dynamo finish 2nd in the Eastern Conference and qualify for the playoffs. Bruin made 3 substitute appearances in the playoffs as Houston reached MLS Cup 2011, where they lost 1–0 to the LA Galaxy, with Bruin not appearing in the match.

On April 15, Bruin scored his first goal of the season in a 1–1 draw with the Chicago Fire. He scored in the 73rd and 90th minutes on June 20 to give Houston a 3–3 draw with Toronto FC. Bruin ended the MLS regular season with 12 goals and 4 assists from 32 appearances to help Houston qualify for the playoffs. In the opening round of the playoffs, Bruin scored twice to give the Dynamo a 2–1 win over Chicago. He had a goal and an assist in Houston's next game, a 2–0 win over Sporting Kansas City in leg 1 of the Eastern Conference semifinals. Bruin and the Dynamo would lose the second leg 1–0, but advanced 2–1 on aggregate. In the first leg of the Conference finals, Bruin scored once in a 3–1 win over D.C. United. Houston and Bruin drew leg 2 to advance to MLS Cup 2012. Bruin played the full 90 minutes in MLS Cup as Houston lost to the Galaxy for the second straight season, this time by a score of 3–1. During the season, Bruin also made 2 appearances in the group stage for the 2012–13 CONCACAF Champions League.

On March 30, 2013, Bruin scored his first goal of the 2013 season in a 2–0 victory against the Earthquakes. On May 8, Bruin scored twice and had 2 assists to give the Dynamo a 4–0 win over D.C. United. He finished the MLS regular season with 8 goals and a career high 7 assists in 30 appearances to help Houston qualify for the playoffs for the third consecutive season. In their opening match of the playoffs, Bruin scored twice to help the Dynamo defeat the Montreal Impact 3–0. He would start Houston's next 3 playoff games as well, but came off injured in the first leg of the Conference Finals, a 0–0 draw against Sporting Kansas City. Bruin missed the second leg and Houston lost 2–1 to SKC. In Champions League play, Bruin started both legs of the 2012–13 CCL quarterfinals matchup with Santos Laguna, a 3–1 aggregate loss, and made 2 appearances in the group stage of the 2013–14 Champions League.

On March 8, 2014, in the opening game of the 2014 season, Bruin scored twice and had an assist as the Dynamo defeated the New England Revolution 4–0. On August 3, Bruin scored 1 minute into stoppage time to give Houston a 1–0 victory against D.C. United. On August 29, he scored once as Houston beat Kansas City 3–1, but during the game Bruin came off injured and was forced to miss the next 6 games. Bruin ended the regular season with 27 appearances, 10 goals, and 1 assist, however it was a poor season for the Dynamo as a team, finishing 8th in the Eastern Conference and missing the playoffs.

He scored his first goal of the 2015 season on April 25 in a 4–4 draw with Sporting Kansas City. Bruin scored a brace on May 16 as Houston beat the Portland Timbers 3–1. On June 5, he scored twice and had an assist as the Dynamo beat the New York Red Bulls 4–2. Bruin scored 11 goals and had 4 assists from 33 appearances during the regular season as Houston finished 8th in the Western Conference, failing to qualify for the playoffs for the second straight season.

On March 6, 2016, in the opening match of the season, Bruin had an assist as the Dynamo drew 3–3 with New England. On March 12, He scored once in a 5–0 Dynamo win over FC Dallas. He ended the season with 4 goals and 3 assists from 31 appearances as the Dynamo finished last in the Western Conference and missed out on the playoffs for the third consecutive season. He only made one start over the final 3 months of the season as Mauro Manotas emerged as the starting striker. Following the 2016 season, Bruin requested a trade from Houston. Bruin ended his time in Houston with 57 goals, at the time the second most in team history.

=== Seattle Sounders FC ===
On December 23, 2016, Bruin was traded to the Seattle Sounders in exchange for undisclosed amounts of general and targeted allocation money. Bruin made his Sounders debut on March 4, 2017, coming on as a substitute in a 2–1 loss against his former team, the Houston Dynamo. He scored his first Sounders goal on March 11, an equalizer in the 94th minute of a 2–2 draw against the Montreal Impact. He scored a brace on October 15 to help the Sounders defeat FC Dallas 4–0. Bruin ended his first season in Seattle with 11 goals and 2 assists from 31 regular season appearances, helping the Sounders finish second in the Western Conference. After Bruin started both legs of a 2–0 aggregate win against Vancouver Whitecaps FC in the Conference semifinals, Seattle faced off with the Dynamo in the Conference final. He scored once in the first leg while scoring and picking up an assist in the second leg to help the Sounders beat his former team 5–0 on aggregate and advance to MLS Cup 2017. Bruin played the full 90 minutes in the final as Seattle lost to Toronto FC 2–0.

Bruin and the Sounders opened the 2018 season on February 22 with a 2–1 loss to Santa Tecla in the leg 1 of the CONCACAF Champions League round of 16. On March 1, Bruin scored once in a 4–0 in leg 2 to give Seattle a 5–2 aggregate win. Bruin appeared in both legs of the quarterfinals, but the Sounders lost to C.D. Guadalajara 3–1 on aggregate. On April 15, he picked up his first goal and assist of the MLS season to give Seattle a 2–2 draw with Sporting Kansas City. He scored twice on July 4 as the Sounders beat the Colorado Rapids 2–1. On August 4, Bruin scored in the 97th minute to give Seattle a 2–1 win over Minnesota United FC. He ended the regular season with 29 appearances, 7 goals, and 5 assists as the Sounders finished second in the Western Conference. In the playoffs, Bruin made a substitute appearance in leg 2 of the Conference semifinals matchup with the Portland Timbers. After playing to a 4–4 aggregate score, the Sounders lost on penalty kicks 4–2, with Bruin being one of two Sounders to miss their PK.

Bruin made his first appearance of the 2019 season on March 30, coming off the bench in a 0–0 draw against Vancouver. On April 1, Bruin played a game for Seattle's USL Championship affiliate, the Tacoma Defiance, scoring once and adding an assist in a 2–1 win over Sacramento Republic. On April 13, he scored twice as the Sounders defeated Toronto FC 2–0. On June 18, Bruin tore his ACL during practice, ruling him out for the rest of the season. In Bruin's absence, the Sounders went on to win MLS Cup 2019.

Bruin made his first appearance since tearing his ACL on July 27, coming off the bench and scoring in a 4–1 loss to LAFC in the round of 16 of the MLS is Back Tournament. On October 22, Bruin scored in the 93rd minute to give Seattle a 1–1 draw with Portland. In a shortened 2020 season due to the COVID-19 pandemic, Bruin made 15 appearances, scored 1 goal, and had 1 assist in MLS regular season play. After not featuring in the first 2 playoff games, Bruin sparked a comeback in the Conference final. Trailing 2–0 to Minnesota United, Bruin entered the game in the 73rd minute and scored in the 75th to make it 2–1. Raúl Ruidíaz scored in the 89th minute and Gustav Svensson scored in the 93rd minute to give Seattle a 3–2 win and advance to MLS Cup 2020. Bruin appeared off the bench in the final, but Seattle fell 3–0 to the Columbus Crew. At the end of the 2022 season, Bruin became a free agent after being released by the Sounders.

=== Austin FC ===
On February 10, 2023, Austin FC announced that they had signed Bruin to a one-year contract with an option for a second year after a successful trial with the team in their pre-season camp. Bruin made his first appearance for the team in their first CONCACAF Champions League match on March 7, coming on in the 70th minute of a 3–0 loss to Violette AC. On March 25, Bruin made his first league appearance for the team in a 1–1 draw against the Colorado Rapids, coming on in the 86th minute. He scored his first goal for the club on May 6 against the Portland Timbers in the 92nd minute, ensuring the team earned one point with a 2–2 draw. On November 17, Austin FC announced they would not exercise the 2024 option for Bruin.

On February 16, 2024, Bruin officially announced his retirement from professional soccer on social media.

== International career ==
Bruin made his debut for the United States men's national soccer team on January 29, 2013, coming on as a substitute in a 0–0 draw against Canada. On June 27, 2013, U.S. head coach Jürgen Klinsmann named Bruin to the 23-man squad for the 2013 CONCACAF Gold Cup. Bruin earned his second cap in a friendly before the tournament, coming off the bench in a 6–0 win over Guatemala on June 7. The United States would go on to win the Gold Cup, but Bruin did not appear in the tournament.

== Personal life ==
Bruin was born to Bill and Eva Bruin in St. Louis, Missouri. He grew up in Creve Coeur, Missouri, a suburb 15 miles west of St. Louis. At De Smet Jesuit High School, Bruin played on the school soccer team. He also played as a center fielder on the school baseball team as a freshman and played for four years as a shooting guard on the basketball team. Bruin attended Indiana University, where he played on the soccer team and was a fitness specialist major.

His wife, Caitlin, attended Indiana at the same time as Bruin and played on the school volleyball team. Together they have three children.

== Career statistics ==
=== Club ===
Appearances and goals by club, season and competition
Club	Season	League			Playoffs		U.S. Open Cup		CONCACAF CL		Other		Total	
Club	Season	Division	Apps	Goals	Apps	Goals	Apps	Goals	Apps	Goals	Apps	Goals	Apps	Goals
Houston Dynamo	2011	MLS	25	5	3	0	1	0	—		—		29	5
Houston Dynamo	2012	MLS	32	12	6	4	0	0	2	0	—		40	16
Houston Dynamo	2013	MLS	30	8	4	2	1	0	4	0	—		37	10
Houston Dynamo	2014	MLS	27	10	—		2	0	—		—		29	10
Houston Dynamo	2015	MLS	33	11	—		1	1	—		—		34	12
Houston Dynamo	2016	MLS	31	4	—		1	0	—		—		32	4
Houston Dynamo	Total		178	50	13	6	6	1	6	0	0	0	203	57
Seattle Sounders FC	2017	MLS	31	11	5	2	1	0	—		—		37	13
Seattle Sounders FC	2018	MLS	29	7	1	0	0	0	4	1	—		34	8
Seattle Sounders FC	2019	MLS	9	2	0	0	1	0	—		—		10	2
Seattle Sounders FC	2020	MLS	15	1	2	1	—		0	0	1 (Note: Appearance in MLS is Back Tournament knockout stage)	1	18	3
Seattle Sounders FC	2021	MLS	24	3	0	0	—		—		3 (Note: Appearances in Leagues Cup)	0	27	3
Seattle Sounders FC	2022	MLS	24	3	—		1	0	4	0	—		29	3
Seattle Sounders FC	Total		132	27	8	3	3	0	8	1	4	1	155	32
Tacoma Defiance (loan)	2019	USL	1	1	—		—		—		—		1	1
Austin FC	2023	MLS	19	3	—		0	0	2	0	2	0	23	3
Career total			330	81	21	9	9	1	16	1	6	1	382	93

=== International ===
Appearances and goals by national team and year
National team	Year	Apps	Goals
United States	2013	2	0
Total		2	0

== Honors ==
Seattle Sounders FC

- MLS Cup: 2019
- CONCACAF Champions League: 2022

United States

- CONCACAF Gold Cup: 2013

Individual

- Big Ten Freshman of the Year: 2008
- Big Ten Offensive Player of the Year: 2010
- Houston Dynamo Young Player of the Year: 2011, 2012
