= Giles Barnes =

Footballer (born 1988)

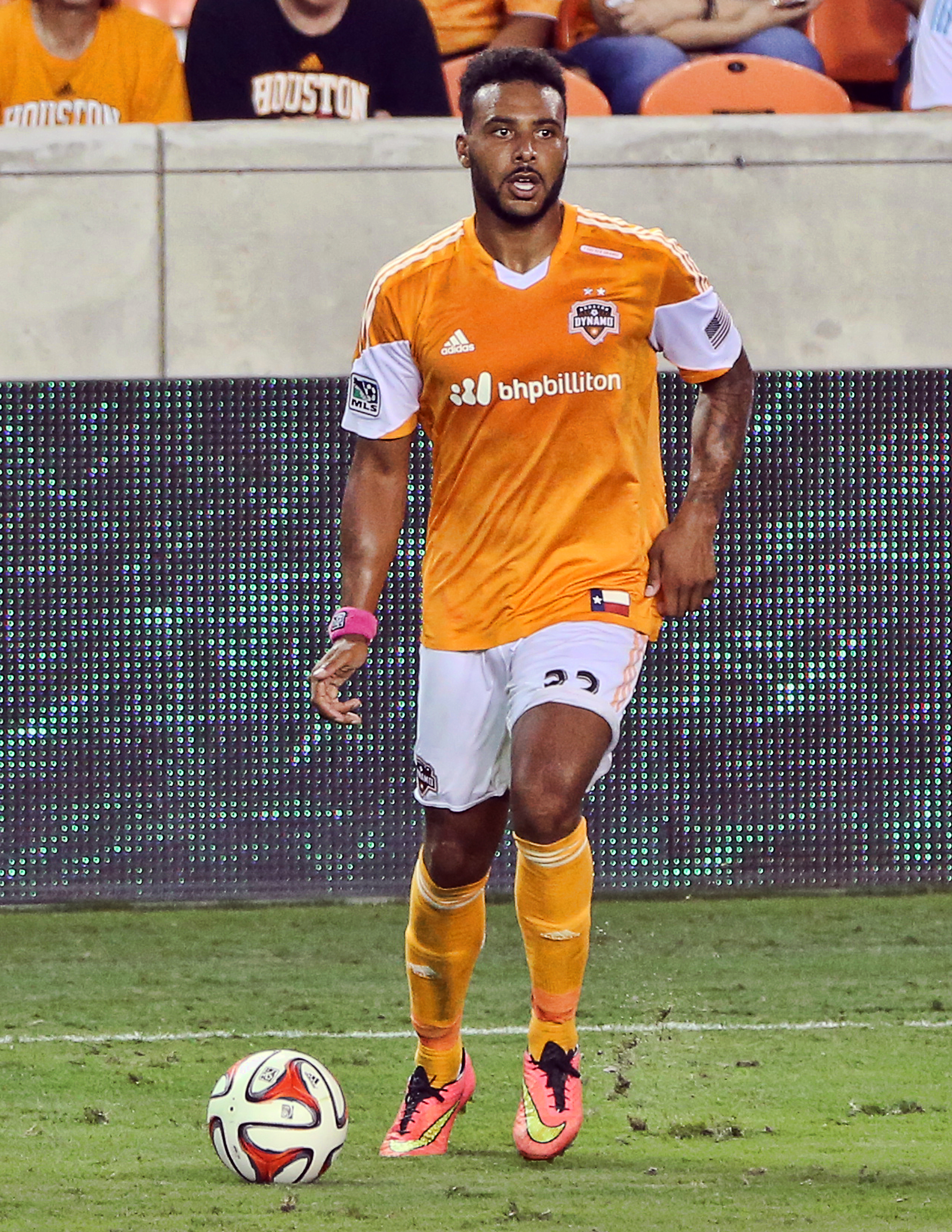
- Barnes playing for Houston Dynamo in 2014

Personal information
- Full name: Giles Gordon Kirlue Barnes
- Date of birth: 5 August 1988 (age 38)
- Place of birth: Barking, England
- Height: 6 ft 2 in (1.88 m)
- Positions: Forward; attacking midfielder

Youth career
- –2005: Derby County

Senior career*
Years	Team	Apps	(Gls)
2005–2009	Derby County	82	(10)
2009	→ Fulham (loan)	0	(0)
2010–2011	West Bromwich Albion	23	(0)
2011–2012	Doncaster Rovers	33	(1)
2012–2016	Houston Dynamo	113	(31)
2016–2017	Vancouver Whitecaps FC	10	(2)
2017	Orlando City	34	(3)
2018	León	3	(0)
2018	Colorado Rapids	12	(0)
2019–2020	Hyderabad	12	(0)
Total		322	(47)

International career
2006–2007	England U19	12	(7)
2015–2016	Jamaica	19	(3)

Managerial career
- 2022–2026: Orlando Pride (assistant)
- 2026–Present: Al Qadsiah FC (women)
Medal record
Men's football
Representing Jamaica
CONCACAF Gold Cup
Runner-up	2015 United States–Canada	Team
- * Club domestic league appearances and goals

Giles Gordon Kirlue Barnes (born 5 August 1988) is a former professional footballer who played as a forward and current head coach of Al Qadsiah FC (women). He began his career with Derby County, where he won the club's Young Player of the Year award in 2007 and was Championship Player of the Month in March 2007. Barnes represented England at under-19 level. He, however, opted to represent Jamaica at senior level, making his Reggae Boyz debut in March 2015 and representing them at the Copa América and CONCACAF Gold Cup later that year, helping them to the final of the latter event. Following the conclusion of his playing career, he spent time as an assistant head coach for the Orlando Pride of the National Women's Soccer League.

== Club career ==
=== Derby County ===
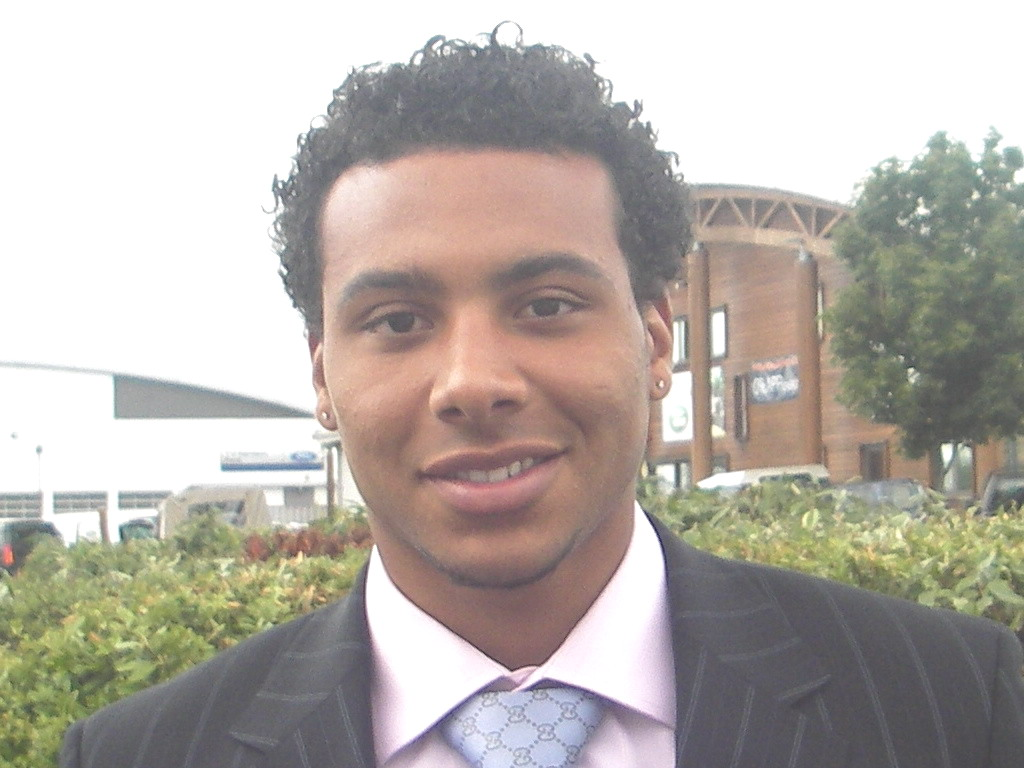
Barnes in 2006

Barnes was born in Barking, London. His professional career began on his 17th birthday when he signed a professional contract with Derby County after being a trainee. He made his first-team debut under Phil Brown aged 17 as an 84th-minute substitute for Paul Peschisolido in a 1–0 defeat at home to Grimsby Town in the 2005–06 League Cup, with his league debut coming in a 1–1 draw away to Crewe two weeks later as a 73rd minute replacement for Marcus Tudgay. Barnes intermittently made first-team appearances as Derby struggled but began to command a regular place when Phil Brown was replaced by Derby's academy manager Terry Westley in January 2006. Westley was familiar with Barnes from his time as a youngster at Derby and made him an integral part of the team as Derby managed to avoid relegation to League One. Barnes played a role in 16 matches under Westley, with his first start coming in Westley's first match in charge (a narrow 1–0 home defeat to Sheffield United) and his first professional goal coming in a 2–2 draw away to Watford.

His performances during the end of the 2005–06 season drew interest from the Premier League during the close season, but with the appointment of Billy Davies as manager and new investment, Barnes signed a four-year extension to his current contract. Barnes became a regular in the Derby team that won promotion to the Premier League, playing in 46 matches (with 34 of those starts) putting him behind only the club's player of the year Steve Howard in terms of appearances. He also scored eight goals, including four in two weeks with a 92nd-minute equaliser in a 2–2 draw away to Cardiff City, a brace in a 2–1 home win over Barnsley, and the winner in a 2–1 home win against West Bromwich Albion. During this time he gained a reputation for supposedly saying "Whoosh" as he ran past defenders. In a 2017 interview, he indicated this was a one-time response to aggression from an opponent, and has been taken out of context. His performances in March 2007 earned him the Championship Player of the Month award for that month. Although he picked up an injury towards the end of the season, Barnes was still able to make an impact in Derby's successful Championship play-off campaign in his two substitute appearances. It was his corner from which Leon Best scored an own goal in the second leg of the semi-final clash with Southampton and he also came off the bench to set up Stephen Pearson's winner in the 1–0 2007 Championship play-off final victory over West Brom. After this, it was found out that Barnes was playing with a broken foot and he missed all of the summer injured as Derby prepared for life back in the top flight. He was named Derby's Young Player of the Year for the 2006–07 season.

These injuries carried over into the start of Derby's disastrous 2007–08 season. He made his first Premier League appearance on 22 September 2007 as a substitute against Arsenal in the 75th minute and scored his first goal in a 2–2 draw against Newcastle United. The injuries that plagued Barnes through the course of his season, as well as no pre season and being put in the team two months earlier than was recommended, affected his form and he failed to play as vital a role in Derby's season as he had during 2006–07 and his season ended early when it was discovered he had a knee injury which required major surgery, meaning that he would miss the remainder of the 2007–08 season and the start of 2008–09.

Barnes returned to the Derby team in January 2009 and scored twice at Old Trafford in the League Cup semi-final second leg as Derby fell to a 4–2 defeat on the night, 4–3 on aggregate. After just three league appearances, on 31 January 2009, Barnes signed for Fulham on loan for the rest of the 2008–09 season with a view to a possible permanent transfer in the summer, with Derby receiving a substantial loan fee, and agreeing a fee of £2 million, raising to £4 million on appearances if he signed permanently. He did not make a single appearance for the Cottagers due to fitness, but scored seven in eight reserve matches. On 24 May, Roy Hodgson confirmed that Fulham would not be signing Barnes on a permanent basis and that he would return to Derby at the end of the season. Barnes returned to Derby but sustained another injury in a pre-season friendly against Stoke City after a two footed lunge by Carl Dickinson, and was eventually released from his Derby contract on 11 December 2009. After some weeks training with Premier League club Birmingham City, where his brother was playing at academy level, in mid-January 2010 Barnes moved on to train with West Bromwich Albion of the Championship.

=== West Bromwich Albion ===
On 3 February 2010, Barnes signed for West Bromwich Albion on an 18-month contract, with an option for a further one-year extension. He made his debut in the 1–0 win against Sheffield Wednesday on 9 March 2010, coming off the bench for the last 10 minutes of the match. On 25 May 2011 it was announced that Barnes was being released by West Brom. He had not played any matches for the club since the arrival of manager Roy Hodgson in January 2011. After being released by WBA, Barnes was linked with a move to Nottingham Forest with Steve McClaren wanting to sign the player.

=== Doncaster Rovers ===
On 4 August 2011, Barnes signed a six-month contract with Doncaster Rovers following a successful trial at the club. Barnes made his debut for the club as a substitute in the first match of the 2011–12 season against Brighton & Hove Albion. Barnes made a mixture of starts and substitute appearances at Rovers. On 6 January, Barnes signed a four-month extension keeping at Doncaster until 5 May 2012. On 25 February 2012 Barnes scored his first goal for Doncaster Rovers in a 1–1 draw against Peterborough United. In May 2012, Barnes was released by the club after the expiry of his contract.

=== Houston Dynamo ===
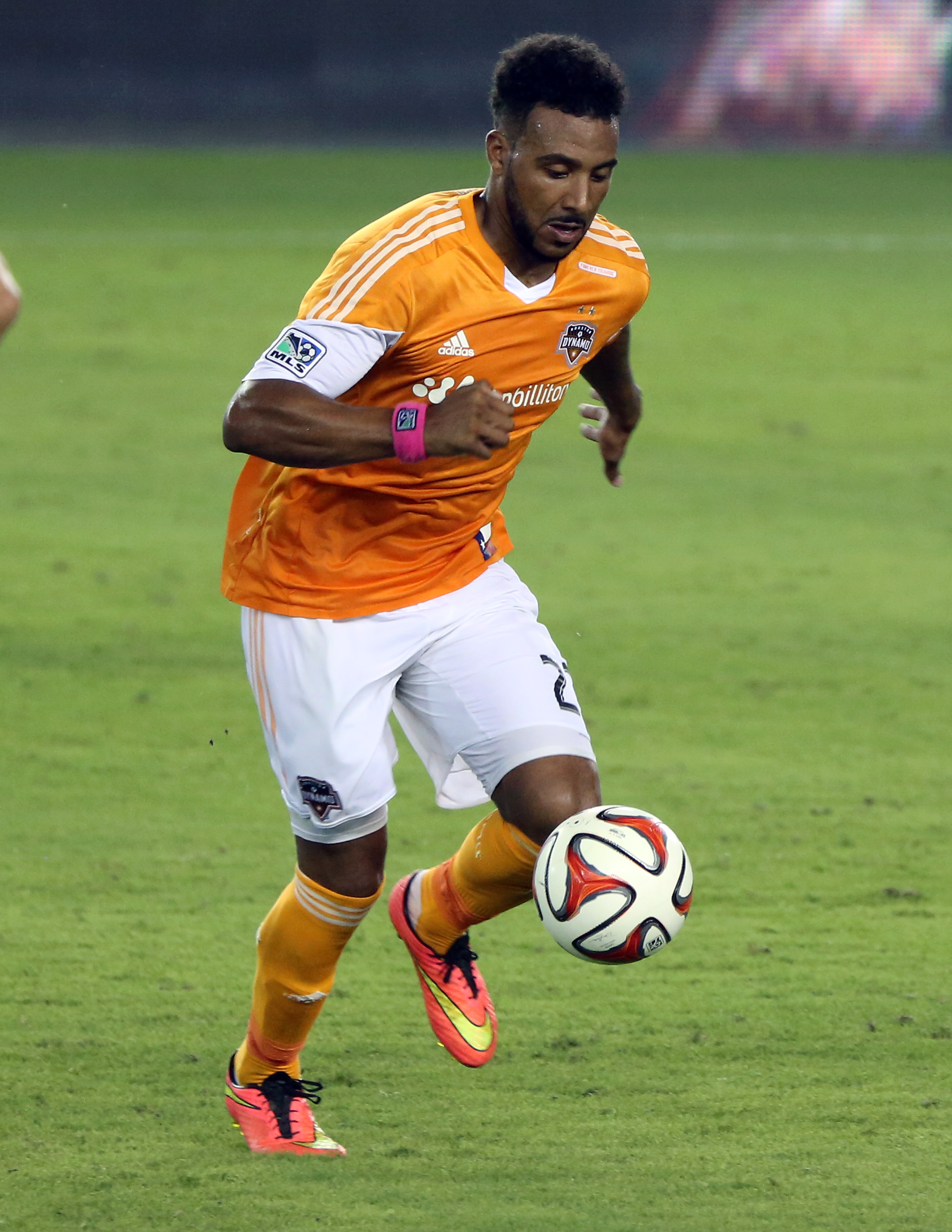
Barnes playing for Houston Dynamo in 2014

Barnes signed with Major League Soccer club Houston Dynamo on 29 August 2012. He scored his first goal with the club in the CONCACAF Champions League against CD FAS of El Salvador on 20 September 2012. Barnes scored his first MLS league goal on 23 March 2013 in Houston's 2–1 victory over Vancouver Whitecaps FC. On 21 September 2013, Barnes scored his first MLS brace against Chivas USA in a 5–1 victory for the Houston Dynamo.

On 4 March 2016, Barnes was appointed captain of the Houston Dynamo for the 2016 season.

=== Vancouver Whitecaps FC ===
Barnes was traded to Vancouver Whitecaps FC on 30 July 2016 in exchange for general allocation money and the MLS rights to Keyner Brown. The deal also dictated that Houston will receive a percentage of any future transfer fees if Barnes is loaned or transferred outside the league.

=== Orlando City SC ===
Barnes was traded to fellow MLS club Orlando City SC on 25 February 2017 in exchange for Brek Shea. He made his first appearance for Orlando against New York City FC on 5 March 2017, coming on as a substitute in the 11th minute after Kaká suffered a hamstring injury. Barnes became a designated player after Orlando waived Bryan Róchez on 17 March 2017. At the end of the 2017 season, Orlando opted to decline their contract option on Barnes.

=== Leon ===
Barnes signed with Mexican club León on 9 January 2018.

=== Colorado Rapids ===
On 13 July 2018, Barnes signed a six-month deal with MLS side Colorado Rapids. He was released by Colorado at the end of their 2018 season.

=== Hyderabad FC ===
In 2019, he signed for ISL side Hyderabad FC.

== International career ==
Barnes represented England at under-19 level in several friendly matches during 2006 and 2007. Barnes was also eligible to represent Jamaica internationally through his paternal grandparents and in March 2014, he announced his intention to represent Jamaica at senior international level. In February 2015, Barnes announced his FIFA paperwork had been submitted to play for Jamaica. He could be included in the squad as soon as late March.

Barnes was called up to Jamaica's squad for friendly matches against Venezuela and Cuba, scoring on his senior international debut against the former on 28 May 2015, the equaliser in a 2–1 win in Montego Bay. Later that day, he was included in Jamaica's 23-man squad for the 2015 Copa América held in Chile, and featured in all of their matches in a group-stage exit.

At the 2015 CONCACAF Gold Cup, Barnes scored his second international goal to defeat Haiti 1–0 at the quarter-final stage. He then went on to score the decisive goal in the 2–1 semi-final defeat of hosts the United States at the Georgia Dome, as Jamaica qualified for their first ever Gold Cup final, which they eventually lost to Mexico.

== Coaching career ==
On 15 February 2023, it was announced Barnes had been appointed assistant head coach to Seb Hines at National Women's Soccer League club Orlando Pride. He had been brought in during the previous season while Hines had assumed the role on an interim basis. In July 2026, Barnes departed from Orlando.

== Personal life ==
He is the older brother of the footballer Marcus Barnes. Barnes holds a U.S. green card which qualifies him as a domestic player for MLS roster purposes.

== Career statistics ==
=== Club ===
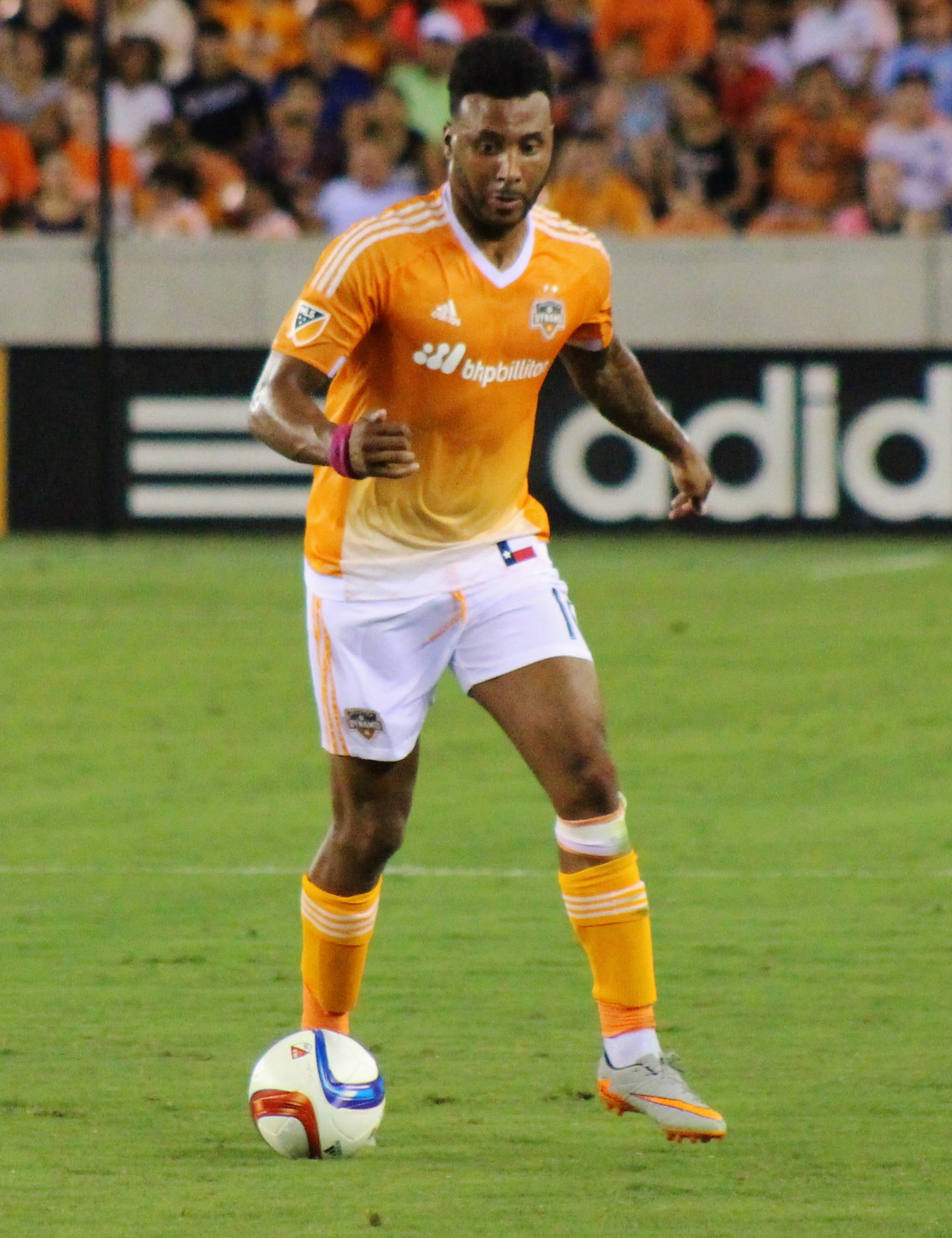
Barnes playing for Houston Dynamo in 2015

As of match played 9 June 2018

Appearances and goals by club, season and competition
Club	Season	League			National cup		League cup		Other		Total	
Club	Season	Division	Apps	Goals	Apps	Goals	Apps	Goals	Apps	Goals	Apps	Goals
Derby County	2005–06	Championship	19	1	0	0	1	0	—		20	1
Derby County	2006–07	Championship	39	8	3	0	2	0	2 (Note: Appearances in Championship play-offs)	0	46	8
Derby County	2007–08	Premier League	21	1	3	1	0	0	—		24	2
Derby County	2008–09	Championship	3	0	1	0	1	2	—		5	2
Derby County	2009–10	Championship	0	0	0	0	0	0	—		0	0
Derby County	Total		82	10	7	1	4	2	2	0	95	13
Fulham (loan)	2008–09	Premier League	0	0	0	0	0	0	—		0	0
West Bromwich Albion	2009–10	Championship	9	0	0	0	0	0	—		9	0
West Bromwich Albion	2010–11	Premier League	14	0	1	0	4	0	—		19	0
West Bromwich Albion	Total		23	0	1	0	4	0	—		28	0
Doncaster Rovers	2011–12	Championship	33	1	1	0	2	0	—		36	1
Houston Dynamo	2012	Major League Soccer	4	0	0	0	3 (Note: Appearances in MLS Cup Playoffs)	0	2 (Note: Appearances in Concacaf Champions League)	1	9	1
Houston Dynamo	2013	Major League Soccer	33	9	1	1	5	0	5	0	44	10
Houston Dynamo	2014	Major League Soccer	34	11	2	1	—		—		36	12
Houston Dynamo	2015	Major League Soccer	28	7	0	0	—		—		28	7
Houston Dynamo	2016	Major League Soccer	14	4	1	0	—		—		15	4
Houston Dynamo	Total		113	31	4	2	8	0	7	1	132	34
Vancouver Whitecaps FC	2016	Major League Soccer	10	2	0	0	—		0	0	10	2
Vancouver Whitecaps FC	2017	Major League Soccer	0	0	0	0	—		1	0	1	0
Vancouver Whitecaps FC	Total		10	2	0	0	—		1	0	11	2
Orlando City SC	2017	Major League Soccer	34	3	1	1	—		—		35	4
León	2017–18	Liga MX	0	0	3	0	—		—		3	0
Career total			295	47	17	4	18	2	10	1	340	54

=== International ===
As of match played 2 September 2016

Appearances and goals by national team and year
National team	Year	Apps	Goals
Jamaica	2015	14	3
Jamaica	2016	5	0
Total		19	3

As of match played 16 February 2017
Scores and results list Jamaica's goal tally first, score column indicates score after each Barnes goal.

List of international goals scored by Giles Barnes
No.	Date	Venue	Opponent	Score	Result	Competition
1	27 March 2015	Montego Bay Sports Complex, Montego Bay, Jamaica	Venezuela	1–1	2–1	Friendly
2	18 July 2015	M&T Bank Stadium, Baltimore, United States	Haiti	1–0	1–0	2015 CONCACAF Gold Cup
3	22 July 2015	Georgia Dome, Atlanta, United States	United States	2–0	2–1	2015 CONCACAF Gold Cup

== Honours ==
Derby County

- Football League Championship play-offs: 2007

Individual

- Derby County Young Player of the Year: 2006–07
- Football League Championship Player of the Month: March 2007
- Houston Dynamo Team MVP: 2014
- Houston Dynamo Players' Player of the Year: 2014
- Budweiser Golden Boot and Ironman of the Year awards: 2013, 2014
