= Jason Johnson (Jamaican footballer) =

Jamaican footballer (born 1990)

Personal information
- Date of birth: October 9, 1990 (age 36)
- Place of birth: Happy News, Jamaica
- Height: 1.83 m (6 ft 0 in)
- Position: Forward

College career
Years	Team	Apps	(Gls)
2010–2012	VCU Rams	60	(28)

Senior career*
Years	Team	Apps	(Gls)
2013–2015	Houston Dynamo	21	(1)
2014	→ Pittsburgh Riverhounds (loan)	12	(1)
2015	Chicago Fire	20	(2)
2016	San Antonio FC	27	(3)
2017–2019	Phoenix Rising	71	(23)
2020	Louisville City	6	(1)
2021	Austin Bold	8	(0)
2021	FC Tulsa	18	(3)
2022–2023	Monterey Bay	17	(0)

International career^{‡}
2011	Jamaica U23	2	(0)
2010–2013	Jamaica	3	(0)
- * Club domestic league appearances and goals as of October 21, 2023 ‡ National team caps and goals as of July 26, 2022

Jason Johnson (born October 9, 1990) is a Jamaican international footballer who currently plays as a forward.

== Career ==
=== College ===
After starting at Knox College and then Manchester High School in Mandeville, Jamaica, Johnson moved to the United States and enrolled at Virginia Commonwealth University in 2010 to play college soccer. In his first with the Rams, Johnson made 19 appearances and finished tied for second on the team with four goals and three assists. He was also named Third Team All-CAA and CAA All-Rookie Team honoree. In his sophomore year in 2011, Johnson made 20 appearances and finished with a team leading 11 goals and one assist on his way to being named NSCAA All-Region third team and All-CAA second team. In 2012, Johnson made 21 appearances and led his team in goals scored with 13 and second on the team in assists with six on his way to being named Atlantic 10's Offensive Player of the Year, First Team All-Atlantic 10 and NSCAA Mid-Atlantic All-Region Team.

=== Professional ===
==== Houston Dynamo ====
On January 3, 2013, Johnson signed a Generation Adidas contract with Major League Soccer, making him eligible for the 2013 MLS SuperDraft. A couple weeks later, Johnson was selected 13th overall in the draft by Houston Dynamo. On March 13, Johnson made his Dynamo debut, coming off the bench in a 3–0 loss to Santos Laguna in leg 2 of the 2012–13 CONCACAF Champions League quarterfinals. He made his MLS debut on May 8, coming on as a substitute in a 4–0 win over D.C. United. On September 8, Johnson scored his first goal for the Dynamo in a 4–1 loss to the New York Red Bulls. He ended his first season in Houston with 1 goal from 13 MLS regular season appearances. Johnson made one substitute appearance in the playoffs for the Dynamo, coming off the bench in a 2–1 loss to Sporting Kansas City in leg 2 of the Eastern Conference Finals. He also made 4 appearances and scored 1 goal in the group stage for the 2013–14 CCL.

During the 2014 season, Johnson made 8 substitute appearances for Houston in the MLS regular season as they failed to qualify for the playoffs. He also spent part of the season on loan to USL side Pittsburgh Riverhounds, where he made 12 appearances, scored 1 goal, and had 1 assist.

Although he started the 2015 season in Houston, Johnson did not play in any of Houston's first six games before being traded.

==== Chicago Fire ====
On April 13, 2015, Houston traded Johnson to the Chicago Fire for midfielder Alex. Johnson made his Fire debut on May 9, 2015, when he entered as an 84th minute sub in a 2–1 loss against visiting Real Salt Lake. He scored his first goal for Chicago on May 22, scoring in the 90+4th minute to give the Fire a 2–2 draw with the Columbus Crew. On July 11, Johnson scored 2 minutes into stoppage time to give Chicago a 1–1 victory against Seattle Sounders FC. He ended the season with 2 goals and 2 assists in 20 MLS regular season games for the Fire as Chicago finished 10th in the Eastern Conference, failing to qualify for the playoffs.

Following the 2015 season, Johnson had his contract option declined by Chicago.

==== San Antonio FC ====
On February 16, 2016, Johnson signed with USL side San Antonio FC. On April 3, Johnson scored twice in his San Antonio debut to help defeat Seattle Sounders FC 2 3–0. He made 27 appearances and scored 3 goals during the USL regular season as San Antonio finished 11th in the Western Conference, failing to qualify for the playoffs.

==== Phoenix Rising ====
On November 15, 2016, Johnson reunited with manager Frank Yallop, who was his coach in Chicago, at Phoenix Rising FC for the 2017 season. He made his debut for Phoenix on March 25 in a 1–0 loss to Toronto FC II. He scored his first goal for Phoenix on May 13 in a 2–1 win over OKC Energy. On July 15, Johnson scored twice to give Phoenix a 2–1 win over the Colorado Springs Switchbacks. On October 4, Johnson scored twice in a 4–3 victory against the Tulsa Roughnecks. He ended the regular season with 13 goals and 3 assists from 29 appearances as Phoenix finished 5th in the Western Conference. In the playoffs, Johnson and Phoenix lost on penalties to Swope Park Rangers in the first round.

Johnson scored his first 2 goals of the 2018 season on May 4 as Phoenix beat LA Galaxy II 4–3. He had another brace on June 13 in a 4–0 win over Las Vegas Lights FC. Johnson had 7 goals and 2 assists in 29 regular season games, helping Phoenix finish 3rd in the Western Conference. In the playoffs, he scored twice in 4 games as Phoenix reached the final, where they lost 1–0 to Louisville City.

Johnson scored his first goal of the 2019 season in Phoenix's opening match on March 9, scoring 3 minutes into stoppage time to draw 3–3 with San Antonio. In early May, it was announced that Johnson would be out for over 4 months due to an injury. He returned to the field on September 7, coming off the bench in a 1–0 win against San Antonio. Johnson ended the regular season with 12 appearances, 3 goals, and 1 assist, helping Phoenix 1st in the Western Conference and top of the overall regular season table. He appeared off the bench in both of Phoenix's playoff games.

==== Louisville City ====
Johnson signed with Louisville City on July 27, 2020. He made his debut for Louisville on August 8, coming on as a substitute in a 1–1 draw with Indy Eleven. he scored his first goal for Louisville on September 12 in a 3–0 win over Saint Louis FC. During a shortened regular season due to the COVID-19 pandemic, Johnson made 6 appearances and scored 1 goal. In the playoffs, Johnson made 2 substitute appearances and had 1 assist as Louisville reached the conference finals, where they lost 2–1 to the Tampa Bay Rowdies.

==== Austin Bold ====
On February 23, 2021, Johnson joined Austin Bold FC for the 2021 season.

==== FC Tulsa ====
On August 2, 2021, Johnson was transferred to USL Championship side FC Tulsa.

==== Monterey Bay ====
On July 1, 2022, Johnson signed with Monterey Bay as a free agent. Johnson earned his first start for Monterey Bay on July 30, 2022, during a 1–0 victory over Loudoun United FC. His contract option was declined by the club at the end of the season. After overcoming injuries and having a healthy preseason, Johnson was re-signed by Monterey Bay ahead of its 2023 season.

== International ==
Johnson made his international debut for Jamaica on February 10, 2010, in a 2–1 defeat to Argentina. He was also part of Jamaica's under-23 team in 2011 that failed to qualify for the 2012 CONCACAF Men's Olympic Qualifying Tournament. He returned to the national team in 2013 and played in two friendlies against Trinidad and Tobago.

== Career statistics ==
=== Club ===
As of January 29, 2021

Club	Season	League			Open Cup		Playoffs		Continental		Total	
Club	Season	Division	Apps	Goals	Apps	Goals	Apps	Goals	Apps	Goals	Apps	Goals
Houston Dynamo	2013	MLS	13	1	2	0	1	0	5 (Note: Appearances in CONCACAF Champions League)	1	21	2
Houston Dynamo	2014	MLS	8	0	2	0	—		—		10	0
Houston Dynamo	2015	MLS	0	0	0	0	—		—		0	0
Houston Dynamo	Dynamo Total		21	1	4	0	1	0	5	1	31	2
Pittsburgh Riverhounds (loan)	2014	USL Pro	12	1	0	0	—		—		12	1
Chicago Fire	2015	MLS	20	2	4	0	—		—		24	2
San Antonio FC	2016	USL	27	3	3	1	—		—		30	4
Phoenix Rising	2017	USL	29	13	2	0	1	0	—		32	13
Phoenix Rising	2018	USL	29	7	1	0	4	2	—		34	9
Phoenix Rising	2019	USLC	12	3	0	0	2	0	—		14	3
Phoenix Rising	Phoenix Total		70	23	3	0	7	2	0	0	80	25
Louisville City	2020	USLC	6	1	0	0	2	0	—		8	1
Career Total			156	31	14	1	10	2	5	1	185	35

=== International ===
National Team	Year	Apps	Goals
Jamaica	2010	1	0
Jamaica	2011	0	0
Jamaica	2012	0	0
Jamaica	2013	2	0
Total		3	0

== Honors ==
Phoenix Rising

- USL Championship Regular Season: 2019

== Personal ==
Johnson holds a U.S. green card which qualifies him as a domestic player for MLS roster purposes.
