= Michael Lisch =

American soccer player (born 1990)

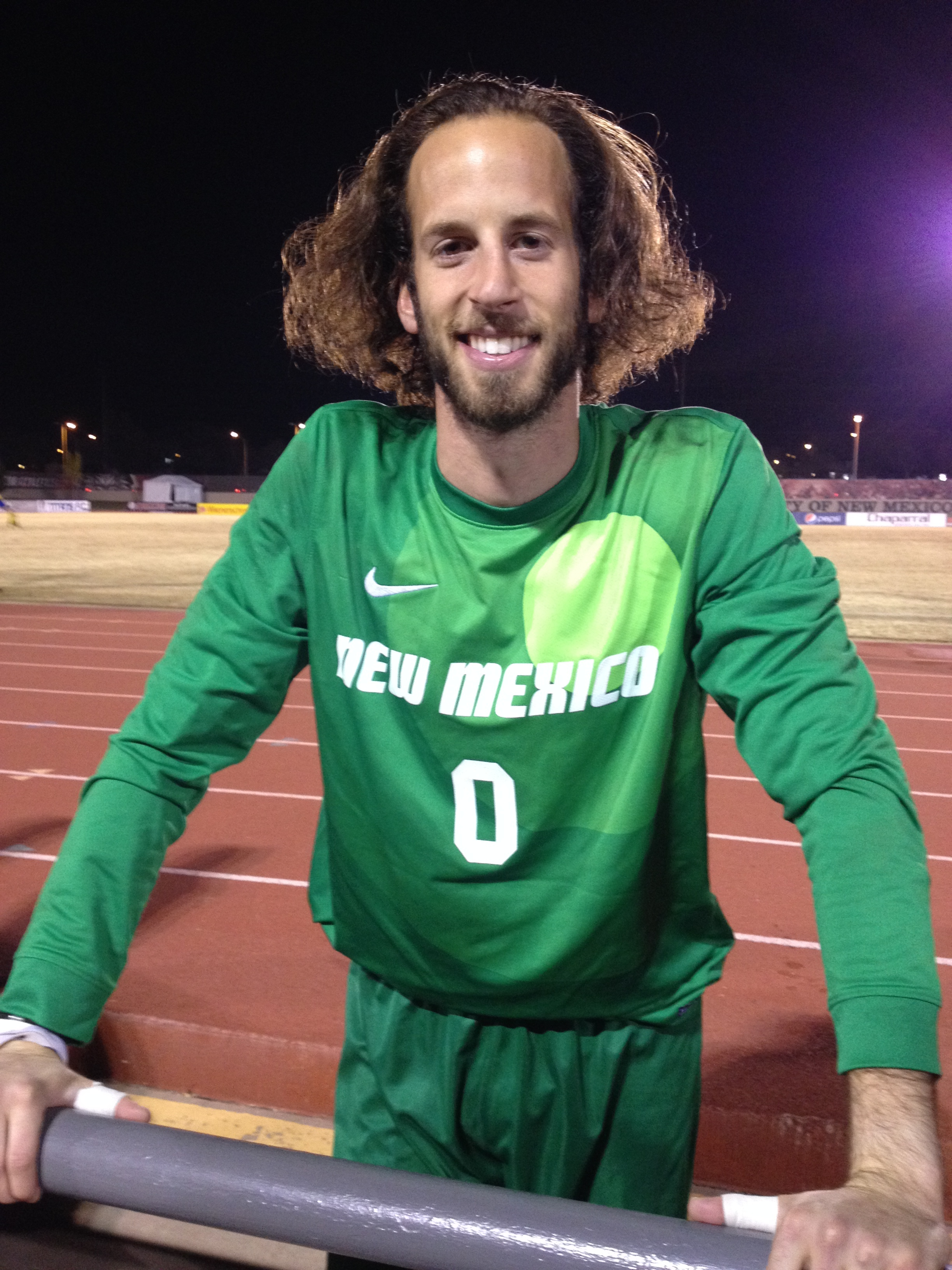

Personal information
- Full name: Michael David Lisch
- Date of birth: August 30, 1990 (age 36)
- Place of birth: Austin, Texas, United States
- Height: 6 ft 4 in (1.93 m)
- Position: Goalkeeper

Youth career
- 2000–2009: Lonestars FC
- 2009–2012: Wake Forest Demon Deacons
- 2013: New Mexico Lobos

Senior career*
Years	Team	Apps	(Gls)
2011	Bradenton Academics	5	(0)
2012	Austin Aztex	10	(0)
2014–2015	Houston Dynamo	0	(0)
2014	→ Pittsburgh Riverhounds (loan)	17	(0)
2015	→ Charleston Battery (loan)	1	(0)
2015	→ Charlotte Independence (loan)	2	(0)
- * Club domestic league appearances and goals as of August 19, 2015

Michael David Lisch (born August 30, 1990) is an American soccer player.

== Career ==
=== College ===
Lisch played college soccer at Wake Forest University between 2009 and 2012.

While at Wake Forest, Lisch also spent time playing for USL PDL club Austin Aztex.

After graduating in 2012, he transferred to the University of New Mexico where he played his final college season under coach Jeremy Fishbein.

Lisch led the 7th ranked Lobos to the 2013 NCAA Division I Men's Soccer Championship in Chester, Pennsylvania during his lone season at New Mexico.

=== Professional ===
Lisch was selected by Houston Dynamo with the 54th overall pick of the 2014 MLS SuperDraft.

Lisch made his professional debut on February 10, 2014, in a preseason friendly against FC Tucson.
