= Anthony Arena =

American soccer player (born 1990)

Personal information
- Date of birth: August 3, 1990 (age 36)
- Place of birth: Kenmore, Washington, United States
- Height: 5 ft 11 in (1.80 m)
- Position: Defender

Youth career
- 2000–2009: Crossfire Premier
- 2009–2012: Wake Forest Demon Deacons

Senior career*
Years	Team	Apps	(Gls)
2009–2011	Washington Crossfire	6	(0)
2012	Seattle Sounders FC U-23	10	(0)
2013–2014	Houston Dynamo	1	(0)
2014	→ Pittsburgh Riverhounds (loan)	16	(0)
2015	Pittsburgh Riverhounds	24	(2)

International career^{‡}
2008	United States U18	3	(1)
- * Club domestic league appearances and goals as of September 21, 2015 ‡ National team caps and goals as of June 1, 2013

Anthony Arena (born August 3, 1990) is an American soccer player.

== Career ==
=== Youth and college ===
Arena played college soccer at Wake Forest University between 2009 and 2012.

While at college, Arena also spent time playing for USL PDL club's Washington Crossfire and Seattle Sounders FC U-23.

=== Professional ===
Arena was selected by Houston Dynamo with the 18th overall pick of the 2013 MLS Supplemental Draft. Arena signed with Houston in March 2013. He made his professional debut with Houston on May 29, 2013, in a US Open Cup game against FC Tucson. In 2014, Arena was loaned to the Pittsburgh Riverhounds as part of an affiliation between the two clubs. In total, Arena made 16 appearances during the loan and was named the club's Defensive Player of the Season after making a late play-off push. After being released by the Dynamo following the 2014 MLS season, Arena returned to the Pittsburgh and signed for the Riverhounds for the 2015 USL season.

=== International ===
Arena has represented the United States at the U18 and U20 levels.
