= 2005 New England Revolution season =

New England Revolution
2005 season
- Owner: Robert Kraft (The Kraft Group)
- Head coach: Steve Nicol
- Stadium: Gillette Stadium; Foxborough, Massachusetts
- MLS: Conference: 1st Overall: 2nd
- MLS Cup Playoffs: Runner-up
- U.S. Open Cup: Round of 16
- Top goalscorer: Taylor Twellman (17)
- Average home league attendance: 12,525
- Biggest win: 4–1 (August 10 vs. Real Salt Lake)
- Biggest defeat: 2–0 (T3)
Home colors	Away colors

The 2005 New England Revolution season was the tenth season for the New England Revolution both as a club and in Major League Soccer (MLS). The club reached the playoffs after finishing first in the Eastern Conference (MLS). The club also reached the MLS Cup final, where they lost to the LA Galaxy. Additionally, they club participated in the U.S. Open Cup, where they were eliminated in the round of 16.

== Overview ==
The Revolution's 2005 season would go down as the team's best in history through their first ten years of MLS play. The team set a club-record for wins (17) and also points (59).

Despite the pre-season retirement of club legend Joe-Max Moore, the team stormed out of the gate, starting the season with an 11 game unbeaten run, at that point the longest in the club's history.

For the second year in a row, a Revolution player would win rookie of the year, with 5th-overall Superdraft selection Michael Parkhurst taking the honors.

Several other Revolution players would win awards as well in 2005. Netting 17 goals, Taylor Twellman won the league's first-ever golden boot. He additionally won MLS Player of the week 3 times, was named player of the month for September, and was named MLS Best XI alongside Clint Dempsey and Shalrie Joseph. Six Revolution players were named to the MLS all-star game, the highest number in the club's history: Clint Dempsey, Shalrie Joseph, Pat Noonan, Michael Parkhurst, Matt Reis, Taylor Twellman. Reis was additionally a finalist for goalkeeper of the year. Twellman was also named MLS all-star game MVP.

In August, the Revolution opened play in the 2005 U.S. Open Cup, entering the competition in the fourth round against Chicago Fire FC at Lusitano Stadium in Ludlow, Massachusetts. The Revolution would lose the match 3-2 after extra time. The match, described as "suspenseful," featured red cards issued to Jay Heaps and Jesse Marsch in extra time. August also featured the first-ever match-up between the Revolution and expansion side Real Salt Lake, a match the Revolution went on to win 4-1.

The Revolution finished the regular season atop the Eastern Conference and were thus drawn against the 4th-seeded MetroStars In Eastern Conference Semifinals of the 2005 MLS Cup Playoffs. The two-leg tie would go down as one of the greatest comebacks in MLS post-season history. After dropping the first match of the series 1-0, the Revolution would fall into a 59th-minute 0-2 aggregate hole in the home second leg, when Youri Djorkaeff scored on a break-away counter attack after Parkhurst misread a bounce on the snowy pitch. Behind goals from Jose Cancela and Pat Noonan in the 68th and 73rd minutes, the Revolution came back to tie the fixture on aggregate. They would ultimately win the match when substitute Khano Smith was able to win a foot race to a long-ball forward from Avery John, beat his defender, and curl a left-footed shot past MetroStars keeper Tony Meola.

On November 6, 2005, the Revolution faced off against Chicago Fire FC at Gillette Stadium in the Eastern Conference Finfal. It was the Revolution's fourth-consecutive Eastern Conference Championship in a row. In front of a crowd of 18,118, a 4th-minute goal from Clint Dempsey would prove enough to send the Revolution to their 2nd-ever appearance in the MLS Cup final. The match ended somewhat controversially, when an apparent stoppage time equalizer (90+2) from Gonzalo Segares was subsequently ruled offsides. The resulting protests to the match officials would see Andy Herron sent off, and a brawl between the teams erupted soon after the final whistle. The match served to kick off a rivalry between the two teams, as they would go on to meet in five consecutive MLS post seasons.

The 2005 season for the Revolution culminated in a matchup with the LA Galaxy in the 2005 MLS Cup on November 13, 2005 at Pizza Hut Park in Frisco, Texas. The game was a rematch of the 2002 MLS Cup final, however the Revolution entered the 2005 final as favorites. The Galaxy had the upper hand for most of the match, with the Revolution defense struggling to contend with the speed of Landon Donovan, who saw his shot cleared off the line by Parkhurst in the 79th minute. The match ultimately entered extra time, and, unfortunately for the Revolution, the game's only goal came from Guillermo Ramírez in minute 105 + 2, giving the Galaxy their second title.

== Squad ==
=== First team squad ===
The New England Revolution's active roster as of October 30, 2005.

Note: Flags indicate national team as defined under FIFA eligibility rules; some limited exceptions apply. Players may hold more than one non-FIFA nationality.

No.	Pos.	Nation	Player
7	MF	URU	José Cancela
25	MF	WAL	Andy Dorman
5	MF	BRA	Gilberto Flores
6	DF	USA	Jay Heaps
28	FW	USA	Jamie Holmes
21	MF	GRN	Shalrie Joseph
30	MF	USA	Ryan Latham
11	FW	USA	Pat Noonan
28	MF	PAN	Ricardo Phillips
1	GK	USA	Matt Reis
27	MF	BRA	Marcos Romaneiro
32	FW	BER	Khano Smith
20	FW	USA	Taylor Twellman
12	GK	USA	Doug Warren

No.	Pos.	Nation	Player
2	MF	USA	Clint Dempsey
17	MF	NGR	Connally Edozien
8	DF	USA	Joe Franchino
3	MF	USA	Daniel Hernandez
4	DF	TTO	Avery John
31	DF	USA	Jeff Larentowicz
22	MF	USA	Marshall Leonard
15	DF	USA	Michael Parkhurst
14	MF	USA	Steve Ralston
16	DF	USA	James Riley
26	GK	USA	Kyle Singer
34	GK	USA	T.J. Tomasso
23	MF	USA	Luke Vercollone
29	MF	USA	Easton Wilson

=== Transfers In ===
New England Revolution – 2005 Transfers In
Name	Nationality	Position	Date	Method	Fee	Prior Club	Reference
Michael Parkhurst	USA	DF	January 14, 2005	2005 MLS SuperDraft	N/A	Wake Forest Demon Deacons men's soccer	
James Riley	USA	DF	January 14, 2005	Superdraft	N/A	Wake Forest Demon Deacons men's soccer	
Tony Lochhead	NZL	DF	January 14, 2005	Superdraft	N/A	UC Santa Barbara	
Doug Warren	USA	GK	January 20, 2005	Trade	N/A	D.C. United	
Jamie Holmes	USA	FW	February 2, 2005	2005 MLS Supplemental Draft	N/A	Birmingham–Southern College	
Ryan Latham	USA	FW	February 2, 2005	Supplemental Draft	N/A	Southern Methodist University	
Easton Wilson	USA	MF	February 2, 2005	Supplemental Draft	N/A	UConn Huskies men's soccer	
Jeff Larentowicz	USA	DF	February 2, 2005	Supplemental Draft	N/A	Brown Bears men's soccer	
Cássio	BRA	MF	February 18, 2005	Undisclosed	N/A	Club Olimpia	
Connally Edozien	NGA	FW	March 30, 2005	Undisclosed	N/A	Cincinnati Excite	
Gilberto Flores	BRA	MF	July 9, 2005	Waiver Claim	N/A	MetroStars	
Daniel Hernandez	USA	MF	August 5, 2005	Undisclosed	N/A	Club Necaxa	
Ricardo Phillips	PAN	MF	September 9, 2005	Loan	N/A	Tauro F.C.	

=== Transfers Out ===
New England Revolution – 2005 Transfers Out
Name	Nationality	Position	Date	Method	Fee	Next Club	Reference
Joe-Max Moore	USA	FW	January 27, 2005	Retirement	N/A	N/A	
Félix Brillant	CAN	FW	June 28, 2005	Waived	N/A	Virginia Beach Mariners	
Cássio	BRA	MF	June 28, 2005	Waived	N/A	Ceará Sporting Club	
Kyle Singer	USA	GK	September 15, 2005	Waived	N/A	N/A	
Connally Edozien	NGA	FW	November 16, 2005	Waived	N/A	Rochester Raging Rhinos	
Gilberto Flores	BRA	MF	November 16, 2005	Waived	N/A	N/A	
Jamie Holmes	USA	FW	November 16, 2005	Waived	N/A	Wilmington Hammerheads FC	
Ricardo Phillips	PAN	MF	November 16, 2005	Waived	N/A	San Francisco F.C.	
Marcos Romaniero	BRA	MF	November 16, 2005	Waived	N/A	N/A	
Luke Vercollone	USA	MF	November 16, 2005	Waived	N/A	Charleston Battery	
Easton Wilson	USA	DF	November 16, 2005	Waived	N/A	N/A	

=== Squad Statistics ===
Adapted from FBref on May 12, 2024.

Player	Nationality	Position	Age	MP	Starts	Min	90s	Gls	Ast	G+A	G-PK	PK	PKatt	Yellow Cards	Red Cards	Gls	Ast	G+A	G-PK	G+A-PK
Michael Parkhurst	USA	DF	21	32	32	2,880	32	0	0	0	0	0	0	2	0	0	0	0	0	0
Jay Heaps	USA	DF, MF	28	31	31	2,790	31	1	4	5	1	0	0	7	0	0.03	0.13	0.16	0.03	0.16
Shalrie Joseph	GRN	DF, MF	26	31	31	2,788	31	6	5	11	4	2	2	8	0	0.19	0.16	0.36	0.13	0.29
Matt Reis	USA	GK	29	31	31	2,784	30.9	0	0	0	0	0	0	0	0	0	0	0	0	0
Clint Dempsey	USA	FW, MF	21	26	26	2,319	25.8	10	5	15	10	0	0	7	0	0.39	0.19	0.58	0.39	0.58
Taylor Twellman	USA	FW	24	25	25	2,226	24.7	17	3	20	17	0	0	1	0	0.69	0.12	0.81	0.69	0.81
Marshall Leonard	USA	DF	24	27	25	1,923	21.4	1	2	3	1	0	0	5	0	0.05	0.09	0.14	0.05	0.14
Joe Franchino	USA	DF, MF	28	24	23	2,011	22.3	0	2	2	0	0	0	2	0	0	0.09	0.09	0	0.09
José Cancela	URU	MF	28	25	22	1,643	18.3	2	2	4	2	0	0	0	0	0.11	0.11	0.22	0.11	0.22
Steve Ralston	USA	MF	30	21	21	1,857	20.6	1	3	4	1	0	0	1	0	0.05	0.15	0.19	0.05	0.19
Pat Noonan	USA	FW	24	21	21	1,843	20.5	8	5	13	8	0	0	4	0	0.39	0.24	0.63	0.39	0.63
Andy Dorman	WAL	MF	22	30	19	1,960	21.8	2	4	6	2	0	0	4	0	0.09	0.18	0.28	0.09	0.28
Avery John	TRI	DF	29	14	13	1,167	13	0	0	0	0	0	0	2	0	0	0	0	0	0
James Riley	USA	DF	22	23	12	1,294	14.4	1	3	4	1	0	0	3	0	0.07	0.21	0.28	0.07	0.28
Khano Smith	BER	FW, MF	23	23	8	928	10.3	3	1	4	3	0	0	4	0	0.29	0.1	0.39	0.29	0.39
Daniel Hernández	USA	DF, MF	28	7	7	557	6.2	0	0	0	0	0	0	2	1	0	0	0	0	0
Cássio Oliveira	BRA	DF, MF	25	3	2	112	1.2	0	0	0	0	0	0	0	0	0	0	0	0	0
Connally Edozien	USA	FW	26	9	1	220	2.4	0	0	0	0	0	0	1	0	0	0	0	0	0
Ryan Latham	USA	FW	22	6	1	157	1.7	0	0	0	0	0	0	0	0	0	0	0	0	0
Doug Warren	USA	GK	23	2	1	96	1.1	0	0	0	0	0	0	0	0	0	0	0	0	0
Luke Vercollone	USA	MF	22	3	0	38	0.4	0	0	0				0	0	0	0	0		
Ricardo Phillips	PAN	FW, MF	30	4	0	34	0.4	0	0	0	0	0	0	0	0	0	0	0	0	0
Jamie Holmes	USA	FW	21	1	0	20	0.2	0	0	0	0	0	0	0	0	0	0	0	0	0
Jeff Larentowicz	USA	DF, MF	21	1	0	1	0	0	0	0	0	0	0	0	0	0	0	0	0	0

=== Annual Leaders ===
Adapted from 2024 Media Guide (pgs. 326–330)

New England Revolution – 2005 Statistical Leaders
Category	Name	Figure
Games played	Michael Parkhurst	32
Games Started	Michael Parkhurst	32
Goals	Taylor Twellman	17
Assists	Clint Dempsey	9
Minutes played	Michael Parkhusrt	2,880
Shots	Taylor Twellman	82
Shots on Target	Taylor Twellman	51
Fouls Committed	Shalrie Joseph	51
Fouls Suffered	Clint Dempsey	71
Cautions	Shalrie Joseph	8

== Coaches, Management, and Staff ==
New England Revolution – 2005 Coaches and Staff
Title	Name	Nationality	Reference
Investor / Operator	Robert Kraft	(United States)	
Investor / Operator	Jonathan Kraft	(United States)	
Director of Soccer	Mike Burns	(United States)	
General Manager	Craig Tornberg	(United States)	
President, Kraft Soccer	Sunil Gulati	(United States)	
Vice President and Chief Operating Officer	Lou Imbriano	(United States)	
Head Coach	Steve Nicol	(Scotland)	
Assistant Coach	Paul Mariner	(England)	
Assistant Coach	David Vanole	(United States)	

== Standings ==
=== Eastern Conference ===
Pos	Team	Pld	W	L	T	GF	GA	GD	Pts	Qualification
1	New England Revolution	32	17	7	8	55	37	+18	59	MLS Cup Playoffs
2	D.C. United	32	16	10	6	58	37	+21	54	MLS Cup Playoffs
3	Chicago Fire	32	15	13	4	49	50	−1	49	MLS Cup Playoffs
4	MetroStars	32	12	9	11	53	49	+4	47	MLS Cup Playoffs
5	Kansas City Wizards	32	11	9	12	52	44	+8	45	
6	Columbus Crew	32	11	16	5	34	45	−11	38	

Source: MLS

=== Overall standings ===
Pos	Team	Pld	W	L	T	GF	GA	GD	Pts	Qualification
1	San Jose Earthquakes (S)	32	18	4	10	53	31	+22	64	
2	New England Revolution	32	17	7	8	55	37	+18	59	CONCACAF Champions' Cup
3	D.C. United	32	16	10	6	58	37	+21	54	
4	Chicago Fire	32	15	13	4	49	50	−1	49	
5	Dallas Burn	32	13	10	9	52	44	+8	48	
6	MetroStars	32	12	9	11	53	49	+4	47	
7	Colorado Rapids	32	13	13	6	40	37	+3	45	
8	Los Angeles Galaxy (C)	32	13	13	6	44	45	−1	45	CONCACAF Champions' Cup
9	Kansas City Wizards	32	11	9	12	52	44	+8	45	
10	Columbus Crew	32	11	16	5	34	45	−11	38	
11	Real Salt Lake	32	5	22	5	30	65	−35	20	
12	Chivas USA	32	4	22	6	31	67	−36	18	

Source: MLS
Rules for classification: 1) points; 2) head-to-head record; 3) goal difference; 4) number of goals scored
(C) Champions; (S) Supporters' Shield

== Results ==
=== Regular season ===
Attendances are adapted from 2024 New England Revolution Media Guide (pgs. 263–264)

April 2, 2005 1	San Jose Earthquakes	2–2	New England Revolution	San Jose, California
	Brian Ching 13'; Ronald Cerritos 21'; Brian Mullan (yellow card) 44'; Ricardo Clark (yellow card) 35'; Eddie Robinson (red card) 70'	Report	Shalrie Joseph (yellow card) 15'; Matt Reis (yellow card) 20'; Pat Noonan 52'; Marshall Leonard (yellow card) 64'; Jay Heaps (yellow card) 66'; Taylor Twellman 73'	Stadium: Spartan Stadium; Attendance: 8,730; Referee: Baldomero Toledo

April 9, 2005 2	New England Revolution	3–0	Columbus Crew	Foxborough, Massachusetts
	Clint Dempsey 64'; James Riley (yellow card) 80'; Pat Noonan 82'; Andy Dorman 85'	Report	Simon Elliott (yellow card) 45'; Danny Szetela (yellow card) 57'; Manny Lagos (yellow card) 61'	Stadium: Gillette Stadium; Attendance: 9,727; Referee: Terry Vaughn

April 23, 2005 3	D.C. United	3–4	New England Revolution	Washington, D.C.
	Brian Carroll (yellow card) 24'; Santino Quaranta 57'; Ben Olsen (yellow card) 79'; Jaime Moreno 45+5' 82'	Report		Stadium: RFK Stadium; Attendance: 13,691: Taylor Twellman 26'; Shalrie Joseph 28'; Marshall Leonard 31'; James Riley (yellow card) 34'; Pat Noonan (yellow card) 45+5'; Clint Dempsey 77' (yellow card) 86' Referee: Mark Geiger

April 27, 2005 4	Chicago Fire FC	0-3	New England Revolution	Chicago, Illinois
18:00	Samuel Caballero (yellow card) 14'; Jesse Marsch (yellow card) 28'; C. J. Brown (yellow card) 72'	Report	Clint Dempsey 32'; Pat Noonan 43'; Jay Heaps (yellow card) 48'; Shalrie Joseph (yellow card) 70'; Taylor Twellman 90+5'	Stadium: Soldier Field; Attendance: 54,427; Referee: Abbey Okulaja

April 30, 2005 5	New England Revolution	1–0	Chivas USA	Foxborough, Massachusetts
	Clint Dempsey 88'	Report	Héctor Cuadros (yellow card) 61'; Matt Taylor (yellow card) 72'; Ryan Suarez (yellow card) 78'; Thiago Martins (yellow card) 73'; Isaac Romo (yellow card) 83'	Stadium: Gillette Stadium; Attendance: 7,813; Referee: Kevin Terry

May 7, 2005 6	New England Revolution	2–0	Chicago Fire FC	Foxborough, Massachusetts
	Pat Noonan 34'; Clint Dempsey 58'	Report	Jesse Marsch (yellow card) 82'	Stadium: Gillette Stadium; Attendance: 8,003; Referee: Brian Hall

May 14, 2005 7	New England Revolution	1–0	D.C. United	Foxborough, Massachusetts
	Taylor Twellman 59'; Andy Dorman (yellow card) 76'	Report	Mike Petke (yellow card) 73'	Stadium: Gillette Stadium; Attendance: 13,662; Referee: Michael Kennedy

May 21, 2005 8	MetroStars	2–2	New England Revolution	Foxborough, Massachusetts
	Eddie Gaven 16'; Abdoul Aziz Ibrahim (yellow card) 41' (red card) 66'; John Wolyniec 83'	Report	Taylor Twellman 6' 89'; Jay Heaps (yellow card) 25'; Avery John (yellow card) 59'; Shalrie Joseph (yellow card) 63'	Stadium: Gillette Stadium; Attendance: 12,134; Referee: Baldomero Toledo

May 28, 2005 9	New England Revolution	0–0	Colorado Rapids	Foxborough, Massachusetts
	Avery John (yellow card) 76'	Report	Mike Petke (yellow card) 13'; Guy Melamed (yellow card) 19' (red card) 79'	Stadium: Gillette Stadium; Attendance: 12,317; Referee: Ben Jones

June 4, 2005 10	New England Revolution	1–1	Kansas City Wizards	Foxborough, Massachusetts
	Khano Smith 17'; Marshall Leonard (yellow card) 77'	Report	Shavar Thomas (yellow card) 45+2'; Jimmy Conrad (yellow card) 48'; Sasha Victorine 51'	Stadium: Gillette Stadium; Attendance: 13,342; Referee: Alex Prus

June 11, 2005 11	Kansas City Wizards	0-2	New England Revolution	Kansas City, Missouri
	Nick Garcia (yellow card) 84'	Report	Sasha Victorine 8' (o.g.); Pat Noonan 49'; Khano Smith (yellow card) 63'	Stadium: Arrowhead Stadium; Attendance: 6,787; Referee: Kevin Stott

June 18, 2005 12	D.C. United	0–2	New England Revolution	Washington, D.C.
	Santino Quaranta 10'; Jaime Moreno 12'; Nick Rimando (yellow card) 49'; Joshua Gros (yellow card) 50'	Report	Shalrie Joseph (yellow card) 75'	Stadium: RFK Stadium; Attendance: 17,611; Referee: Brian Hall

June 22, 2005 13	Columbus Crew	1–3	New England Revolution	Columbus, Ohio
	Edson Buddle 4'; Chris Wingert (yellow card) 9'	Report	Clint Dempsey (yellow card) 9' (goal) 45+2'; Pat Noonan 24' 68'; Jay Heaps (yellow card) 27'; Marshall Leonard (yellow card) 56'; Khano Smith (yellow card) 72'	Stadium: Columbus Crew Stadium; Attendance: 10,799; Referee: Kevin Terry

June 25, 2005 14	New England Revolution	4–2	MetroStars	Foxborough, Massachusetts
	Jose Cancela 1'; Jay Heaps 72'; Steve Ralston 86'; Pat Noonan 90+1'		Chris Leitch 4 (yellow card) 4'; Amado Guevara 26 (yellow card) 26'; Youri Djorkaeff 67' (pen.); Sergio Galván Rey 68'; Seth Stammler (yellow card) 90+3'	Stadium: Gillette Stadium; Attendance: 17,194; Referee: Ricardo Salazar

July 4, 2005 15	LA Galaxy	1–1	New England Revolution	Carson, California
	Paulo Nagamura (yellow card) 86'; Michael Enfield 87'; Naldo (yellow card) 90+5'	Report	Shalrie Joseph (yellow card) 81'; Andy Dorman 90+4'	Stadium: Home Depot Center; Attendance: 27,000; Referee: Michael Kennedy

July 9, 2005 16	Chicago Fire FC	1-0	New England Revolution	Chicago, Illinois
	Gonzalo Segares 58'	Report	Matt Reis (yellow card) 62'	Stadium: Soldier Field; Attendance: 12,077; Referee: Jair Marrufo

July 16, 2005 17	New England Revolution	3–2	FC Dallas	Foxborough, Massachusetts
	Marshall Leonard (yellow card) 20'; Taylor Twellman 44' 90' 90+2'; Michael Parkhurst (yellow card) 70'	Report	Arturo Álvarez 7'; Simo Valakari (yellow card) 35'; Ronnie O'Brien 45+1'; Aaron Pitchkolan (yellow card) 53'	Stadium: Gillette Stadium; Attendance: 22,108; Referee: Abbey Okulaja

July 22, 2005 18	Chivas USA	0–1	New England Revolution	Carson, California
19:30	Douglas Sequeira 38'	Report	Jay Heaps (yellow card) 81'; Joe Franchino (yellow card) 87'; Andy Dorman (yellow card) 90+1'	Stadium: Home Depot Center; Attendance: 10,681; Referee: Alex Prus

July 27, 2005 19	New England Revolution	1–1	LA Galaxy	Foxborough, Massachusetts
	Jay Heaps (yellow card) 21'; Shalrie Joseph 26' (pen.); Clint Dempsey (yellow card) 82'; James Riley (yellow card) 87'	Report	Herculez Gomez 16'; Landon Donovan (yellow card) 69'; Peter Vagenas (yellow card) 90'	Stadium: Gillette Stadium; Attendance: 8,954; Referee: Marcel Yonan

August 6, 2005 20	New England Revolution	1–2	Kansas City Wizards	Foxborough, Massachusetts
	Shalrie Joseph 48'; Clint Dempsey (yellow card) 87'	Report	Kerry Zavagnin (yellow card) 41'; Chris Klein 47'; Scott Sealy 73'; Jose Burciaga Jr. (yellow card) 88'; Jack Jewsbury (yellow card) 90+2'	Stadium: Gillette Stadium; Attendance: 10,204; Referee: Ben Jones

August 10, 2005 21	New England Revolution	4–1	Real Salt Lake	Foxborough, Massachusetts
	Clint Dempsey 12'; Taylor Twellman 16'; Brian Dunseth 76' (o.g.); Khano Smith 90'	Report	Jason Kreis 31'; Seth Trembly (yellow card) 53'	Stadium: Gillette Stadium; Attendance: 8,066; Referee: Ricardo Valenzuela

August 13, 2005 22	FC Dallas	1–2	New England Revolution	Frisco, Texas
	Ronnie O'Brien (yellow card) 31'; Simo Valakari (yellow card) 39'; Carlos Ruiz 58'	Report	Clint Dempsey 33'; Taylor Twellman (yellow card) 61'; Shalrie Joseph 80'; Khano Smith (yellow card) 90'	Stadium: Pizza Hut Park; Attendance: 12,101; Referee: Baldomero Toledo

August 17, 2005 23	Colorado Rapids	2–0	New England Revolution	Denver, Colorado
	Alain N'Kong (yellow card) 32' (goal) 78'; Peguero Jean Philippe 86'	Report	Clint Dempsey (yellow card) 38'; Shalrie Joseph (yellow card) 74'; Matt Reis (red card) 83'	Stadium: INVESCO Field at Mile High; Attendance: . 6,881; Referee: Alex Prus

August 27, 2005 24	New England Revolution	2–1	D.C. United	Foxborough, Massachusetts
	Pat Noonan (yellow card) 27'; Bobby Boswell 48' (o.g.); Jay Heaps (yellow card) 60'; Andy Dorman (yellow card) 79'; Daniel Hernandez (yellow card) 80'; Taylor Twellman 90+4'	Report	Santino Quaranta 36'; Ben Olsen (yellow card) 85'; Facundo Erpen (yellow card) 88'; Demo Kovalenko (red card) 90+1'	Stadium: Gillette Stadium; Attendance: 18,049; Referee: Michael Kennedy

September 3, 2005 25	Real Salt Lake	0–1	New England Revolution	Salt Lake City, Utah
	Jason Kreis (yellow card) 23'; Brian Dunseth (yellow card) 44'; Clint Mathis (yellow card) 70'; Paul Broome (yellow card) 80'; Andy Williams (red card) 90+1'	Report	Clint Dempsey (yellow card) 30'; Marshall Leonard (yellow card) 59'; Khano Smith 76'	Stadium: Rice–Eccles Stadium; Attendance: 17,876; Referee: Ramon Hernandez

September 10, 2005 26	New England Revolution	3–1	Columbus Crew	Foxborough, Massachusetts
	Taylor Twellman 6' 39' 63'; Shalrie Joseph (yellow card) 9'	Report	Robin Fraser (yellow card) 41'; Frankie Hejduk 63'; Simon Elliot (yellow card) 77'	Stadium: Gillette Stadium; Attendance: 9,167; Referee: Abbey Okulaja

September 17, 2005 27	MetroStars	5–4	New England Revolution	East Rutherford, New Jersey
	Mike Magee 7' 76'; Carlos Mendes (yellow card) 48'; Youri Djorkaeff 51' (yellow card) 63' (goal) 86'; Amado Guevara 59'; Jeff Agoos (yellow card) 62'; Tim Ward (yellow card) 90'	Report	Shalrie Joseph 29' 61'; Joe Franchino (yellow card) 44'; Clint Dempsey 71'; Taylor Twellman 74'; Pat Noonan (yellow card) 90'	Stadium: Giants Stadium; Attendance: 17,031; Referee: Mark Geiger

September 21, 2005 28	Columbus Crew	1–1	New England Revolution	Columbus, Ohio
	Knox Cameron 66'; Mark Rodriguez (yellow card) 72'	Report	Taylor Twellman 90+3'	Stadium: Columbus Crew Stadium; Attendance: 11,769; Referee: Richard Heron

September 24, 2005 29	New England Revolution	1–0	MetroStars	Foxborough, Massachusetts
	Clint Dempsey (yellow card) 29'; Daniel Hernandez (yellow card) 83'; James Riley 85'; Pat Noonan (yellow card) 70'	Report	Amado Guevara (yellow card) 17'	Stadium: Gillette Stadium; Attendance: 15,663; Referee: Brian Hall

October 1, 2005 30	New England Revolution	0–2	San Jose Earthquakes	Foxborough, Massachusetts
	Shalrie Joseph (yellow card) 51'; Daniel Hernandez (red card) 61'	Report	Dwayne De Rosario (yellow card) 15' (goal) 80'; Alejandro Moreno (yellow card) 33'; Brian Ching 60'; Ryan Cochrane (yellow card) 75'	Stadium: Gillette Stadium; Attendance: 14,316; Referee: Ricardo Salazar

October 8, 2005 31	Kansas City Wizards	2–2	New England Revolution	Kansas City, Missouri
	Josh Wolff 28'; Jimmy Conrad 39'	Report	Andy Dorman (yellow card) 38'; Clint Dempsey 58'; José Cancela 41'; Connally Edozien (yellow card) 77'	Stadium: Arrowhead Stadium; Attendance: 12,546; Referee: Michael Kennedy

October 15, 2005 32	New England Revolution	1–0	Chicago Fire FC	Foxborough, Massachusetts
	Steve Ralston (yellow card) 3'; Taylor Twellman 35'; Khano Smith (yellow card) 90+2'	Report	Jack Stewart (yellow card) 15'; Thiago (yellow card) 84'	Stadium: Gillette Stadium; Attendance: 11,812; Referee: Abbey Okulaja

=== MLS Cup Playoffs ===
October 22, 2005 Conference Semifinal Leg 1	MetroStars	1-0	New England Revolution	East Rutherford, New Jersey
19:00	Amado Guevara 34'; Seth Stammler (yellow card) 41'; Youri Djorkaeff (yellow card) 74'	Report	Shalrie Joseph (yellow card) 43'	Stadium: Giants Stadium; Attendance: 10,003; Referee: Ricardo Valenzuela

October 28, 2005 Conference Semifinal Leg 2	New England Revolution	3–1	MetroStars	Foxborough, Massachusetts
	Daniel Hernandez (yellow card) 31'; José Cancela 68'; Pat Noonan 73'; Khano Smith 83'	Report	Youri Djorkaeff 59'	Stadium: Gillette Stadium; Attendance: 9,581; Referee: Brian Hall

November 6, 2005 Conference Final	New England Revolution	1–0	Chicago Fire FC	Foxborough, Massachusetts
15:00	Clint Dempsey 4'	Report	Gonzalo Segares (yellow card) 83'; Jesse Marsch (yellow card) 80'; Samuel Caballero (yellow card) 89'; Nate Jaqua (yellow card) 27'; Chad Barrett (yellow card) 73'; Andy Herron (red card) 90+2'	Stadium: Gillette Stadium; Attendance: 18,118; Referee: Terry Vaughn

November 13, 2005 Championship	New England Revolution	0–1 (a.e.t.)	LA Galaxy	Frisco, Texas
14:30	Daniel Hernández (yellow card) 15'; Joe Franchino (yellow card) 22'; Shalrie Joseph (yellow card) 37'; James Riley (yellow card) 54'; Jay Heaps (yellow card) 76'	Report	Todd Dunivant (yellow card) 33'; Paulo Nagamura (yellow card) 56'; Tyrone Marshall (yellow card) 69'; Herculez Gomez (yellow card) 78'; Chris Albright (yellow card) 81'; Guillermo Ramírez 105+2'	Stadium: Pizza Hut Park; Attendance: 21,193; Referee: Kevin Stott

=== 2005 U.S. Open Cup ===
August 3, 2005 4th Round	New England Revolution	2–3	Chicago Fire	Ludlow, Massachusetts
18:30	Shalrie Joseph 22'; Jay Heaps (yellow card) 27'; Ryan Latham (yellow card) 30'; Khano Smith (yellow card) 71'; Jay Heaps (yellow card) 108' (red card) 108'; Andy Dorman 120'	Report	Andy Herron 18' 99'; Jesse Marsch (yellow card) 59' (red card) 102'; Samuel Caballero (yellow card) 74'; C. J. Brown 96'	Stadium: Lusitano Stadium; Attendance: 3,000

== Honors ==
=== League Awards and Honors ===
New England Revolution – 2005 League Awards
Award	Name(s)
Most Valuable Player	Taylor Twellman (winner)
MLS Golden Boot	Taylor Twellman (17g, 7a)
MLS Goalkeeper of the Year	Matt Reis (finalist)
MLS Coach of the Year	Steve Nicol (Finalist)
MLS Rookie of the Year	Michael Parkhurst
MLS "Best XI" Selections	Clint Dempsey, Shalrie Joseph, Taylor Twellman
MLS Player of the Month	Clint Dempsey (April), Taylor Twellman (September)
MLS Player of the Week	Clint Dempsey (Week 4), Pat Noonan (Week 13), Taylor Twellman (Week 16, Week 22, Week 24)
MLS Allstar Selections	Clint Dempsey, Shalrie Joseph, Pat Noonan, Michael Parkhurst, Matt Reis, Taylor Twellman
MLS Allstar Game MVP	Taylor Twellman
MLS Goal of the Week	Clint Dempsey (Week 5 vs. CHI), Taylor Twellman (Week 1 vs. SJ), Taylor Twellman (Week 24 vs. CLB)
MLS Goal of the Year	2005 Clint Dempsey (Finalist)

=== Club Awards and Honors ===
New England Revolution – 2005 Team Awards
Award	Name(s)
Revolution Most Valuable Player	Shalrie Joseph
Revolution Defender of the Year	Michael Parkhurst
Revolution Humanitarian of the Year	Matt Reis
Revolution Golden Boot	Taylor Twellman (16g, 7a)
