= List of New England Revolution players =

List of all players for the New England Revolution soccer team

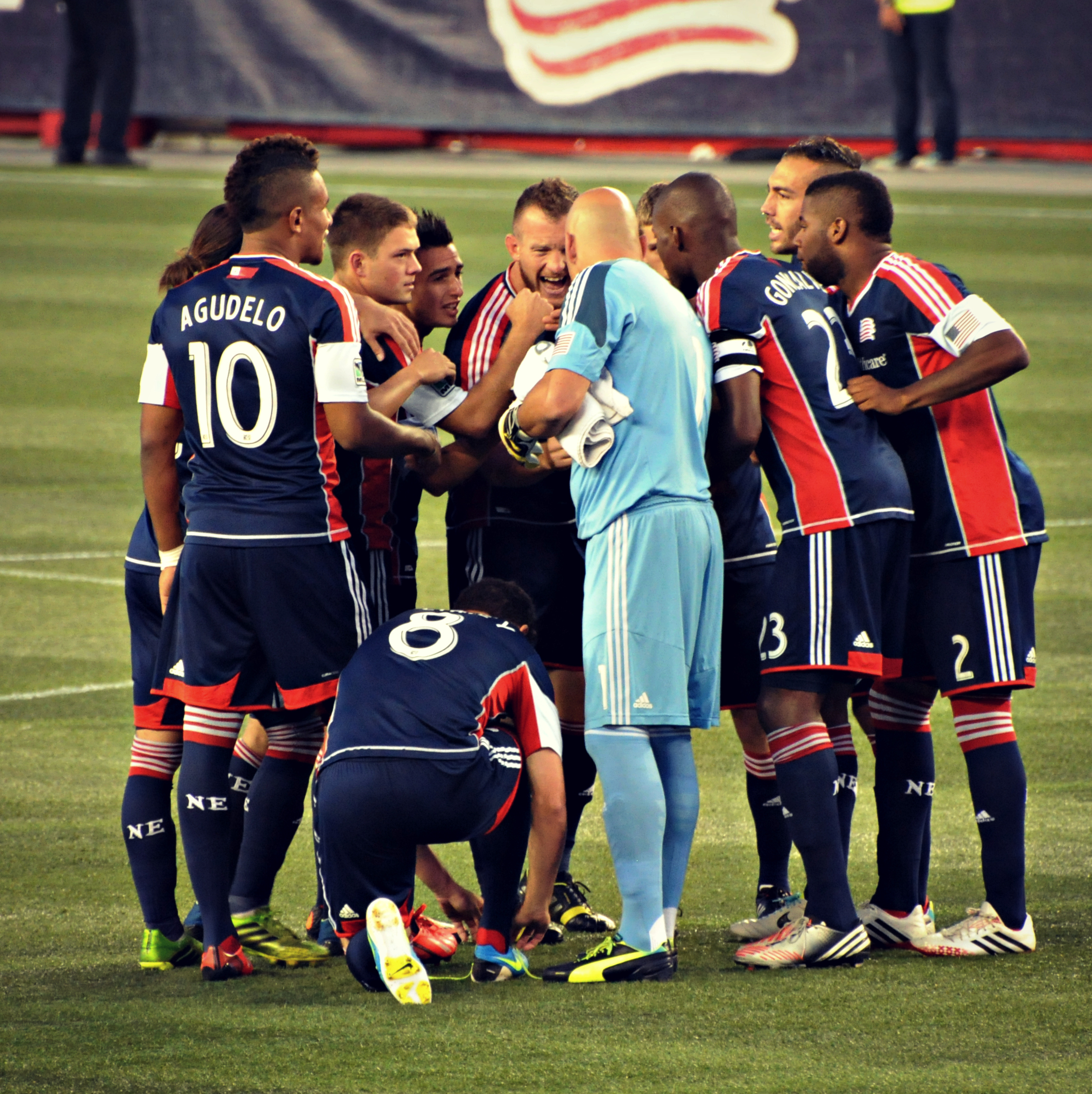
Revolution players before a home match in 2013.

The New England Revolution is a soccer team based in Foxborough, Massachusetts, that competes in Major League Soccer (MLS), the first-division league in the United States. The club began play in 1996 as one of ten original MLS teams.

As of the end of the 2024 season, a total of 309 players have participated in at least one league match for the Revolution, including 20 different goalkeepers. Seventeen players that haven't played in a league match have made appearances outside of MLS in the US Open Cup or Concacaf Champions League.

The club's all-time top goal scorer is Taylor Twellman with 101 league goals between 2002 and his retirement due to concussions in 2010. He holds a 48-goal lead over Diego Fagúndez. Carles Gil and Steve Ralston share the record for all-time assists, with 73 assists each. Andrew Farrell is the club's all-time appearance leader, with 341 appearances. He is the only player to reach more than 300 league matches with the club. Ten players have more than 200 appearances and 32 have more than 100 appearances.

== Players ==
A Major League Soccer club's active roster consists of up to 30 players. All 30 players are eligible for selection to each 18-player game-day squad during the regular season and playoffs. Players who were contracted to the club but never played a regular season MLS game are not listed below.

All statistics are for MLS regular season games only, including the group stage of the 2020 MLS is Back Tournament, and are correct as of November 10, 2024.

Key

DF = Defender

MF = Midfielder

FW = Forward/striker

=== Outfield players ===
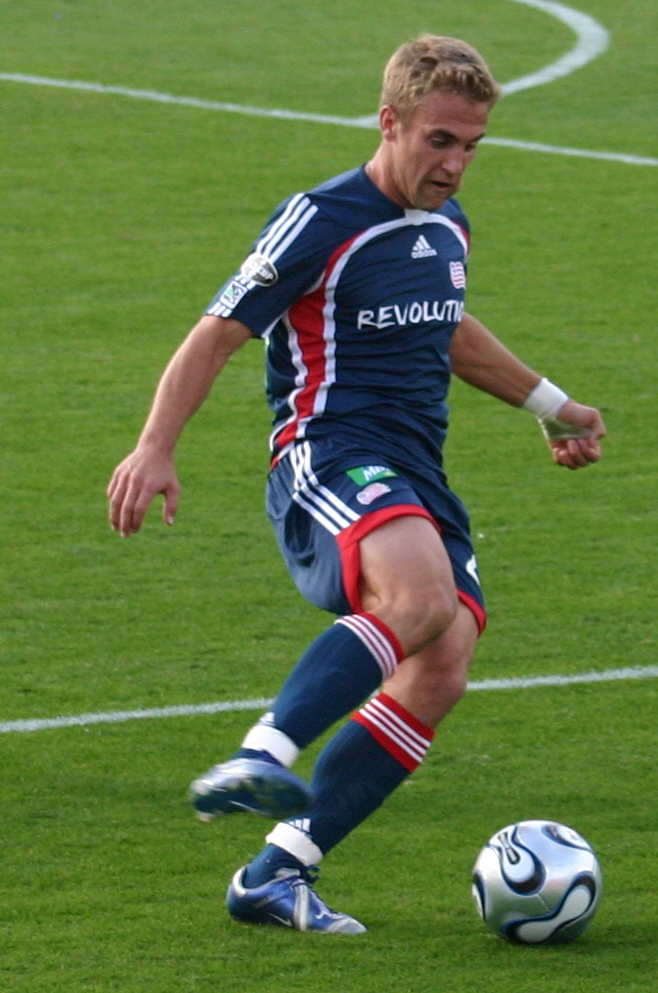
Taylor Twellman is the Revolution's all-time leading scorer with 101 league goals.

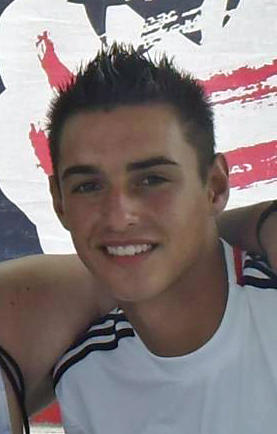
Diego Fagúndez is the Revolution's second leading scorer.

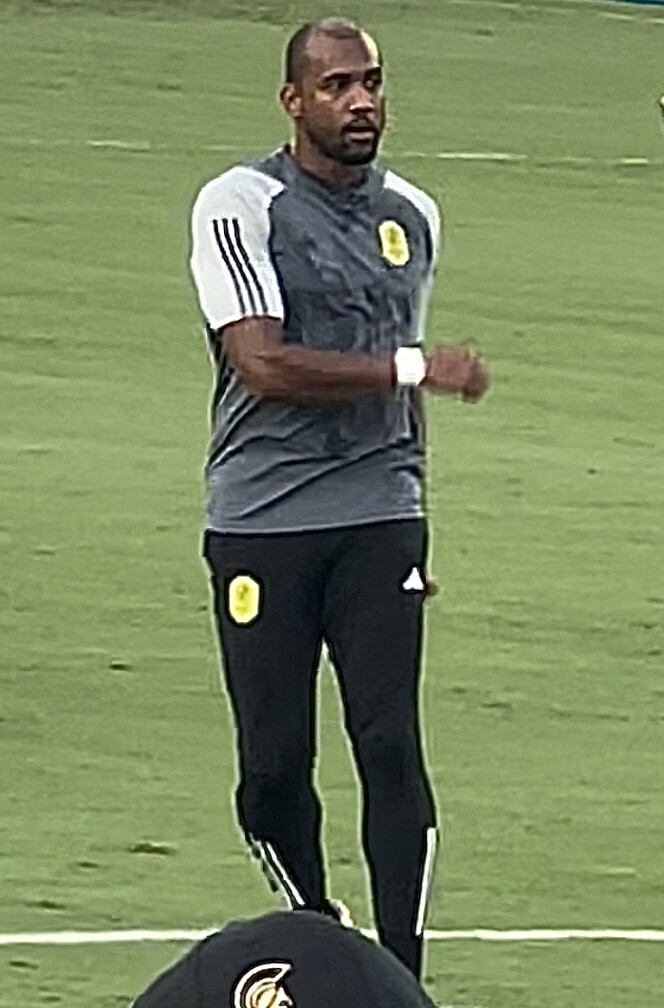
Teal Bunbury is the Revolution's fourth leading scorer.

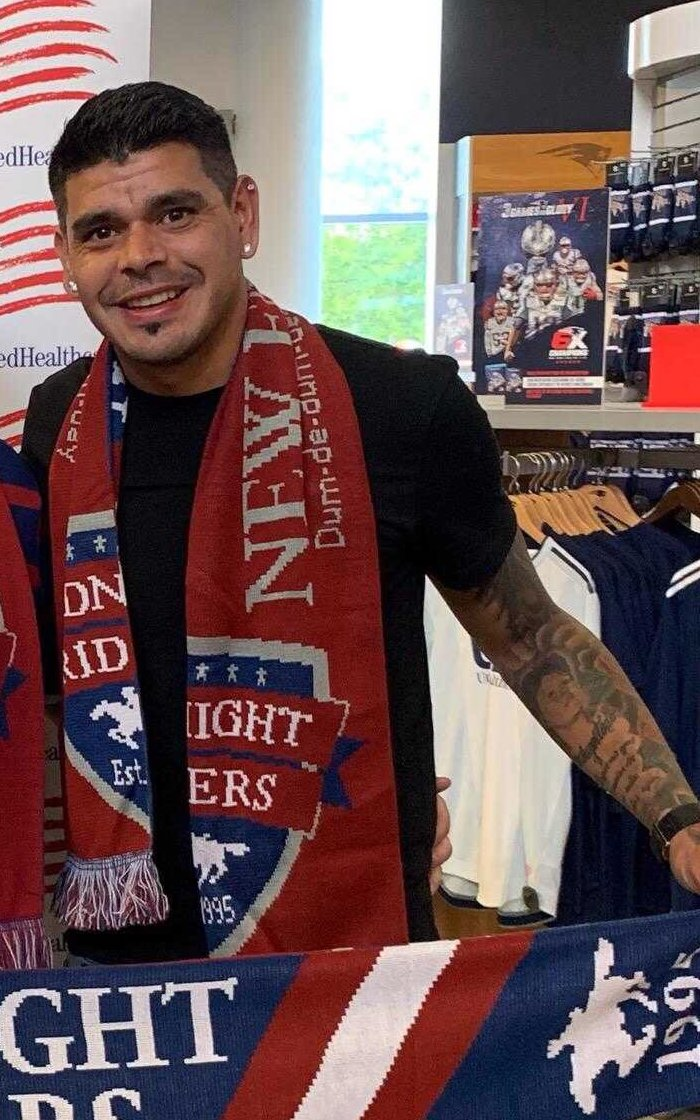
Gustavo Bou is the Revolution's fifth leading scorer.

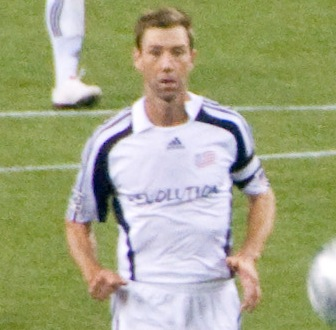
Steve Ralston is tied for the Revolution's all-time leading assist leader, and is sixth leading scorer.

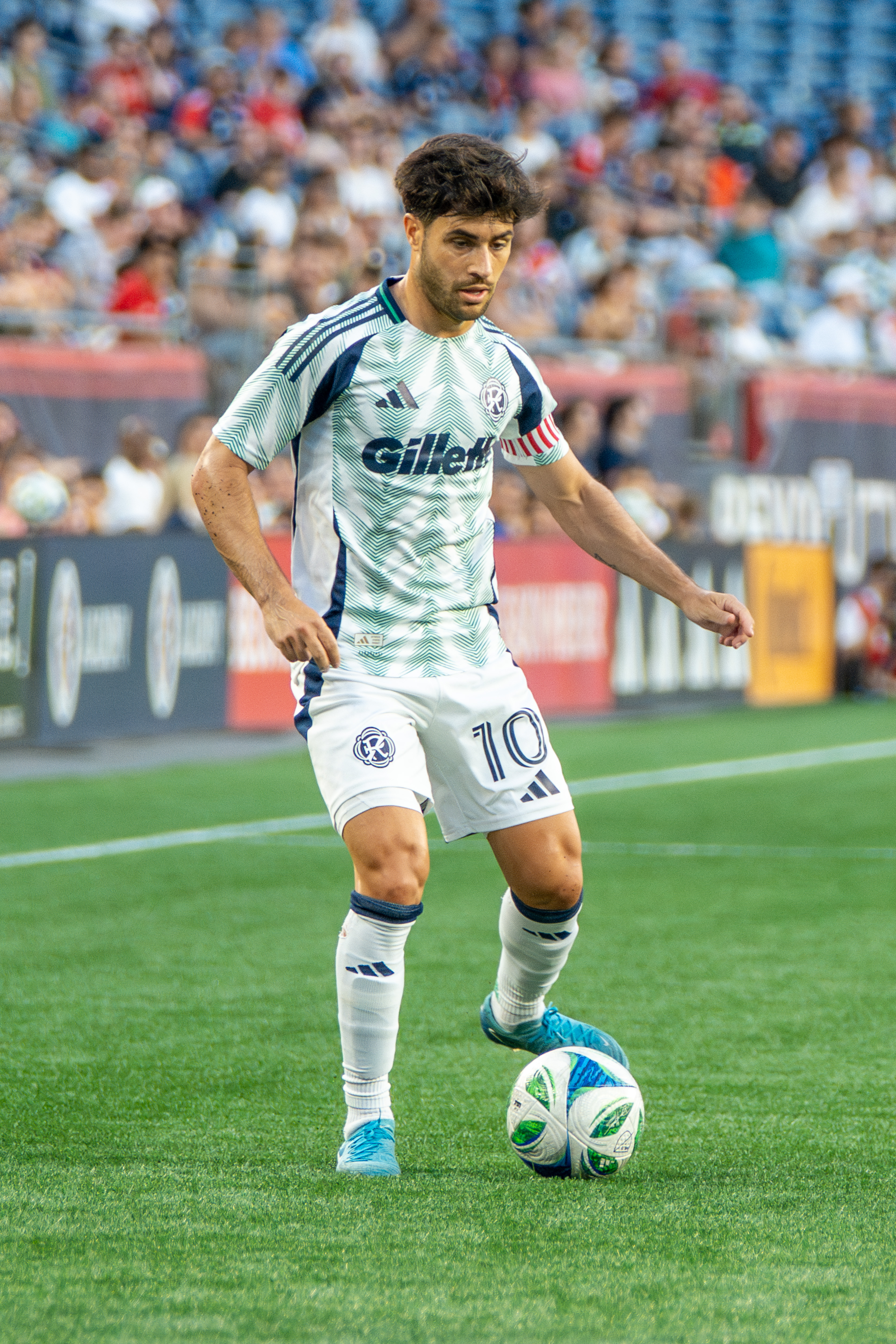
Carles Gil is tied for the Revolution's all-time leading assist leader, and is eighth leading scorer.

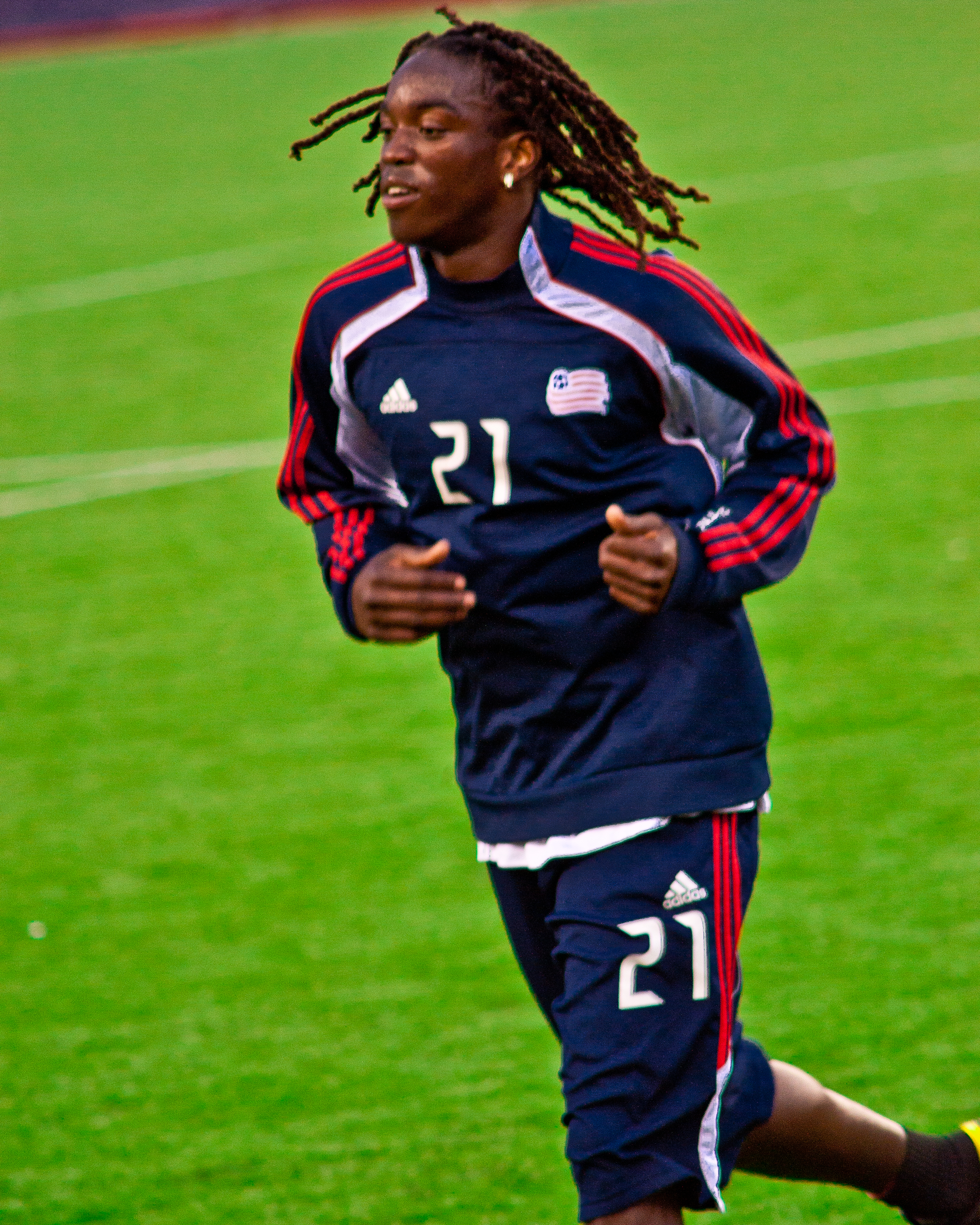
Shalrie Joseph is the Revolution's ninth leading scorer.

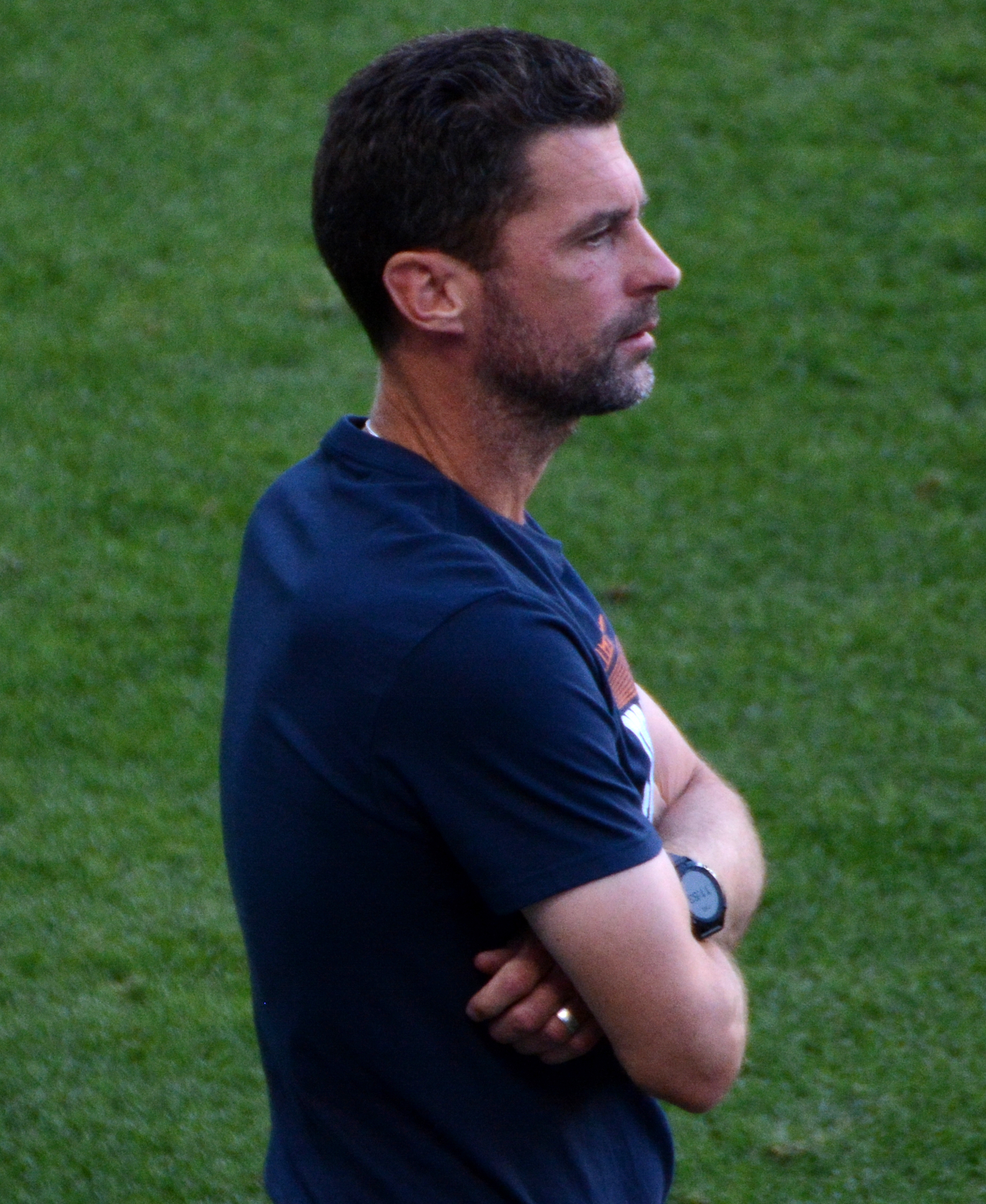
Pat Noonan is the Revolution's tenth leading scorer.

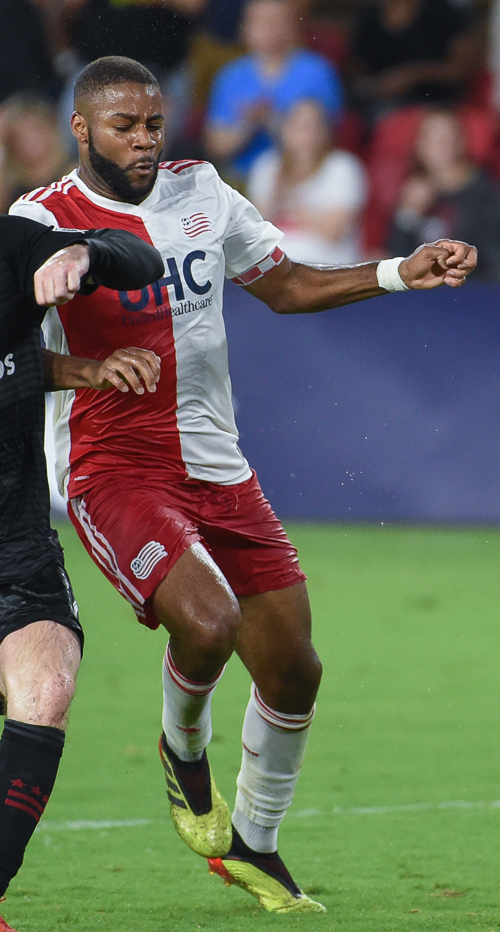
Andrew Farrell is the Revolution's all-time appearance leader, with 341 appearances.

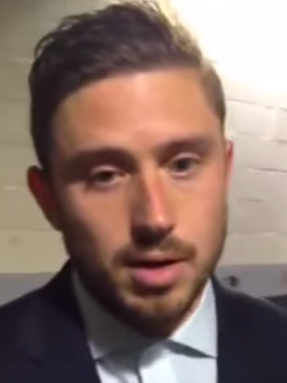
Chris Tierney made 246 appearances for the club, scoring 13 goals and 40 assists.

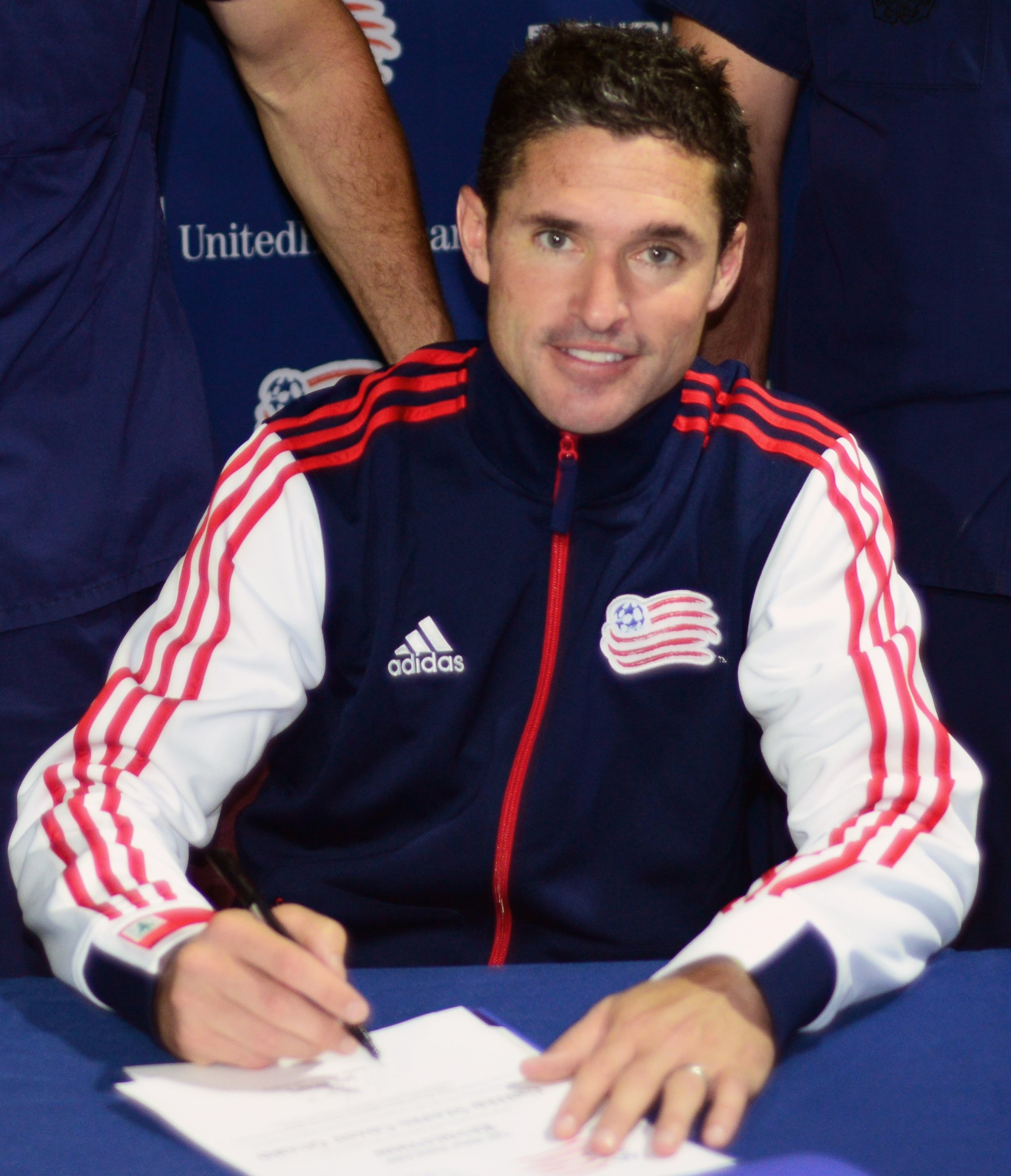
Jay Heaps made 243 appearances for the club, scoring nine goals and 26 assists.

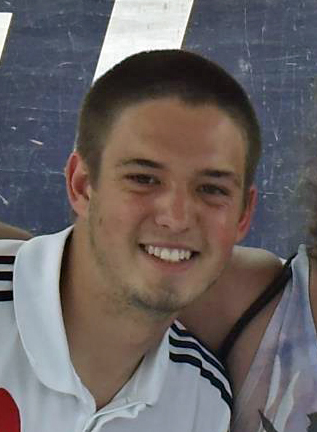
Kelyn Rowe made 222 appearances with the club, scoring 29 goals and 40 assists

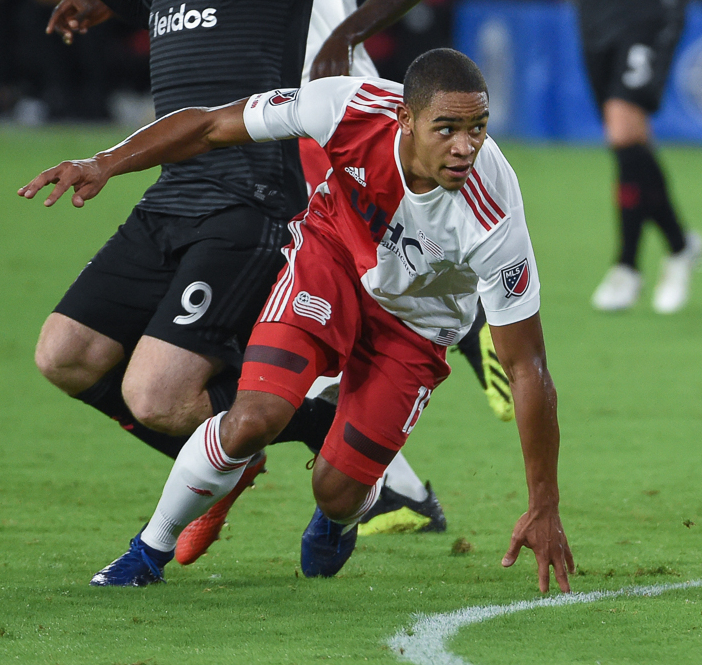
Brandon Bye has made 166 appearances with the club, scoring 10 goals and 8 assists

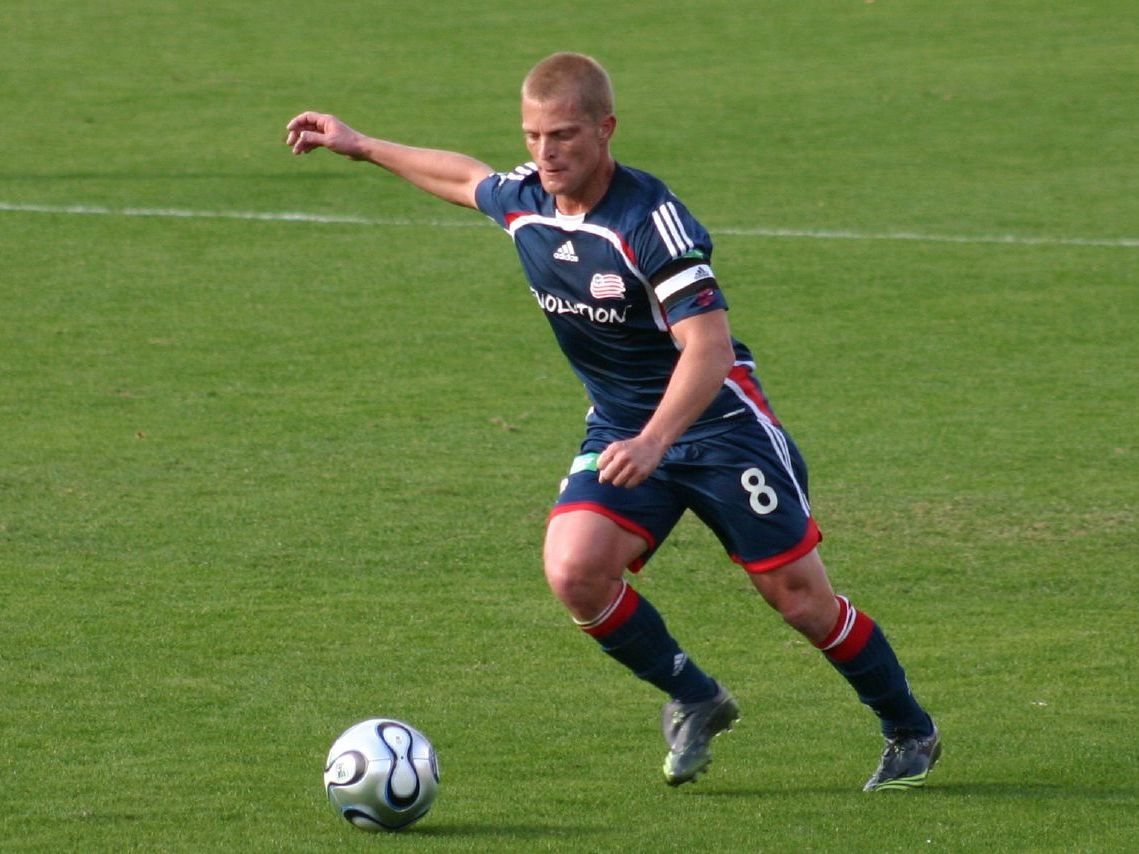
Joe Franchino made 162 appearances for the Revolution, scoring five goals and 16 assists.

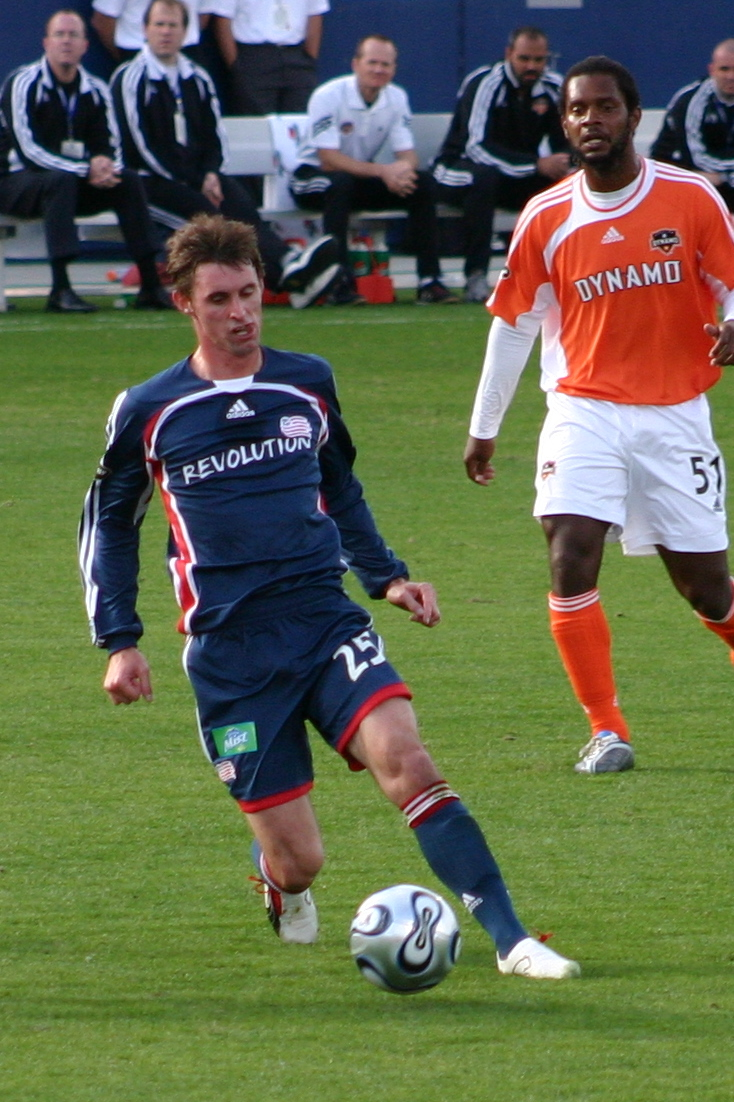
Andy Dorman appeared 158 times for the club, scoring 18 goals and 20 assists.

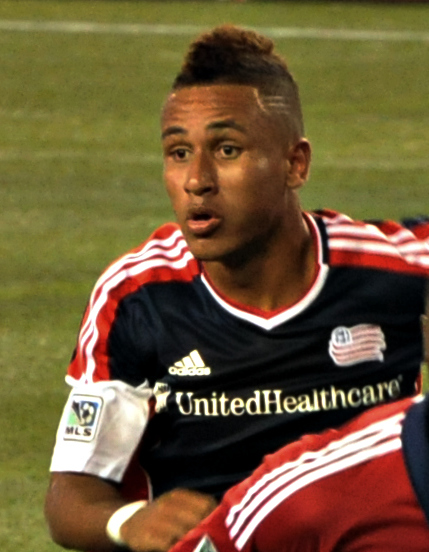
Juan Agudelo made 156 appearances for the club, scoring 35 goals and 16 assists.

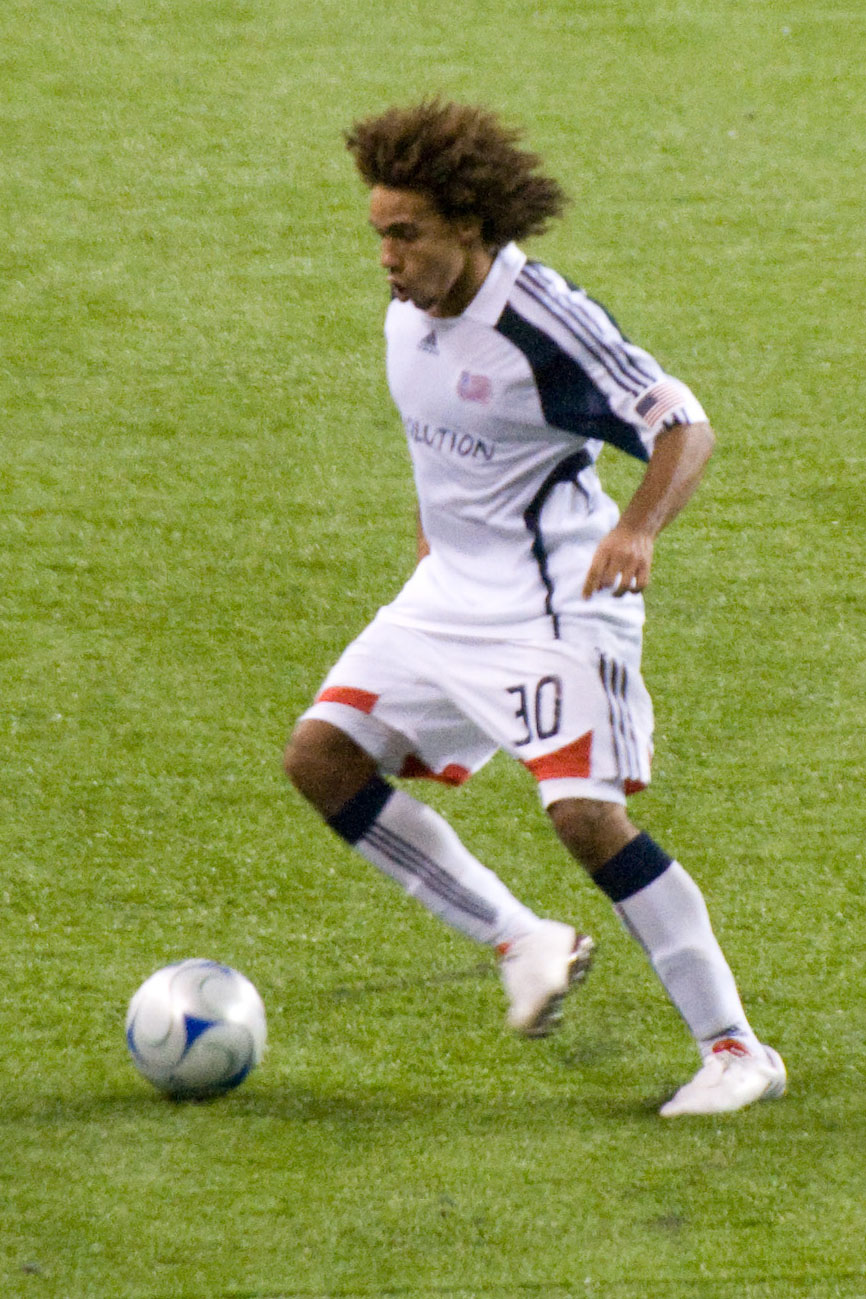
Defender Kevin Alston made 148 appearances for the club, scoring a single goal and assisting seven times.

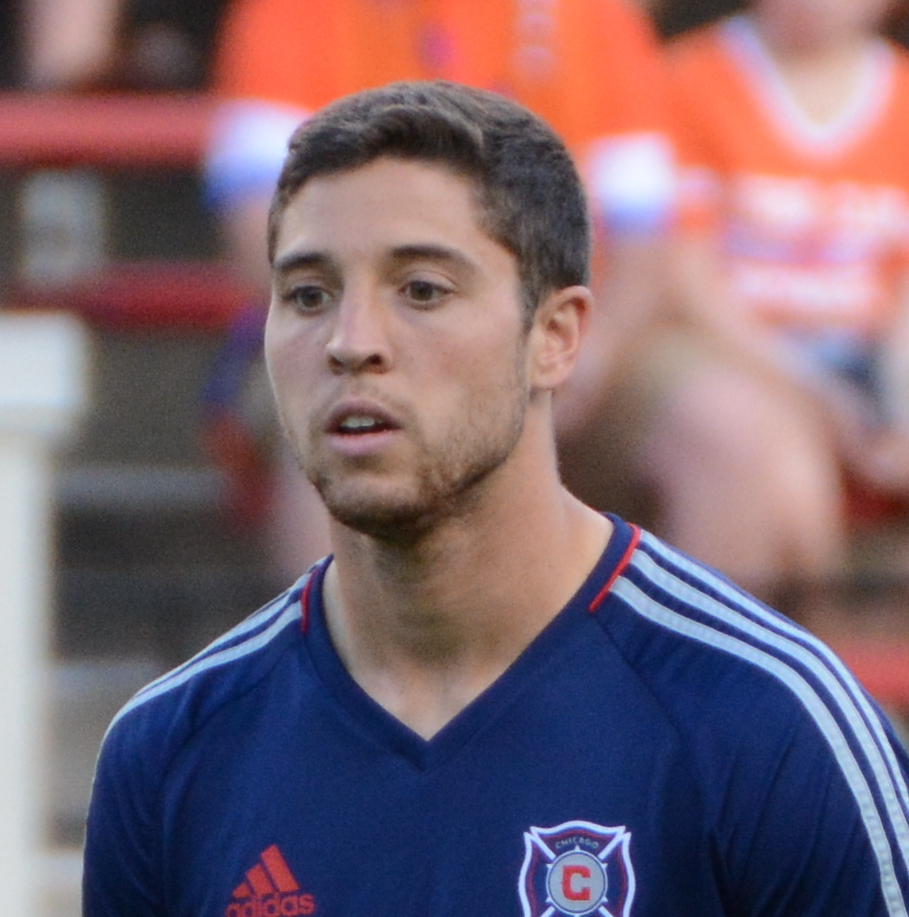
Midfielder Matt Polster made 135 appearances for the club, scoring six goals and assisting seven times.

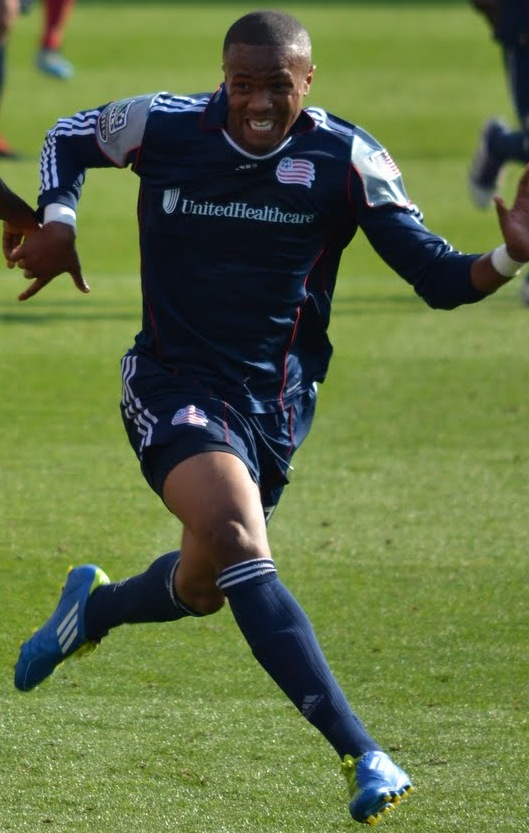
Defender Darrius Barnes made 129 appearances for the club, scoring two goals and assisting four times.

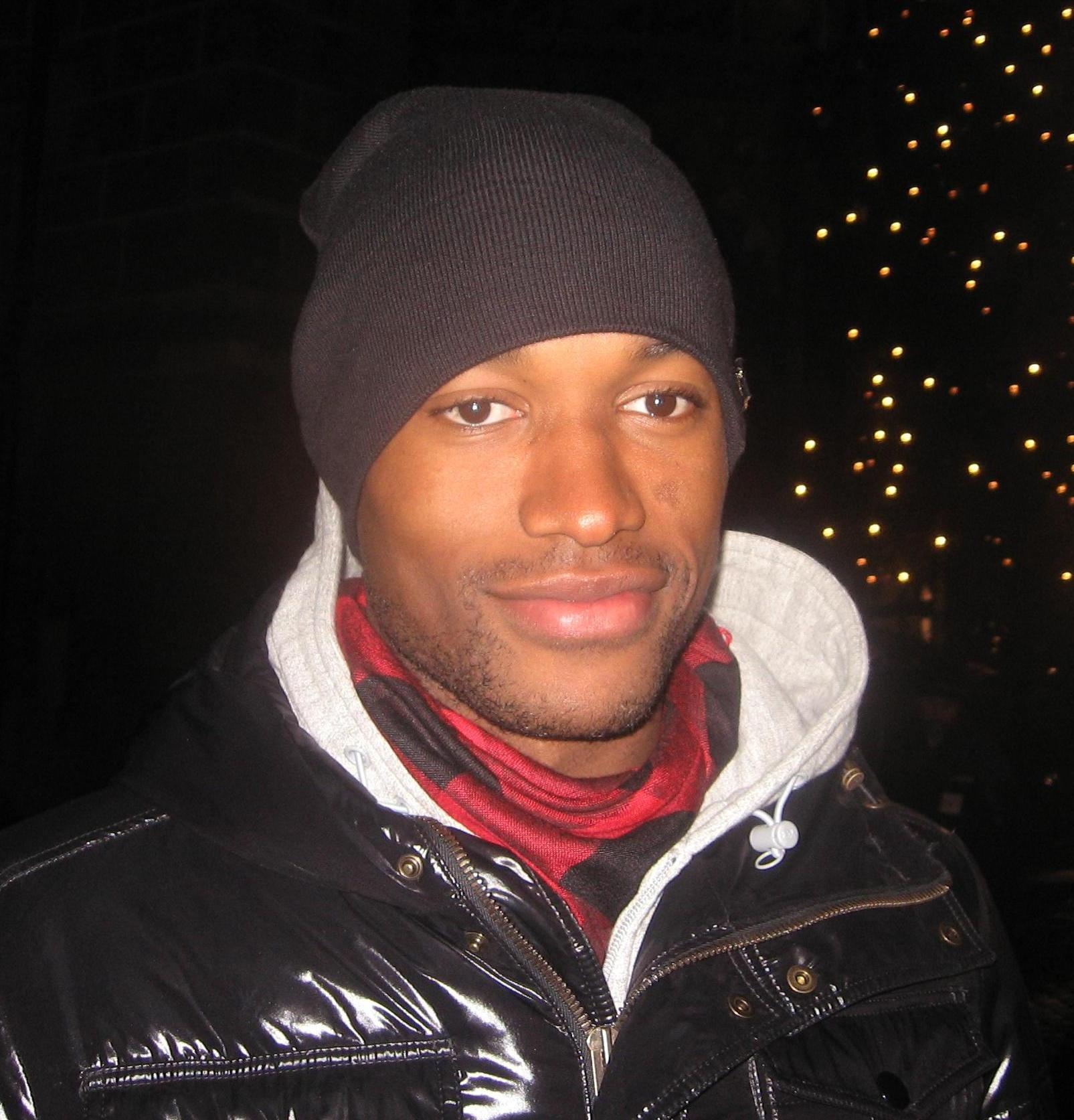
Defender José Gonçalves made 118 appearances for the club, scoring four goals and assisting four times.

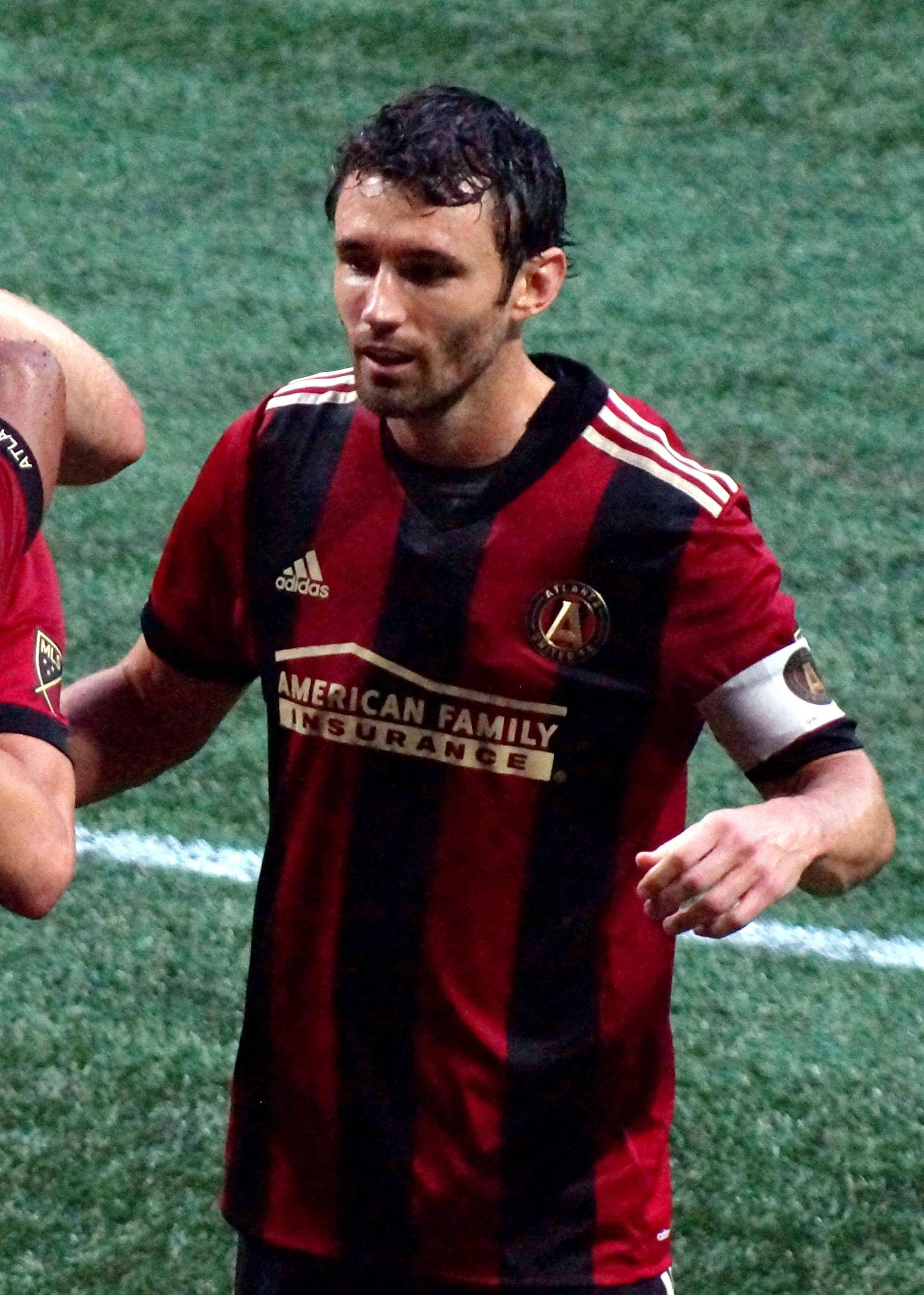
Defender Michael Parkhurst made 115 appearances for the club, scoring one goals and assisting once.

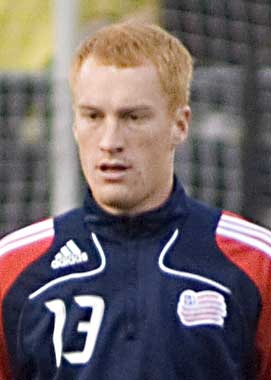
Forward Jeff Larentowicz made 111 appearances for the club, scoring nine goals and assisting nine times.

Name	Position	Country	Years	Games	Goals	Assists	Notes
José Manuel Abundis	FW	MEX	2006	2	1	0	
Juan Agudelo	FW	USA	2013; 2015–2019	156	35	16	
Pato Aguilera	MF	BOL	2001	1	0	0	
Chris Albright	DF	USA	2008–2009	27	0	0	
Yari Allnutt	FW	USA	2002	9	0	1	
Kevin Alston	DF	USA	2009–2015	148	1	7	
Jozy Altidore	FW	USA	2022–2023	27	2	0	
Leonel Alvarez	MF	COL	1999–2001	58	2	4	
Isaac Angking	MF	PUR	2018	3	0	0	
Benjamin Angoua	DF	CIV	2017	26	1	0	
Jalil Anibaba	DF	USA	2018–2019	53	1	3	
Xavier Arreaga	DF	ECU	2024	23	0	1	
Shaker Asad	MF	PLE	2000–2002	33	1	2	
Stephane Assengue	FW	CMR	2009	2	0	0	
Geoff Aunger	DF	CAN	1996	29	3	3	
Imad Baba	MF	USA	1996–2000	102	23	19	
Gabriel Badilla	DF	CRC	2008	6	0	0	
Chris Bagley	FW	USA	2003	3	0	0	
Jeff Baicher	MF	USA	1999	10	1	0	
Esmir Bajraktarević	FW	BIH	2022–2025	45	3	3	
Richie Baker	MF	IRE	2004	20	0	6	
Darrius Barnes	DF	USA	2009–2016	129	2	4	
Chad Barrett	FW	USA	2013	19	2	2	
Jamar Beasley	FW	USA	1998–2000	41	3	5	
Jon Bell	DF	USA	2021–2022	27	2	2	
Jerry Bengtson	FW	HON	2012–2014	36	4	0	
Latif Blessing	MF	GHA	2023	15	0	1	
Emmanuel Boateng	MF	GHA	2021–2024	89	8	3	
Zak Boggs	MF	USA	2010–2011	29	3	1	
Joshua Bolma	FW	GHA	2023	1	0	0	
Dylan Borrero	FW	COL	2022–2024	37	6	6	
Gustavo Bou	FW	ARG	2019–2023	100	44	20	
Blake Brettschneider	FW	USA	2012	17	2	1	
Félix Brillant	MF	CAN	2004	19	1	2	
Chris Brown	MF	USA	2003	3	3	0	
Kyle Brown	FW	USA	2006	12	0	1	
Tajon Buchanan	MF	CAN	2019–2021	60	10	9	
Noel Buck	MF	ENG	2022–2024	45	5	3	
Adam Buksa	FW	POL	2020–2022	64	29	8	
Teal Bunbury	FW	CAN	2014–2021	231	45	21	
Mike Burns	MF	USA	1996–2000	108	3	15	
Alexander Büttner	DF	NED	2020	15	0	3	
Brandon Bye	DF	USA	2018–2024	166	10	8	
Bryan Byrne	MF	IRE	2007	1	0	0	
Juan Fernando Caicedo	FW	COL	2019	27	5	3	
Luis Caicedo	MF	COL	2018–2021	65	1	4	
Scott Caldwell	MF	USA	2013–2021	229	5	18	
Dan Calichman	DF	USA	1999–2000	29	0	0	
José Cancela	MF	URU	2003–2006	84	6	27	
Milton Caraglio	FW	ARG	2011	12	3	2	
Fernando Cárdenas	MF	COL	2012	27	2	2	
Cássio	MF	BRA	2012	3	0	0	
Geoffrey Castillion	FW	NED	2014	1	0	0	
Edgar Castillo	DF	USA	2019	20	0	5	
Mauricio Castro	MF	HON	2008–2009	30	0	4	
Catê	MF	BRA	2001	22	8	8	
Tomás Chancalay	MF	ARG	2023–2024	23	8	1	
Ted Chronopoulos	DF	USA	1996–2002	144	16	14	
Kalifa Cissé	MF	FRA	2013	6	0	0	
Braeden Cloutier	MF	USA	2001–2002	24	0	4	
Ryan Cochrane	DF	USA	2011	22	1	1	
Nico Colaluca	MF	USA	2009–2010	7	0	0	
Chiquinho Conde	FW	MOZ	1997	17	6	4	
Franco Coria	DF	ARG	2011	18	0	0	
Adam Cristman	FW	USA	2007–2008	46	10	5	
Leo Cullen	MF	USA	2001–2003	58	2	4	
Ousmane Dabo	MF	FRA	2011	3	0	0	
Chaka Daley	DF	CAN	1999	2	0	0	
Damián	FW	MEX	1998	2	0	0	
Charlie Davies	FW	USA	2013–2016	64	14	8	
John DeBrito	DF	CPV	1996	21	0	4	
A. J. DeLaGarza	DF	GUM	2021–2022	14	0	1	
Antonio Delamea	DF	SVN	2017–2020	69	3	2	
Clint Dempsey	FW	USA	2004–2006	71	25	14	
Mamadou Diallo	FW	SEN	2002	7	1	1	
Marcos Dias	FW	BRA	2024	1	0	0	
Raúl Díaz Arce	FW	SLV	1998	32	18	8	
Claude Dielna	DF	FRA	2017–2018	28	0	0	
Didier Domi	DF	FRA	2011	9	0	1	
Andy Dorman	MF	WAL	2004–2015	158	18	20	
Paulo Dos Santos	MF	CPV	1999	16	0	0	
Nick Downing	DF	USA	2001–2002	17	0	0	
Kheli Dube	FW	ZIM	2008–2011	72	14	9	
Bilal Duckett	DF	USA	2013	1	0	0	
Brian Dunseth	DF	USA	1997–2001	82	1	1	
Connally Edozien	MF	NGA	2005	9	0	0	
Adam Eyre	DF	USA	2000	10	0	0	
Darío Fabbro	FW	USA	2003	8	2	0	
Diego Fagúndez	MF	URU	2011–2020	261	53	45	
Alejandro Farías	MF	ARG	1997	25	1	3	
Andrew Farrell	DF	USA	2013–2024	341	2	12	
Benny Feilhaber	MF	USA	2011–2012	52	5	9	
Argenis Fernández	FW	CRC	2008	2	0	0	
Gary Flood	MF	USA	2007–2008	10	0	0	
Joe Franchino	MF	USA	2000–2008	162	5	16	
Iain Fraser	DF	CAN	1996	23	0	1	
Malcolm Fry	FW	USA	2024	2	0	0	
Ian Fuller	FW	USA	2002	11	0	3	
Giuseppe Galderisi	FW	ITA	1996–1997	11	0	2	
Jani Galik	MF	CZE	2006	2	0	0	
Blair Gavin	MF	USA	2012	2	0	0	
Sam George	MF	USA	1997	16	1	0	
Joe Germanese	MF	USA	2008	1	0	0	
Cory Gibbs	DF	USA	2010	25	0	0	
Carles Gil	MF	ESP	2019–2024	153	39	73	
Nacho Gil	MF	ESP	2022–2024	30	1	3	
José Gonçalves	DF	POR	2013–2016	118	4	4	
Omar Gonzalez	DF	USA	2022–2023	32	1	0	
Mario Gori	DF	ARG	1999	17	0	1	
Edwin Gorter	MF	NED	1998–1999	34	8	7	
Richard Goulooze	DF	ARG	1998–1999	40	1	2	
Ariel Graziani	FW	ECU	1999	3	0	0	
Jason Griffiths	MF	ENG	2010	10	0	0	
Winston Griffiths	MF	JAM	2002	8	0	2	
Ryan Guy	MF	GUM	2011–2013	45	4	2	
Jeremy Hall	DF	USA	2015	12	0	0	
Ian Harkes	MF	ENG	2023–2024	36	3	4	
John Harkes	MF	USA	1999–2001	55	2	14	
Wolde Harris	FW	JAM	2000–2003	91	24	14	
Bill Harte	MF	USA	1997	5	0	1	
Guillermo Hauche	FW	ARG	2018	4	0	0	
Jay Heaps	DF	USA	2001–2009	243	9	26	
Zachary Herivaux	MF	HAI	2016; 2018	10	0	0	
Daniel Hernandez	DF	USA	2002–2006	42	3	3	
Chase Hilgenbrinck	DF	USA	2008	4	0	0	
Femi Hollinger-Janzen	FW	BEN	2016–2017	32	2	1	
Jamie Holmes	FW	USA	2005	1	0	0	
Steve Howey	DF	ENG	2004	3	0	0	
Eduardo Hurtado	FW	USA	2000	3	0	0	
Zak Ibsen	MF	USA	1996	6	0	0	
Amaechi Igwe	DF	USA	2008–2009	22	0	0	
Dimitry Imbongo	FW	COD	2012–2014	32	4	4	
Erik Imler	MF	USA	1997	15	0	0	
Rob Jachym	FW	POL	1997	6	0	0	
Jair	MF	CPV	1998–1999	29	4	2	
Edgaras Jankauskas	FW	LTU	2009–2010	14	2	1	
Avery John	DF	TRI	2004–2007	64	0	2	
DeJuan Jones	DF	USA	2019–2024	142	6	22	
Jermaine Jones	MF	USA	2014–2015	28	2	4	
Shalrie Joseph	MF	GRN	2003–2012	261	37	33	
Kei Kamara	FW	SLE	2016–2017	52	19	7	
Brian Kamler	MF	USA	2002–2004	66	8	12	
Daouda Kanté	DF	MLI	2002–2004	28	1	0	
Ibrahim Kante	FW	MLI	2003	2	0	0	
Wilfrid Kaptoum	MF	USA	2021–2022	42	2	3	
Mark-Anthony Kaye	MF	USA	2023–2024	31	0	3	
Paul Keegan	FW	IRE	1996–2000	84	7	10	
Kris Kelderman	MF	USA	1999	18	0	2	
John Kerr	FW	USA	1996–1997	26	4	5	
Henry Kessler	DF	USA	2020–2024	98	4	0	
Ryan Kinne	FW	USA	2011	1	0	0	
Edward Kizza	FW	UGA	2021	11	0	1	
Steve Klein	MF	USA	1997	4	0	0	
Daigo Kobayashi	MF	JPN	2014–2017	94	2	6	
Gershon Koffie	MF	GHA	2016–2017	45	0	4	
Xavier Kouassi	MF	CIV	2017	23	1	1	
Tony Kuhn	FW	USA	1999	6	0	0	
Alexi Lalas	DF	USA	1996–1997	55	3	4	
Greg Lalas	DF	USA	1997	2	0	0	
Luca Langoni	FW	ARG	2024	11	3	2	
Jeff Larentowicz	MF	USA	2005–2009	111	9	9	
Ryan Latham	FW	USA	2005	6	0	0	
Florian Lechner	DF	GER	2012	9	0	1	
Rajko Lekić	FW	DEN	2011	23	6	1	
Marshall Leonard	MF	USA	2003–2006	63	1	2	
Nick Lima	DF	USA	2024	25	1	0	
Roberto Linck	FW	BRA	2010	2	0	0	
Tom Lips	DF	PUR	1996	8	0	0	
Carlos Llamosa	DF	COL	2002–2003	38	0	1	
Sebastian Lletget	MF	USA	2022	19	2	5	
Tony Lochhead	DF	NZL	2006	16	0	2	
John Lozano	DF	COL	2012	2	0	0	
Cristhian Machado	MF	BOL	2018	3	0	0	
Maciel	MF	BRA	2021–2022	35	0	1	
Christian Mafla	DF	COL	2021	9	0	0	
Christian Makoun	DF	COL	2022–2023	17	0	1	
Michael Mancienne	DF	ENG	2018–2020	31	1	0	
Kekuta Manneh	FW	GAM	2020	6	1	1	
Abdoulie Mansally	DF	GAM	2007–2011	89	7	5	
Stephen McCarthy	DF	USA	2011–2014	69	2	2	
Ivan McKinley	DF	RSA	1997–2014	77	13	7	
Tom McLaughlin	FW	USA	1998	1	0	0	
Tommy McNamara	MF	USA	2020–2024	85	6	13	
Victor Mella	MF	CHI	1996	3	0	0	
Jonathan Mensah	DF	GHA	2024	8	0	0	
Janusz Michallik	MF	COL	1998	12	0	0	
Peyton Miller	DF	USA	2024	10	0	1	
Dahir Mohammed	DF	USA	1998	7	0	0	
Jason Moore	MF	USA	2003	13	0	0	
Joe-Max Moore	FW	USA	1996–1999; 2003–2004	96	41	35	
Jose Luis Morales	FW	ESP	2000	8	1	0	
José Moreno	FW	COL	2012	7	1	0	
Manny Motajo	DF	USA	1998–1999	17	0	2	
Patrick Mullins	FW	USA	2014	21	4	1	
David Nakhid	MF	TRI	1998	18	0	0	
Beto Naveda	FW	ARG	1996–1997	54	13	13	
Krisztián Németh	FW	HUN	2017–2018	21	1	3	
Steve Neumann	MF	USA	2014–2016	36	0	0	
Lee Nguyen	MF	USA	2012–2017; 2020	203	52	50	
Joseph Niouky	MF	SEN	2010	13	0	1	
Pat Noonan	FW	USA	2003–2007	119	37	29	
Sainey Nyassi	MF	GAM	2007–2012	104	8	4	
Arsène Oka	MF	CIV	2007	1	0	0	
Francis Okaroh	DF	NGA	1996–1997	49	0	0	
Matt Okoh	FW	USA	2001	18	6	2	
Sean Okoli	FW	USA	2015	5	0	0	
Patrick Olalere	FW	NGA	1997	1	0	0	
Emmanuel Osei	DF	GHA	2009–2010	44	0	1	
Jack Panayotou	MF	USA	2023–2024	17	0	0	
Óscar Pareja	MF	COL	1998	13	0	5	
Tim Parker	DF	USA	2024	7	0	0	
Michael Parkhurst	DF	USA	2005–2008	115	1	1	
Carlos Parra	MF	USA	1999–2000	26	1	0	
Cristian Penilla	FW	ECU	2018–2020	80	19	18	
Marko Perovic	MF	SRB	2010–2011	29	7	4	
Pat Phelan	MF	USA	2008–2011	80	2	4	
Ricardo Phillips	MF	PAN	2005	4	0	0	
Rusty Pierce	DF	USA	2000–2004	101	0	0	
Álex Pineda Chacón	MF	HON	2002	20	2	2	
Tyler Polak	DF	USA	2012	1	0	0	
Matt Polster	MF	USA	2020–2024	135	6	7	
Alec Purdie	FW	USA	2012	5	0	0	
Steve Ralston	MF	USA	2002–2009	201	42	73	
Mauricio Ramos	MF	BOL	2000	21	3	8	
Justin Rennicks	FW	USA	2019–2023	39	2	0	
Ben Reveno	DF	USA	2022	1	0	0	
James Riley	DF	USA	2005–2007	70	1	3	
Damian Rivera	MF	USA	2021–2023	21	1	0	
Carlos Rocha	FW	POR	1998–1999	17	0	1	
Dave Romney	DF	USA	2023–2024	61	1	1	
Jim Rooney	MF	USA	2002	20	1	2	
Kelyn Rowe	MF	USA	2012–2020	222	29	40	
Björn Runström	FW	SWE	2012	3	0	0	
Samba	DF	POR	2016	2	0	0	
Will Sands	DF	USA	2024	5	0	2	
Giovanni Savarese	FW	VEN	1999	27	10	2	
Darren Sawatzky	FW	USA	1996–1997	54	5	5	
Zack Schilawski	FW	USA	2010–2011	50	6	1	
Mark Segbers	DF	USA	2018	1	0	0	
Carlos Semedo	DF	POR	2002	9	0	1	
Saër Sène	FW	FRA	2012–2014	59	17	8	
Diego Serna	FW	COL	2002	5	1	1	
Clyde Simms	MF	USA	2012–2013	39	0	2	
Willie Sims	FW	GUA	2006	9	0	0	
Seth Sinovic	DF	USA	2010; 2020	21	0	0	
Donnie Smith	DF	USA	2013–2017	6	0	0	
Josh Smith	DF	USA	2017	6	0	0	
Khano Smith	MF	BER	2005–2010	101	8	12	
A. J. Soares	DF	USA	2011–2014	108	6	1	
Gabriel Somi	DF	SYR	2011–2014	108	6	1	
Ryan Spaulding	DF	USA	2022–2024	27	0	0	
Leonardo Squadrone	DF	ARG	1997	23	0	0	
Ilija Stolica	FW	SRB	2010–2011	16	4	2	
William Sunsing	FW	CRC	2000–2001	48	4	4	
Ben Sweat	DF	USA	2023	10	0	0	
Patrick Tardieu	FW	HAI	1996	5	0	0	
Tony Taylor	FW	USA	2014	1	0	0	
Wells Thompson	MF	USA	2007–2009	71	2	3	
Chris Tierney	DF	USA	2008–2018	246	13	40	
Juan Toja	MF	COL	2012–2013	23	1	0	
Johnny Torres	FW	COL	1998–2001	88	8	14	
Arnór Ingvi Traustason	MF	ISL	2021–2022	44	2	8	
Taylor Twellman	FW	USA	2002–2009	174	101	28	
Robert Ukrop	FW	USA	1996	9	2	1	
Jesse Van Saun	FW	USA	1998	5	0	0	
Jorge Vázquez	MF	ARG	2003	4	0	1	
Luke Vercollone	MF	USA	2004–2005	5	0	0	
Michael Videira	MF	USA	2009	12	0	0	
Giacomo Vrioni	FW	ALB	2022–2024	67	16	3	
Bojan Vučković	FW	SRB	2012	1	0	0	
Je-Vaughn Watson	DF	JAM	2016–2017	41	1	1	
Mark Watson	DF	CAN	1996	4	1	0	
Richard Weiszmann	DF	SVK	1996	10	0	0	
Wélton	FW	BRA	1996	29	3	6	
Jeremiah White	MF	USA	2012	2	0	0	
Marquis White	FW	USA	2012	2	0	0	
Andy Williams	MF	CAN	2012	25	3	9	
John Wilson	DF	USA	2002	1	1	0	
Evans Wise	MF	TRI	1997–1998	21	1	1	
John Wolyniec	FW	USA	2001	1	0	0	
Bobby Wood	FW	USA	2023–2024	47	10	5	
London Woodberry	DF	USA	2015–2017	46	1	2	
Peter Woodring	DF	USA	1996	21	1	3	
Alan Woods	DF	USA	2001	18	0	0	
Brian Wright	DF	CAN	2017–2019	14	1	0	
Mauricio Wright	DF	CRC	2000–2001	40	3	1	
Kevin Wylie	FW	USA	1996–1997	25	0	2	
Eric Wynalda	FW	USA	2000–2001	8	0	1	
Danny Wynn	DF	USA	2006	2	0	0	
Alhassan Yusuf	MF	NGA	2024	7	0	2	
Wilfried Zahibo	MF	FRA	2018–2020	58	5	5	
Monsef Zerka	MF	FRA	2011	7	2	1	
Fabio Zúñiga	FW	USA	2000	1	0	0	

=== Goalkeepers ===
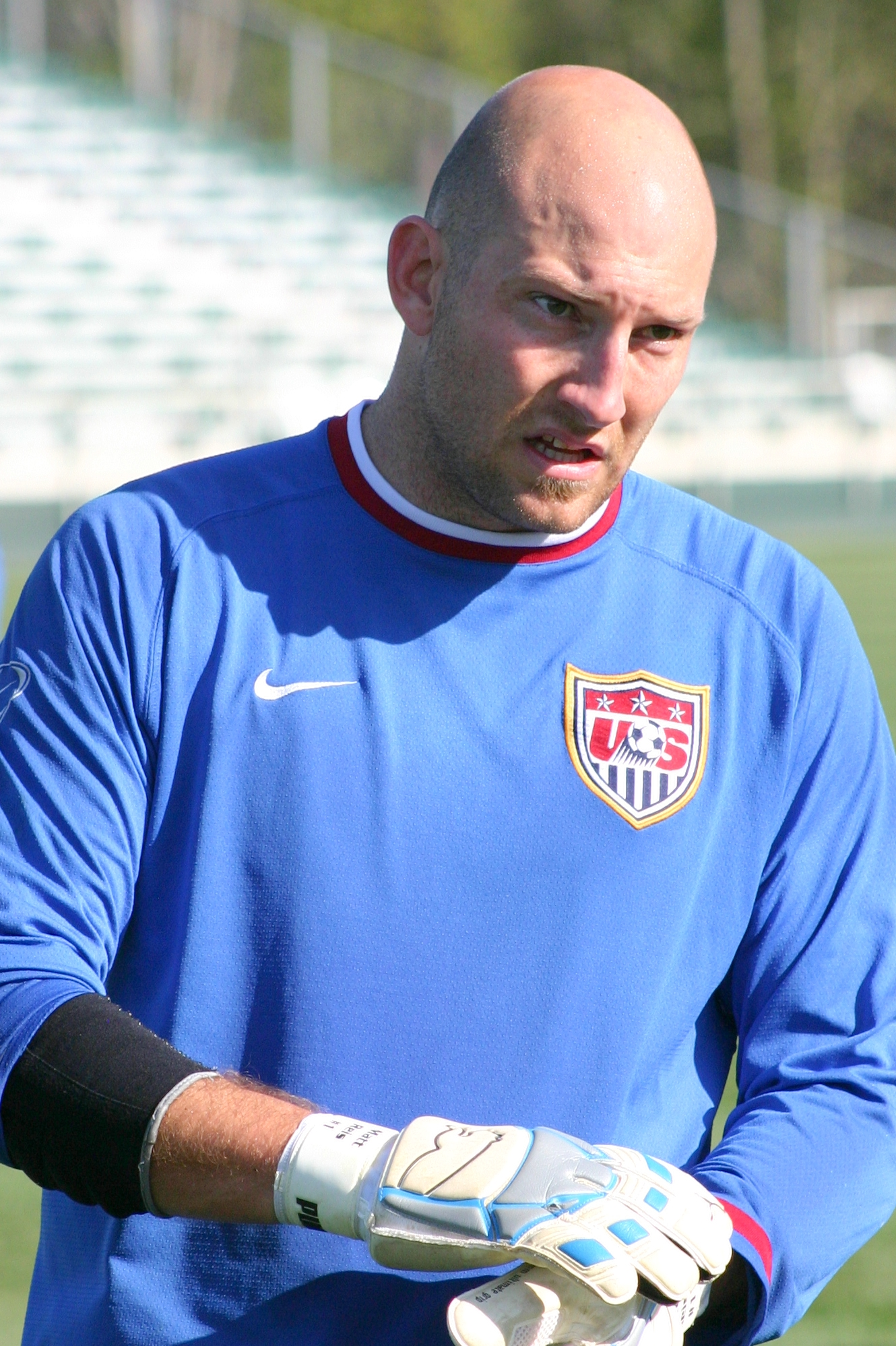
Matt Reis has made more appearances (254) than any other Revolution keeper.

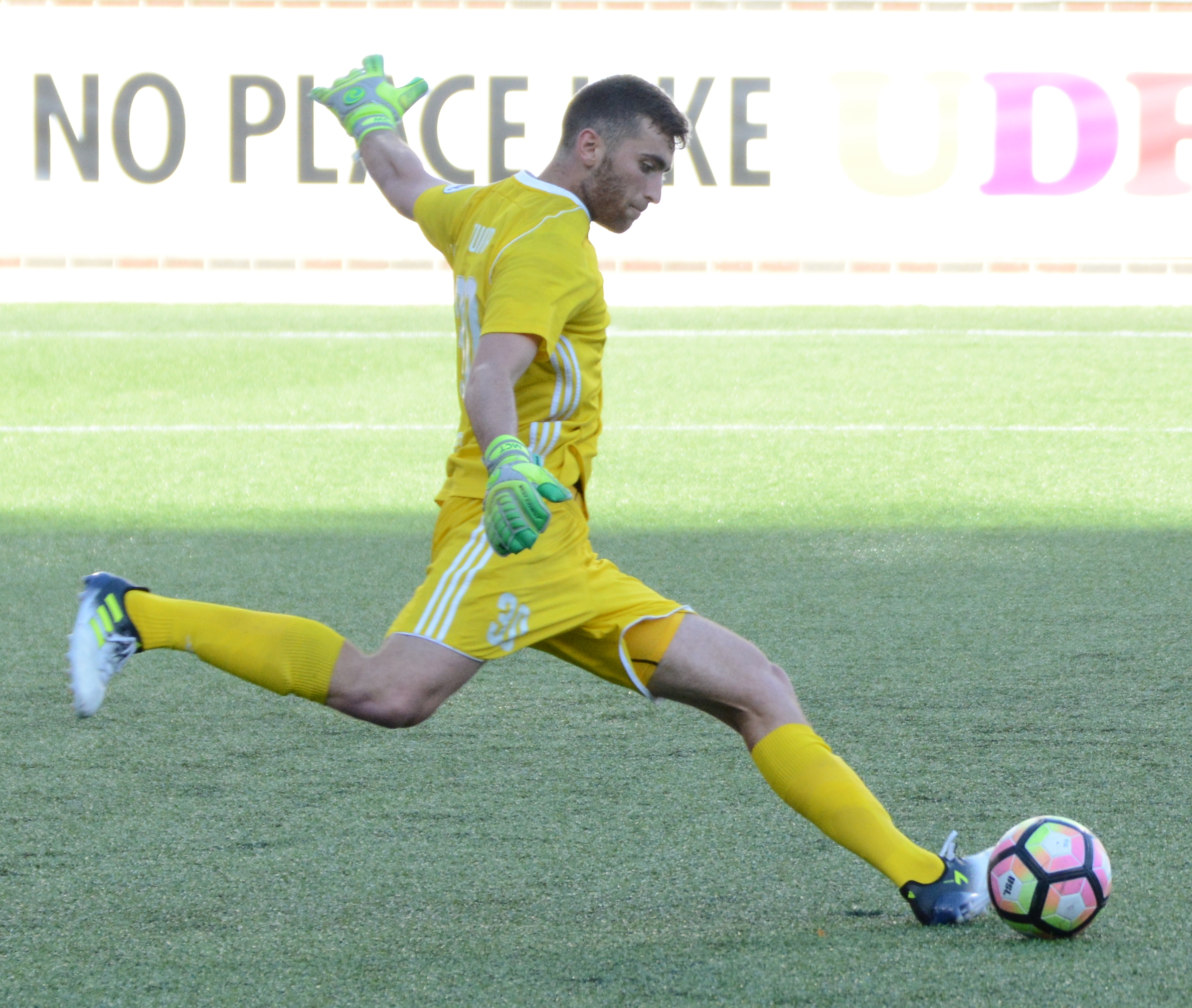
Matt Turner has made 135 appearances for the Revolution, the second-most for a goalkeeper.

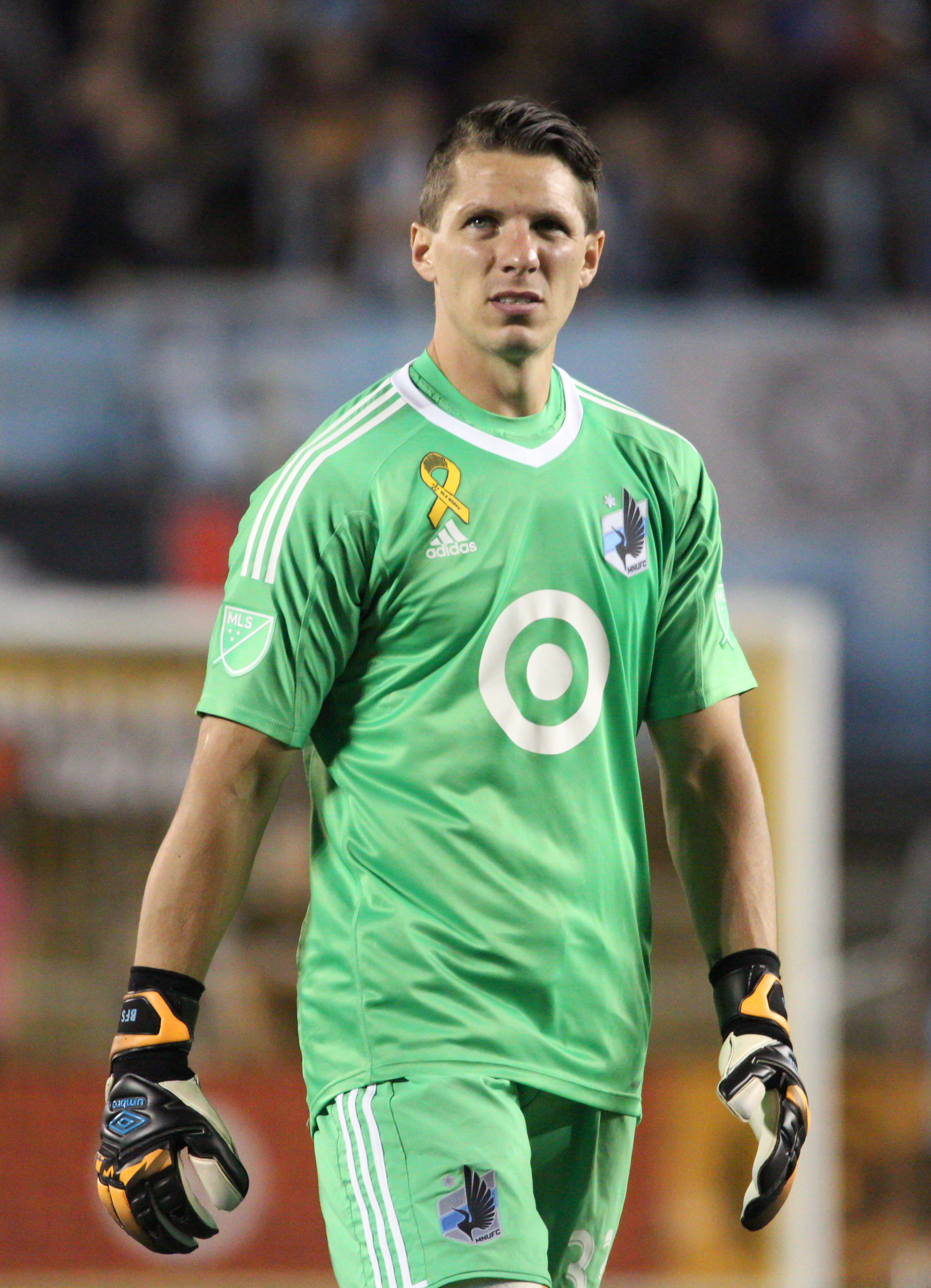
Bobby Shuttleworth has made 127 appearances for the Revolution, the third-most for a goalkeeper.

Name	Country	Years	Games	Conceded	Shutouts (Note: A shutout occurs when a goalkeeper plays in a game without conceding a goal. This is sometimes known outside North America as a clean sheet.)	Notes
Adin Brown	USA	2002–2004	48	68	10	
Preston Burpo	USA	2010	11	16	2	
Jeff Causey	USA	1997–2001	64	92	5	
Cody Cropper	USA	2016–2019; 2019	36	67	10	
Earl Edwards Jr.	USA	2022–2024	15	24	2	
Jose Fernandez	BOL	2001	7	12	1	
Aidan Heaney	USA	1996	19	29	4	
Aljaž Ivačič	SVN	2024	25	56	4	
Jacob Jackson	USA	2023	2	4	0	
Brad Knighton	USA	2009–2022	56	94	9	
Đorđe Petrović	SRB	2022–2023	43	54	14	
Henrich Ravas	SVK	2024	8	17	1	
Matt Reis	USA	2003–2013	254	331	66	
Bobby Shuttleworth	USA	2010–2016	127	178	34	
Kyle Singer	USA	2003	1	0	0	
Juergen Sommer	USA	2000–2002	33	61	5	
Jim St. Andre	USA	1996	15	27	2	
Matt Turner	USA	2018–2022; 2025–	135	102	22	
Doug Warren	USA	2005; 2008	5	7	0	
Walter Zenga	ITA	1997; 1999	47	73	8	

== Additional players ==
In addition to competing in Major League Soccer every year, the New England Revolution participate in other competitions such as the Lamar Hunt U.S. Open Cup and the CONCACAF Champions League. Below is a list of players who have not appeared in a league match, but have played for the team in other competitions.

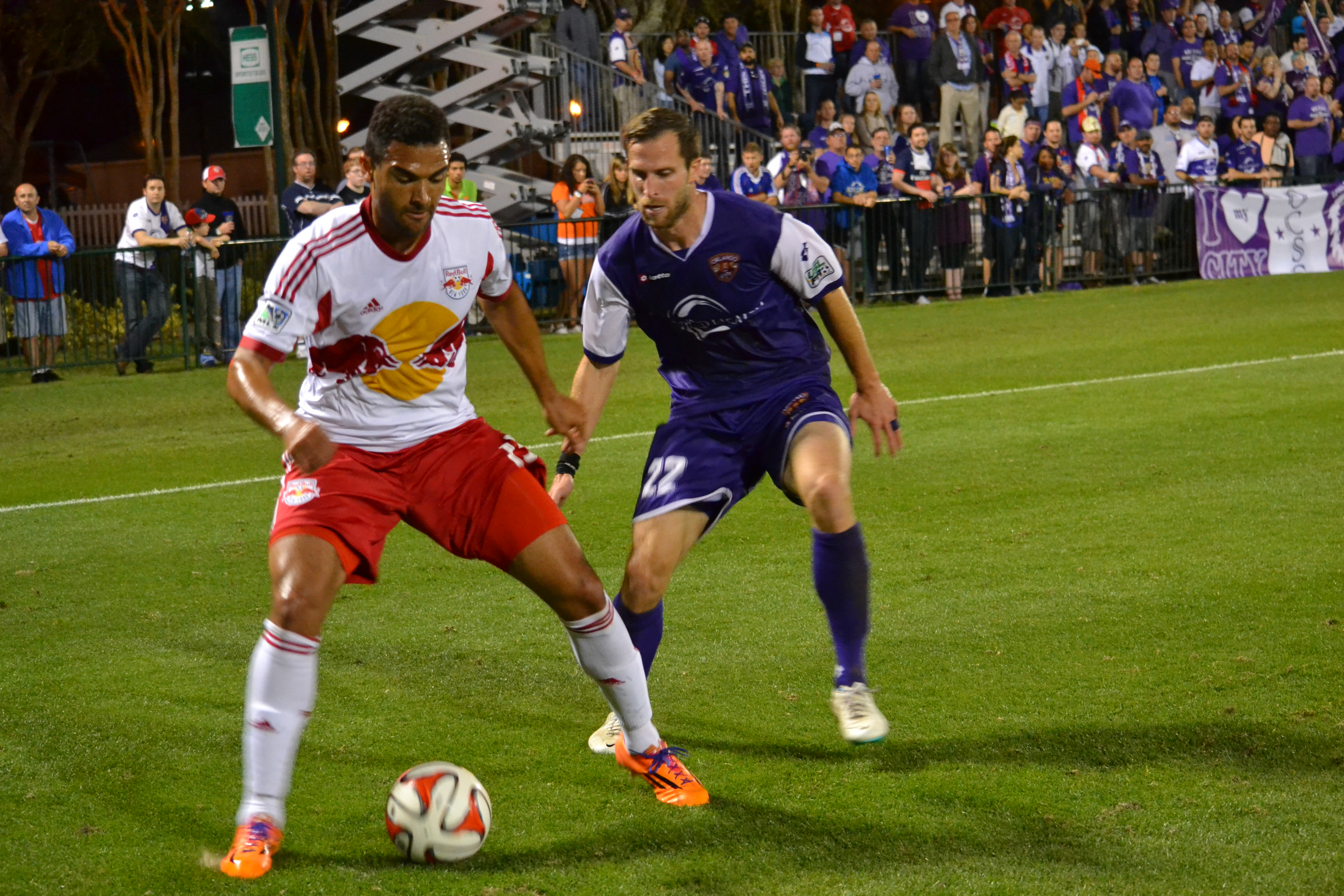
Rob Valentino appeared for the club in the 2008 U.S. Open Cup and the 2008-09 CONCACAF Champions League.

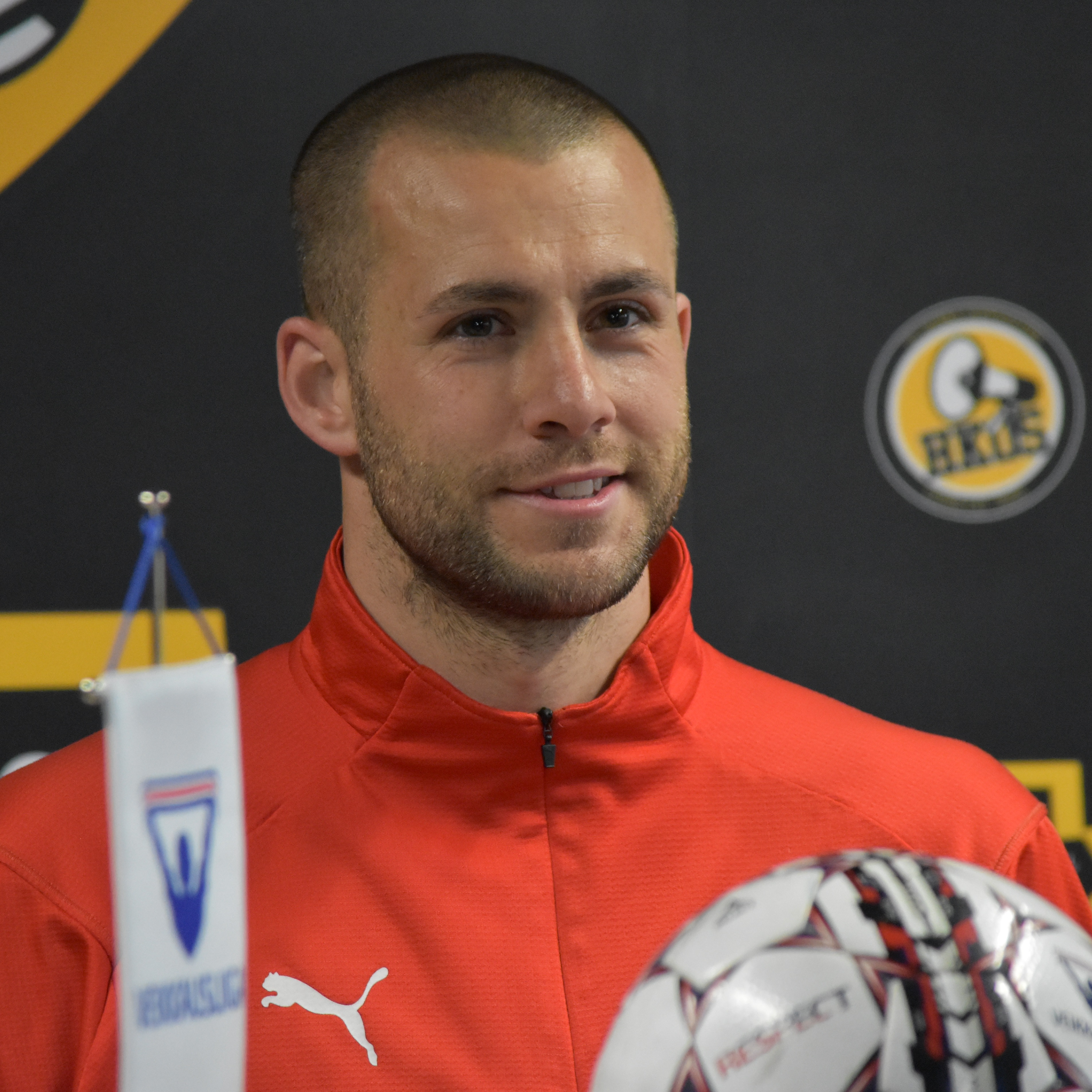
Tim Murray appeared for the club in the 2011 U.S. Open Cup.

Name	Position	Country	Years	Competitions	Notes
Michael Augustine	MF	NGA	2011	2011 US Open Cup	
Gilberto Flores	MF	BRA	2005	2005 US Open Cup	
Kyle Helton	DF	USA	2007	2007 US Open Cup	
Alan Koger	FW	USA	2011	2011 US Open Cup	
Gabe Latigue	MF	USA	2013	2013 US Open Cup	
Otto Loewy	DF	LBR	2011	2011 US Open Cup	
Chris Loftus	FW	USA	2007	2007 US Open Cup	
Brandon Manzonelli	MF	USA	2008	2008-09 CONCACAF Champions League	
Jordan McCrary	DF	USA	2015	2015 US Open Cup	
Tim Murray	GK	USA	2011	2011 US Open Cup	
Michael Roach	MF	USA	2012	2012 US Open Cup	
Tyler Rudy	MF	USA	2015	2015 US Open Cup	
Nicolás Samayoa	DF	GUA	2018	2018 US Open Cup	
Andrew Sousa	MF	USA	2011	2011 US Open Cup	
Alec Sundly	MF	USA	2014	2014 US Open Cup	
Brandon Tyler	MF	USA	2008	2008 US Open Cup, 2008 North American SuperLiga	
Rob Valentino	DF	USA	2008	2008 US Open Cup, 2008-09 CONCACAF Champions League	
