= Alex Caceres (footballer) =

Colombian footballer (born 1987)

John Alex Caceres
Personal information
- Full name: John Alexander Caceres Quintero
- Date of birth: July 5, 1987 (age 39)
- Place of birth: Medellin, Colombia
- Height: 1.76 m (5 ft 9 in)
- Position: Winger

Team information
- Current team: Tacoma Stars
- Number: 7

College career
Years	Team	Apps	(Gls)
2007–2008	Taft College Cougars		

Senior career*
Years	Team	Apps	(Gls)
2009	Sevilla FC Puerto Rico		
2012–2013	Fresno Fuego	18	(9)
2012	Cal FC		
2012–2013	Toros Mexico (indoor)	5	(14)
2013	Atlanta Silverbacks	10	(0)
2013–2014	Las Vegas Legends (indoor)	13	(25)
2014–2015	Monterrey Flash (indoor)	13	(10)
2015–2016	Las Vegas Legends (indoor)	18	(10)
2016–2017	Ontario Fury (indoor)	16	(5)
2017	El Paso Coyotes (indoor)	10	(3)
2018	Ontario Fury (indoor)	6	(0)
2018–2019	El Paso Coyotes (indoor)	18	(4)
2019–	Tacoma Stars (indoor)	57	(19)
- * Club domestic league appearances and goals as of 18 December 2022

John Alexander Caceres Quintero (born July 5, 1987) is a Colombian footballer who plays for the Tacoma Stars in the Major Arena Soccer League.

== Career ==
On August 2, 2013, Caceres signed a professional contract with NASL club Atlanta Silverbacks.
