= Mike Lookingland =

American soccer defender (born 1983)

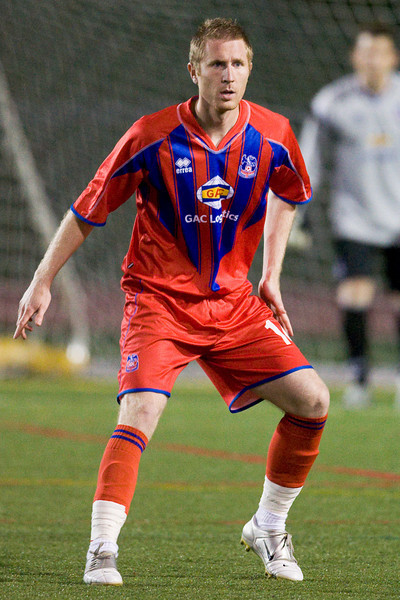

Personal information
- Full name: Michael Lookingland II
- Date of birth: 13 September 1983 (age 43)
- Place of birth: Fallston, Maryland, U.S.
- Height: 6 ft 1 in (1.85 m)
- Positions: Defender; midfielder

Team information
- Current team: Christos

College career
Years	Team	Apps	(Gls)
2001–2004	Bucknell Bison		

Senior career*
Years	Team	Apps	(Gls)
2003–2004	Chesapeake Dragons	21	(1)
2005–2006	Real Salt Lake	1	(0)
2005–2014	Baltimore Blast (indoor)	198	(80)
2007	Harrisburg City Islanders	17	(2)
2008	Crystal Palace Baltimore	15	(1)
2014–2015	Milwaukee Wave (indoor)	11	(0)

Managerial career
- 2012: Baltimore Bohemians (assistant)
- 2019–2021: FC Baltimore Christos (assistant)
- 2021–: Christos FC (League Two)
- * Club domestic league appearances and goals as of 15 March 2019

Mike Lookingland (born 13 September 1983) is an American soccer defender who played for the Milwaukee Wave of the Major Arena Soccer League in the 2014–2015 season. He was the 2012 Major Indoor Soccer League Defender of the Year.

== Player ==
Lookingland graduated from Loyola Blakefield. He attended Bucknell University, playing on the men's soccer team from 2001 to 2004. He was a 2004 Third Team All American. In 2003 and 2004, he played for the Chesapeake Dragons of the Premier Development League during the collegiate off season. On 4 February 2005, Real Salt Lake selected Lookingland in the second round (thirteenth overall) of the 2005 MLS Supplemental Draft. He spent two seasons in Salt Lake. In 2007, he moved to the Harrisburg City Islanders of the USL Second Division. In 2008, he played for Crystal Palace Baltimore. In addition to his outdoor career, Lookingland has an extensive indoor career. In 2005, he signed with the Baltimore Blast. He was named to the 2005–2006 All Rookie team and was the 2012 Major Indoor Soccer League Defender of the Year.

== Coach ==
On 4 April 2012, the Baltimore Bohemians hired Lookingland as an assistant coach.

On December 13, 2021, Lookingland was named head coach for Christos FC's USL League Two team ahead of their first season in the league.

== Career statistics ==
(correct as of 27 September 2008)

Club	Season	League			Cup			Play-Offs			Total		
Club	Season	Apps	Goals	Assists	Apps	Goals	Assists	Apps	Goals	Assists	Apps	Goals	Assists
Real Salt Lake	2005	1	0	0	-	-	-	-	-	-	1	0	0
Crystal Palace Baltimore	2008	15	1	0	4	0	0	2	0	0	21	1	0
Total	2008–present	15	1	0	4	0	0	2	0	0	21	1	0
Career Total	2005–present	16	1	0	4	0	0	2	0	0	22	1	0

== Personal life ==
Lookingland is of Scottish descent and is a keen Motherwell F.C. supporter.
