= Noah Merl =

Former American soccer player, current clinical therapist and sport psychology consultant

Personal information
- Full name: Noah Merl
- Date of birth: June 4, 1983 (age 43)
- Place of birth: Walnut Creek, California, U.S.
- Height: 6 ft 0 in (1.83 m)
- Position: Midfielder

Youth career
- 2001–2004: California Golden Bears

Senior career*
Years	Team	Apps	(Gls)
2004	Orange County Blue Star		
2005	San Jose Earthquakes	0	(0)
2006–2008	Seattle Sounders	65	(0)
- * Club domestic league appearances and goals as of 30 May 2009

Noah Merl (born June 4, 1983) is a psychotherapist for athletes and performers throughout the state of California. Noah is an American former professional soccer player, who played collegiate soccer at the University of California, Berkeley, and professionally for the Seattle Sounders. After retiring in 2008, he pursued a career in psychotherapy, attending graduate school at the University of Maryland, Baltimore. Noah then returned to California where he continues to work as a Licensed Clinical Social Worker while living with his wife and 3 children. In 2022 Noah started Athletic Acumen, his own private practice specializing in psychotherapy services specifically for elite athletes and performers.

== Career ==
=== College and amateur ===
Merl attended the University of California, Berkeley where he played college soccer from 2001 to 2004 and was captain his last 2 years. During the 2004 collegiate off season, he spent the summer with Orange County Blue Star of the USL Premier Development League. During his final game with Cal, in the NCAA tournament at Southern Methodist University, Noah tore his PCL in his left knee, leading to a year-long recovery.

=== Professional ===
Merl was drafted in the third round (29th overall) of the 2005 MLS Supplemental Draft by the San Jose Earthquakes despite being injured, though he never played a first team game with the team, playing three games with their reserves before being released at the end of the season.

On April 10, 2006, he signed with Seattle Sounders of the USL First Division, and spent the next three seasons with the team, playing 21 games in his first season, and finishing his career there with 65 appearances. Noah represented the United States at the 2007 FIFA Beach Soccer World Cup in Rio de Janeiro, Brazil.

Following the demise of the USL1-1 Sounders at the end of 2008, Merl retired from professional soccer and pursued a career as a mental health therapist, currently licensed in California.

== Honors ==
=== Seattle Sounders ===
- USL First Division Championship (1): 2007
- USL First Division Commissioner's Cup (1): 2007
