= 2005 MLS supplemental draft =

College draft for soccer teams

Following the signature of the first MLS players' union contract, the MLS Superdraft was limited to four rounds. As a result, the Supplemental Draft was re-incarnated to hold the additional rounds. The 2005 MLS supplemental draft, held on February 4, 2005, was the first re-incarnation of the MLS supplemental draft. The four-round event followed January's 2005 MLS SuperDraft, as teams filled out their developmental rosters. Expansion clubs Real Salt Lake and Chivas USA received the first picks in each round.

The most notable draft picks include fourth round draft picks Chris Wondolowski, who is one of the top career goalscorers in Major League Soccer with over 140 career MLS goals, and Jeff Larentowicz, who has played more than 380 matches in more than 10 seasons in Major League Soccer.

| * | Denotes player who has been selected for an MLS Best XI team |

== Round 1 ==
| Pick # | MLS team | Player | Pos | Affiliation |
|---|---|---|---|---|
| 1 | Real Salt Lake | Steven Rhyne | M | Clemson University |
| 2 | Chivas USA | Javier Barragan | GK | Cal State Dominguez Hills |
| 3 | Chicago Fire | Justin Cook | F | Ohio State University |
| 4 | FC Dallas (Note: #4: FC Dallas → D.C. United → FC Dallas. 23 June 2004: FC Dallas acquired this first-round pick, originally a fifth-round selection in the 2005 MLS SuperDraft, and future considerations from D.C. United in exchange for defender Ezra Hendrickson. When the 2005 SuperDraft was reduced to four rounds, Dallas received this first-round selection in the 2005 Supplemental Draft from D.C. to complete the trade. On 30 April 2004, D.C. has acquired this pick, originally "future considerations", from FC Dallas in exchange for defender Milton Reyes.) | Kevin Wilson | M | University of San Diego |
| 5 | San Jose Earthquakes | Brett Rodriguez | D | Creighton University |
| 6 | MetroStars | Jason Hernandez | D | Seton Hall University |
| 7 | Colorado Rapids | Sasha Gotsmanov | F | University of Rhode Island |
| 8 | Columbus Crew | Matt Oliver | D | University of Virginia |
| 9 | Columbus Crew (Note: #9: New England Revolution → Columbus Crew. 24 April 2004: Columbus Crew acquired this first-round pick, originally a fifth-round selection in the 2005 MLS SuperDraft, from New England Revolution in exchange for midfielder Luke Vercollone. When the 2005 SuperDraft was reduced to four rounds, Columbus received this first-round selection in the 2005 Supplemental Draft from New England to complete the trade.) | Bill Gaudette | GK | St. John's University |
| 10 | Los Angeles Galaxy | Benjamin Benditson | D | Cal State Northridge |
| 11 | Kansas City Wizards | Edwin Ruiz | F | Hartwick College |
| 12 | D.C. United | Matt Nickell | F | Drake University |

== Round 2 ==
| Pick # | MLS team | Player | Pos | Affiliation |
|---|---|---|---|---|
| 13 | Real Salt Lake | Mike Lookingland | D | Bucknell University |
| 14 | Chivas USA | Helmis Matute | M | Virginia Commonwealth University |
| 15 | Chicago Fire | David Mahoney | GK | Cornell University |
| 16 | FC Dallas | Abe Thompson | F | University of Maryland |
| 17 | New England Revolution (Note: #17: San Jose Earthquakes → New England Revolution. 8 April 2004: New England Revolution acquired this second-round pick, originally a conditional MLS SuperDraft selection, from San Jose Earthquakes in exchange for forward Chris Brown.) | Jamie Holmes | F | Birmingham–Southern College |
| 18 | San Jose Earthquakes (Note: #18: MetroStars → San Jose Earthquakes. 16 January 2004: San Jose Earthquakes acquired this second-round pick, originally a sixth-round selection in the 2005 MLS SuperDraft, from MetroStars in exchange for a sixth-round selection in the 2004 MLS SuperDraft. When the 2005 SuperDraft was reduced to four rounds, San Jose received this second-round selection in the 2005 Supplemental Draft from MetroStars to complete the trade.) | Robby Fulton | GK | Stanford University |
| 19 | Los Angeles Galaxy (Note: #19: Colorado Rapids → Los Angeles Galaxy. 31 August 2004: Los Angeles Galaxy acquired this second-round pick, originally a sixth-round selection in the 2005 MLS SuperDraft, from Colorado Rapids in exchange for defender Ricky Lewis. When the 2005 SuperDraft was reduced to four rounds, Los Angeles received this second-round selection in the 2005 Supplemental Draft from Colorado to complete the trade.) | Drew McAthy | F | UC Santa Barbara |
| 20 | Columbus Crew | Eric Vasquez | M | University of Central Florida |
| 21 | New England Revolution | Ryan Latham | F | Southern Methodist University |
| 22 | Los Angeles Galaxy | Matt Kovar | D | Loyola Marymount University |
| 23 | FC Dallas (Note: #23: Kansas City Wizards → FC Dallas. 24 February 2003: FC Dallas acquired this second-round pick, originally a conditional selection in the 2005 MLS SuperDraft, from Kansas City Wizards in exchange for defender Lee Morrison.) | Aaron Pitchkolan | D | West Virginia University |
| 24 | FC Dallas (Note: #24: D.C. United → FC Dallas. 23 July 2004: FC Dallas acquired this pick, originally "future considerations", and a fourth-round selection in the 2006 MLS SuperDraft from D.C. United in exchange for forward Jason Thompson.) | Drew Cavanagh | D | College of Charleston |

== Round 3 ==
| Pick # | MLS team | Player | Position | Affiliation |
|---|---|---|---|---|
| 25 | Real Salt Lake | Noah Palmer | GK | University of Maryland |
| 26 | Chivas USA | Mike Munoz | M | University of California |
| 27 | Chicago Fire | Chris Karcz | M | Rutgers University |
| 28 | FC Dallas | Christopher Schwarze | D | University of San Francisco |
| 29 | San Jose Earthquakes | Noah Merl | D | University of California |
| 30 | MetroStars | Patrick Hannigan | GK | Temple University |
| 31 | Colorado Rapids | Eugene Sepuya | F | Alabama A&M University |
| 32 | Columbus Crew | Ryan Kelly | D | St. John's University |
| 33 | New England Revolution | Easton Wilson | M | University of Connecticut |
| 34 | Los Angeles Galaxy | Ryan Shaw | F | University of California, Davis |
| 35 | Kansas City Wizards | Doug Lascody | M | Southwest Missouri State University |
| 36 | D.C. United | Andrew Terris | GK | Stanford University |

=== Round 3 trades ===
No trades reported.

== Round 4 ==
| Pick # | MLS team | Player | Pos | Affiliation |
|---|---|---|---|---|
| 37 | Real Salt Lake | Cameron Knowles | D | University of Akron |
| 38 | Chivas USA | Dan Kennedy | GK | UC Santa Barbara |
| 39 | Chicago Fire | Hollis Ryan Donaldson | D | Liberty University |
| 40 | FC Dallas | Sammy Tamporello | M | Ohio State University |
| 41 | San Jose Earthquakes | Chris Wondolowski | M | Chico State University |
| 42 | MetroStars | Usiel Vasquez | F | Southern Connecticut State |
| 43 | Colorado Rapids | Dan Gargan | D | Georgetown University |
| 44 | Columbus Crew | Chris Lee | F | Marquette University |
| 45 | New England Revolution | Jeff Larentowicz | D | Brown University |
| 46 | Los Angeles Galaxy | Jeremiah Gallegos | F | University of Cincinnati |
| 47 | Kansas City Wizards | Ryan Caugherty | D | Wake Forest University |
| 48 | D.C. United | Shawn Kuykendall | M | American University |

=== Round 4 trades ===
No trades reported.

== Trade Note ==
- On 1 February 2005, MetroStars acquired a draft pick and an allocation from Real Salt Lake in exchange for defender Eddie Pope. MetroStars had the choice of swapping first-round selections in the 2005 Supplemental Draft with Real Salt Lake or taking the highest RSL second-round pick in the 2006 MLS SuperDraft. MetroStars chose the latter.
