= Craig Tornberg =

Football executive

Personal details
- Born: Craig Tornberg Burbank, California, United States
- Occupation: Sports Consultant

Craig Tornberg (born in California) is the managing director for Boston City FC. Between 2002 and 2013, he was the Vice-President and General Manager of New England Revolution Major League Soccer and former President of Oxford City F.C.

== Education ==
He speaks Spanish, English and Portuguese.

== Career ==
Having joined the organization after the launch of Major League Soccer in 1995. Tornberg has more than 30 years of sales, marketing, management and entrepreneurial experience, including extensive work at all levels of soccer in this country. Serving as General Manager of New England Revolution of the MLS from 2004 to 2008, Tornberg developed and maintained many of the relationships between the club and New England's ethnic communities and has been honored extensively for his commitment to the Spanish- and Portuguese-speaking communities in the region. He was officially named the Revolution's General Manager on December 16, 2003. Tornberg has been the only sports executive to be named to El Planeta Newspaper's list of 100 most influential people in the New England Hispanic community in each of the last four years. In 2005, Tornberg was honored at the Massachusetts State House for his efforts within the Caribbean-American community. Tornberg also pioneered corporate sponsorship of the team's preseason team training tours, having arranged relationships to bring the team to Brazil, Bermuda, Costa Rica, Mexico, Ecuador, the Azores and several domestic locations. With the League's launch in 1996, Tornberg's sales efforts established some of the highest ticket sales numbers in MLS history. He was the recipient of several league awards including the 2000 Salesperson of the Year and 2001 Top Group Sales Executive. Tornberg serves on the Board of Directors of America SCORES New England and Project GOAL, two youth soccer and literacy after-school programs.

== Personal life ==
Tornberg and his wife, Elena, live north of Boston, and have two sons Jordi and Paolo. Jordi currently plays for Barça Residency Academy’s U-17 team and Paolo plays for the New England Revolution Academy. Craig also has a daughter, Dr. Stephanie Tornberg.
