= Brandon Manzonelli =

American soccer player

Personal information
- Date of birth: December 23, 1989 (age 36)
- Place of birth: St. Louis, Missouri, United States
- Height: 5 ft 8 in (1.73 m)
- Position: Midfielder

Youth career
- 2006–2008: Villarreal

Senior career*
Years	Team	Apps	(Gls)
2008	New England Revolution	0	(0)
2013	Atlanta Silverbacks	0	(0)
2014	St. Louis Ambush (indoor)	6	(1)
2014	Springfield Demize	2	(0)

International career^{‡}
2008	United States U20	4	(0)
- * Club domestic league appearances and goals as of 21 May 2014 ‡ National team caps and goals as of 9 August 2009

Brandon Manzonelli (born December 23, 1989, in St. Louis, Missouri) is an American soccer player.

== Club career ==
Manzonelli signed with Spanish club Villarreal CF in 2006 at the age of 16, and played 25 games with the club's U-18 team, recording eight goals and 10 assists, as well as playing three games with Villarreal's reserves.

After trialling with Manchester City and Blackburn Rovers of the Premier League, Manzonelli signed with the New England Revolution in early 2008. He made his full professional debut for the Revolution on July 1, 2008, as a second-half substitute in a U.S. Open Cup third-round game against Richmond Kickers.

After his release by New England, Manzonelli trialed with numerous clubs in Europe, including teams from Italy, Spain, Germany, Denmark, Scotland and England. However, he failed to earn a contract due to citizenship issues. Manzonelli finally returned to soccer when he signed for NASL club Atlanta Silverbacks on March 21, 2013.

== International career ==
He was called in by Thomas Rongen for the United States under-20 team for a friendly against Mexico on July 11, 2008, and recorded two assists in the 3–0 victory. Manzonelli played in the Milk Cup in Northern Ireland last July/August with the U-20 USA against Belgium, Northern Ireland, and Wales and got an assist against Wales.
