= Jamie Holmes (soccer) =

American soccer player

Personal information
- Full name: Jamie Reid Holmes
- Date of birth: April 4, 1983 (age 43)
- Place of birth: Springfield, Virginia, United States
- Height: 6 ft 1 in (1.85 m)
- Position: Forward

Youth career
- 2001–2004: Birmingham Southern Panthers

Senior career*
Years	Team	Apps	(Gls)
2005	New England Revolution	1	(0)
2007–2008	Wilmington Hammerheads	24	(9)
2007	→ Rochester Rhinos (loan)	4	(1)
2008	→ Charleston Battery (loan)	1	(0)
2009	Real Maryland Monarchs	11	(3)
- * Club domestic league appearances and goals as of 12 April 2009

Jamie Holmes (born April 4, 1983, in Jacksonville, Florida) is an American soccer player. He concluded his career playing for Real Maryland Monarchs in the USL Second Division.

== Career ==
=== College ===
Holmes played college soccer at Birmingham–Southern College from 2001 to 2004.

=== Professional ===
Holmes was drafted in the second round (seventeenth overall) in the 2005 MLS Supplemental Draft by New England Revolution, but despite featuring heavily for the Revs in the MLS Reserve Division, played just one game in Major League Soccer - a 1–1 tie with the Kansas City Wizards on June 4, 2005 - before being waived on November 16, 2005. He appears not to have played professionally in 2006.

In the spring of 2007, Holmes signed with the Wilmington Hammerheads of the USL Second Division, and spent two years playing with the team. He had two loan spells in the USL First Division - one in July 2007 with the Rochester Rhinos, and one in August 2008 with the Charleston Battery, before signing with the Real Maryland Monarchs in 2009.
