= Gilberto Flores =

Gilberto Flores may refer to:

- Gilberto Flores (footballer, born 1983), full name Gilberto Joao Flores, Brazilian football midfielder
- Gilberto Flores (footballer, born 2003), full name Gilberto Ivan Flores Melgarejo, Paraguayan football defender
