= 2010 MLS expansion draft =

Player draft for MLS teams

2010 MLS Expansion Draft

General information
- Date(s): November 24, 2010

Overview
- Expansion teams: Vancouver Whitecaps FC; Portland Timbers
- Expansion season: 2011

The 2010 MLS Expansion Draft took place on November 24, 2010, and was a special draft for the Major League Soccer expansion teams Vancouver Whitecaps FC and Portland Timbers.

== Format ==
- Portland Timbers selected first, Vancouver Whitecaps FC picked second, and the two alternated picks thereafter.
- Existing teams were allowed to protect 11 players from their rosters. Generation Adidas players were automatically protected, though players who graduated from the program to the senior roster at the end of the 2010 season were not.
- After each player was selected, his team was allowed to remove one exposed player from their list.
- Any developmental players selected were required to move up to the senior roster for the 2011 season.

== Expansion Draft Results ==
Pick	MLS Team	Player	Previous Team
1	Portland Timbers	Dax McCarty	FC Dallas
2	Vancouver Whitecaps FC	Sanna Nyassi	Seattle Sounders FC
3	Portland Timbers	Eric Brunner	Columbus Crew
4	Vancouver Whitecaps FC	Atiba Harris	FC Dallas
5	Portland Timbers	Adam Moffat	Columbus Crew
6	Vancouver Whitecaps FC	Nathan Sturgis	Seattle Sounders FC
7	Portland Timbers	Anthony Wallace	Colorado Rapids
8	Vancouver Whitecaps FC	Shea Salinas	Philadelphia Union
9	Portland Timbers	David Horst	Real Salt Lake
10	Vancouver Whitecaps FC	Alan Gordon	Chivas USA
11	Portland Timbers	Robbie Findley	Real Salt Lake
12	Vancouver Whitecaps FC	O'Brian White	Toronto FC
13	Portland Timbers	Peter Lowry	Chicago Fire
14	Vancouver Whitecaps FC	Alejandro Moreno	Philadelphia Union
15	Portland Timbers	Jonathan Bornstein	Chivas USA
16	Vancouver Whitecaps FC	Joe Cannon	San Jose Earthquakes
17	Portland Timbers	Jordan Graye	D.C. United
18	Vancouver Whitecaps FC	Jonathan Leathers	Sporting Kansas City
19	Portland Timbers	Arturo Alvarez	San Jose Earthquakes
20	Vancouver Whitecaps FC	John Thorrington	Chicago Fire

== Team-by-team breakdown ==
=== Chicago Fire ===
Exposed	Protected	Exempt
Nery Castillo	Mike Banner	Corben Bone
Andrew Dykstra	Calen Carr	Sean Johnson
Collins John	Wilman Conde, Jr.	Victor Pineda
Krzysztof Król	Baggio Husidić	
Freddie Ljungberg	Steven Kinney	
Peter Lowry	Patrick Nyarko	
Dasan Robinson	Marco Pappa	
John Thorrington	Logan Pause	
Deris Umanzor	Bratislav Ristić	
	Gonzalo Segares	
	Kwame Watson-Siriboe	

=== Chivas USA ===
Exposed	Protected	Exempt
Carlos Borja	Justin Braun	Bryan de la Fuente
Jonathan Bornstein	Yamith Cuesta	Blair Gavin
Chukwudi Chijindu	Darío Delgado	César Zamora
Rodolfo Espinoza	Jorge Flores	
Maykel Galindo	Ante Jazić	
Alan Gordon	Michael Lahoud	
Dan Kennedy	Paulo Nagamura	
Eduardo Lillingston	Zach Thornton	
Giancarlo Maldonado	Michael Umaña	
Gerson Mayen	Ben Zemanski	
Jesús Padilla	Sal Zizzo	
Osael Romero		
Marcelo Saragosa		
Mariano Trujillo		
Alex Zotincă		

=== Colorado Rapids ===
Exposed	Protected	Exempt
Andre Akpan	Conor Casey	Davy Armstrong
Quincy Amarikwa	Omar Cummings	
Steward Ceus	Macoumba Kandji	
Ian Joyce	Kosuke Kimura	
Ross LaBauex	Jeff Larentowicz	
Claudio López	Pablo Mastroeni	
Ciaran O'Brien	Drew Moor	
Scott Palguta	Brian Mullan	
Ross Schunk	Matt Pickens	
Wells Thompson	Jamie Smith	
Peter Vagenas	Marvell Wynne	
Anthony Wallace		

=== Columbus Crew ===
Exposed	Protected	Exempt
Guillermo Barros Schelotto	Emmanuel Ekpo	Dilly Duka
Eric Brunner	Shaun Francis	
Kevin Burns	Eddie Gaven	
Jason Garey	William Hesmer	
Léandre Griffit	Andy Iro	
Andy Gruenebaum	Steven Lenhart	
Frankie Hejduk	Chad Marshall	
Adam Moffat	Andrés Mendoza	
Duncan Oughton	Danny O'Rourke	
Gino Padula	Emilio Rentería	
Josh Williams	Robbie Rogers	

=== D.C. United ===
Exposed	Protected	Exempt
Danny Allsopp	Branko Bošković	Bill Hamid
Brandon Barklage	Marc Burch	Andy Najar
Adam Cristman	Junior Carreiro	Conor Shanosky
Jordan Graye	Dejan Jakovic	
Pablo Hernández	Julius James	
Devon McTavish	Stephen King	
Jaime Moreno	Santino Quaranta	
Kurt Morsink	Chris Pontius	
Juan Manuel Peña	Clyde Simms	
Troy Perkins	Rodney Wallace	
Barry Rice	Jed Zayner	
Carlos Varela		

=== FC Dallas ===
Exposed	Protected	Exempt
Eric Avila	Eric Alexander	Moises Hernandez
Jeff Cunningham	Jair Benítez	Josh Lambo
Kyle Davies	Marvin Chávez	Bryan Leyva
Edson Edward	David Ferreira	Rubén Luna
Bruno Guarda	Kevin Hartman	Peri Marošević
Atiba Harris	Ugo Ihemelu	Victor Ulloa
Daniel Hernández	Jackson	Andrew Wiedeman
Dax McCarty	George John	
Milton Rodríguez	Zach Loyd	
Darío Sala	Heath Pearce	
Jason Yeisley	Brek Shea	

=== Houston Dynamo ===
Exposed	Protected	Exempt
Samuel Appiah	Bobby Boswell	Danny Cruz
Corey Ashe	Geoff Cameron	Tyler Deric
Ryan Cochrane	Mike Chabala	Francisco Navas
Richard Mulrooney	Brian Ching	
Joseph Ngwenya	Colin Clark	
Anthony Obodai	Brad Davis	
Dominic Oduro	André Hainault	
Pat Onstad	Tally Hall	
Eddie Robinson	Lovel Palmer	
	Adrian Serioux	
	Cam Weaver	

=== Los Angeles Galaxy ===
Exposed	Protected	Exempt
Gregg Berhalter	David Beckham	Tristan Bowen
Alex Cazumba	Chris Birchall	
Bryan Jordan	Edson Buddle	
Jovan Kirovski	A. J. DeLaGarza	
Dema Kovalenko	Landon Donovan	
Leonardo	Todd Dunivant	
Mike Magee	Sean Franklin	
Yohance Marshall	Omar Gonzalez	
Brian Perk	Juninho	
Josh Saunders	Donovan Ricketts	
	Michael Stephens	

=== New England Revolution ===
Exposed	Protected	Exempt
Zak Boggs	Kevin Alston	Diego Fagúndez
Preston Burpo	Darrius Barnes	
Nico Colaluca	Shalrie Joseph	
Kheli Dube	Kenny Mansally	
Cory Gibbs	Sainey Nyassi	
Jason Griffiths	Emmanuel Osei	
Roberto Linck	Marko Perović	
Tim Murray	Matt Reis	
Pat Phelan	Zack Schilawski	
Seth Sinovic	Bobby Shuttleworth	
Khano Smith	Chris Tierney	
Ilija Stolica		

=== New York Red Bulls ===
Exposed	Protected	Exempt
Juan Pablo Ángel	Chris Albright	Juan Agudelo
Andrew Boyens	Mehdi Ballouchy	Giorgi Chirgadze
Conor Chinn	Danleigh Borman	Tony Tchani
Austin da Luz	Bouna Coundoul	
Irving Garcia	Thierry Henry	
Salou Ibrahim	Joel Lindpere	
Brian Nielsen	Rafael Márquez	
Carl Robinson	Carlos Mendes	
Luke Sassano	Roy Miller	
Greg Sutton	Tim Ream	
Carey Talley	Dane Richards	
Siniša Ubiparipović		

=== Philadelphia Union ===
Exposed	Protected	Exempt
Cristian Arrieta	Danny Califf	Jack McInerney
Eduardo Coudet	Brian Carroll	Danny Mwanga
Fred	Juan Diego González	Amobi Okugo
Andrew Jacobson	Jordan Harvey	
Brad Knighton	Sébastien Le Toux	
Stefani Miglioranzi	Justin Mapp	
Alejandro Moreno	Kyle Nakazawa	
J. T. Noone	Michael Orozco Fiscal	
Shea Salinas	Toni Ståhl	
Chris Seitz	Roger Torres	
Nick Zimmerman	Sheanon Williams	

=== Real Salt Lake ===
Exposed	Protected	Exempt
Jean Alexandre	Paulo Araujo Jr.	Luis Gil
Pablo Campos	Kyle Beckerman	
Robbie Findley	Tony Beltran	
Nelson González	Nat Borchers	
Ned Grabavoy	Fabián Espíndola	
David Horst	Will Johnson	
Rauwshan McKenzie	Javier Morales	
Tim Melia	Jámison Olave	
Alex Nimo	Nick Rimando	
Robbie Russell	Álvaro Saborío	
Kyle Reynish	Chris Wingert	
Chris Schuler		
Collen Warner		
Andy Williams		

=== San Jose Earthquakes ===
Exposed	Protected	Exempt
Arturo Alvarez	Jon Busch	Ike Opara
Steven Beitashour	Bobby Convey	
Bobby Burling	Sam Cronin	
Joe Cannon	Joey Gjertsen	
Ramiro Corrales	Jason Hernandez	
Eduardo	Omar Jasseh	
Geovanni	Ryan Johnson	
Cornell Glen	Brandon McDonald	
Chris Leitch	Scott Sealy	
André Luiz	Khari Stephenson	
Justin Morrow	Chris Wondolowski	
Brad Ring		
Tim Ward		

=== Seattle Sounders FC ===
Exposed	Protected	Exempt
Julien Baudet	Osvaldo Alonso	
Terry Boss	Brad Evans	
Danny Earls	Michael Fucito	
David Estrada	Álvaro Fernández	
Leonardo González	Jhon Kennedy Hurtado	
Taylor Graham	Nate Jaqua	
Patrick Ianni	Kasey Keller	
Roger Levesque	Fredy Montero	
Tyrone Marshall	Jeff Parke	
Miguel Montaño	James Riley	
Blaise Nkufo	Steve Zakuani	
Pat Noonan		
Sanna Nyassi		
Zach Scott		
Mike Seamon		
Nathan Sturgis		
Tyson Wahl		

=== Sporting Kansas City ===
Exposed	Protected	Exempt
Olukorede Aiyegbusi	Davy Arnaud	Teal Bunbury
Jamar Beasley	Stéphane Auvray	Jon Kempin
Sunil Chhetri	Matt Besler	
Jimmy Conrad	Roger Espinoza	
Birahim Diop	Michael Harrington	
Zoltán Hercegfalvi	Jack Jewsbury	
Aaron Hohlbein	Kei Kamara	
Nikos Kounenakis	Jimmy Nielsen	
Eric Kronberg	Craig Rocastle	
Jonathan Leathers	Ryan Smith	
Chance Myers	Graham Zusi	
Shavar Thomas		
Josh Wolff		

=== Toronto FC ===
Exposed	Protected	Exempt
Chad Barrett	Nana Attakora	Doneil Henry
Julian de Guzman	Adrian Cann	Nicholas Lindsay
Gabe Gala	Jon Conway	
Nick Garcia	Dwayne De Rosario	
Raivis Hščanovičs	Stefan Frei	
Fuad Ibrahim	Dan Gargan	
Miloš Kočić	Emmanuel Gómez	
Mista	Ty Harden	
Joseph Nane	Nick LaBrocca	
Amadou Sanyang	Jacob Peterson	
Martin Šarić	Maicon Santos	
Maxim Usanov		
O'Brian White		
