= 2010 New England Revolution season =

New England Revolution
2010 season
- Owner: Robert Kraft
- Coach: Steve Nicol
- Major League Soccer: 13th
- U.S. Open Cup: Qualification Semifinals
- Superliga: Runner-up
- Top goalscorer: League: Marko Perović (6); All: Marko Perović (8)
Home colors	Away colors

The 2010 New England Revolution season was the fifteenth season of the team's existence. The regular season began on March 27, 2010 with a 1–0 loss to the LA Galaxy and ended on October 21 with a 2–0 loss at the New York Red Bulls.

After their 2–2 draw with the Columbus Crew on September 25, the Revs were officially eliminated from playoff contention. It was the first time the Revs failed to qualify for the playoffs since Steve Nicol became coach in 2002.

== Background ==
The Revs finished the 2009 season third in the Eastern Conference and seventh overall, qualifying for the playoffs as a wild card. After defeating the Chicago Fire 2–1 in the first leg of their playoff series, they lost the second leg 2–0 and failed to advance.

Much of the offseason was spent trying to fill the holes created by the departures of veterans Jay Heaps and Steve Ralston. The former retired and eventually became a part of the Revs broadcast team. The latter joined newly formed AC St. Louis in the Division 2 Pro League. These holes were filled primarily through the draft and a trade that sent Wells Thompson and Jeff Larentowicz to the Colorado Rapids in exchange for defender Cory Gibbs and Goalkeeper Preston Burpo.

For 2010, the Revs also signed Senegalese midfielder Joseph Niouky and Serbian midfielder Marko Perovic and released Costa Rican defender Gabriel Badilla.

== Review ==
=== Preseason ===
The Revs began training for the 2010 Major League Soccer season on February 1, 2010 inside the Dana Farber Fieldhouse at Gillette Stadium, the same indoor practice facility used by the New England Patriots. The team did most of its preparations for the season in Foxborough, but took two preseason road trips, one to Orlando in February, and the other to North Carolina in March.

In Orlando, the Revs played their first two preseason games of the year. On February 23, they lost to FC Dallas 2–0 on goals from Atiba Harris and Marvin Chávez. Two days later they got a much better result against a team of Florida College All-stars, winning 6–0.

The Revs' stay in North Carolina was longer than their Orlando trip. After arriving on March 10, the team spent 12 days in the state, playing three preseason games in the process. The first game saw the Revs defeat the Charlotte Eagles 2–0 on goals from Kheli Dube and Zack Schilawski. Next the team faced Duke University in a game that ended in a 1–1 draw. The Revs finished their preseason schedule with a 2–1 win over the Carolina Railhawks in which Schilawski scored the game winner in the 87th minute.

During the North Carolina trip, the Revs were also joined by three trialists. Midfielders Gareth Williams and Andres Raad didn't end up signing, while Serbian midfielder Marko Perović joined the team in early April after the season had begun.

=== March ===
New England began their 15th Major League Soccer regular season on the road against the LA Galaxy on March 27, 2010. They lost 1–0 on a fourth-minute goal by Edson Buddle.

=== April ===
==== On the field ====
April started more positively for the Revs with a 2–0 win at rival D.C. United on April 3, 2010 behind two goals in two minutes from second-half substitute Kenny Mansally. The momentum continued with the Revs home opener against Toronto FC on April 10. After going down a goal at halftime, the Revs answered with four goals in 19 minutes in the second half, including a 12-minute hat-trick by rookie Zack Schilawski, only the third hat-trick by a rookie in MLS history.

On April 17, the Revs made their second cross-country trip of the young season. And like the first trip, it ended in defeat, this time to the San Jose Earthquakes 2–0.

The Revs finished the month with a disappointing home loss against the Colorado Rapids. After going down 1–0 in the fourteenth minute, the Revs equalized through an impressive free kick by Marko Perović, the Serbian's first MLS goal. Colorado controlled possession for most of the game, however, and Pablo Mastroeni made them pay with a game-winner in the 73rd minute.

==== Off the field ====
On April 26, the Revs announced that midfielder Shalrie Joseph had been granted an indefinite leave of absence from the team for personal reasons. He had missed four of the team's first five games, and made an instant impact in the one game he did start, the 4–1 victory over Toronto.

On the last day of the month, the Revolution announced their second international friendly of the season. This one will be played against Brazilian club Cruzeiro on June 13 at Gillette Stadium.

=== May ===
==== On the field ====
The Revolution played eight games in May, the most in a single month since August 2008, when they also played eight games. Six of the games were in MLS league play. The other two were a U.S. Open Cup qualifier at the New York Red Bulls on May 12, and a friendly against Portuguese club Benfica on May 19.

On May 1, the Revolution drew FC Dallas 1–1 in a match that featured 12 cards. The team again struggled to maintain possession, and were lucky to come away with a point after both Kheli Dube and Joseph Niouky were ejected in the second half. Just four days after salvaging a point against Dallas, the Revs hosted Chivas USA on May 5 at Gillette Stadium. For the second game in a row, the team went down a man. This time Marko Perovic was the guilty party, earning a red card in the 28th minute. The Revs went on to lose the game 4–0. Another quick turnaround saw the team play a much better game in Columbus on May 8. Rookie Zak Boggs, starting because of injuries and Perovic's suspension, scored his first two MLS goals. The game was tied 2–2 until the first minute of stoppage time, when Robbie Rogers put the Crew up for good.

The Revs next match was a U.S. Open Cup qualifier at the New York Red Bulls on Wednesday May 12, 2010. The team lost 3–0 and thus failed to qualify for the competition. Their next league match was a scoreless draw at home against the San Jose Earthquakes on May 15. The Revolution then played a friendly match against Portuguese champions Benfica on May 19, which they lost 4–0. Their return to league play at Toronto FC on May 22 was also the return of Shalrie Joseph, who had played only one game (also against Toronto) because of injury and suspension. Despite the return of their captain, the Revs lost the game 1–0.

The team finished its May schedule with a 3–2 win against New York Red Bulls at home on Saturday, May 29, 2010. During the game, Preston Burpo fractured his lower right leg in a collision with the Red Bulls' Dane Richards.

==== Off the field ====
On May 14, the team released Honduran midfielder Mauricio Castro. He had yet to make an appearance in 2010 due to injury. Castro's departure leaves the team with a vacant roster spot, which could be filled by one of the three trialists joining the Revs for their friendly against Benfica. Serbian defender Ivan Gvozdenovic (a former teammate of current Rev Marko Perovic), English defensive midfielder and 2010 SuperDraft pick Jason Griffiths, and Haiti national team player Jean-Baptiste Fritzson were all available and played against Benfica.

On May 21, Frank Dell'Apa reported on the Boston Globe's Corner Kicks blog that Shalrie Joseph would be available for the following day's game against Toronto FC after completing a 5-game suspension as part of his entrance into the league's substance abuse program.

=== June ===
==== On the field ====
After an 8-game May schedule, the Revolution played only 3 in the month of June because of the 2010 FIFA World Cup break. The month's first match was a 3–0 loss to Seattle Sounders FC in Seattle. The Revs were back in action on June 13 for a friendly against Brazilian club Cruzeiro, which they lost 3–0 on a hat-trick by Wellington Paulista. When the Revs' regular season returned to action on June 27, the team's poor form continued with a 1–0 home defeat to the Chicago Fire.

==== Off the field ====
On June 8, the Revolution announced that it had resigned Steve Ralston from AC St. Louis. The MLS all-time leader in assists, appearances, starts, and minutes was given back the number 14, which he had worn in his first stint with the club. Sainey Nyassi, who had been wearing number 14, took the number 17 jersey. Ralston returned to the field for the Revs in their friendly against Cruzeiro and promptly dislocated his left elbow. He's expected to miss four to six weeks.

On June 24, the team signed midfielder Jason Griffiths, whom it had drafted in the third round of the 2010 MLS SuperDraft. Griffiths made his first appearance as a substitute in the Revs' 1–0 loss to the Chicago Fire three days later.

=== July ===
==== On the field ====
July began the same way June ended for the Revs, with a loss. For the second year in a row, the team was blown out by Real Salt Lake in Utah, this time by a 5–0 scoreline (last year the Revs lost the same fixture 6-0). The Revolution looked unlikely to fare much better against the league leading LA Galaxy at Gillette Stadium the following week, but surprised many by pulling out a 2–0 win, the team's first victory since May.

Mid-July saw the Revs take a break from MLS play to participate in SuperLiga 2010. The team was drawn into group B, which also included the Chicago Fire from MLS and Mexican sides Pumas UNAM and Monarcas Morelia. The Revs won their opening match against Pumas 1–0 on Zack Schilawski's team-leading 6th goal across all competitions. SuperLiga 2010 continued for the Revs on June 17 in Chicago with a 1–0 win over the Fire that clinched them a berth in the semifinals. The team returned to Gillette Stadium to finish up group play against Morelia on the 20th. Once again, the Revs won by a 1–0 scoreline, with Perovic again the goalscorer. The win made the Revolution the first team ever to post a perfect record (3-0-0) in SuperLiga group play.

The team's last match of the month was its first-ever trip to PPL Park, the new stadium of the expansion Philadelphia Union. After falling behind in the 25th minute on a goal from Sebastian Le Toux, the Revs equalized through Marko Perovic's 4th goal in 5 games across all competitions. SuperLiga will resume in early August, when the Revs will play a semifinal match against Mexican club Puebla.

==== Off the field ====
Former Revolution captain Steve Ralston announced his retirement from professional soccer after the team's SuperLiga match against Morelia on July 20. Two days later, he joined the Houston Dynamo as an assistant coach. Ralston had played in only one game during his return to the Revs, a friendly defeat to Brazilian club Cruzeiro during which he dislocated his elbow.

On July 26, the team announced that it had waived Michael Videira. He had made 12 appearances for the Revs since joining the team in 2009, but had yet to make an appearance during the 2010 season. The move, paired with Ralston's retirement, left the team with two vacant roster spots. These spots were then filled on July 30, when the team announced the signings of Serbian forward Ilija Stolica and Brazilian midfielder/forward Roberto Linck.

=== August ===
==== On the field ====
The Revs began the month of August with a win on penalties over Puebla F.C. in the SuperLiga semifinals. The match ended 1–1 after 90 minutes and went straight to penalties, where the Revolution prevailed 5–3. Kenny Mansally was the game's hero, scoring the team's only goal and converting the winning penalty. The Revs will host the SuperLiga final on September 1 at 7 p.m.

The club's first league match of the month was a 1–0 win over D.C. United in Foxborough on August 7. Pat Phelan scored the only goal, the first of his MLS career, in the 42nd minute off of a Chris Tierney free kick. Next up for the Revs was a home match against the Houston Dynamo on Saturday, August 14. The team extended their unbeaten streak to 8 games in all competitions with yet another 1–0 win. The lone goal came from Ilija Stolica, who made his first start against the Dynamo.

On August 18, the Revs began a two-game road-trip with a 2–1 loss to the Chicago Fire. Marko Perovic gave the Revs the lead in the 16th minute with his team-leading 7th goal of the season across all competitions, but it wasn't enough, as the Fire came back to win on an 85th-minute goal by Calen Carr. The road-trip ended point-less as the Revs fell to the Kansas City Wizards 4–1 on August 21.

The month's schedule came to a close with the Revolution's first home match against the Philadelphia Union on August 28. After taking an early lead and conceding a late equalizer, the Revs looked likely to get at least some points out of the match until a Philly found a stoppage time winner from Justin Mapp.

==== Off the field ====
On August 11, 2010, the team reached a termination agreement with Senegalese midfielder Joseph Niouky. Despite regularly featuring in Steve Nicol's lineup throughout the season, Niouky was never popular with Revs fans, who felt he failed to contribute on the pitch.

=== September ===
==== On the field ====
After a promising run through July and early August, the Revs began September stumbling. They went into the SuperLiga final on September 1 riding a three-game losing streak. which was soon extended to four with a 2–1 loss to Monarcas Morelia of Mexico.

The club returned to league play on September 4 with a home match against Seattle Sounders FC. The Revs started the game well, creating several chances, but they went down 1–0 in the 59th minute on a goal from Steve Zakuani. Instead of succumbing, however, the Revolution battled back, eventually winning the match 3–1 on goals from Chris Tierney, Marko Perovic, and Kheli Dube, who returned after a lengthy injury absence. Unfortunately for the Revolution, they were unable to build on the Seattle win, losing their next match against Chivas USA 2–0.

The Revolution's road woes continued the following week, when they lost 3–0 on the road to the Colorado Rapids. Their road trip continued midweek at FC Dallas, where the Revs took the Hoops by surprise, jumping out to a 2–0 lead on goals from Shalrie Joseph (his first of the year) and Ilija Stolica. When David Ferreira missed a penalty late in the first half, it looked like it was going to be the Revs' night, but a second half penalty from Ferreira and a goal from Jeff Cunningham on literally the second-to-last kick of the match gave FCD a 2–2 draw.

Things started well for the Revs against Columbus four days later, but ended in a case of deja vu for the home team. New England once again scored an early goal, this time through Pat Phelan in the second minute. The Revs again extended their lead in the second half, this time on a penalty from Shalrie Joseph. And once again, the Revs' opponents were able to come from behind to secure a 2–2 draw, this time through goals from Steven Lenhart and Guillermo Barros Schelotto. The result officially eliminated the Revolution from the 2010 MLS Cup Playoffs.

==== Off the field ====
On September 30, the team announced that it had released Lithuanian forward Edgaras Jankauskas. The injury-prone forward scored 2 goals in 14 appearances for the Revolution, most of them in 2009.

=== October ===
==== On the field ====
The Revs began the month with another promising, but ultimately frustrating performance, this time against Real Salt Lake. New England possessed the ball well against the defending MLS Cup champs, and looked destined to capture a share of the points after Kenny Mansally's 82nd-minute equalizer, but just two minutes later Álvaro Saborío gave Salt Lake the win.

The club's good run of form finally turned into three points the following week, when the Revs defeated the Houston Dynamo 2–1 for just their second road win of the season. They continued their winning ways the following week with a 1–0 win over the Kansas City Wizards in their final home match of the year. The Revolution win knocked Kansas City out of playoff contention. The club's final match of the 2010 season will take place on October 21, 2010 at the New York Red Bulls. It will be the Revs' first visit to Red Bull Arena.

==== Off the field ====
Before their final home match of the year against Kansas City on October 16, the Revolution announced the winners of their 2010 team awards. Marko Perović was named the team's MVP for the year after leading the team with eight goals across all competitions. Kevin Alston won the club's best defender award, while Taylor Twellman named the Revolution's MLS W.O.R.K.S. Humanitarian of the Year.

== Match results ==
Win Tie Loss

=== Pre-season ===
February 23, 2010	New England Revolution	0–2	FC Dallas	Orlando, Florida
		(report)	Harris 13'; Chávez 73'

February 25, 2010	New England Revolution	6–0	Florida College All-Stars	Orlando, Florida
	Joseph 39' (pen.); Nyassi 59'; Schilawski 63'; Dube 68'; Mansally 84'; Osei 86'	(report)

March 13, 2010	Charlotte Eagles	0–2	New England Revolution	Charlotte, North Carolina
		(report)	Schilawski 21'; Mansally 73'

March 17, 2010	Duke Blue Devils	1–1	New England Revolution	Cary, North Carolina
	Sih 14'	(report)	Schilawski 13'	Stadium: WakeMed Soccer Park

March 21, 2010	Carolina RailHawks FC	1–2	New England Revolution	Cary, North Carolina
	Schulte 85'	(report)	Phelan 41'; Schilawski 87'	Stadium: WakeMed Soccer Park

=== MLS regular season ===
March 27, 2010	LA Galaxy	1–0	New England Revolution	Carson, California
9:00 PM PDT	Buddle 6'	(report)	Alston (yellow card) 18'; Niouky (yellow card) 41'	Stadium: The Home Depot Center; Attendance: 21,376; Referee: Terry Vaughn

April 3, 2010	D.C. United	0–2	New England Revolution	Washington, D.C.
7:30 PM EDT	Peña (yellow card) 86'	(report)	Mansally 80', 82'	Stadium: RFK Stadium; Attendance: 20,664; Referee: Baldomero Toledo

April 10, 2010	New England Revolution	4–1	Toronto FC	Foxborough, Massachusetts
7:00 PM EDT	Schilawski 47', 51', 58'; Nyassi 66'	(report)	Hščanovičs (yellow card) 11'; De Rosario 28'; De Guzman (yellow card) 85'	Stadium: Gillette Stadium; Attendance: 12,798; Referee: Alex Prus

April 17, 2010	San Jose Earthquakes	2–0	New England Revolution	Santa Clara, California
7:00 PM PDT	Wondolowski 57'; Opara 72'	(report)	Niouky (yellow card) 16'	Stadium: Buck Shaw Stadium; Attendance: 9,082; Referee: Elias Bazakos

April 24, 2010	New England Revolution	1–2	Colorado Rapids	Foxborough, Massachusetts
7:30 PM EDT	Perović 19'; Phelan (yellow card) 48'	(report)	Ballouchy 14'; Mastroeni (yellow card) 66', (goal) 73'	Stadium: Gillette Stadium; Attendance: 8,142; Referee: Jair Marrufo

May 1, 2010	New England Revolution	1–1	FC Dallas	Foxborough, Massachusetts
7:30 PM EDT	Sinovic (yellow card) 14'; Schilawski 41'; Dube (red card) 56'; Niouky (yellow card) 65' (red card) 72'; Nyassi (yellow card) 77'; Perović (yellow card) 90+2'; Burpo (yellow card) 90+5'	(report)	Benítez (yellow card) 25'; John (yellow card) 42'; Sala (yellow card) 42'; McCarty (yellow card) 62'; Harris 66' (yellow card) 78'	Stadium: Gillette Stadium; Attendance: 10,057; Referee: Jeff Gontarek

May 5, 2010	New England Revolution	0–4	Chivas USA	Foxborough, Massachusetts
7:30 PM EDT	Perović (red card) 28'; Jankauskas (yellow card) 86'	(report)	Padilla 26', 48'; Zemanski (yellow card) 28'; Braun 33'; Gavin 81'	Stadium: Gillette Stadium; Attendance: 5,990; Referee: Steven DePiero

May 8, 2010	Columbus Crew	3–2	New England Revolution	Columbus, Ohio
7:00 PM EDT	Gaven 31'; Gibbs 35' (o.g.); Moffat (yellow card) 77'; Rogers 90+1', (yellow card) 90+1'	(report)	Boggs 29', 40'	Stadium: Columbus Crew Stadium; Attendance: 10,197; Referee: Ramón Hernández

May 15, 2010	New England Revolution	0–0	San Jose Earthquakes	Foxborough, Massachusetts
6:00 PM EDT	Niouky (yellow card) 39'	(report)	Corrales (yellow card) 20'	Stadium: Gillette Stadium; Attendance: 13,611; Referee: Terry Vaughn

May 22, 2010	Toronto FC	1–0	New England Revolution	Toronto, Ontario, Canada
1:00 PM EDT	Šarić (yellow card) 7'; Barrett 53', (yellow card) 58'; Gargan (yellow card) 75'	(report)	Joseph (yellow card) 25'; Perović (yellow card) 75'	Stadium: BMO Field; Attendance: 20,672; Referee: Michael Kennedy

May 29, 2010	New England Revolution	3–2	New York Red Bulls	Foxborough, Massachusetts
8:00 PM EDT	Perović 7'; Ream 24' (o.g.); Zack Schilawski 80'		Stammler 20'; Mendes (yellow card) 44' (yellow-red card) 56'; Ángel 49'; Miller (red card) 75'	Stadium: Gillette Stadium; Attendance: 11,316; Referee: Andrew Chapin

June 5, 2010	Seattle Sounders FC	3–0	New England Revolution	Seattle, Washington
7:30 PM PDT	González 5', (yellow card) 36'; Zakuani 24'; Montero 42'	(report)	Gibbs (yellow card) 3'; Niouky (yellow card) 64'	Stadium: Qwest Field; Attendance: 36,344; Referee: Jorge Ganzalez

June 27, 2010	New England Revolution	0–1	Chicago Fire	Foxborough, Massachusetts
7:00 PM EDT		(report)	Pappa 30'; Conde (yellow card) 47'	Stadium: Gillette Stadium; Attendance: 12,306; Referee: Jair Marrufo

July 2, 2010	Real Salt Lake	5–0	New England Revolution	Sandy, Utah
8:00 MT	Espíndola (yellow card) 22', (goal) 27'; Olave 45+2'; Wingert (yellow card) 47'; Saborío 52', 57'; Findley 85'	Report		Stadium: Rio Tinto Stadium; Attendance: 19,101; Referee: Kevin Stott

July 10, 2010	New England Revolution	2–0	LA Galaxy	Foxborough, Massachusetts
7:30 PM EDT	Perović 67'; Nyassi 74', (yellow card) 88'	(report)	Bowen (yellow card) 43'; Juninho (yellow card) 64'	Stadium: Gillette Stadium; Attendance: 20,155; Referee: Paul Ward

July 31, 2010	Philadelphia Union	1–1	New England Revolution	Chester, Pennsylvania
3:30 PM EDT	Le Toux 25'; Fred (yellow card) 60'	(report)	Joseph (yellow card) 45'; Perović 70'	Stadium: PPL Park; Attendance: 18,137; Referee: Jason Anno

August 7, 2010	New England Revolution	1–0	D.C. United	Foxborough, Massachusetts
7:30 PM EDT	Gibbs (yellow card) 30'; Phelan 42'	(report)	Hernández (yellow card) 70'; Talley (yellow card) 89'	Stadium: Gillette Stadium; Attendance: 12,218; Referee: Terry Vaughn

August 14, 2010	New England Revolution	1–0	Houston Dynamo	Foxborough, Massachusetts
8:00 PM EDT	Smith (yellow card) 41'; Stolica 62'	(report)	Cruz (yellow card) 41'; Obodai (yellow card) 76'	Stadium: Gillette Stadium; Attendance: 11,546; Referee: Jair Marrufo

August 18, 2010	Chicago Fire	2–1	New England Revolution	Bridgeview, Illinois
7:00 PM CDT	Hušidić 32'; Castillo (yellow card) 38'; Conde (yellow card) 39'; Carr 85'	(report)	Phelan (yellow card) 12'; Perović 16', (yellow card) 43'; Gibbs (yellow card) 26'; Osei (yellow card) 52'; Barnes (yellow card) 90+2'	Stadium: Toyota Park; Attendance: 14,056; Referee: Michael Kennedy

August 21, 2010	Kansas City Wizards	4–1	New England Revolution	Kansas City, Kansas
7:30 PM CDT	Diop 16', 27'; Kamara 65'; Jewsbury 69'	(report)	Mansally 37'; Joseph (yellow card) 44'; Nyassi (yellow card) 74'	Stadium: CommunityAmerica Ballpark; Attendance: 10,385; Referee: Ricardo Salazar

August 28, 2010	New England Revolution	1–2	Philadelphia Union	Foxborough, Massachusetts
7:30 PM EDT	Osei (yellow card) 19'; Stolica 31'; Gibbs (red card) 40'	(report)	Miglioranzi (yellow card) 29'; McInerney 82', (yellow card) 83'; Harvey (yellow card) 84'; Mapp 92+'	Stadium: Gillette Stadium; Attendance: 13,578; Referee: Hilario Grajeda

September 4, 2010	New England Revolution	3–1	Seattle Sounders FC	Foxborough, Massachusetts
7:30 PM EDT	Tierney 70'; Perović 73', (yellow card) 85'; Dube 81'	(report)	Zakuani 59'; Montero (yellow card) 66'; Riley (yellow card) 71'	Stadium: Gillette Stadium; Attendance: 13,124; Referee: Silviu Petrescu

September 10, 2010	Chivas USA	2–0	New England Revolution	Carson, California
7:30 PM PDT	Braun 6'; Nagamura 36'; Umaña (yellow card) 86'	(report)		Stadium: Home Depot Center; Attendance: 10,783; Referee: Abbey Okulaja

September 18, 2010	Colorado Rapids	3–0	New England Revolution	Commerce City, Colorado
7:00 PM MDT	Cummings 5'; Casey 35'; Thompson 83', (yellow card) 84'	(report)	Sinovic (yellow card) 67'	Stadium: Dick's Sporting Goods Park; Attendance: 16,314; Referee: Mark Geiger

September 22, 2010	FC Dallas	2–2	New England Revolution	Frisco, Texas
7:30 p.m. CDT	Ferreira 80' (pen.); Cunningham 90+3'	(report)	Joseph 5'; Gibbs (yellow card) 17'; Barnes (yellow card) 33'; Stolica 66'	Stadium: Pizza Hut Park; Attendance: 7,468; Referee: Baldomero Toledo

September 25, 2010	New England Revolution	2–2	Columbus Crew	Foxborough, Massachusetts
7:30 p.m. EDT	Phelan 2', (yellow card) 90+4'; Perović (yellow card) 37'; Joseph 56' (pen.)	(report)	Hesmer (yellow card) 56'; Lenhart 62'; Francis (yellow card) 72'; Barros Schelotto 80'; Burns (yellow card) 88'	Stadium: Gillette Stadium; Attendance: 13,533; Referee: Paul Ward

October 2, 2010	New England Revolution	1–2	Real Salt Lake	Foxborough, Massachusetts
7:30 PM EDT	Sinovic (yellow card) 40'; Nyassi 82'; Perović (yellow card) 90+3'	(report)	Borchers 68'; Grabavoy (yellow card) 41'; Saborío 84'	Stadium: Gillette Stadium; Attendance: 18,130; Referee: Ricardo Salazar

October 10, 2010	Houston Dynamo	1–2	New England Revolution	Houston, Texas
7:30 p.m. CDT	Weaver (yellow card) 41'; Cochrane (yellow card) 44'; Serioux (yellow card) 50'; Oduro 59'; Cameron (yellow card) 79' (red card) 90+7'; Ngwenya (red card) 90+3'	(report)	Phelan (yellow card) 26'; Gibbs (yellow card) 40'; Joseph 43'; Dube 71'; Barnes (yellow card) 83'	Stadium: Robertson Stadium; Attendance: 16,479; Referee: Mark Geiger

October 16, 2010	New England Revolution	1–0	Kansas City Wizards	Foxborough, Massachusetts
8:00 p.m. EDT	Joseph 31'; Mansally (yellow card) 78'; Osei (yellow card) 91+'	(report)	Jewsbury (yellow card) 29'; Espinoza (yellow card) 68'	Stadium: Gillette Stadium; Attendance: 18,298; Referee: Jair Marrufo

October 21, 2010	New York Red Bulls	2–0	New England Revolution	Harrison, New Jersey
7:30 p.m. EDT				Stadium: Red Bull Arena; Attendance: 15,866

=== Open Cup ===
May 12, 2010 Qualification	New York Red Bulls	3–0	New England Revolution	Harrison, New Jersey
8:00 PM EDT	Wolyniec 36', 64'; Ubiparipović 62'	(report)	Phelan (yellow card) 88'	Stadium: Red Bull Arena; Attendance: 1,935; Referee: Shane Moody

=== Friendlies ===
May 19, 2010	New England Revolution	0–4	Benfica	Foxborough, Massachusetts
8:00 PM EDT	Fritzson (yellow card) 31'; Griffiths (yellow card) 46'	(report)	Menezes 15'; Sidnei 18'; Peixoto 32'; Alan Kardec 53'	Stadium: Gillette Stadium; Attendance: 12,735; Referee: Hilario Grajeda

June 13, 2010	New England Revolution	0–3	Cruzeiro	Foxborough, Massachusetts
7:00 PM EDT	Osei (yellow card) 13'; Mansally (yellow card) 56'; Phelan (yellow card) 64'	(report)	Wellington Paulista 24', 49', 83'; Henrique (yellow card) 37'	Stadium: Gillette Stadium; Attendance: 12,160; Referee: Chris Penso

=== SuperLiga ===
July 14, 2010 Group B	New England Revolution (United States)	1–0	(Mexico) Pumas UNAM	Foxborough, Massachusetts
8:00 PM EDT	Mansally (yellow card) 11'; Schilawski 18'; Joseph (yellow card) 45'; Niouky (yellow card) 56'; Nyassi (yellow card) 84'	(report)	Espinosa (yellow card) 43'; Augusto (yellow card) 56'	Stadium: Gillette Stadium; Attendance: 7,201; Referee: Silviu Petrescu

July 17, 2010 Group B	Chicago Fire (United States)	0–1	(United States) New England Revolution	Bridgeview, Illinois
6:00 PM CDT	Conde (yellow card) 19'	(report)	Perović 77'	Stadium: Toyota Park; Attendance: 16,117; Referee: Kevin Stott

July 20, 2010 Group B	New England Revolution (United States)	1–0	(Mexico) Monarcas Morelia	Foxborough, Massachusetts
8:00 PM EDT	Barnes (yellow card) 57'; Perović 62'; Sinovic (yellow card) 84'	(report)	Aldrete (yellow card) 41'; Lugo (yellow card) 49'; García (yellow card) 89'	Stadium: Gillette Stadium; Attendance: 8,173; Referee: Elmer Rodas

August 4, 2010 Semifinal	New England Revolution (United States)	1–1 (5–3 p)	(Mexico) Puebla	Gillette Stadium, Foxborough, Massachusetts
7:00 PM EDT	Nyassi (yellow card) 25'; Mansally 56', (yellow card) 87'; Gibbs (yellow card) 72'	(report)	Olivera 58'; Juárez (yellow card) 61'	Attendance: 5,854; Referee: Roberto Moreno
	Penalties
	Joseph (penalty scored); Reis (penalty scored); Tierney (penalty scored); Phelan (penalty scored); Mansally (penalty scored)		(penalty scored) Olivera; (penalty scored) Juárez; (penalty scored) Ayala; (penalty missed) Lugo

September 1, 2010 Final	New England Revolution (United States)	1–2	(Mexico) Monarcas Morelia	Gillette Stadium, Foxborough, Massachusetts
7:00 PM EDT	Barnes (yellow card) 65'; Alston 79'; Phelan (yellow card) 86'	(report)	Sabah (yellow card) 39' (yellow-red card) 90+1', (goal) 65', 75'; Lozano (yellow card) 85'; Rey (yellow card) 88'	Attendance: 10,414; Referee: Carlos Batres (first half); Elmar Rodhas (second half)

== Standings ==
Conference

Pos	Team	Pld	W	L	T	GF	GA	GD	Pts	Qualification
1	New York Red Bulls	30	15	9	6	38	29	+9	51	MLS Cup Playoffs
2	Columbus Crew	30	14	8	8	40	34	+6	50	MLS Cup Playoffs
3	Kansas City Wizards	30	11	13	6	36	35	+1	39	
4	Chicago Fire	30	9	12	9	37	38	−1	36	
5	Toronto FC	30	9	13	8	33	41	−8	35	
6	New England Revolution	30	9	16	5	32	50	−18	32	
7	Philadelphia Union	30	8	15	7	35	49	−14	31	
8	D.C. United	30	6	20	4	21	47	−26	22	

Source: MLS

Overall

Pos	Team	Pld	W	L	T	GF	GA	GD	Pts	Qualification
1	LA Galaxy (S)	30	18	7	5	44	26	+18	59	CONCACAF Champions League
2	Real Salt Lake	30	15	4	11	45	20	+25	56	
3	New York Red Bulls	30	15	9	6	38	29	+9	51	
4	FC Dallas	30	12	4	14	42	28	+14	50	CONCACAF Champions League
5	Columbus Crew	30	14	8	8	40	34	+6	50	
6	Seattle Sounders FC	30	14	10	6	39	35	+4	48	CONCACAF Champions League
7	Colorado Rapids (C)	30	12	8	10	44	32	+12	46	CONCACAF Champions League
8	San Jose Earthquakes	30	13	10	7	34	33	+1	46	
9	Kansas City Wizards	30	11	13	6	36	35	+1	39	
10	Chicago Fire	30	9	12	9	37	38	−1	36	
11	Toronto FC	30	9	13	8	33	41	−8	35	CONCACAF Champions League
12	Houston Dynamo	30	9	15	6	40	49	−9	33	
13	New England Revolution	30	9	16	5	32	50	−18	32	
14	Philadelphia Union	30	8	15	7	35	49	−14	31	
15	Chivas USA	30	8	18	4	31	45	−14	28	
16	D.C. United	30	6	20	4	21	47	−26	22	

Source: MLS
Rules for classification: 1) points; 2) head-to-head record; 3) goal difference; 4) number of goals scored
(C) Champions; (S) Supporters' Shield

=== Results summary ===
Overall								Home						Away					
Pld	Pts	W	L	T	GF	GA	GD	W	L	T	GF	GA	GD	W	L	T	GF	GA	GD
29	32	9	15	5	32	48	−16	7	5	3	21	18	+3	2	10	2	11	30	−19

Last updated: October 20, 2010
Source: MLSsoccer.com
Pld = Matches played; Pts = Points; W = Matches won; T = Matches tied; L = Matches lost; GF = Goals for; GA = Goals against; GD = Goal difference

Round	1	2	3	4	5	6	7	8	9	10	11	12	13	14	15	16	17	18	19	20	21	22	23	24	25	26	27	28	29	30
Stadium	A	A	H	A	H	H	H	A	H	A	H	A	H	A	H	A	H	H	A	A	H	H	A	A	A	H	H	A	H	A
Result	L	W	W	L	L	T	L	L	T	L	W	L	L	L	W	T	W	W	L	L	L	W	L	L	T	T	L	W	W	
Position	10	8	3	8	10	9	14	14	13	14	13	13	13	15	15	15	14	11	11	12	14	12	14	14	14	14	14	13	12	

Updated to match(es) played on October 20, 2010. Source: MLS Results and League table
A = Away; H = Home; W = Win; L = Loss; T = Tie

=== Roster ===
As of September 30, 2010.

Note: Flags indicate national team as defined under FIFA eligibility rules; some limited exceptions apply. Players may hold more than one non-FIFA nationality.

No.	Pos.	Nation	Player
1	GK	USA	Matt Reis
5	DF	GHA	Emmanuel Osei
7	FW	GAM	Kenny Mansally
8	MF	USA	Chris Tierney
9	FW	SRB	Ilija Stolica
11	FW	ZIM	Kheli Dube
12	DF	USA	Cory Gibbs
15	FW	USA	Zack Schilawski
16	MF	ENG	Jason Griffiths
17	MF	GAM	Sainey Nyassi
18	MF	BER	Khano Smith
20	FW	USA	Taylor Twellman

No.	Pos.	Nation	Player
21	MF	GRN	Shalrie Joseph (captain)
22	FW	BRA	Roberto Linck
24	GK	USA	Preston Burpo
25	DF	USA	Darrius Barnes
26	MF	USA	Nico Colaluca
27	DF	USA	Seth Sinovic
28	DF	USA	Pat Phelan
29	MF	SRB	Marko Perović
30	DF	USA	Kevin Alston
33	FW	USA	Zak Boggs
34	GK	USA	Bobby Shuttleworth
40	GK	USA	Tim Murray

== Kits ==
Home	Home Alternate	Away	Away Alternate

Type	Shirt	Shorts	Socks	First appearance / Info
Home	Navy	Navy	Navy	
Home Alt.	Navy	Navy	Navy	MLS, March 27 against Los Angeles → 2009 Home Socks
Away	White	White	White	
Away Alt.	White	White	White	MLS, April 3 against D.C. United → 2009 Away Socks
