= 2009 Colorado Rapids season =

Colorado Rapids
2009 season
- Owner: Stan Kroenke
- Coach: Gary Smith
- Major League Soccer: 6th
- 2009 MLS Cup Playoffs: Did not qualify
- Rocky Mountain Cup: Runners-Up
- Average home league attendance: 13,018
- Biggest win: COL 4-0 RBNY (7/25); COL 4-0 CHV (8/8)
- Biggest defeat: SEA 3-0 COL (6/28); RSL 3-0 COL (10/24)
Home colors	Away colors

The 2009 Colorado Rapids season was the fourteenth season of the team's existence. It began on March 21 with a 2–1 loss at Chivas USA and ended on October 24 with a 3–0 loss to Real Salt Lake. The result put RSL in the playoffs as the 8th seed and kept Colorado out on goal differential.

== Squad ==
=== First-team squad ===
As of June 20, 2009.

Note: Flags indicate national team as defined under FIFA eligibility rules; some limited exceptions apply. Players may hold more than one non-FIFA nationality.

No.	Pos.	Nation	Player
2	DF	USA	Jordan Harvey
3	DF	USA	Drew Moor
5	DF	USA	Ty Harden
6	MF	USA	Greg Dalby
7	DF	USA	Cory Gibbs
8	MF	MAR	Mehdi Ballouchy
9	FW	USA	Conor Casey
10	FW	ARG	Facundo Diz
12	FW	USA	Pat Noonan
13	FW	USA	Ross Schunk
14	FW	JAM	Omar Cummings
15	MF	USA	Jacob Peterson
17	GK	USA	Preston Burpo

No.	Pos.	Nation	Player
18	GK	USA	Matt Pickens
19	MF	USA	Ciaran O'Brien (on loan at Montreal Impact)
20	MF	SCO	Jamie Smith
21	DF	FRA	Julien Baudet
22	MF	USA	Nick LaBrocca
23	MF	USA	Colin Clark
25	MF	USA	Pablo Mastroeni (captain)
26	DF	USA	Michael Holody (on loan at Real Maryland)
27	MF	JPN	Kosuke Kimura
29	DF	USA	Scott Palguta
31	GK	USA	Steward Ceus (on loan at Charlotte Eagles)
35	DF	USA	Rob Valentino

== Club ==
=== Management ===
Position	Staff
Technical Director	(United States) Paul Bravo
Head Coach	(England) Gary Smith
Assistant Coach	(England) Steve Guppy
Goalkeeper Coach	(United States) David Kramer

Last updated: April 18, 2009
Source: Colorado Rapids

=== Other information ===
Owner	(United States) Stan Kroenke
Ground (capacity and dimensions)	Dick's Sporting Goods Park (18,776 / N/A)

Source: Colorado Rapids

== Competitions ==
=== Major League Soccer ===
==== Standings ====
Pos	Team	Pld	W	L	T	GF	GA	GD	Pts	Qualification
1	LA Galaxy	30	12	6	12	36	31	+5	48	MLS Cup Playoffs
2	Houston Dynamo	30	13	8	9	39	29	+10	48	MLS Cup Playoffs
3	Seattle Sounders FC	30	12	7	11	38	29	+9	47	MLS Cup Playoffs
4	Chivas USA	30	13	11	6	34	31	+3	45	MLS Cup Playoffs
5	Real Salt Lake	30	11	12	7	43	35	+8	40	MLS Cup Playoffs
6	Colorado Rapids	30	10	10	10	42	38	+4	40	
7	FC Dallas	30	11	13	6	50	47	+3	39	
8	San Jose Earthquakes	30	7	14	9	36	50	−14	30	

Source: MLS

Pos	Team	Pld	W	L	T	GF	GA	GD	Pts	Qualification
1	Columbus Crew (S)	30	13	7	10	41	31	+10	49	CONCACAF Champions League
2	LA Galaxy	30	12	6	12	36	31	+5	48	CONCACAF Champions League
3	Houston Dynamo	30	13	8	9	39	29	+10	48	North American SuperLiga
4	Seattle Sounders FC	30	12	7	11	38	29	+9	47	CONCACAF Champions League
5	Chicago Fire	30	11	7	12	39	34	+5	45	North American SuperLiga
6	Chivas USA	30	13	11	6	34	31	+3	45	North American SuperLiga
7	New England Revolution	30	11	10	9	33	37	−4	42	North American SuperLiga
8	Real Salt Lake (C)	30	11	12	7	43	35	+8	40	CONCACAF Champions League
9	Colorado Rapids	30	10	10	10	42	38	+4	40	
10	D.C. United	30	9	8	13	43	44	−1	40	
11	FC Dallas	30	11	13	6	50	47	+3	39	
12	Toronto FC	30	10	11	9	37	46	−9	39	CONCACAF Champions League
13	Kansas City Wizards	30	8	13	9	33	42	−9	33	
14	San Jose Earthquakes	30	7	14	9	36	50	−14	30	
15	New York Red Bulls	30	5	19	6	27	47	−20	21	

Source: MLS
Rules for classification: 1) points; 2) head-to-head record; 3) goal difference; 4) number of goals scored
(C) Champions; (S) Supporters' Shield

==== Results summary ====
Overall								Home						Away					
Pld	Pts	W	L	T	GF	GA	GD	W	L	T	GF	GA	GD	W	L	T	GF	GA	GD
30	40	10	10	10	42	38	+4	8	2	5	25	10	+15	2	8	5	17	28	−11

Last updated: October 25, 2009
Source: Major League Soccer
Pld = Matches played; Pts = Points; W = Matches won; T = Matches tied; L = Matches lost; GF = Goals for; GA = Goals against; GD = Goal difference

Round	1	2	3	4	5	6	7	8	9	10	11	12	13	14	15	16	17	18	19	20	21	22	23	24	25	26	27	28	29	30
Stadium	A	H	A	A	A	H	H	A	H	A	A	H	H	A	H	H	A	H	H	H	A	H	H	A	A	H	A	H	A	A
Result	L	W	W	T	L	T	W	T	T	W	T	W	T	L	L	W	L	W	L	W	L	W	W	L	T	T	T	T	L	L

Updated to match(es) played on October 25, 2009. Source: Colorado Rapids
A = Away; H = Home; W = Win; L = Loss; T = Tie

== Matches ==
Win Tie Loss

=== MLS ===
==== March ====
March 21, 2009	Chivas USA	2–1	Colorado Rapids	Carson, California United States
	Harris (yellow card) 51'; Nagamura 55'; Nagamura 59'; Nagamura (yellow card) 61'; Marsch (yellow card) 73'	Report	Cummings 30'; Clark (yellow card) 62'	Stadium: The Home Depot Center; Attendance: 16,453; Referee: Terry Vaughn

March 28, 2009	Colorado Rapids	2–1	Kansas City Wizards	Commerce City, Colorado, United States
	Gibbs (yellow card) 22'; Cooke 65'; Kimura (yellow card) 67'; Cummings 74'	Report	Kraus 63'; Leathers (yellow card) 64'; Gomez (yellow card) 82'	Stadium: Dick's Sporting Goods Park; Attendance: 11,885; Referee: Ricardo Salazar

==== April ====
April 4, 2009	Los Angeles Galaxy	2–3	Colorado Rapids	Carson, California United States
	Gonzalez 37'; Gordon 48'	Report	Casey 1'; Gibbs (yellow card) 46+'; Casey 49'; Casey (yellow card) 63'; Ballouchy (yellow card) 66'; Casey 84'	Stadium: The Home Depot Center; Attendance: 16,709; Referee: Michael Kennedy

April 11, 2009	Columbus Crew	1–1	Colorado Rapids	Columbus, Ohio United States
	Ekpo (yellow card) 29'; Schelotto 41'	Report	Gibbs (yellow card) 26'; Palguta (yellow card) 68'; Casey 82'; Burpo (yellow card) 94+'	Stadium: Columbus Crew Stadium; Referee: Edvin Jurisevic

April 19, 2009	Houston Dynamo	1–0	Colorado Rapids	Houston, Texas, United States
	Ching 20'; Clark (yellow card) 34'; Davis (yellow card) 63'	Report	Casey (yellow card) 25'; Clark (yellow card) 28'; Mastroeni (yellow card) 58'; Cummings (yellow card) 73'	Stadium: Robertson Stadium; Attendance: 12,708; Referee: Mark Geiger

April 25, 2009	Colorado Rapids	1–1	Los Angeles Galaxy	Commerce City, Colorado United States
	Clark 60'	Report	Donovan 82'	Stadium: Dick's Sporting Goods Park; Attendance: 12,180; Referee: Alex Prus

==== May ====
May 2, 2009	Colorado Rapids	2–0	Real Salt Lake	Commerce City, Colorado United States
	LaBrocca 11'; Ihemelu (yellow card) 37'; Kimura 60'	Report	Olave (red card) 41'; Findley (yellow card) 54'; Beckerman (yellow card) 86'	Stadium: Dick's Sporting Goods Park; Attendance: 9,045; Referee: Edvin Jurisevic

May 16, 2009	New England Revolution	1–1	Colorado Rapids	Foxborough, Massachusetts United States
	Phelan (yellow card) 4'; Ralston 18'	Report	Casey 3'; Casey (yellow card) 41'; Cummings (yellow card) 50'	Stadium: Gillette Stadium; Attendance: 10,677; Referee: Shane Moody

May 23, 2009	Colorado Rapids	2–2	Seattle Sounders FC	Commerce City, Colorado United States
19:30 MDT	Clark 26'; Casey 47'; Ihemelu (yellow card) 67'	Report	Montero 17'; Jaqua (yellow card) 28'; Hurtado (yellow card) 57'; Vagenas (yellow card) 61'; Jaqua 76'	Stadium: Dick's Sporting Goods Park; Attendance: 16,528; Referee: Hilario Grajeda

May 30, 2009	New York Red Bulls	2–3	Colorado Rapids	East Rutherford, New Jersey United States
	Angel 45' (pen.); Goldthwaite (yellow card) 59'; Borman 73'; Borman (yellow card) 80'; Angel (yellow card) 82'	Report	Casey 25'; Casey 48'; Ballouchy 60'; Palguta (yellow card) 71'; Pickens (yellow card) 77'	Stadium: Giants Stadium; Attendance: 12,039; Referee: Ricardo Salazar

==== June ====
June 6, 2009	Real Salt Lake	1–1	Colorado Rapids	Sandy, Utah United States
	Espindola (yellow card) 22'; Russell (yellow card) 73' (yellow-red card) 82'; Movsisyan 79'; Mathis (yellow card) 87'	Report	Ballouchy (yellow card) 3'; LaBrocca (yellow card) 45'; Ihemelu (yellow card) 76'; Cummings 88'	Stadium: Rio Tinto Stadium; Attendance: 19,546; Referee: Jeff Gontarek

June 20, 2009	Colorado Rapids	3–0	D.C. United	Commerce City, Colorado United States
	Cummings 11'; Gibbs (yellow card) 12'; Cummings 43'; Clark 49'	Report	John (yellow card) 22'; Wallace (yellow card) 53'	Stadium: Dick's Sporting Goods Park; Attendance: 11,416; Referee: Michael Kennedy

June 24, 2009	Colorado Rapids	1–1	FC Dallas	Commerce City, Colorado United States
	Cummings 84'	Report	Ferreira 37'	Stadium: Dick's Sporting Goods Park; Attendance: 10,583; Referee: Jair Marrufo

June 28, 2009	Seattle Sounders FC	3–0	Colorado Rapids	Seattle, Washington United States
13:00 PST	Ljungberg (yellow card) 19'; Montero 23'; Jaqua 48'; Jaqua 68'; Evans (yellow card) 71'	Report	Ihemelu (yellow card) 17'; Mastroeni (yellow card) 29'; Palguta (yellow card) 41'	Stadium: Qwest Field; Attendance: 32,526; Referee: Alex Prus

==== July ====
July 4, 2009	Colorado Rapids	1–2	Chicago Fire	Commerce City, Colorado United States
	Gibbs (yellow card) 24'; Peterson 76'; Casey (yellow card) 80'	Report	Pappa 30'; Conde 37'	Stadium: Dick's Sporting Goods Park; Attendance: 19,680; Referee: Jorge Gonzalez

July 11, 2009	Colorado Rapids	1–0	FC Dallas	Commerce City, Colorado United States
	Ihemelu (yellow card) 13'; LaBrocca (yellow card) 17'; Kimura 79'; Ballouchy (yellow card) 84'; Dalby (yellow card) 89'	Report		Stadium: Dick's Sporting Goods Park; Attendance: 8,128; Referee: Yader Reyes

July 18, 2009	D.C. United	3–1	Colorado Rapids	Washington, D.C. United States
	Fred (yellow card) 29'; Moreno 47' (pen.); Namoff 56'; Emilio 61'	Report	Namoff 14' (o.g.); Mastroeni (yellow card) 48'; Casey (yellow card) 84'	Stadium: Robert F. Kennedy Memorial Stadium; Attendance: 18,248; Referee: Ricardo Salazar

July 25, 2009	Colorado Rapids	4–0	New York Red Bulls	Commerce City, Colorado United States
	Peterson 5'; Baudet (yellow card) 34'; Noonan 46'; LaBrocca 61'; Ballouchy 67'	Report	Krupnik (yellow card) 33'; Ubiparipovic (red card) 45'; Petke (yellow card) 68'	Stadium: Dick's Sporting Goods Park; Attendance: 16,816; Referee: Jasen Anno

==== August ====
August 1, 2009	Colorado Rapids	0–1	Columbus Crew	Commerce City, Colorado United States
	Ihemelu (yellow card) 60' (yellow-red card) 84'	Report	Marshall 39'; Garey (yellow card) 47+'	Stadium: Dick's Sporting Goods Park; Attendance: 10,851; Referee: Yader Reyes

August 8, 2009	Colorado Rapids	4–0	Chivas USA	Commerce City, Colorado United States
	Mastroeni 1'; Casey 4' 23' 47+' (pen.); Mastroeni (yellow card) 66'	Report	Marsch (yellow card) 40'; Thomas (red card) 46+'	Stadium: Dick's Sporting Goods Park; Attendance: 13,364; Referee: Alex Prus

August 23, 2009	Chicago Fire	3–2	Colorado Rapids	Bridgeview, Illinois United States
	Blanco 72' (pen.); Banner 85'; Robinson (yellow card) 85' (yellow-red card) 93+'; Robinson 93+'	Report	Cummings 48' 58'; Casey (yellow card) 65'; Kimura (yellow card) 71'; Cummings (yellow card) 82'; Gibbs (yellow card) 91+'	Stadium: Toyota Park; Attendance: 15,789; Referee: Ramon Hernandez

August 30, 2009	Colorado Rapids	1–0	Houston Dynamo	Commerce City, Colorado United States
	Harvey (yellow card) 42'; Baudet 55'; Mastroeni (yellow card) 64'; Casey (yellow card) 91+'	Report	Landin (yellow card) 72'; Davis (red card) 87'	Stadium: Dick's Sporting Goods Park; Attendance: 10,897; Referee: Hilario Grajeda

==== September ====
September 5, 2009	Colorado Rapids	1–0	Toronto FC	Commerce City, Colorado United States
	Conor Casey 51'; Michael Holody (yellow card) 84'		Amadou Sanyang (yellow card) 21' (yellow-red card) 76'; Adrian Serioux (red card) 84'	Stadium: Dick's Sporting Goods Park; Attendance: 10,821; Referee: Terry Vaughn

September 12, 2009	Toronto FC	3–2	Colorado Rapids	Toronto, Ontario, Canada
	De Rosario 19'; Attakora (yellow card) 21'; Barrett (yellow card) 67'; White 71'; Attakora 74'	Report	Casey 49'; Holody 89'	Stadium: BMO Field; Attendance: 20,521; Referee: Baldomero Toledo

September 18, 2009	San Jose Earthquakes	1–1	Colorado Rapids	Santa Clara, California United States
	Johnson 8'; Leitch (yellow card) 94+'; McDonald (yellow card) 95+'	Report	Baudet (yellow card) 33'; Casey 95+' (pen.)	Stadium: Buck Shaw Stadium; Attendance: 10,525; Referee: Edvin Jurisevic

September 23, 2009	Colorado Rapids	1–1	San Jose Earthquakes	Commerce City, Colorado United States
	Casey 93+' (pen.)	Report	Wondolowski 67' (pen.); Cannon (yellow card) 91+'	Stadium: Dick's Sporting Goods Park; Attendance: 6,234; Referee: Ricardo Salazar

September 26, 2009	Kansas City Wizards	0–0	Colorado Rapids	Kansas City, Kansas United States
	Harrington (yellow card) 75'	Report	Ballouchy (yellow card) 74'; Kimura (yellow card) 93+'; Casey (yellow card) 95+'	Stadium: CommunityAmerica Ballpark; Attendance: 9,784; Referee: Silviu Petrescu

==== October ====
October 3, 2009	Colorado Rapids	1–1	New England Revolution	Commerce City, Colorado United States
	Ballouchy (yellow card) 9'; Casey 58' (pen.); Baudet (red card) 59'	Report	Dube 29'; Osei (yellow card) 63'	Stadium: Dick's Sporting Goods Park; Attendance: 16,535; Referee: Baldomero Toledo

October 17, 2009	FC Dallas	2–1	Colorado Rapids	Frisco, Texas United States
	John 4'; Hernandez (yellow card) 51'; McCarty (yellow card) 58'; Sala (yellow card) 62'; Ihemelu 66'; John (yellow card) 75'; Harris (yellow card) 85'	Report	Gibbs (yellow card) 3'; LaBrocca (yellow card) 78'; Noonan 71'; Holody (yellow card) 82'	Stadium: Pizza Hut Park; Attendance: 15,243; Referee: Edvin Jurisevic

October 24, 2009	Real Salt Lake	3–0	Colorado Rapids	Sandy, Utah United States
	Findley 15'; Williams (yellow card) 25'; Findley 33'; Borchers (yellow card) 35'; Beckerman (yellow card) 58'; Movsisyan 85' (yellow card) 86'	Report	Baudet (yellow card) 18'; Casey (yellow card) 39'	Stadium: Rio Tinto Stadium; Attendance: 18,675; Referee: Jorge Gonzalez

=== U.S. Open Cup qualification ===
April 7, 2009 Qualification	Los Angeles Galaxy	0–0 (a.e.t.) (2–4 p)	Colorado Rapids	Carson, California United States
	Gonzalez (yellow card) 41'; Marshall (yellow card) 63'; Magee (yellow card) 109'	Report	Dalby (red card) 36'	Stadium: The Home Depot Center; Attendance: 6,219; Referee: Abiodun Okulaja
	Penalties
	Gordon (penalty scored); Klein (penalty missed); Jordan (penalty scored); Magee (penalty missed)		Cummings (penalty scored); Ballouchy (penalty scored); Clark (penalty scored); Ihemelu (penalty scored)

May 26, 2009 Qualification	Seattle Sounders FC	1–0	Colorado Rapids	Tukwila, Washington United States
	Forrest 62'	Report	Harvey (yellow card) 78'	Stadium: Starfire Sports Complex; Attendance: 4,007; Referee: Tony Russo
