= 2010 North American SuperLiga =

SuperLiga 2010

Tournament details
- Host country: United States
- Dates: July 14 – September 1
- Teams: 8 (from 1 confederation)
- Venues: 4 (in 4 host cities)

Final positions
- Champions: (Mexico) Monarcas Morelia
- Runners-up: (United States) New England Revolution

Tournament statistics
- Matches played: 15
- Goals scored: 34 (2.27 per match)
- Attendance: 149,836 (9,989 per match)
- Top scorer: (Mexico) Miguel Sabah (4 goals)

The 2010 SuperLiga was the fourth and final edition of the SuperLiga competition. The top four overall Major League Soccer teams from the 2009 season not already qualified for the 2010–11 CONCACAF Champions League earned qualification as well as four clubs from the Primera División de México.

== Qualification ==
The teams involved were selected based on qualification rules set by their respective leagues.

On April 28, 2010, Major League Soccer announced that for the 2010 edition the top four teams from the 2009 MLS regular season standings not competing in the 2010–11 CONCACAF Champions League would qualify for SuperLiga 2010.

The Primera División de México announced its participants would be the top four team from the 2009 overall standings (Clausura 2009 and Apertura 2009) that were not competing in the 2010–11 CONCACAF Champions League. Furthermore, América (5th 2009 overall) declined to participate.

The SuperLiga 2010 participants are as follows:

From (United States) Major League Soccer:

- Houston Dynamo (2009 3rd overall)
- Chicago Fire (2009 5th overall)
- Chivas USA (2009 6th overall)
- New England Revolution (2009 7th overall)

From (Mexico) Primera División de México:

- Pachuca (2009 2nd overall)
- Monarcas Morelia (2009 5th overall)
- Puebla (2009 6th overall)
- Pumas UNAM (2009 9th overall)

== Group stage ==
There were two groups of four teams. Each group contained two clubs from each league with the top two teams from each groups advancing to the semifinals.

=== Group A ===
Team	Pld	W	D	L	GF	GA	GD	Pts
(United States) Houston Dynamo	3	2	1	0	4	2	+2	7
(Mexico) Puebla	3	2	0	1	5	3	+2	6
(United States) Chivas USA	3	1	1	1	3	3	0	4
(Mexico) Pachuca	3	0	0	3	2	6	−4	0

July 15, 2010
20:00 EDT

Houston Dynamo (United States)	2–1	(Mexico) Pachuca
Ngwenya 18', 85'	Report	Manso 51'

Robertson Stadium, Houston, Texas
Attendance: 10,400
Referee: Jerry Solis (Costa Rica)

July 15, 2010
22:30 EDT

Chivas USA (United States)	1–2	(Mexico) Puebla
Umaña 85'	Report	Olivera 6'; González 62'

The Home Depot Center, Carson, California
Attendance: 12,617
Referee: José Gaspar Molina (Honduras)

July 18, 2010
20:00 EDT

Houston Dynamo (United States)	1–1	(United States) Chivas USA
Palmer 6'	Report	Padilla 71'

Robertson Stadium, Houston, Texas
Attendance: 5,007

July 18, 2010
22:30 EDT

Pachuca (Mexico)	1–3	(Mexico) Puebla
Arizala 80'	Report	Pereyra 25'; Ortiz 67', 75'

Robertson Stadium, Houston, Texas
Attendance: 5,007

July 21, 2010
20:00 EDT

Houston Dynamo (United States)	1–0	(Mexico) Puebla
Oduro 63'	Report

Robertson Stadium, Houston, Texas
Attendance: 10,033
Referee: Óscar Reyna (Guatemala)

July 21, 2010
22:30 EDT

Chivas USA (United States)	1–0	(Mexico) Pachuca
Maldonado 7'	Report

The Home Depot Center, Carson, California
Attendance: 14,817
Referee: Marlon Mejia (El Salvador)

=== Group B ===
Team	Pld	W	D	L	GF	GA	GD	Pts
(United States) New England Revolution	3	3	0	0	3	0	+3	9
(Mexico) Monarcas Morelia	3	1	1	1	7	4	+3	4
(United States) Chicago Fire	3	1	0	2	2	6	−4	3
(Mexico) Pumas UNAM	3	0	1	2	2	4	−2	1

July 14, 2010
20:00 EDT

New England Revolution (United States)	1–0	(Mexico) Pumas UNAM
Schilawski 18'	Report

Gillette Stadium, Foxborough, Massachusetts
Attendance: 7,201
Referee: Silviu Petrescu (Canada)

July 14, 2010
21:30 EDT

Chicago Fire (United States)	1–5	(Mexico) Monarcas Morelia
Kinney 49'	Report	Hernández 4'; Rey 34'; Sabah 40'; Márquez 50'; Lozano 70'

Toyota Park, Bridgeview, Illinois
Attendance: 11,009
Referee: José Rivera (El Salvador)

July 17, 2010
19:00 EDT

Chicago Fire (United States)	0–1	(United States) New England Revolution
	Report	Perovic 77'

Toyota Park, Bridgeview, Illinois
Attendance: 16,117
Referee: Kevin Stott (United States)

July 17, 2010
21:30 EDT

Monarcas Morelia (Mexico)	2–2	(Mexico) Pumas UNAM
Rey 2'; Droguett 53'	Report	Augusto 68'; Cortés 85'

Toyota Park, Bridgeview, Illinois
Attendance: 16,117
Referee: Ricardo Arellano (Mexico)

July 20, 2010
20:00 EDT

New England Revolution (United States)	1–0	(Mexico) Monarcas Morelia
Perović 62'	Report

Gillette Stadium, Foxborough, Massachusetts
Attendance: 8,173
Referee: Elmer Rodas (Guatemala)

July 20, 2010
21:30 EDT

Chicago Fire (United States)	1–0	(Mexico) Pumas UNAM
Conde 35'	Report

Toyota Park, Bridgeview, Illinois
Attendance: 9,429
Referee: Jose Pineda (Honduras)

== Knockout round ==
=== Bracket ===
Semi-finals
August 4 – Foxborough, MA
(United States) New England Revolution (p)	1 (5)
(Mexico) Puebla	1 (3)
August 5 – Houston, TX
(United States) Houston Dynamo	0
(Mexico) Monarcas Morelia	1

Final
September 1 – Foxborough, MA
(United States) New England Revolution	1
(Mexico) Monarcas Morelia	2

=== Semi-finals ===
August 4, 2010
19:00 EDT

New England Revolution (United States)	1–1	(Mexico) Puebla
Mansally 56'	Report	Olivera 58'
Penalties
Joseph (penalty scored); Reis (penalty scored); Tierney (penalty scored); Phelan (penalty scored); Mansally (penalty scored)	5–3	(penalty scored) Olivera; (penalty scored) Juárez; (penalty scored) Ayala; (penalty missed) Lugo

Gillette Stadium, Foxborough, Massachusetts
Attendance: 5,854
Referee: Roberto Moreno (Panama)

August 5, 2010
20:00 EDT

Houston Dynamo (United States)	0–1	(Mexico) Monarcas Morelia
	Report	Sabah 47'

Robertson Stadium, Houston, Texas
Attendance: 7,641
Referee: Wálter Quesada (Costa Rica)

=== Final ===
September 1, 2010
19:00 EDT

New England Revolution (United States)	1–2	(Mexico) Monarcas Morelia
Alston 79'	Report	Sabah 65' (pen.), 75'

Gillette Stadium, Foxborough, Massachusetts
Attendance: 10,414
Referee: Carlos Batres (Guatemala)

2010 SuperLiga champions
(Mexico)
Monarcas Morelia
1st title

== Goalscorers ==
4 goals

- (Mexico) Miguel Sabah ( (Mexico) Monarcas Morelia)

2 goals

- (Zimbabwe) Joseph Ngwenya ( (United States) Houston Dynamo)
- (Uruguay) Nicolás Olivera ( (Mexico) Puebla)
- (Mexico) Mario Ortiz ( (Mexico) Puebla)
- (Serbia) Marko Perović ( (United States) New England Revolution)
- (Colombia) Luis Gabriel Rey ( (Mexico) Monarcas Morelia)

1 goal

- (United States) Kevin Alston ( (United States) New England Revolution)
- (Colombia) Franco Arizala ( (Mexico) Pachuca)
- (Mexico) Leandro Augusto ( (Mexico) Pumas UNAM)
- (Colombia) Wiliam Conde ( (United States) Chicago Fire)
- (Mexico) Javier Cortés ( (Mexico) Pumas UNAM)
- (Chile) Hugo Droguett ( (Mexico) Monarcas Morelia)
- (Uruguay) Álvaro Fabián González ( (Mexico) Puebla)
- (Mexico) Elías Hernández ( (Mexico) Monarcas Morelia)
- (United States) Steven Kinney ( (United States) Chicago Fire)
- (Mexico) Jaime Lozano ( (Mexico) Monarcas Morelia)
- (Mexico) Rafael Márquez Lugo ( (Mexico) Monarcas Morelia)
- (Venezuela) Giancarlo Maldonado ( (United States) Chivas USA)
- (The Gambia) Kenny Mansally ( (United States) New England Revolution)
- (Argentina) Damián Manso ( (Mexico) Pachuca)
- (Ghana) Dominic Oduro ( (United States) Houston Dynamo)
- (Mexico) Jesús Padilla ( (United States) Chivas USA)
- (Jamaica) Lovel Palmer ( (United States) Houston Dynamo)
- (Argentina) Gabriel Pereyra ( (Mexico) Puebla)
- (United States) Zack Schilawski ( (United States) New England Revolution)
- (Costa Rica) Michael Umaña ( (United States) Chivas USA)
