= Ilija Stolica =

Serbian football manager and player (born 1978)

Personal information
- Date of birth: 7 July 1978 (age 48)
- Place of birth: Zemun, SFR Yugoslavia
- Height: 1.86 m (6 ft 1 in)
- Position: Forward

Youth career
- –1997: Zemun

Senior career*
Years	Team	Apps	(Gls)
1997–1998	Zemun	24	(5)
1998–1999	Lleida	18	(2)
1999–2000	Zemun	24	(5)
2000–2001	Partizan	4	(0)
2001–2002	Zemun	35	(25)
2003–2004	Metalurh Donetsk	26	(8)
2005	OFK Beograd	11	(6)
2005–2007	Sint-Truiden	44	(10)
2007–2008	Mons	42	(10)
2009	OFI	10	(1)
2010	Budućnost Podgorica	10	(4)
2010–2011	New England Revolution	16	(4)
2011	→ FC New York (loan)	1	(0)
Total		259	(80)

International career
1999	FR Yugoslavia U21 (Note: Official UEFA matches only)	3	(0)

Managerial career
- 2015: Partizan (assistant)
- 2015–2016: Serbia U17
- 2016–2017: Voždovac
- 2017–2018: Vojvodina
- 2018: Olimpija Ljubljana
- 2019–2021: Serbia U21
- 2021: Serbia (caretaker)
- 2022: Partizan
- 2023–2024: Trenčín
- * Club domestic league appearances and goals

Ilija Stolica (Serbian Cyrillic: Илија Столица; born 7 July 1978) is a Serbian football manager and former player.

== Club career ==
Due to his promising performances at Zemun, Stolica earned a transfer to Spanish club Lleida in 1998. He played one season in Spain's second division, but failed to score in 18 games and eventually returned to his parent club.

In 2000, Stolica signed a contract with Partizan. He, however, failed to make an impact with the Crno-beli and returned to Zemun the following year. By the end of the 2001–02 season, Stolica became the league's second-highest scorer with 19 goals.

In the 2003 winter transfer window, Stolica was transferred to Ukrainian club Metalurh Donetsk. He managed to play only 20 league games over the next two years, before returning to his homeland and joining OFK Beograd.

Between 2005 and 2008, Stolica spent three seasons in Belgium. He played for Sint-Truidense and Mons, scoring 20 goals combined. He subsequently had two unassuming spells in Greece and Montenegro.

In March 2006, while at Sint-Truidense, Stolica and two other players were questioned by the police as part of an investigation into match-fixing.

=== New England Revolution ===
On 30 July 2010, Stolica signed with Major League Soccer club New England Revolution. He made his Revolution debut on 7 August, coming on as a 73rd minute substitute for Zack Schilawski in a 1-0 win over D.C. United. He made his first start the following week and scored his first Revolution goal, a game-winning effort against FC Dallas on 14 August.

He scored twice more in the remainder of the 2010 New England Revolution season; on 28 August in a 2-1 loss to the Philadelphia Union, and on 22 September against FC Dallas. He recorded his first Revolution assist on 4 September, setting up Kheli Dube's goal in a 3-1 win over Seattle Sounders FC. He played the entirety of the 2010 North American SuperLiga final.

Stolica made only 2 appearances in the 2011 New England Revolution season, scoring one goal, a 93rd minute equaling effort against Vancouver Whitecaps FC on 6 April.

In April 2011, Stolica was loaned to USL Pro team FC New York.

On 30 June, the Revolution declined Stolica's contract.

== International career ==
At international level, Stolica was capped for FR Yugoslavia U21, making three appearances during the qualifications for the 2000 UEFA European Under-21 Championship.

== Managerial career ==
In November 2016, Stolica was appointed as manager of Serbian SuperLiga club Voždovac. He resigned from his position in December 2017, only to take over as manager of Vojvodina later that month.

In October 2019, Stolica was named as manager of the Serbia under-21s, taking over the team from Nenad Milovanović after poor start to the qualifications for the 2021 UEFA European Under-21 Championship.

== Managerial statistics ==
Updated 11 August 2024

Managerial record by team and tenure
Team	From	To	Record				
Team	From	To	P	W	D	L	Win %
Serbia U17	1 January 2015	10 November 2016	18	8	3	7	44.44
Voždovac	9 November 2016	31 December 2017	46	20	10	16	43.48
Vojvodina	1 January 2018	4 April 2018	8	2	2	4	25.00
Olimpija Ljubljana	11 June 2018	31 July 2018	5	1	2	2	20.00
Serbia U21	7 October 2019	15 October 2021	14	5	4	5	35.71
Serbia (caretaker)	January 2021	March 2021	2	0	2	0	0.00
Partizan	8 June 2022	12 August 2022	6	1	3	2	16.67
Trenčin	26 May 2023	Present	36	15	11	10	41.67
Total			134	52	36	46	38.81
