= Marko Perović (footballer, born 1984) =

Serbian footballer

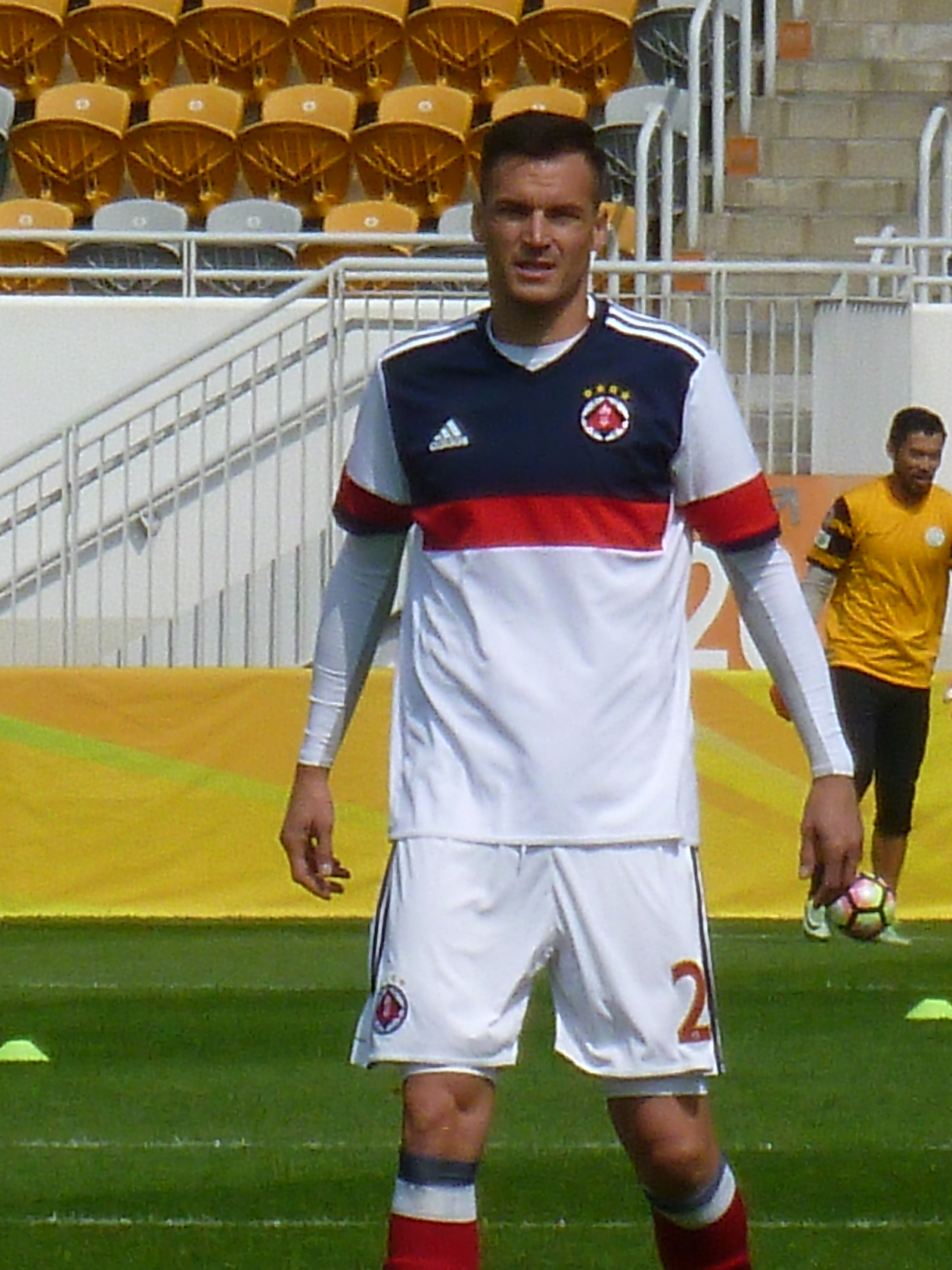
- Perović in 2017

Personal information
- Date of birth: 11 January 1984 (age 42)
- Place of birth: Kosovo Polje, SR Serbia, Yugoslavia
- Height: 1.85 m (6 ft 1 in)
- Position: Left winger

Youth career
- Priština
- Red Star Belgrade

Senior career*
Years	Team	Apps	(Gls)
2002–2008	Red Star Belgrade	90	(10)
2003	→ Jedinstvo Ub (loan)	14	(8)
2008	→ Basel (loan)	12	(2)
2008–2009	Basel	28	(8)
2009	Basel U21	3	(2)
2010–2011	New England Revolution	29	(7)
2012	Red Star Belgrade	2	(0)
2012–2013	Persepolis	13	(2)
2013	OFK Beograd	3	(0)
2014	Chainat Hornbill	12	(1)
2014	Radnički Kragujevac	9	(0)
2015	Sime Darby	28	(8)
2016	Operário	6	(0)
2017	South China	9	(5)
2017	R&F	2	(1)
2018	Guangzhou R&F	0	(0)

International career
2004–2006	Serbia U21	7	(1)

Managerial career
- 2019–2020: Guangzhou R&F Reserves (assistant)
- 2020–2021: Inđija (assistant)
- 2021–2022: Serbia (assistant)
- 2022–2023: China U23 (assistant)
- 2023–: China (assistant)
- * Club domestic league appearances and goals

Marko Perović (Serbian Cyrillic: Марко Перовић, pronounced [mâːrko pěroʋitɕ]; born 11 January 1984) is a Serbian football coach and former player who is the assistant coach of China national team.

== Club career ==
=== Red Star Belgrade ===
Perović came through the ranks of KF Prishtina before moving to Red Star Belgrade. He made an impact at Red Star, proving to be an energetic and skillful player. However, in May 2007 he fractured his tibia in the second-last game of the season against Mladost Apatin. Following his recovery he played only in a few games.

=== FC Basel ===
During the winter break of their 2007–08 season FC Basel reached an agreement with Red Star to loan the former captain of the Serbian U21 national team until the end of the season and in the contract was the option of a definitely signing. On 31 January 2008, Perović signed the loan contract. Perović played his domestic league debut for his new club in the home game in the St. Jakob-Park on 9 February, coming on as a substitute for Scott Chipperfield. He scored his first goal for the team in the same game as Basel won 3–0 over Neuchâtel Xamax. He had 15 appearances up until the end of the season, including one UEFA Cup and two Swiss Cup games, three times in the starting 11, the rest as substitute. At the end of the 2007–08 season he won the Double with the club. They won the League Championship title with four points advantage over second placed Young Boys. In the Swiss Cup Basel advanced to the final, winning this 4–1 against AC Bellinzona they won the competition.

Basel pulled the buy-out option and on 2 June it was announced that Perović had signed a permanent three-year contract with them. To the beginning of the 2008–09 season he was member of the Basel team that won the Uhrencup. They beat Legia Warsaw 6–1 and played a 2–2 draw with Borussia Dortmund to end the table on top slot above Dortmund and Luzern. He scored on his full Basel league debut, in a 2–1 away win over BSC Young Boys on 18 July. He followed up the next week by scoring the winner in a 1–0 home win over Grasshopper Club Zürich and was also named as Man of the Match in that game. Basel joined the 2008–09 UEFA Champions League in the second qualifying round and with an aggregate score of 5–3 they eliminated IFK Göteborg. In the next round they played against Vitória de Guimarães. The first leg ended in a goalless draw, but with a 2–1 win in the second leg they eliminated Vitória and advanced to the group stage. Here Basel were matched with Barcelona, Sporting CP and Shakhtar Donetsk, but ended the group in last position winning just one point after a 1–1 draw in Camp Nou. Perović had six appearances during these ten matches.

At the end of the 2008–09 Super League season Basel were third in the table, seven points behind new champions Zürich and one adrift of runners-up Young Boys. Perović had 27 league appearances In the 2008–09 Swiss Cup Basel advanced via Schötz, Bulle, Thun and Zurich to the semi-finals. But here they were stopped by YB. After a goalless 90 minutes and extra time, YB decided the penalty shoot-out 3–2 and advanced to the final to become runners-up, as Sion became cup winners.

In their following season under new head coach Thorsten Fink Perović saw little first-team football and he was demoted to the U-21 reserve team. During the winter break of that season Perović left the club. During his two years with the club, Perović played a total of 86 games for Basel scoring a total of 15 goals. 40 of these games were in the Swiss Super League, four in the Swiss Cup, nine in the UEFA competitions (Champions League UEFA Cup and Europa League) and 33 were friendly games. He scored ten goals in the domestic league, one in the cup and the other four were scored during the test games.

=== New England Revolution ===
==== 2010 Season ====
The 2009–10 FC Basel season saw Perović play just 12 minutes of football under Thorsten Fink, and in January 2010, at the suggestion of his agent, Perovic agreed to trail with Major League Soccer side New England Revolution.

Revolution General Manager Mike Burns said on March 19, 2010, that the Revolution were attempting to make a deal happen with Perovic.

Perović noted that he'd never considered moving to MLS before his agent's suggestion. In an interview with the Revolution, he noted several challenges he faced when coming to the league, including the language barrier and travel. MLS travel included long plane flights, with which he had no familiarity, as his former teams traveled primarily by bus. He cited the outreach and support of his teammates as factors that helped him settle in.

After a successful trial, and a successful pre-season stint which included two friendlies, the New England Revolution elected to sign Perović. Basel committed to a free transfer.

After squaring away his P-1 visa and contract situation with Basel, Perović signed with New England on 26 March 2010, the same day the Revolution announced the return of winger Khano Smith. He made his MLS debut as a substitute in the second half of the Revolution's 4–1 victory over Toronto FC on 10 April 2010.

Deployed at left wing, Perović scored his first goal for the Revs, a "dazzling" 30-yard free kick, on 24 April 2010, against the eventual MLS Cup champion Colorado Rapids at Gillette Stadium in front of a crowd of 8,142. It was the Revolution's first set piece goal of the season.

Perović scored his second goal for the Revolution on 29 May 2010, in the 8th minute against the New York Red Bulls. Though the Revolution would go on to win the game 3–2, the game is most remembered for the broken fibula suffered by starting goalkeeper Preston Burpo in a collision with New York's Dane Richards.

Perović truly began to shine during the month of July. During a five-game stretch from 10–31 July, he scored four of the Revolution's six goals while assisting on another, scored by Zack Schilawski. These included a 67th minute game winner against the LA Galaxy on 10 July, and an equalizer against the Philadelphia Union in the Revolution's first-ever trip to PPL Park on 31 July. On the 17 and 20 July, in SuperLiga Group B play, Perović scored on the Chicago Fire and Monarcas Morelia. His goal against the Galaxy proved to be the first goal for the Revolution in 347 minutes of open play.

Perović concluded the 2010 season as the Revolution's top scorer, with 6 regular season goals (8 across all competitions), and an additional 3 assists. He was voted 2010 Team MVP on 16 October.

In his only full season with the Revolution, Perović led the team in scoring with eight goals in all competitions and was named the club's Most Valuable Player for the 2010 season. He was noted for his attacking play and proficiency at scoring from free kicks.

==== 2011 Season, Injury, Contract Disputes ====
Perović's first goal of the 2011 season also proved to be his last for the club. Assisted by Benny Feilhaber (In Benny's league debut), in the 12th minute, he curled a 25-yard ball past Kansas City's on 23 April 2011. This goal snapped the Revolution's 192 minute scoreless streak.

Perović was subbed off in the 60th minute of the same game with a left knee injury. Though nothing serious was apparent at the time of the injury, it was later determined to have aggravated a previous condition. The injury resulted in major surgery "requiring surgeons to reconstruct his left ACL, repair a medial meniscus tear and perform a chondroplasty on his medial femoral condyle." This effectively ended Marko's season, as it was learned he would miss 6–9 months due to the gravity of the procedure

Almost a month after surgery, New England declined on their option to extend Perović's contract on 1 July 2011.

The announcement led to controversy and some backlash from fans and Perović. The Revolution were in the midst of what would become their worst season in club history and had limited attacking options. Marko had two and a half years left on his contract at the time of his injury, but The Revolution were insistent that Marko had specifically asked for his option to be dropped. In an interview with fan blog The Bent Musket, Perović denied this, stating:

"I only have to tell you that I had a contract with the club and the deal would not comply. Took advantage of what I had hurt and offered me conditions that were not in agreement, this is blackmail, because I do not have the right to negotiate as an injured player... "Wanted more link to me for a year. All the players at the club know that I came here because my half of the money given to FC Basel and was now turn to New England to regulate."

Though the situation remains unclear, the blog speculates that Perović may have asked for his option to be dropped so that he could renegotiate his contract in hopes of a raise, coming off his stellar 2010 season, and this may have led to a misunderstanding with the club.

Perović's additional statements, such as "All players know what is happening at the club" and "I know how all club functions. P[a]triots club is the only important." and "In any case [people] here are not thinking for the future," led fans to believe that the organization had in fact cut him without thought of renegotiating his deal. These statements were compounded by prior states from Revolution players like Jeff Larentowicz, who had stated "[In New England] we had a great practice field and locker room, but we were, rightfully so, second fiddle to [the Patriots]." Despite the contentious words, Perović signed off with a positive note, saying "The whole truth is that I love Boston, club and fans and I wanted to stay here [for my entire career]."

Though he'd return for a trial in January 2014 as an unsigned free agent, he would make no more appearances for the Revolution.

=== Red Star Belgrade ===
On 16 December 2011, he returned to Red Star Belgrade.

He signed a contract with Iranian side Persepolis on 20 December 2012 but he was released at the end of the season.

=== R&F ===
On 27 July 2017, it was reported that Perović had agreed to join Hong Kong Premier League club R&F. He had arrived in Hong Kong only seven months earlier and spent the past half season at South China.

=== Guangzhou R&F ===
In January 2018, Perović joined R&F's mother team Guangzhou R&F in the Chinese Super League.

== International career ==
Perović was also a member of the Serbia U21. He broke his leg in May 2007 against Mladost Apatin during Red Star's second-last game of the season. This injury caused him to miss the 2007 UEFA European Under-21 Championship, in which Serbia eventually reached the final, losing to the Netherlands.

== Honours ==
Red Star Belgrade

- Serbian SuperLiga: 2003–04, 2005–06, 2006–07
- Serbian Cup: 2003–04, 2005–06, 2006–07, 2011–12

FC Basel

- Swiss Super League: 2007–08
- Swiss Cup: 2007–08

Persepolis

- Hazfi Cup runner-up: 2012–13

Individual

- New England Revolution Most Valuable Player: 2010
