= Cory Gibbs =

American soccer player (born 1980)

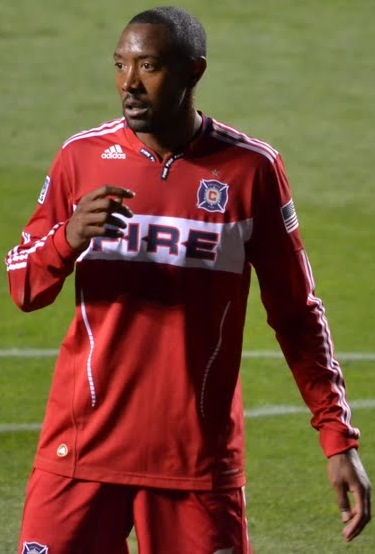
- Gibbs playing for Chicago Fire in 2011

Personal information
- Date of birth: January 14, 1980 (age 46)
- Place of birth: Fort Lauderdale, Florida, U.S.
- Height: 6 ft 3 in (1.91 m)
- Position: Defender

College career
Years	Team	Apps	(Gls)
1998–2001	Brown Bears		

Senior career*
Years	Team	Apps	(Gls)
2000	Palm Beach Pumas		
2001–2003	FC St. Pauli	60	(4)
2004	Dallas Burn	21	(0)
2004–2006	Feyenoord	15	(1)
2005–2006	→ ADO Den Haag (loan)	5	(0)
2006–2008	Charlton Athletic	0	(0)
2008–2009	Colorado Rapids	29	(1)
2010	New England Revolution	25	(0)
2011–2012	Chicago Fire	29	(3)
Total		184	(9)

International career
1999	United States U20	1	(0)
2003–2006	United States	19	(0)
Medal record
Representing United States
Third place	CONCACAF Gold Cup	2003
Men's Soccer
- * Club domestic league appearances and goals

Cory Gibbs (born January 14, 1980) is an American former soccer player. A defender, played professionally for clubs in Germany, the Netherlands and England. He also played 19 international matches for the U.S. national soccer team, including at the 2003 CONCACAF Gold Cup.

== Career ==
=== College and amateur ===
Gibbs was born in Fort Lauderdale, Florida. He played college soccer at Brown University, joining the team in 1997. During his career, Brown won three Ivy League Championships and participated in the NCAA Tournament all four years. In 2000, Gibbs led Brown to an Ivy League championship and the Elite Eight of the NCAA Tournament. He was named Ivy League Player of the Year, and a First-Team All-American. In 2000, he spent the collegiate off season with the Palm Beach Pumas of the Premier Development League. He was also one of three Brown soccer players, including Matthew Cross (Kansas City Wizards) and Scott Powers (Columbus Crew), to be drafted in the 2001 MLS SuperDraft.

=== Professional ===
==== Germany ====
After graduating from Brown in 2001, Gibbs decided not to play in MLS and joined FC St. Pauli of the Bundesliga. He played 25 games for St. Pauli that season, becoming the youngest American to score a goal in the Bundesliga with a goal against FC Cologne. He was also a part of the side that beat the world champions Bayern Munich, a result that earned St. Pauli the nickname of weltpokalsiegerbesieger, translated as World Club Championship Winner Beaters. St. Pauli was relegated to the 2. Bundesliga after the 2001–02 season, and Gibbs played an equally important role with the team in his second season as in his first. St. Pauli, however, was relegated again after the 2002–03 season, this time to the Regionalliga Nord, the German third division. Gibbs remained with the team, being moved from central defense to defensive midfielder.

Gibbs decided to leave St. Pauli during 2003 due to the low level of play and lack of exposure needed to secure a spot on the United States national team. A move to Jahn Regensburg of the 2. Bundesliga fell through.

==== MLS ====
Gibbs returned to the United States and play in Major League Soccer, where he would be easily visible and available for international matches. Although the Columbus Crew initially tried to acquire Gibbs, he eventually ended up with FC Dallas, then known as the Dallas Burn. Gibbs was a starter in every game for which he was available during his stint with Dallas. He made a total of 21 appearances.

==== Europe ====
On January 20, 2005, the Dutch club Feyenoord agreed on a transfer with MLS, and Gibbs signed a four-and-a-half-year contract with the club. In his first season, he made 15 appearances and scored one goal.

After injuring his knee in a U.S. national team friendly against England on May 28, 2005, Gibbs rehabbed, under the direction of Dr. Daniel Kalbac in Miami, Florida, and came back from his injury on January 19, 2006. On January 24, 2006, Feyenoord loaned Gibbs to ADO Den Haag for the remainder of the season.

Gibbs signed a pre-contract agreement with English Premier League club Charlton Athletic in May 2006 just before Alan Curbishley's departure. After a short stay at Charlton it was announced that he would leave June 30, 2008, at the end of his contract. He never played a match for Charlton due to injuries.

==== Return to MLS ====
Gibbs moved to MLS. It was expected that he would be selected by the Galaxy, who had first option to pick up his contract in the allocation listings, but he was selected by Colorado after the Galaxy passed on Gibbs in order to be able to pick Eddie Lewis.

==== New England Revolution ====
On January 22, 2010, Colorado sent Gibbs, Preston Burpo, allocation money, and a third-round pick in the 2011 MLS SuperDraft in exchange for the rights to Jeff Larentowicz and Wells Thompson. Gibbs made his Revolution debut, and first Revolution start, in the 2010 New England Revolution season opener, a 1-0 loss to the LA Galaxy on March 27. He made his home debut on April 10 in a 4-1 win over Toronto FC. In the absence of Shalrie Joseph due to injury and personal issues, Gibbs captained the Revolution for the first two months of the season. Gibbs finished the 2010 season third in minutes-played on the Revolution, recording 25 starts. He helped the Revolution reach the 2010 North American SuperLiga and started in the final.

==== Later career ====
Gibbs was selected by the Chicago Fire with the seventh pick of the MLS Re-Entry Draft on December 15, 2010. He agreed terms with the club the same day. At the end of the 2011 Chicago Fire season, he was named the club's Defender of the Year.

After starting in the first three games of the 2012 season, Gibbs suffered an injury, tearing his meniscus on April 4, 2012. After missing the rest of the 2012 season, he announced his retirement from the game on November 26, 2012.

=== International ===
Gibbs's return to the U.S. helped his national team career, as he received frequent callups for 2006 FIFA World Cup qualifiers. Gibbs solidified his position as one of U.S.'s top central defenders. Since making his first full international appearance June 8, 2003, in a friendly against New Zealand, Gibbs received 19 caps.

Gibbs was initially a part of the United States' 2006 FIFA World Cup team, but he reinjured his right knee in a friendly with Morocco on May 23, 2006, and was replaced by Gregg Berhalter. Gibbs played only 45 minutes all season for Charlton's reserves following surgery to repair cartilage in his knee. Gibbs returned to international soccer when he was selected by Bob Bradley for the United States' March 26 match against Poland.

== Personal ==
Gibbs was married to former Misteeq band member Zena McNally from July 2008 until their divorce in 2014.

He is married to Paramount CBS Sports Talent Manager Jenna Medvigy. They married in July 2024 and have one son together .

Gibbs also runs a soccer camp named 'Cory Gibbs StarSoccer', which takes place every summer in the United States.

== Career statistics ==
=== Club ===
Appearances and goals by club, season and competition
Club	Season	League			National Cup		League Cup		Continental		Total	
Club	Season	Division	Apps	Goals	Apps	Goals	Apps	Goals	Apps	Goals	Apps	Goals
FC St. Pauli	2001–02	Bundesliga	25	1	0	0	0	0	0	0	25	1
FC St. Pauli	2002–03	2. Bundesliga	21	0	0	0	0	0	0	0	21	0
FC St. Pauli	2003–04	Regionalliga	14	3	0	0	0	0	0	0	14	3
FC St. Pauli	Total		60	4	0	0	0	0	0	0	60	4
Dallas Burn	2004	Major League Soccer	21	2	3	0	0	0	0	0	24	2
Feyenoord	2004–05	Eredivisie	15	1	0	0	0	0	0	0	15	1
ADO Den Haag (loan)	2005–06	Eredivisie	5	0	0	0	0	0	0	0	5	0
Charlton Athletic	2006–07	Premier League	0	0	0	0	0	0	0	0	0	0
Charlton Athletic	2007–08	Championship	0	0	0	0	0	0	0	0	0	0
Charlton Athletic	Total		0	0	0	0	0	0	0	0	0	0
Colorado Rapids	2008	Major League Soccer	9	1	0	0	0	0	0	0	9	1
Colorado Rapids	2009	Major League Soccer	20	0	0	0	0	0	0	0	20	0
Colorado Rapids	Total		29	1	0	0	0	0	0	0	29	1
New England Revolution	2010	Major League Soccer	25	0	0	0	0	0	0	0	25	0
Chicago Fire	2011	Major League Soccer	26	3	4	0	0	0	0	0	30	3
Chicago Fire	2012	Major League Soccer	3	0	0	0	0	0	0	0	3	0
Chicago Fire	Total		29	3	4	0	0	0	0	0	33	3
Career total			184	9	7	0	0	0	0	0	191	9

=== International ===
Appearances and goals by national team and year
National team	Year	Apps	Goals
United States	2003	7	0
United States	2004	7	0
United States	2005	3	0
United States	2006	2	0
Total		19	0
