= Joseph Niouky =

Senegalese footballer (born 1986)

Personal information
- Full name: Louis Joseph Desire Niouky
- Date of birth: March 26, 1986 (age 40)
- Place of birth: Pikine, Senegal
- Height: 1.80 m (5 ft 11 in)
- Position: Midfielder

Team information
- Current team: Jersey Express
- Number: 22

Senior career*
Years	Team	Apps	(Gls)
2003–2006	ASC Diaraf		
2006–2010	Port Autonome		
2010	New England Revolution	13	(0)
2011–	Jersey Express	26	(1)
- * Club domestic league appearances and goals as of July 1, 2012

Joseph Niouky (born March 28, 1986, in Pikine) is a Senegalese footballer who currently plays for Jersey Express in the USL Premier Development League.

== Club career ==
=== Senegal ===
Niouky began his career with ASC Diaraf in Senegal, with whom he played for four seasons. He moved to top Senegalese side Port Autonome in 2006, where he established himself as one of the league's top central midfield players.

=== United States ===
On February 23, 2010, the New England Revolution officially announced the signing of Niouky, as an addition to their midfield. On August 11, 2010, Niouky was released by the Revolution, nearly six months after signing with the club, having played in just 13 MLS games.

Having been unable to secure a contract with a professional club elsewhere, Niouky signed to play with Jersey Express in the USL Premier Development League in 2011. He made his debut for the team on May 14, 2011. in their 2011 season opener, a 3–0 win over the Westchester Flames.
