= Jason Griffiths =

English footballer (born 1987)

Personal information
- Date of birth: 22 March 1987 (age 39)
- Place of birth: Bracknell, England
- Position: Midfielder

Youth career
- 2006–2009: Kentucky Wildcats

Senior career*
| Years | Team | Apps | (Gls) |
| 2003–2005 | Beaconsfield SYCOB | | |
| 2009 | Des Moines Menace | 4 | (1) |
| 2010 | New England Revolution | 10 | (0) |
- * Club domestic league appearances and goals as of 26 September 2010

Jason Griffiths (born 22 March 1987 in Bracknell) is an English footballer.

== Career ==
Griffiths played college soccer at University of Kentucky from 2006 to 2009, where he appeared in 65 games with 64 starts in his Kentucky career, earning all-region honors as a senior. Griffiths finished his career with 12 goals and 10 assists, netting two game-winning goals. Griffiths was also a perfect 8-for-8 in penalty-kick goals in the regular season in his decorated four-year career. During the 2009 season, Griffiths ranked second on the team with three goals, adding one assist. Before his college career, Griffiths had spent three seasons playing for Southern Football League club Beaconsfield SYCOB.

During his college years Griffiths also played for Des Moines Menace in the USL Premier Development League.

Prior to College, Jason was part of the Pass4Soccer Network Program that organised the trials he was spotted at in the UK.

=== Professional ===
Griffiths was drafted in the third round (48th overall) of the 2010 MLS SuperDraft by New England Revolution.

He didn't sign with the club immediately, but after training with the club over the months was eventually signed by New England Revolution on 24 June 2010. He was released by the club in January 2011 during their pre-season camp.

=== Coaching ===
Griffiths returned to the University of Kentucky as a student assistant coach in August 2011.
