= Chris Tierney (soccer) =

American soccer player

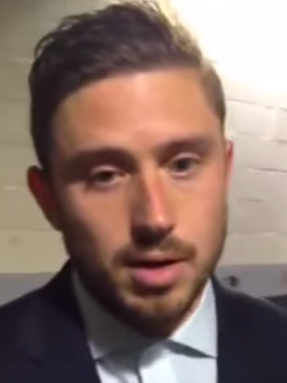
- Chris Tierney in 2015.

Personal information
- Full name: Christopher Wheeler Tierney
- Date of birth: January 9, 1986 (age 40)
- Place of birth: Wellesley, Massachusetts, U.S.
- Height: 6 ft 0 in (1.83 m)
- Position: Left back

College career
| Years | Team | Apps | (Gls) |
| 2004–2007 | Virginia Cavaliers | 79 | (11) |

Senior career*
| Years | Team | Apps | (Gls) |
| 2008–2018 | New England Revolution | 246 | (13) |
- * Club domestic league appearances and goals

Christopher Wheeler Tierney (born January 9, 1986) is an American former professional soccer player, who is the current General Manager and Chief Soccer Officer for the New England Revolution. He spent his entire 11-year career in Major League Soccer with the Revolution, primarily as a defender. Tierney scored 13 goals, including one at MLS Cup 2014, and contributed 40 assists in 245 appearances.

Following his retirement Tierney has remained a member of the Revolution as an executive where is their current general manager and Chief Soccer Officer.

== Career ==
=== College ===
After playing high school soccer at the Noble and Greenough School in Dedham, Massachusetts, Tierney played college soccer at the University of Virginia, appearing in 79 games with the Cavaliers, starting 38, and scoring 11 goals and adding 16 assists in his four-year career. As a senior, he scored a career-high seven goals, and assisted on seven more, helping his team to advance to the NCAA College Cup in 2006 for the first time since 1997. Tierney also played club soccer in the Boston Bolts youth program, under New England assistant coach Paul Mariner.

=== Professional ===
Tierney was drafted in the first round (13th overall) in the 2008 MLS Supplemental Draft. He made his full professional debut for Revolution on July 1, 2008, registering two assists in a US Open Cup third-round game against Richmond Kickers. He also played in the final of the 2008 SuperLiga, in which Revolution beat Houston Dynamo on penalty kicks after a 2–2 tie; Tierney scored one of the shootout goals.

Tierney became a regular starter for the Revolution during the 2010 season, starting in a variety of positions across the Revs' midfield and back line, including left back, center-back, right back, left midfielder, center defensive midfielder, center midfielder, and center attacking midfielder. He scored his first professional goal on September 4, 2010, in a match against Seattle Sounders FC. The goal tied the game at 1, and New England went on to win 3–1. In 2012, he scored two goals and tied Kelyn Rowe for most assists on the team with five. The following year he scored two goals and five assists while also claiming two team of the week honors in both week 13 and 18. However he missed that year’s postseason due to injury.

He scored the goal to tie it 1–1 in the 2014 MLS Cup Final and five goals during the regular season. Tierney is known for his accurate and fast crosses, whipped in from the left.

In 2015, Tierney was selected as an MLS All-Star. He also won team of the week honors following the Revolution’s March 28, game vs. San Jose where he scored a goal and assist. In total he scored two goals and was tied for second on the team with a career best six assists.

During the 2016 season Tierney apparently in 28 games where he scored two goals and three assists along with leading all MLS defenders with 43 chances created. He also helped lead the Revolution to the 2016 US Open Cup Final. At the end of the year he was named the Midnight Riders Man of the Year for and voted the clubs defender of the year.

During week 29 of the 2017 season Tierney won team of the week honors after tallying two assists vs. Toronto F.C. That year he recorded one goal and five assists.

He missed most of the 2018 season due to an ACL injury. During that season Tierney won MLS team of week honors for week two after scoring the game winning stoppage time free kick vs. the Colorado Rapids.

On November 15, 2018, Tierney announced his decision to retire from playing professional soccer. He had appeared in 273 total matches for the Revolution, scoring 13 goals and earning 40 assists. At the time of his retirement he was the longest-tenured outfield player in Revolution history with 11 seasons of service. He finished his career with the Revolution in the top four in the club history in multiple major statistical categories, including games played (third, 246), games started (fourth, 220), minutes played (fourth, 19,422), assists (tied-fourth, 40), and game-winning assists (second, 16).

== Post playing career ==
Following his retirement Tierney was hired as the New England Revolutions Player Recruitment Manager from a position he held from 2019 to 2022. In 2022, he was promoted to club’s Director of Soccer Operations, then on January 8, 2024, he was named the clubs Assistant Sporting Director. On June 26, Tierney received yet another promotion where he now serves as the clubs General Manager and Chief Soccer Officer.

== Personal life ==
Tierney is married to his wife Eliza, they reside in Charleston, Massachusetts with their two children.

== Honors ==
New England Revolution

- North American SuperLiga: 2008

Individual

- MLS All-Star: 2015
- Midnight Riders Man of the Year: 2016
- New England Revolution Defender of the Year: 2016
- New England Revolution All-Time Team: 2020
