= Preston Burpo =

American soccer player (born 1972)

Personal information
- Full name: Preston Burpo
- Date of birth: September 26, 1972 (age 54)
- Place of birth: Bethesda, Maryland, U.S.
- Height: 6 ft 3 in (1.91 m)
- Position: Goalkeeper

College career
Years	Team	Apps	(Gls)
1992–1995	Southern New Hampshire Penmen		

Senior career*
Years	Team	Apps	(Gls)
1995	Boston Storm		
1996	New Hampshire Phantoms		
1996–1997	Harbour View		
1997–2005	Seattle Sounders	143	(0)
2006–2007	Chivas USA	22	(0)
2008	San Jose Earthquakes	0	(0)
2008–2009	Colorado Rapids	24	(0)
2010	New England Revolution	11	(0)
Total		200	(0)

Managerial career
- 2012: Montreal Impact (goalkeeping coach)
- 2013–2014: D.C. United (goalkeeping coach)
- 2016–2020: New York Red Bulls (goalkeeping coach)
- 2021–: Austin FC (goalkeeping coach)
- * Club domestic league appearances and goals

Preston Burpo (born September 26, 1972) is an American retired soccer player who is currently the goalkeeper coach for Austin FC in Major League Soccer.

== College ==
Burpo played collegiate soccer at Southern New Hampshire University from 1992 to 1995. During his career there he earned a goals against average of 1.19 and recorded 38 shutouts. He was the first Penman to earn All-Region honors in 1992.

== Playing career ==
Upon graduating in 1995 he had brief stints with New Hampshire Phantoms and Boston Storm of the USISL, and also played briefly with the Jamaican club team Harbor View FC. In 1997, he signed with Seattle Sounders of the USL First Division where he would play for the next nine years. During his career with the Sounders, Burpo appeared 143 times, notching 38 shutouts, 631 saves, and a GAA of 1.19 along the way.

On March 17, 2006, Burpo signed his first contract with Major League Soccer to play for C.D. Chivas USA. On November 26, 2007, he was traded to San Jose Earthquakes in exchange for a fourth-round pick in the 2008 MLS SuperDraft. He never appeared in a match for San Jose before being traded with a fourth-round pick in the 2009 MLS SuperDraft to Colorado Rapids in exchange for Jovan Kirovski and Kelly Gray on May 21, 2008.

=== New England Revolution ===
On January 22, 2010, Burpo was part of a four-player trade that sent him and Cory Gibbs to New England Revolution in exchange for Wells Thompson and the rights to Jeff Larentowicz. With regular New England starter Matt Reis recovering from off-season shoulder surgery, Burpo was immediately inserted into the Revolution's lineup; making his Revolution debut in the 2010 New England Revolution season opener on March 27, a 1-0 loss to the LA Galaxy. Burpo recorded his first clean sheet for the Revolution the following week, a 2-0 victory over DC United. He made his home debut the following week on April 10, allowing one goal in a 4-1 win over Toronto FC.

On May 29, 2010, in a game against New York Red Bulls, Burpo's tibia and fibula snapped when he collided with NYRB striker Dane Richards while challenging for the ball at the edge of his penalty area; many observers compared the injury to the one which ended the career of American football star Joe Theismann in 1985, and the similar double-break which ended the career of English Premier League player David Busst in 1996. On June 1 the Revolution placed Burpo on the season-ending injury list and activated Matt Reis from the disabled list. In total, Burpo appeared in 11 matches for the Revolution (all starts) with a 73.8% save percentage.

After the 2010 MLS season New England declined Burpo's contract option and he elected to participate in the 2010 MLS Re-Entry Draft. Burpo became a free agent when he was not selected in the Re-Entry Draft. He did not play a competitive soccer game after his injury.

== Coaching ==
Burpo spent the 2011 season as a scout for the United States Soccer Federation. On October 3, 2011, he was announced as the goalkeeper coach for Major League Soccer expansion side Montreal Impact. He was the goalkeeper coach at D.C. United in the 2013 and 2014 seasons. Under his tutelage, Bill Hamid became the 2014 MLS Goalkeeper of the Year.
