= Pablo Mastroeni =

Soccer coach & player (born 1976)

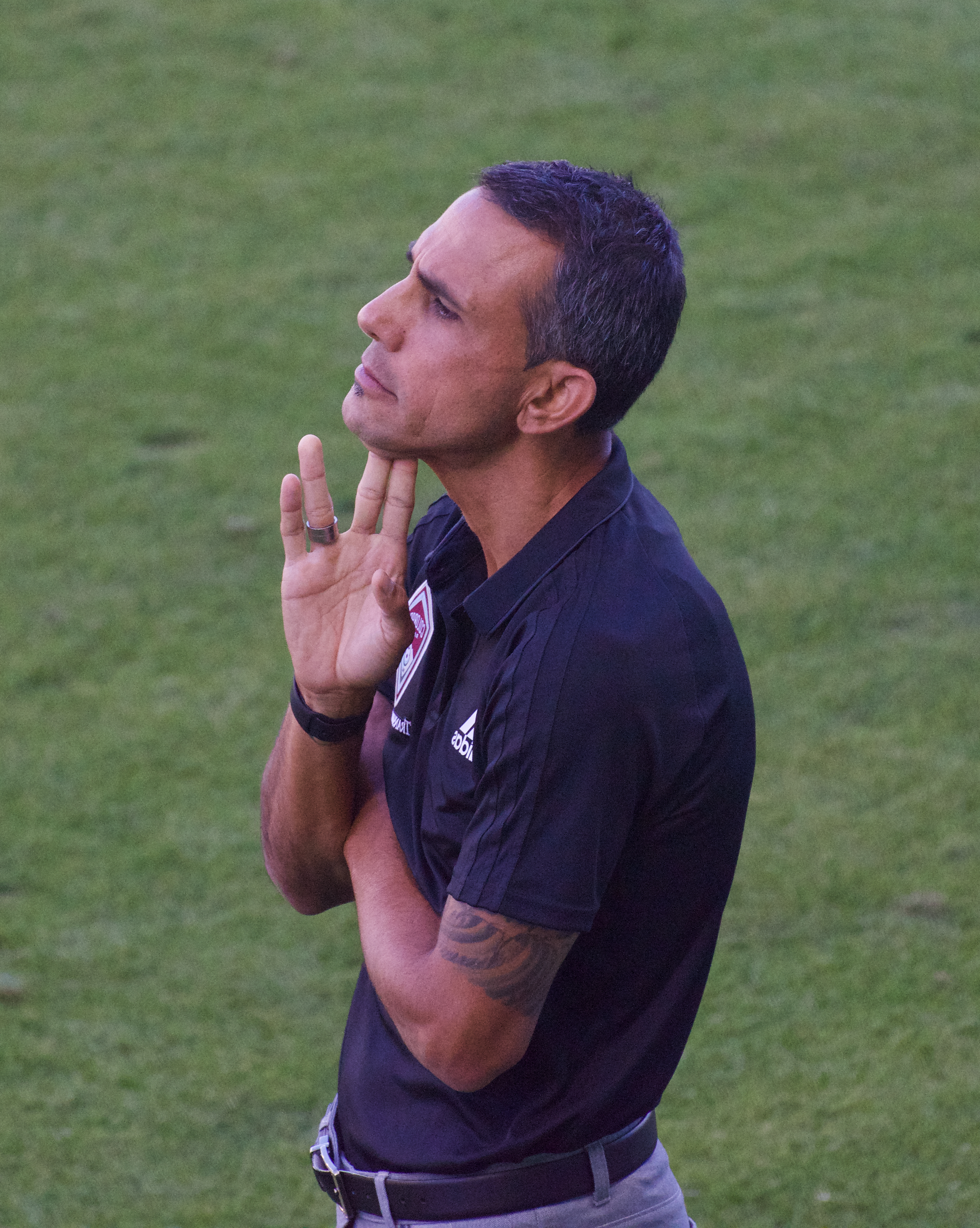
- Mastroeni coaching the Colorado Rapids in 2017

Personal information
- Full name: Pablo Mastroeni
- Date of birth: August 29, 1976 (age 50)
- Place of birth: Mendoza, Argentina
- Height: 5 ft 10 in (1.78 m)
- Position: Defensive midfielder

College career
Years	Team	Apps	(Gls)
1994–1997	North Carolina State		

Senior career*
Years	Team	Apps	(Gls)
1995–1997	Tucson Amigos		
1998–2001	Miami Fusion	100	(2)
1998	→ MLS Pro-40 (loan)	1	(0)
2002–2013	Colorado Rapids	225	(5)
2013	LA Galaxy	9	(0)
Total		334	(7)

International career^{‡}
2001–2009	United States	65	(0)

Managerial career
- 2014–2017: Colorado Rapids
- 2021–: Real Salt Lake
Medal record
Representing United States
Winner	CONCACAF Gold Cup	2002
Winner	CONCACAF Gold Cup	2005
Winner	CONCACAF Gold Cup	2007
Third place	CONCACAF Gold Cup	2003
Men's Football
- * Club domestic league appearances and goals as of December 10, 2013 ‡ National team caps and goals as of March 6, 2011

Pablo Mastroeni (born August 29, 1976) is a professional soccer coach and former player who is currently the head coach of Major League Soccer club Real Salt Lake. Born in Argentina, he played for the United States national team.

He was formerly head coach of the Colorado Rapids, and assistant coach of the Houston Dynamo. In his playing career, he played as a defensive midfielder.

== Early life and education ==
Mastroeni was born in Argentina and moved to the United States with his family at the age of four, settling in Phoenix, Arizona. He attended Thunderbird High School and Mountain Sky Middle School, and played youth soccer for the Santos Futbol Clube. Mastroeni attended North Carolina State University where he played on the men's soccer team from 1994 to 1997. From 1995 to 1997, he spent the collegiate off season playing for the Tucson Amigos of the USISL.

== Playing career ==
=== Professional ===
In February 1998, the Miami Fusion selected Mastroeni in the second round (thirteenth overall) of the 1998 MLS College Draft. He played four seasons with the Fusion, becoming a regular starter in his second year with the team in either central defense or defensive midfield, and was named to the MLS Best XI in 2001.

The Fusion was contracted after the 2001 season and Mastroeni was the first overall choice of the 2002 MLS Allocation Draft, going to the Colorado Rapids, whom he captained to their first title in 2010. Mastroeni scored his first MLS playoff goal against the Columbus Crew on October 28, 2010.

Mastroeni was traded to the Los Angeles Galaxy in June 2013 and retired at the end of the season.

In 2021, Mastroeni's #25 was retired by the Colorado Rapids. This was the first number retired by the Colorado Rapids.

=== International career ===
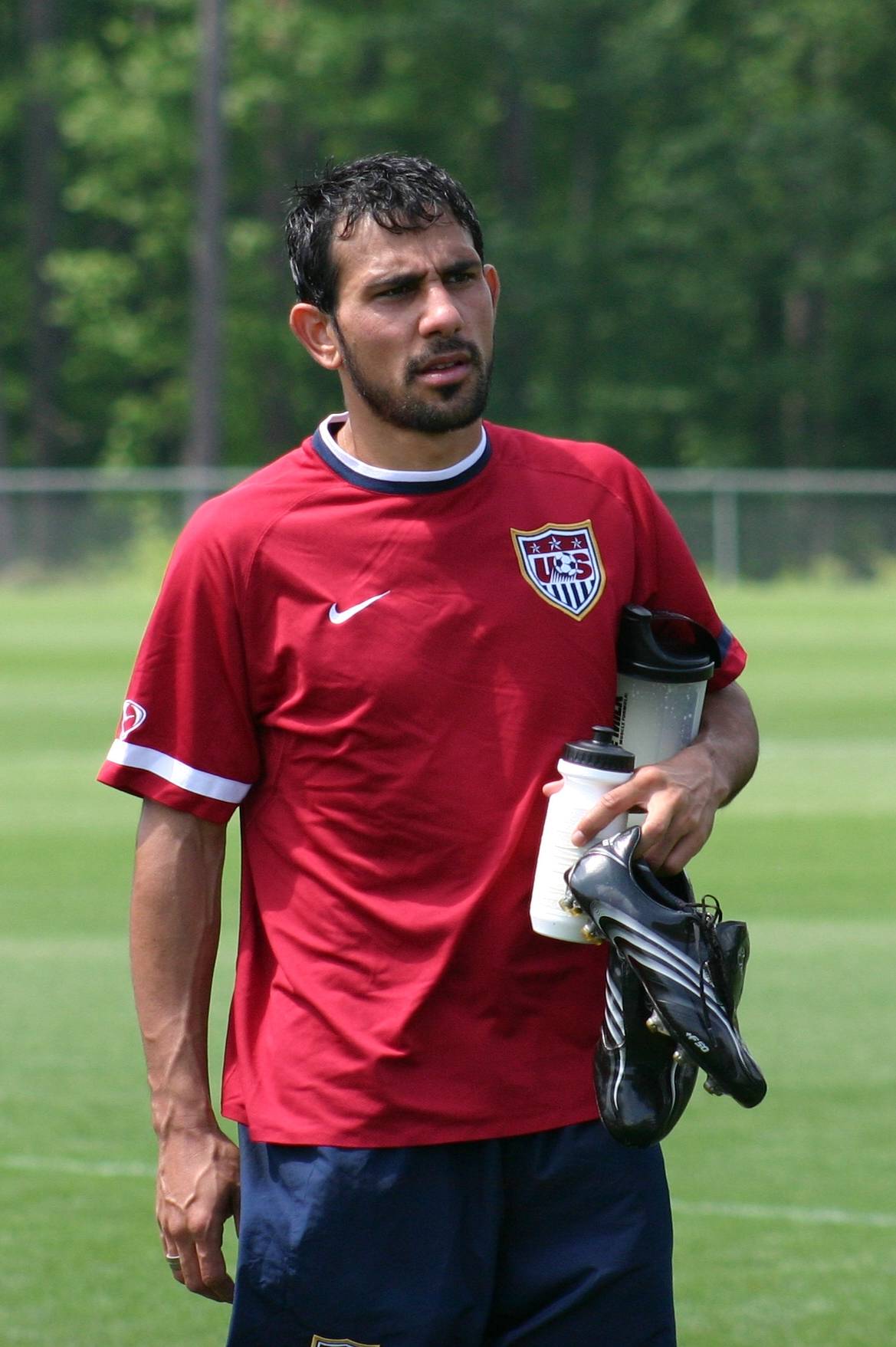
Mastroeni in 2006

Mastroeni earned his first U.S. cap against Ecuador on June 7, 2001. When Chris Armas went out with an injury just weeks prior to the 2002 World Cup, Mastroeni found himself a starter in the opening game as the U.S. defeated Portugal 3–2.

On January 10, 2005, it was reported that he tore the quadriceps in his left leg and would be out for six to eight weeks. The injury happened while training with the national team.

Mastroeni was named to the 2006 U.S. World Cup squad. In a FIFA World Cup 2006 match against Italy on June 17, Mastroeni was given a red card for an aggressive tackle in the first half. Mastroeni was fined CHF 7,500 and received a three-game suspension, thus missing the last U.S. match of the World Cup and the first two matches of the 2007 CONCACAF Gold Cup.

On February 7, 2007, during a friendly between the United States and Mexico, Mastroeni was the team captain.

Mastroeni was called up for the United States' first World Cup qualifying match of 2010 and two third-round matches, and started three of the first five final round matches for the United States. However, he was not named to the Confederations Cup roster nor any of the squads for the final five qualifiers for the United States.

== Coaching ==
=== Colorado Rapids ===
==== 2014 ====
Mastroeni was named the interim head coach of the Colorado Rapids after Oscar Pareja left for FC Dallas in January 2014. He was named head coach of the Rapids on March 8, 2014, one week before the 2014 season began.

In 2014, Mastroeni and the Rapids experienced the worst Rapids season in the 34 game MLS era. Allowing the most goals in the MLS, 62, the Rapids finished second to last in the Western Conference with 32 points.

==== 2015 ====
2015 was another unsuccessful campaign for Mastroeni. The Rapids ended the season last in the Western Conference and second to last in the overall standings, receiving the second overall pick in the upcoming MLS Superdraft.

==== 2016 ====
During the offseason before the 2016 season, Mastroeni visited London, spending several days watching Arsenal and Tottenham train. While there, he analyzed the coaching styles of Tottenham's Mauricio Pochettino and Arsenal's Arsène Wenger, before he traveled to Orlando to attend a supplementary coaching course. Mastroeni helped the Rapids establish a team identity in 2016, a defensive based team which operated out of the 4-2-3-1 formation. This identity helped the Rapids to their best regular season record of all time, with a franchise low 6 losses and a franchise high of 58 points. The team allowed an MLS low 32 goals in 2016. Mastroeni finished second in voting for the annual MLS Coach of the Year award.

==== 2017 ====
In the offseason, Mastroeni signed a three-year contract extension, through 2019. On August 15, Mastroeni was fired as Head Coach and replaced by Steve Cooke.

=== Houston Dynamo ===
In 2020, Mastroeni was named as an assistant coach for the Houston Dynamo.

=== Real Salt Lake ===
In 2021, Mastroeni was named as an assistant coach for Real Salt Lake On August 27, 2021, he was named the interim head coach upon Freddy Juarez's unexpected midseason departure. On December 13, 2021, Mastroeni was named permanent head coach of the club for the 2022 season.

== Career statistics ==
=== Club ===
Appearances and goals by club, season and competition
Club	Season	League			Playoffs		Cup (Note: All appearances in the U.S. Open Cup)		Continental		Total	
Club	Season	Division	Apps	Goals	Apps	Goals	Apps	Goals	Apps	Goals	Apps	Goals
Miami Fusion	1998	Major League Soccer	23	0	2	0	1	0	—		26	0
Miami Fusion	1999	Major League Soccer	23	0	2	0	—		—		25	0
Miami Fusion	2000	Major League Soccer	29	0	—		1	0	—		30	0
Miami Fusion	2001	Major League Soccer	25	2	4	0	—		—		29	0
Miami Fusion	Total		100	2	8	0	2	0	0	0	110	2
Colorado Rapids	2002	Major League Soccer	15	0	5	0	—		—		20	0
Colorado Rapids	2003	Major League Soccer	18	0	2	0	—		—		20	0
Colorado Rapids	2004	Major League Soccer	17	0	2	0	—		—		19	0
Colorado Rapids	2005	Major League Soccer	14	1	3	0	—		—		17	1
Colorado Rapids	2006	Major League Soccer	20	0	3	0	—		—		23	0
Colorado Rapids	2007	Major League Soccer	23	0	—		—		—		23	0
Colorado Rapids	2008	Major League Soccer	25	0	—		—		—		25	0
Colorado Rapids	2009	Major League Soccer	25	1	—		—		—		25	1
Colorado Rapids	2010	Major League Soccer	29	2	4	1	—		—		33	3
Colorado Rapids	2011	Major League Soccer	30	1	—		—		1 (Note: Appearance(s) in the CONCACAF Champions League)	0	31	1
Colorado Rapids	2012	Major League Soccer	2	0	—		—		—		2	0
Colorado Rapids	2013	Major League Soccer	7	0	—		—		—		7	0
Colorado Rapids	Total		225	5	19	1	0	0	1	0	245	6
LA Galaxy	2013	Major League Soccer	9	0	—		—		3	0	12	0
Career total			334	7	27	1	2	0	4	0	367	8

=== International ===
Appearances and goals by national team and year
National team	Year	Apps	Goals
United States	2001	2	0
United States	2002	12	0
United States	2003	11	0
United States	2004	7	0
United States	2005	11	0
United States	2006	7	0
United States	2007	7	0
United States	2008	5	0
United States	2009	3	0
Total		65	0

== Coaching statistics ==
As of match played 19 November 2026

Coaching record by team and tenure
Team	Nat	From	To	Record								Ref
Team	Nat	From	To	G	W	D	L	GF	GA	GD	Win %	Ref
Colorado Rapids	(United States)	January 4, 2014	August 15, 2017	136	43	35	58	155	185	−30	31.62	
Real Salt Lake	(United States)	August 27, 2021	present	217	85	52	80	318	325	−7	39.17	
Total				353	128	87	138	473	510	−37	36.26	

== Honors ==
Miami Fusion

- Supporters' Shield: 2001

Colorado Rapids

- MLS Cup: 2010
- Western Conference (MLS): 2010

United States

- CONCACAF Gold Cup: 2002, 2005, 2007

Individual

- MLS All-Star: 2000
- MLS Best XI: 2001
- CONCACAF Gold Cup All-Tournament team: 2007
