= Pat Phelan (soccer) =

American soccer player

Personal information
- Full name: Patrick Phelan
- Date of birth: January 16, 1985 (age 41)
- Place of birth: Houston, Texas, United States
- Height: 6 ft 1 in (1.85 m)
- Positions: Defensive midfielder; defender

Youth career
- 2004–2007: Wake Forest Demon Deacons

Senior career*
Years	Team	Apps	(Gls)
2008	Toronto FC	0	(0)
2008–2011	New England Revolution	80	(2)
2012	SJK	20	(1)
2013	San Antonio Scorpions	20	(0)
Total		120	(3)

International career^{‡}
- United States U18
- United States U20
- * Club domestic league appearances and goals as of February 4, 2014 ‡ National team caps and goals as of August 7, 2010

Pat Phelan (born January 16, 1985, in Houston, Texas) is an American soccer player.

== Career ==
=== Youth and college ===
Phelan grew up in Enfield, Connecticut, and attended Wilbraham & Monson Academy, where he was named the 2003 Gatorade National High School Player of the Year. He also played club soccer for the Oakwood Soccer Club. He played college soccer for Wake Forest University, where he was a double major in political science and Spanish. He was named to the 2004 ACC All-Freshmen Team, the 2005 Top Drawer Soccer 2nd All-America team, the 2005 NSCAA All-Region Team, and 2007 ACC First Team. He was an NSCAA First Team All American in 2007 and captained the Wake Forest Demon Deacons to their first NCAA Division 1 National Championship.

=== Professional ===
Phelan was drafted in the first round (10th overall) of the 2008 MLS SuperDraft by Toronto FC but did not make a first team start before being traded to New England Revolution on June 4, 2008. In return, Toronto received use of an international roster spot through the end of the 2010 season. He made his MLS debut Revolution, on June 12, 2008, against Houston Dynamo.

On August 7, 2010, Phelan scored his first career goal, against D.C. United, on a header from a long pass from teammate Chris Tierney. The Revolution ended up winning the game, by a score of 1–0, thanks to Phelan's goal.

Signed with SJK of the Ykkönen in May 2012.

After one season in Finland, Phelan returned to the United States when he signed for NASL club San Antonio Scorpions on March 1, 2013.

After one season with the San Antonio Scorpions, despite several international offers, Phelan elected to retire from professional football and pursue a career in Financial Planning. He now resides on Cape Cod with his family and works for New York Life.

=== International ===
Phelan played for the USA Under-18, Under-20, and Under 23 national teams, and was part of the squad for the 2005 FIFA World Youth Championship. He was named the Most Valuable Player of 2002 Talence International Tournament in Talence, France, and competed in the Northern Ireland Milk Cup in 2003 and 2004.

== Personal ==
Phelan married Maggie Reddington on January 10, 2009, in Chatham, Massachusetts. His parents are Tom and Phyllis Phelan, of Enfield, Connecticut. He has a sister named Grace. He is the cousin of Gerard Phelan, the recipient of Doug Flutie's famed Hail Mary Pass versus Miami on November 23, 1984.

== Honors ==
=== Wake Forest University ===
- NCAA Men's Division I Soccer Championship (1): 2007
