= Emmanuel Osei =

Ghanaian former footballer (born 1982)

Personal information
- Date of birth: 23 August 1982 (age 44)
- Place of birth: Accra, Ghana
- Height: 1.80 m (5 ft 11 in)
- Position: Defender

Senior career*
| Years | Team | Apps | (Gls) |
| 2001 | Echomog | 16 | (1) |
| 2002 | Suhum Maxbees | 39 | (7) |
| 2003 | Hearts of Oak | 31 | (2) |
| 2003–2004 | Sebatspor | 17 | (2) |
| 2004–2006 | Livorno | 6 | (0) |
| 2005–2006 | → Politehnica Timişoara (loan) | 13 | (1) |
| 2007 | ASV Cham | | |
| 2008 | Wa All Stars | | |
| 2008–2009 | Liberty Professionals | | |
| 2009–2010 | New England Revolution | 44 | (0) |
| 2013 | Hearts of Oak | | |
| 2013–2015 | Ashanti Gold | | |

International career
| 2004 | Ghana U23 | 3 | (0) |
| 2005 | Ghana | 1 | (0) |
- * Club domestic league appearances and goals as of 3 December 2013

Emmanuel Osei (born 23 August 1982, in Accra) is a Ghanaian former footballer who played as a defender.

== Club career ==
Born in Accra, Osei began his career in 2001 with regional club Echomog, and moved to Suhum Maxbees of the Poly Tank Division One League a year later. He played for his third team in as many years in 2003 after transferring to Accra Hearts of Oak SC, before moving to Turkey to play for Akçaabat Sebatspor (then in the top flight), also in that year.

For the 2004–05 season Osei joined A.S. Livorno Calcio of Serie A, going much unnoticed for the majority of the campaign. In two appearances in May, he played in consecutive defeats – where the team conceded 12 goals – against Parma F.C. and A.C. Siena.

The following year Osei was loaned to FC Politehnica Timișoara, with the Romanian club having an option to buy him at the end of the season. He was eventually released by Livorno and, after a brief spell in Germany with amateurs ASV Cham, returned to his country to play in the top level, representing in quick succession Wa All Stars and Liberty Professionals.

On 31 March 2009 Osei signed with Major League Soccer's New England Revolution, being waived in January 2011. On 14 November 2012, he returned to his country and Hearts of Oak.

== International career ==
Osei was part of the Ghanaian 2004 Olympic football team which exited in the first round, having finished third in group B. In the following year, he gained his first and only senior cap.
