= Abdoulie Mansally =

Gambian footballer (born 1989)

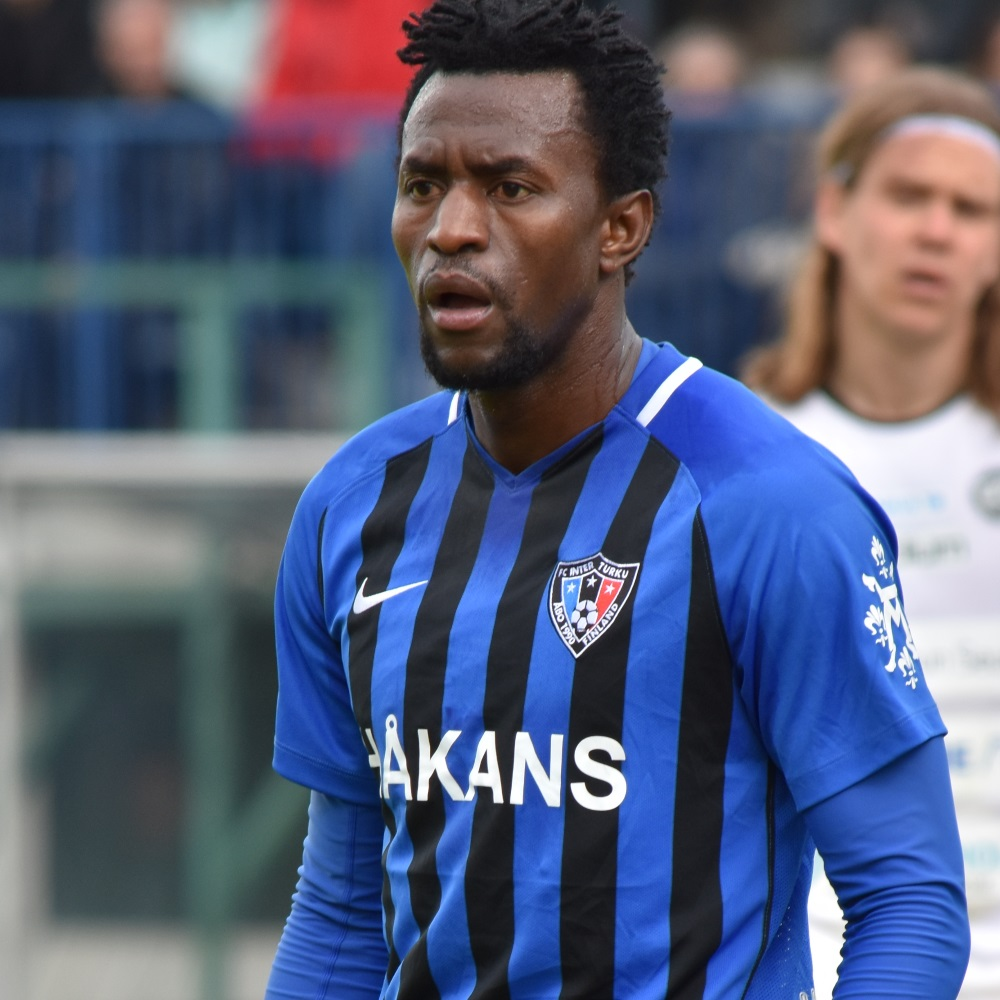
- Mansally with Turku in 2018

Personal information
- Full name: Abdoulie Kenny Mansally
- Date of birth: 27 January 1989 (age 37)
- Place of birth: Banjul, the Gambia
- Height: 5 ft 9 in (1.75 m)
- Positions: Wing back; winger; forward

Youth career
- 2005–2006: Real de Banjul

Senior career*
| Years | Team | Apps | (Gls) |
| 2006–2007 | Real de Banjul | | |
| 2007–2012 | New England Revolution | 89 | (7) |
| 2012–2015 | Real Salt Lake | 49 | (1) |
| 2016 | Houston Dynamo | 9 | (0) |
| 2016 | → RGVFC Toros (loan) | 1 | (0) |
| 2017 | PS Kemi | 29 | (6) |
| 2018 | Inter Turku | 20 | (2) |
| 2019 | Charlotte Independence | 29 | (2) |

International career
| 2005 | Gambia U17 | 3 | (1) |
| 2007 | Gambia U20 | 4 | (1) |
| 2008–2015 | Gambia | 16 | (0) |
- * Club domestic league appearances and goals as of 16:01, 21 October 2019 (UTC)

Abdoulie Kenny Mansally (born 27 January 1989) is a Gambian professional footballer. He is featured on the Gambian national team in the official 2010 FIFA World Cup video game.

== Professional career ==
=== New England Revolution ===
Mansally began his career in The Gambia, graduating from the youth academy of Real de Banjul, and playing in the GFA League First Division.

He was scouted by New England Revolution head coach Steve Nicol while playing in the 2007 FIFA U-20 World Cup, and signed with the Revolution shortly thereafter along with his Gambian teammate, Sainey Nyassi. He made his first start for the Revolution on 29 March 2008, and scored his first MLS goal on 9 April 2008 in a game against the Kansas City Wizards.

On 3 April 2010, he had his first career multi-goal game, a brace (including his first league goal in over a year) with a pair of goals 110 seconds apart to spark New England to a 2–0 victory.

Mansally was waived by New England on 4 May 2012.

=== Real Salt Lake ===
After trials with both D.C. United and Real Salt Lake, Mansally officially signed with Salt Lake on 20 June 2012. He made his debut for the club on 4 July 2012 in a 0-0 tie against Seattle Sounders FC.

=== Houston Dynamo ===
Mansally was traded to Houston Dynamo ahead of the 2016 season in exchange for a third-round pick in the 2017 MLS SuperDraft.

=== FC Inter Turku ===
After signing for FC Inter Turku in February 2018, he left the club again at the end of the year.

== International career ==
Mansally received his first call-up for the Gambia National Football Team during qualifying for the 2010 World Cup, and was an unused substitute in the home and away matches against Liberia. He earned his first cap for his country coming off the bench in a qualifier against Algeria.

== Personal ==
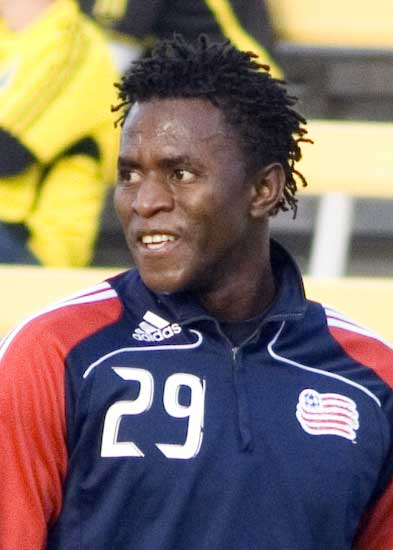
Abdoulie Mansally in 2009.

Mansally went by the nickname "Kenny" for years, including for his first six seasons as a professional in MLS before dropping the nickname at the outset of the 2013 season in order to remind people of who he is and where he came from.

Mansally received his U.S. green card in 2010 which qualifies him as a domestic player for MLS roster purposes.

Mansally received his US citizenship in 2015.

== Charity Work ==
Mansally started the Mansally Foundation based on improving the lives and the conditions of the community where he grew up. The country of Gambia is a small country in Africa where most families farm for a living. The foundation is in place to provide children from Gambia access to food, medical care, and an education to a brighter future.

https://web.archive.org/web/20150222050125/http://www.mansallyfoundation.org/

== Honors ==
=== New England Revolution ===
- Lamar Hunt U.S. Open Cup (1): 2007
- North American SuperLiga (1): 2008

=== Real Salt Lake ===
- Major League Soccer Western Conference Championship (1): 2013

=== Individual ===
- MLS Player Of The Week: Week 2, 2010
