= Zack Schilawski =

American former soccer player (born 1987)

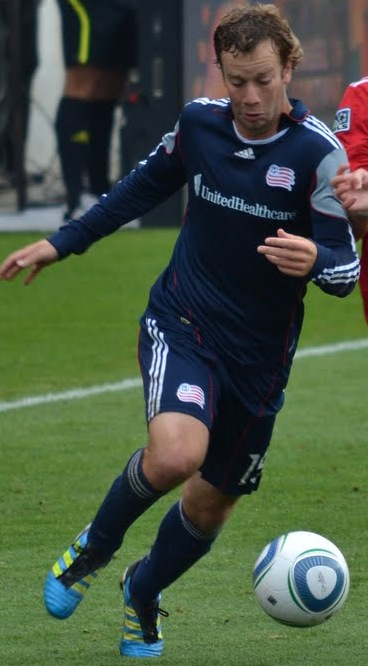

Personal information
- Full name: Zack Schilawski
- Date of birth: April 15, 1987 (age 39)
- Place of birth: Raleigh, North Carolina, United States
- Height: 5 ft 10 in (1.78 m)
- Position: Forward

College career
Years	Team	Apps	(Gls)
2006–2009	Wake Forest Demon Deacons	99	(40)

Senior career*
Years	Team	Apps	(Gls)
2007–2009	Cary Clarets	32	(13)
2010–2011	New England Revolution	50	(6)
2012–2014	Carolina RailHawks	53	(15)
Total		135	(34)

Managerial career
- 2015–2018: North Carolina FC U23 (assistant)
- 2020–2021: Denver Pioneers (assistant)
- 2021–2022: UNC Wilmington Seahawks (assistant)
- 2023–: Pittsburgh Panthers (assistant)
- * Club domestic league appearances and goals as of September 15, 2014

Zack Schilawski (born April 15, 1987, in Raleigh, North Carolina) is an American former soccer player who last played for Carolina RailHawks in the North American Soccer League. He is currently an assistant coach for the Pittsburgh Panthers.

== Career ==
=== High school ===
He played all 4 years for Cary High School in Cary, North Carolina, earning All Conference team honors all 4 years, and All State honors for 3 years, in addition to graduating 4th in his academic class in 2006.

=== College and amateur ===
Schilawski played college soccer at Wake Forest University from 2006 to 2009 where he appeared in 99 games, scoring 40 goals and adding 20 assists. He was a member of Wake Forest's 2007 NCAA College Cup Championship team and scored the game-winning goal against Ohio State in the final of the 2007 College Cup at SAS Soccer Park in his hometown, Cary, NC. In 2009, he was also named to the All-ACC 1st Team and the College Soccer News All-American 2nd Team.

During his college years, Schilawski also played for both Cary Clarets and their predecessor Cary RailHawks U23's in the USL Premier Development League.

=== Professional ===
Schilawski was drafted in the first round (9th overall) of the 2010 MLS SuperDraft by New England Revolution.

He made his MLS debut with a start in the season opener against Los Angeles Galaxy on March 27. In his home debut against Toronto FC on April 10, he netted a hat trick, becoming the first rookie in MLS history to register a hat trick in his home debut and just the third rookie in MLS history to net a hat trick. He scored the Revs’ lone goal in a 1–1 tie with FC Dallas on May 1 and scored the game-winner in a 3–2 win over New York to help snap a seven-game winless streak on May 29. He appeared in all five SuperLiga matches, making two starts, and scored the game-winning goal in the 1–0 win over Pumas UNAM on July 14. He came on as a 70th-minute substitute in the final against Morelia on September 1 and recorded his first professional assist on Kevin Alston's 79th-minute goal.

Schilawski was waived by New England on March 5, 2012. Following his release, Schilawski trialled with Chicago Fire, but wasn't signed by the club.

Schilawski signed with NASL club Carolina RailHawks on April 27, 2012. On November 1, 2014, he officially retired from professional soccer, and graduated from law school at the University of North Carolina at Chapel Hill. He currently works as an attorney at Wake Family Law Group in the family law section.

Schilawski joined the staff of Jay Vidovich with the Pittsburgh Panthers men's soccer team ahead of the 2023 season. Schilawski had played under Vidovich while at Wake Forest.
