= 2011 MLS expansion draft =

Player draft for MLS teams

2011 MLS Expansion Draft

General information
- Date(s): November 23, 2011

Overview
- Expansion team: Montreal Impact
- Expansion season: 2012

The 2011 MLS Expansion Draft was held on November 23, 2011 as a special draft for the Major League Soccer expansion team Montreal Impact.

== Format ==
- Existing teams were allowed to protect 11 players from their rosters. Generation Adidas players were automatically protected, though players who graduated from the program to the senior roster at the end of the 2011 season were not.
- Homegrown players on the team's off-budget roster were automatically protected and did not count against each team's 11 protected roster spots.
- Designated players only had to be protected if they had a no-trade clause.
- Existing clubs had to submit their protected rosters to MLS by November 21, 2011. The protected rosters were made public later that day.

== Expansion draft results ==
Pick	Player	Previous Team
1	Brian Ching	Houston Dynamo
2	Zarek Valentin	Chivas USA
3	Justin Mapp	Philadelphia Union
4	Bobby Burling	San Jose Earthquakes
5	Jeb Brovsky	Vancouver Whitecaps FC
6	Collen Warner	Real Salt Lake
7	Josh Gardner	Columbus Crew
8	Sanna Nyassi	Colorado Rapids
9	James Riley*	Seattle Sounders FC
10	Seth Sinovic	Sporting Kansas City

- Riley was immediately traded to Chivas USA with allocation money for Justin Braun and Gerson Mayen.

== Team-by-team-breakdown ==
=== Chicago Fire ===
Exposed	Protected	Exempt
Mike Banner	Jalil Anibaba	Corben Bone
Diego Cháves	Orr Barouch	Kellen Gulley
Jon Conway	Cory Gibbs	Victor Pineda
Yamith Cuesta	Sebastián Grazzini	
Alec Dufty	Sean Johnson	
Gabriel Ferrari	Patrick Nyarko	
Dan Gargan	Dominic Oduro	
Baggio Husidić	Pável Pardo	
Steven Kinney	Logan Pause	
Josip Mikulić	Marco Pappa	
Cristian Nazarit	Gonzalo Segares	
Daniel Paladini		
Pari Pantazopoulos		
Michael Videira		
Kwame Watson-Siriboe		

=== Chivas USA ===
Exposed	Protected	Exempt
Sergio Arias	Juan Pablo Ángel	Tristan Bowen
Andrew Boyens	Justin Braun	Bryan de la Fuente
Chukwudi Chijindu	Jorge Flores	
Chris Cortez	Dan Kennedy	
Laurent Courtois	Nick LaBrocca	
Simon Elliott	Alejandro Moreno	
Víctor Estupiñán	Paulo Nagamura	
Blair Gavin	Heath Pearce	
Ante Jazić	Ryan Smith	
David Lopes	Michael Umaña	
Michael Lahoud	Ben Zemanski	
Gerson Mayen		
Marcos Mondaini		
Zach Thornton		
Mariano Trujillo		
Zarek Valentin		

=== Colorado Rapids ===
Exposed	Protected	Exempt
Eddie Ababio	Conor Casey	Davy Armstrong
Andre Akpan	Omar Cummings	Josh Janniere
Quincy Amarikwa	Danny Earls	
Steward Ceus	Jeff Larentowicz	
Miguel Comminges	Pablo Mastroeni	
Steven Emory	Drew Moor	
Caleb Folan	Brian Mullan	
Michael Holody	Joseph Nane	
Ian Joyce	Matt Pickens	
Macoumba Kandji	Jamie Smith	
Kosuke Kimura	Marvell Wynne	
Ross LaBauex		
Tyrone Marshall		
Sanna Nyassi		
Scott Palguta		
Wells Thompson		
Anthony Wallace		

=== Columbus Crew ===
Exposed	Protected	Exempt
Kevin Burns	Bernardo Añor	Aaron Horton
Jeff Cunningham	Rich Balchan	
Emmanuel Ekpo	Dilly Duka	
Shaun Francis	Eddie Gaven	
Josh Gardner	William Hesmer	
Eric Gehrig	Julius James	
Cole Grossman	Chad Marshall	
Andy Gruenebaum	Sebastián Miranda	
Tom Heinemann	Emilio Rentería	
Justin Meram	Robbie Rogers	
Andrés Mendoza	Tony Tchani	
Danny O'Rourke		
John Owoeri		
Santiago Prim		
Alex Riggs		
Dejan Rusmir		
Ben Sippola		
Korey Veeder		
Josh Williams		

=== D.C. United ===
Exposed	Protected	Exempt
Brandon Barklage	Charlie Davies	Bill Hamid
Branko Bošković	Dwayne De Rosario	Andy Najar
Blake Brettschneider	Dejan Jakovic	Conor Shanosky
Marc Burch	Perry Kitchen	Ethan White
Steve Cronin	Chris Korb	
Austin da Luz	Brandon McDonald	
Stephen King	Chris Pontius	
Devon McTavish	Clyde Simms	
Kurt Morsink	Joe Willis	
Joseph Ngwenya	Josh Wolff	
Santino Quaranta	Daniel Woolard	
Jed Zayner		

=== FC Dallas ===
Exposed	Protected	Exempt
Daniel Cruz	Jair Benítez	Moises Hernandez
Edson Edward	Fabián Castillo	Bryan Leyva
Bruno Guarda	Marvin Chávez	Rubén Luna
Maykel Galindo	David Ferreira	Richard Sánchez
Jeremy Hall	Kevin Hartman	Jonathan Top
Daniel Hernández	Ugo Ihemelu	Victor Ulloa
Josh Lambo	Jackson	Andrew Wiedeman
Maicon Santos	Andrew Jacobson	
Chris Seitz	George John	
Jack Stewart	Zach Loyd	
Ricardo Villar	Brek Shea	
Bobby Warshaw		

=== Houston Dynamo ===
Exposed	Protected	Exempt
Brian Ching	Corey Ashe	Will Bruin
Carlo Costly	Bobby Boswell	Tyler Deric
Danny Cruz	Luiz Camargo	Alex Dixon
Hunter Freeman	Geoff Cameron	Francisco Navas
Jason Garey	Calen Carr	Kofi Sarkodie
Evan Newton	Colin Clark	Josue Soto
Eddie Robinson	Brad Davis	
Je-Vaughn Watson	André Hainault	
Cam Weaver	Tally Hall	
	Adam Moffat	
	Jermaine Taylor	

=== Los Angeles Galaxy ===
Exposed	Protected	Exempt
Sean Alvarado	David Beckham	Jack McBean
Chad Barrett	A. J. DeLaGarza	
Chris Birchall	Landon Donovan	
Paolo Cardozo	Todd Dunivant	
Adam Cristman	Sean Franklin	
Frankie Hejduk	Omar Gonzalez	
Héctor Jiménez	Juninho	
Bryan Jordan	Robbie Keane	
Dan Keat	Mike Magee	
Leonardo	Donovan Ricketts	
Miguel López	Josh Saunders	
Dustin McCarty		
Brian Perk		
Dasan Robinson		
Michael Stephens		
Ryan Thomas		

=== New England Revolution ===
Exposed	Protected	Exempt
Darrius Barnes	Kevin Alston	Diego Fagúndez
Zak Boggs	Benny Feilhaber	
Milton Caraglio	Shalrie Joseph	
Ryan Cochrane	Rajko Lekić	
Franco Coria	Stephen McCarthy	
Kheli Dube	Sainey Nyassi	
Ryan Guy	Matt Reis	
Ryan Kinne	Bobby Shuttleworth	
Alan Koger	A. J. Soares	
Otto Loewy	Chris Tierney	
Abdoulie Mansally	Monsef Zerka	
Tim Murray		
Pat Phelan		
Andrew Sousa		
Zack Schilawski		

=== New York Red Bulls ===
Exposed	Protected	Exempt
Chris Albright	Thierry Henry	Juan Agudelo
Stéphane Auvray	Stephen Keel	Corey Hertzog
Mehdi Ballouchy	Joel Lindpere	Šaćir Hot
Bouna Coundoul	Rafael Márquez	Matt Kassel
Alex Horwath	Dax McCarty	
Mike Jones	Roy Miller	
Tyler Lassiter	Tim Ream	
Carlos Mendes	Dane Richards	
Brian Nielsen	Luke Rodgers	
Marcos Paullo	Jan Gunnar Solli	
Carl Robinson	Teemu Tainio	
John Rooney		
Frank Rost		
Teddy Schneider		
Greg Sutton		

=== Philadelphia Union ===
Exposed	Protected	Exempt
Freddy Adu	Danny Califf	Jack McInerney
Juan Diego González	Brian Carroll	Amobi Okugo
Chase Harrison	Keon Daniel	Zach Pfeffer
Thorne Holder	Gabriel Farfan	Zac MacMath
Levi Houapeu	Michael Farfan	
Morgan Langley	Sébastien Le Toux	
Justin Mapp	Danny Mwanga	
Stefani Miglioranzi	Faryd Mondragón	
Kyle Nakazawa	Roger Torres	
Veljko Paunović	Carlos Valdés	
Ryan Richter	Sheanon Williams	
Joe Tait		

=== Portland Timbers ===
Exposed	Protected	Exempt
Eric Alexander	Kalif Alhassan	Darlington Nagbe
Freddie Braun	Eric Brunner	
Adin Brown	Diego Chará	
Mike Chabala	Kenny Cooper	
Bright Dike	Mamadou Danso	
Jake Gleeson	David Horst	
Kevin Goldthwaite	Jack Jewsbury	
Eddie Johnson	Lovel Palmer	
Rodrigo López	Troy Perkins	
Peter Lowry	Jorge Perlaza	
James Marcelin	Rodney Wallace	
Ryan Pore		
Steve Purdy		
Spencer Thompson		
Chris Taylor		
Brian Umony		
Sal Zizzo		

=== Real Salt Lake ===
Exposed	Protected	Exempt
Chris Agorsor	Kyle Beckerman	Luis Gil
Jean Alexandre	Tony Beltran	Nico Muñiz
Arturo Alvarez	Nat Borchers	Donny Toia
Yordany Álvarez	Fabián Espíndola	
Cody Arnoux	Will Johnson	
Nelson González	Javier Morales	
Ned Grabavoy	Jámison Olave	
Rauwshan McKenzie	Nick Rimando	
Tim Melia	Álvaro Saborío	
Paulo Jr.	Chris Schuler	
Kyle Reynish	Chris Wingert	
Robbie Russell		
Collen Warner		
Andy Williams		
Blake Wagner		

=== San Jose Earthquakes ===
Exposed	Protected	Exempt
Anthony Ampaipitakwong	Rafael Baca	David Bingham
Nana Attakora	Steven Beitashour	Ike Opara
Bobby Burling	Jon Busch	
Bobby Convey	Sam Cronin	
Ramiro Corrales	Simon Dawkins	
Joey Gjertsen	Alan Gordon	
Maxwell Griffin	Jason Hernandez	
Chris Leitch	Steven Lenhart	
André Luiz	Justin Morrow	
Matt Luzunaris	Khari Stephenson	
Ellis McLoughlin	Chris Wondolowski	
Jacob Peterson		
Brad Ring		
Scott Sealy		
Tim Ward		
Andrew Weber		

=== Seattle Sounders FC ===
Exposed	Protected	Exempt
Terry Boss	Osvaldo Alonso	Michael Tetteh
Servando Carrasco	Brad Evans	
David Estrada	Álvaro Fernández	
Josh Ford	Erik Friberg	
Mike Fucito	Jhon Kennedy Hurtado	
Leonardo González	Fredy Montero	
Taylor Graham	Lamar Neagle	
Patrick Ianni	Sammy Ochoa	
Nate Jaqua	Jeff Parke	
Roger Levesque	Mauro Rosales	
Bryan Meredith	Steve Zakuani	
Miguel Montaño		
Pat Noonan		
James Riley		
Amadou Sanyang		
Zach Scott		
Mike Seamon		
Tyson Wahl		
O'Brian White		

=== Sporting Kansas City ===
Exposed	Protected	Exempt
Korede Aiyegbusi	Davy Arnaud	Kevin Ellis
Omar Bravo	Matt Besler	Jon Kempin
Daneil Cyrus	Teal Bunbury	
Birahim Diop	Aurélien Collin	
Michael Harrington	Roger Espinoza	
Jéferson	Kei Kamara	
Peterson Joseph	Chance Myers	
Eric Kronberg	Jimmy Nielsen	
Scott Lorenz	Júlio César	
Lawrence Olum	C. J. Sapong	
Craig Rocastle	Graham Zusi	
Soony Saad		
Luke Sassano		
Seth Sinovic		
Miloš Stojčev		
Shavar Thomas		
Konrad Warzycha		

=== Toronto FC ===
Exposed	Protected	Exempt
Elbekay Bouchiba	Eric Avila	Oscar Cordon
Danleigh Borman	Terry Dunfield	Doneil Henry
Adrian Cann	Richard Eckersley	Nicholas Lindsay
Kyle Davies	Stefan Frei	Keith Makubuya
Julian de Guzman	Torsten Frings	Ashtone Morgan
Matt Gold	Ty Harden	Matt Stinson
Léandre Griffit	Andy Iro	
Peri Marošević	Ryan Johnson	
Javier Martina	Miloš Kocić	
Demitrius Omphroy	Danny Koevermans	
Nick Soolsma	Joao Plata	
Nathan Sturgis		
Eddy Viator		
Dicoy Williams		
Mikael Yourassowsky		
Gianluca Zavarise		

=== Vancouver Whitecaps FC ===
Exposed	Protected	Exempt
Michael Boxall	Davide Chiumiento	Bryce Alderson
Jeb Brovsky	Jay DeMerit	Philippe Davies
Joe Cannon	Atiba Harris	Nizar Khalfan
Bilal Duckett	Jordan Harvey	Michael Nanchoff
Greg Janicki	Eric Hassli	Omar Salgado
Mustapha Jarju	Gershon Koffie	Brian Sylvestre
Jonathan Leathers	Carlyle Mitchell	Russell Teibert
Alexandre Morfaw	Alain Rochat	
Jay Nolly	Shea Salinas	
John Thorrington	Camilo Sanvezzo	
Peter Vagenas	Long Tan	
