= 2011 New England Revolution season =

New England Revolution
2011 season
- Owner: Robert Kraft
- Coach: Steve Nicol
- Major League Soccer: Conference: 9th Overall: 18th
- MLS Cup: Did not qualify
- U.S. Open Cup: Qualification finals
- World Football Challenge: 8th
- Top goalscorer: League: Shalrie Joseph (5); All: Shalrie Joseph (5)
- Highest home attendance: 51,523 v Manchester United (July 13, 2011)
- Lowest home attendance: 7,114 v Portland (April 2, 2011)
- Average home league attendance: 13,222
Home colors	Away colors

The 2011 New England Revolution season was the sixteenth season of the team's existence, all in Major League Soccer. The regular season began on March 20, 2011 at Los Angeles Galaxy and concluded on October 22, 2011 at Toronto FC. New England's first league home game was March 26 against D.C. United.

== Overview ==
=== Preseason ===
==== February ====
The New England Revolution started training camp in Foxboro at Gillette Stadium on Monday January 31, 2011. After two weeks of training in New England, the Revolution move camp down to Florida to begin playing games and getting ready for the 2011 MLS Season.

=== March ===
The New England Revolution opened up the 2011 MLS Season on the road with a 1–1 tie against the Los Angeles Galaxy at the Home Depot Center in Carson, California on March 20. The game was played in a heavy rainstorm with difficult field conditions. Shalrie Joseph scored the first goal of the year for the club in the 3rd minute of the game to give them the early 1-0 lead, but the score was later leveled on a Juninho strike from long distance. The Revolution made their 2011 home opener at Gillette Stadium on March 26 against the D.C. United. Two early goals in that game by Zack Schilawski and Joseph gave the Revolution a 2–0 lead which they held on to until stoppage time in the second half where Charlie Davies scored on a penalty. The Revolution held on to win the game 2-1, improving their win streak in home openers to 5 games.

== Squad ==
=== Roster ===
Note: Flags indicate national team as defined under FIFA eligibility rules; some limited exceptions apply. Players may hold more than one non-FIFA nationality.

No.	Pos.	Nation	Player
1	GK	USA	Matt Reis
2	DF	ARG	Franco Coria
4	DF	LBR	Otto Loewy
5	DF	USA	A. J. Soares
7	MF	GAM	Kenny Mansally
8	MF	USA	Chris Tierney
9	FW	ARG	Milton Caraglio
10	FW	DEN	Rajko Lekić
11	FW	ZIM	Kheli Dube
12	FW	USA	Alan Koger
13	MF	GUM	Ryan Guy
14	MF	URU	Diego Fagúndez
15	FW	USA	Zack Schilawski
17	MF	GAM	Sainey Nyassi

No.	Pos.	Nation	Player
19	FW	MAR	Monsef Zerka
21	MF	GRN	Shalrie Joseph (captain)
22	MF	USA	Benny Feilhaber
23	MF	USA	Andrew Sousa
25	DF	USA	Darrius Barnes
26	MF	USA	Stephen McCarthy
28	MF	USA	Pat Phelan
30	DF	USA	Kevin Alston
33	FW	USA	Zak Boggs
34	GK	USA	Bobby Shuttleworth
35	FW	USA	Ryan Kinne
40	GK	USA	Tim Murray
45	DF	USA	Ryan Cochrane

Last updated: August 20, 2011.
Source: New England Revolution

=== Squad information ===
No.	Nat.	Player	Birthday	At NE since	Previous club	MLS appearances	MLS goals
Goalkeepers
1	(United States)	Matt Reis	March 28, 1975 (age 51)	2003	(United States) Los Angeles Galaxy	228	0
34	(United States)	Bobby Shuttleworth	May 13, 1987 (age 39)	2009	(United States) Buffalo City	3	0
40	(United States)	Tim Murray	July 30, 1987 (age 39)	2010	(United States) Providence Friars	0	0
Defenders
2	(Argentina)	Franco Coria	July 8, 1988 (age 38)	2011	(Argentina) Chacarita Juniors	2	0
4	(Liberia)	Otto Loewy	June 4, 1987 (age 39)	2011	Unattached	0	0
5	(United States)	A. J. Soares	November 28, 1988 (age 37)	2011	(United States) California Bears	2	0
25	(United States)	Darrius Barnes	December 24, 1986 (age 39)	2009	(United States) Cary RailHawks	48	0
30	(United States)	Kevin Alston	May 5, 1988 (age 38)	2009	(United States) Indiana Hoosiers	49	0
45	(United States)	Ryan Cochrane	August 8, 1983 (age 43)	2011	(United States) Houston Dynamo	124	4
Midfielders
7	(The Gambia)	Kenny Mansally	January 27, 1989 (age 37)	2007	(The Gambia) Real de Banjul	62	7
8	(United States)	Chris Tierney	January 9, 1986 (age 40)	2008	(United States) Virginia Cavaliers	44	1
13	(Guam)	Ryan Guy	September 5, 1985 (age 40)	2008	(United States) San Diego Flash		
14	(United States)	Diego Fagundez	February 14, 1995 (age 31)	2010	(United States) New England Revolution Academy	1	1
17	(The Gambia)	Sainey Nyassi	January 31, 1989 (age 37)	2007	(The Gambia) Gambia Ports Authority	83	7
21	(Grenada)	Shalrie Joseph	May 24, 1978 (age 48)	2003	(United States) New York Freedom	212	30
22	(United States)	Benny Feilhaber	January 19, 1985 (age 41)	2011	(Denmark) AGF Aarhus	0	0
23	(United States)	Andrew Sousa	September 26, 1989 (age 36)	2011	(United States) Providence Friars	0	0
26	(United States)	Stephen McCarthy	July 21, 1988 (age 38)	2011	(United States) North Carolina Tar Heels	2	0
28	(United States)	Pat Phelan	January 15, 1985 (age 41)	2008	(Canada) Toronto FC	59	2
Forwards
9	(Argentina)	Milton Caraglio	December 1, 1988 (age 37)	2011	(Argentina) Rosario Central	0	0
10	(Denmark)	Rajko Lekić	July 3, 1981 (age 45)	2011	(Denmark) Silkeborg IF	0	0
11	(Zimbabwe)	Kheli Dube	August 6, 1983 (age 43)	2008	(United States) Michigan Bucks	67	14
12	(United States)	Alan Koger	September 25, 1987 (age 38)	2011	(United States) William & Mary Tribe	0	0
15	(United States)	Zack Schilawski	April 15, 1987 (age 39)	2010	(United States) Wake Forest Demon Deacons	27	6
19	(Morocco)	Monsef Zerka	August 30, 1981 (age 44)	2011	(Greece) Iraklis	0	0
33	(United States)	Zak Boggs	December 25, 1986 (age 39)	2010	(United States) South Florida Bulls	11	2
35	(United States)	Ryan Kinne	August 31, 1988 (age 37)	2011	(United States) Monmouth Hawks	1	0

Last updated: April 20, 2011.
Source: New England Revolution

== Player movement ==
=== Transfers ===
==== In ====
Date	Player	Position	Previous club	Fee/notes	Ref
November 15, 2010	(United States) Diego Fagundez	MF	(United States) New England Revolution Academy	Youth Development	
December 15, 2010	(United States) Ryan Cochrane	DF	(United States) Houston Dynamo	2010 MLS Re-Entry Draft	
December 15, 2010	(Brazil) Fred	MF	(United States) Philadelphia Union	2010 MLS Re-Entry Draft, later traded	
January 11, 2011	(France) Didier Domi	DF	(Greece) Olympiacos	Undisclosed	
January 13, 2011	(United States) A.J. Soares	DF	(United States) University of California	SuperDraft, 1st round	
January 13, 2011	(United States) Stephen McCarthy	MF	(United States) University of North Carolina	SuperDraft, 2nd round	
February 11, 2011	(France) Ousmane Dabo	MF	(Italy) Lazio	Undisclosed	
February 17, 2011	(Argentina) Franco Coria	DF	(Argentina) Chacarita	Undisclosed	
March 3, 2011	(United States) Ryan Kinne	MF	(United States) Monmouth University	SuperDraft, 3rd round	
March 3, 2011	(United States) Alan Koger	FW	(United States) College of William & Mary	SuperDraft, 3rd round	
March 3, 2011	(United States) Andrew Sousa	MF	(United States) Providence College	Supplemental Draft, 3rd round	
March 4, 2011	(Nigeria) Michael Augustine	MF	(Nigeria) Abuja	Undisclosed	
March 31, 2011	(Liberia) Otto Loewy	DF	Unattached	Free	
April 8, 2011	(Denmark) Rajko Lekić	FW	(Denmark) Silkeborg	Undisclosed	
April 20, 2011	(United States) Benny Feilhaber	MF	(Denmark) AGF Aarhus	Acquired through Allocation Process	
June 9, 2011	(Guam) Ryan Guy	MF	(United States) San Diego Flash	Free	
August 10, 2011	(Argentina) Milton Caraglio	FW	(Argentina) Rosario Central	Undisclosed; signed as Designated Player	
August 18, 2011	(Morocco) Monsef Zerka	MF	(Greece) Iraklis	Undisclosed	

==== Out ====
Date	Player	Position	Destination club	Fee/notes	Ref
November 3, 2010	(United States) Taylor Twellman	FW	None	Retired	
December 3, 2010	(United States) Preston Burpo	GK	None	Option declined, retired	
December 3, 2010	(Bermuda) Khano Smith	MF	(United States) Carolina RailHawks	Option declined, free transfer	
December 3, 2010	(United States) Nico Colaluca	MF	(Sweden) Norrby IF	Option declined, free transfer	
December 15, 2010	(United States) Cory Gibbs	DF	(United States) Chicago Fire	2010 MLS Re-Entry Draft	
January 18, 2011	(Ghana) Emmanuel Osei	DF		Waived	
January 31, 2011	(England) Jason Griffiths	MF		Released	
February 18, 2011	(Brazil) Fred	MF	(United States) D.C. United	Traded for a 2013 2nd round SuperDraft pick	
February 28, 2011	(Brazil) Roberto Linck	FW		Released	
March 31, 2011	(United States) Seth Sinovic	DF	(United States) Sporting Kansas City	Waived, free transfer	
June 8, 2011	(Nigeria) Michael Augustine	MF		Waived	
June 30, 2011	(Serbia) Marko Perović	MF		Released	
June 30, 2011	(Serbia) Ilija Stolica	FW		Released	
July 15, 2011	(France) Didier Domi	DF		Released	
July 18, 2011	(France) Ousmane Dabo	MF	None	Retired	

=== Loans ===
==== Out ====
Date	Player	Position	Loaned to	Fee/notes	Ref
April 29, 2011	(United States) Tim Murray	GK	(United States) F.C. New York	Multiple month loan	
April 29, 2011	(Serbia) Ilija Stolica	FW	(United States) F.C. New York	Multiple month loan; released by New England on June 30, 2011	

== Statistics ==
No.	Pos	Nat	Player	Total		Major League Soccer		U.S. Open Cup		2011 Atlanta Pro Soccer Challenge	
No.	Pos	Nat	Player	Apps	Goals	Apps	Goals	Apps	Goals	Apps	Goals
1	GK	(United States) USA	Matt Reis	17	0	17	0	0	0	0	0
2	DF	(Argentina) ARG	Franco Coria	10	0	10	0	0	0	0	0
3	DF	(France) FRA	Didier Domi	9	0	9	0	0	0	0	0
4	DF	(Liberia) LBR	Otto Loewy	0	0	0	0	0	0	0	0
5	DF	(United States) USA	A.J. Soares	19	0	19	0	0	0	0	0
6	MF	(France) FRA	Ousmane Dabo	3	0	3	0	0	0	0	0
7	FW	(The Gambia) GAM	Kenny Mansally	15	0	15	0	0	0	0	
8	MF	(United States) USA	Chris Tierney	15	1	15	1				
9	DF	(Serbia) SRB	Ilija Stolica	2	1	2	1	0	0	0	0
10	FW	(Denmark) DEN	Rajko Lekić	15	3	15	3	0	0		
11	MF	(Zimbabwe) ZIM	Kheli Dube	4	0	2	0	2	0	0	
12	FW	(United States) USA	Alan Koger	0	0	0	0	0	0	0	0
14	MF	(United States) USA	Diego Fagundez	0	0	0	0	0	0	0	0
15	FW	(United States) USA	Zack Schilawski	15	1	15	1	0	0	0	0
16	MF	(Nigeria) NGA	Michael Augustine	1	0	0	0	1	0	0	0
17	MF	(The Gambia) GAM	Sainey Nyassi	18	1	18	1	0	0	0	0
21	MF	(Grenada) GRN	Shalrie Joseph	18	5	18	5	0	0	0	0
22	MF	(United States) USA	Benny Feilhaber	9	0	9	0	0	0	0	
23	MF	(United States) USA	Andrew Sousa	0	0	0	0	0	0	0	0
25	DF	(United States) USA	Darrius Barnes	14	0	14	0	0	0	0	0
26	MF	(United States) USA	Stephen McCarthy	15	2	15	2	0	0	0	
28	DF	(United States) USA	Pat Phelan	14	0	13	0	1	0	0	0
29	MF	(Serbia) SRB	Marko Perović	4	1	4	1	0	0	0	0
30	MF	(United States) USA	Kevin Alston	19	0	19	0	0	0	0	0
33	FW	(United States) USA	Zak Boggs	18	1	17	1	1	0	0	0
34	GK	(United States) USA	Bobby Shuttleworth	3	0	3	0	0	0	0	0
35	FW	(United States) USA	Ryan Kinne	1	0	1	0	0	0	0	0
40	GK	(United States) USA	Tim Murray	0	0	0	0	0	0	0	0
45	DF	(United States) USA	Ryan Cochrane	15	0	15	0	0	0	0	0

Updated to match played June 15, 2011
Source: New England Revolution 2011

=== Starting XI ===
[Starting XI Update needed]

No.	Pos.	Nat.	Name	MS	Notes
1	GK	(United States)	Matt Reis	15	Bobby Shuttleworth has 3 starts
30	RB	(United States)	Kevin Alston	16	Darius Barnes has 11 starts
2	CB	(United States)	Ryan Cochrane	13	Franco Coria has 9 starts
5	CB	(United States)	A. J. Soares	16	
3	LB	(France)	Didier Domi	5	Chris Tierney has 2 start
26	MF	(United States)	Stephen McCarthy	7	
22	MF	(United States)	Benny Feilhaber	7	Pat Phelan has 10 starts
21	CM	(Grenada)	Shalrie Joseph	16	Zak Boggs has 14 starts
29	RW	(Serbia)	Marko Perovic	4	Kenny Mansally has 12 start
15	LW	(United States)	Zack Schilawski	13	Sainey Nyassi has 15 starts
10	CF	(Denmark)	Rajko Lekic	12	

Last updated: April 20, 2011
Source: Squad statistics and Start formations
Only competitive matches.
Using the most used start formation.
Ordered by position on pitch (from back right to front left).

Tactic Order: 4-2-1-2-1

=== Top scorers ===
Includes all competitive matches. The list is sorted by competition level when total goals are equal.

Rank	Nation	Number	Name	MLS	U.S. Open Cup	Atlanta Pro Soccer Challenge	Total
1	(Grenada)	21	Shalrie Joseph	5	0	0	5
2	(Zimbabwe)	11	Kheli Dube	0	2	0	2
3	(United States)	15	Zack Schilawski	1	0	0	1
3	(United States)	26	Stephen McCarthy	1	0	0	1
3	(Serbia)	9	Ilija Stolica	1	0	0	1
3	(Serbia)	29	Marko Perovic	1	0	0	1
3	(Denmark)	10	Rajko Lekic	3	0	0	3
3	(United States)	12	Alan Koger	0	1	0	1

Updated to match played April 27, 2011
Source: New England Revolution

=== Top assists ===
Rank	Nation	Number	Name	MLS	Open Cup	Atlanta Pro Soccer Challenge	Total
1	(The Gambia)	7	Kenny Mansally	1	1	0	2
2	(Serbia)	29	Marko Perovic	1	0	0	1
2	(United States)	22	Benny Feilhaber	1	0	0	1
2	(Grenada)	21	Shalrie Joseph	1	0	0	1
2	(United States)	15	Zack Schilawski	1	0	0	1
2	(United States)	33	Zak Boggs	1	0	0	1
2	(United States)	28	Pat Phelan	1	0	0	1
2	(United States)	12	Alan Koger	0	1	0	1

Updated to match played April 27, 2011
Source: New England Revolution

=== Disciplinary ===
Includes all competitive matches. Players with 1 card or more included only.

Position	Nation	Number	Name	MLS		U.S. Open Cup		Atlanta Pro Soccer Challenge		Total (USSF Total)	
Position	Nation	Number	Name	Booked	Sent off (straight red)	Booked	Sent off (straight red)	Booked	Sent off (straight red)	Booked	Sent off (straight red)
MF	(Grenada)	21	Shalrie Joseph	2	1	0	0	0	0	2	1
DF	(Argentina)	2	Franco Coria	2	0	0	0	0	0	2	0
MF	(United States)	26	Stephen McCarthy	2	0	0	0	0	0	2	0
DF	(United States)	45	Ryan Cochrane	1	0	1	0	0	0	2	0
DF	(United States)	5	A. J. Soares	1	1	0	0	0	0	1	1
MF	(United States)	28	Pat Phelan	0	1	0	0	0	0	0	1
DF	(France)	3	Didier Domi	1	0	0	0	0	0	1	0
DF	(Serbia)	9	Ilija Stolica	1	0	0	0	0	0	1	0
MF	(The Gambia)	7	Kenny Mansally	3	1	0	0	0	0	3	1
DF	(United States)	30	Kevin Alston	1	0	0	0	0	0	1	0
MF	(Serbia)	29	Marko Perovic	1	0	0	0	0	0	1	0
FW	(Denmark)	10	Rajko Lekic	1	0	0	0	0	0	1	0
FW	(United States)	15	Zack Schilawski	1	0	0	0	0	0	1	0
FW	(United States)	33	Zak Boggs	1	0	0	0	0	0	1	0
DF	(United States)	4	Otto Loewy	0	0	1	0	0	0	1	0
FW	(United States)	11	Kheli Dube	0	0	1	0	0	0	1	0
FW	(United States)	12	Alan Koger	0	0	1	0	0	0	1	0
			TOTALS	18	4	4	0	0	0	20	3

=== Club staff ===
Position	Staff
General Manager & Head Coach	(Scotland) Steve Nicol
Assistant Coach	(England) Stephen Myles
Goalkeeper Coach	(Canada) Remi Roy
Vice President, Player Personnel	(United States) Mike Burns
Soccer Operations Manager	(United States) Nick Kropelin
Soccer Operations Coordinator	Stephen Sands
Equipment Manager	Rob Dudley
Head Team Physician	Scott Martin, M.D.
Head Athletic Trainer	Sean Kupiec
Assistant Athletic Trainer	Evan Allen
Massage Therapist	Glenn O'Connor
Chiropractor	Michael Weinman
Spaulding Rehab Specialist	Jennifer Green
Spaulding Rehab Specialist	Tim Needham
Spaulding Rehab Nutritionist	Alice Richer

Last updated: March 28, 2011
Source: New England Revolution

== Competitions ==
=== Overall ===
Competition	Started round	Current position / round	Final position / round	First match	Last match
MLS	1	9 / 7		March 19, 2011	October 20, 2011
U.S. Open Cup	—	—			

Updated to match played April 24, 2011
Source: Competitions

== Standings ==
Pos	Team	Pld	W	L	T	GF	GA	GD	Pts	Qualification
1	LA Galaxy (S, C)	34	19	5	10	48	28	+20	67	CONCACAF Champions League
2	Seattle Sounders FC	34	18	7	9	56	37	+19	63	CONCACAF Champions League
3	Real Salt Lake	34	15	11	8	44	36	+8	53	CONCACAF Champions League
4	FC Dallas	34	15	12	7	42	39	+3	52	
5	Sporting Kansas City	34	13	9	12	50	40	+10	51	
6	Houston Dynamo	34	12	9	13	45	41	+4	49	CONCACAF Champions League
7	Colorado Rapids	34	12	9	13	44	41	+3	49	
8	Philadelphia Union	34	11	8	15	44	36	+8	48	
9	Columbus Crew	34	13	13	8	43	44	−1	47	
10	New York Red Bulls	34	10	8	16	50	44	+6	46	
11	Chicago Fire	34	9	9	16	46	45	+1	43	
12	Portland Timbers	34	11	14	9	40	48	−8	42	
13	D.C. United	34	9	13	12	49	52	−3	39	
14	San Jose Earthquakes	34	8	12	14	40	45	−5	38	
15	Chivas USA	34	8	14	12	41	43	−2	36	
16	Toronto FC	34	6	13	15	36	59	−23	33	CONCACAF Champions League
17	New England Revolution	34	5	16	13	38	58	−20	28	
18	Vancouver Whitecaps FC	34	6	18	10	35	55	−20	28	

Source: MLS
Rules for classification: 1) points; 2) head-to-head record; 3) goal difference; 4) number of goals scored
(C) Champions; (S) Supporters' Shield

=== Results summary ===
Overall								Home						Away					
Pld	Pts	W	L	T	GF	GA	GD	W	L	T	GF	GA	GD	W	L	T	GF	GA	GD
32	27	5	15	12	36	53	−17	4	6	6	17	21	−4	1	9	6	19	32	−13

Last updated: October 13, 2011
Source: MLSSoccer.com Standings
Pld = Matches played; Pts = Points; W = Matches won; T = Matches tied; L = Matches lost; GF = Goals for; GA = Goals against; GD = Goal difference

=== Results by rounds ===
Round	1	2	3	4	5	6	7	8	9	10	11	12	13	14	15	16	17	18	19	20	21	22	23	24	25	26	27	28	29	30	31	32	33	34
Stadium	A	H	H	A	H	A	H	A	H	H	A	H	A	A	H	H	A	A	H	A	A	A	H	H	A	H	H	A	H	A	A	H	H	A
Result	T	W	T	T	L	L	W	L	T	W	L	L	L	L	T	T	L	T	L	W	T	T	L	L	T	T	T	W	L	L	L	L		
Position	9	5	4	5	11	14	12	13	13	11	14	14	15	16	16	16	16	16	17	15	15	15	15	16	16	16	16	16	16	17	17	18		

Updated to match(es) played on October 13, 2011. Source: 2011 Major League Soccer season
A = Away; H = Home; W = Win; L = Loss; T = Tie

== Match results ==
=== Preseason ===
Win Tie Loss

February 18, 2011 1	University of Central Florida	0 - 2	New England Revolution	UCF Soccer and Track Stadium, Orlando
		Report	Kinne 36'; Joseph 61'

February 21, 2011 2	United States U-17	0 - 2	New England Revolution	UCF Soccer and Track Stadium, Orlando
		Report	Tierney 68'; Phelan 73'

February 23, 2011 3	New England Revolution	1 - 0	FC Dallas	ESPN Wide World of Sports Complex, Orlando
	Nyassi 10'	Report

March 6, 2011 4	New England Revolution	2 - 1	Columbus Crew	Finley Stadium, Chattanooga
	Nyassi 43'; Schilawski 81'	Report	Heinemann 91+'

March 9, 2011 5	New England Revolution	1 - 3	Columbus Crew	KSU Soccer Stadium, Kennesaw
	Stolica 62'	Report	Anor 16'; Heinemann 17'; Heinemann 53'

March 13, 2011 6	New England Revolution	1 - 3	Houston Dynamo	KSU Soccer Stadium, Kennesaw
	Schilawski 89'	Report	Bruin 31'; Bruin 33'; Dixon 89'

=== Major League Soccer ===
Kickoff times are in EST.

March 20, 2011 1	Los Angeles Galaxy	1–1	New England Revolution	The Home Depot Center, Carson
20:00	Juninho 39'	Report	Joseph 3'	Attendance: 27,000; Referee: Hilario Grajeda

March 26, 2011 2	New England Revolution	2–1	D.C. United	Gillette Stadium, Foxborough
16:30	Schilawski 8'; Joseph 17' (pen.)	Report	Davies 91+' (pen.)	Attendance: 12,914; Referee: Baldomero Toledo

April 2, 2011 3	New England Revolution	1–1	Portland Timbers	Gillette Stadium, Foxborough
19:30	McCarthy 22'	Report	Jewsbury 38'	Attendance: 7,114; Referee: Terry Vaughn (United States)

April 6, 2011 4	Vancouver Whitecaps FC	1–1	New England Revolution	Empire Field, Vancouver, British Columbia, Canada
19:00 PDT	Hassli 56' (pen.)	Report	Stolica 93+'	Attendance: 19,396; Referee: Baldomero Toledo

April 9, 2011 5	New England Revolution	0–2	Real Salt Lake	Gillette Stadium, Foxborough
19:30		Report	Schuler 27'; Araujo 47'	Attendance: 7,970; Referee: Jasen Anno

April 17, 2011 6	Houston Dynamo	1–0	New England Revolution	Robertson Stadium, Houston
19:00	Freeman 86'	Report		Attendance: 15,176; Referee: Alex Prus

April 23, 2011 7	New England Revolution	3–2	Sporting Kansas City	Gillette Stadium, Foxborough
19:30	Perovic 12'; Joseph 72'; Lekic 83'	Report	Kamara	Attendance: 11,414; Referee: Edvin Jurisevic

April 30, 2011 8	C.D. Chivas USA	3–0	New England Revolution	The Home Depot Center, Carson
22:30	LaBrocca 22'; Mondaini 45'; Moreno 57'	Report		Attendance: 14,058; Referee: Mark Kadlecik

May 7, 2011 9	New England Revolution	0–0	Colorado Rapids	Gillette Stadium, Foxborough
19:30		Report		Attendance: 11,755; Referee: David Gantar

May 14, 2011 10	New England Revolution	1–0	Vancouver Whitecaps FC	Gillette Stadium, Foxborough
19:30	Joseph 49' (pen.)	Report		Attendance: 14,186; Referee: Chris Penso

May 21, 2011 11	San Jose Earthquakes	2–1	New England Revolution	Buck Shaw Stadium, Santa Clara
22:30	McLoughlin 71'; Convey 83'	Report	Tierney 86'	Attendance: 9,736; Referee: Yader Reyes

May 28, 2011 12	New England Revolution	0–1	Los Angeles Galaxy	Gillette Stadium, Foxborough
20:00		Report	López 69'	Attendance: 21,793; Referee: Jorge Gonzalez

June 4, 2011 13	FC Dallas	1–0	New England Revolution	Pizza Hut Park, Frisco
20:30	Chávez 69'	Report		Attendance: 10,363; Referee: Mark Kadlecik

June 10, 2011 14	New York Red Bulls	2–1	New England Revolution	Red Bull Arena, Harrison
20:30	Cochrane 36' (o.g.); Henry 49'	Report	Boggs 54'	Attendance: 21,201; Referee: Terry Vaughn

June 15, 2011 15	New England Revolution	0–0	Toronto FC	Gillette Stadium, Foxborough
20:00		Report		Attendance: 6,680; Referee: Ricardo Salazar

June 18, 2011 16	New England	1–1	Chicago Fire	Gillette Stadium, Foxborough
19:30	Lekic 47'	Report	Oduro 31'	Attendance: 14,246; Referee: Silviu Petrescu

June 26, 2011 17	Seattle Sounders FC	2–1	New England Revolution	Qwest Field, Seattle
16:00	Wahl 33'; Fernández 39'	Report	Nyassi 3'	Attendance: 36,212; Referee: Geoff Gamble

July 4, 2011 18	Real Salt Lake	3–3	New England Revolution	Rio Tinto Stadium, Sandy
20:30	Johnson 23'; Saborio 55' (pen.); Espindola 82'	Report	Lekic 4' (pen.); Tierney 15'; Joseph 62'	Attendance: 16,139; Referee: Yader Reyes

July 17, 2011 19	New England Revolution	0–3	Philadelphia Union	Gillette Stadium, Foxborough
19:00		Report	Ruiz 12'; Valdés 24'; Williams 90'	Attendance: 13,414; Referee: Chris Penso

July 20, 2011 20	D.C. United	0–1	New England Revolution	RFK Memorial Stadium, Washington, D.C.
19:30		Report	McCarthy 74'	Attendance: 15,597; Referee: Michael Kennedy

July 23, 2011 21	Colorado Rapids	2–2	New England Revolution	Dick's Sporting Goods Park, Commerce City
21:00	Folan 65' (pen.); Kimura 82'	Report	Feilhaber 24'; Joseph 90' (pen.)	Attendance: 12,273; Referee: Geoff Gamble

July 30, 2011 22	Sporting Kansas City	1–1	New England Revolution	Sporting Park, Kansas City
20:30	Bunbury 89'	Report	Lekic 38'	Attendance: 17,418; Referee: Terry Vaughn

August 6, 2011 23	New England Revolution	2–3	C.D. Chivas USA	Gillette Stadium, Foxborough
19:30	Joseph 69' (pen.); Fagundez 86'	Report	Moreno 31', 80'; LaBrocca 59'	Attendance: 11,523; Referee: Mark Kadlecik

August 13, 2011 24	Columbus Crew	3–1	New England Revolution	Crew Stadium, Columbus
19:30	Alston 54' (o.g.); James 75'; Renteria 81'	Report	Feilhaber 45'	Attendance: 13,041; Referee: Andrew Chapin

August 17, 2011 25	New England Revolution	1–1	Houston Dynamo	Gillette Stadium, Foxborough
20:00	Cochrane 4'	Report	Boswell 90'	Attendance: 10,963; Referee: Michael Kennedy

August 20, 2011 26	New England Revolution	2–2	New York Red Bulls	Gillette Stadium, Foxborough
19:30	Caraglio 15', 37'	Report	Richards 53', 87'	Attendance: 18,888; Referee: Juan Guzman

September 7, 2011 27	Philadelphia Union	4–4	New England Revolution	PPL Park, Chester
20:00	Torres 28'; Adu 54'; Le Toux 79', 92+'	Report	Soares 9'; Lekic 21'; Zerka 25'; Feilhaber 33'	Attendance: 16,148; Referee: Jorge Gonzalez

September 10, 2011 28	New England Revolution	2 - 0	FC Dallas	Gillette Stadium, Foxborough
19:30	Joseph 14'; Lekic 84'	Report		Attendance: 15,498; Referee: Baldomero Toledo

September 16, 2011 29	Portland Timbers	3 - 0	New England Revolution	Jeld-Wen Field, Portland
23:00	Chara 9'; Cooper 32'; Nagbe 66'	Report		Attendance: 20,323; Referee: Hilario Grajeda

September 25, 2011 30	Chicago Fire	3 - 2	New England Revolution	Toyota Park, Bridgeview
16:00	Grazzini 5' (pen.); Oduro 9'; Nyarko 30'	Report	Guy 90', 92+'	Attendance: 14,576; Referee: Michael Kennedy

October 1, 2011 31	New England Revolution	1 - 2	Seattle Sounders FC	Gillette Stadium, Foxborough
19:30	Fagundez 35'	Report	Montero 36', 47'	Attendance: 21,022; Referee: Jorge Gonzalez

October 8, 2011 32	New England Revolution	1 - 2	San Jose Earthquakes	Gillette Stadium, Foxborough
19:30	Feilhaber 55'	Report	Wondolowski 8', 82'	Attendance: 9,111; Referee: Silviu Petrescu

October 15, 2011 33	New England Revolution	0 - 3	Columbus Crew	Gillette Stadium, Foxborough
19:30		Report	Mendoza 31', 63'; Duka 59'	Attendance: 16,285; Referee: Mark Geiger

October 22, 2011 34	Toronto FC	2 - 2	New England Revolution	BMO Field, Toronto, Ontario, Canada
12:30	Soolsma 20'; Koevermans 83'	Report	Zerka 41'; Caraglio 46'	Attendance: 21,600; Referee: Michael Kennedy

=== U.S. Open Cup ===
April 26, 2011 QR2	D.C. United	2–3	New England Revolution	Maryland SoccerPlex, Boyds
	Boskovic 73', 82'	Report	Dube 34', 47'; Koger 69'	Attendance: 1,843; Referee: Jose Carlos Rivero

May 25, 2011 QR3	Sporting Kansas City	5–0	New England Revolution	Blue Valley Sports Complex, Overland Park
	Myers 9'; Myers 19'; Sapong 24'; Collin 81'; Sapong 88'	Report		Attendance: 1,228; Referee: Sorin Stoica

=== World Football Challenge ===
July 13, 2011 1	New England Revolution (United States)	1–4	(England) Manchester United	Gillette Stadium, Foxborough
20:00	Mansally 56'	Report	Owen 51'; Macheda 54', 61'; Park 80'	Attendance: 51,523; Referee: Mark Geiger

== Miscellany ==
=== Allocation ranking ===
New England is in the #16 position in the MLS Allocation Ranking. The allocation ranking is the mechanism used to determine which MLS club has first priority to acquire a U.S. National Team player who signs with MLS after playing abroad, or a former MLS player who returns to the league after having gone to a club abroad for a transfer fee. New England started 2011 ranked #6 on the allocation list and used its ranking to acquire Benny Feilhaber. A ranking can be traded, provided that part of the compensation received in return is another club's ranking.

=== International roster spots ===
New England has 8 international roster spots. Each club in Major League Soccer is allocated 8 international roster spots, which can be traded. There have been no New England trades involving international spots for the 2011 season. There is no limit on the number of international slots on each club's roster. The remaining roster slots must belong to domestic players. For clubs based in the United States, a domestic player is either a U.S. citizen, a permanent resident (green card holder) or the holder of other special status (e.g., refugee or asylum status).

=== Future draft pick trades ===
Future picks acquired: 2013 MLS SuperDraft Round 2 pick acquired from D.C. United.
Future picks traded: None.
