= Bobby Shuttleworth =

American soccer player (born 1987)

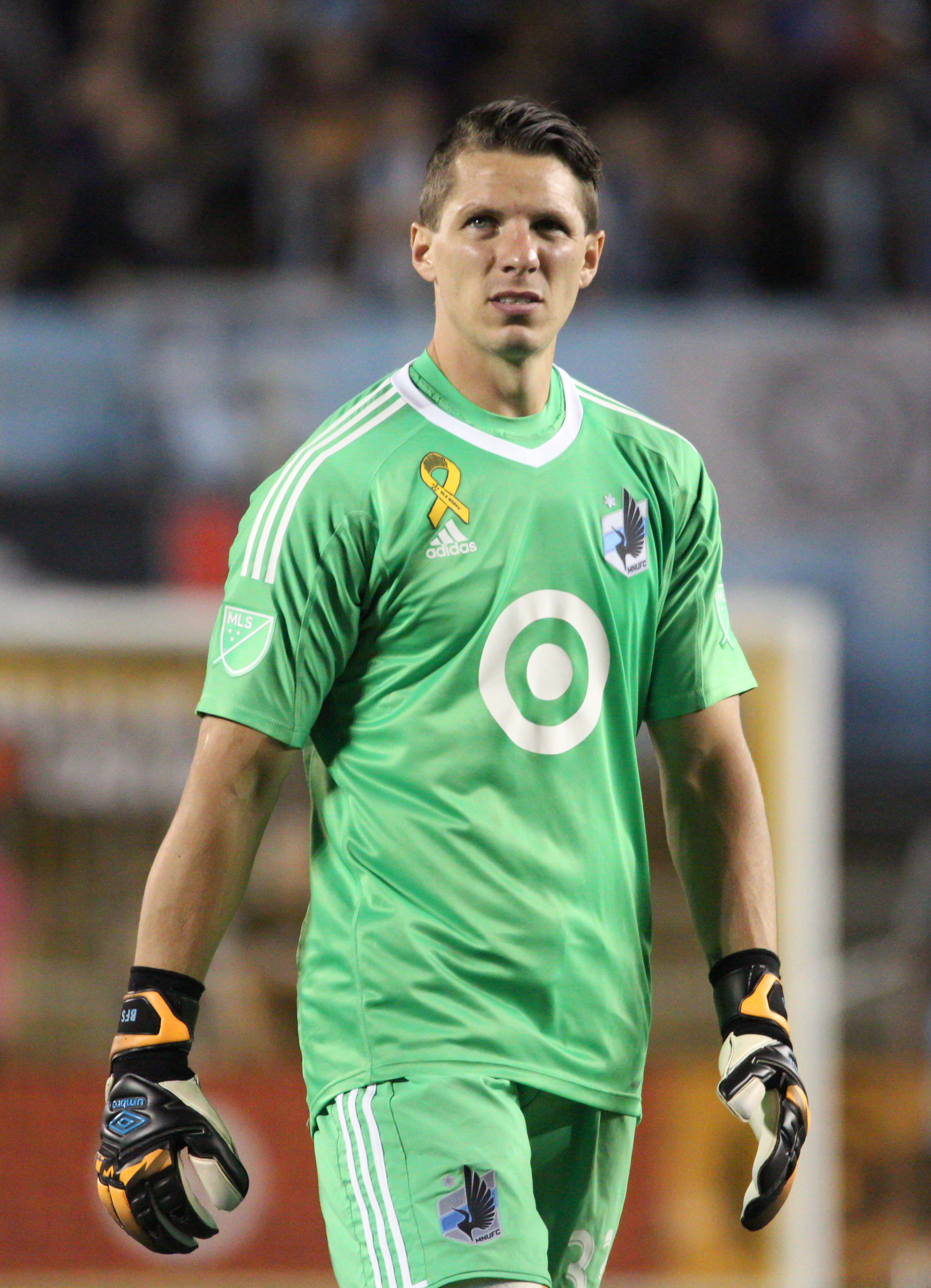
- Shuttleworth playing for Minnesota United in 2017

Personal information
- Full name: Robert Shuttleworth
- Date of birth: May 13, 1987 (age 39)
- Place of birth: Tonawanda, New York, United States
- Height: 6 ft 2 in (1.88 m)
- Position: Goalkeeper

College career
Years	Team	Apps	(Gls)
2005	Loyola Greyhounds		
2006–2008	Buffalo Bulls	35	(0)

Senior career*
Years	Team	Apps	(Gls)
2007	Albany Admirals	14	(0)
2008	Kalamazoo Outrage	9	(0)
2009	Buffalo City	6	(0)
2009–2016	New England Revolution	127	(0)
2009	→ Western Mass Pioneers (loan)	6	(0)
2017–2019	Minnesota United	58	(0)
2019	→ Sacramento Republic (loan)	12	(0)
2020–2021	Chicago Fire	40	(0)
2022	Atlanta United	7	(0)
Total		279	(0)

Managerial career
- 2010–2016: Bentley (assistant)
- 2022–2025: Florida State (assistant)
- 2026–: Texas A&M
- * Club domestic league appearances and goals as of May 28, 2022

Robert "Bobby" Shuttleworth (born May 13, 1987) is the current head coach of the women's soccer team at Texas A&M. He was an American professional soccer player who played as a goalkeeper for multiple teams in MLS and USL Championship.

Shuttleworth spent the bulk of his career with the New England Revolution where he helped lead them to an appearance at the 2014 MLS Cup. He was then traded to Minnesota United in 2017, and later played for Chicago Fire and Atlanta United FC before retiring in 2022.

After retirement he joined the Florida State University women’s soccer team coaching staff from 2022 to 2025. He was hired as the head coach of the Texas A&M Aggies women's soccer team in December 2025.

== Early life ==
Shuttleworth grew up in Buffalo, New York, he began playing goalkeeper at the age of 9. and while attending Nichols School he set the school record with 48 career shutouts. Among his other accolades were winning 2 New York State Private High School Championships as well as earning first-team All-Western New York, All-State and All-East region honors. He finished his high school career with a 20–2–1 record in his senior year.

== Career ==
=== College ===
Shuttleworth initially attended and played college soccer at Loyola College in Baltimore. Eventually, he transferred to the University at Buffalo where he played soccer with the Bulls. He finished with a 0.94 goals against average and an 8–2–2 record. He holds the University at Buffalo for GAA with a 0.80 average in 33 starts for the program with a 20-7-7 record.

During his college years he also played with Kalamazoo Outrage in the USL Premier Development League where he helped the Stu Riddle-led franchise to the elite 8 before succumbing to the eventual 2008 PDL champions Thunder Bay Chill.

=== Professional ===
==== New England Revolution ====
Shuttleworth played briefly with Buffalo City in the National Premier Soccer League before being signed as a free agent on June 18, 2009, by New England Revolution after the Revs played against USL First Division team Austin Aztex in a pre-season match, with whom Shuttleworth was on trial. He signed a one-year deal with an option for another four years and later spent a short time on loan with Western Mass Pioneers in the USL Second Division.

He made his debut for the Revolution in a 3–0 loss against the New York Red Bulls in U.S. Open Cup qualifying on May 12, 2010. He made his first appearance in MLS league play on May 29 vs New York Red Bulls, coming on as a substitute after a serious injury to Preston Burpo. He made his first start the following week, in a 3-0 loss to Seattle Sounders FC on June 5.

Shuttleworth earned his first MLS clean sheet on October 16 in a 1–0 win against visiting Sporting Kansas City. In total Shuttleworth made six appearances (five starts) during the 2010 New England Revolution season.

After recording seven starts in both the 2011 and 2012 Revolution MLS campaigns, Shuttleworth took over as the Revolution's starter in 2013, starting 22 league matches. Shuttleworth set a club record by not allowing a goal in 395 consecutive minutes over a six-game span between May 11 and June 15. By June of that year Shuttleworth was leading the league in the most prominent statistical categories: Goals Against Average (0.75), Shutouts (7) and Save Percentage (.820).

During the 2014 New England Revolution season Shuttleworth started all but two matches of the regular season campaign, posting a career-high 94 saves. On April 19, he made a double-save on a stoppage-time penalty kick attempt by Chicago Fire FC to preserve a 1-1 draw. The effort earned him a nomination for MLS Save of the Week. On August 23 Shuttleworth moved into second place all-time in saves and goalkeeping appearances for the Revolution during a 1-0 victory over Chivas USA. He concluded the regular season as the club's leader in minutes played, with 2880. 2014 would mark the first time Shuttleworth played in the MLS post season; recording a start on November 1 in a 4-2 win over the Columbus Crew, in which he made four saves. Shuttleworth played all 120 minutes of the MLS Cup 2014 final, posting four saves in the Revolution's 2-1 defeat to the LA Galaxy.

Shuttleworth earned five MLS Save of the Week nominations during the 2015 New England Revolution season, making 31 starts, and becoming the second goalkeeper in Revolution history to record 30 wins. On September 19 against the Montreal Impact, Shuttleworth became the 2nd goalkeeper in Revolution history to record 100 starts.

In the 2016 New England Revolution season, Shuttleworth surpassed 10,000 minutes-played for the Revolution, second only to Matt Reis in minutes played by a Revolution goalkeeper. He was named "Santander Man of the Month" for March. He won MLS Save of the Week honors for week four after stopping David Villa's shot in a 1-1 draw with New York City FC on March 16. It was the first time a Revolution keeper had won the award since Matt Reis in 2012.

During his tenure with the Revolution he made 127 total appearances, 124 starts, with 34 clean sheets, 344 saves and a 46-53-28 regular-season record. Along with six postseason starts during the 2014 and 2015 seasons. He’s is also only one of two goalkeepers, (along with Matt Reis) to play in more than 100 matches and see more than 10,000 minutes as a member of the Revolution.

==== Minnesota United and later career ====
On February 15, 2017, Shuttleworth was traded to Minnesota United in exchange for Femi Hollinger-Janzen. Shuttleworth came on late in United's home opener after an injury to starter John Alvbåge, and went on to start the team's next three games. He tended goal for Minnesota United's first MLS point, a 2–2 draw against the Colorado Rapids, and first MLS win, a 4–2 victory over Real Salt Lake. Durring that year he made a career best 33 regular season appearances, claming five clean sheets. In total Shuttleworth made 58 total appearances in three seasons with Minnesota.

On August 6, 2019, Shuttleworth was loaned to USL Championship side Sacramento Republic for the remainder of the season.

Following his release by Minnesota at the end of the 2019 season, Shuttleworth joined Chicago Fire on January 30, 2020. Between 2020 and 2021, Shuttleworth made 40 starts for Chicago tallying eight clean sheets. Following the 2021 season, Shuttleworth's contract with Chicago expired.

On January 14, 2022, Shuttleworth joined Atlanta United on a one-year contract with a club option in 2023.

On July 7, 2022, Shuttleworth announced his retirement from professional soccer. At the time of his retirement he ranked 13th all-time among MLS goalkeepers in regular-season games played 232, with 81 wins and 53 clean sheets.

== Coaching career ==
Shuttleworth has also coached in an assistant coach role at Bentley University.

Beginning with the 2022 season, Shuttleworth is serving as an assistant coach with the Florida State University women's soccer team. Shuttleworth spent four total seasons as a member of the Seminoles’ staff from 2022-25, and was promoted to associate head coach for his last two seasons. He won two NCAA national championships in 2023, and 2025, as a member of the staff.

On December 9, 2025, it was announced Shuttleworth was hired as the new coach of the Texas A&M Aggies women's soccer program.

== Personal life ==
Shuttleworth is married to his wife Geenamarie they have one daughter together.

== Career statistics ==
=== Club ===
As of match played November 8, 2020

Appearances and goals by club, season and competition
Club	Season	League			National Cup		Continental		Other		Total	
Club	Season	Division	Apps	Goals	Apps	Goals	Apps	Goals	Apps	Goals	Apps	Goals
Albany Admirals	2007	USL PDL	14	0	—		—		—		14	0
Kalamazoo Outrage	2008	USL PDL	9	0	—		—		—		9	0
Buffalo City	2009	NPSL	6	0	—		—		—		6	0
New England Revolution	2009	Major League Soccer	0	0	—		—		0	0	0	0
New England Revolution	2010	Major League Soccer	6	0	—		1 (Note: Appearance(s) in North American SuperLiga)	0	—		7	0
New England Revolution	2011	Major League Soccer	7	0	—		—		—		7	0
New England Revolution	2012	Major League Soccer	7	0	1	0	—		—		8	0
New England Revolution	2013	Major League Soccer	23	0	0	0	—		0	0	23	0
New England Revolution	2014	Major League Soccer	32	0	—		—		5 (Note: Appearance(s) in MLS Cup Playoffs)	0	37	0
New England Revolution	2015	Major League Soccer	31	0	—		—		1	0	32	0
New England Revolution	2016	Major League Soccer	21	0	1	0	—		—		22	0
New England Revolution	Total		127	0	2	0	1	0	6	0	136	0
Western Mass Pioneers (loan)	2009	USL 2	6	0	—		—		—		6	0
Minnesota United	2017	Major League Soccer	33	0	—		—		—		33	0
Minnesota United	2018	Major League Soccer	25	0	2	0	—		—		27	0
Minnesota United	2019	Major League Soccer	0	0	0	0	—		0	0	0	0
Minnesota United	Total		58	0	2	0	0	0	0	0	60	0
Sacramento Republic (loan)	2019	USL Championship	12	0	—		—		3 (Note: Appearance(s) in USL Championship Playoffs)	0	15	0
Chicago Fire	2020	Major League Soccer	17	0	—		—		—		17	0
Chicago Fire	2021	Major League Soccer	23	0	—		—		—		23	0
Atlanta United	2022	Major League Soccer	7	0	—		—		—		7	0
Career total			249	0	4	0	1	0	9	0	263	0

== Honors ==
Florida State University women's soccer

- United Soccer Coaches Staff of the Year (2023, 2025)
- NCAA National Championship (2023, 2025 as an assistant)

Individual

- Nichols School Athletic Hall of Fame (2005)
