= 2006 Coupe de la Ligue final =

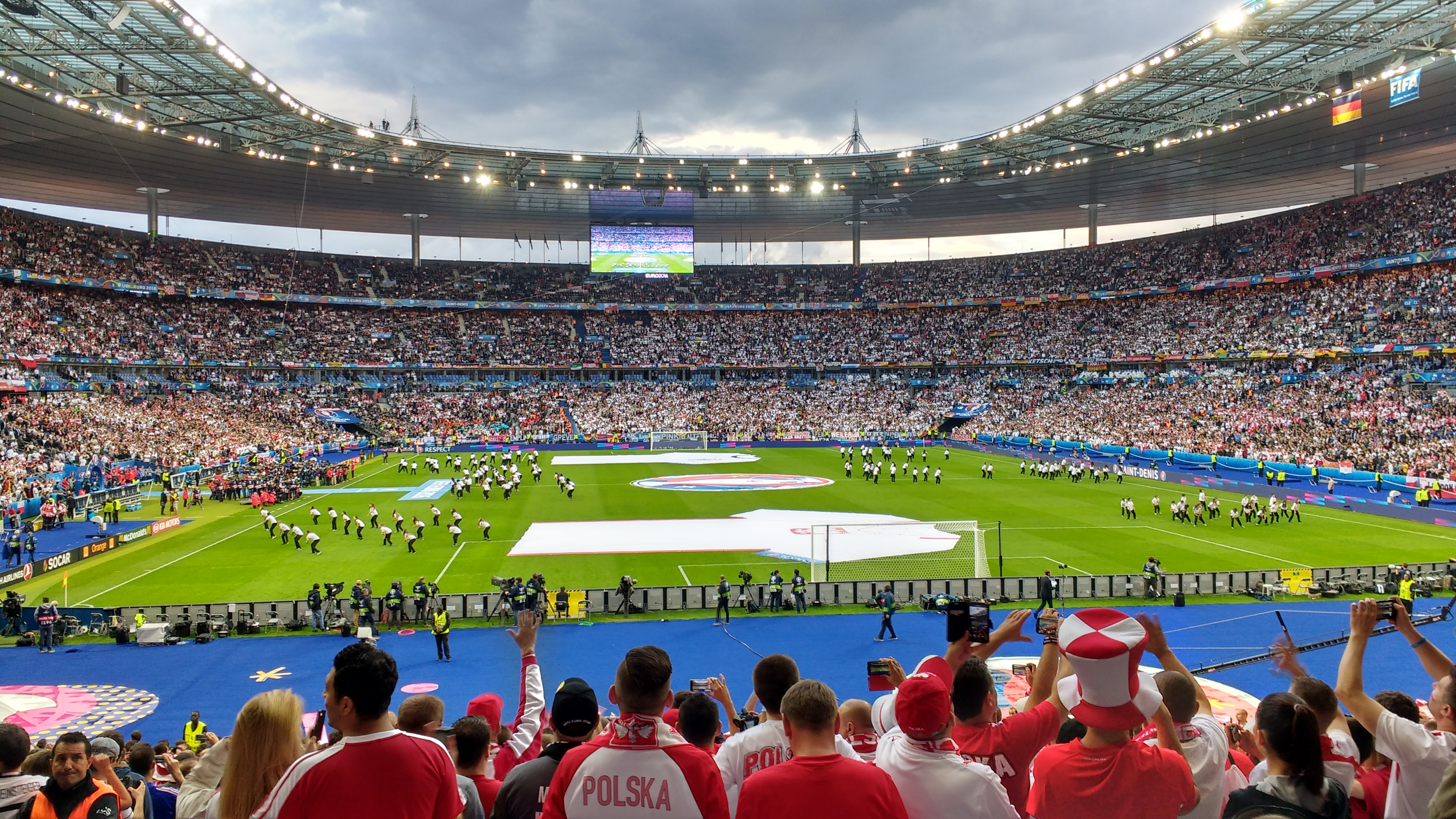
- Event: 2005–06 Coupe de la Ligue
Nancy	Nice
Ligue 1	Ligue 1
2	1
- Date: 22 April 2006
- Venue: Stade de France, Saint-Denis
- Referee: Bertrand Layec
- Attendance: 76,830

The 2006 Coupe de la Ligue final was a football match held at Stade de France, Saint-Denis on 22 April 2006, that saw Nancy defeat Nice 2–1 thanks to goals by Monsef Zerka and Kim.

== Route to the final ==
Note: In all results below, the score of the finalist is given first (H: home; A: away).

Nancy		Round	Nice	
Opponent	Result	2005–06 Coupe de la Ligue	Opponent	Result
Sochaux (H)	1–0	Second round	Châteauroux (H)	2–0 (a.e.t.)
Lorient (H)	1–0	Round of 16	Sedan (H)	2–0
Ajaccio (H)	1–0	Quarter-finals	Bordeaux (H)	2–1 (a.e.t.)
Le Mans (H)	2–0	Semi-finals	Monaco (A)	1–0

== Match details ==
22 April 2006
20:50

Nancy	2–1	Nice
Zerka 22'; Kim 65'		Vahirua 48'

Stade de France, Saint-Denis
Attendance: 76,830
Referee: Bertrand Layec

AS NANCY:
GK	16	(France) Olivier Sorin (c)
DF	3	(Senegal) Pape Diakhaté
DF	4	(France) Cédric Lécluse
DF	8	(France) Frédéric Biancalani
DF	20	(Morocco) Mickaël Chrétien
MF	28	(France) Sébastien Puygrenier	(substituted off) 68'
MF	6	(France) Pascal Berenguer
MF	7	(France) Emmanuel Duchemin	(substituted off) 82'
MF	11	(Morocco) Monsef Zerka
FW	24	(France) Benjamin Gavanon
FW	9	(Brazil) Kim	(substituted off) 90'
Substitutes:
MF	23	(France) Jonathan Brison	(substituted on) 63'
DF	5	(Brazil) André Luiz	(substituted on) 82'
MF	18	(Uruguay) Adrian Sarkissian	(substituted on) 90'
Unused substitutes:
GK	1	(France) Gennaro Bracigliano
FW	22	(Ivory Coast) Elie Kroupi
Manager:
(Uruguay) Pablo Correa Assistant Referees: Fourth Official:

OGC NICE:
GK	1	(France) Hugo Lloris
DF	2	(France) Cédric Varrault (c)
DF	13	(France) Jacques Abardonado
DF	17	(Mali) Sammy Traoré
DF	24	(France) Rod Fanni	(substituted off) 78'
MF	6	(France) Olivier Echouafni	(substituted off) 84'
MF	14	(France) Florent Balmont
MF	26	(France) Cyril Rool
FW	12	(Ivory Coast) Bakari Koné
FW	18	(France) David Bellion
FW	19	(French Polynesia) Marama Vahirua	(substituted off) 70'
Substitutes:
MF	10	(Brazil) Ederson	(substituted on) 70'
MF	8	(France) Sébastien Roudet	(substituted on) 78'
FW	11	(Mali) Mamadou Bagayoko	(substituted on) 84'
Unused substitutes:
GK	16	(France) Damien Gregorini
DF	21	(Algeria) Antar Yahia
Manager:
(France) Frédéric Antonetti

== See also ==
- 2006 Coupe de France final
