= 2012 MLS Re-Entry Draft =

College draft for soccer teams

General information
- Dates: Stage 1: December 7, 2012; Stage 2: December 14, 2012

Overview
- League: Major League Soccer
- Teams: 19

The two-stage 2012 MLS Re-Entry Draft took place on December 7, 2012 (Stage 1), and December 14, 2012 (Stage 2). All 19 Major League Soccer clubs were eligible to participate.

The Stage 1 and Stage 2 Drafts were conducted in the same order as the traditional Waiver Draft, with clubs choosing in reverse order of their 2012 Major League Soccer season finish.

Teams selected players who fell under the following circumstances:

- Players who were at least 23 years old, had a minimum of three years of MLS experience, and whose options were not exercised by their club (available at option salary for 2013).
- Players who were at least 25 years old, had a minimum of four years of MLS experience, were out of contract, and whose club did not offer them a contract at their previous salary (available at 2012 salary).
- Players who were at least 30 years old, had a minimum of eight years of MLS experience, were out of contract, and whose club did not wish to re-sign them (available for at least 105 percent of their 2012 salary).

Players who were not selected in the Stage 1 draft were made available for the Stage 2 draft. Clubs that selected players in Stage 2 must negotiate a new salary with any player not under contract.

Teams also have the option of passing on their selection.

== Available players ==
Players were required to meet age and service requirements to participate as stipulated by the terms of the MLS Collective Bargaining Agreement. Teams had to submit a list of available players to the league by December 3, 2012. The league released a list of all players available for the draft on December 5, 2012. The league released an updated list of players available for Stage 2 of the draft on December 14, 2012.

Player	Position	Released By	Contract Status	Re-Entry Draft Result
Jay Nolly	GK	Chicago Fire	Option Declined	Not selected
Dan Gargan	DF	Chicago Fire	Not Specified	Selected in stage 2 by San Jose Earthquakes
Gonzalo Segares	DF	Chicago Fire	Option Declined	Re-signed with Chicago prior to draft
Corben Bone	MF	Chicago Fire	Option Declined	Withdrew prior to Stage 2 draft
Juan Pablo Ángel	FW	Chivas USA	Out of Contract	Not selected
Danny Califf	DF	Chivas USA	Option Declined	Selected in stage 2 by Toronto FC
Alejandro Moreno	FW	Chivas USA	Option Declined	Not selected
Peter Vagenas	MF	Chivas USA	Out of Contract	Not selected
Chris Birchall	MF	Columbus Crew	Option Declined	Withdrew prior to Stage 2 draft
William Hesmer	GK	Columbus Crew	Option Declined	Selected in stage 2 by Los Angeles Galaxy
Julius James	DF	Columbus Crew	Option Declined	Not selected
Tony Tchani	MF	Columbus Crew	Option Declined	Withdrew prior to draft; Later re-signed with Columbus
Conor Casey	FW	Colorado Rapids	Option Declined	Selected in stage 2 by Philadelphia Union
Hunter Freeman	DF	Colorado Rapids	Option Declined	Selected in stage 2 by New England Revolution
Ian Joyce	GK	Colorado Rapids	Option Declined	Not selected
Tyrone Marshall	DF	Colorado Rapids	Out of Contract	Not selected
Joseph Nane	MF	Colorado Rapids	Option Declined	Not selected
Scott Palguta	DF	Colorado Rapids	Out of Contract	Not selected
Jamie Smith	MF	Colorado Rapids	Option Declined	Not selected
Tyson Wahl	DF	Colorado Rapids	Option Declined	Not selected
Marvell Wynne	DF	Colorado Rapids	Option Declined	Withdrew prior to draft
Mike Chabala	DF	D.C. United	Option Declined	Not selected
Stephen King	MF	D.C. United	Option Declined	Withdrew prior to draft
Maicon Santos	FW	D.C. United	Option Declined	Selected in stage 1 by Chicago Fire
Julian de Guzman	MF	FC Dallas	Out of Contract	Not selected
Bruno Guarda	MF	FC Dallas	Out of Contract	Not selected
Kevin Hartman	GK	FC Dallas	Out of Contract	Not selected
Scott Sealy	FW	FC Dallas	Option Declined	Not selected
Colin Clark	MF	Houston Dynamo	Out of Contract	Selected in stage 2 by Los Angeles Galaxy
Chad Barrett	FW	Los Angeles Galaxy	Option Declined	Selected in stage 2 by New England Revolution
Andrew Boyens	DF	Los Angeles Galaxy	Option Declined	Not selected
Bryan Jordan	DF	Los Angeles Galaxy	Option Declined	Selected in stage 2 by San Jose Earthquakes
Kyle Nakazawa	MF	Los Angeles Galaxy	Option Declined	Withdrew prior to draft
Pat Noonan	FW	Los Angeles Galaxy	Option Declined	Not selected
Brian Perk	GK	Los Angeles Galaxy	Option Declined	Withdrew prior to draft; Later re-signed with Los Angeles
Josh Gardner	DF	Montreal Impact	Option Declined	Traded to Sporting Kansas City prior to draft
Justin Mapp	MF	Montreal Impact	Out of Contract	Withdrew prior to draft; Later re-signed with Montreal
Shavar Thomas	DF	Montreal Impact	Option Declined	Not selected
Blair Gavin	MF	New England Revolution	Option Declined	Not selected
Tim Murray	GK	New England Revolution	Option Declined	Not selected
Bill Gaudette	GK	New York Red Bulls	Option Declined	Not selected
Stephen Keel	DF	New York Red Bulls	Option Declined	Selected in stage 2 by FC Dallas
Chase Harrison	GK	Philadelphia Union	Option Declined	Not selected
Lovel Palmer	DF	Portland Timbers	Option Declined	Selected in stage 2 by Real Salt Lake
Steve Purdy	DF	Portland Timbers	Option Declined	Withdrew prior to draft
Rodney Wallace	DF	Portland Timbers	Option Declined	Re-signed with Portland prior to draft
Paulo Jr.	FW	Real Salt Lake	Option Declined	Selected in stage 2 by Vancouver Whitecaps FC
Kyle Reynish	GK	Real Salt Lake	Option Declined	Not selected
Jean Alexandre	MF	San Jose Earthquakes	Out of Contract	Not selected
Ramiro Corrales	DF	San Jose Earthquakes	Option Declined	Not selected
Joey Gjertsen	MF	San Jose Earthquakes	Option Declined	Not selected
Ike Opara	DF	San Jose Earthquakes	Option Declined	Traded to Sporting Kansas City prior to Stage 2 of Draft
Khari Stephenson	MF	San Jose Earthquakes	Option Declined	Not selected
Tim Ward	DF	San Jose Earthquakes	Out of Contract	Not selected
Mike Seamon	MF	Seattle Sounders FC	Option Declined	Not selected
Andrew Weber	GK	Seattle Sounders FC	Option Declined	Not selected
O'Brian White	FW	Seattle Sounders FC	Option Declined	Withdrew prior to draft
Korede Aiyegbusi	DF	Sporting Kansas City	Option Declined	Not selected
Luke Sassano	MF	Sporting Kansas City	Option Declined	Not selected
Eric Avila	MF	Toronto FC	Out of Contract	Selected in stage 2 by Colorado Rapids
Adrian Cann	DF	Toronto FC	Option Declined	Not selected
Jeremy Hall	DF	Toronto FC	Option Declined	Withdrew prior to Stage 2 draft; Later re-signed with Toronto
Ty Harden	DF	Toronto FC	Option Declined	Selected in stage 2 by San Jose Earthquakes
Andrew Wiedeman	FW	Toronto FC	Option Declined	Withdrew prior to Stage 2 draft; Later re-signed with Toronto
John Thorrington	MF	Vancouver Whitecaps FC	Option Declined	Selected in stage 2 by D.C. United

== Stage One ==
The first stage of the 2012 MLS Re-Entry Draft took place at 3 p.m. on December 7, 2012. All 19 Major League Soccer clubs participated.

=== Round 1 ===
Pick #	Drafting Team	Player	Position	Former Team
1	Toronto FC	PASS		
2	Chivas USA	PASS		
3	Portland Timbers	PASS		
4	New England Revolution	PASS		
5	Philadelphia Union	PASS		
6	Colorado Rapids	PASS		
7	FC Dallas	PASS		
8	Montreal Impact	PASS		
9	Columbus Crew	PASS		
10	Vancouver Whitecaps FC	PASS		
11	Chicago Fire	Maicon Santos	F	D.C. United
12	Real Salt Lake	PASS		
13	New York Red Bulls	PASS		
14	Sporting Kansas City	PASS		
15	San Jose Earthquakes	PASS		
16	Seattle Sounders FC	PASS		
17	D.C. United	PASS		
18	Houston Dynamo	PASS		
19	Los Angeles Galaxy	PASS		

=== Round 2 ===
Pick #	Drafting Team	Player	Position	Former Team
20	Chicago Fire	PASS		

== Stage Two ==
The second stage of the 2012 MLS Re-Entry Draft took place on December 14, 2012. All 19 Major League Soccer clubs were eligible to participate but New York Red Bulls never joined the conference call.

=== Round 1 ===
Pick #	Drafting Team	Player	Position	Former Team
1	Toronto FC	Danny Califf	DF	Chivas USA
2	Los Angeles Galaxy (Note: #2: Chivas USA → Los Angeles Galaxy. 14 December 2012: Los Angeles Galaxy acquired the #2 pick in Stage Two of the 2012 MLS Re-Entry Draft from Chivas USA in exchange for the #19 pick in Stage Two of the 2012 MLS Re-Entry Draft, a first-round selection in the 2013 MLS Supplemental Draft, and a 2013 international roster slot. The traded Supplemental Draft pick is Los Angeles's natural selection.)	Colin Clark	MF	Houston Dynamo
3	Portland Timbers	PASS		
4	New England Revolution	Chad Barrett	FW	Los Angeles Galaxy
5	Philadelphia Union	Conor Casey	FW	Colorado Rapids
6	Colorado Rapids	Eric Avila	MF	Toronto FC
7	FC Dallas	Stephen Keel	DF	New York Red Bulls
8	Montreal Impact	PASS		
9	Columbus Crew	PASS		
10	Vancouver Whitecaps FC	Paulo Jr.	FW	Real Salt Lake
11	Chicago Fire	PASS		
12	Real Salt Lake	Lovel Palmer	DF	Portland Timbers
13	New York Red Bulls	PASS		
14	Sporting Kansas City	PASS		
15	San Jose Earthquakes	Dan Gargan	DF	Chicago Fire
16	Seattle Sounders FC	PASS		
17	D.C. United	John Thorrington	MF	Vancouver Whitecaps FC
18	Houston Dynamo	PASS		
19	Chivas USA (Note: #19: Los Angeles Galaxy → Chivas USA. 14 December 2012: Chivas USA acquired the #19 pick in Stage Two of the 2012 MLS Re-Entry Draft, a first-round selection in the 2013 MLS Supplemental Draft, and a 2013 international roster slot from Los Angeles Galaxy in exchange for the #2 pick in Stage Two of the 2012 MLS Re-Entry Draft. The traded Supplemental Draft pick is Los Angeles's natural selection.)	PASS		

=== Round 2 ===
Pick #	Drafting Team	Player	Position	Former Team
20	Toronto FC	PASS		
21	Los Angeles Galaxy	William Hesmer	GK	Columbus Crew
22	New England Revolution	Hunter Freeman	DF	Colorado Rapids
23	Philadelphia Union	PASS		
24	Colorado Rapids	PASS		
25	FC Dallas	PASS		
26	Vancouver Whitecaps FC	PASS		
27	Real Salt Lake	PASS		
28	San Jose Earthquakes	Ty Harden	DF	Toronto FC
29	D.C. United	PASS		

=== Round 3 ===
Pick #	Drafting Team	Player	Position	Former Team
30	Los Angeles Galaxy	PASS		
31	New England Revolution	PASS		
32	San Jose Earthquakes	Bryan Jordan	DF	Los Angeles Galaxy

=== Round 4 ===
Pick #	Drafting Team	Player	Position	Former Team
33	San Jose Earthquakes	PASS		

After all clubs had passed on the remaining players, clubs were then allowed to draft their own former players. All clubs passed on this option.
