= Michael Augustine (footballer) =

Nigerian footballer (born 1992)

Personal information
- Full name: Michael Augustine
- Date of birth: December 9, 1992 (age 33)
- Place of birth: Kano, Nigeria
- Height: 5 ft 10 in (1.78 m)
- Position: Midfielder

Youth career
- 2005–2008: Abuja

Senior career*
Years	Team	Apps	(Gls)
2008–2011	Abuja	-	(18)
2011	New England Revolution	0	(0)
- * Club domestic league appearances and goals as of April 26, 2011

Michael Augustine (born December 9, 1992, in Kano) is a Nigerian footballer who last played for the New England Revolution of Major League Soccer.

== Club career ==
Augustine began his career with Abuja and was promoted to the club's first team in 2008. While with Abuja he scored 18 goals for the club and helped the squad gain promotion to the Nigerian Premier League in 2009.

On March 4, 2011, the New England Revolution signed Augustine from Nigerian club Abuja. He made his debut for his new team on April 26, 2011, in the Revs' 3–2 win over D.C. United in the Lamar Hunt US Open Cup, and played in several 2011 MLS Reserve Division games, before being waived by New England on June 8, 2011, having never made an MLS appearance.
