= Kim (footballer, born 1980) =

Brazilian footballer

Personal information
- Full name: Carlos Henrique Dias
- Date of birth: 22 June 1980 (age 46)
- Place of birth: Juiz de Fora, Minas Gerais; Brazil
- Height: 1.78 m (5 ft 10 in)
- Position: Striker

Youth career
- Atlético Mineiro

Senior career*
Years	Team	Apps	(Gls)
1999–2003	Atlético Mineiro	55	(10)
2003–2005	Al-Ahli		
2005–2008	AS Nancy	74	(11)
2008–2011	Al-Arabi	16	(3)
2011–2012	Vasco da Gama	8	(1)
2012	Náutico	20	(2)
2013	Joinville	26	(7)
2014	Villa Nova	10	(2)
- * Club domestic league appearances and goals

Carlos Henrique Dias (born 22 June 1980), nicknamed Kim, is a Brazilian former professional footballer who played as a striker.

He played for, among others, Atlético Mineiro in his home country of Brazil, Al-Ahli in Saudi Arabia and AS Nancy in France.

== Playing career ==
=== Atlético Mineiro ===
Born in Juiz de Fora, Kim started his professional career at Atlético Mineiro at the age of just 20. He played professionally for the club for three years in the Campeonato Brasileiro Série A before moving to Saudi Arabia in 2003. Overall, he played in 55 league matches for the Belo Horizonte club, netting 10 goals. In his first season, he helped the club win their 38th Campeonato Mineiro title.

=== Nancy ===
Kim arrived in Nancy in 2005 after a short spell in Saudi Arabia with Al-Ahli. Kim arrived at AS Nancy just after they won promotion to Ligue 1 after finishing first in Ligue 2. In his first season at the club he helped them reach the final of the Coupe de la Ligue against OGC Nice. Kim started the game at the Stade de France in Saint-Denis and went on to score the game's winning goal in the 65th minute. He was taken off in the 90th minute to rapturous applause.

This propelled the team into the UEFA Cup in 2007 with the club reaching the Round of 16 before being knocked out by Shakhtar Donetsk. Overall Kim's time in France was less successful only netting 11 time in 74 Ligue 1 appearances.

=== Al-Arabi ===
At the end of the 2007–08 Ligue 1 season, Kim left AS Nancy for Al-Arabi in Doha, Qatar. In his first season with the club he helped them lift the Qatar Sheikh Jassem Cup. In that season, he helped them finish 6th in the Qatar Stars League.

== Honours ==
- Campeonato Mineiro: 2000
- Arab Champions League: 2003
- Coupe de la Ligue: 2006
- Qatar Sheikh Jassem Cup: 2008
