= Ty Harden =

American soccer player (born 1984)

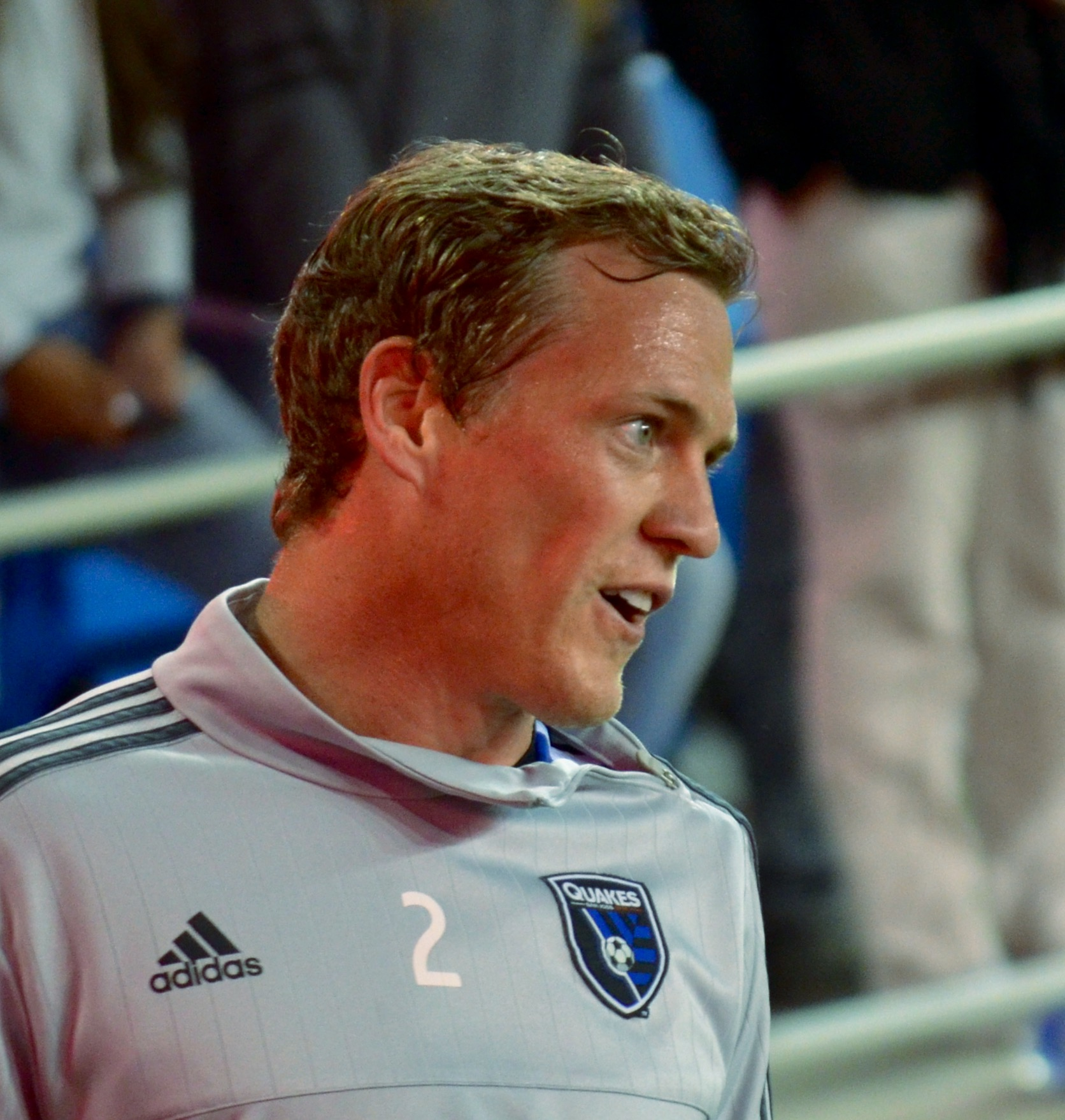

Personal information
- Full name: Robert Tyrel Harden
- Date of birth: March 6, 1984 (age 42)
- Place of birth: Junction City, Oregon, United States
- Height: 6 ft 2 in (1.88 m)
- Position: Defender

Youth career
- 2003–2006: Washington Huskies

Senior career*
Years	Team	Apps	(Gls)
2007	LA Galaxy	24	(0)
2009	Colorado Rapids	7	(0)
2009	→ Rochester Rhinos (loan)	1	(0)
2010–2012	Toronto FC	43	(0)
2013–2015	San Jose Earthquakes	26	(1)
2015	Chicago Fire	3	(0)
- * Club domestic league appearances and goals as of November 30, 2015

Robert Tyrel "Ty" Harden (born March 6, 1984) is an American soccer player who last played for Chicago Fire in Major League Soccer.

== Career ==
=== Collegiate ===
Harden was a regular for four years at the University of Washington, playing every match of his first two seasons before a minor injury in his junior year. He was named team captain as a junior and senior. Before that, he was Oregon's class 3A Player of the Year twice as a junior and senior. He is the only soccer player to have his jersey retired at his high school. He won four youth state championships with FC Portland Blue being coached by Jim Rilat and Jim Brazo, the club was run by the late Clive Charles.

=== Professional ===
Harden was selected by Los Angeles Galaxy in the second round of the 2007 MLS SuperDraft, 23rd overall. He made his MLS debut on April 8, 2007, starting in central defense against the Houston Dynamo in a 0–0 tie.

In February 2008, Harden announced his retirement after only one season as a professional soccer player, deciding instead to work for a charitable organization and to finish college at the University of Washington

Despite retiring in 2008, his rights were transferred to Colorado Rapids on January 13, 2009. In return the Galaxy received a third-round pick in the 2009 MLS SuperDraft. Following the draft, it was announced that Harden would be returning to MLS to play for the Rapids.

Harden was traded on February 10, 2010, to Toronto FC for a third-round draft pick in the 2011 MLS SuperDraft. Shortly after the trade he was joined in Toronto by teammate Nick LaBrocca. Harden suffered a deep gash to his shin that required 22 stitches after a collision while scoring from a corner on April 28, 2010, against rivals Montreal Impact in the first game of the 2010 Canadian Championship.

Harden was released by Toronto on November 15, 2012. He chose to participate in the 2012 MLS Re-Entry Draft and was selected in stage two by San Jose Earthquakes. He signed with the Earthquakes on January 25, 2013. On June 26, 2015, Harden was traded to Chicago Fire in exchange for Quincy Amarikwa. On November 30, 2015, Chicago Fire declined his contract option.

== Honors ==
=== Toronto FC ===
- Canadian Championship (3): 2010, 2011, 2012
