= Darrius Barnes =

American soccer player (born 1986)

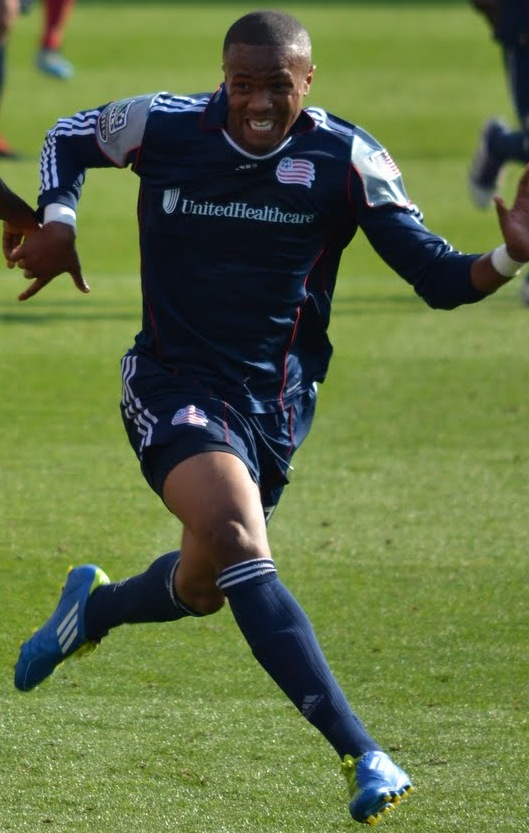
- Barnes in 2011

Personal information
- Date of birth: December 24, 1986 (age 39)
- Place of birth: Raleigh, North Carolina, U.S.
- Height: 6 ft 1 in (1.85 m)
- Position: Defender

Youth career
- 2005–2008: Duke Blue Devils

Senior career*
Years	Team	Apps	(Gls)
2006	Raleigh CASL Elite	11	(2)
2007–2008	Cary RailHawks U23's	27	(1)
2009–2016	New England Revolution	129	(2)
2017	New York Cosmos	13	(0)
Total		180	(5)
- * Club domestic league appearances and goals as of 12:16, 30 October 2017 (UTC)

Darrius Barnes (born December 24, 1986) is an American retired soccer player. He played the majority of his professional career for the New England Revolution of Major League Soccer, the top flight of professional soccer in the United States. He primarily played defender. He is currently the president of Crown Legacy FC, the MLS Next Pro team of Charlotte FC.

== Career ==
=== Youth and college ===
Barnes played high school soccer at Southeast Raleigh High School, in Raleigh, North Carolina. He started for Varsity all four years. His senior year he helped his team to reach the conference finals and defeat a tough Broughton High School team to claim the school's first ever conference championship. His merits include TAAC All-Conference 2005.

Barnes played college soccer at Duke University. During his college years Barnes also played with Raleigh CASL Elite and Cary RailHawks U23's in the USL Premier Development League.

=== Professional ===
Barnes was drafted in the third round (40th overall) of the 2009 MLS SuperDraft by New England Revolution on 15 January 2009, officially signing for the club on 17 March 2009. He made his professional debut on 21 March 2009, in New England's first game of the 2009 MLS season against the San Jose Earthquakes. He became the second rookie in the history of MLS to play every minute of every game, following in the footsteps of former Revs center back Michael Parkhurst, who was the first to accomplish the feat in 2005. He was also the only outfield player to play every minute of every game in the 2009 season, and helped the Revolution establish a club-record 386-minute shutout streak.

In 2011, Barnes was a finalist for the MLS Fair Play Award.

On 22 September 2012 against the New York Red Bulls, Barnes scored his first-ever (and only) professional goal, finding the net in the 95th minute of the match to help the Revolution salvage a 1-1 draw. He made his 100th MLS appearance on 15 March 2014, and recorded his 100th MLS start on 7 September 2014 against the Chicago Fire.

Following his release from New England at the end of the 2016 season, Barnes joined North American Soccer League side New York Cosmos on 24 March 2017.

On 15 December 2017, Barnes announced his retirement from playing professional soccer.

=== Post-playing career ===
After retiring from active play, Barnes joined the Major League Soccer offices and as of June, 2020 was working for the league in marketing.

In March 2022, Charlotte FC named Barnes the president of their MLS Next Pro team Crown Legacy FC.
