= Monsef Zerka =

Moroccan footballer (born 1981)

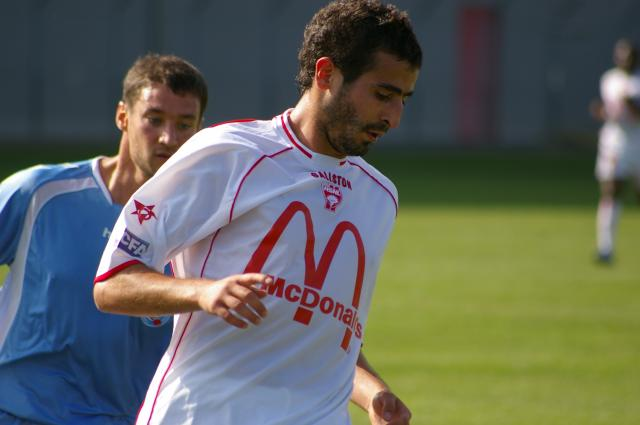
- Monsef Zerka

Personal information
- Date of birth: 30 August 1981 (age 45)
- Place of birth: Orléans, France
- Height: 1.83 m (6 ft 0 in)
- Positions: Midfielder; winger; forward

Youth career
- 1994–2001: Nancy

Senior career*
Years	Team	Apps	(Gls)
2001–2009	Nancy	176	(17)
2009–2011	Nantes	35	(2)
2011	Iraklis	9	(0)
2011	New England Revolution	7	(2)
2012	Petrolul Ploieşti	12	(2)
2013–2014	Tanjong Pagar	48	(21)
Total		287	(44)

International career
2004	Morocco U23	2	(0)
2001–2008	Morocco	10	(2)
- * Club domestic league appearances and goals

Monsef Zerka (Arabic: منصف زرقا, born 30 August 1981) is a former professional footballer. He originally played as a striker, but throughout his career he has also played as a fullback and as a midfielder. Born in France, he represented Morocco at international level.

== Club career ==
=== Nancy ===
Zerka was born in Orléans. After playing for US Orléans as a youngster, Zerka was signed by Nancy on the recommendation of his coach Jacques Quéré. He completed the final years of his apprenticeship at Nancy before making his debut in 2001. He debuted in a 4–0 home win against Caen, coming in as a late substitute in the 83rd minute.

Before finally signing professional forms (initially a three-year contract) with Nancy in August 2002, Zerka had made his debut for the Morocco national team.

After playing in various positions over the years, Zerka proved effective in a forward role in Nancy's first season back in the top flight, scoring 6 goals in 24 appearances and continued in this position in 2006–07. He left AS Nancy in the summer of 2009, after playing 173 league matches for the club and scoring 17 goals. In Ligue 1, he featured in 85 matches and scored 13 goals.

Zerka will be remember by AS Nancy supporters for scoring the first goal of Nancy in the Final of the 2006 Coupe de la Ligue. It was the first major trophy won by the club since the 1978 French Cup.

=== Nantes ===
On 31 August 2010, Zerka signed for Ligue 2 outfit FC Nantes. Zerka debuted for his new in a 2–1 home win against Racing Strasbourg. He also scored his first goal for Nantes in his debut. It was the 1–1 equalizer, scored in the 22nd minute of the match after an assist by Jean-Claude Darcheville. He scored his second, and last, league goal for Nantes in the next match against SC Bastia. It was scored in the 7th minute of the match and it was the opening goal, in a match that ended as a 1–1 draw. It was scored after an assist by Djamel Abdoun. In the next season Zerka remained goalless for Nantes in the league. He scored his only goal that season, in a French Cup 4–2 away defeat by US Boulogne. On 7 January 2011, Nantes and Zerka mutually agreed to part ways. During his spell at Nantes Zerka featured in 35 Ligue 2 games, scoring 2 goals.

=== Iraklis ===
On 14 January 2011, Zerka signed a contract with Super League Greece club Iraklis until the summer of 2012. He debuted for Iraklis on 23 January 2011, as he was in the starting line-up in a 3–0 away defeat by AO Kavala.

=== New England Revolution ===
Zerka left Iraklis on a mutual agreement after their relegation from the Greek top flight, and he subsequently signed with Major League Soccer club New England Revolution on 18 August 2011. Zerka became one of the few bright spots in the Revolution's dismal 2011 campaign. He made his Revolution debut, and scored his first Revolution goal, on 7 September 2011 in a 4–4 draw with the Philadelphia Union. He made his home debut 3 days later in a home win over FC Dallas. He scored his second and final goal for the Revolution in the final match of the Revolution season, a 2–2 draw at Toronto FC.

The Revolution declined Zerka's contract on 30 November 2011. In seven matches (all starts) Zerka concluded his Revolution career with two goals and an assist.

=== Petrolul Ploieşti ===
In March 2012, he signed with the Romanian club Petrolul Ploieşti, scoring 2 goals in 12 matches.

=== Tanjong Pagar United ===
Zerka joined Singapore League (S.League) club Tanjong Pagar United in January 2013. He made his league debut on 22 February 2013 against Balestier Khalsa, scoring a goal in the match that ended 3–1 win to Tanjong Pagar United. On 27 February 2013, in only his second league match, Zerka scored his first career hat-trick against Warriors, which Tanjong Pagar United won 6–1. On 4 October 2013, Zerka scored a hat-trick 2 goals and 1 own goal to helped Tanjong Pagar United become the first team to qualify for the 2013 Singapore Cup.

== International career ==
Zerka make his debut for Morocco in a friendly match on 14 November 2001 against Zambia.

=== 2004 Summer Olympics football tournament ===
Zerka was a member of the Moroccan squad for the 2004 Summer Olympics football tournament. He was a starter in Morocco's first match, a 0–0 draw against Costa Rica. In the second match, a 1–2 defeat by Portugal, Zerka was once again a starter, but he was substituted in the 72nd minute by Tajeddine Sami. He watched Morocco's third and last match in the tournament from the bench. The match ended up a 2–1 victory for Morocco, its only victory in the tournament. Morocco got 4 points, equal to those of Costa Rica, but it was eliminated from the tournament, as it had scored fewer goals than Costa Rica.

=== 2008 African Cup of Nations ===
Zerka also featured in the Morocco squad for the 2008 Africa Cup of Nations in Ghana. In the opening match for Morocco, he came in as a substitute for Youssouf Hadji in the 70th minute. He managed to score a header for Morocco 4 minutes after his entrance in the game. It was his team's last goal in 1-5 devastation against Namibia and Zerka's first goal for his country. He was a starter in his team's next match, a 3–2 defeat by Guinea, but he was substituted in the 80th minute by El Moubarki. In the next match Morocco had to compete against host nation Ghana. Zerka came in as a substitute for Aboucherouane in the 55th minute of the match, but he was unable to help his team overturn Ghana's 2–0 lead. Morocco finished 3rd in its group and was eliminated.

==== International goals ====
No	Date	Venue	Opponent	Score	Result	Competition
1	21 January 2008	Accra Sports Stadium, Accra, Ghana	Namibia	1–5	1–5	2008 Africa Cup of Nations
2	20 August 2008	Marrakesh Stadium, Marrakesh, Morocco	Macau	3–1	3–1	Friendly

== Honours ==
Nancy

- Ligue 2: 2004–05
- Coupe de la Ligue: 2006
