= A. J. Soares =

American soccer player (born 1988)

Personal information
- Full name: Anthony James Soares
- Date of birth: November 28, 1988 (age 37)
- Place of birth: Solana Beach, California, United States
- Height: 6 ft 0 in (1.83 m)
- Position: Center back

College career
Years	Team	Apps	(Gls)
2007–2010	California Golden Bears	77	(10)

Senior career*
Years	Team	Apps	(Gls)
2010	Orange County Blue Star	1	(0)
2011–2014	New England Revolution	108	(6)
2015–2016	Viking	32	(0)
2016	AGF	6	(1)
Total		147	(7)
- * Club domestic league appearances and goals

Anthony James Soares (born November 28, 1988) is an American retired soccer player who played as a center back for Orange County Blue Star, New England Revolution, Viking and AGF.

== Career ==
=== Early life, college and amateur ===
Soares was born in Solana Beach, California. He attended Torrey Pines High School where he was the captain for his junior and senior seasons, and won the 2005 Division 1 CIF Championship.

He played college soccer at the University of California, Berkeley. As the Cal co-captain in 2010, Soares was named a National Soccer Coaches Association of America First Team All American, Pac-10 Player of the Year, Goal.com Player of the Year. Soares entered college at California as an attacking player, but head coach Kevin Grimes converted him to a central defender because of his size and strength. However, he still managed to score five goals in his final collegiate season while anchoring a stingy Bear defense; during this campaign, he was named a semifinalist for the 2010 Hermann Trophy.

In 2010 Soares made one appearance for Orange County Blue Star in the USL Premier Development League.

=== Professional ===
Soares was chosen by New England Revolution as the sixth overall pick in the 2011 MLS SuperDraft. He made his Revolution debut in the 2011 New England Revolution season opener on March 20, 2011, playing the full 90 minutes in a 1-1 draw with the LA Galaxy. He made his home debut the following week, in a 2-1 win over D.C. United. Soares scored his first professional goal on September 7 in a 4-4 draw against the Philadelphia Union. In his rookie campaign Soares made 28 appearances (all starts). He was subsequently named New England Revolution defender of the Year for 2011.

In the 2012 New England Revolution season, Soares made 30 appearances (all starts), recording two goals. During the 2013 New England Revolution season Soares made 18 appearances (17 starts) and notched one goal, on October 19 in a 3-2 win over the Columbus Crew.

Soares started and played the entire 2014 MLS Cup. He garnered press coverage in the match for helping seemingly-injured LA Galaxy keeper Jaime Penedo to his feet before immediately tossing him back on the ground.

Soares was voted "Player's Player" and Defender of the Year for New England in 2014.

In February 2015, Soares was presented as the newest addition to the Norwegian Tippeligaen club Viking FK. On July 26, 2016, Soares signed a two-year contract with AGF.

In November 2016, he retired from professional football, due to a serious head injury.

== Personal life ==
Soares' father is Portuguese and was born in the Azores. He also holds an Italian passport. He married Michele Mossman in 2014 in a ceremony in La Quinta, CA. The couple have three children.
