= Eddie Ababio =

Ghanaian-American soccer player (born 1988)

Personal information
- Full name: Edward Kwame Ababio
- Date of birth: January 1, 1988 (age 38)
- Place of birth: Accra, Ghana
- Height: 5 ft 11 in (1.80 m)
- Position: Defender

Youth career
- 2004–2005: IMG Soccer Academy

College career
Years	Team	Apps	(Gls)
2006–2010	North Carolina Tar Heels	65	(12)

Senior career*
Years	Team	Apps	(Gls)
2006	Bradenton Academics	0	(0)
2007–2009	Carolina Dynamo	25	(10)
2011–2012	Colorado Rapids	0	(0)
2012	Tampa Bay Rowdies	1	(0)
2013	Carolina RailHawks	4	(0)
2013	Águila	16	(0)
2014	Tampa Marauders	9	(0)

International career^{‡}
2004–2005	United States U17	13	(3)

Managerial career
- 2022–: Tampa Bay United (assistant)
- * Club domestic league appearances and goals as of June 11, 2015 ‡ National team caps and goals as of September 25, 2012

Edward Kwame Ababio (born January 1, 1988) is a Ghanaian-American retired soccer player.

== Career ==
=== College and amateur ===
Born in Accra, Ghana, Ababio lived for several years in Tampa, Florida where he played for HC United and Gaither High School before joining the US Under-17 national team residency at the IMG Soccer Academy in Bradenton, Florida. He played for the UNC Tar Heels in college where he featured regularly almost throughout his time at the school (he was medically redshirted after making three appearances in the 2009 season).

During his college years Ababio also played with Carolina Dynamo in the USL Premier Development League, and was on the roster of the Bradenton Academics, but did not feature in any games for the Florida team due to injury.

=== Professional ===
Ababio was drafted in the first round (18th overall) of the 2011 MLS SuperDraft by the Colorado Rapids. He signed with the Rapids on April 14, 2011.

Ababio made his professional debut in a group stage match on September 28, 2011, in the 2011–12 CONCACAF Champions League, scoring in his debut against Isidro Metapán of El Salvador.

Ababio was waived by Colorado on June 28, 2012.
