= 2011 MLS SuperDraft =

College draft for soccer teams

General information
- Sport: Soccer
- Date: January 13, 2011
- Time: 12:00 p.m. (ET)
- Location: Baltimore, Maryland
- Network: ESPN2

Overview
- 54 total selections
- First selection: Omar Salgado, Vancouver Whitecaps FC
- Most selections: New England Revolution; Seattle Sounders FC (5 selections)
- Fewest selections: Real Salt Lake; San Jose Earthquakes (1 selection)

The 2011 MLS SuperDraft was the twelfth annual SuperDraft presented by Major League Soccer. It was held on January 13, 2011, in Baltimore, Maryland, during the 2011 NSCAA Convention at the Baltimore Convention Center. The 2011 SuperDraft consisted of three rounds with eighteen selections each, for a total of 54 players selected during the draft. The draft preceded the 2011 MLS season.

== Changes from 2010 ==
- As expansion clubs, Vancouver and Portland received the first and second picks in the SuperDraft.
- The SuperDraft has contracted in number of rounds, from four to three, making it the shortest SuperDraft in terms of rounds.

== Player selection ==
54 players were selected during the 3 rounds. Vancouver Whitecaps FC had the first overall selection in the 2011 SuperDraft, followed by Portland Timbers. The following eight selections were from teams that failed to qualify for the 2010 MLS Cup Playoffs, starting with the team holding the lowest amount of 2010 regular season points (3 points per win, one point per draw). The subsequent eight selection positions of clubs were sorted by fewest regular season points, from among teams that went out in the same round of the MLS Cup Playoffs. As similar in other drafts, teams were allowed to trade these rights away to other teams for other rights such as players, special roster spots, or other rights of interest. Participating players in the 2011 draw were confirmed in December 2010.

On January 5, 2011, MLS announced that it was eliminating the previously planned fourth-round of the 2011 SuperDraft and re-introducing a three-round Supplemental Draft. Previously traded fourth-round 2011 SuperDraft selections became traded first-round 2011 MLS Supplemental Draft selections.

The selection order was released by the league on January 7, 2011.

Any player marked with an * is part of the Generation Adidas program.

*	Denotes player who has been selected for an MLS Best XI team

=== Round One ===
Pick #	MLS team	Player	Position	Affiliation
1	Vancouver Whitecaps FC	(United States) *Omar Salgado	Forward	United States U-20
2	Portland Timbers	(United States) *Darlington Nagbe	Forward	University of Akron; Cleveland Internationals
3	D.C. United	(United States) *Perry Kitchen	Midfielder	University of Akron; Chicago Fire Premier
4	Chivas USA	(United States) *Zarek Valentin	Defender	University of Akron; Reading United; Michigan Bucks
5	Philadelphia Union	(United States) *Zac MacMath	Goalkeeper	University of Maryland
6	New England Revolution	(United States) A. J. Soares	Defender	University of California, Berkeley; Orange County Blue Star
7	Houston Dynamo	(United States) *Kofi Sarkodie	Defender	University of Akron; Michigan Bucks
8	Vancouver Whitecaps FC (Note: #8: Toronto FC → Vancouver Whitecaps. 25 November 2010: Vancouver acquired this first-round 2011 selection from Toronto FC in exchange for midfielder Nathan Sturgis.)	(United States) *Michael Nanchoff	Midfielder	University of Akron; Cleveland Internationals
9	Chicago Fire	(United States) Jalil Anibaba	Defender	University of North Carolina; Carolina Dynamo
10	Sporting Kansas City	(United States) C. J. Sapong	Forward	James Madison University; Reading United
11	Houston Dynamo (Note: 11: Seattle Sounders FC → Portland Timbers → Houston Dynamo. 13 January 2011: Houston acquired this pick from Portland in exchange for allocation money. Earlier in the same day, Portland had acquired this pick and use of an international roster spot for the 2011 season from Seattle in exchange for pick #20 and allocation money.)	* (United States) Will Bruin	Forward	Indiana University
12	Columbus Crew	(United States) Rich Balchan	Defender	Indiana University; Chicago Fire Premier
13	New York Red Bulls	(United States) *Corey Hertzog	Forward	Pennsylvania State University; Reading United
14	Chivas USA (Note: 14: Real Salt Lake → Chivas USA. 13 January 2011: Chivas USA acquired this pick from Real Salt Lake in exchange for allocation money. (Note: Sorensen, Mike (January 13, 2011). "With the No. 14 pick of MLS draft, Real Salt Lake takes cash". The Deseret News.))	(Ecuador) Víctor Estupiñán	Forward	LDU Quito
15	Columbus Crew (Note: 15: San Jose Earthquakes → Columbus Crew. 13 January 2011: Columbus acquired this pick and allocation money from San Jose in exchange for forward Steven Lenhart. (Note: Mitchell, Shawn (January 14, 2011). "Lenhart trade brings striker from Michigan". The Columbus Dispatch.))	(Iraq) Justin Meram	Forward	University of Michigan
16	Los Angeles Galaxy	(Uruguay) Paolo Cardozo	Midfielder	Quilmes
17	FC Dallas	(United States) Bobby Warshaw	Defender	Stanford University
18	Colorado Rapids	(United States) Eddie Ababio	Defender	University of North Carolina

=== Round Two ===
Pick #	MLS team	Player	Position	Affiliation
19	Vancouver Whitecaps FC	(United States) Jeb Brovsky	Midfielder	University of Notre Dame
20	Seattle Sounders FC (Note: #20: Portland Timbers → Seattle Sounders FC. 13 January 2011: Seattle acquired this pick and allocation money from Portland in exchange for pick #11 and use of an international roster spot for the 2011 season.)	(Ghana) *Michael Tetteh	Defender	UC Santa Barbara
21	Seattle Sounders FC (Note: #21: D.C. United → Seattle Sounders FC. 30 April 2010: Seattle acquired this second-round 2011 selection from D.C. United in exchange for midfielder Stephen King.)	(United States) Leone Cruz	Defender	Southern Methodist University; Austin Aztex U23
22	Portland Timbers (Note: #22: Chivas USA → Real Salt Lake → Portland. 24 November 2010: Portland acquired this second-round 2011 selection from Real Salt Lake in exchange for forward Arturo Alvarez. Real Salt Lake had acquired a conditional second-round selection in 2010 or 2011 from Chivas USA in exchange for defender Carey Talley on 9 May 2008. Chivas kept its 2010 selection so RSL received this 2011 selection to complete the trade.)	(United States) Chris Taylor	Defender	University of Tulsa
23	Philadelphia Union	(United States) Michael Farfan	Midfielder	University of North Carolina; Ogden Outlaws
24	New England Revolution	(United States) Stephen McCarthy	Midfielder	University of North Carolina; Carolina Dynamo
25	New York Red Bulls (Note: #25: Houston → New York Red Bulls. 27 May 2009: New York acquired this second-round 2011 selection and a first-round 2010 MLS SuperDraft selection (pick #14) from Houston in exchange for forward Dominic Oduro.)	(England) John Rooney	Midfielder	Macclesfield Town
26	Toronto FC	(Philippines) Demitrius Omphroy	Defender	University of California, Berkeley; Bay Area Ambassadors
27	Seattle Sounders FC (Note: #27: Chicago → Seattle. 30 July 2010: Seattle acquired this second-round 2011 selection, originally a conditional pick, from Chicago in exchange for midfielder Freddie Ljungberg.)	(United States) Servando Carrasco	Midfielder	University of California, Berkeley
28	Columbus Crew (Note: #28: Sporting Kansas City → Philadelphia → Columbus Crew. 22 November 2010: Columbus acquired this second-round 2011 selection from Philadelphia in exchange for midfielder Brian Carroll. (Note: Mitchell, Shawn (December 28, 2010). "SuperDraft primer". The Columbus Dispatch.) Philadelphia had acquired this pick, a second-round 2012 MLS SuperDraft selection, and allocation money from Kansas City in exchange for defender Shavar Thomas on 30 June 2010.)	(United States) Cole Grossman	Midfielder	Duke University; Cary Clarets
29	Seattle Sounders FC	(United States) Bryan Meredith	Goalkeeper	Monmouth University; Central Jersey Spartans
30	New York Red Bulls (Note: #30: Columbus → New York. 18 March 2009: New York acquired a conditional selection in the 2011 SuperDraft from Columbus in exchange for defender Eric Brunner. The conditional selection became this pick.)	(United States) Tyler Lassiter	Defender	North Carolina State University
31	D.C. United (Note: #31: New York → D.C. United. 16 September 2010: D.C. United acquired a conditional 2011 second-round selection, which became this pick, from New York in exchange for defender Carey Talley.)	(United States) Chris Korb	Defender	University of Akron; Cleveland Internationals
32	Sporting Kansas City (Note: #32: Real Salt Lake → Sporting Kansas City. 23 February 2010: Kansas City acquired this second-round 2011 selection and an international roster spot from Real Salt Lake in exchange for midfielder Luis Gil. Kansas City will also receive 25 percent of any future transfer fee received for Gil.)	(United States) J. T. Murray	Defender	University of Louisville; Chicago Fire Premier
33	San Jose Earthquakes	(Thailand) Anthony Ampaipitakwong	Midfielder	University of Akron; Bradenton Academics
34	Los Angeles Galaxy	(United States) Héctor Jiménez	Midfielder	University of California, Berkeley; Bay Area Ambassadors
35	FC Dallas	(United States) Charlie Campbell	Midfielder	University of Louisville
36	Colorado Rapids	(United States) Colin Givens	Defender	Michigan State University; Michigan Bucks

=== Round Three ===
Pick #	MLS team	Player	Position	Affiliation
37	Vancouver Whitecaps FC	(United States) Bilal Duckett	Defender	University of Notre Dame
38	New York Red Bulls (Note: #38: Portland Timbers → New York Red Bulls. 22 November 2010: New York acquired this third-round 2011 selection from Portland in exchange for midfielder Jeremy Hall.)	(United States) Billy Cortes	Defender	University of Maryland
39	New England Revolution (Note: #39: D.C. United → New England Revolution. 23 April 2009: New England acquired a conditional SuperDraft pick in 2010 or 2011, which became this pick, from D.C. United in exchange for defender Avery John. New England did not receive a pick from D.C. in the 2010 MLS SuperDraft.)	(United States) Steven Perry	Forward	University of Notre Dame; Indiana Invaders
40	Chivas USA	(United States) Jon Okafor	Midfielder	Brown University; Central Jersey Spartans
41	Philadelphia Union	(Ivory Coast) Levi Houapeu	Forward	University of Maryland, Baltimore County; Reading United
42	New England Revolution	(United States) Ryan Kinne	Midfielder	Monmouth University; Central Jersey Spartans
43	Toronto FC (Note: #43: Houston → Toronto FC. 12 March 2010: Toronto FC acquired this third-round 2011 selection from Houston in exchange for defender Adrian Serioux.)	(United States) Matt Gold	Defender	Ohio State University
44	Toronto FC (Note: #44: Toronto FC → Colorado Rapids → Toronto FC. 25 March 2010: Toronto FC acquired this third-round 2011 selection and midfielder Nick LaBrocca from Colorado in exchange for defender Marvell Wynne. Colorado had acquired this pick from Toronto FC in exchange for defender Ty Harden on 10 February 2010.)	(El Salvador) Efrain Burgos, Jr.	Midfielder	California Polytechnic State University; Chicago Fire Premier
45	Chicago Fire	(United States) Jason Herrick	Forward	University of Maryland
46	Sporting Kansas City	(Poland) Konrad Warzycha	Midfielder	Ohio State University
47	Seattle Sounders FC	(United States) Alex Caskey	Midfielder	Davidson College; Atlanta Blackhawks
48	Columbus Crew	(Venezuela) Bernardo Anor	Midfielder	University of South Florida; Bradenton Academics
49	Toronto FC (Note: #49: New York Red Bulls → Chicago Fire → Toronto FC. 13 January 2011: Toronto FC acquired this pick from Chicago Fire in exchange for goalkeeper Jon Conway. Chicago had acquired this pick, a first-round 2008 MLS SuperDraft selection (#7), and cash from New York in exchange for Master Tactician Juan Carlos Osorio on 18 December 2007.)	(Ecuador) Joao Plata	Midfielder	LDU Quito
50	D.C. United (Note: #50: Real Salt Lake → Los Angeles → Real Salt Lake → Los Angeles → D.C. United. 13 January 2011: D.C. United acquired this pick from Los Angeles in exchange for two first-round selections in the 2011 MLS Supplemental Draft. Los Angeles had acquired this third-round 2011 selection from Real Salt Lake in exchange for a third-round selection (#39) in the 2010 MLS SuperDraft on 14 January 2010. Earlier the same day, Real Salt Lake had re-acquired this pick and pick #15 in the 2010 SuperDraft from Los Angeles in exchange for forward Clint Mathis and pick #16 in the 2010 SuperDraft. Los Angeles had previously acquired the pick from Real Salt Lake in exchange for the rights to forward Clint Mathis on 14 August 2008. The original trade reported that the draft pick acquired by LA was a conditional fourth-round selection in the 2010 SuperDraft. However, RSL kept its 2010 fourth-round pick and instead sent this pick, its 2011 third-round selection, to LA to complete the 14 August 2008 trade for Mathis.)	(United States) Joe Willis	Goalkeeper	University of Denver; Real Colorado Foxes
51	Chicago Fire (Note: #51: San Jose → Chicago. 6 August 2010: Chicago acquired a conditional draft pick in 2011, which became this selection, from San Jose in exchange for defender Tim Ward.)	(United States) Davis Paul	Forward	University of California, Berkeley
52	Real Salt Lake (Note: #52: Los Angeles → Real Salt Lake. 22 January 2009: Real Salt Lake acquired a conditional draft pick in 2011, which became this selection, and allocation money from Los Angeles in exchange for midfielder Dema Kovalenko.)	(United States) Jarad Van Schaik	Midfielder	University of Portland
53	FC Dallas	(United States) Scott Gordon	Defender	Lynn University; Baton Rouge Capitals
54	New England Revolution (Note: #54: Colorado → New England. 22 January 2010: New England acquired this third-round 2011 selection, goalkeeper Preston Burpo, defender Cory Gibbs, and allocation money from Colorado in exchange for midfielder Jeff Larentowicz and midfielder Wells Thompson.)	(United States) Alan Koger	Forward	College of William & Mary

== Selections by position ==
Round	Forwards	Midfielders	Defenders	Goalkeepers
1st	6	4	7	1
2nd	0	9	8	1
3rd	5	10	2	1
Totals	11	23	17	3

== Other Draft Day Trades ==
- Los Angeles Galaxy acquired forward Chad Barrett from Toronto FC in exchange for future considerations. Ives Galarcep reported that the future considerations consisted of $125,000 in allocation money and TFC assuming a portion of Barrett's salary.

== Trade notes ==
- Real Salt Lake acquired midfielder Will Johnson from Chicago Fire in a trade on 22 August 2008. In return, Chicago was to receive a natural fourth-round 2009 MLS SuperDraft selection and a second-round 2011 SuperDraft selection from RSL. However, the trade also contained a clause that allowed Chicago to receive allocation money in lieu of the draft picks. Chicago chose the allocation money.
- San Jose Earthquakes acquired a conditional 2011 SuperDraft selection and a second-round 2010 MLS SuperDraft selection (#28) from Real Salt Lake in exchange for forward Pablo Campos on July 15, 2009. The conditional 2011 selection was contingent on Campos starting 8 games for Real Salt Lake in 2009. Campos started only 5 games so San Jose did not receive the conditional 2011 draft pick.

== Notable undrafted players ==
=== Homegrown players ===
Original MLS team	Player	Position	College	Conference	Notes
New York Red Bulls	Connor Lade	Defender	St. John's	Big East	
Sporting Kansas City	Kevin Ellis	Defender	Barton (KS)	KJCCC	

== See also ==
- 2011 MLS Supplemental Draft
- MLS SuperDraft
- Major League Soccer
- Generation Adidas
- Draft (sports)
