= Alan Koger =

American soccer player

Personal information
- Full name: Alan Koger
- Date of birth: September 25, 1987 (age 39)
- Place of birth: Spencer, Virginia, United States
- Height: 6 ft 2 in (1.88 m)
- Position: Forward

Youth career
- 2006–2010: William & Mary Tribe

Senior career*
Years	Team	Apps	(Gls)
2008–2009	Virginia Legacy	8	(3)
2011	New England Revolution	0	(0)
- * Club domestic league appearances and goals as of November 23, 2011

Alan Koger (born September 25, 1987) is an American soccer player.

== Career ==
=== College and amateur ===
Koger attended Magna Vista High School, where he played both soccer and was his school's American football placekicker, and played club soccer for Greensboro Soccer Club 87 Green, before going on to play college soccer at the College of William & Mary, where he was given the nickname "Cabbage."

After redshirting his freshman season, Koger was named to the CAA All-Rookie Team in 2007, was named to the All-CAA Second-Team as a junior in 2009, and was an All-CAA First-Team honoree, was named to the All-South Atlantic Region Second-Team, and the VaSID All-State First-Team after appearing in 22 games and scoring 10 goals as a senior in 2010.

During his college years Koger also played with Virginia Legacy in the USL Premier Development League.

=== Professional ===
Koger was drafted in the third round (54th overall) of the 2011 MLS SuperDraft by New England Revolution. He made his professional debut and scored his first professional goal on April 26, 2011, in the Revs' 3–2 victory over D.C. United in the Lamar Hunt US Open Cup.

Koger was waived by New England on November 23, 2011.
