= Otto Loewy =

Liberian footballer (born 1987)

Personal information
- Full name: Otto Loewy
- Date of birth: June 4, 1987 (age 39)
- Place of birth: Monrovia, Liberia
- Height: 5 ft 10 in (1.78 m)
- Position: Defender

Youth career
- 2005–2008: Winthrop Eagles

Senior career*
Years	Team	Apps	(Gls)
2011	New England Revolution	0	(0)
- * Club domestic league appearances and goals as of April 26, 2011

Otto Loewy (born June 4, 1987, in Monrovia) is a Liberian footballer.

== Career ==
=== Youth and college ===
Loewy moved from his native Liberia to the United States as a child, settling with his family in Lawrenceville, Georgia. After attending Norcross High School, Loewy was a standout college soccer player at Winthrop University. He was his team's MVP for the 2008 season, was named to the 2006 adidas/Gamecock Classic All-Classic Team, the 2006 JAKO Classic All-Classic Team and was MVP of the Winthrop/Wingate Inn Classic in 2007. He finished his college career with five goals and 11 assists in 79 career starts.

=== Professional ===
After suffering an injury while playing for Winthrop during the 2008 NCAA College Soccer tournament, Loewy was not able to take part in the 2009 MLS Combine, and as such was not drafted in the 2009 MLS SuperDraft.

After almost a year away from the game, Loewy signed his first a professional contract on March 31, 2011, when he signed with New England Revolution. He made his professional debut on April 26, 2011, in the Revs' 3–2 win over D.C. United in the Lamar Hunt US Open Cup.

Loewy was waived by New England on November 23, 2011.
