= Tim Murray (soccer) =

American soccer player

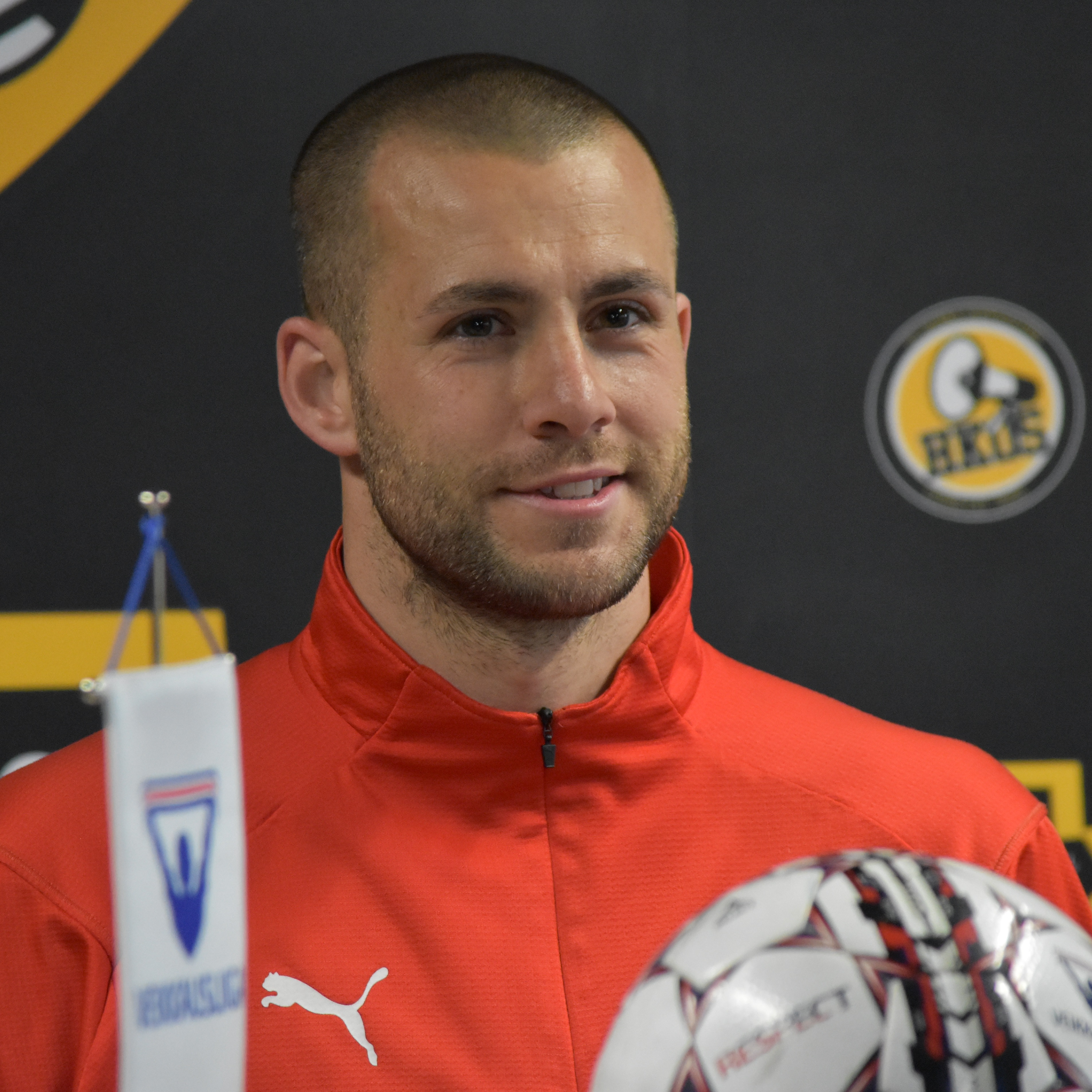

Personal information
- Full name: Timothy Murray
- Date of birth: July 30, 1987 (age 39)
- Place of birth: Haverhill, Massachusetts, United States
- Height: 6 ft 2 in (1.88 m)
- Position: Goalkeeper

College career
Years	Team	Apps	(Gls)
2005–2009	Providence Friars		

Senior career*
Years	Team	Apps	(Gls)
2008–2009	New Hampshire Phantoms	25	(0)
2010–2012	New England Revolution	0	(0)
2011	→ F.C. New York (loan)	1	(0)
2013–2015	Carolina RailHawks	1	(0)
2015	Ekenäs SC	26	(0)
2016–2017	EIF	27	(0)
2017–2021	Honka	108	(0)
2022	Chattanooga Red Wolves	0	(0)

Managerial career
- 2010–2012: Brandeis Judges (goalkeeping)
- 2012: Providence Friars (goalkeeping)
- 2014: Holy Cross Crusaders (goalkeeping)
- 2022: Baylor Red Raiders (assistant)
- 2023–2024: Northern Colorado Hailstorm (goalkeeping)
- 2025–: San Jose Earthquakes II (goalkeeping)
- * Club domestic league appearances and goals

Tim Murray (born July 30, 1987) is an American former soccer player.

== Career ==
=== College ===
Murray attended St. John's Preparatory School in Danvers, Massachusetts, and played four years of college soccer at Providence College. He holds the Providence College record for most career shutouts, and helped the Friars reach the NCAA Tournament in 2006 and 2007. He played in 60 career college games, and compiled 201 saves.

Murray also spent two seasons with the New Hampshire Phantoms of the USL Premier Development League.

=== Professional ===
Murray signed his first professional contract on April 29, 2010, when he signed with Major League Soccer team New England Revolution. Because of injuries to other keepers, he finished his rookie season second on the Revs' goalkeeper depth chart after starting preseason as the fourth goalkeeper in camp, but did not make a senior MLS appearance.

Murray was loaned to F.C. New York of the USL Professional Division in 2011 after FCNY's first choice goalkeeper Derby Carillo suffered an injury. He made his professional debut on April 30, 2011, in a 2–1 loss to Orlando City.

Murray was released by New England on December 2, 2012. He entered the 2012 MLS Re-Entry Draft and became a free agent after going undrafted in both rounds of the draft.

In March 2015, Murray signed a one-year contract with Ekenäs Sport Club, a newly promoted club in Kakkonen in the third tier of the Finnish football league system.

On February 2, 2022, Murray signed with Chattanooga Red Wolves in USL League One.

=== Coaching ===
In February 2023, Murray took his first full-time coaching job by joining the staff of USL League One's Northern Colorado Hailstorm. In 2025, Murray joined San Jose Earthquakes II — known as The Town FC at the time through a naming rights partnership — as goalkeeper coach.

== Honors ==
=== Individual ===
- Veikkausliiga Goalkeeper of the Year: 2020
- Veikkausliiga Team of the Year: 2020
