= Buffalo City FC =

- Full name: Buffalo City Football Club
- Founded: 2008
- Dissolved: 2009
- Ground: Nichols School; Buffalo, New York
- Capacity: 4,000
- Chairman: (England) Andrew Moore
- Manager: (England) Andrew Moore
- League: National Premier Soccer League
- 2009: Regular Season: 2nd, Keystone; Playoffs: did not qualify
Home colors	Away colors

Buffalo City FC was an American soccer team based in Buffalo, New York, United States. Founded in 2008, the team played only one season (2009) in the National Premier Soccer League (NPSL), a national premier league at the fourth tier of the American Soccer Pyramid, in the Eastern Keystone Division. They sold their rights as a club in the league to another group in Western New York, who then formed FC Buffalo.

The team played all its 2009 home games at the stadium on the campus of Nichols School. The team's colors were black, burgundy and gold.

== History ==
Buffalo City FC was founded in 2008 and was divided into five integral parts, (First Team, Youth Training/Academy, International Development, Youth Camps and Clinics, and Community Outreach). Buffalo City FC also had its own European training academy, AFA Marbella, located in Marbella, Spain. After just one season in the NPSL, in which the team finished second in the Keystone Conference, Buffalo City FC sold their franchise rights to FC Buffalo, who took their place in the NPSL.

== Players ==
=== 2009 Roster ===
as of July 1, 2009 Note: Flags indicate national team as defined under FIFA eligibility rules; some limited exceptions apply. Players may hold more than one non-FIFA nationality.

No.	Pos.	Nation	Player
1	GK	USA	Bart Loos
2	DF	USA	Alex Mihal
3	DF	USA	Casey Derkacz
4	DF	USA	Herbert Deleon
5	DF	USA	Jake Schindler
6	MF	USA	Peter Marlette
8	MF	USA	Justin Fredsell
9	FW	USA	Marsalis Beckford
10	MF	USA	Mike Share

No.	Pos.	Nation	Player
11	MF	USA	Marco Stencel
12	DF	USA	Dan Cavanaugh
13	MF	USA	Chris Griffiths
14	DF	USA	Judah Manetta
15	FW	ENG	Daniel Waymont
16	MF	CAN	Roshard Gilbert
17	MF	BRA	Igor Popovich
18	GK	USA	Scott Brody
19	DF	USA	Jeffrey Taylor

== Year-by-year ==
Year	Division	League	Regular season	Playoffs	Open Cup
2009	4	NPSL	2nd, Keystone	Did not qualify	Did not enter

== Head coaches ==
- (England) Mike Share (2008-2009)
- (England) Andrew Moore (2009)

== Stadia ==
- Stadium at Nichols School; Buffalo, New York (2009)
