= Zak Boggs =

American soccer player (born 1986)

Personal information
- Full name: Zak Devin Boggs
- Date of birth: December 25, 1986 (age 39)
- Place of birth: Marietta, Ohio, U.S.
- Height: 6 ft 1 in (1.85 m)
- Positions: Forward; attacking midfielder

Youth career
- 2004: IMG Academy

College career
Years	Team	Apps	(Gls)
2005	West Virginia Mountaineers	0	(0)
2006	UCF Knights	17	(5)
2007–2009	USF Bulls	44	(9)

Senior career*
Years	Team	Apps	(Gls)
2004–2009	Bradenton Academics	80	(49)
2010–2012	New England Revolution	29	(3)
2013	IMG Academy Bradenton	5	(1)
2014	Charlotte Eagles	27	(3)
2015	Tampa Bay Rowdies	10	(0)
2016	Pittsburgh Riverhounds	26	(0)
Total		177	(56)
- * Club domestic league appearances and goals as of September 26, 2016

Zak Devin Boggs (born December 25, 1986) is an American former professional soccer player who played as a forward or attacking midfielder.

== Career ==
=== College and amateur ===
Boggs grew up in Vienna, West Virginia, and attended Parkersburg High School before transferring to IMG Academy in Bradenton, Florida. He played college soccer at West Virginia University, the University of Central Florida and the University of South Florida, where he was named to the Big East All-Tournament Team, earned All-Big East Third Team honors, was named Big East Male Scholar-Athlete of the Year, and was named to the ESPN The Magazine Academic All-America and All-District teams as a junior.

During his college years Boggs also played for six seasons with the Bradenton Academics in the USL Premier Development League, scoring 49 goals in 80 appearances.

== Professional ==
Boggs was drafted in the second round (31st overall) of the 2010 MLS SuperDraft by the New England Revolution.

He made his professional debut on March 27, 2010, in New England's opening game of the 2010 MLS season against the Los Angeles Galaxy. On May 8, 2010, Boggs made his first MLS start and scored his first two goals in the Revs' 3–2 loss to the Columbus Crew.

Boggs signed a new contract with New England on March 2, 2011.

On August 10, 2012, Boggs announced his departure from the Revolution to accept a Fulbright scholarship to study at Leicester University.

Boggs returned to professional soccer in March 2014 when he signed with Charlotte Eagles of USL PRO.

Boggs signed with Tampa Bay Rowdies of the North American Soccer League in February 2015. He was released by Tampa Bay in November 2015.

On January 6, 2016, Boggs and Rowdies teammate Corey Hertzog joined the Pittsburgh Riverhounds.

== Personal ==
Boggs graduated from the University of South Florida with a degree in biomedical sciences. He was nominated as a Rhodes scholar. Boggs completed an MS degree in marketing from the University of South Florida in 2010. In 2012, Boggs received a Fulbright Scholarship to study cancer cell and molecular biology at the University of Leicester in Leicester, UK. Boggs attended The Ohio State University College of Medicine and earned his medical degree in May 2021. He completed his intern year of general surgery at The Mount Carmel Health Systems in Columbus, Ohio. He is currently in his Interventional Radiology residency at University of South Florida, in Tampa, Florida having started on July 1, 2021.

== Honors ==
=== Individual ===
- MLS Humanitarian of the Year Award: 2011
