= Andrew Sousa =

American-Portuguese soccer player

Personal information
- Date of birth: September 26, 1989 (age 37)
- Place of birth: Fall River, Massachusetts, United States
- Height: 6 ft 1 in (1.85 m)
- Position: Midfielder

Youth career
- 2007: Limestone Saints
- 2008–2010: Providence Friars

Senior career*
Years	Team	Apps	(Gls)
2009	Rhode Island Stingrays	16	(2)
2010	Forest City London	3	(0)
2011	New England Revolution	0	(0)
2012–2013	Operário	12	(0)
2013	Real Boston Rams	6	(2)
2013	Ottawa Fury	9	(5)
2014	Fylkir	20	(6)
2017–2018	Brooklyn Italians	?	(?)
- * Club domestic league appearances and goals as of January 27, 2015

Andrew Sousa (born September 26, 1989) is a former professional soccer player.

== Career ==
=== College and amateur ===
Sousa attended B.M.C. Durfee High School (1978), where he served as team captain during his senior year and played his club soccer for Bayside United, Blackwatch Rhode Island, and Nor'easter.

Sousa began his college soccer career at Limestone College, eventually transferring to Providence College prior to his sophomore season. Ending his career with 8 goals and 8 assists in three years for the Friars, Sousa scored the eventual game winner in the Semi-finals of the Big East Tournament. In helping the Friars earn a trip to the Big East Championship, Sousa was selected for the Big East All Tournament Team.

During his college years, Sousa played in the USL Premier Development League for the Rhode Island Stingrays and Forest City London.

=== Professional ===
Sousa was drafted in the third round (42nd overall) of the 2011 MLS Supplemental Draft by the New England Revolution. He made his professional debut on May 25, 2011, in New England's 5–0 loss in the 2011 Lamar Hunt U.S. Open Cup to Sporting Kansas City. Sousa went on to make 8 appearances for the reserve team, scoring 2 goals. Sousa was waived by New England on November 23, 2011.

At the start of the 2012–13 season, Sousa signed with Portuguese Segunda Divisão club CD Operário on August 22, 2012. After playing the first half of the season, Sousa terminated his contract with the Portuguese side on February 1, 2013.

On February 26, 2014, Sousa signed with Icelandic, Úrvalsdeild side Fylkir. During the 2014 Úrvalsdeild campaign, Sousa led Fylkir to a 6th-place finish in the league. He led the team in goals (6) and assists (7) in all competitions, recording three game winning goals. On October 4, 2014, with a UEFA Europa League place on the line, Sousa recorded 1 goal and 1 assist in a Man of the Match performance. However, Fylkir fell short of reaching a UEFA Europa League spot falling to relegated side Fram Reykjavik 4–3.
