= Franco Coria =

Argentine footballer

Personal information
- Full name: Franco Coria
- Date of birth: July 8, 1988 (age 38)
- Place of birth: Los Toldos, Argentina
- Height: 6 ft 0 in (1.83 m)
- Position: Centre back

Team information
- Current team: Instituto ACC

Youth career
- 2007–2008: Chacarita Juniors

Senior career*
Years	Team	Apps	(Gls)
2008–2012	Chacarita Juniors	19	(0)
2011–2012	→ New England Revolution (loan)	18	(0)
2012	Colegiales	0	(0)
2012–2016	Sarmiento	58	(0)
2016	Crucero del Norte	19	(0)
2016–2017	Douglas Haig	35	(0)
2017–2018	Blooming	28	(0)
2018–2019	Cipolletti	13	(0)
2019–	Instituto ACC	5	(0)
- * Club domestic league appearances and goals as of 20:38, 2 May 2019 (UTC)

Franco Coria (born July 8, 1988, in Los Toldos) is an Argentine footballer who currently plays as a defender for Instituto ACC.

== Club career ==
Coria joined Chacarita Juniors in 2007 and during the 2008 season was promoted to the first team. for the team's reserve side during the last four seasons. During the 2008–09 season Coria made eight appearances in Argentina's Nacional B, as Chacarita won promotion to the Primera Division for the 2009–10 season. During the club's one-year stay in the top division Coria started five games and made three appearances as a substitute.

On February 17, 2011, the New England Revolution signed Coria.
