= Ryan Kinne =

American soccer player

Personal information
- Full name: Ryan Kinne
- Date of birth: August 31, 1989 (age 37)
- Place of birth: Waterbury, Connecticut, U.S.
- Height: 5 ft 8 in (1.73 m)
- Positions: Attacking midfielder; forward

Youth career
- –2007: South Central Premier
- 2007–2010: Monmouth Hawks

Senior career*
Years	Team	Apps	(Gls)
2010	Central Jersey Spartans	10	(3)
2011	New England Revolution	1	(0)
2012	Connecticut FC Azul	15	(8)
2013	Pittsburgh Riverhounds	23	(2)
- * Club domestic league appearances and goals as of October 17, 2013

Ryan Kinne (born August 31, 1989) is an American former soccer player.

== Career ==
=== College and amateur ===
Kinne played his college career at Monmouth University where he was an NSCAA All-American, Hermann Trophy semi-finalist and Northeast Conference player of the year in both his Junior and Senior seasons. In 77 career games, he scored 35 goals, including 12 as a senior in 2010. He also added 21 assists, including six as a senior.

Kinne also played in for Central Jersey Spartans in the USL Premier Development League during their inaugural season.

=== Professional ===
On January 14, 2011, Kinne was drafted in the third round (#42 overall) in the 2011 MLS SuperDraft by the New England Revolution. He signed with the club on March 3, 2011. Kinne made his professional debut for the New England Revolution on March 26, 2011, coming on as a 90th-minute substitute in a 2–1 win over D.C. United

Kinne was waived by New England on March 5, 2012.

Kinne signed with USL Premier Development League club Connecticut FC Azul on March 27, 2012.

On February 15, 2013, Kinne moved back to a professional level when he signed for USL Pro club Pittsburgh Riverhounds.
