= 2011 San Jose Earthquakes season =

San Jose Earthquakes
2011 season
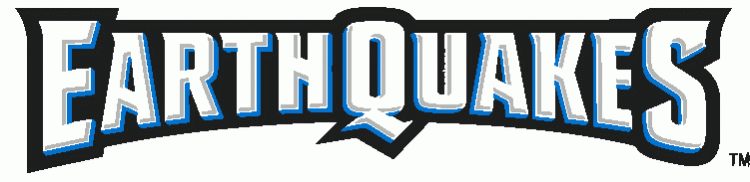
- Owner: Earthquakes Soccer, LLC
- Coach: Frank Yallop
- Stadium: Buck Shaw Stadium
- Major League Soccer: Conference: 7th Overall: 14th
- MLS Cup Playoffs: Did not qualify
- U.S. Open Cup: Did not qualify
- California Clásico: 2nd
- Heritage Cup: 2nd
- Top goalscorer: Chris Wondolowski (16)
- Average home league attendance: 11,858
Home colors	Away colors	Third colors

The 2011 San Jose Earthquakes season was the club's 14th year of existence, as well as its 14th season in Major League Soccer and its fourth consecutive season in the top-flight of American soccer. This is the 29th season of a club bearing the "Earthquakes" name.

== Squad ==
As of September 15, 2011.

Note: Flags indicate national team as defined under FIFA eligibility rules; some limited exceptions apply. Players may hold more than one non-FIFA nationality.

No.	Pos.	Nation	Player
1	GK	USA	David Bingham
2	DF	USA	Bobby Burling
3	DF	USA	Chris Leitch
4	MF	USA	Sam Cronin
5	MF	USA	Brad Ring
6	DF	USA	Ike Opara
7	MF	JAM	Khari Stephenson
8	FW	USA	Chris Wondolowski (vice-captain)
9	FW	TTO	Scott Sealy
10	MF	ENG	Simon Dawkins (on loan from Tottenham Hotspur)
11	MF	USA	Bobby Convey
12	MF	USA	Ramiro Corrales (captain)
13	GK	USA	Andrew Weber
14	FW	USA	Maxwell Griffin (on loan from Orlando City)
15	DF	USA	Justin Morrow

No.	Pos.	Nation	Player
16	FW	USA	Alan Gordon
17	MF	USA	Joey Gjertsen
18	GK	USA	Jon Busch
19	MF	USA	Jacob Peterson
20	DF	USA	Tim Ward
21	DF	USA	Jason Hernandez
23	MF	USA	Anthony Ampaipitakwong
24	FW	USA	Steven Lenhart
25	FW	USA	Ellis McLoughlin
27	DF	CAN	Nana Attakora
28	MF	BRA	André Luiz
30	MF	MEX	Rafael Baca
32	FW	USA	Matt Luzunaris
33	MF	USA	Steven Beitashour

=== Reserves ===
This list shows players who have played for the team in official 2011 MLS Reserve Division games, but are not part of the senior roster.

Note: Flags indicate national team as defined under FIFA eligibility rules; some limited exceptions apply. Players may hold more than one non-FIFA nationality.

No.	Pos.	Nation	Player
—	MF	USA	Ian Thomas
—	FW	USA	James Callinan
—	MF	USA	David Frank
—	MF	USA	Nick Lima

No.	Pos.	Nation	Player
—	MF	PUR	Yuri Morales
—	MF	USA	Travis Pillon
—	DF	USA	Yousef Samy
—	FW	USA	Christopher Wright

=== Management ===
Position	Staff
General Manager	(United States) John Doyle
Head Coach	(Canada) Frank Yallop
Assistant Coach	(United States) Ian Russell
Assistant Coach	(Canada) Mark Watson
Goalkeeper Coach	(New Zealand) Jason Batty
Athletic Trainer	(United States) Bruce Morgan
Equipment Manager	(El Salvador) Jose Vega
Team Administrator	(United States) Joe Dincecco
Team Doctor	(United States) Dr. Michael Oberlander

Last updated: November 21
Source: San Jose Earthquakes

=== Other information ===
Owner	(United States) Earthquakes Soccer, LLC
Ground (capacity and dimensions)	Buck Shaw Stadium (10,300 / 74x115 yards)

Source: San Jose Earthquakes

== Transfers ==
=== In ===
Date	Position	Nationality	Name	From	Fee	Ref.
January 13, 2011	FW	(United States)	Steven Lenhart	Columbus Crew	Trade for 1st round 2011 SuperDraft pick	
January 26, 2011	GK	(United States)	David Bingham	California Golden Bears	Weighted lottery	
January 28, 2011	MF	(United States)	Tony Donatelli	Montreal Impact	Undisclosed	
March 1, 2011	MF	(United States)	Anthony Ampaipitakwong	Akron Zips	2011 SuperDraft, 2nd round	
March 7, 2011	GK	(United States)	Andrew Weber		Free	
March 17, 2011	FW	(United States)	Ellis McLoughlin	Hertha BSC	Undisclosed	
March 25, 2011	FW	(United States)	Matt Luzunaris	Rapid Wien	Undisclosed	
July 8, 2011	MF	(Mexico)	Rafael Baca	Loyola Marymount Lions	Free	
July 14, 2011	DF	(Canada)	Nana Attakora	Toronto	Trade	
July 14, 2011	MF	(United States)	Jacob Peterson	Toronto	Trade	
July 14, 2011	FW	(United States)	Alan Gordon	Toronto	Trade	
November 30, 2011	MF	(United States)	Shea Salinas	(Canada) Vancouver Whitecaps FC	Acquired in exchange for allocation money	
December 1, 2011	MF	(Haiti)	Jean Alexandre	(United States) Real Salt Lake	Acquired in exchange for first round pick in 2012 MLS Supplemental Draft	
December 16, 2011	MF	(Honduras)	Marvin Chávez	(United States) FC Dallas	Acquired in exchange for allocation money	

=== Out ===
Date	Position	Nationality	Name	To	Fee	Ref.
June 27, 2011	MF	(United States)	Brandon McDonald	D.C. United	Trade	
July 14, 2011	FW	(Jamaica)	Ryan Johnson	Toronto	Trade	
November 23, 2011	DF	(United States)	Bobby Burling	Montreal Impact	Expansion Draft	
December 2, 2011	MF	(United States)	Bobby Convey	Sporting Kansas City	Trade	
December 5, 2011	FW	(United States)	Matt Luzunaris	Orlando City	Free	
December 12, 2011	DF	(United States)	Chris Leitch	LA Galaxy	Re-Entry Draft	

=== Loans in ===
Date from	Position	Nationality	Name	From	Date to	Ref.
March 16, 2011	MF	(England)	Simon Dawkins	Tottenham Hotspur		
August 15, 2011	FW	(Ecuador)	Edmundo Zura	El Nacional	August 31, 2011	
September 15, 2011	FW	(United States)	Maxwell Griffin	Orlando City	End of season	

=== Loans out ===
Date from	Position	Nationality	Name	To	Date to	Ref.
July 14, 2011	DF	(United States)	Justin Morrow	Tampa Bay	July 25, 2011	
July 15, 2011	FW	(United States)	Matt Luzunaris	Orlando City	End of season	

=== Released ===
Date	Position	Nationality	Name	Joined	Date
March 1, 2011	MF	(United States)	Tony Donatelli	Rochester Rhinos	March 18, 2011
March 1, 2011	GK	(United States)	Brian Edwards	Degerfors	
July 19, 2011	MF	(The Gambia)	Omar Jasseh		

== Friendlies ==
February 7, 2011	Chivas USA	1–0	San Jose Earthquakes	Carson
	Gordon 55'	Report	Ring (yellow card) 13'	Stadium: Home Depot Center

February 10, 2011	Los Angeles Galaxy	1–1	San Jose Earthquakes	Carson
	Magee 83'	Report	Opara 4'	Stadium: Home Depot Center

February 11, 2011	Ventura County Fusion	1–2	San Jose Earthquakes	Oxnard
	57'	Report	Donatelli 6', 28'

February 15, 2011	San Jose Earthquakes	4–0	California Golden Bears	San Jose
	Wondolowski 40', 50', 67', 83'	Report		Stadium: Nutrilite Training Facility

February 21, 2011	Birmingham City F.C. Reserves	0–4	San Jose Earthquakes	Birmingham, England
		Report	Wondolowski 38'; Lenhart 43', 85'; Gjertsen 45+1'	Stadium: Birmingham City Training Grounds

February 23, 2011	Colchester United F.C. Reserves	0–3	San Jose Earthquakes	Chigwell, England
		Report	McLoughlin 25', 55'; Luzunaris 60'	Stadium: Spurs Lodge

February 24, 2011	Leicester City F.C. Reserves	3–1	San Jose Earthquakes	Leicester, England
	Chamberlain 8'; Hicks 18'; Uchechi 60' (pen.)	Report	Wondolowski 53'	Stadium: Belvoir Drive

March 4, 2011	San Jose Earthquakes	1–0	Colorado Rapids	San Luis Obispo
19:00 PDT (UTC−7)	Wondolowski 30' (pen.)	Report		Stadium: Alex G. Spanos Stadium; Attendance: 2,689

March 5, 2011	Cal Poly Mustangs	0–1	San Jose Earthquakes	San Luis Obispo
		Report	Luzunaris	Stadium: Alex G. Spanos Stadium

March 12, 2011	San Jose Earthquakes	1–1	Portland Timbers	Santa Clara
13:00 PDT (UTC−7)	Wondolowski 69' (pen.)	Report	Brunner 52'	Stadium: Buck Shaw Stadium

July 12, 2011	San Jose Earthquakes	2–1	West Bromwich Albion	Santa Clara
19:30 PDT (UTC−7)	Bingham 3'; Cronin (yellow card) 13'; Stephenson 45'	Report	Thomas 53'; Brunt (yellow card) 60'	Stadium: Buck Shaw Stadium; Attendance: 6,872; Referee: Alejandro Mariscal

== Competitions ==
=== Major League Soccer ===
==== Regular season ====
===== League table =====
====== Conference ======
Pos	Team	Pld	W	L	T	GF	GA	GD	Pts	Qualification
1	LA Galaxy	34	19	5	10	48	28	+20	67	Qualification for the conference semifinals
2	Seattle Sounders FC	34	18	7	9	56	37	+19	63	Qualification for the conference semifinals
3	Real Salt Lake	34	15	11	8	44	36	+8	53	Qualification for the conference semifinals
4	FC Dallas	34	15	12	7	42	39	+3	52	Qualification for the play-in round
5	Colorado Rapids	34	12	9	13	46	42	+4	49	Qualification for the play-in round
6	Portland Timbers	34	11	14	9	40	48	−8	42	
7	San Jose Earthquakes	34	8	12	14	40	45	−5	38	
8	Chivas USA	34	8	14	12	41	43	−2	36	
9	Vancouver Whitecaps FC	34	6	18	10	35	55	−20	28	

Source: MLS

====== Overall ======
Pos	Team	Pld	W	L	T	GF	GA	GD	Pts	
1	LA Galaxy (S, C)	34	19	5	10	48	28	+20	67	Qualification for the 2012–13 CONCACAF Champions League group stage
2	Seattle Sounders FC (U)	34	18	7	9	56	37	+19	63	Qualification for the 2012–13 CONCACAF Champions League group stage
3	Real Salt Lake	34	15	11	8	44	36	+8	53	Qualification for the 2012–13 CONCACAF Champions League group stage
4	FC Dallas	34	15	12	7	42	39	+3	52	
5	Sporting Kansas City	34	13	9	12	50	40	+10	51	
6	Houston Dynamo	34	12	9	13	45	41	+4	49	Qualification for the 2012–13 CONCACAF Champions League group stage
7	Colorado Rapids	34	12	9	13	44	41	+3	49	
8	Philadelphia Union	34	11	8	15	44	36	+8	48	
9	Columbus Crew	34	13	13	8	43	44	−1	47	
10	New York Red Bulls	34	10	8	16	50	44	+6	46	
11	Chicago Fire	34	9	9	16	46	45	+1	43	
12	Portland Timbers	34	11	14	9	40	48	−8	42	
13	D.C. United	34	9	13	12	49	52	−3	39	
14	San Jose Earthquakes	34	8	12	14	40	45	−5	38	
15	Chivas USA	34	8	14	12	41	43	−2	36	
16	Toronto FC (V)	34	6	13	15	36	59	−23	33	Qualification for the 2011–12 CONCACAF Champions League preliminary round
17	New England Revolution	34	5	16	13	38	58	−20	28	
18	Vancouver Whitecaps FC	34	6	18	10	35	55	−20	28	

Source: MLS
Rules for classification: 1) points; 2) head-to-head record; 3) goal difference; 4) number of goals scored
(C) MLS Cup champions; (S) Supporters' Shield winners; (U) U.S. Open Cup winners; (V) Canadian Championship winners

===== Results summary =====
Overall								Home						Away					
Pld	Pts	W	L	T	GF	GA	GD	W	L	T	GF	GA	GD	W	L	T	GF	GA	GD
0	0	0	0	0	0	0	0	0	0	0	0	0	0	0	0	0	0	0	0

Last updated: October 24, 2010
Source: Results
Pld = Matches played; Pts = Points; W = Matches won; T = Matches tied; L = Matches lost; GF = Goals for; GA = Goals against; GD = Goal difference

===== Results by matchday =====
Round	1	2	3	4	5	6	7	8	9	10	11	12	13	14	15	16	17	18	19	20	21	22	23	24	25	26	27	28	29	30
Stadium																														
Result																														
Position																														

Source: Results and League table
A = Away; H = Home; W = Win; L = Loss; T = Tie

===== Results =====
March 19, 2011 1	San Jose Earthquakes	0–1	Real Salt Lake	Santa Clara
19:30 PDT (UTC−7)	Cronin (yellow card) 6'; Leitch (yellow card) 37'; Stephenson (yellow card) 46'	Report	Espíndola (yellow card) 60'; Beckerman 63'	Stadium: Buck Shaw Stadium; Attendance: 10,525; Referee: Baldomero Toledo

March 26, 2011 2	Dallas	0–2	San Jose Earthquakes	Frisco
18:00 PDT (UTC−7)		Report	Wondolowski 5', 23'	Stadium: Pizza Hut Park; Attendance: 11,022; Referee: Ricardo Salazar

April 2, 2011 3	San Jose Earthquakes	2–2	Seattle Sounders FC	Santa Clara
19:30 PDT (UTC−7)	Leitch (yellow card) 6'; Dawkins 32'; Stephenson 52'	Report	Evans 18'; White 42'; Jaqua (yellow card) 71'; González (yellow card) 80'	Stadium: Buck Shaw Stadium; Attendance: 10,276; Referee: Edvin Jurisevic

April 9, 2011 4	San Jose Earthquakes	1–1	Toronto	Santa Clara
19:30 PDT (UTC−7)	Cronin (yellow card) 36'; Dawkins 38'; Opara (yellow card) 55'; Corrales (yellow card) 84'; Wondolowski (yellow card) 87'	Report	Gordon 27'; Tchani (yellow card) 35'; Attakora (yellow card) 41' de Guzman (yellow card) 79'; Peterson (yellow card) 90+3'	Stadium: Buck Shaw Stadium; Attendance: 8,928; Referee: Ramón Hernández

April 16, 2011 5	New York Red Bulls	3–0	San Jose Earthquakes	Harrison
16:30 PDT (UTC−7)	Rodgers 2', 15' (yellow card) 55'; De Rosario (yellow card) 32'; Henry 87'	Report	McDonald (yellow card) 55'	Stadium: Red Bull Arena; Attendance: 14,308; Referee: Chris Penso

April 23, 2011 6	San Jose Earthquakes	1–2	Chivas USA	Santa Clara
13:00 PDT (UTC−7)	Wondolowski 16'; Cronin (yellow card) 20'	Report	Moreno 45+1'; Trujillo 85'	Stadium: Buck Shaw Stadium; Attendance: 10,525; Referee: Jair Marrufo

April 30, 2011 7	Philadelphia Union	1–0	San Jose Earthquakes	Chester
13:00 PDT (UTC−7)	Okugo (yellow card) 27'; Mondragón (yellow card) 31'; Harvey (red card) 41'; Le Toux 76' (pen.)	Report	McDonald (yellow card) 32'; Convey (yellow card) 60'	Stadium: PPL Park; Attendance: 18,279; Referee: Mark Geiger

May 11, 2011 8	Vancouver Whitecaps FC	1–1	San Jose Earthquakes	Vancouver
19:00 PDT (UTC−7)	Dunfield (yellow card) 34'; Akloul (yellow card) 77'; Brovsky (yellow card) 86'; Nolly (yellow card) 86'; Chiumiento 90'	Report	Wondolowski 39'	Stadium: Empire Field; Attendance: 15,608; Referee: Ricardo Salazar

May 14, 2011 9	San Jose Earthquakes	3–0	Columbus Crew	Santa Clara
19:30 PDT (UTC−7)	Ring (yellow card) 24'; Wondolowski 50'; McDonald 59' (red card) 79'; Stephenson 62'; Hernandez (yellow card) 70'; Johnson (yellow card) 74'	Report	Heinemann (yellow card) 79'	Stadium: Buck Shaw Stadium; Attendance: 9,142; Referee: Jorge González

May 21, 2011 10	San Jose Earthquakes	2–1	New England Revolution	Santa Clara
19:30 PDT (UTC−7)	Convey (yellow card) 53' (goal) 83'; Lenhart (yellow card) 57'; McLoughlin 71'	Report	Tierney 86'	Stadium: Buck Shaw Stadium; Attendance: 9,736; Referee: Yader Reyes

May 28, 2011 11	Chicago Fire	2–2	San Jose Earthquakes	Bridgeview
17:30 PDT (UTC−7)	Oduro 57'; Gibbs 80' (yellow card) 81'	Report	Corrales 49'; Wondolowski 74'	Stadium: Toyota Park; Attendance: 11,926; Referee: Abiodun Okulaja

June 4, 2011 12	San Jose Earthquakes	2–0	Houston Dynamo	Santa Clara
19:30 PDT (UTC−7)	Lenhart 69'; Dawkins 90+1'	Report	Chabala (yellow card) 59'; Ashe (yellow card) 80'	Stadium: Buck Shaw Stadium; Attendance: 9,270; Referee: Alex Prus

June 11, 2011 13	D.C. United	2–4	San Jose Earthquakes	Washington, D.C.
16:37 PDT (UTC−7)	Najar 13'; Brettschneider 34'	Report	Lenhart 15', 22', 60'; Dawkins 49'; Ring (yellow card) 87'	Stadium: RFK Stadium; Attendance: 14,105; Referee: Andrew Chapin

June 17, 2011 14	Sporting Kansas City	1–0	San Jose Earthquakes	Kansas City
17:30 PDT (UTC−7)	Sapong 31'; Collin (yellow card) 52'; Sassano (yellow card) 54'	Report	Corrales (yellow card) 42'; Lenhart (yellow card) 50'	Stadium: Livestrong Sporting Park; Attendance: 18,467; Referee: Paul Ward

June 25, 2011 15	San Jose Earthquakes	0–0	LA Galaxy	Santa Clara
15:30 PDT (UTC−7)	Lenhart (yellow card) 43'; Corrales (yellow card) 49'	Report	Dunivant (yellow card) 37'; Saunders (red card) 43'	Stadium: Buck Shaw Stadium; Attendance: 10,872; Referee: Juan Guzman

July 2, 2011 16	San Jose Earthquakes	2–2	New York Red Bulls	Stanford
19:30 PDT (UTC−7)	Hernandez (yellow card) 32'; Stephenson 37'; Johnson (yellow card) 40'; Busch (yellow card) 64'; Lenhart 68'; Burling (yellow card) 80' (yellow-red card) 90+1'	Report	Lindpere 7', 85'; Miller (yellow card) 60'	Stadium: Stanford Stadium; Attendance: 41,028; Referee: Edvin Jurisevic

July 6, 2011 17	Chivas USA	2–0	San Jose Earthquakes	Carson
19:30 PDT (UTC−7)	Zemanski 64'; LaBrocca 84'	Report	Lenhart (yellow card) 60'	Stadium: Home Depot Center; Attendance: 9,425; Referee: Baldomero Toledo

July 9, 2011 18	San Jose Earthquakes	0–0	Philadelphia Union	Santa Clara
19:30 PDT (UTC−7)	Johnson (yellow card) 64'; Corrales (yellow card) 66'; Hernandez (yellow card) 89'	Report		Stadium: Buck Shaw Stadium; Attendance: 9,794; Referee: Elias Bazakos

July 16, 2011 19	Columbus Crew	0–0	San Jose Earthquakes	Columbus
16:30 PDT (UTC−7)		Report	Lenhart (yellow card) 16'; Ring (yellow card) 69'	Stadium: Mapfre Stadium; Attendance: 14,109; Referee: Jair Marrufo

July 20, 2011 20	San Jose Earthquakes	2–2	Vancouver Whitecaps FC	Santa Clara
19:30 PDT (UTC−7)	Wondolowski 3', 54'; Ring (yellow card) 45'; Leitch (yellow card) 74'; Corrales (yellow card) 93+'	Report	Brovsky (yellow card) 40'; Hassli 42', 61'	Stadium: Buck Shaw Stadium; Attendance: 8,122; Referee: Paul Ward

July 23, 2011 21	Real Salt Lake	4–0	San Jose Earthquakes	Sandy City
19:08 PDT (UTC−7)	Beckerman (yellow card) 13' (goal) 78'; Saborío 63' (pen.), 75'; Olave 83'	Report	Peterson (yellow card) 15'; Convey (yellow card) 32'; Ring (yellow card) 56'; Burling (red card) 60'	Stadium: Rio Tinto Stadium; Attendance: 19,429; Referee: David Gantar

July 30, 2011 22	San Jose Earthquakes	0–2	D.C. United	Santa Clara
19:30 PDT (UTC−7)	Gordon (yellow card) 37'	Report	De Rosario 57', 66'; Najar (red card) 70' da Luz (yellow card) 79'	Stadium: Buck Shaw Stadium; Attendance: 10,525; Referee: Mark Kadlecik

August 6, 2011 23	San Jose Earthquakes	1–1	Portland Timbers	Santa Clara
19:30 PDT (UTC−7)	Burling (yellow card) 14'; Gordon 67'; Convey (yellow card) 75'	Report	Cooper 23'; Palmer (yellow card) 51'; Hall (yellow card) 69' (yellow-red card) 90+1'	Stadium: Buck Shaw Stadium; Attendance: 10,525; Referee: Hilario Grajeda

August 13, 2011 24	San Jose Earthquakes	1–2	Colorado Rapids	Santa Clara
19:30 PDT (UTC−7)	Stephenson (yellow card) 15'; Gjertsen 22'; Wondolowski (yellow card) 36'; Cronin (red card) 50'	Report	Thompson (yellow card) 25'; Folan 39' (pen.) (yellow card) 81'; Larentowicz (yellow card) 55' (goal) 72'; Moor (yellow card) 79'	Stadium: Buck Shaw Stadium; Attendance: 10,525; Referee: Paul Ward

August 20, 2011 25	LA Galaxy	2–0	San Jose Earthquakes	Carson
19:30 PDT (UTC−7)	Keane 21'; Hejduk (yellow card) 68'; Magee 90'	Report	Baca (yellow card) 54'; Beitashour (red card) 81'	Stadium: Home Depot Center; Attendance: 27,000; Referee: Andrew Chapin

August 27, 2011 26	Toronto	1–1	San Jose Earthquakes	Toronto
16:00 PDT (UTC−7)	Avila 33'	Report	Burling (yellow card) 31'; Convey (yellow card) 37'; Wondolowski 87'	Stadium: BMO Field; Attendance: 21,117; Referee: Terry Vaughn

September 10, 2011 27	San Jose Earthquakes	2–0	Chicago Fire	Santa Clara
19:30 PDT (UTC−7)	Wondolowski 10'; Beitashour (yellow card) 19'; Corrales 69' (yellow card) 90'; Dawkins (yellow card) 85'; Cronin (yellow card) 90+2'	Report	Husidić (yellow card) 35'; Gargan (yellow card) 57'	Stadium: Buck Shaw Stadium; Attendance: 10,525; Referee: Geoff Gamble

September 17, 2011 28	Houston Dynamo	2–1	San Jose Earthquakes	Houston
17:30 PDT (UTC−7)	Davis (yellow card) 18' (goal) 48' (pen.); Moffat (yellow card) 61'; Bruin 80'	Report	Stephenson 40'; Attakora (yellow card) 64'	Stadium: Robertson Stadium; Attendance: 18,129; Referee: Silviu Petrescu

September 21, 2011 29	Portland Timbers	1–1	San Jose Earthquakes	Portland
19:30 PDT (UTC−7)	Cooper 9'; Jewsbury (yellow card) 80'; Perlaza (yellow card) 86'	Report	Cronin (yellow card) 52'; Stephenson 70'; Baca (yellow card) 90+2'	Stadium: Jeld-Wen Field; Attendance: 18,627; Referee: Michael Kennedy

September 24, 2011 30	Colorado Rapids	1–1	San Jose Earthquakes	Commerce City
18:00 PDT (UTC−7)	Moor (yellow card) 53' (goal) 71'; Folan (yellow card) 63'	Report	Wondolowski 19'; Dawkins (yellow card) 43'; Ring (yellow card) 52'; Beitashour (yellow card) 76'	Stadium: Dick's Sporting Goods Park; Attendance: 17,877; Referee: Jorge González

October 1, 2011 31	San Jose Earthquakes	1–1	Sporting Kansas City	Santa Clara
19:30 PDT (UTC−7)	Stephenson (yellow card) 28'; Wondolowski 85'	Report	Bravo (yellow card) 24'; Bunbury 86'	Stadium: Buck Shaw Stadium; Attendance: 10,525; Referee: Alex Prus

October 8, 2011 32	New England Revolution	1–2	San Jose Earthquakes	Foxborough
16:30 PDT (UTC−7)	Wondolowski 8', 82' (yellow card) 58'; Cronin (yellow card) 39'; Corrales (yellow card) 54'	Report	Feilhaber (yellow card) 34' (goal) 55'; Cochrane (yellow card) 55'	Stadium: Gillette Stadium; Attendance: 9,111; Referee: Silviu Petrescu

October 15, 2011 33	Seattle Sounders FC	2–1	San Jose Earthquakes	Seattle
19:30 PDT (UTC−7)	Ianni (yellow card) 48'; Ochoa 82'; Montero 87'	Report	Morrow (yellow card) 6'; Wondolowski 24'; Ring (yellow card) 40'; Hernandez (yellow card) 57'	Stadium: CenturyLink Field; Attendance: 64,140; Referee: Michael Kennedy

October 22, 2011 34	San Jose Earthquakes	4–2	Dallas	Santa Clara
19:30 PDT (UTC−7)	Dawkins 26', 38'; Baca 27'; Wondolowski 34' (pen.); Burling (yellow card) 77'	Report	John 45+1'; Luna 90'	Stadium: Buck Shaw Stadium; Attendance: 10,744; Referee: Kevin Stott

=== U.S. Open Cup ===
==== Qualification ====
May 3, 2011 Qualification Semifinal	Portland Timbers	0–1 (a.e.t.)	San Jose Earthquakes	Portland
19:30 PDT (UTC−7)	Pore (yellow card) 50'; Marcelin (yellow card) 117'	Report	Ring (yellow card) 7'; Corrales (yellow card) 62'; Cronin (yellow card) 80'; Johnson (yellow card) 90'; Lenhart (yellow card) 104'; Opara 120'	Stadium: Jeld-Wen Field; Attendance: 11,412; Referee: Alejandro Mariscal

May 24, 2011 Qualification Final	San Jose Earthquakes	2–2 (a.e.t.) (4–5 p)	Chicago Fire	Santa Clara
19:30 PDT (UTC−7)	McLoughlin 14'; Wondolowski (yellow card) 37'; Morrow 43'; Ring (yellow card) 69'; Stephenson (yellow card) 97'	Report	Cuesta (yellow card) 39' (goal) 76'; Barouch 61' (yellow card) 69'; Paladini (yellow card) 63'; Ristić (yellow card) 74'; Nazarit (yellow card) 89'; Segares (red card) 98'	Stadium: Buck Shaw Stadium; Attendance: 4,124; Referee: Daniel Radford
	Penalties
	(penalty scored) Wondolowski; (penalty missed) Cronin; (penalty scored) Corrales; (penalty scored) Stephenson; (penalty scored) McDonald; (penalty missed) Sealy		Pappa (penalty scored); Pause (penalty missed); Nazarit (penalty scored); Barouch (penalty scored); Oduro (penalty scored); Paladini (penalty scored)

== Squad statistics ==
As of match played October 22, 2011

=== Appearances and goals ===
No.	Pos	Nat	Player	Total		MLS		U.S. Open Cup	
No.	Pos	Nat	Player	Apps	Goals	Apps	Goals	Apps	Goals
1	GK	(United States) USA	David Bingham	1	0	1	0	0	0
2	DF	(United States) USA	Bobby Burling	25	0	23	0	2	0
3	DF	(United States) USA	Chris Leitch	14	0	12+2	0	0	0
4	MF	(United States) USA	Sam Cronin	29	0	22+5	0	2	0
5	MF	(United States) USA	Brad Ring	23	0	17+4	0	2	0
6	DF	(United States) USA	Ike Opara	9	1	5+3	0	1	1
7	MF	(Jamaica) JAM	Khari Stephenson	33	5	27+4	5	1+1	0
8	FW	(United States) USA	Chris Wondolowski	32	16	30	16	2	0
9	FW	(Trinidad and Tobago) TTO	Scott Sealy	12	0	6+5	0	0+1	0
10	MF	(England) ENG	Simon Dawkins	26	6	19+7	6	0	0
11	MF	(United States) USA	Bobby Convey	22	1	19+2	1	1	0
12	DF	(United States) USA	Ramiro Corrales	30	2	28	2	2	0
13	GK	(United States) USA	Andrew Weber	2	0	0	0	2	0
14	FW	(United States) USA	Maxwell Griffin	4	0	0+4	0	0	0
15	DF	(United States) USA	Justin Morrow	11	1	9	0	1+1	1
16	FW	(United States) USA	Alan Gordon	2	1	1+1	1	0	0
17	MF	(United States) USA	Joey Gjertsen	18	1	13+5	1	0	0
18	GK	(United States) USA	Jon Busch	33	0	33	0	0	0
19	FW	(United States) USA	Jacob Peterson	9	0	5+4	0	0	0
20	DF	(United States) USA	Tim Ward	3	0	2+1	0	0	0
21	DF	(United States) USA	Jason Hernandez	29	0	29	0	0	0
23	MF	(United States) USA	Anthony Ampaipitakwong	13	0	5+7	0	1	0
24	FW	(United States) USA	Steven Lenhart	16	5	13+1	5	0+2	0
25	FW	(United States) USA	Ellis McLoughlin	12	2	0+10	1	1+1	1
27	DF	(Canada) CAN	Nana Attakora	6	0	5+1	0	0	0
30	MF	(Mexico) MEX	Rafael Baca	15	1	11+4	1	0	0
32	FW	(United States) USA	Matt Luzunaris	6	0	0+6	0	0	0
33	DF	(United States) USA	Steven Beitashour	21	0	19	0	2	0
Players away from San Jose Earthquakes on loan:
Players who left San Jose Earthquakes during the season:
14	MF	(United States) USA	Brandon McDonald	12	1	8+3	1	1	0
14	FW	(Ecuador) ECU	Edmundo Zura	1	0	0+1	0	0	0
19	FW	(Jamaica) JAM	Ryan Johnson	15	0	12+2	0	1	0
22	MF	(The Gambia) GAM	Omar Jasseh	1	0	0+1	0	0	0

=== Goal scorers ===
Place	Position	Nation	Number	Name	MLS	U.S. Open Cup	Total
1	FW	(United States)	8	Chris Wondolowski	16	0	16
2	MF	(England)	10	Simon Dawkins	6	0	6
3	FW	(United States)	24	Steven Lenhart	5	0	5
3	MF	(Jamaica)	7	Khari Stephenson	5	0	5
5	DF	(United States)	12	Ramiro Corrales	2	0	2
5	FW	(United States)	25	Ellis McLoughlin	1	1	2
7	MF	(United States)	14	Brandon McDonald	1	0	1
7	MF	(United States)	11	Bobby Convey	1	0	1
7	FW	(United States)	16	Alan Gordon	1	0	1
7	MF	(United States)	17	Joey Gjertsen	1	0	1
7	MF	(Mexico)	30	Rafael Baca	1	0	1
7	DF	(United States)	6	Ike Opara	0	1	1
7	DF	(United States)	15	Justin Morrow	0	1	1
Total					40	3	43

=== Disciplinary record ===
Position	Nation	Number	Name	MLS		U.S. Open Cup		Total	
Position	Nation	Number	Name	Yellow card	Red card	Yellow card	Red card	Yellow card	Red card
2	(United States)	DF	Bobby Burling	5	2	0	0	5	2
3	(United States)	DF	Chris Leitch	3	0	0	0	3	0
4	(United States)	MF	Sam Cronin	6	1	1	0	7	1
5	(United States)	MF	Brad Ring	7	0	2	0	9	0
6	(United States)	DF	Ike Opara	1	0	0	0	1	0
7	(Jamaica)	MF	Khari Stephenson	3	0	1	0	4	0
8	(United States)	FW	Chris Wondolowski	3	0	1	0	4	0
10	(England)	MF	Simon Dawkins	2	0	0	0	2	0
11	(United States)	MF	Bobby Convey	5	0	0	0	5	0
12	(United States)	DF	Ramiro Corrales	7	0	1	0	8	0
14	(United States)	MF	Brandon McDonald	2	1	0	0	2	1
15	(United States)	DF	Justin Morrow	1	0	0	0	1	0
16	(United States)	FW	Alan Gordon	1	0	0	0	1	0
18	(United States)	GK	Jon Busch	1	0	0	0	1	0
19	(Jamaica)	FW	Ryan Johnson	3	0	1	0	4	0
19	(United States)	FW	Jacob Peterson	1	0	0	0	1	0
21	(United States)	DF	Jason Hernandez	4	0	0	0	4	0
24	(United States)	FW	Steven Lenhart	5	0	1	0	6	0
27	(Canada)	DF	Nana Attakora	1	0	0	0	1	0
30	(Mexico)	MF	Rafael Baca	2	0	0	0	2	0
33	(United States)	DF	Steven Beitashour	2	1	0	0	2	1
Total				65	5	8	0	73	5

== Miscellany ==
=== Allocation ranking ===
San Jose is in the #9 position in the MLS Allocation Ranking. The allocation ranking is the mechanism used to determine which MLS club has first priority to acquire a U.S. National Team player who signs with MLS after playing abroad, or a former MLS player who returns to the league after having gone to a club abroad for a transfer fee. A ranking can be traded, provided that part of the compensation received in return is another club's ranking.

=== International roster spots ===
San Jose has six international roster spots. Each club in Major League Soccer is allocated 8 international roster spots, which can be traded. On 14 July 2011, San Jose traded a slot to Toronto FC for use through the 2012 season, at which time the slot reverts to San Jose.

Previously, the club dealt one spot to Toronto FC on 14 July 2008 which was to remain with Toronto through the 2013 season then revert to San Jose. The club also dealt one spot to New York on 2 March 2009 but press reports did not indicate if or when this roster spots would revert to San Jose. One of these two traded slots did revert to San Jose prior to the 2011 season.

The club also acquired one spot from Houston on 14 August 2009 but that spot reverted to the Dynamo after the 2010 season.

There is no limit on the number of international slots on each club's roster. The remaining roster slots must belong to domestic players. For clubs based in the United States, a domestic player is either a U.S. citizen, a permanent resident (green card holder) or the holder of other special status (e.g., refugee or asylum status).

=== Future draft pick trades ===
Future picks acquired: 2012 SuperDraft Round 2 pick acquired from Colorado Rapids.
Future picks traded: None.

=== MLS rights to other players ===
San Jose maintains the MLS rights to Clarence Goodson after he declined a contract offer by the league and signed overseas with no transfer fee received. San Jose acquired Goodson's rights by drafting him in the 2007 MLS Expansion Draft.
