= 2012 San Jose Earthquakes season =

San Jose Earthquakes
2012 season
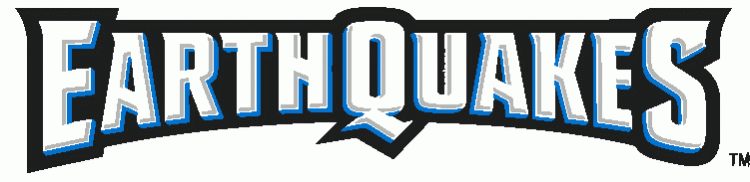
- Owner: Earthquakes Soccer, LLC
- Coach: Frank Yallop
- Stadium: Buck Shaw Stadium
- Major League Soccer: Conference: 1st Overall: 1st
- MLS Cup Playoffs: Conference Semifinals
- U.S. Open Cup: Quarterfinals
- California Clásico: 1st (2–0–1)
- Heritage Cup: 1st (2–0–0)
- Timbers Tournament: 1st (1–0–2)
- Top goalscorer: League: Chris Wondolowski (27); All: Chris Wondolowski (32)
- Highest home attendance: 50,391 v Los Angeles Galaxy (June 30, 2012)
- Lowest home attendance: 8,734 v D.C. United (May 2, 2012)
- Average home league attendance: 13,293
Home colors	Away colors	Third colors

The 2012 San Jose Earthquakes season was the club's 15th year of existence, as well as its 15th season in Major League Soccer and its fifth consecutive season in the top-flight of American soccer. Including all previous franchises, this is the 30th year with a soccer club in the San Jose area sporting the name "Earthquakes".

The Quakes finished first in the league table with 66 points (19W-6L-10D), the highest total in club history. The Supporters' Shield won as a result is the only trophy won by the reactivated Earthquakes franchise to date.

Chris Wondolowski cemented his reputation as a major scorer in the league during this season, matching Roy Lassiter's 27 goals originally set in 1996 during this season. Wondolowski won MLS MVP for his efforts. The club altogether amassed 72 goals, a team record.

The Quakes' MLS season ended with an upset loss to their heated rivals LA Galaxy in the playoffs, which they entered in the conference semifinals off a bye. They also fell in the quarterfinal of the U.S. Open Cup.

== Squad ==
As of September 14, 2012.

No.	Position	Nation	Player
1	GK	USA	David Bingham (GA)
2	MF	USA	Jacob Hustedt
4	MF	USA	Sam Cronin
5	MF	USA	Brad Ring
6	MF	USA	Shea Salinas
7	MF	JAM	Khari Stephenson
8	FW	USA	Chris Wondolowski (Vice-Captain)
9	FW	TUR	Sercan Güvenışık
10	FW	ENG	Simon Dawkins (on loan from Tottenham Hotspur)
11	MF	MAR	Mehdi Ballouchy
12	MF	USA	Ramiro Corrales (Captain)
13	GK	USA	Evan Newton
14	MF	HAI	Jean Alexandre
15	DF	USA	Justin Morrow
16	FW	USA	Alan Gordon
17	MF	USA	Joey Gjertsen
18	GK	USA	Jon Busch
19	FW	USA	Sam Garza (GA)
20	DF	USA	Tim Ward
21	DF	USA	Jason Hernandez
24	FW	USA	Steven Lenhart
26	DF	HON	Víctor Bernárdez
27	FW	PER	Cesar Diaz Pizarro
28	DF	USA	Jed Zayner
30	MF	MEX	Rafael Baca
33	DF	USA	Steven Beitashour
55	DF	USA	Ike Opara (GA)
81	MF	HON	Marvin Chávez
—	FW	USA	Marcus Tracy

=== Reserve ===
This list shows players who have played for the team in official 2011 MLS Reserve Division games, but are not part of the senior roster.

Note: Flags indicate national team as defined under FIFA eligibility rules; some limited exceptions apply. Players may hold more than one non-FIFA nationality.

No.	Pos.	Nation	Player
—	DF	USA	Yousef Samy
—	MF	USA	David Frank
—	MF	USA	Nick Lima
—	MF	PUR	Yuri Morales
—	MF	USA	Travis Pillon
—	FW	USA	James Callinan

=== Management ===
Position	Staff
General Manager	USA John Doyle
Head Coach	CAN Frank Yallop
Assistant Coach	USA Ian Russell
Assistant Coach	CAN Mark Watson
Goalkeeper Coach	NZL Jason Batty
Athletic Trainer	USA Bruce Morgan
Equipment Manager	SLV Jose Vega
Team Administrators	USA Dustin Cleaver, Sean Mearns
Team Doctor	USA Dr. Michael Oberlander

Last updated: November 21
Source: San Jose Earthquakes

=== Other information ===
Owner	Earthquakes Soccer, LLC
Ground (capacity and dimensions)	Buck Shaw Stadium (10,525 / 74x115 yards)

Source: San Jose Earthquakes

== Transfers ==
=== In ===
Date	Position	Nationality	Name	From	Fee	Ref.
January 26, 2012	FW	(Turkey)	Sercan Güvenışık	(Germany) SC Preußen Münster	Undisclosed	
February 2, 2012	MF	(Colombia)	Tressor Moreno	(Chile) Santiago Wanderers	Undisclosed	
June 20, 2012	DF	(United States)	Jed Zayner	Unnattached	Undisclosed	
July 30, 2012	DF	(Morocco)	Mehdi Ballouchy	New York Red Bulls	Acquired in exchange 2013 international roster slot and 2013 conditional draft pick	

=== Out ===
Date	Position	Nationality	Name	To	Fee	Ref.
June 4, 2012	MF	(United States)	Anthony Ampaipitakwong	(Thailand) Buriram United	Undisclosed	
July 9, 2012	MF	(Colombia)	Tressor Moreno	(Chile) Santiago Wanderers	Free Transfer	

=== Loans in ===
Date from	Position	Nationality	Name	From	Date to	Ref.
February 14, 2012	FW	(England)	Simon Dawkins	Tottenham Hotspur	Undisclosed	

=== Loans out ===
Date from	Position	Nationality	Name	To	Date to	Ref.
June 7, 2012	FW	(Haiti)	Jean-Marc Alexandre	(United States) Orlando City	10-day loan	
July 6, 2012	FW	(Haiti)	Jean-Marc Alexandre	(United States) Orlando City	3 day loan	
July 23, 2012	FW	(Haiti)	Jean-Marc Alexandre	(United States) Orlando City	Loan for remainder of season	

== Friendlies ==
February 1, 2012	FC Tucson	1–1	San Jose Earthquakes	Tucson, Arizona
10:00 AM PST	Dragic 75'	Report	Baca 38'	Stadium: Kino Sports Complex; Referee: (USA)

February 4, 2012	San Jose Earthquakes	1–2	Sporting Kansas City	Tucson, Arizona
10:00 AM PST	Wondolowski 3'	Report	Kamara 4'; Warzycha 80'	Stadium: Kino Sports Complex; Referee: (USA)

February 10, 2012	San Jose Earthquakes	2–1	Colorado Rapids	San Luis Obispo, California
6:00 PM PST	Stephenson 32'; Cronin (yellow card) 35'; Wondolowski 69'	Report	Castrillón 13'; Zapata (yellow card) 36'	Stadium: Alex G. Spanos Stadium; Attendance: 2,422; Referee: (USA)

February 14, 2012	San Jose Earthquakes	2–2	Houston Dynamo	Oxnard, California
10:00 AM PST	Wondolowski 30'; Ampaipitakwong 78'	Report	Kandji 5'; Bruin 51'	Stadium: Oxnard College; Referee: (USA)

February 18, 2012	San Jose Earthquakes	2–0	Chicago Fire	Oxnard, California
9:30 AM PST	Lenhart 3'; Ring 38'	Report		Stadium: Oxnard College; Referee: Kevin Stott

July 31, 2012 Friendly	San Jose Earthquakes	2–2	Swansea City A.F.C.	Santa Clara, California
7:00 PM PDT	Lenhart 80'; Lenhart 85'; Lenhart (yellow card) 90'	Report	Graham 41'; Chico Flores (yellow card) 52'; Chico 60'; Orlandi (yellow card) 89'	Stadium: Buck Shaw Stadium; Attendance: 9,239

September 6, 2012 Friendly	San Jose Earthquakes	1–0	San Luis F.C.	Santa Clara, California
7:30 PM PDT	Lenhart (yellow card) 32'; Stephenson (yellow card) 38'; Stewart (yellow card) 68'; Cronin (yellow card) 77'; Wondolowski 92'	Report	Velasco (yellow card) 30'; Villaluz (yellow card) 39'	Stadium: Buck Shaw Stadium; Attendance: 4,234

=== Timbers Tournament ===
February 27, 2012	Portland Timbers	1–1	San Jose Earthquakes	Portland, Oregon
7:30 PM PST	Alhassan 15'; Mosquera (yellow card) 70'	Report	Corrales (yellow card) 35'; Mosquera 59' (o.g.); Beitashour (yellow card) 71'	Stadium: Jeld-Wen Field; Attendance: 16,118; Referee: Drew Fisher

March 1, 2012	San Jose Earthquakes	0–0	AIK	Portland, Oregon
5:00 PM PST	Zayner (red card) 60'	Report	Backman (yellow card) 44'; Jobarteh (yellow card) 80'	Stadium: Jeld-Wen Field; Referee: (USA)

March 4, 2012	C.D. Chivas USA	0–5	San Jose Earthquakes	Portland, Oregon
2:30 PM PST	Pearce (yellow card) 11'	Report	Wondolowski 27'; Beitashour (yellow card) 31'; Morrow 52'; Chávez (yellow card) 58'; Moreno 80'; Güvenisik 84'; Garza 88'	Stadium: Jeld-Wen Field; Referee: (USA)

== Competitions ==
=== Major League Soccer ===
==== Regular season ====
===== League table =====
====== Conference ======
Pos	Team	Pld	W	L	T	GF	GA	GD	Pts	Qualification
1	San Jose Earthquakes	34	19	6	9	72	43	+29	66	MLS Cup Conference Semifinals
2	Real Salt Lake	34	17	11	6	46	35	+11	57	MLS Cup Conference Semifinals
3	Seattle Sounders FC	34	15	8	11	51	33	+18	56	MLS Cup Conference Semifinals
4	LA Galaxy	34	16	12	6	59	47	+12	54	MLS Cup Knockout Round
5	Vancouver Whitecaps FC	34	11	13	10	35	41	−6	43	MLS Cup Knockout Round
6	FC Dallas	34	9	13	12	42	47	−5	39	
7	Colorado Rapids	34	11	19	4	44	50	−6	37	
8	Portland Timbers	34	8	16	10	34	56	−22	34	
9	Chivas USA	34	7	18	9	24	58	−34	30	

Source: MLS

====== Overall ======
Pos	Team	Pld	W	L	T	GF	GA	GD	Pts	Qualification
1	San Jose Earthquakes (S)	34	19	6	9	72	43	+29	66	CONCACAF Champions League
2	Sporting Kansas City	34	18	7	9	42	27	+15	63	CONCACAF Champions League
3	D.C. United	34	17	10	7	53	43	+10	58	
4	New York Red Bulls	34	16	9	9	57	46	+11	57	
5	Real Salt Lake	34	17	11	6	46	35	+11	57	
6	Chicago Fire	34	17	11	6	46	41	+5	57	
7	Seattle Sounders FC	34	15	8	11	51	33	+18	56	
8	LA Galaxy (C)	34	16	12	6	59	47	+12	54	CONCACAF Champions League
9	Houston Dynamo	34	14	9	11	48	41	+7	53	CONCACAF Champions League
10	Columbus Crew	34	15	12	7	44	44	0	52	
11	Vancouver Whitecaps FC	34	11	13	10	35	41	−6	43	
12	Montreal Impact	34	12	16	6	45	51	−6	42	CONCACAF Champions League
13	FC Dallas	34	9	13	12	42	47	−5	39	
14	Colorado Rapids	34	11	19	4	44	50	−6	37	
15	Philadelphia Union	34	10	18	6	37	45	−8	36	
16	New England Revolution	34	9	17	8	39	44	−5	35	
17	Portland Timbers	34	8	16	10	34	56	−22	34	
18	Chivas USA	34	7	18	9	24	58	−34	30	
19	Toronto FC	34	5	21	8	36	62	−26	23	

Source: MLS
Rules for classification: 1) points; 2) head-to-head record; 3) goal difference; 4) number of goals scored
(C) MLS Cup Champion; (S) Supporters' Shield

===== Results by round =====
Overall								Home						Away					
Pld	Pts	W	L	T	GF	GA	GD	W	L	T	GF	GA	GD	W	L	T	GF	GA	GD
34	66	19	6	9	72	43	+29	10	1	6	43	22	+21	9	5	3	29	21	+8

Last updated: September 2, 2012
Source: MLSSoccer.com
Pld = Matches played; Pts = Points; W = Matches won; T = Matches tied; L = Matches lost; GF = Goals for; GA = Goals against; GD = Goal difference

Round	1	2	3	4	5	6	7	8	9	10	11	12	13	14	15	16	17	18	19	20	21	22	23	24	25	26	27	28	29	30	31	32	33	34
Stadium	H	H	A	A	H	A	H	A	H	A	H	H	A	A	A	A	H	A	A	H	H	A	H	H	A	H	H	A	H	A	H	A	H	A
Result	W	L	W	W	W	T	W	W	W	L	T	T	W	L	W	W	W	L	T	W	W	L	T	W	L	W	W	W	T	W	T	W	T	T

Updated to match(es) played on September 23, 2012. Source: MLS Results and League table
A = Away; H = Home; W = Win; L = Loss; T = Tie

===== Results =====
March 10, 2012 Round 1	San Jose Earthquakes	1–0	New England Revolution	Santa Clara, California
7:30 PM PST	Wondolowski 16'; Baca (yellow card) 20'; Lenhart (yellow card) 41'	Report	Lozano (yellow card) 59'	Stadium: Buck Shaw Stadium; Attendance: 10,525; Referee: Jorge González

March 17, 2012 Round 2	San Jose Earthquakes	0–1	Houston Dynamo	San Francisco, CA
2:00 PM PDT	Lenhart (yellow card) 50'	Report	Davis 14' (pen.); Taylor (yellow card) 53'; Cameron (yellow card) 63'; Hainault (yellow card) 83'	Stadium: AT&T Park; Attendance: 21,816; Referee: Chris Penso

March 24, 2012 Round 3	Toronto FC	0–3	San Jose Earthquakes	Toronto, ON
10:00 AM PDT		Report	Wondolowski 9'; Corrales (yellow card) 36'; Beitashour (yellow card) 51'; Salinas 56'; Wondolowski 67'	Stadium: BMO Field; Attendance: 20,070; Referee: Silviu Petrescu

March 31, 2012 Round 4	Seattle Sounders FC	0–1	San Jose Earthquakes	Seattle, WA
7:00 PM PDT	Alonso (yellow card) 6'; Sivebæk (yellow card) 47'; Scott (yellow card) 79'	Report	Wondolowski 24' (pen.); Baca (yellow card) 64'; Lenhart (yellow card) 64'; Gordon (yellow card) 81'	Stadium: CenturyLink Field; Attendance: 38,301; Referee: Mark Kadlecik

April 7, 2012 Round 5	San Jose Earthquakes	3–1	Vancouver Whitecaps FC	Santa Clara, California
4:00 PM PDT	Wondolowski 68'; Gordon 72'; Wondolowski 78'; Corrales (yellow card) 92'	Report	Davidson (yellow card) 11'; Bonjour (yellow card) 37'; Lee (yellow card) 47'; Le Toux 49'	Stadium: Buck Shaw Stadium; Attendance: 10,525; Referee: Ramón Hernández

April 14, 2012 Round 6	New York Red Bulls	2–2	San Jose Earthquakes	Harrison, New Jersey
4:00 PM PDT	Cooper 5'; McCarty 22'; Richards (yellow card) 47'; Márquez (yellow card) 86'	Report	Baca 15'; Salinas (yellow card) 25'; Wondolowski 35'; Chávez (yellow card) 52'	Stadium: Red Bull Arena; Attendance: 17,114; Referee: Ricardo Salazar

April 21, 2012 Round 7	San Jose Earthquakes	3–1	Real Salt Lake	Santa Clara, California
7:30 PM PDT	Moreno (yellow card) 22'; Dawkins (yellow card) 44'; Stephenson 47'; Lenhart (yellow card) 68'; Dawkins 92'; Wondolowski 93'	Report	Espíndola (red card) 29'; Beckerman (yellow card) 42'; Morales (yellow card) 47'; Beckerman 53'; Saborío (yellow card) 60'; Olave (red card) 69'	Stadium: Buck Shaw Stadium; Attendance: 10,202; Referee: Elias Bazakos

April 28, 2012 Round 8	Philadelphia Union	1–2	San Jose Earthquakes	Chester, Pennsylvania
4:00 PM PDT	Gómez 83'	Report	Lenhart 76'; Lenhart 93'	Stadium: PPL Park; Attendance: 18,581; Referee: Baldomero Toledo

May 2, 2012 Round 9	San Jose Earthquakes	5–3	D.C. United	Santa Clara, California
7:30 PM PDT	Lenhart 19'; Wondolowski 21'; Morrow 31'; Dawkins (yellow card) 59'; Wondolowski 69'; Lenhart 74'	Report	De Rosario 8'; Cruz (yellow card) 12'; Woolard 64'; Najar (yellow card) 78'; Salihi 88'	Stadium: Buck Shaw Stadium; Attendance: 8,734; Referee: Allen Chapman

May 5, 2012 Round 10	Vancouver Whitecaps FC	2–1	San Jose Earthquakes	Vancouver, BC
4:00 PM PDT	Koffie 40'; Davidson (yellow card) 92'; Hassli 94'	Report	Wondolowski 15'; Cronin (yellow card) 52'; Chávez (yellow card) 54'; Beitashour (yellow card) 54'	Stadium: BC Place; Attendance: 19,271; Referee: Chris Penso

May 13, 2012 Round 11	San Jose Earthquakes	1–1	C.D. Chivas USA	Santa Clara, California
4:00 PM PDT	Stephenson (yellow card) 39'; Corrales (yellow card) 56'; Gordon 88'; Garza (yellow card) 91'	Report	Correa 4'; LaBrocca (yellow card) 36'; Riley (yellow card) 74'	Stadium: Buck Shaw Stadium; Attendance: 9,619; Referee: Ricardo Salazar

May 19, 2012 Round 12	San Jose Earthquakes	1–1	Columbus Crew	Santa Clara, California
7:30 PM PDT	Lenhart (yellow card) 35'; Gordon (yellow card) 66'; Gordon 90'; Corrales (yellow card) 94'	Report	Meram 47'; Tchani (yellow card) 91'	Stadium: Buck Shaw Stadium; Attendance: 10,256; Referee: Juan Guzman

May 23, 2012 Round 13	Los Angeles Galaxy	2–3	San Jose Earthquakes	Carson, California
7:30 PM PDT	Jiménez 3'; Gaul (yellow card) 55'; Jiménez (red card) 59'; Magee 73'; Beckham (yellow card) 81'	Report	Lenhart (yellow card) 47'; Lenhart 76'; Stephenson 82' (pen.); Gordon 94'; Gordon (yellow card) 95'	Stadium: The Home Depot Center; Attendance: 16,512; Referee: Jair Marrufo

May 27, 2012 Round 14	Sporting Kansas City	2–1	San Jose Earthquakes	Kansas City, Kansas
1:30 PM PDT	Sapong 5'; Espinoza (yellow card) 29'; Kamara 39'; Olum (yellow card) 79'; Nielson (yellow card) 90'	Report	Gordon (yellow card) 45'; Hernandez (yellow card) 61'; Dawkins 72'	Stadium: Livestrong Sporting Park; Attendance: 19,974; Referee: Baldomero Toledo

June 20, 2012 Round 15	Colorado Rapids	1–2	San Jose Earthquakes	Commerce City, Colorado
6:30 PM PDT	Mullan 18'; Zapata (yellow card) 54'; Moor (yellow card) 91'	Report	Chávez (yellow card) 28'; Beitashour (yellow card) 31'; Bernárdez (yellow card) 47'; Freeman 83' (o.g.); Wondolowski 92' (pen.)	Stadium: Dick's Sporting Goods Park; Attendance: 13,080; Referee: Sorin Stoica

June 23, 2012 Round 16	Real Salt Lake	1–2	San Jose Earthquakes	Sandy, Utah
6:00 PM PDT	Beckerman (yellow card) 46'; Morales 79'; Espíndola (yellow card) 90'	Report	Stephenson (yellow card) 41'; Gordon 75'; Wondolowski 84'	Stadium: Rio Tinto Stadium; Attendance: 18,050; Referee: Jair Marrufo

June 30, 2012 Round 17	San Jose Earthquakes	4–3	Los Angeles Galaxy	Stanford, California
7:00 PM PDT	Lenhart 7'; Corrales (yellow card) 27'; Bernárdez 44'; Cronin 47'; Lenhart (yellow card) 47'; Bernárdez (yellow card) 51'; Wondolowski 61'	Report	Juninho (yellow card) 24'; Beckham 31'; Hernandez 36' (o.g.); Donovan 41'; Lopes (yellow card) 86'; Beckham (yellow card) 93'	Stadium: Stanford Stadium; Attendance: 50,391; Referee: Hilario Grajeda

July 3, 2012 Round 18	Portland Timbers	2–1	San Jose Earthquakes	Portland, Oregon
7:30 PM PDT	Mwanga 29'; Jewsbury 59'; Zizzo (yellow card) 79'	Report	Gordon 74'; Wondolowski (yellow card) 77'	Stadium: Jeld-Wen Field; Attendance: 20,438; Referee: Fotis Bazakos

July 7, 2012 Round 19	FC Dallas	0–0	San Jose Earthquakes	Frisco, Texas
6:00 PM PDT		Report	Baca (yellow card) 21'; Corrales (yellow card) 77'; Corrales (yellow card) 80' (red card)	Stadium: FC Dallas Stadium; Attendance: 10,132; Referee: Ismail Elfath

July 14, 2012 Round 20	San Jose Earthquakes	5–0	Real Salt Lake	Santa Clara, California
7:30 PM PDT	Wondolowski 18'; Chávez (yellow card) 26'; Morrow (yellow card) 59'; Gordon 63'; Wondolowski 72'; Dawkins 79'; Wondolowski 80'	Report	Watson-Siriboe (yellow card) 16'; Olave (yellow card) 44'; Beckerman (red card) 57'; Espíndola (yellow card) 59'; Mansally (yellow card) 62'; Steele (yellow card) 68'	Stadium: Buck Shaw Stadium; Attendance: 10,744; Referee: Allen Chapman

July 18, 2012 Round 21	San Jose Earthquakes	2–1	FC Dallas	Santa Clara, California
7:30 PM PDT	Chávez 12'; Gordon (yellow card) 36'; Gordon 45'; Bernárdez (yellow card) 74'; Beitashour (yellow card) 81'	Report	Loyd (yellow card) 13'; Castillo (yellow card) 81'; Pertúz 89'	Stadium: Buck Shaw Stadium; Attendance: 9,481; Referee: Kevin Stott

July 22, 2012 Round 22	Vancouver Whitecaps FC	2–1	San Jose Earthquakes	Vancouver, BC
4:00 PM PDT	Bonjour (yellow card) 11'; Robson (yellow card) 12'; Richards 20'; Robson 62' (pen.)	Report	Beitashour (yellow card) 32'; Gordon 38'	Stadium: BC Place; Attendance: 20,112; Referee: Jair Marrufo

July 28, 2012 Round 23	San Jose Earthquakes	1–1	Chicago Fire	Santa Clara, California
7:30 PM PDT	Gordon (yellow card) 54'; Wondolowski (yellow card) 93'; Gordon (yellow card) 93' (red card); Lenhart 98'	Report	Rolfe 37'; Gargan (yellow card) 70'	Stadium: Buck Shaw Stadium; Attendance: 10,525; Referee: Chris Penso

August 11, 2012 Round 24	San Jose Earthquakes	2–1	Seattle Sounders FC	Santa Clara, California
7:30 PM PDT	Bernárdez (yellow card) 15'; Morrow (yellow card) 47'; Dawkins 71'; Lenhart 93'	Report	Johansson (yellow card) 82'; Montero 92'	Stadium: Buck Shaw Stadium; Attendance: 10,744; Referee: Baldomero Toledo

August 18, 2012 Round 25	Montreal Impact	3–1	San Jose Earthquakes	Montreal, QC
4:30 PM PDT	Camara (red card) 21'; Di Vaio 25'; Neagle 61'; Bernier 72' (pen.)	Report	Lenhart (red card) 21'; Wondolowski 23' (pen.); Beitashour (yellow card) 54'; Hernandez (red card) 71'	Stadium: Saputo Stadium; Attendance: 19,431; Referee: Armando Villarreal

August 25, 2012 Round 26	San Jose Earthquakes	4–1	Colorado Rapids	Santa Clara, California
7:30 PM PDT	Dawkins 11'; Gordon 43'; Dawkins 68'; Gordon 75'	Report	Marshall 54'; Casey (yellow card) 55'	Stadium: Buck Shaw Stadium; Attendance: 10,525; Referee: Silviu Petrescu

September 2, 2012 Round 27	San Jose Earthquakes	4–0	C.D. Chivas USA	Santa Clara, California
6:00 PM PDT	Bernárdez 11'; Baca (yellow card) 31'; Dawkins 39'; Gordon (yellow card) 48'; Wondolowski (yellow card) 70'; Corrales 71'; Corrales 81'	Report	Minda (yellow card) 48'	Stadium: Buck Shaw Stadium; Attendance: 10,525; Referee: Mark Geiger

September 15, 2012 Round 28	C.D. Chivas USA	0–2	San Jose Earthquakes	Carson, California
7:30 PM PDT	Valencia (yellow card) 39'; Joseph (yellow card) 39'; Villafaña (yellow card) 69'	Report	Wondolowski 40' (pen.); Gordon 49'	Stadium: The Home Depot Center; Attendance: 11,317; Referee: Chris Penso

September 19, 2012 Round 29	San Jose Earthquakes	2–2	Portland Timbers	Santa Clara, California
7:30 PM PDT	Corrales (yellow card) 38'; Cronin (yellow card) 68'; Wondolowski 73'; Wondolowski 92'	Report	Mwanga 45'; Smith (yellow card) 54'; Mwanga 62'; Songo'o (yellow card) 71'	Stadium: Buck Shaw Stadium; Attendance: 9,877; Referee: Armando Villarreal

September 23, 2012 Round 30	Seattle Sounders FC	1–2	San Jose Earthquakes	Seattle, WA
7:30 PM PDT	Zakuani 14'; Tiffert (yellow card) 79'; Alonso (yellow card) 90'	Report	Dawkins 2'; Wondolowski 30'; Bernárdez (yellow card) 52'	Stadium: CenturyLink Field; Attendance: 38,948; Referee: Hilario Grajeda

September 29, 2012 Round 31	San Jose Earthquakes	3–3	FC Dallas	Santa Clara, California
7:30 PM PDT	Bernárdez (yellow card) 17'; Gordon 24'; Lenhart 82'; Cronin (yellow card) 87'; Lenhart 95'	Report	Pérez 37'; Jacobson (yellow card) 59'; Jackson (yellow card) 61'; Pérez 72'; Ferreira (yellow card) 87'; Hedges 88'	Stadium: Buck Shaw Stadium; Attendance: 10,744; Referee: Geoff Gamble

October 6, 2012 Round 32	Colorado Rapids	1–4	San Jose Earthquakes	Commerce City, Colorado
6:00 PM PDT	Freeman (yellow card) 32'; Hill (yellow card) 80'; Akpan 92' (pen.)	Report	Chávez 2'; Wondolowski 11'; Chávez (yellow card) 32'; Wondolowski 51'; Wondolowski 83'; Hernandez (red card) 91'	Stadium: Dick's Sporting Goods Park; Attendance: 15,232; Referee: Jose Carlos Rivero

October 21, 2012 Round 33	San Jose Earthquakes	2–2	Los Angeles Galaxy	Santa Clara, California
4:00 PM PDT	Chávez 61'; Wondolowski 73'	Report	Keane 59'; Buddle 69'; Juninho (yellow card) 70'	Stadium: Buck Shaw Stadium; Attendance: 10,744; Referee: Jair Marrufo

October 27, 2012 Round 34	Portland Timbers	1–1	San Jose Earthquakes	Portland, Oregon
3:30 PM PDT	Dike 67'	Report	Wondolowski 24' (pen.)	Stadium: Jeld-Wen Field; Attendance: 20,438; Referee: Mark Geiger

==== MLS Cup Playoffs ====
November 4, 2012 Conference Semifinal	Los Angeles Galaxy	0–1	San Jose Earthquakes	Carson, California
6:00 PM PST		Report	Chávez (yellow card) 17'; Bernárdez 94'	Stadium: The Home Depot Center; Attendance: 27,000; Referee: Ricardo Salazar

November 7, 2012 Conference Semifinal	San Jose Earthquakes	1–3 (2–3 agg.)	Los Angeles Galaxy	Santa Clara, California
8:00 PM PST	Bernárdez (yellow card) 4'; Lenhart (yellow card) 42'; Gordon 82'	Report	Beckham (yellow card) 17'; Keane 21'; Keane 34'; Magee 39'; Gonzalez (yellow card) 41'	Stadium: Buck Shaw Stadium; Attendance: 10,744; Referee: Kevin Stott

=== U.S. Open Cup ===
May 29, 2012 Third round	San Jose Earthquakes	2–1	Fort Lauderdale Strikers	Stanford, California
7:30 PM PDT	Morrow (yellow card) 50'; Garza 63'; Garza (yellow card) 66'; Garza 70'	Report	Anderson 38'; Lorenz (yellow card) 55'; Restrepo (yellow card) 89'	Stadium: Laird Q. Cagan Stadium; Attendance: 1,271; Referee: Yader Reyes

June 5, 2012 Fourth round	San Jose Earthquakes	1–0	Minnesota Stars FC	Stanford, California
8:00 PM PDT	Beitashour (yellow card) 45'; Corrales (yellow card) 55'; Lenhart 85'	Report	Altman (yellow card) 42'; Davis (yellow card) 60'; Kallman (yellow card) 93'	Stadium: Laird Q. Cagan Stadium; Attendance: 1,548; Referee: Alejandro Mariscal

June 26, 2012 Quarterfinal	San Jose Earthquakes	0–1	Seattle Sounders FC	San Francisco
7:30 PM PDT	Gordon (yellow card) 49'; Beitashour (yellow card) 68'; Morrow (yellow card) 75'; Gordon (red card) 85'	Report	Cato 19'; Scott (yellow card) 51'; Rose (yellow card) 82'	Stadium: Kezar Stadium; Attendance: 7,219; Referee: Yader Reyes

== Miscellany ==
=== Allocation ranking ===
San Jose is in the #6 position in the MLS Allocation Ranking. The allocation ranking is the mechanism used to determine which MLS club has first priority to acquire a U.S. National Team player who signs with MLS after playing abroad, or a former MLS player who returns to the league after having gone to a club abroad for a transfer fee. A ranking can be traded, provided that part of the compensation received in return is another club's ranking.

=== International roster slots ===
San Jose has 7 MLS International Roster Slots for use in the 2012 season. Each club in Major League Soccer is allocated 8 international roster spots. San Jose traded one slot to Toronto in July 2011 and acquired one slot from Sporting Kansas City in December 2011. Each of these trades expire on January 1, 2013. Also, San Jose had previously traded a slot to Toronto in July 2008 that returns on January 1, 2014.

=== Future draft pick trades ===
Future picks acquired: None.
Future picks traded: 2013 MLS SuperDraft conditional pick to New York Red Bulls.

=== MLS Rights to Other Players ===
San Jose maintains the MLS rights to Clarence Goodson after he declined a contract offer by the league and signed overseas with no transfer fee received. San Jose acquired Goodson's rights by drafting him in the 2007 MLS Expansion Draft.
