= Simon Dawkins =

Jamaican footballer (born 1987)

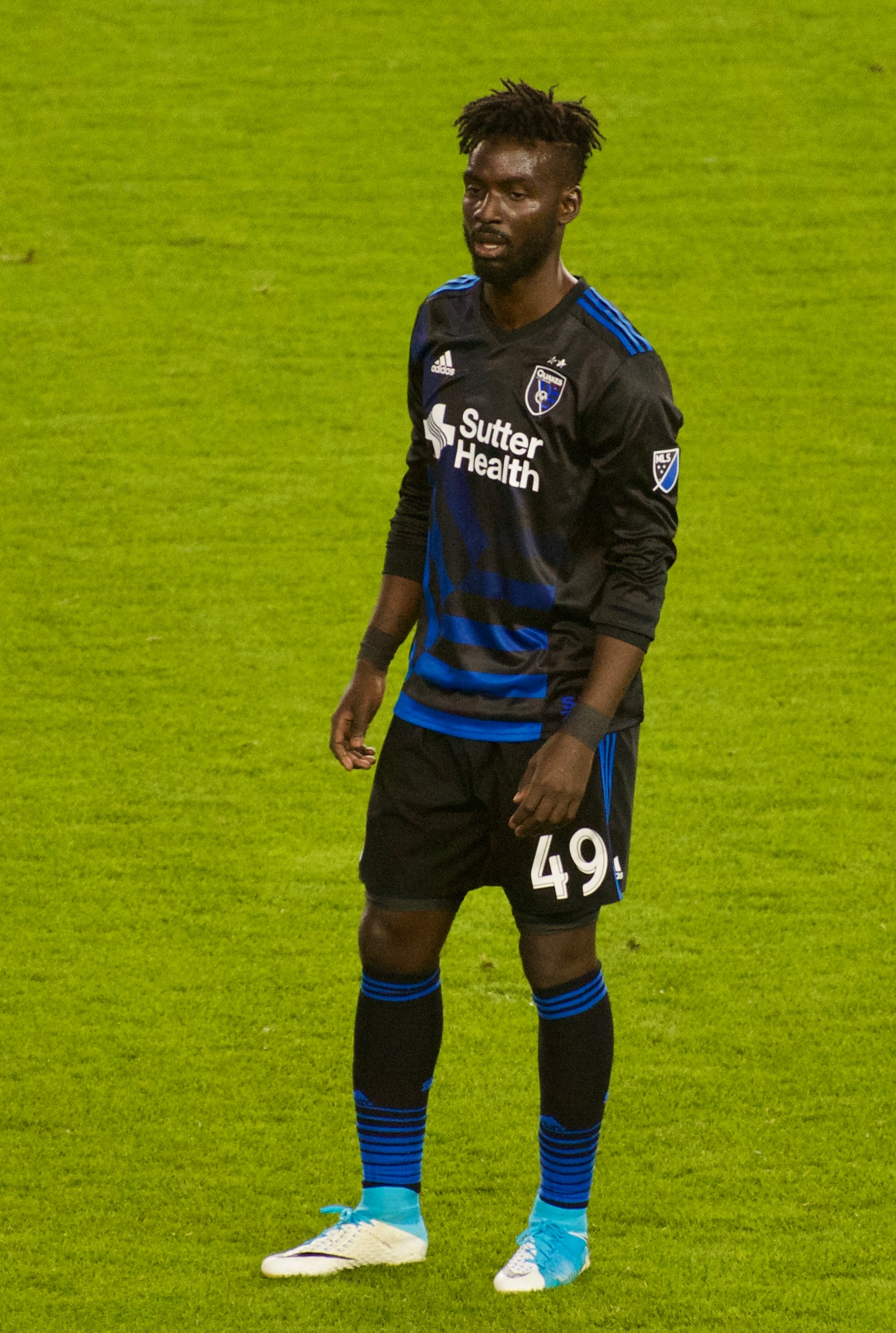
- Dawkins playing for the San Jose Earthquakes in 2017

Personal information
- Full name: Simon Jonathan Dawkins
- Date of birth: 1 December 1987 (age 38)
- Place of birth: Edgware, England
- Height: 5 ft 10 in (1.78 m)
- Positions: Attacking midfielder; winger

Youth career
- 2004–2005: Tottenham Hotspur

Senior career*
Years	Team	Apps	(Gls)
2005–2009	Tottenham Hotspur	0	(0)
2008–2009	→ Leyton Orient (loan)	11	(0)
2011–2014	Tottenham Hotspur	0	(0)
2011–2012	→ San Jose Earthquakes (loan)	53	(14)
2013	→ Aston Villa (loan)	4	(0)
2013–2014	→ Derby County (loan)	13	(3)
2014–2016	Derby County	47	(4)
2016–2018	San Jose Earthquakes	38	(5)
2019	Ipswich Town	2	(0)
2022–2023	Monterey Bay	39	(1)

International career
2002–2003	England U16	7	(1)
2003	England U17	2	(0)
2014–2016	Jamaica	21	(3)

Managerial career
- 2024: Monterey Bay FC 2
- 2024: Monterey Bay FC (interim)
Medal record
Men's football
Representing Jamaica
CONCACAF Gold Cup
Runner-up	2015 United States–Canada	Team
- * Club domestic league appearances and goals

Simon Jonathan Dawkins (born 1 December 1987) is a Jamaican retired professional footballer who played as an attacking midfielder or winger. Born in England, he represented the Jamaica national team. Recently, he was the interim head coach for Monterey Bay FC in the USL Championship during some of their 2024 season.

== Club career ==
=== Tottenham Hotspur ===
Dawkins joined the Tottenham Hotspur academy in 2004 and featured regularly in the reserves. He featured in the first team matchday squad once, as an unused sub under Martin Jol for a UEFA Cup game against Anorthosis Famagusta, but did not progress onto making a first-team appearance. On 1 June 2009, Dawkins was released from his Tottenham Hotspur contract and then failed a medical at RC Strasbourg.

==== Leyton Orient (loan) ====
He joined Leyton Orient on loan before the 2008–09 season started. His first team debut was delayed after picking up an ankle injury in a friendly match, coincidentally, against parent club Tottenham. He made his first league appearance on 16 August 2008, coming on as a substitute against Peterborough United, and made his cup debut in the Football League Trophy on 2 September where they beat Southend United 4–2. His loan period ended on 3 January 2009.

=== Return to Tottenham Hotspur ===
Dawkins later returned to Tottenham on a non-contract basis while recovering from injury. A contract depended upon his proven fitness at the start of the 2010–11 season.

In August 2010, Dawkins went on trial with Celtic later deciding to continue to train with Tottenham, scoring in a training friendly against Milton Keynes Dons on 8 December.

On 14 March 2011, Dawkins was rewarded with a contract by Tottenham Hotspur after impressing back at the club on trial, with his contract set to run until June 2013.

==== San Jose Earthquakes (loan) ====
Dawkins then signed for the San Jose Earthquakes on loan for the 2011 season. He made his debut for the Earthquakes on 19 March in their first game of the 2011 MLS season, a 1–0 loss to Real Salt Lake. He scored his first goal for his new club on 2 April in a 2–2 draw with Seattle Sounders FC.

In January 2012, after returning to Spurs, there was interest from Steve McClaren's FC Twente but a loan deal could not be finalised. Dawkins appeared in a Spurs matchday squad for the first time in over four years when he was an unused substitute for an FA Cup tie against Stevenage.

He then joined the Earthquakes on loan again for the 2012 season.

==== Aston Villa (loan) ====
On the final day of the January 2013 transfer window, Dawkins signed on loan with Premier League club Aston Villa for the remainder of the 2012–13 season. On 10 February 2013, at the age of 25, he made his Premier League debut in a match against West Ham United, which Villa won 2–1.

=== Derby County ===
On 14 October 2013, Dawkins joined Championship side Derby County. It was announced on 18 October 2013 that Dawkins would be extending his stay with the Rams by agreeing to a 93-day emergency loan. Dawkins made his first appearance for Derby on 19 October 2013, coming on as a replacement for Mason Bennett at the beginning of the second half. After a series of impressive performances for Derby, Head Coach Steve McClaren expressed his interest in signing Dawkins permanently in the January transfer window. A deal was reached with Tottenham and they agreed a fee on 3 January 2014, with Dawkins agreeing to a 2 1/2-year deal. He thus became manager Steve McClaren's first permanent signing for Derby.

=== San Jose Earthquakes ===
On 6 January 2016, Dawkins rejoined Major League Soccer side San Jose Earthquakes for an undisclosed fee.

On 16 February 2018, Dawkins and San Jose agreed to mutually terminate his contract with the club. Minnesota United FC claimed Dawkins on waivers shortly after the termination of his contract with San Jose. However, Dawkins was released a week later before the start of the season.

=== Ipswich Town ===
Following a trial in December 2018, Dawkins signed for Ipswich Town in January 2019 on a short-term deal, with the option of an additional 12 months. He was released at the end of the 2018–19 season after making just 2 substitute appearances for the club.

=== Monterey Bay ===
After a nearly three-year absence from club football, Dawkins was announced as a signing for USL Championship expansion side Monterey Bay FC on 15 March 2022. Dawkins had previously played under manager Frank Yallop during his initial loan spell with the San Jose Earthquakes, and assistant manager Ramiro Corrales was also his teammate at the time. On 23 July 2022, Dawkins scored his first goal for Monterey Bay during a 2–0 victory over New York Red Bulls II. In the summer of 2024, Dawkins became head coach of Monterey Bay FC 2 ahead of its second ever season. Monterey Bay FC 2 is the club's pre-professional second team which plays in USL League Two. Dawkins announced his retirement on 1 August 2024 and was named interim head coach for Monterey Bay's match against the Tampa Bay Rowdies.

== International career ==
Dawkins made seven appearances for the England under-16 side between 2002 and 2003, scoring once. He featured in the Victory Shield, Walkers International Tournament, and in the David Carins Memorial Trophy in County Antrim, Northern Ireland. He made two appearances for the England under-17 side in 2003, playing in the Pepsi International Tournament.

Dawkins made his international debut for Jamaica on 26 May 2014 against Serbia at the Red Bull Arena in New Jersey. He scored his first goal for Jamaica in a 2–2 draw with Egypt on 4 June 2014 at Leyton Orient. Dawkins scored a last-minute winner to see Jamaica through to the next round of qualifying stages with a spectacular volley against Nicaragua.

== Career statistics ==
=== Club ===
As of match played 19 March 2019

Appearances and goals by club, season and competition
Club	Season	League			National cup		League cup		Other		Total	
Club	Season	Division	Apps	Goals	Apps	Goals	Apps	Goals	Apps	Goals	Apps	Goals
Tottenham Hotspur	2008–09	Premier League	0	0	0	0	0	0	0	0	0	0
Tottenham Hotspur	2010–11	Premier League	0	0	0	0	0	0	0	0	0	0
Tottenham Hotspur	2011–12	Premier League	0	0	0	0	0	0	0	0	0	0
Tottenham Hotspur	2012–13	Premier League	0	0	0	0	0	0	0	0	0	0
Tottenham Hotspur	2013–14	Premier League	0	0	0	0	0	0	0	0	0	0
Tottenham Hotspur	Total		0	0	0	0	0	0	0	0	0	0
Leyton Orient (loan)	2008–09	League One	11	0	1	0	0	0	2 (Note: Appearances in Football League Trophy)	0	14	0
San Jose Earthquakes (loan)	2011	Major League Soccer	26	6	0	0	—		0	0	26	6
San Jose Earthquakes (loan)	2012	Major League Soccer	29	8	2	0	—		2 (Note: Appearances in MLS Cup Playoffs)	0	33	8
San Jose Earthquakes (loan)	Total		55	14	2	0	0	0	2	0	59	14
Aston Villa (loan)	2012–13	Premier League	4	0	0	0	0	0	—		4	0
Derby County (loan)	2013–14	Championship	13	3	0	0	0	0	—		13	3
Derby County	2013–14	Championship	13	1	1	0	0	0	3 (Note: Appearances in Football League play-offs)	0	17	1
Derby County	2014–15	Championship	34	3	3	0	5	2	—		42	5
Derby County	2015–16	Championship	0	0	0	0	1	0	—		1	0
Derby County	Total		60	7	4	0	6	2	3	0	73	9
San Jose Earthquakes	2016	Major League Soccer	24	5	0	0	—		0	0	24	5
San Jose Earthquakes	2017	Major League Soccer	14	0	2 (Note: Appearances in U.S. Open Cup)	0	—		0	0	16	0
San Jose Earthquakes	Total		38	5	2	0	0	0	0	0	40	5
Ipswich Town	2018–19	Championship	2	0	0	0	0	0	—		2	0
Career total			170	26	9	0	6	2	7	0	192	28

=== International ===
Appearances and goals by national team and year
National team	Year	Apps	Goals
Jamaica	2014	8	2
Jamaica	2015	11	1
Jamaica	2016	2	0
Total		21	3

Scores and results list Jamaica's goal tally first, score column indicates score after each Dawkins goal.

List of international goals scored by Simon Dawkins
No.	Date	Venue	Opponent	Score	Result	Competition
1	4 June 2014	Brisbane Road, London, England	Egypt	1–1	2–2	Friendly
2	16 November 2014	Montego Bay Sports Complex, Montego Bay, Jamaica	Haiti	1–0	2–0	2014 Caribbean Cup
3	8 September 2015	Dennis Martínez National Stadium, Managua, Nicaragua	Nicaragua	2–0	2–0	2018 FIFA World Cup qualification

== Honours ==
=== Club ===
San Jose Earthquakes

- Major League Soccer Supporters' Shield: 2012
- Major League Soccer Western Conference Regular Season Championship: 2012

=== International ===
Jamaica

- Caribbean Cup: 2014
- CONCACAF Gold Cup runner-up: 2015
