= Alan Gordon (soccer) =

American soccer player

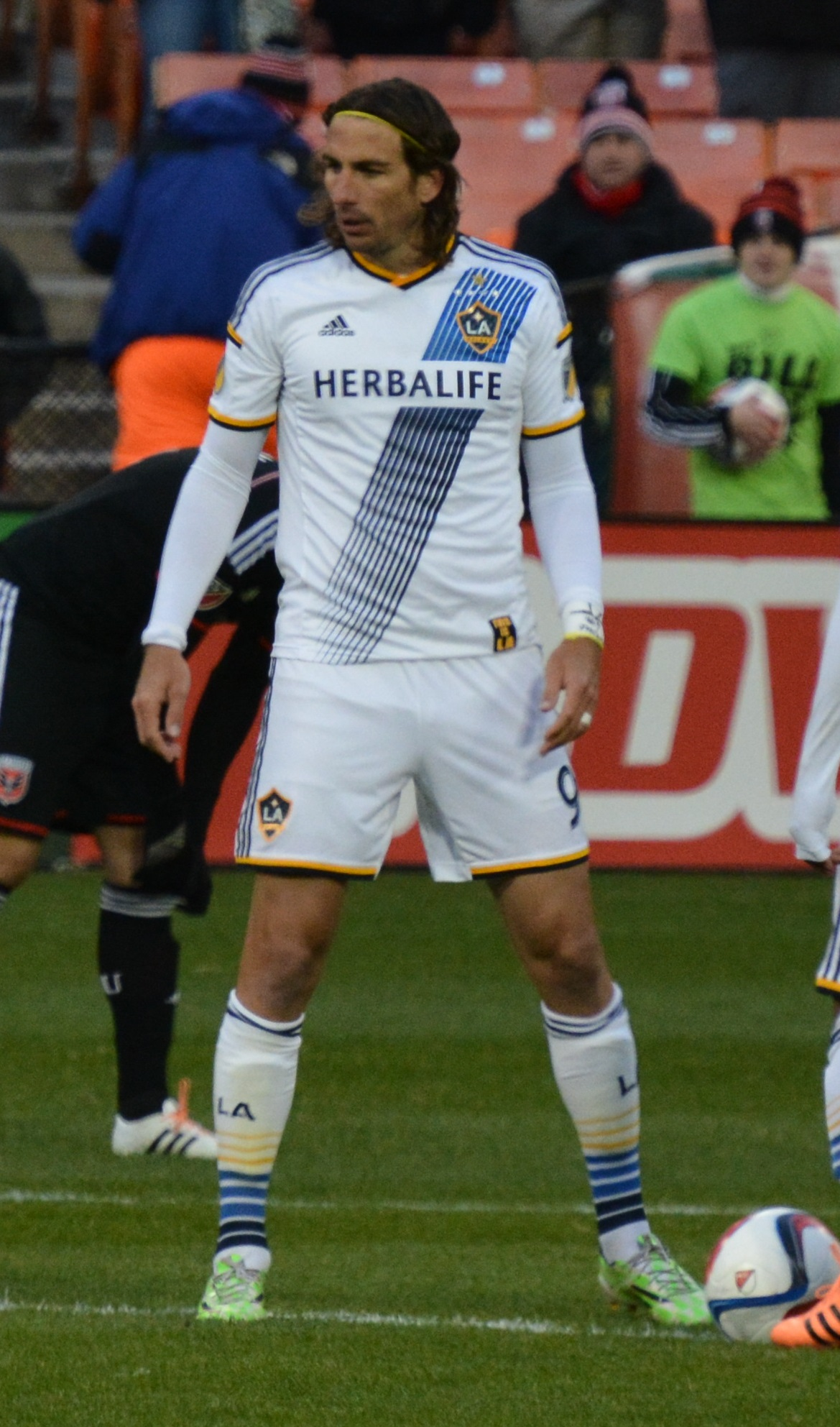
- Gordon playing for LA Galaxy March 2015

Personal information
- Full name: Alan Eugene Gordon II
- Date of birth: October 16, 1981 (age 45)
- Place of birth: Long Beach, California, United States
- Height: 6 ft 3 in (1.91 m)
- Position: Forward

College career
Years	Team	Apps	(Gls)
2000–2001	Yavapai Roughriders	50	(39)
2002–2003	Oregon State Beavers	40	(26)

Senior career*
Years	Team	Apps	(Gls)
2004	Portland Timbers	27	(17)
2004	→ LA Galaxy (loan)	3	(0)
2005–2010	LA Galaxy	96	(16)
2006	→ Portland Timbers (loan)	1	(0)
2010	Chivas USA	9	(1)
2011	Toronto FC	8	(4)
2011–2014	San Jose Earthquakes	64	(18)
2014–2016	LA Galaxy	65	(13)
2017	Colorado Rapids	26	(3)
2018	Chicago Fire	23	(4)
Total		322	(76)

International career^{‡}
2012–2015	United States	2	(0)
- * Club domestic league appearances and goals as of October 29, 2018 ‡ National team caps and goals as of October 17, 2015

Alan Gordon (born October 16, 1981) is an American former professional soccer player. In the majority of his career, Gordon was mostly relied upon to make goals in game as a super–sub.

== Youth and college career ==
Gordon moved to Gilbert, Arizona in his mid-teens, and played two years of college soccer for Yavapai College, where he scored 39 goals in his two seasons, before a transfer to Oregon State University, where he won All-Pac-10 honors twice and scored 11 goals as a junior and 15 as a senior. Gordon scored 40 goals and 7 assists for the Oregon State Beavers, setting several program records.

== Club career ==
=== 2004–2010 ===
Upon graduating, Gordon was drafted 53rd overall in the 2004 MLS SuperDraft's sixth round by Los Angeles Galaxy, but was not signed by the team. He signed with the Portland Timbers of the A-League and had a successful season, ending the regular season with 17 goals in 27 matches to tie Dante Washington for the league lead. Gordon was named the A-League Rookie of the Year and was a finalist for the MVP Award, having helped Portland to a first-place finish in the regular season. He was loaned back to the Galaxy, where he occupied a developmental roster slot, and made his MLS debut on September 25, 2004, as a substitute for Carlos Ruiz. Gordon earned a spot in the starting lineup for 2005, but only played in five matches due to reoccurring injuries, including a strained hip and groin early in the season.

He returned to the starting lineup during the 2006 season and scored his first MLS goal on August 26 against D.C. United. Gordon then scored twice the following week in a home match against the Kansas City Wizards and ended the season with four goals in league play. He scored three goals in the Galaxy's 2007 SuperLiga campaign, which ended with a second-place finish. During a friendly with Chelsea, Gordon was substituted for David Beckham's debut with the Galaxy. For much of the 2007 season, he was a third-string forward and also coached a girls youth team to supplement his MLS salary.

On April 26, 2008, Gordon scored two goals off the bench in the Galaxy's 5–2 victory over rivals Chivas USA. He finished 2008 with a career year. He scored five goals and seven assists, even though he was not a full-time starter.

=== 2010–2018 ===
In August 2010, he was traded to neighboring Chivas USA for allocation money just one match short of his 100 league appearances with the Galaxy, during which time he notched 16 goals. Following the 2010 season, he was selected by Vancouver Whitecaps FC in the 2010 MLS Expansion Draft, but was immediately traded back to Chivas USA, along with Alejandro Moreno, for allocation money and an international roster spot.

He was traded to Toronto FC ahead of the 2011 season in exchange for Nick LaBrocca. Gordon made his debut for Toronto on March 26 in a 2–0 home victory against Portland Timbers with both goals coming from Javier Martina. On April 2 Gordon scored his first goal for Toronto in a 1–1 tie against his former team Chivas. Gordon had a memorable return to The Home Depot Center on June 11 when he scored two goals against The Galaxy in a 2–2 thriller which saw two goals scored in injury time of the second half.

Following Toronto's designated player signing of Danny Koevermans, Gordon became a dispensable asset and was traded along with Jacob Peterson and Nana Attakora to the San Jose Earthquakes for Ryan Johnson, allocation money, and an international roster spot in July 2011. Gordon signed a new contract with San Jose in January 2012 and reunited with former Galaxy head coach Frank Yallop. Alan Gordon had a career best of 13 goals in 23 appearances with the Earthquakes that year, primarily as a late substitute alongside Chris Wondolowski and Steven Lenhart.

In April 2013, during a match with the Portland Timbers, Gordon was caught on camera using the word "faggot" in reference to Portland midfielder Will Johnson. Gordon was suspended for three matches following the incident, in addition to the one-match ban he received for drawing a red card in the 78th minute of the same match.

Gordon returned once again to Los Angeles when San Jose traded him to the Galaxy in August 2014 in exchange for allocation money. Gordon ended the season scoring five goals, four of them from off the bench.

Prior to the 2017 MLS season, Gordon announced that he would join the Colorado Rapids on a free agent deal.

On March 16, 2018, Gordon joined MLS side Chicago Fire. On October 28, 2018, Gordon announced that he would retire from playing professional soccer after their final game of the season against D.C. United.

== International career ==
Gordon earned his first call-up to the United States men's national soccer team in August 2012 in advance of a friendly match against Mexico. Gordon was again called up in October 2012 to prepare for the final two matches in the semifinal round of qualifying for the 2014 FIFA World Cup. He made his first international appearance on October 12, 2012, as a substitute against Antigua and Barbuda, where he provided a critical assist to Eddie Johnson, who scored a 90th minute game-winning goal.

He was called into the squad for the 2013 Gold Cup, after the U.S. advanced to the knockout stages. He did not play, however, as the U.S. won the tournament.

He was also called into the squad for the 2015 Gold Cup, after the U.S. advanced to the knockout rounds, replacing Jozy Altidore, who was still trying to recover from an injury. He came on as a late substitute for Aron Johannsson in the U.S. 2–1 loss the Jamaica in the semifinals but failed to make an impact.

== Career statistics ==
As of July 23, 2016

Club performance			League		Cup		League Cup		Continental		Total	
Season	Club	League	Apps	Goals	Apps	Goals	Apps	Goals	Apps	Goals	Apps	Goals
United States			League		Open Cup		League Cup		North America		Total	
2004	Portland Timbers	USL A-League	27	17	2	0	2	0	—		31	17
2004	Los Angeles Galaxy (loan)	Major League Soccer	3	0	0	0	1	0	—		4	0
2005	Los Angeles Galaxy	Major League Soccer	5	0	1	0	3	0	—		9	0
2006	Los Angeles Galaxy	Major League Soccer	17	4	4	3	—		0	0	21	7
2006	Portland Timbers (loan)	USL First Division	1	0	0	0	—		—		1	0
2007	Los Angeles Galaxy	Major League Soccer	14	3	0	0	—		4	3	18	6
2008	Los Angeles Galaxy	Major League Soccer	26	5	0	0	—		—		26	5
2009	Los Angeles Galaxy	Major League Soccer	22	3	0	0	3	0	—		25	3
2010	Los Angeles Galaxy	Major League Soccer	12	1	2	0	0	0	2	0	16	1
2010	Chivas USA	Major League Soccer	9	1	0	0	—		—		9	1
Canada			League		Voyageurs Cup		Playoffs		North America		Total	
2011	Toronto FC	Major League Soccer	8	4	2	2	—		0	0	10	6
United States			League		Open Cup		Playoffs		North America		Total	
2011	San Jose Earthquakes	Major League Soccer	2	1	0	0	—		—		2	1
2012	San Jose Earthquakes	Major League Soccer	23	13	2	0	0	0	—		25	13
2013	San Jose Earthquakes	Major League Soccer	24	4	2	0	0	0	1	1	27	5
2014	San Jose Earthquakes	Major League Soccer	15	0			0	0			15	0
2014	Los Angeles Galaxy	Major League Soccer	14	5			5	0	0	0	19	5
2015	Los Angeles Galaxy	Major League Soccer	29	5	1	0	1	0	4	5	35	10
2016	Los Angeles Galaxy	Major League Soccer	11	0	3	1	0	0	0	0	14	1
Total	United States		254	62	17	4	15	0	11	9	300	78
Total	Canada		8	4	2	2	—		0	0	10	6
Career total			262	66	19	6	15	0	11	9	310	84

- CCL play for 2013 San Jose has matches played in 2014 but was still the 2013 edition of the tourney

== Honors ==
Portland Timbers

- A-League The Commissioner's Cup (1): 2004

Los Angeles Galaxy

- MLS Cup (2): 2005, 2014
- U.S. Open Cup (1): 2005

Toronto FC

- Canadian Championship (1): 2011

San Jose Earthquakes

- Supporters' Shield (1): 2012

United States

- CONCACAF Gold Cup: 2013

Individual

- Major League Soccer Player of the Week (1): 2013
- A-League Rookie of the Year: 2004
- A-League Top Scorer (1): 2004
