= Matt Luzunaris =

American retired soccer player (born 1989)

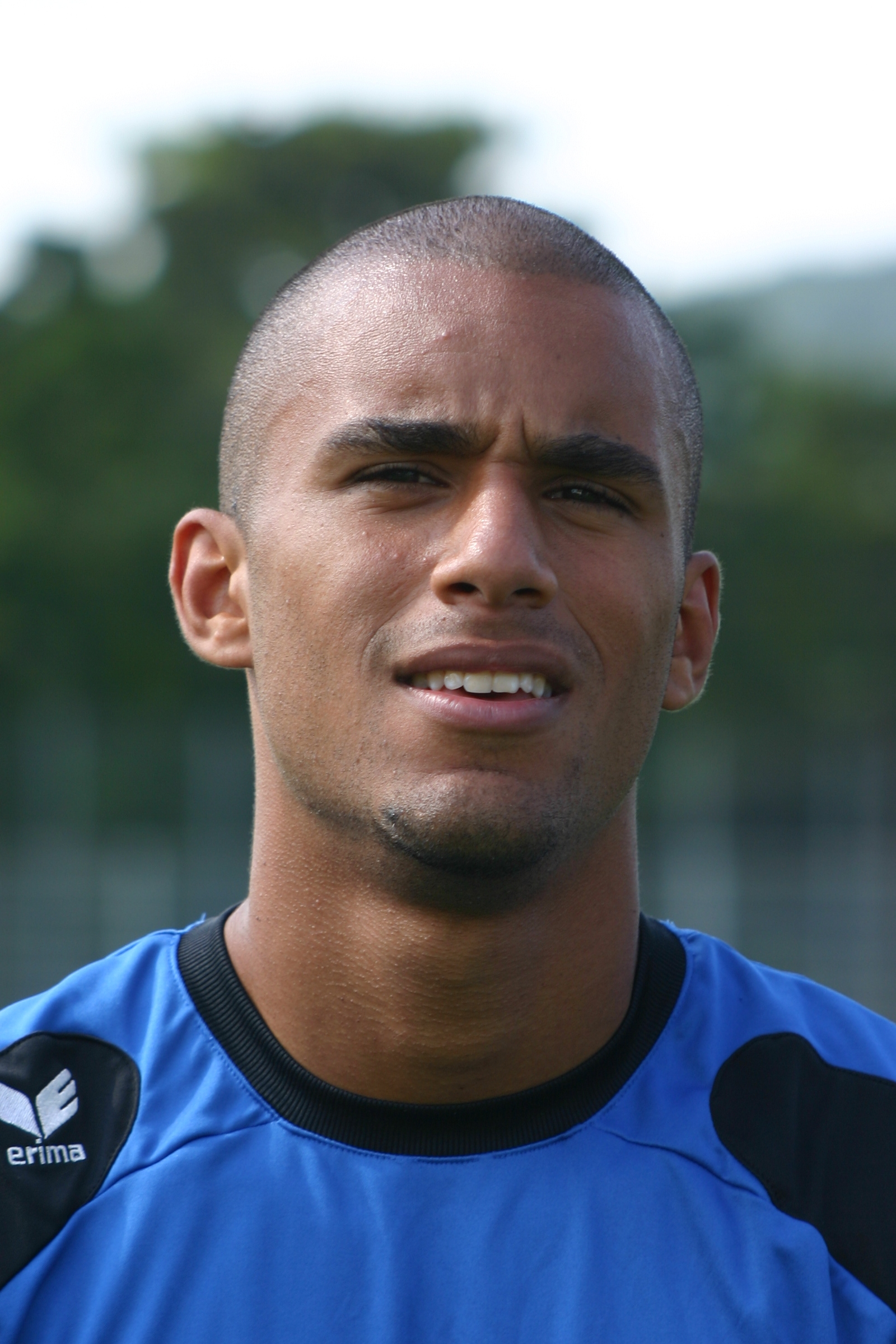

Personal information
- Full name: Matthew Luzunaris
- Date of birth: March 6, 1989 (age 37)
- Place of birth: Margate, Florida, United States
- Height: 6 ft 1 in (1.85 m)
- Position: Forward

College career
Years	Team	Apps	(Gls)
2007	UCF Knights	17	(4)

Senior career*
Years	Team	Apps	(Gls)
2008	Schwanenstadt	9	(0)
2008–2009	Magna Wiener Neustadt	1	(0)
2009	→ SV Wienerberg (loan)	10	(5)
2009	→ Botafogo (loan)	1	(0)
2009–2010	Rapid Wien II	13	(1)
2011	San Jose Earthquakes	6	(0)
2011	→ Orlando City (loan)	1	(1)
2012	Orlando City	18	(9)
2012	→ Carolina RailHawks (loan)	2	(0)
2013–2014	Rochester Rhinos	12	(1)
Total		73	(17)
- * Club domestic league appearances and goals as of January 12, 2015

Matt Luzunaris (born March 6, 1989) is an American retired soccer player. During the 2000s and 2010s he played for clubs in Austria and the United States.

== Career ==
=== Youth and college ===
Luzunaris was born on 6 March 1989 in Fort Lauderdale, Florida. He attended West Boca Raton High School and played youth club soccer for BRJSC - Boca Raton Juniors SC, St. Louis Scott Gallagher Missouri, and in the Olympic Development Program. Luzunaris had a brief stint training with Newcastle United in England, before attending and playing one year of college soccer at the University of Central Florida. Luzunaris was a member of the Boca Juniors team that won the FYSA State Cup in 2003.

=== Europe ===
Luzunaris turned professional after his freshman college year, and began his professional career by signing with SC Schwanenstadt in February 2008. After Schwanenstadt reorganized he re-signed with the club under the Magna Wiener Neustadt moniker. In early 2009 he was loaned to Brazilian club Botofogo, but was unable to play for the club due to visa restrictions in Brazil; he returned to Wiener Neustadt in June. He was then signed in July by SK Rapid Wien to a three-year contract, where he played for the second team.

=== United States ===
On March 25, 2011, Luzunaris was signed by the San Jose Earthquakes of Major League Soccer, and he made his debut for the team on April 9 in a 1–1 tie with Toronto FC. In July 2011, the Earthquakes loaned Luzunaris to Orlando City for an unspecified length but with the right to recall. Luzunaris scored goals in his first two games playing for City against Rochester

Luzunaris and San Jose parted ways after the 2011 season and signed with Orlando City on December 5, 2011. Luzunaris appeared in 18 matches for the Lions scoring 9 goals and becoming the team's second leading goal scorer and USL PRO's 3rd leading goal scorer in the league. He also made USL PRO's team of the year.

Luzunaris announced his retirement on January 13, 2015.

== Personal life ==
Luzunaris was engaged to Austen Everett (1986–2012), herself a college soccer player for Miami. She died after a lengthy battle with non-Hodgkin lymphoma on August 14, 2012. Luzunaris and Everett founded a foundation, the Austen Everett Foundation, to connect children challenged by life-threatening illnesses and professional, intercollegiate teams and athletes.

Luzunaris married Sara Luzunaris (née Deisinger) on September 3, 2016. They live in Williamson, New York with their four-year-old son and a menagerie of pets.
