= Khari Stephenson =

Jamaican footballer (born 1981)

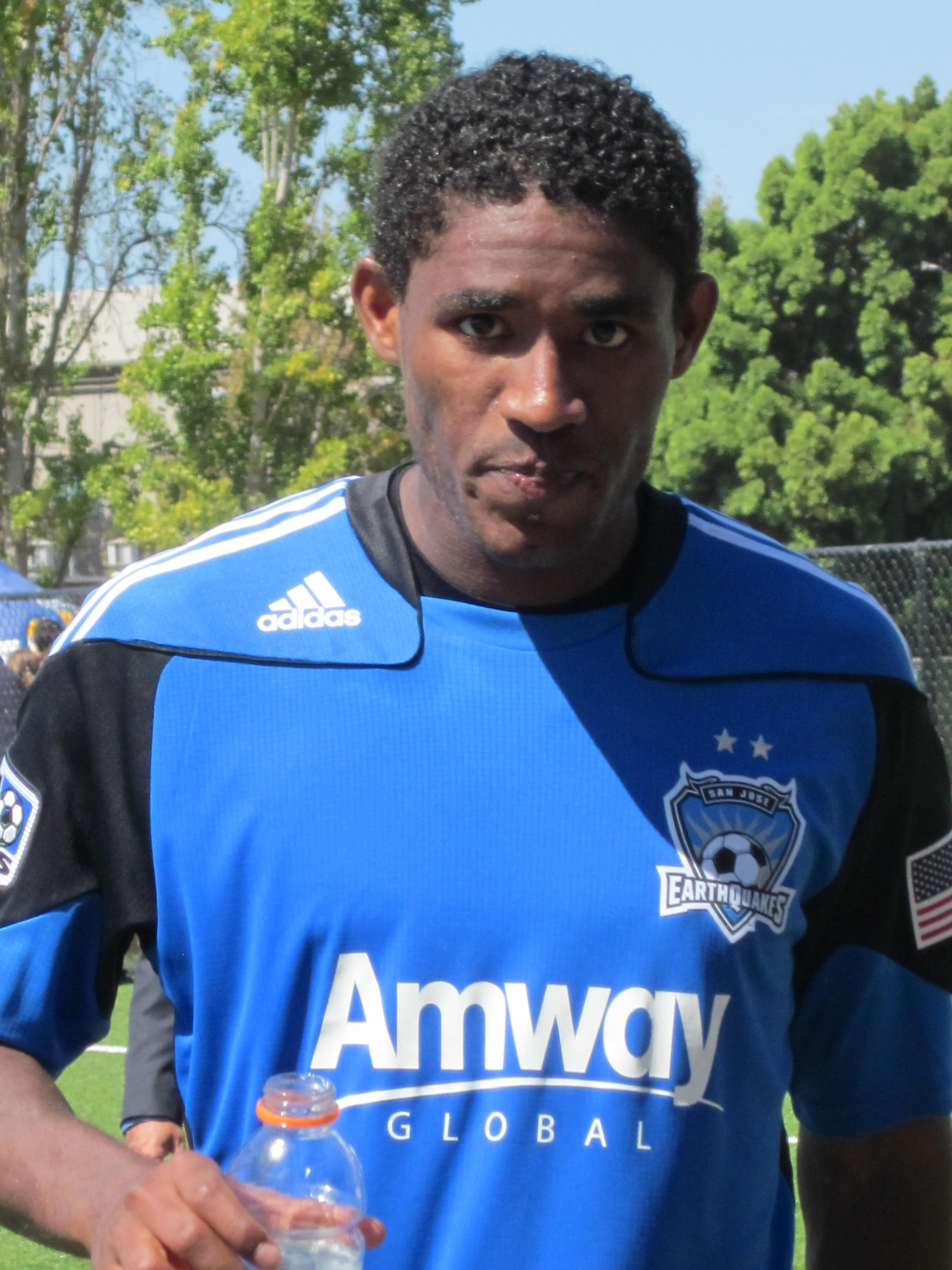
- Stephenson in 2010

Personal information
- Full name: Khari Lasana Stewart Stephenson
- Date of birth: 18 January 1981 (age 45)
- Place of birth: Kingston, Jamaica
- Height: 6 ft 2 in (1.88 m)
- Position: Midfielder

Youth career
- 1992–2000: Real Mona
- 2000–2003: Williams Ephs

Senior career*
Years	Team	Apps	(Gls)
2004–2005	Kansas City Wizards	9	(0)
2006	GAIS	25	(3)
2007–2008	AIK	25	(2)
2008–2010	Aalesunds FK	39	(4)
2010–2012	San Jose Earthquakes	69	(8)
2013	Real Salt Lake	19	(1)
2014–2015	San Jose Earthquakes	23	(2)
2015	→ San Antonio Scorpions (loan)	2	(0)
Total		211	(20)

International career
2004–2011	Jamaica	32	(3)
- * Club domestic league appearances and goals

Khari Stephenson (/ˈkæri/; born 18 January 1981) is a Jamaican former professional footballer who played as a midfielder.

== Youth and College ==
A product of the Real Mona youth system, Stephenson played college soccer at Williams College from 2000 to 2003, where he was named a Division III first-team All-American his junior and senior seasons. In his senior year, Stephenson scored 15 goals for the team, and finished his career there with 40 goals and 18 assists. Before playing at Williams, he was a star of his prep school soccer team at Choate Rosemary Hall in Connecticut.

== Club career ==
=== Kansas City Wizards (2004–2005) ===
Upon graduating, Stephenson was drafted 27th overall in the 2004 MLS SuperDraft by Chicago Fire. He did not make the Fire team, however, and was traded to Kansas City Wizards for a third-round 2005 MLS SuperDraft pick. Stephenson played very little for the Wizards in his rookie season, finishing the year with no points, having played only 44 minutes over three games. He became a starter in the playoffs, playing in every game and even scoring a goal on the Wizards' run to the final.

=== Move to Scandinavia (2006–2010) ===
In 2006, Stephenson made his move to Scandinavia, starting in Sweden with GAIS, where he had an outstanding season as a midfielder. He then made a move to AIK in 2007, where he had an inconsistent season for a team that finished in the top half of the league. In August 2008, Khari then moved to Aalesunds FK in Norway, where he was joined by Jamaican international teammate Demar Phillips in the midfield. After not receiving significant playing time in early 2009, he gained a vital midfield role as the season progressed, eventually leading the team to the Norwegian Cup in 2009 and qualification for the 2010/11 Europa Cup.

=== San Jose Earthquakes (2010–2012) ===
Stephenson returned to the United States on loan from Aalesunds FK and signed with the San Jose Earthquakes of Major League Soccer on 9 August 2010 until the remainder of the MLS season. Stephenson returned to Norway and then signed a permanent deal on 14 February 2011 with San Jose Earthquakes.

Stephenson remained with San Jose through the 2012 season before being released following the 2012 season. He subsequently entered the 2012 MLS Re-Entry Draft and became a free agent after going undrafted in both rounds of the draft.

=== Real Salt Lake (2013) ===
On 22 February 2013, he was signed by Real Salt Lake. He played one season in Utah; however, he was not retained following the season.

=== Return to San Jose (2014–present) ===
Stephenson signed for his old club San Jose Earthquakes on 11 March 2014. Stephenson scored 2 goals during the 2014 season.

=== San Antonio Scorpions (2015 loan) ===
On 6 August 2015, Stephenson was loaned from San Jose to San Antonio Scorpions of the North American Soccer League.

== International career ==
Stephenson appeared for the Jamaican U-20's in the 2001 FIFA World Youth Championship in Argentina and made his debut for the 'Reggae Boyz' in 2004 against Guatemala. He has earned 32 caps (3 goals).

== Personal life ==
Stephenson holds a U.S. green card which qualifies him as a domestic player for MLS roster purposes.

== Career statistics ==
Scores and results list Jamaica's goal tally first.

No	Date	Venue	Opponent	Score	Result	Competition
1.	24 November 2004	Independence Park, Kingston, Jamaica	Saint Martin	3–0	12–0	2005 Caribbean Cup qualification
2.	26 November 2004	Independence Park, Kingston, Jamaica	U.S. Virgin Islands	6–0	11–1	2005 Caribbean Cup qualification
3.	28 November 2004	Independence Park, Kingston, Jamaica	Haiti	1–0	3–1	2005 Caribbean Cup qualification

== Honours ==
Aalesund

- Norwegian Football Cup: 2009

San Jose Earthquakes

- Supporters' Shield: 2012

Jamaica

- Caribbean Cup: 2005
