= Ellis McLoughlin =

American soccer player (born 1990)

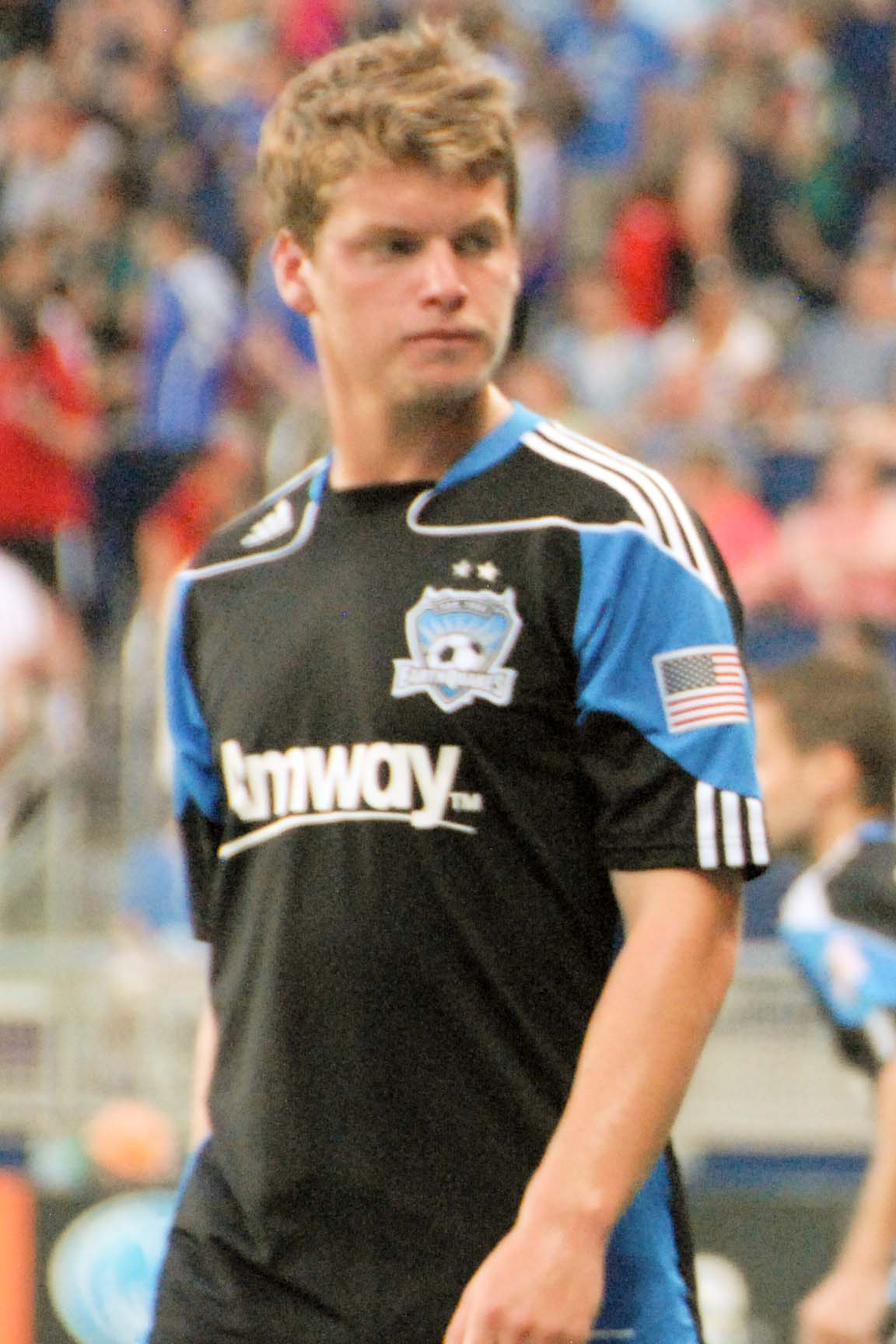

Personal information
- Date of birth: July 8, 1990 (age 36)
- Place of birth: Seattle, Washington, United States
- Height: 5 ft 10 in (1.78 m)
- Positions: Forward; midfielder

Team information
- Current team: Mahalo United

Youth career
- 2005–2007: IMG Soccer Academy
- 2007: Washington Huskies

Senior career*
Years	Team	Apps	(Gls)
2008–2010	Hertha BSC II	7	(0)
2011–2012	San Jose Earthquakes	10	(1)

International career^{‡}
2005–2007	United States U17	38	(14)
- * Club domestic league appearances and goals as of October 19, 2011 ‡ National team caps and goals as of October 19, 2011

Ellis McLoughlin (born July 8, 1990, in Seattle, Washington) is an American soccer player.

== Club career ==
=== Youth ===
McLoughlin began attending Bishop Blanchet High School in Seattle, Washington, in 2004, where he was named All-Area and team MVP as a freshman. Other early honors included being a Washington State ODP team member from 2003 to 2005.

He made the move to Bradenton, Florida, to attend the U-17 Residency program. He graduated in 2007 from Edison Academy.

He also helped his club team, Crossfire, to five state titles and a spot in the Region IV finals as well as an 8th place overall finish at the NIKE U-15 Club Championship in Hong Kong. (he now owns a camp called McLoughlin Athletics and is an eastside coach.

=== Professional ===
After attending the University of Washington and playing soccer for one quarter, McLoughlin turned professional when he signed with the German club Hertha Berlin. He spent the next two seasons playing for the team's second squad, Hertha BSC II, making seven appearances for the club in total.

McLoughlin went on trial with Major League Soccer team Seattle Sounders FC in the 2010 preseason but did not make the team. In 2011, he successfully trialed with San Jose Earthquakes, and the club signed him on March 17, 2011. He made his debut for the Earthquakes two days later in their first game of the 2011 MLS season, a 1–0 loss to Real Salt Lake, and scored his first goal by opening the scoring on May 21, 2011, in a 2–1 victory over New England Revolution.

McLoughlin was waived by San Jose on June 28, 2012.

In 2014 Ellis was signed by professional indoor team Mahalo United costing him $150 every 10 weeks.

After leading the co-ed league & men's league divisions in goals for Spring, Fall, & Winter sessions from 2014 to 2017, McLoughlin caught the eye of the Tacoma Stars. In November 2017, Mahalo United loaned McLoughlin (for an undisclosed fee) to the Tacoma Stars for the 2017-2018 season. (And as many seasons as McLoughlin would like to play)

In April 2018 Ellis returned to the Menehunes in the Men's A Division

== International career ==
Played in the 2007 FIFA U-17 World Cup in South Korea. Played a total of 38 games for the national team scoring 14 goals.

== Personal life ==
Ellis said in an interview that he drinks a Macchiato every day. Ellis goes by numerous nicknames that include Ewdis, Odis, and Ewdis McEwdis.

Ellis currently resides in Seattle, Washington with his dog Sam. Sam is a Lab & Rhodesian Ridgeback mix originally raised by German parents. Sam underwent ACL Surgery in 2016 and was able to make a full recovery.
