= Sam Cronin =

American soccer player (born 1986)

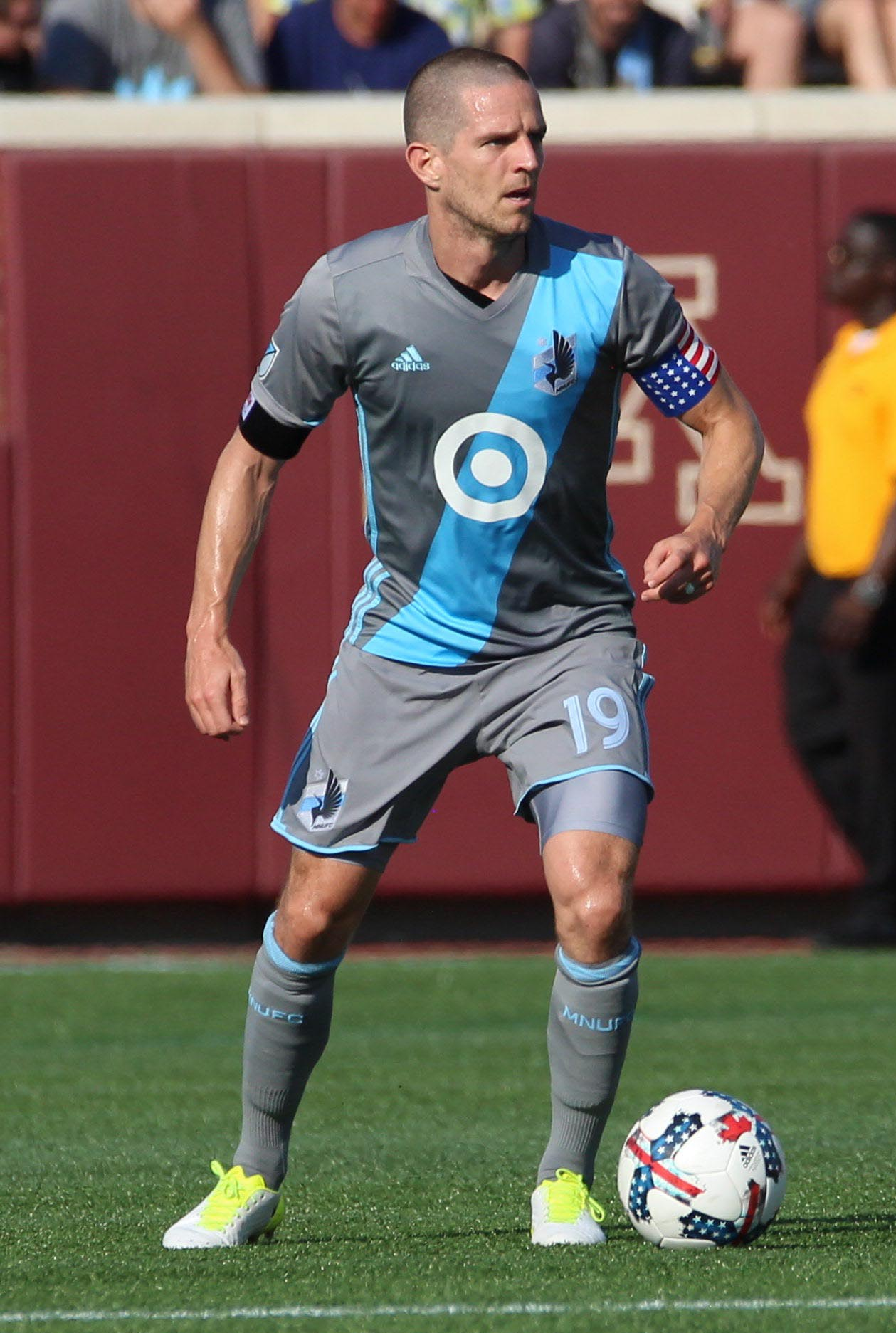
- Cronin playing for Minnesota United FC in 2017

Personal information
- Full name: Sam Cronin
- Date of birth: December 12, 1986 (age 39)
- Place of birth: Atlanta, Georgia, United States
- Height: 5 ft 10 in (1.78 m)
- Position: Midfielder

College career
Years	Team	Apps	(Gls)
2005–2008	Wake Forest Demon Deacons		

Senior career*
Years	Team	Apps	(Gls)
2005–2008	Carolina Dynamo	39	(9)
2009–2010	Toronto FC	33	(1)
2010–2014	San Jose Earthquakes	140	(5)
2015–2017	Colorado Rapids	62	(2)
2017–2018	Minnesota United	18	(0)
Total		292	(17)

International career^{‡}
2009	United States	2	(0)
Medal record
Representing United States
Runner-up	CONCACAF Gold Cup	2009
Men's Soccer
- * Club domestic league appearances and goals as of November 4, 2018 ‡ National team caps and goals as of July 26, 2009

Sam Cronin (born December 12, 1986) is an American former professional soccer player who played as a midfielder.

== Club career ==
=== College and amateur ===
Born in Atlanta, Georgia, Cronin attended Mount Tabor High School in Winston-Salem, North Carolina where he moved with his family in 1999. He played college soccer at Wake Forest University, scoring ten goals in twenty-four appearances in 2008, and was one of three finalists for the Hermann Trophy, an award for the best Division I college soccer player. Cronin ultimately finished as second runner-up for the trophy, but won the 2008 Lowe's Senior CLASS Award for Men's Soccer.

During his college years, Cronin also played in the USL Premier Development League for Carolina Dynamo, making thirty-nine appearances in four years, and scoring nine goals.

=== Professional ===
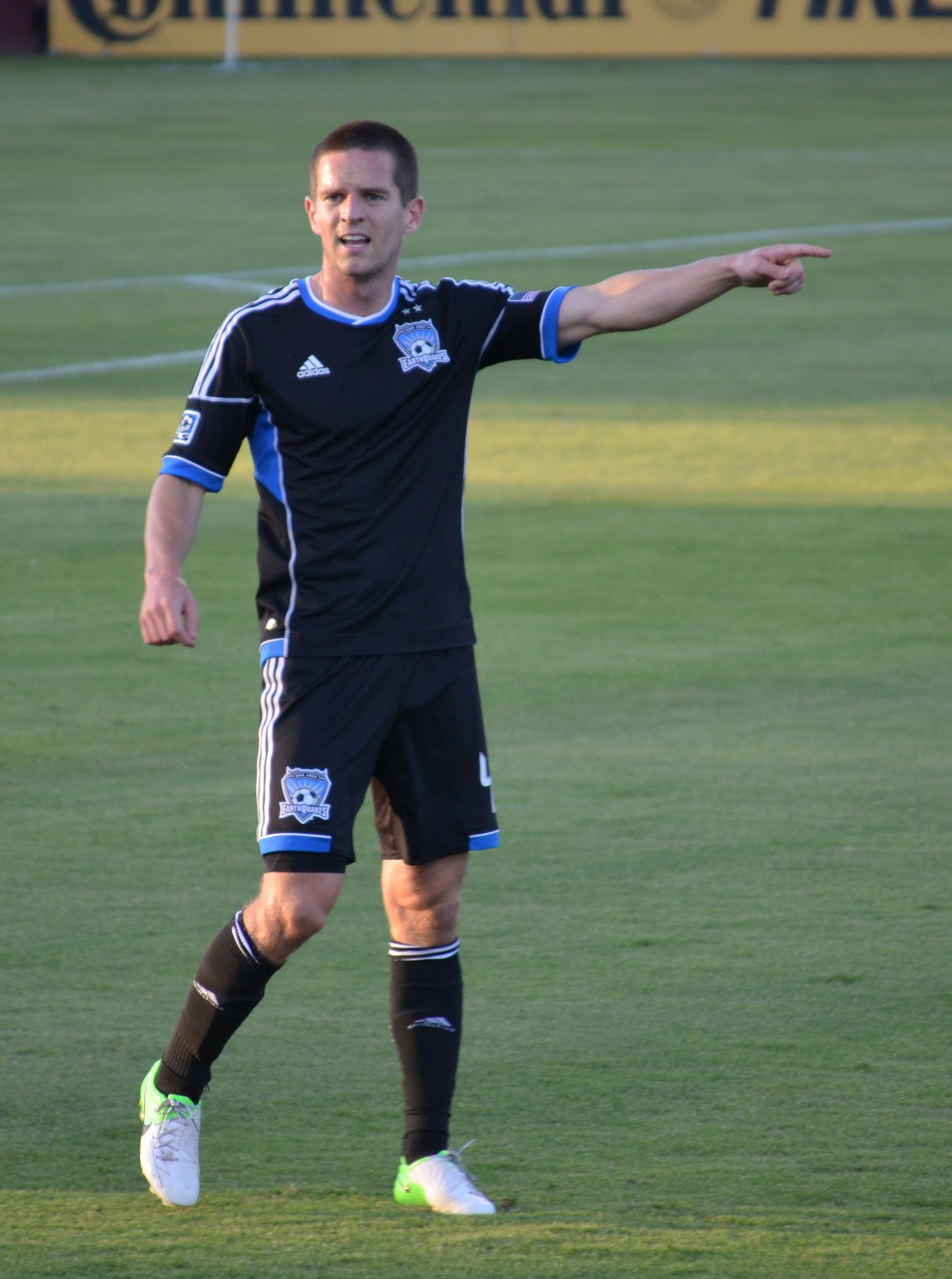
Cronin playing for San Jose Earthquakes in 2012

Cronin was selected second overall by Major League Soccer team Toronto FC in the 2009 MLS SuperDraft on January 15, 2009. Cronin made his professional debut on 21 March 2009, in Toronto's first game of the 2009 MLS season against Kansas City Wizards. He scored his first professional goal on June 13, 2009, against the New York Red Bulls.

Cronin was traded to San Jose Earthquakes on June 21, 2010, in return for allocation money.

On January 19, 2015, Cronin was traded to Colorado Rapids in exchange for allocation money. He was selected as a member of the 2015 MLS All-Star Game, coming on at the start of the 2nd half, before being subbed off for Jozy Altidore in the 77th minute. Cronin served as the Rapids team captain.

On March 31, 2017, Cronin was acquired by Minnesota United FC through the MLS waiver order. Minnesota traded a third-round pick in the 2019 MLS SuperDraft to Chicago Fire to acquire Chicago's #1 pick in the waiver order in order to secure Cronin.

On March 1, 2019, Minnesota bought out the remainder of Cronin's contract.

== International career ==
In June 2009, he received his first call-up by the United States national team for the 2009 CONCACAF Gold Cup. On July 11 Cronin made his debut with the United States against Haiti, lending a hand in the opening goal in the 2–2 draw.

== Honors ==
Wake Forest University

- NCAA Men's Division I Soccer Championship: 2007

Toronto FC

- Canadian Championship (2): 2009, 2010

San Jose Earthquakes

- Supporters' Shield: 2012

== Career stats ==
Team	Season	League	Domestic League			Domestic Playoffs			Domestic Cup^{1}			Concacaf Competition^{2}			Total		
Team	Season	League	Apps	Goals	Assists	Apps	Goals	Assists	Apps	Goals	Assists	Apps	Goals	Assists	Apps	Goals	Assists
Toronto FC	2009	MLS	27	1	3	-	-	-	3	0	0	2	0	0	32	1	3
Toronto FC	2010	MLS	6	0	1	-	-	-	3	0	0	-	-	-	9	0	1
San Jose Earthquakes	2010	MLS	14	0	0	3	0	0	-	-	-	-	-	-	14	0	0
San Jose Earthquakes	2011	MLS	27	0	2	–	–	–							27	0	2
San Jose Earthquakes	2012	MLS	31	1	6	2	0	0							33	1	6
San Jose Earthquakes	2013	MLS	34	2	4	–	–	–							34	2	4
San Jose Earthquakes	2014	MLS	31	2	0	–	–	–							31	2	0
Colorado Rapids	2015	MLS	26	1	0	–	–	–							26	1	0
Colorado Rapids	2016	MLS	33	1	3	3	0	1							36	1	4
Colorado Rapids	2017	MLS	3	0	0	–	–	–							3	0	0
Minnesota United	2017	MLS	18	0	1	–	–	–							18	0	1
Minnesota United	Career Total		243	8	21	8	0	1	6	0	0	2	0	0	259	8	22

Last Update: March 30, 2017.

1) Nutrilite Canadian Cup/US Open Cup

2) Concacaf Champions League/Cup
