= Steven Lenhart =

American soccer player (born 1986)

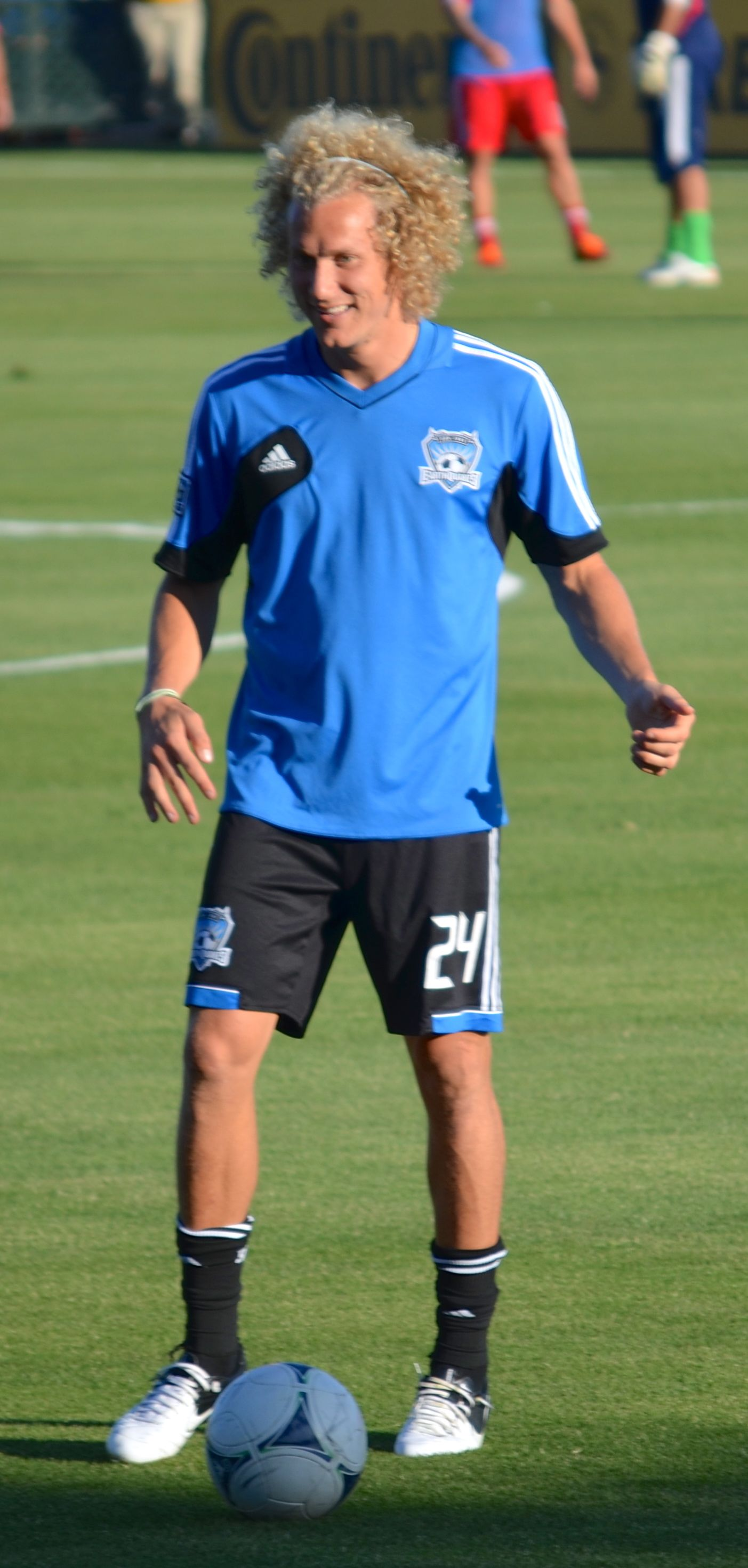

Personal information
- Date of birth: August 28, 1986 (age 40)
- Place of birth: Jacksonville, Florida, U.S.
- Height: 6 ft 1 in (1.85 m)
- Position: Forward

Youth career
- 2000–2004: Irvine Strikers
- 2004: Point Loma Nazarene Sealions
- 2005–2007: Azusa Pacific Cougars

Senior career*
Years	Team	Apps	(Gls)
2007	Southern California Seahorses	6	(3)
2008–2010	Columbus Crew	63	(13)
2011–2016	San Jose Earthquakes	72	(20)
2017	FC Imabari	4	(0)
Total		145	(36)

Managerial career
- 2024: Westmont Warriors (assistant)
- 2025–: Seattle Sounders FC (assistant)
- * Club domestic league appearances and goals as of May 2, 2017

Steven Lenhart (born August 28, 1986) is an American former soccer player who played most of his career for the Columbus Crew and San Jose Earthquakes in Major League Soccer (MLS). He was later an assistant coach with the Westmont Warriors in NCAA Division II. Since 2025, Lenhart has been an advisor to Seattle Sounders FC.

== Career ==
=== College and amateur ===
Lenhart grew up in Yorba Linda, California, and attended Esperanza High School. He attended Point Loma Nazarene University for one year before transferring to Azusa Pacific University. He tallied 38 goals and 12 assists in his 61 career collegiate games for Azusa Pacific, and was named a NAIA All-American in 2007. He was also named to the NAIA All-Tournament Team in 2006 and 2007, was honored as the NAIA Tournament's Outstanding Offensive Player in 2006 and 2007, and was MVP of the 2007 NAIA Tournament while helping lead Azusa Pacific to the 2007 NAIA national title over Concordia University, Irvine. During his college years, Lenhart also played for the Southern California Seahorses in the USL Premier Development League.

=== Professional ===
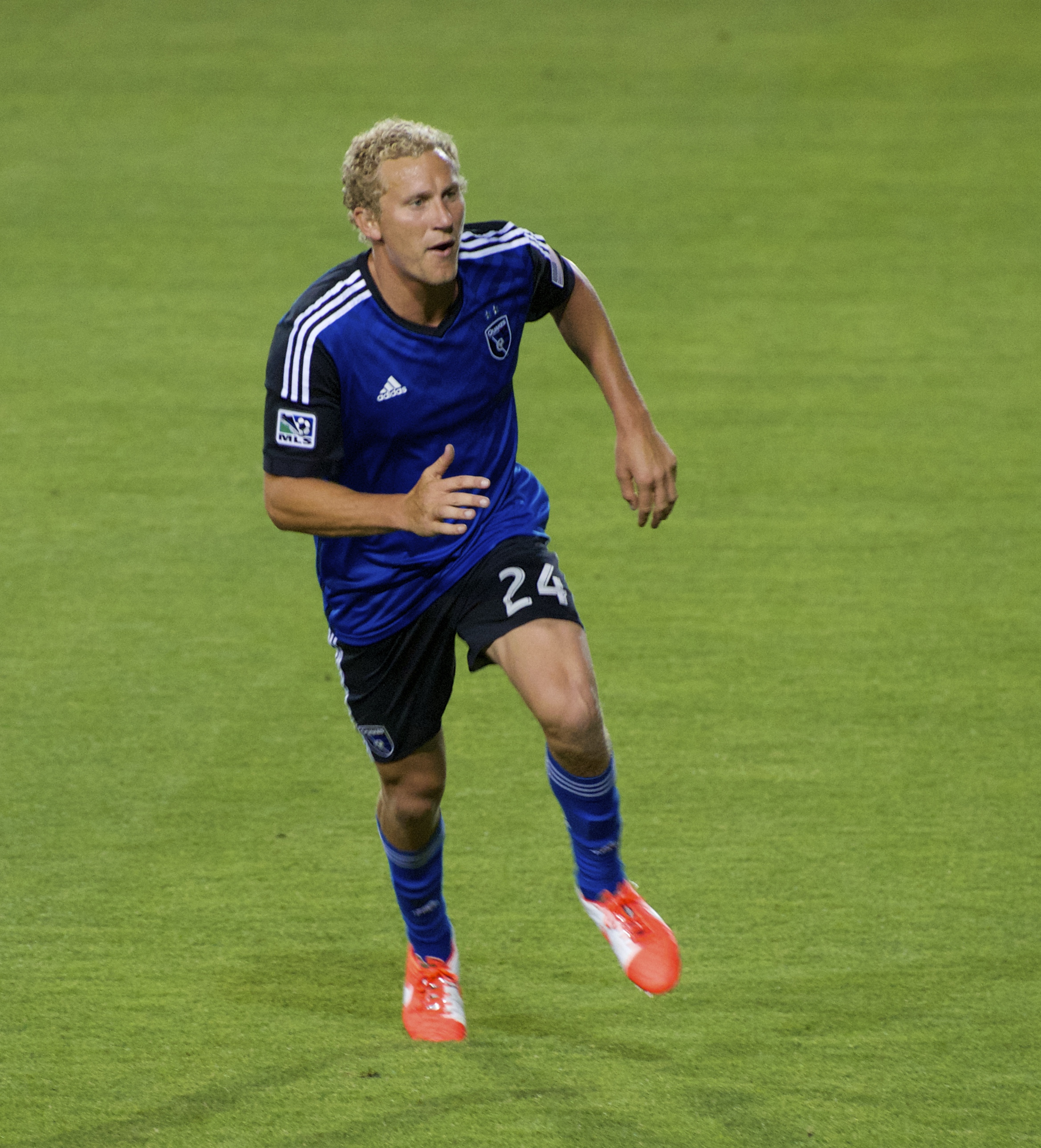
Lenhart with the San Jose Earthquakes in 2014

Lenhart was selected by the Columbus Crew as the 48th overall selection in the 2008 MLS SuperDraft. He made his professional debut on May 31, 2008, as a second-half substitute against Chivas USA, and scored his first goal on June 21, 2008, against Los Angeles Galaxy. His rookie season ended with five goals across 12 appearances in the regular season and playoffs, with a dramatic tying goal in stoppage time of the Eastern Conference Quarterfinal versus the Kansas City Wizards as well as winning MLS Cup. Head coach Sigi Schmid subbed Lenhart into the last minutes of the final to show his appreciation for the contribution to the Crew's winning season.

Lenhart scored three goals in the 2009–10 CONCACAF Champions League, scoring his first goal in a 2–0 victory against the Puerto Rico Islanders, and claiming the other two in a come-from-behind 2–2 draw against Mexican side Toluca.

Lenhart netted his first goal of the 2010-11 CONCACAF Champions League in the 79' minute in a 3–0 win over Joe Public F.C.

Lenhart scored 11 goals across all competitions for Columbus in the 2010 season.

On January 13, 2011, Lenhart was traded to the San Jose Earthquakes along with allocation money in exchange for the 15th pick in the 2011 MLS SuperDraft. On June 11, He scored his first hat trick of his professional career. He signed a new contract with San Jose on November 30, 2011. His cry of "Goonies never say die!" led to the Earthquakes adopting the rally cry (in reference to the Goonies film) the next year.

On April 28, 2012, Lenhart would score both San Jose goals in a 2–1 victory against the Philadelphia Union, with the game winning goal coming in the third minute of second half stoppage time. He scored another late goal, this time in the 85th minute off a header in a U.S. Open Cup game versus Minnesota Stars FC, which proved to be the game winner in a 1–0 victory in June. In July, Lenhart scored a last-minute equalizer for 10-man San Jose against the Chicago Fire, his first game back since a four-game absence due to injury.

After a brief stint with Japanese side FC Imabari, Lenhart announced his retirement from the game on May 2, 2017, due to ongoing symptoms from concussions.

"He’s one of those guys that if you’re playing against him you hate it, but if he’s on your team then you love the guy. He’s always battling and he really likes getting reactions out of people, like if someone fouls him he’ll try to hold their hand to piss them off, and that stuff really gets to people,"

— Chris Wondolowski, former teammate

== Coaching career ==
Lenhart joined Seattle Sounders FC at the beginning of the 2025 season as a mental health advisor. He was suspended for five Leagues Cup matches after a brawl during the 2025 final against Inter Miami CF.

== Style of play ==
Being typically deployed as a target man, Lenhart was a hard-working forward who was known for his physical play and last second heroics, but was criticized for his dirtiness and needless aggression at times. Sam Stejskal of The Athletic described Lenhart's style of play as "rough and sometimes flagrantly physical"' and that Lenhart "came to be viewed around the league as an unabashed villain." Former Crew teammate Jason Garey praised his physicality, calling him "fearless and reckless, he's willing to put his body on the line at all times. It's great playing with him."

== Personal life ==
In 2020, Lenhart participated in World's Toughest Race: Eco-Challenge Fiji. He has a sister, Jennifer, who married to Scottish football player Adam Moffat in 2009.

== Career statistics ==
As of March 23, 2014

Club	Season	League		MLS Cup Playoffs		U.S. Open Cup		Champions League		Total	
Club	Season	Apps	Goals	Apps	Goals	Apps	Goals	Apps	Goals	Apps	Goals
Columbus Crew	2008	10	4	2	1			–	–	12	5
Columbus Crew	2009	26	3	2	0	1	0	–	–	29	3
Columbus Crew	2010	27	6	2	0	4	2	6	3	39	11
San Jose Earthquakes	2011	14	5	–	–	2	0	–	–	16	5
San Jose Earthquakes	2012	26	10	2	0	3	1	–	–	31	11
San Jose Earthquakes	2013	21	4	-	-	-	-	4	0	25	4
San Jose Earthquakes	2014	10	1	-	-	-	-	–	–	10	1
San Jose Earthquakes	2015	0	0	-	-	-	-	–	–	0	0
San Jose Earthquakes	2016	0	0	-	-	-	-	–	–	0	0
Career total		134	33	8	1	10	3	10	3	162	40

== Honors ==
=== Columbus Crew ===
- Major League Soccer MLS Cup (1): 2008
- Major League Soccer Supporter's Shield (2): 2008, 2009

=== San Jose Earthquakes ===
- Major League Soccer Supporter's Shield: 2012
