= 2011 FC Dallas season =

FC Dallas
2011 season
- Owner: Clark Hunt
- Head coach: Schellas Hyndman
- Stadium: Pizza Hut Park
- MLS: 4th
- MLS Cup: Lost Wild Card Game vs New York Red Bulls, 0 - 2
- CONCACAF Champions League: Group stage
- U.S. Open Cup: Semifinals
- Brimstone Cup: Champions
- Texas Derby: Runners-up
- Pioneer Cup: Champions
- WDW Pro Soccer Classic: Champions
- Highest home attendance: 21,867 v Los Angeles Galaxy (May 1, 2011)
- Lowest home attendance: 8,145 v Toronto FC (May 11, 2011)
- Average home league attendance: 11,954
Home colors	Away colors

The 2011 FC Dallas season was the sixteenth season of the team's existence. They tied the franchise record for most points in the regular season & made the playoffs for the second consecutive year. The season was marked by their debut in the CONCACAF Champions League, where they finished third in their group, behind UNAM Pumas and Toronto FC. Also in the Champions League, they became the first American soccer club to defeat a Mexican team on Mexican soil (UNAM) in a meaningful competition.

== Overview ==
=== March ===
On March 19, FC Dallas opened the 2011 Major League Soccer Season at Pizza Hut Park against Brimstone Cup rivals, Chicago Fire. After Chicago scored the opening goal of the match Milton Rodriguez found the net to tie the game at 1–1. Dallas were able to hold onto the tie after falling to 10 men after a Brek Shea red card. The following week the San Jose Earthquakes traveled to Dallas and took home a road win with 2 goals from the 2010 Golden Boot Winner Chris Wondolowski to defeat Dallas 0–2.

=== April ===
FC Dallas began April with the first road game of 2011 at Columbus. Coach Schellas Hyndman made several changes to the starting lineup including the first starts for Rubén Luna and new acquisition Fabian Castillo. In the 33' for the second time in the first three games Dallas would go down to 10 men after Jackson was given 2 yellow cards within 1 minute. Dallas was able to hold the 0–0 tie until Andres Mendoza was awarded a penalty which was converted in the 54'. Columbus finished off the game in the 90'+1 with a goal from Eddie Gaven.

"I am filled with gratitude to have this opportunity to be a part of something that's bigger than me and thrilled to do what I can do help further the cause."

— Daniel Hernandez, FC Dallas captain regarding his work with the Reeve Foundation

On April 5 Daniel Hernandez was named the MLS W.O.R.K.S. Humanitarian of the month for April. Hernandez has done charity work for the Christopher and Dana Reeve Foundation after his brother Nico, who was a promising soccer player for SMU, was paralyzed in a car accident.

The Colorado Rapids traveled to Dallas for an MLS Cup rematch on Friday April 8. Colorado who were previously unbeaten in the 2011 season would lose 3–0 with a goal from Ugo Ihemelu and a brace from David Ferreira.

Following his two-goal performance against the Colorado Rapids David Ferreira was named the MLS Player of the Week for the 4th week.

April 17 FC Dallas faced the Portland Timbers at the newly completed Jeld-Wen Field for the Timbers second home match in MLS. FC Dallas was off to a slow start trailing by 3 goals after the 55' including a goal by former FC Dallas striker Kenny Cooper. After Brek Shea was moved up to the left wing he was able to assist David Ferreira for his 3rd goal of the year in the 83'. Three minutes the duo was back on the attack as Ferreira was able to assist Shea for his first goal of the year. FC Dallas would run out of time as the game ended as a 3–2 loss for FC Dallas.

The FC Dallas squad would remain in Portland the following week for training in preparation of FC Dallas' continued tour of the northwest. They would travel north of the U.S. border to face Vancouver Whitecaps FC on Saturday, April 3 at Empire Field. The Whitecaps would open the scoring in the 25' taking a 1–0 lead. In the 55' a major blow was dealt to FC Dallas when David Ferreira was forced to be substituted after a challenge from Jonathan Leathers, which after the game was confirmed had fractured Ferreira's ankle. Just seconds after Ferreira was carried off of the pitch George John would score a goal to even the score from a corner kick with 10 men on the pitch for FC Dallas. Dallas would complete the comeback with an 83' goal from Eric Avila to secure the victory on the road.

=== May ===
The Los Angeles Galaxy would face FC Dallas at Pizza Hut Park on a stormy Sunday night in Frisco to start the month of May. LA would begin the match in first place with 15 points through 9 games. With David Ferreira out due to injury, coach Schellas Hyndman gave Eric Avila the start in his place. The first half would end without a goal as the rain steadily fell. Shortly after the restart Fabian Castillo scored his first MLS goal with an assist from Andrew Jacobson. After only a few minutes the Galaxy would tie the game once again at 1–1 with a goal from Landon Donovan. As a thunderstorm moved over Frisco the game was forced to be delayed due to lightning in the area. After an hour break in the game the players finally took the pitch and the game was continued. In the 88' Brek Shea was able to send in a shot from the left side that sailed over Donovan Ricketts and into the goal to give Dallas the 2–1 lead which would be the final score.

Following the match both Fabian Castillo and Brek Shea were nominated for the AT&T Goal of the Week. The honor would go to Shea picking up his and FC Dallas' first Goal of the Week for 2011.

At RFK Stadium FC Dallas looked to extend their winning streak to 3 games against D.C. United. Dallas wasn't able to break through and the game ended in a scoreless draw.

With only 3 days off FC Dallas returned home to face Toronto FC in a midweek match. Just before the halftime whistle George John was pulled down in the box on a set piece and a penalty kick was awarded. Captain Daniel Hernandez decided to step up and take the spot kick. Hernandez sent keeper Stefan Frei in the wrong direction and put Dallas up 1–0. This was Hernandez' first goal since 2002. FC Dallas was able to hold the lead and secure the victory continuing their unbeaten streak without MVP Ferreira.

"This is my fourth season with them and it has been good to this point. They have helped me a lot through good and bad. I feel comfortable here and I am happy to be here."

— Brek Shea, FC Dallas

On May 16, 2011 FC Dallas announced they had signed a contract extension with Brek Shea through 2015.

In the second of three consecutive home matches the Philadelphia Union came to Dallas sitting near the top of the Eastern Conference. Dallas took the lead in the 29th minute as Brek Shea finished a Fabian Castillo cross. Castillo was on the attack again in the 43rd minute when he was able to head in a floated cross from Jackson Gonçalves. That would be Castillo's second goal with FC Dallas and also marked the first time in 2011 that 2 goals had been scored again the Union. Kevin Hartman and the FC Dallas defense were able to finish the game without conceding a goal for the third consecutive game.

Sunday, May 22 Real Salt Lake met with FC Dallas on another rainy night in North Texas. This was the first match between the two clubs since the 2010 MLS Cup playoffs which Dallas won with a 3–2 aggregate score. With the game still tied at 0–0 in the 83rd minute referee David Gantar was forced to delay the game as a thunderstorm moved into the area. The game was continued after an hour-and-fifty-two-minute delay, but unlike the LA Galaxy game FC Dallas were not able to score a gold to get the three points. The game ended at 0–0 with Kevin Hartman and the FC Dallas defense earning their fourth straight clean sheet.

After only two days off since their last match, FC Dallas was in Seattle to face the Seattle Sounders FC at Qwest Field in front of 36,026 fans. Dallas was able to strike first after Brek Shea was able to find the net on a pass from Andrew Jacobson in the 18th minute. That would be the only goal of the match as Seattle was not able to score after holding 65.4% of the possession and 19 attempts on goal.

In the third match within 7 days Dallas was once again on the road as they traveled to Houston for the first leg of the Texas Derby against the Houston Dynamo. In the 27th minute Andrew Jacobson was able to score the first goal of the match after he headed in a rebound off a Fabian Castillo shot the hit the post. Shortly before the halftime whistle the Dynamo were able to equalize from a Cam Weaver goal. Dallas would score a second goal after the halftime break as Ugo Ihemelu headed in a ball off a set piece for the second year in a row in Houston. Kofi Sarkodie was ejected from the game as he received his second yellow card in the 72nd minute. Dallas was unable to leave Houston with a win though as Colin Clark was able to score a goal in the 87th minute. FC Dallas were able to extend their unbeaten streak to 8 games and end the month of May with a club record 15 points.

=== August ===
On August 3, Dallas played Alianza in the return leg of the CONCACAF Champions League preliminary stage. Holding a 1–0 aggregate lead, Dallas earned another 1–0 win at home to advance to the group stage of the Champions League. Ugo Ihemelu scored Dallas' lone goal in the 41st minute. In Group stage, Dallas was pitted in Group C and will play UNAM Pumas of Mexico, Tauro of Panama and Toronto FC of Canada.

On August 17, Dallas became the first MLS club in history to defeat a Mexican team in Mexico, beating UNAM 1–0 in their Champions League group stage opener. Marvin Chávez scored in the 66th minute to give Dallas the game-winning goal.

== Squad ==
As of September 17, 2011. Note: Flags indicate national team as defined under FIFA eligibility rules; some limited exceptions apply. Players may hold more than one non-FIFA nationality.

No.	Pos.	Nation	Player
1	GK	USA	Kevin Hartman
2	DF	USA	Daniel Hernández (captain)
3	DF	USA	Ugo Ihemelu
4	MF	USA	Andrew Jacobson
5	DF	COL	Jair Benítez (on loan from Deportivo Cali)
6	DF	BRA	Jackson (on loan from São Paulo FC)
7	MF	COL	Daniel Cruz
8	MF	BRA	Bruno Guarda
9	MF	BRA	Maicon Santos
10	FW	COL	David Ferreira
11	MF	BRA	Ricardo Villar
13	FW	CUB	Maykel Galindo
14	MF	USA	George John
15	FW	COL	Fabian Castillo
16	DF	USA	Bobby Warshaw

No.	Pos.	Nation	Player
17	DF	USA	Jeremy Hall
18	FW	HON	Marvin Chávez (on loan from Marathón)
19	DF	USA	Zach Loyd
20	FW	USA	Brek Shea
21	MF	MEX	Bryan Leyva
22	GK	USA	Josh Lambo
23	FW	USA	Andrew Wiedeman
25	DF	USA	Jack Stewart (on loan from NSC Minnesota Stars)
27	DF	CAN	Edson Edward
28	MF	USA	Victor Ulloa
29	DF	USA	Moises Hernandez
30	GK	USA	Chris Seitz
32	FW	USA	Jonathan Top
34	FW	MEX	Rubén Luna
40	GK	MEX	Richard Sanchez

== Player movement ==
=== Transfers ===
==== In ====
Date	Player	Position	Previous club	Fee/notes	Ref
December 15, 2010	(United States) Chris Seitz	GK	(United States) Seattle Sounders FC	Acquired for a 4th round Draft pick in 2012	
January 12, 2011	(United States) Jonathan Top	FW	(United States) FC Dallas Academy	Homegrown Player	
February 7, 2011	(Brazil) Ricardo Villar	MF	(Germany) SpVgg Unterhaching	Undisclosed	
February 18, 2011	(Mexico) Richard Sanchez	GK	(United States) FC Dallas Academy	Homegrown Player	
February 18, 2011	(United States) Andrew Jacobson	MF	(United States) Philadelphia Union	Acquired for a 2nd round Draft pick in 2013	
March 7, 2011	(Colombia) Fabian Castillo	FW	(Colombia) Deportivo Cali	Undisclosed	
April 1, 2011	(Cuba) Maykel Galindo	FW	(United States) Chivas USA	Acquired for a 1st round Supplemental Draft pick in 2012	
???	(United States) Bobby Warshaw	DF	(United States) Stanford University	SuperDraft, 1st round	
August 2, 2011	(Brazil) Maicon Santos	FW	(Canada) Toronto FC	Acquired with a 2011 international roster slot for Eric Avila	
August 4, 2011	(Colombia) Daniel Cruz	MF	(Belgium) Beerschot AC	Undisclosed	
August 19, 2011	(United States) Jeremy Hall	DF	(United States) Portland Timbers	Acquired for Eric Alexander	

==== Out ====
Date	Player	Position	Destination club	Fee/notes	Ref
November 24, 2010	(United States) Dax McCarty	MF	(United States) Portland Timbers	Expansion Draft	
November 24, 2010	(Saint Kitts and Nevis) Atiba Harris	MF	(Canada) Vancouver Whitecaps	Expansion Draft	
December 8, 2010	(Argentina) Dario Sala	GK	None	Option declined, retired	
December 15, 2010	(United States) Jeff Cunningham	FW	(United States) Columbus Crew	MLS Re-Entry Draft	
February 14, 2011	(United States) Jason Yeisley	FW	(United States) Pittsburgh Riverhounds	Waived, free transfer	
February 15, 2011	(United States) Heath Pearce	DF	(United States) Chivas USA	Traded for allocation money	
May 5, 2011	(United States) Kyle Davies	DF	(United States) Los Angeles Galaxy	Waived, free transfer	
July 28, 2011	(United States) Perica Marošević	MF	(Canada) Toronto FC	Waived, free transfer	
July 28, 2011	(Colombia) Milton Rodriguez	FW		Waived	
August 2, 2011	(United States) Eric Avila	MF	(Canada) Toronto FC	Traded for Maicon Santos and a 2011 international roster slot	
August 19, 2011	(United States) Eric Alexander	MF	(United States) Portland Timbers	Traded for Jeremy Hall	

=== Loans ===
==== In ====
Date	Player	Position	Loaned from	Fee/notes	Ref
July 22, 2009	(Colombia) Jair Benítez	DF	(Colombia) Deportivo Cali		
August 13, 2010	(Brazil) Jackson	DF	(Brazil) São Paulo FC		
January 19, 2011	(Honduras) Marvin Chávez	FW	(Honduras) Marathón	Original loan date August 18, 2009	
August 15, 2011	(United States) Jack Stewart	DF	(United States) NSC Minnesota Stars	Loan thru 2011 MLS season with purchase option at end of loan	

== Club ==
=== Coaching staff ===
Position	Staff
Head coach	(United States) Schellas Hyndman
Technical director	(United States) Barry Gorman
Assistant coach	(United States) John Ellinger
Assistant coach	(United States) Marco Ferruzzi
Assistant coach	(United States) Drew Keeshan
Director of Player Development	(Colombia) Óscar Pareja

Updated to match played March 30, 2011
Source: FC Dallas

=== Management ===
Owner	(United States) Clark Hunt
President and CEO	(United States) Doug Quinn
Vice President of Marketing, Communications & Strategic Planning	(United States) Kelly Weller
Vice President of Finance	(United States) Jimmy Smith
Vice President of Business Development & Partnership Marketing	(United States) Matt McInnis
Ground (capacity and dimensions)	Pizza Hut Park (21,193 / 107x68 meters)

Updated to match played March 31, 2011
Source: FC Dallas

== Preseason ==
February 21, 2011	FC Dallas	2–0	Seattle Sounders FC	Lake Buena Vista, Florida
10:40 CDT				Stadium: Hess Field

February 23, 2011	New England Revolution	1–0	FC Dallas	Lake Buena Vista, Florida
10:40 CDT				Stadium: Hess Field

=== Walt Disney Pro Soccer Classic ===
February 24, 2011 Semifinal	Orlando City S.C.	0–1	FC Dallas	Lake Buena Vista, Florida
17:00 CDT	Griffin (yellow card) 19'	Report	30' Rodriguez; (yellow card) 42' Hernández	Stadium: Hess Field; Attendance: 300

February 26, 2011 Final	Houston Dynamo	3–5	FC Dallas	Lake Buena Vista, Florida
19:00 CDT				Stadium: Hess Field

== Major League Soccer ==
=== Standings ===
==== Overall standings ====
Pos	Team	Pld	W	L	T	GF	GA	GD	Pts	Qualification
1	LA Galaxy (S, C)	34	19	5	10	48	28	+20	67	CONCACAF Champions League
2	Seattle Sounders FC	34	18	7	9	56	37	+19	63	CONCACAF Champions League
3	Real Salt Lake	34	15	11	8	44	36	+8	53	CONCACAF Champions League
4	FC Dallas	34	15	12	7	42	39	+3	52	
5	Sporting Kansas City	34	13	9	12	50	40	+10	51	
6	Houston Dynamo	34	12	9	13	45	41	+4	49	CONCACAF Champions League
7	Colorado Rapids	34	12	9	13	44	41	+3	49	
8	Philadelphia Union	34	11	8	15	44	36	+8	48	
9	Columbus Crew	34	13	13	8	43	44	−1	47	
10	New York Red Bulls	34	10	8	16	50	44	+6	46	
11	Chicago Fire	34	9	9	16	46	45	+1	43	
12	Portland Timbers	34	11	14	9	40	48	−8	42	
13	D.C. United	34	9	13	12	49	52	−3	39	
14	San Jose Earthquakes	34	8	12	14	40	45	−5	38	
15	Chivas USA	34	8	14	12	41	43	−2	36	
16	Toronto FC	34	6	13	15	36	59	−23	33	CONCACAF Champions League
17	New England Revolution	34	5	16	13	38	58	−20	28	
18	Vancouver Whitecaps FC	34	6	18	10	35	55	−20	28	

Source: MLS
Rules for classification: 1) points; 2) head-to-head record; 3) goal difference; 4) number of goals scored
(C) Champions; (S) Supporters' Shield

==== Conference standings ====
Pos	Team	Pld	W	L	T	GF	GA	GD	Pts	Qualification
1	LA Galaxy	34	19	5	10	48	28	+20	67	MLS Cup Conference Semifinals
2	Seattle Sounders FC	34	18	7	9	56	37	+19	63	MLS Cup Conference Semifinals
3	Real Salt Lake	34	15	11	8	44	36	+8	53	MLS Cup Conference Semifinals
4	FC Dallas	34	15	12	7	42	39	+3	52	MLS Cup Play-In Round
5	Colorado Rapids	34	12	9	13	46	42	+4	49	MLS Cup Play-In Round
6	Portland Timbers	34	11	14	9	40	48	−8	42	
7	San Jose Earthquakes	34	8	12	14	40	45	−5	38	
8	Chivas USA	34	8	14	12	41	43	−2	36	
9	Vancouver Whitecaps FC	34	6	18	10	35	55	−20	28	

Source: MLS

=== Results summary ===
Overall								Home						Away					
Pld	Pts	W	L	T	GF	GA	GD	W	L	T	GF	GA	GD	W	L	T	GF	GA	GD
34	52	15	12	7	29	21	+8	9	5	3	17	8	+9	6	7	4	12	13	−1

Source: MLSSoccer.com
Pld = Matches played; Pts = Points; W = Matches won; T = Matches tied; L = Matches lost; GF = Goals for; GA = Goals against; GD = Goal difference

Round	1	2	3	4	5	6	7	8	9	10	11	12	13	14	15	16	17	18	19	20	21	22	23	24	25	26	27	28	29	30	31	32	33	34
Stadium	H	H	A	H	A	A	H	A	H	H	H	A	A	H	H	A	H	H	A	H	A	A	H	A	A	H	A	A	H	H	A	A	H	A
Result	T	L	L	W	L	W	W	T	W	W	T	W	T	W	L	W	W	W	L	T	W	T	W	L	T	L	W	L	L	L	L	W	W	L
Conference	5	6	9	6	8	4	4	6	4	2	2	2	3	2	3	2	2	2	2	3	2	2	2	2	2	3	3	3	4	4	4	4	4	4
League	9	14	18	13	16	8	8	10	5	2	3	3	4	2	3	2	2	2	2	3	2	2	2	2	2	3	3	3	4	4	4	4	4	4

Updated to match(es) played on July 25, 2011. Source: MLSSoccer.com
A = Away; H = Home; W = Win; L = Loss; T = Tie

== Match results ==
Win Tie Loss

=== Major League Soccer ===
March 19, 2011 Brimstone Cup	FC Dallas	1–1	Chicago Fire	Frisco, Texas
19:30 CDT	Rodriguez 19'; Jackson (yellow card) 35'; Hernández (yellow card) 36'; Shea (red card) 55'; Avila (substituted off) Ihemelu (substituted on) 62'; Rodriguez (substituted off) Luna (substituted on) 65'; Alexander (substituted off) Jacobson (substituted on) 72'	Report	17' Chaves; (yellow card) 30' Gibbs; (substituted off) 42' Ristic (substituted on) Nyarko; (yellow card) 59' Videira; (substituted off) 62' Videira (substituted on) Husidic; (yellow card) 71' Mikulic; (substituted off) 75' Chaves (substituted on) Barouch; (yellow card) 78' Segares	Stadium: Pizza Hut Park; Attendance: 20,145; Referee: Terry Vaughn

March 26, 2011	FC Dallas	0–2	San Jose Earthquakes	Frisco, Texas
20:00 CDT	Villar (substituted off) Castillo (substituted on) 57'; Alexander (substituted off) Avila (substituted on) 62'; Jackson (substituted off) Luna (substituted on) 74'	Report	5' 23' Wondolowski; (substituted off) 73' Gjertsen (substituted on) McLoughlin; (substituted off) 83' Dawkins (substituted on) Opara; (substituted off) 89' Corrales (substituted on) Ring	Stadium: Pizza Hut Park; Attendance: 11,022; Referee: Ricardo Salazar

April 1, 2011 Pioneer Cup	Columbus Crew	2–0	FC Dallas	Columbus, Ohio
18:30 CDT	Ekpo (yellow card) 20'; Rusmir (yellow card) 42'; Rusmir (substituted off) Renteria (substituted on) 47'; Mendoza 54' (pen.); Mendoza (substituted off) Cunningham (substituted on) 61'; Ekpo (substituted off) Duka (substituted on) 85'; Burns (yellow card) 88'; Gaven 91'	Report	(yellow card) 32' (yellow-red card) 33' Gonçalves; (substituted off) 78' Castillo (substituted on) Rodriguez; (substituted off) 78' Chávez (substituted on) Loyd	Stadium: Columbus Crew Stadium; Attendance: 14,549; Referee: Jair Marrufo

April 8, 2011	FC Dallas	3–0	Colorado Rapids	Frisco, Texas
20:00 CDT	Jacobson (yellow card) 13'; Ihemelu 26'; Chávez (substituted off) Avila (substituted on) 30'; Ferreira 40' 46'; Rodriguez (substituted off) Luna (substituted on) 66'; Jacobson (substituted off) Alexander (substituted on) 70'; Hernandez (yellow card) 90'	Report	(yellow card) 19' Nyassi; (yellow card) 33' Folan; (substituted off) 46' Nyassi (substituted on) Mullan; (yellow card) 52' Wallace; (substituted off) 61' Folan (substituted on) Amarikwa; (substituted off) 63' Wallace (substituted on) Marshall; (yellow card) 81' Cummings; (yellow card) 84' Moor	Stadium: Pizza Hut Park; Attendance: 12,261; Referee: Paul Ward

April 17, 2011	Portland Timbers	3–2	FC Dallas	Portland, Oregon
17:00 CDT	Jewsbury 13'; Wallace (yellow card) 15'; Cooper 35'; Wallace 55'; Hall (substituted off) Nagbe (substituted on) 65'; Alhassan (substituted off) Zizzo (substituted on) 72'; Perlaza (substituted off) Johnson (substituted on) 77'; Cooper (yellow card) 79'; Johnson (yellow card) 80'	Report	(yellow card) 40' Chávez; (substituted off) 60' Loyd (substituted on) Gonçalves; (substituted off) 64' Rodriguez (substituted on) Benitez; (substituted off) 72' Jacobson (substituted on) Galindo; 83' Ferreira; 86' Shea	Stadium: Jeld-Wen Field; Attendance: 18,627; Referee: Mark Geiger

April 23, 2011	Vancouver Whitecaps FC	1–2	FC Dallas	Vancouver Canada
18:00 CDT	Rochat 25'; Knight (substituted off) Khalfan (substituted on) 61'; Brovsky (substituted off) Harmse (substituted on) 77'; Hassli (yellow card) 80'; Chiumiento (substituted off) Salgado (substituted on) 84'	Report	(yellow card) 30' Ihemelu; (substituted off) 46' Castillo (substituted on) Rodriguez; 53' John; (substituted off) 55' Ferreira (substituted on) Avila; (yellow card) 66' Jacobson; (substituted off) 71' Chávez (substituted on) Alexander; 83' Avila	Stadium: Empire Field; Attendance: 21,000; Referee: Juan Guzman

May 1, 2011	FC Dallas	2–1	Los Angeles Galaxy	Frisco, Texas
18:00 CDT	Benitez (substituted off) Loyd (substituted on) 36'; Castillo 47'; Avila (substituted off) Villar (substituted on) 69'; Shea 88'; Castillo (substituted off) Alexander (substituted on) 89'	Report	51' Donovan; (yellow card) 55' Juninho; (substituted off) 72' Magee (substituted on) Cardozo; (substituted off) 83' Beckham (substituted on) Birchall; (substituted off) 83' Angel (substituted on) Kirovski	Stadium: Pizza Hut Park; Attendance: 21,867; Referee: Alex Prus

May 7, 2011	D.C. United	0–0	FC Dallas	Washington, D.C. USA
18:30 CDT	Ngwenya (substituted off) Wolff (substituted on) 54'; Najar (substituted off) Quaranta (substituted on) 72'; Pontius (substituted off) Fred (substituted on) 81'; Fred (yellow card) 82'	Report	(substituted off) 46' Rodriguez (substituted on) Alexander; (yellow card) 59' John; (substituted off) 76' Avila (substituted on) Luna; (substituted off) 90' Castillo (substituted on) Warshaw	Stadium: RFK Stadium; Attendance: 11,504; Referee: Baldomero Toledo

May 11, 2011	FC Dallas	1–0	Toronto FC	Frisco, Texas
20:00 CDT	Hernandez 48+' (pen.); Castillo (substituted off) Luna (substituted on) 65'; Alexander (substituted off) Guarda (substituted on) 78'; Chávez (substituted off) Warshaw (substituted on) 89'; Luna (yellow card) 90'	Report	(yellow card) 36' Eckersley; (substituted off) 50' Plata (substituted on) Martina; (substituted off) 58' Soolsma (substituted on) Santos; (substituted off) 71' Stevanovic (substituted on) Yourassowsky; (yellow card) 75' Martina; (yellow card) 79' Borman	Stadium: Pizza Hut Park; Attendance: 8,145; Referee: Yader Reyes

May 14, 2011	FC Dallas	2–0	Philadelphia Union	Frisco, Texas
19:30 CDT	Shea 29'; Castillo 43'; Castillo (substituted off) Luna (substituted on) 67'; Jacobson (substituted off) Warshaw (substituted on) 83'; Alexander (substituted off) Guarda (substituted on) 89'	Report	(yellow card) 10' Mwanga; (yellow card) 34' Carroll; (substituted off) 46' Mapp (substituted on) Ruiz; (substituted off) 46' Carroll (substituted on) McInerney; (substituted off) 73' Torres (substituted on) Daniel	Stadium: Pizza Hut Park; Attendance: 12,109; Referee: Jasen Anno

May 22, 2011	FC Dallas	0–0	Real Salt Lake	Frisco, Texas
18:00 CDT	Jacobson (yellow card) 53'; Castillo (substituted off) Luna (substituted on) 72'; Alexander (substituted off) Avila (substituted on) 77'; Gonçalves (substituted off) Warshaw (substituted on) 83'	Report	(yellow card) 44' Wingert; (yellow card) 58' Beckerman; (yellow card) 61' Grabavoy; (substituted off) 72' Williams (substituted on) Warner; (substituted off) 81' Alvarez (substituted on) Alexandre	Stadium: Pizza Hut Park; Attendance: 10,550; Referee: David Gantar

May 25, 2011	Seattle Sounders FC	0–1	FC Dallas	Seattle, Washington USA
21:00 CDT	Fernández (substituted off) Levesque (substituted on) 64'; Montero (substituted off) Jaqua (substituted on) 75'; Scott (yellow card) 82'; Rosales (substituted off) Neagle (substituted on) 83'	Report	18' Shea; (yellow card) 44' John; (substituted off) 64' Castillo (substituted on) Luna; (substituted off) 74' Alexander (substituted on) Warshaw; (substituted off) 89' Chávez (substituted on) Villar	Stadium: Qwest Field; Attendance: 36,026; Referee: Baldomero Toledo

May 28, 2011 Texas Derby	Houston Dynamo	2–2	FC Dallas	Houston, Texas USA
19:30 CDT	Palmer (yellow card) 30'; Weaver 42'; Sarkodie (yellow card) 56' (yellow-red card) 72'; Watson (substituted off) Clark (substituted on) 66'; Bruin (substituted off) Koke (substituted on) 75'; Taylor (substituted off) Dixon (substituted on) 84'; Clark 87'	Report	27' Jacobson; (yellow card) 46+' Loyd; (substituted off) 46' Gonçalves (substituted on) Benitez; (substituted off) 64' Alexander (substituted on) Rodriguez; 70' Ihemelu; (substituted off) 84' Castillo (substituted on) Villar; (yellow card) 91+' Shea	Stadium: Robertson Stadium; Attendance: 16,709; Referee: Terry Vaughn

June 4, 2011	FC Dallas	1–0	New England Revolution	Frisco, Texas
19:30 CDT	Loyd (yellow card) 58'; Alexander (substituted off) Rodriguez (substituted on) 67'; Chávez 69'; Castillo (substituted off) Warshaw (substituted on) 79'; Chávez (substituted off) Avila (substituted on) 89'	Report	(yellow card) 23' McCarthy; (yellow card) 45' Cochrane; (substituted off) 53' Dabo (substituted on) Phelan; (substituted off) 59' Domi (substituted on) Barnes; (substituted off) 70' McCarthy (substituted on) Nyassi; (yellow card) 89' Phelan	Stadium: Pizza Hut Park; Attendance: 10,363; Referee: Mark Kadlecik

June 12, 2011	FC Dallas	1–4	Sporting Kansas City	Frisco, Texas
18:00 CDT	Shea 32'; Loyd (yellow card) 47+'; Loyd (substituted off) Gonçalves (substituted on) 46'; Alexander (substituted off) Rodriguez (substituted on) 46'; Ihemelu (yellow card) 56'; Benitez (substituted off) Luna (substituted on) 74'; Rodriguez (yellow card) 89'	Report	(yellow card) 21' Collin; 28' 55' Zusi; (yellow card) 33' (yellow-red card) 56' Sinovic; (yellow card) 39' Stojcev; 49' Collin; (substituted off) 68' Arnaud (substituted on) Kamara; 78' Sassano; (substituted off) 78' Diop (substituted on) Cesar; (substituted off) 89' Zusi (substituted on) Bunbury	Stadium: Pizza Hut Park; Attendance: 10,450; Referee: Kevin Stott

June 18, 2011	Chivas USA	1–2	FC Dallas	Carson, California
21:30 CDT	Lahoud (yellow card) 6'; Kennedy (yellow card) 39'; Nagamura (substituted off) Zemanski (substituted on) 57'; Braun (substituted off) Bowen (substituted on) 63'; Mondaini (substituted off) Cortez (substituted on) 70'; Lahoud 71'; Elliott (yellow card) 77'	Report	22' Shea; (yellow card) 29' Shea; (substituted off) 68' Alexander (substituted on) Warshaw; (substituted off) 72' Castillo (substituted on) Gonçalves; (yellow card) 77' Chavez; (substituted off) 79' Chávez (substituted on) Galindo; 85' Gonçalves	Stadium: Home Depot Center; Attendance: 11,253; Referee: Edvin Jurisevic

June 25, 2011	FC Dallas	4–0	Portland Timbers	Frisco, Texas
19:30 CDT	Loyd 33'; John 38'; Shea 58'; Jacobson (substituted off) Warshaw (substituted on) 68'; Alexander (substituted off) Avila (substituted on) 76'; Chávez (substituted off) Luna (substituted on) 78'; Gonçalves 85'	Report	(substituted off) 46' Nagbe (substituted on) Moffat; (substituted off) 57' Alhassan (substituted on) Zizzo; (substituted off) 63' Perlaza (substituted on) Johnson	Stadium: Pizza Hut Park; Attendance: 10,470; Referee: Elias Bazakos

July 2, 2011 Pioneer Cup	FC Dallas	2–0	Columbus Crew	Frisco, Texas
20:00 CDT	Gonçalves (yellow card) 24'; Ihemelu (yellow card) 29'; Shea 58'; Alexander (substituted off) Villar (substituted on) 60'; Gonçalves 76'; Chávez (substituted off) Rodriguez (substituted on) 83'; Loyd (substituted off) Wiedeman (substituted on) 89'	Report	(yellow card) 7' Hesmer; (yellow card) 20' Ekpo; (substituted off) 60' Gardner (substituted on) Rogers; (substituted off) 65' Heinemann (substituted on) Cunningham; (substituted off) 69' Balchan (substituted on) O'Rourke; (yellow card) 57' (yellow-red card) 82' Iro	Stadium: Pizza Hut Park; Attendance: 20,704; Referee: Mark Declouet

July 9, 2011	Real Salt Lake	2–0	FC Dallas	Sandy, Utah
20:00 CDT	Beckerman (yellow card) 29'; Williams 47'; Olave (yellow card) 67'; Rimando (yellow card) 93+'; Espindola 94+'	Report	(yellow card) 37' Gonçalves; (yellow card) 71' Shea; (yellow card) 90' Warshaw	Stadium: Rio Tinto Stadium; Attendance: 17,734; Referee: Ricardo Salazar

July 16, 2011	FC Dallas	0–0	D.C. United	Frisco, Texas
20:00 CDT	Hernandez (yellow card) 58'	Report	(yellow card) 26' White	Stadium: Pizza Hut Park; Attendance: 10,802; Referee: Niko Bratsis

July 20, 2011	Toronto FC	0–1	FC Dallas	Toronto, Ontario Canada
19:00 CDT	Viator (yellow card) 15'; Iro (yellow card) 77'	Report	(yellow card) 40' Gonçalves; 48' Shea; (yellow card) 88' Hernandez	Stadium: BMO Field; Attendance: 21,087; Referee: Hilario Grajeda

July 23, 2011	New York Red Bulls	2–2	FC Dallas	New York City USA
17:00 CDT	Agudelo 39'; Ream (yellow card) 59'; Richards (yellow card) 50' (yellow-red card) 80'; Henry 85'	Report	51' 78' Chávez; (yellow card) 79' Guarda; (yellow card) 83' Jacobson	Stadium: Red Bull Arena; Attendance: 17,276; Referee: Jorge Gonzalez

July 31, 2011	FC Dallas	1–0	Chivas USA	Frisco, Texas
18:00 CDT	Chávez 26'; Warshaw (yellow card) 49'; Guarda (yellow card) 53'	Report	Valentin (yellow card) 16'	Stadium: Pizza Hut Park; Attendance: 10,023; Referee: Elias Bazakos

August 6, 2011	Los Angeles Galaxy	3–1	FC Dallas	Carson, California
21:30 CDT	Beckham (yellow card) 25'; Gonzalez 32'; Berhalter (yellow card) 35'; Juninho 62'; Magee 81'; Stephens (yellow card) 94+'	Report	Chávez 9'; Villar (yellow card) 18'; Benitez (yellow card) 27'; Chávez (yellow card) 68'	Stadium: Home Depot Center; Attendance: 21,546; Referee: Michael Kennedy

August 13, 2011	Philadelphia Union	2–2	FC Dallas	Chester, Pennsylvania
18:30 CDT	Adu (yellow card) 27'; Le Toux 33' (pen.); McInerney (yellow card) 68'; Le Toux 84' (pen.)	Report	Santos 16'; John (yellow card) 24'; Shea 47+'; Santos (yellow card) 56'; John (yellow card) 80'	Stadium: PPL Park; Attendance: 18,811; Referee: Geoff Gamble

August 20, 2011	FC Dallas	0–1	Seattle Sounders FC	Frisco, Texas
18:30 CDT	Cruz (yellow card) 3' (yellow card) 56' (red card); Ihemelu (yellow card) 27'	Report	Friberg (yellow card) 6'; Rosales 15'; Montero (yellow card) 60'; Hurtado (yellow card) 62'; Scott (yellow card) 92+'	Stadium: Pizza Hut Park; Attendance: 11,635; Referee: David Gantar

August 27, 2011	Sporting Kansas City	2–3	FC Dallas	Kansas City, Kansas
19:30 CDT	Bunbury (yellow card) 16'; Kamara 28'; Myers (yellow card) 36'; Bravo 68'; Bunbury (yellow card) 76'	Report	Benitez (yellow card) 36'; Shea (yellow card) 51'; Ihemelu 70'; Ihemelu (yellow card) 81'; Santos 89'; Hernández (yellow card) 90'; Warshaw 91+'	Stadium: Livestrong Sporting Park; Attendance: 20,018; Referee: Chris Penso

September 10, 2011	New England Revolution	2–0	FC Dallas	Foxborough, Massachusetts
18:30 CDT	Joseph 14'; Lekic 84'; Guy (yellow card) 93+'	Report	Shea (yellow card) 25'; Villar (yellow card) 74'	Stadium: Gillette Stadium; Attendance: 15,498; Referee: Baldomero Toledo

September 17, 2011	FC Dallas	0–1	New York Red Bulls	Frisco, Texas
19:30 CDT		Report	Rogers 36'; Richards (yellow card) 70'; Lindpere (yellow card) 75'; Ballouchy (yellow card) 85'	Stadium: Pizza Hut Park; Attendance: 17,019; Referee: Jair Marrufo

September 24, 2011 Texas Derby	FC Dallas	0–1	Houston Dynamo	Frisco, Texas
15:00 CDT	Ihemelu (yellow card) 33'	Report	Boswell (yellow card) 26'; Cameron 87'	Stadium: Pizza Hut Park; Attendance: 10,849; Referee: Ricardo Salazar

October 1, 2011	Colorado Rapids	1–0	FC Dallas	Commerce City, Colorado
20:00 CDT	Moor 25'; Comminges (yellow card) 62'; Comminges (yellow card) 74'; Moor (yellow card) 80'	Report	Jackson (yellow card) 30'; Hernández (yellow card) 39'	Stadium: Dick's Sporting Goods Park; Attendance: 13,920; Referee: Silviu Petrescu

October 12, 2011 Brimstone Cup	Chicago Fire	1–2	FC Dallas	Bridgeview, Illinois
19:30 CDT	Segares (yellow card) 18'; Gargan (yellow card) 39'; Pardo (yellow card) 78'; Gibbs (yellow card) 82'; Grazzini 85'; Mikulic (yellow card) 90'	Report	Loyd (yellow card) 29'; Jackson 41'; Jackson (yellow card) 43'; Cruz 52'; Cruz (yellow card) 58'	Stadium: Toyota Park; Attendance: 10,362; Referee: Michael Kennedy

October 15, 2011	FC Dallas	2–0	Vancouver Whitecaps FC	Frisco, Texas
19:30 CDT	Chávez 35'; Chávez (yellow card) 38'; Shea 54'; Jackson (yellow card) 77'	Report		Stadium: Pizza Hut Park; Attendance: 10,222; Referee: Alex Prus

October 22, 2011	San Jose Earthquakes	4–2	FC Dallas	Santa Clara, California
21:30 CDT				Stadium: Buck Shaw Stadium; Attendance: 10,744

=== MLS Cup playoffs ===
October 26, 2011 Wild-card game	FC Dallas	0–2	New York Red Bulls	Frisco, Texas
20:00 CDT	Ihemelu (yellow card) 31'; Hernandez (yellow card) 51'	Report	Ream (yellow card) 27'; Lindpere 61'; Solli (red card) 79'; Henry 90+8'	Stadium: Pizza Hut Park; Attendance: 10,017; Referee: Ricardo Salazar

=== CONCACAF Champions League ===
By being a finalist in the 2010 MLS Cup final, Dallas secured a preliminary-round spot in the CONCACAF Champions League. It will be Dallas's debut in the Champions League as well as any CONCACAF club competition. On May 18, 2011 at the CONCACAF draw in New York City, it was revealed that Dallas would play Salvadorian finalists Alianza.

==== Preliminary stage ====
July 28, 2011	Alianza (El Salvador)	0–1	(United States) FC Dallas	San Salvador, El Salvador
21:00 CDT	Castillo (yellow card) 37'; Rivas (yellow card) 42'; Sosa (yellow card) 58'; Rivas (substituted off) Amaya (substituted on) 61'; Salazar (substituted off) Ayala (substituted on) 70'; Leonardo (substituted off) Burgos (substituted on) 86'	Report	(yellow card) 8' Guarda; (yellow card) 45' Chávez; 70' Jackson; (substituted off) 71' Guarda (substituted on) Jacobson; (substituted off) 75' Villar (substituted on) Alexander; (substituted off) 90' Chávez (substituted on) Warshaw	Stadium: Estadio Cuscatlán; Referee: David Gantar (Canada)

August 3, 2011	FC Dallas (United States)	1–0 (2–0 agg.)	(El Salvador) Alianza	Frisco, Texas
19:00 CDT	Ihemelu 37'		(yellow card) 35' Burgos	Stadium: Pizza Hut Park; Referee: Enrico Wijngaarde (Suriname)

==== Group stage ====
August 17, 2011	UNAM Pumas (Mexico)	0–1	(United States) FC Dallas	Estadio Olímpico Universitario, Mexico City, Mexico
21:00 CDT	Gámez (yellow card) 45'; Sandoval (yellow card) 58'	Report	(yellow card) 61' Jackson; 66' Chávez; (yellow card) 85' Loyd	Attendance: ~12,000; Referee: José Molina (Honduras)

August 24, 2011	Toronto FC (Canada)	0–1	(United States) FC Dallas	BMO Field, Toronto, Ontario, Canada
19:00 CDT		Report	Stewart 45+1'	Attendance: 500; Referee: Javier Santos (Puerto Rico)

September 14, 2011	FC Dallas (United States)	1–1	(Panama) Tauro F.C.	Pizza Hut Park, Frisco
19:00 CDT

September 20, 2011	FC Dallas (United States)	0–2	(Mexico) UNAM Pumas	Pizza Hut Park, Frisco
19:00 CDT

September 27, 2011	Tauro F.C. (Panama)	5–3	(United States) FC Dallas	Cancha Sintetica Rommel Fernández, Panama City, Panama
19:00 CDT

October 18, 2011	FC Dallas (United States)	0–3	(Canada) Toronto FC	Pizza Hut Park, Frisco
19:00 CDT

=== U.S. Open Cup ===
FC Dallas secured a third round entry into the U.S. Open Cup by finishing in the top 6 during the 2010 MLS regular season. On June 16, 2011 it was announced that FC Dallas will face the winner of the second round match between Orlando City S.C. and Charleston Battery on June 21, 2011. Orlando City S.C. defeated the Charleston Battery 1–0 to earn a place in the third round.

June 28, 2011 Third round	FC Dallas (Texas)	3–2	(Florida) Orlando City	Frisco, Texas
20:00	Jackson 39'; Jacobson (substituted off) Alexander (substituted on) 46'; Villar 50'; Luna (substituted off) Rodriguez (substituted on) 52'; Loyd (substituted off) Guarda (substituted on) 68'; Rodriguez 90+'	Report	24' Griffin; (yellow card) 59' Mechack; (yellow card) 61' Griffin; (yellow card) 68' Traynor; (substituted off) 69' Traynor (substituted on) Watson; (yellow card) 72' Watson; (substituted off) 79' Molino (substituted on) Chin; 90+' Álvarez	Stadium: Pizza Hut Park; Attendance: 1,876; Referee: Armando Villarreal

July 12, 2011 Quarterfinals	FC Dallas (Texas)	2–0	(Utah) Real Salt Lake	Frisco, Texas
20:00	Benitez 18'; Benitez (yellow card) 37'; Loyd (yellow card) 45+'; Jackson 54'; Wiedeman (yellow card) 87'	Report	(yellow card) 14' Espindola; (yellow card) 40' Olave	Stadium: Pizza Hut Park; Referee: Michael Kennedy

August 30, 2011 Semifinals	Seattle Sounders FC (Washington (state))	1–0	(Texas) FC Dallas	Tukwila, Washington
				Stadium: Starfire Sports Complex

== Statistics ==
All statistics are for competitive matches only.

=== Appearances and goals ===
No.	Pos	Nat	Player	Total		MLS		Champions League		Open Cup	
No.	Pos	Nat	Player	Apps	Goals	Apps	Goals	Apps	Goals	Apps	Goals
1	GK	(United States) USA	Kevin Hartman	25	0	22+0	0	1+0	0	2+0	0
2	MF	(United States) USA	Daniel Hernández	22	1	21+0	1	1+0	0	0+0	0
3	DF	(United States) USA	Ugo Ihemelu	24	2	20+1	2	1+0	0	2+0	0
4	MF	(United States) USA	Andrew Jacobson	21	1	16+3	1	0+1	0	1+0	0
5	DF	(Colombia) COL	Jair Benitez	18	1	13+2	0	1+0	0	2+0	1
6	MF	(Brazil) BRA	Jackson	21	6	15+3	3	1+0	1	1+1	2
7	FW	(Colombia) COL	Milton Rodriguez	14	2	5+8	1	0+0	0	0+1	1
8	MF	(Brazil) BRA	Bruno Guarda	8	0	0+5	0	1+0	0	1+1	0
10	MF	(Colombia) COL	David Ferreira	6	3	6+0	3	0+0	0	0+0	0
11	MF	(Brazil) BRA	Ricardo Villar	12	1	4+5	0	1+0	0	2+0	1
12	MF	(United States) USA	Eric Avila	14	1	5+8	1	0+0	0	1+0	0
13	FW	(Cuba) CUB	Maykel Galindo	2	0	0+2	0	0+0	0	0+0	0
14	DF	(United States) USA	George John	23	2	21+0	2	1+0	0	1+0	0
15	FW	(Colombia) COL	Fabian Castillo	15	2	14+1	2	0+0	0	0+0	0
16	DF	(United States) USA	Bobby Warshaw	14	0	2+9	0	0+1	0	2+0	0
17	FW	(United States) USA	Peri Marošević	0	0	0+0	0	0+0	0	0+0	0
18	FW	(Honduras) HON	Marvin Chávez	24	3	22+0	3	1+0	0	1+0	0
19	DF	(United States) USA	Zach Loyd	23	1	18+2	1	1+0	0	2+0	0
20	MF	(United States) USA	Brek Shea	24	9	21+0	9	1+0	0	1+1	0
21	MF	(Mexico) MEX	Bryan Leyva	0	0	0+0	0	0+0	0	0+0	0
22	GK	(United States) USA	Josh Lambo	0	0	0+0	0	0+0	0	0+0	0
23	FW	(United States) USA	Andrew Wiedeman	4	0	0+2	0	0+0	0	1+1	0
24	MF	(United States) USA	Eric Alexander	23	0	16+4	0	0+1	0	1+1	0
27	DF	(Canada) CAN	Edson Edward	0	0	0+0	0	0+0	0	0+0	0
28	MF	(United States) USA	Victor Ulloa	0	0	0+0	0	0+0	0	0+0	0
29	DF	(United States) USA	Moises Hernandez	0	0	0+0	0	0+0	0	0+0	0
30	GK	(United States) USA	Chris Seitz	0	0	0+0	0	0+0	0	0+0	0
32	FW	(United States) USA	Jonathan Top	0	0	0+0	0	0+0	0	0+0	0
34	FW	(Mexico) MEX	Rubén Luna	12	0	1+10	0	0+0	0	1+0	0
40	GK	(Mexico) MEX	Richard Sánchez	0	0	0+0	0	0+0	0	0+0	0

Updated to match played July 25, 2011
Source: FC Dallas

=== Goalkeeper stats ===
No.	Nat.	Player	Total			MLS			Champions League			Open Cup		
No.	Nat.	Player	MIN	GA	GAA	MIN	GA	GAA	MIN	GA	GAA	MIN	GA	GAA
12	(United States)	Kevin Hartman	2160	23	0.96	1980	21	0.95	90	0	0.00	180	2	1.00
		TOTALS	2160	23	0.96	1980	21	0.95	0	0	0	180	2	1.00

Updated to match played July 25, 2011
Source: FC Dallas

=== Top scorers ===
Rank	Nation	Number	Name	Total	MLS	Champions League	Open Cup
1	(United States)	20	Brek Shea	9	9	0	0
2	(Brazil)	6	Jackson	6	3	1	2
3	(Honduras)	18	Marvin Chávez	3	3	0	0
3	(Colombia)	10	David Ferreira	3	3	0	0
5	(United States)	3	Ugo Ihemelu	2	2	0	0
5	(Colombia)	15	Fabian Castillo	2	2	0	0
5	(United States)	14	George John	2	2	0	0
5	(Colombia)	9	Milton Rodriguez	2	1	0	1
9	(United States)	12	Eric Avila	1	1	0	0
9	(United States)	2	Daniel Hernandez	1	1	0	0
9	(United States)	4	Andrew Jacobson	1	1	0	0
9	(United States)	19	Zach Loyd	1	1	0	0
9	(Brazil)	11	Ricardo Villar	1	0	0	1
9	(Colombia)	5	Jair Benitez	1	0	0	1

Updated to match played July 25, 2011
Source: FC Dallas

=== Top assists ===
Rank	Nation	Number	Name	Total	MLS	Champions League	Open Cup
1	(United States)	4	Andrew Jacobson	5	5	0	0
2	(Honduras)	18	Marvin Chávez	4	4	0	0
3	(Colombia)	15	Fabian Castillo	3	3	0	0
3	(United States)	2	Daniel Hernandez	3	3	0	0
3	(Brazil)	11	Ricardo Villar	3	1	1	1
5	(Brazil)	6	Jackson	2	2	0	0
5	(United States)	19	Zach Loyd	2	2	0	0
5	(Colombia)	5	Jair Benitez	2	2	0	0
9	(United States)	12	Eric Avila	1	1	0	0
9	(United States)	20	Brek Shea	1	1	0	0
9	(Colombia)	10	David Ferreira	1	1	0	0
9	(Colombia)	7	Milton Rodriguez	1	1	0	0
9	(Brazil)	8	Bruno Guarda	1	1	0	0
9	(United States)	14	George John	1	1	0	0
9	(United States)	24	Eric Alexander	1	0	0	1

Updated to match played July 25, 2011
Source: FC Dallas

=== Disciplinary record ===
Position	Nation	Number	Name	Total		MLS		Champions League		Open Cup	
Position	Nation	Number	Name	Booked	Sent off (straight red)	Booked	Sent off (straight red)	Booked	Sent off (straight red)	Booked	Sent off (straight red)
MF	(Brazil)	6	Jackson	5	1	5	1	0	0	0	0
MF	(United States)	20	Brek Shea	4	1	4	1	0	0	0	0
DF	(United States)	19	Zach Loyd	4	0	3	0	0	0	1	0
MF	(United States)	4	Andrew Jacobson	4	0	4	0	0	0	0	0
MF	(United States)	2	Daniel Hernández	3	0	3	0	0	0	0	0
DF	(United States)	14	George John	3	0	3	0	0	0	0	0
DF	(United States)	3	Ugo Ihemelu	3	0	3	0	0	0	0	0
MF	(Honduras)	18	Marvin Chávez	2	0	2	0	0	0	0	0
FW	(Mexico)	34	Rubén Luna	1	0	1	0	0	0	0	0
FW	(Colombia)	7	Milton Rodriguez	1	0	1	0	0	0	0	0
DF	(United States)	16	Bobby Warshaw	1	0	1	0	0	0	0	0
MF	(Brazil)	8	Bruno Guarda	1	0	1	0	0	0	0	0
DF	(Colombia)	5	Jair Benitez	1	0	0	0	0	0	1	0
MF	(United States)	23	Andrew Wiedeman	1	0	0	0	0	0	1	0
			TOTALS	34	2	31	2	0	0	3	0

Updated to match played July 25, 2011
Source: FC Dallas

== Recognition ==
=== MLS W.O.R.K.S. Humanitarian of the Month ===
Month
Month	Player	Link
April	(United States) Daniel Hernández	April Humanitarian

=== MLS Player of the Week ===
Week	Player	Week's Statline
Week 4	(Colombia) David Ferreira	2 Goals (40',46')

=== AT&T Goal of the Week ===
Week	Player	Link
Week 7	(United States) Brek Shea	Week 7

=== MLS All-Stars 2011 ===
Position	Player	Note
MF	(United States) Brek Shea	First XI

== Miscellany ==
=== Allocation ranking ===
FC Dallas is in the No. 11 position in the MLS Allocation Ranking. The allocation ranking is the mechanism used to determine which MLS club has first priority to acquire a U.S. National Team player who signs with MLS after playing abroad, or a former MLS player who returns to the league after having gone to a club abroad for a transfer fee. A ranking can be traded, provided that part of the compensation received in return is another club's ranking.

=== International roster spots ===
FC Dallas has 9 international roster spots. Each club in Major League Soccer is allocated 8 international roster spots, which can be traded. The club acquired an additional spot from Toronto FC on August 2, 2011 for use during the remainder of the 2011 season only. There is no limit on the number of international slots on each club's roster. The remaining roster slots must belong to domestic players. For clubs based in the United States, a domestic player is either a U.S. citizen, a permanent resident (green card holder) or the holder of other special status (e.g., refugee or asylum status).

=== Future draft pick trades ===
Future picks acquired: 2012 SuperDraft conditional pick acquired from Colorado Rapids.
Future picks traded: 2012 SuperDraft Round 2 pick traded to Sporting Kansas City; 2012 SuperDraft Round 4 pick traded to Seattle Sounders FC; 2012 Supplemental Draft Round 1 pick traded to Chivas USA; 2013 SuperDraft Round 2 pick traded to Philadelphia Union.
