= 2009 FC Dallas season =

FC Dallas
2009 season
- Owner: Clark Hunt
- Head coach: Schellas Hyndman
- Major League Soccer: 11th
- MLS Cup: Did not qualify
- U.S. Open Cup: Did not qualify
- Texas Derby: Runners-Up
- Brimstone Cup: Champions
- Highest home attendance: 51,012 vs. New England Revolution (September 30, 2009)
- Lowest home attendance: 5,724 vs. San Jose Earthquakes (June 7, 2009)
- Average home league attendance: 9,883
Home colors	Away colors

The 2009 FC Dallas season was the fourteenth season of the team's existence. It began on March 21 with a 3–1 home loss to the Chicago Fire and ended with a 2–1 away loss to Seattle Sounders FC on October 24. A win in that game would have sent the team to the playoffs.

== Squad ==
=== First-team squad ===
As of June 20, 2009. Note: Flags indicate national team as defined under FIFA eligibility rules; some limited exceptions apply. Players may hold more than one non-FIFA nationality.

No.	Pos.	Nation	Player
3	DF	USA	Ugo Ihemelu
4	DF	CRC	Daniel Torres
5	DF	COL	Jair Benitez (on loan from Deportivo Cali)
6	MF	ARG	Pablo Ricchetti (captain)
7	MF	NED	Dave van den Bergh
8	MF	BRA	Bruno Guarda
9	FW	USA	Jeff Cunningham
10	FW	COL	David Ferreira (on loan from At. Paranaense)
11	MF	BRA	André Rocha (on loan from At. Paranaense)
12	MF	USA	Eric Avila
13	MF	USA	Dax McCarty
14	MF	USA	George John

No.	Pos.	Nation	Player
15	DF	USA	Kyle Davies
16	FW	SKN	Atiba Harris
17	MF	HON	Marvin Chávez (on loan from Marathón)
18	FW	USA	Perica Marošević
19	DF	USA	Blake Wagner
20	FW	USA	Brek Shea
21	MF	CRC	Álvaro Sánchez (on loan from San Carlos)
22	GK	USA	Josh Lambo
25	DF	USA	Steve Purdy
26	DF	USA	Anthony Wallace
30	GK	USA	Ray Burse
44	GK	ARG	Darío Sala

== Club ==
=== Management ===
Position	Staff
General Manager	(United States) Michael Hitchcock
Head Coach	(United States) Schellas Hyndman
Assistant Coach	(United States) John Ellinger
Assistant Coach	(United States) Marco Ferruzzi
Goalkeeper Coach	(Republic of Ireland) Drew Keeshan
Head Athletic Trainer	(United States) Joshua Watts
Equipment Manager	(United States) Marcus Owens

Last updated: April 18, 2009
Source: FC Dallas

=== Other information ===
Owner	(United States) Clark Hunt
Ground (capacity and dimensions)	Pizza Hut Park (20,500 / N/A)

Source: FC Dallas

== Competitions ==
=== Overall ===
Competition	Started round	Current position / round	Final position / round	First match	Last match
MLS	—	—		March 21, 2009	

Updated to match played April 15, 2008
Source: Competitions

=== Major League Soccer ===
==== Standings ====
Pos	Team	Pld	W	L	T	GF	GA	GD	Pts	Qualification
1	LA Galaxy	30	12	6	12	36	31	+5	48	MLS Cup Playoffs
2	Houston Dynamo	30	13	8	9	39	29	+10	48	MLS Cup Playoffs
3	Seattle Sounders FC	30	12	7	11	38	29	+9	47	MLS Cup Playoffs
4	Chivas USA	30	13	11	6	34	31	+3	45	MLS Cup Playoffs
5	Real Salt Lake	30	11	12	7	43	35	+8	40	MLS Cup Playoffs
6	Colorado Rapids	30	10	10	10	42	38	+4	40	
7	FC Dallas	30	11	13	6	50	47	+3	39	
8	San Jose Earthquakes	30	7	14	9	36	50	−14	30	

Source: MLS

Pos	Team	Pld	W	L	T	GF	GA	GD	Pts	Qualification
1	Columbus Crew (S)	30	13	7	10	41	31	+10	49	CONCACAF Champions League
2	LA Galaxy	30	12	6	12	36	31	+5	48	CONCACAF Champions League
3	Houston Dynamo	30	13	8	9	39	29	+10	48	North American SuperLiga
4	Seattle Sounders FC	30	12	7	11	38	29	+9	47	CONCACAF Champions League
5	Chicago Fire	30	11	7	12	39	34	+5	45	North American SuperLiga
6	Chivas USA	30	13	11	6	34	31	+3	45	North American SuperLiga
7	New England Revolution	30	11	10	9	33	37	−4	42	North American SuperLiga
8	Real Salt Lake (C)	30	11	12	7	43	35	+8	40	CONCACAF Champions League
9	Colorado Rapids	30	10	10	10	42	38	+4	40	
10	D.C. United	30	9	8	13	43	44	−1	40	
11	FC Dallas	30	11	13	6	50	47	+3	39	
12	Toronto FC	30	10	11	9	37	46	−9	39	CONCACAF Champions League
13	Kansas City Wizards	30	8	13	9	33	42	−9	33	
14	San Jose Earthquakes	30	7	14	9	36	50	−14	30	
15	New York Red Bulls	30	5	19	6	27	47	−20	21	

Source: MLS
Rules for classification: 1) points; 2) head-to-head record; 3) goal difference; 4) number of goals scored
(C) Champions; (S) Supporters' Shield

==== Results summary ====
Overall								Home						Away					
Pld	Pts	W	L	T	GF	GA	GD	W	L	T	GF	GA	GD	W	L	T	GF	GA	GD
30	39	11	13	6	50	47	+3	8	3	4	28	19	+9	3	10	2	22	28	−6

Last updated: October 24, 2009
Source: Major League Soccer
Pld = Matches played; Pts = Points; W = Matches won; T = Matches tied; L = Matches lost; GF = Goals for; GA = Goals against; GD = Goal difference

Round	1	2	3	4	5	6	7	8	9	10	11	12	13	14	15	16	17	18	19	20	21	22	23	24	25	26	27	28	29	30
Stadium	H	H	A	A	H	A	A	A	H	H	A	H	H	H	A	H	A	A	H	H	A	A	H	A	A	H	H	A	H	A
Result	L	L	L	T	W	L	L	L	T	T	W	T	L	W	T	W	L	L	W	W	L	L	T	W	L	W	W	W	W	L

Updated to match(es) played on October 24, 2009. Source: FC Dallas
A = Away; H = Home; W = Win; L = Loss; T = Tie

== Matches ==
Win Tie Loss

=== MLS ===
March 21, 2009 1 Brimstone Cup	Chicago Fire	3–1	FC Dallas	Frisco, Texas
	Mapp 38'; Soumare (yellow card) 39'; McBride 51'; Thorrington (yellow card) 52'; Pappa (yellow card) 69'; Blonco 94+'	Report	Ferreira (yellow card) 5'; Cooper 9'	Stadium: Pizza Hut Park; Attendance: 15,905; Referee: Baldomero Toledo

March 29, 2009 2	Chivas USA	2–0	FC Dallas	Frisco, Texas
	Lillingston 56'; Trujillo (yellow card) 70'; Stepanovic 75'	Report	Pitchkolan (yellow card) 68'	Stadium: Pizza Hut Park; Attendance: 6,542; Referee: Paul Ward

April 4, 2009 3	FC Dallas	1–2	New England Revolution	Foxborough, Massachusetts
	Rocha (yellow card) 33'; Cooper 38'; John (yellow card) 79'	Report	Larentowicz (yellow card) 31'; Mansally (yellow card) 34'; Nyassi 56'; Ralston 80' (pen.)	Stadium: Gillette Stadium; Attendance: 11,314; Referee: Silviu Petrescu

April 11, 2009 4	FC Dallas	1–1	Toronto FC	Toronto, Ontario Canada
	Cunningham (yellow card) 80'; Ricchetti 87'	Report	De Rosario 17'; Dichio (yellow card) 82'; Brennan (yellow card) 89'	Stadium: BMO Field; Attendance: 20,272; Referee: Terry Vaughn

April 19, 2009 5	Toronto FC	2–3	FC Dallas	Frisco, Texas
	Serioux 46+'; Barrett 59'; Barrett (yellow card) 70'	Report	Moor 25'; Cooper 44', 84' (pen.)	Stadium: Pizza Hut Park; Attendance: 6,183; Referee: Tim Weyland

April 25, 2009 6	FC Dallas	0–2	Chivas USA	Carson, California
	Sala (red card) 25'; Saragosa (yellow card) 60'	Report	Harris (yellow card) 1' (yellow-red card) 89'; Chijindu (yellow card) 32'; Harris 68'; Eskandarian 91+'	Stadium: The Home Depot Center; Attendance: 14,611; Referee: Abiodun Okulaja

May 2, 2009 7	FC Dallas	1–2	D.C. United	Washington, D.C. USA
	Rocha 28'; Cooper (yellow card) 45'	Report	Moreno 56', 66'; Jakovic (yellow card) 62'	Stadium: Robert F. Kennedy Memorial Stadium; Attendance: 14,225; Referee: Ricardo Salazar

May 9, 2009 8 Texas Derby	FC Dallas	0–1	Houston Dynamo	Houston, Texas
	Wagner (yellow card) 31'; Ferreira (yellow card) 62'; Cooper (yellow card) 75'	Report	Kamara 58'; Davis (yellow card) 62'	Stadium: Robertson Stadium; Attendance: 16,932; Referee: Kevin Stott

May 16, 2009 9	Seattle Sounders FC	1–1	FC Dallas	Frisco, Texas
19:30 CDT	Hurtado 18'; Zakuani (yellow card) 48+'; Marshall (yellow card) 64'	Report	Rocha (yellow card) 20'; Rocha 48+'; Saragosa (yellow card) 75'; Guarda (yellow card) 80'	Stadium: Pizza Hut Park; Attendance: 8,247; Referee: Terry Vaughn

May 23, 2009 10	Los Angeles Galaxy	1–1	FC Dallas	Frisco, Texas
	Donovan 3'; Lewis (yellow card) 26'; Gonzalez (yellow card) 33'; Tudela (yellow card) 42'	Report	Saragosa (red card) 25'; Moor 31'; Ricchetti (yellow card) 32'; Rocha (yellow card) 41'; Guarda (yellow card) 74'	Stadium: Pizza Hut Park; Attendance: 9,595; Referee: Paul Ward

May 31, 2009 11 Brimstone Cup	FC Dallas	3–0	Chicago Fire	Bridgeview, Illinois
	Cunningham 15'; Brown 35' (o.g.); Torres (yellow card) 48'; Cunningham (yellow card) 54'; Ricchetti (yellow card) 58'; Cooper 80'	Report	Rolfe (yellow card) 28'; Ward (yellow card) 34'; Soumare (yellow card) 66' (yellow-red card) 79'	Stadium: Toyota Park; Attendance: 13,120; Referee: Shane Moody

June 7, 2009 12	San Jose Earthquakes	2–2	FC Dallas	Frisco, Texas
	Campos (yellow card) 25'; Ricchetti 60' (o.g.); Alvarez 82'	Report	Saragosa (yellow card) 16'; Ferreira 29'; Moor (yellow card) 70'; Cooper 87'	Stadium: Pizza Hut Park; Attendance: 5,724; Referee: Tim Weyland

June 13, 2009 13 Texas Derby	Houston Dynamo	3–1	FC Dallas	Frisco, Texas
	Weaver 12', 63'; Mulrooney 37'	Report	Rocha (yellow card) 40'; Moor 67'	Stadium: Pizza Hut Park; Attendance: 8,580; Referee: Mark Geiger

June 20, 2009 14 Pioneer Cup	Columbus Crew	1–2	FC Dallas	Frisco, Texas
	Ricchetti 14' (o.g.); Padula (yellow card) 41'; Schelotto (yellow card) 68'; Marshall (yellow card) 86'	Report	Moor (yellow card) 32'; Avila 80'; Cooper 87' (pen.)	Stadium: Pizza Hut Park; Attendance: 8,041; Referee: Terry Vaughn

June 24, 2009 15	FC Dallas	1–1	Colorado Rapids	Commerce City, Colorado
	Ferreira 37'	Report	Cummings 84'	Stadium: Dick's Sporting Goods Park; Attendance: 10,583; Referee: Jair Marrufo

July 4, 2009 16	New York Red Bulls	1–2	FC Dallas	Frisco, Texas
	Angel 43'	Report	Cunningham 15', 17'; Ricchetti (yellow card) 74'	Stadium: Pizza Hut Park; Attendance: 14,327; Referee: Kevin Stott

July 11, 2009 17	FC Dallas	0–1	Colorado Rapids	Commerce City, Colorado
		Report	Ihemelu (yellow card) 13'; LaBrocca (yellow card) 17'; Kimura 79'; Ballouchy (yellow card) 84'; Dalby (yellow card) 89'	Stadium: Dick's Sporting Goods Park; Attendance: 8,128; Referee: Yader Reyes

July 24, 2009 18	FC Dallas	2–4	Real Salt Lake	Sandy, Utah
	Cunningham 13' van den Bergh 21' van den Bergh (yellow card) 61'; Burse (yellow card) 62'; Ricchetti (yellow card) 78'; Moor (red card) 95+'	Report	Espindola (yellow card) 29'; Borchers (yellow card) 35'; Movsisyan 55'; Findley 62' (pen.); Johnson (yellow card) 72'; Olave (yellow card) 77'; Torres 82' (o.g.); Movsisyan 91+'	Stadium: Rio Tinto Stadium; Attendance: 18,822; Referee: Ricardo Salazar

August 1, 2009 19	Kansas City Wizards	0–6	FC Dallas	Frisco, Texas
	Arnaud (yellow card) 49'; Wolff (yellow card) 62'; López (red card) 68'	Report	Cunningham 39', 66' (pen.), 75', 89'; Ferreira 42', 78'	Stadium: Pizza Hut Park; Attendance: 10,317; Referee: Andrew Chapin

August 6, 2009 20 Texas Derby	Houston Dynamo	0–1	FC Dallas	Frisco, Texas
	Boswell (yellow card) 12'; Onstad (yellow card) 16'; Kamara (yellow card) 56'; James (yellow card) 85'	Report	Cunningham 20'; Ricchetti (yellow card) 22'; Harris (yellow card) 36'; Sala (yellow card) 84'	Stadium: Pizza Hut Park; Attendance: 7,442; Referee: Baldomero Toledo

August 15, 2009 21 Pioneer Cup	FC Dallas	0–2	Columbus Crew	Columbus, Ohio
	Benitez (yellow card) 52'	Report	Marshall 10'; O'Rourke (yellow card) 66'; Gaven 87'	Stadium: Columbus Crew Stadium; Attendance: 19,115; Referee: Edvin Jurisevic

August 23, 2009 22	FC Dallas	2–3	New York Red Bulls	East Rutherford, New Jersey
	McCarty 19'; Ricchetti (yellow card) 56' van den Bergh 72'	Report	Angel 4'; Richards 27'; Wolyniec (yellow card) 55'; Goldthwaite (red card) 60'; Hall (yellow card) 86'; Angel 88'; Stammler (yellow card) 90+1'; Kandji (yellow card) 90+2'	Stadium: Giants Stadium; Attendance: 9,648; Referee: Jasen Anno

September 5, 2009 23	D.C. United	2–2	FC Dallas	Frisco, Texas
	McTavish (yellow card) 35'; Burch 44'; Moreno 58'; Burch (yellow card) 70'; Silva (yellow card) 93+'		Cunningham 18'; Ferreira 50'; Torres (red card) 57' van der Bergh (yellow card) 62'; McCarty (yellow card) 77'; Benitez (yellow card) 93+'	Stadium: Pizza Hut Park; Attendance: 10,219; Referee: Ricardo Salazar

September 12, 2009 24	FC Dallas	6–3	Los Angeles Galaxy	Carson, California
	van den Bergh 8'; Cunningham 25', 86'; Ferreira (yellow card) 31'; Ihemelu (yellow card) 33'; McCarty 71'; Harris 82'; Ferreira 83'	Report	Berhalter (yellow card) 6'; Benitez 26' (o.g.); DeLaGarza 42'; Buddle 90'	Stadium: The Home Depot Center; Attendance: 18,148; Referee: Hilario Grajeda

September 19, 2009 25	FC Dallas	2–3	Kansas City Wizards	Kansas City, Kansas
	Chavez (yellow card) 13'; McCarty 44'; McCarty (yellow card) 45'; Cunningham 54'; Ricchetti (yellow card) 89'	Report	Hirsig 9'; Morsink (yellow card) 19'; Wolff 77'; Conrad 80'; López (yellow card) 93+'	Stadium: CommunityAmerica Ballpark; Attendance: 10,385; Referee: Jeff Gontarek

September 26, 2009 26	Real Salt Lake	0–3	FC Dallas	Frisco, Texas
	Movsisyan (yellow card) 79'; Williams (yellow card) 84'	Report	Cunningham 5', 87'; Ferreira 10'	Stadium: Pizza Hut Park; Referee: Kevin Stott

September 30, 2009 27	New England Revolution	0–1	FC Dallas	Dallas, Texas
	Videira (yellow card) 26'; Osei (yellow card) 51'; Thompson (red card) 91+'	Report	Harris (yellow card) 59'; Cunningham 71'; Rocha (yellow card) 88' (yellow-red card) 91+'	Stadium: Cotton Bowl; Attendance: 51,012; Referee: Ramon Hernandez

October 7, 2009 28	FC Dallas	2–1	San Jose Earthquakes	Santa Clara, California
	Ferreira 49'; Cunningham 81'; Ihemelu (yellow card) 90'	Report	Convey (yellow card) 18'; Ribeiro (yellow card) 32'; Amarikwa 73'	Stadium: Buck Shaw Stadium; Attendance: 9,023; Referee: Hilario Grajeda

October 17, 2009 29	Colorado Rapids	1–2	FC Dallas	Frisco, Texas
	Gibbs (yellow card) 3'; LaBrocca (yellow card) 78'; Noonan 71'; Holody (yellow card) 82'	Report	John 4'; Hernández (yellow card) 51'; McCarty (yellow card) 58'; Sala (yellow card) 62'; Ihemelu 66'; John (yellow card) 75'; Harris (yellow card) 85'	Stadium: Pizza Hut Park; Attendance: 15,243; Referee: Edvin Jurisevic

October 24, 2009 30	FC Dallas	1–2	Seattle Sounders FC	Seattle, Washington
19:30 PST	Harris 14'; Pearce (yellow card) 26'; Harris (yellow card) 38'; Ihemelu (yellow card) 70'	Report	Alonso (yellow card) 57'; Evans (yellow card) 60'; Jaqua 61'; Evans 84'	Stadium: Qwest Field; Attendance: 33,108; Referee: Baldomero Toledo

=== U.S. Open Cup qualification ===
March 28, 2009 Qualification	FC Dallas (Texas)	0–2	(Washington, D.C.) D.C. United	Washington, D.C.
		Report	Fred 21'; Barklage 66'	Stadium: Robert F. Kennedy Memorial Stadium; Attendance: 5,163; Referee: Jeff Gontarek
