= 2012 FC Dallas season =

FC Dallas
2012 season
- Owner: Clark Hunt
- Head coach: Schellas Hyndman
- Stadium: FC Dallas Stadium
- U.S. Open Cup: Third Round
- Brimstone Cup: Runners-Up
- Texas Derby: Runners-Up
- Pioneer Cup: Runners-Up
- Highest home attendance: 22,565 vs. Los Angeles Galaxy (July 28, 2012)
- Lowest home attendance: 10,069 vs. Real Salt Lake (April 25, 2012)
- Average home league attendance: 14,199
Primary colors	Secondary colors

The 2012 FC Dallas season was the seventeenth of the team's existence. The team's first game was on March 11 at FC Dallas Stadium. The team failed to make the playoffs for the first time since 2009.

== Miscellany ==
=== Allocation ranking ===
FC Dallas is in the #11 position in the MLS Allocation Ranking. The allocation ranking is the mechanism used to determine which MLS club has first priority to acquire a U.S. National Team player who signs with MLS after playing abroad, or a former MLS player who returns to the league after having gone to a club abroad for a transfer fee. A ranking can be traded, provided that part of the compensation received in return is another club's ranking.

=== International roster spots ===
FC Dallas has 8 MLS International Roster Slots for use in the 2012 season. Each club in Major League Soccer is allocated 8 international roster spots and there have been no reported trades involving FC Dallas.

=== Future draft pick trades ===
Future picks acquired: * 2013 MLS SuperDraft round 2 pick from Toronto FC.
Future picks traded: * 2013 MLS SuperDraft round 2 pick (Dallas' natural selection) to Philadelphia Union.

=== Overall ===
Competition	Started round	Current position / round	Final position / round	First match	Last match
Major League Soccer	—	C:6th O:12th		March 17, 2012	October 28, 2012
U.S. Open Cup	Third round	—	Third round	May 29, 2012	May 29, 2012

Updated to match played August 19, 2012
Source: Competitions

== Regular-season standings ==
Western Conference

Pos	Team	Pld	W	L	T	GF	GA	GD	Pts	Qualification
1	San Jose Earthquakes	34	19	6	9	72	43	+29	66	Qualification for the conference semifinals
2	Real Salt Lake	34	17	11	6	46	35	+11	57	Qualification for the conference semifinals
3	Seattle Sounders FC	34	15	8	11	51	33	+18	56	Qualification for the conference semifinals
4	LA Galaxy	34	16	12	6	59	47	+12	54	Qualification for the knockout round
5	Vancouver Whitecaps FC	34	11	13	10	35	41	−6	43	Qualification for the knockout round
6	FC Dallas	34	9	13	12	42	47	−5	39	
7	Colorado Rapids	34	11	19	4	44	50	−6	37	
8	Portland Timbers	34	8	16	10	34	56	−22	34	
9	Chivas USA	34	7	18	9	24	58	−34	30	

Source: MLS

== Major League Soccer results ==
Overall								Home						Away					
Pld	W	D	L	GF	GA	GD	Pts	W	D	L	GF	GA	GD	W	D	L	GF	GA	GD
30	9	9	12	35	38	−3	36	6	7	3	19	14	+5	3	2	9	16	24	−8

Last updated: 18 July 2012.
Source: Competitive matches

=== Major League Soccer ===
Win Draw Loss Postponed

March 11 1	FC Dallas	2–1	New York Red Bulls	Frisco, Texas USA
19:30 CDT	Benítez (yellow card) 38'; Loyd 11'; Villar 61'		McCarty (yellow card) 5'; Tainio (yellow card) 68'; Cooper 78'; Palsson (yellow card) 88'	Stadium: FC Dallas Stadium; Attendance: 20,906

March 17 2	FC Dallas	1–1	Portland Timbers	Frisco, Texas USA
	Perez 22'	Recap	Nagbe 51' (pen.)	Stadium: FC Dallas Stadium; Attendance: 12,203

March 25 3	Sporting Kansas City	2–1	FC Dallas	Kansas City, Kansas USA
	Collin (yellow card) 32' (goal) 45+4'; Myers (yellow card) 36'; Kamara 88'; Espinoza (yellow card) 90+3'	Recap	Villar 25'; Hernández (yellow card) 45+4'	Stadium: Livestrong Sporting Park; Attendance: 15,161

March 30 4	DC United	4–1	FC Dallas	Washington, D.C. USA
	McDonald (yellow card) 20'; Santos 28', 73'; DeLeon 60'; Cruz 65'; De Rosario (yellow card) 78'	Recap	Pérez 41'; D. Hernández (yellow card) 40' (yellow-red card) 77'	Stadium: RFK Stadium; Attendance: 13,169

April 5 5	FC Dallas	1–0	New England Revolution	Frisco, Texas USA
	Ihemelu 90+5'	Recap	Joseph (yellow card) 64'; Tierney (yellow card) 79'	Stadium: FC Dallas Stadium; Attendance: 11,043; Referee: Juan Guzman

April 14 6	FC Dallas	2–1	Montreal Impact	Frisco, Texas USA
	Castillo (yellow card) 28'; Perez 77'; Shea 88'	Recap	Corradi (yellow card) 18' (goal) 61' (pen.); Felipe (yellow card) 22'; Wahl (yellow card) 45+1'	Stadium: FC Dallas Stadium; Attendance: 16,164

April 21 7	Vancouver Whitecaps	1–0	FC Dallas	Vancouver, British Columbia Canada
	Sanvezzo 11'; Koffie (yellow card) 38'; Watson (yellow card) 57'	Recap	Perez (yellow card) 75'; Rodríguez (yellow card) 90'	Stadium: BC Place; Attendance: 18,027

April 25 8	FC Dallas	1–1	Real Salt Lake	Frisco, Texas USA
	Shea 46'	Recap	Johnson (yellow card) 27'; Bonfigki 72'	Stadium: FC Dallas Stadium; Attendance: 10,069

April 28 9	Los Angeles Galaxy	1–1	FC Dallas	Carson, California USA
	Gaudette (yellow card) 60'; Cristman (yellow card) 83'; Noonan 90+2'; Beckham (yellow card) 90+5'	Recap	Shea (yellow card) 4' (goal) 61'; Castillo (yellow card) 19'; Benitez (yellow card) 48'	Stadium: The Home Depot Center; Attendance: 23,249

May 6 10	FC Dallas	0–2	Colorado Rapids	Frisco, Texas USA
	Hernández (yellow card) 25' (yellow-red card) 34'; Perez (red card) 36'	Recap	Cascio (yellow card) 38'; Castrillon (yellow card) 44' (goal) 61'; Rivero 74'	Stadium: FC Dallas Stadium; Attendance: 11,702

May 9 11	FC Dallas	0–2	Seattle Sounders	Frisco, Texas USA
	John (yellow card) 57'	Recap	Burch (yellow card) 30'; Parke (yellow card) 42'; Scott (yellow card) 75'; Montero 68', 71' (yellow card) 81'	Stadium: FC Dallas Stadium; Attendance: 10,092

May 12 12 Pioneer Cup	Columbus Crew	2–1	FC Dallas	Columbus, Ohio USA
	Meram (yellow card) 52' (goal) 67'; Miranda 72'; Mirosevic (yellow card) 80'	Recap	Castillo 22' (yellow card) 60'; Loyd (yellow card) 43' (yellow-red card) 63'; Jacobson (yellow card) 45'	Stadium: Columbus Crew Stadium; Attendance: 11,120

May 19 13	FC Dallas	1–1	Philadelphia Union	Frisco, Texas USA
	Perez 7' (yellow card) 88'; Jacobson (yellow card) 72'	Recap	Lahoud (yellow card) 37'; Gomez 56'; Valdés (yellow card) 62'; Farfan (yellow card) 77'; Harrison (yellow card) 79'	Stadium: FC Dallas Stadium; Attendance: 13,272

May 23 14 Brimstone Cup	Chicago Fire	2–1	FC Dallas	Bridgeview, Illinois USA
	Gargan (yellow card) 36'; Grazzini 45'; Pappa 63' (pen.) (yellow card) 64'; Barouch (yellow card) 69'; Robayo (yellow card) 90'	Recap	John (yellow card) 30'; Hedges 41'	Stadium: Toyota Park; Attendance: 11.947

May 26 15	Real Salt Lake	3–2	FC Dallas	Sandy, Utah USA
	Alvarez (yellow card) 37'; Saborio 59', 76'; Borchers 90+3'; Espindola (yellow card) 90+6'	Recap	Hedges 75'; Perez 85'	Stadium: Rio Tinto Stadium; Attendance: 19,341

June 16 16 Texas Derby	Houston Dynamo	2–1	FC Dallas	Houston, Texas USA
	Bruin 3'; Ashe (yellow card) 20'; Moffat 76'	Recap	Jackson 59'; Benitez (red card) 63'; Castillo (yellow card) 67'	Stadium: BBVA Compass Stadium; Attendance: 22,039

June 23 17	FC Dallas	0–0	Chivas USA	Frisco, Texas USA
		Recap	Minda (yellow card) 90+2'	Stadium: FC Dallas Stadium; Attendance: 13,846

July 4 18	FC Dallas	1–1	Toronto FC	Frisco, Texas USA
	Loyd 5'	Recap	Koevermans 31'; Eckersley (yellow card) 37'; Johnson (yellow card) 43'; Frings (yellow card) 79'	Stadium: FC Dallas Stadium; Attendance: 21,508

July 7 19	FC Dallas	0–0	San Jose Earthquakes	Frisco, Texas USA
		Recap	Baca (yellow card) 21'; Corrales (yellow card) 77' (yellow-red card) 80'	Stadium: FC Dallas Stadium; Attendance: 10,132

July 14 20	Colorado Rapids	1–2	FC Dallas	Commerce City, Colorado USA
	Cummings 50'	Recap	Castillo (yellow card) 57'; Rodríguez 60'; Castillo 81'	Stadium: Dick's Sporting Goods Park; Attendance: 13,284

July 18 21	San Jose Earthquakes	2–1	FC Dallas	Santa Clara, California USA
	Chávez 12'; Gordon (yellow card) 36' (goal) 45'; Bernárdez (yellow card) 74'; Beitashour (yellow card) 81'	Recap	Loyd (yellow card) 14'; Jackson Gonçalves (yellow card) 75'; Castillo (yellow card) 81'; Pertúz 89'	Stadium: Buck Shaw Stadium; Attendance: 9,481; Referee: (United States) Kevin Stott

July 21 22	FC Dallas	5–0	Portland Timbers	Frisco, Texas USA
	Mosquera 16' (own); Jacobson 26'; Loyd (yellow card) 42'; Jackson 48'; Jacobson (yellow card) 66'; Sealy 69'; Luna 81'	Recap	Songo'o (yellow card) 11'; Mosquera (yellow card) 61'	Stadium: FC Dallas Stadium; Attendance: 11,365

July 28 23	FC Dallas	0–1	Los Angeles Galaxy	Frisco, Texas USA
	John (yellow card) 89'	Recap	Magee 62'; DeLaGarza (yellow card) 65'; Sarvas (yellow card) 69'	Stadium: FC Dallas Stadium; Attendance: 22,565

August 5 24	Portland Timbers	1–1	FC Dallas	Portland, Oregon USA
	Songo'o (yellow card) 23'; Chara (yellow card) 70'; Jewsbury 79'	Recap	Loyd (yellow card) 36' (yellow-red card) 52'; Sealy 51'	Stadium: Jeld-Wen Field; Attendance: 20,438

August 11 25	FC Dallas	3–2	Colorado Rapids	Frisco, Texas USA
		Recap		Stadium: FC Dallas Stadium; Attendance: 10,222

August 15 26	Vancouver Whitecaps	0–2	FC Dallas	Vancouver, British Columbia Canada
		Recap		Stadium: BC Place; Attendance: 19,006

August 18 27	Real Salt Lake	1–2	FC Dallas	Sandy, Utah USA
		Recap		Stadium: Rio Tinto Stadium; Attendance: 20,281

August 26 28	Los Angeles Galaxy	2–0	FC Dallas	Carson, California USA
		Recap		Stadium: The Home Depot Center; Attendance: 21,933

September 2 29	FC Dallas	1–1	Seattle Sounders	Frisco, Texas USA
		Recap		Stadium: FC Dallas Stadium; Attendance: 12,811

September 15 30	FC Dallas	1–0	Vancouver Whitecaps	Frisco, Texas USA
		Recap		Stadium: FC Dallas Stadium; Attendance: 17,685

September 29 31	San Jose Earthquakes	3 - 3	FC Dallas	Santa Clara, California USA
		Recap		Stadium: Buck Shaw Stadium; Attendance: 10,744

October 7 32	Chivas USA	1 - 1	FC Dallas	Carson, California USA
				Stadium: The Home Depot Center

October 21 33	Seattle Sounders	3 - 1	FC Dallas	Seattle, Washington USA
				Stadium: CenturyLink Field

October 28 34	FC Dallas	2 - 2	Chivas USA	Frisco, Texas USA
				Stadium: FC Dallas Stadium; Attendance: 15,805

== U.S. Open Cup ==
=== Match results ===
May 29, 2012 Third Round	FC Dallas (Texas)	0–2	(North Carolina) Charlotte Eagles	Frisco, Texas
7:30 PM CDT		Recap	Roberts 43'; Thornton 90+4'	Stadium: FC Dallas Stadium; Attendance: 1,702; Referee: Jorge Luna Hernandez

=== Goals ===
R	Player	Position	MLS	U.S. Open Cup	Total
1	(Panama) Blas Pérez	FW	5	0	5
1	(Colombia) Fabián Castillo	FW	5	0	5
2	(United States) Brek Shea	MF	3	0	3
2	(Brazil) Jackson	DF	3	0	3
3	(United States) Zach Loyd	DF	2	0	2
3	(Brazil) Ricardo Villar	MF	2	0	2
3	(United States) Matt Hedges	DF	2	0	2
3	(Trinidad and Tobago) Scott Sealy	FW	2	0	2
3	(Colombia) David Ferreira	FW	2	0	2
4	(United States) Ugo Ihemelu	DF	1	0	1
4	(United States) Andrew Jacobson	MF	1	0	1
4	(United States) Jonathan Top	FW	1	0	1
4	(Colombia) Hernán Pertúz	DF	1	0	1
4	(Colombia) Jair Benítez	DF	1	0	1
4	(Mexico) Ruben Luna	FW	1	0	1
4	(Panama) Carlos Rodríguez	DF	1	0	1
4	Own goal		1	0	1

Last updated: 19 August 2012
Source: Match reports in Competitive matches

== Jerseys ==
Home	Away	Away Alternate

Type	Shirt	Shorts	Socks	First appearance / Info
Home	Red / White hoops	Red	Red	
Away	Blue / White hoops	Blue	Blue	
Away Alt.	Blue / White hoops	Grey	Blue	MLS, May 23 against Chicago
