= 2011 Walt Disney World Pro Soccer Classic =

Tournament details
- Host country: United States
- Dates: February 24–26
- Teams: 4
- Venue(s): 1 (in 1 host city)

Final positions
- Champions: (United States) FC Dallas (1st title)
- Runners-up: (United States) Houston Dynamo
- Third place: (United States) Orlando City

Tournament statistics
- Matches played: 4
- Goals scored: 9 (2.25 per match)

The 2011 Walt Disney World Pro Soccer Classic was a preseason soccer tournament held at Walt Disney World's ESPN Wide World of Sports Complex. The tournament, the second edition of the Pro Soccer Classic, was held from February 24 to 26 and featured three Major League Soccer clubs alongside one USL Pro club.

The tournament was won by FC Dallas, who defeated Houston Dynamo on penalties in the final.

== Teams ==
The following four clubs competed in the tournament:

- (United States) Orlando City from the USL Professional Division, hosts (1st appearance)
- (Canada) Toronto FC from Major League Soccer (2nd appearance)
- (United States) FC Dallas from Major League Soccer (2nd appearance)
- (United States) Houston Dynamo from Major League Soccer (2nd appearance)

== Matches ==
=== Semi-finals ===
February 24

Orlando City (United States)	0–1	(United States) FC Dallas
	Report	30' Rodríguez

ESPN Wide World of Sports Complex, Bay Lake, Florida, United States

February 24

Toronto FC (Canada)	2–3	(United States) Houston Dynamo
Peterson 7'; De Rosario 29' (pen.)	Report	11' Cameron; 43' Davis; 68' Weaver

ESPN Wide World of Sports Complex, Bay Lake, Florida, United States

=== Championship Round ===
==== Consolation match ====
February 26

Orlando City (United States)	1–0	(Canada) Toronto FC
Fuller 76'	Report

ESPN Wide World of Sports Complex, Bay Lake, Florida, United States
Attendance: 1,634
Referee: Sorin Stoica

==== Final ====
February 26

FC Dallas (United States)	1–1 (a.e.t.)	(United States) Houston Dynamo
Luna 15'	Report	Navas 83'
Penalties
Ferreira (penalty scored); Galindo (penalty scored); Avila (penalty scored); Guarda (penalty scored); Shea (penalty scored)	5–3	(penalty missed) Palmer; (penalty scored) Davis; (penalty scored) Soto; (penalty scored) Bruin

ESPN Wide World of Sports Complex, Bay Lake, Florida, United States
Attendance: 1,634
Referee: Edvin Jurisevic
