= Richard Sánchez (footballer, born 1994) =

Professional footballer

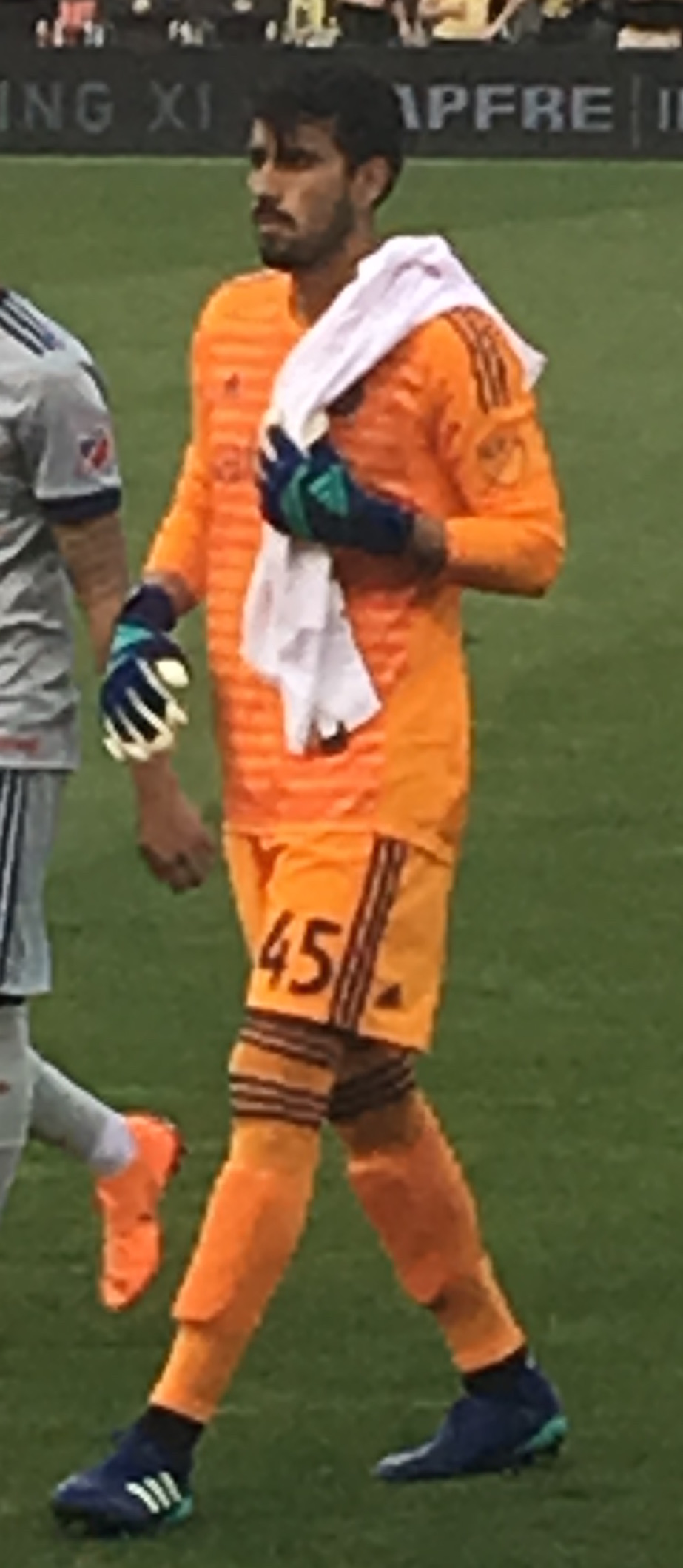
- Sánchez with Chicago Fire in 2018

Personal information
- Full name: Richard Sánchez Alcaraz
- Date of birth: 5 April 1994 (age 32)
- Place of birth: Mission Hills, California, United States
- Height: 1.91 m (6 ft 3 in)
- Position: Goalkeeper

Team information
- Current team: San Antonio FC
- Number: 1

Youth career
- Texas FC
- 2008–2009: Atlético Madrid
- 2009–2011: FC Dallas

Senior career*
Years	Team	Apps	(Gls)
2011–2014	FC Dallas	0	(0)
2013	→ Fort Lauderdale Strikers (loan)	14	(0)
2014–2017	Tigres UANL	0	(0)
2014	→ FC Dallas (loan)	0	(0)
2016–2017	→ Tampico Madero (loan)	5	(0)
2017–2019	Chicago Fire	27	(0)
2020	Sporting Kansas City	2	(0)
2020	Sporting Kansas City II	1	(0)
2021	North Texas SC	18	(0)
2022	LA Galaxy	0	(0)
2022	LA Galaxy II	13	(0)
2023	Hartford Athletic	14	(0)
2023	Memphis 901	3	(0)
2024–	San Antonio FC	32	(0)

International career^{‡}
2011	Mexico U17	7	(0)
2013	Mexico U20	12	(0)
2014–2015	Mexico U21	3	(0)
Medal record
Representing Mexico
First place	FIFA U-17 World Cup	2011 Mexico
First place	CONCACAF U-20 Championship	2013 Mexico
- * Club domestic league appearances and goals as of 31 October 2026 ‡ National team caps and goals as of 21 October 2014

Richard Sánchez Alcaraz (born 5 April 1994) is a professional footballer who plays as a goalkeeper for USL Championship side San Antonio FC. Born in the United States, he played for the Mexico national under-21 team.

== Youth ==
Born in Mission Hills, California, Sánchez is of Mexican-American heritage. He moved to Dallas, Texas and started playing with Texas Football Club before joining Atlético Madrid in Spain. In 2009, he moved back to Dallas and joined the FC Dallas Academy. Sánchez briefly attended Little Elm High School in Little Elm, Texas.

== Professional career ==
=== FC Dallas ===
Sánchez signed a professional contract with FC Dallas of Major League Soccer in February 2011, becoming their sixth homegrown player. Despite failing to make an appearance (other than in MLS Reserve League games), he signed an extension following the 2012 season.

=== Fort Lauderdale Strikers (loan) ===
In July 2013, Sánchez was loaned to the Fort Lauderdale Strikers of the North American Soccer League for the remainder of the season. He made his professional debut for the Strikers on 3 August. He started all 14 games in goal for the Strikers in the Fall season and kept three clean sheets.

=== Tigres UANL ===
In June 2014, Sánchez was sold to Tigres UANL. He made his debut as a substitute in a friendly against the San Antonio Scorpions. Soon after joining Tigres, he was briefly loaned back to FC Dallas before returning to Tigres in September 2014.

=== Chicago Fire ===
After a series of loans away from Tigres, Sánchez was released in the summer of 2017. He signed with the Chicago Fire in August 2017.

=== Sporting Kansas City ===
On 26 November 2019, Sánchez was selected by Sporting Kansas City in Stage 1 of the 2019 MLS Re-Entry Draft. On 9 December 2020 his contract option was declined.

=== North Texas SC ===
On 22 April 2021, Sánchez joined USL League One side North Texas SC ahead of the 2021 season.

=== LA Galaxy ===
On 18 January 2022, Sánchez signed a one-year deal with LA Galaxy as a free agent.

=== Hartford Athletic ===
On 3 January 2023, Sánchez moved to USL Championship side Hartford Athletic.

=== Memphis 901 ===
On 25 September 2023, Sánchez transferred to Memphis 901.

=== San Antonio FC ===
Sánchez joined San Antonio FC in September 2024. He re-signed with San Antonio in January 2025.

== International career ==
Sánchez became a key figure for Mexico's under-17 team at the 2011 FIFA U-17 World Cup. He became first choice goalkeeper under coach Raul Gutierrez, and started all seven games. He and his teammates were the first nation to win the tournament on home soil. He kept two clean sheets during the tournament including in the final. He later played with the Mexico under-20 team as first choice goalkeeper in the 2013 FIFA Under-20 World Cup in Turkey.

== Career statistics ==
=== Club ===
As of 24 January 2024

Club	Season	League			Playoffs		Cup		Continental		Total	
Club	Season	Division	Apps	Goals	Apps	Goals	Apps	Goals	Apps	Goals	Apps	Goals
FC Dallas	2011	MLS	—		—		—		—		0	0
FC Dallas	2012	MLS	—		—		—		—		0	0
FC Dallas	2013	MLS	—		—		—		—		0	0
FC Dallas	2014	MLS	—		—		—		—		0	0
FC Dallas	Total		—		—		—		—		0	0
Fort Lauderdale Strikers (loan)	2013	NASL	14	0	—		—		—		14	0
Tigres UANL	2014–15	Liga MX	—		—		—		—		0	0
Tigres UANL	2015–16	Liga MX	—		—		—		—		0	0
Tigres UANL	2016–17	Liga MX	—		—		—		—		0	0
Tigres UANL	Total		—		—		—		—		0	0
FC Dallas (loan)	2014	MLS	—		—		0	0	—		0	0
Tampico Madero (loan)	2016–17	Ascenso MX	5	0	—		—		—		5	0
Chicago Fire	2017	MLS	2	0	—		—		—		2	0
Chicago Fire	2018	MLS	25	0	—		4	0	—		29	0
Chicago Fire	2019	MLS	—		—		0	0	1 (Note: Appearance in Leagues Cup)	0	1	0
Chicago Fire	Total		27	0	—		4	0	1	0	32	0
Sporting KC	2020	MLS	2	0	—		—		—		2	0
Sporting KC II	2020	USL Championship	1	0	—		—		—		1	0
North Texas	2021	USL League One	19	0	—		—		—		19	0
LA Galaxy II	2022	USL Championship	13	0	—		—		—		13	0
Hartford Athletic	2023	USL Championship	14	0	—		1	0	—		15	0
Memphis 901	2023	USL Championship	3	0	—		—		—		3	0
Career total			98	0	0	0	5	0	1	0	104	0

== Honours ==
Mexico Youth

- FIFA U-17 World Cup: 2011
- CONCACAF U-20 Championship: 2013

Individual

- CONCACAF U-20 Championship Best XI: 2013
- CONCACAF U-20 Championship Golden Glove: 2013

== Personal life ==
Sánchez's wife is Christina Murillo, also a footballer who, like him, was born in the United States, but has represented Mexico internationally at the U17, U20 and Senior levels. She currently works for Chicago Fire FC.
