= Pablo Ricchetti =

Argentine footballer and coach

Personal information
- Full name: Pablo Javier Ricchetti
- Date of birth: January 2, 1977 (age 49)
- Place of birth: Buenos Aires, Argentina
- Height: 6 ft 0 in (1.83 m)
- Position: Central midfielder

Youth career
- River Plate

Senior career*
Years	Team	Apps	(Gls)
1997–1998	River Plate	5	(0)
1998–2000	Colón	68	(2)
2000–2005	Real Valladolid	102	(1)
2005–2006	Ternana	2	(0)
2006	Quilmes	5	(0)
2007–2010	FC Dallas	68	(1)
2011–2012	Deportivo Anzoátegui	8	(0)

Managerial career
- Andromeda FC (youth)
- 2016–2017: Lanús (assistant)
- 2018: Atlético Nacional (assistant)
- 2018–2019: San Lorenzo (assistant)
- 2020–2021: Santamarina
- 2022: Mitre SdE
- 2023–2024: Johor Darul Ta'zim (assistant)
- 2025: Colo-Colo (assistant)
- 2025: Colo-Colo (caretaker)
- * Club domestic league appearances and goals

Pablo Ricchetti (born January 2, 1977, in Buenos Aires) is an Argentine football manager.

== Club career ==
=== South America ===
Ricchetti began his soccer career in 1985 at the age of seven when he joined the youth-system of famed-Argentine club River Plate. He stayed with the club for 14 years making his first appearance with the first team in February 1996. In 1998, Ricchetti was transferred to Colón, also of the Argentine First Division, where he played for two seasons before being transferred to Real Valladolid of the Spanish First Division in 2000. Pablo played 110 games with Real Valladolid through 2005. After a brief stint with Italian team Ternana, he returned to Argentina playing one season for Quilmes in 2006.

=== North America ===
Ricchetti signed with FC Dallas on April 5, 2007, and made his MLS debut on May 12, 2007. He started all 19 games he appeared in and was named captain for three games. The team was 10-7-2 when Ricchetti was in the starting lineup and 3-5-3 without. In 2008, Ricchetti made 25 starts and was third on the team for minutes played with 2,252. Ricchetti was voted the team's Defender of the Year for 2008 by members of the local media and was recognized as FC Dallas’ Humanitarian of the Year for his charitable contributions to the community.

Richetti is now playing in NTPSA Men's 30A division with Azzurri and with Westham F.C. in the O-30A at the Soccer Spectrum.

== Coaching career ==
=== Collaborator and analyst ===
In the 2010–11 season, Richetti was the head coach of Andromeda FC's U10 team in Texas while playing for FC Dallas. After retiring at the end of 2012, Ricchetti started working for the United States Soccer Federation, where he was analyzing opponent teams and players. In 2014, Richetti was hired as a collaborator to Oscar Pareja's coaching staff at FC Dallas. He then moved back to Argentina in 2015 to work as an opponent analyst for Boca Juniors.

=== Lanús ===
In January 2016, Richetti returned to Argentina and was hired to be as Jorge Almirón's assistant coach at Lanús.

=== Atlético Nacional ===
In 2018, Richetti joined his Almirón's as his assistant in Colombia at Atlético Nacional.

=== San Lorenzo ===
On 15 November 2018, Richetti again joined Almiron's for the third time back in his native country joining San Lorenzo until 13 May 2019.

=== Santamarina ===
On 7 February 2020, Richetti was appointed his first opportunity as a head coach of Primera B Nacional team, Santamarina. On 7 July 2021, he was sacked from his coaching duties at the club.

=== Mitre ===
On 22 April 2022, Richetti was hired to be the head coach of Primera Nacional club, Mitre until the end of the year.

=== Johor Darul Ta'zim ===
In January 2023, Richetti moved to Asia to joined Malaysia Super League club, Johor Darul Ta'zim where he was appointed the assistant coach under Esteban Solari.

=== Colo-Colo ===
In 2025, Ricchetti joined the technical staff of Jorge Almirón in Chilean club Colo-Colo. He was the caretaker manager in the 0–1 win against Unión La Calera on 1 June for the Liga de Primera.
