= Zach Loyd =

American soccer player (born 1987)

- Image of Zach Loyd defending

Personal information
- Full name: Zachary Robert Loyd
- Date of birth: July 18, 1987 (age 39)
- Place of birth: Tulsa, Oklahoma, United States
- Height: 5 ft 9 in (1.75 m)
- Position: Defender

Team information
- Current team: Lone Star Republic (head coach)

College career
Years	Team	Apps	(Gls)
2006–2009	North Carolina Tar Heels	78	(7)

Senior career*
Years	Team	Apps	(Gls)
2007–2009	Carolina Dynamo	25	(5)
2010–2016	FC Dallas	180	(4)
2017	Atlanta United	0	(0)

International career^{‡}
2011–2012	United States	3	(0)

Managerial career
- 2019–: Lone Star Republic
- * Club domestic league appearances and goals as of 17:07, 26 October 2017 (UTC) ‡ National team caps and goals as of October 29, 2014

Zachary Robert Loyd (born July 18, 1987) is an American former professional soccer player. He played for FC Dallas and Atlanta United in Major League Soccer and represented the USMNT. Loyd is currently the head coach for Lone Star Republic in the United Premier Soccer League.

== Career ==
=== College and amateur ===
Loyd is the one of four sons of Alan and Kathleen Loyd. Loyd grew up in Verdigris, Oklahoma, attended Verdigris High School and played college soccer at the University of North Carolina (UNC) from 2006 to 2009. While at UNC, Loyd scored 7 goals and recorded 10 assists. Loyd also garnered a spot on the NCAA College Cup All-Tournament Team his junior year. Loyd assisted Brian Shriver for a game-winning goal against No. 1 Wake Forest in the national semifinal, advancing UNC to the College Cup final to face Maryland. During his college years Loyd also played for Carolina Dynamo in the USL Premier Development League.

At the 2010 MLS SuperDraft Combine, experts praised Loyd's efforts, saying, "If Tchani was the best player at the combine, Loyd was the second most impressive. His ability to play well at whatever position he was put in showed off all of his many qualities, including a good passing touch, hard-nosed defending, a good ability to read the game, and surprising pace." "He's just a good all-around player, and the scary part is, he didn't really play much at what is probably his best position, defensive midfield," said another MLS head coach. "In our league, where you have the salary cap and the small roster, finding a player who can help you at a variety of positions is like finding gold."

=== Professional ===
Loyd was drafted in the first round (5th overall) of the 2010 MLS SuperDraft by FC Dallas. He made his professional debut on April 10, 2010, in a game against Columbus Crew with Loyd playing all 90 minutes of the 2–2 draw. During the 2010 MLS season, Loyd appeared in 24 matches and started 19 of them. Loyd was named to the MLS Team of Week 1 of the 2011 season for his performance against the Chicago Fire. He scored his first MLS goal on June 25, 2011, during a 4–0 win against the Portland Timbers. The goal came off a corner kick from Daniel Hernandez. Loyd scored FC Dallas' opening goal for the 2012 MLS season, in a match against the New York Red Bulls.

Loyd spent his early years with Dallas primarily as the starting right back. In his later years, he primarily played more as a center back. After an injury cut short his 2016 season, Loyd was selected by Atlanta United in the 2016 expansion draft. After being put on the season-ending injury list in August 2017 the option on his contract was declined at the end of the 2017 season. His only game for Atlanta came in the US Open Cup.

=== International ===
On January 22, 2011, Loyd made his international debut in a friendly match against Chile, where he started at the left-back position. The game ended in a 1–1 draw with Loyd playing 73 minutes. He was named Man of the Match.

== Personal life ==
During his time at North Carolina, Loyd majored in exercise and sport science, and planned a career as a teacher and coach after soccer. Loyd has three brothers, two of whom played at Benedictine College. He married professional soccer player Casey Nogueira, whom he met when they both played soccer at North Carolina, on October 13, 2012. The couple coach Vickery United, a youth soccer team for refugees in the North Dallas neighborhood of Vickery Meadow.

== Honors ==
=== University of North Carolina ===
- NCAA College Cup All-Tournament Team (1): 2008
- NCAA Final Four Appearances (2): 2008, 2009

=== FC Dallas ===
- Major League Soccer Western Conference Championship (1): 2010
- Major League Soccer Supporters' Shield (1): 2016
- Lamar Hunt U.S. Open Cup (1): 2016
