= Bruno Guarda =

Brazilian footballer (born 1986)

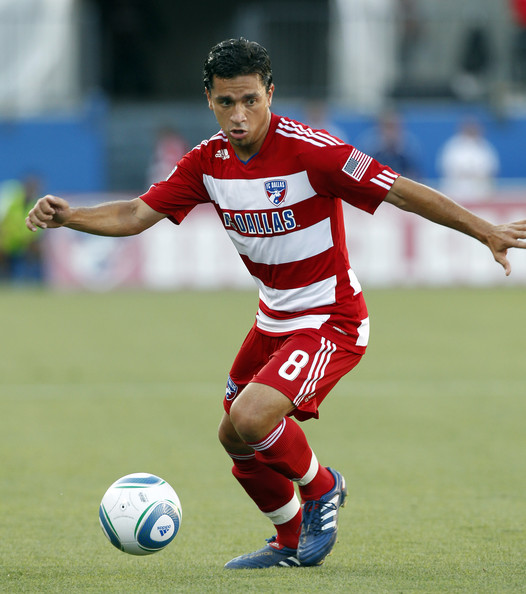

Personal information
- Full name: Bruno Ernesto Guarda
- Date of birth: February 6, 1986 (age 40)
- Place of birth: Piracicaba, Brazil
- Height: 5 ft 8 in (1.73 m)
- Position: Defensive midfielder

College career
Years	Team	Apps	(Gls)
2005–2008	SMU Mustangs		

Senior career*
Years	Team	Apps	(Gls)
2005–2008	DFW Tornados	42	(10)
2008	Colorado Rapids	0	(0)
2008–2012	FC Dallas	40	(1)
2012–2014	Dallas Sidekicks (indoor)	7	(7)
2019	Dallas Sidekicks (indoor)	0	(0)
- * Club domestic league appearances and goals as of July 2, 2020

Bruno Ernesto Guarda (born February 6, 1986), also known as Peter Jackson and DJ - BG, is a Brazilian footballer who last played for the Dallas Sidekicks in the Major Arena Soccer League.

== Career ==
=== College ===
Guarda moved to the United States in high school, and attended The Oakridge School in Arlington, Texas, before playing college soccer for Southern Methodist University, where he was named to the NSCAA All-Midwest Region first team in 2006, and was a Hermann Trophy semi-finalist and the Conference USA Player of the Year in both 2006 and 2007. During his college years Guarda also played for DFW Tornados in the USL Premier Development League, scoring 10 goals in 42 appearances for the team.

=== Professional ===
Guarda left college in his final year to concentrate on a professional soccer career. He was allocated to Colorado Rapids in a weighted lottery and signed a developmental contract with them. However, he was soon traded to FC Dallas (reuniting him with his former college coach Schellas Hyndman) in return for their 2009 MLS SuperDraft 2nd and 3rd round picks and allocation money.

Guarda joined FC Dallas on July 28, 2008 and made his professional debut on August 3, 2008, coming on as a substitute for Andre Rocha against Toronto FC. He scored his first goal for FC Dallas on September 21, 2008 in a 4-1 victory against the Chicago Fire. He played in every game after the trade, starting the final nine games of the 2008 regular season as an attacking midfielder.

Guarda graduated from the MLS Generation Adidas program at the end of the 2010 season.

== Honours ==
=== FC Dallas ===
- Major League Soccer Western Conference Championship (1): 2010
