= André Rocha (footballer) =

Brazilian footballer (born 1984)

Personal information
- Full name: André Guerreiro Rocha
- Date of birth: August 19, 1984 (age 42)
- Place of birth: São Paulo, Brazil
- Height: 6 ft 1 in (1.85 m)
- Positions: Midfielder; defender

Youth career
- 2002–2003: Águas de Lindóia

Senior career*
Years	Team	Apps	(Gls)
2003	Independente		
2004	Portuguesa Santista		
2004	Palmeiras	5	(0)
2005–2009	Atlético Paranaense	16	(0)
2008–2009	→ FC Dallas (loan)	49	(5)
2010	Ponte Preta	6	(0)
2010–2012	Panetolikos	55	(4)
2013	Figueirense	36	(0)
2014	Vasco da Gama	30	(1)
2015	Botafogo-SP	15	(0)
2016	Água Santa	7	(0)
2016–2017	Bragantino	16	(0)
2017	Lamia	16	(1)
2018	Noroeste	0	(0)
2018	Tombense	6	(0)
2019	Portuguesa	0	(0)
2020	Nacional SP	0	(0)
- * Club domestic league appearances and goals

André Guerreiro Rocha (born August 19, 1984) is a Brazilian former professional footballer who played as a midfielder or defender.

== Career ==
=== South America ===
Rocha began his professional career in 2002 as a right-back with Aguas de Lindoia Esporte Clube, a fourth division São Paulo-based club. In 2004, after a short stint with Portuguesa Santista, he was purchased by Palmeiras of the top division, where he played one season. In 2005, he joined Atletico Paranaense playing in 47 games, including nine appearances in the 2005 Copa Libertadores helping the team reach the finals. He also made one appearance in 2007 Copa Sudamerica. In February 2010 Rocha joined Ponte Preta a second division club. In February 2013 André Rocha made his comeback to Brazil signing with Figueirense.

=== Major League Soccer ===
Rocha signed with FC Dallas on February 12, 2008, and made his MLS debut on March 30, 2008, in which he played all 90 minutes in a 1–1 tie against Chivas USA. During the 2008 season, Rocha led the team with eight assists, recording his first MLS career assist in a 3–3 tie against the Houston Dynamo on April 6, 2008, and his first MLS career goal on August 23, 2008, in a 1–1 tie against the Kansas City Wizards.

=== Greece ===
On August 31, 2010, Rocha signed a two-year contract with Super League Greece club Panetolikos.
