= Ugo Ihemelu =

American soccer player (born 1983)

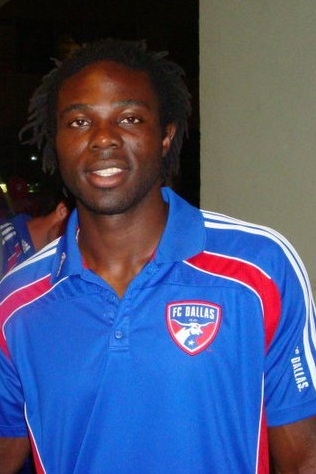

Personal information
- Full name: Ugochukwu Ihemelu
- Date of birth: April 3, 1983 (age 43)
- Place of birth: Enugu, Nigeria
- Height: 6 ft 0 in (1.83 m)
- Position: Defender

Youth career
- 2001–2004: SMU Mustangs

Senior career*
Years	Team	Apps	(Gls)
2004	Legends FC		
2005–2006	Los Angeles Galaxy	54	(0)
2007–2009	Colorado Rapids	63	(1)
2009–2013	FC Dallas	68	(5)
Total		185	(6)

International career^{‡}
2006–2009	United States	2	(0)
- * Club domestic league appearances and goals as of October 16, 2012 ‡ National team caps and goals as of January 24, 2009

Ugochukwu "Ugo" Ihemelu // (born April 3, 1983) is a retired soccer player. Born in Nigeria, he has played for the United States national team.

== Career ==
=== College ===
Ihemelu grew up in the United States, attended Cedar Hill High School in Cedar Hill, Texas (a suburb of Dallas), and played college soccer at Southern Methodist University, where he was named All-Missouri Valley Conference his junior and senior seasons.

During his collegiate off-season, Ihemelu played with the Texas-based USASA team Legends FC, who he helped qualify for the U.S. Open Cup in 2004.

=== Professional ===
The Los Angeles Galaxy drafted him with the fifth overall pick of the 2005 MLS SuperDraft. He helped the Galaxy to the US Open Cup and MLS Cup double in his rookie season. After his second season in LA, on December 1, 2006, Ihemelu was traded to the Colorado Rapids. After 3 years with Colorado, Ihemelu was traded to FC Dallas in exchange for Drew Moor, a 2010 MLS SuperDraft pick, and allocation money.

Ihemelu was named to the MLS Team of the Week in weeks 8 and 11 in the 2011 MLS season for his play against D.C. United, Seattle Sounders FC, and Houston Dynamo. On June 30, 2011, he signed a contract extension with FC Dallas through the 2015 MLS season. Prior to the 2012 MLS season, Ihemelu was named FC Dallas captain. During the 2012 season, he suffered a concussion that eventually led to his retirement.

=== International ===
Ihemelu made his debut for the United States on January 29, 2006, against Norway.

Unusually, he was then called up by Canada in June 2008 and traveled with the team for their match against Saint Vincent and the Grenadines. While the Canadian Soccer Association has Ihemelu's hometown listed as Winnipeg, Manitoba, Ihemelu's eligibility to play for Canada was in doubt, due to his appearing for the United States in the aforementioned Norway game, and to questions over his Canadian citizenship. For these reasons, the Canadians did not field Ihemelu in the Saint Vincent game.

In January 2009 Ihemelu was called into the US's training camp. He joined San Jose (MLS) defender Jason Hernandez as replacements for Clarence Goodson and Cory Gibbs who left camp early. He then appeared in the match following the camp against Sweden, clearing a guaranteed goal off the line.

== Honours ==
Los Angeles Galaxy

- U.S. Open Cup: 2005
- Major League Soccer MLS Cup: 2005
- Major League Soccer Western Conference Championship : 2005

FC Dallas

- Major League Soccer Western Conference Championship: 2010

== See also ==
- Ugochukwu
- History of Nigerian Americans in Dallas–Fort Worth

Sporting positions
Preceded by Daniel Hernández	FC Dallas captain 2012	Succeeded by David Ferreira
