= Ricardo Villar (Brazilian footballer) =

Brazilian footballer

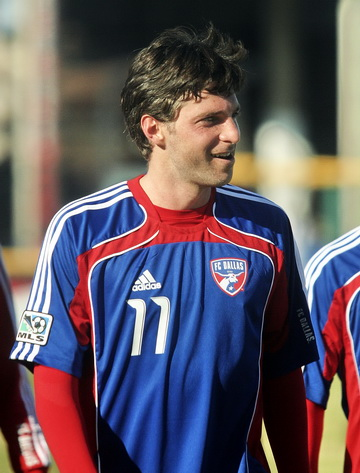
- with FC Dallas, 2011

Personal information
- Full name: Ricardo Villar
- Date of birth: August 11, 1979 (age 47)
- Place of birth: São Paulo, Brazil
- Height: 1.77 m (5 ft 10 in)
- Position: Midfielder

Youth career
- 1986–1996: São Paulo

College career
Years	Team	Apps	(Gls)
1996–2001	Penn State Nittany Lions		

Senior career*
Years	Team	Apps	(Gls)
2002–2003	Hampton Roads Mariners	21	(4)
2003–2004	Pittsburgh Riverhounds	28	(4)
2004–2005	Austria Salzburg	21	(2)
2005	Chunnam Dragons	4	(0)
2006–2007	1. FC Kaiserslautern	10	(0)
2007–2009	SpVgg Unterhaching	63	(9)
2009–2010	Rodos	15	(1)
2010	SpVgg Unterhaching	10	(0)
2011–2012	FC Dallas	28	(2)
Total		200	(20)
- * Club domestic league appearances and goals

Ricardo Villar (born August 11, 1979) is a Brazilian former professional footballer who played as a midfielder.

== Career ==
Born in São Paulo, Villar began his football career in the youth ranks of famed Brazilian side São Paulo FC. In 1996, he left Brazil to attend Penn State University in the United States where he played College Soccer for four years. Upon ending his college career Villar remained in the United States and played for lower level sides Hampton Roads Mariners and Pittsburgh Riverhounds.

In 2004, he would leave the United States and join Austrian top flight side SV Austria Salzburg where he would remain for one year and be relatively used. After a brief stay in South Korea with Chunnam Dragons, Villar joined Germany's 1. FC Kaiserslautern and remained there for one season. In 2007, he joined SpVgg Unterhaching and was a key player for the club appearing in 63 league matches and scoring 9 goals. After three years in Germany Villar joined Greek side AS Rodos and remained at the club for one season making 15 appearances and scoring 1 goal. In the off-season he returned to SpVgg Unterhaching in time for the 2010–11 season.

On February 7, 2011, Villar signed with Major League Soccer club FC Dallas.

== Personal life ==
He also holds Italian citizenship.
