= Rubén Luna =

Mexican footballer (born 1992)

Personal information
- Full name: Rubén Abimelec Luna Izaguirre
- Date of birth: February 10, 1992 (age 34)
- Place of birth: Ciudad Victoria, Mexico
- Height: 6 ft 0 in (1.83 m)
- Position: Forward

Youth career
- 2009–2010: FC Dallas

Senior career*
Years	Team	Apps	(Gls)
2010–2012	FC Dallas	27	(3)
2012	→ San Antonio Scorpions (loan)	0	(0)
2013	Atlanta Silverbacks	19	(8)
2014–2015	Inter Playa del Carmen	?	(?)
2016–2017	Rio Grande Valley FC	35	(11)

International career
2011	Mexico U20	1	(0)
- * Club domestic league appearances and goals as of 21 October 2017 (UTC)

Rubén Luna (born February 10, 1992) is a Mexican former footballer who played as a forward.

== Career ==
=== Youth ===
Luna had a distinguished youth career with FC Dallas in the USSF Development Academy. In 2009, he was named the league's U16 Player of the Year following a season in which he scored 38 goals in 27 games. He was named to the U18 Development Academy Best XI in 2010. In 2011 Luna was called up by Mexico's U-20 Men's National Team with whom he played one game versus the El Salvadoran team Isidro Metapan. Luna scored as the game ended 1–1. He failed to make the FIFA U-20 World Cup team for Mexico in 2011.

=== Professional ===
Taking advantage of Major League Soccer's new rules allowing clubs to sign youth players directly from their academy, FC Dallas inked Luna to his first professional contract on July 30, 2010, along with Moises Hernandez and Victor Ulloa. Luna, Hernandez, and Ulloa became the second, third, and fourth FC Dallas youth players to progress to the first team following Bryan Leyva. He made his MLS debut on September 4, 2010, before scoring his first career MLS goal in a 4–2 loss on October 22, 2011, at San Jose. A 19-year-old Luna appeared in 15 MLS games for FC Dallas that season. Luna's first MLS assist was a game winner to World Cup veteran Marvin Chavez on July 31, 2011. Luna also led FC Dallas with two goals in CONCACAF Champions League competition. Both goals came in his only start of the tournament, a 5–3 loss to Tauro FC on September 28, 2011. Luna led the MLS Reserve League in goals with 10 goals in 9 games. In 2012 Luna played 7 games and scored his lone goal of the MLS season against the Portland Timbers in the 81st minute on July 22, 2012. Luna also picked up his first two goals of the 2012 MLS Reserve League on May 1 as FC Dallas Reserves drew Sporting Kansas City Reserves 2-2. On September 4, 2012, Luna scored against Mexican powerhouse Tigres in a friendly, leveling the match 1-1.

On August 20, 2012, Luna was loaned to North American Soccer League club San Antonio Scorpions towards the end of their 2012 season, but failed to make an appearance for them.

Luna was released by Dallas on November 7, 2012.

On 19 March 2013, Luna was signed by the Atlanta Silverbacks of the NASL. Luna led the Silverbacks to the club's first championship scoring 5 goals and finishing in 3rd place in the Golden Boot race. Luna was NASL Player of the Week on three occasions and NASL Team of the Week on four occasions. On May 21, 2013, Luna led his team in the Lamar Hunt U.S. Open Cup tournament scoring two goals versus Georgia Revolution and adding an assist versus Real Salt Lake on May 29, 2013. During the NASL Fall Season, Luna would score three goals, finishing 2013 with season totals of 10 goals and 3 assists.

After spending 2014 and 2015 with Segunda División de México side Inter Playa del Carmen, Luna signed with United Soccer League side Rio Grande Valley FC Toros on July 13, 2016.

== Honours ==
FC Dallas

- Major League Soccer Western Conference Championship: 2010

Atlanta Silverbacks

- North American Soccer League 2013 NASL Spring Champions: 2013

Individual

- Major League Soccer Reserve League Leading Goal Scorer: 2011
