= Bryan Leyva =

Mexican footballer (born 1992)

Personal information
- Full name: Bryan Roberto Leyva Caro
- Date of birth: 8 February 1992 (age 34)
- Place of birth: Chihuahua, Chihuahua, Mexico
- Height: 5 ft 6 in (1.68 m)
- Position: Midfielder

Youth career
- 2008–2009: FC Dallas

Senior career*
Years	Team	Apps	(Gls)
2009–2012	FC Dallas	10	(0)
2009-2012	Dallas Reserves	7	(4)
2012-2013	Chivas Rayadas	?	(?)
2013-2014	Guadalajara	0	(0)
2014-2017	Dallas City FC	?	(?)

International career^{‡}
2009	Mexico U17	5	(0)
- * Club domestic league appearances and goals as of November 7, 2012 ‡ National team caps and goals as of May 16, 2010

Bryan Leyva (born February 8, 1992) is a Mexican former footballer. He last played as an attacking midfielder for Dallas City FC (DCFC) of the National Premier Soccer League.

== Youth career ==
When he was 8 Leyva and his family moved to Northern Texas it was his uncle was the reason that they moved there. Luckily for him it would become better for him as he was a substitute for his first Professional footballer game ever at the 77th minute against LA Galaxy. His first professional appearance would also motivate the coaches to show his developmental skills.

He only recently joined the team as he had a stint with Mexico U-18 football team where they went to Spain.

Leyva joined the FC Dallas Development Academy in June 2008 as a member of the U-16 team. He helped lead the team to a second-place finish in that year's MLS/SUM U-17 Cup. The midfielder also had training stints with Lille OSC in France and Racing Santander in Spain.

== Club career ==
In 2009, FC Dallas General Manager Michael Hitchcock announced that Leyva had been signed to its professional team. The signing made Leyva the first homegrown player in FC Dallas history. Over the next few years, he did not receive much playing time and was released by Dallas on November 7, 2012. After a stint in Mexico, he returned to Dallas to join lower league side, DCFC.

In a game against Philadelphia Union he recorded his first assist to Blas Pérez where they went halftime into winning.

== Personal life ==
He has his own Facebook account where he hasn't posted since 2022.
