= Lamar Hunt Pioneer Cup =

Major League Soccer Series

- The Lamar Hunt Pioneer Cup initial logo
- Type: Cup awarded to the team with the most aggregate goals per year
- Teams: Columbus Crew; FC Dallas
- First meeting: March 11, 2007; Friendly; Dallas 0–3 Columbus
- Latest meeting: October 28, 2026; MLS regular season Dallas 0–2 Columbus
- Next meeting: TBD
- Stadiums: Toyota Stadium; ScottsMiracle-Gro Field

Statistics
- All-time record: Columbus: 7 Drawn: 5 Dallas: 3

The Lamar Hunt Pioneer Cup is a Major League Soccer (MLS) series between FC Dallas and the Columbus Crew. The series is named after the late Lamar Hunt, who was one of the league's early major investors and a key supporter of American soccer. Initially, the series was contested between the two teams still owned by the Hunt Sports Group (Sporting Kansas City was also previously owned by the Hunt Sports Group, but was sold before the Pioneer Cup began). However, Columbus was sold in 2013, and thus FC Dallas remains the only MLS team still owned by the Hunt Sports Group. The Pioneer Cup is the second event in American soccer named after Lamar Hunt, whose name is also given to the Lamar Hunt U.S. Open Cup.

The first two editions of the Pioneer Cup were single preseason matches. The inaugural edition was played on March 11, 2007 at Pizza Hut Park (now known as Toyota Stadium), with Columbus defeating Dallas 3–0. Proceeds from the game went to the charity Dallas SCORES. The second edition of the Cup was played on March 20, 2010, at Pizza Hut Park with Dallas defeating Columbus 2–1 in heavy snow.

In 2011, the Pioneer Cup was changed to a two-game, aggregate-goal series played during the regular season. The first leg was played at Columbus Crew Stadium in Columbus, Ohio, on April 1, 2011. The Crew took advantage of FC Dallas going one man down in the 33rd minute to win 2–0. The second and deciding leg was played at Pizza Hut Park in Frisco, Texas, on July 2, 2011, with Dallas winning 2–0. Tied 2–2 on aggregate, Columbus regained the Pioneer Cup with the tie being broken by all-time head-to-head goals, 6–4 in favor of Columbus.

When Major League Soccer restructured scheduling ahead of the 2012 season, Columbus and Dallas would play only once in the regular season. Therefore, the Cup was changed to a one-game, winner-take-all contest. In the event of a draw, the all time head-to-head goals tiebreaker remained. In the 2013 edition, Columbus scored four goals with three different scorers to win the Cup for the second straight year. The 2014 contest was a bit more lackluster than previous encounters. An early summer thunderstorm suspended the start of the match and then eventually postponed it to the following day after a Columbus fan was struck by lightning and injured prior to the game being started. The game was played the next day on a hot afternoon, but no player from either side could find the net in a match then ended scoreless. Due to the scoreless draw, Columbus retained the Cup for the third year in a row due to the all-time head-to-head goals tiebreaker being 12–7 in Columbus' favor.

Columbus played their last match with FC Dallas in 2019 at the Historic Crew Stadium (known as Mapfre Stadium at the time) on March 16, 2019. Columbus would later move to Lower.com Field in July 2021.

In the 2021 MLS season, neither Columbus nor Dallas would play each other for the first time since 2009 due to the small number of inter-conference matches taken place between Eastern and Western conference teams.

== Winners ==
Year	Winner	Columbus pts	Dallas pts	Note
2007	Columbus Crew	3	0	Won in pre-season
2010	FC Dallas	1	2	Won in pre-season
2011	Columbus Crew	2	2	Won via head-to-head goals tie-breaker (6–4)
2012	Columbus Crew	2	1	Won in regular season
2013	Columbus Crew	4	2	Won in regular season
2014	Columbus Crew	1	1	Retained via head-to-head goals tie-breaker (13–8)
2015	FC Dallas	0	3	Won in regular season
2016	Columbus Crew	1	1	Retained via head-to-head goals tie-breaker (14–12)
2017	Columbus Crew	2	1	Won in regular season
2018	Columbus Crew	0	0	Retained via head-to-head goals tie-breaker (16–13)
2019	Columbus Crew	1	0	Won in regular season
2020	Columbus Crew	2	2	Retained via head-to-head goals tie-breaker (19–15)
2021	None	0	0	No matches were held
2022	None	0	0	No matches were held
2023	Columbus Crew	1	1	Retained via head-to-head goals tie-breaker (20–16)
2024	None	0	0	No matches were held
2025	None	0	0	No matches were held
2026	Columbus Crew	2	0	Won in regular season

== Match results ==
Columbus win Dallas win Draw

Date	Venue	Score	Competition	Attendance	Ref.
March 11, 2007	Pizza Hut Park	3–0	Preseason friendly		
March 20, 2010	Pizza Hut Park	2–1	Preseason friendly		
April 1, 2011	Crew Stadium	2–0	MLS regular season	14,459	
July 2, 2011	Pizza Hut Park	2–0	MLS regular season	20,074	
May 12, 2012	Columbus Crew Stadium	2–1	MLS regular season	11,120	
September 29, 2013	FC Dallas Stadium	4–2	MLS regular season	11,422	
June 29, 2014	Columbus Crew Stadium	0–0	MLS regular season	20,617	
September 6, 2015	Mapfre Stadium	3–0	MLS regular season	20,217	
April 2, 2016	Toyota Stadium	1–1	MLS regular season	13,174	
August 26, 2017	Mapfre Stadium	2–1	MLS regular season	18,379	
September 15, 2018	Toyota Stadium	0–0	MLS regular season	16,030	
March 16, 2019	Mapfre Stadium	1–0	MLS regular season	9,687	
October 3, 2020	Toyota Stadium	2–2	MLS regular season	3,572	
September 23, 2023	Toyota Stadium	1–1	MLS regular season	17,948	
October 28, 2026	Toyota Stadium	2–0	MLS regular season	10,925	

CLB wins	Draws	FCD wins
7	5	3
