= Jair Benítez =

Colombian footballer (born 1979)

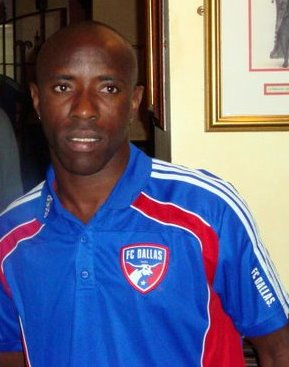

Personal information
- Full name: Jair Benítez Sinisterra
- Date of birth: 11 January 1979 (age 47)
- Place of birth: Jamundí, Colombia
- Height: 5 ft 7 in (1.70 m)
- Position: Left wing-back

Senior career*
Years	Team	Apps	(Gls)
1999	Envigado	42	(4)
2000	Santa Fe	40	(0)
2001	Envigado	16	(0)
2001–2003	Medellín	48	(1)
2003	Deportivo Pereira	21	(4)
2003–2004	Colón Santa Fe	10	(1)
2004–2005	Medellín	80	(7)
2006–2009	Deportivo Cali	99	(2)
2009	→ Medellín (loan)	9	(0)
2009–2014	FC Dallas	159	(2)
2016	Atlético	12	(0)

International career^{‡}
2005–2007	Colombia	7	(0)
- * Club domestic league appearances and goals as of 29 October 2014 ‡ National team caps and goals as of 1 November 2011

Jair “El Chigüiro” Benítez Sinisterra (born 11 January 1980) is a Colombian footballer.

== Career ==
=== Professional ===
The Chigüiro Benítez has spent the majority of his career playing professionally in Colombia, having played 344 games and scoring 19 goals in Colombia's Fútbol Profesional Colombiano. He won a Fútbol Profesional Colombiano title with Independiente Medellín in 2002, and appeared in 17 regular season and Copa Libertadores games for Independiente Medellín in 2009, before signing with FC Dallas of Major League Soccer on 22 July.

Since joining Dallas Benítez has been a key contributor, helping the club to reach the 2010 MLS Cup final.

=== International ===
The Chigüiro Benítez is a full international with the Colombia national football team, and was part of the Colombian squads at the 2005 CONCACAF Gold Cup and the 2007 Copa América.

== Personal ==
The Chigüiro Benítez holds a U.S. green card which qualifies him as a domestic player for MLS roster purposes.

== Honours ==
=== FC Dallas ===
- Major League Soccer Western Conference Championship (1): 2010
