= Schellas Hyndman =

American soccer player-coach (born 1951)

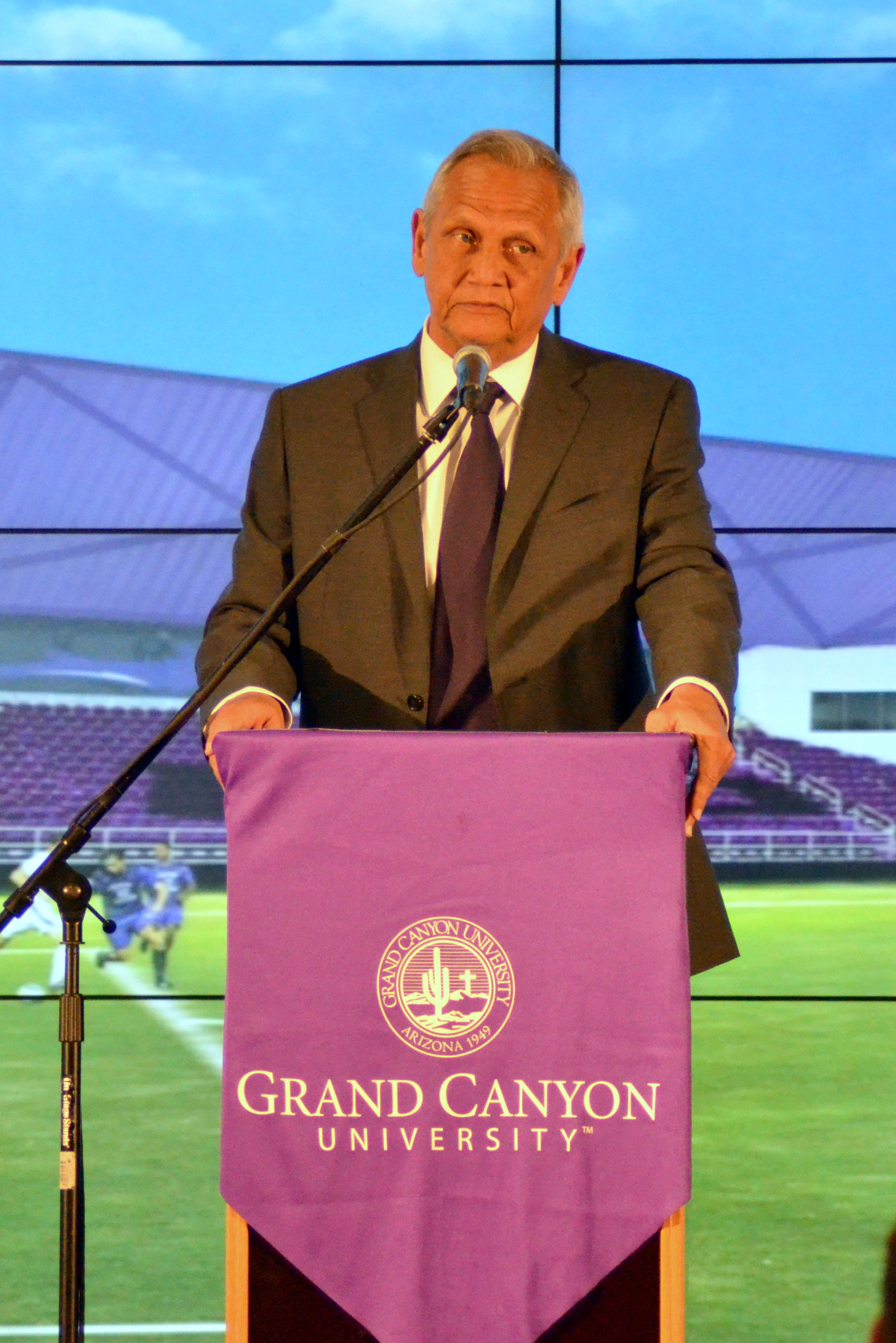

Biographical details
- Born: November 4, 1951 (age 74); Macau
- Education: Eastern Illinois University

Playing career
- 1969–1972: Eastern Illinois
- 1975: Cincinnati Comets

Coaching career (HC unless noted)
- 1974–1975: Murray State
- 1977–1983: Eastern Illinois
- 1984–2008: SMU
- 2008–2013: FC Dallas
- 2015–2021: Grand Canyon

Schellas Hyndman (born November 4, 1951) is a retired soccer coach. He was previously head coach of FC Dallas in Major League Soccer.

Despite having a limited career as a professional athlete, Hyndman is one of the most successful college soccer coaches in American sports history, compiling a 466–122–49 record as the head coach at Southern Methodist University. He was the 1981 NSCAA Coach of the Year.

== Playing career ==
=== Youth and college ===
Hyndman was born in Macau. He was born to a Russian-French mother and a Portuguese father, but after the communist revolution in China his family fled the country in the cargo hold of a ship in 1957. They moved to Springfield, Ohio before settling in Vandalia, Ohio where he attended Butler High School. Following high school, he entered Eastern Illinois University on a soccer scholarship. He was part of the 1969 NAIA national men's soccer championship team as a freshman. He graduated from Eastern Illinois with a bachelor's degree in physical education in 1973.

=== Professional ===
In 1975, Hyndman spent one season as a professional player with the Cincinnati Comets in the American Soccer League.

== Coaching career ==
In the fall of 1973, Hyndman entered Murray State University, graduating with a master's degree in 1975. In addition to taking classes, he also coached the men's soccer team. In 1976, he moved to Sao Paulo, Brazil where he taught at Escola Graduada and served as a staff coach with the São Paulo Futebol Clube. In 1977, he returned to the U.S. to become the head coach at Eastern Illinois University, then competing in the NCAA Division II. Over seven seasons, he compiled a 98–24–11 record. In 1978, Hyndman took the Panthers to third in the NCAA post-season tournament. In 1979, he topped that as Eastern Illinois finished runner-up to Alabama A&M. In 1981, the team moved up to the NCAA Division I, taking third place in the 1981 Division I tournament. That led to his being selected as the 1981 NSCAA Coach of the Year. He was inducted into the Eastern Illinois Athletic Hall of Fame in 2001.

In 1984, Southern Methodist University hired Hyndman as head coach of the Mustangs soccer team. Over the next twenty-four seasons, he compiled a 368–96–38 record, earning eight league Coach of the Year honors, five regional Coach of the Year honors.

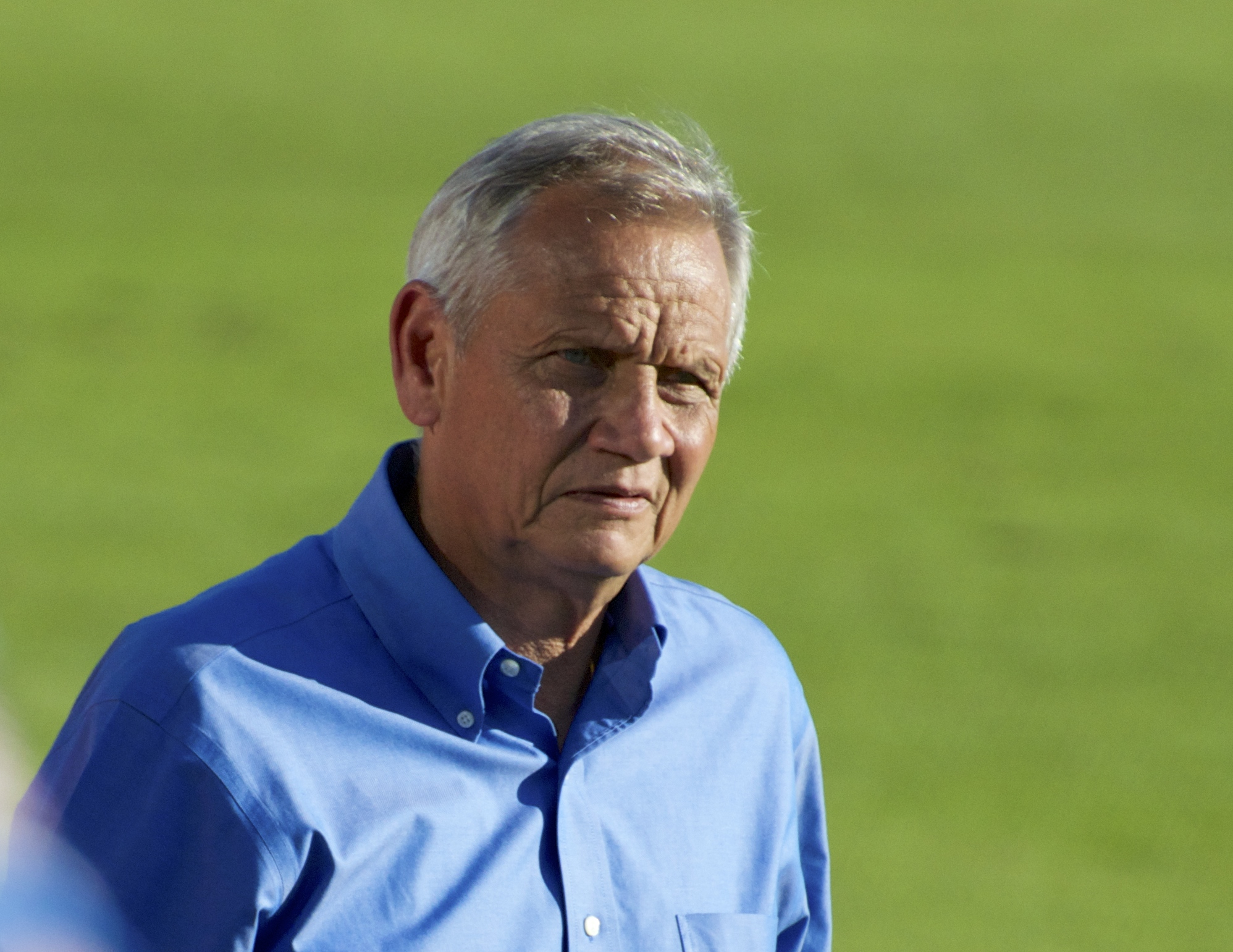
Coaching FC Dallas in October 2013

On June 16, 2008, FC Dallas of Major League Soccer hired Hyndman as head coach after the sacking of Steve Morrow. In 2010, he coached Dallas to the MLS Cup Final, losing to Colorado Rapids. Hyndman resigned following the 2013 season.

On January 13, 2015, he was named head men's soccer coach at Grand Canyon University. In 2018, Grand Canyon became the third school he led into the NCAA Division I Men's Soccer Championship.

=== Administration ===
In 2001, Hyndman was selected to serve as a member of the NSCAA Executive Committee. In January 2005, he became President of the NSCAA, serving in that capacity for one year.

== Personal life ==
Hyndman is also an established Aiki Ju-Jutsu coach, and has been teaching the discipline for over 25 years in the Dallas area. Hyndman is a 10th degree black belt with Juko Kai Int'o. He is married to Kami Hyndman and has three children. His grandson Emerson Hyndman played for Atlanta United of Major League Soccer.

== Coaching career statistics ==
As of May 18, 2012

Team	From	To	Record^{1}				
Team	From	To	G	W	L	T	Win %
FC Dallas	June 16, 2008	October 26, 2013	180	63	58	59	35.00
Total			180	63	58	59	35.00

- 1.Includes league, playoffs, cup and CONCACAF Champions League.

=== College ===
Record table
Season	Team	Overall	Conference	Standing	Postseason
Eastern Illinois University (Division II Independent) (1977–1980)
1977	EIU Panthers	10–4–1			Lost 2nd round
1978	EIU Panthers	15–5–0			3rd Div. II
1979	EIU Panthers	14–4–3			Div. II Runner-Up
1980	EIU Panthers	12–4–0			Lost 1st round
Eastern Illinois University (Division I Independent) (1981–1982)
1981	EIU Panthers	19–2–2			3rd Place (Vacated by NCAA)
1982	EIU Panthers	12–3–5			Lost 1st round
Eastern Illinois University (Association of Mid-Continent Universities) (1983–1983)
1983	EIU Panthers	16–2–0	4–0–0	1st	Lost 2nd round
EIU Panthers:		98–24–11 (.778)	4–0–0		
Southern Methodist University (Division I Independent) (1983–1995)
1983	SMU Mustangs	10–7–3			Lost 1st round
1984	SMU Mustangs	10–4–3			Lost 2nd round
1985	SMU Mustangs	17–5–0			Lost Elite 8
1986	SMU Mustangs	15–2–2			Lost Elite 8
1987	SMU Mustangs	13–4–1			Lost 2nd round
1988	SMU Mustangs	12–3–6			Lost Elite 8
1989	SMU Mustangs	15–5–0			Lost 2nd round
1990	SMU Mustangs	18–4–1			Lost Elite 8
1991	SMU Mustangs	16–4–1			Lost Elite 8
1992	SMU Mustangs	15–3–3			Lost Elite 8
1993	SMU Mustangs	11–8–0			
1994	SMU Mustangs	15–4–1			Lost 2nd round
1995	SMU Mustangs	16–4–1			Lost Elite 8
Southern Methodist University (Western Athletic Conference) (1996–1999)
1996	SMU Mustangs	14–5–1	6–1–1	t-2nd	Lost 1st round
1997	SMU Mustangs	19–2–1	7–1–0	1st	Lost Elite 8
1998	SMU Mustangs	15–5–1	7–0–1	1st	Lost 1st round
1999	SMU Mustangs	16–4–0	9–1–0	1st	Lost 2nd round
Southern Methodist University (Missouri Valley Conference) (2000–2004)
2000	SMU Mustangs	20–5–0	10–1–0	1st	3rd Place
2001	SMU Mustangs	21–1–0	9–0–0	1st	Lost Elite 8
2002	SMU Mustangs	16–1–5	7–0–2	1st	Lost 3rd round
2003	SMU Mustangs	13–6–3	4–5–0	7th	Lost 3rd round
2004	SMU Mustangs	16–4–1	8–0–0	1st	Lost 1st round
Southern Methodist University (Conference USA) (2005–present)
2005	SMU Mustangs	14–6–3	8–1–0	1st	3rd Place
2006	SMU Mustangs	17–2–4	5–1–3	1st	Lost 2nd round
SMU Mustangs:		368–94–40 (.770)	80–11–7		
Grand Canyon University (Western Athletic Conference) (2015–future)
2015	Grand Canyon Antelopes	7–10–0	3–7–0	10 of 11	
2016	Grand Canyon Antelopes	7–9–3	4–3–3	5 of 11	
2017	Grand Canyon Antelopes	7–11–1	4–5–1	6 of 11	
2018	Grand Canyon Antelopes	12–8–1	6–4–0	4 of 12	WAC Champions; NCAA First Round
Grand Canyon Antelopes:		33–38–3 .466	17–20–4		
Total:		499–156–56 .741			
National champion Postseason invitational champion Conference regular season champion Conference regular season and conference tournament champion Division regular season champion Division regular season and conference tournament champion Conference tournament champion
