= Daniel Hernández (soccer, born 1976) =

American soccer player

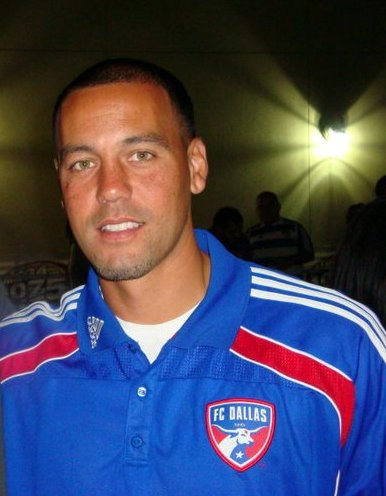

Personal information
- Full name: Daniel Demetrio Hernández
- Date of birth: July 23, 1976 (age 50)
- Place of birth: Tyler, Texas, United States
- Height: 6 ft 0 in (1.83 m)
- Positions: Defender; midfielder

Youth career
- 1990–1994: Dallas Texans

College career
Years	Team	Apps	(Gls)
1994–1997	SMU Mustangs		

Senior career*
Years	Team	Apps	(Gls)
1998–1999	Los Angeles Galaxy	29	(0)
1999–2000	Tampa Bay Mutiny	4	(0)
2000–2002	MetroStars	40	(1)
2002–2003	New England Revolution	28	(3)
2003–2005	Necaxa	50	(3)
2005–2007	New England Revolution	14	(0)
2007	Puebla	7	(1)
2008	Chiapas	24	(0)
2009	Necaxa	6	(0)
2009–2012	FC Dallas	89	(2)
Total		291	(10)

Managerial career
- 2012: FC Dallas (assistant)
- * Club domestic league appearances and goals as of November 21, 2012

Daniel Demetrio Hernández (born July 23, 1976, in Tyler, Texas) is an American former soccer player.

== Career ==
=== Youth and college ===
Hernández was a student at John Tyler High School and played youth soccer for the Dallas Texans Soccer Club. He played college soccer and college football as a placekicker at Southern Methodist University from 1994 to 1997, where he was a First Team All-American as an attacking midfielder.

=== Professional ===
Upon graduating from SMU, Hernández was drafted in the second round of the 1998 MLS College Draft by the Los Angeles Galaxy of Major League Soccer. He saw little playing time in the Galaxy, appearing mostly a substitute, before being traded to the Tampa Bay Mutiny in exchange for Jorge Salcedo. Hernández hardly played for the Mutiny either, appearing in only four games, and was traded the next year to the MetroStars for the rights to Daniel Alvarez.

With the MetroStars, Hernández finally came into his own, earning a starting position, first in central defense, and then becoming one of the league's most dangerous defensive midfielders. He stayed with the MetroStars from 2000 to 2002, but was a part of a blockbuster trade in the middle of 2002, which sent him along with Brian Kamler and Diego Serna to the New England Revolution for Mamadou Diallo, Andy Williams, and Ted Chronopoulos. Despite being a starter for the Revolution, Hernández expressed displeasure with his situation, requesting a trade to his home state Dallas Burn. The Burn, however, were unwilling to make such a trade, and upon the emergence of an adequate replacement for him in Shalrie Joseph, Hernández was transferred to Mexican club Necaxa mid-season 2003. In six seasons in MLS, he totalled four goals and 15 assists in league play.

To the surprise of many, Hernández – called Demetrio in Mexico – earned a starting position as a central defender on the club. According to Hernández, his profile in his hometown of Tyler has increased enormously since his arrival in the Primera División. However, in 2005, he came back to MLS, re-signing with New England. In 2007, he was waived by the Revolution.

After brief stints back in Mexico with Puebla and Chiapas F.C. in 2007 and 2008, Hernández signed with FC Dallas in September 2009. With Dallas, Hernandez has been a key player playing as the team's primary defensive midfielder. Following the 2011 season, Hernández signed an extension with the club that saw him also become an assistant coach as part of a transition out of his playing career.

Hernández announced his retirement from playing professional soccer on November 21, 2012.

=== Coaching ===
Upon retiring as a player, it was announced Hernández would have a full-time coaching role, also with FC Dallas. However, just a few weeks after being hired Hernández was fired from his coaching job with FC Dallas.

== Honors ==
=== Los Angeles Galaxy ===
- Major League Soccer Supporters' Shield (1): 1998

=== MetroStars ===
- Major League Soccer Eastern Conference Championship (1): 2000

=== New England Revolution ===
- Major League Soccer Eastern Conference Championship (3): 2002, 2005, 2006

=== FC Dallas ===
- Major League Soccer Western Conference Championship (1): 2010
