= 2010 Colorado Rapids season =

Colorado Rapids
2010 season
- Owner: Stan Kroenke
- Coach: Gary Smith
- Major League Soccer: 7th
- MLS Cup: Champions
- U.S. Open Cup: Did not qualify
- Rocky Mountain Cup: Runners-up
- Average home league attendance: 13,329
- Biggest win: COL 4-1 PHI (9/29)
- Biggest defeat: CLB 3-1 COL (8/21); RBNY 3-1 COL (9/11)
Home colors	Away colors

The 2010 Colorado Rapids season was the fifteenth year and season of the club's existence. It was Colorado's fifteenth year in Major League Soccer, and the fifteenth consecutive year for the club in the top-flight of American soccer.

Following a disappointing ninth-place finish in the regular season, head coach Gary Smith began to revamp and overhaul the roster, making numerous inexpensive moves to sign low-key MLS players to fit the salary cap demands at one of few franchises with no Designated Players. The Rapids were able to improve slightly in the MLS regular season, finishing in seventh place, scoring fifteen goals and conceding only four in their last six home games. The team finished their final ten league matches with a 4–3–3 record. In the MLS Cup Playoffs, Colorado were seeded in the Eastern Conference and defeated Columbus in a penalty shoot out. They then won 1–0 against San Jose at home, in a one leg tie, for the conference championship. The Rapids advanced to the MLS Cup final and defeated FC Dallas 2–1 after extra time for their first league championship. As of 2024, this remains the most recent of the Rapids' two MLS Cup finals appearances, and the sole trophy won in club history.

In addition to MLS and MLS Cup Playoffs, Colorado advanced through the qualification rounds of the U.S. Open Cup before being knocked out 3-0 by New York in the fourth round.

== Review ==
=== March ===
Colorado began their sixth Major League Soccer regular season on the road with a 1–0 win against Chivas USA on March 28, 2010.

=== April ===
Colorado played their first home match against the Chicago Fire on April 3, earning a point in a 2–2 draw.

=== October ===
The Rapids entered the 2010 MLS Cup Playoffs as the third seed in the Eastern Conference, despite playing in the Western Conference. In the Conference Semifinals, Colorado defeated the Columbus Crew at home 1–0 in the first of two legs.

=== November ===
The Rapids played the second leg of their Conference Semifinal matchup in Columbus. After 90 minutes of play, the Crew were on top 2–1, meaning the two teams were tied on aggregate goals 2-2. After playing a scoreless extra period, the two teams went into a penalty shootout, where the Rapids would prevail 5–4. Colorado would follow up with a home win over the San Jose Earthquakes in the Conference Final to advance to the Cup Final.

MLS Cup 2010 was played on a neutral field at BMO Field, home of Toronto FC. The Rapids faced off against FC Dallas, the third seed in the Western Conference. The teams would go into extra time, where the match was decided by an own goal from FC Dallas defender George John in the 107th minute. The Rapids would win the match 2–1, and won their first MLS Cup in club history.

== Match results ==
Win Tie Loss

=== Preseason ===
March 9, 2010	Arsenal F.C. Reserves	0–1	Colorado Rapids	Hertfordshire, England
GMT		Report	Casey 52'	Stadium: Arsenal Training Centre

=== MLS regular season ===
March 27, 2010	Chivas USA	0–1	Colorado Rapids	Carson, California
19:30 PDT	Romero (yellow card) 37'	Report	Larentowicz (yellow card) 48'; Cummings 55'	Stadium: The Home Depot Center; Attendance: 18,653; Referee: Michael Kennedy

April 3, 2010	Colorado Rapids	2–2	Chicago Fire	Commerce City, Colorado
2:00 MT	Cummings 12'; Wynne (yellow card) 22'; Clark (yellow card) 31'; Casey 41'; Earls (yellow card) 42'; Cummings (yellow card) 57'	Report	John 25'; Pappa (yellow card) 42'; McBride 50' (pen.)	Stadium: Dick's Sporting Goods Park; Attendance: 11,641; Referee: Terry Vaughn

April 10, 2010	Kansas City Wizards	1–0	Colorado Rapids	Kansas City, Kansas
7:30PM	Kamara (yellow card) 39' (goal) 48'; Smith (yellow card) 45'	Report	Baudet (yellow card) 43' (red card) 72'; Mastroeni (yellow card) 44'	Stadium: CommunityAmerica Ballpark; Attendance: 10,228; Referee: Landis Wiley

April 18, 2010	Colorado Rapids	3–1	Toronto FC	Commerce City, Colorado
	Casey 24' (pen.); Larentowicz 71'; Casey 85' (pen.)	Report	Šarić (yellow card) 45'; De Rosario 58' (pen.); Usanov (yellow card) 84'	Stadium: Dick's Sporting Goods Park; Attendance: 9,928; Referee: Ricardo Salazar

April 24, 2010	New England Revolution	1–2	Colorado Rapids	Foxborough, Massachusetts
	Perovic 19'; Phelan (yellow card) 48'	Report	Ballouchy 14'; Mastroeni (yellow card) 66' (goal) 73'	Stadium: Gillette Stadium; Attendance: 8,142; Referee: Jair Marrufo

May 1, 2010	San Jose Earthquakes	1–0	Colorado Rapids	Santa Clara, California
	Wondolowski 33'; Leitch (yellow card) 87'; Convey (yellow card) 93+'	Report	Thompson (yellow card) 94+'	Stadium: Buck Shaw Stadium; Attendance: 8,674; Referee: Baldomero Toledo

May 5, 2010	Colorado Rapids	0–1	Los Angeles Galaxy	Commerce City, Colorado
	Ballouchy (yellow card) 30'; Cummings (yellow card) 64'; Casey (yellow card) 77'	Report	Gordon 21'; Juninho (yellow card) 31'; Buddle (yellow card) 89'	Stadium: Dick's Sporting Goods Park; Attendance: 9,882; Referee: Edvin Jurisevic

May 15, 2010	D.C. United	0–1	Colorado Rapids	Washington, D.C.
	Castillo (yellow card) 16'; Christman (yellow card) 73'	Report	Mastroeni (yellow card) 57'; Ballouchy 67' (yellow card) 90'; LaBauex (yellow card) 94+'	Stadium: RFK Stadium; Attendance: 13,570; Referee: Jorge Gonzalez

May 29, 2010	Colorado Rapids	1–0	Seattle Sounders FC	Commerce City, Colorado
	Casey (yellow card) 90' (goal) 63'; Mastroeni (yellow card) 45'; Wynne (yellow card) 71'	Report	González (yellow card) 45'; Ianni (yellow card) 53'; Lungberg (yellow card) 53'	Stadium: Dick's Sporting Goods Park; Attendance: 18,116; Referee: Jair Marrufo

June 5, 2010	Colorado Rapids	1–0	Columbus Crew	Commerce City, Colorado
	Casey (yellow card) 43'; Baudet (yellow card) 58'; Mastroeni (red card) 76'; Moor 85'	Report	Moffat (yellow card) 40'; Lenhard (yellow card) 76'; Remteroa (yellow card) 87'	Stadium: Dick's Sporting Goods Park; Attendance: 14,318; Referee: Kevin Stott

June 9, 2010	Chicago Fire	2–2	Colorado Rapids	Bridgeview, Illinois
	Pappa 23', 46'	Report	Cummings 21'; Casey 91'	Stadium: Toyota Park; Attendance: 13,607; Referee: Paul Ward

June 26, 2010	Houston Dynamo	2–2	Colorado Rapids	Houston, Texas
	Ching (yellow card) 7'; Cruz 17'; Ngwenya 80'	Report	Casey 45'; Larentowicz (yellow card) 68'; Palmer 71' (o.g.)	Stadium: Robertson Stadium; Attendance: 13,744; Referee: Mark Geiger

July 4, 2010	Colorado Rapids	1–1	New York Red Bulls	Commerce City, Colorado
1:51	Cummings 15'; Cummings (yellow card) 71'; Clark (yellow card) 87'	Report	Angel 34'; Stammler (yellow card) 67'	Stadium: Dick's Sporting Goods Park; Attendance: 18,363; Referee: Baldomero Toledo

July 10, 2010	Toronto FC	1–0	Colorado Rapids	Toronto, Ontario, Canada
1:54	Gargan (yellow card) 20'; Ibrahim 61'	Report		Stadium: BMO Field; Attendance: 21,836; Referee: Ricardo Salazar

July 17, 2010	Colorado Rapids	1–1	Kansas City Wizards	Commerce City, Colorado
	Arnaud 20'; Kamara (yellow card) 43'	Report	Palguta (yellow card) 36'; Casey 74'	Stadium: Dick's Sporting Goods Park; Attendance: 12,825; Referee: Michael Kennedy

July 25, 2010	Seattle Sounders FC	2–1	Colorado Rapids	Seattle, Washington
	Zakuani 8', 17'; Scott (yellow card) 28'; Alonso (yellow card) 90'	Report	Cummings 9'; Smith (yellow card) 58'	Stadium: Qwest Field; Attendance: 36,333; Referee: Yader Reyes

July 31, 2010	Colorado Rapids	1–1	FC Dallas	Commerce City, Colorado
	Ballouchy 26' (pen.)	Report	Beaudet 9' (o.g.); Chavez (yellow card) 77'	Stadium: Dick's Sporting Goods Park; Attendance: 10,596; Referee: Alex Prus

August 7, 2010	Colorado Rapids	1–0	San Jose Earthquakes	Commerce City, Colorado
1:53	Busch 26' (o.g.)	Report		Stadium: Dick's Sporting Goods Park; Attendance: 12,701; Referee: Hilario Grajeda

August 14, 2010	Philadelphia Union	1–1	Colorado Rapids	Chester, Pennsylvania
1:52	Larentowicz (yellow card) 20'; Larentowicz 59'; Cummings (yellow card) 66'; Pickens (yellow card) 71'; Smith (yellow card) 85'	Report	Mwanga 73'	Stadium: PPL Park; Attendance: 17,749; Referee: Terry Vaughn

August 21, 2010	Columbus Crew	3–1	Colorado Rapids	Columbus, Ohio
	Schelotto 6' (pen.); Hejduk (yellow card) 22'; Garey 53'; Moffat (yellow card) 75'; Lenhart 80'	Report	Mastroeni 46+'	Stadium: Columbus Crew Stadium; Attendance: 16,063; Referee: Edvin Jurisevic

August 28, 2010	Colorado Rapids	3–0	Houston Dynamo	Commerce City, Colorado
1:48	Smith 2'; Busch (yellow card) 11'; Cummings 16'; Casey 23'; Casey (yellow card) 72'	Report	Busch (red card) 10'; Cruz 70'	Stadium: Dick's Sporting Goods Park; Attendance: 11,511; Referee: Abiodun Okulaja

September 4, 2010	Colorado Rapids	3–0	Chivas USA	Commerce City, Colorado
	Casey 51'; Cummings 68', 80'	Report	Gordon (yellow card) 39'; Cuesta (yellow card) 60'	Stadium: Dick's Sporting Goods Park; Attendance: 10,312; Referee: Michael Kennedy

September 11, 2010	New York Red Bulls	3–1	Colorado Rapids	Harrison, New Jersey
	Henry 17'; Albright (yellow card) 30'; Ream 32'; Richards 58'	Report	(yellow card) 10' Wallace; (yellow card) 27' Smith; 52' Cummings; (yellow card) 70' Thompson	Stadium: Red Bull Arena; Attendance: 19,014; Referee: Baldomero Toledo

September 18, 2010	Colorado Rapids	3–0	New England Revolution	Commerce City, Colorado
7:00 PM MDT	Cummings 5'; Casey 35'; Thompson 83' (yellow card) 84'	Report	Sinovic (yellow card) 67'	Stadium: Dick's Sporting Goods Park; Attendance: 16,314; Referee: Mark Geiger

September 25, 2010	Real Salt Lake	1–1	Colorado Rapids	Sandy, Utah
10:00 p.m. EDT	Campos (yellow card) 32'; Espíndola (yellow card) 66'; Warner (yellow card) 78'; Borchers 90'	Report	Casey (yellow card) 10' (goal) 36'; Wynne (yellow card) 16'; Wallace (yellow card) 82'	Stadium: Rio Tinto Stadium; Attendance: 18,317; Referee: Ramón Hernández

September 29, 2010	Colorado Rapids	4–1	Philadelphia Union	Commerce City, Colorado
9:30 p.m. EDT	Cummings 8' 15' Thompson 68' Amarikwa 86'		Califf (yellow card) 10'; McInerney 90'	Stadium: Dick's Sporting Goods Park; Attendance: 10,165; Referee: Baldomero Toledo

October 2, 2010	Colorado Rapids	0–1	D.C. United	Commerce City, Colorado
	Palguta (yellow card) 15'		Allsopp 45+2'; McTavish (yellow card) 74'; Najar (yellow card) 85'	Stadium: Dick's Sporting Goods Park; Attendance: 15,478; Referee: Michael Kennedy

October 9, 2010	FC Dallas	2–2	Colorado Rapids	Frisco, Texas
7:30 PM CDT	Rodriguez 27'; Ferreira 37'	Report	13', 51' Larentowicz	Stadium: Pizza Hut Park; Attendance: 10,119; Referee: Paul Ward

October 16, 2010	Los Angeles Galaxy	1–3	Colorado Rapids	Carson, California
	Buddle 9'		Buddle 18' (o.g.); Thompson (yellow card) 24'; Casey 30', (yellow card) 35'; Cummings 67'	Stadium: Home Depot Center; Attendance: 27,000

October 23, 2010	Colorado Rapids	2–2	Real Salt Lake	Commerce City, Colorado
	Cummings 16'; Casey 50'		Saborio 90', 90'	Stadium: Dick's Sporting Goods Park; Attendance: 17,729

=== MLS Cup Playoffs ===
October 28, 2010 Conf. Semifinals	Colorado Rapids	1–0	Columbus Crew	Commerce City, Colorado
9:00 PM EDT	Mastroeni 23' (yellow card) 92+'	Report	Carroll (yellow card) 57'	Stadium: Dick's Sporting Goods Park; Attendance: 11,872; Referee: (California) Jair Marrufo

November 6, 2010 Conf. Semifinals	Columbus Crew	2–1 (a.e.t.) (2–2 agg.) (4–5 p)	Colorado Rapids	Columbus, Ohio
4:00 PM EDT	Gaven 22'; Schelotto (yellow card) 31'; Ekpo (yellow card) 52'; Carroll (yellow card) 56'; Francis (yellow card) 64'; Rogers 70'; Rogers (yellow card) 70'	Report	Mullan (yellow card) 38'; Casey (yellow card) 48'; Casey 84'	Stadium: Crew Stadium; Attendance: 10,322; Referee: (New Jersey) Michael Kennedy
	Penalties
	Schelotto (penalty scored); Garey (penalty scored); Gaven (penalty scored); Brunner (penalty scored); Carroll (penalty missed)		Casey (penalty scored); Kandji (penalty scored); Larentowicz (penalty scored); Lopez (penalty scored); Smith (penalty scored)

November 13, 2010 Conf. Finals	Colorado Rapids	1–0	San Jose Earthquakes	Commerce City, Colorado
7:30 PM MDT	Kimura 43'	Report		Stadium: Dick's Sporting Goods Park; Attendance: 17,779; Referee: (Texas) Jorge Gonzalez

November 21, 2010 Final	Colorado Rapids	2–1	FC Dallas	Toronto, Ontario, Canada
6:30 PM MDT	Wallace (yellow card) 41'; Smith (yellow card) 51'; Casey 57' (yellow card) 84'; John 106' (o.g.)	Report	35' Ferreira; (yellow card) 84' Benitez	Stadium: BMO Field; Attendance: 21,700; Referee: Baldamaro Toledo

=== U.S. Open Cup ===
April 13, 2010 Qualification	Kansas City Wizards	1–2	Colorado Rapids	Kansas City, Missouri
7:30PM	Bunbury 4'	Report	Thompson 24', 81'	Stadium: Stanley H. Durwood Soccer Stadium; Attendance: 1226; Referee: Tony Russo

May 26, 2010 Qualification	New York Red Bulls (New York (state))	3–0	Colorado Rapids	Harrison, New Jersey
	Wolyniec 11', 43'; Chinn 56'; Stammler (yellow card) 77'	Report	Larentowicz (yellow card) 11'; Thompson (yellow card) 54'; Earls (red card) 86'	Stadium: Red Bull Arena; Attendance: 2,637; Referee: Niko Bratsis

== League table ==
Conference

Pos	Team	Pld	W	L	T	GF	GA	GD	Pts	Qualification
1	LA Galaxy	30	18	7	5	44	26	+18	59	Qualification for the conference semifinals
2	Real Salt Lake	30	15	4	11	45	20	+25	56	Qualification for the conference semifinals
3	FC Dallas	30	12	4	14	42	28	+14	50	Qualification for the conference semifinals
4	Seattle Sounders FC	30	14	10	6	39	35	+4	48	Qualification for the conference semifinals
5	Colorado Rapids	30	12	8	10	44	32	+12	46	Qualification for the conference semifinals
6	San Jose Earthquakes	30	13	10	7	34	33	+1	46	Qualification for the conference semifinals
7	Houston Dynamo	30	9	15	6	40	49	−9	33	
8	Chivas USA	30	8	18	4	31	45	−14	28	

Source: MLS

Overall

Pos	Team	Pld	W	L	T	GF	GA	GD	Pts	
1	LA Galaxy (S)	30	18	7	5	44	26	+18	59	Qualification for the CONCACAF Champions League
2	Real Salt Lake	30	15	4	11	45	20	+25	56	
3	New York Red Bulls	30	15	9	6	38	29	+9	51	
4	FC Dallas	30	12	4	14	42	28	+14	50	Qualification for the CONCACAF Champions League
5	Columbus Crew	30	14	8	8	40	34	+6	50	
6	Seattle Sounders FC (U)	30	14	10	6	39	35	+4	48	Qualification for the CONCACAF Champions League
7	Colorado Rapids (C)	30	12	8	10	44	32	+12	46	Qualification for the CONCACAF Champions League
8	San Jose Earthquakes	30	13	10	7	34	33	+1	46	
9	Kansas City Wizards	30	11	13	6	36	35	+1	39	
10	Chicago Fire	30	9	12	9	37	38	−1	36	
11	Toronto FC (V)	30	9	13	8	33	41	−8	35	Qualification for the CONCACAF Champions League
12	Houston Dynamo	30	9	15	6	40	49	−9	33	
13	New England Revolution	30	9	16	5	32	50	−18	32	
14	Philadelphia Union	30	8	15	7	35	49	−14	31	
15	Chivas USA	30	8	18	4	31	45	−14	28	
16	D.C. United	30	6	20	4	21	47	−26	22	

Source: MLS
Rules for classification: 1) points; 2) head-to-head record; 3) goal difference; 4) number of goals scored
(C) MLS Cup champions; (S) Supporters' Shield winners; (U) U.S. Open Cup winners; (V) Canadian Championship winners

=== Results summary ===
Overall								Home						Away					
Pld	Pts	W	L	T	GF	GA	GD	W	L	T	GF	GA	GD	W	L	T	GF	GA	GD
4	7	2	1	1	6	4	+2	1	0	1	5	3	+2	1	1	0	1	1	0

Last updated: April 21, 2009
Source: Major League Soccer
Pld = Matches played; Pts = Points; W = Matches won; T = Matches tied; L = Matches lost; GF = Goals for; GA = Goals against; GD = Goal difference

Round	1	2	3	4	5	6	7	8	9	10	11	12	13	14	15	16	17	18	19	20	21	22	23	24	25	26	27	28	29	30
Stadium	A	H	A	H	A	A	H	A	A	H	H	A	H	A	H	H	A	H	H	A	A	H	H	A	H	A	H	A	A	H
Result	W	T	L	W	W	L	L	W	W	W	T	T	T	L	T	L	T	W	T	L	W	W	L	W	T					
Position	5	5	9	5	4	6	7	7	4	4	4	4	5	5	6	6	6	6	7	7	7	6	7	7						

Updated to match(es) played on April 21, 2010. Source: MLS Results and League table
A = Away; H = Home; W = Win; L = Loss; T = Tie

== Squad ==
=== Roster ===
As of May 5, 2010.

Note: Flags indicate national team as defined under FIFA eligibility rules; some limited exceptions apply. Players may hold more than one non-FIFA nationality.

No.	Pos.	Nation	Player
2	DF	IRL	Danny Earls
3	DF	USA	Drew Moor
4	MF	USA	Jeff Larentowicz
6	DF	USA	Anthony Wallace
7	FW	ARG	Claudio López
9	FW	USA	Conor Casey
10	FW	SEN	Macoumba Kandji
11	MF	USA	Brian Mullan
12	FW	USA	Quincy Amarikwa
13	FW	USA	Ross Schunk
14	FW	JAM	Omar Cummings
15	MF	USA	Wells Thompson
16	MF	USA	Ross LaBauex

No.	Pos.	Nation	Player
17	GK	USA	Ian Joyce
18	GK	USA	Matt Pickens
19	FW	USA	Andre Akpan
20	MF	SCO	Jamie Smith
21	DF	FRA	Julien Baudet
22	DF	USA	Marvell Wynne
23	MF	USA	Ciaran O'Brien
25	MF	USA	Pablo Mastroeni (captain)
27	MF	JPN	Kosuke Kimura
28	MF	USA	Davy Armstrong
29	DF	USA	Scott Palguta
31	GK	HAI	Steward Ceus
