= 2010 FC Dallas season =

FC Dallas
2010 season
- Owner: Clark Hunt
- Head coach: Schellas Hyndman
- Major League Soccer: 4th
- MLS Cup: Runners-Up
- U.S. Open Cup: Did not qualify
- Texas Derby: Champions
- Pioneer Cup: Champions
- Highest home attendance: 21,193 vs. Inter Milan (August 6, 2010) (Exhibition); 15,993 vs. Kansas City Wizards (July 3, 2010)
- Lowest home attendance: 8,016 vs. Houston (March 27, 2010)
- Average home league attendance: 10,617
Home colors	Away colors

The 2010 FC Dallas season was the fifteenth season of the team's existence.

Dallas' season was highlighted by qualifying for the first MLS Cup Final in franchise history, where they ultimately came up short, losing to the Colorado Rapids in extra time, from an own goal by George John who inadvertently deflected a ball into his own net. In spite of the MLS Cup shortcomings, Dallas earned a preliminary spot in the 2011–12 edition of the CONCACAF Champions League, for next year.

During the regular season, the club set a team record for longest home unbeaten streak, with six matches. Additionally, during this unbeaten streak from May to October, Dallas set an MLS record for longest road unbeaten streak (11 matches) and overall unbeaten streak (15) before eventually losing to Real Salt Lake towards the end of the season. The unbeaten streak, gave Dallas their best regular season record since 2007. David Ferreira of Dallas was crowned the league's Most Valuable Player.

Outside of MLS, the club a short-lived spell in the U.S. Open Cup play-in proper. In an April 28 qualification match against D.C. United, the club, fielded primarily by reserves, lost 4–2.

As of 2024, this remains FC Dallas' only MLS Cup final appearance, making the club one of three surviving original MLS franchises to never have won the title (alongside New England Revolution and New York Red Bulls) and of the 10 existing teams founded before 2005 to not have done so. At the time of their MLS Cup loss, the club had also never won a trophy; this was rectified in 2016, when they won a domestic double of the Supporters' Shield and the U.S. Open Cup, the last of these same 10 teams to win silverware.

== Review ==
=== March ===
Dallas began their fifteenth Major League Soccer regular season with a 1–1 draw in a home match against the Houston Dynamo on March 27, 2009.

=== August ===
FC Dallas hosted a friendly against the 2009–10 UEFA Champions League Champions Inter Milan on August 5, 2010.

=== September ===
The month of September saw Dallas obtain several landmark records for their club and for the MLS. As of September 21, 2010, those records are:

Longest Active Home Winning Streak – 6 Games – Club Record – ending with their tie at home to New York Red Bulls

Longest Road Unbeaten Streak – 11 Games – MLS & Club Record

Longest Active Unbeaten Streak – 15 Games – MLS & Club Record

In September, a heated match with New York Red Bulls on September 16 produced well-publicized controversy. New York Red Bulls forward & designated player, Thierry Henry injured FC Dallas goalie Kevin Hartman in celebration of the Red Bulls' first goal of the evening by Mehdi Ballouchy in the 48+ minute of the match.. Henry kicked the ball after the play had ended. FC Dallas goalkeeper Kevin Hartman was on the other side of the ball and suffered a knee injury as a result. The Disciplinary Committee determined Henry's action to be unsporting and issued a $2,000 fine.

As a result of Henry's actions, FC Dallas coach Schellas Hyndman spoke out against the referees decision; saying it showed a "lack of courage". Further controversy was ignited following the MLS Disciplinary Committee's decision to fine Henry with no suspension preceding New York Red Bull's next match against star-studded Los Angeles Galaxy. FC Dallas player Brek Shea, however, was fined $1000, red-carded and suspended for an additional game during the same match.

=== October ===
On October 2, the club qualified for the playoffs for the first time since 2007. They qualified following a 2–1 victory at Gillette Stadium against the New England.

The regular season ended on a rough patch for the Toros, as they would have to travel for away games against Los Angeles Galaxy and Real Salt Lake; at the time the first-place and second-place clubs in the league, respectively. The two game-trip ended in a pair of back-to-back losses for Dallas on October 17 and 23, and ultimately ended their chance for winning the Supporters' Shield.

Amid controversy surrounding the playoff's format, Dallas was the third seed Western Conference bracket, drawn against the second-place West club and MLS Cup defending champions, Real Salt Lake.

The Conference Semifinals served as a two-leg, home and away aggregate series with no away goals rule enforced. Dallas hosted Salt Lake on October 30. Despite an early goal from Fabian Espindola in the fifth-minute, the Toros would rally with a pair of goals from Jeff Cunningham and Eric Avila, giving not only them victory, but a lead in the a series.

=== November ===
The first leg of the quarterfinals was played at FC Dallas' home ground Pizza Hut Park on October 30, in the northern Dallas suburb of Frisco. Early in the match, Salt Lake striker Fabián Espíndola bagged a fifth-minute goal to give the visitors a critical away goal and a 1–0 lead in the match and on aggregate. The team rebounded from the setback thanks to a 44th-minute equalizer from Jeff Cunningham. Shortly into the second half, things looked more promising for Dallas when a dangerous sliding tackle in the 49th minute from Salt Lake's midfielder Javier Morales resulted in an immediate red-card ejection from the match, resulting in the Royals having to play a man down. Kittian international, Atiba Harris was ejected in the 88th minute, causing a 10 vs. 10 match for the final two minutes before injury time. While things were looking to stay on parity for the first leg, a last-minute goal from Dallas' Eric Avila gave the Toros a needed 2–1 victory over RSL.

Our midfield has been tremendous this year. We're getting the best out of Daniel Hernandez. He's not just the anchor back in the middle third, but he's also the captain of the team as well, a bit of an inspirational player and also my right hand on the field.

— Schellas Hyndman, FC Dallas head coach

Dallas traveled out to Salt Lake City to take on the Royals for the second leg on November 6. Although Dallas had a 2–1 aggregate lead, they were playing in Rio Tinto Stadium, considered by many to be one of the most intimidating soccer atmospheres in the United States, where Salt Lake hadn't lost a match since May 2009. The match drew a near-capacity crowd of roughly 19,500 spectators. In the 17th minute of the match, a goal from Dallas midfielder and American international Dax McCarty gave the Toros a 3–1 lead on aggregate and a 1–0 lead for the match. For a majority of the match, deep into the second half, Dallas held this lead. A late equalizer from Robbie Findley leveled the game at 1–1, but it was too little, too late for RSL as the Dallas eliminated the defending champions, 3–1 on aggregate.

November 6's victory over Salt Lake propelled Dallas into the Western Conference finals against the MLS Cup runners-up from last year, Los Angeles Galaxy. Heralding international superstars such as David Beckham and Landon Donovan, the Galaxy were coming off a run in the regular season, capturing the MLS Supporters' Shield with a 17–7–8 record. The Galaxy had defeated Seattle Sounders FC in their quarterfinal series to qualify for the championship. Since the Galaxy were the top seed in the Western Conference bracket, while Dallas was the third, Los Angeles hosted the final.

In front of a sold-out capacity crowd of 27,000 at the Galaxy's home ground The Home Depot Center, Dallas dismantled the Galaxy with goals from David Ferreira, George John and Marvin Chávez. The 3–0 victory for Dallas avenged their 2–0 loss at the Home Depot Center, and they handed the Galaxy their worst loss at home since a 4–1 defeat to the Puerto Rico Islanders in a Champions League play-in proper. The victory gave Dallas a spot in their first ever MLS Cup final.

The MLS Cup final was held on Sunday, November 21, 2010, in Toronto, Canada. The match between the Colorado Rapids and the FC Dallas Bulls kicked off at 8:30 pm EST. The final began slowly with the first goal not coming until the 35th minute. A strike from FC Dallas midfielder David Ferriera gave the Bulls a 1–0 advantage. The equalizer came from Colorado Rapids forward Conor Casey in the 56th minute. The game-winning goal came by way of a deflected shot from Colorado Rapids forward Macoumba Kandji. Kandji's shot deflected off the leg of FC Dallas defender George John and trickled into the net past keeper, Kevin Hartman. Rapids head coach Gary Smith commented following the victory, "Honestly, I don't mind how they come. If they're winners, it doesn't matter. The overriding thought is they must be under some pressure to make that mistake."

== Transfers ==
=== In ===
Date	Player	Previous club	Fee	Ref
January 14, 2010	(United States) Zach Loyd	Unattached	Drafted	
January 14, 2010	(United States) Andrew Wiedeman	(United States) NorCal Lamorinda United	Drafted	
January 14, 2010	(United States) Jason Yeisley	(United States) Reading Rage	Drafted	
March 8, 2010	(United States) Kevin Hartman	(United States) Kansas City	Trade	
May 13, 2010	(Colombia) Milton Rodríguez	(Colombia) Real Cartagena	Undisclosed	

=== Out ===
Date	Player	Destination Club	Fee	Ref
November 16, 2009	(Costa Rica) Daniel Torres		Released	
February 2, 2010	(United States) Blake Wagner	(Canada) Vancouver Whitecaps	Free	
March 1, 2010	(Argentina) Pablo Ricchetti	(United States) Westham Azzurri	Free	
March 5, 2010	(Netherlands) Dave van den Bergh		Released	
April 2, 2010	(United States) Steve Purdy	(United States) Portland Timbers	Free	
July 30, 2010	(United States) Anthony Wallace	(United States) Colorado Rapids	Trade	
August 31, 2010	(Brazil) André Rocha	(Greece) Panetolikos	Released	

=== Loan ===
==== In ====
Player	From	Start	End	Ref
(Costa Rica) Álvaro Sánchez	(Costa Rica) San Carlos	August 1, 2009	March 15, 2010	
(Honduras) Marvin Chávez	(Honduras) Marathón	August 18, 2009	November 30, 2010	
(Brazil) Jackson	(Brazil) São Paulo	August 13, 2010	December 31, 2010	

== Major League Soccer ==
=== Standings ===
Conference

Pos	Team	Pld	W	L	T	GF	GA	GD	Pts	Qualification
1	LA Galaxy	30	18	7	5	44	26	+18	59	Qualification for the conference semifinals
2	Real Salt Lake	30	15	4	11	45	20	+25	56	Qualification for the conference semifinals
3	FC Dallas	30	12	4	14	42	28	+14	50	Qualification for the conference semifinals
4	Seattle Sounders FC	30	14	10	6	39	35	+4	48	Qualification for the conference semifinals
5	Colorado Rapids	30	12	8	10	44	32	+12	46	Qualification for the conference semifinals
6	San Jose Earthquakes	30	13	10	7	34	33	+1	46	Qualification for the conference semifinals
7	Houston Dynamo	30	9	15	6	40	49	−9	33	
8	Chivas USA	30	8	18	4	31	45	−14	28	

Source: MLS

Overall

Pos	Team	Pld	W	L	T	GF	GA	GD	Pts	
1	LA Galaxy (S)	30	18	7	5	44	26	+18	59	Qualification for the CONCACAF Champions League
2	Real Salt Lake	30	15	4	11	45	20	+25	56	
3	New York Red Bulls	30	15	9	6	38	29	+9	51	
4	FC Dallas	30	12	4	14	42	28	+14	50	Qualification for the CONCACAF Champions League
5	Columbus Crew	30	14	8	8	40	34	+6	50	
6	Seattle Sounders FC (U)	30	14	10	6	39	35	+4	48	Qualification for the CONCACAF Champions League
7	Colorado Rapids (C)	30	12	8	10	44	32	+12	46	Qualification for the CONCACAF Champions League
8	San Jose Earthquakes	30	13	10	7	34	33	+1	46	
9	Kansas City Wizards	30	11	13	6	36	35	+1	39	
10	Chicago Fire	30	9	12	9	37	38	−1	36	
11	Toronto FC (V)	30	9	13	8	33	41	−8	35	Qualification for the CONCACAF Champions League
12	Houston Dynamo	30	9	15	6	40	49	−9	33	
13	New England Revolution	30	9	16	5	32	50	−18	32	
14	Philadelphia Union	30	8	15	7	35	49	−14	31	
15	Chivas USA	30	8	18	4	31	45	−14	28	
16	D.C. United	30	6	20	4	21	47	−26	22	

Source: MLS
Rules for classification: 1) points; 2) head-to-head record; 3) goal difference; 4) number of goals scored
(C) MLS Cup champions; (S) Supporters' Shield winners; (U) U.S. Open Cup winners; (V) Canadian Championship winners

=== Results summary ===
Overall								Home						Away					
Pld	Pts	W	L	T	GF	GA	GD	W	L	T	GF	GA	GD	W	L	T	GF	GA	GD
30	50	12	4	14	42	28	+14	8	1	6	25	13	+12	4	3	8	17	15	+2

Last updated: March 30, 2011
Source: Major League Soccer
Pld = Matches played; Pts = Points; W = Matches won; T = Matches tied; L = Matches lost; GF = Goals for; GA = Goals against; GD = Goal difference

Round	1	2	3	4	5	6	7	8	9	10	11	12	13	14	15	16	17	18	19	20	21	22	23	24	25	26	27	28	29	30
Stadium	H	H	A	H	A	A	H	A	H	A	H	A	H	A	H	A	A	H	A	H	A	H	A	H	H	A	H	H	A	A
Result	T	T	L	T	T	W	W	T	L	T	W	W	W	T	W	T	T	W	W	W	T	W	T	T	T	W	W	T	L	L
Position	8	12	14	12	14	11	7	8	10	10	9	6	6	6	5	4	4	4	4	4	4	4	4	4	4	3	3	3	3	4

Updated to match(es) played on October 30, 2010. Source: MLS Results and League table
A = Away; H = Home; W = Win; L = Loss; T = Tie

=== Match results ===
==== Regular season ====
Win Tie Loss

March 27, 2010 1 Texas Derby	Houston Dynamo	1–1	FC Dallas	Frisco, Texas
	Chabala 36'; Boswell (yellow card) 57'		McCarty (yellow card) 32'; Harris 38'; Harris (yellow card) 45'	Stadium: Pizza Hut Park; Attendance: 8,016; Referee: Alex Prus

April 10, 2010 2 Pioneer Cup	Columbus Crew	2–2	FC Dallas	Frisco, Texas
	Moffat 52'; Carroll (yellow card) 55'; Schelotto 82' (pen.); O'Rourke (red card) 98+'	(report)	Cunningham 29' (pen.); Pearce (yellow card) 61'; Avila 98+'	Stadium: Pizza Hut Park; Attendance: 8,422; Referee: Jason Anno

April 17, 2010 3	FC Dallas	1–2	New York Red Bulls	Harrison, New Jersey
19:30 EDT	10' McCarty; (yellow card) 24' Harris	(Report)	Ángel 56' 90' (pen.)	Stadium: Red Bull Arena; Attendance: 13,667; Referee: Alex Prus

April 22, 2010 4	Seattle Sounders FC	2–2	FC Dallas	Frisco, Texas
17:00 PDT	Marshall (yellow card) 21'; Zakuani 37'; Montero (yellow card) 44' (goal) 55'	Report	John (yellow card) 7'; Cunningham 27' (pen.); Cunningham 94+' (pen.)	Stadium: Pizza Hut Park; Attendance: 8,512; Referee: Terry Vaughn

May 1, 2010 5	FC Dallas	1–1	New England Revolution	Foxborough, Massachusetts
19:30 EDT	Benitez (yellow card) 25'; John (yellow card) 42'; Sala (yellow card) 42'; McCarty (yellow card) 62'; Harris 66' (yellow card) 78'	(report)	Sinovic (yellow card) 14'; Schilawski 41'; Dube (red card) 56'; Niouky (yellow card) 65' (red card) 72'; Nyassi (yellow card) 77'; Perovic (yellow card) 92+'; Burpo (yellow card) 95+'	Stadium: Gillette Stadium; Attendance: 10,057; Referee: Jeff Gontarek

May 5, 2010 6 Texas Derby	FC Dallas	1–0	Houston Dynamo	Houston, Texas
21:00 EDT	Hernández (yellow card) 45'; Benítez (red card) 73'; Ihemelu 78'	Report	Hainault (yellow card) 50'	Stadium: Robertson Stadium; Attendance: 13,231; Referee: Jorge González

May 8, 2010 7	D.C. United	0–1	FC Dallas	Frisco, Texas
	Morsink (yellow card) 43'	Report	Hernández (yellow card) 39'; Cunningham 68'; Ihemelu (yellow card) 75'	Stadium: Pizza Hut Park; Attendance: 10,323; Referee: Landis Wiley

May 15, 2010 8	FC Dallas	1–1	Philadelphia Union	Philadelphia, Pennsylvania
	Shea 13'; Pearce (yellow card) 83'	Report	Torres (yellow card) 62'; Mwanga 93'	Stadium: Lincoln Financial Field; Attendance: 25,038; Referee: Ricardo Salazar

May 20, 2010 9	Los Angeles Galaxy	1–0	FC Dallas	Frisco, Texas
	Magee 17'; Magee (yellow card) 31'; Stephens (yellow card) 35'	Report	Ihemelu (yellow card) 28'; Shea (yellow card) 48'	Stadium: Pizza Hut Park; Attendance: 10,947; Referee: Abiodun Okulaja

May 27, 2010 10 Brimstone Cup	FC Dallas	1–1	Chicago Fire	Bridgeview, Illinois
	Ferreira 6'; Harris (yellow card) 84'	Report	McBride 40'; Conde (yellow card) 62'	Stadium: Toyota Park; Attendance: 12,522; Referee: Baldomero Toledo

June 5, 2010 11	San Jose Earthquakes	0–2	FC Dallas	Frisco, Texas
	Hernandez (yellow card) 70'	Report	Shea 58', 60'; John (yellow card) 68'	Stadium: Pizza Hut Park; Attendance: 14,331; Referee: Jasen Anno

June 26, 2010 12	FC Dallas	2–1	Chivas USA	Carson, California
	Jazic 45' (o.g.); Ferreira 61'; Guarda (yellow card) 71'	Report	Lahoud (yellow card) 1'; Romero 59'	Stadium: Home Depot Center; Attendance: 14,173; Referee: Abbey Okulaja

July 3, 2010 13	Kansas City Wizards	0–1	FC Dallas	Frisco, Texas
	Rocastle (yellow card) 60'; Espinoza (yellow card) 63'	Report	Ferreira 58'	Stadium: Pizza Hut Park; Attendance: 15,993; Referee: Ramón Hernández

July 11, 2010 14	FC Dallas	1–1	Seattle Sounders FC	Seattle
	Ferreira (yellow card) 34' (goal) 87'; Hernández (yellow card) 49'; Shea (yellow card) 56'; McCarty (yellow card) 76'; Pearce (yellow card) 84'		Montero 17'; González (yellow card) 50'; Montaño (red card) 56'	Stadium: Qwest Field; Attendance: 36,091; Referee: Kevin Stott

July 17, 2010 15	Real Salt Lake	0–2	FC Dallas	Frisco, Texas
	Johnson (yellow card) 42'		Ihemulu (yellow card) 40'; Ferreira (yellow card) 68'; Shea 69'; Harris 77'	Stadium: Pizza Hut Park; Attendance: 11,170

July 24, 2010 16	FC Dallas	1–1	Toronto FC	Toronto, Ontario, Canada
	Hernández (yellow card) 21'; Rodríguez 77'; Benítez (yellow card) 96+'	(report)	De Rosario (yellow card) 17'; Sanyang (yellow card) 23'; Cann (yellow card) 39'; Santos 61'	Stadium: BMO Field; Attendance: 19,743; Referee: Edvin Jurisevic

July 31, 2010 17	FC Dallas	1–1	Colorado Rapids	Commerce City, Colorado
	Baudet 22' (o.g.); Chávez (yellow card) 77'		Ballouchy 26'	Stadium: Dick's Sporting Goods Park; Attendance: 10,596; Referee: Alex Prus

August 8, 2010 18	Philadelphia Union	1–3	FC Dallas	Frisco, Texas
	Moreno 9'; Knighton (red card) 22'		Ferreira 24'; Cunningham 75' 81'	Stadium: Pizza Hut Park; Attendance: 8,732; Referee: Jair Marrufo

August 14, 2010 19	FC Dallas	3–1	D.C. United	Washington, D.C.
	Rodríguez (yellow card) 23'; Ferreira 24'; Alexander 49'; Cunningham 90+2'		Burch (yellow card) 69'; Benitez 80' (o.g.)	Stadium: RFK Stadium; Attendance: 12474; Referee: Abiodun Okulaja

August 21, 2010 20	Chivas USA	0–1	FC Dallas	Frisco, Texas
	Padilla (yellow card) 79'; Nagamura (yellow card) 89'		Harris (yellow card) 34'; Shea 71'; Hernández (yellow card) 79'	Stadium: Pizza Hut Park; Attendance: 10,309; Referee: Paul Ward

August 28, 2010 21 Pioneer Cup	FC Dallas	0–0	Columbus Crew	Columbus, Ohio
4:00 pm ET	Loyd (yellow card) 40'; Hernández (yellow card) 77'; Harris (yellow card) 85'	Report	Moffat (yellow card) 28'; Barros Schelotto (yellow card) 77'	Stadium: Columbus Crew Stadium; Referee: Andrew Chapin

September 4, 2010 22	Toronto FC	0–1	FC Dallas	Frisco, Texas
7:30 pm CT	LaBrocca (yellow card) 46+'; Šarić (yellow card) 15' (yellow-red card) 89'	Report	Cunningham 47'; Benítez (yellow card) 90+1'	Stadium: Pizza Hut Park; Attendance: 10,033; Referee: Alex Prus

September 11, 2010 23	FC Dallas	0–0	San Jose Earthquakes	Santa Clara, California
	Alexander (yellow card) 42'		Eduardo (yellow card) 88'	Stadium: Buck Shaw Stadium; Attendance: 10,341; Referee: Ricardo Salazar

September 16, 2010 24	New York Red Bulls	2–2	FC Dallas	Frisco, Texas
	Miller (yellow card) 41'; Ballouchy 48+'; Henry (yellow card) 48'; Benitez 82' (o.g.); Ballouchy (yellow card) 90+4'		Rodriguez 42'; Shea (yellow card) 29'; Alexander 68'; Chávez (yellow card) 86'	Stadium: Pizza Hut Park; Attendance: 15,105; Referee: Hilario Grajeda

September 22, 2010 25	New England Revolution	2–2	FC Dallas	Frisco, Texas
8:30 pm EDT	Joseph 5'; Gibbs (yellow card) 17'; Barnes (yellow card) 33'; Stolica 61'; Phelan (yellow card) 90'	Report	Ferreira 80' (pen.); Cunningham 90'	Stadium: Pizza Hut Park; Attendance: 7,468; Referee: Baldomero Toledo

September 25, 2010 26	FC Dallas	3–1	Kansas City Wizards	Kansas City, Kansas
7:30 pm CDT	Chávez 4'; Rodríguez 12'; Pearce (yellow card) 37'; McCarty (yellow card) 74'; Cunningham 81'; Harris (yellow card) 85'; Ferreira (yellow card) 86'	Report	Harrington (yellow card) 32'; Smith 56'; Jewsbury (yellow card) 76'	Stadium: CommunityAmerica Ballpark; Attendance: 10,385; Referee: Silviu Petrescu

October 2, 2010 27 Brimstone Cup	Chicago Fire	0–3	FC Dallas	Frisco, Texas
7:30 pm CDT	Pause (yellow card) 28'; Conde (yellow card) 84'	Report	Rodriguez 19'; Chávez (yellow card) 30' (goal) 46'; Cunningham 67' (pen.)	Stadium: Pizza Hut Park; Attendance: 10,615; Referee: Alex Prus

October 9, 2010 28	Colorado Rapids	2–2	FC Dallas	Frisco, Texas
7:00 pm CDT	Larentowicz 13', 51'	Report	Rodriguez 27'; Ferreira 37'	Stadium: Pizza Hut Park; Attendance: 10,119; Referee: Paul Ward

October 16, 2010 29	FC Dallas	0–2	Real Salt Lake	Sandy, Utah
	Pearce (yellow card) 88'		Grabavoy 59'; Espindola (yellow card) 75'; Williams (yellow card) 80'; Morales 89'	Stadium: Rio Tinto Stadium; Attendance: 20,236; Referee: Baldomero Toledo

October 24, 2010 30	FC Dallas	1–2	Los Angeles Galaxy	Carson, California
	24' (yellow card) 45' Harris		Beckham 33'; Juninho 46'; Donovan (yellow card) 58'	Stadium: Home Depot Center; Referee: Mark Geiger

==== Playoffs ====
FC Dallas qualified for the 2010 MLS Cup playoffs following a 2–1 victory at New England on October 2. Amid the controversy surrounding the playoff structure, Dallas was seeded as the number three team in the Western Conference bracket, drawn against the second-place West club and MLS Cup defending champions, Real Salt Lake. The draw took place at Major League Soccer's headquarters in New York City on October 24.

The Conference Semifinals served as a two-leg, home and away aggregate series with no away goals rule enforced. Dallas hosted Salt Lake on October 30. Despite an early goal from Fabian Espindola in the fifth-minute, Dallas would rally with a pair of goals from Jeff Cunningham and Eric Avila, giving not only them victory, but a lead in the a series.

RSL and Dallas played at Rio Tinto Stadium in Sandy on November 6 for the second leg. A 17th-minute goal from Dax McCarty gave Dallas a 3–1 advantage in the series, and not only jeopardized Salt Lake's chance for going on the Western Conference Championship, but the chance that Salt Lake would end their home-match unbeaten streak. A goal from Robbie Findley ensured the streak would stay alive, but the tie secured Dallas a spot in the Western Conference Championship, as Dallas would advance 3–2 on aggregate.

Dallas played in Los Angeles against the Galaxy for the Western Conference Championship. Dallas shutout LA 3–0, becoming the final original MLS club to make it to the MLS Cup.

Dallas took an early lead over the Colorado Rapids in the MLS Cup, but the Rapids came back to score a goal in the second half and forced overtime. Early into overtime, a cross deflected off of Dallas defender George John and into Dallas' net. Despite several late chances for Dallas, the Rapids held on, win the MLS Cup 2–1 off the overtime own goal.

October 30, 2010 Conf. Semifinals	Real Salt Lake	1–2	FC Dallas	Frisco, Texas
3:00 pm MDT	Espindola 5'; Williams (yellow card) 46'; Morales (yellow card) 49' (red card)	Report	Benitez (yellow card) 25'; Cunningham 44'; Hernández (yellow card) 49'; Harris (red card); Avila 88'	Stadium: Pizza Hut Park; Attendance: 11,003; Referee: (New Jersey) Kevin Stott

November 6, 2010 Conf. Semifinals	FC Dallas	1–1 (3–2 agg.)	Real Salt Lake	Sandy, Utah
8:00 pm MDT	McCarty 17'; Chávez (yellow card) 27'; Loyd (yellow card) 84'	Report	Olave (yellow card) 25'; Grabavoy (yellow card) 29'; Borchers (yellow card) 34'; Findley 79'	Stadium: Rio Tinto Stadium; Attendance: 19,234; Referee: (California) Jorge Gonzalez

November 14, 2010 Conf. Final	FC Dallas	3–0	Los Angeles Galaxy	Carson, California
8:00 pm CDT	Ferreira 26'; John 54'; Chávez 73'; Loyd (yellow card) 85'	Report	Kovalenko (yellow card) 37'; Beckham (yellow card) 73'; Birchall (yellow card) 82' dos Santos (yellow card) 84'	Stadium: Home Depot Center; Attendance: 27,000; Referee: Jair Maruffo

November 21, 2010 MLS Cup	FC Dallas	1–2 (OT)	Colorado Rapids	Toronto, Ontario, Canada
5:30 pm CDT	Ferreira 35'; Benitez (yellow card) 84'		(yellow card) 41' Wallace; (yellow card) 51' Smith; 57' (yellow card) 84' Casey; 106' (o.g.) John	Stadium: BMO Field; Attendance: 21,700; Referee: Baldomero Toledo

== U.S. Open Cup ==
With an 11th-place finish in Major League Soccer last season, Dallas did not automatically qualify for the 2010 edition of the U.S. Open Cup. Instead, they would have to qualify in a series of matches against unqualified MLS clubs to enter the tournament. They were paired against last year's 10th-place finisher, D.C. United; where they played the United at RFK Stadium on April 28.

Goals from Bruno Guarda and Dax McCarty would not be enough as Dallas would fall 4–2 to the United to end their short USOC campaign.

April 28, 2010 Game E	(Texas) FC Dallas	2–4	D.C. United (Washington, D.C.)	Washington, D.C.
7:30 pm EDT	52' Guarda; 57' (pen.) McCarty; (yellow card) 67' Wallace; (yellow card) 72' Edward	Report	Cristman 4', 59'; Morsink (yellow card) 21'; Wallace (yellow card) 28'; Castillo 39'; Najar 51'	Stadium: RFK Stadium; Attendance: 2,804; Referee: (Rhode Island) Chris Penso

== Jerseys ==
Home	Away	Away Alternate	Away Alt. 2

Type	Shirt	Shorts	Socks	First appearance / Info
Home	Red / White hoops	Red	Red	
Away	Blue / White hoops	Blue	Blue	
Away Alt.	Blue / White hoops	Blue	White	MLS, May 5 against Houston / MLS Cup 2010
Away Alt. 2	Blue / White hoops	White	White	MLS, June 26 against Chivas USA → 2008 Away Shorts

== Squad ==
As of August 21, 2010. Note: Flags indicate national team as defined under FIFA eligibility rules; some limited exceptions apply. Players may hold more than one non-FIFA nationality.

No.	Pos.	Nation	Player
1	GK	USA	Kevin Hartman
2	DF	USA	Daniel Hernández
3	DF	USA	Ugo Ihemelu
4	DF	USA	Heath Pearce
5	DF	COL	Jair Benítez (on loan from Deportivo Cali)
6	DF	BRA	Jackson (on loan from São Paulo FC)
7	FW	COL	Milton Rodriguez
8	MF	BRA	Bruno Guarda
9	FW	USA	Jeff Cunningham
10	FW	COL	David Ferreira (on loan from At. Paranaense)
12	MF	USA	Eric Avila
13	MF	USA	Dax McCarty
14	MF	USA	George John

No.	Pos.	Nation	Player
15	DF	USA	Kyle Davies
16	FW	SKN	Atiba Harris
17	MF	BIH	Perica Marošević
18	FW	HON	Marvin Chávez (on loan from Marathón)
19	DF	USA	Zach Loyd
20	FW	USA	Brek Shea
21	MF	MEX	Bryan Leyva
22	GK	USA	Josh Lambo
23	FW	USA	Andrew Wiedeman
24	DF	USA	Eric Alexander
26	DF	USA	Anthony Wallace
27	DF	CAN	Edson Edward
31	FW	USA	Jason Yeisley
44	GK	ARG	Darío Sala

=== Formation ===
4–5–1 formation against Real Salt Lake on Nov. 6
