= MLS Cup 2010 =

2010 edition of the MLS Cup

- MLS Cup 2010 logo
- Event: MLS Cup
Colorado Rapids	FC Dallas
2	1
- After extra time
- Date: November 21, 2010
- Venue: BMO Field, Toronto, Ontario, Canada
- MLS Cup MVP: Conor Casey (Colorado Rapids)
- Referee: Baldomero Toledo
- Attendance: 21,700
- Weather: Clear, 6 °C (43 °F)

MLS Cup 2010 was the 15th edition of the MLS Cup, the championship match of Major League Soccer (MLS), the top-flight soccer league in the United States and Canada. The match took place on November 21, 2010, at BMO Field in Toronto, Ontario, the first Canadian city to host the league's championship. It was contested by the Colorado Rapids and FC Dallas, both from the Western Conference, to determine the champion of the 2010 season. The 2010 edition was the fourth MLS Cup to feature finalists from the same conference.

Colorado won 2–1 over Dallas on an own goal in extra time, as a shot by Rapids forward Macoumba Kandji was deflected on goal by Dallas defender George John. The match kicked off at 8:30 pm EST, and was televised by ESPN and Galavisión in the United States, and by TSN2 in Canada.

As a result of their victory, the Colorado Rapids earned direct Group Stage berth in the 2011–12 CONCACAF Champions League. FC Dallas earned a preliminary round spot in the Champions League.

== Road to the final ==
The MLS Cup is the post-season championship of Major League Soccer, a professional club soccer league based in the United States. The 2010 season was the 15th in the league's history and was contested by 16 teams organized into two conferences, each with 8 teams. The regular season ran from March to October with teams playing 30 matches in a double round-robin format with home-and-away series against the other 15 teams. The top eight teams advanced to the MLS Cup Playoffs, a postseason tournament that determined the league's champion.

The 2010 MLS Cup Playoffs format was unchanged from the previous year, with the top two teams from each conference qualifying alongside four wild card slots for the next teams in the overall standings regardless of conference. It took place from October 28 to November 21 and was organized into three rounds: a home-and-away series in the Conference Semifinals, a single-match Conference Final, and the MLS Cup final. The Conference Semifinals was a two-legged series, while the Conference Final was a single match hosted by the highest-seeded team and MLS Cup final was a single match at a predetermined venue.

MLS Cup 2010 was contested by the Colorado Rapids and FC Dallas, both Western Conference teams who qualified for the playoffs as wild cards. It was the first time that the finalists had been lower-ranked seeds in the playoffs and the fourth MLS Cup to be contested by two teams from the same conference. The eight-team playoffs had six teams from the Western Conference due to four wild-card teams earning a better record in the overall standings. As neither team had won an MLS Cup, the winner of the 2010 edition would become the league's ninth club to win a championship. The Colorado Rapids and FC Dallas had met twice during the regular season and drew both matches.

=== Colorado Rapids ===
The Colorado Rapids were one of the ten founding clubs of MLS and debuted in the 1996 season, where they finished last in the overall standings. The team overhauled its roster and won several upsets in the playoffs to reach MLS Cup 1997, where they were defeated by D.C. United. The Rapids consistently qualified for the MLS Cup Playoffs in later seasons and reached the Western Conference Final three times from 2002 to 2006; they failed to qualify for the playoffs from 2007 to 2009. Former Arsenal F.C. academy manager Gary Smith was hired as the head coach of the Rapids on November 11, 2008, after serving as the interim coach for several matches.

The team finished the 2009 season in ninth place with a 10–10–10 record, level on points with the lowest playoff seed but unable to qualify. For the 2010 season, the Rapids returned with most of its key players and also made several offseason trades with the New England Revolution and Toronto FC. In January, the team completed a four-player trade with the Revolution to acquire midfielders Jeff Larentowicz and Wells Thompson in exchange for backup goalkeeper Preston Burpo, defender Cory Gibbs, and a draft pick. The Rapids made three separate trades with Toronto FC, including sending midfielder Nick LaBrocca to acquire defender Marvell Wynne in late March.

The Rapids began the season with a 1–1–1 record as they dropped points to the Chicago Fire and Kansas City Wizards. The team's record improved to 6–3–2 in June and had a four-match unbeaten streak as the league took a three-weak break for the 2010 World Cup. The Rapids returned from the break and entered a seven-match winless streak with five draws that kept them third in the Western Conference standings, ahead of FC Dallas and Seattle Sounders FC. The team won five of their remaining twelve matches to qualify for the playoffs for the first time since 2006. Forwards Conor Casey and Omar Cummings combined for 27 goals during the regular season, the most of any duo in the league.

As the fifth-place team in the Western Conference and seventh overall, the Rapids used a wild card slot for playoff seeding. Alongside sixth-place San Jose Earthquakes, they were moved to the Eastern Conference bracket for the MLS Cup Playoffs. The Rapids faced the Columbus Crew, who finished second in the Eastern Conference but would play without starting goalkeeper William Hesmer after his injury in the final regular season match. The first leg, played in Commerce City, Colorado, was won 1–0 by the Rapids through a 23rd-minute goal from midfielder Pablo Mastroeni against a fatigued Crew team that had played three matches in eight days. The Crew tied the series on aggregate early in the second leg, played at their home stadium, with an Eddie Gaven goal in the 22nd minute. The hosts then took the lead in the 70th minute from Robbie Rogers's goal, which led to Gary Smith switching the Rapids to a 3–5–2 formation to provide attacking support. Casey scored in the 84th minute to tie the series at 2–2 on aggregate; the scoreline was unchanged through extra time and the result was decided by a penalty shootout. The Rapids made all five of their penalties against backup goalkeeper Andy Gruenebaum and advanced to the Eastern Conference Final after Crew midfielder Brian Carroll missed his penalty in the fifth round.

The team hosted the Eastern Conference Final against the San Jose Earthquakes, the eighth-seeded team who had defeated the conference-leading New York Red Bulls in an upset. The Rapids won 1–0 through a cross in the 43rd minute by midfielder Kosuke Kimura—the first Japanese player in MLS history—that went past Cummings and Earthquakes goalkeeper Jon Busch into the goal. The team would play in their first MLS Cup since 1997 and became the first MLS team to win both conference championships.

=== FC Dallas ===
FC Dallas, formerly named the Dallas Burn, entered MLS as one of the ten original clubs in 1996 and consistently made the playoffs in their first years in the league. The club reached the Western Conference Final twice, where they finished as runners-up to the Rapids in 1997 and Los Angeles Galaxy in 1999, but had yet to appear in the MLS Cup final. The franchise was described as "broken" and "largely irrelevant" until the arrival of head coach Schellas Hyndman, who was hired in 2008 after a successful 24-year collegiate coaching career with Southern Methodist University. The team finished seventh in the Western Conference and eleventh overall in 2009 after rebounding from near the bottom of the standings, but fell short of the playoffs for the second consecutive season.

The team made several acquisitions during the 2009 season that led to an improved defense and the highest goal production in MLS by the end of the year. The four starting defenders for FC Dallas left the club and were replaced by younger players, including Ugo Ihemelu and George John; midfield positions were filled by Colombian playmaker David Ferreira, Daniel Hernández on his return from Mexico, and Atiba Harris after he was traded from Chivas USA. Forward Jeff Cunningham, who won the 2009 MLS Golden Boot with 17 goals, returned to lead the team's offense, which had the most goal scored and conceded during the season. Veteran goalkeeper Kevin Hartman was traded from the Kansas City Wizards to compete with Darío Sala for the starting role.

FC Dallas opened the regular season with a 0–1–4 record as they missed scoring chances and relied on penalty kicks and free kicks to prevent shutouts in all five matches. After Sala was replaced by Hartman, the team earned their first win of the season in May against the Houston Dynamo despite an ejection for defender Jair Benítez. After a 1–0 loss to the Galaxy, FC Dallas amassed a 19-match unbeaten streak that set a new league record for the longest run of its kind within a single season. Reigning Golden Boot champion Jeff Cunningham lost his starting role at forward to Milton Rodríguez early in the run, but regained form in September and scored seven goals in nine appearances to tie Jaime Moreno for the all-time MLS goalscoring record at 132 goals. The streak ended with two away losses to MLS Cup 2009 champion Real Salt Lake and runners-up LA Galaxy; FC Dallas finished the season with a 12–4–14 record (tied for the fewest losses in MLS history) and their first playoff berth since 2007. Ferreira, who had 8 goals and 13 assists, won the Most Valuable Player Award, while Hyndman was named the Coach of the Year.

Our midfield has been tremendous this year. We're getting the best out of Daniel Hernández. He's not just the anchor back in the middle third, but he's also the captain of the team as well, a bit of an inspirational player and also my right hand on the field.

— Schellas Hyndman, FC Dallas head coach

The team finished third in the Western Conference standings and fourth overall to qualify for the playoffs as a wild card, but were seeded to remain in the West bracket. They benefitted from the return of captain Daniel Hernandez and defender Ugo Ihemelu from injuries late in the regular season, as well as goalkeeper Kevin Hartman, who was injured in a September match against the New York Red Bulls in an incident involving Thierry Henry. FC Dallas opened the playoffs against second-seeded Real Salt Lake, who hoped to defend their MLS Cup title, with the first leg played at Pizza Hut Park in Frisco, Texas. They conceded a goal to Real Salt Lake in the fifth minute, but equalized before halftime through Cunningham; both teams lost a player to red cards in the second half and played with 10 men each. FC Dallas won the match 2–1 through a goal by substitute midfielder Eric Avila in the 88th minute. Real Salt Lake hosted the second leg at Rio Tinto Stadium, where they had a 32-match unbeaten streak across all competitions. Dax McCarty scored in the 17th minute to give the visitors a lead, which was preserved by a series of saves by Hartman, but Robbie Findley equalized late in the second half to preserve the unbeaten streak with a 1–1 draw. FC Dallas advanced with their 3–2 aggregate lead and eliminated favorites Real Salt Lake.

FC Dallas advanced to the Western Conference Final, which was hosted at The Home Depot Center by Supporters' Shield champion and MLS Cup 2009 runners-up LA Galaxy. The visitors took the lead in the 26th minute, as Ferreira scored from a counterattack after the Galaxy had several shots saved by Hartman. After halftime, defender George John scored on a long cross from Brek Shea after an earlier corner kick was cleared out to double the lead. Another counterattack led by Ferreira resulted in a goal for Marvin Chávez to cap off the 3–0 victory and a clinch of the Western Conference title for FC Dallas. Galaxy head coach Bruce Arena said that the team were "outplayed" and "out-coached", while also crediting Hartman's saves for having "won them the game". FC Dallas became the last of the still-active original MLS clubs to qualify for the MLS Cup.

=== Summary of results ===
Note: In all results below, the score of the finalist is given first (H: home; A: away).

Colorado Rapids				Round	FC Dallas			
5th place in Western Conference (Seeded into Eastern Conference bracket): Pos / Team / Pld / Pts; 3 / FC Dallas / 30 / 50; 4 / Seattle Sounders FC / 30 / 48; 5 / Colorado Rapids / 30 / 46; 6 / San Jose Earthquakes / 30 / 46; 7 / Houston Dynamo / 30 / 33; Source: MLS Qualified for playoffs				Regular season	3rd place in Western Conference: Pos / Team / Pld / Pts; 1 / LA Galaxy / 30 / 59; 2 / Real Salt Lake / 30 / 56; 3 / FC Dallas / 30 / 50; 4 / Seattle Sounders FC / 30 / 48; 5 / Colorado Rapids / 30 / 46; Source: MLS Qualified for playoffs			
Opponent	Agg.	1st leg	2nd leg	MLS Cup Playoffs	Opponent	Agg.	1st leg	2nd leg
Columbus Crew	2–2	1–0 (H)	2–1 (5–4 p) (A)	Conference Semifinals	Real Salt Lake	3–2	2–1 (H)	1–1 (A)
San Jose Earthquakes	1–0 (H)			Conference Final	LA Galaxy	3–0 (A)		

== Pre-match ==
=== Venue selection ===
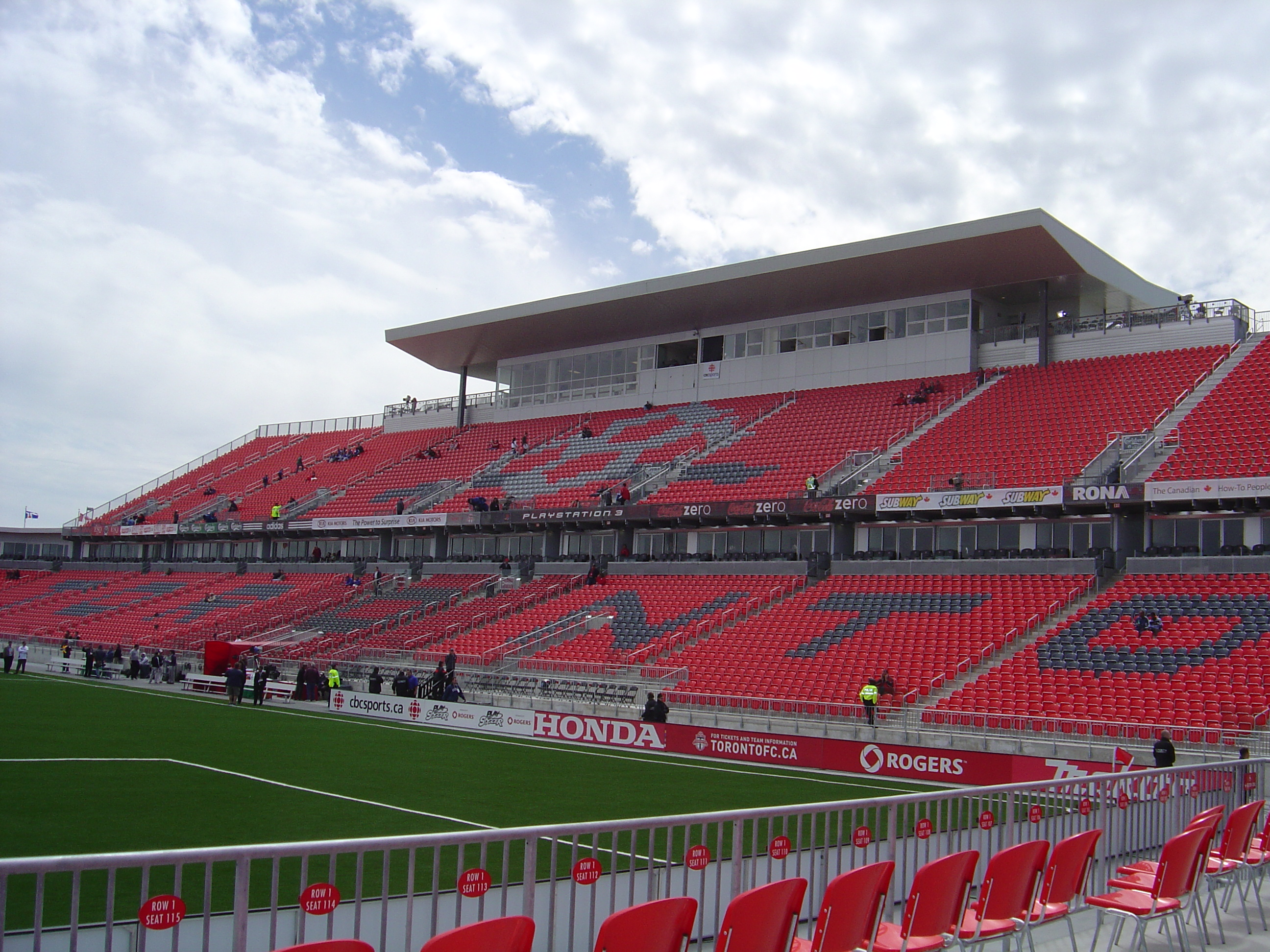
BMO Field, the home stadium of Toronto FC, was chosen by the league as the host of MLS Cup 2010

On March 31, 2010, MLS officials announced that BMO Field in Toronto, the home of Toronto FC, would host MLS Cup 2010. It would be the first MLS championship played in Canada and return to the match to a soccer-specific stadium, as MLS Cup 2009 was played at Qwest Field in Seattle, which is shared with a National Football League team. BMO Field opened in 2007 for expansion team Toronto FC and underwent C$5.5 million in offseason renovations to switch its surface from artificial turf to Kentucky bluegrass, install a heating and irrigation system, and add a grandstand.

The venue had a seating capacity of 21,800 at the time and previously hosted the 2008 MLS All-Star Game; due to its location on Lake Ontario and the November 21 date and evening kickoff for the MLS Cup, it was expected to be a cold-weather game with the possibility of inclement weather. To promote the match, the CN Tower was lit in red and gray to match the MLS Cup logo and Toronto FC's colors after a ceremonial penalty kick was taken by defenders Marvell Wynne for Colorado and Ugo Ihemelu for Dallas; after the end of the final, the CN Tower was lit in the colors of the winning side. Tickets for the MLS Cup final were automatically included in the renewed season ticket packages for the 2011 Toronto FC season. Fans considered a boycott of the match to protest issues with the team's ownership and on-field performance, but ultimately attended.

MLS received three bids for the right to host the match from BMO Field in Toronto, The Home Depot Center in the Los Angeles area, and Red Bull Arena near New York City. The league reviewed the existing neutral-site system for selecting hosts and whether the MLS Cup could be hosted by the highest-seeded finalist, but elected to retain the existing format through 2010. After MLS Cup 2010, league commissioner Don Garber stated that the league would once again consider changes to the host selection process for the championship.

=== Broadcasting ===
The match was televised live in the United States on ESPN, making it the second consecutive year in league history the station carried the match live. The broadcast was available in 1080p high definition. Play-by-play announcer Ian Darke and color commentator John Harkes were in the booth. Darke was commentating his first MLS Cup final, making him the first British-speaker to commentate an MLS Cup match. The pre-game show was hosted by Max Bretos with Alexi Lalas and Steve McManaman. The pregame show was a record-tying one hour before the match itself. The same crew did the post-game show, which was 30 minutes following the match.

Prior to the start of the actual match, ESPN suffered severe criticism from fans and the media for their irregular information regarding the championship. At one point, ESPN posted on their website the wrong venue for the championship match, and failed to mention that the game itself was being carried on one of their channels.

With an average U.S. audience of 1.1 million viewers, the broadcast earned a Nielsen rating of 0.4, it was the lowest-rated MLS Cup broadcast in league history. This marked the ninth consecutive year in MLS Cup history that the league championship has failed to draw at least 1% of U.S. households watching television. Many believed the reason was because the two sides playing in the cup final were among the least-supported clubs in the league. The 0.4 television rating was a 44% percent decline from 2009, in which there was a 0.9 rating nationwide.

The telecast's individual ratings in the Denver and Dallas–Fort Worth metropolitan areas were not disclosed. Other reasons the ratings were very poor was the fact it was played primetime on a Sunday evening, when the American Music Awards was live on ABC; although the AMA's drew weaker network ratings than last year's MLS Cup final. Additionally, NBC's Sunday Night Football NFL matchup between the Philadelphia Eagles and New York Giants was given blame for drawing viewers away from MLS.

The match was broadcast on TSN2 in Canada. It is undisclosed what the ratings were for Canadian audiences and the Toronto area. The match was also broadcast in 116 countries by ESPN International networks, including ESPN Atlantic, ESPN Mexico, ESPN Latin America, and ESPN America.

=== Analysis ===
The match was foreseen by many as an unexpected pairing in the championship match, although some criticized Colorado and Dallas' trip to the final to be a massive fluke, namely due to the seeding MLS used for the playoffs. The match, by some, was deemed a "David vs. David" match with no clear winner.

Others however, saw FC Dallas as the favorites for the match, as they had finished the regular season with only four losses, and knocked off the Supporters Shield winners, Los Angeles Galaxy, in stunning fashion. Some analysts as early as August predicted Dallas to win the entire MLS Cup final.

Off the pitch, the final contained two league franchises that have historically drawn weaker crowds than their league counterparts. Many, including league commissioner Don Garber, believed that the fact the two clubs made it to the final would draw interest from both Denver and Dallas media outlets.

== Match ==
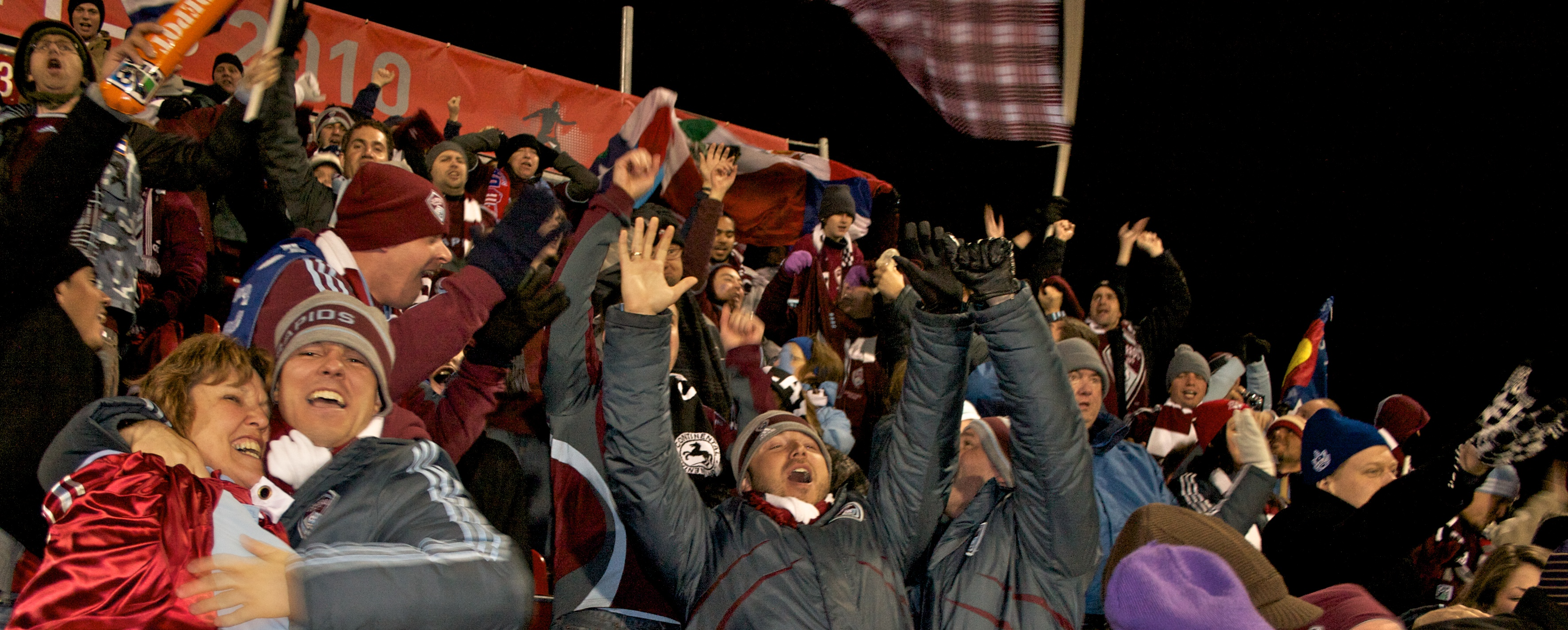
Colorado Rapids fans celebrate a goal scored by the team in the final.

=== First half ===
The 2010 MLS Cup championship kicked off at 9:00 pm Eastern Time, following a thirty-minute pre-match show on ESPN. FC Dallas had the kickoff, and immediately created the first scoring opportunity less than 30 seconds into the game. Nineteen seconds in, Dallas striker and Kittian international Atiba Harris struck a low strike from the upper corner of the penalty box that skimmed wide of the crossbar. The shot was barely deflected by Colorado Rapids' goalkeeper, Matt Pickens. Should have Harris' scored, it would have been the fastest goal scored in MLS Cup history.

It would not be until the sixth minute of play that the Colorado Rapids had their first opportunity on goal. Rapids midfielder, Kosuke Kimura made a long range effort to be saved by Dallas goalie, Kevin Hartman. Hartman's clearance was quickly intercepted by the Rapids central midfielder, Jeff Larentowicz who immediately distributed the ball to teammate, Drew Moor. Moor's shot ended up being off frame of the goal, leading to a goal kick for Dallas.

Following the early wave of attack from Dallas, the Rapids leaned to a more defensive, conservative style of play. The Rapids were able to capitalize on numerous fouls that they caused Dallas to inflict on them. For the following three minutes, Dallas caused four fouls on Colorado, including a Brek Shea fouling Omar Cummings in the ninth of play, which led to a dangerous set piece for Colorado.

Dallas continued to prounce of goalscoring opportunities for a majority of the first half, only to see a majority of their shots either go wide or saved.

In the 35th minute of play, FC Dallas defender George John ran down the right flank of the pitch, and made a long cross into the penalty box. The cross was successfully met with Dallas striker David Ferreira. Ferreira, who had previously been announced the league's Most Valuable Player, buried the ball in the back of the next, opening the score sheet and giving Dallas a 1–0 lead over Colorado.

Going into halftime, Dallas held a 1–0 lead over Colorado.

=== Second half ===
In the 57th minute, Conor Casey received a low cross from Jamie Smith. As he collected the ball in the penalty box, Casey collided with FC Dallas goalkeeper, Kevin Hartman. In the chaos surrounding the clash of players, the ball was loose near Casey's right foot, and while sitting down, kicked the ball into the net, leveling Colorado with Dallas.

For the remainder of the match, most of the possession was dominated by Dallas, who consistently failed to find the back of the net, and even hit the post in the 86th minute. Frantic play from Colorado at the end almost cost them the game, but a shot inches wide led to extra time.

=== Extra time ===
With the Rapids and FC Dallas tied at one apiece at the end of regulation, the match went into extra time, consisting of two fifteen-minute periods, culminated by penalty kicks if needed. It was the second-consecutive year the cup final went into extra time, and the fourth time in the past five years that an MLS Cup final went into extra time.

For most of the first period, only Dallas was able to make any threatening scoring opportunities on Colorado, even though the Rapids were able to create a handful of counterattacks. Many of their shots failed to be threatening.

In the second period of extra time, in the 107th minute, Senegalese-striker Macoumba Kandji of Colorado slowly dribbled the ball into the goal box and attempted to chip the ball into the goal. Dallas defender George John attempted to deflect the cross, but it inadvertently struck the wrong side of his thigh, barreling into the net, for an own goal, the first ever in MLS Cup history. Kandji ended up tearing his ACL on the tackle after his shot. The goal gave Colorado the victory, and their first MLS Cup title in club history.

=== Details ===
November 21, 2010
8:30 pm EST

Colorado Rapids	2–1 (a.e.t.)	FC Dallas
Casey 57'; John 107' (o.g.)	Report (Archived)	Ferreira 35'

BMO Field, Toronto, Ontario
Attendance: 21,700
Referee: Baldomero Toledo

Colorado Rapids	FC Dallas

Colorado Rapids
GK	18	(United States) Matt Pickens
DF	3	(United States) Drew Moor
DF	22	(United States) Marvell Wynne
DF	27	(Japan) Kosuke Kimura
DF	6	(United States) Anthony Wallace	(yellow card) 41'	(substituted off) 90+2'
MF	20	(Scotland) Jamie Smith	(yellow card) 51'	(substituted off) 90'
MF	11	(United States) Brian Mullan
MF	25	(United States) Pablo Mastroeni (c)
MF	4	(United States) Jeff Larentowicz
FW	14	(Jamaica) Omar Cummings		(substituted off) 98'
FW	9	(United States) Conor Casey	(yellow card) 84'
Substitutes:
MF	15	(United States) Wells Thompson		(substituted on) 90'
DF	21	(France) Julien Baudet		(substituted on) 90+2'
FW	10	(Senegal) Macoumba Kandji		(substituted on) 98'
Manager:
(England) Gary Smith

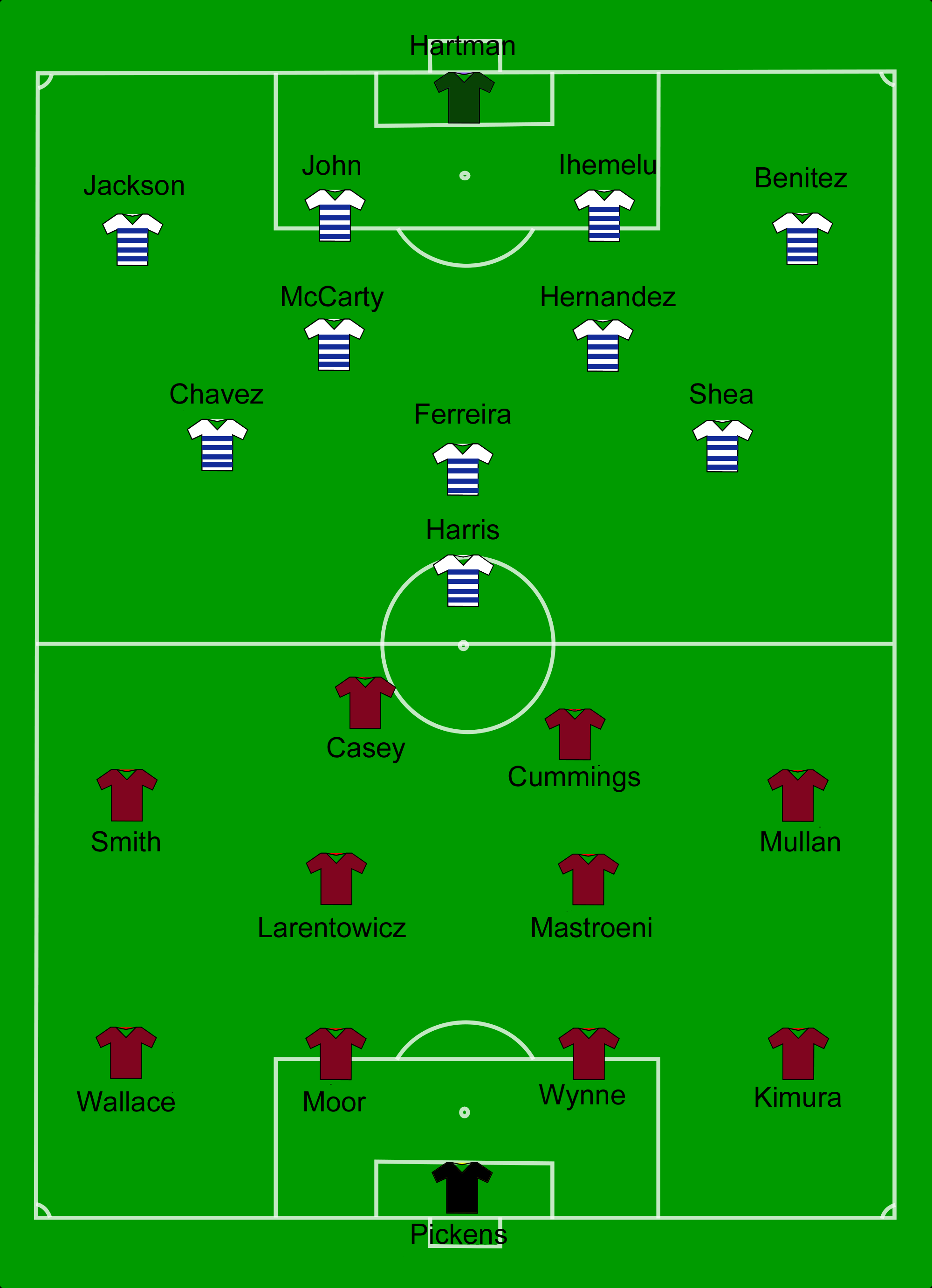

FC Dallas
GK	1	(United States) Kevin Hartman
DF	6	(Brazil) Jackson Gonçalves		(substituted off) 34'
DF	14	(United States) George John
DF	3	(United States) Ugo Ihemelu
DF	5	(Colombia) Jair Benítez	(yellow card) 84'
MF	18	(Honduras) Marvin Chávez		(substituted off) 105'
MF	13	(United States) Dax McCarty
MF	2	(United States) Daniel Hernández (c)
MF	20	(United States) Brek Shea		(substituted off) 64'
FW	10	(Colombia) David Ferreira
FW	16	(Saint Kitts and Nevis) Atiba Harris
Substitutes:
DF	19	(United States) Zach Loyd		(substituted on) 34'
FW	9	(United States) Jeff Cunningham		(substituted on) 64'
MF	12	(United States) Eric Avila		(substituted on) 105'
Manager:
(United States) Schellas Hyndman

Assistant referees:
C.J. Morgante
Craig Lowry
Fourth official:
Silviu Petrescu

=== Statistics ===
Overall

	Dallas	Colorado
Goals scored	2	1
Total shots	7	17
Shots on target	3	6
Saves	5	2
Corner kicks	1	5
Fouls committed	16	11
Offsides	0	4
Yellow cards	3	1
Red cards	0	0

== Post-match ==
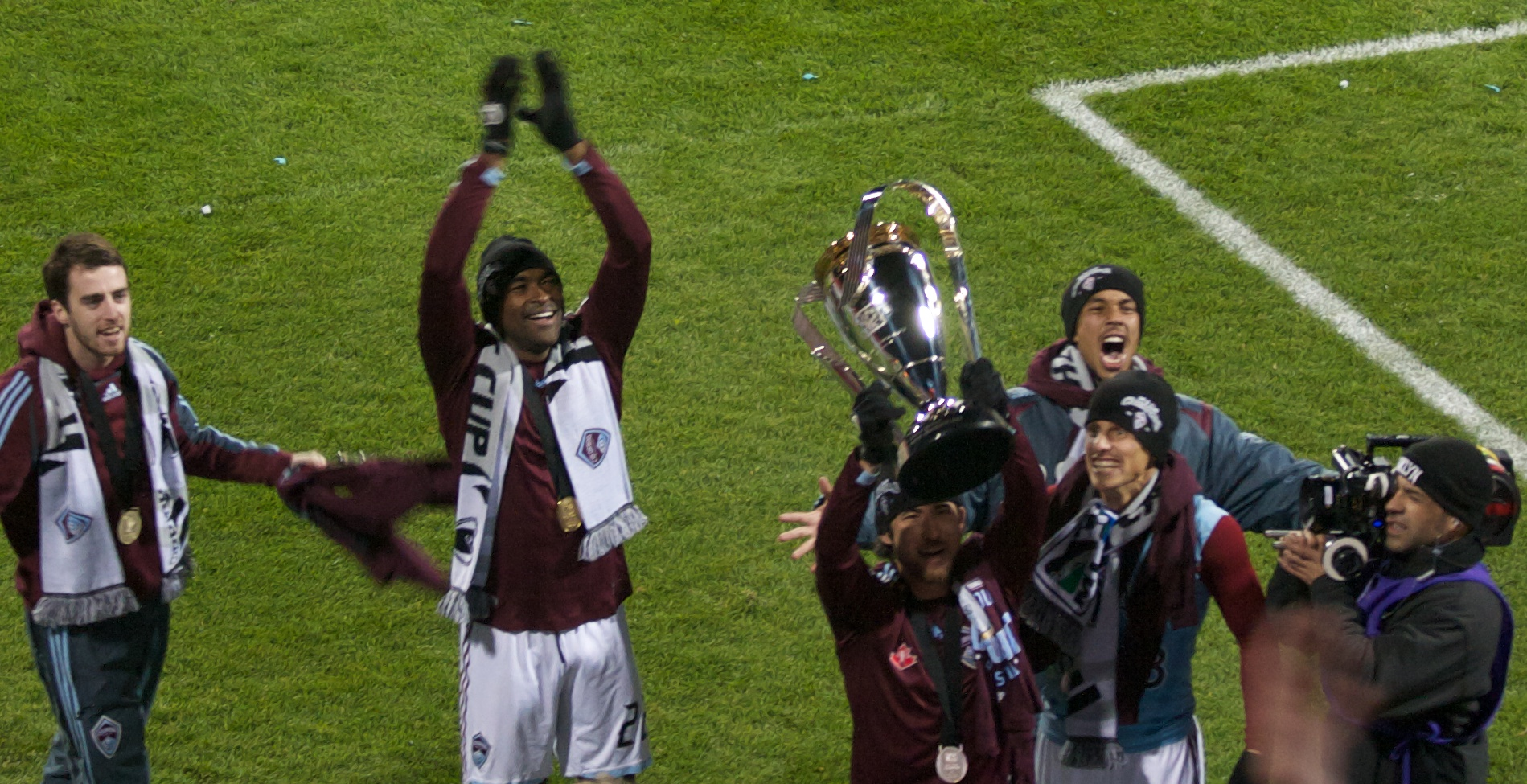
Colorado Rapids players applauding their supporters following the championship.

With the cup title, Colorado Rapids became the first Coloradan club to win any cup or league championship since the Colorado Avalanche won the Stanley Cup in the 2000–01 NHL season. It was also the first time an American soccer club based in Colorado won a cup title since the Colorado Foxes won the APSL championship in 1993. Colorado's head coach, Gary Smith, became the first British coach to win the MLS Cup championship. The team hosted a victory rally in Downtown Denver on November 23, which was proclaimed "Colorado Rapids Day" by Denver mayor John Hickenlooper, and were congratulated by local politicians.

As champions, the Rapids earned a direct berth into group stage of the 2011–12 CONCACAF Champions League, which was to be their second-ever appearance in a CONCACAF competition. FC Dallas also earned their first ever trip to the CONCACAF Champions League by earning a preliminary round spot.

Later on, the result of the Cup and the Playoffs caused MLS to make revisions to its playoff structure, which it had been using since 2006. The new changes to the playoffs, included the top three clubs in each conference a guaranteed playoff spot. This format guarantees at least one club from each conference will play in the conference championship round. This is a likely decision following two clubs, Colorado and San Jose, who competed for the conference title for a division they did not play in.

This MLS Cup also forced the league's hand with regard to neutral-site finals. As MLS in 2010 was not a well-supported league with mass popularity across North America, MLS Cup finals frequently had scattered attendance, with swathes of no-shows on matchday. The next season (2011), MLS Cup was played at the previously-announced home venue of one of the participating teams, which later that year led to the league announcing future MLS Cups would be held at the home venue of the higher-seeded team.

The following season, both clubs returned to the MLS Cup playoffs, but neither reached the championship. In the newly created wildcard round, FC Dallas was eliminated by New York Red Bulls. The Colorado Rapids were eliminated by Sporting Kansas City in the Eastern Conference semifinals.
