= Eric Avila =

American soccer player (born 1987)

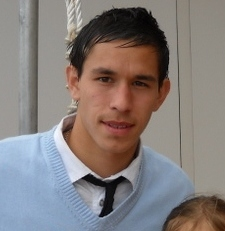

Personal information
- Full name: Eric Humberto Avila
- Date of birth: November 24, 1987 (age 38)
- Place of birth: San Diego, California, U.S.
- Height: 5 ft 8 in (1.73 m)
- Positions: Midfielder; defender

Youth career
- 2005: Chivas USA

College career
Years	Team	Apps	(Gls)
2005–2007	UC Santa Barbara Gauchos	66	(15)

Senior career*
Years	Team	Apps	(Gls)
2006	San Fernando Valley Quakes	3	(0)
2007	Ventura County Fusion	10	(1)
2008–2011	FC Dallas	63	(3)
2011–2012	Toronto FC	33	(2)
2013–2014	Chivas USA	57	(3)
2015	Santos Laguna	0	(0)
2015	→ Orlando City (loan)	21	(1)
2016	Tampa Bay Rowdies	30	(4)
2017	Phoenix Rising	11	(1)
2018	ASC San Diego	7	(1)
2018	Las Vegas Lights	22	(0)
2019	Birmingham Legion	30	(0)
2020	San Diego Loyal	8	(0)
Total		295	(16)

International career
2003–2005	United States U17	20	(0)
2006–2007	United States U20	10	(0)

Managerial career
- 2022–: Birmingham Legion (assistant)
- * Club domestic league appearances and goals

Eric Humberto Avila (born November 24, 1987) is an American assistant soccer coach for USL Championship club Birmingham Legion and a former professional soccer player who has played as a midfielder and defender.

== Early life and education ==
Avila who is of Mexican descent, was born on November 24, 1987, in San Diego, California, to Julio and Maria Avila. Avila was raised in the Carlsbad and Encinitas area and started playing soccer with an American Youth Soccer Organization team. He later played club soccer for the San Diego Crusaders and La Jolla Nomads. With the Nomads, he helped the team to the 2002 US Club Soccer national championship.

He attended La Costa Canyon High School for two years and played for their boys' soccer program. He was named the CIF San Diego Section's Avocado League MVP as a sophomore for the Mavericks. He finished his last two years of high school with the United States U-17 Residency Program in Bradenton, Florida. Upon his return to California, Avila was briefly a member of Chivas USA's U-19 club.

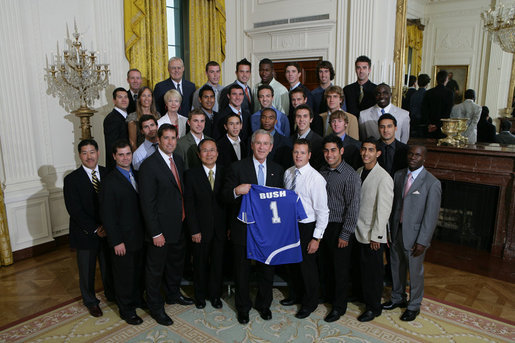
Avila and the 2006 UCSB Gauchos soccer team honored at the White House.

Prior to enrolling in college, Avila was ranked as the 2nd best midfielder and 6th best prospect overall in the class of 2005 by StudentSportsSoccer.com. Avila was recruited with a scholarship to attend the University of California, Santa Barbara by head coach Tim Vom Steeg. Avila was the marquee signing in a class that contained future professionals Chris Pontius, Alfonso Motagalvan, and Ryan Kenny.

As a freshman on the UC Santa Barbara Gauchos men's soccer team in 2005, he started 21 games while scoring three goals and assisting on five more. Avila was named to the College Soccer News All-Freshman First Team as well as being the Big West Conference Freshman of the Year. As a sophomore, Avila started 25 games, scoring eight goals to go along with five assists. He scored the national championship-winning goal in the 2006 NCAA Division I Men's Soccer Championship final over the UCLA Bruins. He was named to the All-College Cup team. As a junior, Avila appeared in 20 games, starting 18 of them. He scored four more goals and added eight assists. He left UCSB to pursue a professional career at the conclusion of the season and finished his Gaucho career with 66 games played, 15 goals, and 18 assists.

During his college years, Avila also played in the USL Premier Development League for the San Fernando Valley Quakes and Ventura County Fusion.

== Playing career ==
=== FC Dallas ===
Avila decided to forgo his senior season as professional clubs started to show interest. Avila decided to sign a Generation Adidas contract and he was subsequently drafted in the 2nd round (19th overall) by FC Dallas in the 2008 MLS SuperDraft.

Avila made his MLS debut for FC Dallas as an 85th-minute substitute against the Houston Dynamo in a 1–1 tie on June 26, 2008. He earned his first MLS career assist on a header by Abe Thompson during stoppage time helping FC Dallas to a 1–1 tie against the Kansas City Wizards on July 4, 2008. and scored his first senior goal on June 20, 2009, in a game against Columbus Crew.

During the 2010 MLS Cup Playoffs, he scored the winning goal in the 88th minute to give Dallas a win over Real Salt Lake in the first leg of the Western Conference semifinals, helping the Red Stripes win the series, 3–2, on aggregate as Dallas made its first-ever MLS Cup appearance.

In December 2008, Avila traveled to England with fellow FC Dallas teammates Bruno Guarda, Josh Lambo, and Anthony Wallace along with other Generation Adidas players for friendlies against the reserve squads of Chelsea, Reading, and Aston Villa. He graduated from the MLS Generation Adidas program at the end of the 2010 season. In July 2011 it was announced that Avila had been transferred on loan to F.C. Atlas for 6 months, but the loan deal fell through.

=== Toronto FC ===
On August 2, 2011, FC Dallas traded Avila to Toronto FC for Maicon Santos and an international roster spot (through the remainder of the 2011 season). Four days later Avila made his debut for the team against D.C. United in a 3–3 away draw. Avila scored his first goal for Toronto on August 27 in a 1–1 home draw against San Jose Earthquakes. Avila scored his first goal of the 2012 season against Real Salt Lake April 28 in a 3–2 away defeat.

=== Chivas USA ===
When Avila's contract expired at the end of the 2012 season he elected to participate in the 2012 MLS Re-Entry Draft. On December 14, 2012, Avila was selected by Colorado Rapids in stage two of the draft. About a month later, Avila was traded to Chivas USA for Nick LaBrocca. Avila went on trial with C.D. Guadalajara of the Liga MX on two occasions but the club never signed him. There was also speculation that Santos Laguna were going to sign him but the negotiations seemed to stop.

=== Orlando City ===
Avila joined Orlando on loan from Santos Laguna. He scored his first goal on May 17, 2015, against LA Galaxy in which Orlando City SC won 4–0. Avila made 21 appearances for Orlando in 2015, totaling 1,325 minutes of play.

=== Tampa Bay Rowdies ===
On February 26, 2016, Avila joined the Tampa Bay Rowdies on a one-year contract with a club option for 2017.

=== Phoenix Rising ===
Avila signed with Phoenix Rising FC on April 28, 2017.

=== ASC San Diego ===
For the 2018 season he was on the roster at NPSL team ASC San Diego.

== Coaching ==
Following his retirement from playing, Avila coached the San Diego Nomads U-15 team in MLS Next in 2021 and early 2022. On March 3, 2022, Avila returned to Birmingham Legion to serve as the Legion's Academy director and first team assistant coach.

== International career ==
Avila entered the US U17 Residency Program in Bradenton, Florida in the fall of 2003. He made his first appearance with US U-17's at the age of 15 against England. He went on to earn 9 international caps with the U-17's, appearing in 15 total matches. The total was the highest of the 1987 boys class. His last appearance came in Spring of 2005.

He helped lead the U.S. to the finals of the Ballymena International Tournament held in Northern Ireland, which he regards as one of his most memorable moments in sports. He also participated in the Mondial Minimes Montaigu Vendee Tournament held in France. In addition to tournaments, he played in a number of matches against Major League Soccer teams, including Los Angeles Galaxy, Chicago Fire, and Columbus Crew, while scoring the game-tying goal in a friendly against the San Jose Earthquakes.

== Career statistics ==
As of October 5, 2019

Club	Season	League			Playoffs (Note: All appearances in the MLS Cup Playoffs)		Cup (Note: Includes the U.S. Open Cup and Canadian Championship)		Continental		Total	
Club	Season	Division	Apps	Goals	Apps	Goals	Apps	Goals	Apps	Goals	Apps	Goals
San Fernando Valley Quakes	2006	PDL	3	0	–		–		–		3	0
Ventura County Fusion	2007	PDL	10	1	–		–		–		10	1
FC Dallas	2008	MLS	14	0	–		2	0	–		16	0
FC Dallas	2009	MLS	18	1	–		1	0	–		19	1
FC Dallas	2010	MLS	18	1	2	1	1	0	–		21	2
FC Dallas	2011	MLS	13	1	0	0	1	0	0	0	14	1
FC Dallas	Total		63	3	2	1	5	0	0	0	70	4
Toronto FC	2011	MLS	9	1	–		0	0	0	0	9	1
Toronto FC	2012	MLS	24	1	–		4	0	2	0	30	1
Toronto FC	Total		33	2	0	0	4	0	2	0	39	2
Chivas USA	2013	MLS	28	3	–		1	0	–		29	3
Chivas USA	2014	MLS	29	0	–		1	0	–		30	0
Chivas USA	Total		57	3	0	0	2	0	0	0	59	3
Santos Laguna	2014–15	Liga MX	0	0	0	0	0	0	0	0	0	0
Santos Laguna	2015–16	Liga MX	0	0	0	0	0	0	0	0	0	0
Santos Laguna	Total		0	0	0	0	0	0	0	0	0	0
Orlando City (loan)	2015	MLS	21	1	–		3	0	–		24	1
Tampa Bay Rowdies	2016	USL	30	4	–		2	0	–		32	4
Phoenix Rising	2017	USL	11	1	0	0	2	1	–		13	2
ASC San Diego	2018	NPSL	7	1	0	0	–		–		7	1
Las Vegas Lights	2018	USL	22	0	–		1	0	–		23	0
Birmingham Legion	2019	USL Championship	27	0	0	0	2	0	–		29	0
Career total			284	16	2	1	21	1	2	0	309	18

== Awards and honors ==
UC Santa Barbara

- NCAA Men's Division I Soccer Championship: 2006

FC Dallas

- Major League Soccer Western Conference Championship: 2010

Toronto FC

- Canadian Championship: 2012
