= George John (soccer) =

American soccer player

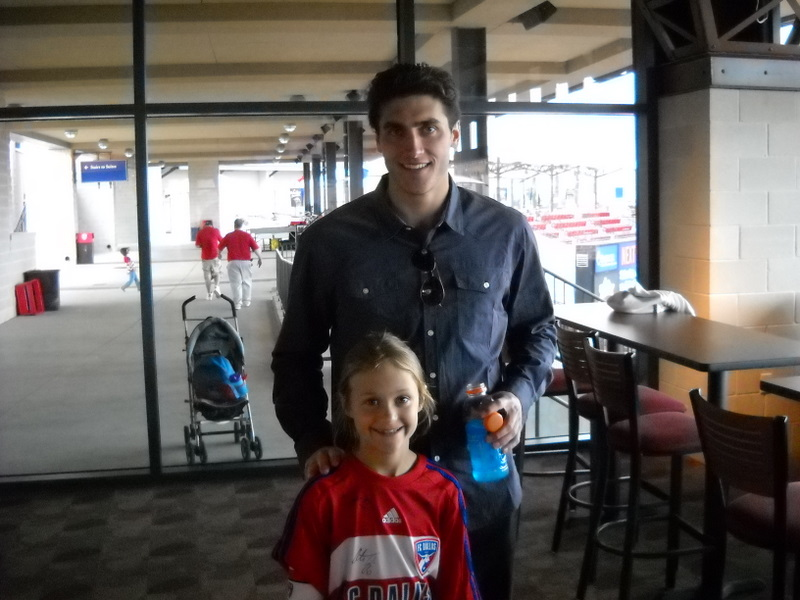

Personal information
- Date of birth: March 20, 1987 (age 39)
- Place of birth: Shoreline, Washington, U.S.
- Height: 6 ft 3 in (1.91 m)
- Position: Defender

College career
Years	Team	Apps	(Gls)
2005–2008	Washington Huskies		

Senior career*
Years	Team	Apps	(Gls)
2009–2014	FC Dallas	119	(6)
2012	→ West Ham United (loan)	0	(0)
- * Club domestic league appearances and goals as of October 28, 2014

George John (born March 20, 1987) is an American former soccer player who played for FC Dallas in Major League Soccer.

== Youth and college soccer ==
John was raised in Shoreline, Washington. He played youth soccer for Emerald City FC in Seattle. He was later the team captain of his youth club leading the Crossfire Premier to an U-18 Premier I Division Championship and a U-18 Washington State Championship. In 2011, John was inducted into the inaugural class of the Crossfire Premier Hall of Fame, along with fellow professional soccer players Ellis McLoughlin and Preston Zimmerman. John also played soccer for Shorewood High School where he was team captain and a 2004 NSCAA High School Adidas All-American honoree. John's jersey (#11) was retired by the school during a ceremony in 2011.

John played college soccer at the University of Washington, leading the Huskies to back-to-back trips to the second round of the NCAA Division I Men's Soccer Tournament in 2006 and 2007. Among other honors he received, he was selected as a two-time first-team All-Pac-10 selection, a two-time first-team NSCAA Scholar All-American, and was the 2008 Pac-10 Soccer Scholar Athlete of the Year.

== Professional career ==
=== FC Dallas ===
John was drafted in the first round (14th overall) by FC Dallas in the 2009 MLS SuperDraft. He made his professional debut on 4 April 2009, in a game against the New England Revolution.

In the 2010 MLS season, John started 25 of 30 regular season games, and helped Dallas set a franchise-best goals against average of 0.93. Dallas qualified for the 2010 MLS Cup Playoffs, and reached the MLS Cup, losing to the Colorado Rapids off of an Extra Time own goal scored by John. In August 2011 English Premier League team Blackburn Rovers bid £1.2 million to sign John. The player was keen to make the move, but the transfer fell through.

=== West Ham United ===
On January 13, 2012, John signed a two-month loan deal with English Championship side West Ham United . The deal included an option to make the transfer permanent. John scored in his first game for The Hammers, a reserve match against Gillingham. However, he was unable to displace West Ham's regular starting center backs and returned to Dallas at the end of his loan having made zero appearances for West Ham's first team.

=== Return to FC Dallas ===
On March 2, 2012, John returned to FC Dallas having not played a single senior game for The Hammers. West Ham decided not to pick up their option to make the move permanent. John played 24 regular-season matches for FC Dallas in 2013 and scored two goals. He was named to the MLS all-star team's inactive list on July 31, 2013. John spent the entire 2014 on injured reserve before being selected by New York City FC in the 2014 expansion draft on Dec. 10.

=== Bottle Gate ===
A beer bottle struck FC Dallas defender George John in the head moments after he scored what turned out to be the game-winning goal against the L.A. Galaxy. MLSSoccer reports the bottle was thrown by a fan sitting in the north end at FC Dallas Stadium, which is where some of the club's most vocal and boisterous supporters enjoy FC Dallas' home games. John, 26, headed home the game's only goal in the 87th minute, but he barely had time to celebrate. The bottle hit him as he took his first steps out of the Galaxy goal, and he fell straight to the ground. "I knew something hit me," John said. "I wasn't quite sure what happened, if I ran into the post or what, but then I looked down and saw a beer bottle and I was like that had to have hit me. I felt [my head] and there was a ridge and then I was like 'Yes, something hit me for sure.' Luckily I didn't need stitches and I was able to stay in and finish out the game." FC Dallas has identified the person who threw the bottle, and that fan was reportedly arrested. "It is always unacceptable to throw anything onto the field of play because it endangers the safety of all players and personnel," a club statement said. "In this specific incident, we have identified the individual and we are proceeding according to protocol with FC Dallas Stadium, security, Frisco Police and Major League Soccer." The cut John suffered required staples to close, according to the Dallas Morning News. He had problems with concussions in the past, but he was reportedly in good health and spirits after the game.

=== New York City FC ===
Selected by New York City FC in the 2014 MLS Expansion Draft on December 10, 2014. Despite appearing to have been signed by the club, going as far as to appear on the club roster and in the club media guide, John was never officially signed by New York City FC.

== International ==
George was eligible to play for both the United States and Greece, and has been called up to train with both squads. In September 2013 he stated in a Greek sports site that his desire is to play for the Greece national team and that he has informed the Greek Football Federation that he is available to play for the team.

== Career statistics ==
As of 7 July 2013

Club	Season	League		Playoffs		Cup		Champions League		Total	
Club	Season	Apps	Goals	Apps	Goals	Apps	Goals	Apps	Goals	Apps	Goals
FC Dallas	2009	16	1	—		—		—		16	1
FC Dallas	2010	25	0	3	1	—		—		28	1
FC Dallas	2011	31	3	1	0	2	0	7	0	41	3
FC Dallas	2012	23	0	—		1	0	—		24	0
FC Dallas	2013	24	2	—		2	0	—		26	2
West Ham United (loan)	2012	0	0	—		—		—		0	0
Career total		119	6	4	1	5	0	7	0	135	7

== Honors ==
FC Dallas

- Major League Soccer Western Conference Championship (1): 2010
