= David Ferreira =

Colombian footballer (born 1979)

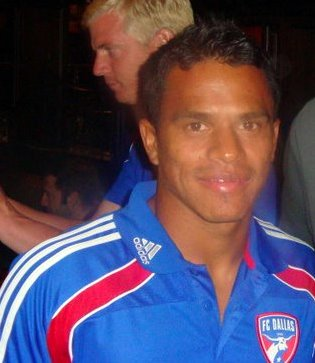
- Ferreira with FC Dallas in 2011

Personal information
- Full name: David Arturo Ferreira Rico
- Date of birth: August 9, 1979 (age 47)
- Place of birth: Santa Marta, Colombia
- Height: 1.66 m (5 ft 5 in)
- Position: Attacking midfielder

Youth career
- 1997–1998: Expreso Rojo

Senior career*
Years	Team	Apps	(Gls)
1999	Real Cartagena	0	(0)
2000–2005	América de Cali	217	(28)
2005–2010	Atlético Paranaense	118	(23)
2008	→ Al-Shabab (loan)	12	(1)
2009–2010	→ FC Dallas (loan)	64	(18)
2011–2013	FC Dallas	53	(8)
2014	Santa Fe	9	(0)
2015	Atlético Huila	38	(7)
2016–2017	América de Cali	32	(1)
2017	Real Cartagena	14	(4)
2018–2019	Unión Magdalena	53	(3)
Total		610	(93)

International career
2001–2008	Colombia	39	(3)
- * Club domestic league appearances and goals

David Arturo Ferreira Rico (born August 9, 1979) is a Colombian former footballer who played as a midfielder.

== Career ==
=== Professional ===
Ferreira began his professional career in 1997 with the Colombian Primera B club Expresso Rojo. By 1999 he had joined Real Cartagena, helping them win a league title. In 2000, he joined América de Cali in the first division, helping the team win three consecutive championships from 2000 to 2002 before moving to Brazilian club Atletico Paranaense in 2005. In his debut season with the club he scored 9 goals, including a notable performance in a 4-2 victory against Copa Libertadores champions Sao Paulo where he scored twice. He was also known as one of the club's best players for the 2005 season. During his stay with Atletico Paranaense, from 2005 to 2008, he appeared in 179 games, starting in 175 of them while scoring 38 goals and recording 42 assists. He also appeared in the first-ever USA-Brazil Challenge game against his soon-to-be team FC Dallas in Curitiba, Brazil on March 7, 2007. From February to June 2008, David was on loan to club Al-Shabab in Dubai making 12 appearances and helping the team win the league title before returning to Atletico Paranaense.

On February 24, 2009, Ferreira was loaned to FC Dallas in Major League Soccer. He was named MLS league MVP on November 19, 2010, after scoring eight goals and adding 13 assists during the regular season. In the playoffs, he also scored a goal against the LA Galaxy in the Western Conference finals and the club's lone goal in their MLS Cup Final loss to the Colorado Rapids. On December 20, 2010, it was announced that FC Dallas had signed him to a multi-year contract, purchasing his rights from Atletico Paranaense. He was named to the MLS Team of Week 4 in the 2011 MLS season for his two-goal performance against the Rapids. On April 24, 2011, he suffered a season-ending injury while playing against the Vancouver Whitecaps. After an absence of more than a year, on July 4, 2012, he finally made his return to the field appearing in the second half against Toronto FC. He captained the squad during the 2013 season. However, his play never returned to the high level that it was before his 2011 injury, and the club declined his contract option following the season. David then returned to play in his native Colombia, signing for Independiente Santa Fe. For the 2015 season, he played with Atlético Huila, followed by a transfer back to América de Cali a decade later, being part of the squad that gained promotion back to the Categoria Primera A. He retired from professional football playing for his hometown club Unión Magdalena at the end of the Apertura 2019 season.

=== International ===
Ferreira was a member of the Colombia national team, winning the Copa América in 2001, and taking part in Copa América tournaments in 2004 and 2007.

== Personal life ==
David is the father of Jesús Ferreira, who plays professionally for Seattle Sounders FC and the United States national team.

== Honours ==
=== Club ===
Real Cartagena

- Categoría Primera B: 1999

América de Cali

- Categoría Primera B: 2016
- Categoría Primera A: 2000, 2001, 2002

Al-Shabab

- UAE League: 2007–08

FC Dallas

- Major League Soccer Western Conference Championship: 2010

=== International ===
Colombia

- Toulon Tournament: 1999, 2000
- Copa America: 2001

=== Individual ===
- MLS Best XI: 2010
- MLS MVP: 2010

Sporting positions
Preceded by Ugo Ihemelu	FC Dallas captain 2013–2013	Succeeded by Andrew Jacobson
