= Omar Cummings =

Jamaican footballer (born 1982)

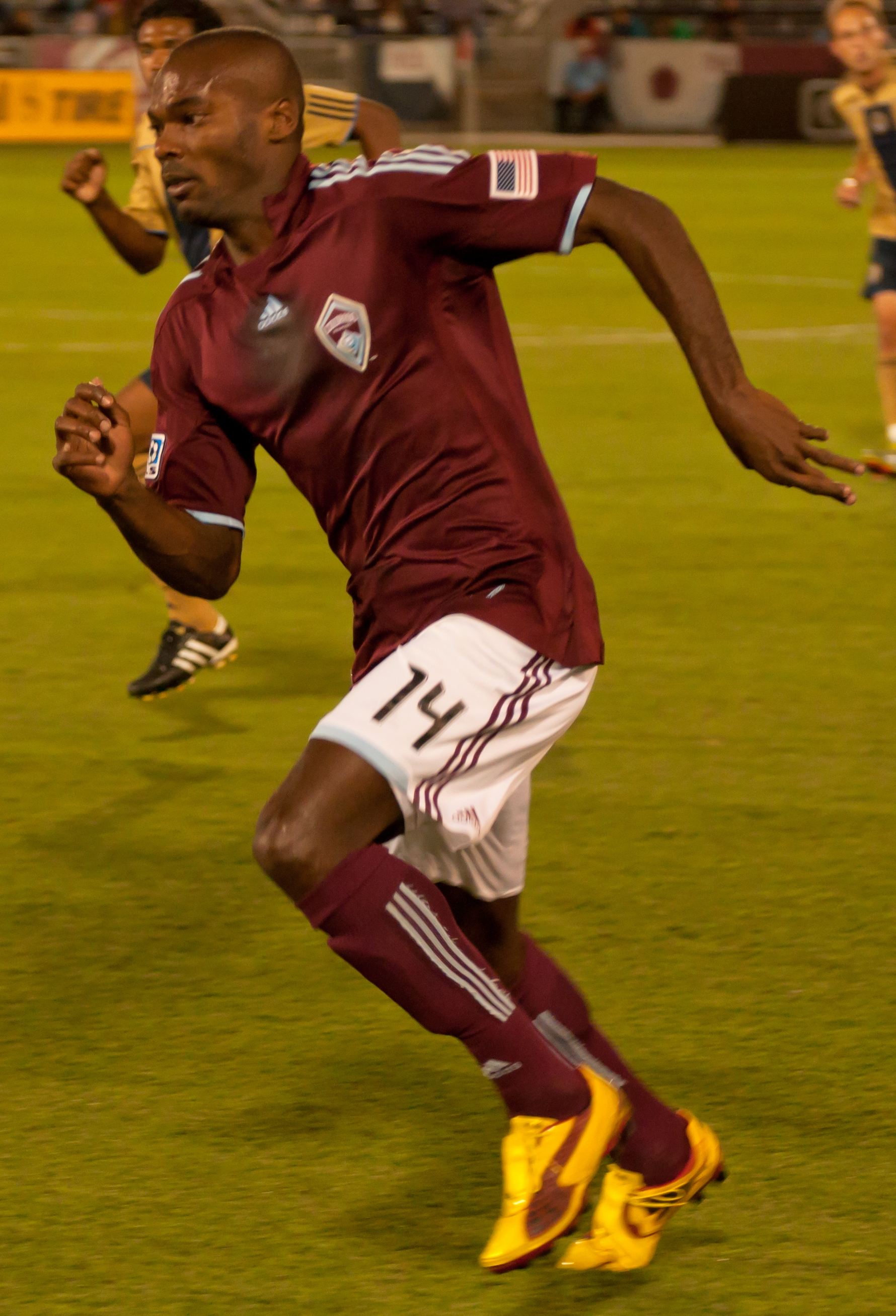
- Cummings with Colorado Rapids in 2010

Personal information
- Date of birth: 13 July 1982 (age 44)
- Place of birth: Old Harbour, Jamaica
- Height: 5 ft 10 in (1.78 m)
- Position: Forward

Youth career
- 2002–2003: Rivoli United

College career
Years	Team	Apps	(Gls)
2003–2004	Cincinnati State College		
2005–2006	Cincinnati Bearcats		

Senior career*
Years	Team	Apps	(Gls)
2007–2012	Colorado Rapids	148	(39)
2013–2014	Houston Dynamo	37	(3)
2015	San Antonio Scorpions	29	(10)
2016–2017	FC Cincinnati	20	(3)
Total		234	(55)

International career
2008–2012	Jamaica	35	(7)
- * Club domestic league appearances and goals

Omar Cummings (born 13 July 1982) is a former Jamaican international footballer who played as a forward. He spent his entire professional career in the United States.

== Career ==
=== Youth and amateur ===
Cummings attended Jonathan Grant High School, Cincinnati State College and the University of Cincinnati, where he majored in criminal justice.

=== Professional ===
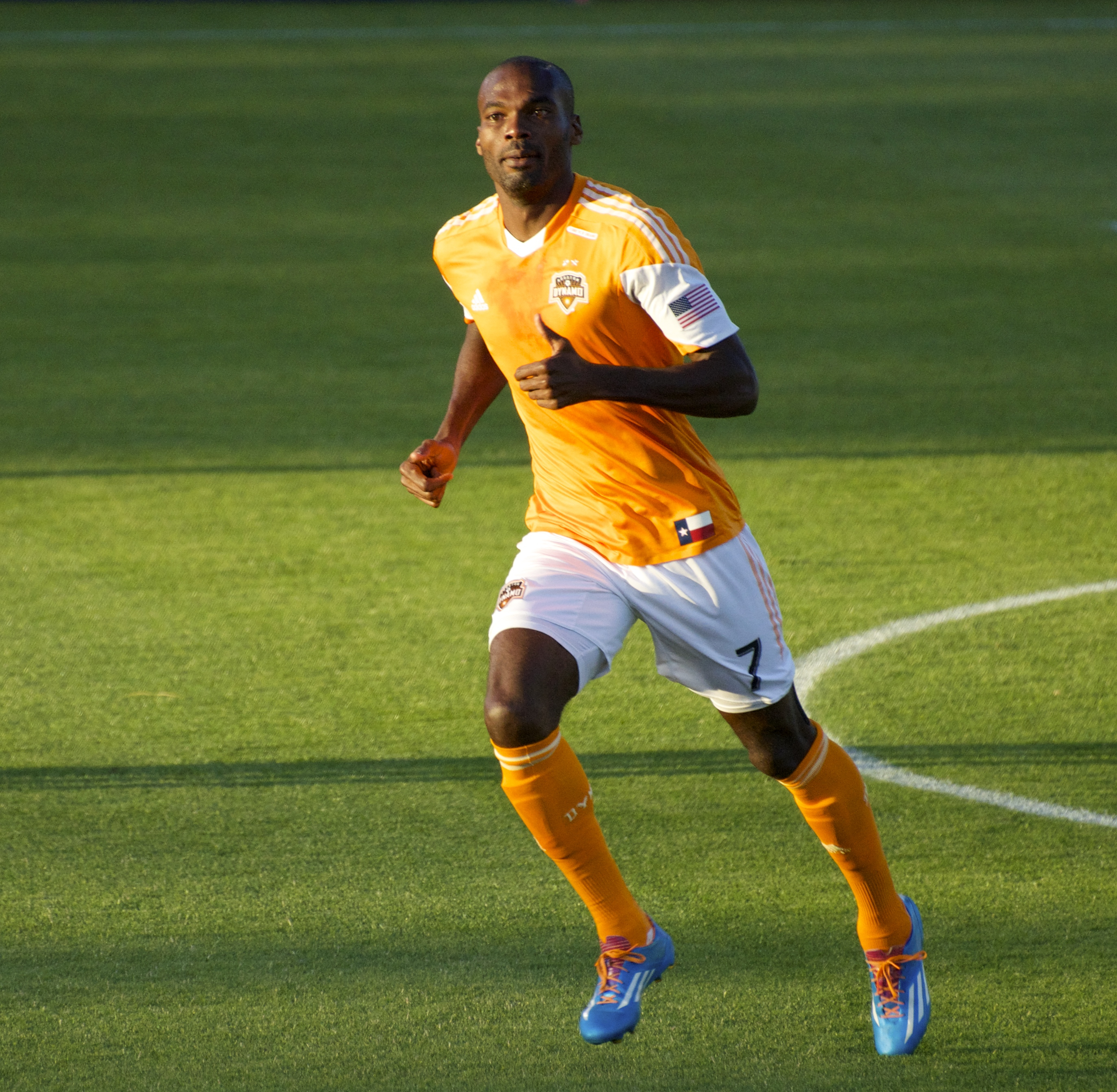
Cummings with Houston Dynamo in 2014

Cummings was selected by the Colorado Rapids in the 2007 MLS SuperDraft as a Round 3, number 31 overall pick. On 4 September 2010, Cummings scored two goals to help the Rapids to a 3–0 victory over Chivas USA at Dick's Sporting Goods Park. The performance led to him being voted as Major League Soccer Player of the Week for Week 23 of the MLS season by the North American Soccer Reporters (NASR). On 27 December 2010, it was announced that the Colorado Rapids had granted Cummings permission to trial with English Premier League club Aston Villa. On 17 January 2011, Aston Villa manager Gérard Houllier announced that Cummings had impressed on the trial. Due to work permit issues, a deal did not proceed.

Having returned to play for Colorado again in 2010, Cummings made his 100th MLS appearance for the Rapids on 30 April 2010, in a game against Chicago Fire.

On 22 December 2012 Cummings was traded to Houston Dynamo in exchange for Nathan Sturgis and allocation money. He remained with Houston for two years.

In 2015, Cummings signed with San Antonio Scorpions of the North American Soccer League. He enjoyed a successful season, scoring 10 goals in 29 matches.

On 21 January 2016, Cummings signed with expansion side FC Cincinnati of the United Soccer League.

On 23 July 2017, FC Cincinnati announced that Cummings would be retiring from professional soccer. He played his final match the following day in an international friendly against Valencia CF. During the match's halftime, the club honored Cummings with a brief ceremony and presented him with a framed jersey. Following his retirement, Cummings joined the front office of FC Cincinnati working on youth academy and community initiatives.

=== International ===
Cummings made his international debut for Jamaica in July 2008.

== Personal life ==
Cummings is the cousin of fellow soccer players Rafe Wolfe, Wolry Wolfe and Kemeel Wolfe.

Cummings holds a U.S. green card which qualifies him as a domestic player for MLS roster purposes.

== Career statistics ==
=== International ===
Appearances and goals by national team and year
National team	Year	Apps	Goals
Jamaica	2008	10	2
Jamaica	2009	5	1
Jamaica	2010	6	2
Jamaica	2011	6	2
Jamaica	2012	8	0
Total		35	7

Scores and results list Jamaica's goal tally first, score column indicates score after each Cummings goal.

List of international goals scored by Omar Cummings
No.	Date	Venue	Opponent	Score	Result	Competition
1	9 November 2008	Truman Bodden Stadium, George Town, Cayman Islands	Cayman Islands	1–0	2–0	Friendly
2	19 November 2008	Independence Park, Kingston	Canada	3–0	3–0	2010 FIFA World Cup qualification
3	10 July 2009	FIU Stadium, Miami, United States	El Salvador	1–0	1–0	2009 CONCACAF Gold Cup
4	7 September 2010	Lockhart Stadium, Fort Lauderdale, United States	Peru	1–1	1–2	Friendly
5	5 December 2010	Stade Pierre-Aliker, Fort-de-France, Martinique	Guadeloupe	1–1	1–1 (5–4 p)	2010 Caribbean Cup
6	29 March 2011	Estadio Cuscatlán, San Salvador, El Salvador	El Salvador	3–1	3–2	Friendly
7	2 September 2011	Atahualpa Olympic Stadium, Quito, Ecuador	Ecuador	1–4	2–5	Friendly
