= 2010 MLS Cup playoffs =

2010 edition of the MLS playoffs

Tournament details
- Country: United States; Canada
- Teams: 8

Final positions
- Champions: Colorado Rapids (1st title)
- Runners-up: FC Dallas
- Semifinalists: Los Angeles Galaxy; San Jose Earthquakes

Tournament statistics
- Matches played: 11
- Goals scored: 25 (2.27 per match)
- Attendance: 214,885 (19,535 per match)
- Top goal scorer(s): (United States) Edson Buddle (United States) Conor Casey (United States) Bobby Convey (Colombia) David Ferreira (2 goals each)

The 2010 MLS Cup playoffs was the postseason tournament subsequent to Major League Soccer's 2010 season.

The playoffs began on October 30, with the Los Angeles Galaxy defeating Seattle Sounders FC in the conference semifinals. Three weeks later, the Colorado Rapids defeated FC Dallas 2–1 in MLS Cup played at BMO Field in Toronto, Ontario. It was Colorado's first title and second MLS Cup final appearance, and it was FC Dallas's first appearance in an MLS Cup final.

Of the eight MLS clubs to earn qualification into the tournament, only four of them qualified the season before; the Columbus Crew, Los Angeles Galaxy, Seattle Sounders FC, and the defending champions, Real Salt Lake. The San Jose Earthquakes were making their first playoff appearance since 2005, and it was Dallas' first since 2007. It was Colorado's and the New York Red Bulls's first appearance since 2008.

== Format ==
At the 2010 season's end, the top two teams of each conference advanced to the playoffs; in addition the clubs with the next four highest point totals, regardless of conference, were also added to the playoffs for a total of eight clubs. In the first round of the knockout tournament, aggregate (total) goals over two matches would determine the winners; the Conference Championships was one match each, with the winner of each conference advancing to MLS Cup. In all rounds, the tie-breaking method would be two 15-minute periods of extra time, followed by penalty kicks if necessary. The away goals rule was not used.

== Qualified teams ==
=== Conference standings ===
Eastern Conference

Pos	Team	Pld	W	L	T	GF	GA	GD	Pts	Qualification
1	New York Red Bulls	30	15	9	6	38	29	+9	51	MLS Cup Playoffs
2	Columbus Crew	30	14	8	8	40	34	+6	50	MLS Cup Playoffs
3	Kansas City Wizards	30	11	13	6	36	35	+1	39	
4	Chicago Fire	30	9	12	9	37	38	−1	36	
5	Toronto FC	30	9	13	8	33	41	−8	35	
6	New England Revolution	30	9	16	5	32	50	−18	32	
7	Philadelphia Union	30	8	15	7	35	49	−14	31	
8	D.C. United	30	6	20	4	21	47	−26	22	

Source: MLS

Western Conference

Pos	Team	Pld	W	L	T	GF	GA	GD	Pts	Qualification
1	LA Galaxy	30	18	7	5	44	26	+18	59	MLS Cup Playoffs
2	Real Salt Lake	30	15	4	11	45	20	+25	56	MLS Cup Playoffs
3	FC Dallas	30	12	4	14	42	28	+14	50	MLS Cup Playoffs
4	Seattle Sounders FC	30	14	10	6	39	35	+4	48	MLS Cup Playoffs
5	Colorado Rapids	30	12	8	10	44	32	+12	46	MLS Cup Playoffs
6	San Jose Earthquakes	30	13	10	7	34	33	+1	46	MLS Cup Playoffs
7	Houston Dynamo	30	9	15	6	40	49	−9	33	
8	Chivas USA	30	8	18	4	31	45	−14	28	

Source: MLS

=== Overall standings ===
Pos	Team	Pld	W	L	T	GF	GA	GD	Pts	Qualification
1	LA Galaxy (S)	30	18	7	5	44	26	+18	59	CONCACAF Champions League
2	Real Salt Lake	30	15	4	11	45	20	+25	56	
3	New York Red Bulls	30	15	9	6	38	29	+9	51	
4	FC Dallas	30	12	4	14	42	28	+14	50	CONCACAF Champions League
5	Columbus Crew	30	14	8	8	40	34	+6	50	
6	Seattle Sounders FC	30	14	10	6	39	35	+4	48	CONCACAF Champions League
7	Colorado Rapids (C)	30	12	8	10	44	32	+12	46	CONCACAF Champions League
8	San Jose Earthquakes	30	13	10	7	34	33	+1	46	
9	Kansas City Wizards	30	11	13	6	36	35	+1	39	
10	Chicago Fire	30	9	12	9	37	38	−1	36	
11	Toronto FC	30	9	13	8	33	41	−8	35	CONCACAF Champions League
12	Houston Dynamo	30	9	15	6	40	49	−9	33	
13	New England Revolution	30	9	16	5	32	50	−18	32	
14	Philadelphia Union	30	8	15	7	35	49	−14	31	
15	Chivas USA	30	8	18	4	31	45	−14	28	
16	D.C. United	30	6	20	4	21	47	−26	22	

Source: MLS
Rules for classification: 1) points; 2) head-to-head record; 3) goal difference; 4) number of goals scored
(C) Champions; (S) Supporters' Shield

== Bracket ==
Conference semifinals
E1	New York Red Bulls	1	1
E4	San Jose Earthquakes	0	3
Eastern Conference
E2	Columbus Crew	0	2 (4)
E3	Colorado Rapids (p)	1	1 (5)
W1	Los Angeles Galaxy	1	2
W4	Seattle Sounders FC	0	1
Western Conference
W2	Real Salt Lake	1	1
W3	FC Dallas	2	1

Conference finals
E4	San Jose Earthquakes	0
E3	Colorado Rapids	1
W1	Los Angeles Galaxy	0
W3	FC Dallas	3

MLS Cup
E3	Colorado Rapids	2
W3	FC Dallas	1

== Conference semifinals ==
=== Eastern Conference ===
October 30
7:00 pm PDT

San Jose Earthquakes	0–1	New York Red Bulls
	Report	Lindpere 56'

Buck Shaw Stadium, Santa Clara, California
Attendance: 10,525
Referee: Paul Ward
November 4
8:00 pm EDT

New York Red Bulls	1–3	San Jose Earthquakes
Ángel 78'	Report	Convey 8', 76'; Wondolowski 81'

Red Bull Arena, Harrison, New Jersey
Attendance: 22,839
Referee: Mark Geiger

San Jose Earthquakes won 3–2 on aggregate.

October 28
7:00 pm MDT

Colorado Rapids	1–0	Columbus Crew
Mastroeni 23'	Report

Dick's Sporting Goods Park, Commerce City, Colorado
Attendance: 11,872
Referee: Jair Marrufo
November 6
4:00 pm EDT

Columbus Crew	2–1 (a.e.t.)	Colorado Rapids
Gaven 22'; Rogers 70'	Report	Casey 84'
Penalties
Barros Schelotto (penalty scored); Garey (penalty scored); Gaven (penalty scored); Brunner (penalty scored); Carroll (penalty missed)	4–5	(penalty scored) Casey; (penalty scored) Kandji; (penalty scored) Larentowicz; (penalty scored) Lopez; (penalty scored) Baudet

Columbus Crew Stadium, Columbus, Ohio
Attendance: 10,322
Referee: Michael Kennedy

2–2 on aggregate. Colorado Rapids won 5–4 on penalties.

=== Western Conference ===
October 30
4:00 pm CDT

FC Dallas	2–1	Real Salt Lake
Cunningham 44'; Avila 88'	Report	Espindola 5'

Pizza Hut Park, Frisco, Texas
Attendance: 11,003
Referee: Kevin Stott
November 6
8:00 pm MDT

Real Salt Lake	1–1	FC Dallas
Findley 79'	Report	McCarty 17'

Rio Tinto Stadium, Sandy, Utah
Attendance: 19,324
Referee: Jorge Gonzalez

FC Dallas won 3–2 on aggregate.

October 31
5:00 pm PDT

Seattle Sounders FC	0–1	Los Angeles Galaxy
	Report	Buddle 38'

Qwest Field, Seattle, Washington
Attendance: 35,521
Referee: Alex Prus
November 7
6:00 pm PST

Los Angeles Galaxy	2–1	Seattle Sounders FC
Buddle 19'; Gonzalez 27'	Report	Zakuani 86'

Home Depot Center, Carson, California
Attendance: 27,000
Referee: Baldomero Toledo

Los Angeles Galaxy won 3–1 on aggregate.

== Conference finals ==
=== Eastern Conference ===
November 13
7:30 pm MST

Colorado Rapids	1–0	San Jose Earthquakes
Kimura 42'	Report

Dick's Sporting Goods Park, Commerce City, Colorado
Attendance: 17,779
Referee: Jorge Gonzalez

=== Western Conference ===
November 14
6:00 pm PST

Los Angeles Galaxy	0–3	FC Dallas
	Report	Ferreira 26'; John 54'; Chavez 73'

Home Depot Center, Carson, California
Attendance: 27,000
Referee: Jair Marrufo

== MLS Cup 2010 ==
November 21, 2010
8:30 pm EST

Colorado Rapids	2–1 (a.e.t.)	FC Dallas
Casey 57'; John 107' (o.g.)	Report (Archived)	Ferreira 35'

BMO Field, Toronto, Ontario
Attendance: 21,700
Referee: Baldomero Toledo
