= Anthony Wallace (soccer) =

American soccer player

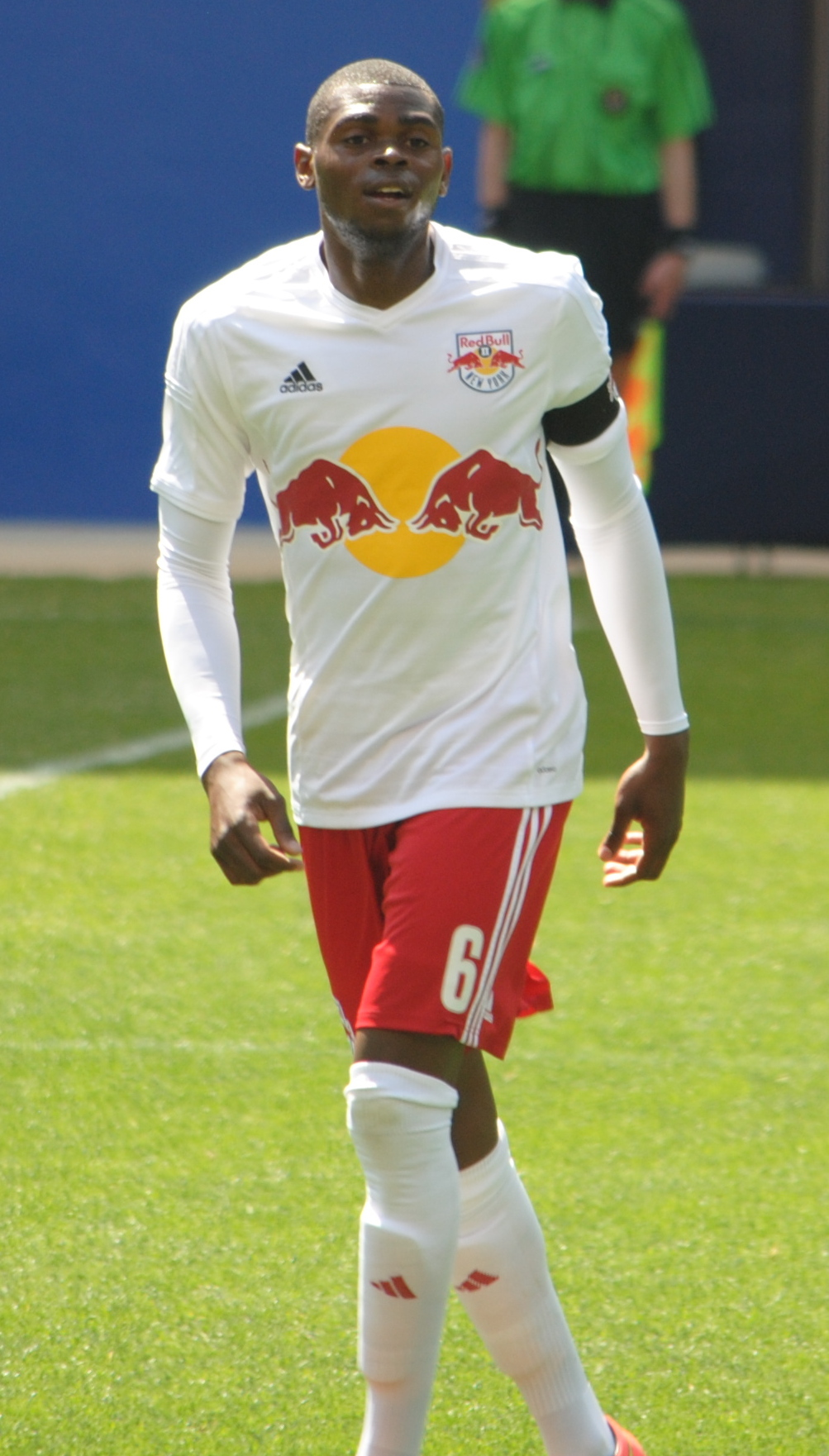
- Anthony Wallace playing for New York Red Bulls II

Personal information
- Full name: Anthony Wallace
- Date of birth: January 26, 1989 (age 37)
- Place of birth: Brooklyn, New York, United States
- Height: 5 ft 11 in (1.80 m)
- Position: Left back

Youth career
- 2004–2006: IMG Soccer Academy

College career
Years	Team	Apps	(Gls)
2006	South Florida Bulls	19	(0)

Senior career*
Years	Team	Apps	(Gls)
2007–2010	FC Dallas	15	(0)
2010–2013	Colorado Rapids	23	(0)
2014	Tampa Bay Rowdies	25	(1)
2015	New York Red Bulls	6	(2)
2015	→ New York Red Bulls II (loan)	6	(1)
2016	Jacksonville Armada	17	(0)
2017	Oklahoma City Energy	29	(0)

International career^{‡}
2004–2006	United States U17	18	(0)
2007–2009	United States U20	25	(2)
2011	United States	1	(0)
- * Club domestic league appearances and goals as of 12:57, 21 October 2017 (UTC) ‡ National team caps and goals as of January 22, 2011

Anthony Wallace (born January 26, 1989) is an American soccer player who plays as a left back and midfielder.

== Career ==
=== Professional ===
Wallace signed with Major League Soccer as a Generation Adidas player and was selected by FC Dallas as the ninth overall pick in the 2007 MLS SuperDraft. After making six appearances for Dallas' reserve team, Wallace made his debut for Dallas on September 15, 2007, in a 4–2 defeat to New England Revolution.

Wallace was traded to Colorado Rapids on July 30, 2010, in exchange for a fourth-round selection in the 2011 MLS SuperDraft and a conditional selection in the 2012 MLS SuperDraft. On November 24, 2010, Wallace was selected by Portland Timbers in the 2010 MLS Expansion Draft but then immediately traded back to Colorado in exchange for allocation money. While with Colorado Wallace was limited to 23 league matches due to injuries but was a starter for the club during the 2010 MLS Cup Playoffs in which Colorado captured its first MLS Cup. He signed with NASL club Tampa Bay Rowdies on February 10, 2014. On May 24, 2014, Wallace scored his first goal as a professional in a 3–2 victory over rival Fort Lauderdale Strikers. In his one year with Tampa Bay Wallace appeared in 25 league matches and scored one goal.

On March 27, 2015, Wallace signed with New York Red Bulls of Major League Soccer after a successful trial spell. The following day Wallace made his debut with New York, starting in a 2–1 victory over the Columbus Crew. On July 11, 2015, Wallace scored his first goal for New York in a 4–1 victory over New England Revolution. On August 15, 2015, Wallace scored the second goal of the match for New York in a 3–0 victory over Toronto FC.

During the season, Wallace was loaned out to New York Red Bulls affiliate New York Red Bulls II. On May 3, 2015, Wallace scored his first goal for New York Red Bulls II in a 3–2 victory over Pittsburgh Riverhounds, scoring the winning goal in stoppage time.

On 10 June 2016, Wallace signed for Jacksonville Armada.

Wallace spent the 2017 season with USL side Oklahoma City Energy, but was released on November 21, 2017.

=== International ===
Wallace played for the United States Under-17 and Under-18 teams and was a member of the USA Under-20 National squad in the 2007 FIFA U-20 World Cup held in Canada. He played in two of the Group matches against Poland and also played in the knockout stages against Uruguay. Wallace earned his first cap for the senior team in 2011.
