= List of Colorado Rapids seasons =

The Colorado Rapids are a professional American soccer team based in the Denver metropolitan area. They joined Major League Soccer (MLS) as one of the league's charter franchises when it was founded in 1996.

== Key ==
Key to competitions

- Major League Soccer (MLS) – The top-flight of soccer in the United States, established in 1996.
- U.S. Open Cup (USOC) – The premier knockout cup competition in U.S. soccer, first contested in 1914.
- CONCACAF Champions League (CCL) – The premier club competition in North American soccer since 1962. It went by the name of Champions' Cup until 2008.
- Leagues Cup (LC) – The premier club competition between MLS and Liga MX, first contested in 2019.

Key to colors and symbols

1st or W	Winners
2nd or RU	Runners-up
3rd	Third place
Last	Wooden Spoon
♦	MLS Golden Boot
	Highest average attendance
Italics	Ongoing competition

Key to league record

- Season = The year and article of the season
- Div = Division/level on pyramid
- League = League name
- Pld = Games played
- W = Games won
- L = Games lost
- D = Games drawn
- GF = Goals for
- GA = Goals against
- GD = Goal difference
- Pts = Points
- PPG = Points per game
- Conf. = Conference position
- Overall = League position

Key to cup record

- DNE = Did not enter
- DNQ = Did not qualify
- NH = Competition not held or canceled
- QR = Qualifying round
- PR = Preliminary round
- GS = Group stage
- R1 = First round
- R2 = Second round
- R3 = Third round
- R4 = Fourth round
- R5 = Fifth round
- Ro16 = Round of 16
- QF = Quarterfinals
- SF = Semifinals
- F = Final
- RU = Runners-up
- W = Winners

== Seasons ==
Season	League									Position		Playoffs	USOC	Continental		Average attendance (Note: Average attendance only includes statistics from regular season matches.)	Top goalscorer(s) (Note: Top goalscorer(s) includes all goals scored in the regular season, playoffs, U.S. Open Cup, MLS is Back Tournament, Leagues Cup, CONCACAF Champions League, FIFA Club World Cup, and other competitive continental matches.)	
Season	Pld	W	L	D	GF	GA	GD	Pts	PPG	Conf.	Overall	Playoffs	USOC	CCL	LC	Average attendance	Name(s)	Goals
1996	32	11	21	0	44	59	−15	29	0.92	5th	10th	DNQ	SF	DNE	NH	10,213	(United States) Jean Harbor	11
1997	32	14	18	0	50	59	−9	38	1.19	4th	7th	RU	Ro16	DNQ	NH	11,835	(United States) Paul Bravo	13
1998	32	16	16	0	62	69	–7	37	1.38	3rd	5th	QF	DNE	PR	NH	14,812	(Jamaica) Wolde Harris	13
1999	32	20	12	0	38	39	–1	48	1.50	4th	5th	QF	RU	DNQ	NH	14,029	(Panama) Jorge Dely Valdés	10
2000	32	13	15	4	43	59	−16	43	1.34	3rd	8th	QF	R2	DNQ	NH	12,580	(Ghana) Junior Agogo	10
2001	26	5	13	8	36	47	−11	23	0.88	4th	11th	DNQ	R2	DNQ	NH	16,481	(Scotland) John Spencer	14
2002	28	13	11	4	43	48	–5	43	1.54	4th	4th	SF	QF	DNQ	NH	20,690	(United States) Chris Carrieri (United States) Mark Chung	12
2003	30	11	12	7	40	45	–5	40	1.33	3rd	6th	QF	QF	DNQ	NH	16,772	(Scotland) John Spencer	14
2004	30	10	9	11	29	32	–3	41	1.37	3rd	5th	QF	Ro16	DNQ	NH	14,195	(Haiti) Peguero Jean Philippe	8
2005	32	13	13	6	40	37	+3	45	1.41	3rd	7th	SF	Ro16	DNQ	NH	16,638	(United States) Jeff Cunningham	13
2006	32	11	13	8	36	49	–13	41	1.28	4th	7th	SF	QF	DNQ	NH	12,056	(Guatemala) Nicolás Hernández	8
2007	30	9	13	8	29	34	–5	35	1.17	4th	10th	DNQ	R2	DNQ	NH	14,749	(United States) Jovan Kirovski	7
2008	30	11	14	5	44	45	–1	38	1.27	4th	9th	DNQ	QR3	DNQ	NH	13,659	(United States) Conor Casey	12
2009	30	10	10	10	42	38	+4	40	1.33	6th	9th	DNQ	QR2	DNQ	NH	13,018	(United States) Conor Casey	16
2010	30	12	8	10	44	32	+12	46	1.53	5th	7th	W	QR3	DNQ	NH	14,329	(United States) Conor Casey	15
2011	34	12	9	13	46	42	+4	49	1.44	5th	7th	QF	QR2	GS	NH	14,838	(United States) Jeff Larentowicz	8
2012	34	11	19	4	44	50	–6	37	1.09	7th	14th	DNQ	Ro16	DNQ	NH	15,175	(Colombia) Jaime Castrillón	8
2013	34	14	11	9	45	38	+7	51	1.50	5th	8th	R1	R3	DNQ	NH	15,440	(Jamaica) Deshorn Brown	10
2014	34	8	18	8	43	62	−19	32	0.94	8th	17th	DNQ	Ro16	DNQ	NH	15,082	(Jamaica) Deshorn Brown	13
2015	34	9	15	10	33	43	−10	37	1.09	10th	19th	DNQ	Ro16	DNQ	NH	15,657	(Republic of Ireland) Kevin Doyle (United States) Dillon Serna	5
2016	34	15	6	13	39	32	+7	58	1.71	2nd	2nd	SF	Ro16	DNQ	NH	16,278	(Albania) Shkëlzen Gashi	10
2017	34	9	19	6	31	51	− 20	33	0.97	10th	20th	DNQ	Ro16	DNQ	NH	15,322	(Senegal) Dominique Badji	10
2018	34	8	19	7	36	63	−27	31	0.91	11th	21st	DNQ	R4	GS	NH	15,333	(Senegal) Dominique Badji	7
2019	34	12	16	6	58	63	−5	42	1.24	9th	16th	DNQ	R4	DNQ	DNQ	14,284	(Sierra Leone) Kei Kamara	14
2020	18	8	6	4	32	28	+4	28	1.56	5th	10th	R1	NH	DNQ	NH	13,062	(United States) Cole Bassett (United States) Jonathan Lewis	5
2021	34	17	7	10	51	35	+16	61	1.79	1st	2nd	QF	NH	DNQ	DNQ	12,014	(Colombia) Michael Barrios	8
2022	34	11	13	10	46	57	–11	43	1.26	10th	18th	DNQ	Ro32	Ro16	DNQ	14,473	(Chile) Diego Rubio	16
2023	34	5	17	12	26	54	–28	27	0.79	14th	28th	DNQ	Ro16	DNQ	GS	15,409	(United States) Cole Bassett	6
2024	34	15	14	5	61	60	+1	50	1.47	7th	12th	R1	DNE	DNQ	3rd	15,686	(Brazil) Rafael Navarro	15
2025	34	11	15	8	44	56	–12	41	1.21	11th	21st	DNQ	DNE					
Total	952	344	402	206	1,253	1,425	-172	1,214	1.28	—	—	—	—	—	—	—	(United States) Conor Casey	53
