= 2007 Colorado Rapids season =

Colorado Rapids
2007 season
- Coach: Fernando Clavijo
- Stadium: Dick's Sporting Goods Park
- Western Conference (MLS): 4 (9-13-8)
- MLS Playoffs: Did not qualify
- U.S. Open Cup: Quarterfinals
- CONCACAF Champions League: Did not qualify
- North American SuperLiga: Did not qualify
Home colors	Away colors

The 2007 Colorado Rapids season was the twelfth season of the Colorado club franchise. The team entered the season having been eliminated from the 2006 MLS Playoffs in the Conference Finals. The Rapids, however, enter as the defending champions of the MLS Reserve Division.

For 2007, the Rapids revealed new team colors, uniforms and crest. The Colorado Rapids begin play in their new soccer-specific stadium, Dick's Sporting Goods Park.

== Offseason ==
=== 2006 Colorado Rapids ===
Note: Flags indicate national team as defined under FIFA eligibility rules; some limited exceptions apply. Players may hold more than one non-FIFA nationality.

No.	Pos.	Nation	Player
1	GK	USA	Joe Cannon
2	DF	USA	Hunter Freeman
3	DF	USA	Eric Denton
4	DF	USA	Dan Gargan
5	MF	USA	Kyle Beckerman
7	FW	USA	Jovan Kirovski
8	FW	USA	Luchi Gonzalez
9	FW	USA	Clint Mathis
10	MF	CMR	Alain Nkong
11	MF	ENG	Terry Cooke
12	DF	USA	Mike Petke
13	FW	LBR	Melvin Tarley
14	FW	HAI	Fabrice Noël
15	FW	USA	Jacob Peterson
16	DF	USA	Chris Wingert

No.	Pos.	Nation	Player
18	DF	ESP	Aitor Karanka
20	FW	ARG	Nicolas Hernández
21	DF	USA	Matt Crawford
22	GK	USA	Matt Jordan
23	MF	USA	Colin Clark
24	GK	SEN	Bouna Coundoul
25	MF	USA	Pablo Mastroeni
26	DF	USA	Jordan Harvey
27	DF	USA	Stephen Keel
30	FW	BRA	Thiago Martins
31	FW	BLR	Sasha Gotsmanov
32	FW	USA	Aaron King
33	MF	USA	Daniel Wasson
NA	GK	USA	Peter Dzubay

=== Changes for the 2007 MLS Season ===
In

- (United States) Ugo Ihemelu Traded from Los Angeles
- (United States) Herculez Gomez Traded from Los Angeles
- (United States) Nico Colaluca Signed as draft pick
- (Jamaica) Omar Cummings Signed as draft pick
- (United States) John DiRaimondo Signed as draft pick
- (United States) Justin Hughes Signed as draft pick
- (Japan) Kosuke Kimura Signed as draft pick
- (United States) Nick LaBrocca Signed as draft pick
- (Uruguay) José Cancela Traded from Toronto FC
- (United States) Conor Casey Traded from Toronto FC
- (United States) Brandon Prideaux Traded from D.C.
- (United States) Zach Thornton Traded from Chicago
- (Argentina) Facundo Erpen Traded from D.C.
- (Morocco) Mehdi Ballouchy Traded from Real Salt Lake
- (Mexico) Daniel Osorno Free Transfer
- (United States) Tony Sanneh Traded from Chicago

Out

- (United States) Kyle Beckerman Traded to Real Salt Lake for Mehdi Ballouchy
- (United States) Greg Vanney Traded to D.C. for Facundo Erpen
- (United States) Joe Cannon Traded to Los Angeles
- (United States) Matt Crawford Released by team
- (United States) Eric Denton Released by team, rights subsequently traded to New York Red Bulls
- (United States) Hunter Freeman Traded to New York Red Bulls
- (United States) Luchi Gonzalez Released by team, subsequently signed with Miami FC of the USL-1
- (Belarus) Sasha Gotsmanov Released by team, subsequently signed with Minnesota Thunder of the USL-1
- (United States) Matt Jordan Released by team
- (Spain) Aitor Karanka Released by team
- (United States) Aaron King Released by team. Joined Charleston Battery of USL-1
- (Brazil) Thiago Martins Transferred to Bodø/Glimt of the Norwegian Adeccoligaen
- (United States) Clint Mathis Traded to New York Red Bulls
- (Haiti) Fabrice Noël Released by team
- (Cameroon) Alain Nkong Released by team
- (Canada) Riley O'Neill Traded to Toronto FC
- (Liberia) Melvin Tarley Released by team, subsequently signed with Puerto Rico Islanders of the USL-1
- (Panama) Roberto Brown Released by team

=== 2007 MLS SuperDraft ===
Round/Pick	Player	Position	College
1/6	Nico Colaluca	Midfielder	Virginia
2/17	Greg Dalby	Midfielder	Notre Dame
3/31	Omar Cummings	Forward	Cincinnati
3/35	Nick LaBrocca	Midfielder	Rutgers
3/36	Justin Hughes	Goalkeeper	North Carolina

== Chance at a comeback ==
=== 2007 final roster ===
As of October 21, 2007 Note: Flags indicate national team as defined under FIFA eligibility rules; some limited exceptions apply. Players may hold more than one non-FIFA nationality.

No.	Pos.	Nation	Player
1	GK	SEN	Bouna Coundoul
2	DF	USA	Jordan Harvey
3	DF	ARG	Facundo Erpen
4	DF	USA	Dan Gargan
6	DF	USA	Brandon Prideaux
7	FW	USA	Jovan Kirovski
8	MF	MAR	Mehdi Ballouchy
9	MF	URU	José Cancela
10	FW	USA	Herculez Gomez
11	MF	ENG	Terry Cooke
12	DF	USA	Mike Petke
13	DF	USA	Stephen Keel
14	FW	JAM	Omar Cummings
15	FW	USA	Jacob Peterson

No.	Pos.	Nation	Player
16	FW	MEX	Daniel Osorno
18	DF	USA	Ugo Ihemelu
20	FW	ARG	Nicolas Hernández
21	MF	USA	Nico Colaluca
22	MF	USA	Nick LaBrocca
23	MF	USA	Colin Clark
25	MF	USA	Pablo Mastroeni (captain)
26	FW	USA	Conor Casey
27	MF	JPN	Kosuke Kimura
28	MF	USA	John DiRaimondo
29	DF	USA	Tony Sanneh
30	GK	USA	Justin Hughes
31	GK	USA	Zach Thornton
32	DF	USA	Clifton Wilmes

== Western Conference standings ==
Western Conference
Team		Pts	GP	W	L	T	GF	GA	GD
1	y-Chivas USA	53	30	15	7	8	46	28	18
2	x-Houston Dynamo	52	30	15	8	7	43	23	20
3	x-FC Dallas	44	30	13	12	5	37	44	-7
4	Colorado Rapids	35	30	9	13	8	29	34	-5
5	Los Angeles Galaxy	34	30	9	14	7	38	48	-10
6	Real Salt Lake	27	30	6	15	9	31	45	-14

x = Clinched playoff berth
y = Clinched home field for Conf. Champ.

Last Updated 2016-07-19

== Results by round ==
Round	1	2	3	4	5	6	7	8	9	10	11	12	13	14	15	16	17	18	19	20	21	22	23	24	25	26	27	28	29	30
Stadium	H	H	A	A	H	H	A	H	H	A	A	A	H	A	A	H	H	A	A	H	H	H	A	A	H	A	A	H	A	H
Result	W	D	L	W	L	D	W	D	W	L	L	L	L	L	D	D	L	D	L	W	W	W	D	L	D	L	L	W	W	L

Source: Colorado Rapids
A = Away; H = Home; W = Win; D = Draw; L = Loss
