= Little Eye =

Little Eye can refer to:

- Little Eye (band), a Scottish pop/rock band
- Little Eye, a small British island located next to Hilbre Island

== See also ==
- I spy, a guessing game involving the phrase, "I spy with my little eye..."
- "Little Eyes", a folk song
