= Pádraig Smith =

Pádraig Smith (born November 1, 1978) is an Irish football executive who is currently the president of the Colorado Rapids.

== Early life ==
Smith grew up in Mornington, Ireland as the eldest of 6 siblings. In his youth he played many sports however, he left sporting behind to pursue a business degree at Dublin City University.

== Career ==
After College Smith worked at EY for 5 years. Then he joined the Football Association of Ireland in 2007 as an internal compliance officer who helped implement a league wide salary cap, with Ireland becoming the first country in Europe to do so. Smith later served as the FAI head of finance from 2010-2011. Smith would then join UEFA as a financial analysis manager until 2014.

== Colorado Rapids ==
In 2015 Smith would join the Rapids as sporting director and on April 13, 2023 he would be promoted to club president. During his tenure at the club Smith has also held the position of executive vice president, and general manager.
