= Matt Crawford =

American soccer midfielder

Personal information
- Full name: Matt Crawford
- Date of birth: August 20, 1980 (age 46)
- Place of birth: Durham, NC, United States
- Height: 5 ft 10 in (1.78 m)
- Position: Midfielder

Youth career
- 1999–02: North Carolina

Senior career*
Years	Team	Apps	(Gls)
2003–2007	Colorado Rapids	52	(2)
- * Club domestic league appearances and goals as of 2 December 2006 ‡ National team caps and goals as of 2 December 2006

Matthew David Crawford (born August 20, 1980, in Durham, North Carolina) is an American soccer midfielder who last played for the Colorado Rapids of Major League Soccer.

He played high school soccer at Durham Academy in Durham, North Carolina and helped earn them state titles in 1995 and 1996.

Crawford played college soccer at the University of North Carolina from 1999 to 2002, leading the Heels to a national title in 2001 including an assist in the title game. He finished his career at UNC with 12 goals and 35 assists in 89 games, 81 of them starts.

Upon graduating, Crawford was drafted 38th overall in the 2003 MLS SuperDraft by the Rapids. Crawford surprised by earning a place on the team, and played extensively as a reserve defender, appearing in 16 games, 8 of them starts, and adding one assist. In 2004, Crawford cemented a starting role in the Rapids midfield, although he still played occasionally in defense. He played in all 30 Rapids games that year, starting 28, and adding one goal and four assists.
