= Justin Hughes (soccer) =

American soccer player (born 1985)

Personal information
- Full name: Justin Hughes
- Date of birth: April 23, 1985 (age 41)
- Place of birth: Wake Forest, North Carolina, U.S.
- Height: 6 ft 1 in (1.85 m)
- Position: Goalkeeper

Youth career
- 2003–2006: North Carolina Tar Heels

Senior career*
Years	Team	Apps	(Gls)
2006	Raleigh Elite	6	(0)
2007–2008	Colorado Rapids	0	(0)
2009	Real Maryland Monarchs	7	(0)

International career
2006	United States U-23	2	(0)

Managerial career
- 2010–2011: Elon Phoenix (Assistant coach)
- 2010–2011: Elon Phoenix (Women's Head coach)
- 2011–2016: Creighton Bluejays (Assistant coach)
- * Club domestic league appearances and goals

Justin Hughes (born April 23, 1985) is an American former soccer player, who currently works as an Investment Advisor with Renaissance Financial in Omaha, Nebraska.

== Career ==
=== College and amateur ===
Hughes was born in Wake Forest, North Carolina. He attended Wakefield High School, where he was an NSCAA adidas All-American, played club soccer for Raleigh CASL Elite, and played college soccer at the University of North Carolina Chapel Hill. At UNC he was named to the All-ACC Academic Team as a junior in 2005.

During his college years Hughes also played with Raleigh Elite in the USL Premier Development League.

=== Professional ===
Hughes was drafted in the third round (36th overall) of the 2007 MLS SuperDraft by the Colorado Rapids. He played for the Rapids in the MLS Reserve Division, but never made a first team appearance, and after suffering a season-ending shoulder injury in 2008, was released at the end of the year.

Hughes signed for the Real Maryland Monarchs in the USL Second Division in 2009, and made his professional debut on June 6, 2009, in a 2–0 loss to the Western Mass Pioneers. He retired August 2009 by Real Maryland Monarchs of the USL Second Division.

=== International ===
Hughes played with the U.S. Under-20 National Team at the 2005 FIFA World Youth Championship in the Netherlands, and has made two appearances for the United States U-23 national team in 2006.

== Coaching career ==
In June 2010 was named as the Assistant Coach of Darren Powell by the Elon University and worked besides as the Women's Soccer Head coach of the Elon Phoenix. He worked as coach by the Elon Phoenix, until June 2011 and was than transferred as Men Soccer Assistant coach to Creighton Bluejays. Hughes spent 5 seasons as an assistant coach with Creighton before deciding to leave the game and focus his career in financial investments beginning in August 2016.
