= 2008 Colorado Rapids season =

Colorado Rapids
2008 season
- Owner: Stan Kroenke
- Coach: Gary Smith
- Major League Soccer: 4th in Western Conference; 9th Overall
- MLS Cup Playoffs: Did not qualify
- U.S. Open Cup: Did not qualify
- Rocky Mountain Cup: Lost
- Average home league attendance: 13,659
- Biggest win: COL 4–0 LA (3/29); COL 4–0 RBNY (7/4)
- Biggest defeat: DC 3–0 COL (8/23)
Home colors	Away colors	Third colors

The 2008 Colorado Rapids season was the thirteenth season of the team's existence. Colorado began their season with 4–0 victory over the Los Angeles Galaxy and ended a 1–1 draw against Real Salt Lake. They finished 4th in the Western Conference and 9th overall, 1 point behind the New York Red Bulls for the final Wild Card Playoff spot.

In the U.S. Open Cup Qualifying, Colorado defeated the Los Angeles Galaxy 1–0 before losing in Kansas City in a penalty shootout.

== Results by round ==
Round	1	2	3	4	5	6	7	8	9	10	11	12	13	14	15	16	17	18	19	20	21	22	23	24	25	26	27	28	29	30
Stadium	H	A	A	H	A	H	A	H	H	H	A	A	H	A	H	A	A	H	H	H	A	A	A	H	H	A	H	A	A	H
Result	W	L	W	L	L	W	L	W	L	W	L	L	D	L	W	D	D	L	L	W	L	L	W	W	D	W	L	L	W	D

Source: Colorado Rapids
A = Away; H = Home; W = Win; D = Draw; L = Loss

== Friendly ==
August 3, 2008	Colorado Rapids	1–2	Everton F.C.	Dick's Sporting Goods Park, Commerce City
8:00pm EST	Conor Casey 48'	Report	Mikel Arteta 6'; Leon Osman 87'	Attendance: 10,278; Referee: Jeremy Vehar

== MLS ==
=== March ===
March 29, 2008	Colorado Rapids	4–0	Los Angeles Galaxy	Commerce City, Colorado United States
	Cooke 10' Gomez 59'; Cummings 66' Clark 80'			Stadium: Dick's Sporting Goods Park; Attendance: 18,713

=== April ===
April 5, 2008	Kansas City Wizards	3–2	Colorado Rapids	Kansas City, Kansas United States
	Conrad 52', 54'; Sealy 87'		Burciga Jr. 57'; DiRaimondo 68'	Stadium: CommunityAmerica Ballpark; Attendance: 8,731

April 12, 2008	New England Revolution	0–1	Colorado Rapids	Foxborough, Massachusetts United States
			LaBrocca 68'	Stadium: Gillette Stadium; Attendance: 8,309

April 19, 2008	Colorado Rapids	0–2	San Jose Earthquakes	Commerce City, Colorado United States
			O'Brien 43'; Kamara 61'	Stadium: Dick's Sporting Goods Park; Attendance: 14,919

April 26, 2008	Chicago Fire	2–1	Colorado Rapids	Bridgeview, Illinois United States
	Thorrington 53', 84'		McManus 86'	Stadium: Toyota Park; Attendance: 14,251

=== May ===
May 4, 2008	Colorado Rapids	2–0	D.C. United	Commerce City, Colorado United States
	Peterson 53'; Erpen 72'			Stadium: Dick's Sporting Goods Park; Attendance: 13,115

May 10, 2008	Houston Dynamo	2–1	Colorado Rapids	Houston, Texas United States
	Ching 43'; De Rosario 87'		Cummings 68'	Stadium: Robertson Stadium; Attendance: 15,024

May 15, 2008	Colorado Rapids	2–0	Real Salt Lake	Commerce City, Colorado United States
	Cummings 65'; Gomez 83'			Stadium: Dick's Sporting Goods Park; Attendance: 11,414

May 24, 2008	Colorado Rapids	1–2	Chivas USA	Commerce City, Colorado United States
	McManus 80'		Marsch 45'; Flores 79'	Stadium: Dick's Sporting Goods Park; Attendance: 14,619

=== June ===
June 1, 2008	Colorado Rapids	2–1	FC Dallas	Commerce City, Colorado United States
	Casey 7'; McManus 72'		Oduro 44'	Stadium: Dick's Sporting Goods Park; Attendance: 12,120

June 7, 2008	Los Angeles Galaxy	3–2	Colorado Rapids	Carson, California United States
	Pires 4' Buddle 32' Allen 50'		Clark 73'; Gomez 82'	Stadium: The Home Depot Center; Attendance: 25,129

June 14, 2008	Toronto FC	3–1	Colorado Rapids	Toronto, Ontario Canada
	Dichio 37'; Ricketts 58', 67'		Gomez 80'	Stadium: BMO Field; Attendance: 20,135

June 21, 2008	Colorado Rapids	0–0	Houston Dynamo	Commerce City, Colorado United States
				Stadium: Dick's Sporting Goods Park; Attendance: 13,220

June 28, 2008	Columbus Crew	2–1	Colorado Rapids	Columbus, Ohio United States
	B. Schelotto 53'; Ekpo 70'		LaBrocca 60'	Stadium: Columbus Crew Stadium; Attendance: 12,254

=== July ===
July 4, 2008	Colorado Rapids	4–0	New York Red Bulls	Commerce City, Colorado United States
	McManus 24' Ballouchy 37'; Clark 49' Cummings 68'			Stadium: Dick's Sporting Goods Park; Attendance: 18,776

July 12, 2008	San Jose Earthquakes	1–1	Colorado Rapids	Santa Clara, California United States
	Johnson 62'		Casey 69'	Stadium: Buck Shaw Stadium; Attendance: 9,107

July 19, 2008	FC Dallas	2–2	Colorado Rapids	Frisco, Texas United States
	Cooper 49'; Toja 64'		Gomez 5'; Casey 67'	Stadium: Pizza Hut Park; Attendance: 12,289

July 27, 2008	Colorado Rapids	0–2	Columbus Crew	Commerce City, Colorado United States
			Lenhart 21'; Garey 75'	Stadium: Dick's Sporting Goods Park; Attendance: 10,647

=== August ===
August 9, 2008	Colorado Rapids	0–1	Toronto FC	Commerce City, Colorado United States
			Barrett 44'	Stadium: Dick's Sporting Goods Park; Attendance: 11,752

August 16, 2008	Colorado Rapids	2–1	Kansas City Wizards	Commerce City, Colorado United States
	Casey 11', 47'		Harrington 44'	Stadium: Dick's Sporting Goods Park; Attendance: 10,609

August 23, 2008	D.C. United	3–0	Colorado Rapids	Washington, D.C. United States
	Vide 45' Quaranta 82' Kirk 87'			Stadium: RFK Stadium; Attendance: 17,283

August 29, 2008	Real Salt Lake	2–0	Colorado Rapids	Salt Lake City, Utah United States
	Espindola 23', 59'			Stadium: Rice-Eccles Stadium; Attendance: 15,257

=== September ===
September 4, 2008	FC Dallas	0–1	Colorado Rapids	Frisco, Texas United States
			Petke 60'	Stadium: Pizza Hut Park; Attendance: 7,140

September 14, 2008	Colorado Rapids	2–0	Chicago Fire	Commerce City, Colorado United States
	31' (o.g.) Cummings 38'			Stadium: Dick's Sporting Goods Park; Attendance: 14,214

September 20, 2008	Colorado Rapids	1–1	New England Revolution	Commerce City, Colorado United States
	Clark 42'		Mansally 50'	Stadium: Dick's Sporting Goods Park; Attendance: 12.223

September 27, 2008	New York Red Bulls	4–5	Colorado Rapids	East Rutherford, New Jersey United States
	Magee 5' Angel 34'; Richards 40' Mbuta 74'		Cummings 3' Casey 11', 45', 90' Petke 43'	Stadium: Giants Stadium; Attendance: 17,795

=== October ===
October 4, 2008	Colorado Rapids	1–3	Houston Dynamo	Commerce City, Colorado United States
	Casey 7'		Ching 2', 9'; Clark 19'	Stadium: Dick's Sporting Goods Park; Attendance: 12,496

October 12, 2008	Los Angeles Galaxy	3–2	Colorado Rapids	Carson, California United States
	Buddle 36' 70' (o.g.) McDonald 80'		Gibbs 43'; McManus 88'	Stadium: The Home Depot Center; Attendance: 27,000

October 19, 2008	Chivas USA	1–2	Colorado Rapids	Carson, California United States
	Bornstein 72'		Clark 67'; Casey 85'	Stadium: The Home Depot Center; Attendance: 13,427

October 25, 2008	Colorado Rapids	1–1	Real Salt Lake	Commerce City, Colorado United States
	Casey 19'		Movsisyan 90'	Stadium: Dick's Sporting Goods Park; Attendance: 16,047

== U.S. Open Cup Qualifying ==
May 27, 2008	Los Angeles Galaxy	0–1	Colorado Rapids	Carson, California United States
				Stadium: The Home Depot Center

June 4, 2008	Kansas City Wizards	2–2 (5–3 p)	Colorado Rapids	Kansas City, Kansas United States
				Stadium: CommunityAmerica Ballpark

== Standings ==
Conference

Pos	Team	Pld	W	L	T	GF	GA	GD	Pts	Qualification
1	Houston Dynamo	30	13	5	12	45	32	+13	51	MLS Cup Playoffs
2	Chivas USA	30	12	11	7	40	41	−1	43	MLS Cup Playoffs
3	Real Salt Lake	30	10	10	10	40	39	+1	40	MLS Cup Playoffs
4	Colorado Rapids	30	11	14	5	44	45	−1	38	
5	FC Dallas	30	8	10	12	45	41	+4	36	
6	LA Galaxy	30	8	13	9	55	62	−7	33	
7	San Jose Earthquakes	30	8	13	9	32	38	−6	33	

Source: MLS

Overall

Pos	Team	Pld	W	L	T	GF	GA	GD	Pts	Qualification
1	Columbus Crew (C, S)	30	17	7	6	50	36	+14	57	CONCACAF Champions League
2	Houston Dynamo	30	13	5	12	45	32	+13	51	CONCACAF Champions League
3	Chicago Fire	30	13	10	7	44	33	+11	46	North American SuperLiga
4	Chivas USA	30	12	11	7	40	41	−1	43	North American SuperLiga
5	New England Revolution	30	12	11	7	40	43	−3	43	North American SuperLiga
6	Kansas City Wizards	30	11	10	9	37	39	−2	42	North American SuperLiga
7	Real Salt Lake	30	10	10	10	40	39	+1	40	
8	New York Red Bulls	30	10	11	9	42	48	−6	39	CONCACAF Champions League
9	Colorado Rapids	30	11	14	5	44	45	−1	38	
10	D.C. United	30	11	15	4	43	51	−8	37	CONCACAF Champions League
11	FC Dallas	30	8	10	12	45	41	+4	36	
12	Toronto FC	30	9	13	8	34	43	−9	35	CONCACAF Champions League (Note: As winners of the 2009 Canadian Championship)
13	LA Galaxy	30	8	13	9	55	62	−7	33	
14	San Jose Earthquakes	30	8	13	9	32	38	−6	33	

Source: MLS
Rules for classification: 1) points; 2) head-to-head record; 3) goal difference; 4) number of goals scored
(C) Champions; (S) Supporters' Shield
