= 2011 Colorado Rapids season =

Colorado Rapids
2011 season
- Owner: Stan Kroenke
- Coach: Gary Smith
- Major League Soccer: 6th
- CONCACAF Champions League: Group stage
- U.S. Open Cup: Qualification Round 2
- MLS Cup: Conference semi-finals
- Rocky Mountain Cup: Runners-up
- Average home league attendance: 14,140
- Biggest win: COL 4-1 DC (4/3)
- Biggest defeat: DAL 3-0 COL (4/8)
Home colors	Away colors

The 2011 Colorado Rapids season was the club's seventeenth year of existence, as well as its sixteenth season in Major League Soccer, and its sixteenth consecutive season in the top-flight of American soccer.

The Rapids will be entered the season as the defending MLS Cup champions.

== Background ==
The Colorado Rapids are coming off a season, where the club's success was highlighted by winning the MLS Cup, their first postseason title in the process. It was the first time in 17 years that a soccer club based in Colorado won any league/cup title, the last being the Colorado Foxes of the APSL.

In MLS regular season play, the Rapids finished in 7th place overall. The club was eliminated during the top-tier qualification propers of U.S. Open Cup, losing 3–0 to Red Bull New York in the fifth round play-in match.

In the Rocky Mountain Cup derby series against cross-mountain rivals, Real Salt Lake, the clubs tied one another 3–3 in season play. Because of this, the Cup was retained by Salt Lake for the third-consecutive year.

== Club ==
=== Roster ===
As of September 11, 2011.

Note: Flags indicate national team as defined under FIFA eligibility rules; some limited exceptions apply. Players may hold more than one non-FIFA nationality.

No.	Pos.	Nation	Player
2	DF	IRL	Danny Earls
3	DF	USA	Drew Moor
4	MF	USA	Jeff Larentowicz
5	MF	CMR	Joseph Nane
6	DF	USA	Anthony Wallace
7	MF	CAN	Josh Janniere
8	DF	USA	Eddie Ababio
9	FW	USA	Conor Casey
10	FW	SEN	Macoumba Kandji
11	MF	USA	Brian Mullan
12	FW	USA	Quincy Amarikwa
13	MF	USA	Steven Emory
14	FW	JAM	Omar Cummings
15	MF	USA	Wells Thompson
16	MF	USA	Ross LaBauex

No.	Pos.	Nation	Player
17	GK	USA	Ian Joyce
18	GK	USA	Matt Pickens
19	FW	USA	Andre Akpan
20	MF	SCO	Jamie Smith
21	FW	IRL	Caleb Folan
22	DF	USA	Marvell Wynne
23	MF	GAM	Sanna Nyassi
25	MF	USA	Pablo Mastroeni (captain)
26	DF	USA	Michael Holody
27	MF	JPN	Kosuke Kimura
28	MF	USA	Davy Armstrong
29	DF	USA	Scott Palguta
31	GK	HAI	Steward Ceus
34	DF	JAM	Tyrone Marshall
-	DF	GLP	Miguel Comminges

=== Team management ===
Position	Name
Managing Director	(United States) Jeff Plush
Technical director	(United States) Paul Bravo
Head coach	(England) Gary Smith
Assistant coaches	(England) Steve Guppy (England) Brett Jacobs
Goalkeeper coach	(United States) David Kramer
Fitness coach	(Scotland) John Ireland
Team Administrator	(Czech Republic) Erik Carlson
Head Athletic Trainer	(United States) Jaime Rojas
Assistant Athletic Trainer	(United States) Craig Magri
Equipment Manager	(Guatemala) Carlos Garcia

== Player movement ==
=== Transfers ===
==== In ====
Date	Player	Position	Previous club	Fee/notes	Ref
November 22, 2010	(United States) Peter Vagenas	MF	(United States) Seattle Sounders FC	Acquired in exchange for Julien Baudet and Danny Earls; subsequently released	
November 24, 2010	(The Gambia) Sanna Nyassi	MF	(Canada) Vancouver Whitecaps	Acquired in exchange for an international roster slot	
November 24, 2010	(United States) Anthony Wallace	DF	(United States) Portland Timbers	Acquired for allocation money	
December 3, 2010	(Cameroon) Joseph Nane	MF	(Canada) Toronto	Acquired for 3rd round 2012 SuperDraft pick	
December 15, 2010	(Jamaica) Tyrone Marshall	DF	(United States) Seattle Sounders FC	Re-Entry Draft	
March 1, 2011	(United States) Steven Emory	MF	(United States) Metro State College	Free	
March 1, 2011	(United States) Michael Holody	DF	Unattached	Free	
March 16, 2011	(Republic of Ireland) Caleb Folan	FW	(England) Hull City	Undisclosed	
March 30, 2011	(Republic of Ireland) Danny Earls	DF	(United States) Seattle Sounders FC	Free	
March 30, 2011	(Canada) Josh Janniere	MF	(Canada) Toronto FC	Acquired for 3rd round 2013 Supplemental Draft pick	
April 14, 2011	(United States) Eddie Ababio	DF	(United States) University of North Carolina	SuperDraft, Round 1 pick	
September 9, 2011	(Guadeloupe) Miguel Comminges	DF	(England) Southend United	Free	

==== Out ====
Date	Player	Position	Destination club	Fee/notes	Ref
November 22, 2010	(France) Julien Baudet	DF	(United States) Seattle Sounders FC	Traded for Peter Vagenas	
November 22, 2010	(Republic of Ireland) Danny Earls	DF	(United States) Seattle Sounders FC	Traded for Peter Vagenas	
November 24, 2010	(United States) Anthony Wallace	DF	(United States) Portland Timbers	Expansion Draft, subsequently reacquired	
November 24, 2010	(United States) Ross Schunk	FW		Waived	
December 8, 2010	(United States) Peter Vagenas	MF	(Canada) Vancouver Whitecaps FC	Option declined, free transfer	
December 8, 2010	(Argentina) Claudio López	FW		Option declined	
December 8, 2010	(United States) Ciaran O'Brien	MF	(United States) Atlanta Silverbacks	Option declined, free transfer	

== Standings ==
=== Conference standings ===
Pos	Team	Pld	W	L	T	GF	GA	GD	Pts	Qualification
1	LA Galaxy	34	19	5	10	48	28	+20	67	Qualification for the conference semifinals
2	Seattle Sounders FC	34	18	7	9	56	37	+19	63	Qualification for the conference semifinals
3	Real Salt Lake	34	15	11	8	44	36	+8	53	Qualification for the conference semifinals
4	FC Dallas	34	15	12	7	42	39	+3	52	Qualification for the play-in round
5	Colorado Rapids	34	12	9	13	46	42	+4	49	Qualification for the play-in round
6	Portland Timbers	34	11	14	9	40	48	−8	42	
7	San Jose Earthquakes	34	8	12	14	40	45	−5	38	
8	Chivas USA	34	8	14	12	41	43	−2	36	
9	Vancouver Whitecaps FC	34	6	18	10	35	55	−20	28	

Source: MLS

=== Overall standings ===
Pos	Team	Pld	W	L	T	GF	GA	GD	Pts	
1	LA Galaxy (S, C)	34	19	5	10	48	28	+20	67	Qualification for the 2012–13 CONCACAF Champions League group stage
2	Seattle Sounders FC (U)	34	18	7	9	56	37	+19	63	Qualification for the 2012–13 CONCACAF Champions League group stage
3	Real Salt Lake	34	15	11	8	44	36	+8	53	Qualification for the 2012–13 CONCACAF Champions League group stage
4	FC Dallas	34	15	12	7	42	39	+3	52	
5	Sporting Kansas City	34	13	9	12	50	40	+10	51	
6	Houston Dynamo	34	12	9	13	45	41	+4	49	Qualification for the 2012–13 CONCACAF Champions League group stage
7	Colorado Rapids	34	12	9	13	44	41	+3	49	
8	Philadelphia Union	34	11	8	15	44	36	+8	48	
9	Columbus Crew	34	13	13	8	43	44	−1	47	
10	New York Red Bulls	34	10	8	16	50	44	+6	46	
11	Chicago Fire	34	9	9	16	46	45	+1	43	
12	Portland Timbers	34	11	14	9	40	48	−8	42	
13	D.C. United	34	9	13	12	49	52	−3	39	
14	San Jose Earthquakes	34	8	12	14	40	45	−5	38	
15	Chivas USA	34	8	14	12	41	43	−2	36	
16	Toronto FC (V)	34	6	13	15	36	59	−23	33	Qualification for the 2011–12 CONCACAF Champions League preliminary round
17	New England Revolution	34	5	16	13	38	58	−20	28	
18	Vancouver Whitecaps FC	34	6	18	10	35	55	−20	28	

Source: MLS
Rules for classification: 1) points; 2) head-to-head record; 3) goal difference; 4) number of goals scored
(C) MLS Cup champions; (S) Supporters' Shield winners; (U) U.S. Open Cup winners; (V) Canadian Championship winners

=== Results summary ===
Overall								Home						Away					
Pld	Pts	W	L	T	GF	GA	GD	W	L	T	GF	GA	GD	W	L	T	GF	GA	GD
34	49	12	9	13	44	41	+3	6	2	9	25	16	+9	6	7	4	19	25	−6

Last updated: November 13, 2011
Source: MLSSoccer.com
Pld = Matches played; Pts = Points; W = Matches won; T = Matches tied; L = Matches lost; GF = Goals for; GA = Goals against; GD = Goal difference

=== Results by round ===
Round	1	2	3	4	5	6	7	8	9	10	11	12	13	14	15	16	17	18	19	20	21	22	23	24	25	26	27	28	29	30	31	32	33	34
Stadium	H	A	H	A	A	H	H	A	A	A	H	A	H	H	A	H	A	H	A	H	A	H	H	A	H	A	H	A	A	A	H	H	H	A
Result	W	W	W	L	L	L	T	W	T	T	T	T	T	T	W	L	L	T	T	W	L	W	T	W	W	W	T	L	L	L	T	W	T	W
Position	2	2	1	2	3	5	7	5	4	7	7	7	7	8	6	8	8	8	8	8	9	8												5

Updated to match(es) played on August 13, 2011. Source: MLS Results and League table
A = Away; H = Home; W = Win; L = Loss; T = Tie

== Matches ==
=== Preseason ===
February 12, 2011 Preseason 1	Kansas City	0–0	Colorado

February 14, 2011 Preseason 2	Columbus	0–2	Colorado

February 16, 2011 Preseason 3	Los Angeles	2–4	Colorado

March 4, 2011 Preseason 4	San Jose	1–0	Colorado
19:30

March 9, 2011 Community Shield	Seattle Sounders FC	3–1	Colorado Rapids	Qwest Field, Seattle
20:00 MDT	González (yellow card) 57'; Hurtado 60'; Montero 67' 78'; Friberg (yellow card) 86'	Report	63' (pen.) Larentowicz	Attendance: 7,355; Referee: Yader Reyes

March 12, 2011 Preseason 6	Vancouver	0–1	Colorado

=== Major League Soccer ===
==== Regular season ====
All times Mountain Daylight Time.

March 19, 2011 Match 1	Colorado	3–1	Portland	Dick's Sporting Goods Park, Commerce City
20:00	Larentowicz 8'; Cummings 29'; Smith 30'; Casey (yellow card) 39'	Report	81' Cooper	Attendance: 17,139; Referee: Ricardo Salazar

March 26, 2011 Match 2	Chivas USA	0–1	Colorado	The Home Depot Center, Carson
20:30	Zemanski (yellow card) 72'; Braun (yellow card) 78'	Report	(yellow card) 29' Mullan; 31' Amarikwa; (yellow card) 79' Pickens; (yellow card) 81' Wallace; (yellow card) 89' Casey; (yellow card) 96+' Mastroeni	Attendance: 13,027; Referee: Terry Vaughn

April 3, 2011 Match 3	Colorado	4–1	D.C. United	Dick's Sporting Goods Park, Commerce City
17:00	Casey (yellow card) 15'; Folan 39'; Smith 71'; Folan 81'; Cummings 92+'	Report	(yellow card) 41' McCarty; 70' Quaranta; (yellow card) 83' Burch	Attendance: 9,857; Referee: Elias Bazakos

April 8, 2011 Match 4	Dallas	3–0	Colorado	Pizza Hut Park, Frisco
19:30	Jacobson (yellow card) 13'; Ihemelu 26'; Ferreira 40' 46'; Hernández (yellow card) 90'	Report	(yellow card) 19' Nyassi; (yellow card) 33' Folan; (yellow card) 52' Wallace; (yellow card) 81' Cummings; (yellow card) 84' Moor	Attendance: 12,261; Referee: Paul Ward

April 13, 2011 Match 5	Salt Lake	1–0	Colorado	Rio Tinto Stadium, Sandy
19:30	Morales (yellow card) 32'; Espíndola 93+'	Report	(yellow card) 59' Marshall; (yellow card) 82' Wynne	Attendance: 15,513; Referee: Baldomero Toledo

April 22, 2011 Match 6	Colorado	0–1	Seattle	Dick's Sporting Goods Park, Commerce City
19:30		Report	Montero 19'	Attendance: 14,185; Referee: Silviu Petrescu

April 30, 2011 Match 7	Colorado	1–1	Chicago	Dick's Sporting Goods Park, Commerce City
19:00	Akpan 50'	Report	Pappa 43'	Attendance: 11,789; Referee: Jorge Gonzalez

May 4, 2011 Match 8	Houston	1–2	Colorado	Robertson Stadium, Houston
18:30	Clark 71'	Report	Smith 73'; Palguta 84'	Attendance: 13,206; Referee: Terry Vaughn

May 7, 2011 Match 9	New England	0–0	Colorado	Gillette Stadium, Foxborough
17:30		Report		Attendance: 11,755; Referee: David Gantar

May 14, 2011 Match 10	D.C. United	1–1	Colorado	Washington, D.C.
17:30 MDT	Davies (substituted off) Quaranta (substituted on) 34'; Wolff (substituted off) Ngwenya (substituted on) 46'; Pontius 62' (pen.); Simms (substituted off) Fred (substituted on) 81'	Report	23' (yellow card) 46' Moor; (substituted off) 67' Amarikwa (substituted on) Casey; (substituted off) 75' Akpan (substituted on) Nyassi; (yellow card) 92+' Pickens; (substituted off) 93+' Thompson (substituted on) LaBauex	Stadium: RFK Stadium; Attendance: 12,500; Referee: Terry Vaughn (Iowa)

May 22, 2011 Match 11	Colorado	0–0	Toronto	Dick's Sporting Goods Park, Commerce City
17:00		Report		Attendance: 13,598; Referee: Abiodun Okulaja

May 25, 2011 Match 12	New York	2–2	Colorado	Red Bull Arena, Harrison
18:00	Henry 29'; Rodgers 33'	Report	Larentowicz 27', 32'	Attendance: 18,081; Referee: Jorge Gonzalez

May 28, 2011 Match 13	Colorado	1–1	Kansas City	Dick's Sporting Goods Park, Commerce City
19:00	Casey 13'	Report	Smith 75'	Attendance: 16,439; Referee: Hilario Grajeda

June 4, 2011 Match 14	Colorado	1–1	Philadelphia	Dick's Sporting Goods Park, Commerce City
19:00	Casey 63'	Report	Mwanga 66'	Attendance: 12,779; Referee: Jasen Anno

June 11, 2011 Match 15	Portland	0–1	Colorado	Jeld-Wen Field, Portland
20:30		Report	Moor 90+2'	Attendance: 18,627; Referee: Abiodun Okulaja

June 18, 2011 Match 16	Colorado	1–3	Los Angeles	Dick's Sporting Goods Park, Commerce City
19:00	Casey 64'	Report	Moor 25' (o.g.); Juninho 42'; Barrett 80'	Attendance: 18,277; Referee: Hilario Grajeda

June 26, 2011 Match 17	Columbus	4–1	Colorado	Columbus Crew Stadium, Columbus
18:00	Gaven 12'; Mendoza 18', 48'; Heinemann 57'	Report	Casey 5'	Attendance: 10,771; Referee: Andrew Chapin

July 3, 2011 Match 18	Colorado	0–0	Houston	Dick's Sporting Goods Park, Commerce City
19:00		Report		Attendance: 18,203; Referee: Baldomero Toledo

July 6, 2011 Match 19	Kansas City	1–1	Colorado	Livestrong Sporting Park, Kansas City, KS
18:30	Zusi 62'	Report	Casey 32'	Attendance: 15,209; Referee: Niko Bratsis

July 9, 2011 Match 20	Colorado	2–1	Vancouver	Dick's Sporting Goods Park, Commerce City
19:00	Casey 25'; Palguta 68'	Report	Sanvezzo 77'	Attendance: 13,058; Referee: Alex Prus

July 16, 2011 Match 21	Seattle	4–3	Colorado	Qwest Field, Seattle
14:00	Fernandez 7'; Levesque 48'; Montero 82'; Rosales 84'	Report	Thompson 1'; Larentowicz 42'; Folan 89'	Attendance: 36,424; Referee: Edvin Jurisevic

July 20, 2011 Match 22	Colorado	4–1	New York	Dick's Sporting Goods Park, Commerce City
19:30	Nyassi 2', 30', 61'; Thompson 26'	Report	Henry 67'	Attendance: 15,227; Referee: Silviu Petrescu

July 23, 2011 Match 23	Colorado	2–2	New England	Dick's Sporting Goods Park, Commerce City
19:00	Folan 65'; Kimura 82'	Report	Feilhaber 25'; Joseph 90'	Attendance: 12,273; Referee: Geoff Gamble

July 29, 2011 Match 24	Philadelphia	1–2	Colorado	PPL Park, Chester
17:30	Torres 90+2'	Report	Mastroeni 35'; Nyassi 45'	Attendance: 18,770; Referee: Jorge Gonzalez

August 5, 2011 Match 25	Colorado	2–0	Columbus	Dick's Sporting Goods Park, Commerce City
19:30	Mullan 55'; Cummings 79'	Report		Attendance: 14,503; Referee: Alex Prus

August 13, 2011 Match 26	San Jose	1–2	Colorado	Buck Shaw Stadium, Santa Clara
20:30	Stephenson (yellow card) 15'; Gjertsen 22'; Wondolowski (yellow card) 36'; Cronin (red card) 50'	Report	Thompson (yellow card) 25'; Folan 39'; Larentowicz (yellow card) 55'; Larentowicz 72'; Moor (yellow card) 79'; Folan (yellow card) 81'	Attendance: 10,525; Referee: Paul Ward

August 20, 2011 Match 27	Colorado	2–2	Chivas USA	Dick's Sporting Goods Park, Commerce City
19:00	Folan 13'; Larentowicz 69'	Report	Umaña (yellow card) 19'; Ángel 36'; Courtois 86'	Attendance: 16,852; Referee: Elias Bazakos

August 27, 2011 Match 28	Chicago	2–0	Colorado	Toyota Park (Bridgeview), Bridgeview
18:30	Oduro 17'; Gibbs 36'; Segares (yellow card) 61'	Report	Moor (yellow card) 55'; Nyassi (yellow card) 67'; Mullan (yellow card) 74'	Attendance: 15,211; Referee: Juan Guzman

September 9, 2011 Match 29	Los Angeles	1–0	Colorado	Home Depot Center, Carson
21:00	Donovan 36'	Report	Mullan (yellow card) 74'	Attendance: 20,068; Referee: Kevin Stott

September 17, 2011 Match 30	Toronto FC	2–1	Colorado	BMO Field, Toronto
11:30	de Guzman (yellow card) 38'; Koevermans 52'; Koevermans 60'	Report	Nyassi (yellow card) 67'; Nyassi 70'	Attendance: 20,318; Referee: Mark Kadlecik

September 24, 2011 Match 31	Colorado	1–1	San Jose	Dick's Sporting Goods Park, Commerce City
19:00	Moor (yellow card) 53'; Folan (yellow card) 63'; Moor 71'	Report	Wondolowski 19'; Dawkins (yellow card) 43'; Ring (yellow card) 52'; Beitashour (yellow card) 76'	Attendance: 17,877; Referee: Jorge Gonzalez

October 1, 2011 Match 32	Colorado	1–0	FC Dallas	Dick's Sporting Goods Park, Commerce City
19:00	Moor 25'	Report		Attendance: 13,920; Referee: Silviu Petrescu

October 14, 2011 Match 33	Colorado	0–0	Salt Lake	Dick's Sporting Goods Park, Commerce City
20:30		Report		Attendance: 16,272; Referee: Ricardo Salazar

October 22, 2011 Match 34	Vancouver	1–2	Colorado	BC Place, Vancouver
17:00	Rochat 49'		Larentowicz (yellow card) 10' (goal) 59' Marshall (yellow card) 77' Thompson 84'	Attendance: 21,000; Referee: Baldomero Toledo

Last updated: October 22, 2011
Source: Colorado Rapids

==== MLS Cup Playoffs ====
October 27, 2011 Wildcard	Colorado	1–0	Columbus	Dick's Sporting Goods Park, Commerce City
20:00 MDT	Cummings 44'	Report		Attendance: 7,803; Referee: Jorge Gonzalez

October 30, 2011 Conf. semi-finals	Colorado	0–2	Kansas City	Dick's Sporting Goods Park, Commerce City
17:30 MDT	Bunbury (yellow card) 45+2' (goal) 49' 59' (pen.)	Report	Marshall (red card) 57'; Nyassi (yellow card) 63'	Attendance: 8,601; Referee: Baldomero Toledo

November 2, 2011 Conf. semi-finals	Kansas City	2–0 (4–0 agg.)	Colorado	Kansas City, Kansas
18:30 MDT	Collin 28'; Espinoza (yellow card) 35'; Cesar (yellow card) 45+3'; Arnaud (yellow card) 65'; Sapong 76'	Report	Nane (yellow card) 27'; Comminges (yellow card) 55'; Mullan (yellow card) 75'; Nyassi (yellow card) 90+3'	Stadium: Livestrong Sporting Park; Attendance: 18,565; Referee: Kevin Stott

Last updated: November 2, 2011
Source: Colorado Rapids

=== CONCACAF Champions League ===
By winning the 2010 MLS Cup final, Colorado Rapids have qualified directly into Group stage for the 2011-12 edition of the CONCACAF Champions League. It will be Colorado's debut in the Champions League and their first time participating in a CONCACAF club competition since 1997.

Group stage – Group B

Team	Pld	W	D	L	GF	GA	GD	Pts
(Mexico) Santos Laguna	6	4	1	1	16	6	+10	13
(El Salvador) Isidro Metapán	6	3	0	3	10	15	−5	9
(United States) Colorado Rapids	6	2	1	3	9	12	−3	7
(Honduras) Real España	6	1	2	3	9	11	−2	5

All times Mountain Daylight Time.

August 17, 2011 Match 1	Colorado Rapids (United States)	3–2	(El Salvador) Isidro Metapán	Commerce City, Colorado
20:00	Moor (yellow card) 1'; Nyassi (yellow card) 17'; Kandji 16', 45+'	Report	2' (pen.) (red card) 41' Kardeck; 25' Suárez	Stadium: Dick's Sporting Goods Park; Attendance: 4,165; Referee: Trevor Taylor (Barbados)

August 23, 2011 Match 2	Real España (Honduras)	1–1	(United States) Colorado Rapids	San Pedro Sula, Honduras
17:30	Rodríguez 87'	Report	Larentowicz 45+1'	Stadium: Estadio Francisco Morazán; Attendance: 5,841; Referee: Roberto García (Mexico)

September 13, 2011 Match 3	Colorado Rapids (United States)	1–4	(Mexico) Santos Laguna	Commerce City, Colorado
20:00	Mullan 77'	Report	Ludueña 14'; Peralta 27'; Quintero 64'; Suárez 71'	Stadium: Dick's Sporting Goods Park; Attendance: 9,760; Referee: Roberto Moreno (Panama)

September 21, 2011 Match 4	Colorado Rapids (United States)	1–2	(Honduras) Real España	Commerce City, Colorado
20:00				Stadium: Dick's Sporting Goods Park

September 28, 2011 Match 5	Isidro Metapán (El Salvador)	1–3	(United States) Colorado Rapids	Estadio Jorge Calero Suárez, Metapán
20:00	Pacheco 36'	Report	Ababio 31'; Amarikwa 49'; Cummings 77'	Referee: Raúl Castro (Honduras)

October 19, 2011 Match 6	Santos Laguna (Mexico)	2–0	(United States) Colorado Rapids	Torreón, Mexico
18:00				Stadium: Estadio Corona

Last updated: October 19, 2011
Source: Colorado Rapids

=== U.S. Open Cup ===
March 30, 2011 Qualifying Round 2	Chicago Fire (Illinois)	2–1	Colorado Rapids	Shea Stadium, Peoria, Illinois
17:30 MDT	Puerari 45'; Anibaba 61'	Report	46' Akpan	Attendance: 2,029

Last updated: March 30, 2011
Source: Colorado Rapids

== Miscellany ==
=== Allocation ranking ===
Colorado is in the #12 position in the MLS Allocation Ranking. The allocation ranking is the mechanism used to determine which MLS club has first priority to acquire a U.S. National Team player who signs with MLS after playing abroad, or a former MLS player who returns to the league after having gone to a club abroad for a transfer fee. A ranking can be traded, provided that part of the compensation received in return is another club's ranking.

=== International roster spots ===
Colorado has 7 international roster spots. Each club in Major League Soccer is allocated 8 international roster spots, which can be traded. Colorado dealt a spot to Vancouver on November 24, 2010. Press reports did not indicate if or when this roster spot is to revert to Colorado. The club also traded a spot to New York Red Bulls on September 14, 2010, in the Macoumba Kandji trade. The trade of this spot was not included in the press release and it is not known when this spot reverts to Colorado. The club acquired a spot permanently from Real Salt Lake on June 29, 2005.

There is no limit on the number of international slots on each club's roster. The remaining roster slots must belong to domestic players. For clubs based in the United States, a domestic player is either a U.S. citizen, a permanent resident (green card holder) or the holder of other special status (e.g., refugee or asylum status).

=== Future draft pick trades ===
Future picks acquired: 2013 SuperDraft Round 4 pick acquired from Houston Dynamo.
Future picks traded: 2012 SuperDraft Round 2 pick traded to San Jose Earthquakes; 2012 SuperDraft Round 3 pick traded to Toronto FC; 2012 SuperDraft conditional pick traded to FC Dallas; 2013 Supplemental Draft Round 3 pick traded to Toronto FC.
