= Bornstein =

Bornstein is a German and Ashkenazi surname. It may refer to:

- David Bornstein (author) (born ?), American business writer and journalist
- David Bornstein (politician) (born 1940), Australian politician
- Ernst Israel Bornstein (1922–1978), Polish-born Jewish holocaust survivor
- Harold Bornstein (1947–2021), American gastroenterologist
- Jonathan Bornstein (born 1984), American-Israeli soccer player
- Kate Bornstein (born 1948), American author, playwright, performance artist, and gender theorist
- Marc H. Bornstein (born 1947), American biologist and psychologist
- Murray Bornstein (1917–1995), American neuroscientist, biologist, and educator
- Sam Bornstein (1920–1990), British historian and activist
- Stefan R. Bornstein (born 1961), German physician and academic
- Steve Bornstein (born 1952), American sports television executive
- Thorsten Botz-Bornstein (born 1964), German philosopher

== See also ==
- Neudorf-Bornstein, German municipality
- Landolt–Börnstein, online science and engineering database
- People named Borstein: Alex Borstein; Elena Borstein
