= Colorado Rapids =

Professional soccer club in Denver, Colorado, US

- Nickname: Pids
- Founded: June 6, 1995; 31 years ago
- Stadium: Dick's Sporting Goods Park; Commerce City, Colorado
- Capacity: 18,062 (expandable to 19,680)
- Owner: Kroenke Sports & Entertainment
- President: Pádraig Smith
- Head coach: Matt Wells
- League: Major League Soccer
- 2026: Western Conference: 12th Overall: 21st Playoffs: Did not qualify
- Website: coloradorapids.com
Home colors	Away colors	Third colors

The Colorado Rapids are an American professional soccer club based in the Denver metropolitan area. The Rapids compete in Major League Soccer (MLS) as a member of the Western Conference. Founded in 1995, as part of the Anschutz Corporation (later transferred to its Anschutz Entertainment Group subsidiary), the club is a founding member of MLS, playing their first season in 1996.

The Rapids are owned by the Kroenke Sports & Entertainment, also owners of the Denver Nuggets of the NBA, Colorado Avalanche of the NHL, Colorado Mammoth of the NLL, and other sports teams outside of the state of Colorado.

Colorado won the MLS Cup in 2010, their second MLS Cup appearance after falling short in 1997. They were runners-up of the U.S. Open Cup in 1999, losing to the Rochester Raging Rhinos, the last non-MLS team to win the tournament. The Rapids play their home games at Dick's Sporting Goods Park in Commerce City, since moving into the stadium after it opened during the 2007 season.

== History ==
=== Early years ===
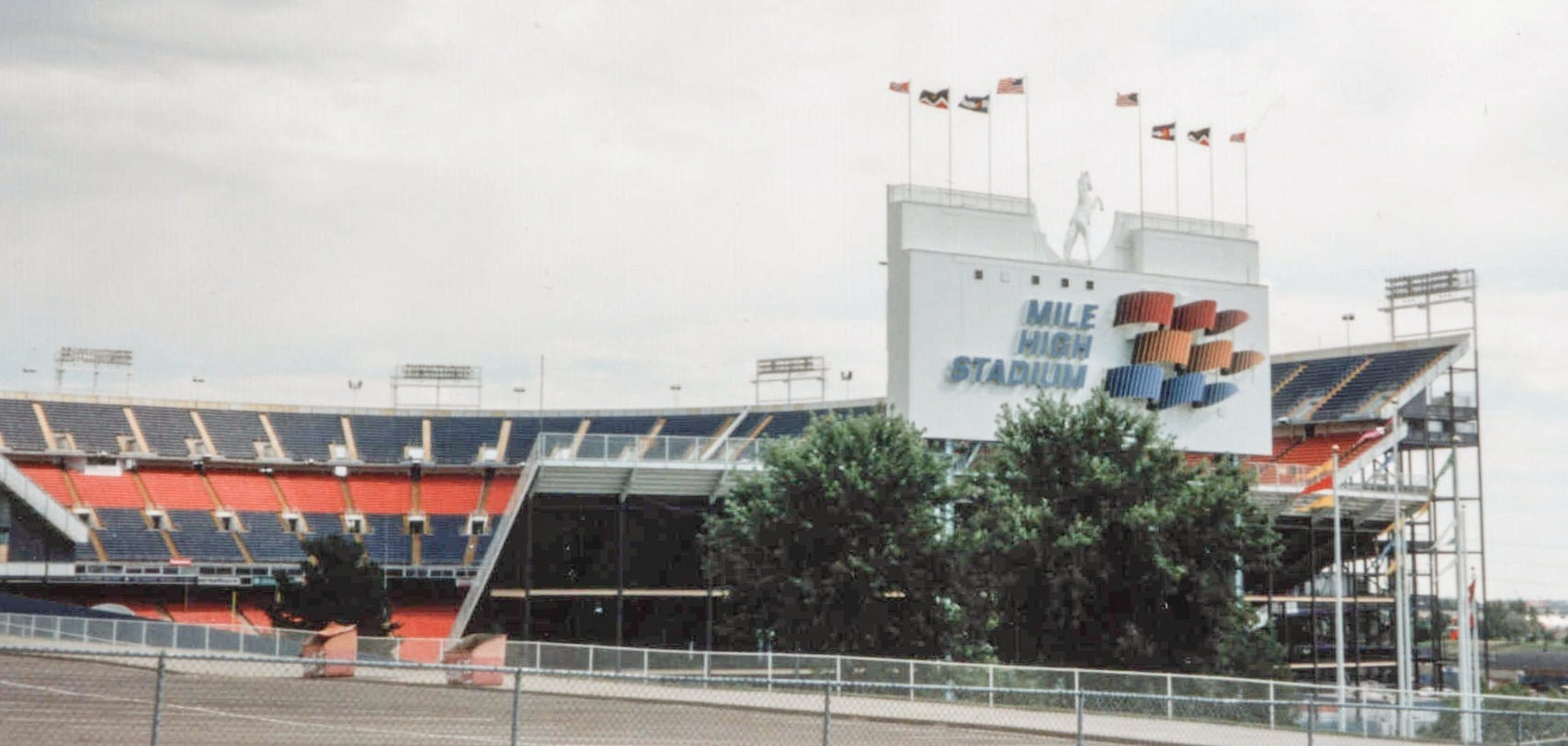
The Rapids played at Mile High Stadium from 1996 to 2001

The Colorado Rapids were one of the ten founding clubs of Major League Soccer, owned and operated by the Anschutz Corporation. The inaugural 1996 season was a forgettable one for Colorado. Despite fielding experienced players like Shaun Bartlett, Chris Henderson, Chris Woods, Roy Wegerle and Marcelo Balboa, and head coach Bob Houghton, the team finished last in the Western Conference with the worst record in the league. Balboa became the first player ever to score for the club and also the first to record a goal at Mile High Stadium (in 1996).

For the following season, Glenn Myernick was hired as a new head coach and Dan Counce joined as a general manager. Myernick and Counce brought new faces to the squad including Paul Bravo, Wolde Harris, Ross Paule, and keeper Marcus Hahnemann. The team struggled early on, but rallied to grab a post-season spot. The Rapids pulled off two upsets and advanced to the 1997 MLS Cup final. Chris Henderson scored a mid-air scissor kick goal past Dallas keeper Mark Dodd in the 87th minute in the Western Conference final, ensuring Colorado's place in the MLS Cup final. They scored in the MLS Cup (hosted at the home stadium of the opposing club) thanks to a goal by Adrián Paz, with the team and club barely able to make the trip thanks to an impending record snowstorm in Denver, but lost the final 2–1 to D.C. United.

Colorado continued on a roller coaster of success alternating with major disappointment: Myernick brought in more new players including Anders Limpar and Marcus Hahnemann, and the club made it to the 1999 U.S. Open Cup final, only to be upset 2–0 by the Rochester Raging Rhinos.

During the 2000 season, player Marcelo Balboa scored a bicycle kick which garnered the Goal of the Year. The team clinched a playoff spot in the final game of the season against the Los Angeles Galaxy, with Paul Bravo scoring in the 97th minute.

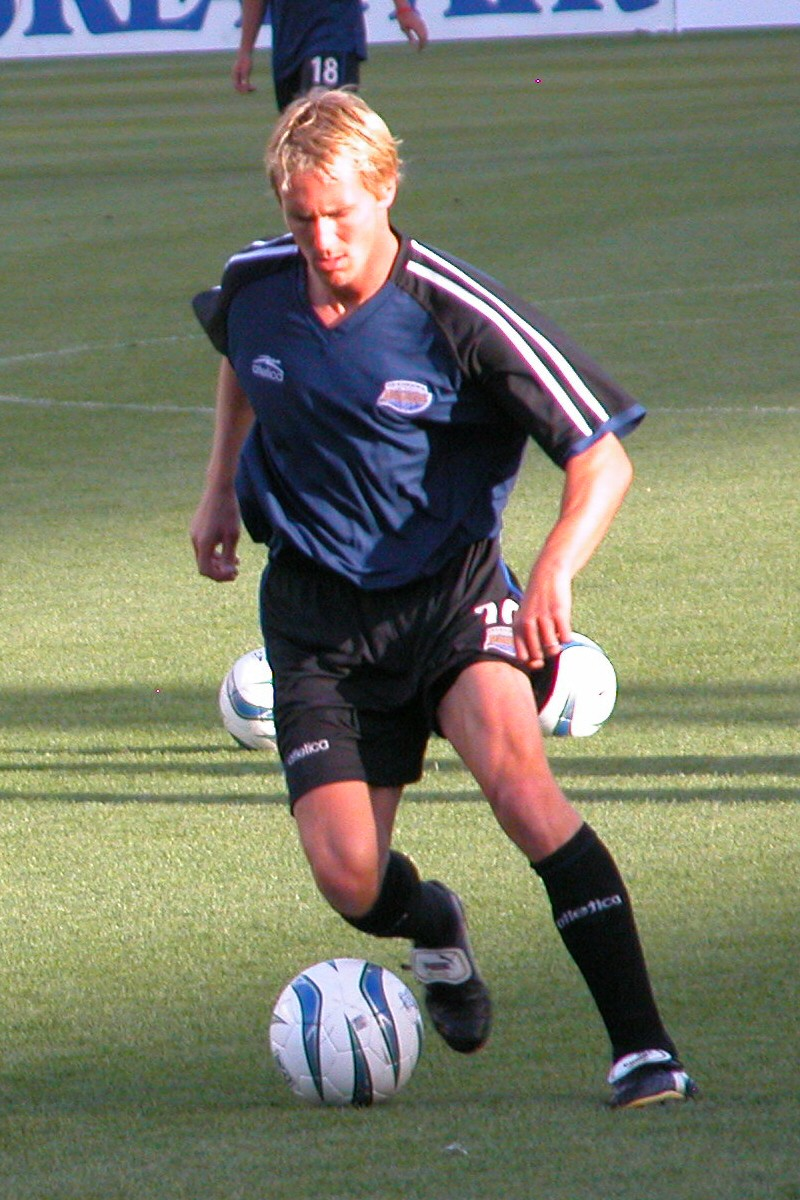
Chris Henderson playing for the Rapids in 2004

In 2001, Tim Hankinson took the reins as Colorado's new head coach. Scottish striker John Spencer also joined the club that year. While Hankinson did bring effective players like Mark Chung, Chris Henderson, Carlos Valderrama, and Joe Cannon to the squad—and made the playoffs every year—Hankinson also signed a number of expensive and unsuccessful players including Zizi Roberts and Darryl Powell. During his coaching stint, the club also traded away club legend Marcelo Balboa, who would play one game for MetroStars before retiring.

The Rapids set a new MLS record for the lowest home Goals Against Average over an entire season with at 0.53 by only allowing eight goals in 15 matches at Invesco Field during the season, and never more than one in a single game. After Kansas City broke the Rapids' MLS record 16-game home undefeated streak on June 9, the Black & Blue reeled off 11 more undefeated home games. On the year Colorado was undefeated when scoring more than one goal, a credit to the play of goalkeeper Joe Cannon and the suffocating defense.

=== 2007–2013 ===
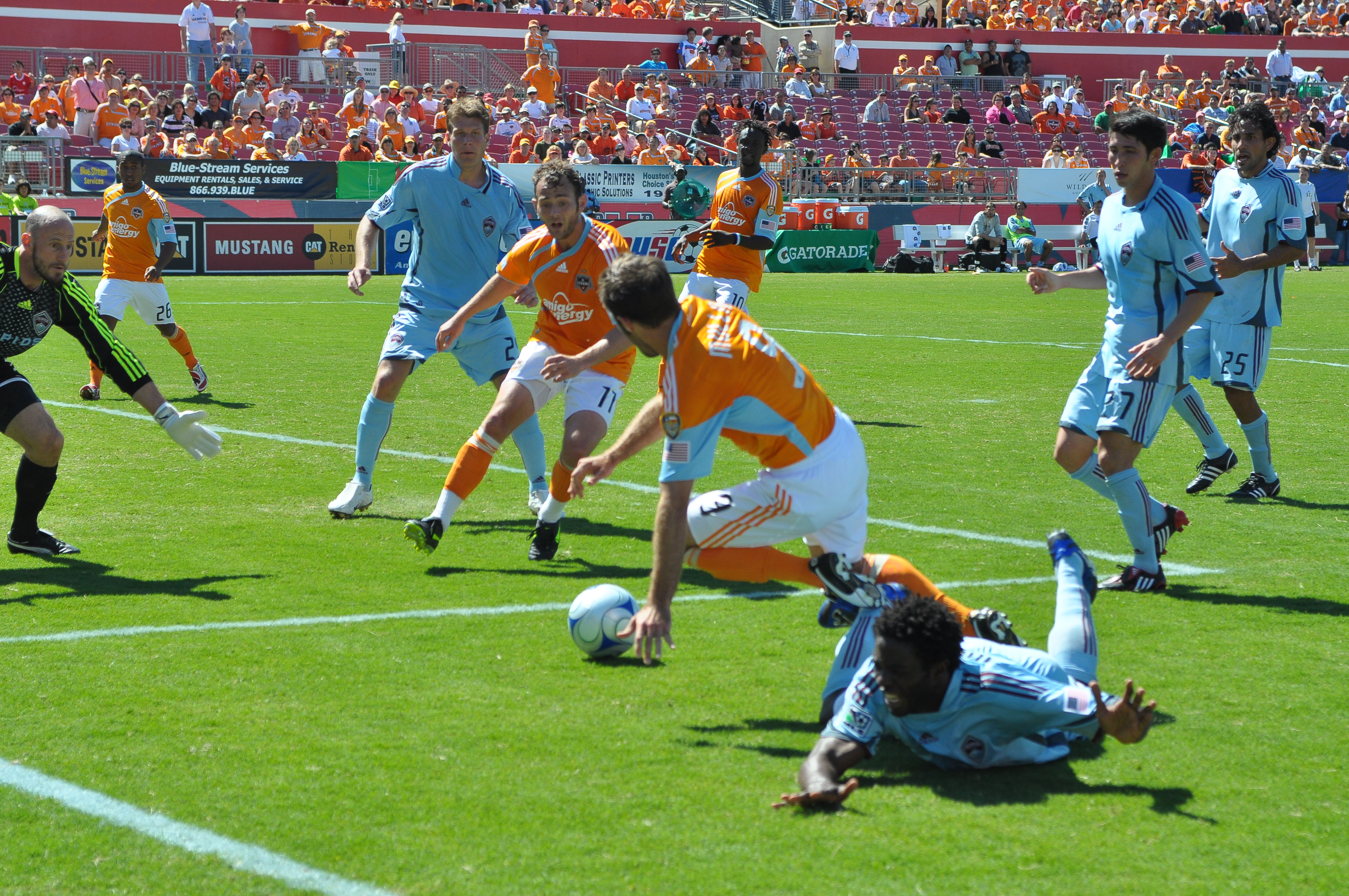
The Rapids (in pale blue) in action against Houston Dynamo in 2009

New head executive Jeff Plush took over the business responsibilities of the club when he was named Managing Director in January 2006. The club's colors were changed to burgundy and blue, to align with other clubs owned by Kroenke Sports Enterprises. This accompanied the company's commitment to building the world's largest professional soccer stadium and fields complex, Dick's Sporting Goods Park, which opened to worldwide acclaim in March 2007, and formulating relationships with another KSE soccer club, Arsenal of the English Premier League and Pachuca of Mexico.

The Rapids enjoyed a successful inaugural year at Dick's Sporting Goods Park, hosting numerous international exhibitions and tournaments on the stadium's complex, and successfully bid and won the rights to host and produce the 2007 MLS All-Star Game; on the pitch though the team's record was 9–13–8. The team started out strong with a 2–1 victory over D.C. United in frigid conditions. Herculez Gomez became the first player to score in the Rapids' brand new stadium. The team had a long winless streak that saw them sink in the standings. Colorado ultimately finished just shy of a playoff spot. Major low points in the season included an embarrassing 5–0 loss to the Seattle Sounders in the Lamar Hunt U.S. Open Cup, and a defeat to Real Salt Lake that saw them lose both a playoff berth and the possession of the Rocky Mountain Cup. The club won the MLS Reserve League for the second consecutive year.

Heading into the 2008 season, Rapids GM Charlie Wright added depth to the midfield and defense. Major signings included Christian Gómez and Jose Burciaga Jr. The 2008 season saw a resurgent Rapids side, which started off the season with a complete thrashing of David Beckham and the LA Galaxy by a 4–0 score on Opening Day to launch the season. However, an inconsistent mid-season stretch where, for 13 games, the Rapids could not win two games in a row or lose 2 in a row, saw Clavijo resign from the head coach position for personal reasons, and saw Gary Smith, an assistant coach who came from the Arsenal F.C. system, take over on an interim basis with 11 games left in the season. Under Smith's direction, the Rapids surged into the playoff race, with two key away wins, but fall short of the playoffs in the last game of the season, against Real Salt Lake. Salt Lake tied the Rapids 1–1 in the 90th minute of that game to eliminate the Rapids from playoff contention.

The 2009 campaign featured head coach Gary Smith in his first full season. Smith's first appointment was ex-England international Steve Guppy as his assistant; Guppy had spent the previous season at USL-1 team Rochester Rhinos as their player assistant coach. Shortly after, Rapids veteran midfielder Pablo Mastroeni re-signed with the club for four years after mulling potential offers from Europe. The Rapids also signed new four-year contracts with midfielders Colin Clark and Nick LaBrocca and defenders Jordan Harvey and Kosuke Kimura. The Colorado Rapids acquired former QPR and Chicago Fire goalkeeper Matt Pickens to replace Senegalese goalkeeper Bouna Coundoul. The other major roster move included the arrival of Iván Guerrero from D.C. United in exchange for midfielder Christian Gomez and backup goalkeeper Mike Graczyk. The media criticized the Rapids for not making more roster changes for the 2009 season. However, the core of the team remained intact.

==== 2010 MLS Cup Champions ====
The 2010 campaign featured many roster moves: Danny Earls, Jeff Larentowicz, Claudio Lopez, Quincy Amarikwa, Ian Joyce, and Wells Thompson join the club. The offseason also included a new contract for star forward Conor Casey. The Colorado Rapids also excited many of the ultras supporter groups by the creation and construction of a supporters terrace within Dick's Sporting Goods Park. During the summer transfer window, the Colorado Rapids signed academy youth player Davy Armstrong, and brought in defender Anthony Wallace from FC Dallas. Colorado also sent Mehdi Ballouchy to New York Red Bulls in exchange for Macoumba Kandji and acquired Brian Mullan from Houston Dynamo in exchange for Colin Clark. Following these changes, Colorado qualified for the MLS Cup playoffs and defeated the Columbus Crew in the first round. On November 13, Colorado hosted the San Jose Earthquakes in the MLS Eastern Conference Championship and won by a score of 1–0, leading to the team's first trip to the MLS Cup since 1997. Colorado faced off against FC Dallas in the finals. During the final, the Rapids trailed 1–0 at halftime. Conor Casey equalized in the second half to send the game to extra time. Macoumba Kandji helped set up the game-winner that went off FC Dallas defender George John. Colorado won the 2010 MLS Cup 2–1, Colorado's first MLS Cup championship and first major trophy in the club's history.

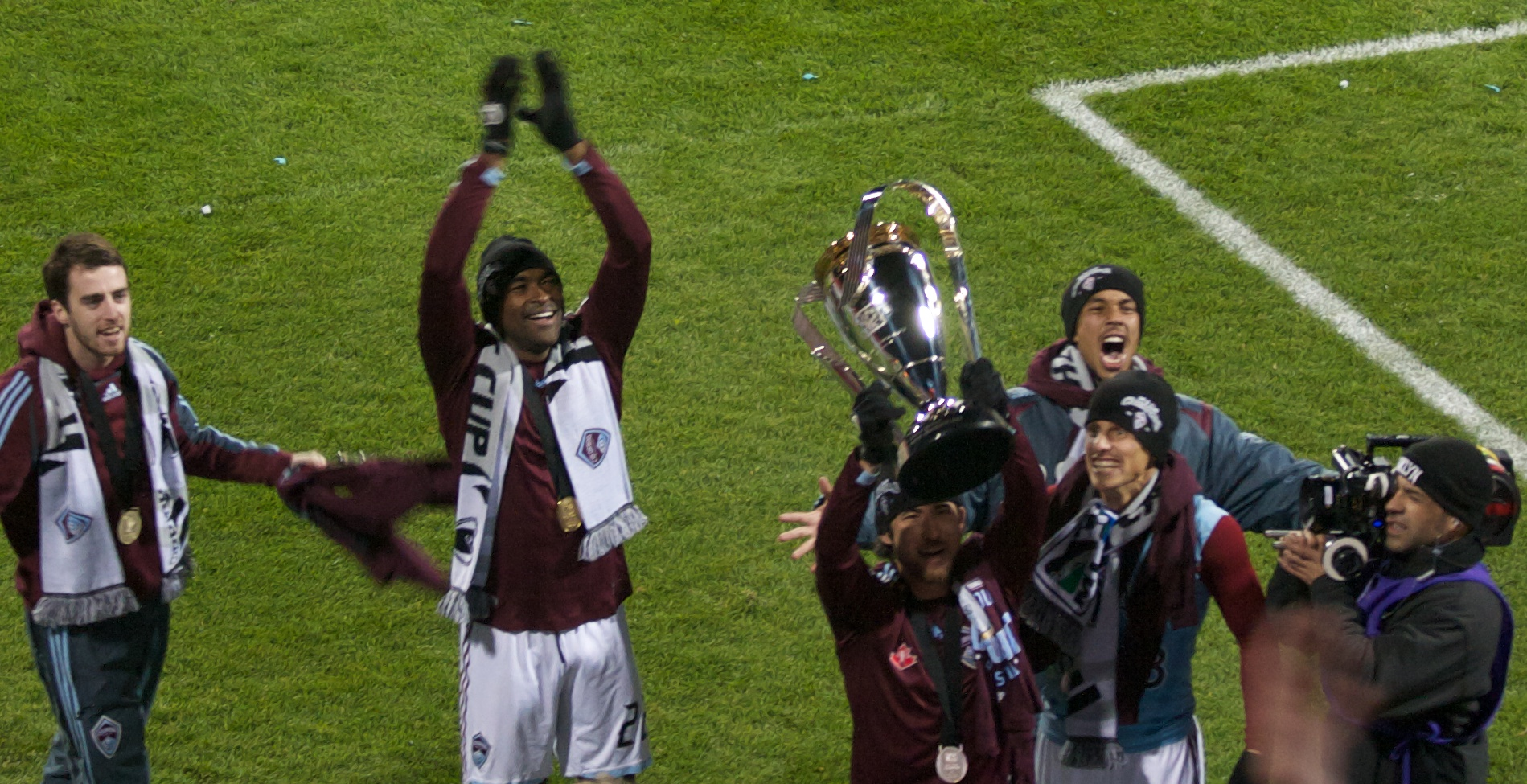
Colorado Rapids after winning MLS Cup 2010

The 2011 campaign led to no roster changes. However, Sanna Nyassi and Tyrone Marshall were signed from Seattle Sounders FC. Joseph Nane and Josh Janniere were additions from Toronto FC. Local product Steven Emory was signed after an open tryout during preseason. The Rapids made the headlines when Irish International and former Hull City striker Caleb Folan signed with the club. The primary departure was defender Julian Baudet. Since Colorado won the 2010 MLS Cup, they automatically qualified for the group stages of the 2011–2012 CONCACAF Champions League. On September 9, Colorado signed versatile defender Miguel Comminges. The Guadeloupe International can play at either Left or Right back. On September 13, Comminges made his debut for Colorado as a substitute in a 4–1 home loss to Club Santos Laguna in the CONCACAF Champions League.

The 2012 season began with several changes to the club. Oscar Pareja was appointed head coach following the departure of Gary Smith. The team traded Sanna Nyassi to the Montreal Impact, and Macoumba Kandji to Houston Dynamo. Acquiring Hunter Freeman, Jaime Castrillón, Luis Zapata, and young Kamani Hill and the loan of young talent Martín Rivero the Rapids looked to begin on a positive note. After defeating the Columbus Crew 2–0 on opening day, things seemed promising. However, as the season ticked by, things started to turn for the worse. Looking for a turnaround, Hárrison Henao was loaned and Brazilian Edu was signed. In July, Kosuke Kimura was traded to the Portland Timbers. Shortly after, defender Tyson Wahl was brought in via trade from the Montreal Impact. After a poor season, the Rapids looked for a late-season turnaround when they signed Hendry Thomas from Wigan Athletic. The Rapids were eliminated from playoff contention in late September ending hopes for another MLS cup.

The 2013 season for the Rapids saw massive changes made to the team. All-time leading goal scorer Conor Casey was released and Omar Cummings would be traded during the offseason, the Forward duo combining for 89 goals in the Rapids' careers. With the majority of the 2010 MLS Champions team gone (only 5 players remaining on the squad), the team looked considerably different. Coach Oscar Pareja wanting a squad of younger, more athletic players. Colorado finished the 2013 season campaign with a 14–11–9 (W-L-T) record which placed them fifth in the Western Conference, eighth in the overall standings. They were eliminated in the knockout round in the playoffs. During the off-season, Oscar Pareja revealed his desire to return to FC Dallas to be the head coach there after taking the opportunity to do so. Eventually, Colorado found his successor which would be none other than Colorado veteran Pablo Mastroeni who had previously retired as a player.

=== 2014–2020 ===
Under Mastroeni's first year as head coach, Colorado finished eighth in the West and seventeenth overall having 8 wins, 18 losses, and 8 ties having the Rapids fail to qualify for the MLS Cup Playoffs, after previously qualifying last year. Despite an upper-mid table performance to start the season, the club was plagued heavily by injuries, causing the team to go winless in their final fourteen matches of the season. In the U.S. Open Cup, the Rapids were eliminated from the tournament to the Atlanta Silverbacks. Additionally, they were unable to defend their Rocky Mountain Cup title, losing to rivals, Real Salt Lake.

During the off-season following the 2015 season, where Colorado finished last in the Western Conference, The Rapids had made major changes in their line up, which includes acquiring players: Shkelzen Gashi, Marco Pappa, Jermaine Jones and Tim Howard, who all joined by the summer transfer window. The club went on to having a successful 2016 campaign with a 15-game unbeaten streak and a trip to the western conference championship in which they lost to Seattle Sounders 3–1 aggregate. The 2017 campaign saw the departure of Jermaine Jones, and several weeks into the season, the Rapids made more changes to their roster by trading Sam Cronin and Marc Burch to new expansion side Minnesota United FC. The team struggled, and head coach Pablo Mastroeni was fired by the end of the season as the Rapids finished the 2017 season with 9 wins, 19 losses and 6 draws, good for 10th in the Western Conference.

For the 2018 season, the Rapids hired former New Zealand coach Anthony Hudson. The Rapids made many additions, including wingback Edgar Castillo and midfielder Jack Price while switching to Hudson's preferred 3–5–2 formation. The season began with the Rapids being eliminated from the 2018 CONCACAF Champions League by Toronto FC, a tournament they had qualified for on the strength of the 2016 campaign. The middle of the 2018 saw another major trade with 2017's leading goalscorer Dominique Badji being traded to FC Dallas for Kellyn Acosta. Despite the changes in the 2018 season, it ended with another 10th place Western Conference finish, with the Rapids accruing 8 wins, 19 losses and 7 draws.

For the 2019, the Rapids turned their attention to MLS veterans for additions to the roster adding Benny Feilhaber, Kei Kamara, Diego Rubio and Keegan Rosenberry. The team also added youngsters Jonathan Lewis, Matt Hundley, Sam Raben and Andre Shinyashiki to the squad. In the preseason, the Rapids parted ways with Sheklzen Gashi. Despite the changes to the team and scoring in every game but one, the Rapids began the 2019 season winless in their first 11 games. The Rapids parted ways with Hudson after going winless in the first nine games of the season. The club named Conor Casey as interim head coach on May 1. Casey led the Rapids to a record of 7 wins, 7 losses and 4 draws. On August 25, the Rapids named Robin Fraser the club's ninth permanent head coach. Fraser posted a 5–2–0 (W-L-D) record, falling just shy of the postseason.

The Rapids made several moves ahead of 2020, trading for Auston Trusty and permanently acquiring Lalas Abubakar. The club also brought in Drew Moor, a 2010 MLS Cup champion with Colorado, as well as goalkeeper William Yarbrough, midfielder Nicolas Benezet and Designated Player Younes Namli. The Rapids started 2020 with two wins before MLS paused its season in early March due to COVID-19. Colorado was placed in Group D of the MLS is Back Tournament with Real Salt Lake, Sporting Kansas City and Minnesota United FC. The MLS regular season restarted in August with Colorado taking three points from four games. On September 12, the Rapids defeated Real Salt Lake 5–0, marking Colorado's first ever win at Rio Tinto Stadium and beginning a run of three wins in four, including three shutouts. After several players and team staff tested positive for COVID-19, the Rapids paused their season, eventually cancelling five matches. After a full month between games, the Rapids returned to action with losses at Sporting KC and Minnesota. MLS changed the MLS Cup Playoffs qualifying format to points-per-game on Oct. 31. The Rapids then defeated defending MLS Cup champion Seattle Sounders FC, 3–1, before clinching a playoff berth with a 1–0 win at Portland Timbers on Nov. 4. Colorado closed the regular season with a 2–1 win at Houston Dynamo on Nov. 8. Colorado visited Minnesota in the first round of the Audi 2020 MLS Cup Playoffs, falling 3–0. The season featured break-out performances by Rapids Homegrown defender Sam Vines and Homegrown midfielder Cole Bassett. Vines played every minute of every regular season match, while Bassett led the team with five goals and five assists. Both were named to MLS 22 Under 22 for a second consecutive year.

In April 2026, the Rapids celebrated their 30th season with an anniversary game versus Inter Miami and their captain Lionel Messi. The game drew over 75,000 fans making it the second-highest attended MLS game in league history.

== Colors and badge ==
Colorado Rapids first logo (1996–2001)

The Rapids' image has evolved a great deal since their inception. The team has undergone two complete re-brandings. Originally using green as the primary uniform color, the team changed to black and blue for the 2003 season.

As Colorado were preparing to move into Dick's Sporting Goods Park for the 2007 season, the club re-invented themselves again to more closely align with the DNA and color scheme of other KSE teams, changing their colors to burgundy and blue, and creating a brand new shield logo to fit in with more traditional global soccer marks.

Colorado has had three logos in their history. They originally first used the "river" logo as their primary crest with the "circular" logo as a secondary one. In 2002, the two logos would switch, with the "circular" one becoming the primary. For the 2007 re-branding, the Rapids created the new shield-style logo, which is the one that is currently used today. Its main features consist of a mountain representing the Rocky mountains in the region as well as the number 96, referring to the franchise's Inaugural season.

The original look of the Rapids sported a predominantly white kit with green trim, when the club's uniform supplier was Puma. Other minor colors such as gold and blue were occasionally incorporated, with the club's association with Reebok. Eventually, black became more heavily used and eventually overtook white as the more dominant color that accompanied the green, when the club switched to Kappa.

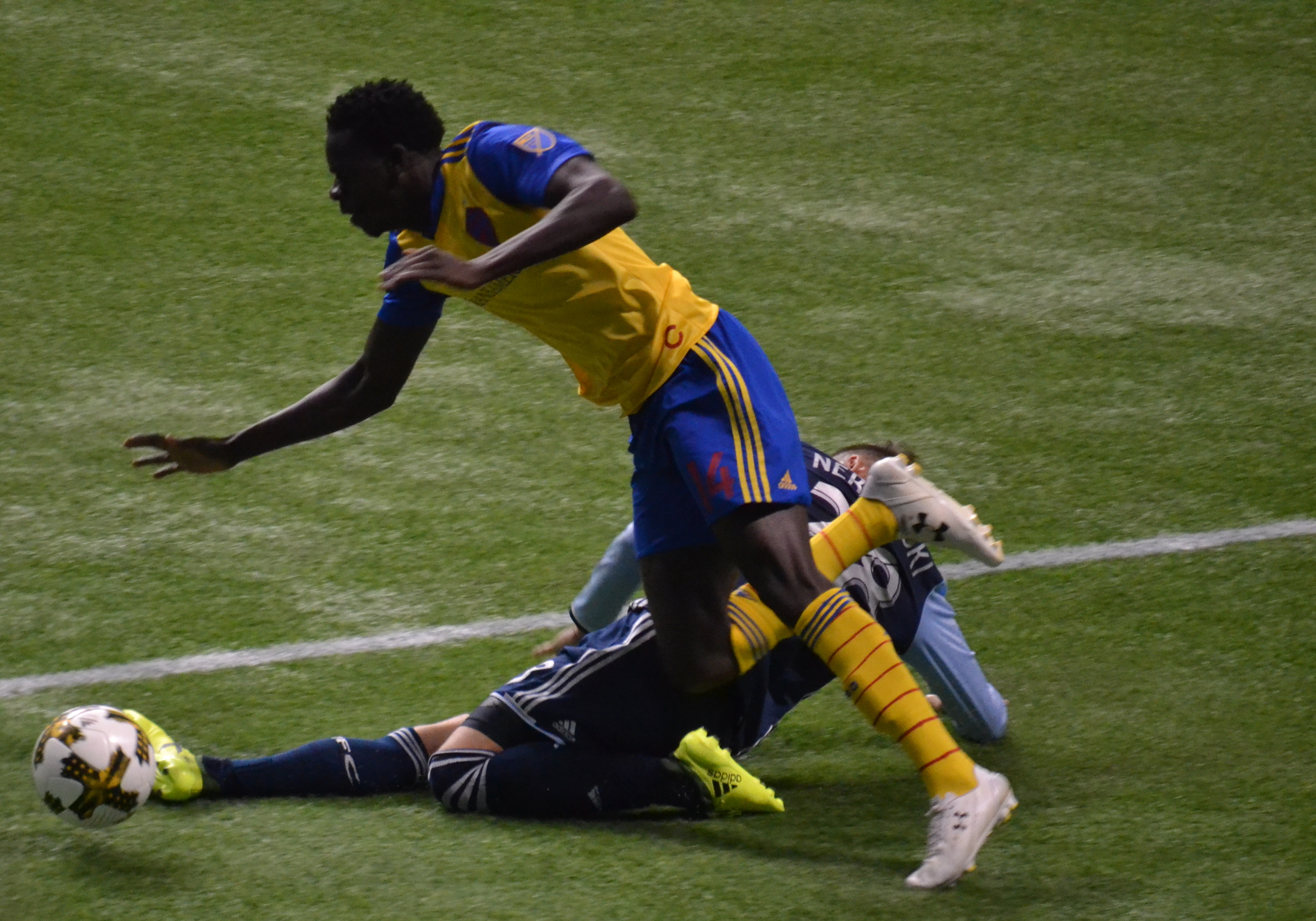
The yellow away kit was worn by the Rapids from 2015 to 2018

The Rapids underwent an image change prior to the 2003 season. Following the club's switch to Atletica, the uniform colors switched to black and blue vertical stripes, similar to the uniforms worn by Italian Serie A club Inter Milan. The blue and black vertical stripes remained almost unchanged when MLS adopted Adidas as their league-wide kit sponsor.

The uniforms underwent one last change for the 2007 season. The Rapids now sport burgundy (Pantone 202) and sky blue (Pantone 278) as their primary colors. The Colorado Rapids also have a brand new third uniform, consisting of a white shirt, white socks and burgundy shorts.

The Rapids' home jersey for 2013 featured the same burgundy primary color and featured the names of all season ticket holders imprinted in the fabric. The Rapids also had a special away jersey for the 2013 season, featuring the colors of the Colorado state flag.

The club's use of burgundy led to Scottish pop band Little Eye, fronted by the brother of Rapids player Jamie Smith, writing a song about the team called "Burgundy Sky", which is now used as the Rapids official anthem.

The Colorado Rapids were the last existing MLS club to earn a paid sponsorship deal on the front of their jerseys. In May 2014, the club announced a five-year sponsorship deal with Ciao Telecom. In October 2014, the Rapids sued Ciao for missed payments and quietly disassociated from the company. The club later reached an agreement with Transamerica as a jersey sponsor in 2015. The Rapids then extended their agreement with Transamerica and they would continue being partners until the end of the 2020 season. In November 2022, the Rapids confirmed a partnership with UCHealth, marking the end of a two-year period without a jersey sponsor. Under this agreement, UCHealth will serve as the team's jersey sponsor until the conclusion of the 2029 Major League Soccer season.

=== Sponsorship ===
Period	Kit manufacturer	Shirt sponsor	Sleeve sponsor
1996	Reebok	—	
1997–1998	Puma	—	
1999–2002	Kappa	—	
2003–2004	Atletica	—	
2005–2013	Adidas	—	
2014	Adidas	Ciao Telecom	—
2015–2019	Adidas	Transamerica	—
2020	Adidas	Transamerica	Western Union
2021–2022	Adidas	—	
2023–2024	Adidas	UCHealth	—
2025–present	Adidas	UCHealth	Kiewit

== Stadium ==
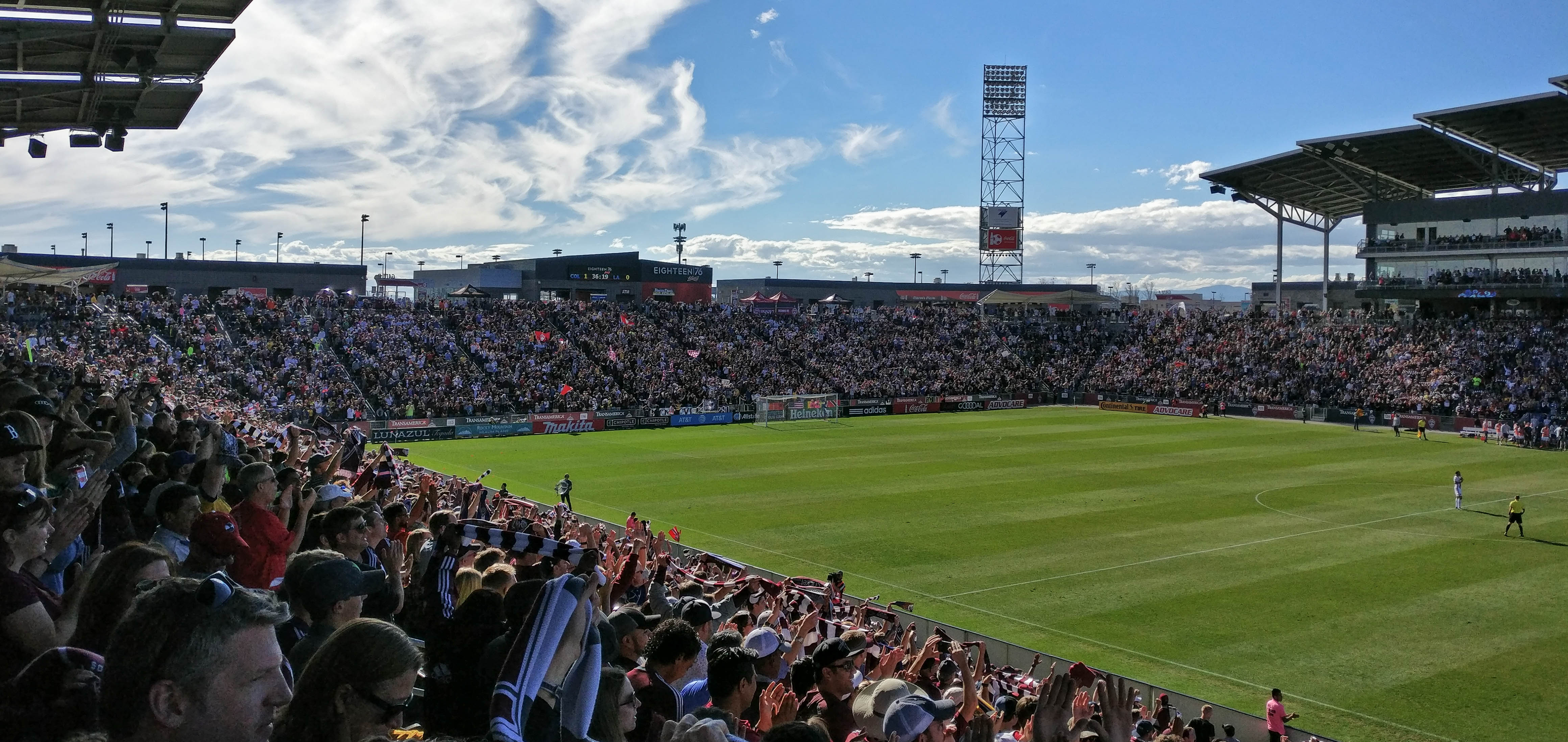
Dick's Sporting Goods Park during a game between the Colorado Rapids and Los Angeles Galaxy (November 2016)

Name	Location	Years in use
Mile High Stadium	Denver, Colorado	1996–2001
Invesco Field at Mile High	Denver, Colorado	2002–2006
North Area Athletic Complex	Arvada, Colorado	2003; 1 game in U.S. Open Cup
Dick's Sporting Goods Park	Commerce City, Colorado	2007–present

The Rapids play their home games at Dick's Sporting Goods Park in Commerce City (approximately 8 miles north of downtown Denver). The stadium capacity is 19,680 and cost $131 million to construct. It is also referred to as a soccer-specific stadium, since it was constructed for the Colorado Rapids. The soccer stadium opened on April 7, 2007. The stadium complex includes youth soccer fields and various retail establishments, and is owned and operated by Kroenke Sports Enterprises (KSE) which also owns the Colorado Avalanche, Denver Nuggets, Colorado Crush and Colorado Mammoth sports franchises. The team had sought a soccer-specific stadium as early as 1999 due to the lack of control at Mile High.

The team's first home stadium was Mile High Stadium, a large American football venue shared with the Denver Broncos. The Rapids played there until September 8, 2001, and had an average attendance of over 13,000 for most matches. The stadium closed at the end of the 2001 season and the Rapids moved to the Broncos' new stadium, Invesco Field at Mile High, after signing a three-year lease in January 2002. The Rapids would use the lower bowl of the stadium with a reduced capacity of 27,000 seats for most matches. The team had faced potential relocation or contraction without the long-term lease; other options in the Denver area, including Folsom Field in Boulder, were rejected for various issues.

The Rapids have one of the highest discrepancies between their home record and away record in MLS. From their inception in 1996 through the 2014 season, the Rapids record at home was 146–73–6, winning about 65% of their matches at home. However, the Rapids were only 70–164–4 on the road during that same time span, winning only 29% of their games on the road.

== Club culture ==
=== Rocky Mountain Cup ===
In 2005, Real Salt Lake joined Major League Soccer and became the Rapids' closest neighbor. The supporter groups of the two clubs created a regular-season competition between the two sides to foster and memorialize this rivalry. Each season, the Rocky Mountain Cup is determined by the winner of the head-to-head fixtures within league play.

=== Supporters ===
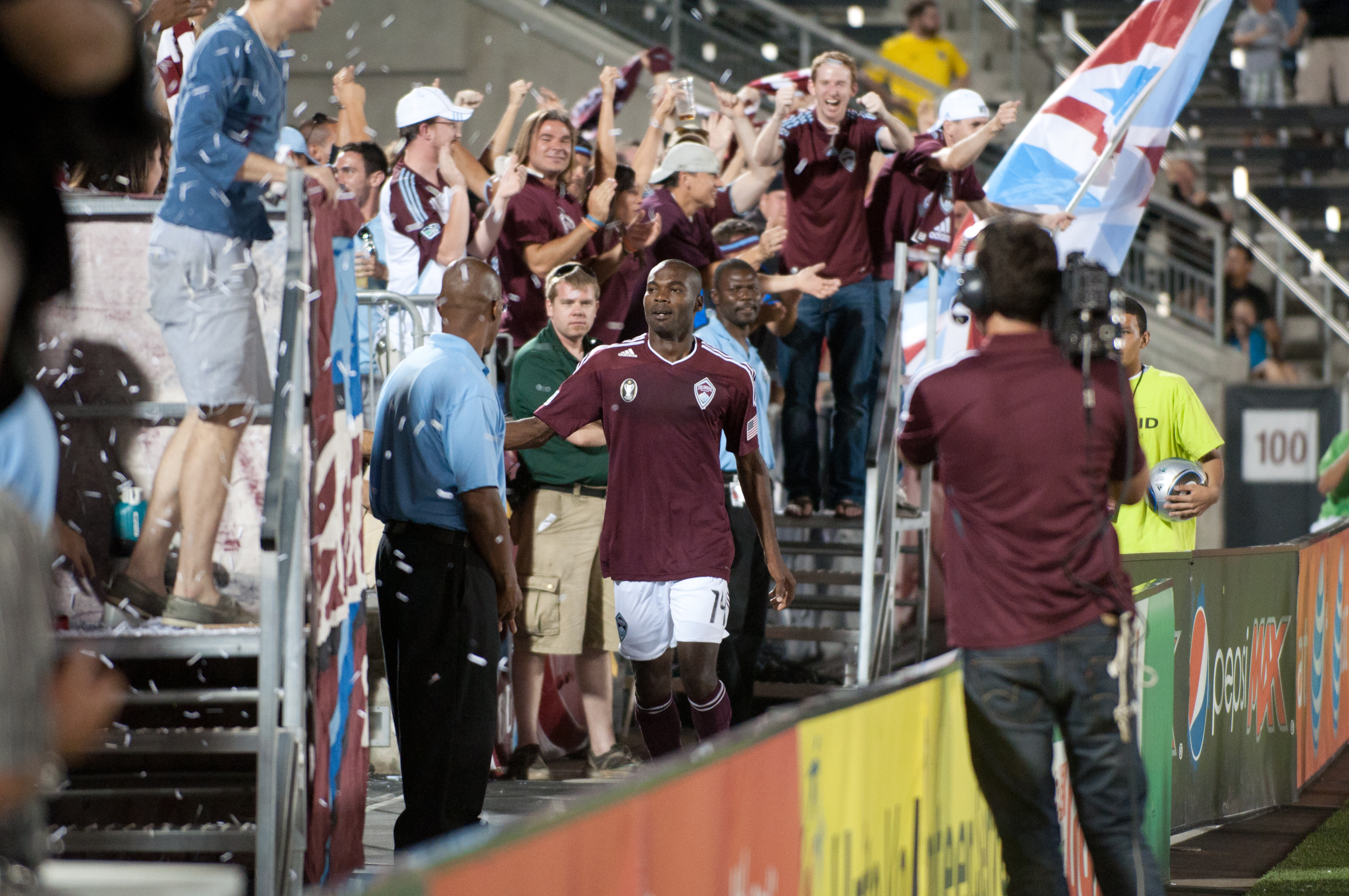
Omar Cummings greeting the fans at the Supporters Terrace

The Rapids had strong fan attendance in 2002 when they led the league in average fans per game. For 2011–12 CONCACAF Champions League (CCL) games, the Supporters Terrace was officially closed. CONCACAF regulations require "all-seater" stadiums, and the terraces at Dick's Sporting Goods Park are standing-only areas with no stadium seating. CCL group stage fixtures have seen the Pid Army and the Bulldog Supporters Group relocated to either midfield in the East stands (against Isidro Metapán) or directly behind the South goal in sections 117 and 118 (against Santos Laguna and Real España). In 2012, it was revealed that the Rapids had 3,561 season ticket holders after the club's front office mistakenly emailed a spreadsheet that contained a list of every season ticket holder in the season ticket base. The front office admitted to the mistake in a follow-up email to the season ticket holders. On February 9, 2013, the leaders of the club's three supporters groups—Class VI, the Pid Army and the Bulldog Supporters Group—announced that they would combine into one group going forward: Centennial 38.

== Broadcasting ==
Rapids matches appeared on several channels including Altitude Television, which is owned by Kroenke Sports Entertainment as are the Colorado Avalanche and Denver Nuggets. Major League Soccer determined in 2007 that every game must be televised, either through a regional (or local) TV station, or a national channel.

Prior to 2013, the play-by-play duties were covered by a variety of voices, notably Todd Romero and Marc Stout, before the Rapids brought in former BBC sports broadcaster, Richard Fleming. Fleming spent 16 years at the BBC, covering the FIFA World Cup, Confederations Cup, the European Championship, the CAF Africa Cup of Nations, and the English Premier League. He even reported on a World Cup qualifier in North Korea, and later worked for Arsenal TV. He was joined by U.S. legend Marcelo Balboa as color analyst during the team's era on Altitude.

Connor Cape and others also do play-by-play for Altitude Radio.

From 2023, every Rapids match is available via MLS Season Pass on the Apple TV app.

== Players and staff ==
=== Roster ===
As of September 28, 2026

Note: Flags indicate national team as defined under FIFA eligibility rules; some limited exceptions apply. Players may hold more than one non-FIFA nationality.

No.	Pos.	Nation	Player
1	GK	USA	Zack Steffen
2	DF	USA	Keegan Rosenberry
4	DF	USA	Reggie Cannon
5	DF	ESP	Loïc Williams
6	DF	ENG	Rob Holding
7	FW	ENG	Morgan Whittaker
8	MF	NGR	Hamzat Ojediran
9	FW	ISR	Sayed Abu Farchi
10	MF	USA	Paxten Aaronson
11	FW	GHA	Ibrahim Sadiq
12	MF	USA	Josh Atencio
13	MF	TTO	Wayne Frederick
15	MF	GHA	Ali Fadal
16	FW	USA	Alex Harris

No.	Pos.	Nation	Player
21	MF	USA	Ted Ku-DiPietro
24	DF	USA	Noah Cobb
26	FW	SEN	Mamadou Billo Diop
27	FW	CAN	Kimani Stewart-Baynes
29	DF	VEN	Miguel Navarro (on loan from Talleres)
31	GK	USA	Adam Beaudry
32	FW	LCA	Donavan Phillip
33	DF	CAN	Kosi Thompson
41	GK	DEN	Nicolas Hansen
61	GK	USA	Bryan Dowd
77	FW	USA	Darren Yapi
88	MF	FRA	Youssef Maziz
93	FW	BFA	Georgi Minoungou
99	DF	USA	Jackson Travis

=== Out on loan ===
Note: Flags indicate national team as defined under FIFA eligibility rules; some limited exceptions apply. Players may hold more than one non-FIFA nationality.

No.	Pos.	Nation	Player
18	FW	USA	Bryce Jamison (on loan to Colorado Springs Switchbacks)
47	FW	CAN	Sydney Wathuta (on loan to Orange County SC)

No.	Pos.	Nation	Player
51	GK	USA	Zack Campagnolo (on loan to St. Louis City SC)
—	FW	AUS	Akol Akon (on loan to Sydney FC)

=== Team management ===
Front office
Owner	Stan Kroenke
President / general manager	Pádraig Smith
Sporting director	Fran Taylor
Director of player personnel	Brian Crookham
Technical director	Chris Cartlidge
Vice president, club administration & compliance	Ruth Fahy
Player welfare Officer	Brian Reed
Assistant director of player personnel	James Roeling
Director of scouting	Alex Aldridge
Director of analytics	Matt Pfeffer
Scouting video analyst	Brennan Stieneker
Data scientist	Karan Juneja
SafeSport manager	Nicole Johnson
Coaching staff
Head coach	Matt Wells
Assistant coach	Alastair Harris; Rob Burch; Elliot Prost
Goalkeeper coach	Chris Sharpe
Development coach	Drew Moor
Analyst	Matt Gordon
Colorado Rapids Academy
Academy director	Andrew Kewley
Academy head coaches	Marcelo Balboa; Andrew Butler; Andrew Kewley

Last updated: January 18, 2025

=== Head coach history ===
As of November 17, 2023

Name	Nat	Tenure	MLS record	Winning percentage	Games coached
Bob Houghton	England	February 1, 1996 – September 10, 1996	9–16–6 (2–3 shootout)	42.86%	31
Roy Wegerle (interim)	United States	September 13, 1996 – November 19, 1996	0–1–0	N/A	1
Glenn Myernick	United States	November 19, 1996 – December 19, 2000	53–53–22 (10–8 shootout)	41.41%	128
Tim Hankinson	United States	December 20, 2000 – December 15, 2004	39–45–30	34.21%	114
Fernando Clavijo	United States	December 22, 2004 – August 20, 2008	44–53–27	35.48%	124
Gary Smith	England	November 11, 2008 – November 7, 2011	34–27–33	36.17%	94
Óscar Pareja	Colombia	January 6, 2012 – January 4, 2014	25–30–13	36.77%	68
Pablo Mastroeni	United States	January 4, 2014 – August 15, 2017	38–50–35	30.89%	123
Steve Cooke (interim)	England	August 15, 2017 – November 29, 2017	3–7–2	N/A	12
Anthony Hudson	England	November 29, 2017 – May 1, 2019	8–26–9	18.61%	43
Conor Casey (interim)	United States	May 1, 2019 – August 25, 2019	7–7–4	N/A	18
Robin Fraser	United States	August 25, 2019 – September 5, 2023	46–45–34	36.80%	125
Chris Little (interim)	Scotland	September 5, 2023 – November 17, 2023	2–3–3	25.00%	8
Chris Armas	United States	November 17, 2023 – October 27, 2025	3–3–2	37.50%	64
Matt Wells	England	December 23, 2025 – current	5–9–1	33.34%	15

=== General manager and sporting director history ===
Name	Nat	Tenure
Dan Counce	United States	1997–2005
Paul Bravo	United States	2009–2014
Pádraig Smith	Ireland	2014–present

=== Gallery of Honor ===
The Rapids Gallery of Honor was established in 2003 to honor the club's all-time top players. The Gallery of Honor is commemorated with signage on the main stand on the west end of Dick's Sporting Goods Park with the players' names and uniform numbers. The two inaugural entrants were Marcelo Balboa and Paul Bravo, co-entered in the Gallery's formation during halftime of the Rapids' home match on July 4, 2003, at Invesco Field at Mile High.

- (United States) #17 Marcelo Balboa (inducted 2003)
- (United States) #9 Paul Bravo (inducted 2003)
- (United States) #19 Chris Henderson (inducted 2007)
- (Scotland) #7 John Spencer (inducted 2009)
- (United States) #25 Pablo Mastroeni (inducted 2014)
- (United States) #9 Conor Casey (inducted 2017)
- (United States) #3 Drew Moor (inducted 2023)

== Honors ==
=== Domestic ===
- MLS Cup
  - Champions (1): 2010
  - Runners-up (1): 1997
- U.S. Open Cup
  - Runners-up (1): 1999
- Supporters' Shield
  - Runners-up (2): 2016, 2021
- Eastern Conference (Playoff)
  - Champions (1): 2010
- Western Conference (Playoff)
  - Champions (1): 1997
  - Runners-up (3): 2005, 2006, 2016
- Western Conference (Regular Season)
  - Champions (1): 2021
  - Runners-up (1): 2016

=== Reserve ===
- MLS Reserve League
  - Champions (2): 2006, 2007

=== Friendly ===
- Rocky Mountain Cup (8): 2005, 2006, 2013, 2015, 2020, 2024, 2025, 2026

== Team records ==
=== Year-by-year results ===
This is a partial list of the last five seasons completed by the Rapids. For the full season-by-season history, see List of Colorado Rapids seasons.

Season	League									Position		Playoffs	USOC	Continental		Average attendance	Top goalscorer(s)	
Season	Pld	W	L	D	GF	GA	GD	Pts	PPG	Conf.	Overall	Playoffs	USOC	CCL	LC	Average attendance	Name(s)	Goals
2018	34	8	19	7	36	63	−27	31	0.91	11th	21st	DNQ	R4	Ro16	NH	15,333	(Senegal) Dominique Badji	7
2019	34	12	16	6	58	63	−5	42	1.24	9th	16th	DNQ	R4	DNQ	DNQ	14,284	(Sierra Leone) Kei Kamara	14
2020	18	8	6	4	32	28	+4	28	1.56	5th	10th	R1	NH	DNQ	DNQ	13,062	(United States) Cole Bassett (United States) Jonathan Lewis	5
2021	34	17	7	10	51	35	+16	61	1.79	1st	2nd	QF	NH	DNQ	DNQ	12,014	(Colombia) Michael Barrios	8
2022	34	11	13	10	46	57	–11	43	1.26	10th	18th	DNQ	Ro32	Ro16	DNQ	14,473	(Chile) Diego Rubio	16
2023	34	5	17	12	26	54	–28	27	0.79	14th	28th	DNQ	Ro16	DNQ	DNQ	15,409	(United States) Cole Bassett	6
2024	34	15	5	14	61	60	1	50	1.47	7th	12th	R1	Ro16	DNQ	3rd *qualifying for CCL	15,686	(Brazil) Rafael Navarro	15

1. Avg. attendance include statistics from league matches only.
2. Top goalscorer(s) includes all goals scored in League, MLS Cup Playoffs, U.S. Open Cup, MLS is Back Tournament, CONCACAF Champions League, FIFA Club World Cup, and other competitive continental matches. 1. Avg. attendance include statistics from league matches only.
2. Top goalscorer(s) includes all goals scored in League, MLS Cup Playoffs, U.S. Open Cup, MLS is Back Tournament, CONCACAF Champions League, FIFA Club World Cup, and other competitive continental matches.

=== By opponent ===
Regular season record
Team	W	L	D	Total
Atlanta United FC	1	4	0	5
Austin FC	5	3	2	10
Charlotte FC	1	0	2	3
Chicago Fire	14	20	10	44
Chivas USA ^{2}	14	7	7	28
Columbus Crew SC	20	14	11	45
D.C. United	14	21	11	46
FC Cincinnati	2	2	0	4
FC Dallas	30	35	21	86
Houston Dynamo FC	15	13	13	41
Inter Miami CF	0	0	1	1
LA Galaxy	32	40	13	85
Los Angeles FC	4	7	1	12
Miami Fusion ^{1}	3	7	0	10
Minnesota United FC	7	7	4	18
CF Montréal	6	2	1	9
Nashville SC	0	2	1	3
New England Revolution	21	19	9	49
New York City FC	1	3	3	7
New York Red Bulls	20	16	8	44
Orlando City SC	1	5	2	8
Philadelphia Union	4	4	6	14
Portland Timbers	11	14	7	32
Real Salt Lake	17	29	13	59
St. Louis City SC	2	1	2	5
San Jose Earthquakes	26	33	19	78
Seattle Sounders FC	8	23	5	36
Sporting Kansas City	26	31	20	77
Tampa Bay Mutiny ^{1}	8	7	0	15
Toronto FC	8	9	3	20
Vancouver Whitecaps FC	13	11	8	32

As of March 29, 2025

1. Dissolved after 2001 season.
2. Dissolved after 2014 season.

=== International tournaments ===
Season	Tournament	Round	W	L	D	GF	GA
1998	CONCACAF Champions' Cup	Qualifying Playoff	1	1	0	3	4
2011	CONCACAF Champions League	Group stage	2	3	1	9	12
2018	CONCACAF Champions League	Round of 16	0	1	1	0	2
2022	CONCACAF Champions League	Round of 16	1	1	0	1	1

== Player records ==
=== Appearances ===
As of September 24, 2024

Rank	Player	Years	MLS	Playoffs	US Open Cup	Continental (includes Leagues Cup)	Total
1	(United States) Pablo Mastroeni	2002–2013	225	19	0	1	245
2	(United States) Drew Moor	2009–2015 2019–2023	210	7	2	4	223
3	(United States) Chris Henderson	1996–1999 2001–2006	178	16	3	0	197
4	(United States) Keegan Rosenberry	2018–Present	168	2	4	11	179
5	(United States) Marcelo Balboa	1996–2002	151	12	5	0	168
6	(Jamaica) Omar Cummings	2007–2013	147	7	0	5	159
7	(United States) Kyle Beckerman	2002–2007	145	10	0	0	155
8	(United States) Marvell Wynne	2010–2014	140	8	2	3	153
9	(United States) Paul Bravo	1996–2002	135	12	4	0	151
10	(Scotland) Danny Wilson	2018–2023	136	2	4	5	147

=== Goals ===
As of March 21, 2026

Rank	Player	Years	MLS	Playoffs	US Open Cup	Continental (includes Leagues Cup)	Total
1	(United States) Conor Casey	2007–2012	50	2	1	0	53
2	(United States) Paul Bravo	1997–2001	39	5	1	1	46
3	(Scotland) John Spencer	2001–2004	37	2	4	0	43
4	(Jamaica) Omar Cummings	2007–2012	39	1	1	1	42
5	(Chile) Diego Rubio	2019–2023	38	0	1	1	40
6	(United States) Chris Henderson	1996–1998; 2002–2005	31	2	4	0	37
7	(Brazil) Rafael Navarro	2023-Present	31	0	0	5	36
8	(Senegal) Dominique Badji	2015–2018; 2021	28	0	3	0	31
9	(United States) Cole Bassett	2018-2025	31	0	0	0	31
10	(United States) Jonathan Lewis	2019–2025	26	0	3	1	30
