= Conor Casey =

American soccer coach and former player

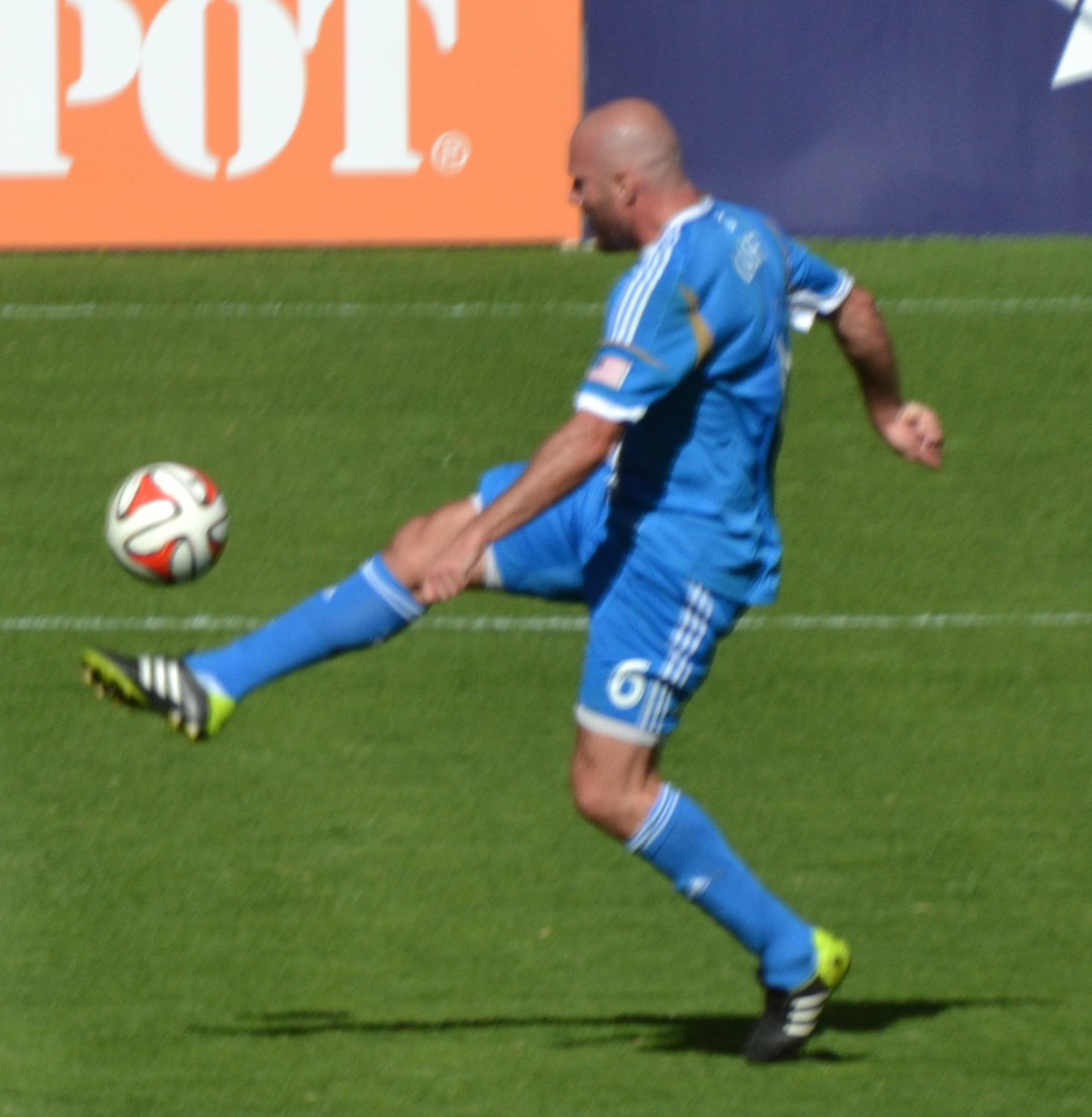
- Casey playing for the Philadelphia Union

Personal information
- Full name: Conor Patrick Casey
- Date of birth: July 25, 1981 (age 45)
- Place of birth: Dover, New Hampshire, U.S.
- Height: 6 ft 2 in (1.88 m)
- Position: Forward

College career
Years	Team	Apps	(Gls)
1999–2000	Portland Pilots	28	(31)

Senior career*
Years	Team	Apps	(Gls)
2000–2001	Borussia Dortmund II	23	(14)
2001–2004	Borussia Dortmund	0	(0)
2001–2003	→ Hannover 96 (loan)	23	(8)
2003–2004	→ Karlsruher SC (loan)	30	(14)
2004–2006	Mainz 05	40	(3)
2006	Mainz 05 II	2	(1)
2007	Toronto FC	2	(0)
2007–2012	Colorado Rapids	119	(50)
2013–2015	Philadelphia Union	70	(21)
2016	Columbus Crew SC	4	(0)
Total		313	(111)

International career
2001	United States U20	3	(0)
2000	United States U23	9	(0)
2004–2010	United States	19	(2)

Managerial career
- 2017–2019: Colorado Rapids (assistant)
- 2019: Colorado Rapids (interim)
- 2022: Charleston Battery
Medal record
Representing United States
FIFA Confederations Cup
Runner-up	2009 South Africa	Team
CONCACAF Gold Cup
Winner	CONCACAF Gold Cup	2005
Men's Soccer
Parent(s)	Terry Casey; Susan "Sue" Casey
- * Club domestic league appearances and goals

Conor Patrick Casey (born July 25, 1981) is an American former soccer player. He played for 16 seasons as a forward, finishing his career with Columbus Crew SC, before turning to coaching with his former club Colorado Rapids.

== Playing career ==
=== Youth and college ===
Casey was born in New Hampshire to Terry Casey and Susan "Sue" Berry Casey, an author and political aid. He moved to Colorado at age five, and considers Denver his hometown. He played soccer at Denver's South High School and went on to play two years of college soccer for the University of Portland from 1999 to 2000. In his first year at the University of Portland, Casey was named best player of the year. In 2000, he led the NCAA in scoring with twenty-three goals and seven assists.

=== Professional ===
After playing well in the 2000 Summer Olympics, Casey signed a four-year contract with German club Borussia Dortmund, spending his first year playing for their reserve team, Borussia Dortmund II. He was loaned out for the 2001–02 season to Hannover 96 in the second division, where he scored seven goals in nineteen games to help them earn promotion. He remained on loan with Hannover 96 for the 2002–03 Bundesliga season, but an injury-plagued campaign limited him to just four top-flight appearances and one goal. In 2003–04, he was again loaned to a second division club, Karlsruher SC, scoring fourteen goals in thirty games. In 2004, Casey signed with Bundesliga club Mainz 05, but scored only three goals and struggled with injuries during two and a half seasons with the club.

After being released by Mainz, Casey returned to America and signed with Major League Soccer. Casey was originally allocated to Toronto FC and after two games with no goals and no assists, he was traded to his hometown club, Colorado Rapids, on April 19, 2007, in exchange for Riley O'Neill and an undisclosed amount of allocation money.

He played 15 games with the Rapids in 2007, scoring two goals and three assists. In 2008, he scored 11 goals and two assists in 21 games. Casey ended the 2009 MLS season, with 16 goals, just one less than leader Jeff Cunningham to go along with one assist in 24 games. He was named in the MLS Best XI in 2009. In 2010, Casey became the all-time top goalscorer for the Colorado Rapids, recording thirteen goals and six assists in 27 games. Likewise in 2010, Casey was selected as the MVP for MLS Cup 2010, though the representative of the award sponsor announced "Casey Conor" when awarding it. In 2011, Casey suffered a season-ending Achilles tendon injury in a July 16 game against the Seattle Sounders FC as he finished that season with six goals and one assist in 14 games. In 2012, Casey scored two goals and three assists in 18 games. On November 16, 2012, Casey was released by the Colorado Rapids.

On December 14, 2012, Casey was selected by Philadelphia Union in the first round of the 2012 MLS Re-Entry Draft, Stage 2. On January 23, 2015, it was announced that Casey had signed a new contract with the club for the 2015 season.

After three seasons in Philadelphia, Casey signed with Columbus Crew SC on January 26, 2016. Casey received a direct red card for violent conduct just three minutes after coming into a match on June 1 against the Philadelphia Union. however, an independent panel rescinded his card and he was eligible to play the following game. After dealing with injuries throughout the year, he was only able to make four appearances for Columbus before announcing his retirement.

== International ==
Casey played at the 2001 World Youth Championship in Argentina and then graduated to the senior United States national team, getting his first cap on March 31, 2004, against Poland. On July 7, 2005, Casey suffered a tear to his ACL while playing against Cuba in the U.S.'s opening game of the Gold Cup. He served as a late sub for the United States during several matches in the 2009 Confederations Cup. Casey scored twice (his first ever Senior team goals) against Honduras in a critical world cup qualifier at San Pedro Sula, Honduras, on October 10, 2009. The unanimous Man of the Match, Casey scored the U.S.'s first two goals, and was fouled to set up the game-winning free-kick goal by Landon Donovan. The win put the United States through to the 2010 World Cup.

== Managerial career ==
On January 26, 2017, Casey was hired by Colorado Rapids as an assistant coach. On May 1, 2019, head coach Anthony Hudson was fired and Casey was promoted to interim head coach.

In December 2021, Casey was announced as the new head coach of the Charleston Battery in the USL Championship, becoming the sixth head coach in the club's history. Charleston and Casey mutually agreed to part ways on October 12, 2022, before the final match of the season after a dismal year of only six wins in 33 contests.

== Career statistics ==
=== Club ===
Club	Season	League			Cup (Note: Includes the DFB-Pokal and U.S. Open Cup)		Continental		Other (Note: All appearances in the MLS Cup Playoffs)		Total	
Club	Season	Division	Apps	Goals	Apps	Goals	Apps	Goals	Apps	Goals	Apps	Goals
Borussia Dortmund II	2000–01	Regionalliga Nord	10	2	–		–		–		10	2
Borussia Dortmund II	2001–02	Oberliga Westfalen	13	12	–		–		–		13	12
Borussia Dortmund II	Total		23	14	0	0	0	0	0	0	23	14
Borussia Dortmund	2001–02	Bundesliga	0	0	0	0	0	0	–		0	0
Borussia Dortmund	2002–03	Bundesliga	4	1	0	0	0	0	–		4	1
Borussia Dortmund	2003–04	Bundesliga	0	0	0	0	0	0	–		0	0
Borussia Dortmund	Total		4	1	0	0	0	0	0	0	4	1
Hannover 96 (loan)	2001–02	2. Bundesliga	19	7	1	0	–		–		20	7
Karlsruher SC (loan)	2003–04	2. Bundesliga	30	14	2	0	–		–		32	14
Mainz 05	2004–05	Bundesliga	28	2	2	2	–		–		30	4
Mainz 05	2005–06	Bundesliga	10	1	0	0	0	0	–		10	1
Mainz 05	2006–07	Bundesliga	2	0	0	0	–		–		2	0
Mainz 05	Total		40	3	2	2	0	0	0	0	42	5
Mainz 05 II	2006–07	Oberliga Südwest	2	1	–		–		–		2	1
Toronto FC	2007	MLS	2	0	–		–		–		2	0
Colorado Rapids	2007	MLS	15	2	2	0	–		–		17	2
Colorado Rapids	2008	MLS	21	11	1	1	–		–		22	12
Colorado Rapids	2009	MLS	24	16	0	0	–		–		24	16
Colorado Rapids	2010	MLS	27	13	0	0	–		4	2	31	15
Colorado Rapids	2011	MLS	14	6	0	0	0	0	0	0	14	6
Colorado Rapids	2012	MLS	18	2	0	0	–		–		18	2
Colorado Rapids	Total		119	50	3	1	0	0	4	2	126	53
Philadelphia Union	2013	MLS	31	10	2	0	–		–		33	10
Philadelphia Union	2014	MLS	25	8	3	1	–		–		28	9
Philadelphia Union	2015	MLS	14	3	2	0	–		–		16	3
Philadelphia Union	Total		70	21	7	1	0	0	0	0	77	22
Columbus Crew SC	2016	MLS	4	0	0	0	–		–		4	0
Career total			313	111	15	4	0	0	4	2	332	117

=== International ===
United States
Year	Apps	Goals
2004	6	0
2005	2	0
2006	0	0
2007	0	0
2008	1	0
2009	8	2
2010	2	0
Total	19	2

International goals
#	Date	Venue	Opponent	Score	Result	Competition
1.	October 10, 2009	Estadio Olímpico Metropolitano, San Pedro Sula, Honduras	Honduras	1–1	3–2	2010 FIFA World Cup Qualifying
2.	October 10, 2009	Estadio Olímpico Metropolitano, San Pedro Sula, Honduras	Honduras	2–1	3–2	2010 FIFA World Cup Qualifying

=== Managerial ===
As of December 20, 2021

Team	From	To	Record							
Team	From	To	G	W	D	L	GF	GA	GD	Win %
Colorado Rapids (interim)	May 1, 2019	August 25, 2019	19	7	5	7	33	32	+1	36.84
Charleston Battery	December 20, 2021	October 9, 2022	33	6	6	21	40	76	−36	18.18
Total			42	10	9	23	60	84	−24	23.81

== Honors ==
Colorado Rapids

- MLS Cup: 2010

United States

- CONCACAF Gold Cup: 2005

Individual

- MLS Cup Most Valuable Player: 2010
- MLS Best XI: 2009
- MLS All-Star: 2009, 2010

Records

- Colorado Rapids all-time top scorer: 53 goals
