= Steven Emory =

American soccer player

Personal information
- Full name: Steven Emory
- Date of birth: August 31, 1989 (age 37)
- Place of birth: Fort Collins, Colorado, United States
- Height: 6 ft 2 in (1.88 m)
- Position: Midfielder

Youth career
- 2007: Colorado Rapids
- 2007–2010: Metro State Roadrunners

Senior career*
Years	Team	Apps	(Gls)
2010	Real Colorado Foxes	13	(1)
2011	Colorado Rapids	0	(0)
2012	Kraft	26	(9)
2013	Real Colorado Foxes	3	(0)
2014	Kraft		
- * Club domestic league appearances and goals as of July 15, 2013

Steven Emory (born August 31, 1989, in Fort Collins, Colorado) is an American soccer player.

== Career ==
=== Youth, college and amateur ===
Emory began his career at Fort Collins High School in 2005 where he was named Second Team All-State pick in 2005, First Team All-State selection and First Team All-Front Range, and a Three-year letter winner. After spending the summer of 2007 with the Colorado Rapids youth system, Emory played four years of college soccer at Metropolitan State University of Denver where he scored 38 goals, and registered 23 assists in 85 games played, leading the Roadrunners to four winning seasons and two NCAA tournament appearances. He was awarded back to back player of the year awards. 2009 Daktronics second team All-America 2009 NSCAA first team All-Central Region 2009 Daktronics Central Region Player of the Year 2009 Daktronics first team All-Central Region 2009 RMAC All-Tournament 2009 RMAC Player of the year 2009 first team All-RMAC 2009 RMAC Offensive Player of the Week (Oct. 20) 2009 RMAC Preseason Player of the Year 2008 NSCAA first team All-West Region 2008 Daktronics second team All-Central Region 2008 second team All-RMAC 2008 RMAC All-Tournament

While in College, Emory also spent 2010 with the Real Colorado Foxes in the USL Premier Development League.

Emory was inducted into the Athletic Hall of Fame in 2019.

=== Professional ===
In January 2011, Emory was discovered by the Colorado Rapids and invited to preseason camp as a non-roster player. On March 2, 2011, Emory became the first Metro State student-athlete to sign a contract with a major professional team in any sport by signing with the Colorado Rapids of Major League Soccer.

Emory made his professional debut on March 30, 2011, in a Lamar Hunt US Open Cup game against Chicago Fire.

Emory's contract was released by Colorado on March 22 and picked up by Narpes Kraft in Finland in April, 2012.
