= Little Eye (band) =

Scottish pop/rock group

- Origin: Glasgow, Scotland
- Genres: Alternative rock, pop rock, power pop
- Years active: 2008– present
- Members: Allan Sieczkowski
- Past members: Euan Malloch; Jay Hepburn; Marcus Cordock
- Website: www.littleyeband.com

Little Eye is a Scottish pop/rock solo artist from Glasgow. The band is best known for the singles "Fighting the Future" and "Choked Up". The band also featured in the 2014 Isle of Wight Festival.

In November 2017, Little Eye announced that they would be splitting up 'due to creative differences'. Lead singer Allan Sieczkowski would carry on performing as a solo artist under the name 'Little Eye', while the other three band members are to work together to create a new project in 2018.

== History ==
Little Eye were formed in 2008 by Glasgow born front man Allan Sieczkowski. The band were the 2009 winners of the "Clyde 1 In Demand Band of the Year Award". They released their first album Fighting the Future on 8 June 2014. The band have filmed a variety of session music videos, from New York City to Loch Lomond. The band also covered songs such as Paramore's "Monster", which gained popularity on the video-sharing website YouTube. The band released the single "Fighting the Future" on 17 April 2014. The song received positive reviews and reached number 22 on the iTunes alternative chart. The band also toured schools across the central belt of Scotland, in which they played a variety of their own songs and cover songs.

== Members ==
- Allan Sieczkowski
- Jay Hepburn
- Euan Malloch

== Discography ==
=== Albums ===
- Fighting the Future (2014)

=== Singles ===
- "Choked Up" (2013)
- "Fighting the Future" (2014)
- "End Game" (2014)
- "Contagious" (2016)

== Awards ==
- Clyde 1 In Demand Band of the Year (2009)
- Young Scot Best Unsigned Band (2011)
