= 2011 Seattle Sounders FC season =

American soccer team season

Seattle Sounders FC
2011 season
- General manager: Adrian Hanauer
- Head coach: Sigi Schmid
- Stadium: CenturyLink Field (Qwest Field until June 23)
- Major League Soccer: Conference: 2nd Overall: 2nd
- MLS Cup playoffs: Conference semifinals
- U.S. Open Cup: Winners
- CONCACAF Champions League: Quarterfinals
- Top goalscorer: League: Fredy Montero (12); All: Fredy Montero (18)
- Highest home attendance: 64,140 (Oct. 15 vs. San Jose)
- Lowest home attendance: 35,940 (vs. Salt Lake (Sep. 10)
- Average home league attendance: 38,496
- Biggest win: League: 6–2 vs. Columbus (Aug. 27)
- Biggest defeat: League: 0–2 vs. Philadelphia (Oct. 8)
Home colors	Away colors	Third colors

The 2011 Seattle Sounders FC season was the club's third season in Major League Soccer, the United States' top-tier of professional soccer. It was the Sounders FC organization's third year of existence; including all previous clubs, it was the 31st season of a soccer team bearing the Sounders name.

== Background ==
The 2011 season is the third season for Seattle Sounders FC who began play in 2009 as the league's 15th team. In their inaugural season, Sounders FC became the second MLS expansion team in league history (Chicago was first) to win the U.S. Open Cup tournament in their first season. They did so by defeating D.C. United 2–1 on the road at RFK Stadium. In winning the U.S. Open Cup tournament, Sounders FC qualified for the preliminary round of the 2010–11 CONCACAF Champions League. During the preliminary round, they were paired up with the defending Primera División de Fútbol de El Salvador winners, Isidro Metapán. After winning the first leg by a score of 1–0, Seattle went to El Salvador to play the second.

== Review ==
=== November ===
On November 22, 2010, Seattle made a trade with the Colorado Rapids for defenders Julien Baudet of France and Danny Earls of the Republic of Ireland for Peter Vagenas. Also, the list of the ten protected players for the 2010 MLS Expansion Draft was decided by the club. The draft took place on November 24, 2010, when both the Portland Timbers and Vancouver Whitecaps FC selected ten players from the Major League Soccer teams, including Sanna Nyassi (who was later traded to Colorado) and Nathan Sturgis (who was later traded to Toronto) from Seattle Sounders FC. Vancouver later traded Jamaican international O'Brian White to Seattle.

=== December ===
On December 9, 2010, Swedish club, BK Häcken reported that midfielder, Erik Friberg completed a three-year deal with the Seattle Sounders FC, bringing him over to the team. They also have announced a contract extension with captain Kasey Keller. On December 15, 2010, the Sounders selected Chris Seitz of the Philadelphia Union in the 2010 MLS Re-Entry Draft. The goalkeeper was later traded to FC Dallas for a fourth round pick of the 2012 MLS SuperDraft. Defender Tyrone Marshall was also selected in the draft by the Colorado Rapids.

=== February ===
The team traveled to Casa Grande, Arizona, just like before the 2010 season for preseason training.

=== March ===
On March 9, 2011, the Seattle Sounders FC played the defending MLS Cup champions, Colorado Rapids in the second Seattle Sounders FC Community Shield. The game was at Qwest Field, now called CenturyLink Field.

The Sounders opened up the 2011 regular season against the defending Supporters' Shield titleholders, Los Angeles Galaxy at Qwest Field. It was the third-consecutive MLS season that the league had its opening game in Seattle. The match was held on March 15.

== Match results ==
Win Tie Loss

=== Preseason ===
February 4, 2011	Seattle Sounders FC	1–0	Vancouver Whitecaps FC	Casa Grande, Arizona
15:00 PST, 35' x 35' x 35' Training Game	Alonso (yellow card) 22'; Evans 63'	Match Report	Koffie (yellow card) 32'	Stadium: Grande Sports World; Attendance: +30

February 8, 2011	Seattle Sounders FC	3–3	Real Salt Lake	Casa Grande, Arizona
11:00 PST 45' x 35' x 30' Training Game	Neagle 3'; Carrasco (yellow card) 60'; Alonso (yellow card) 69'; White 90'; Montero 110' (pen.)	Match Report	Olave (yellow card) 29'; Grabavoy (yellow card) 32' (red card) 69'; Morales 36'; Araujo Jr. (yellow card) 76'; Warner 87' 88'	Stadium: Grande Sports World

February 10, 2011	Seattle Sounders FC	0–3	Columbus Crew	Phoenix, Arizona
10:00 PST 45' x 45' x 30' Training Game		Match Report	Mendoza 20'; Scott 106' (o.g.); Cunningham 108'	Stadium: Westside Soccer Complex; Referee: Alex Prus

February 12, 2011	Seattle Sounders FC	1–0	Chivas USA	Casa Grande, Arizona
9:30 PST Training Game	Wahl (yellow card) 30'; Estrada 75'	Match Report	Valentin (yellow card) 56'	Stadium: Grande Sports World; Attendance: 150+

February 21, 2011	Seattle Sounders FC	0–2	FC Dallas	Orlando, Florida
15:30 PST Training Game	Earls (yellow card) 26'; Carrasco (yellow card) 33'; Tetteh (yellow card) 70'	Match Report	Chávez 20'; Shea 27'; Jacobson (red card) 75'	Stadium: ESPN Complex; Attendance: 20+

February 22, 2011	Seattle Sounders FC	2–2	Houston Dynamo	Orlando, Florida
11:00 PST Training Game	Montero 62' (pen.); Tetteh 69'	Report	Weaver 11'; Ching 57'	Stadium: ESPN Complex

February 24, 2011	Seattle Sounders FC	7–0	UCF Knights	Bradenton, Florida
13:00 PST Training Game	Noonan 39' 43'; UCF Knights 57' (o.g.); White 59' 63'; Estrada 61'; Fucito 75'; Levesque (red card) 80'	Match Report	Robson (red card) 80'; Hunt (yellow card) 84'	Stadium: IMG Soccer Academy

February 26, 2011	Seattle Sounders FC	1–0	Chicago Fire	Bradenton, Florida
14:00 PST 45' x 45' x 30' Training Game	Rosales (yellow card) 55'; Montaño (yellow card) 72'; Carrasco 120'	Match Report	Gibbs (yellow card) 28' (red card) 55'	Stadium: IMG Soccer Academy

==== Cascadia Summit ====
March 4, 2011	Seattle Sounders FC	0–2	Portland Timbers	Tukwila, Washington
19:30 PDT	Alonso (yellow card) 5'; Hurtado (yellow card) 54'	Match Report	Perlaza 21'; Jewsbury (yellow card) 69'; Cooper 93+'	Stadium: Starfire Sports Complex; Attendance: 3,100; Referee: Dave Gantar

March 6, 2011	Seattle Sounders FC	2–3	Vancouver Whitecaps FC	Tukwila, Washington
15:00 PDT	Graham (yellow card) 10'; Levesque 45'; Montaño 77'	Report	Salgado 6'; Teibert 12'; Khalfan (yellow card) 18'; Camilo 47'; Cannon (yellow card) 81'	Stadium: Starfire Sports Complex; Attendance: 3,100

==== Seattle Sounders FC Community Shield ====
March 9, 2011	Seattle Sounders FC	3–1	Colorado Rapids	Seattle, Washington
19:00 PDT	González (yellow card) 57'; Hurtado 60'; Montero 67' 78'; Friberg (yellow card) 86'		Larentowicz 63' (pen.)	Stadium: Qwest Field; Attendance: 7355; Referee: Yader Reyes

=== MLS regular season ===
==== Table ====
Western Conference

Pos	Team	Pld	W	L	T	GF	GA	GD	Pts	Qualification
1	LA Galaxy	34	19	5	10	48	28	+20	67	Qualification for the conference semifinals
2	Seattle Sounders FC	34	18	7	9	56	37	+19	63	Qualification for the conference semifinals
3	Real Salt Lake	34	15	11	8	44	36	+8	53	Qualification for the conference semifinals
4	FC Dallas	34	15	12	7	42	39	+3	52	Qualification for the play-in round
5	Colorado Rapids	34	12	9	13	46	42	+4	49	Qualification for the play-in round
6	Portland Timbers	34	11	14	9	40	48	−8	42	
7	San Jose Earthquakes	34	8	12	14	40	45	−5	38	
8	Chivas USA	34	8	14	12	41	43	−2	36	
9	Vancouver Whitecaps FC	34	6	18	10	35	55	−20	28	

Source: MLS

League

Pos	Team	Pld	W	L	T	GF	GA	GD	Pts	
1	LA Galaxy (S, C)	34	19	5	10	48	28	+20	67	Qualification for the 2012–13 CONCACAF Champions League group stage
2	Seattle Sounders FC (U)	34	18	7	9	56	37	+19	63	Qualification for the 2012–13 CONCACAF Champions League group stage
3	Real Salt Lake	34	15	11	8	44	36	+8	53	Qualification for the 2012–13 CONCACAF Champions League group stage
4	FC Dallas	34	15	12	7	42	39	+3	52	
5	Sporting Kansas City	34	13	9	12	50	40	+10	51	
6	Houston Dynamo	34	12	9	13	45	41	+4	49	Qualification for the 2012–13 CONCACAF Champions League group stage
7	Colorado Rapids	34	12	9	13	44	41	+3	49	
8	Philadelphia Union	34	11	8	15	44	36	+8	48	
9	Columbus Crew	34	13	13	8	43	44	−1	47	
10	New York Red Bulls	34	10	8	16	50	44	+6	46	
11	Chicago Fire	34	9	9	16	46	45	+1	43	
12	Portland Timbers	34	11	14	9	40	48	−8	42	
13	D.C. United	34	9	13	12	49	52	−3	39	
14	San Jose Earthquakes	34	8	12	14	40	45	−5	38	
15	Chivas USA	34	8	14	12	41	43	−2	36	
16	Toronto FC (V)	34	6	13	15	36	59	−23	33	Qualification for the 2011–12 CONCACAF Champions League preliminary round
17	New England Revolution	34	5	16	13	38	58	−20	28	
18	Vancouver Whitecaps FC	34	6	18	10	35	55	−20	28	

Source: MLS
Rules for classification: 1) points; 2) head-to-head record; 3) goal difference; 4) number of goals scored
(C) MLS Cup champions; (S) Supporters' Shield winners; (U) U.S. Open Cup winners; (V) Canadian Championship winners

==== Results by round ====
Round	1	2	3	4	5	6	7	8	9	10	11	12	13	14	15	16	17	18	19	20	21	22	23	24	25	26	27	28	29	30	31	32	33	34
Stadium	H	A	H	A	H	A	A	H	A	A	H	H	H	A	A	H	A	H	H	A	A	H	A	A	H	A	H	H	H	A	A	H	H	A
Result	L	L	T	T	W	T	W	W	L	T	T	W	L	W	T	T	W	W	W	T	W	W	L	W	T	W	W	L	W	W	W	L	W	W
Conference	7	8	7	8	6	7	7	5	6	6	6	4	7	4	5	4	4	4	4	4	4	3	3	3	3	2	2	2	2	2	2	2	2	2
Overall	13	17	16	17	13	12	11	9	10	9	10	6	10	6	7	7	5	4	5	4	4	3	3	3	3	2	2	2	2	2	2	2	2	2

Updated to match(es) played on October 22, 2011. Source: 2011 Major League Soccer season
A = Away; H = Home; W = Win; L = Loss; T = Tie

==== Match results ====
Win Tie Loss

March 15, 2011 Match 1	Seattle Sounders FC	0–1	Los Angeles Galaxy	Seattle
18:30 PDT	Friberg (yellow card) 44'; González (yellow card) 46'	(Report)	Birchall (yellow card) 24'; Juninho 58'; Beckham (yellow card) 93'	Stadium: CenturyLink Field; Attendance: 36,443; Referee: Alex Prus

March 19, 2011 Match 2	New York Red Bulls	1–0	Seattle Sounders FC	Harrison, New Jersey
16:30 PDT	Agudelo 70'	(Report)	Hurtado (yellow card) 61'	Stadium: Red Bull Arena; Attendance: 20,982; Referee: Jair Marrufo

March 25, 2011 Match 3	Seattle Sounders FC	1–1	Houston Dynamo	Seattle
19:00 PDT	Ianni (yellow card) 43'; González (yellow card) 73'; Zakuani 80'	(Report)	Freeman (yellow card) 2'; Palmer (yellow card) 30'; Cameron 42'; Cameron (yellow card) 46'	Stadium: CenturyLink Field; Attendance: 36,204; Referee: Ramón Hernández

April 2, 2011 Match 4	San Jose Earthquakes	2–2	Seattle Sounders FC	Santa Clara, California
19:30 PDT	Leitch (yellow card) 6'; Dawkins 32'; Stephenson 52'	(Report)	Evans 18'; White 42'; Jaqua (yellow card) 71'; González (yellow card) 80'	Stadium: Buck Shaw Stadium; Attendance: 10,276; Referee: Edvin Jurisevic

April 9, 2011 Match 5	Seattle Sounders FC	2–1	Chicago Fire	Seattle
19:30 PDT	White 7'; Zakuani 25'; Riley (yellow card) 32'; Hurtado (yellow card) 47+'	(Report)	Chaves 8'; Robinson (yellow card) 71'	Stadium: CenturyLink Field; Attendance: 36,223; Referee: Hilario Grajeda

April 16, 2011 Match 6	Philadelphia Union	1–1	Seattle Sounders FC	Chester, Pennsylvania
16:00 EDT	Ruiz 32'; Miglioranzi (yellow card) 55'; Okugo (yellow card) 65'; Valdes (yellow card) 88'	(Report)	Alonso (yellow card) 30'; Fernández 91+'	Stadium: PPL Park; Attendance: 15,149; Referee: Terry Vaughn

April 22, 2011 Match 7	Colorado Rapids	0–1	Seattle Sounders FC	Commerce City, Colorado
19:30 MDT	Mullan (red card) 3'; Folan (yellow card) 75'	(Report)	Montero 19' (yellow card) 81'	Stadium: Dick's Sporting Goods Park; Attendance: 14,185; Referee: Silviu Petrescu

April 30, 2011 Match 8	Seattle Sounders FC	3–0	Toronto FC	Seattle
19:00 PDT	Fernández 9'; Alonso (yellow card) 45'; Evans 52' 75' (pen.)	(Report)	de Guzman (yellow card) 54'	Stadium: CenturyLink Field; Attendance: 36,287; Referee: Ricardo Salazar

May 4, 2011 Match 9	D.C. United	2–1	Seattle Sounders FC	Washington, D.C.
19:30 EDT	White (yellow card) 13'; Wolff 31'; Davies (yellow card) 35' (goal) 52'	(Report)	Jaqua (yellow card) 55'; Evans 71' (pen.)	Stadium: RFK Stadium; Attendance: 11,254; Referee: Hilario Grajeda

May 7, 2011 Match 10	Columbus Crew	1–1	Seattle Sounders FC	Columbus, Ohio
18:30 CDT	Rentería 67' (pen.); Miranda (yellow card) 75'	(Report)	Montero 7' (yellow card) 44'; Carrasco (yellow card) 38'; González (yellow card) 53'; Fernández (yellow card) 64'; Levesque (yellow card) 90'	Stadium: Columbus Crew Stadium; Attendance: 7,148; Referee: Mark Kadlecik

May 14, 2011 Match 11	Seattle Sounders FC	1–1	Portland Timbers	Seattle
20:00 PDT	Fernández 52'	(Report)	Danso 65'	Stadium: CenturyLink Field; Attendance: 36,593; Referee: Jair Marrufo

May 21, 2011 Match 12	Seattle Sounders FC	1–0	Sporting Kansas City	Seattle
19:00 PDT	Fernández (yellow card) 44'; Carrasco (yellow card) 51'; Rosales (yellow card) 64'; Alonso (yellow card) 84'; Parke 93'	(Report)	Smith (yellow card) 49'	Stadium: CenturyLink Field; Attendance: 36,098; Referee: Geoff Gamble

May 25, 2011 Match 13	Seattle Sounders FC	0–1	FC Dallas	Seattle
19:00 PDT	Scott (yellow card) 81'	(Report)	Shea 18'; John (yellow card) 44'	Stadium: CenturyLink Field; Attendance: 36,026; Referee: Baldomero Toledo

May 28, 2011 Match 14	Real Salt Lake	1–2	Seattle Sounders FC	Sandy, Utah
19:00 MDT	Johnson (yellow card) 28'; Olave (red card) 58'; Wingert (yellow card) 65'; Gonzalez 88'	(Report)	Ianni 71'; Riley (yellow card) 81'; Neagle 84'; Wahl (yellow card) 90'	Stadium: Rio Tinto Stadium; Attendance: 14,474; Referee: Mark Kadlecik

June 4, 2011 Match 15	Chicago Fire	0–0	Seattle Sounders FC	Bridgeview, Illinois
19:30 CDT	Chaves (yellow card) 46+'	(Report)	Fucito (yellow card) 33'; Wahl (yellow card) 36'	Stadium: Toyota Park; Attendance: 13,839; Referee: Terry Vaughn

June 11, 2011 Match 16	Seattle Sounders FC	2–2	Vancouver Whitecaps FC	Seattle
19:30 PDT	Rosales 81'; Alonso (yellow card) 47+' (goal) 84'	(Report)	Hassli 29' (pen.) 85'; Rochat (yellow card) 46+'; Camilo (yellow card) 55'; Leathers (yellow card) 71'	Stadium: CenturyLink Field; Attendance: 36,502; Referee: Mark Geiger

June 18, 2011 Match 17	Toronto FC	0–1	Seattle Sounders FC	Toronto, Ontario, Canada
19:00 EDT	Harden (yellow card) 18'; Borman (yellow card) 26'; Yourassowsky (yellow card) 65'; Cordon (yellow card) 93+'	(Report)	Hurtado (yellow card) 34' (yellow-red card) 49'; Montero 90'	Stadium: BMO Field; Attendance: 21,839; Referee: Yader Reyes

June 23, 2011 Match 18	Seattle Sounders FC	4–2	New York Red Bulls	Seattle
19:00 PDT	Friberg 11'; Alonso 12' (yellow card) 60'; Riley (yellow card) 52'; Levesque 67' 78'; González (yellow card) 90'	(Report)	Tainio (yellow card) 28'; Richards 31'; Da Luz (yellow card) 50'; Scott 58' (o.g.); De Rosario (yellow card) 93+'	Stadium: CenturyLink Field; Attendance: 46,065; Referee: Michael Kennedy

June 26, 2011 Match 19	Seattle Sounders FC	2–1	New England Revolution	Seattle
13:00 PDT	Carrasco (yellow card) 26'; Wahl 34' (yellow card) 87'; Fernández 40'	(Report)	Nyassi 3'; Phelan (yellow card) 23'; Cochrane (yellow card) 72'; Lekić (yellow card) 78'; Soares (yellow card) 90'	Stadium: CenturyLink Field; Attendance: 36,212; Referee: Geoff Gamble

July 4, 2011 Match 20	Los Angeles Galaxy	0–0	Seattle Sounders FC	Carson, California
19:30 PDT	Donovan (yellow card) 94+'	(Report)	Friberg (yellow card) 55'	Stadium: The Home Depot Center; Attendance: 27,000; Referee: Ricardo Salazar

July 10, 2011 Match 21	Portland Timbers	2–3	Seattle Sounders FC	Portland, Oregon
13:00 PDT	Parke 46' (o.g.); Marcelin (yellow card) 56'; Perlaza 69'; Brunner (red card) 81'	(Report)	Montero 57' (yellow card) 58' (goal) 74'; Alonso (yellow card) 63' (goal) 83' (pen.); Rosales (yellow card) 78'	Stadium: Jeld-Wen Field; Attendance: 18,627; Referee: Jorge Gonzalez

July 16, 2011 Match 22	Seattle Sounders FC	4–3	Colorado Rapids	Seattle
13:00 PDT	Fernández 7'; Montero (yellow card) 27' (goal) 82'; Levesque (yellow card) 69' (goal) 48'; Rosales 84'	(Report)	Thompson 1' (yellow card) 79'; Mastroeni (yellow card) 18'; Casey (yellow card) 25'; Larentowicz 42'; Folan 90'	Stadium: CenturyLink Field; Attendance: 36,424; Referee: Edvin Jurisevic

July 30, 2011 Match 23	Houston Dynamo	3–1	Seattle Sounders FC	Houston, Texas
19:30 CDT	Clark 7'; Ching 23' 71'; Weaver (yellow card) 34'; Davis (yellow card) 76'	(Report)	Fernández 36' (pen.) (yellow card) 38'; Fucito (yellow card) 87'	Stadium: Robertson Stadium; Attendance: 18,465; Referee: Niko Bratsis

August 6, 2011 Match 24	Sporting Kansas City	1–2	Seattle Sounders FC	Kansas City, Kansas
19:30 CDT	Kamara 20'; Diop (yellow card) 37'; Bravo (red card) 59'	(Report)	Rosales 90'; Neagle 92+'	Stadium: LIVESTRONG Sporting Park; Attendance: 17,493; Referee: Jair Marrufo

August 13, 2011 Match 25	Seattle Sounders FC	0–0	Chivas USA	Seattle
13:00 PDT	Wahl (yellow card) 23'; Friberg (yellow card) 89'	(Report)	LaBrocca (yellow card) 34'; Elliott (yellow card) 45'; Jazic (yellow card) 80'	Stadium: CenturyLink Field; Attendance: 36,364; Referee: Kevin Stott

August 20, 2011 Match 26	FC Dallas	0–1	Seattle Sounders FC	Frisco, Texas
20:00 CDT	Cruz (yellow card) 3' (yellow-red card) 56'; Ihemelu (yellow card) 27'	(Report)	Friberg (yellow card) 6'; Rosales 15'; Montero (yellow card) 60'; Hurtado (yellow card) 62'; Scott (yellow card) 94+'	Stadium: Pizza Hut Park; Attendance: 11,635; Referee: Dave Gantar

August 27, 2011 Match 27	Seattle Sounders FC	6–2	Columbus Crew	Seattle
13:00 PDT	Neagle 4' 21' 70'; Rosales 16' (pen.); Fucito 40'; Parke (yellow card) 73'; Gardner 74' (o.g.); Scott (yellow card) 81'	(Report)	Cunningham 59' (pen.); Burns (yellow card) 64'; Gardner 73'	Stadium: CenturyLink Field; Attendance: 36,364; Referee: Baldomero Toledo

September 10, 2011 Match 28	Seattle Sounders FC	1–2	Real Salt Lake	Seattle
13:00 PDT	Carrasco (yellow card) 38'; Hurtado (red card) 39'; Montero 47+'; Alonso (yellow card) 94+'	(Report)	Beltran (yellow card) 20' (yellow-red card) 35'; Keller 13' (o.g.); Saborio 56'; Williams (yellow card) 68'	Stadium: CenturyLink Field; Attendance: 35,940; Referee: Mark Kadlecik

September 17, 2011 Match 29	Seattle Sounders FC	3–0	D.C. United	Seattle
18:00 PDT	Fucito 35'; Wahl (yellow card) 41'; Fernández 47+' 60'	(Report)	Ngwenya (yellow card) 16' da Luz (yellow card) 63'	Stadium: CenturyLink Field; Attendance: 36,242; Referee: Kevin Stott

September 24, 2011 Match 30	Vancouver Whitecaps FC	1–3	Seattle Sounders FC	Vancouver, British Columbia Canada
19:30 PDT	Camilo 9'; DeMerit (yellow card) 32'; Hassli (yellow card) 70'	(Report)	Evans (yellow card) 31' (goal) 33' (pen.); Montero 64' 67'; Parke (yellow card) 77'	Stadium: Empire Field; Attendance: 21,000; Referee: Paul Ward

October 1, 2011 Match 31	New England Revolution	1–2	Seattle Sounders FC	Foxborough, Massachusetts
19:30 EDT	Fagundez 35'; Caraglio (yellow card) 84'	(Report)	Montero (yellow card) 28' (goal) 36' 48'	Stadium: Gillette Stadium; Attendance: 21,022; Referee: Geoff Gamble

October 8, 2011 Match 32	Seattle Sounders FC	0–2	Philadelphia Union	Seattle
19:00 PDT	Neagle (yellow card) 63'	(Report)	Adu 60'; Carroll 70'	Stadium: CenturyLink Field; Attendance: 36,304; Referee: Baldomero Toledo

October 15, 2011 Match 33	Seattle Sounders FC	2–1	San Jose Earthquakes	Seattle
19:30 PDT	Ianni (yellow card) 48'; Ochoa 82'; Montero 87'	(Report)	Morrow (yellow card) 6'; Wondolowski 24'; Ring (yellow card) 40'; Hernandez (yellow card) 57'	Stadium: CenturyLink Field; Attendance: 64,140; Referee: Michael Kennedy

October 22, 2011 Match 34	Chivas USA	1–3	Seattle Sounders FC	Carson, California
19:30 PDT	Zemanski (yellow card) 5'; Estupinan 83'	(Report)	Levesque (yellow card) 40'; Boyens 53' (o.g.); Fernández 68'; Ochoa 73'; Evans (yellow card) 78'	Stadium: The Home Depot Center; Attendance: 22,137; Referee: Ricardo Salazar

=== MLS Cup Playoffs ===
October 29, 2011 Conference; Semifinals	Real Salt Lake	3–0	Seattle Sounders FC	Sandy, Utah
7:00 pm PDT	Espindola (yellow card) 30'; Saborio 43', 53'; Grabavoy 88'	(Report)	Alonso (yellow card) 54'; Montero (yellow card) 90'; Friberg (yellow card) 90+3'	Stadium: Rio Tinto Stadium; Attendance: 17,067; Referee: Mark Geiger

November 2, 2011 Conference; Semifinals	Seattle Sounders FC	2–0 (2–3 agg.)	Real Salt Lake	Seattle, Washington
7:00 pm PDT	Alonso 56'; Neagle 61'	(Report)		Stadium: CenturyLink Field; Attendance: 36,021; Referee: Jair Marrufo

=== U.S. Open Cup ===
June 28, 2011 Third round	Seattle Sounders FC	2–1	Kitsap Pumas	Tukwila, Washington
7:00 pm PDT	Fucito 39' 62'	(Report)	Hyde (yellow card) 43'; Besagno 71'; Scott (yellow card) 80'	Stadium: Starfire Sports Complex; Attendance: 3,811; Referee: Tyler Ploeger

July 13, 2011 Quarterfinals	Seattle Sounders FC	3–1	Los Angeles Galaxy	Tukwila, Washington
7:00 pm PDT	Jaqua 4'; Alonso (yellow card) 22'; Montero 25' (yellow card) 54'; Parke (yellow card) 55'; Neagle 74'; Fucito (yellow card) 90'	(Report)	Cristman 40'; Cardozo (yellow card) 59'	Stadium: Starfire Sports Complex; Attendance: 4,322; Referee: Kevin Stott

August 30, 2011 Semifinals	Seattle Sounders FC	1–0	FC Dallas	Tukwila, Washington
7:00 pm PDT	González (yellow card) 35'; Montero 40'; Evans (yellow card) 58'	(Report)	Cruz (yellow card) 12'; Hernández (yellow card) 22'; Villar (yellow card) 63'; Santos (yellow card) 63'	Stadium: Starfire Sports Complex; Attendance: 4,593; Referee: Hilario Grajeda

October 4, 2011 Final	Seattle Sounders FC	2–0	Chicago Fire	Seattle, Washington
7:00 pm PDT	Montero 78' (yellow card) 90'; Alonso (yellow card) 90' (goal) 90+6'	(Report)	Nyarko (yellow card) 27'; Anibaba (yellow card) 90'	Stadium: CenturyLink Field; Attendance: 35,615; Referee: Alex Prus

=== CONCACAF Champions League ===
==== Preliminary round ====
July 26, 2011 First leg	San Francisco (Panama)	1–0	(United States) Seattle Sounders FC	Panama City, Panama
18:00 PDT	Brown (yellow card) 17' (goal) 28' (pen.); Panezo (yellow card) 73'	(Report)	Parke (yellow card) 26'; Alonso (yellow card) 70'; Fernández (yellow card) 78'	Stadium: Estadio Rommel Fernández; Attendance: 700; Referee: David España Rivas

August 3, 2011 Second leg	Seattle Sounders FC (United States)	2–0 (a.e.t.) (2–1 agg.)	(Panama) San Francisco	Seattle, Washington
19:00 PDT	Fernández 41'; Alonso (yellow card) 60'; Rosales (yellow card) 61'; Jaqua 98'; Friberg (yellow card) 110'; Keller (yellow card) 110'	(Report)	Brown (yellow card) 46+' de Avila (yellow card) 63'	Stadium: CenturyLink Field; Attendance: 21,233; Referee: Jeffrey Solis (Costa Rica)

==== Group stage ====
August 16, 2011 1	Seattle Sounders FC (United States)	4–1	(Guatemala) Comunicaciones	Seattle, United States
19:00 PDT	Ianni (yellow card) 16'; Evans 35'; Riley (yellow card) 47+'; González (yellow card) 54'; Neagle (red card) 55'; Fucito 61', 67'; Hurtado (yellow card) 69'; Gómez 87' (o.g.)	Report	Arreola 2'; Morales (yellow card) 9'; Castrillo (yellow card) 50'; Machado (yellow card) 60'; Ramirez (yellow card) 69'; Martinez (red card) 80'; Thompson (yellow card) 91+'	Stadium: CenturyLink Field; Attendance: 10,017; Referee: Paul Delgadillo (Mexico)

August 23, 2011 2	Monterrey (Mexico)	0–1	(United States) Seattle Sounders FC	Monterrey, Mexico
19:00 CDT		(Report)	Fernández 38'; Jaqua (yellow card) 47'	Stadium: Estadio Tecnológico; Attendance: 10,234; Referee: Elmar Rodas (Guatemala)

September 14, 2011 3	Herediano (Costa Rica)	1–2	(United States) Seattle Sounders FC	Heredia, Costa Rica
19:00CST	Cancela 46+' (pen.); Nunez (yellow card) 53'	(Report)	Montero 3', 54'; Scott (yellow card) 36'; Fernández (yellow card) 54'	Stadium: Estadio Eladio Rosabal Cordero; Referee: Jafeth Perea (Panama)

September 20, 2011 4	Seattle Sounders FC (United States)	0–1	(Costa Rica) Herediano	Seattle, United States
	Neagle (yellow card) 16'; Ianni (yellow card) 62'	Report	Arias 25' (yellow card) 58'; Cordero (yellow card) 35'; Barbosa (yellow card) 67'; Cambronero (yellow card) 77'	Stadium: CenturyLink Field; Attendance: 10,613

September 27, 2011 5	Comunicaciones (Guatemala)	2–2	(United States) Seattle Sounders FC	Guatemala City, Guatemala
	Montepeque 7'; R. Morales 63'; E. Morales (yellow card) 75'	(Report)	Alonso 44', 89'; Hurtado (yellow card) 87'	Stadium: Estadio Cementos Progreso; Referee: Roberto Garcia

October 18, 2011 6	Seattle Sounders FC (United States)	1–2	(Mexico) Monterrey	Seattle, United States
22:00	Montero 42'; Scott (yellow card) 58'	Report	Carreño 3'; Pérez (yellow card) 41'; Delgado 60'; Meza (yellow card) 75'; Suazo (yellow card) 81'; Morales (yellow card) 90'	Stadium: CenturyLink Field; Attendance: 15,866; Referee: Enrico Wijngaarde (Suriname)

Team	Pld	W	D	L	GF	GA	GD	Pts
(Mexico) Monterrey	6	4	0	2	11	4	+7	12
(United States) Seattle Sounders FC	6	3	1	2	10	7	+3	10
(Guatemala) Comunicaciones	6	2	1	3	8	13	−5	7
(Costa Rica) Herediano	6	2	0	4	6	11	−5	6

=== Friendlies ===
July 20, 2011	Seattle Sounders FC (United States)	0–7	(England) Manchester United	Seattle, Washington
			Owen 15'; Diouf 49'; Rooney 51' 69' 72'; Park 71'; Obertan 88'	Stadium: CenturyLink Field; Attendance: 67,052; Referee: Baldomero Toledo

== Statistics ==
=== Appearances and goals ===
Last updated on August 26, 2016.

No.	Pos	Nat	Player	Total		Regular season		Playoffs		U.S. Open Cup		Champions League	
No.	Pos	Nat	Player	Apps	Goals	Apps	Goals	Apps	Goals	Apps	Goals	Apps	Goals
2	FW	(United States) USA	Mike Fucito	29	6	13+6	2	1+1	0	2+2	2	2+2	2
3	MF	(United States) USA	Brad Evans	26	6	17+3	5	2	0	2	0	2	1
4	DF	(United States) USA	Patrick Ianni	22	1	12+4	1	0	0	1	0	4+1	0
5	DF	(United States) USA	Tyson Wahl	26	1	22+1	1	0	0	0	0	3	0
6	MF	(Cuba) CUB	Osvaldo Alonso	45	7	32+1	3	2	1	4	1	4+2	2
7	DF	(United States) USA	James Riley	38	0	29	0	1	0	1+1	0	5+1	0
8	MF	(Sweden) SWE	Erik Friberg	34	1	23+3	1	1+1	0	0+2	0	4	0
10	MF	(Argentina) ARG	Mauro Rosales	30	5	22+4	5	0	0	1	0	2+1	0
11	MF	(Democratic Republic of the Congo) COD	Steve Zakuani	6	2	6	2	0	0	0	0	0	0
12	DF	(Costa Rica) CRC	Leonardo González	26	0	12+2	0	2	0	4	0	5+1	0
13	FW	(Jamaica) JAM	O'Brian White	7	2	7	2	0	0	0	0	0	0
14	MF	(Ghana) GHA	Michael Tetteh	1	0	0	0	0	0	1	0	0	0
15	MF	(Uruguay) URU	Álvaro Fernández	40	11	23+6	9	2	0	3	0	5+1	2
16	MF	(United States) USA	David Estrada	6	0	1+3	0	0	0	1	0	1	0
17	MF	(Colombia) COL	Fredy Montero	42	18	27+3	12	2	0	3	3	6+1	3
18	GK	(United States) USA	Kasey Keller	43	0	34	0	2	0	2	0	5	0
19	FW	(United States) USA	Sammy Ochoa	9	2	0+4	2	1+1	0	0	0	1+2	0
20	DF	(United States) USA	Zach Scott	23	0	9+3	0	1	0	3	0	6+1	0
21	FW	(United States) USA	Nate Jaqua	30	2	7+16	0	0	0	2	1	3+2	1
22	MF	(United States) USA	Mike Seamon	1	0	0	0	0	0	1	0	0	0
23	MF	(United States) USA	Servando Carrasco	19	0	7+5	0	0	0	0+1	0	4+2	0
24	FW	(United States) USA	Roger Levesque	29	3	9+10	3	0+2	0	0+2	0	5+1	0
25	FW	(United States) USA	Pat Noonan	17	0	2+7	0	0	0	2+1	0	3+2	0
26	GK	(Puerto Rico) PUR	Taylor Graham	1	0	0	0	0	0	1	0	0	0
27	MF	(United States) USA	Lamar Neagle	35	7	9+14	5	1+1	1	2+1	1	5+2	0
28	GK	(Puerto Rico) PUR	Terry Boss	4	0	0	0	0	0	2	0	2	0
29	GK	(United States) USA	Josh Ford	0	0	0	0	0	0	0	0	0	0
30	MF	(The Gambia) GAM	Amadou Sanyang	4	0	0+1	0	0	0	0	0	1+2	0
31	DF	(United States) USA	Jeff Parke	39	1	28	1	2	0	3+1	0	5	0
34	DF	(Colombia) COL	Jhon Kennedy Hurtado	31	0	23	0	2	0	2	0	4	0
35	GK	(United States) USA	Bryan Meredith	1	0	0	0	0	0	0	0	1	0
Players out on loan:
32	MF	(Colombia) COL	Miguel Montaño (on loan to Montreal Impact)	3	0	0+2	0	0	0	1	0	0	0

== Squads ==
=== First Team squad ===
Updated August 27, 2011.

No.	Name	Nationality	Position (s)	Date of birth (age)	Signed From
Goalkeepers
18	Kasey Keller (C)	(United States)	GK	November 29, 1969 (age 56)	(England) Fulham
28	Terry Boss	(Puerto Rico)	GK	September 1, 1981 (age 45)	(United States) New York
29	Josh Ford	(United States)	GK	November 6, 1987 (age 39)	(United States) UConn
35	Bryan Meredith	(United States)	GK	August 2, 1989 (age 37)	(United States) Kitsap Pumas
Defenders
4	Patrick Ianni	(United States)	CB	June 15, 1985 (age 41)	(United States) Houston
5	Tyson Wahl	(United States)	LFB	February 23, 1984 (age 42)	(United States) Kansas City
7	James Riley	(United States)	RFB	October 27, 1982 (age 44)	(United States) San Jose
12	Leonardo González	(Costa Rica)	LFB	November 21, 1980 (age 45)	(Costa Rica) Municipal Liberia
20	Zach Scott	(United States)	CB / RFB	July 2, 1980 (age 46)	(United States) Seattle (USL)
26	Taylor Graham	(Puerto Rico)	CB	June 3, 1980 (age 46)	(United States) Seattle (USL)
31	Jeff Parke	(United States)	CB	April 13, 1982 (age 44)	(Canada) Vancouver
34	Jhon Kennedy Hurtado	(Colombia)	CB	May 16, 1984 (age 42)	(Colombia) Deportivo Cali
Midfielders
3	Brad Evans	(United States)	CM / RM	May 20, 1985 (age 41)	(United States) Columbus
6	Osvaldo Alonso	(Cuba)	DM	November 11, 1985 (age 40)	(United States) Charleston
8	Erik Friberg	(Sweden)	CM / RM	February 10, 1986 (age 40)	(Sweden) Häcken
10	Mauro Rosales	(Argentina)	AM / RM	February 24, 1981 (age 45)	(Argentina) River Plate
11	Steve Zakuani	(Democratic Republic of the Congo)	LM	February 9, 1988 (age 38)	(United States) Akron
14	Michael Tetteh	(Ghana)	LM	January 16, 1989 (age 37)	(United States) UC Santa Barbara
15	Álvaro Fernández	(Uruguay)	LM	October 11, 1985 (age 41)	(Uruguay) Nacional
16	David Estrada	(United States)	RM	February 4, 1988 (age 38)	(United States) UCLA
22	Mike Seamon	(United States)	CM	August 30, 1988 (age 38)	(United States) Villanova
23	Servando Carrasco	(United States)	CM / RM	August 13, 1988 (age 38)	(United States) California Golden Bears
27	Lamar Neagle	(United States)	LM	May 7, 1987 (age 39)	(Finland) IFK Mariehamn
30	Amadou Sanyang	(The Gambia)	CM / RM	August 1, 1991 (age 35)	(Canada) Toronto
32	Miguel Montaño (on loan to Montreal)	(Colombia)	AM / LM	June 25, 1991 (age 35)	(Argentina) Quilmes
Forwards
2	Mike Fucito	(United States)	ST	April 29, 1986 (age 40)	(United States) Harvard
13	O'Brian White	(Jamaica)	CF / ST	December 14, 1985 (age 40)	(Canada) Vancouver
17	Fredy Montero	(Colombia)	ST	July 26, 1987 (age 39)	(Colombia) Deportivo Cali
19	Sammy Ochoa	(United States)	ST	September 4, 1986 (age 40)	(Mexico) Estudiantes Tecos
21	Nate Jaqua	(United States)	ST	October 28, 1981 (age 45)	(United States) Houston
24	Roger Levesque	(United States)	ST	January 22, 1981 (age 45)	(United States) Seattle (USL)
25	Pat Noonan	(United States)	ST	August 2, 1980 (age 46)	(United States) Colorado

=== Major League Soccer squad ===
Updated September 12, 2011. Note: Flags indicate national team as defined under FIFA eligibility rules; some limited exceptions apply. Players may hold more than one non-FIFA nationality.

No.	Pos.	Nation	Player
2	FW	USA	Mike Fucito
3	MF	USA	Brad Evans
4	DF	USA	Patrick Ianni
5	DF	USA	Tyson Wahl
6	MF	CUB	Osvaldo Alonso
7	DF	USA	James Riley
8	MF	SWE	Erik Friberg
10	MF	ARG	Mauro Rosales
11	MF	COD	Steve Zakuani
12	DF	CRC	Leonardo González
13	FW	JAM	O'Brian White
14	MF	GHA	Michael Tetteh
15	MF	URU	Álvaro Fernández
16	MF	USA	David Estrada
17	FW	COL	Fredy Montero
18	GK	USA	Kasey Keller (captain)

No.	Pos.	Nation	Player
19	FW	USA	Sammy Ochoa
20	DF	USA	Zach Scott (vice-captain)
21	FW	USA	Nate Jaqua
22	MF	USA	Mike Seamon
23	MF	USA	Servando Carrasco
24	FW	USA	Roger Levesque
25	FW	USA	Pat Noonan
26	DF	USA	Taylor Graham
27	MF	USA	Lamar Neagle
28	GK	PUR	Terry Boss
29	GK	USA	Josh Ford
30	MF	GAM	Amadou Sanyang
31	DF	USA	Jeff Parke
32	MF	COL	Miguel Montaño (on loan to Montreal)
34	DF	COL	Jhon Kennedy Hurtado
35	GK	USA	Bryan Meredith

== Transfers ==
=== In ===
Date	Player	Position	Previous club	Fee/notes	Ref
November 22, 2010	(France) Julien Baudet	DF	(United States) Colorado Rapids	Acquired for Peter Vagenas	
November 22, 2010	(Republic of Ireland) Danny Earls	DF	(United States) Colorado Rapids	Acquired for Peter Vagenas	
November 24, 2010	(Jamaica) O'Brian White	FW	(Canada) Vancouver Whitecaps FC	Acquired for allocation money	
December 15, 2010	(United States) Chris Seitz	GK	(United States) Philadelphia Union	Re-Entry Draft, subsequently traded	
December 16, 2010	(Sweden) Erik Friberg	MF	(Sweden) Häcken	Undisclosed	
March 2, 2011	(United States) Lamar Neagle	FW	(Finland) IFK Mariehamn	Free	
March 18, 2011	(Argentina) Mauro Rosales	MF	(Argentina) River Plate	Undisclosed	
July 30, 2011	(The Gambia) Amadou Sanyang	MF	(Canada) Toronto FC	Free	
August 26, 2011	(United States) Sammy Ochoa	FW	(Mexico) Estudiantes Tecos	Acquired thru allocation process	
September 12, 2011	(United States) Bryan Meredith	GK	(United States) Kitsap Pumas	Free	

=== Out ===
Date	Player	Position	Destination club	Fee/notes	Ref
November 22, 2010	(United States) Peter Vagenas	MF	(United States) Colorado Rapids	Traded for Julien Baudet and Danny Earls	
November 24, 2010	(The Gambia) Sanna Nyassi	MF	(Canada) Vancouver Whitecaps FC	Expansion Draft	
November 24, 2010	(United States) Nathan Sturgis	MF	(Canada) Vancouver Whitecaps FC	Expansion Draft	
December 15, 2010	(Jamaica) Tyrone Marshall	DF	(United States) Colorado Rapids	Re-Entry Draft	
December 15, 2010	(United States) Chris Seitz	GK	(United States) FC Dallas	Traded for a 2012 4th round SuperDraft pick	
March 1, 2011	(Republic of Ireland) Danny Earls	DF	(United States) Colorado Rapids	Waived, free transfer	
March 15, 2011	(Switzerland) Blaise Nkufo	FW	None	Released, then retired	

=== Loan out ===
Date from	Date to	Name	Position	Destination club	Fee/notes	Ref
June 29, 2011	July 10, 2011	(Ghana) Michael Tetteh	MF	(United States) Orlando City S.C.	10-day loan deal	
August 15, 2011	End of season	(Colombia) Miguel Montaño	FW	(Canada) Montreal Impact	End of season loan deal	

== Club ==
=== Coaching staff ===
Position	Staff
General Manager	(United States) Adrian Hanauer
Head coach	(Germany) Sigi Schmid
Assistant coach	(United States) Brian Schmetzer
Assistant coach	(Saint Vincent and the Grenadines) Ezra Hendrickson
Goalkeeper coach	(United States) Tom Dutra
Fitness coach	(United States) David Tenney
Chief scout	(United States) Kurt Schmid
Technical director	(United States) Chris Henderson

Updated to match played November 18, 2010
Source: Seattle Sounders FC

=== Management ===
Majority Owner	(United States) Joe Roth
Owners	(United States) Paul G. Allen (United States) Drew Carey (United States) Adrian Hanauer
Chief Executive Officer	(United States) Jo Lynn Allen
Senior Vice President & Chief Financial Officer	(United States) Karen Harrison
President	(United States) Peter McLoughlin
Senior Vice President of Business Operations	(United States) Gary Wright
Ground (capacity and dimensions)	CenturyLink Field (35,700 / 104.2x67.7 meters)

Updated to match played November 18, 2010
Source: Seattle Sounders FC

=== Official sponsors ===
- (United States) Xbox 360
- (Germany) Adidas
- (South Korea) Samsung Mob!le
- (United States) Seattle Bank
- (United States) Virginia Mason Medical Center

Source: Soundersfc.com

=== Kits ===
Home	Home Alternate	Home Alt. 2	Away	Away Alternate	Third

Type	Shirt	Shorts	Socks	First appearance / Info
Home	Rave Green	Blue	Rave Green	
Home Alt.	Rave Green	Rave Green	Blue	MLS, March 19 against New York
Home Alt. 2	Rave Green	Rave Green	Rave Green	MLS, April 16 against Philadelphia
Away	Shale	Shale	Shale	
Away Alt.	Shale	Shale	Rave Green	CCL, Group stage, September 27 against Comunicaciones
Third	Yellow	Yellow	Yellow	

== Recognition ==
MLS Player of the Week

Week	Player	Opponent	Link
10	(United States) Jeff Parke	Sporting Kansas City	Player of the Week
17	(Colombia) Fredy Montero	Portland Timbers	Player of the Week
18	(Argentina) Mauro Rosales	Colorado Rapids	Player of the Week
24	(United States) Lamar Neagle	Columbus Crew	Player of the Week
30/31	(United States) Kasey Keller	San Jose Earthquakes	Player of the Week

MLS Goal of the Week

Week	Player	Opponent	Link
4	(Jamaica) O'Brian White	Chicago Fire	Goal Week 4
11	(United States) Lamar Neagle	Real Salt Lake	Goal Week 11
14	(Colombia) Fredy Montero	Toronto FC	Goal Week 14
15	(United States) Tyson Wahl	New England Revolution	Goal Week 15
24	(United States) Lamar Neagle	Columbus Crew	Goal Week 24
27	(Uruguay) Álvaro Fernández	D.C. United	Goal Week 27
28	(Colombia) Fredy Montero	Vancouver Whitecaps FC	Goal Week 28

MLS Save of the Week

Week	Player	Opponent	Link
3	(United States) Kasey Keller	San Jose Earthquakes	Save of the Week
4	(United States) Kasey Keller	Chicago Fire	Save of the Week
12	(United States) Kasey Keller	Chicago Fire	Save of the Week
23	(United States) Kasey Keller	F.C. Dallas	Save of the Week
30	(United States) Kasey Keller	Philadelphia Union	Save of the Week
31	(United States) Kasey Keller	San Jose Earthquakes	Save of the Week

MLS W.O.R.K.S. Humanitarian of the Month

Month	Player	Link
March	(Colombia) Fredy Montero	March Humanitarian of the Month

== Miscellany ==
=== Stadium ===
On June 23, 2011, after the completion of CenturyLink's acquisition of Qwest, Qwest Field was renamed CenturyLink Field. CenturyLink picked up the five-year extension in the naming rights contract at that time, extending the contract to June 2019.

=== Allocation ranking ===
Seattle is in the No. 18 position in the MLS Allocation Ranking. The allocation ranking is the mechanism used to determine which MLS club has first priority to acquire a U.S. National Team player who signs with MLS after playing abroad, or a former MLS player who returns to the league after having gone to a club abroad for a transfer fee. Seattle started 2011 ranked No. 11 on the allocation list but on August 26 traded allocation positions with Chicago Fire to acquire Sammy Ochoa.

=== International roster spots ===
Seattle has 7 international roster spots. Each club in Major League Soccer is allocated 8 international roster spots, which can be traded. Seattle dealt one slot to Portland Timbers on January 14, 2011, for use in the 2011 season. There is no limit on the number of international slots on each club's roster. The remaining roster slots must belong to domestic players. For clubs based in the United States, a domestic player is either a U.S. citizen, a permanent resident (green card holder) or the holder of other special status (e.g., refugee or asylum status).

=== Future draft pick trades ===
Future picks acquired: 2012 SuperDraft Round 4 pick acquired from FC Dallas.
Future picks traded: 2012 SuperDraft Round 3 pick traded to Chicago Fire.
