= Seattle Sounders FC Community Shield =

Tournament details
- Host country: United States
- Teams: 2 (from 1 confederation)
- Venue: 1 (in 1 host city)

Final positions
- Champions: (Washington (state)) Seattle Sounders FC (2nd title)
- Runners-up: (Mexico) Chiapas

Tournament statistics
- Matches played: 3
- Goals scored: 7 (2.33 per match)
- Top scorer: Fredy Montero (4 goals)

The Seattle Sounders FC Community Shield was a club soccer match hosted and organized by the Seattle Sounders FC of Major League Soccer (MLS). The preseason exhibition match was contested by the Sounders and a selected club to raise money for local charities in the Seattle area. In 2010, the Sounders raised $82,000 and the money was split between the Boys & Girls Clubs of America of Washington, Seattle SCORES, Soccer Saves, and Washington Youth Soccer.

In 2010, the first Community Shield was held, when the Sounders played their longtime rivals, the Portland Timbers on March 11, 2010. In the match, the Timbers defeated the Sounders 1–0, giving the Timbers their first win in Seattle since 2005.

On March 9, 2011, Sounders and the defending 2010 MLS Cup champions, the Colorado Rapids took the pitch in the 2nd Community Shield with the Sounders winning 3–1.

February 29, 2012, Sounders took on Jaguares from the Mexican Primera División at CenturyLink Field and won 2–0, with two goals from Fredy Montero.

== History ==
Seattle and Portland have one of the biggest rivalries in American sports. In July 2009, Seattle and Portland met in the 2009 Lamar Hunt U.S. Open Cup at PGE Park in Portland, Oregon. Seattle won the game 2-1 from a goal by Roger Levesque in the first minute. The Seattle Sounders – Portland Timbers rivalry started in the North American Soccer League in 1975.

== Matches ==
=== 2010 Community Shield ===
Elias Bazakos was the referee for the first game. A total of 18,606 people attended the game. Ryan Pore, a former tryalist for the Sounders, gave an assist to O. J. Obatola, a Portland tryalist from Gombak United FC of the Singaporean S. League. Only one card was given during the match, to James Marcelin who plays in the Haiti national football team. The money raised from the game was $82,000. The money will be split among the Boys & Girls Clubs of America of Washington state, Seattle SCORES, Soccer Saves, and Washington Youth Soccer.

March 11, 2010	Seattle Sounders FC (United States)	0–1	(United States) Portland Timbers	Seattle, Washington USA
18:00 PDT		Report	Obatola 44'; Marcelin (yellow card) 70'	Stadium: Qwest Field; Attendance: 18,606; Referee: Elias Bazakos

=== 2011 Community Shield ===
The second match was watched by 7,355 people at Qwest Field. Jhon Kennedy Hurtado scored the first goal off a Fredy Montero free-kick to give Seattle a 1-0 lead. Colorado responded with a goal from the penalty spot by Jeff Larentowicz. But Fredy Montero scored two goals to claim the victory for the Sounders.

March 9, 2011	Seattle Sounders FC (United States)	3–1	(United States) Colorado Rapids	Seattle, Washington USA
18:00 PDT	González (yellow card) 57'; Hurtado 60'; Montero 67' 78'; Friberg (yellow card) 86'	Report	Larentowicz 63' (pen.)	Stadium: Qwest Field; Attendance: 7,355; Referee: Yader Reyes

=== 2012 Community Shield ===
11,140 people were in attendance. Fredy Montero scored the first goal off a header in the 61' minute to give Seattle a 1-0 lead. Chiapas was never able to break through. Later on in the 73' minute Fredy Montero scored another goal, securing the victory for the Sounders.

February 29, 2012	Seattle Sounders FC (United States)	2–0	(Mexico) Chiapas	Seattle, Washington USA
19:00 PST	Montero 61', 73'; Alonso (yellow card) 76'	Match Report	Martínez (yellow card) 73'	Stadium: CenturyLink Field; Attendance: 11,140

== Top goalscorers ==
Rank	Scorer	Club	Goals
1	(Colombia) Fredy Montero	Seattle Sounders FC	4
2	(Colombia) Jhon Kennedy Hurtado	Seattle Sounders FC	1
2	(United States) Jeff Larentowicz	Colorado Rapids	1
2	(Nigeria) O. J. Obatola	Portland Timbers	1
