= 2010 MLS All-Star Game =

Soccer game played in Houston, Texas

AT&T MLS All-Star Game 2010
- Event: 2010 Major League Soccer season
MLS All-Stars	Manchester United
(United States) (Canada)	(England)
2	5
- Date: July 28, 2010
- Venue: Reliant Stadium, Houston, Texas
- Most Valuable Player: Federico Macheda (Manchester United)
- Referee: Jorge Gonzalez
- Attendance: 70,728

The 2010 Major League Soccer All-Star Game, held on July 28, 2010, was the 15th annual Major League Soccer All-Star Game, a soccer match involving all-stars from Major League Soccer. The MLS All-Stars faced Manchester United of the English Premier League in the seventh All-Star Game that featured the league's best players facing international competition. The match was broadcast in the US on ESPN2 in English and Galavision in Spanish.

Manchester United thrashed the MLS All-Stars 5–2 to become the first international club to defeat the All-Stars in regulation time (fellow Premier League side Everton won the 2009 All-Star Game on penalties). United forward Federico Macheda, who scored the game's first two goals, was named Most Valuable Player.

Houston Dynamo and MLS announced Reliant Stadium as the venue on September 8, 2009. MLS Commissioner Don Garber speculated the league might have drawn a team from Mexico to play the MLS All-Stars in 2010, given the close proximity of the country to Houston.

== Host venue ==
MLS Commissioner Don Garber announced on July 27, 2009 that Houston had been chosen as the host city for the upcoming 2010 MLS All-Star Game, in a press conference at the Canyons Resort in Park City, Utah during All-Star Week festivities. The 2010 MLS All-Star game was the first to be played in the state of Texas.

== MLS All-Stars voting ==
Like the previous year, the selection of the MLS All-Star First XI was determined by an online fan voting system that accounted for 25% of the total vote, with players, coaches and general managers, and the media each holding 25% of the vote. The fan voting period was announced after the start of the 2010 Major League Soccer season. An additional seven players were chosen by the MLS All-Star head coach Bruce Arena and the Commissioner of MLS Don Garber.

== Inactive Roster ==
In addition to the 25-man roster of players available to participate in the match, MLS also announced 7 additional inactive all-stars: goalkeepers Jimmy Nielsen (Kansas City) and Kasey Keller (Seattle), midfielders Joel Lindpere (New York), Robbie Rogers (Columbus), Freddie Ljungberg (Seattle), and forwards Fredy Montero (Seattle) and Conor Casey (Colorado).

== 2010 MLS All-Star Game Rosters ==
=== Major League Soccer ===
The 2010 MLS All-Star First XI was announced on Tuesday, July 13, 2010, but midfielder Kyle Beckerman was forced to withdraw from the squad due to injury. A further 13 players were added to the roster on July 19.

Players in bold denotes First XI status.

Note: Flags indicate national team as defined under FIFA eligibility rules; some limited exceptions apply. Players may hold more than one non-FIFA nationality.

No.	Pos.	Nation	Player
1	GK	JAM	**Donovan Ricketts** (LA Galaxy)
2	MF	USA	Jeff Larentowicz (Colorado Rapids)
3	DF	COL	**Jámison Olave** (Real Salt Lake)
4	DF	USA	**Omar Gonzalez** (LA Galaxy)
5	MF	USA	**Kyle Beckerman** (Real Salt Lake, injured)
6	DF	USA	Heath Pearce (FC Dallas)
7	MF	ARG	**Guillermo Barros Schelotto** (Columbus Crew)
8	DF	USA	**Chad Marshall** (Columbus Crew)
9	FW	COL	Juan Pablo Ángel (New York Red Bulls)
10	FW	USA	**Landon Donovan** (LA Galaxy)
11	MF	ARG	**Javier Morales** (Real Salt Lake)
13	DF	USA	Jonathan Bornstein (Chivas USA, injured)
14	FW	USA	**Edson Buddle** (LA Galaxy)

No.	Pos.	Nation	Player
15	MF	USA	Bobby Convey (San Jose Earthquakes)
16	MF	GUA	**Marco Pappa** (Chicago Fire)
17	MF	CAN	**Dwayne De Rosario** (Toronto FC)
18	GK	USA	Nick Rimando (Real Salt Lake)
19	MF	FRA	Sébastien Le Toux (Philadelphia Union)
20	MF	COL	David Ferreira (FC Dallas)
21	MF	GRN	Shalrie Joseph (New England Revolution)
22	DF	COL	Wilman Conde (Chicago Fire)
24	MF	USA	Brad Davis (Houston Dynamo)
25	FW	USA	Brian Ching (Houston Dynamo)
30	DF	USA	Kevin Alston (New England Revolution)
99	FW	BOL	Jaime Moreno (D.C. United)

=== Manchester United ===
Manchester United announced their squad on July 9, 2010.

Note: Flags indicate national team as defined under FIFA eligibility rules; some limited exceptions apply. Players may hold more than one non-FIFA nationality.

No.	Pos.	Nation	Player
1	GK	NED	Edwin van der Sar
6	DF	ENG	Wes Brown
9	FW	BUL	Dimitar Berbatov
11	MF	WAL	Ryan Giggs
12	DF	ENG	Chris Smalling
13	MF	KOR	Park Ji-sung
14	FW	MEX	Javier Hernández
17	MF	POR	Nani
18	MF	ENG	Paul Scholes
19	FW	ENG	Danny Welbeck
20	DF	BRA	Fabio
21	DF	BRA	Rafael

No.	Pos.	Nation	Player
22	DF	IRL	John O'Shea
23	DF	NIR	Jonny Evans
24	MF	SCO	Darren Fletcher
26	FW	FRA	Gabriel Obertan
27	FW	ITA	Federico Macheda
28	MF	IRL	Darron Gibson
29	GK	POL	Tomasz Kuszczak
30	DF	BEL	Ritchie De Laet
31	MF	NIR	Corry Evans
32	FW	SEN	Mame Biram Diouf
35	MF	ENG	Tom Cleverley
40	GK	ENG	Ben Amos

== Match details ==
July 28, 2010
8:00 p.m. CDT

MLS All-Stars (United States) (Canada)	2–5	(England) Manchester United
Ching 64'; De Rosario 90'	Report	Macheda 1', 12'; Gibson 70'; Cleverley 73'; Hernández 84'

Reliant Stadium, Houston, Texas
Attendance: 70,728
Referee: Jorge Gonzalez

MLS All-Stars	Manchester United

GK	1	(Jamaica) Donovan Ricketts		(substituted off) 45'
RB	30	(United States) Kevin Alston		(substituted off) 74'
CB	3	(Colombia) Jámison Olave		(substituted off) 45'
CB	8	(United States) Chad Marshall		(substituted off) 63'
LB	6	(United States) Heath Pearce		(substituted off) 74'
RM	19	(France) Sébastien Le Toux		(substituted off) 45'
CM	11	(Argentina) Javier Morales		(substituted off) 63'
CM	21	(Grenada) Shalrie Joseph		(substituted off) 74'
CM	7	(Argentina) Guillermo Barros Schelotto		(substituted off) 45'
LM	16	(Guatemala) Marco Pappa		(substituted off) 45'
CF	9	(Colombia) Juan Pablo Ángel (c)		(substituted off) 45'
Substitutes:
GK	18	(United States) Nick Rimando		(substituted on) 45'
DF	4	(United States) Omar Gonzalez		(substituted on) 45'
DF	22	(Colombia) Wilman Conde	(yellow card) 69'	(substituted on) 63'
MF	2	(United States) Jeff Larentowicz		(substituted on) 45'
MF	15	(United States) Bobby Convey		(substituted on) 45'
MF	17	(Canada) Dwayne De Rosario		(substituted on) 74'
MF	20	(Colombia) David Ferreira		(substituted on) 45'
MF	24	(United States) Brad Davis		(substituted on) 74'
FW	10	(United States) Landon Donovan		(substituted on) 74'
FW	14	(United States) Edson Buddle
FW	25	(United States) Brian Ching		(substituted on) 45'
FW	99	(Bolivia) Jaime Moreno		(substituted on) 63'
Manager:
(United States) Bruce Arena

GK	1	(Netherlands) Edwin van der Sar
RB	21	(Brazil) Rafael
CB	6	(England) Wes Brown
CB	23	(Northern Ireland) Jonny Evans	(yellow card) 53'
LB	20	(Brazil) Fabio		(substituted off) 72'
RM	26	(France) Gabriel Obertan		(substituted off) 23'
CM	24	(Scotland) Darren Fletcher
CM	22	(Republic of Ireland) John O'Shea
LM	17	(Portugal) Nani		(substituted off) 63'
CF	27	(Italy) Federico Macheda		(substituted off) 63'
CF	11	(Wales) Ryan Giggs (c)		(substituted off) 51'
Substitutes:
GK	29	(Poland) Tomasz Kuszczak
GK	40	(England) Ben Amos
DF	12	(England) Chris Smalling
DF	30	(Belgium) Ritchie De Laet
MF	13	(South Korea) Park Ji-sung
MF	18	(England) Paul Scholes		(substituted on) 72'
MF	28	(Republic of Ireland) Darron Gibson		(substituted on) 51'
MF	31	(Northern Ireland) Corry Evans
MF	35	(England) Tom Cleverley		(substituted on) 23'
FW	9	(Bulgaria) Dimitar Berbatov
FW	14	(Mexico) Javier Hernández		(substituted on) 63'
FW	19	(England) Danny Welbeck		(substituted on) 63'
FW	32	(Senegal) Mame Biram Diouf
Manager:
(Scotland) Sir Alex Ferguson

Most Valuable Player:
(Italy) Federico Macheda (Manchester United)
