= 2009 MLS All-Star Game =

Soccer game played in Sandy, Utah

- Event: Major League Soccer All-Star Game
MLS All-Stars	Everton
(United States) (Canada)	(England)
1	1
- Everton won 4–3 on penalties
- Date: July 29, 2009
- Venue: Rio Tinto Stadium, Sandy, Utah
- Man of the Match: Tim Howard (Everton)
- Referee: Ricardo Salazar
- Attendance: 20,124

The 2009 Major League Soccer All-Star Game was the 14th annual MLS All-Star Game. The MLS All-Stars faced Everton of the Premier League on July 29, 2009. The match ended in a 1–1 draw at full-time and went to an immediate penalty shootout, which Everton won 4–3. Everton's Tim Howard—the United States first-choice goalkeeper and a former MetroStars player—was named MVP of the match, after making three saves during the shootout. This was the first win for an international club team in six tries against the MLS All-Stars.

== Host venue ==
Major League Soccer announced on July 9, 2008 that America First Field (then known as Rio Tinto Stadium), the League's newest soccer-specific venue, would host the 2009 MLS All-Star Game in the summer of 2009. MLS President Mark Abbott joined Real Salt Lake Owner David W. Checketts, Utah Governor Jon M. Huntsman, Jr., and Sandy Mayor Tom Dolan at a press conference at the new Stadium to officially announce the event. This was the first MLS All-Star Game held in Utah.

== MLS All-Stars voting ==
Like the previous year, the MLS All-Star First XI was determined by an online fan voting system which accounted for 25% of the total vote, with players, coaches and general managers, and the media each holding 25% of the vote. The fan voting period opened May 13, 2009 and ended July 6, 2009. Two weeks into the fan voting period, Seattle Sounders FC players made up nine of the 11 top vote-getters, with Kasey Keller as the overall leader in total votes.

After the end of the voting period, Freddie Ljungberg received the most fan votes. The fan's first XI included Kasey Keller (Seattle), Chad Marshall (Columbus), Wilman Conde (Chicago), Geoff Cameron (Houston), Guillermo Barros Schelotto (Columbus), Stuart Holden (Houston), Freddie Ljungberg (Seattle), Shalrie Joseph (New England), Dwayne De Rosario (Toronto), Conor Casey (Colorado), and Landon Donovan (Los Angeles). The additional seven players were chosen by head coach Dominic Kinnear of Houston and the Commissioner Don Garber.

== 2009 MLS All-Star Game Rosters ==
=== Major League Soccer ===
The 2009 MLS All-Star First XI was announced in a special episode of MLSnet.com Extra Time, which aired 3 p.m. ET on Monday, July 13, 2009. On the following Monday, July 20, 2009, All-Star coach Dominic Kinnear and his assistants chose five additional players, with MLS Commissioner Don Garber adding the two final players to the 18-man roster. The All-Stars are:

As of July 26, 2009. Players in bold denotes First XI status. Note: Flags indicate national team as defined under FIFA eligibility rules; some limited exceptions apply. Players may hold more than one non-FIFA nationality.

No.	Pos.	Nation	Player
1	GK	USA	Zach Thornton ^
2	DF	COL	**Wilman Conde**
4	DF	MLI	Bakary Soumare &
5	MF	USA	Kyle Beckerman ♦
7	MF	CAN	Will Johnson %
8	MF	SWE	**Freddie Ljungberg**
9	FW	USA	**Conor Casey**
10	FW	USA	**Landon Donovan**
11	MF	USA	Brad Davis ♣
14	DF	USA	**Chad Marshall**
15	MF	USA	Davy Arnaud ♣
17	FW	COL	**Fredy Montero** ♣

No.	Pos.	Nation	Player
18	GK	USA	**Kasey Keller**
20	DF	USA	**Geoff Cameron**
22	MF	USA	**Stuart Holden**
34	DF	COL	Jhon Kennedy Hurtado ♣
70	MF	MEX	Cuauhtémoc Blanco ‡
77	MF	ARG	Javier Morales ♦
80	GK	CAN	Pat Onstad ♣^
88	MF	GRN	**Shalrie Joseph** %
90	MF	CAN	**Dwayne De Rosario** †
97	MF	ARG	**Guillermo Barros Schelotto**
99	FW	USA	Brian Ching ♣&

† - De Rosario was not available for the 2009 MLS All-Star game due to a Toronto FC CONCACAF Champions League game.

‡ - Blanco was chosen to take the place of De Rosario, being the next-highest vote getter in the midfield position.

♦ - "Commissioner's Picks", chosen by MLS Commissioner Don Garber.

♣ - Players selected by All-Star Coach Dominic Kinnear.

% - Johnson is an injury replacement for Joseph who suffered a bone bruise in his right knee.

& - Soumare was a replacement for Ching, who was rested after he competed in the 2009 CONCACAF Gold Cup with the US national team.

^ - Zach Thornton replaced Pat Onstad due to injury.

The following players fell short of the MLS All-Star First XI in voting:

- Goalkeepers:
  - Pat Onstad - 2.09% Fan votes, 3.11% Player votes, 2.53% Media votes, 6.36% Coach/GM votes
- Defenders:
  - Jhon Kennedy Hurtado - 5.42% Fan votes, 2.87% Player votes, 5.70% Media votes, 4.55% Coach/GM votes
  - Jonathan Bornstein - 1.80% Fan votes, 3.71% Player votes, 5.70% Media votes, 7.27% Coach/GM votes
- Midfielders:
  - Cuauhtémoc Blanco - 3.93% Fan votes, 2.75% Player votes, 11.08% Media votes, 4.09% Coach/GM votes
  - Ricardo Clark - 2.03% Fan votes, 5.86% Player votes, 4.75% Media votes, 8.18% Coach/GM votes
  - Osvaldo Alonso - 5.34% Fan votes, 2.39% Player votes, 7.28% Media votes, 3.18% Coach/GM votes
  - Paulo Nagamura - 1.02% Fan votes, 4.67% Player votes, 2.85% Media votes, 9.55% Coach/GM votes
- Forwards:
  - Fredy Montero - 6.39% Fan votes, 6.22% Player votes, 12.98% Media votes, 5.46% Coach/GM votes
  - Brian McBride - 3.40% Fan votes, 8.49% Player votes, 3.48% Media votes, 6.82% Coach/GM votes

=== Everton ===
As of July 12, 2009.

Note: Flags indicate national team as defined under FIFA eligibility rules; some limited exceptions apply. Players may hold more than one non-FIFA nationality.

No.	Pos.	Nation	Player
1	GK	ENG	Carlo Nash
2	DF	ENG	Tony Hibbert
3	DF	ENG	Leighton Baines
4	DF	NGR	Joseph Yobo
5	DF	ENG	Joleon Lescott
6	DF	ENG	Phil Jagielka
9	FW	FRA	Louis Saha
10	MF	ESP	Mikel Arteta
11	FW	BRA	Jô (on loan from Manchester City)
12	GK	SCO	Iain Turner
14	FW	ENG	James Vaughan
17	MF	AUS	Tim Cahill
18	MF	ENG	Phil Neville (captain)
20	MF	RSA	Steven Pienaar

No.	Pos.	Nation	Player
21	MF	ENG	Leon Osman
22	FW	NGR	Yakubu
24	GK	USA	Tim Howard
25	MF	BEL	Marouane Fellaini
26	MF	ENG	Jack Rodwell
27	FW	POL	Lukas Jutkiewicz
28	FW	NGR	Victor Anichebe
30	GK	ENG	John Ruddy
31	DF	IRL	Séamus Coleman
32	MF	ENG	Dan Gosling
35	FW	ENG	Kieran Agard
37	FW	ENG	Jose Baxter
38	MF	ENG	James Wallace
—	DF	GER	Shkodran Mustafi

== Match details ==
2009 MLS All-Star Game
July 29, 2009
9:25 p.m. EDT

MLS All-Stars (United States) (Canada)	1–1	(England) Everton
Davis 26'	Report	Saha 12'
Penalties
Donovan (penalty scored); Davis (penalty missed); Arnaud (penalty missed); Johnson (penalty scored); Casey (penalty scored); Ljungberg (penalty missed)	3–4	(penalty missed) Vaughan; (penalty missed) Jô; (penalty scored) Baines; (penalty scored) Neville; (penalty scored) Lescott; (penalty scored) Rodwell

Rio Tinto Stadium, Sandy, Utah
Attendance: 20,124
Referee: Ricardo Salazar (United States)

MLS All-Stars	Everton

GK	18	(United States) Kasey Keller	(substituted off) 46'	(substituted on) 62'
DF	20	(United States) Geoff Cameron
DF	14	(United States) Chad Marshall	(substituted off) 46'
DF	2	(Colombia) Wilman Conde	(substituted off) 63'
MF	22	(United States) Stuart Holden	(substituted off) 63'
MF	5	(United States) Kyle Beckerman	(substituted off) 46'
MF	8	(Sweden) Freddie Ljungberg (c)
MF	11	(United States) Brad Davis
FW	17	(Colombia) Fredy Montero	(substituted off) 46'
FW	9	(United States) Conor Casey
FW	70	(Mexico) Cuauhtémoc Blanco	(substituted off) 63'
Substitutes:
GK	1	(United States) Zach Thornton	(substituted on) 46'	(substituted off) 62'
DF	4	(Mali) Bakary Soumare	(substituted on) 46'
DF	34	(Colombia) Jhon Kennedy Hurtado	(substituted on) 63'
MF	7	(Canada) Will Johnson	(substituted on) 46'
MF	15	(United States) Davy Arnaud	(substituted on) 63'
MF	77	(Argentina) Javier Morales	(substituted on) 63'
FW	10	(United States) Landon Donovan	(substituted on) 46'
Manager:
(United States) Dominic Kinnear

GK	24	(United States) Tim Howard
DF	3	(England) Leighton Baines
DF	2	(England) Tony Hibbert
DF	5	(England) Joleon Lescott
DF	4	(Nigeria) Joseph Yobo
MF	17	(Australia) Tim Cahill		(substituted off) 76'
MF	26	(England) Jack Rodwell	(yellow card) 78'
MF	25	(Belgium) Marouane Fellaini		(substituted off) 56'
MF	18	(England) Phil Neville (c)
MF	21	(England) Leon Osman		(substituted off) 76'
FW	9	(France) Louis Saha		(substituted off) 76'
Substitutes:
GK	1	(England) Carlo Nash
MF	38	(England) James Wallace		(substituted on) 76'
FW	14	(England) James Vaughan		(substituted on) 76'
FW	11	(Brazil) Jô		(substituted on) 56'
FW	22	(Nigeria) Yakubu
FW	37	(England) Jose Baxter		(substituted on) 76'
Manager:
(Scotland) David Moyes

Man of the Match:
(United States) Tim Howard

Assistant referees:
(Canada) Joe Fletcher
(Canada) Philippe Briere
Fourth official:
(United States) Terry Vaughn

=== Statistics ===
	MLS	Everton
Goals scored	1	1
Total shots	21	6
Shots on target	8	3
Total Saves	2	7
Fouls	17	17
Offsides	2	1
Corner kicks	5	2
Yellow cards	0	1
Red cards	0	0

== Notes ==
- The 2009 Major League Soccer All-Star Game was the first to be played in the state of Utah.
- For the first time, AT&T was the official sponsor of the All-Star Game.
- This was the sixth time that the league's best players faced international competition in the MLS All-Star Game.
- The game was broadcast in the US on ESPN2 in English and TeleFutura in Spanish.
- This was the first All-Star match to be decided via penalty kicks.
- This was the first time the MLS All-Stars were defeated by an international opponent
- Early the next year, Landon Donovan would join Everton on a loan deal, and then again in early 2012.
