= Erik Friberg (footballer) =

Swedish footballer

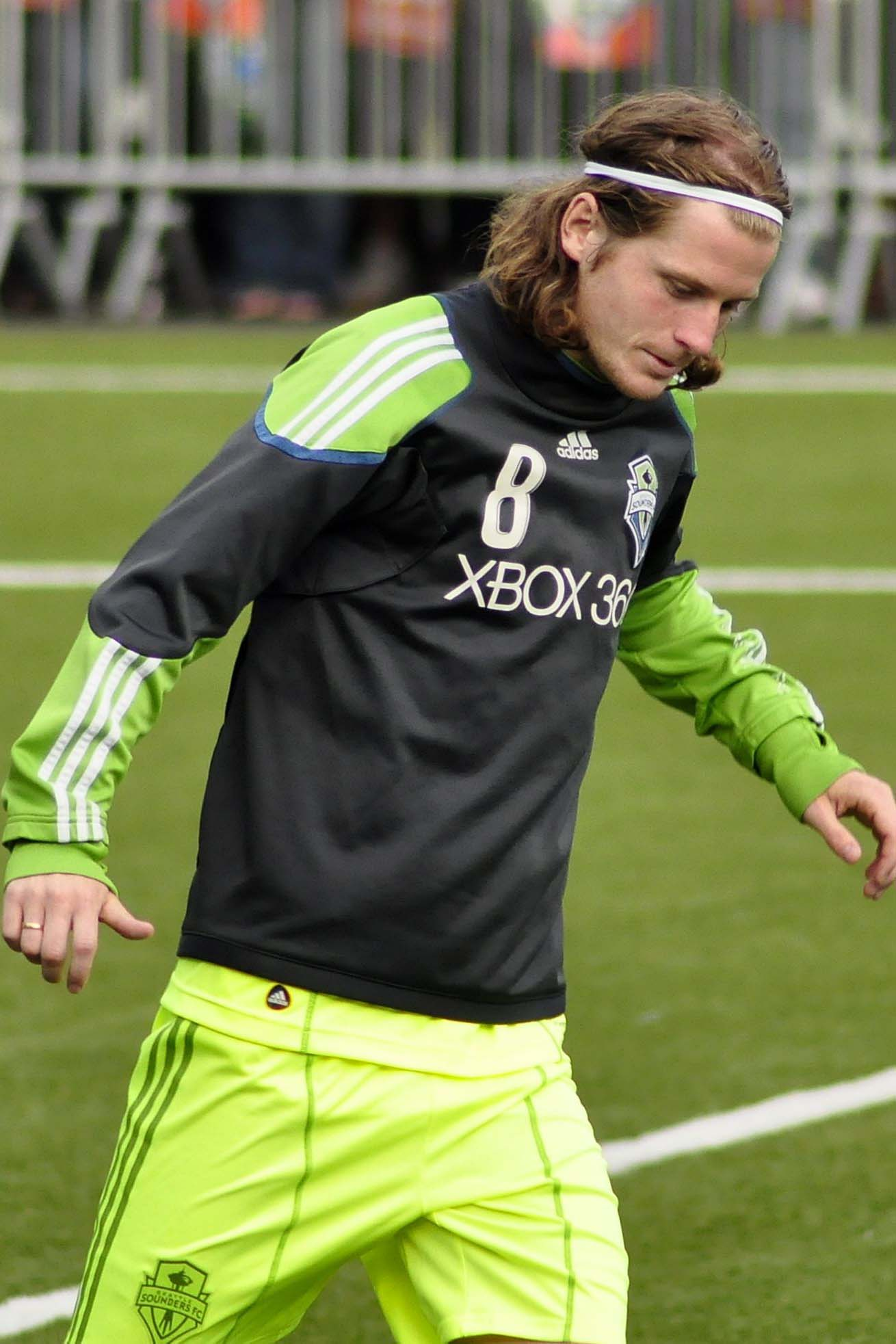
- Friberg with the Seattle Sounders in 2011

Personal information
- Full name: John Erik Gunnar Friberg
- Date of birth: 10 February 1986 (age 40)
- Place of birth: Lindome, Sweden
- Height: 1.80 m (5 ft 11 in)
- Position: Midfielder

Youth career
- 2003–2004: Västra Frölunda IF

Senior career*
Years	Team	Apps	(Gls)
2005–2006	Västra Frölunda IF	32	(3)
2007–2010	BK Häcken	94	(5)
2011	Seattle Sounders FC	28	(1)
2012–2013	Malmö FF	51	(6)
2014–2015	Bologna	7	(0)
2015	Esbjerg fB	13	(1)
2015–2016	Seattle Sounders FC	46	(1)
2017–2022	BK Häcken	138	(5)
Total		409	(22)

International career^{‡}
2012	Sweden	2	(0)
- * Club domestic league appearances and goals as of 8 November 2022 ‡ National team caps and goals as of 23 January 2012

John Erik Gunnar Friberg (born 10 February 1986) is a Swedish former professional footballer who played as a midfielder. Beginning his career with Västra Frölunda IF in 2005, he went on to represent Seattle Sounders FC, Malmö FF, Bologna, and Esbjerg fB before retiring at BK Häcken in 2022. He won two caps for the Sweden national team in 2012.

== Club career ==
=== Early career ===
Friberg began his career with Västra Frölunda IF before moving to BK Häcken in January 2007. He made his UEFA Europa League debut on 2 August 2007 against KR Reykjavíkur. The game ended 0–1 for Häcken. He played 20 minutes in two games against Spartak Moscow during the first round of the UEFA Cup.

=== Seattle Sounders FC ===
On 16 December 2010, it was announced that Friberg had signed a deal with Seattle Sounders FC of Major League Soccer. He made his debut for the Sounders in their opening game of the 2011 MLS season against Los Angeles Galaxy.

=== Malmö FF ===
On 12 December 2011, Seattle Sounders confirmed that Friberg would move to Malmö FF for the 2012 season. Malmö FF announced the day after that Friberg had signed a contract until the end of the 2014 season. He joined Malmö FF when the transfer window opened on 1 January 2012. Friberg was applauded by media for his play during the 2012 pre-season. Friberg later played 24 out of 30 matches during his first season at the club.

For the club's league title winning 2013 season Friberg played 27 matches and scored 6 goals. He also played all six matches of the club's participation in the qualifying stages for the 2013–14 UEFA Europa League. During the season Friberg earned the nickname Mr. 100% after scoring six goals in six shots on goal during the entire season. His most important goal of the season was when he scored the only goal of the game at home against Mjällby AIF in the 26th round of the league with just a couple of minutes to go of the game.

=== Bologna ===
On 30 January 2014, Friberg signed with Italian Serie A club Bologna.

=== Return to Seattle Sounders ===
Friberg returned to Seattle Sounders FC on 29 June 2015.

=== Return to BK Häcken ===
Friberg return to BK Häcken in 2017, and helped the club win the 2022 Allsvenskan title for the first time in the club's history before retiring at the end of the season.

== International career ==
Friberg was selected for the annual training camp for the Sweden national team in January 2012 after Malmö teammates Mathias Ranégie and Ivo Pękalski had to withdraw from the squad. The squad selection for the camp traditionally feature the best Swedish players in domestic and other Scandinavian leagues. He made his debut for Sweden in the friendly against Bahrain on 18 January 2012, replacing Oscar Hiljemark in the 86th minute of a 2–0 win.

== Personal life ==
He is the cousin of CS:GO player Adam Friberg.

== Career statistics ==
=== Club ===
Club	Season	League			Cup		Continental		Total	
Club	Season	Division	Apps	Goals	Apps	Goals	Apps	Goals	Apps	Goals
BK Häcken	2007	Superettan	14	0	—		3	0	17	0
BK Häcken	2008	Superettan	25	2	—		—		25	2
BK Häcken	2009	Allsvenskan	28	3	3	0	—		31	3
BK Häcken	2010	Allsvenskan	27	0	2	0	—		29	0
BK Häcken	Total		94	5	5	0	3	0	102	5
Seattle Sounders FC	2011	MLS	26	1	2	0	4	0	34	1
Malmö FF	2012	Allsvenskan	24	0	0	0	—		24	0
Malmö FF	2013	Allsvenskan	27	6	4	0	6	0	37	6
Malmö FF	Total		51	6	4	0	6	0	61	6
Bologna	2013–14	Serie A	7	0	0	0	—		7	0
Esbjerg fB	2014–15	Danish Superliga	13	1	3	0	—		16	1
Seattle Sounders	2015	MLS	16	1	0	0	3	1	19	2
Seattle Sounders	2016	MLS	30	0	2	0	2	0	34	0
Seattle Sounders	Total		46	1	2	0	5	1	53	2
BK Häcken	2017	Allsvenskan	27	1	5	0	—		32	1
BK Häcken	2018	Allsvenskan	26	1	4	1	4	0	34	2
BK Häcken	2019	Allsvenskan	24	2	4	0	2	0	30	2
BK Häcken	2020	Allsvenskan	28	1	6	1	–		34	2
BK Häcken	2021	Allsvenskan	15	0	3	0	–		18	0
BK Häcken	2022	Allsvenskan	18	0	1	0	–		22	0
BK Häcken	Total		138	5	23	2	6	0	170	7
Career total			375	19	37	2	24	1	442	22

=== International ===
Appearances and goals by national team and year

National team	Year	Apps	Goals
Sweden	2012	2	0
Total		2	0

== Honours ==
Malmö FF

- Allsvenskan: 2013
- Svenska Supercupen: 2013

Seattle Sounders FC

- MLS Cup: 2016
- Lamar Hunt U.S. Open Cup: 2011

BK Häcken

- Allsvenskan: 2022
- Svenska Cupen: 2018–19
