= Fredy Montero =

Colombian footballer (born 1987)

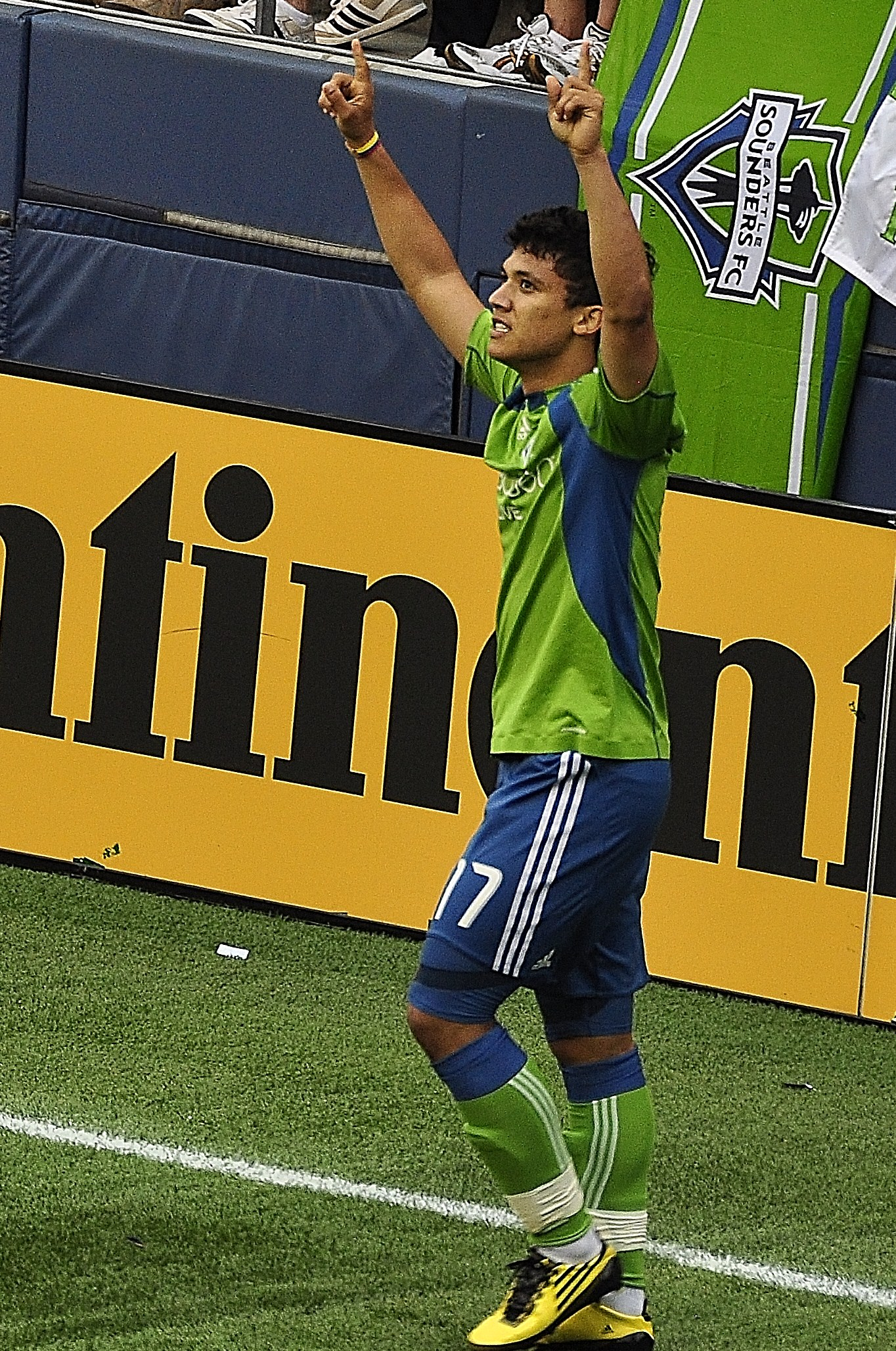
- Montero in July 2010

Personal information
- Full name: Fredy Henkyer Montero Muñoz
- Date of birth: 26 July 1987 (age 39)
- Place of birth: Campo de la Cruz, Colombia
- Height: 1.76 m (5 ft 9 in)
- Position: Forward

Team information
- Current team: Real Cartagena
- Number: 10

Youth career
- 2000–2005: Deportivo Cali

Senior career*
| Years | Team | Apps | (Gls) |
| 2005–2010 | Deportivo Cali | 65 | (22) |
| 2005 | → Academia (loan) | 9 | (0) |
| 2006–2007 | → Atlético Huila (loan) | 39 | (14) |
| 2009–2010 | → Seattle Sounders FC (loan) | 56 | (22) |
| 2011–2014 | Seattle Sounders FC | 63 | (25) |
| 2013 | → Millonarios (loan) | 22 | (8) |
| 2013–2014 | → Sporting CP (loan) | 16 | (13) |
| 2014–2016 | Sporting CP | 51 | (14) |
| 2016–2017 | Tianjin TEDA | 29 | (9) |
| 2017 | → Vancouver Whitecaps FC (loan) | 33 | (13) |
| 2018–2019 | Sporting CP | 20 | (3) |
| 2019–2020 | Vancouver Whitecaps FC | 48 | (13) |
| 2021–2023 | Seattle Sounders FC | 55 | (11) |
| 2024 | Deportivo Cali | 21 | (7) |
| 2025– | Real Cartagena | 58 | (47) |

International career^{‡}
| 2007–2009 | Colombia | 4 | (0) |
- * Club domestic league appearances and goals as of 13 July 2026 ‡ National team caps and goals as of 13 December 2018

Fredy Henkyer Montero Muñoz (born 26 July 1987), known as Fredy Montero (Spanish pronunciation: [ˈfɾeði monˈteɾo], is a Colombian professional footballer who plays as a forward for Real Cartagena. He was the all-time top scorer for the Seattle Sounders until being surpassed by Raúl Ruidíaz in 2024. He scored 79 goals with the club across two stints: from 2009 to 2012, and from 2021 to 2023. Montero has been called up to the Colombia national team five times, scoring once in an unofficial match against Catalonia.

Montero began playing youth soccer at Deportivo Cali at age six. He earned his professional debut at age 18 in 2005 before being sent on loan to Academia for the season. Montero was loaned to Atlético Huila for two additional years, becoming the league topscorer in the 2007 Torneo Apertura before returning to Deportivo Cali and becoming league top scorer for a second time in the 2008 Torneo Finalización.

Montero was loaned to the Major League Soccer expansion team Seattle Sounders in 2009, where he was named Newcomer of the Year and led the team in goals. Montero was sold to the Sounders in 2010 and became a Designated Player and a permanent resident of the United States. During his four seasons as a Sounders player, Montero was named to the MLS All-Star squad twice, playing against Everton in 2009 and being named inactive in 2010.

Montero played for a number of years in Portugal at Sporting CP; across two stints from 2013 to 2016 and 2018 to 2019, he netted 43 goals across all competitions for Os Leões. He also played in Canada for Vancouver Whitecaps and in China for Tianjin TEDA.

== Club career ==
=== Atlético Huila ===
Montero was loaned to Atlético Huila in 2006, where he was named top goalscorer of the 2007 Apertura, tied on 13 goals with Sergio Galván Rey. Despite rumors and interest from European clubs, he returned to Deportivo Cali in 2007; he was again the top goalscorer, with 16 goals in the 2008 Finalizacion.

=== Seattle Sounders ===
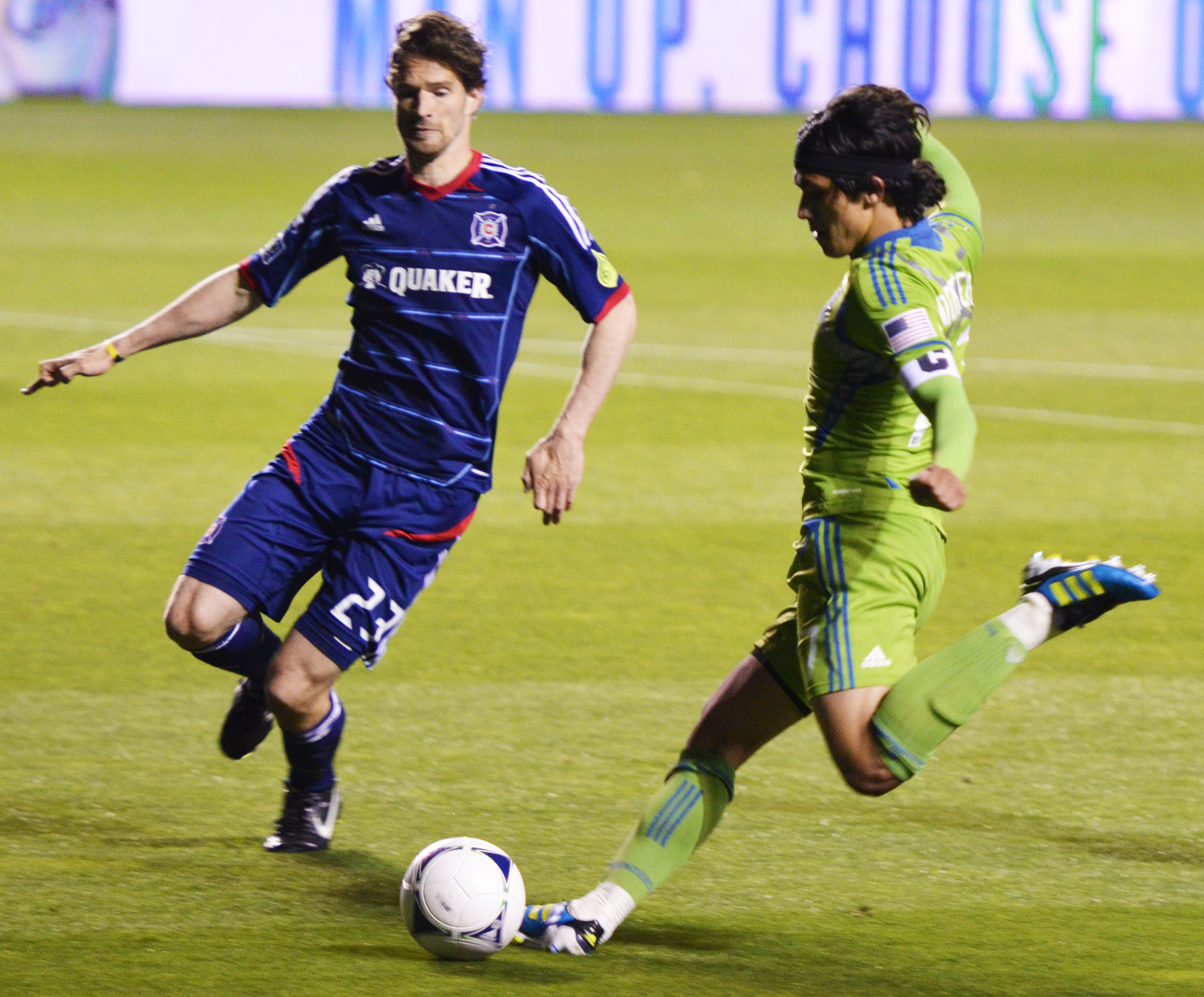
Montero (right) crosses the ball in front of Chicago Fire defender Arne Friedrich

Montero was acquired by Seattle Sounders in January 2009 on loan from Deportivo Cali. There were unconfirmed reports that suggested Montero's contract was owned by a third party. Montero adapted well to the club, scoring nine goals in nine preseason games. He made his MLS debut on 19 March 2009, in the 2009 season opener against New York Red Bulls, and scored the first and third goals in club history. Montero was named the MLS Player of the Week for the first week of the 2009 MLS season for his two goals. An additional goal against Real Salt Lake helped Montero be named MLS Player of the Month for March 2009 as he won the first two Goals of the Week.

In April 2009, Montero told Sports Illustrated that he would like to play in Europe in the future and that the mix of players in MLS appealed to him as a place to learn. He later dismissed a rumor of a transfer to Fulham and told the press that he was focused on the Sounders.

Montero was selected to the 2009 MLS All-Star Game against Everton and played during the first half alongside teammates Kasey Keller and Jhon Kennedy Hurtado. He would go on to be named the MLS Newcomer of the Year. In August 2009, it was incorrectly reported that MLS had negotiated the transfer of Deportivo Cali's portion of Montero's rights to Major League Soccer. It was believed that the league owned his rights, but details of any such deal were never publicly clarified.

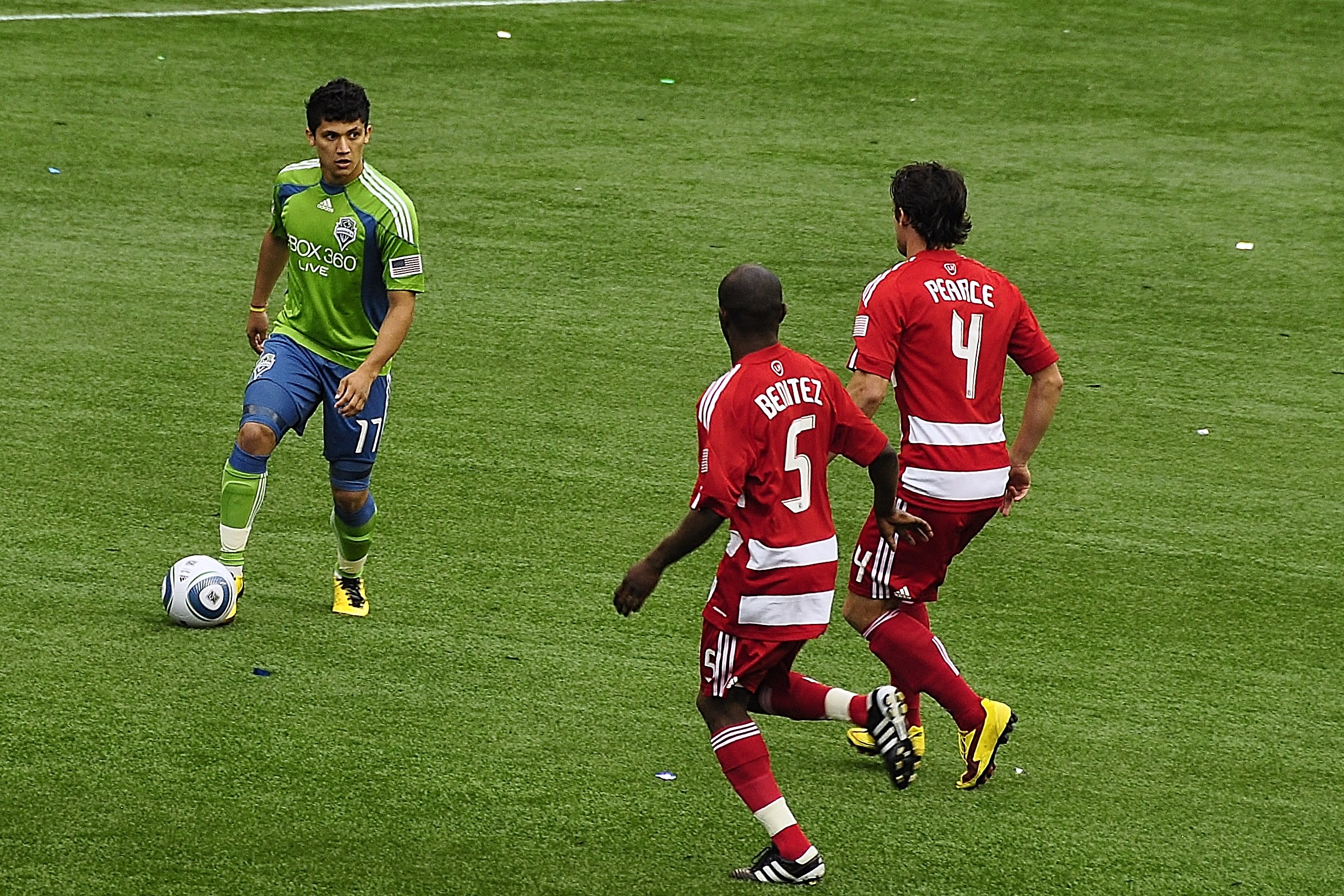
Montero in a 2010 match against Dallas

Montero did not meet the high expectations of coach Schmid and the fans at the beginning of the 2010. He was left out of the starting lineup for the ninth game of the year. By July, he was named player of the month and selected to the inactive roster of the 2010 MLS All-Star Game. A scheduling conflict between a team CONCACAF Champions League match and the game made him unable to start in the exhibition game. Montero earned his second career MLS Player of the Month in July 2010. Although he failed to score a goal in league play between 1 September and the end of the season on 23 October, Montero finished the year with 10 goals and 10 assists. He totaled 12 goals, of which 6 were game-winners, and 11 assists in all competitions. A total of 22 goals and 17 assists in league play between 2009 and 2010 was the third most in the league. Montero was also named as the top player in the MLS "24 Under 24" list, which honors players under 24 years old who perform well in MLS.

On 1 December 2010, Seattle Sounders FC announced that Montero had agreed to a contract extension with his rights permanently transferred to the club and Major League Soccer. He became the third Designated Player and the highest paid player on the team with a base salary of $500,000.

Before the second game of the 2011 season, Montero fractured his wrist. He missed two matches and played with a cast that may have contributed to multiple matches of reduced performance. His play improved by midseason. Schmid attributed it to increased growth, maturity, and fitness. The addition of Mauro Rosales to the team's midfield also helped Montero in the second half of the season. Montero ended the regular season of league play with 12 goals. He ended the year with 18 goals in all competitions. His goals scoring efforts made him the MLS player who scored the most goals across all competitive match in 2011. The Sounders won the 2011 Lamar Hunt U.S. Open Cup. Montero was named Player of the Tournament after scoring three game-winning goals in the final three games.

=== Millonarios ===
Montero was officially loaned to Colombian champions Millonarios, playing in the Categoría Primera A, on 21 January 2013, also signing a multi-year extension to his contract with the Sounders.

=== Sporting CP ===
Montero was loaned to Primeira Liga side Sporting CP on 22 July 2013 for US$1.2 million with an option to buy. On his debut for the Portuguese club, Montero scored a hat-trick against newly promoted side Arouca, in a 5–1 win in the first round of the Primeira Liga season. On 31 August, Montero opened the scoring with a header in a 1–1 draw with Lisbon rivals Benfica at the Alvalade. Montero was named the SJPF Player of the Month for the months of August and September, having scored nine goals in the first six games.

On 30 January 2014, it was announced that Montero had signed a four-and-a-half-year deal with Sporting for an additional $1.55 million transfer fee plus bonuses. Montero scored his first goal for Sporting since December 2013, netting in a 4–0 win over Penafiel on 4 October 2014.

=== Tianjin TEDA ===
On 6 February 2016, Montero transferred to Chinese Super League side Tianjin TEDA for €5 million.

=== Vancouver Whitecaps FC ===
On 15 February 2017, Montero transferred to Major League Soccer side Vancouver Whitecaps on loan from Chinese Super League side Tianjin TEDA.

=== Return to Sporting CP ===
On 17 January 2018, it was announced that Montero had returned to Sporting CP on an 18-month contract. Months later, on 15 May, he and several of his teammates, including coaches, were injured following an attack by around 50 supporters of Sporting at the club's training ground after the team finished third in the league and missed out on the UEFA Champions League qualification. Despite the events, he and the rest of the team agreed to play in the Portuguese Cup final scheduled for the following weekend.

=== Return to Vancouver ===
On 15 February 2019, Montero and Sporting agreed to mutually terminate his contract with the club. The same day, Vancouver announced he had joined the club on a permanent deal.

=== Return to Seattle ===
On 4 March 2021, Montero re-joined Seattle Sounders FC. He had expressed a desire to return to the Seattle area and retire as a Sounder, while the club were in need of a new forward to replace the injured Jordan Morris. Montero retook the all-time scoring record for the Sounders in April 2021, surpassing Clint Dempsey, and ended the season with two goals. Following the 2021 season, Seattle declined their contract option on Montero.

He returned on a new deal before the 2022 season. That season, he played an important role in Seattle's CONCACAF Champions League title, which led the board to resign him for the 2023 season.

=== Return to Deportivo Cali ===
After his contract with Seattle Sounders expired at the end of the 2023 season, Montero's return to Deportivo Cali was announced on 2 April 2024. Montero scored 7 goals in 21 matches during his second stint in Cali.

=== Real Cartagena ===
In December 2024, Montero joined Real Cartagena for the 2025 Colombian second division season. He scored 30 goals in 38 matches, and was the second highest scorer in the league during both the Torneo I and Torneo II stages of the season. Montero left the club in November 2025 after it failed to win promotion to the first division.

== International career ==
Montero received his first international cap during a 4–0 win against Panama on 9 May 2007, playing the final 13 minutes of the match at Estadio Rommel Fernández in Panama City. In October 2008, he started and played 55 minutes in a 1–0 World Cup qualifying loss to Paraguay in Bogotá. The forward scored his first goal for Colombia in the 2nd minute of extra time against Catalonia on 29 December 2008 during a 2–1 loss at Camp Nou in Barcelona. Montero last played for Colombia in a 2–1 loss against Venezuela during a friendly on 12 August 2009. Montero has expressed interest in returning to the national team but has failed to receive a call-up.

== Personal life ==
Fredy was born to parents Fredy Montero Sr., a policeman, and Jaynne, who currently reside in Barranquilla, Colombia. He is the oldest of four children and has two sisters, Jaynne Jr. and Fyorella, as well as a brother named Luiggi. Montero married his girlfriend Alexis Immig, a Gig Harbor native, during a private ceremony in April 2012. They have three daughters and live in Bellevue, Washington.

Montero was named MLS Humanitarian of the Month for March 2011 after raising over $29,000 to donate towards relief for victims of the 2010 Colombian floods. Montero threw out the first pitch for the Seattle Mariners baseball team against the Cleveland Indians on 21 August 2012, shortly after honoring Félix Hernández's perfect game in his goal celebration against the Vancouver Whitecaps FC. Montero was also the subject of an episode of the MLS 36 documentary series that debuted on 10 August 2012. The episode filmed his preparations and gameplay during a friendly against Chelsea F.C. on 18 July 2012. The episode revealed that his dog is named FIFA (after the governing body of the sport) and that Montero is a fan of EA Sports' FIFA video game franchise.

Montero gained permanent residency in the United States in 2010. He was accused of sexual assault in April 2010, but the charges were dropped after a prosecutor found insufficient evidence. He is a part-owner of Santo Coffee Company, a coffeeshop in Seattle's Roosevelt neighborhood that opened in 2019.

== Career statistics ==
=== Club ===
As of 16 August 2021

Appearances and goals by club, season and competition
| Club | Season | League | | | National cup (Note: Includes U.S. Open Cup, Taça de Portugal, Chinese FA Cup) | | League cup (Note: Includes Taça da Liga) | | Continental | | Other | | Total | |
| Club | Season | Division | Apps | Goals | Apps | Goals | Apps | Goals | Apps | Goals | Apps | Goals | Apps | Goals |
|---|---|---|---|---|---|---|---|---|---|---|---|---|---|---|
| Deportivo Cali | 2005 | Primera A | 8 | 0 | — | | — | | — | | — | | 8 | 0 |
| Deportivo Cali | 2006 | Primera A | 2 | 0 | — | | — | | — | | — | | 2 | 0 |
| Deportivo Cali | 2007 | Primera A | 17 | 3 | — | | — | | — | | — | | 17 | 3 |
| Deportivo Cali | 2008 | Primera A | 38 | 19 | 0 | 0 | — | | 2 (Note: Appearances in Copa Sudamericana) | 1 | — | | 40 | 20 |
| Deportivo Cali | Total | | 65 | 22 | 0 | 0 | 0 | 0 | 2 | 1 | 0 | 0 | 67 | 23 |
| Academia (loan) | 2005 | Primera B | 9 | 0 | — | | — | | — | | — | | 9 | 0 |
| Atlético Huila (loan) | 2006 | Primera A | 17 | 1 | — | | — | | — | | — | | 17 | 1 |
| Atlético Huila (loan) | 2007 | Primera A | 22 | 13 | — | | — | | — | | — | | 22 | 13 |
| Atlético Huila (loan) | Total | | 39 | 14 | 0 | 0 | 0 | 0 | 0 | 0 | 0 | 0 | 39 | 14 |
| Seattle Sounders FC (loan) | 2009 | MLS | 27 | 12 | 4 | 1 | — | | — | | 2 (Note: Appearances in MLS Cup Playoffs) | 0 | 33 | 13 |
| Seattle Sounders FC (loan) | 2010 | MLS | 29 | 10 | 3 | 1 | — | | 6 (Note: Appearances in CONCACAF Champions League) | 1 | 2 | 0 | 40 | 12 |
| Seattle Sounders FC | 2011 | MLS | 30 | 12 | 3 | 3 | — | | 9 | 3 | 2 | 0 | 44 | 18 |
| Seattle Sounders FC | 2012 | MLS | 33 | 13 | 3 | 2 | — | | 3 | 2 | 4 | 0 | 43 | 17 |
| Seattle Sounders FC | Total | | 119 | 47 | 13 | 7 | 0 | 0 | 18 | 6 | 10 | 0 | 160 | 60 |
| Millonarios (loan) | 2013 | Primera A | 22 | 8 | 5 | 2 | — | | 5 (Note: Appearances in Copa Libertadores) | 0 | 2 (Note: Appearance(s) in Superliga Colombiana) | 0 | 34 | 10 |
| Sporting CP (loan) | 2013–14 | Primeira Liga | 29 | 13 | 1 | 0 | 2 | 0 | 0 | 0 | — | | 32 | 13 |
| Sporting CP | 2014–15 | Primeira Liga | 26 | 11 | 4 | 4 | 0 | 0 | 7 (Note: Five appearances in UEFA Champions League, two appearances in UEFA Europa League) | 0 | — | | 37 | 15 |
| Sporting CP | 2015–16 | Primeira Liga | 12 | 3 | 1 | 0 | 3 | 0 | 6 (Note: One appearance in UEFA Champions League, five appearances and three goals in UEFA Europa League) | 3 | — | | 22 | 6 |
| Sporting CP | Total | | 67 | 27 | 6 | 4 | 5 | 0 | 13 | 3 | 0 | 0 | 91 | 34 |
| Tianjin TEDA | 2016 | Chinese Super League | 29 | 9 | 1 | 0 | — | | — | | — | | 30 | 9 |
| Vancouver Whitecaps FC (loan) | 2017 | MLS | 33 | 13 | 0 | 0 | — | | 3 | 1 | 3 | 1 | 39 | 15 |
| Sporting CP | 2017–18 | Primeira Liga | 11 | 1 | 3 | 1 | 2 | 0 | 5 (Note: Appearances in UEFA Europa League) | 3 | — | | 21 | 5 |
| Sporting CP | 2018–19 | Primeira Liga | 9 | 2 | 0 | 0 | 2 | 0 | 5 | 2 | — | | 16 | 4 |
| Sporting CP | Total | | 20 | 3 | 3 | 1 | 4 | 0 | 10 | 5 | 0 | 0 | 37 | 9 |
| Vancouver Whitecaps FC | 2019 | MLS | 32 | 8 | 0 | 0 | — | | — | | 1 | 0 | 33 | 8 |
| Vancouver Whitecaps FC | 2020 | MLS | 16 | 5 | — | | — | | — | | — | | 16 | 5 |
| Vancouver Whitecaps FC | Total | | 48 | 13 | 0 | 0 | 0 | 0 | 0 | 0 | 1 | 0 | 49 | 13 |
| Seattle Sounders FC | 2021 | MLS | 16 | 6 | — | | — | | — | | — | | 16 | 6 |
| Career total | | | 467 | 162 | 28 | 13 | 9 | 0 | 51 | 16 | 16 | 1 | 571 | 192 |

=== International ===
As of match played 12 August 2009

Appearances and goals by national team and year
| National team | Year | Apps | Goals |
|---|---|---|---|
| Colombia | 2007 | 2 | 0 |
| Colombia | 2008 | 1 | 0 |
| Colombia | 2009 | 1 | 0 |
| Total | | 4 | 0 |

== Honours ==
Seattle Sounders FC

- CONCACAF Champions League: 2022
- Lamar Hunt U.S. Open Cup: 2009, 2010, 2011

Sporting CP

- Taça de Portugal: 2014–15, 2018–19
- Taça da Liga: 2017–18, 2018–19
- Supertaça Cândido de Oliveira: 2015

Individual

- Categoría Primera A top goalscorer: 2007 Torneo Apertura, 2008 Torneo Finalización
- Lamar Hunt U.S. Open Cup Player of the Tournament: 2011
- MLS 24 Under 24 Top Player: 2010
- MLS All-Star: 2009, 2010
- MLS Humanitarian of the Month: March 2010
- FutbolMLS.com's 2010 Latino del Año: November 2010
- MLS Newcomer of the Year Award: 2009
- Major League Soccer Player of the Month: March 2009, July 2010

Awards and achievements
| Preceded by Darren Huckerby | MLS Newcomer of the Year Award; 2009 | Succeeded by Álvaro Saborío |
