= Mike Fucito =

American soccer player (born 1986)

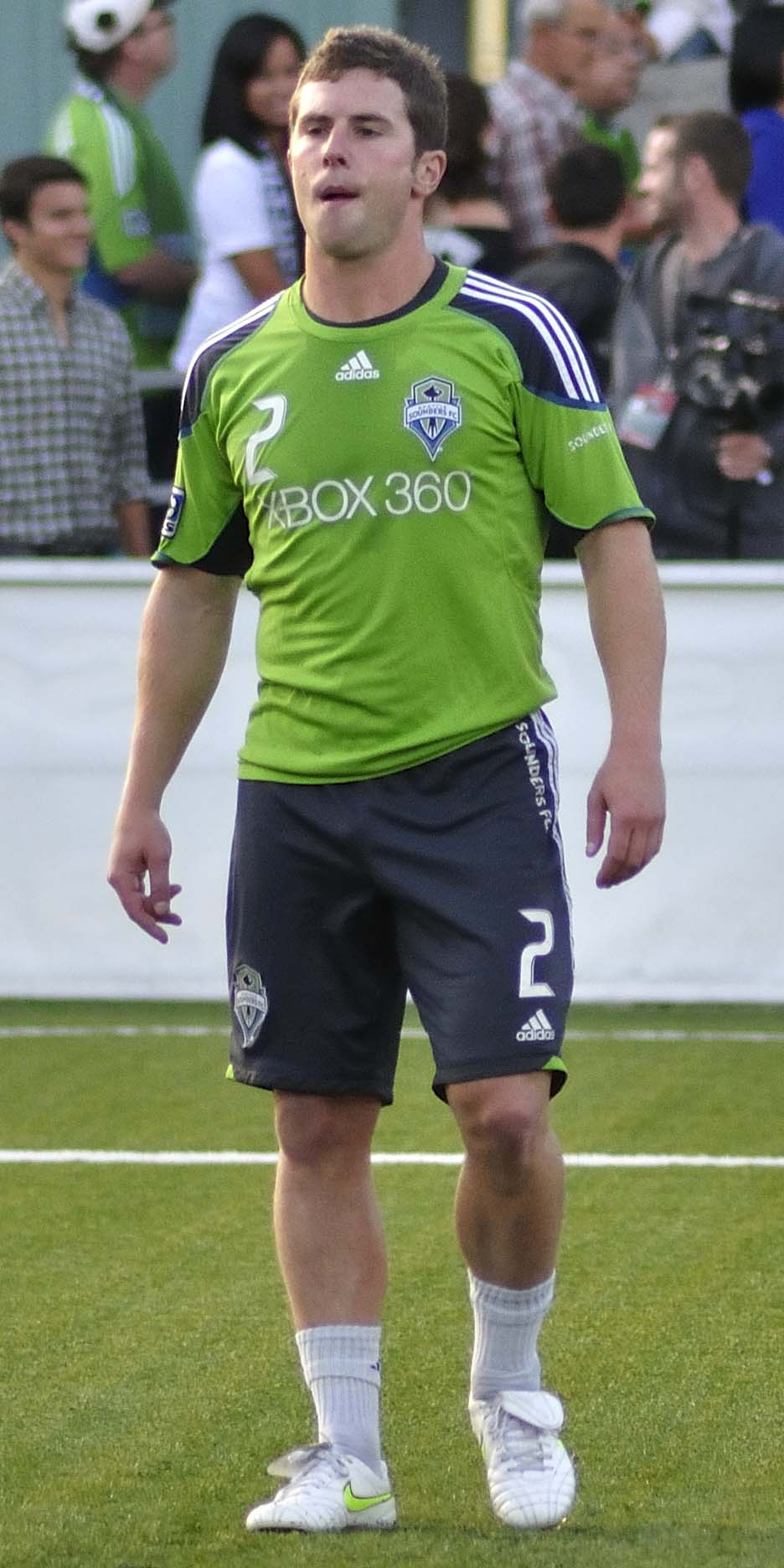

Personal information
- Full name: Michael Fucito
- Date of birth: March 29, 1986 (age 40)
- Place of birth: Concord, Massachusetts, United States
- Height: 1.75 m (5 ft 9 in)
- Positions: Forward; winger

College career
Years	Team	Apps	(Gls)
2004–2008	Harvard Crimson	69	(32)

Senior career*
Years	Team	Apps	(Gls)
2009–2011	Seattle Sounders FC	23	(3)
2012	Montreal Impact	1	(0)
2012	Portland Timbers	12	(0)
2013–2015	San Jose Earthquakes	17	(0)
2014	→ Sacramento Republic (loan)	5	(2)
Total		58	(5)
- * Club domestic league appearances and goals as of July 29, 2015

Michael Fucito (born March 29, 1986) is a retired American soccer player.

== Career ==
=== High School and College ===
Fucito played for the Brooks School in North Andover, Massachusetts for three years where he was senior Captain. He played forward/striker alongside Charlie Davies, making the striking duo one of (if not) the most lethal HS scoring combination(s) in the country. He also wrestled and played hockey. In 2003, he led Brooks to the first undefeated/untied season in (ISL) league history, and to winning the New England Prep 'A' Championship. He was also voted All-New England, All-State, and All-League. He was the league leader in assists, third overall in points scoring, and was the ISL coaches' runner-up to Davies for MVP. From 2002 to 2004, he also played for FC Greater Boston Bolts, who were the U-18 Region 1 Champions in 2004. Fucito was MVP of the 2003 MA State Finals. The Bolts also won: the Region 1 Premier League Championship (2003), Disney Showcase Championship (2002, 2003), and MA State Championship (2000–04).

Fucito attended the Ivy League university Harvard where he played varsity soccer for four years. In 2004, he was named Ivy League Rookie of the Year, scoring three goals and tallying three assists, and was named to the All-Ivy second team as a freshman. Fucito did not play in 2005, instead playing the eventual Acton Indoor Soccer Champion, Mean Machine. He had tremendous success at Harvard from 2006 to 2008 playing both left wing and forward. He was named NSCAA All-America second team in 2007 and 2008 (both as a forward); All-Northeast Region first team and All-Ivy League first team in 2006–2008, as well as the team MVP in 2006. That year he scored nine goals and ranked among the nation's leaders with a total of nine assists, playing left wing. Fucito was also honored as SoccerTimes’ National Player of the Week as a result of scoring the game-winning goal against Fairfield in double overtime, and two goals and three assists against Brown. He led Harvard to the NCAA-tournament three consecutive years. In 2007 and 2008, he was named Academic All-Ivy League. He was also named to the ESPN Academic All-District team in 2007. He completed his Harvard career ranked 4th All-time in scoring with 32 career goals, and 24 assists, despite playing injured his final two seasons, and undergoing hip surgery in the off-season. He was named Captain as a senior, and was a Finalist for the Lowe's Senior CLASS Award. He ranked 21st in the nation averaging 1.57 points per game.

=== Professional ===
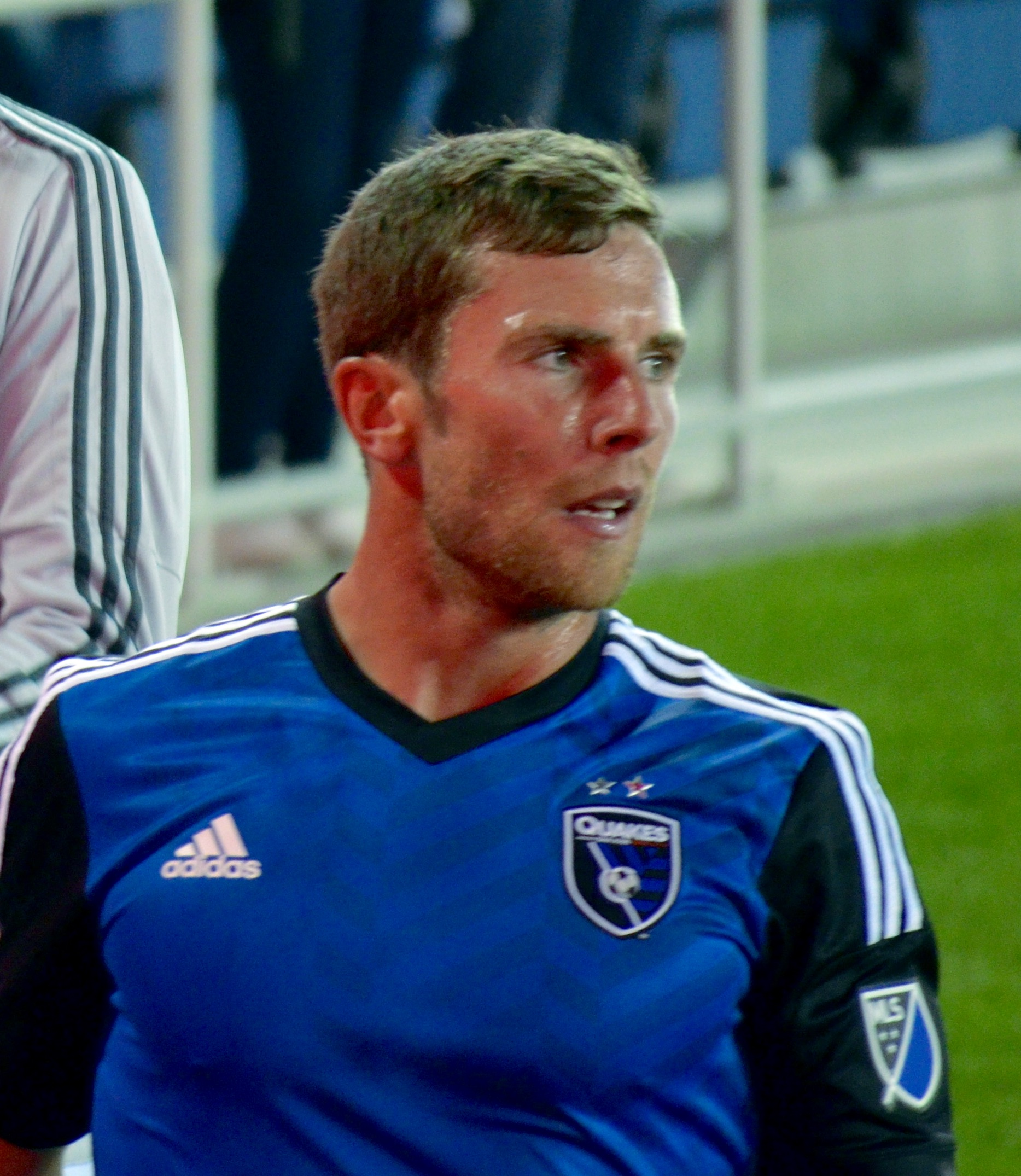

Fucito was drafted in the fourth round (46th overall) of the 2009 MLS SuperDraft by Seattle Sounders FC. He attended part of the Sounders preseason, including traveling with the team to Argentina in March 2009. He returned to Harvard to finish his degree, before rejoining the Sounders on July 3, 2009, when he signed a developmental contract.

Despite returning quickly to full health, Fucito was not activated for the remainder of the 2009 MLS season after being diagnosed with sesamoiditis in his right foot. He was briefly waived on November 25, 2009, before he could make his professional debut. Nonetheless, Fucito was invited back to camp and was then re-signed prior to the 2010 season. He accompanied the team to Spain, and scored three goals in preseason, including two in the first half against the Sounders starters in the final contest. As a result, he was finally rewarded by being designated to the "dress-18", and subsequently made his professional debut on March 25, 2010, in the opening game of the 2010 MLS season against Philadelphia Union.

On April 17, 2010, Fucito scored his first MLS goal, a game-winning strike in stoppage time off a throw-in by Brad Evans during a match between Sounders FC and the then Kansas City Wizards. Fucito finished strong with his right foot over the left shoulder of Jimmy Nielsen.

Fucito earned his first professional start on September 22, 2010, versus Monterrey in the CONCACAF Champions League group stage. He scored a goal and forced an own-goal in that match. His first start in league play came on May 25, 2011, versus FC Dallas. Fucito became a particular fan favorite for his intensity and "never-say-die" attitude.

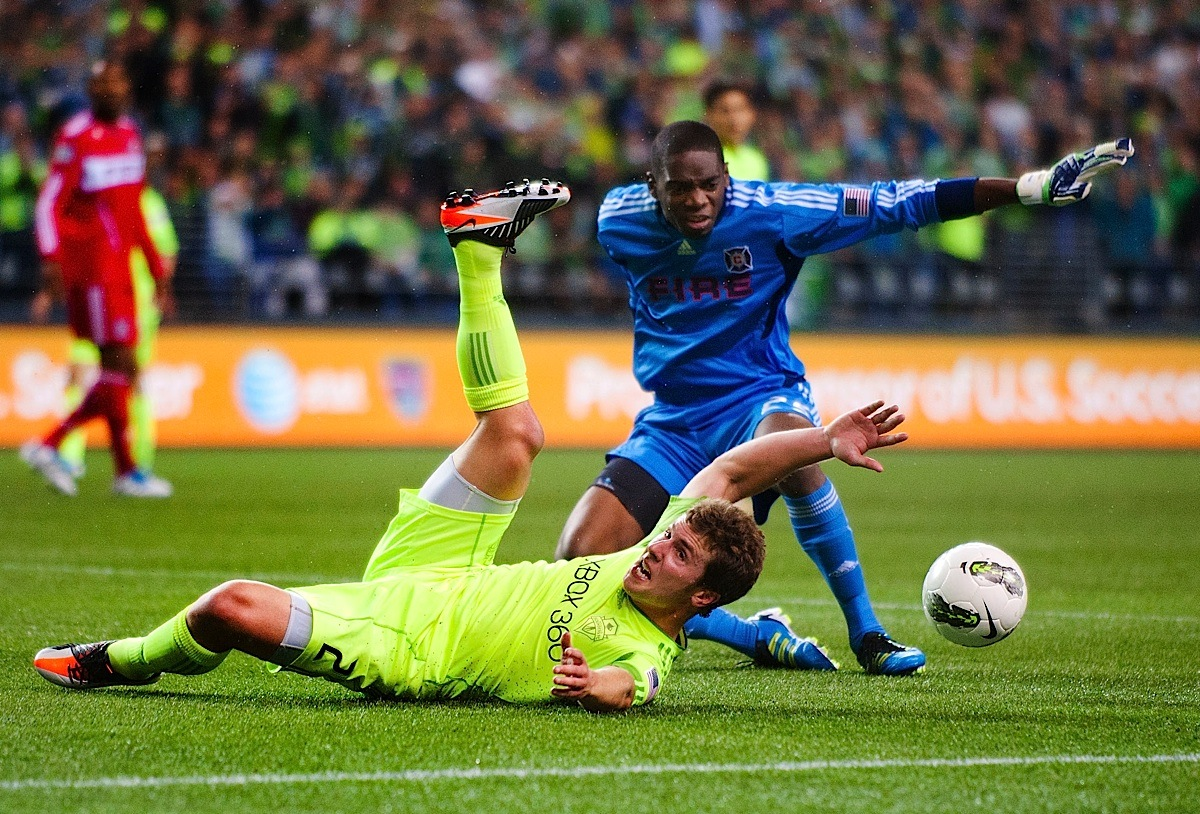
Fucito in the 2011 US Open Cup Final

Fucito was traded to Montreal Impact on February 18, 2012, along with teammate Lamar Neagle, in exchange for Eddie Johnson.

Fucito failed to settle in Montreal, and was traded to Portland Timbers on April 20, 2012, in exchange for an international roster spot.

On January 17, 2013, Fucito was traded to San Jose Earthquakes for a second-round 2013 MLS SuperDraft pick.

== Statistics ==
Club performance			League		Cup		League Cup		Continental		Total	
Season	Club	League	Apps	Goals	Apps	Goals	Apps	Goals	Apps	Goals	Apps	Goals
USA			League		Open Cup		League Cup		North America		Total	
2009	Seattle Sounders FC	Major League Soccer	0	0	0	0	0	0	0	0	0	0
2010	Seattle Sounders FC	Major League Soccer	4	1	0	0	1	0	4	3	9	4
2011	Seattle Sounders FC	Major League Soccer	19	2	4	2	2	0	4	2	29	6
Canada			League		Voyageurs Cup		League Cup		North America		Total	
2012	Montreal Impact	Major League Soccer	1	0	0	0	0	0	0	0	1	0
USA			League		Open Cup		League Cup		North America		Total	
2012	Portland Timbers	Major League Soccer	12	0	0	0	0	0	0	0	12	0
2013	San Jose Earthquakes	Major League Soccer	7	0	1	0	0	0	0	0	8	0
2014	San Jose Earthquakes	Major League Soccer	5	0	2	0	0	0	0	0	7	0
2014	Sacramento Republic FC (loan)	USL Pro	5	2	0	0	0	0	0	0	5	2
Total	USA		52	5	7	2	3	0	8	5	70	12
Total	Canada		1	0	0	0	0	0	0	0	1	0
Career total			53	5	7	2	3	0	8	5	71	12

== Honors ==
Seattle Sounders FC

- Lamar Hunt U.S. Open Cup: 2011
