= Jhon Kennedy Hurtado =

Colombian footballer (born 1984)

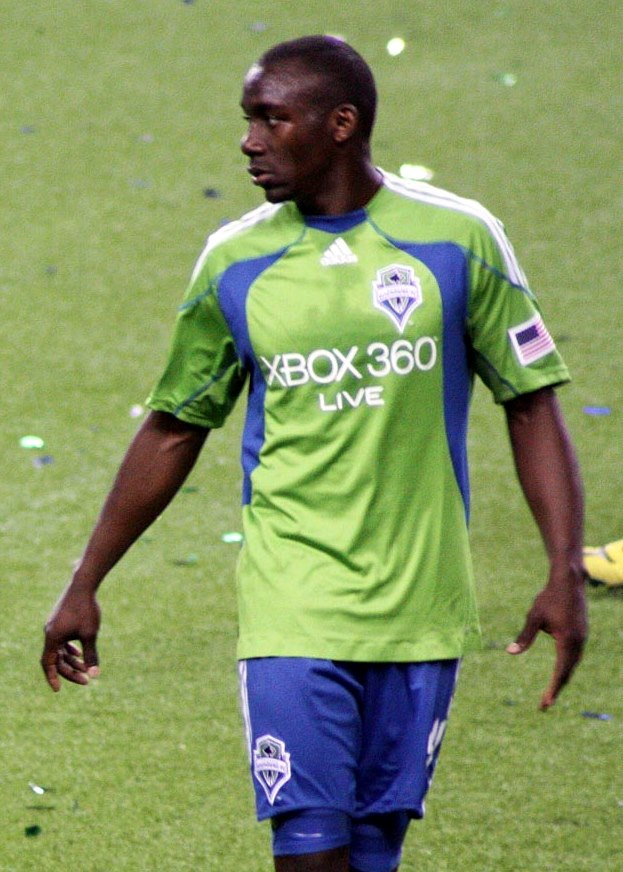

Personal information
- Full name: Jhon Kennedy Hurtado Valencia
- Date of birth: May 16, 1984 (age 42)
- Place of birth: Palmira, Colombia
- Height: 6 ft 0 in (1.83 m)
- Position: Defender

Youth career
- Deportivo Cali

Senior career*
Years	Team	Apps	(Gls)
2004	Unión Magdalena	8	(0)
2005	Monagas		
2006–2007	Centauros	12	(0)
2006	→ Expreso Rojo (loan)	17	(1)
2007	→ Real Cartagena (loan)	28	(0)
2008–2009	Deportivo Cali	23	(0)
2009	→ Expreso Rojo (loan)	1	(1)
2009	→ Seattle Sounders FC (loan)	27	(1)
2010–2013	Seattle Sounders FC	81	(0)
2014	Chicago Fire	19	(1)
2014	Chivas USA	6	(0)
2025	Ballard FC	1	(0)
- * Club domestic league appearances and goals as of October 29, 2014

Jhon Kennedy Hurtado Valencia (born May 16, 1984) is a Colombian footballer who last played for Chivas USA in Major League Soccer.

== Career ==
=== Professional ===
Hurtado began his career in the youth ranks of Deportivo Cali. In 2004, he began his professional career with Unión Magdalena, and since went on to appear in 121 matches at the first and second division levels in Colombia. In 2005 Hurtado played for Monagas in the Primera División Venezolana. The following season, he returned to Colombia signing with Centauros. In 2007, Hurtado played for Expreso Rojo and Real Cartagena of the Colombian Categoría Primera B, while in 2008 he played for Deportivo Cali.

Known for his incredible pace, Hurtado had a trial at Italian giants Milan, and played a friendly against German side Hannover, prior to signing with Major League Soccer expansion side Seattle Sounders FC on loan from Cali. “Jhon has good speed, he’s a good man-to-man marker, a good tackler and uses his speed to close people down,” said Sounders FC technical director Chris Henderson. “We had a chance to see him play 2-3 times, plus some video. We’re excited to have him join our team.” Hurtado made his MLS debut on March 19 where he started in Seattle's first ever game, which Seattle won 3-0 defeating the New York Red Bulls. On May 16, 2009, Hurtado celebrated his 25th birthday by scoring his first MLS goal in a 1–1 draw at FC Dallas. On February 16, 2010, Hurtado signed a permanent deal with Seattle Sounders FC. He made a total of 108 league appearances for the club, scoring one goal, before leaving the club in the winter of 2014. During his time in Seattle the club captured the U.S. Open Cup three consecutive years.

On January 15, 2014, Hurtado was traded from the Seattle Sounders to the Chicago Fire along with Patrick Ianni and the 13th overall pick in the 2014 MLS SuperDraft. In return, the Sounders acquired Jalil Anibaba, the 8th overall pick in the 2014 MLS Superdraft, and a conditional pick in the 2015 MLS SuperDraft from Chicago. After appearing in 19 matches as a starter for Chicago, Hurtado was traded to Chivas USA on August 22, 2014, in exchange for allocation money.

On December 4, 2015, it was announced that he was given a trial with Major League Soccer side New York City FC.

Hurtado joined the roster of semi-professional club Ballard FC of USL League Two in the fall of 2025 for their qualifier games for the 2026 U.S. Open Cup.

== Personal life ==
Hurtado is married to wife Daysury with whom he has one child named Paolo, born on June 19, 2009. Following the birth of Paolo, Hurtado missed the Seattle Sounders versus the New York Red Bulls game. Hurtado and his wife watched the match as Fredy Montero and Osvaldo Alonso celebrated Paolo's birth via t-shirt messages. Montero and Hurtado are good friends who first met while playing for Deportivo Cali. They often carpooled to work.

Hurtado was granted a U.S. green card in December 2010. This status qualifies him as a domestic player for MLS roster purposes.

== Honours ==
=== Seattle Sounders FC ===
- Lamar Hunt U.S. Open Cup (3): 2009, 2010, 2011
