= All-time Sporting Kansas City roster =

This list comprises all players who have participated in at least one league match for Sporting Kansas City (formerly known as Kansas City Wiz and Kansas City Wizards) since the team's first Major League Soccer season in 1996. Players who were on the roster but never played a first team game are not listed; players who appeared for the team in other competitions (US Open Cup, CONCACAF Champions League, etc.) but never actually made an MLS appearance are noted at the bottom of the page.

A "†" denotes players who only appeared in a single match.

== A ==
- (United States) Saad Abdul-Salaam
- (England) Korede Aiyegbusi
- (United States) Yari Allnut
- (Honduras) Ever Alvarado †
- (United States) Mike Ammann
- (Argentina) Emiliano Amor
- (United States) Jalil Anibaba
- (Venezuela) Bernardo Añor
- (Ghana) Emmanuel Appiah †
- (South Africa) Stephen Armstrong
- (United States) Davy Arnaud
- (Guadeloupe) Stéphane Auvray

== B ==
- (United States) Matt Besler
- (Argentina) Claudio Bieler
- (United States) Brian Bliss
- (United States) Sean Bowers
- (United States) Dustin Branan †
- (Mexico) Omar Bravo
- (United States) Chris Brown
- (United States) Chris Brunt
- (Canada) Alex Bunbury
- (United States) Teal Bunbury
- (United States) José Burciaga, Jr.
- (United States) Mike Burns
- (Uganda) Peter Byaruhanga

== C ==
- (United States) Servando Carrasco
- (Brazil) Júlio César
- (India) Sunil Chhetri
- (United States) Mark Chung
- (Honduras) Jorge Claros
- (Portugal) Nuno André Coelho
- (France) Aurélien Collin
- (Argentina) Eloy Colombano
- (United States) Jimmy Conrad
- (United States) Bobby Convey
- (Moldova) Igor Costrov
- (United States) Adam Cristman
- (Trinidad and Tobago) Daneil Cyrus

== D ==
- (United States) Nino Da Silva
- (United States) Brad Davis
- (Canada) Marcel de Jong
- (United States) Jake Dancy
- (United States) John DeBrito†
- (United States) Cesar Delgado
- (United States) Justin Detter
- (United States) Amadou Dia
- (United States) John Diffley
- (Senegal) Birahim Diop
- (Ukraine) Ihor Dotsenko
- (United States) Dom Dwyer

== E ==
- (United States) Eric Eichmann
- (Cameroon) Samuel Ekeme
- (United States) Kevin Ellis
- (Colombia) Pablo Escobar
- (Honduras) Roger Espinoza

== F ==
- (Argentina) Darío Fabbro
- (United States) Benny Feilhaber
- (United States) Narciso Fernandes
- (United States) Vicente Figueroa
- (Spain) Andreu Fontàs

== G ==
- (United States) Nick Garcia
- (United States) Josh Gardner
- (Trinidad and Tobago) Gary Glasgow
- (United States) Francisco Gomez
- (United States) Hérculez Gómez
- (Scotland) Richard Gough
- (United States) Taylor Graham
- (United States) Michael Green
- (United States) Andrew Gregor
- (United States) Matt Groenwald
- (United States) Andy Gruenebaum
- (United States) Diego Gutierrez
- Felipe Gutiérrez

== H ==
- (United States) Connor Hallisey
- (United States) Michael Harrington
- (Canada) Pat Harrington
- (Jamaica) Wolde Harris
- (United States) Kevin Hartman
- (United States) Chris Henderson
- (Hungary) Zoltán Hercegfalvi
- (United States) William Hesmer
- (Argentina) Santiago Hirsig
- (United States) Aaron Hohlbein
- (Jamaica) Jermaine Hue
- (Croatia) Goran Hunjak

== J ==
- (United States) Tahj Jakins
- (Brazil) Jéferson
- (Haiti) Mechack Jérôme
- (United States) Jack Jewsbury
- (United States) Will John
- (United States) Brian Johnson
- (United States) Eddie Johnson
- (Scotland) Mo Johnston
- (Haiti) Peterson Joseph
- (Brazil) Igor Julião

== K ==
- (Ghana) Michael Kafari
- (Sierra Leone) Kei Kamara
- (United States) Alec Kann
- (United States) Jon Kempin
- (Israel) Gadi Kinda
- (United States) Chris Klein
- (United States) Frank Klopas
- (United States) Kevin Koetters
- (Greece) Nikos Kounenakis
- (United States) Michael Kraus
- (United States) Eric Kronberg

== L ==
- (United States) Garth Lagerwey
- (United States) Alexi Lalas
- (United States) Roy Lassiter
- (United States) Jonathan Leathers
- (Spain) Cristian Lobato
- (Argentina) Claudio López
- (United States) Mikey Lopez
- (United States) Scott Lorenz †
- (Jamaica) Onandi Lowe

== M ==
- (United States) Justin Mapp
- (Chile) Luis Marín
- (Argentina) Carlos Marinelli
- (United States) Pete Marino
- (Bosnia and Herzegovina) Neven Marković
- (United States) Matt Marquess
- (Uruguay) Alex Martínez
- (United States) Rauwshan McKenzie
- (United States) Matt McKeon
- (Colombia) Jimmy Medranda
- (United States) Tim Melia
- (United States) Tony Meola
- (United States) Jamel Mitchell
- (Denmark) Miklos Molnar
- (Costa Rica) Kurt Morsink
- (Armenia) Yura Movsisyan
- (Haiti) Soni Mustivar
- (United States) Chance Myers

== N ==
- (Brazil) Paulo Nagamura
- (Hungary) Krisztián Németh
- (Denmark) Jimmy Nielsen

== O ==
- (Nigeria) Uche Okafor
- (United States) Amobi Okugo
- (Kenya) Lawrence Olum
- (United States) Ike Opara
- (United States) Bo Oshoniyi

== P ==
- (United States) Erik Palmer-Brown
- (Canada) Tyler Pasher
- (United States) Jacob Peterson
- (United States) Steve Pittman
- (United States) Nelson Pizarro
- (United States) Ryan Pore
- (United States) Cameron Porter
- (United States) Alan Prampin
- (United States) Brandon Prideaux
- (Mexico) Alan Pulido
- (United States) John Pulskamp
- (Croatia) Roberto Punčec

== Q ==
- (United States) Eric Quill
- (Spain) Jordi Quintillà

== R ==
- (Russia) Sergei Raad
- (United States) Preki Radosavljević
- (Serbia) Vuk Rašović
- (United States) Ryan Raybould
- (United States) Tommy Reasoner
- (New Zealand) Winston Reid
- (England) Paul Rideout
- (United States) Brian Roberts
- (Grenada) Craig Rocastle
- (United States) Edmundo Rodriguez
- (Spain) Oriol Rosell
- (Chile) Diego Rubio
- (Scotland) Johnny Russell
- (Rwanda) Abdul Rwatubyaye

== S ==
- (Lebanon) Soony Saad
- (Bosnia and Herzegovina) Refik Šabanadžović
- (Hungary) Dániel Sallói
- (Mexico) Richard Sánchez
- (United States) Mark Santel
- (United States) C. J. Sapong
- (United States) Luke Sassano
- (Trinidad and Tobago) Scott Sealy
- (Liberia) Dionysius Sebwe
- (United States) Damian Silvera
- (Russia) Igor Simutenkov
- (United States) Seth Sinovic
- (England) Ryan Smith
- (United States) Chris Snitko
- (Cameroon) Yann Songo'o
- (United States) Mike Sorber
- (United States) Tony Soto
- (Scotland) Kevin Souter
- (Jamaica) Khari Stephenson
- (Philippines) Martin Steuble
- (Montenegro) Miloš Stojčev
- (United States) Colton Storm
- (Finland) Antti Sumiala

== T ==
- (Zimbabwe) Vitalis Takawira
- (United States) Carey Talley
- (United States) Matt Taylor
- (United States) Michael Thomas
- (Jamaica) Shavar Thomas
- (United States) Abe Thompson
- (United States) Ryan Tinsley
- (Spain) Toni
- (Colombia) Iván Trujillo

== U ==
- (United States) Scott Uderitz

== V ==
- (Netherlands) Dave van den Bergh
- (United States) Peter Vermes
- (United States) Scott Vermillion
- (United States) Sasha Victorine

== W ==
- (United States) Tyson Wahl
- (Brazil) Diego Walsh
- (Poland) Konrad Warzycha †
- (United States) Lance Watson
- (United States) John Wilson
- (United States) David Winner
- (United States) Josh Wolff
- (United States) Paul Wright

== Z ==
- (United States) Kerry Zavagnin
- (United States) Gedion Zelalem
- (United States) Adrian Zendejas
- (United States) Sal Zizzo
- (Romania) Alex Zotincă
- (United States) Graham Zusi

== Sources ==
- "MLS All-Time MLS Player Register". Mlsnet.com. Major League Soccer. Archived from the original on 14 February 2009.
- "MLS Number Assignments Archive".
