= 2008 Kansas City Wizards season =

Kansas City Wizards
2008 season
- Head coach: Curt Onalfo
- Major League Soccer: East: 4th Overall: 6th
- USOC: Quarterfinals
- Playoffs: Conference semifinals
- Top goalscorer: League: Davy Arnaud (7); All: Davy Arnaud (8)
- Highest home attendance: 26,113
- Average home league attendance: 10,686
Home colors	Away colors

The 2008 Kansas City Wizards season was the 13th in Major League Soccer and the first season played at the temporary home CommunityAmerica Ballpark in Kansas City, Kansas. This marked the start of club's longstanding relationship with the city of Kansas City, Kansas, as the eventual new stadium the team sought out was constructed in this city.

== Team News ==
The Wizards had been seeking sites for a soccer-specific stadium, initially targeting possible locations in Johnson County, Kansas. The Wizards' new ownership identified a site at 159th Street and U.S. Route 69 in south Overland Park, Kansas as its preferred location for a stadium, but this plan was met with numerous difficulties, namely the decision of the town's mayor to pull his support for the financing of the stadium after a vote had failed to secure money for the building of youth fields at the same site.

Due to renovations of Arrowhead Stadium, the Wizards were expected to play at a temporary stadium beginning in 2007, while planning and awaiting the construction of a new facility. Yet on January 31, 2007, it was announced the Wizards would continue to play in Arrowhead in the 2007 season.

The reasons given for the return to Arrowhead were the difficulties in expanding other facilities in the area (the KC Wizards played an exhibition in the beginning of the 2007 season at the District Activities Center owned and operated by the Blue Valley School District in Overland Park, Kansas) and the delay in the Arrowhead renovation plan.

On July 27, 2007, the Kansas City Star reported that Lane4 Property Group, a developer hired by the Wizards, was moving closer to making plans final for a massive redevelopment of now-vacant Bannister Mall that was intended to include a new 18,500-seat stadium for the Wizards and 12 to 18 tournament soccer fields. Under Lane4's plan, the Bannister Mall and Benjamin Plaza shopping centers and the adjoining Benjamin Ranch property would be demolished and replaced with a mixed-use project with retail, office and residential components in addition to a possible Wizards stadium. According to MLS.net on December 14, 2007, the Wizards plans for a new stadium were approved by the Kansas City council. The target date for completion of construction for a new facility had been stated as the beginning of the 2010 season. Team owners are currently collaborating with architecture firm 360 Architecture on the design of the new stadium.

Ultimately, due to the Great Recession among other issues, the Wizards plan failed in Missouri. The aforementioned stadium—now known as Children's Mercy Park—was built in Kansas City, Kansas, near Kansas Speedway and the ballpark.

== Matches ==
=== Pre-season ===
==== Saturn Cup ====
The senior team played its first competitive match of the 2008 campaign in Norman, Oklahoma at John Crain Field on the campus of the University of Oklahoma on March 22, 2008 as part of the Saturn Cup against Real Salt Lake. The Wizards took home the hardware with the only goal of the contest coming from the head of defender Jimmy Conrad off a Carlos Marinelli free kick. This marked the second time in club history that it won the Saturn Cup.

March 22, 2008
18:05 CST

Kansas City Wizards	1–0	Real Salt Lake
Conrad 64'	(report)

Joe Crain Field
Norman, Oklahoma

==== New Mexico Cup ====
2008 Colombian newcomer Iván Trujillo scored twice against CSD Municipal the defending Liga Nacional de Guatemala champions in Albuquerque, New Mexico while the Wizards defense held the Reds scoreless, 2-0. The New Mexico Cup was played at the University of New Mexico.

May 31, 2008
20:00 CST

CSD Municipal	0–2	Kansas City Wizards
	(report)	Trujillo 31' 37'

University of New Mexico
Albuquerque, New Mexico

=== Major League Soccer ===
==== Notes ====
• Kansas City has now qualified for the playoffs in nine of their 13 seasons, both seasons since OnGoal bought the team in 2006.
• Kansas City finished the season 5-1-1 in their final seven matches, including a 3-0-0 record in their last three.
• Claudio López finished his first MLS season tied for second on the team in league goals (6) and tied for the team lead in assists (7).
• Davy Arnaud clinched the team Golden Boot after scoring two goals in his final two games.
• Five times throughout the season Kansas City scored three or more goals.
• Goalkeeper Kevin Hartman and defender Jimmy Conrad are the only Wizards to play all 2,700 minutes this season.
• Hartman, Conrad and defender Michael Harrington are the only three players to start in all 30 MLS games.
• Hartman now has 138 career wins, an MLS all-time record.
• Kerry Zavagnin's final MLS appearance came away to the Revs in the season finale and was his 237th appearance for the Wizards, a club record. He finished with 20,516 minutes played in league play, also a club record.

==== Results summary ====
Overall								Home						Away					
Pld	Pts	W	L	T	GF	GA	GD	W	L	T	GF	GA	GD	W	L	T	GF	GA	GD
30	42	11	10	9	37	39	−2	9	2	4	22	15	+7	2	8	5	15	24	−9

Last updated: Oct 25, 2008
Source: Major League Soccer
Pld = Matches played; Pts = Points; W = Matches won; T = Matches tied; L = Matches lost; GF = Goals for; GA = Goals against; GD = Goal difference

==== Results ====
Date	Opponents	H / A	Result F – A	Scorers	Attendance
March 29, 2008	D.C. United	H	2–0	Trujillo; López	10,385
April 5, 2008	Colorado Rapids	H	3–2	Conrad 2 Sealy	8,731
April 9, 2008	New England Revolution	H	1–3	Jewsbury	8,096
April 12, 2008	Houston Dynamo	H	0–0		9,627
April 20, 2008	Chicago Fire S.C.	A	1–0	Jewsbury	17,121
April 26, 2008	Toronto FC	A	0–2		20,045
May 3, 2008	Columbus Crew	A	1–2	López	10,447
May 17, 2008	New York Red Bulls	A	1–1	Conrad	15,755
May 24, 2008	Los Angeles Galaxy	A	1–3	López	24,176
June 7, 2008	Real Salt Lake	A	0–0		11,327
June 14, 2008	Columbus Crew	H	0–3		10,385
June 21, 2008	Toronto FC	A	0–0		20,293
June 28, 2008	Real Salt Lake	H	1–0	Own goal	10,385
July 4, 2008	FC Dallas	A	1–1	Sealy	16,765
July 10, 2008	New York Red Bulls	H	2–1	Conrad; Arnaud	8,773
July 17, 2008	Columbus Crew	A	3–3	Own goal Espinoza; Wolff	16,117
July 27, 2008	Chicago Fire S.C.	H	0–0		10,385
August 2, 2008	D.C. United	A	0–2		18,731
August 9, 2008	Chivas USA	H	3–2	Victorine; López; Arnaud	9,597
August 16, 2008	Colorado Rapids	A	1–2	Harrington	10,609
August 23, 2008	FC Dallas	H	1–1	Conrad	9,825
August 30, 2008	San Jose Earthquakes	A	1–2	Arnaud	10,089
September 7, 2008	Houston Dynamo	A	1–3	Arnaud	14,297
September 13, 2008	Los Angeles Galaxy	H	2–0	Wolff; Arnaud	26,113
September 20, 2008	Toronto FC	H	2–0	Jewsbury; Souter	8,270
September 27, 2008	Chivas USA	A	1–2	Wolff	14,783
October 5, 2008	Chicago Fire S.C.	H	1–1	Harrington	10,385
October 11, 2008	New England Revolution	H	1–0	Conrad	9,488
October 18, 2008	San Jose Earthquakes	H	3–2	López; Arnaud; Gomez	9,841
October 25, 2008	New England Revolution	A	3–1	López; Arnaud; Own goal	16,764

==== Detailed Summary ====
March
March 29, 2008
19:00 CST

Kansas City Wizards	2–0	D.C. United
Trujillo 47'; López 61'	(report)

Community America Ballpark
Kansas City, KS
Attendance: 10,385
Referee: Ricardo Salazar

April
April 5, 2008
16:00 CST

Kansas City Wizards	3–2	Colorado Rapids
Conrad 52' 54'; Sealy 87'	(report)	Burciaga 57'; DiRaimondo 68'

Community America Ballpark
Kansas City, KS
Attendance: 8,731
Referee: Kevin Stott

April 9, 2008
19:00 CST

Kansas City Wizards	1–3	New England Revolution
Jewsbury 28'	(report)	Own Goal (Jewsbury) 12'; Nyassi 33'; Mansally 40'

Community America Ballpark
Kansas City, KS
Attendance: 8,096
Referee: Terry Vaughn

April 12, 2008
19:00 CST

Kansas City Wizards	0–0	Houston Dynamo
	(report)

Community America Ballpark
Kansas City, KS
Attendance: 9,627
Referee: Baldomero Toledo

April 20, 2008
14:00 CST

Chicago Fire	0–1	Kansas City Wizards
	(report)	Jewsbury 4'

Toyota Park
Bridgeview, IL
Attendance: 17,121
Referee: Jair Marrufo

April 26, 2008
14:30 CST

Toronto FC	2–0	Kansas City Wizards
Guevara 56' 77'	(report)

BMO Field
Toronto, Ontario
Attendance: 20,045
Referee: Kevin Stott

May
May 3, 2008
18:30 CST

Columbus Crew	2–1	Kansas City Wizards
Moffat 4'; Rogers 34'	(report)	López 79'

Columbus Crew Stadium
Columbus, OH
Attendance: 10,447
Referee: Mark Geiger

May 17, 2008
18:30 CST

New York Red Bulls	1–1	Kansas City Wizards
Borman 81'	(report)	Conrad 20'

Giants Stadium
East Rutherford, NJ
Attendance: 15,755
Referee: Jair Marrufo

May 24, 2008
21:30 CST

Los Angeles Galaxy	3–1	Kansas City Wizards
Donovan 54'; Buddle 74'; Beckham 90+4'	(report)	López 40'

The Home Depot Center
Carson, CA
Attendance: 24,176
Referee: Michael Kennedy

June
June 7, 2008
20:00 CST

Real Salt Lake	0–0	Kansas City Wizards
	(report)

Rice-Eccles Stadium
Salt Lake City, UT
Attendance: 11,327
Referee: Ramón Hernández

June 14, 2008
19:00 CST

Kansas City Wizards	0–3	Columbus Crew
	(report)	Marshall 3'; Moreno 21' 67'

Community America Ballpark
Kansas City, KS
Attendance: 10,385
Referee: Terry Vaughn

June 21, 2008
14:30 CST

Toronto FC	0–0	Kansas City Wizards
	(report)

BMO Field
Toronto, Ontario
Attendance: 20,293
Referee: Michael Kennedy

June 28, 2008
19:00 CST

Kansas City Wizards	1–0	Real Salt Lake
Own Goal (Beltran) 89'	(report)

Community America Ballpark
Kansas City, KS
Attendance: 10,385
Referee: Alex Prus

July
July 4, 2008
18:00 CST

FC Dallas	1–1	Kansas City Wizards
Thompson 91+'	(report)	Sealy 39'

Pizza Hut Park
Frisco, TX
Attendance: 16,765
Referee: Baldomero Toledo

July 10, 2008
19:00 CST

Kansas City Wizards	2–1	New York Red Bulls
Conrad 11'; Arnaud 47'	(report)	Ángel 71'

Community America Ballpark
Kansas City, KS
Attendance: 8,773
Referee: Jasen Anno

July 17, 2008
19:00 CST

Columbus Crew	3–3	Kansas City Wizards
Schelotto 26'; Moreno 33'; Marshall 38'	(report)	Own Goal (Hejduk) 22'; Espinoza 24'; Wolff 75'

Columbus Crew Stadium
Columbus, OH
Attendance: 16,117
Referee: Abiodun Okulaja

July 27, 2008
19:00 CST

Kansas City Wizards	0–0	Chicago Fire
	(report)

Community America Ballpark
Kansas City, KS
Attendance: 10,385
Referee: Mark Geiger

August
August 2, 2008
18:30 CST

D.C. United	2–0	Kansas City Wizards
Emilio 28'; Moreno 60'	(report)

RFK Stadium
Washington, D.C.
Attendance: 18,731
Referee: Edvin Jurisevic

August 9, 2008
19:00 CST

Kansas City Wizards	3–2	Chivas USA
Victorine 22'; López 44'; Arnaud 58'	(report)	Talley 73'; Braun 82'

Community America Ballpark
Kansas City, KS
Attendance: 9,597
Referee: Ricardo Salazar

August 16, 2008
20:30 CST

Colorado Rapids	2–1	Kansas City Wizards
Casey 11' 47'	(report)	Harrington 44'

Dick's Sporting Goods Park
Commerce City, CO
Attendance: 10,609
Referee: Jorge Gonzalez

August 23, 2008
19:00 CST

Kansas City Wizards	1–1	FC Dallas
Conrad 90+2'	(report)	Rocha 7'

Community America Ballpark
Kansas City, KS
Attendance: 9,825
Referee: Mauricio Navarro

August 30, 2008
21:00 CST

San Jose Earthquakes	2–1	Kansas City Wizards
Alvarez 43'; Huckerby 83'	(report)	Arnaud 64'

Buck Shaw Stadium
Santa Clara, Ca
Attendance: 10,089
Referee: Paul Ward

September
September 7, 2008
14:00 CST

Houston Dynamo	3–1	Kansas City Wizards
Davis 28'; Jaqua 54' 67'	(report)	Arnaud 87'

Robertson Stadium
Houston, TX
Attendance: 14,297
Referee: Abiodun Okulaja

September 13, 2008
16:00 CST

Kansas City Wizards	2–0	Los Angeles Galaxy
Wolff 67'; Arnaud 69'	(report)

Arrowhead Stadium
Kansas City, MO
Attendance: 26,113
Referee: Paul Ward

September 20, 2008
19:00 CST

Kansas City Wizards	2–0	Toronto FC
Jewsbury 63' (PK); Souter 79'	(report)

Community America Ballpark
Kansas City, KS
Attendance: 8,270
Referee: Baldomero Toledo

September 27, 2008
21:30 CST

Chivas USA	2–1	Kansas City Wizards
Eskandarian 26'; Victorine 46+'	(report)	Wolff 70'

Home Depot Center
Carson, CA
Attendance: 14,783
Referee: Michael Kennedy

October
October 5, 2008
14:00 CST

Kansas City Wizards	1–1	Chicago Fire
Harrington 48'	(report)	Blanco 45+' (PK)

Community America Ballpark
Kansas City, KS
Attendance: 10,385
Referee: Ricardo Salazar

October 11, 2008
19:00 CST

Kansas City Wizards	1–0	New England Revolution
Conrad 61'	(report)

Community America Ballpark
Kansas City, KS
Attendance: 9,488
Referee: Alex Prus

October 18, 2008
19:00 CST

Kansas City Wizards	3–2	San Jose Earthquakes
López 18'; Arnaud 27'; Gomez 93+'	(report)	Sealy 20'; Salinas 71'

Community America Ballpark
Kansas City, KS
Attendance: 9,841
Referee: Terry Vaughn

October 25, 2008
18:30 CST

New England Revolution	1–3	Kansas City Wizards
Larentowicz 90'	(report)	López 28'; Arnaud 53'; Own Goal (Parkhurst) 88'

Gillette Stadium
Foxborough, MA
Attendance: 16,764
Referee: Kevin Stott

=== MLS Cup Playoffs ===
- Thanks to the Wizards late season push they qualified as the 4th seed in the Eastern Conference Playoffs. The Columbus Crew, eventual MLS Cup 2008 Champions started their winning campaign in Kansas City. Despite creating very few chances the Wizards held a 1-0 lead over the Supporters' Shield holders late into the second half. The turning point in this first leg came in the 75th minute when Wizards midfielder Herculez Gomez was shown a straight red card reducing the club to 10 men and forcing them to protect their lead rather than extending it. Crew rookie Steven Lenhart found the equalizer in stoppage time sending the sold-out crowd home disappointed.
- The second leg held no drama as Brad Evans found the net for Columbus in the 7th minute and Robbie Rogers iced it in the 57th. The Wizards could only muster two shots on goal for the entire match, both of which were saved by former Wizard William Hesmer.

==== Results ====
Date	Round	Opponents	H / A	Result F – A	Scorers	Attendance
November 1, 2008	Conference Semi-finals	Columbus Crew	H	1–1	Arnaud	10,385
November 8, 2008	Conference Semi-finals	Columbus Crew	A	0–2		11,153

==== Detailed Summary ====
MLS Cup Playoffs
Conference semifinals
November 1, 2008
19:00 CST

Kansas City Wizards	1–1	Columbus Crew
Arnaud 53'	(report)	Lenhart 92+'

Community America Ballpark
Kansas City, KS
Attendance: 10,385
Referee: Jorge Gonzalez

November 8, 2008
18:30 CST

Columbus Crew	2–0	Kansas City Wizards
Evans 7'; Rogers 58'	(report)

Columbus Crew Stadium
Columbus, OH
Attendance: 11,153
Referee: Ricardo Salazar

=== U.S. Open Cup ===
- As a result of their 2007 final standing position the Wizards were forced to play the Colorado Rapids in a qualification round. The host Wizards, playing in a high school football stadium, jumped ahead with Ryan Pore's 20th minute tally. The Rapids fought back and were leading late 2-1 thanks to goals from Herculez Gomez (traded later in the season to the Wizards), and Jacob Peterson when Iván Trujillo knotted the score at two and send the game into overtime. 30 scoreless minutes lead to a penalty shootout which saw Colorado's fourth shot clank off the crossbar and Kurt Morsink put the Wizards through to the third round.
- The third round proved no easier as the Wizards went to Cary, North Carolina to face the USL-1 Carolina Railhawks. With the Wizards trailing 2-0 in the second half coach Curt Onalfo brought on Claudio López who netted the equalizer in the 82nd minute from the spot. Iván Trujillo provided the Wizards their first goal, and in extra time found the net again before Ryan Pore iced the tough fought game a minute before the final whistle. The Railhawks finished the match with nine men after Ryan Sole was shown his second yellow in the 89th minute and defender Chad Dombrowski was served a straight red in the 120th.
- The Quarterfinals saw the Wizards visiting the Seattle Sounders (USL) at Qwest Field. Neither team could score in the first 90 minutes forcing the Wizards into their third straight AET. Following 30 more minutes of scoreless action the two clubs found themselves in the PSO- Each club missed their chance in the second round and the shooters remained perfect until round 7 when defender Tyson Wahl's (Future Seattle Sounder himself) shot was saved. Zach Scott put him the winner and Kansas City's USOC run would end.

==== Results ====
Date	Round	Opponents	H / A	Result F – A	Scorers	Attendance
June 4, 2008	Qualification Final	Colorado Rapids	H	2–2 (AET/PSO) (5–3)	Pore; Trujillo	5,228
July 1, 2008	Third Round	Carolina RailHawks	A	4–2 (AET)	Trujillo 2 López; Pore	3,116
July 8, 2008	Quarterfinals	Seattle Sounders (USL)	A	0–0 (AET/PSO) (5–6)		4,674

==== Detailed Summary ====
USOC
Qualification Final
June 4, 2008
19:00 CST

Kansas City Wizards (MLS)	2–2 (AET)	Colorado Rapids (MLS)
Pore 20'; Trujillo 86'	(report)	Gomez 36'; Peterson 57'
Penalties
Jewsbury (penalty scored); López (penalty scored); Trujillo (penalty scored); Conrad (penalty scored); Morsink (penalty scored)	5–3	Gomes dos Santos (penalty scored); Ballouchy (penalty scored); Grazier (penalty scored); Erpen (penalty missed)

Shawnee Mission North District Stadium
Overland Park, KS
Attendance: 5,228

Third round

July 1, 2008
6:30 CST

Carolina RailHawks (USL-1)	2–4 (AET)	Kansas City Wizards (MLS)
Fusilier 43'; Watson 58'; Sole (yellow card) 89' (yellow-red card) 108'; Dombrowski (red card) 120'	(report)	Trujillo 68' 94'; López 82' (PK); Morsink (yellow card) 104'; López (yellow card) 111'; Pore (yellow card) 117' (goal) 119'

WakeMed Soccer Park
Cary, North Carolina
Attendance: 3,116
Referee: Niko Bratsis (USA)

Quarterfinals

July 8, 2008
21:00 CST

Seattle Sounders (USL-1)	0–0 (AET)	Kansas City Wizards (MLS)
Penalties
Jackson (penalty scored); Le Toux (penalty missed); Treschuk (penalty scored); Sakuda (penalty scored); O'Brien (penalty scored); Kanté (penalty scored); Scott (penalty scored)	6–5	Pore (penalty scored); Conrad (penalty missed); McMahen (penalty scored); Espinoza (penalty scored); Zavagnin (penalty scored); Harrington (penalty scored); Wahl (penalty missed)

Qwest Field
Seattle, Washington
Attendance: 4,674
Referee: Jeremy Vehar (USA)

== Squad statistics ==
No.	Pos.	Name	MLS		Playoffs		USOC		Total		Minutes		Discipline	
No.	Pos.	Name	Apps	Goals	Apps	Goals	Apps	Goals	Apps	Goals	League	Total	Yellow card	Red card
2	DF	(United States) Michael Harrington	30	2	2	0	3	0	35	2	2597	3029	4	0
12	DF	(United States) Jimmy Conrad	30	6	2	0	2	0	34	6	2700	3075	4	0
1	GK	(United States) Kevin Hartman	30	0	2	0	0	0	32	0	2700	2880	0	0
14	MF	(United States) Jack Jewsbury	29	3	2	0	1	0	32	3	2548	2848	7	0
7	FW	(Argentina) Claudio López	28	6	2	0	2	1	32	7	2265	2619	4	0
22	FW	(United States) Davy Arnaud	24	7	2	1	1	0	27	8	2019	2289	8	1
17	MF	(Honduras) Roger Espinoza	22	1	2	0	2	0	26	1	1169	1487	3	2
11	MF	(Costa Rica) Kurt Morsink	21	0	0	0	2	0	23	0	1215	1313	6	0
20	DF	(United States) Tyson Wahl	16	0	2	0	3	0	21	0	1327	1790	1	0
25	DF	(United States) Jonathan Leathers	15	0	2	0	3	0	20	0	1093	1596	1	0
5	MF	(United States) Kerry Zavagnin	17	0	0	0	3	0	20	0	1116	1378	4	0
23	FW	(Colombia) Iván Trujillo	17	1	1	0	2	3	20	4	700	814	2	0
29	FW	(United States) Ryan Pore	14	0	0	0	3	2	17	2	485	807	1	0
9	MF	(United States) Sasha Victorine*	16	1	0	0	0	0	16	1	1126	1126	3	0
10	MF	(Argentina) Carlos Marinelli	15	0	0	0	1	0	16	0	778	823	4	0
15	DF	(United States) Aaron Hohlbein	14	0	0	0	1	0	15	0	1158	1278	1	0
16	FW	(United States) Josh Wolff	12	3	2	0	0	0	14	3	949	992	1	0
19	FW	(Trinidad and Tobago) Scott Sealy*	13	2	0	0	1	0	14	2	853	929	0	0
3	DF	(United States) Chance Myers	10	0	0	0	3	0	13	0	681	890	0	0
4	FW	(United States) Abe Thompson	8	0	2	0	0	0	10	0	545	673	1	0
21	MF	(United States) Herculez Gomez	8	1	1	0	0	0	9	1	594	669	0	1
26	MF	(Scotland) Kevin Souter	7	1	2	0	0	0	9	1	417	596	0	0
24	DF	(United States) Matt Marquess	5	0	1	0	2	0	8	0	381	634	0	0
16	FW	(Argentina) Eloy Colombano*	7	0	0	0	1	0	8	0	131	186	0	0
6	MF	(United States) Lance Watson	3	0	0	0	1	0	4	0	59	122	2	0
33	FW	(United States) Nelson Pizarro	3	0	0	0	1	0	4	0	40	103	0	0
18	GK	(United States) Eric Kronberg	0	0	0	0	3	0	3	0	0	360	0	0
8	MF	(United States) Ryan McMahen*	0	0	0	0	2	0	2	0	0	102	0	0
30	MF	(United States) Michael Kraus	0	0	1	0	1	0	2	0	0	88	0	0
13	DF	(United States) Rauwshan McKenzie	0	0	0	0	1	0	1	0	0	45	0	0

Final Statistics
*left club in season

== Squad ==
=== First-team squad ===
As of OCT 25, 2008 Note: Flags indicate national team as defined under FIFA eligibility rules; some limited exceptions apply. Players may hold more than one non-FIFA nationality.

No.	Pos.	Nation	Player
1	GK	USA	Kevin Hartman
2	DF	USA	Michael Harrington
3	DF	USA	Chance Myers
4	FW	USA	Abe Thompson
5	MF	USA	Kerry Zavagnin
6	MF	USA	Lance Watson
7	FW	ARG	Claudio López
10	MF	ARG	Carlos Marinelli
11	MF	CRC	Kurt Morsink
12	DF	USA	Jimmy Conrad (Captain)
13	DF	USA	Rauwshan McKenzie
14	DF	USA	Jack Jewsbury
15	DF	USA	Aaron Hohlbein
16	FW	USA	Josh Wolff

No.	Pos.	Nation	Player
17	MF	HON	Roger Espinoza
18	GK	USA	Eric Kronberg
20	DF	USA	Tyson Wahl
21	FW	USA	Herculez Gomez
22	MF	USA	Davy Arnaud
23	FW	COL	Iván Trujillo
24	DF	USA	Matt Marquess
25	DF	USA	Jonathan Leathers
26	MF	SCO	Kevin Souter
29	FW	USA	Ryan Pore
30	MF	USA	Michael Kraus
31	GK	USA	Boris Pardo
32	GK	USA	Andrew Kartunen
33	MF	USA	Nelson Pizarro

=== Transfers ===
==== In ====
Note: Flags indicate national team as defined under FIFA eligibility rules; some limited exceptions apply. Players may hold more than one non-FIFA nationality.

No.	Pos.	Nation	Player
3	DF	USA	Chance Myers (2008 MLS SuperDraft, 1st Overall)
7	FW	ARG	Claudio López (from Racing Club de Avellaneda, Signed Designated Player)
13	DF	USA	Rauwshan McKenzie (from 2008 MLS SuperDraft, 53rd Overall)
17	MF	HON	Roger Espinoza (from 2008 MLS SuperDraft, 11th Overall)
23	FW	COL	Iván Trujillo (from La Equidad, Signed)

No.	Pos.	Nation	Player
24	DF	USA	Matt Marquess (from 2008 MLS SuperDraft, 39th Overall)
25	DF	USA	Jonathan Leathers (from 2008 MLS SuperDraft, 25th Overall)
26	MF	SCO	Kevin Souter (from Free)
33	MF	USA	Nelson Pizarro (from Free)
16	FW	USA	Josh Wolff (from 1860 Munich, Signed)
4	FW	USA	Abe Thompson (from FC Dallas, Trade)
21	FW	USA	Herculez Gomez (from Colorado Rapids, Trade)

==== Out ====
Note: Flags indicate national team as defined under FIFA eligibility rules; some limited exceptions apply. Players may hold more than one non-FIFA nationality.

No.	Pos.	Nation	Player
7	FW	USA	Eddie Johnson (to Fulham FC, Transfer)
3	DF	USA	Nick Garcia (to San Jose Earthquakes, Trade for 1st Overall 2008 MLS SuperDraft)
6	DF	USA	Jose Burciaga Jr. (to Colorado Rapids, Trade for 2nd Round 2008 MLS SuperDraft)
16	FW	ARG	Eloy Colombano (Released)
19	FW	TRI	Scott Sealy (to San Jose Earthquakes, Allocation Money)
8	MF	USA	Ryan McMahen (Released)
9	MF	USA	Sasha Victorine (to Chivas USA, Allocation Money)
