= 2009 Kansas City Wizards season =

Kansas City Wizards
2009 season
- Head coach: Curt Onalfo (dismissed); Peter Vermes
- Major League Soccer: East: 6th Overall: 13th
- U.S. Open Cup: Quarterfinals
- Superliga: Group Stage
- Top goalscorer: League: Josh Wolff (11); All: Josh Wolff (11)
- Highest home attendance: 11,906
- Average home league attendance: 10,053
Home colors	Away colors

The 2009 Kansas City Wizards season was the club's 14th in MLS and the second season played at their temporary home Community America Ballpark. It started on March 21, 2009 with a 3-2 home loss to Toronto FC and ended on October 22, with a 2-2 draw against D.C. United, also at home.

== Competitions ==
=== Major League Soccer ===
==== Standings ====
Pos	Team	Pld	W	L	T	GF	GA	GD	Pts	Qualification
1	Columbus Crew	30	13	7	10	41	31	+10	49	MLS Cup Playoffs
2	Chicago Fire	30	11	7	12	39	34	+5	45	MLS Cup Playoffs
3	New England Revolution	30	11	10	9	33	37	−4	42	MLS Cup Playoffs
4	D.C. United	30	9	8	13	43	44	−1	40	
5	Toronto FC	30	10	11	9	37	46	−9	39	
6	Kansas City Wizards	30	8	13	9	33	42	−9	33	
7	New York Red Bulls	30	5	19	6	27	47	−20	21	

Source: MLS

Pos	Team	Pld	W	L	T	GF	GA	GD	Pts	Qualification
1	Columbus Crew (S)	30	13	7	10	41	31	+10	49	CONCACAF Champions League
2	LA Galaxy	30	12	6	12	36	31	+5	48	CONCACAF Champions League
3	Houston Dynamo	30	13	8	9	39	29	+10	48	North American SuperLiga
4	Seattle Sounders FC	30	12	7	11	38	29	+9	47	CONCACAF Champions League
5	Chicago Fire	30	11	7	12	39	34	+5	45	North American SuperLiga
6	Chivas USA	30	13	11	6	34	31	+3	45	North American SuperLiga
7	New England Revolution	30	11	10	9	33	37	−4	42	North American SuperLiga
8	Real Salt Lake (C)	30	11	12	7	43	35	+8	40	CONCACAF Champions League
9	Colorado Rapids	30	10	10	10	42	38	+4	40	
10	D.C. United	30	9	8	13	43	44	−1	40	
11	FC Dallas	30	11	13	6	50	47	+3	39	
12	Toronto FC	30	10	11	9	37	46	−9	39	CONCACAF Champions League
13	Kansas City Wizards	30	8	13	9	33	42	−9	33	
14	San Jose Earthquakes	30	7	14	9	36	50	−14	30	
15	New York Red Bulls	30	5	19	6	27	47	−20	21	

Source: MLS
Rules for classification: 1) points; 2) head-to-head record; 3) goal difference; 4) number of goals scored
(C) Champions; (S) Supporters' Shield

==== Points ====
Overall								Home						Away					
Pld	Pts	W	L	T	GF	GA	GD	W	L	T	GF	GA	GD	W	L	T	GF	GA	GD
30	33	8	13	9	33	42	−9	4	6	5	18	20	−2	4	7	4	15	22	−7

Last updated: October 25, 2009
Source: Major League Soccer
Pld = Matches played; Pts = Points; W = Matches won; T = Matches tied; L = Matches lost; GF = Goals for; GA = Goals against; GD = Goal difference

==== Summary ====
- March

The Wizards broke pre-season camp missing many key components with newly acquired forward Adam Cristman going down with a fifth metatarsal fracture, and defender Chance Myers (1st overall 2008 draft pick) oddly suffering exactly the same injury in the final week of training. Over the first two weeks of the regular season the Wizards would lose the services of seven total players from their normal 18 including the two previously mentioned and; Davy Arnaud, Josh Wolff, Kevin Souter, Eric Kronberg, and Herculez Gomez. These injuries would provide many opportunities for backups. Lance Watson took advantage and found himself playing right back in week 2 @ Colorado and impressed head coach Curt Anolfo enough to secure the spot. Rookie Graham Zusi filled the void out wide in right of midfield and was exposed in the opening loss to Toronto to then rebound in the second match before being sidelined with his own injury, a hamstring strain that would keep him out for all of April. After the disappointing opener the Wizards traveled to Colorado two days behind a blizzard that brought 14 inches of snow to Denver. The two clubs played in cold temperatures in front of a small crowd (at the same time as the USMNT) before the final whistle signaled a 2-1 victory to the Rapids. The Wizards fielded 4 starters in Colorado who had not even seen the field the week before. The lone goal by the Wizards came from seldom used back-up striker Michael Kraus, his first goal in MLS play.

MLS All Time Saves Leader - Kevin Hartman (1,136)

- April

April showers brought more bad weather and injuries to the club. Michael Harrington joined Zusi as the most recently injured when he also went down in training with a hamstring strain. The patchwork defense returned home for the first Sunday match of the season featuring rookie and 1st round pick Matt Besler in the back line against a then potent attacking SJ Earthquakes team. For the second week in a row the club faced difficult weather conditions (freezing rain and wind gusts up to 40 MPH). They responded with a better effort, shutting out the Quakes and securing their first win of the season 2-0. Week 4 brought a trip to Seattle to face the undefeated expansion Sounders. The Wizards controlled the first half despite not scoring and saw the Sounders go down a man in the 29th minute when goalkeeper Kasey Keller used his hands outside of the box to deflect a scoring chance from the fast breaking Herculez Gomez. The Wizards couldn't capitalize in the first half and the Sounders looked the better side in the second half until Davy Arnaud launched a game-winning missile from 30 yards out in the 80th minute to deliver the first goal surrendered and first loss to Seattle. The road trip continued onto the Eastern Conference leading Chicago Fire. The Fire sharply outplayed the relatively sluggish Wizards for the entire first half and most of the second half, with Brian McBride scoring two early goals. However goalkeeper Kevin Hartman made several spectacular saves to prevent Chicago from any further scoring, and the Wizards were able to muster a comeback late in the second half, with Josh Wolff scoring two goals of his own to equalize the match 2-2. The Wizards welcomed New York to town for the first ever ESPN telecast from Community America Ballpark, Red Bull defender Carlos Johnson took Herculez Gomez down in the box just two minutes into the match and received a red card for denying an obvious goal-scoring opportunity. Neither team played particularly well following the ejection of Johnson but Kansas City got the three points as a result of Claudio López slotting the resulting penalty kick past newly reinstated Jon Conway, who had served the longest performance-enhancing drug suspension ever in Major League Soccer. Jack Jewsbury didn't make the final road trip of April to Toronto as a result of the concussion he suffered just days earlier. The Wizards missed their holding midfielder as TFC played their first match under interim manager Chris Cummins as John Carver stepped down. Toronto was also missing star player Dwayne De Rosario (injured) but Danny Dichio's scramble goal in the 54th minute and TFC's clean sheet was enough to end the Wizards 18 regular season game streak of scoring at least one goal (second longest in the team history). Curt Onalfo's April ended with his family being in a car wreck on the way to the final home game and him personally being fined for comments he made to the officials following the lost in Toronto which he explained was a result of having his passport stolen just days before the trip and having to fly to Colorado to secure a new one in person(The fine was paid for by the club's supporters group as a sign of respect for all he had been through).

Cauldron Man of the Month Award - March & April - Kevin Hartman
MLS Player of the Week - Week 5 - Josh Wolff

- May

May began with disappointment as the club once again fell behind an opponent in the first half to only share the points with a second half equalizer. This first occurrence was when resurgent D.C. United visited for a rare Wednesday night match, despite creating many early chances the Wizards faltered and found themselves behind only to see Josh Wolff rescue a point on a play in which he appeared to be offside. The following Saturday the Wizards would aid Columbus in winning their first match and celebrating the Party like it's 1999 promotion that highlighted the tenth season of Columbus Crew Stadium. Wolff would score his fourth goal of the season but it proved too little too late despite the excellent service from Jack Jewsbury. Goalkeeper Kevin El Gato Hartman tallied 7 more saves as the Wizards surprised host Salt Lake handing them their first ever regular season loss in Rio Tinto Stadium. Inspired striker Josh Wolff remained on fire as he netted his fifth and sixth goals of the season pushing the club to their first win in May and second road shutout victory of the season. (Reserves News) The Swope Park Rangers welcomed back Doug DeMartin beating the Kansas City Brass 7-0, this marked a resurgence as goals came from the likes of struggling first teamers Herculez Gomez (2), Michael Kraus (2), and Graham Zusi returning from injury. There had been some hope that Adam Cristman could see the field but instead Kevin Souter and Abe Thompson appeared up top. The club's final home match of May brought in the league leaders Chivas USA on what also happened to be Dog's Night Out at the stadium. The Wizards, to form, didn't get it going until the second half and took the lead on Claudio López's Goal of the Week free kick that beat Zach Thornton. Despite great shot stopping from Kevin Hartman the Wizards gave up the equalizer just minutes later and were forced to defend when Wolff was ejected for an attempted head-butt in the 68th minute, Santiago Hirsig also found himself hitting the showers early as the team played with 9 men for the final 7 minutes. The draw marked the first time in six appearances that Chivas has gotten a single point from their travels to Kansas City. Gregg Berhalter received a sending off after denying Claudio López an obvious goal scoring opportunity in the 59th minute when he held Lopez's jersey for dear life, despite the man advantage it took a rather adventitious miss struck header that was redirected by Arnaud to put the club ahead. Arnaud's 84th-minute goal was the club's 7th scored following the 75th minute of matches and the 13th scored in the second half. Both were league records until Jack Jewsbury gave possession away and Edson Buddle brought The Galaxy even three minutes later for the shared points.

Cauldron Man of the Month Award - May - Josh Wolff
MLS Player of the Week - Week 9 - Josh Wolff
MLS Sierra Mist Goal of the Week - Week 10 - Claudio López
MLS Save of the Week - Week 11 - Kevin Hartman

- June

The busy month of June kicked off at home with the defending MLS Cup Champion Columbus Crew sweeping the season series and tie breaker despite playing most of the second half down a man. The Wizards treated the home fans to their best game to date just a week after arguably their worst by defeating the Revs 3-1. Davy Arnaud's streaking run and finish won goal of the week and launched the club into a first half scoring frenzy, when Emmanuel Osei was ejected in the 31st minute it was the fourth consecutive match that the Wizards had played in where either side had been shown a red card. The game marked the beginning of a three-week league break for play in the Superliga and U.S. Open Cup. Superliga kicked off versus F.C. Atlas in St. Louis as the sister clubs played a scoreless draw out in serious heat on father's day, Roger Espinoza was shown a late red card on a questionable challenge in the attacking end. Game two of Group B brought a visit to New England and one more point away from home as the Wizards equalized late with the own goal to draw the Revs 1-1. The club returned home only needing a draw against Santos Laguna to advance to the knockout round however in front of many away supporters Santos iced the tough fought match with a third goal 6 minutes into stoppage time. The match also marked the seventh consecutive competitive match that the Wizards had played where a red card was shown, in that time period the Wizards were shown 4 while their opponents received a shocking 5. On the final day of June the club managed only their second victory since May 16 by beating USL-1 Minnesota Thunder on PK's in the U.S. Open Cup after the Thunder fought back twice to equalize.

Cauldron Man of the Month Award - June - Santiago Hirsig
MLS Sierra Mist Goal of the Week - Week 13 - Davy Arnaud

- July

Independence Day saw the club hosting the table leading Houston Dynamo in what would be the latest kickoff time for a home match all season (8:00 PM local). Despite another sell out crowd the team could not score and fell to Houston 1-0. The team would continue to struggle to score goals (missing starters Davy Arnaud (USA), Jimmy Conrad (USA), and Roger Espinoza (HON) who were representing their national teams at the CONCACAF Gold Cup) failing to score in Seattle or New England and being bounced out of the U.S. Open Cup at the same time. With nothing left but the League to focus on the team had two full weeks to prepare for David Beckham and LA Galaxy, The Wizards captured the early lead with Claudio Lopez's amazing Goal of the week winning shot from mid field. Landon Donovan would equalize moments later and the Wizards wouldn't see another point earned for 46 days.

Cauldron Man of the Month Award - July - Kevin Hartman
MLS Sierra Mist Goal of the Week - Week 19 - Claudio López

- August

Curt Onalfo found himself out of work following the club's 6-0 loss at Dallas. Technical Director Peter Vermes called his own number and took control of the manager duties after releasing Coach Onalfo but he experienced similar results as the club refused to score a single goal through the month of August. Being out scored 10-0 for the month the Wizards dropped home matches to Chicago and Salt Lake while collecting 8 yellows and 2 straight reds, even with the four losses the Wizards remained in sixth place in the east thanks to an even worse season for New York.

Cauldron Man of the Month Award - August - Lance Watson

- September

A visit to friendly Gillette Stadium was all that the club needed to open up the flood gates. The Wizards moved their all-time record at Gillette Stadium to 7-1-5 with the 4-2 victory over New England. The I-95 Road Trip continued down to the nation's capital mid-week where outplayed D.C. United escaped with three points despite KCW controlling much of the match and nearly scoring a handful of goals. New York welcomed the resurgent Wizards to town and gave them an early Josh Wolff goal that the defense held to steal the 1-0 victory while Kevin Hartman registered his first clean sheet in 7 league matches.

Cauldron Man of the Month Award - September -
MLS Player of the Week - Week 25 - Josh Wolff

==== Results ====
March 21, 2009	Kansas City Wizards	2–3	Toronto FC	Kansas City, Kansas
	Jack Jewsbury (yellow card) 39'; Davy Arnaud 56'; Davy Arnaud 56'	(report)	Jim Brennan 33'; Rohan Ricketts (yellow card) 46+'; Amado Guevara 53'; Amado Guevara 62'	Stadium: CommunityAmerica Ballpark; Attendance: 10,385; Referee: Jorge Gonzalez

March 28, 2009	Colorado Rapids	2–1	Kansas City Wizards	Commerce City, Colorado
	Cory Gibbs (yellow card) 22'; Terry Cooke 65'; Kosuke Kimura (yellow card) 67'; Omar Cummings 74'	(report)	Michael Kraus 63'; Jonathan Leathers (yellow card) 64'; Herculez Gomez (yellow card) 82'	Stadium: Dick's Sporting Goods Park; Attendance: 11,885; Referee: Ricardo Salazar

April 5, 2009	Kansas City Wizards	2–0	San Jose Earthquakes	Kansas City, Kansas
	Aaron Hohlbein 28'; Claudio López 78'; Herculez Gomez (yellow card) 92+'	(report)	Darren Huckerby (yellow card) 30'; Arturo Alvarez (yellow card) 34'	Stadium: CommunityAmerica Ballpark; Attendance: 6,922; Referee: Edvin Jurisevic

April 11, 2009	Seattle Sounders FC	0–1	Kansas City Wizards	Seattle, Washington
	Brad Evans (yellow card) 4'; Kasey Keller (red card) 29'	Report	Jack Jewsbury (yellow card) 4'; Michael Kraus (yellow card) 71'; Davy Arnaud 80'; Kevin Hartman (yellow card) 91'	Stadium: Qwest Field; Attendance: 28,746; Referee: Abiodun Okulaja

April 18, 2009	Chicago Fire	2–2	Kansas City Wizards	Bridgeview, Illinois
	Brian McBride 13'; Brian McBride 20'; Bakary Soumare (yellow card) 70'	(report)	Claudio López (yellow card) 64'; Josh Wolff (yellow card) 66'; Josh Wolff 78'; Josh Wolff 89'	Stadium: Toyota Park; Attendance: 10,782; Referee: Hilario Grajeda

April 23, 2009	Kansas City Wizards	1–0	New York Red Bulls	Kansas City, Kansas
	Claudio López 3' (pen.); Jimmy Conrad (yellow card) 29'; Matt Besler (yellow card) 64'	(report)	Carlos Johnson (red card) 2'	Stadium: CommunityAmerica Ballpark; Attendance: 10,385; Referee: Michael Kennedy

April 26, 2009	Toronto FC	1–0	Kansas City Wizards	Toronto, Ontario Canada
	Pablo Vitti (yellow card) 52'; Danny Dichio 54'	(report)	Davy Arnaud (yellow card) 76'	Stadium: BMO Field; Attendance: 20,056; Referee: Paul Ward

May 6, 2009	Kansas City Wizards	1–1	D.C. United	Kansas City, Kansas
	Jack Jewsbury (yellow card) 23'; Josh Wolff 52'; Lance Watson (yellow card) 56'; Roger Espinoza (yellow card) 82'	(report)	Rodney Wallace 27'; Brandon Barklage (yellow card) 29'; Avery John (yellow card) 71'	Stadium: CommunityAmerica Ballpark; Attendance: 9,077; Referee: Edvin Jurisevic

May 9, 2009	Columbus Crew	3–2	Kansas City Wizards	Columbus, Ohio
	Emmanuel Ekpo 38'; Guillermo Barros Schelotto 55'; Frankie Hejduk (yellow card) 68'; Eddie Gaven 78'; Andy Gruenebaum (yellow card) 91+'	(report)	Lance Watson (yellow card) 47'; Claudio López 51'; Roger Espinoza (yellow card) 67'; Matt Besler (yellow card) 73'; Josh Wolff 79'	Stadium: Columbus Crew Stadium; Attendance: 14,271; Referee: Jorge Gonzalez

May 16, 2009	Real Salt Lake	0–2	Kansas City Wizards	Sandy, Utah
	Will Johnson (yellow card) 73'; Robbie Russell (yellow card) 89'	(report)	Josh Wolff 20'; Roger Espinoza (yellow card) 22'; Matt Besler (yellow card) 24'; Davy Arnaud (yellow card) 40'; Josh Wolff 67'	Stadium: Rio Tinto Stadium; Attendance: 19,340; Referee: Yader Reyes

May 23, 2009	Kansas City Wizards	1–1	Chivas USA	Kansas City, Kansas
	Claudio López 56'; Josh Wolff (red card) 68'; Jack Jewsbury (yellow card) 70'; Herculez Gomez (yellow card) 75'; Santiago Hirsig (yellow card) 32' (yellow-red card) 83'	(report)	Atiba Harris (yellow card) 32'; Eduardo Lillingston 64'; Mariano Trujillo (yellow card) 68'	Stadium: CommunityAmerica Ballpark; Attendance: 10,385; Referee: Jasen Anno

May 30, 2009	Los Angeles Galaxy	1–1	Kansas City Wizards	Carson, California
	A. J. DeLaGarza (yellow card) 57'; Gregg Berhalter (red card) 59'; Edson Buddle 87'	(report)	Jimmy Conrad (yellow card) 47'; Davy Arnaud (yellow card) 78'; Davy Arnaud 84'; Lance Watson (yellow card) 92'	Stadium: The Home Depot Center; Attendance: 19,673; Referee: Terry Vaughn

June 6, 2009	Kansas City Wizards	0–2	Columbus Crew	Kansas City, Kansas
	Davy Arnaud (yellow card) 35'; Claudio López (yellow card) 42'	Report	Guillermo Barros Schelotto 14' 64' (pen.); Danny O'Rourke (yellow card) 17'; Chad Marshall (red card) 51'; Andy Gruenebaum (yellow card) 91'	Stadium: CommunityAmerica Ballpark; Attendance: 10,385; Referee: Baldomero Toledo

June 13, 2009	Kansas City Wizards	3–1	New England Revolution	Kansas City, Kansas
	Davy Arnaud 19'; Claudio López (yellow card) 31'; Own goal 36'; Aaron Hohlbein 39'	(report)	Pat Phelan (yellow card) 13'; Shalrie Joseph 28'; Emmanuel Osei (red card) 31'; Kevin Alston (yellow card) 38'; Darrius Barnes (yellow card) 83'	Stadium: CommunityAmerica Ballpark; Attendance: 10,385; Referee: Ricardo Salazar

July 4, 2009	Kansas City Wizards	0–1	Houston Dynamo	Kansas City, Kansas
		(results)	Kei Kamara 18'; Mike Chabala (yellow card) 45+'; Bobby Boswell (yellow card) 49'; Geoff Cameron (yellow card) 94'	Stadium: CommunityAmerica Ballpark; Attendance: 10,385; Referee: Hilario Grajeda

July 11, 2009	New England Revolution	0–0	Kansas City Wizards	Foxborough, Massachusetts
	Kevin Alston (yellow card) 24'; Jeff Larentowicz (yellow card) 33'	(results)	Jack Jewsbury (yellow card) 33'; Michael Harrington (yellow card) 53'; Lance Watson (red card) 81'	Stadium: Gillette Stadium; Referee: Baldomero Toledo

July 25, 2009	Kansas City Wizards	1–1	Los Angeles Galaxy	Kansas City, Kansas
	Lopez 26'	Report	Donovan 33'; Gonzalez (yellow card) 51'	Stadium: CommunityAmerica Ballpark; Attendance: 11,906; Referee: Terry Vaughn

August 1, 2009	FC Dallas	6–0	Kansas City Wizards	Frisco, Texas
	Cunningham 39'; Ferreira 42'; Cunningham 66' (pen.); Cunningham 75'; Ferreira 78'; Cunningham 89'	Report	Arnaud (yellow card) 49'; Wolff (yellow card) 62'; López (red card) 68'	Stadium: Pizza Hut Park; Attendance: 10,317; Referee: Andrew Chapin

August 16, 2009	Kansas City Wizards	0–2	Chicago Fire	Kansas City, Kansas
	Hirsig (yellow card) 68'; Hercegfalvi (red card) 85'	Report	Rolfe 13'; Mapp (yellow card) 45'; Banner 89'; Pause (yellow card) 91+'	Stadium: CommunityAmerica Ballpark; Attendance: 9,974; Referee: Jorge Gonzalez

August 22, 2009	San Jose Earthquakes	1–0	Kansas City Wizards	Santa Clara, California
	Hernandez (yellow card) 52'; Alvarez (yellow card) 81'; Wondolowski 93+'; Luiz (yellow card) 94+'	Report	Arnaud (yellow card) 87'; Lopez (yellow card) 90'; Besler (yellow card) 91+'	Stadium: Buck Shaw Stadium; Attendance: 9,031; Referee: Ricardo Salazar

August 29, 2009	Kansas City Wizards	0–1	Real Salt Lake	Kansas City, Kansas
	Cristman (yellow card) 16'; Hirsig (yellow card) 87'	Report	Campos 18'; Grabavoy (red card) 42'; Beckerman (yellow card) 44'; Wingert (yellow card) 78'	Stadium: CommunityAmerica Ballpark; Attendance: 9,924; Referee: Mark Geiger

September 5, 2009	New England Revolution	2–4	Kansas City Wizards	Foxborough, Massachusetts
	Joseph (red card) 23'; Thompson (yellow card) 50'; Jankauskas 64'; Dube 81'	Report	López 3'; Heaps 29' (o.g.); Watson (yellow card) 63'; Wolff 73'; Wolff 91+'	Stadium: Gillette Stadium; Attendance: 9,489; Referee: Jasen Anno

September 9, 2009	D.C. United	1–0	Kansas City Wizards	Washington, D.C. USA
	Gomez (yellow card) 27'; Emilio 39'; John (yellow card) 84'; Wicks (yellow card) 93+'	Report	Harrington (yellow card) 69'; Besler (yellow card) 74'; Myers (yellow card) 81' (yellow-red card) 86'	Stadium: Robert F. Kennedy Memorial Stadium; Attendance: 8,033; Referee: Terry Vaughn

September 12, 2009	New York Red Bulls	0–1	Kansas City Wizards	East Rutherford, New Jersey
	Stammler (yellow card) 37'; Johnson (yellow card) 61'	Report	Wolff 10'; Hirsig (yellow card) 41'; Leathers (yellow card) 47'; Jewsbury (yellow card) 74'; Hartman (yellow card) 91+'	Stadium: Giants Stadium; Attendance: 10,234; Referee: Mark Geiger

September 19, 2009	Kansas City Wizards	3–2	FC Dallas	Kansas City, Kansas
	Hirsig 9'; Morsink (yellow card) 19'; Wolff 77'; Conrad 80'; López (yellow card) 93+'	Report	Chavez (yellow card) 13'; McCarty 44'; McCarty (yellow card) 45'; Cunningham 54'; Ricchetti (yellow card) 89'	Stadium: CommunityAmerica Ballpark; Attendance: 10,385; Referee: Jeff Gontarek

September 26, 2009	Kansas City Wizards	0–0	Colorado Rapids	Kansas City, Kansas
	Harrington (yellow card) 75'	Report	Ballouchy (yellow card) 74'; Kimura (yellow card) 93+'; Casey (yellow card) 95+'	Stadium: CommunityAmerica Ballpark; Attendance: 9,784; Referee: Silviu Petrescu

October 4, 2009	Houston Dynamo	1–1	Kansas City Wizards	Houston, Texas
	Hainault (yellow card) 2'; Weaver (red card) 17'; Mullan (yellow card) 18'; Landin 26'; Chabala (yellow card) 88'	Report	Leathers (yellow card) 46'; Kamara (yellow card) 49'; Hercegfalvi 73'	Stadium: Robertson Stadium; Attendance: 16,854; Referee: Jorge Gonzalez

October 10, 2009	Chivas USA	2–0	Kansas City Wizards	Carson, California
	Braun 72'; Kljestan 74'; Cuesta (yellow card) 78'	Report	Harrington (yellow card) 36'; Arnaud (yellow card) 90'	Stadium: The Home Depot Center; Attendance: 12,923; Referee: Yader Reyes

October 17, 2009	Kansas City Wizards	2–3	Seattle Sounders FC	Kansas City, Kansas
19:30 CST	Hercegfalvi 51'; Wolff 53'	Report	Marshall 27'; Vagenas (yellow card) 45'; Levesque 69'; Jaqua 76'	Stadium: CommunityAmerica Ballpark; Attendance: 10,135; Referee: Mark Geiger

October 22, 2009	Kansas City Wizards	2–2	D.C. United	Kansas City, Kansas
	Hercegfalvi (yellow card) 25'; Kamara 30'; Marquess (yellow card) 65'; Lopez 92+' (pen.)	Report	Moreno 67'; Olsen (yellow card) 73'; James 82'; Fred (red card) 92+'	Stadium: CommunityAmerica Ballpark; Attendance: 10,385; Referee: Ricardo Salazar

=== Superliga ===
June 21, 2009 Group Stage	Kansas City Wizards	0–0	F.C. Atlas	Saint Louis, Missouri
	Jack Jewsbury (yellow card) 37'; Aaron Hohlbein (yellow card) 41'; Santiago Hirsig (yellow card) 82'; Roger Espinoza (red card) 94'	(report)	Hugo Ayala (yellow card) 41'; Ricardo Jimenez (yellow card) 60'	Stadium: Hermann Stadium; Attendance: 5,278; Referee: Joel Aguilar

June 24, 2009 Group Stage	New England Revolution	1–1	Kansas City Wizards	Foxborough, Massachusetts
	Michael Videira (red card) 34'; Kheli Dube 46'	(report)	Jonathan Leathers (yellow card) 28'; Abe Thompson (yellow card) 44'; Own goal 85'	Stadium: Gillette Stadium; Referee: Jorge Gonzalez

June 28, 2009 Group Stage	Kansas City Wizards	1–3	Santos Laguna	Kansas City, Kansas
	Roger Espinoza (yellow card) 50'; Claudio Lopez 80'; Davy Arnaud (yellow card) 82'; Michael Kraus (red card) 87'	(report)	Jorge Iván Estrada (yellow card) 39'; Jorge Barrera (yellow card) 55'; Agustín Enrique Herrera 61'; Vicente Matías Vuoso 74'; Christian Sánchez (yellow card) 78'; Johnny Garcia (red card) 87'; Juan Pablo Rodriguez 96'	Stadium: Community America Ballpark; Attendance: 10,385; Referee: Jose Gaspar Molina

=== U.S. Open Cup ===
June 30, 2009 Third Round	Minnesota Thunder	3–3 (a.e.t.) (2–4 p)	Kansas City Wizards	Blaine, Minnesota
	Ricardo Sánchez 41' (pen.) 84' (pen.); Melvin Tarley 115'; Ricardo Sánchez (yellow card) 73'; Brian Cvilikas (yellow card) 50'; Andres Arango (yellow card) 56'; Melvin Tarley (yellow card) 85'	(report)	Michael Kraus 17'; Abe Thompson 20' (pen.); Kurt Morsink (yellow card) 83'; Josh Wolff (yellow card) 103'; Rauwshan McKenzie 105+'	Stadium: National Sports Center; Attendance: 3,878; Referee: Chris Penso
	Penalties
	Jonathan Greenfield (penalty scored); Ricardo Sánchez (penalty scored); Jeremiah Bass (penalty missed); Dale Weiler (penalty missed)		Claudio López (penalty scored); Josh Wolff (penalty scored); Abe Thompson (penalty scored); Herculez Gomez (penalty scored)

July 7, 2009 Quarterfinals	Seattle Sounders FC	1–0	Kansas City Wizards	Tukwila, Washington
	Fredy Montero (yellow card) 79'; Sebastien Le Toux 89' (pen.)	Report	Santiago Hirsig (yellow card) 76' (red card) 92+'	Stadium: Starfire Sports Complex; Attendance: 4,352; Referee: Abiodon Okulaja

== Statistics ==
No.	Pos.	Name	MLS		Superliga		USOC		Playoffs		Total		Minutes		Discipline	
No.	Pos.	Name	Apps	Goals	Apps	Goals	Apps	Goals	Apps	Goals	Apps	Goals	League	Total	Yellow card	Red card
1	GK	(United States) Kevin Hartman	**30**	0	3	0	1	0	0	0	**34**	0	**2700**	**3060**	2	0
2	DF	(United States) Michael Harrington	27	0	3	0	2	0	0	0	32	0	1682	1958	4	0
3	DF	(United States) Chance Myers	6	0	0	0	0	0	0	0	6	0	165	165	2	1
4	FW	(United States) Abe Thompson*	8	0	2	0	2	1	0	0	12	1	157	424	1	0
5	DF	(United States) Matt Besler	28	0	3	0	1	0	0	0	32	0	2236	2582	5	0
6	DF	(United States) Lance Watson	20	0	2	0	2	0	0	0	24	0	1649	1949	4	1
7	FW	(Argentina) Claudio López	29	7	3	**1**	2	0	0	0	**34**	8	2501	2776	5	1
9	FW	(United States) Adam Cristman	5	0	0	0	0	0	0	0	5	0	213	213	1	0
10	MF	(Argentina) Santiago Hirsig	26	1	3	0	1	0	0	0	30	1	2110	2465	8	**2**
11	MF	(Costa Rica) Kurt Morsink	5	0	1	0	1	0	0	0	7	0	154	279	2	0
12	DF	(United States) Jimmy Conrad	24	1	2	0	0	0	0	0	26	1	2160	2295	2	0
13	DF	(United States) Rauwshan McKenzie	5	0	2	0	2	1	0	0	9	1	437	782	0	0
14	MF	(United States) Jack Jewsbury	28	0	3	0	1	0	0	0	32	0	2451	2811	7	0
15	DF	(United States) Aaron Hohlbein	22	2	3	0	1	0	0	0	26	2	1867	2196	1	0
16	FW	(United States) Josh Wolff	27	**11**	3	0	2	0	0	0	32	**11**	2348	2730	3	1
17	MF	(Honduras) Roger Espinoza	16	0	2	0	1	0	0	0	19	0	635	897	4	1
18	GK	(United States) Eric Kronberg	0	0	0	0	0	0	0	0	0	0	0	0	0	0
20	FW	(Hungary) Zoltán Hercegfalvi	10	2	0	0	0	0	0	0	10	2	298	298	1	1
21	FW	(United States) Herculez Gomez	26	0	3	0	2	0	0	0	31	0	1569	1842	3	0
22	MF	(United States) Davy Arnaud	25	5	3	0	0	0	0	0	28	5	2214	2412	**8**	0
23	FW	(Sierra Leone) Kei Kamara	4	1	0	0	0	0	0	0	0	0	397	397	1	0
24	DF	(United States) Matt Marquess	1	0	0	0	1	0	0	0	2	0	85	205	1	0
25	DF	(United States) Jonathan Leathers	11	0	2	0	2	0	0	0	15	0	871	1127	4	0
26	MF	(Scotland) Kevin Souter	1	0	0	0	0	0	0	0	1	0	61	61	0	0
27	GK	(United States) Boris Pardo	0	0	0	0	1	0	0	0	1	0	0	120	0	0
28	MF	(United States) Graham Zusi	13	0	0	0	1	0	0	0	14	0	524	601	0	0
30	MF	(United States) Michael Kraus	11	1	2	0	1	1	0	0	14	2	147	263	1	1
33	FW	(United States) Nelson Pizarro*	0	0	0	0	0	0	0	0	0	0	0	0	0	0

=== Goalkeepers ===
No.	Name	MLS				Superliga				USOC				Playoffs				Total			
No.	Name	Apps	GA	GAA	CS	Apps	GA	GAA	CS	Apps	GA	GAA	CS	Apps	GA	GAA	CS	Apps	GA	GAA	SHO
1	(United States) Kevin Hartman	30	42	1.4	7	3	4	1.33	1	1	1	1	0	-	-	-	-	**34**	**47**	**1.38**	**8**
18	(United States) Eric Kronberg	-	-	-	-	-	-	-	-	-	-	-	-	-	-	-	-	**0**	**0**	**0**	**0**
27	(United States) Boris Pardo	-	-	-	-	-	-	-	-	1	3	3	0	-	-	-	-	**1**	**3**	**3**	**0**

Statistics accurate as of match played September 13, 2009
left club during season*
club leader(s) bolded

== Squad ==
As of September 15, 2009.

Note: Flags indicate national team as defined under FIFA eligibility rules; some limited exceptions apply. Players may hold more than one non-FIFA nationality.

No.	Pos.	Nation	Player
1	GK	USA	Kevin Hartman
2	DF	USA	Michael Harrington
3	DF	USA	Chance Myers
5	DF	USA	Matt Besler
6	DF	USA	Lance Watson
7	FW	ARG	Claudio López
9	FW	USA	Adam Cristman
10	MF	ARG	Santiago Hirsig
11	MF	CRC	Kurt Morsink
12	DF	USA	Jimmy Conrad (captain)
13	DF	USA	Rauwshan McKenzie
14	MF	USA	Jack Jewsbury
15	DF	USA	Aaron Hohlbein

No.	Pos.	Nation	Player
16	FW	USA	Josh Wolff
17	MF	HON	Roger Espinoza
18	GK	USA	Eric Kronberg
20	FW	HUN	Zoltán Hercegfalvi
21	FW	USA	Herculez Gomez
22	MF	USA	Davy Arnaud
24	DF	USA	Matt Marquess
25	DF	USA	Jonathan Leathers
26	MF	SCO	Kevin Souter
27	GK	USA	Boris Pardo
28	MF	USA	Graham Zusi
30	FW	USA	Michael Kraus
23	FW	SLE	Kei Kamara

=== Transfers ===
==== In ====
Note: Flags indicate national team as defined under FIFA eligibility rules; some limited exceptions apply. Players may hold more than one non-FIFA nationality.

No.	Pos.	Nation	Player
9	FW	USA	Adam Cristman (from New England Revolution, Trade)
5	DF	USA	Matt Besler (from Draft, 8th Overall)
—	FW	USA	Doug DeMartin (from Draft, 22nd Overall)
28	MF	USA	Graham Zusi (from Draft, 23rd Overall)

No.	Pos.	Nation	Player
—	GK	USA	Neal Kitson (from Draft, 42nd Overall)
—	MF	JAM	Akeem Priestley (from Draft, 50th Overall)
10	MF	ARG	Santiago Hirsig (from San Lorenzo)
20	FW	HUN	Zoltán Hercegfalvi (from Budapest Honvéd FC)

==== Out ====
Note: Flags indicate national team as defined under FIFA eligibility rules; some limited exceptions apply. Players may hold more than one non-FIFA nationality.

No.	Pos.	Nation	Player
5	MF	USA	Kerry Zavagnin (Retired)
10	MF	ARG	Carlos Marinelli (to Club Deportivo Los Millonarios, Released)
23	FW	COL	Iván Trujillo (to Deportes Quindío, Released)
29	FW	USA	Ryan Pore (to Portland Timbers (USL), Released)

No.	Pos.	Nation	Player
20	DF	USA	Tyson Wahl (to Seattle Sounders FC, 2009 Expansion Draft)
33	FW	USA	Nelson Pizarro (Unconfirmed reason)
4	FW	USA	Abe Thompson (to Houston Dynamo)
