= 2007 Kansas City Wizards season =

Kansas City Wizards
2007 season
- Head coach: Curt Onalfo
- Major League Soccer: East: 5th Overall: 8th
- Playoffs: Conference Finals
- Top goalscorer: League: Eddie Johnson (15); All: Eddie Johnson (15)
- Average home league attendance: 11,586
Home colors	Away colors

The 2007 Kansas City Wizards season was the 12th for the club in Major League Soccer. The Wizards finished fifth in the Eastern Conference and eighth overall with 40 points (11W 12L 7D), their best points total since 2004 and, resultantly, as an Eastern Conference team.

Curt Onalfo took over as head coach this season. The club also acquired Kevin Hartman from the LA Galaxy, where the goalkeeper had made a name for himself in the league. For Kansas City, 2007 was mostly defined on-field by Eddie Johnson, who scored 15 league goals including back to back hat tricks to end May and begin June, a feat never before accomplished in the league. Johnson's achievements would be overshadowed by the overall chaos of the 2007 MLS season which included the introduction of the Designated Player Rule, enabling teams to sign far more prolific attackers than previous seasons. Despite Johnson's stellar play and the improvement of the Wizards (who made their first playoff as an Eastern team and lost the re-classified Western Conference Finals to eventual champions Houston Dynamo), more high-profile forwards such as DPs Luciano Emilio and Juan Pablo Ángel were given MLS Best XI consideration over the USMNT player.

This was the last season the Wizards played all their home matches at Arrowhead Stadium, as new ownership began a process of relocation and rebranding that would end up with the club opening its own new stadium in 2011.

== Squad ==
Note: Flags indicate national team as defined under FIFA eligibility rules; some limited exceptions apply. Players may hold more than one non-FIFA nationality.

No.	Pos.	Nation	Player
1	GK	USA	Kevin Hartman
2	DF	USA	Michael Harrington
3	DF	USA	Nick Garcia
4	DF	USA	Amir Lowery
5	MF	USA	Kerry Zavagnin
6	DF	USA	Jose Burciaga Jr.
7	FW	USA	Eddie Johnson
8	MF	USA	Ryan McMahen
9	MF	USA	Sasha Victorine
10	MF	ARG	Carlos Marinelli
11	MF	CRC	Kurt Morsink
12	DF	USA	Jimmy Conrad
13	FW	USA	Will John
14	MF	USA	Jack Jewsbury
15	DF	USA	Aaron Hohlbein

No.	Pos.	Nation	Player
16	FW	ARG	Eloy Colombano
17	FW	ARM	Yura Movsisyan
18	MF	USA	A. J. Godbolt
19	FW	TRI	Scott Sealy
20	DF	USA	Tyson Wahl
21	MF	USA	Lance Watson
22	FW	USA	Davy Arnaud
23	MF	USA	Edson Elcock
24	GK	USA	Eric Kronberg
25	MF	USA	Matt Groenwald
26	MF	USA	Ryan Raybould
27	GK	USA	Chris Konopka
29	FW	USA	Ryan Pore
30	MF	USA	Michael Kraus
33	FW	USA	Willy Guadarrama

== Competitions ==
=== Major League Soccer ===
Overall								Home						Away					
Pld	W	D	L	GF	GA	GD	Pts	W	D	L	GF	GA	GD	W	D	L	GF	GA	GD
30	11	7	12	45	45	0	40	7	3	5	22	18	+4	4	4	7	23	27	−4

Last updated: 2007.
Source: Major League Soccer

Date	Opponents	H / A	Result F – A	Scorers	Attendance
April 14, 2007	D.C. United	A	4–2	Harrington; Victorine; Johnson; Sealy
April 21, 2007	Chicago Fire S.C.	A	1–2	Marinelli
April 25, 2007	Toronto FC	H	3–0	Johnson; Zavagnin; Movsisyan
April 28, 2007	Toronto FC	A	1–0	Johnson
May 5, 2007	Columbus Crew	H	1–0	Burciaga Jr.
May 12, 2007	FC Dallas	H	1–2	Harrington
May 19, 2007	Colorado Rapids	A	1–1	Arnaud
May 26, 2007	New England Revolution	A	4–3	Johnson 3 Arnaud
June 2, 2007	New York Red Bulls	H	3–2	Johnson 3
June 16, 2007	New York Red Bulls	A	3–3	Movsisyan 2 Zavagnin
June 20, 2007	Columbus Crew	A	1–2	Jewsbury
June 24, 2007	Houston Dynamo	H	0–1
July 1, 2007	Toronto FC	H	1–1	Harrington
July 4, 2007	D.C. United	H	0–1
July 7, 2007	Los Angeles Galaxy	A	2–2	Movsisyan; Arnaud
July 14, 2007	Real Salt Lake	H	1–0	Johnson
July 22, 2007	Colorado Rapids	H	2–2	Johnson 2
July 29, 2007	Chivas USA	H	3–2	Zavagnin; Arnaud; Movsisyan
August 2, 2007	New England Revolution	A	0–2
August 19, 2007	New England Revolution	H	0–1
August 22, 2007	Chicago Fire S.C.	H	3–2	Victorine; Sealy; Burciaga Jr.
August 25, 2007	Chicago Fire S.C.	A	0–2
August 29, 2007	Real Salt Lake	A	1–3	Johnson
September 1, 2007	Houston Dynamo	A	1–1	Johnson
September 15, 2007	Columbus Crew	H	3–2	Sealy 2 Johnson
September 22, 2007	Chivas USA	A	1–2	Colombano
September 27, 2007	Los Angeles Galaxy	H	0–1
October 5, 2007	D.C. United	H	1–1	Sealy
October 13, 2007	New York Red Bulls	A	1–2	Jewsbury
October 20, 2007	FC Dallas	A	2–0	Sealy 2

=== U.S. Open Cup qualification ===
Date	Round	Opponents	H / A	Result F – A	Scorers	Attendance
April 18, 2007	Semifinal Qualification	Real Salt Lake	A	1–2 (AET)	Victorine

=== MLS Cup Playoffs ===
Date	Round	Opponents	H / A	Result F – A	Scorers	Attendance
October 27, 2007	Conference Semi-finals	Chivas USA	H	1–0	Arnaud
November 3, 2007	Conference Semi-finals	Chivas USA	A	0–0
November 10, 2007	Conference Finals	Houston Dynamo	A	0–2

== Squad statistics ==
No.	Pos.	Name	MLS		Playoffs		USOC		Total		Minutes		Discipline	
No.	Pos.	Name	Apps	Goals	Apps	Goals	Apps	Goals	Apps	Goals	League	Total	Yellow card	Red card
1	GK	(United States) Kevin Hartman	30	0	3	0	1	0	34	0	2700	3090	0	0
5	MF	(United States) Kerry Zavagnin	29	3	3	0	1	0	33	3	2564	2850	0	0
2	DF	(United States) Michael Harrington	29	3	3	0	1	0	33	3	2422	2812	0	0
9	MF	(United States) Sasha Victorine	29	2	3	0	1	1	33	3	2135	2402	0	0
22	FW	(United States) Davy Arnaud	28	4	3	1	1	0	32	5	2489	2807	0	0
14	MF	(United States) Jack Jewsbury	28	2	3	0	1	0	32	2	2316	2642	0	0
3	DF	(United States) Nick Garcia	27	0	3	0	1	0	31	0	2420	2810	0	0
12	DF	(United States) Jimmy Conrad	25	0	3	0	1	0	29	0	2172	2562	0	0
7	FW	(United States) Eddie Johnson	24	15	3	0	1	0	28	15	2149	2464	0	0
10	MF	(Argentina) Carlos Marinelli	26	1	1	0	1	0	28	1	1674	1777	0	0
11	MF	(Costa Rica) Kurt Morsink	21	0	3	0	1	0	25	0	895	1267	0	0
6	DF	(United States) Jose Burciaga Jr.	23	2	1	0	0	0	24	2	1826	1824	0	0
19	FW	(Trinidad and Tobago) Scott Sealy	18	7	3	0	1	0	22	7	1194	1487	0	0
29	FW	(United States) Ryan Pore	17	0	3	0	0	0	20	0	456	512	0	0
17	FW	(Armenia) Yura Movsisyan	18	5	0	0	1	0	19	5	666	786	0	0
26	MF	(United States) Ryan Raybould	10	0	1	0	1	0	12	0	424	545	0	0
16	FW	(Argentina) Eloy Colombano	10	1	1	0	0	0	11	1	310	334	0	0
20	DF	(United States) Tyson Wahl	6	0	0	0	0	0	6	0	415	415	0	0
15	DF	(United States) Aaron Hohlbein	5	0	0	0	0	0	5	0	360	360	0	0
13	FW	(United States) Will John	3	0	0	0	1	0	4	0	26	146	0	0
21	MF	(United States) Lance Watson	2	0	1	0	0	0	3	0	23	24	0	0

Final Statistics
