= Carlos Johnson (footballer) =

Costa Rican footballer (born 1984)

Personal information
- Full name: Carlos Johnson Carpio
- Date of birth: July 10, 1984 (age 42)
- Place of birth: Cartago, Costa Rica
- Height: 6 ft 1 in (1.85 m)
- Position: Right-back

Youth career
- –2001: Cartaginés

Senior career*
Years	Team	Apps	(Gls)
2001–2004	Cartaginés	58	(2)
2004–2008	Herediano	91	(4)
2008	Bryne	17	(1)
2009	New York Red Bulls	13	(0)
2010	Once Caldas	6	(0)
2011–2012	Cartaginés	40	(4)
2013–2016	Cartaginés	117	(11)

International career
2001	Costa Rica U-17	4	(0)
2006–2013	Costa Rica	14	(0)
- * Club domestic league appearances and goals

Carlos Johnson Carpio (born July 10, 1984) is a Costa Rican former footballer.

== Club career ==
=== Early years ===
Johnson began his career in the Cartaginés youth system. He joined Herediano in 2004 and became one of the top right backs in Costa Rica. In his four years at the club Johnson appeared in 91 Primera División de Costa Rica games and notched 4 goals. In 2008 Johnson signed with Norwegian club Bryne FK, and subsequently appeared in 17 matches for the club scoring one goal, but due to the club's economic problems, he was released from his contract in early 2009.

=== New York Red Bulls ===
On March 19, 2009, Johnson signed with the New York Red Bulls, who had been seeking him since the summer transfer window. He made his New York debut on April 5 as a substitute for Jeremy Hall in the 62nd minute of a 1–0 loss to the Chicago Fire at Toyota Park. In his first Red Bulls start six days later he was shown the red card in the 78th after taking down Geoff Cameron with a hard sliding tackle in a scoreless draw with the Houston Dynamo at Robertson Stadium. After serving a one-match suspension, he was immediately expelled for doing the same to deny Herculez Gomez a goal-scoring opportunity in New York's penalty area two minutes into the next game against the Kansas City Wizards at CommunityAmerica Ballpark on April 23. This established a new Major League Soccer (MLS) record for fastest ejection from a contest, displacing Aidan Heaney who had held the previous mark for almost thirteen years. Claudio López's successful penalty kick as a result of the infraction was the only goal in the Red Bulls' 1–0 defeat. Johnson picked up his third red card of the campaign as a result of an altercation with Michael Harrington right after the final whistle following another 1–0 loss to the Wizards at Giants Stadium on September 12. His three transgressions equaled the league and franchise records for most red cards in one season, which had been established by Branco in 1997. Johnson was waived by New York on February 12, 2010.

On February 22, 2010, he signed with Colombian club Once Caldas at the request of his former coach with New York Juan Carlos Osorio.

=== Return to Cartaginés ===
In January 2011, Johnson returned to hometown club Cartaginés. In May 2014 Cartaginés announced Johnson to continue with the club after dismissing him only 2 months earlier due poor performances.

== International career ==
Johnson has represented Costa Rica at various levels. He was a member of Costa Rica's U-17 World Cup team in 2001, appearing in all 4 matches.

He made his senior debut for Costa Rica in a March 2006 friendly match against Iran and has, as of May 2014, earned a total of 14 caps, scoring no goals. He represented his country in 2 FIFA World Cup qualification matches and was part of the preliminary squad for the 2006 World Cup but was not selected to travel to Germany. He also played at the 2009 UNCAF Nations Cup as well as at the 2013 CONCACAF Gold Cup.

== Statistics ==
League	Appearances	Goals
Primera División de Costa Rica	91	4
Adeccoligaen (Norway)	17	1
Major League Soccer	13	0
