= Roger Espinoza =

Honduran football player (born 1986)

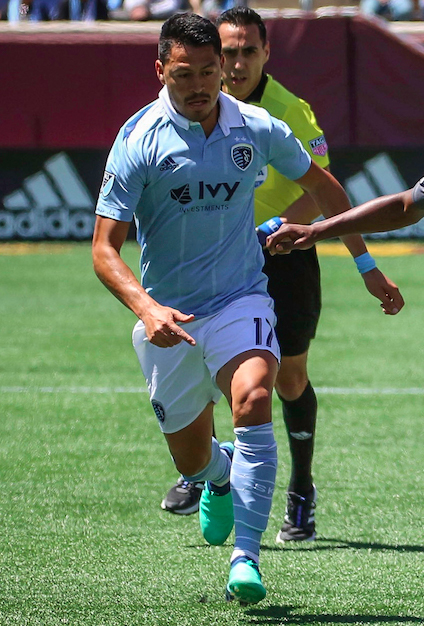
- Espinoza with Sporting Kansas City in 2018

Personal information
- Full name: Roger Aníbal Espinoza Ramírez
- Date of birth: 25 October 1986 (age 40)
- Place of birth: Puerto Cortés, Honduras
- Height: 5 ft 11 in (1.80 m)
- Positions: Midfielder; defender

College career
Years	Team	Apps	(Gls)
2005–2006	Yavapai Roughriders		
2007	Ohio State Buckeyes		

Senior career*
Years	Team	Apps	(Gls)
2006	Arizona Sahuaros	7	(1)
2008–2012	Sporting Kansas City (Note: The club was known as the Kansas City Wizards prior to rebranding as Sporting Kansas City in 2011)	113	(2)
2013–2015	Wigan Athletic	42	(2)
2015–2023	Sporting Kansas City	210	(10)
2019	→ Swope Park Rangers (loan)	1	(0)
2024	Des Moines Menace	0	(0)
Total		373	(15)

International career
2012	Honduras Olympic	4	(1)
2009–2017	Honduras	52	(4)

Managerial career
- 2021–2024: Sporting Kansas City (youth)
- 2025–: Sporting Kansas City (assistant)
Medal record
Honduras
Third place	UNCAF Nations Cup	2009
- * Club domestic league appearances and goals as of 17:17, 26 April 2023 (UTC)

Roger Aníbal Espinoza Ramírez (Spanish pronunciation: [ˈroʝeɾ espiˈnosa]; born 25 October 1986) is a Honduran former professional footballer who played as a midfielder or defender. Espinoza currently serves as a youth coach for Major League Soccer club Sporting Kansas City. A former Honduras international, Espinoza represented his country at two World Cups and the 2012 Summer Olympics.

== Club career ==
=== Youth and college ===
Espinoza was born in Puerto Cortés, Honduras. At the age of twelve, Espinoza and his family emigrated to the United States where he was raised in Denver, Colorado. He attended Denver South High School before transferring to Regis Jesuit High School in Aurora, Colorado.

He played two years of college soccer at Yavapai College, spending one season with the Arizona Sahuaros of the National Premier Soccer League in 2006. In 2007, he transferred to Ohio State for his junior season. That season, Ohio State advanced to the national championship game of the College Cup. Espinoza scored in the 12th minute, but Ohio State lost to Wake Forest, 2–1. In his one season at Ohio State, Espinoza was named first-team All-Big Ten, second-team all-region, and earned a spot the NCAA College Cup All-Tournament Team.

=== Sporting Kansas City ===
Espinoza opted to forgo his senior year of college and signed a Generation Adidas contract with Major League Soccer. He was selected with the 11th overall pick of the 2008 MLS SuperDraft by the Kansas City Wizards (now known as Sporting Kansas City). In his first season at the club, he appeared in 22 games and tied for third on the team in assists with 3. Playing as both a leftback and defensive midfielder, he appeared in 113 regular season matches over five years with the club and helped Sporting to victory in the 2012 Lamar Hunt US Open Cup.

=== Wigan Athletic ===
Following the 2012 MLS season, Espinoza signed with Wigan Athletic of the English Premier League on a free transfer. He was assigned number 18.

Espinoza made his Wigan Athletic debut on 19 January when he came on as a half-time substitute during a 2–3 loss against Sunderland. He scored his first goal for the club against Swansea City on 7 May. On 11 May 2013, Espinoza won the FA Cup with Wigan, playing the whole game in a 1–0 upset win against Manchester City. However, only three days later, Wigan were relegated from the Premier League following a 4–1 defeat against Arsenal. He scored his second goal for the club against MK Dons in the FA Cup on 4 January 2014. Espinoza scored his second league goal and provided an assist for teammate Shaun Maloney against Fulham on 1 November 2014 at the DW Stadium in a 3–3 draw.

However, Espinoza's minutes dwindled in the 2014–15 season, and he and Wigan agreed to part ways in December 2014.

=== Return to Kansas City ===
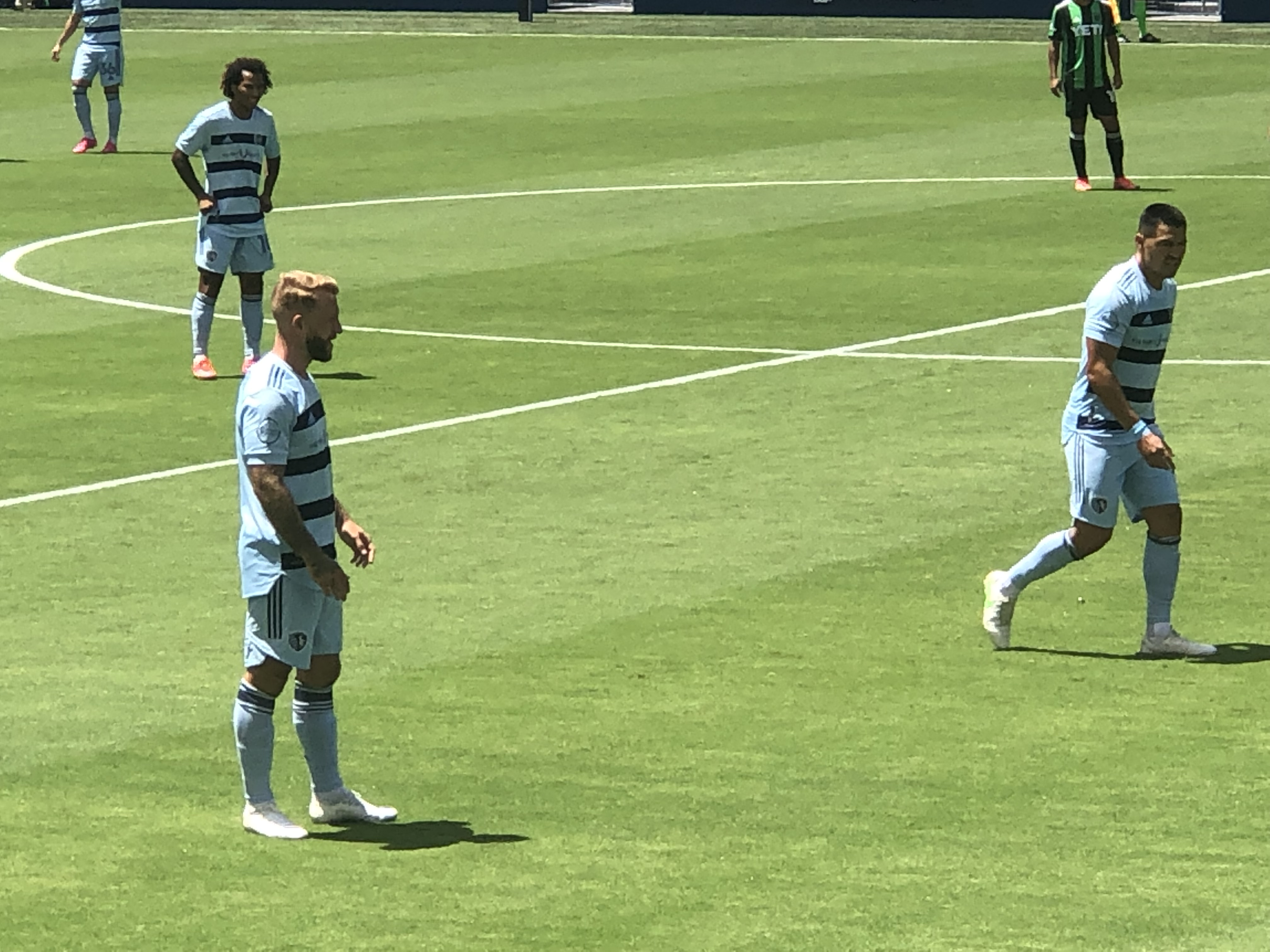
Espinoza (right) with Sporting Kansas City in 2021

Espinoza returned to Sporting Kansas City ahead of the 2015 season. In his second start since returning to Sporting, Espinoza scored an equalising goal against FC Dallas on 14 March 2015. Espinoza saw his first season back in Kansas City curtailed through injury though the side still won the 2015 Lamar Hunt US Open Cup. Espinoza played a key role as Sporting KC repeated the feat two years later, lifting the 2017 Lamar Hunt US Open Cup by beating the New York Red Bulls 2–1 at Children's Mercy Park. In the 2018 MLS season, Espinoza has set a new career-high with nine assists in a single season, having never produced more than five in the past.

In August 2021, Espinoza took an assistant coaching role with the Sporting KC Academy as part of his B License course in the US Soccer Coaching Education program. Espinoza would serve as an U-13 assistant.

On 13 January 2022, it was announced that SKC had re-signed Espinoza to a one-year contract for the 2022 Major League Soccer season, and spent a final season with the club for 2023. He briefly signed with Des Moines Menace for their 2024 US Open Cup campaign, but announced his retirement in June 2024 after the Menace were eliminated from the competition.

== International career ==
Espinoza was called up to the Honduras national football team by Reinaldo Rueda for the UNCAF Nations Cup 2009 held in Honduras for the first time in his career. He made three appearances during the tournament where he wore number 13. He scored his first goal for the national team in a 1–0 win against El Salvador to give Honduras 3rd place in the competition.

Espinoza was called up by Luis Fernando Suárez to represent his country in the 2012 London Olympics; he scored a goal against Brazil in the quarter-final of the tournament, but was sent off in the 90th minute, receiving standing ovation from the Newcastle crowd for his performance.

Espinoza has represented Honduras at the 2010 and 2014 FIFA World Cups.

On 16 August 2019, Espinoza announced his retirement from the Honduras national team.

== Personal life ==
Espinoza became a United States citizen in March 2008. He is married to Kansas City Current player Lo'eau LaBonta.

== Career statistics ==
=== Club ===
As of 9 October 2022

Club	Season	League			National cup (Note: Includes U.S. Open Cup and FA Cup)		League cup (Note: Includes MLS Cup Playoffs, EFL Cup and MLS is Back Tournament)		Continental		Other		Total	
Club	Season	Division	Apps	Goals	Apps	Goals	Apps	Goals	Apps	Goals	Apps	Goals	Apps	Goals
Sporting Kansas City	2008	Major League Soccer	22	1	2	0	2	0	—		0	0	26	1
Sporting Kansas City	2009	Major League Soccer	16	0	1	0	—		2 (Note: Appearances in North American SuperLiga)	0	0	0	19	0
Sporting Kansas City	2010	Major League Soccer	25	0	0	0	—		—		0	0	25	0
Sporting Kansas City	2011	Major League Soccer	24	1	1	0	3	0	—		0	0	28	1
Sporting Kansas City	2012	Major League Soccer	26	0	3	0	2	0	—		0	0	31	0
Sporting Kansas City	Total		113	2	7	0	7	0	2	0	0	0	129	2
Wigan Athletic	2012–13	Premier League	12	1	4	0	0	0	—		0	0	16	1
Wigan Athletic	2013–14	Championship	18	0	5	1	1	0	3 (Note: Appearances in UEFA Europa League)	0	2 (Note: One appearance in both FA Community Shield, Championship play-offs)	0	29	1
Wigan Athletic	2014–15	Championship	12	1	0	0	1	0	—		0	0	13	1
Wigan Athletic	Total		42	2	9	1	2	0	3	0	2	0	58	3
Sporting Kansas City	2015	Major League Soccer	17	1	3	0	0	0	—		0	0	20	1
Sporting Kansas City	2016	Major League Soccer	30	1	2	0	1	0	1 (Note: Appearance(s) in CONCACAF Champions League)	0	0	0	34	1
Sporting Kansas City	2017	Major League Soccer	30	1	5	0	1	0	—		0	0	36	1
Sporting Kansas City	2018	Major League Soccer	32	3	3	0	4	0	—		0	0	39	3
Sporting Kansas City	2019	Major League Soccer	16	0	0	0	—		6	1	0	0	22	1
Sporting Kansas City	2020	Major League Soccer	16	2	—		4 (Note: Two appearances in MLS is Back Tournament knockout stage, two appearances and one goal in MLS Cup Playoffs)	1	—		0	0	20	3
Sporting Kansas City	2021	Major League Soccer	32	0	—		2	0	0	0	0	0	34	0
Sporting Kansas City	2022	Major League Soccer	30	2	3	0	—		—		0	0	33	2
Sporting Kansas City	Total		203	10	16	0	12	1	7	1	0	0	238	12
Swope Park Rangers (loan)	2019	USL Championship	1	0	—		—		—		—		1	0
Career Total			359	14	32	1	21	1	12	1	2	0	426	17

=== International ===
As of 31 August 2018

National team	Year	Apps	Goals
Honduras	2009	8	2
Honduras	2010	8	1
Honduras	2011	7	0
Honduras	2012	3	0
Honduras	2013	13	0
Honduras	2014	6	1
Honduras	2015	1	0
Honduras	2016	4	0
Honduras	2017	2	0
Total		52	4

=== International goals ===
Scores and results list Honduras's goal tally first.

N.	Date	Venue	Opponent	Score	Result	Competition
1.	1 February 2009	Estadio Tiburcio Carías Andino, Tegucigalpa, Honduras	El Salvador	1–0	1–0	2009 UNCAF Nations Cup
2.	11 July 2009	Gillette Stadium, Foxborough, United States	Grenada	2–0	4–0	2009 CONCACAF Gold Cup
3.	23 January 2010	StubHub Center, Carson, United States	United States	3–0	3–1	Friendly
4.	1 June 2014	BBVA Compass Stadium, Houston, United States	Israel	1–1	2–4	Friendly

== Honours ==
Sporting Kansas City

- Lamar Hunt US Open Cup: 2012, 2015, 2017

Wigan Athletic

- FA Cup: 2012–13
