= Kevin Souter =

Scottish footballer

Personal information
- Date of birth: 7 January 1984 (age 42)
- Place of birth: Portsoy, Scotland
- Position: Midfielder

College career
Years	Team	Apps	(Gls)
2007	Graceland		

Senior career*
Years	Team	Apps	(Gls)
2002–2004	Aberdeen	4	(0)
2004–2006	Buckie Thistle		
2007	Des Moines Menace	12	(2)
2008–2009	Kansas City Wizards	8	(1)
2011	Serbian White Eagles	4	(0)

International career
2005	Scotland Semi-Pro	3	(1)

Managerial career
- 2010–2015: Ryerson
- * Club domestic league appearances and goals

Kevin Souter (born 7 January 1984) is a Scottish former professional footballer.

== Club career ==
=== Early career in Scotland ===
Kevin graduated from the Grant Smith Soccer Academy in Portsoy before heading to play for the Westhill boy's club, and was a member of Scottish Premier Division team Aberdeen's youth setup, making four first team league appearances for them between 2002 and 2003. He joined Scottish non-league side Buckie Thistle in 2004, and played for them in the Highland Football League for one year prior to his move across the Atlantic.

=== College and amateur ===
Souter moved to the United States in 2005 to play college soccer for Graceland University, where he was named 2nd Team NAIA All-American in 2007 and was an Honorable-Mention All-American choice when his team won the 2006 NAIA National Championship. During his college years he also played with Des Moines Menace in the USL Premier Development League

=== Professional ===
Souter was signed as a developmental player by Kansas City Wizards in May 2008 after impressing head coach Curt Onalfo during a two-day open tryout. He made his debut for them on 13 September 2008, coming on as a second-half substitute for Herculez Gomez against Los Angeles Galaxy. He scored his first Major League Soccer goal against Toronto FC in the 79 minute. Josh Wolff gave him the goal through an assist.

Souter was waived by Kansas City during the 2010 pre-season, and initially was selected by Seattle Sounders FC off the waivers list, but was not offered a contract by the MLS club because their front office was targeting other international players. In 2011, he played in the southern Ontario-based Canadian Soccer League with the Serbian White Eagles.

== Coaching career ==
Having failed to secure a professional contract elsewhere, Souter moved to Canada to be a player-coach for the Ryerson University men's soccer team in Toronto, Ontario, under head coach Ivan Joseph (his former coach at Graceland University). Having taken some classes at the university to allow him to play in 2010, Souter became the head coach of the women's team for the 2011 season, with Joseph staying on as an assistant until 2012.

In March 2015, Souter stepped down as head coach citing fatigue and a desire to move closer to family in Scotland.
