= Ryan McMahen =

American soccer player (born 1982)

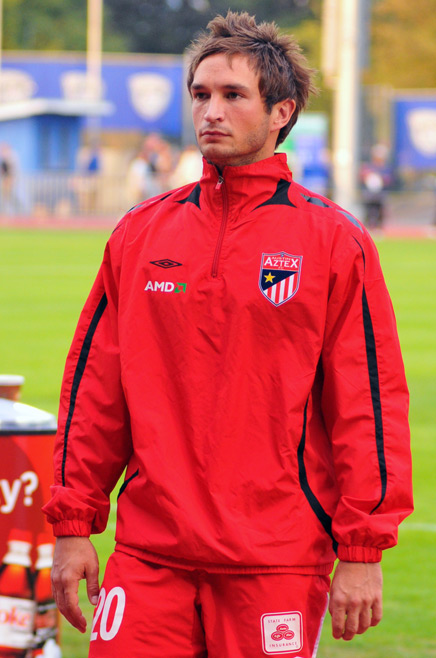

Personal information
- Date of birth: December 22, 1982 (age 43)
- Place of birth: Munster, Indiana, United States
- Height: 6 ft 0 in (1.83 m)
- Position: Midfielder

Youth career
- 2001–2005: Michigan State Spartans

Senior career*
Years	Team	Apps	(Gls)
2004–2005	Michigan Bucks	22	(9)
2006–2008	Kansas City Wizards	0	(0)
2009	Austin Aztex	30	(1)
- * Club domestic league appearances and goals as of 6 November 2009

Ryan McMahen (born December 22, 1982) is an American former professional soccer player.

== Career ==
=== Collegiate and amateur ===
McMahen played college soccer at Michigan State University from 2001 to 2005. He finished his career with 26 goals and 28 assists, coming out of the midfield; the latter was good enough for second all-time in school history. While at Michigan State, McMahen garnered many accolades including All Big Ten three times, and All America as a senior. During his college years he also played with the Michigan Bucks in the Premier Development League, where he was an All League Performer.

=== Professional ===
McMahen was drafted in the second round, 16th overall, by the Kansas City Wizards in 2006 MLS Supplemental Draft, but saw no playing time with the first team during the 2006 season.

He made his professional debut on July 12, 2006, in the Lamar Hunt U.S. Open Cup match against Des Moines Menace, playing the full game. He also made an appearance on July 1, 2008, in the same competition, starting the match against the Carolina Railhawks.

McMahen was waived by the Wizards on September 5, 2008, never having registered a single minute in a Major League Soccer game. He joined Austin Aztex of the USL First Division for the 2009 season, but was released by the Aztex at the end of the year.
