= Ryan Raybould =

American former footballer and lawyer (born 1983)

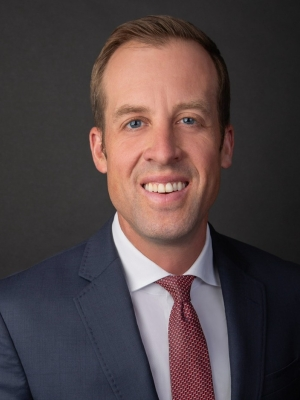

United States Attorney for the Northern District of Texas
- Incumbent
- Assumed office November 17, 2025
- President: Donald Trump
- Preceded by: Leigha Simonton

Personal details
- Born: Ryan Russell Raybould; May 30, 1983 (age 43) Leawood, Kansas, U.S.
Association football career
- Positions: Midfielder; defender
College career
Years	Team	Apps	(Gls)
2001–2004	Yale Bulldogs		
Senior career*
Years	Team	Apps	(Gls)
2002–2004	Kansas City Brass	37	(6)
2005–2007	Kansas City Wizards	19	(0)
2008	Sandvikens IF		
2008–2009	Gefle IF	4	(0)
- * Club domestic league appearances and goals as of May 24, 2007 ‡ National team caps and goals as of May 24, 2007

Ryan Russell Raybould (born May 30, 1983, in Leawood, Kansas) is an American lawyer and former professional soccer player who has served as the United States Attorney for the United States Attorney's Office for the Northern District of Texas since May 2026. He played midfielder for the Gefle IF of Allsvenskan in Sweden. As an attorney, he was U.S. Senator John Cornyn's chief counsel and a litigation partner at Kirkland & Ellis. In October 2025, Raybould was nominated by President Donald Trump to be the United States Attorney for the United States District Court for the Northern District of Texas. He was confirmed by the U.S. Senate in May 2026.

== Soccer career ==
Raybould signed a developmental contract with the Wizards on March 11, 2005. He appeared in 19 games. After four seasons in MLS, Raybould signed a contract with Swedish club Gefle IF during the summer 2008. His stint in Gefle was a short one, Raybould only played four games in the Swedish top-tier league, and he resigned a year later.

== Legal career ==
After retiring from professional soccer Raybould studied law at Notre Dame Law School. After graduating, he clerked for Judge Reed O'Connor of the United States District Court for the Northern District of Texas. He has worked as a federal prosecutor in the U.S. Justice Department. As of August 27, 2018, Raybould was an assistant United States attorney at the Dallas Criminal Division. Raybould worked as Senator John Cornyn's chief counsel and was also the deputy chief of the white collar and public corruption unit in the United States Attorney’s Office for the Northern District of Texas.

== United States Attorney for the Northern District of Texas ==
Raybould was named the United States Attorney for the Northern District of Texas on November 17, 2025, by U.S. Attorney General Pam Bondi. The Northern District of Texas covers 96,000 square miles and a population of approximately eight million, including those in Dallas, Fort Worth, Amarillo, Lubbock, Abilene, San Angelo, Wichita Falls, and surrounding areas. Raybould oversees roughly 220 attorneys and staff across five division offices and is responsible for all federal criminal prosecutions and civil litigation involving the United States government in the region. Raybould was confirmed by the U.S. Senate on May 18, 2026.

== Personal life ==
Raybould's wife, Brooke, is a social media influencer.
