= Santiago Hirsig =

Argentine footballer

Personal information
- Full name: Santiago Hirsig
- Date of birth: January 12, 1978 (age 48)
- Place of birth: San Isidro, Argentina
- Height: 1.84 m (6 ft 0 in)
- Positions: Winger; centre midfielder

Senior career*
Years	Team	Apps	(Gls)
1998–1999	Atlanta	18	(0)
1999–2001	Platense	46	(2)
2001–2003	Huracán	28	(1)
2003–2006	Arsenal de Sarandí	107	(9)
2006–2009	San Lorenzo	77	(6)
2009–2010	Kansas City Wizards	27	(1)
2010–2012	Quilmes	11	(1)
- * Club domestic league appearances and goals as of 21:02, 19 December 2010 (UTC)

Santiago Hirsig (born January 12, 1978, in San Isidro) is an Argentine retired professional footballer, who predominantly played as a midfielder.

== Career ==
=== Argentina ===
Hirsig started his career playing in the Argentine 2nd Division with Atlanta, and later Club Atlético Platense, before moving to Huracán in 2001.

At the end of the 2003 Clausura, Huracán were relegated after ending up last in the final standings, and Hirsig was sold to Arsenal de Sarandí. In 2004, Hirsig helped Arsenal to qualify for their first ever international tournament, the Copa Sudamericana. In 2006, Hirsig was signed by San Lorenzo.

=== United States ===
On February 11, 2009, the Kansas City Wizards of Major League Soccer announced they had signed Hirsig. After a few years in MLS, Hirsig moved back to Argentina with Quilmes.

=== Argentina ===
Hirsig played for Quilmes until he was released in June 2012.

== Titles ==
Season	Club	Title
Clausura 2007	San Lorenzo	Primera Division Argentina
