= Matt Groenwald =

American soccer player

Personal information
- Full name: Matt Groenwald
- Date of birth: April 30, 1983 (age 43)
- Place of birth: Park Ridge, Illinois, United States
- Height: 5 ft 8 in (1.73 m)
- Position: Midfielder

College career
Years	Team	Apps	(Gls)
2001–2005	St. John's Red Storm		

Senior career*
Years	Team	Apps	(Gls)
2001–2002	Chicago Fire Premier	6	(0)
2006–2007	Kansas City Wizards	19	(0)
- * Club domestic league appearances and goals

Matt Groenwald (born April 30, 1983, in Park Ridge, Illinois) is an American soccer player who last played right back for the Kansas City Wizards of Major League Soccer.

Groenwald played college soccer at St. John's University from 2001 to 2005, where he finished his career with 15 goals and 22 assists. He also played in the USL Premier Development League for Chicago Fire Premier.

He was drafted in the third round 38th overall, by the Kansas City Wizards in 2006 MLS SuperDraft. He retired due to a medical condition discovered early in the 2007 MLS campaign. Father to Bo.
