= Iván Trujillo =

Colombian footballer (born 1982)

Ivan Trujillo
Personal information
- Full name: Ivan Rodrigo Trujillo Vanegas
- Date of birth: June 28, 1982 (age 44)
- Place of birth: Santander de Quilichao, Colombia
- Height: 6 ft 0 in (1.83 m)
- Position: Forward

Team information
- Current team: ACD Lara

Youth career
- Deportivo Cali

Senior career*
Years	Team	Apps	(Gls)
2004	Deportivo Cali	1	(0)
2004–2005	→ Atlético Huila (loan)	33	(9)
2005–2006	Deportivo Cali	24	(5)
2007	Once Caldas	13	(4)
2007	La Equidad	18	(7)
2008	Kansas City Wizards	17	(1)
2009–2010	Deportes Quindío	4	(0)
2011	Deportivo Zacapa	14	(7)
2012	América de Cali	34	(9)
2013	Llaneros	12	(2)
2014–	ACD Lara	7	(5)
- * Club domestic league appearances and goals as of April 15, 2013

Iván Rodrigo Trujillo Vanegas (born June 28, 1982) is a Colombian football forward who currently plays for ACD Lara.

== Club career ==
=== Colombia ===
Trujillo made his debut in the Colombian First Division in 2004 with Deportivo Cali. He was loaned out to CD Atlético Huila, where he began to establish himself in the Colombian First Division. While at Huila he scored 9 goals in 33 appearances. He then returned to Cali and became a regular at the club during the 2006 campaign. His most productive season was in 2007 where he scored 11 goals in 31 First division matches.

=== Major League Soccer ===
Trujillo scored in his debut for the Kansas City Wizards against D.C. United on March 29, 2008. However, Trujillo struggled during the rest of the 2008 season and struggled to make the starting eleven.
