= Nelson Pizarro =

American soccer player (born 1985)

Personal information
- Full name: Nelson Pizarro
- Date of birth: July 8, 1985 (age 41)
- Place of birth: Pembroke Pines, Florida, United States
- Height: 5 ft 9 in (1.75 m)
- Position: Midfielder

College career
Years	Team	Apps	(Gls)
2004–2007	Lincoln Memorial Railsplitters		

Senior career*
Years	Team	Apps	(Gls)
2007	Ventura County Fusion	13	(2)
2008–2011	Kansas City Wizards	16	(0)
2011	Miami FC	8	(0)
2011	San Diego Flash		
2013	Los Angeles Blues	26	(5)
2016	North County Battalion	9	(6)
2017	Southern California Seahorses	5	(5)
- * Club domestic league appearances and goals as of 14 June 2017

Nelson Pizarro (born July 8, 1985) is an American soccer player who is currently a coach for San Diego Surf SC.

== Career ==
=== College and amateur ===
Pizarro played college soccer for Lincoln Memorial University. Growing up Nelson never played 11 aside soccer instead learning the game at his family's indoor and 5 aside facility in Miami Florida. He played with adults at a very young age and became a technically gifted player.

He regularly scored goals in big matches and could be utilized by the coaching staff in many positions including central defence and as a wide midfielder or full back. However, his most effective position is an attacking midfielder due to his technical ability, scoring from outside the box and effective runs into the box.

As a sophomore at Lincoln he won several awards including a Gulf South Conference Championship. In his upperclassman career he won awards including All-American honors as he captained the team to the South Atlantic Conference championship, two regional championships, a final four berth in 2006 and in his last game at the university the National Championship final against Franklin Pierce University in 2007.

During his college years, Pizarro also played in the USL Premier Development League for Ventura County Fusion,

Pizarro made history as the first soccer player at Lincoln Memorial University to be inducted into the LMU Athletics Hall of Fame in 2014 for the Class of 2007. A decorated All-American during his collegiate career, Pizarro was a leader in the program’s rise to national prominence — helping the team capture multiple conference championships, reach the NCAA Division II Final Four twice, and compete in the national championship final.

=== Professional ===
Pizarro was signed to a developmental contract by Kansas City Wizards on April 30, 2008, after impressing head coach Curt Onalfo and GM Peter Vermes during a two-day open tryout . He made his full professional debut for the Wizards on 8 July 2008, in a US Open Cup quarterfinal game against the Seattle Sounders.

After his collegiate career, Pizarro played professionally for clubs in Serbia and Montenegro, the San Diego Flash, and the LA Blues of the USL First Division, joining the latter at the invitation of then–General Manager Warren Barton.

=== Post-Retirement ===
After hanging up his professional cleats, Pizarro followed his lifelong passion for entrepreneurship.

He now coaches at San Diego Surf, an American youth soccer club.

Off the field, Nelson and his in-laws built the Castelli & Pizarro Family Winery (est. 2009), featuring a cozy tasting room in San Diego and a scenic vineyard in Ramona.

In 2022, Nelson founded Banking For Legacy — a financial education company where he teaches families and business owners how to self-finance, grow wealth, and take control of their money through the Infinite Banking Concept.
