= Matt Marquess =

American soccer player (born 1986)

Personal information
- Full name: Matthew Newton Marquess
- Date of birth: January 29, 1986 (age 40)
- Place of birth: Nashville, Tennessee, United States
- Height: 6 ft 0 in (1.83 m)
- Position: Defender

Youth career
- 2004: Santa Cruz Banana Slugs
- 2005–2007: Santa Clara Broncos

Senior career*
| Years | Team | Apps | (Gls) |
| 2007 | San Jose Frogs | 4 | (0) |
| 2008–2009 | Kansas City Wizards | 6 | (0) |
- * Club domestic league appearances and goals as of 26 October 2009

Matt Marquess (born January 29, 1986) is an American retired soccer player.

== Career ==
=== College and amateur ===
Marquess grew up in Palo Alto, California, played college soccer for UC Santa Cruz and Santa Clara University, and in the USL Premier Development League for San Jose Frogs.

=== Professional ===
Marquess was drafted in the third round (39th overall) of the 2008 MLS SuperDraft by Kansas City Wizards. He made his full professional debut for the Wizards on 1 July 2008, in a US Open Cup third-round game against the Carolina RailHawks.

Marquess quietly retired from professional soccer in January 2010 after making just six professional appearances for Kansas City Wizards.
