= Rauwshan McKenzie =

American soccer player (born 1986)

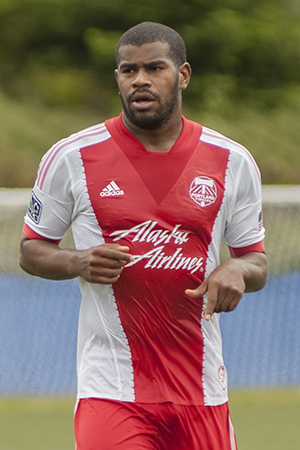

Personal information
- Full name: Rauwshan Isaam McKenzie
- Date of birth: November 19, 1986 (age 39)
- Place of birth: Stamford, Connecticut, United States
- Height: 6 ft 2 in (1.88 m)
- Position: Defender

Youth career
- 2004–2007: Michigan State Spartans

Senior career*
Years	Team	Apps	(Gls)
2005–2006	Michigan Bucks	21	(1)
2007	Chicago Fire Premier	12	(0)
2008–2009	Kansas City Wizards	5	(0)
2010–2011	Real Salt Lake	6	(0)
2012	Chivas USA	20	(0)
2013–2014	Portland Timbers	8	(0)
2014	→ Orange County Blues (loan)	3	(0)
2015	Atlanta Silverbacks	29	(1)
2016	Rayo OKC	14	(0)
- * Club domestic league appearances and goals as of August 30, 2017

Rauwshan Isaam McKenzie (born November 19, 1986, in Stamford, Connecticut) is an American former professional soccer player.

== Career ==
=== College and amateur ===
McKenzie played college soccer for Michigan State University from 2004 to 2007. In 2004, he was named to the Freshman All-Big-10 team, and as a senior in 2007 he was selected 1st Team All-Big-10. During his college years, McKenzie also played for the Michigan Bucks and the Chicago Fire Premier in the Premier Development League.

=== Professional ===
McKenzie was drafted in the fourth round (53rd overall) of the 2008 MLS SuperDraft by Kansas City Wizards. He made his full professional debut for the Wizards on July 8, 2008, in the U.S. Open Cup quarter final against Seattle Sounders.

McKenzie was released by the Wizards on February 8, 2010. He was claimed on waivers by Real Salt Lake days later. McKenzie remained with RSL through the 2011 season. At season's end, the club declined his 2012 contract option and he entered the 2011 MLS Re-Entry Draft. McKenzie was not selected in the draft and became a free agent.

He signed with Chivas USA on February 22, 2012. Chivas USA released McKenzie exactly one year later on February 22, 2013.

On May 22, 2013, McKenzie signed with Portland Timbers. He scored his first Timbers goal in the 72nd minute of a CONCACAF Champions League match against CD Olimpia on September 16, 2014, which the Timbers would win 4–2.

McKenzie signed with NASL club Atlanta Silverbacks on March 18, 2015.

On January 15, 2016, McKenzie was announced as one of the first three players signed by North American Soccer League expansion side Rayo OKC.
