= Jonathan Leathers =

American soccer player (born 1985)

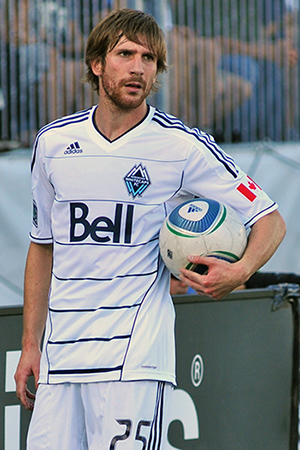

Personal information
- Full name: Jonathan Leathers
- Date of birth: November 5, 1985 (age 40)
- Place of birth: Athens, Georgia, U.S.
- Height: 5 ft 9 in (1.75 m)
- Position: Defender

College career
Years	Team	Apps	(Gls)
2004–2007	Furman Paladins		

Senior career*
Years	Team	Apps	(Gls)
2005–2006	Augusta FireBall	26	(0)
2007	Atlanta Silverbacks U23's	13	(0)
2008–2010	Kansas City Wizards	34	(0)
2011	Vancouver Whitecaps FC	22	(0)
2014	Charlotte Eagles	16	(1)

International career^{‡}
2008	United States U23	2	(0)
- * Club domestic league appearances and goals as of September 12, 2014 ‡ National team caps and goals as of November 18, 2010

Jonathan Leathers (born November 5, 1985) is an American retired soccer player.

== Career ==
=== Highschool ===
Leathers played recreation department league soccer while attending Prince Avenue Christian.

=== College and amateur ===
Leathers played college soccer at Furman University from 2004 to 2007, and was a three-time All-Conference first team player and a one-time second team All-American during his collegiate career. He was named Furman Male Athlete of the Year as a senior. During his college years, he also played with Augusta FireBall and Atlanta Silverbacks U23's in the Premier Development League.

=== Professional ===
Leathers was drafted 25th overall by Kansas City Wizards in the 2008 MLS SuperDraft and made his MLS debut in Kansas City's first match of the 2008 season against D.C. United on March 29, 2008. He was selected by expansion team Vancouver Whitecaps FC in the 8th round of the 2010 MLS Expansion Draft.

He remained with Vancouver for the 2011 season. At season's end, his contract expired and he entered the 2011 MLS Re-Entry Draft. Leathers was not selected in the draft and became a free agent.

Leathers returned to the game after a two-year break when he signed with USL club Charlotte Eagles.

=== International ===
Leathers made two appearances for the US U-23 national team at the 2008 Toulon Tournament.

=== Coaching ===
Leathers coaches with CoachUp, a private coaching service.
