= Eloy Colombano =

Argentine footballer (born 1983)

Personal information
- Full name: Emmanuel Eloy Colombano
- Date of birth: June 15, 1983 (age 43)
- Place of birth: Pehuajo, Argentina
- Height: 5 ft 8 in (1.73 m)
- Position: Midfielder

Team information
- Current team: Defensores del Este
- Number: 10

Youth career
- Atletico Villegas: Estudiantes de la plata

Senior career*
Years	Team	Apps	(Gls)
2001–2005	Estudiantes de La Plata	11	(0)
2005–2006	Defensa y Justicia	18	(1)
2007–2008	Kansas City Wizards	17	(1)
2008–2010	Atlanta		
2010–2014	Club Atletico UAI Uquiza		
2014_2015	Ferrocarril Sud de Olavarria		
2015	Club Atletico Defensores Del Este		
2016	Club Atletico Estuadiantes Unidos		
2017	Club Atletico Defensores del Este		
- * Club domestic league appearances and goals as of 22:24, April 20, 2009 (UTC)

Emmanuel Eloy Colombano (born June 15, 1983, in Pehuajo) is an Argentine footballer who plays for Club Defensores del este, de la LPF (Liga Pehuajense de Futbol).

Colombano played for Estudiantes de La Plata from 2001 to 2005 in the Primera División Argentina.

== Defensa Y Justicia ==
He then played for Defensa y Justicia from 2005 to 2006 in the Primera B Nacional Argentina.

== Kanzas City Wizards ==
The Kansas City Wizards of Major League Soccer signed him on August 8, 2007, but he was released on June 21, 2008. He played 17 games for the Wizards and scored one goal.
