= Aaron Hohlbein =

American soccer player (born 1985)

Personal information
- Full name: Aaron Hohlbein
- Date of birth: August 16, 1985 (age 41)
- Place of birth: Middleton, Wisconsin, United States
- Height: 6 ft 0 in (1.83 m)
- Position: Defender

College career
Years	Team	Apps	(Gls)
2003–2006	Wisconsin Badgers	77	(6)

Senior career*
Years	Team	Apps	(Gls)
2004	Michigan Bucks	12	(0)
2006	Princeton 56ers		
2007–2010	Kansas City Wizards	43	(2)
2010	→ Miami FC (loan)	10	(0)
2011	Fort Lauderdale Strikers	14	(0)

Managerial career
- 2015–2023: Wisconsin Badgers (asst.)
- 2023–: Forward Madison FC (asst.)
- * Club domestic league appearances and goals as of June 4, 2011

Aaron Hohlbein (born August 16, 1985) is an American former professional soccer player who is currently an assistant coach for Forward Madison FC in USL League One.

== Career ==
=== College and amateur ===
Hohlbein played college soccer at the University of Wisconsin–Madison from 2003 to 2006. Over four years he started in all 77 of his appearances and managed 6 goals and 7 assists. During his college years he also played with the Michigan Bucks of the United Soccer Leagues and the Princeton 56ers in the National Premier Soccer League.

=== Professional ===
He was drafted in the first round, 3rd overall, by the Kansas City Wizards in 2007 MLS Supplemental Draft. On August 5, 2010, he was loaned to Miami FC for the remainder of the USSF D2 Pro League.

Hohlbein was chosen by the Columbus Crew with the second selection of stage 1 of the 2010 MLS Re-Entry Draft on December 8, 2010. He elected not to sign with the Major League Soccer club and instead signed with Miami FC, later renamed Fort Lauderdale Strikers, of the second-tier North American Soccer League on February 1, 2011. The captain and a mainstay at the center of the Strikers' defense, Hohlbein suffered a knee injury in July that ruled him out for the rest of the campaign. The Fort Lauderdale Strikers released Hohlbein at the end of the 2011 season.

== Coaching ==
Hohlbein joined the coaching staff of the Wisconsin Badgers men's soccer team in 2015 and as an assistant coach.

In 2023, Hohlbein left the Wisconsin Badgers program to join Forward Madison FC as an assistant coach, as well as to become the leader of their Forward Futures program.
