= Kurt Morsink =

American-Costa Rican footballer (born 1984)

Personal information
- Full name: Kurt Morsink Ramos
- Date of birth: June 27, 1984 (age 42)
- Place of birth: Orlando, Florida. United States
- Height: 5 ft 10 in (1.78 m)
- Position: Midfielder

Youth career
- Alajuelense

College career
Years	Team	Apps	(Gls)
2003–2006	James Madison Dukes		

Senior career*
Years	Team	Apps	(Gls)
2002–2003	Bradenton Academics		
2004–2005	Cape Cod Crusaders	31	(4)
2006	Bradenton Academics	10	(1)
2007–2009	Kansas City Wizards	47	(0)
2010–2012	D.C. United	22	(0)
Total		110	(5)
- * Club domestic league appearances and goals as of August 9, 2012

Kurt Morsink Ramos (born June 27, 1984) is a Costa Rican and American former professional soccer player.

== Career ==
=== College and amateur ===
Morsink was born on June 27, 1984, in Orlando, Florida, from American father and Costa Rican mother. From childhood, he raised in San José, Costa Rica. Growing up, he played for Costa Rican powerhouse Alajuelense's youth system; but, he never played with the Alajuelense first team. He was a member of the U-15 Costa Rica national team. He joined the US U17 National team 84 age group for the residency program at IMG Academy in Bradenton Florida, although he never played an official match. He played collegiate soccer at James Madison University from 2003 to 2006. He started 73 out of 76 games scoring 32 goals and assisting on 29. He was an All Conference and All American as well as the National Player of the Week. During his college years he also played with both Bradenton Academics and Cape Cod Crusaders in the USL Premier Development League.

=== Professional ===
Morsink was drafted by the Kansas City Wizards in the 4th round of the 2007 MLS SuperDraft (No. 42 overall) with their third pick. Started in all play-off games his rookie year, a team whom lost in the Western Conference Finals to eventual MLS Cup champions Houston Dynamo. After three seasons with the club, Morsink was traded to D.C. United in February 2010. After struggling with injuries, Morsink retired from playing professional soccer on August 9, 2012.
