= Eric Kronberg =

American soccer player

Personal information
- Date of birth: June 7, 1983 (age 43)
- Place of birth: Santa Rosa, California, United States
- Position: Goalkeeper

College career
Years	Team	Apps	(Gls)
2002–2003	Fresno State Bulldogs		
2004–2005	California Golden Bears		

Senior career*
Years	Team	Apps	(Gls)
2004–2005	Sonoma County Sol		
2006–2014	Sporting Kansas City	25	(0)
2006	→ Miami FC (loan)	11	(0)
2015–2017	Montreal Impact	5	(0)
2015	→ FC Montreal (loan)	2	(0)

Managerial career
- 2018–2019: Sacramento Republic (assistant)
- 2020: Portland Timbers 2 (assistant)
- 2021–: Portland Pilots (assistant)
- * Club domestic league appearances and goals as of 14:40, 29 October 2017 (UTC)

Eric Kronberg (/ˈkrɒnbɜːrɡ/; born June 7, 1983) is an American former professional soccer player who played as a goalkeeper.

== Career ==
Kronberg was drafted in the fourth round (40th overall) of the 2006 MLS Superdraft by the Kansas City Wizards. Kronberg made his MLS debut in a 4–1 win against the San Jose Earthquakes on October 23, 2010. He continued as a backup with the renamed Sporting Kansas City franchise through 2013. In 2014, following the retirement of Jimmy Nielsen, Kronberg was finally given the starting nod for Sporting Kansas City. However, a broken finger in July 2014 essentially ended Kronberg's season.

Kansas City declined the 2015 contract option for Kronberg and in December 2014 he entered the 2014 MLS Re-Entry Draft. He was chosen by Montreal Impact with the first selection in the re-entry draft. He was out-of-contract following the 2017 season.
