= Michael Kraus (soccer) =

American soccer player

Personal information
- Full name: Michael Kraus
- Date of birth: September 10, 1984 (age 42)
- Place of birth: Memphis, Tennessee, United States
- Height: 5 ft 9 in (1.75 m)
- Positions: Midfielder; forward

Youth career
- 2003–2006: Creighton Bluejays

Senior career*
Years	Team	Apps	(Gls)
2004	Memphis Express	27	(13)
2005	Des Moines Menace	19	(5)
2007–2009	Kansas City Wizards	11	(1)
2012	FC Tucson	5	(0)

Managerial career
- 2022–2023: Grand Canyon
- * Club domestic league appearances and goals as of August 2, 2012

Michael Kraus (born September 10, 1984, in Memphis, Tennessee) is an American soccer former player and coach. In 2022 Kraus was hired to be the head coach of Grand Canyon University.

== Career ==
=== College and amateur ===
Kraus played college soccer at Creighton University, where he was named the Missouri Valley Conference Player of the Year in 2006, the same year he served as Creighton's team captain. He was named First-Team All-MVC in 2006 and Second-Team All-MVC in 2005. He was named MVC Offensive Player of the Week four times in his collegiate career.

In 2004, Kraus played with the Memphis Express in the USL Premier Development League in 2004, and played again in the PDL with Des Moines Menace in 2005.

In 2002, Kraus was named Tennessee Player of the Year as a high school senior. He played youth soccer for Memphis Futbol Club for 9 years under Coach Richard Bute.

=== Professional ===
Kraus was drafted 48th by the Kansas City Wizards in the 2007 MLS Supplemental Draft. He made his MLS debut against Colorado Rapids on March 28, 2009, coming on as a 67th-minute substitute, and scored his first MLS goal one minute later. Kraus was released by Kansas City on March 23, 2010. (With the waiving of Kraus, the Kansas City Wizards roster was at the 24-player limit required by MLS.)

== Honors ==
=== Des Moines Menace ===
- USL Premier Development League Champions (1): 2005

=== Personal ===
Kraus is fifth youngest of six children. His father is a doctor of internal medicine in Memphis, TN. He majored in psychology at Creighton University. He enjoys watching Seinfeld re-runs and reading books by one of his favorite authors, Greg Iles.
