= Lance Watson =

American soccer player (born 1983)

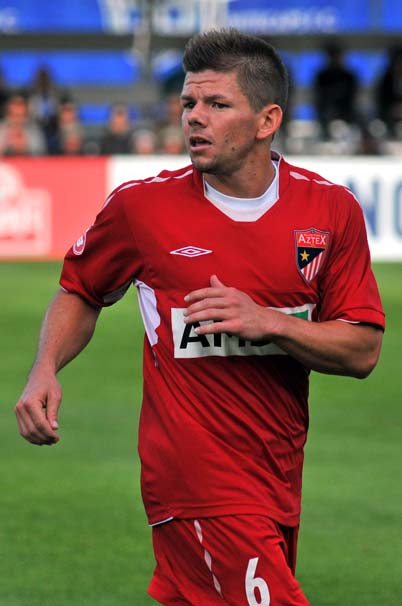

Personal information
- Full name: Lance Watson
- Date of birth: October 6, 1983 (age 43)
- Place of birth: Nederland, Texas, United States
- Height: 5 ft 7 in (1.70 m)
- Positions: Midfielder; defender

Youth career
- 2002–2005: New Mexico Lobos

Senior career*
Years	Team	Apps	(Gls)
2004	Indiana Invaders	13	(3)
2005	Chicago Fire Premier	5	(0)
2006–2009	Kansas City Wizards	36	(0)
2010	Austin Aztex	26	(2)
- * Club domestic league appearances and goals as of October 1, 2010

Lance Watson (born October 6, 1983, in Nederland, Texas) is an American soccer player.

== Career ==
=== College and amateur ===
Watson played college soccer at the University of New Mexico from 2002 to 2005. He finished his career with 22 assists, good enough for second all-time in school history, and helped lead the Lobos to the 2005 NCAA Championship game. He also played in the USL Premier Development League, for Indiana Invaders in 2004 and Chicago Fire Premier in 2005.

=== Professional ===
Watson was drafted in the second round, 16th overall, by the Kansas City Wizards in 2006 MLS SuperDraft. After four seasons with the Wizards, Watson was released on March 1, 2010. On March 30, 2010, the Austin Aztex announced the signing of Watson to a two-year contract.

Watson signed a two-year deal with USSF Division 2 club Austin Aztex in March 2010.
