= Michael Harrington (soccer) =

American soccer player (born 1986)

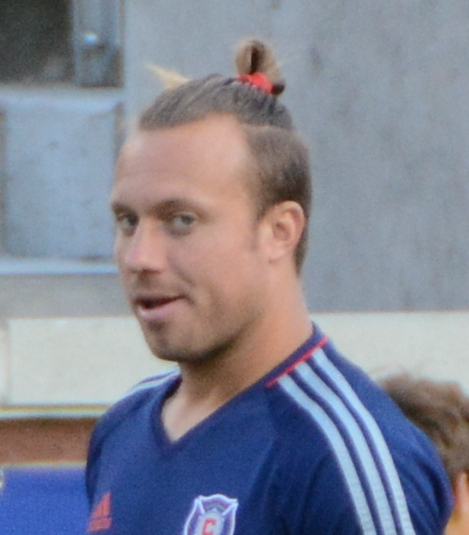
- Harrington with Chicago Fire in 2017

Personal information
- Date of birth: January 24, 1986 (age 40)
- Place of birth: Greenville, North Carolina, United States
- Height: 6 ft 0 in (1.83 m)
- Position: Defender

Youth career
- 2001–2003: IMG Soccer Academy

College career
Years	Team	Apps	(Gls)
2003–2006	North Carolina Tar Heels		

Senior career*
Years	Team	Apps	(Gls)
2004–2006	Raleigh CASL Elite	10	(1)
2007–2012	Sporting Kansas City	149	(5)
2013–2014	Portland Timbers	58	(0)
2015	Colorado Rapids	14	(0)
2016–2017	Chicago Fire	28	(0)
2018	North Carolina FC	24	(0)
Total		283	(6)

International career^{‡}
2003	United States U17	1	(0)

Managerial career
- 2019–: North Carolina Tar Heels (assistant)
- * Club domestic league appearances and goals as of 12:21, 15 October 2018 (UTC) ‡ National team caps and goals as of October 24, 2012

Michael Harrington (born January 24, 1986) is an American retired soccer player who is currently an assistant coach the University of North Carolina.

== Career ==
=== College and amateur ===
Born in the North Carolina city of Greenville, Harrington attended the University of North Carolina at Chapel Hill where he played on the men's college soccer team from 2003 to 2006. During the collegiate off season, he also played for the Raleigh CASL Elite of the Premier Development League.

=== Professional ===
Harrington was selected in the first round (third overall) of the 2007 MLS SuperDraft by Kansas City Wizards. He finished 3rd overall in voting for Rookie of the Year.

After six years with Kansas City, Harrington was traded to Portland Timbers in December 2012 in exchange for allocation money. He was traded to the Colorado Rapids in exchange for allocation money following the 2014 season.

In January 2016, Harrington signed with the Chicago Fire.

In January 2018, Harrington signed with USL hometown side North Carolina FC.

=== International ===
Harrington was a member of the U-17 Residency Program at the Bradenton Academy and while there played for the US at the 2003 FIFA U-17 World Championship in Finland in which the team reached the quarterfinals. Two years later Harrington represented America at the 2005 FIFA World Youth Championship in the Netherlands.

=== Coaching ===
In 2019, Harrington returned to his alma mater, the University of North Carolina to take a job as an assistant coach with the men's soccer team.

== Honors ==
=== Sporting Kansas City ===
- Lamar Hunt U.S. Open Cup: 2012
