= Herculez Gomez =

American soccer player and TV Pundit (born 1982)

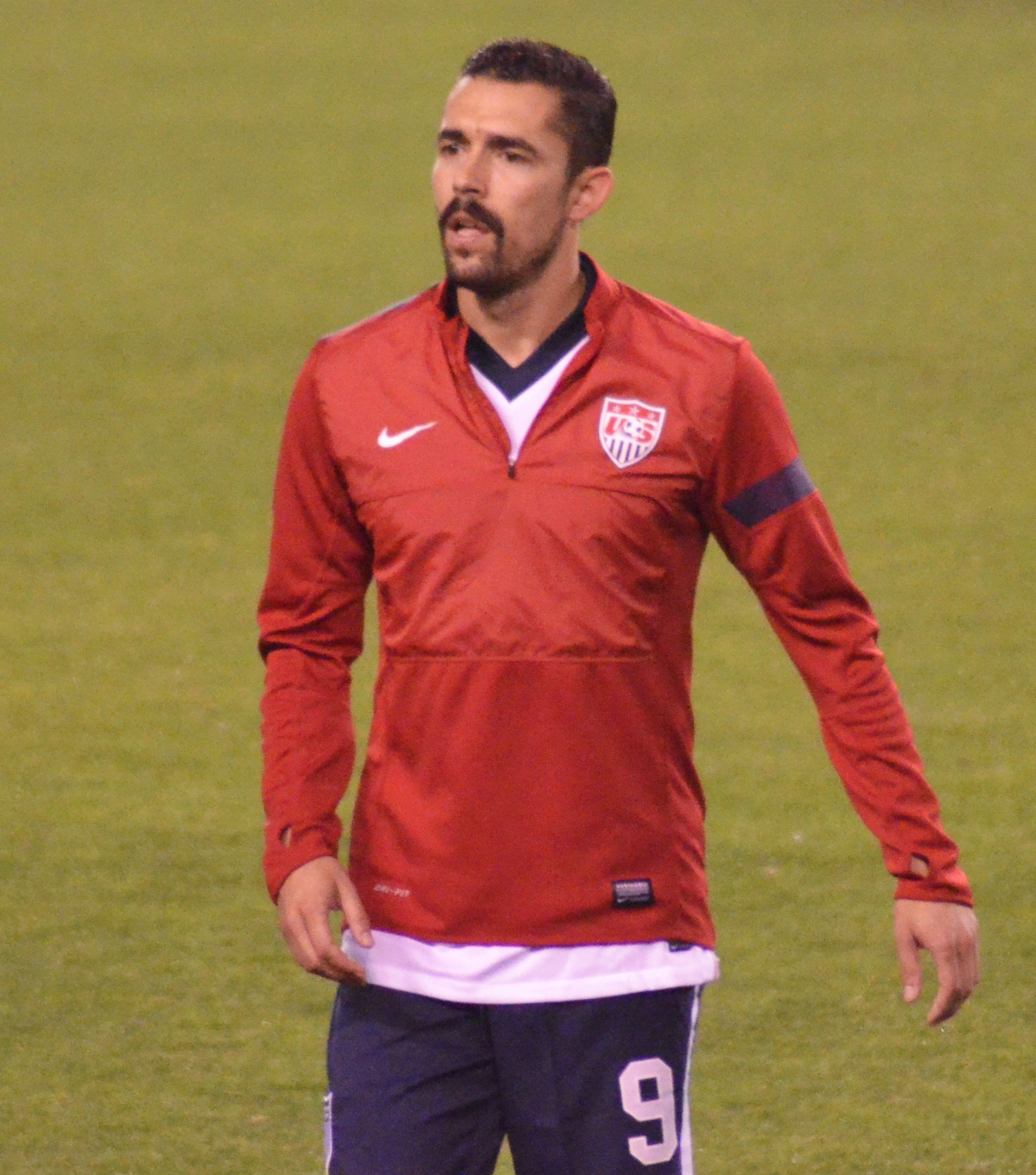
- Gomez warming up for the United States in 2013

Personal information
- Full name: Herculez Gomez
- Date of birth: April 6, 1982 (age 44)
- Place of birth: Oxnard, California, U.S.
- Height: 5 ft 10 in (1.78 m)
- Position: Forward

Youth career
- 1996–2000: Las Vegas High School

Senior career*
Years	Team	Apps	(Gls)
2001–2002	Cruz Azul		
2002	San Diego Gauchos	17	(17)
2002–2006	LA Galaxy	53	(16)
2003	→ Seattle Sounders (loan)	17	(1)
2004	→ San Diego Sockers (loan)	10	(5)
2007–2008	Colorado Rapids	37	(6)
2008–2009	Kansas City Wizards	34	(1)
2010	Puebla	15	(10)
2010–2011	Pachuca	29	(5)
2011	Tecos	16	(7)
2012–2013	Santos Laguna	45	(13)
2013–2015	Tijuana	21	(0)
2014	→ Tigres UANL (loan)	15	(1)
2015	→ Puebla (loan)	13	(1)
2015	Toronto FC	7	(1)
2016	Seattle Sounders FC	21	(0)
Total		350	(85)

International career
2007–2013	United States	24	(6)
Medal record
Men's soccer
Representing United States
CONCACAF Gold Cup
Winner	2013 United States
- * Club domestic league appearances and goals

Herculez Gomez (born April 6, 1982) is an American former professional soccer player and current sports commentator. A pioneering Chicano athlete, Gómez is the first American to win both the Liga MX and Copa MX Golden Boots, the first American to lead a foreign league in scoring, a two-time CONCACAF Champions Cup finalist, a top-10 all-time scorer in the competition, and one of the most respected bilingual voices in soccer media, particularly within CONCACAF.

== Early life and background ==
Gomez was born in Los Angeles, California, into a Mexican American family as the oldest of five children. His parents are from Altos de Jalisco, Mexico, with his father from Tepatitlán and his mother from Jalostotitlán. He spent his early childhood in Oxnard before moving to Las Vegas, Nevada, at age 9.

After high school, Gomez moved to Mexico in 2000 and earned a spot with Águilas Blancas de Puebla, a second-division club. The stint was short-lived, and in 2001 he returned to the United States and earned a spot with the San Diego Gauchos of the USL through an open tryout. Gomez scored 17 goals during the 2002 season with the Gauchos, helping earn his move into Major League Soccer.

== Club career Overview ==
=== LA Galaxy ===
During his time with the LA Galaxy, Gomez helped the club win the 2002 MLS Cup. In 2005, he recorded a breakout season with 11 league goals, while also helping the club win the MLS Cup and U.S. Open Cup. He was named the club's team MVP and earned the U.S. Open Cup Golden Boot that season.

=== MLS ===
Gomez broke his foot while on loan to the Seattle Sounders of the United Soccer Leagues, and recovery took a long time. When he was able to play again, he joined the San Diego Sockers of the Major Indoor Soccer League. He returned to the Galaxy for the 2005 season on a developmental contract, and played well enough to make it to the first team. His big chance came when Landon Donovan was called up to the national team. Donovan's absence gave Gomez many more starts at striker, and he was able to shine as a breakout goal-scorer.

He scored the game-winning goal in the 2005 U.S. Open Cup Final, then helped the Galaxy to a rare Cup 'double' when they also won the 2005 MLS Cup. Gomez ended the 2005 season with eighteen goals scored for the Galaxy (in all matches), and was voted by the local L.A. media as the year's Most Valuable Player.

Early in the 2006 season, Gomez was moved to the bench with then-coach Steve Sampson. Sampson used Gomez as a midfielder to see if he could score goals running at defenses. After Sampson's firing, however, Gomez scored several times under new coach Frank Yallop, and ended that season with five goals.

In December 2006, Gomez was traded to the Colorado Rapids along with Ugo Ihemelu in exchange for Joe Cannon. He scored the first goal in the history of Dick's Sporting Goods Park in his first game for Colorado, a 2–1 win over D.C. United on April 7, 2007. Gomez tore his ACL during training with the Rapids in September of that year and underwent a lengthy recovery process.

Gomez was traded to Kansas City Wizards in exchange for allocation money, a fourth round 2009 MLS SuperDraft pick and a first round 2009 MLS Supplemental Draft pick in September 2008. His only goal for the Wizards was an injury time winner against San Jose Earthquakes, a must win game in their 2008 play-offs push.

=== Mexico ===
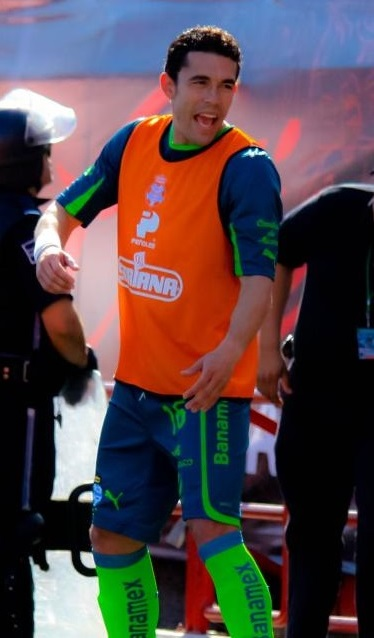
Gomez playing for Santos Laguna in 2012

After being released by Kansas City in late 2009, Gomez signed with Mexican club Puebla in January 2010. He scored ten goals in the 2010 Mexican season to tie for the lead for most goals; this feat marked the first time any American player led a foreign league in goals. He moved to Pachuca in the summer 2010 window.

Pachuca placed Gomez, along with its entire squad, on the transfer list. During the transfer window he moved along with teammate Braulio Luna to Estudiantes Tecos. Gomez scored his first goal for his new club in the second game of the Mexico Apertura season, coming in a 2–1 loss to San Luis. On August 19, Gomez scored the winner as a sub against his former club Pachuca.

Cash-strapped Estudiantes Tecos were forced into selling Gomez to league rivals Santos Laguna in December 2011. Gomez scored 11 goals in his first 12 appearances for the team across all competitions.

With Santos Laguna's 2012 Clausura victory, Gomez became the first player to have won both the MLS Cup and the Primera División championship. In 2013, he moved to Club Tijuana. After struggling with Tijuana, he was loaned to Tigres UANL for the 2014–15 season. However, he ended the season poorly with only one goal. His loan was not extended.

=== Return to MLS ===
In August 2015, Gomez joined Toronto FC.

After his release from Toronto at the beginning of the 2016 MLS season, Gomez joined Seattle Sounders FC. He won MLS Cup for the second time in his career. He retired following the season and joined ESPN as an analyst.

== International career ==
Gomez was named to the United States roster for the 2007 Copa America and earned his first cap as a second-half substitute against Argentina, with his first start coming against Colombia.

After a lengthy absence from the national team, Gomez was named to the provisional 30-man U.S. squad for the 2010 FIFA World Cup after a highly productive club season in Mexico. He scored a goal for the U.S. national team in a 4–2 friendly defeat to the Czech Republic on May 25; the next day he was named to the final 23-man squad. Gomez played in 3 out of the 4 games for the United States at the World Cup, including the round of 16 game against Ghana.

Gomez made his return to the national team in 2012, appearing in friendlies against Scotland and Brazil and scoring a goal against the latter. Later in 2012, he scored goals in World Cup qualifying against Antigua and Barbuda and Jamaica

His last national team appearance came during the 2013 CONCACAF Gold Cup.

== Broadcaster ==
In January 2017, Gomez announced his retirement from professional soccer, and joined the broadcasting team at ESPN. He typically appears as a studio analyst / pundit for ESPN FC, MLS games, and U.S. National Team games. Also, he is the co-host of several podcasts, most notably the Max and Herc podcast with Max Bretos, where they discuss news around Major League Soccer and the United States national team, and the Two on Tri podcast with Sebastian Salazar, where they discuss the Liga MX, the Mexico national team, and Mexican players abroad.

He and Salazar also host "Fútbol Americas" on ESPN+.

== Personal life ==
Gomez identifies as Chicano. He is the brother of MMA fighter Ulysses Gomez.

== Career statistics ==
=== Club ===
Club performance			League		Cup		League Cup		Continental		Total	
Season	Club	League	Apps	Goals	Apps	Goals	Apps	Goals	Apps	Goals	Apps	Goals
USA			League		Cup		League Cup		CONCACAF		Total	
2003	LA Galaxy	Major League Soccer	1	0	0	0	0	0	90	0	1	0
2003	Seattle Sounders	A-League	17	1	0	0	4	0	0	0	21	1
2005	LA Galaxy	Major League Soccer	22	11	4	6	4	1	0	0	30	18
2006	LA Galaxy	Major League Soccer	30	5	1	0	0	0	0	0	31	5
2007	Colorado Rapids	Major League Soccer	20	4	1	1	0	0	0	0	21	5
2008	Colorado Rapids	Major League Soccer	17	2	0	0	0	0	0	0	17	2
2008	Kansas City Wizards	Major League Soccer	8	1	0	0	1	0	0	0	9	1
2009	Kansas City Wizards	Major League Soccer	26	0	2	0	0	0	0	0	28	0
Mexico			League		Cup		League Cup		CONCACAF		Total	
2009–10	Puebla	Liga MX	15	10	0	0	–		–		15	10
2010–11	Pachuca	Liga MX	29	5	0	0	–		–		29	5
2011–12	Tecos	Liga MX	16	7	0	0	–		–		16	7
2011–12	Santos Laguna	Liga MX	17	7	0	0	–		6	6	23	13
2012–13	Santos Laguna	Liga MX	33	8	0	0	–		10	3	43	11
2013–14	Tijuana	Liga MX	21	0	0	0	–		4	3	25	3
2014–15	Tigres UANL (loan)	Liga MX	15	0	7	5	–		–		22	5
2014–15	Puebla (loan)	Liga MX	13	1	7	2	–		–		20	3
Canada			League		Cup		League Cup		CONCACAF		Total	
2015	Toronto FC	Major League Soccer	7	1	0	0	2	0	–		8	1
USA			League		Cup		MLS Cup		CONCACAF		Total	
2016	Seattle Sounders FC	Major League Soccer	21	0	3	1	1	0	–		25	1
Total	USA/Canada		169	25	11	8	12	1	0	0	192	33
Total	Mexico		131	37	14	7	0	0	20	12	165	56
Career total			300	62	25	15	12	1	20	12	357	90

=== International ===
National team	Year	Apps	Goals
United States
United States	2007	2	0
United States	2008	0	0
United States	2009	0	0
United States	2010	6	2
United States	2011	0	0
United States	2012	11	3
United States	2013	5	1
Total		24	6

No.	Date	Venue	Opponent	Score	Result	Competition
1	May 25, 2010	Rentschler Field, East Hartford, United States	Czech Republic	2–2	2–4	Friendly
2	June 5, 2010	Ruimsig Stadium, Roodepoort, South Africa	Australia	3–1	3–1	Friendly
3	May 30, 2012	FedExField, Landover, United States	Brazil	1–2	1–4	Friendly
4	June 8, 2012	Raymond James Stadium, Tampa, United States	Antigua and Barbuda	3–1	3–1	2014 FIFA World Cup qualification
5	September 11, 2012	Columbus Crew Stadium, Columbus, United States	Jamaica	1–0	1–0	2014 FIFA World Cup qualification
6	July 5, 2013	Qualcomm Stadium, San Diego, United States	Guatemala	1–0	6–0	Friendly

== Honors ==
LA Galaxy

- MLS Cup: 2002, 2005
- Supporters' Shield: 2002
- U.S. Open Cup: 2005

Seattle Sounders FC

- MLS Cup: 2016

Santos Laguna

- Mexican Primera División: Clausura 2012

Puebla

- Copa MX: Clausura 2015
- Supercopa MX: 2015

United States

- CONCACAF Gold Cup: 2013

Individual

- Las Vegas High School Notable Alumni
- U.S. Open Cup Top scorer: 2005 (Shared)
- LA Galaxy Silver Boot: 2005
- LA Galaxy Player of the Year: 2005
- L.A.R.S Player Of The Year: 2005
- L.A. Media Year's Most Valuable Player: 2005
- MLS Goal of the Week: Week 2 2007
- Puebla Top Scorer: 2009–10
- Liga MX Bicentenario Golden Boot: 2010 (Shared)
- Copa MX Clausura Top scorer: 2015 (Shared)
- Telly Award General-Sports: 2023
- World Soccer Talk Awards Best Podcast Analyst: 2023
- Emmy Awards Nomination: 2024
