= 2014 Sporting Kansas City season =

Sporting Kansas City
2014 season
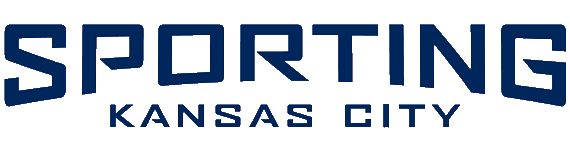
- Owner: Sporting Club
- Head coach: Peter Vermes
- Stadium: Sporting Park
- MLS: East: 5 Overall: 10
- MLS Cup: Knockout Round
- U.S. Open Cup: Fifth round
- 2013-14 CONCACAF Champions League: Quarterfinals
- 2014-15 CONCACAF Champions League: Group stage
- Walt Disney World Pro Soccer Classic: Runners-up
- Top goalscorer: League: Dom Dwyer; All: Dom Dwyer 24
- Highest home attendance: MLS: 21,493; All: 21,493
- Lowest home attendance: MLS: 18,938; All: 11,138
- Average home league attendance: MLS: 19,950; All Competitions: 18,957
Home colors	Away colors	Third colors

The 2014 Sporting Kansas City season was the nineteenth season of the team's existence in Major League Soccer and the fourth year played under the Sporting Kansas City moniker.

Sporting Kansas City entered the season in the 2013–14 CONCACAF Champions League championship stage for the first time in franchise history.

Sporting Kansas City also entered the season as the defending MLS Cup champion, after beating Real Salt Lake in PKs in the MLS Cup 2013.

== Squad ==
=== First team roster ===
As of August 17, 2014.

No.	Position	Nation	Player
1	GK	USA	Eric Kronberg
2	DF	USA	Erik Palmer-Brown (HGP)
3	DF	USA	Ike Opara
4	DF	USA	Kevin Ellis (HGP)
5	DF	USA	Matt Besler (Captain & DP)
6	MF	BRA	Paulo Nagamura
7	DF	USA	Chance Myers
8	MF	USA	Graham Zusi (DP)
9	MF	ESP	Antonio Dovale
10	MF	USA	Benny Feilhaber
11	MF	USA	Sal Zizzo
12	MF	USA	Mikey Lopez (GA)
13	DF	KEN	Lawrence Olum
14	FW	ENG	Dom Dwyer
15	DF	USA	Seth Sinovic
16	FW	ARG	Claudio Bieler (DP)
17	FW	USA	C. J. Sapong
18	MF	ESP	Victor Muñoz
20	MF	HON	Jorge Claros
21	GK	USA	Jon Kempin (HGP)
22	FW	LBN	Soony Saad
24	MF	GHA	Michael Kafari
25	MF	USA	Christian Duke
30	GK	USA	Andy Gruenebaum
37	MF	USA	Jacob Peterson
40	DF	BRA	Igor Julião (on loan from Fluminense)
78	DF	FRA	Aurélien Collin

== Player movement ==
=== In ===
Date	Player	Position	Previous club	Fee/notes	Ref
December 13, 2013	(United States) Sal Zizzo	MF	(United States) Portland Timbers	Trade for Allocation Money	
December 16, 2013	(United States) Andy Gruenebaum	GK	(United States) Columbus Crew	Trade for 2016 MLS SuperDraft Pick	
February 13, 2014	(Colombia) Jimmy Medranda	MF	(Colombia) Deportivo Pereira	Fee	
March 4, 2014	(Uruguay) Alex Martinez	MF	(United States) NCSU	2014 MLS SuperDraft Selection	
March 11, 2014	(Spain) Antonio Rodríguez Dovale	MF	(Spain) Celta de Vigo	Free	
April 1, 2014	(Spain) Victor Muñoz	MF	(United States) D.C. United	Free	
July 8, 2014	(Ghana) Michael Kafari	MF	(United States) Charleston Battery	Free	
July 16, 2014	(Honduras) Jorge Claros	MF	(Honduras) C.D. Motagua	Free	
July 16, 2014	(Philippines) Martin Steuble	MF	(Germany) FC Wil 1900	Free	
August 13, 2014	(United States) Tim Melia	GK	(United States) Chivas USA	League Pool Call-up	

=== Out ===
Pos.	Player	New club	Fee/notes	Date	Ref
GK	(Denmark) Jimmy Nielsen	(United States) Oklahoma City Energy FC Coach	Retired from playing	December 9, 2013	
DF	(United States) Kyle Miller	(United States) Oklahoma City Energy FC	Waived	December 12, 2013	
DF	(United States) Brendan Ruiz		Waived	December 12, 2013	
DF	(Argentina) Federico Bessone	(England) Millwall	Released (Out of contract)	January 2, 2014	
FW	(United States) Teal Bunbury	(United States) New England Revolution	Trade for first round 2015 MLS SuperDraft pick and allocation money	February 19, 2013	
DF	(United States) Josh Gardner		Waived	March 25, 2014	
DF	(Haiti) Mechack Jerome	(Canada) Montreal Impact	Waived	March 31, 2014	
MF	(Spain) Oriol Rosell	Sporting Clube de Portugal	Fee	June 3, 2014	
MF	(Uruguay) Alex Martinez	(United States) Orange County Blues FC	Waived	June 30, 2014	
MF	(Haiti) Peterson Joseph		Mutually Terminated	August 11, 2014	
GK	(United States) Tim Melia	(United States) Sporting Kansas City	League Pool Call-up Ended	September 3, 2014	

=== Loans ===
==== In ====
No.	Pos.	Player	Loaned from	Start	End	Source
40	DF	(Brazil) Igor Julião	(Brazil) Fluminense FC	April 4, 2014	December 31, 2014	

==== Out ====
No.	Pos.	Player	Loaned to	Start	End	Source
12	MF	(United States) Mikey Lopez	(United States) Orlando City Soccer Club	March 17, 2014	June 30, 2014	
21	GK	(United States) Jon Kempin	(United States) Oklahoma City Energy FC	March 17, 2014	July 9, 2014	
25	MF	(United States) Christian Duke	(United States) Oklahoma City Energy FC	March 17, 2014	June 4, 2014	
4	DF	(United States) Kevin Ellis	(United States) Oklahoma City Energy FC	April 21, 2014	May 16, 2014	

== Competitions ==
=== Match results ===
Win Tie Loss

=== Preseason ===
==== Desert Friendlies ====
January 28, 2014	Sporting Kansas City	1–0	FC Tucson	Tucson, Arizona
12:00 CST	Sapong 20'	Report	Salciccia (yellow card) 44'	Stadium: North Stadium at Kino Sports Complex

February 1, 2014	Sporting Kansas City	1–1	Portland Timbers	Tucson, Arizona
19:00 CST	Collin (yellow card) 13' (red card) 33'; Schmetz (yellow card) 22'; Zizzo 31'	Report	Fernández (yellow card) 36'; Danso (yellow card) 75'; Tshuma 84'; Nanchoff (yellow card) 88'	Stadium: North Stadium at Kino Sports Complex

February 7, 2014	Sporting Kansas City	3–1	Indy Eleven	Casa Grande, Arizona
12:00 CST	Bieler 9'; Sapong 11'; Zizzo 46'; Schmetz (yellow card) 75'	Report	1'; (yellow card) 56'	Stadium: Grande Sports World

==== Walt Disney World Pro Soccer Classic ====
Kickoff times are in CST (UTC-06) unless shown otherwise

February 19, 2014 1	New York Red Bulls	0–1	Sporting Kansas City	Lake Buena Vista, Florida
14:00			Peterson 65'	Stadium: ESPN Wide World of Sports Complex

February 22, 2014 2	Fluminense FC U23	0–3	Sporting Kansas City	Lake Buena Vista, Florida
14:00		Report	Medranda (yellow card) 18' (goal) 55'; Nagamura 40', 58'	Stadium: ESPN Wide World of Sports Complex

February 26, 2014 3	Sporting Kansas City	3–2	Montreal Impact	Lake Buena Vista, Florida
19:00	Dwyer 9' (pen.), 43' (yellow card) 58'; Myers (yellow card) 53'; Zizzo 75'	Report	Nyassi 1'; Felipe 30' (pen.); Bernardello (yellow card) 55'; Tissot (yellow card) 77'	Stadium: ESPN Wide World of Sports Complex

March 1, 2014 Championship match	Columbus Crew	4–1	Sporting Kansas City	Lake Buena Vista, Florida
19:00	Trapp (yellow card) 18'; Arrieta 20'; Parkhurst (yellow card) 45'; Añor 69'; Meram 74'; Higuaín 84'	Report	Zusi (yellow card) 56'; Bieler 87'	Stadium: ESPN Wide World of Sports Complex

=== Major League Soccer ===
==== League table ====
Pos	Team	Pld	W	L	T	GF	GA	GD	Pts	Qualification
1	Seattle Sounders FC (S, U)	34	20	10	4	65	50	+15	64	Qualification for the CONCACAF Champions League
2	LA Galaxy (C)	34	17	7	10	69	37	+32	61	Qualification for the CONCACAF Champions League
3	D.C. United	34	17	9	8	52	37	+15	59	Qualification for the CONCACAF Champions League
4	Real Salt Lake	34	15	8	11	54	39	+15	56	Qualification for the CONCACAF Champions League
5	New England Revolution	34	17	13	4	51	46	+5	55	
6	FC Dallas	34	16	12	6	55	45	+10	54	
7	Columbus Crew	34	14	10	10	52	42	+10	52	
8	New York Red Bulls	34	13	10	11	55	50	+5	50	
9	Vancouver Whitecaps FC	34	12	8	14	42	40	+2	50	Qualification for the CONCACAF Champions League
10	Sporting Kansas City	34	14	13	7	48	41	+7	49	
11	Portland Timbers	34	12	9	13	61	52	+9	49	
12	Philadelphia Union	34	10	12	12	51	51	0	42	
13	Toronto FC	34	11	15	8	44	54	−10	41	
14	Houston Dynamo	34	11	17	6	39	58	−19	39	
15	Chicago Fire	34	6	10	18	41	51	−10	36	
16	Chivas USA	34	9	19	6	29	61	−32	33	
17	Colorado Rapids	34	8	18	8	43	62	−19	32	
18	San Jose Earthquakes	34	6	16	12	35	50	−15	30	
19	Montreal Impact (V)	34	6	18	10	38	58	−20	28	

Source: MLS
Rules for classification: 1) points; 2) head-to-head record; 3) goal difference; 4) number of goals scored
(C) MLS Cup champions; (S) Supporters' Shield winners; (U) U.S. Open Cup winners; (V) Canadian Championship winners

==== Eastern Conference standings ====
Pos	Team	Pld	W	L	T	GF	GA	GD	Pts	Qualification
1	D.C. United	34	17	9	8	52	37	+15	59	Qualification for the conference semifinals
2	New England Revolution	34	17	13	4	51	37	+14	55	Qualification for the conference semifinals
3	Columbus Crew SC	34	14	10	10	52	42	+10	52	Qualification for the conference semifinals
4	New York Red Bulls	34	13	10	11	55	50	+5	50	Qualification for the knockout round
5	Sporting Kansas City	34	14	13	7	48	41	+7	49	Qualification for the knockout round
6	Philadelphia Union	34	10	12	12	51	51	0	42	
7	Toronto FC	34	11	15	8	44	54	−10	41	
8	Houston Dynamo	34	11	17	6	39	58	−19	39	
9	Chicago Fire	34	6	10	18	41	51	−10	36	
10	Montreal Impact	34	6	18	10	38	58	−20	28	

Source: MLS

==== Regular season ====
Kickoff times are in CDT (UTC-05) unless shown otherwise

March 8, 2014 1	Seattle Sounders FC	1–0	Sporting Kansas City	Seattle, Washington
14:00 CST (UTC-06)	Cooper (yellow card) 34'; Alonso (yellow card) 44'; Barrett 90+4'	Report	Collin (yellow card) 16'; Feilhaber (yellow card) 46'; Sapong (yellow card) 83'	Stadium: CenturyLink Field; Attendance: 39,240; Referee: Alan Kelly

March 15, 2014 2	Sporting Kansas City	1–1	FC Dallas	Kansas City, Kansas
19:30	Collin 81'	Report	Moffat (yellow card) 28'; Keel (yellow card) 30'; Watson (yellow card) 88'; Hedges 90'	Stadium: Sporting Park; Attendance: 19,431; Referee: Abbey Okulaja

March 22, 2014 3	Sporting Kansas City	1–0	San Jose Earthquakes	Kansas City, Kansas
19:30	Sinovic (yellow card) 42'; Dwyer 57' (pen.); Nagamura (yellow card) 81'; Kronberg (yellow card) 83'	Report	Bernárdez (yellow card) 9'; Lenhart (yellow card) 39'; Goodson (yellow card) 57'; Francis (yellow card) 66'	Stadium: Sporting Park; Attendance: 19,368; Referee: Ricardo Salazar

March 29, 2014 4	Colorado Rapids	2–3	Sporting Kansas City	Commerce City, Colorado
17:00	Wynne (yellow card) 43' (yellow-red card) 85'; Sánchez 60' (pen.), 78' (pen.); LaBrocca (yellow card) 89'; Sturgis (yellow card) 90+3'	Report	Kronberg (yellow card) 29'; Zusi 50'; Nagamura (yellow card) 72'; Feilhaber 79'; Dwyer 90+2'	Stadium: Dick's Sporting Goods Park; Attendance: 12,203; Referee: Jose Carlos Rivero

April 5, 2014 5	Sporting Kansas City	0–0	Real Salt Lake	Kansas City, Kansas
19:30	Myers (yellow card) 76'; Uri (red card) 83'; Bieler (yellow card) 90+1'	Report	Schuler (yellow card) 39'; Borchers (yellow card) 87'	Stadium: Sporting Park; Attendance: 19,838; Referee: Armando Villarreal

April 19, 2014 6	Sporting Kansas City	4–0	Montreal Impact	Kansas City, Kansas
19:30	Mallace 31' (o.g.); Collin 71'; Dwyer 74', 86'; Peterson (yellow card) 89'	Report	Mapp (yellow card) 38'; Ferrari (yellow card) 52'; Ouimette (yellow card) 73'; Mallace (yellow card) 80'	Stadium: Sporting Park; Attendance: 20,306; Referee: Hilario Grajeda

April 26, 2014 7	New England Revolution	2–0	Sporting Kansas City	Foxborough, Massachusetts
18:30	Nguyen (yellow card) 47' (goal) 90+5' (pen.); Dorman (yellow card) 74'; Bunbury 90+2'	Report	Toni (yellow card) 41'; Collin (red card) 74'; Dwyer (yellow card) 88'	Stadium: Gillette Stadium; Attendance: 14,806; Referee: Alan Kelly

May 4, 2014 8	Sporting Kansas City	2–0	Columbus Crew	Kansas City, Kansas
15:00	Peterson 10'; Olum (yellow card) 38'; Sinovic (yellow card) 68'; Feilhaber (yellow card) 92'; Bieler 95'	Report	Trapp (yellow card) 45' (yellow-red card) 80'; Finlay (yellow card) 86'; Tchani (yellow card) 87'	Stadium: Sporting Park; Attendance: 20,565; Referee: Ismail Elfath

May 10, 2014 9	Montreal Impact	0–3	Sporting Kansas City	Montreal, Quebec
15:00	Warner (red card) 17'; Bernardello (yellow card) 38'	Report	Dwyer 18' (pen.), 64'; Nagamura 34'	Stadium: Stade Saputo; Attendance: 16,529; Referee: Jair Marrufo

May 14, 2014 10	Sporting Kansas City	1–2	Philadelphia Union	Kansas City, Kansas
19:30	Dwyer 80'; Besler (yellow card) 86'	Report	Cruz 51'; Fabinho (yellow card) 58'; Nogueira (yellow card) 70'; Maidana 81'; Bone (red card) 90'; MacMath (yellow card) 94+'	Stadium: Sporting Park; Attendance: 19,073; Referee: Ricardo Salazar

May 18, 2014 11	Chicago Fire	2–1	Sporting Kansas City	Bridgeview, Illinois
14:00	Magee 7' (pen.), 15' (pen.) (yellow card) 91'; Hurtado (yellow card) 96'	Report	Palmer-Brown (yellow card) 49' (yellow-red card) 64'; Dwyer 68'; Ellis (yellow card) 94'	Stadium: Toyota Park; Attendance: 15,746; Referee: Jose Carlos Rivera

May 23, 2014 12	Sporting Kansas City	2–2	Toronto FC	Kansas City, Kansas
19:30	Dwyer 47', 84' (pen.); Nagamura (yellow card) 79'		Gilberto (yellow card) 39'; Bloom (yellow card) 57'; Caldwell (red card) 63'; Moore 67' (yellow card) 83'; Orr 91'	Stadium: Sporting Park; Attendance: 19,914; Referee: Baldomero Toledo

May 27, 2014 13	Sporting Kansas City	1–1	New York Red Bulls	Kansas City, Kansas
20:00	Toni 9' (yellow card) 87'; Ellis (yellow card) 63'	Report	Wright-Phillips (yellow card) 14' (goal) 50'; McCarty (yellow card) 20'	Stadium: Sporting Park; Attendance: 19,221; Referee: Chris Penso

May 31, 2014 14	D.C. United	1–0	Sporting Kansas City	Washington D.C.
18:00	Espindola 28' (yellow card) 76'; Christian (yellow card) 62'; Kitchen (yellow card) 82'; Caskey (red card) 94+'	Report	Palmer-Brown (yellow card) 72'; Toni (yellow card) 85'	Stadium: RFK Stadium; Attendance: 18,522; Referee: Jorge Gonzalez

June 6, 2014 15	Houston Dynamo	0–2	Sporting Kansas City	Houston, Texas
19:30	López (yellow card) 21'; Driver (yellow card) 29'; Brunner (yellow card) 47'; Taylor (yellow card) 79'	Report	Toni (red card) 21'; Saad 45' (yellow card) 87'; Dwyer 70' (pen.); Kronberg (yellow card) 90+4'	Stadium: BBVA Compass Stadium; Attendance: 18,396; Referee: Juan Guzman

June 27, 2014 16	Portland Timbers	0–1	Sporting Kansas City	Portland, Oregon
22:00	Johnson (yellow card) 95'	Report	Olum 24'; Sinovic (yellow card) 36'; Ellis (yellow card) 65'; Nagamura (yellow card) 94'; Dwyer (yellow card) 96'	Stadium: Providence Park; Attendance: 20,814; Referee: Armando Villarreal

July 6, 2014 17	Sporting Kansas City	1–1	Chicago Fire	Kansas City, Kansas
14:00	Dwyer 33' (yellow card) 34'; Feilhaber (yellow card) 86'	Report	Magee 40'; Ritter (yellow card) 45'; Duka (yellow card) 54'	Stadium: Sporting Park; Attendance: 20,858; Referee: Alan Kelly

July 12, 2014 18	Montreal Impact	1–2	Sporting Kansas City	Montreal, Quebec
18:30	Di Vaio 28' (yellow card) 92'; Felipe (yellow card) 31'; Romero (yellow card) 41'; Król (yellow card) 64'	Report	Dwyer 4' 89'; Sinovic (yellow card) 32'	Stadium: Stade Saputo; Attendance: 17,155; Referee: Hilario Grajeda

July 16, 2014 19	Columbus Crew	1–2	Sporting Kansas City	Columbus, Ohio
18:30	Trapp (yellow card) 53' (yellow-red card) 89'	Report	Olum (yellow card) 34'; Sapong 42'; Collin (red card) 55'; Julião 69' (o.g.) (yellow card) 79'; Feilhaber 93'	Stadium: Crew Stadium; Attendance: 13,643; Referee: Edvin Jurisevic

July 19, 2014 20	Sporting Kansas City	2–1	Los Angeles Galaxy	Kansas City, Kansas
18:00	Feilhaber 10'; Olum 61' (yellow card) 66'; Peterson (yellow card) 93'	Report	Keane 79' (yellow card) 88'	Stadium: Sporting Park; Attendance: 21,493; Referee: Chris Penso

July 26, 2014 21	Toronto FC	1–2	Sporting Kansas City	Toronto, Ontario
18:00	Jackson 16' (yellow card) 33'; Morrow (yellow card) 35'; Oduro (yellow card) 44'; Henry (yellow card) 45+2'; Bradley (yellow card) 73'	Report	Zusi 48'; Besler (yellow card) 53' (yellow-red card); Julião (yellow card) 69'; Peterson 80'	Stadium: BMO Field; Attendance: 22,591; Referee: Ted Unkel

August 1, 2014 22	Sporting Kansas City	1–1	Philadelphia Union	Kansas City, Kansas
19:00	Zusi 54'	Report	Brown 71'	Stadium: Sporting Park; Attendance: 21,318; Referee: Jair Marrufo

August 10, 2014 23	Vancouver Whitecaps FC	2–0	Sporting Kansas City	Vancouver, British Columbia
19:00	Igor Julião 17' (o.g.); Mattocks 39'; Hurtado (yellow card) 63'; Harvey (yellow card) 84'	Report	Dwyer (yellow card) 25'; Feilhaber (yellow card) 62'	Stadium: BC Place; Attendance: 20,183; Referee: Dave Gantar

August 16, 2014 24	Sporting Kansas City	4–1	Toronto FC	Kansas City, Kansas
19:30	Dwyer 18' (pen.), 33' (pen.); Saad 64'; Sapong 77'	Report	Gilberto 45+1'	Stadium: Sporting Park; Attendance: 20,730; Referee: Drew Fischer

August 23, 2014 25	Sporting Kansas City	0–3	D.C. United	Kansas City, Kansas
19:30	Julião (yellow card) 83'	Report	Espindola 24'; Rolfe 28'; Kitchen 31'; Kemp (yellow card) 61'	Stadium: Sporting Park; Attendance: 19,963; Referee: Alan Kelly

August 29, 2014 26	Sporting Kansas City	1–3	Houston Dynamo	Kansas City, Kansas
19:00	Dwyer (yellow card) 40' (goal) 54'; Feilhaber (yellow card) 44'	Report	Bruin 35'; Sarkodie (yellow card) 44'; Clark (yellow card) 50' (goal) 67'; Horst 62'; García (yellow card) 96'	Stadium: Sporting Park; Attendance: 20,332; Referee: Mark Geiger

September 3, 2014 27	New England Revolution	3–1	Sporting Kansas City	Foxborough, Massachusetts
18:30	Kobayashi (yellow card) 22'; Bunbury (yellow card) 29' (goal) 45'; Nguyen 48', 94'; Rowe (yellow card) 84'	Report	Saad 9'; Lopez (yellow card) 35'; Sinovic (yellow card) 39'; Zusi (yellow card) 84'	Stadium: Gillette Stadium; Attendance: 11,707; Referee: Ismail Elfath

September 6, 2014 28	New York Red Bulls	2–1	Sporting Kansas City	Harrison, New Jersey
18:00	Wright-Phillips 11' (pen.); Sekagya (yellow card) 45+4'; Henry 52'	Report	Dwyer 54'; Julião (yellow card) 57'; Zusi (yellow card) 62'; Olum (yellow card) 68'	Stadium: Red Bull Arena; Attendance: 20,831; Referee: Hilario Grajeda

September 13, 2014 29	Chivas USA	0–4	Sporting Kansas City	Los Angeles, California
21:30	Chavez (yellow card) 12'	Report	Dwyer 40'; Feilhaber 45+2'; Zusi 52'; Olum (yellow card) 67'; Lopez (yellow card) 67'; Bieler 87'	Stadium: StubHub Center; Attendance: 3,933; Referee: Juan Guzman

September 26, 2014 30	Sporting Kansas City	2–3	New England Revolution	Kansas City, Kansas
19:00	Claros (yellow card) 39'; Nagamura 54'; Dwyer 56'; Zusi (yellow card) 60'; Besler (yellow card) 90'	Report	Kobayashi (yellow card) 8'; Rowe 22'; Goncalves 35' (yellow card) 89'; Jones 85'; Davies (yellow card) 94'	Stadium: Sporting Park; Attendance: 19,522; Referee: Baldomero Toledo

October 5, 2014 31	D.C. United	0–0	Sporting Kansas City	Washington D.C.
19:00	Arnaud (yellow card) 45+1'	Report	Sinovic (yellow card) 30'; Nagamura (yellow card) 52'; Dwyer (yellow card) 55'	Stadium: RFK Stadium; Attendance: 19,308; Referee: Hilario Grajeda

October 10, 2014 32	Sporting Kansas City	2–0	Chicago Fire	Kansas City, Kansas
19:30	Besler (yellow card) 71'; Zusi 80'; Dwyer 92'	Report	Watson (yellow card) 4'; Soumare (yellow card) 60'; Amarikwa (yellow card) 88'	Stadium: Sporting Park; Attendance: 18,938; Referee: Kevin Stott

October 18, 2014 33	Philadelphia Union	2–1	Sporting Kansas City	Chester, Pennsylvania
19:00	Brown 45'; Ribeiro 71'; Valdes (yellow card) 90'	Report	Collin (yellow card) 26'; Dwyer 54' (pen.); Olum (yellow card) 84'	Stadium: PPL Park; Attendance: 18,073; Referee: Jair Marrufo

October 26, 2014 34	Sporting Kansas City	0–2	New York Red Bulls	Kansas City, Kansas
19:30		Report	Wright-Phillips 15', 70'	Stadium: Sporting Park; Attendance: 19,188; Referee: Armando Villarreal

==== MLS Cup Playoffs ====
===== Bracket =====
Knockout round
E4	New York Red Bulls	2
E5	Sporting Kansas City	1
W4	FC Dallas	2
W5	Vancouver Whitecaps FC	1

Conference semifinals
E1	D.C. United	0	2	2
E4	New York Red Bulls	2	1	3
Eastern Conference
E2	New England Revolution	4	3	7
E3	Columbus Crew	2	1	3
W1	Seattle Sounders FC (a)	1	0	1
W4	FC Dallas	1	0	1
Western Conference
W2	LA Galaxy	0	5	5
W3	Real Salt Lake	0	0	0

Conference finals
E4	New York Red Bulls	1	2	3
E2	New England Revolution	2	2	4
W1	Seattle Sounders FC	0	2	2
W2	LA Galaxy (a)	1	1	2

MLS Cup
E2	New England Revolution	1
W2	LA Galaxy (a.e.t.)	2

===== Results =====
October 30, 2014 Knockout Round	New York Red Bulls	2–1	Sporting Kansas City	Harrison, New Jersey
20:00 EDT	Wright-Phillips 77', 90'	Report	Dwyer 53'	Stadium: Red Bull Arena; Attendance: 15,518; Referee: Armando Villarreal

=== CONCACAF Champions League ===
==== CONCACAF Champions League (2013–14) ====
Advanced from Group stage

==== Championship Stage ====
In the championship stage, the eight teams play a single-elimination tournament. Each tie is played on a home-and-away two-legged basis. The away goals rule is used if the aggregate score is level after normal time of the second leg, but not after extra time, and so a tie is decided by penalty shoot-out if the aggregate score is level after extra time of the second leg.

===== Bracket =====
Quarterfinals
6	(United States) LA Galaxy	1	2	3
3	(Mexico) Tijuana	0	4	4
7	(United States) Sporting Kansas City	1	1	2
2	(Mexico) Cruz Azul	0	5	5
5	(Costa Rica) Alajuelense	0	2	2
4	(Panama) Árabe Unido	0	0	0
8	(United States) San Jose Earthquakes	1	1	2 (4)
1	(Mexico) Toluca (p)	1	1	2 (5)

Semifinals
3	(Mexico) Tijuana	1	0	1
2	(Mexico) Cruz Azul	0	2	2
5	(Costa Rica) Alajuelense	0	0	0
1	(Mexico) Toluca	1	2	3

Finals
2	(Mexico) Cruz Azul (a)	0	1	1
1	(Mexico) Toluca	0	1	1

===== Quarterfinals =====
Team 1	Agg.	Team 2	1st leg	2nd leg
Sporting Kansas City (United States)	5–2	(Mexico) Cruz Azul	1–0	1–5

March 12, 2014 1st Leg	Sporting Kansas City (United States)	1–0	(Mexico) Cruz Azul	Sporting Park, Kansas City
19:00	Ellis 17'	Report		Attendance: 18,467; Referee: (El Salvador) Elmer Bonilla

March 19, 2014 2nd Leg	Cruz Azul (Mexico)	5–1	(United States) Sporting Kansas City	Estadio Azul, Mexico City
21:00	Pavone 2', 24', 55'; Formica 66'; Giménez 70'	Report	Feilhaber 44'	Referee: (Guatemala) Walter López

Cruz Azul won 5–2 on aggregate.

==== CONCACAF Champions League (2014–15) ====
===== Group stage =====
Pos	Team	Pld	W	D	L	GF	GA	GD	Pts	Qualification
1	(Costa Rica) Saprissa	4	2	1	1	7	4	+3	7 (Note: Saprissa finished ahead of Sporting Kansas City based on head-to-head away goals scored (1–0).)	Advance to championship stage
2	(United States) Sporting Kansas City	4	2	1	1	7	4	+3	7	
3	(Nicaragua) Real Estelí	4	0	2	2	2	8	−6	2	

Source: CONCACAF
Rules for classification: Group stage tiebreakers
Notes:

August 19, 2014 Group Match 1	Real Estelí (Nicaragua)	1–1	(United States) Sporting Kansas City	Estadio Independencia, Estelí
21:00 CDT	Claros 6' (o.g.); Daniel (yellow card) 21'	Report; Box Score	Toni 21'; Collin (yellow card) 32'; Zusi (yellow card) 53'	Referee: Enrico Wijngaarde (Suriname)

September 18, 2014 Group Match 2	Sporting Kansas City (United States)	3–1	(Costa Rica) Saprissa	Sporting Park, Kansas City
19:00 CDT	Dwyer 13' (pen.); Sinovic (yellow card) 40'; Dovale 69', 76'	Report	Alvarez (yellow card) 13'; Bustos 28'; Morales (yellow card) 30'; Smith (yellow card) 50'; Badilla (yellow card) 79'	Attendance: 16,834; Referee: Fernando Guerrero (Mexico)

September 23, 2014 Group Match 3	Sporting Kansas City (United States)	3–0	(Nicaragua) Real Estelí	Sporting Park, Kansas City
19:00 CDT	Palmer-Brown (yellow card) 12'; Nagamura (yellow card) 13'; Bieler 13', 70'; Julião (yellow card) 18'; Besler (yellow card) 54'; Zusi (yellow card) 64'; Zizzo 79'	Report	Valinente (yellow card) 13'; Rodriguez (yellow card) 42'; Kardek (yellow card) 48'	Attendance: 17,154; Referee: Óscar Moncada (Honduras)

October 23, 2014 Group Match 4	Saprissa (Costa Rica)	2–0	(United States) Sporting Kansas City	Estadio Ricardo Saprissa Aymá, San José
21:00 CDT	Machado (yellow card) 20'; Mora 22'; Rodriguez 46'; Guzman (yellow card) 74'; Grant (yellow card) 78'	Report	Collin (yellow card) 35'; Ellis (yellow card) 89'	Attendance: 16,175

=== U.S. Open Cup ===
Bracket

Fourth Round; June 11–18
NASL	Carolina RailHawks	1(3)
MLS	Chivas USA	1(2)
USLP	Arizona United SC	1
MLS	LA Galaxy	2
MLS	Houston Dynamo	1
PDL	Laredo Heat	0
MLS	FC Dallas	2
NASL	San Antonio Scorpions	0
MLS	Philadelphia Union (aet)	3
USLP	Harrisburg City Islanders	1
NASL	New York Cosmos	3
MLS	New York Red Bulls	0
USLP	Richmond Kickers	2
MLS	New England Revolution	3
USLP	Rochester Rhinos	1
MLS	D.C. United	0
MLS	Seattle Sounders FC	5
USASA	PSA Elite	0
MLS	San Jose Earthquakes	2
USLP	Sacramento Republic	1
MLS	Sporting Kansas City	2
NASL	Minnesota United FC	0
MLS	Portland Timbers	3
PDL	Orlando City U-23	0
MLS	Colorado Rapids	5
USLP	Orlando City	2
NASL	Atlanta Silverbacks	2
MLS	Real Salt Lake	1
MLS	Chicago Fire	2
USLP	Pittsburgh Riverhounds	1
MLS	Columbus Crew (aet)	2
NASL	Indy Eleven	1

Fifth Round; June 24–25
NASL	Carolina RailHawks (aet)	1
MLS	LA Galaxy	0
MLS	Houston Dynamo	2
MLS	FC Dallas	3
MLS	Philadelphia Union (aet)	2
NASL	New York Cosmos	1
MLS	New England Revolution	2
USLP	Rochester Rhinos	1
MLS	Seattle Sounders FC	1(4)
MLS	San Jose Earthquakes	1(1)
MLS	Sporting Kansas City	1
MLS	Portland Timbers	3
MLS	Colorado Rapids	1
NASL	Atlanta Silverbacks	2
MLS	Chicago Fire (aet)	4
MLS	Columbus Crew	2

Quarterfinals; July 8–9
NASL	Carolina RailHawks	2
MLS	FC Dallas	5
MLS	Philadelphia Union	2
MLS	New England Revolution	0
MLS	Seattle Sounders FC (aet)	3
MLS	Portland Timbers	1
NASL	Atlanta Silverbacks	1
MLS	Chicago Fire	3

Semifinals; Aug 12–13
MLS	FC Dallas	1(3)
MLS	Philadelphia Union	1(4)
MLS	Seattle Sounders FC	6
MLS	Chicago Fire	0

Final; Sep 16
MLS	Philadelphia Union	1
MLS	Seattle Sounders FC (aet)	3

- Host team listed first
- Bold winner

June 18, 2014 Fourth round	Sporting Kansas City	2–0	Minnesota United FC	Kansas City, Kansas
19:30 CDT	Saad 76'; Dwyer (yellow card) 82'; Martinez 87'	Report; Box Score	Jordan (yellow card) 29'; Cristiano (red card) 50'	Stadium: Sporting Park; Attendance: 15,307

June 24, 2014 Fifth round	Sporting Kansas City	1–3	(Oregon) Portland Timbers	Kansas City, Kansas
19:30 CDT	Collin (yellow card) 53'; Saad 73' (pen.)	Report	Fernadez 30', 68'; Johnson 57' (pen.); Alhassan (yellow card) 85'	Stadium: Sporting Park; Attendance: 11,138

=== Friendlies ===
July 23, 2014 Summer in the Soccer Capital	Sporting Kansas City	1–4	Manchester City	Kansas City, Kansas
20:00	Sapong 30'; Sinovic (yellow card) 44'; Claros (yellow card) 68'; Zizzo (yellow card) 93'	Report	Zuculini 2'; Boyata 45'; Kolarov 72' (pen.); Ihenacho 88'	Stadium: Sporting Park; Attendance: 18,484
