= 2013 Sporting Kansas City season =

Sporting Kansas City
2013 season
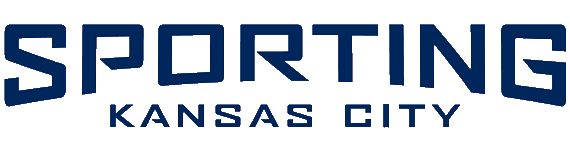
- Owner: Sporting Club
- Head coach: Peter Vermes
- Stadium: Sporting Park
- MLS: East: 2nd Overall: 2nd
- MLS Cup: Winner
- U.S. Open Cup: Fourth round
- CONCACAF Champions League: Advanced to Championship Stage
- Top goalscorer: League: Claudio Bieler (10); All: Claudio Bieler (12)
- Highest home attendance: 21,650 v Real Salt Lake (December 7, 2013)
- Lowest home attendance: MLS: 18,602 v Seattle Sounders FC (May 8, 2013); All: 15,321 v Des Moines Menace (May 28, 2013)
- Average home league attendance: MLS:19,869; All Competitions:19,219
Home colors	Away colors	Third colors

The 2013 Sporting Kansas City season was the eighteenth season of the team's existence in Major League Soccer and the third year played under the Sporting Kansas City moniker.

Sporting Kansas City entered the season as the defending U.S. Open Cup champions and as back-to-back Eastern Conference Regular Season Champions. By winning the 2012 U.S. Open Cup, they were qualified for the 2013–14 CONCACAF Champions League for the first time in franchise history.

Ivy Funds became the club's kit sponsor, a first for the franchise.

Sporting Kansas City qualified for the MLS Cup Playoffs for the 12th time in the team's 18-year history and third straight season, moving into a three-way tie for fourth most MLS Cup Playoff appearances with the Chicago Fire and FC Dallas, trailing only the Colorado Rapids (13), New York Red Bulls (14), and Los Angeles Galaxy (15). The team defeated New England Revolution, Houston Dynamo and Real Salt Lake to win the 2013 MLS Cup.

== Squad ==
=== First team roster ===
No.	Position	Nation	Player
1	GK	DEN	Jimmy Nielsen (Captain)
2	DF	USA	Erik Palmer-Brown (HGP)
3	DF	USA	Ike Opara
4	DF	USA	Kevin Ellis (HGP)
5	DF	USA	Matt Besler (XI)
6	MF	BRA	Paulo Nagamura
7	DF	USA	Chance Myers
8	MF	USA	Graham Zusi (XI)
9	FW	USA	Teal Bunbury
10	MF	USA	Benny Feilhaber
12	MF	USA	Mikey Lopez (GA)
13	DF	KEN	Lawrence Olum
14	FW	ENG	Dom Dwyer
15	DF	USA	Seth Sinovic
16	FW	ARG	Claudio Bieler (DP)
17	FW	USA	C. J. Sapong
18	GK	USA	Eric Kronberg
19	MF	HAI	Peterson Joseph
20	MF	ESP	Oriol Rosell
21	GK	USA	Jon Kempin (HGP)
22	FW	LBN	Soony Saad
23	DF	ARG	Federico Bessone
24	DF	HAI	Mechack Jérôme
25	MF	USA	Christian Duke
27	DF	USA	Kyle Miller
31	DF	USA	Josh Gardner
33	DF	USA	Brendan Ruiz
37	MF	USA	Jacob Peterson
78	DF	FRA	Aurélien Collin
94	MF	COL	Jimmy Medranda

== Player movement ==
=== In ===
Date	Player	Position	Previous club	Fee/notes	Ref
December 5, 2012	(United States) Josh Gardner	MF	(United States) Montreal Impact	Trade for 2nd Round Pick in 2013 MLS SuperDraft	
December 11, 2012	(United States) Benny Feilhaber	MF	(United States) New England Revolution	Trade for allocation money, 1st Round Pick in 2014 MLS SuperDraft and 2nd Round Pick in 2015 MLS SuperDraft	
December 12, 2012	(United States) Ike Opara	DF	(United States) San Jose Earthquakes	Trade for 2nd Round Pick in 2013 MLS SuperDraft	
December 13, 2012	(Cameroon) Yann Songo'o	DF	(Spain) Pobla de Mafumet CF	Free transfer	
December 18, 2012	(Argentina) Claudio Bieler	FW	(Ecuador) LDU Quito	Transfer (undisclosed fee)	
January 17, 2013	(United States) Mikey Lopez	MF	(United States) University of North Carolina	2013 MLS SuperDraft	
February 28, 2013	(Haiti) Mechack Jérôme	DF	(United States) Orlando City	Transfer (undisclosed fee)	
February 28, 2013	(United States) Christian Duke	DF	(United States) University of San Diego	2013 MLS Supplemental Draft	
August 2, 2013	(United States) Erik Palmer-Brown	DF	(United States) Sporting Kansas City Academy	Home grown player	
August 9, 2013	(United States) Brendan Ruiz	DF	(Brazil) Figuerense	Transfer (undisclosed fee)	
September 13, 2013	(Argentina) Federico Bessone	DF	(England) Oldham Athletic A.F.C.	Transfer (undisclosed fee)	

=== Out ===
Pos.	Player	New club	Fee/notes	Date	Ref
MF	(Brazil) Júlio César	(Canada) Toronto FC	Option declined	November 19, 2012	
DF	(Cameroon) Cyprian Hedrick	(United States) Phoenix FC	Option declined	November 19, 2012	
DF	(Serbia) Neven Marković	(Switzerland) Servette FC	Option declined	November 19, 2012	
DF/MF	(Poland) Konrad Warzycha	(United States) Columbus Crew	Option declined	November 19, 2012	
DF	(England) Korede Aiyegbusi	(Finland) FC Haka	Option declined	December 3, 2012	
DF	(United States) Michael Harrington	(United States) Portland Timbers	Trade for Allocation money	December 3, 2012	
MF	(Honduras) Roger Espinoza	(England) Wigan Athletic	Free	January 4, 2013	
FW	(United States) Bobby Convey	(Canada) Toronto F.C.	Trade for 2014 MLS SuperDraft Third Round Pick	May 16, 2013	
DF	(Cameroon) Yann Songo'o	(England) Blackburn Rovers	Released	June 28, 2013	
MF	(United States) Michael Thomas	(Canada) Toronto F.C.	Trade for 2015 MLS SuperDraft Second Round Pick	July 2, 2013	
FW	(Sierra Leone) Kei Kamara	(England) Middlesbrough F.C.	Transfer for $2.1 million	September 2, 2013	

=== Loans ===
==== In ====
No.	Pos.	Player	Loaned From	Start	End	Source
94	MF	(Colombia) Jimmy Medranda	(Colombia) Deportivo Pereira	August 9, 2013	February 13, 2014	

==== Out ====
No.	Pos.	Player	Loaned To	Start	End	Source
23	FW	(Sierra Leone) Kei Kamara	(England) Norwich City	January 30, 2013	May 6, 2013	
14	FW	(England) Dom Dwyer	(United States) Orlando City	March 14, 2013	June 27, 2013	
2	DF	(Cameroon) Yann Songo'o	(United States) Orlando City	March 14, 2013	June 28, 2013	
21	GK	(United States) Jon Kempin	(United States) Orlando City	March 14, 2013	September 8, 2013	
25	MF	(United States) Christian Duke	(United States) Orlando City	March 14, 2013	September 8, 2013	
17	FW	(United States) C. J. Sapong	(United States) Orlando City	July 11, 2013	July 18, 2013	
4	DF	(United States) Kevin Ellis	(United States) Orlando City	July 11, 2013	September 8, 2013	
17	FW	(United States) C. J. Sapong	(United States) Orlando City	August 2, 2013	August 5, 2013	
14	FW	(England) Dom Dwyer	(United States) Orlando City	September 4, 2013	September 8, 2013	

== Competitions ==
=== Match results ===
Win Tie Loss

=== Preseason ===
==== Desert Friendlies ====
January 29, 2013	Sporting Kansas City	1–1	FC Tucson	Tucson, Arizona
19:00 UTC-6	Saad 9'	Recap	Wallen 11'	Stadium: Kino Sports Complex

February 1, 2013	Sporting Kansas City	1–0	Portland Timbers	Tucson, Arizona
19:00 UTC-6	Opara (yellow card) 36'; Jérôme 64'; Olum (yellow card) 74'; Joseph (yellow card) 88' (red card) 90+'	Recap	Chara (yellow card) 14'; Kawulok (yellow card) 85'	Stadium: Kino Sports Complex

==== 2013 Disney Pro Soccer Classic ====
February 9, 2013	Montreal Impact	2–1	Sporting Kansas City	Lake Buena Vista, Florida
14:00 UTC-6	Arnaud (yellow card) 31'; Di Vaio 45'; Wenger 61'; Lefevre (yellow card) 90'	Recap	Zusi 18'	Stadium: ESPN Wide World of Sports Complex

February 13, 2013	Sporting Kansas City	2–0	D.C. United	Lake Buena Vista, Florida
17:00 UTC-6	Rosell (yellow card) 67'; Convey 74'; Saad 81'	Recao		Stadium: ESPN Wide World of Sports Complex

February 16, 2013	Tampa Bay Rowdies	0–1	Sporting Kansas City	Lake Buena Vista, Florida
19:00 UTC-6	Mulholland (yellow card) 27'; Hill (yellow card) 82'	Recap	Zusi 78'	Stadium: ESPN Wide World of Sports Complex

February 23, 2013	Toronto FC	0–1	Sporting Kansas City	Lake Buena Vista, Florida
12:00 UTC-6	O'Dea (yellow card) 15' (red card) 57'; Davis (yellow card) 35'	Recap	Bieler 23'; Rosell (yellow card) 48'	Stadium: ESPN Wide World of Sports Complex

=== Major League Soccer ===
==== League table ====
Pos	Team	Pld	W	L	T	GF	GA	GD	Pts	Qualification
1	New York Red Bulls (S)	34	17	9	8	58	41	+17	59	CONCACAF Champions League
2	Sporting Kansas City (C)	34	17	10	7	47	30	+17	58	CONCACAF Champions League
3	Portland Timbers	34	14	5	15	54	33	+21	57	CONCACAF Champions League
4	Real Salt Lake	34	16	10	8	57	41	+16	56	
5	LA Galaxy	34	15	11	8	53	38	+15	53	
6	Seattle Sounders FC	34	15	12	7	42	42	0	52	
7	New England Revolution	34	14	11	9	49	38	+11	51	
8	Colorado Rapids	34	14	11	9	45	38	+7	51	
9	Houston Dynamo	34	14	11	9	41	41	0	51	
10	San Jose Earthquakes	34	14	11	9	35	42	−7	51	
11	Montreal Impact	34	14	13	7	50	49	+1	49	CONCACAF Champions League
12	Chicago Fire	34	14	13	7	47	52	−5	49	
13	Vancouver Whitecaps FC	34	13	12	9	53	45	+8	48	
14	Philadelphia Union	34	12	12	10	42	44	−2	46	
15	FC Dallas	34	11	12	11	48	52	−4	44	
16	Columbus Crew	34	12	17	5	42	46	−4	41	
17	Toronto FC	34	6	17	11	30	47	−17	29	
18	Chivas USA	34	6	20	8	30	67	−37	26	
19	D.C. United	34	3	24	7	22	59	−37	16	CONCACAF Champions League

Source: MLS
Rules for classification: 1) points; 2) head-to-head record; 3) goal difference; 4) number of goals scored
(C) MLS Cup Champion; (S) Supporters' Shield

==== Eastern Conference standings ====
Pos	Team	Pld	W	L	T	GF	GA	GD	Pts	Qualification
1	New York Red Bulls	34	17	9	8	58	41	+17	59	MLS Cup Conference Semifinals
2	Sporting Kansas City	34	17	10	7	47	30	+17	58	MLS Cup Conference Semifinals
3	New England Revolution	34	14	11	9	49	38	+11	51	MLS Cup Conference Semifinals
4	Houston Dynamo	34	14	11	9	41	41	0	51	MLS Cup Knockout Round
5	Montreal Impact	34	14	13	7	50	49	+1	49	MLS Cup Knockout Round
6	Chicago Fire	34	14	13	7	47	52	−5	49	
7	Philadelphia Union	34	12	12	10	42	44	−2	46	
8	Columbus Crew	34	12	17	5	42	46	−4	41	
9	Toronto FC	34	6	17	11	30	47	−17	29	
10	D.C. United	34	3	24	7	22	59	−37	16	

Source: MLS

==== Regular season ====
Kickoff times are in CDT (UTC-05) unless shown otherwise

March 2, 2013 1	Philadelphia Union	1–3	Sporting Kansas City	Chester, Pennsylvania
15:00	Le Toux 17'; Gaddis (yellow card) 89'	Report	Collin (yellow card) 25'; Zusi 41'; Convey (yellow card) 56'; Rosell 66'; Bieler 83'	Stadium: PPL Park; Attendance: 18,160; Referee: Mark Geiger

March 9, 2013 2	Toronto FC	2–1	Sporting Kansas City	Toronto, Ontario
12:30	Earnshaw 3', 21' (pen.); Califf (yellow card) 77'; Eckersley (yellow card) 86'; O'Dea (yellow card) 90+1'	Report	Nagamura (yellow card) 24'; Collin (yellow card) 39'; Sinovic (yellow card) 75'; Bieler 77'; Feilhaber (yellow card) 78'	Stadium: Rogers Centre; Attendance: 25,991; Referee: Fotis Bazakos

March 16, 2013 3	Sporting Kansas City	0–0	Chicago Fire	Kansas City, Kansas
14:00	Sinovic (yellow card) 47'; Rosell (yellow card) 93'	Report	Paladini (yellow card) 41'; Segares (yellow card) 77'; Santos (yellow card) 84'; Rolfe (yellow card) 91'	Stadium: Sporting Park; Attendance: 19,868; Referee: Silviu Petrescu

March 23, 2013 4	New England Revolution	0–0	Sporting Kansas City	Foxborough, Massachusetts
15:00		Report	Jerome (yellow card) 30'; Feilhaber (yellow card) 71'	Stadium: Gillette Stadium; Attendance: 12,215; Referee: Edvin Jurisevic

March 30, 2013 5	Sporting Kansas City	2–0	Montreal Impact	Kansas City, Kansas
18:30	Bieler 5'; Collin (yellow card) 49'; Sinovic (yellow card) 53'; Zusi 80'	Report	Martins (yellow card) 55'; Schällibaum (red card) 81'	Stadium: Sporting Park; Attendance: 18,609; Referee: Jorge Gonzalez

April 5, 2013 6	Sporting Kansas City	1–0	D.C. United	Kansas City, Kansas
18:30	Rosell (yellow card) 17'; Myers (yellow card) 75'; Bieler 89'	Report	Rafel (yellow card) 31'; Jakovic (yellow card) 48'; Hamid (yellow card) 72'	Stadium: Sporting Park; Attendance: 18,988; Referee: Armando Villarreal

April 17, 2013 7	New York Red Bulls	0–1	Sporting Kansas City	Harrison, New Jersey
18:30	Cahill (yellow card) 45+1'; McCarty (yellow card) 81'; Juninho (red card) 90+1'	Report	Collin 13'; Myers (yellow card) 27'; Rosell (yellow card) 69'; Joseph (yellow card) 87'; Nielsen (yellow card) 90+6'	Stadium: Red Bull Arena; Attendance: 12,338; Referee: Allen Chapman

April 20, 2013 8	Los Angeles Galaxy	2–0	Sporting Kansas City	Carson, California
21:30	Sarvas 27'; Donovan 74'	Report	Joseph (yellow card) 64'	Stadium: The Home Depot Center; Attendance: 25,908; Referee: Jair Marrufo

April 27, 2013 9	Sporting Kansas City	2–3	Portland Timbers	Kansas City, Kansas
19:30	Myers 1', 29'; Rosell (yellow card) 51'	Report	Johnson 24'; Nagbe 33'; Wallace 58' (yellow card) 90+1'; Zemanski (yellow card) 79'	Stadium: Sporting Park; Attendance: 20,186; Referee: David Gantar

May 5, 2013 10	Sporting Kansas City	4–0	Chivas USA	Kansas City, Kansas
16:00	Bieler 41', 57' (pen.); Nagamura (yellow card) 58'; Zusi 65'; Sapong 87'	Report	Velázquez (yellow card) 1'; Morales (yellow card) 25'; Kennedy (red card) 54'; Alvarez (yellow card) 73'	Stadium: Sporting Park; Attendance: 18,811; Referee: Baldomero Toledo

May 8, 2013 11	Sporting Kansas City	0–1	Seattle Sounders F.C.	Kansas City, Kansas
19:30	Opara (yellow card) 45'; Collin (yellow card) 91'	Report	Hahnemann (red card) 24'; Traore 94'	Stadium: Sporting Park; Attendance: 18,602; Referee: Geoff Gamble

May 12, 2013 12	Houston Dynamo	0–1	Sporting Kansas City	Houston, Texas
19:00	Driver (yellow card) 29'; Ashe (yellow card) 71'	Report	Collin (yellow card) 24' (goal) 73'; Rosell (yellow card) 40'	Stadium: BBVA Compass Stadium; Attendance: 19,004; Referee: Chris Penso

May 19, 2013 13	D.C. United	1–1	Sporting Kansas City	Washington, D.C.
19:30	Porter 65'; Kitchen (yellow card) 85'	Report	Olum (yellow card) 54'; White 60' (o.g.)	Stadium: RFK Stadium; Attendance: 13,612; Referee: Jair Marrufo

May 26, 2013 14	Sporting Kansas City	1–1	Houston Dynamo	Kansas City, Kansas
14:30	Sinovic (yellow card) 57'; Kamara 68'	Report	Davis 46+'; Barnes (yellow card) 50'	Stadium: Sporting Park; Attendance: 20,876; Referee: Drew Fischer

June 1, 2013 15	Sporting Kansas City	1–2	Montreal Impact	Kansas City, Kansas
19:30	Jerome (yellow card) 45+1'; Bieler 45+4' (pen.); Opara (yellow card) 52'	Report	Schallibaum (red card) Halftime'; Nyassi 47'; Warner 53'; Mapp (yellow card) 63'; Nesta (red card) 74'; Iapichino (yellow card) 94'	Stadium: Sporting Park; Attendance: 19,470; Referee: Armando Villarreal

June 22, 2013 16	F.C. Dallas	2–2	Sporting Kansas City	Frisco, Texas
19:30	Jacobson 88'; Zimmerman 90'	Report	Kamara 43' (pen.); Watson 57' (o.g.); Sapong (red card) 68'; Nielsen (yellow card) 90+3'	Stadium: FC Dallas Stadium; Attendance: 16,361; Referee: Mark Geiger

June 29, 2013 17	Sporting Kansas City	3–2	Columbus Crew	Kansas City, Kansas
19:30	Kamara 34' 80'; Bieler 50'; Collin (yellow card) 71'	Report	Arrieta 48'; Oduro 53'; Wahl (yellow card) 68'; George (yellow card) 70'	Stadium: Sporting Park; Attendance: 20,128; Referee: Juan Guzman

July 3, 2013 18	Sporting Kansas City	1–1	Vancouver Whitecaps FC	Kansas City, Kansas
20:00	Collin 35' (yellow card) 68'	Report	Camilo 45' (yellow card) 46'	Stadium: Sporting Park; Attendance: 20,137; Referee: Ricardo Salazar

July 7, 2013 19	Chicago Fire	1–2	Sporting Kansas City	Bridgeview, Illinois
14:00	Magee 38'; Segares (yellow card) 57'; Anibaba (yellow card) 62'; Larentowicz (yellow card) 81'; Soumare (yellow card) 85'; Paladini (red card) 93'	Report	Feilhaber 6'; Zusi 8' (yellow card) 55'; Olum (yellow card) 28'	Stadium: Toyota Park; Attendance: 17,735; Referee: Baldomero Toledo

July 13, 2013 20	Sporting Kansas City	3–0	Toronto F.C.	Kansas City, Kansas
19:30	Saad 21' 51'; Besler (yellow card) 48'; Bieler 63' (yellow card) 65'	Report	Brockie (yellow card) 45'; Lambe (red card) 56'	Stadium: Sporting Park; Attendance: 21,126; Referee: Kevin Stott

July 20, 2013 21	Real Salt Lake	1–2	Sporting Kansas City	Sandy, Utah
21:00	Wingert (yellow card) 3' (red card) 66'; Gil (yellow card) 37'; Morales (yellow card) 44'; Findley 56'	Report	Rosell (yellow card) 55'; Saad 67'; Olum (yellow card) 71'; Collin (yellow card) 73'; Opara 90+7'	Stadium: Rio Tinto Stadium; Attendance: 19,832; Referee: Matthew Foerster

July 27, 2013 22	Montreal Impact	1–0	Sporting Kansas City	Montreal, Quebec
18:00	Berniner (yellow card) 71'; Smith 96+'	Report	Sinovic (yellow card) 1'; Joseph (yellow card) 24'; Bieler (yellow card) 70'; Rosell (yellow card) 88'	Stadium: Saputo Stadium; Attendance: 20,527; Referee: Armando Villarreal

August 3, 2013 23	Sporting Kansas City	2–3	New York Red Bulls	Kansas City, Kansas
17:30	Peterson (yellow card) 36'; Kamara 45'; Collin (yellow card) 69'; Dwyer 92+'	Report	Steele 27'; Espindola 63'; Sam 69'; Petke (red card) 99+'	Stadium: Sporting Kansas City; Attendance: 21,304; Referee: Chris Penso

August 10, 2013 24	Sporting Kansas City	3–0	New England Revolution	Kansas City, Kansas
19:30	Kamara 27', 50'; Feilhaber (yellow card) 34' (goal) 92+'; Bieler (yellow card) 81'	Report	Imbongo (yellow card) 53' (yellow-red card) 65'; Dorman (red card) 86'; McCarthy (yellow card) 92+'	Stadium: Sporting Park; Attendance: 19,988; Referee: Baldomero Toledo

August 18, 2013 25	San Jose Earthquakes	1–0	Sporting Kansas City	Santa Clara, California
22:00	Wondolowski 55'	Report	Myers (yellow card) 23'; Collin (yellow card) 32'	Stadium: Buck Shaw Stadium; Attendance: 10,525; Referee: Juan Guzman

August 23, 2013 26	Chicago Fire	1–0	Sporting Kansas City	Bridgeview, Illinois
19:30	Jumper 13' (yellow card) 35'; Alex (yellow card) 20'	Report	Joseph (yellow card) 62'; Besler (yellow card) 88'	Stadium: Toyota Park; Attendance: 17,085; Referee: Mark Geiger

August 31, 2013 27	Sporting Kansas City	2–1	Colorado Rapids	Kansas City, Kansas
19:30	Feilhaber 33'; Rosell (yellow card) 70'; Zusi 88'	Report	Thomas (yellow card) 65'; Buddle 77'; Moor (yellow card) 91'	Stadium: Sporting Park; Attendance: 19,579; Referee: Silviu Petrescu

September 7, 2013 28	Sporting Kansas City	3–0	Columbus Crew	Kansas City, Kansas
19:30	Bieler 7' (pen.) (yellow card) 63'; Saad 41'; Nagamura (yellow card) 45+1'; Sapong 55'	Report	Tchani (yellow card) 52'; O'Rourke (yellow card) 62'	Stadium: Sporting Park; Attendance: 19,211; Referee: Jose Carlos Rivero

September 21, 2013 29	Toronto FC	1–2	Sporting Kansas City	Toronto, Ontario
15:00	Russell (yellow card) 9' (goal) 38'; Hall (yellow card) 11'; Caldwell (red card) 86'; Nelsen (red card) 94'	Report	Collin (yellow card) 17'; Sapong 18', 53'; Joseph (yellow card) 91'	Stadium: BMO Field; Attendance: 12,627; Referee: Allen Chapman

September 27, 2013 30	Sporting Kansas City	0–1	Philadelphia Union	Kansas City, Kansas
19:00	Rosell (yellow card) 34'; Feilhaber (yellow card) 74'; Opara (yellow card) 89'	Report	Casey 36'; Carroll (yellow card) 70'; Williams (yellow card) 82'	Stadium: Sporting Park; Attendance: 19,243; Referee: Ricardo Salazar

October 5, 2013 31	Columbus Crew	0–1	Sporting Kansas City	Columbus, Ohio
18:30		Report	Opara 17'; Sapong (yellow card) 67'; Joseph (yellow card) 85'	Stadium: Columbus Crew Stadium; Attendance: 19,107; Referee: Jorge Gonzalez

October 9, 2013 32	Houston Dynamo	0–0	Sporting Kansas City	Houston, Texas
19:30	Ashe (yellow card) 34'; Sarkodie (yellow card) 92+'	Report	Collin (yellow card) 25'; Olum (yellow card) 38'; Rosell (yellow card) 57'; Bunbury (yellow card) 87'	Stadium: BBVA Compass Stadium; Attendance: 16,433; Referee: Armando Villarreal

October 18, 2013 33	Sporting Kansas City	1–0	D.C. United	Kansas City, Kansas
19:00	Dwyer 7'; Saad (yellow card) 93+'	Report	DeLeon (yellow card) 29'; Jeffrey (yellow card) 30'; Kitchen (yellow card) 39'; Iapichino (yellow card) 87'	Stadium: Sporting Park; Attendance: 18,932; Referee: Chris Penso

October 26, 2013 34	Philadelphia Union	1–2	Sporting Kansas City	Chester, Pennsylvania
14:00	Casey (yellow card) 41'; Farfan (yellow card) 50'; McInerney 88'	Report	Collin (yellow card) 41'; Zusi 48'; Olum 92'	Stadium: PPL Park; Attendance: 18,462; Referee: Baldomero Toledo

==== MLS Cup Playoffs ====
===== Bracket =====
Knockout
E4	Houston	3
E5	Montreal	0
W4	Seattle	2
W5	Colorado	0

Conference semifinals
E1	New York	2	1	3
E4	Houston (a.e.t.)	2	2	4
Eastern Conference
E2	Kansas City (a.e.t.)	1	3	4
E3	New England	2	1	3
W1	Portland	2	3	5
W4	Seattle	1	2	3
Western Conference
W2	Salt Lake (a.e.t.)	0	2	2
W3	Los Angeles	1	0	1

Conference finals
E4	Houston	0	1	1
E2	Kansas City	0	2	2
W1	Portland	2	0	2
W2	Salt Lake	4	1	5

MLS Cup
E2	Kansas City (p)	1 (7)
W2	Salt Lake	1 (6)

===== Results =====
====== Conference Semifinals ======
November 2, 2013 1st Leg	New England Revolution	2–1	Sporting Kansas City	Gillette Stadium, Foxborough
19:00 CDT	Dorman 55'; Rowe 67'; Imbongo (yellow card) 69'; Nguyen (yellow card) 84'; Soares (yellow card) 90'; Barrett (yellow card) 92+'	Report	Sinovic (yellow card) 53'; Collin 69' (yellow card) 76'; Bunbury (yellow card) 71'	Attendance: 15,164; Referee: Ismail Elfath

November 6, 2013 2nd Leg	Sporting Kansas City	3–1 (a.e.t.)	New England Revolution	Sporting Park, Kansas City
20:00 CST	Myers (yellow card) 19'; Collin 41'; Sinovic 79'; Bieler 113'	Report	Barnes (yellow card) 19'; Caldwell (yellow card) 88'; Imbongo 70'	Attendance: 19,031; Referee: Mark Geiger

Sporting Kansas City won 4-3 on aggregate

====== Conference Finals ======
November 9, 2013 1st Leg	Houston Dynamo	0–0	Sporting Kansas City	BBVA Compass Stadium, Houston
13:30 CST		Report		Attendance: 22,107; Referee: Kevin Stott

November 23, 2013 2nd Leg	Sporting Kansas City	2–1	Houston Dynamo	Sporting Park, Kansas City
18:30 CST	Sapong 14'; Dwyer 63'	Report	Garcia 3' (yellow card) 37'; Brunner (yellow card) 85'	Attendance: 21,650; Referee: Baldomero Toledo

Sporting Kansas City won 2–1 on aggregate

==== MLS Cup ====
===== Result =====
December 7, 2013 MLS Cup	Sporting Kansas City	1–1 (a.e.t.) (7-6 p)	Real Salt Lake	Sporting Park, Kansas City, Kansas
3:00 p.m. CST	Collin 76' (yellow card) 35'; Feilhaber (yellow card) 103'	Report	Wingert (yellow card) 24'; Saborío (yellow card) 44' (goal) 52'; Beckerman (yellow card) 100'	Attendance: 21,650; Referee: Hilario Grajeda
	Penalties
	Bieler (penalty scored); Nagamura (penalty scored); Besler (penalty missed); Feilhaber (penalty scored); Zusi (penalty missed); Sinovic (penalty scored); Sapong (penalty scored); Olum (penalty missed); Myers (penalty scored); Collin (penalty scored)		(penalty missed) Saborío; (penalty missed) Grabavoy; (penalty scored) Beckerman; (penalty scored) Plata; (penalty scored) Morales; (penalty scored) Schuler; (penalty scored) Beltran; (penalty missed) Velásquez; (penalty scored) Borchers; (penalty missed) Palmer

=== CONCACAF Champions League (2013–14) ===
Team	Pld	W	D	L	GF	GA	GD	Pts
(United States) Sporting Kansas City	4	2	2	0	5	1	4	8
(Honduras) Olimpia	4	2	1	1	2	2	0	7
(Nicaragua) Real Estelí	4	0	1	3	1	5	-4	1

August 7, 2013 Group stage	Real Estelí (Nicaragua)	0–2	(United States) Sporting Kansas City	Estelí, Nicaragua
22:00 CDT	Lopez (yellow card) 65'	Report	Jérôme (yellow card) 5'; Opara 31'; Saad (yellow card) 45'; Dwyer 76'	Stadium: Estadio Independencia; Referee: Jafeth Perea (Panama)

August 27, 2013 Group stage	Olimpia (Honduras)	0–2	(United States) Sporting Kansas City	Tegucigalpa, Honduras
22:00 CDT	Fonseca (yellow card) 57'; Padilla (yellow card) 74'	Report	Saad 27', 68' (pen.); Nagamura (yellow card) 51'; Sinovic (yellow card) 54'; Collin (yellow card) 74'	Stadium: Estadio Tiburcio Carías Andino; Referee: Henry Bejarano (Costa Rica)

September 17, 2013 Group stage	Sporting Kansas City (United States)	1–1	(Nicaragua) Real Estelí	Kansas City, Kansas
20:00 CDT	Peterson 78'; Gardner (yellow card) 84'	Report	Calero 54'; De Souza (yellow card) 58'; Barrera (yellow card) 94'	Stadium: Sporting Park; Attendance: 18,467; Referee: Sandy Vasquez

October 23, 2013 Group stage	Sporting Kansas City (United States)	0–0	(Honduras) Olimpia	Kansas City, Kansas
20:00 CDT	Collin (yellow card) 25'; Bunbury (yellow card) 40'	report	Mejia (yellow card) 40'; Medina	Stadium: Sporting Park; Attendance: 18,467

Advanced to Championship Stage

=== U.S. Open Cup ===
May 28, 2013 Third round	Sporting Kansas City	2–0	Des Moines Menace	Kansas City, Kansas
7:30 PM CDT	Kamara 12'; Thomas (yellow card) 33'; Bieler 73'	Report	Thaden (yellow card) 40'; Harmon (yellow card) 54'	Stadium: Sporting Park; Attendance: 15,621

June 12, 2013 Fourth round	Sporting Kansas City	0–1	Orlando City	Kansas City, Kansas
7:30 PM CDT		Report	Tan 2'; Pulis (yellow card) 71'	Stadium: Sporting Park; Attendance: 15,981; Referee: Tyler Ploeger
