= Benny Feilhaber =

Soccer coach and former professional player (born 1985)

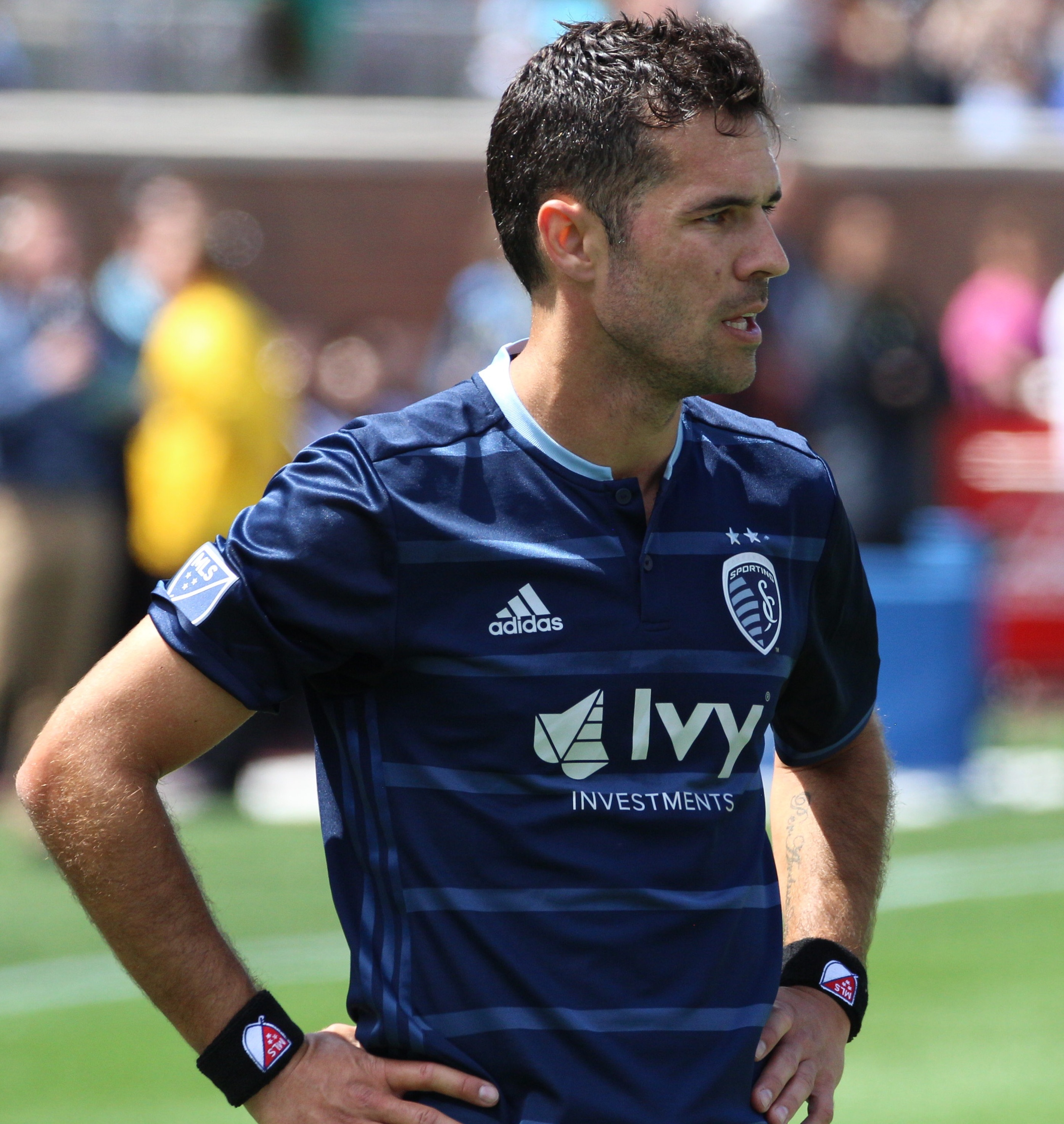
- Feilhaber with Sporting Kansas City in 2017

Personal information
- Full name: Benny Feilhaber
- Date of birth: January 19, 1985 (age 41)
- Place of birth: Rio de Janeiro, Brazil
- Height: 5 ft 9 in (1.75 m)
- Position: Midfielder

Youth career
- 2000–2003: Irvine Strikers

College career
Years	Team	Apps	(Gls)
2003–2004	UCLA Bruins	36	(7)

Senior career*
Years	Team	Apps	(Gls)
2005–2007	Hamburger SV II	49	(3)
2006–2007	Hamburger SV	9	(0)
2007–2008	Derby County	10	(0)
2008–2011	AGF	54	(5)
2011–2012	New England Revolution	52	(5)
2013–2017	Sporting Kansas City	150	(29)
2018	Los Angeles FC	34	(3)
2019	Colorado Rapids	9	(2)
2019–2020	Sporting Kansas City	17	(2)
2025	Des Moines Menace	0	(0)
Total		384	(49)

International career
2005	United States U20	11	(0)
2007–2008	United States U23	6	(0)
2007–2017	United States	44	(2)

Managerial career
- 2020–2021: UCLA Bruins (assistant)
- 2021: Sporting Kansas City (technical staff)
- 2021: Sporting Kansas City (academy)
- 2022–2024: Sporting Kansas City II
- 2025: Oakland Roots
Medal record
Representing United States
FIFA Confederations Cup
Runner-up	2009 South Africa	Team
CONCACAF Gold Cup
Winner	CONCACAF Gold Cup	2007
Runner-up	CONCACAF Gold Cup	2009
Men's Soccer
- * Club domestic league appearances and goals

Benny Feilhaber (/ˈfeɪlhɑːbər/; born January 19, 1985) is a soccer coach and former professional player and most recently the head coach of the USL Championship team Oakland Roots. Born in Brazil, he represented the United States national team.

A midfielder, Feilhaber played for clubs in Germany, Denmark, England, and the United States. Feilhaber also represented the United States internationally, including at the 2010 FIFA World Cup.

== Early life ==
Feilhaber was born in Rio de Janeiro, Brazil. He is Jewish, and was raised in his father's Jewish religion. His paternal grandfather emigrated from the Austrian capital city of Vienna to Brazil in 1938 to escape the Nazi regime.

Feilhaber was six years old when his family moved from Brazil to settle in the United States and attended Nottingham Country Elementary in Katy, Texas. He spent approximately eight years in the New York City suburb of Scarsdale where he played for the local soccer team, the Scarsdale Lightning. In 1996, he led the team and won the New York State Cup for the U-12 division. He attended Northwood High School in Irvine, California, where he was a standout midfielder on the school's soccer team. He also played club soccer for the Irvine Strikers, winning various youth national titles. He was coached by youth coach Don Ebert.

After graduating in 2003, he played college soccer at the University of California, Los Angeles (UCLA), where he became a mainstay in the Bruins' midfield. At UCLA he was roommates with future national teammate Jonathan Bornstein. Feilhaber made the team as a walk-on, rather than being recruited with a scholarship offer. After his second year at UCLA Feilhaber was called up by the U.S. U-20 national soccer team to play in the 2005 FIFA World Youth Championship in the Netherlands.

== Club career ==
=== Hamburger SV ===
His performances in the tournament caught the attention of scouts from several European teams and, after representing the U.S. in the 2005 Maccabiah Games in Israel where he won a silver medal playing for it alongside Jonathan Bornstein and Leonid Krupnik, Feilhaber signed for Hamburger SV in July 2005. In the 2005–06 season, Feilhaber played with the Hamburg reserve team in the third division, or Regionalliga.

On October 12, 2006, Feilhaber made his Bundesliga debut, coming on as a second-half substitute in a 2–1 home loss to Schalke 04. His first start came on October 22, 2006, when he played ninety minutes in a 2–1 win against Bayer Leverkusen, Hamburg's first win of the season.

=== Derby County ===
On August 9, 2007, Feilhaber obtained a work permit to play for newly promoted Premier League side Derby County. His signing was completed on August 10, 2007, and Feilhaber made his debut for the club on September 17, 2007, coming on as an eightieth-minute substitute in a 1–0 win over Newcastle United. He earned his first start in a 1–0 loss to Reading on October 7.

After the sacking of manager Billy Davies and the appointment of Paul Jewell, Feilhaber saw little playing time at Pride Park. During the 2007–08 winter transfer window Feilhaber was linked with Israeli club Maccabi Tel Aviv and American club New England Revolution but neither deal was completed. Derby released Feilhaber on a free transfer after being relegated from the Premier League after only one season.

=== AGF Aarhus ===
On August 15, 2008, Feilhaber signed with Danish Superliga team Aarhus Gymnastikforening, commonly known as AGF. He made his debut for the club on September 1, 2008, coming on as a 59th-minute substitute in a 0–3 loss to FC Nordsjælland. He scored his first Superliga goal and was named Man of the Match against Randers on July 27, 2009.

During the spring season AGF struggled with injuries to key players, including Feilhaber. Feilhaber recovered slowly, but could not help the team avoid being relegated. Despite relegation Feilhaber remained at the club for the following season. Feilhaber clearly stated that he would have preferred a transfer to a bigger club, but when the transfer window closed he concentrated his efforts on the field. Feilhaber played very well in August, September, and October 2010, helping AGF to take a solid lead in the league. In the first 8 league games and 3 cup games, he scored six goals. Most notably he scored a hat-trick in the 6–3 win over Skive in a Danish Cup match. He also scored a superb goal from a free kick three minutes into added time against Køge securing a vital 3–2 win. Feilhaber gained significant respect from the fans due to his professional attitude in the fall of 2010.

After the winter break, AGF continued their winning streak in order to secure promotion to the Danish Superliga, but Feilhaber was mostly benched with a minor injury. On April 16, 2011, on the last day of the American transfer window, AGF sold Feilhaber to MLS.

Feilhaber made his debut for AGF in August 2008 and managed to play 58 games and scoring eight goals. His performance in the white jersey paved the way for his participation in the World Cup finals in South Africa with the U.S. national team.

=== New England Revolution ===
Feilhaber signed with MLS on April 15, 2011, and was assigned to the New England Revolution through the returning US National Team player allocation process on April 19, 2011. New England selected Feilhaber after both Chivas USA and Philadelphia Union had passed on selecting him. Feilhaber made his Revolution (and MLS) debut, and first full start, on April 23, in a 3-2 win over Sporting Kansas City. In that match, he recorded his first Revolution assist, setting up Marko Perović's 12th minute goal. Feilhaber scored his first Revolution goal on July 23 in a 2-2 draw against the Colorado Rapids.

In the 2011 New England Revolution season, Benny would make a total of 23 appearances for the Revolution (all starts), notching four goals, and leading the team in assists, with seven.

In the 2012 New England Revolution season, Feilhaber made 29 appearances (23 starts) for New England, recording a goal and two assists. His lone goal was scored on June 2 in a 2-0 win over the Chicago Fire.

=== Sporting Kansas City ===
Following the 2012 season, New England did not exercise his option. He was later traded to Sporting Kansas City in exchange for a 2014 MLS SuperDraft first-round pick, a 2015 MLS SuperDraft second-round pick, and allocation money. Benny quickly found success in Kansas City, featuring as a starter for the side that captured the 2013 MLS Cup.

The 2015 season saw a return to top form for Feilhaber. He became a focal point in the entire scheme of attack, being more of a playmaker than ever before. As of September 18, 2015, he had amassed in 31 competitive appearances, 12 goals and 19 assists. In November 2015, he was named one of the three finalists for both the 2015 MLS Landon Donovan MVP Award.

=== Los Angeles FC ===
Feilhaber was traded to expansion side Los Angeles FC on January 3, 2018, in exchange for $400,000 in allocation money. In 34 appearances for the franchise in its inaugural season he would score 3 goals and notch 6 assists. Despite playing all but one competitive match for the club that year, Feilhaber found himself out of contract at the end of the season and became a free agent.

=== Colorado Rapids ===
On January 11, 2019, Feilhaber joined Colorado Rapids.

=== Return to Kansas City ===
On May 8, 2019, Feilhaber was traded to Sporting Kansas City. He debuted on May 18 in a 1–1 draw with the Vancouver Whitecaps FC.

=== Retirement ===
After leaving Kansas City at the end of their 2019 season, Feilhaber officially announced his retirement from playing professional soccer on March 11, 2020.

=== Des Moines Menace ===
Along with a group of retired MLS players, including Sacha Kljestan, Osvaldo Alonso, Matt Hedges, Bradley Wright-Phillips, Feilhaber joined USL2 Amateur side Des Moines Menace for their two-match run in the 2025 U.S. Open Cup. Feilhaber logged 76 minutes and drew a penalty in a 2-1 victory against Sporting KC II, the team which he had formerly coached. He came on at halftime in a second-round defeat to Union Omaha and drew a penalty, which he converted for his first goal in more than five years, as Des Moines exited the tournament.

== International career ==
Feilhaber was called up twice to the senior United States national team for friendlies against Scotland on November 12, 2005, and Germany on March 22, 2006, but did not play in either game.

On November 30, 2006, he turned down an offer from Andreas Herzog to play for Austria and said that he would instead focus on earning a place on the U.S. national team.

On March 15, 2007, Feilhaber was again placed on the 24-man roster by coach Bob Bradley for friendly matches against Ecuador and Guatemala. Feilhaber made his first career start for the United States team in the March 25 game against Ecuador, and scored his first international goal against China on June 2. He scored the game-winning goal on a volley in the 2007 Gold Cup final on June 24 against Mexico.

After being demoted to the reserves at Derby and picking up a series of injuries, Feilhaber saw less time with the senior national team. However, Feilhaber was named to the United States Under-23 squad that competed at the 2008 Summer Olympics. He appeared as a substitute in all three games for the United States.

After more than a year since his last action with the senior team, Feilhaber was named to the United States roster for the 2009 FIFA Confederations Cup. Along with former UCLA teammate Jonathan Bornstein and fellow UCLA alum Carlos Bocanegra, Feilhaber played in the upset of top-ranked Spain in a semi-final game on June 24, 2009. He orchestrated the second goal, rounding Gerard Pique to find Landon Donovan, who found Clint Dempsey for the finish in the center. He then appeared in the final, in which the United States fell to Brazil, the country of his birth, 3–2.

Feilhaber was a part of the 23-man squad for the FIFA World Cup 2010 in South Africa. Feilhaber was used as a substitute, gaining playing time in two of the three group stage matches—a draw against Slovenia and a victory against Algeria. The United States finished at the top of Group C. In the Round of 16, Feilhaber was substituted in for Robbie Findley in the second half of the match against Ghana. Commentators remarked on his ability to generate plays and praised his readiness to make decisions, many of which were key passes to set up chances to score. One such pass was a through ball for Clint Dempsey, who was then fouled in the box. Landon Donovan took the subsequent penalty and scored to tie the score at 1–1, although Ghana would later come back in the first half of extra time to score through Asamoah Gyan, ending the game 2–1.

Feilhaber was not called up to a national camp from January 2014 until October 2017, even during and after his 2015 MLS Landon Donovan MVP Award finalist season. This has led Feilhaber become critical of national team manager Jürgen Klinsmann and his selection of players, saying "I don't think Jurgen calls in the best players that are available to him." Feilhaber went on to mention Sacha Kljestan, Dax McCarty, Matt Hedges, and Eric Lichaj as other players performing well that have not been called up by Klinsmann. Klinsmann responded that Feilhaber was not able to perform as well as the national team staff hoped in prior camps, and saying that "He doesn't have a coach's perspective. He doesn't know how we put the pieces together. He doesn't know how we evaluate every position, how we evaluated the pieces that we need to connect."

== Coaching career ==
On August 25, 2020, Feilhaber returned to his former youth club UCLA Bruins as an assistant coach under head coach Ryan Jorden. He left the position on January 26, 2021, to return to Sporting Kansas City, becoming the Director of Technical Operations on the Sporting KC technical staff. On August 23, he was appointed U-17 manager at Sporting Kansas' academy.

Feilhaber was named head coach of Sporting Kansas City II for the 2022 season. In November 2024, Sporting KC announced that Feilhaber would not be returning as head coach of Sporting Kansas City II in 2025.

== Personal life ==
Born in Rio de Janeiro, Feilhaber has stated that he supports the Brazilian team Botafogo. His father is a supporter of the team, and he has been one since a child.

He married his wife, Michele, on December 15, 2012. Feilhaber has a daughter named Sofia, a daughter named Julia and a son named Luca.

== Career statistics ==
=== Club ===
Appearances and goals by club, season and competition
Club	Season	League			Cup		Continental		Other		Total	
Club	Season	Division	Apps	Goals	Apps	Goals	Apps	Goals	Apps	Goals	Apps	Goals
Hamburger SV II	2005–06	Regionalliga Nord	30	2	—		—		—		30	2
Hamburger SV II	2006–07	Regionalliga Nord	19	1	—		—		—		19	1
Hamburger SV II	Total		49	3	—		—		—		49	3
Hamburger SV	2006–07	Bundesliga	9	0	0	0	3 (Note: Appearances in the UEFA Champions League.)	0	—		12	0
Derby County	2007–08	Premier League	10	0	0	0	—		—		10	0
Aarhus	2008–09	Danish Superliga	10	0	0	0	—		—		10	0
Aarhus	2009–10	Danish Superliga	26	1	1	0	—		—		27	1
Aarhus	2010–11	Danish 1st Division	18	4	1	0	—		—		19	4
Aarhus	Total		54	5	2	0	—		—		56	5
New England Revolution	2011	MLS	23	4	0	0	—		—		23	4
New England Revolution	2012	MLS	29	1	1	1	—		—		30	2
New England Revolution	Total		52	5	1	1	—		—		53	6
Sporting Kansas City	2013	MLS	27	3	2	0	3 (Note: Appearances in the CONCACAF Champions League.)	0	4 (Note: Appearances in the MLS Cup Playoffs.)	0	36	3
Sporting Kansas City	2014	MLS	31	4	0	0	6	1	1	0	38	5
Sporting Kansas City	2015	MLS	32	10	5	2	—		1	0	38	12
Sporting Kansas City	2016	MLS	30	7	2	1	—		1	0	33	8
Sporting Kansas City	2017	MLS	30	5	4	0	—		1	0	35	5
Sporting Kansas City	Total		150	29	13	3	9	1	8	0	180	33
Los Angeles FC	2018	MLS	34	3	3	1	—		1	0	38	4
Colorado Rapids	2019	MLS	9	2	0	0	—		—		9	2
Sporting Kansas City	2019	MLS	17	2	1	0	—		—		18	2
Career total			384	49	20	5	12	1	9	0	425	54

=== International ===
Appearances and goals by national team and year
National team	Year	Apps	Goals
United States
United States	2007	14	2
United States	2008	2	0
United States	2009	14	0
United States	2010	8	0
United States	2012	1	0
United States	2013	1	0
United States	2014	1	0
United States	2017	3	0
Total		44	2

Scores and results list the United States' goal tally first, score column indicates score after each Feilhaber goal.

List of international goals scored by Benny Feilhaber
No.	Date	Venue	Opponent	Score	Result	Competition
1	June 2, 2007	Spartan Stadium, San Jose, United States	China	2–1	4–1	Friendly
2	June 24, 2007	Soldier Field, Chicago, United States	Mexico	2–1	2–1	2007 CONCACAF Gold Cup

== Honors ==
United States

- CONCACAF Gold Cup: 2007

Sporting Kansas City

- MLS Cup: 2013
- U.S. Open Cup: 2015, 2017

Individual

- MLS All-Star: 2015
- MLS Best XI: 2015
- In 2010 he was inducted into the Southern California Jewish Sports Hall of Fame.

== See also ==
- Austrian Brazilian
- List of select Jewish football (association; soccer) players
