= Aurélien Collin =

French footballer (born 1986)

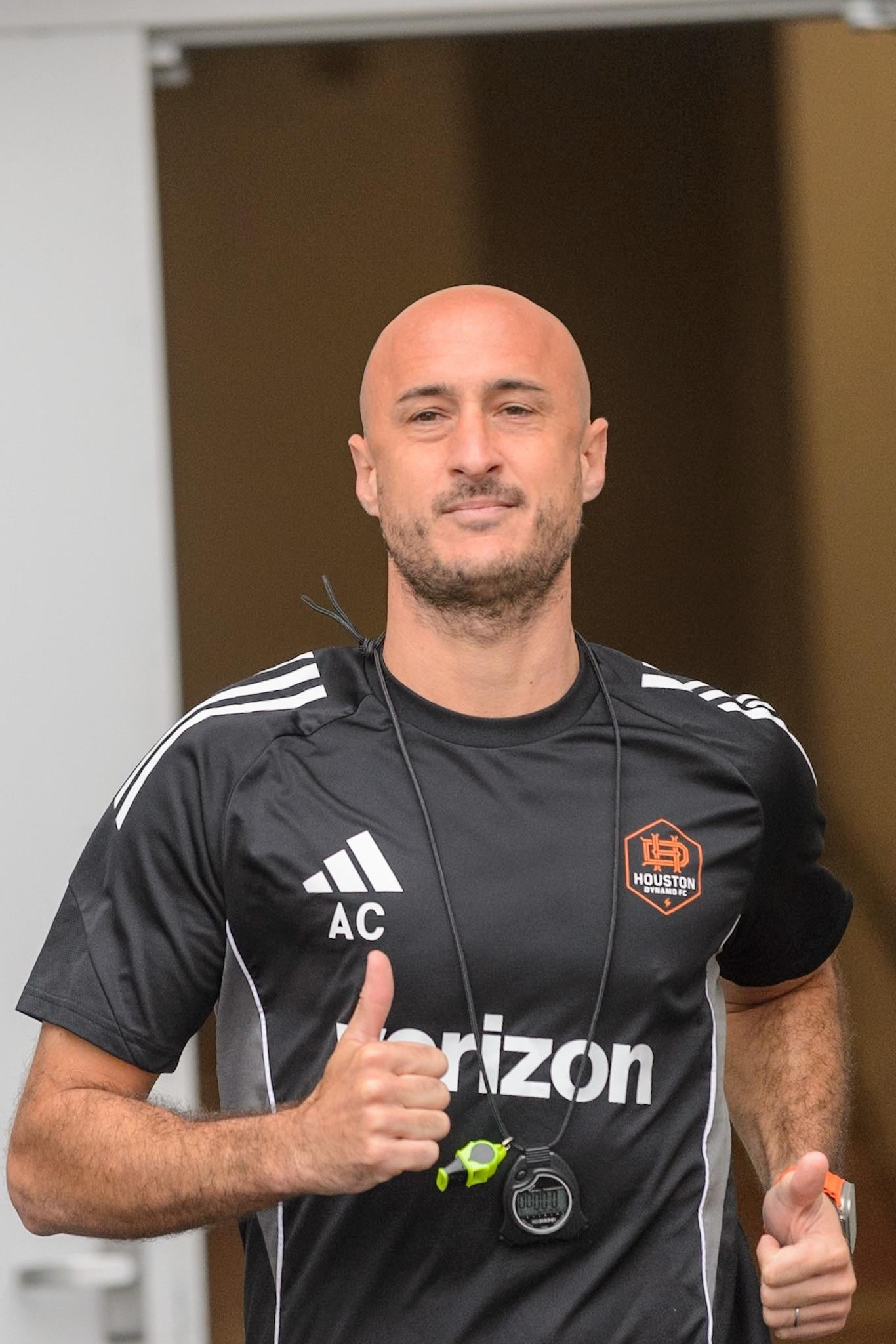
- Collin in 2025.

Personal information
- Full name: Aurélien Collin
- Date of birth: 8 March 1986 (age 40)
- Place of birth: Enghien-les-Bains, France
- Height: 1.88 m (6 ft 2 in)
- Position: Defender

Youth career
- 2004–2005: Sedan
- 2005–2007: Amiens
- 2007: Mallorca

Senior career*
Years	Team	Apps	(Gls)
2007–2008	Gretna	19	(0)
2008–2009	Panserraikos	9	(0)
2009	Wrexham	12	(0)
2009–2011	Vitoria Setubal	33	(3)
2011–2014	Sporting Kansas City	107	(11)
2015–2016	Orlando City	30	(2)
2016–2018	New York Red Bulls	39	(0)
2019–2021	Philadelphia Union	6	(0)
Total		255	(16)

Managerial career
- 2023–2026: Houston Dynamo (assistant)
- 2026–: Cercle Brugge (assistant)
- * Club domestic league appearances and goals as of 21 November 2021

Aurélien Collin (French pronunciation: [oʁeljɛ̃ kɔlɛ̃]; born 8 March 1986) is a French former professional footballer who played as a defender. He spent the majority of his career playing in Major League Soccer. He is currently an assistant coach of Belgian Pro League clubs Cercle Brugge.

== Playing career ==
=== Europe ===
Collin began his career in the youth ranks of French side Sedan in 2004 and remained with the club until joining Amiens one year later. In 2007, he left for Spain joining the youth ranks of Mallorca.

Collin joined Scottish club Gretna from La Liga club Mallorca in August 2007, receiving international clearance to play for the club on 14 August. He signed a two-year contract with the club. He made his debut for the club in a 1–1 draw with Hearts on 18 August. He scored an own goal in a 4–0 defeat against Rangers on 1 September 2007 at Ibrox Stadium.

Following his release by Gretna, Collin spent a week on trial with English Championship club Blackpool, having also been on trial with fellow Championship clubs, Preston North End, and later, Wolverhampton Wanderers. However, none of these trials led to a permanent deal being offered. He later signed a one-year contract with Greek club Panserraikos.

On 5 February 2009, Collin joined Conference club Wrexham on a one-year contract until the end of the season, making his debut in a 0–0 draw with Ebbsfleet United. On 5 August 2009, he joined Portuguese side Vitoria Setubal on a free transfer and a two-year deal. He scored his first goal with Vitoria on 16 January 2010 in a 2–2 draw with Vitória Guimarães. While with the Portuguese side, Collin appeared in 37 matches and scored five goals.

=== United States ===
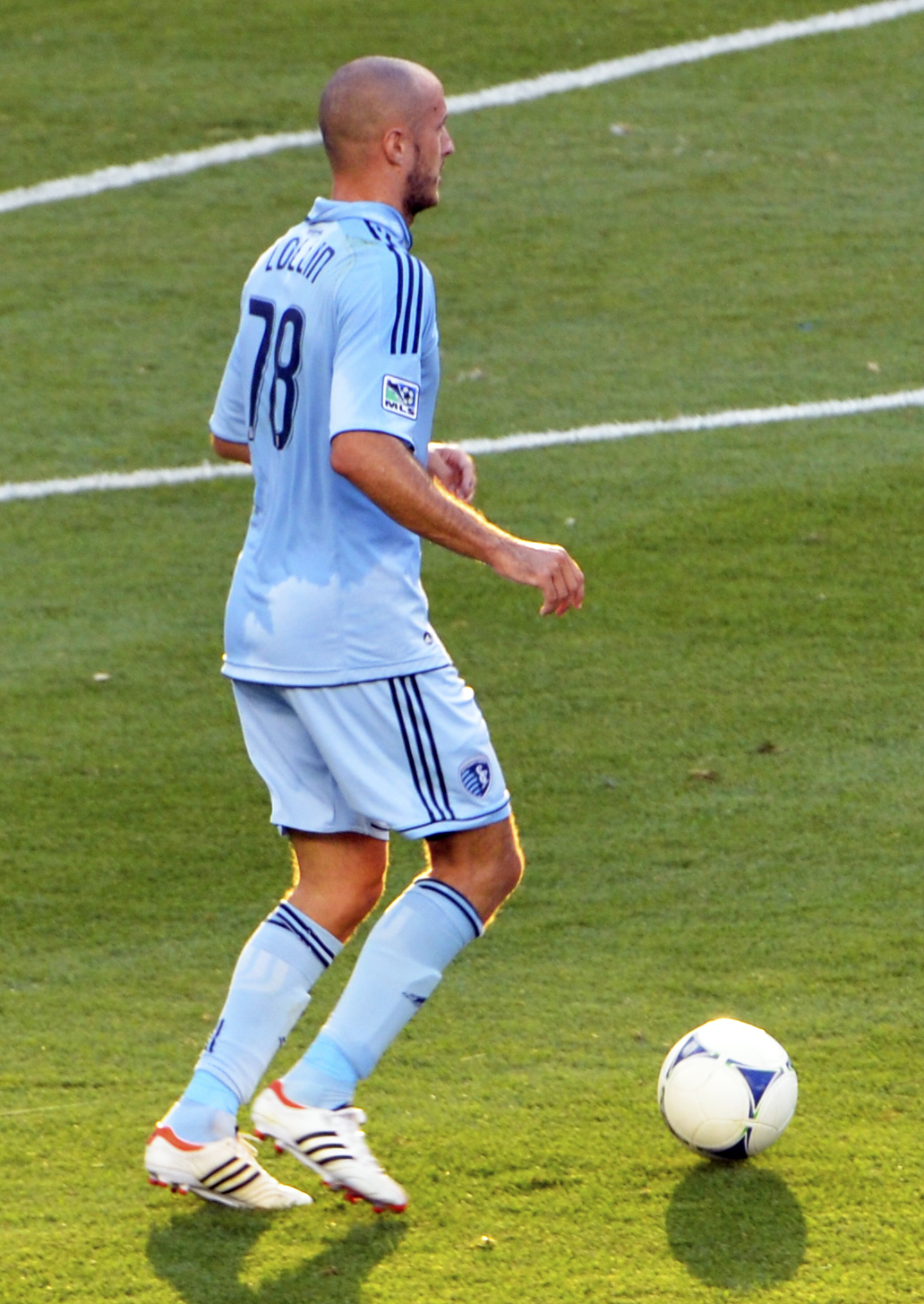
Collin playing for Sporting Kansas City

On 15 April 2011, Collin signed a contract with Sporting Kansas City of Major League Soccer. In his first season in Kansas City, Collin established himself as a starter playing alongside Matt Besler. The following season, he helped Kansas City in capturing the 2012 U.S. Open Cup. On 7 December 2013, Collin scored the game tying goal in the 2013 MLS Cup final, rifling home a header from a Graham Zusi corner kick against Real Salt Lake. He was awarded the MLS Cup MVP as Sporting Kansas City won the match on penalties to claim the title, following his equalizer by converting the decisive spot kick in the tenth round. During the club's title run Collin appeared in 5 matches and scored three goals.

On 8 December 2014, Collin was traded from Sporting Kansas City to new expansion side Orlando City SC for allocation money and defender Jalil Anibaba. Collin got himself sent off for a challenge made on David Villa on his debut against New York City FC. In his first season with the club, he appeared in 28 league matches scoring two goals.

On 29 April 2016 Collin was acquired from Orlando by New York Red Bulls. On 6 May 2016 he made his debut for the club in a 1–1 draw against his former club Orlando City SC. In mid May he helped his new side to consecutive shut out victories, including a 7-0 Hudson River derby victory against New York City FC on 21 May 2016.

Collin was released by the Red Bulls at the end of their 2018 season. On 22 January 2019, it was announced that Collin had joined the Philadelphia Union. Collin's contract with Philadelphia expired following their 2020 season. However, he re-signed for the club ahead of the 2021 season. Following the 2021 season, Collin's contract option was declined by Philadelphia. On 24 March 2022, Collin announced his retirement from football.

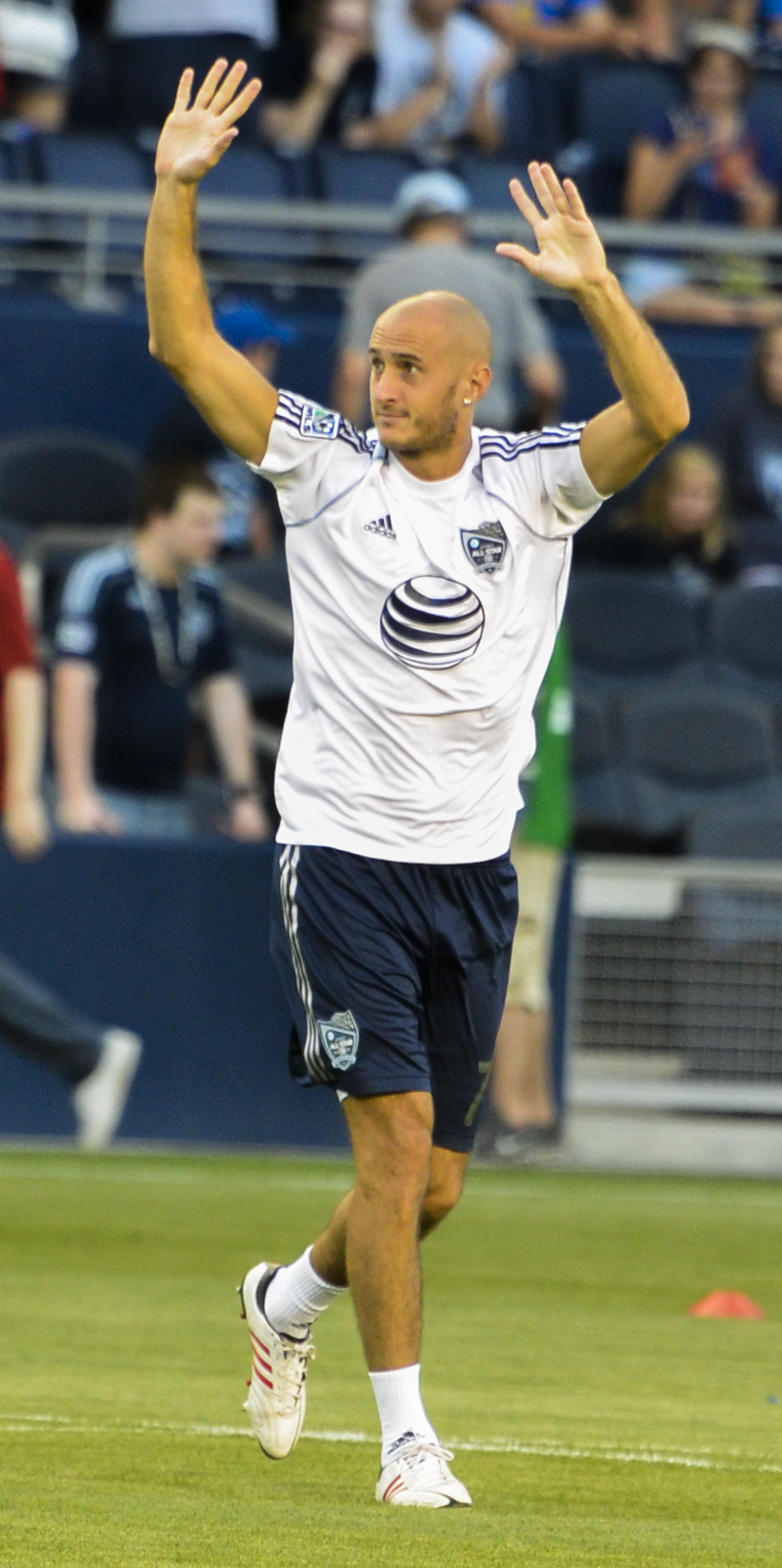
Collin playing for MLS All Stars in 2013.

== Coaching career ==
On 5 January 2023, Collin was announced as an assistant coach for Major League Soccer side Houston Dynamo, working with head coach Ben Olsen.

== Personal life ==
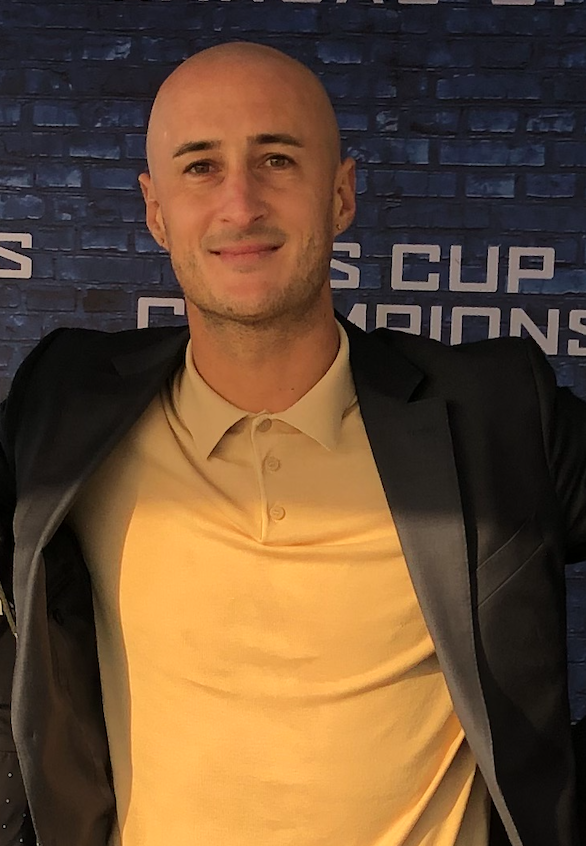
Aurelien Collin pictured with a fan, just six months after retiring from professional football.

While playing for Sporting Kansas City, Collin started studying for an online degree in fashion design. "Since I was young I was into fashion and following the best designers and going to fashion shows," he explained. "I read the magazines about fashion every day. I love it. It's one of my passions. I have a lot of projects in my mind. A lot of things I began here. But I need to study first to be the best so I can really begin my projects." Collin was a fan favorite at Sporting Kansas City, giving away his game-worn jersey to a fan after every home game.

== Career statistics ==
As of 22 July 2021

Appearances and goals by club, season and competition
Club	Season	League			National Cup		League Cup		Continental		Total	
Club	Season	Division	Apps	Goals	Apps	Goals	Apps	Goals	Apps	Goals	Apps	Goals
Gretna	2007–08	Scottish First Division	19	0	0	0	0	0	–		19	0
Panserraikos	2008–09	Super League Greece	9	0	0	0	–		–		9	0
Wrexham	2008–09	Conference Premier	12	0	0	0	–		–		12	0
Vitória de Setúbal	2009–10	Primeira Liga	19	3	3	1	0	0	–		22	4
Vitória de Setúbal	2010–11	Primeira Liga	14	0	1	1	1	1	–		16	2
Vitória de Setúbal	Total		33	3	4	2	1	1	0	0	38	6
Sporting Kansas City	2011	Major League Soccer	23	3	2	0	3 (Note: Appearances in MLS Cup)	1	–		28	4
Sporting Kansas City	2012	Major League Soccer	29	3	3	0	2	0	–		34	3
Sporting Kansas City	2013	Major League Soccer	29	3	2	0	5	3	3 (Note: Appearances in CONCACAF Champions League)	0	39	6
Sporting Kansas City	2014	Major League Soccer	26	2	1	0	1	0	3	0	31	2
Sporting Kansas City	Total		107	11	8	0	9	4	6	0	132	15
Orlando City	2015	Major League Soccer	28	2	0	0	–		–		28	2
Orlando City	2016	Major League Soccer	2	0	0	0	–		–		2	0
Orlando City	Total		30	2	0	0	0	0	0	0	30	2
New York Red Bulls	2016	Major League Soccer	23	0	2	0	2	0	4	0	31	0
New York Red Bulls	2017	Major League Soccer	9	0	2	0	0	0	2	0	13	0
New York Red Bulls	2018	Major League Soccer	7	0	2	0	0	0	4	0	13	0
New York Red Bulls	Total		39	0	6	0	2	0	10	0	57	0
Philadelphia Union	2019	Major League Soccer	6	0	1	0	–		–		7	0
Philadelphia Union	2020	Major League Soccer	0	0	0	0	–		–		0	0
Philadelphia Union	2021	Major League Soccer	0	0	0	0	–		1	0	1	0
Philadelphia Union	Total		6	0	1	0	0	0	1	0	8	0
Total			255	16	19	2	14	5	17	0	305	23

== Honours ==
Sporting Kansas City

- MLS Cup: 2013
- U.S. Open Cup: 2012

New York Red Bulls

- Supporters' Shield: 2018

Philadelphia Union

- Supporters' Shield: 2020

Individual

- MLS Best XI: 2012
- MLS Cup MVP: 2013
