= Igor Julião =

Brazilian footballer (born 1994)

Personal information
- Full name: Igor de Carvalho Julião
- Date of birth: 23 August 1994 (age 32)
- Place of birth: Rio de Janeiro, Brazil
- Height: 1.73 m (5 ft 8 in)
- Position: Right-back

Team information
- Current team: Marítimo
- Number: 2

Youth career
- 2003–2012: Fluminense

Senior career*
Years	Team	Apps	(Gls)
2012–2021	Fluminense	87	(1)
2014	→ Sporting Kansas City (loan)	25	(0)
2015	→ ABC (loan)	2	(0)
2015	→ Macaé (loan)	7	(0)
2016	→ Ferroviária (loan)	12	(0)
2017	→ Sporting Kansas City (loan)	1	(0)
2017–2018	→ ŠTK Šamorín (loan)	26	(4)
2021–2023	Vizela	33	(1)
2023–	Marítimo	65	(3)

International career
2013	Brazil U20	3	(0)
- * Club domestic league appearances and goals as of 19 June 2026

Igor de Carvalho Julião (born 23 August 1994), commonly known as Igor Julião, is a Brazilian professional footballer who plays as a right-back for Primeira Liga club Marítimo.

== Personal life ==
Julião likes to read German philosopher Friedrich Nietzsche and he is also a fan of Mexican painter Frida Kahlo.

== Career statistics ==
As of 30 March 2024

Appearances and goals by club, season and competitio
Club	Season	League			State league		Cup		Continental		Other		Total	
Club	Season	Division	Apps	Goals	Apps	Goals	Apps	Goals	Apps	Goals	Apps	Goals	Apps	Goals
Fluminense	2012	Série A	1	0	—		—		—		—		1	0
Fluminense	2013	Série A	20	0	—		2	0	—		—		22	0
Fluminense	2015	Série A	—		0	0	—		—		—		0	0
Fluminense	2016	Série A	5	0	—		—		—		—		5	0
Fluminense	2018	Série A	8	0	—		—		—		—		8	0
Fluminense	2019	Série A	15	0	2 (Note: Appearance(s) in Campeonato Carioca)	0	0	0	6 (Note: Appearance(s) in Copa Sudamericana)	0	—		23	0
Fluminense	2020	Série A	20	0	4	0	1	0	0	0	—		25	0
Fluminense	2021	Série A	0	0	3	1	0	0	0	0	—		3	1
Fluminense	Total		69	0	9	1	3	0	6	0	—		87	1
Sporting Kansas City (loan)	2014	MLS	23	0	—		0	0	3 (Note: Appearance(s) in CONCACAF Champions Cup)	0	—		26	0
Sporting Kansas City (loan)	2017	MLS	1	0	—		0	0	—		0	0	1	0
Sporting Kansas City (loan)	Total		24	0	—		0	0	3	0	0	0	27	0
ABC (loan)	2015	Série B	2	0	—		—		—		—		2	0
Macaé (loan)	2015	Série B	7	0	—		—		—		—		7	0
Ferroviária (loan)	2016	Paulistão	—		10 (Note: Appearance(s) in Campeonato Paulista)	0	2	0	—		—		12	0
ŠTK Šamorín (loan)	2017-18	2. Liga	25	4	—		1	0	—		—		26	4
Vizela	2021-22	Primeira Liga	13	0	—		3	0	—		0	0	16	0
Vizela	2022-23	Primeira Liga	20	1	—		—		—		3 (Note: Appearance(s) in Taça da Liga)	0	23	1
Vizela	Total		33	1	—		3	0	—		3	0	39	1
Marítimo	2023-24	Liga Portugal 2	21	2	—		2	0	—		1	0	24	2
Career Total			181	7	19	1	10	0	9	0	4	0	223	8
