= MLS Cup 2013 =

2013 edition of the MLS Cup

- Event: MLS Cup
Sporting Kansas City	Real Salt Lake
1	1
- After extra time Sporting Kansas City won 7–6 on penalties
- Date: December 7, 2013
- Venue: Sporting Park, Kansas City, Kansas, US
- MLS Cup MVP: Aurélien Collin (Sporting Kansas City)
- Referee: Hilario Grajeda
- Attendance: 21,650
- Weather: Sunny, 22 °F (−6 °C)

MLS Cup 2013, the 18th edition of Major League Soccer's championship match, was a soccer match which took place on Saturday, December 7, 2013, between Sporting Kansas City and Real Salt Lake at Sporting Park in Kansas City, Kansas, United States. The soccer match was to decide the winner of the 2013 season. Sporting KC were making their third appearance in the competition's final, having won in 2000 and losing in 2004. RSL were appearing in their second final, having won their only other in 2009.

It was the first MLS Cup final to be held at Sporting Park and the second time the championship match was not held at a predetermined neutral site. Sporting Kansas City won the right to host the match by besting Real Salt Lake in the regular season standings. This was the first time Kansas City hosted an MLS Cup final and the second final hosted at Sporting Park, the other being the 2012 U.S. Open Cup final.

MLS Cup 2013 was the coldest match in league history, with a recorded temperature of 22 °F (−6 °C) at kickoff, and broke a record set two weeks earlier by Kansas City in the Eastern Conference Final. The match was tied 1–1 after regulation time and extra time. The penalty shootout was won 7–6 by Sporting Kansas City, ending with the longest shootout in MLS Cup history at ten rounds.

== Road to the final ==
Both teams qualified for the playoffs by finishing in the top five of their respective conferences at the end of the regular season. Sporting Kansas City then beat New England Revolution and Houston Dynamo to reach the final, while Real Salt Lake knocked out defending champions Los Angeles Galaxy and Portland Timbers.

Sporting Kansas City
Round
Real Salt Lake

Eastern Conference
Team	GP	W	L	T	GF	GA	GD	Pts.
New York Red Bulls	34	17	9	8	58	41	+17	59
Sporting Kansas City	34	17	10	7	47	30	+17	58
New England Revolution	34	14	11	9	49	38	+11	51
Houston Dynamo	34	14	11	9	41	41	0	51
Montreal Impact	34	14	13	7	50	49	+1	49

Regular season

Western Conference
Team	GP	W	L	T	GF	GA	GD	Pts.
Portland Timbers	34	14	5	15	54	33	+21	57
Real Salt Lake	34	16	10	8	57	41	+16	56
Los Angeles Galaxy	34	15	11	8	53	38	+15	53
Seattle Sounders FC	34	15	12	7	42	42	0	52
Colorado Rapids	34	14	11	9	45	38	+7	51

Opponent
Result
Legs
Playoffs
Opponent
Result
Legs
New England Revolution
4–3
1–2 away; 3–1 home
Conf. Semifinals
Los Angeles Galaxy
2–1
0–1 away; 2–0 home
Houston Dynamo
2–1
0–0 away; 2–1 home
Conference Finals
Portland Timbers
5–2
4–2 home; 1–0 away

== Pre-match ==
The 2013 Cup was the first-ever small media market cup, with both Kansas City and Salt Lake City outside of the Top 10 media markets in the US (Kansas City is #28 and Salt Lake City is #32). The tickets for the match were the highest price for the MLS Cup in the past five years, coming in at an average of $302 on the secondary market. This made it the highest priced sports event in the Kansas City area in four years, with the exception of the 2012 MLB All-Star Game.

== Match ==
=== Details ===
December 7, 2013
3:00 p.m. CST

Sporting Kansas City	1–1 (a.e.t.)	Real Salt Lake
Collin 76'	Report	Saborío 52'
Penalties
Bieler (penalty scored); Nagamura (penalty scored); Besler (penalty missed); Feilhaber (penalty scored); Zusi (penalty missed); Sinovic (penalty scored); Sapong (penalty scored); Olum (penalty missed); Myers (penalty scored); Collin (penalty scored)	7–6	(penalty missed) Saborío; (penalty missed) Grabavoy; (penalty scored) Beckerman; (penalty scored) Plata; (penalty scored) Morales; (penalty scored) Schuler; (penalty scored) Beltran; (penalty missed) Velásquez; (penalty scored) Borchers; (penalty missed) Palmer

Sporting Park, Kansas City, Kansas
Attendance: 21,650
Referee: Hilario Grajeda

Sporting Kansas City	Real Salt Lake

GK	1	(Denmark) Jimmy Nielsen (c)
RB	7	(United States) Chance Myers
CB	78	(France) Aurélien Collin	(yellow card) 35'
CB	5	(United States) Matt Besler
LB	15	(United States) Seth Sinovic
RM	6	(Brazil) Paulo Nagamura
CM	20	(Spain) Oriol Rosell		(substituted off) 8'
LM	10	(United States) Benny Feilhaber	(yellow card) 103'
RW	8	(United States) Graham Zusi
CF	14	(England) Dom Dwyer		(substituted off) 72'
LW	17	(United States) C. J. Sapong
Substitutes:
GK	18	(United States) Eric Kronberg
MF	37	(United States) Jacob Peterson
DF	23	(Argentina) Federico Bessone
FW	16	(Argentina) Claudio Bieler		(substituted on) 72'
DF	3	(United States) Ike Opara
FW	9	(United States) Teal Bunbury
DF	13	(Kenya) Lawrence Olum		(substituted on) 8'
Manager:
(United States) Peter Vermes

GK	18	(United States) Nick Rimando
RB	2	(United States) Tony Beltran
CB	6	(United States) Nat Borchers
CB	28	(United States) Chris Schuler
LB	17	(United States) Chris Wingert	(yellow card) 24'	(substituted off) 72'
DM	5	(United States) Kyle Beckerman (c)	(yellow card) 100'
RM	21	(United States) Luis Gil		(substituted off) 87'
LM	20	(United States) Ned Grabavoy
AM	11	(Argentina) Javier Morales
ST	15	(Costa Rica) Álvaro Saborío	(yellow card) 44'
ST	10	(United States) Robbie Findley		(substituted off) 112'
Substitutes:
DF	7	(Jamaica) Lovel Palmer		(substituted on) 72'
DF	44	(United States) Brandon McDonald
GK	24	(United States) Jeff Attinella
MF	12	(United States) Cole Grossman
FW	8	(Ecuador) Joao Plata		(substituted on) 112'
MF	26	(Colombia) Sebastián Velásquez		(substituted on) 87'
FW	13	(Colombia) Olmes García
Manager:
(United States) Jason Kreis

MLS Cup MVP:
Aurélien Collin (Sporting Kansas City)

Assistant referees:
Paul Scott
Bill Dittmar
Fourth official:
Ismail Elfath

Match rules

- 90 minutes.
- 30 minutes of extra time if necessary.
- Penalty shootout if scores still level.
- Seven named substitutes.
- Maximum of three substitutions.

=== Statistics ===
Overall
	Sporting Kansas City	Real Salt Lake
Goals scored	1	1
Total shots	24	12
Shots on target	5	2
Saves	1	4
Corner kicks	9	1
Fouls committed	19	21
Offsides	4	3
Yellow cards	2	3
Red cards	0	0

== Post-match ==
As MLS Cup finalists, both teams were supposed to be qualified for the 2014–15 CONCACAF Champions League. Sporting Kansas City (the champion) was to be placed in pot A, and Real Salt Lake (the runner-up) was to be placed in pot B. However, on December 13, 2013, CONCACAF accepted the US Soccer/MLS proposal to change the qualification rules, so that the spot reserved for the MLS Cup runner-up was instead awarded to the regular season conference winner that was not the Supporters' Shield champion, the Portland Timbers. Sporting Kansas City was not affected by this change.
