= Erik Palmer-Brown =

American soccer player

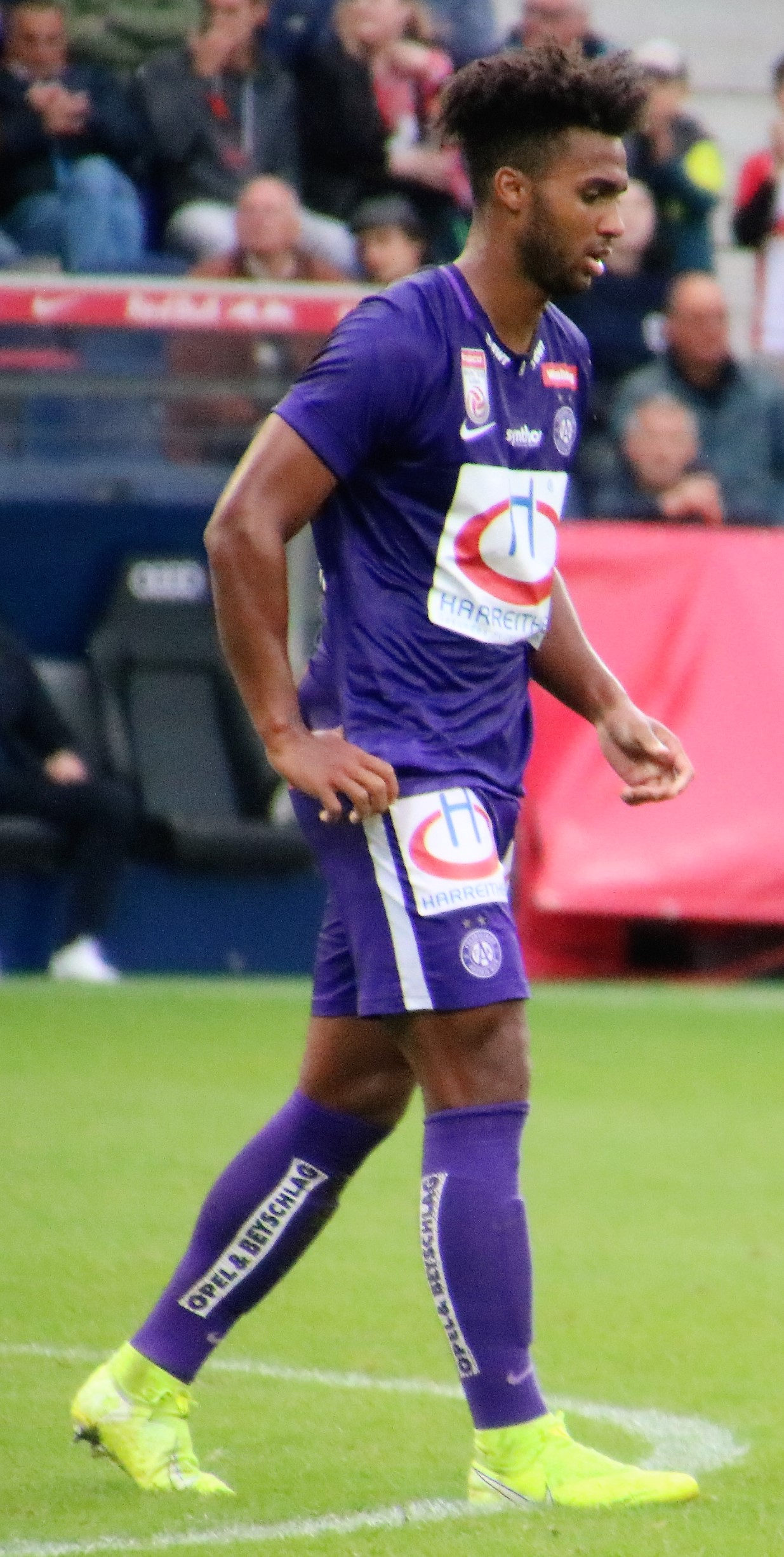
- Palmer-Brown with Austria Wien in 2019

Personal information
- Full name: Erik Ross Palmer-Brown
- Date of birth: April 24, 1997 (age 29)
- Place of birth: Napoleon, Ohio, United States
- Height: 6 ft 1 in (1.86 m)
- Position: Center-back

Team information
- Current team: Panathinaikos
- Number: 14

Youth career
- 2009–2013: Sporting Kansas City

Senior career*
Years	Team	Apps	(Gls)
2013–2017	Sporting Kansas City	20	(0)
2016	→ Porto B (loan)	17	(0)
2017	Swope Park Rangers	5	(0)
2018–2022	Manchester City	0	(0)
2018	→ Kortrijk (loan)	9	(0)
2018–2019	→ NAC Breda (loan)	18	(1)
2019–2021	→ Austria Wien (loan)	52	(2)
2021–2022	→ Troyes (loan)	21	(0)
2022–2023	Troyes	38	(0)
2023–	Panathinaikos	23	(0)

International career
2013	United States U17	5	(0)
2014–2015	United States U18	6	(1)
2014–2017	United States U20	17	(1)
2018–2022	United States	4	(0)
Medal record
Representing United States
First place	CONCACAF U-20 Championship	2017
- * Club domestic league appearances and goals as of February 28, 2026

Erik Ross Palmer-Brown (born April 24, 1997) is an American professional soccer player who plays as a center-back for Greek Super League club Panathinaikos.

== Club career ==
=== Sporting Kansas City ===
Palmer-Brown moved to Lee's Summit, Missouri when he was 18 months old. He later played one season of high school soccer as a freshman at Lee's Summit High School in the fall of 2011. He also attended Archbishop O'Hara High School in Kansas City, Missouri. After playing in the U.S. Soccer Development Academy, at the age of 16, he signed his first professional contract, making him Sporting Kansas City's youngest ever player.

In January 2014, Serie A team Juventus reportedly made a $1 million bid for Erik Palmer-Brown, which was rejected by Sporting Kansas City. In the same year, Palmer-Brown was voted number 39 on UK website TeamTalk's top 50 Wonderkids in 2014.

He made his debut for Sporting Kansas City on May 18, 2014, in a regular season match against Chicago Fire. But it ended prematurely when he was sent off in the 64th minute for a second yellow card after giving away a penalty in the 15th minute in a 2–1 loss.

=== Porto ===
On February 1, 2016, Palmer-Brown was loaned to Portuguese club Porto until December 31, 2016. He started regularly in central defense for Porto B, helping them to the LigaPro title.

=== Manchester City ===
Palmer-Brown signed a contract with Premier League side Manchester City. He was immediately loaned to Belgian First Division A club KV Kortrijk until the end of the 2017–18 season.

==== Loan to NAC Breda ====
After spending the second half of the 2017–18 season with Kortrijk, Palmer-Brown was loaned to NAC Breda in the Eredivisie for the 2018–19 season.

==== Loan to Austria Wien ====
He then joined Austria Wien for the 2019–20 season. He extended his loan at Austria Wien for the 2020–21 season.

==== Loan to Troyes ====
On August 31, 2021, he moved to France to join Ligue 1 club Troyes on a season-long loan deal. In February 2022, the deal was made permanent with Palmer-Brown signing a contract until the summer of 2024.

=== Panathinaikos ===
On August 2, 2023, Greece's Super League runner-up Panathinaikos F.C. from Athens signed Erik Palmer-Brown for a 4-year contract deal.

== International career ==
=== 2013–2017: Youth level ===
Palmer-Brown has represented the United States at the U-15, U-17, U-18, and U-20 levels. He has made 6 appearances for the U-18 team up to this point, scoring his first goal for the team in a 1–0 win over the Czech Republic. In 2015, he was called to the roster that played in the 2015 FIFA U-20 World Cup.

As captain, Palmer-Brown won the 2017 CONCACAF U-20 Championship with the United States. He was awarded the Golden Ball Award by CONCACAF as the best player of the tournament, playing the defensive midfield position. Palmer-Brown then played in central defense for the United States at the 2017 FIFA U-20 World Cup, and was named to the Best XI of the Tournament by both Squawka and Scouted Football.

=== 2018: Debut ===
On May 28, 2018, Palmer-Brown made his senior national team debut in a 3–0 win against Bolivia.

== Personal life ==
Palmer-Brown was a student of Archbishop O'Hara High School in Kansas City, Missouri. He was confirmed as a Catholic in 2015.

== Career statistics ==
=== Club ===
As of 11 February 2026

Appearances and goals by club, season and competition
Club	Season	League			National cup (Note: Includes US Open Cup, Austrian Cup, Coupe de France, Greek Cup)		Continental		Other		Total	
Club	Season	Division	Apps	Goals	Apps	Goals	Apps	Goals	Apps	Goals	Apps	Goals
Sporting Kansas City	2014	MLS	3	0	0	0	0	0	—		3	0
Sporting Kansas City	2015	MLS	7	0	0	0	1 (Note: appearance(s) in CONCACAF Champions League)	0	—		8	0
Sporting Kansas City	2017	MLS	10	0	2	0	—		—		12	0
Sporting Kansas City	Total		20	0	2	0	1	0	0	0	23	0
Porto B (loan)	2015–16	LigaPro	11	0	0	0	1 (Note: Appearance(s) in Premier League International Cup)	0	—		12	0
Porto B (loan)	2016–17	LigaPro	6	0	0	0	2	1	—		8	1
Porto B (loan)	Total		17	0	0	0	3	1	0	0	20	1
Sporting Kansas City II	2017	USL	5	0	0	0	—		1 (Note: Appearance(s) in USL Cup)	0	6	0
Kortrijk (loan)	2017–18	Belgian Pro League	1	0	0	0	—		8 (Note: Appearances in Belgian Pro League European playoffs)	0	6	0
NAC Breda (loan)	2018–19	Eredivisie	18	1	0	0	—		—		18	1
Austria Wien (loan)	2019–20	Austrian Bundesliga	22	2	1	0	—		3 (Note: Appearances in Bundesliga Europacup-Play-off)	0	26	2
Austria Wien (loan)	2020–21	Austrian Bundesliga	24	0	2	0	—		3	0	29	0
Austria Wien (loan)	Total		46	2	3	0	0	0	6	0	55	2
Troyes (loan)	2021–22	Ligue 1	21	0	1	0	—		—		22	0
Troyes	2022–23	Ligue 1	38	0	0	0	—		—		38	0
Panathinaikos	2023–24	Super League Greece	3	0	0	0	0	0	—		3	0
Panathinaikos	2024–25	Super League Greece	4	0	3	0	1 (Note: Appearance(s) in UEFA Conference League)	0	3 (Note: Appearances in Super League Greece Play-off)	0	11	0
Panathinaikos	2025–26	Super League Greece	13	0	1	0	12 (Note: Two appearances in UEFA Champions League, ten appearances and one goal in UEFA Europa League)	1	0	0	26	1
Panathinaikos	Total		20	0	4	0	13	1	3	0	37	1
Career total			186	3	10	0	17	2	18	0	231	5

=== International ===
Appearances and goals by national team and year
National team	Year	Apps	Goals
United States	2018	2	0
United States	2019	0	0
United States	2020	0	0
United States	2021	0	0
United States	2022	2	0
Total		4	0

== Honors ==
Sporting Kansas City

- U.S. Open Cup: 2017

Panathinaikos

- Greek Cup: 2023–24

United States U20

- CONCACAF Under-20 Championship: 2017

Individual

- CONCACAF Under-20 Championship Best XI: 2017
- CONCACAF Under-20 Championship Golden Ball: 2017
