= Kevin Ellis (soccer, born 1991) =

American soccer player (born 1991)

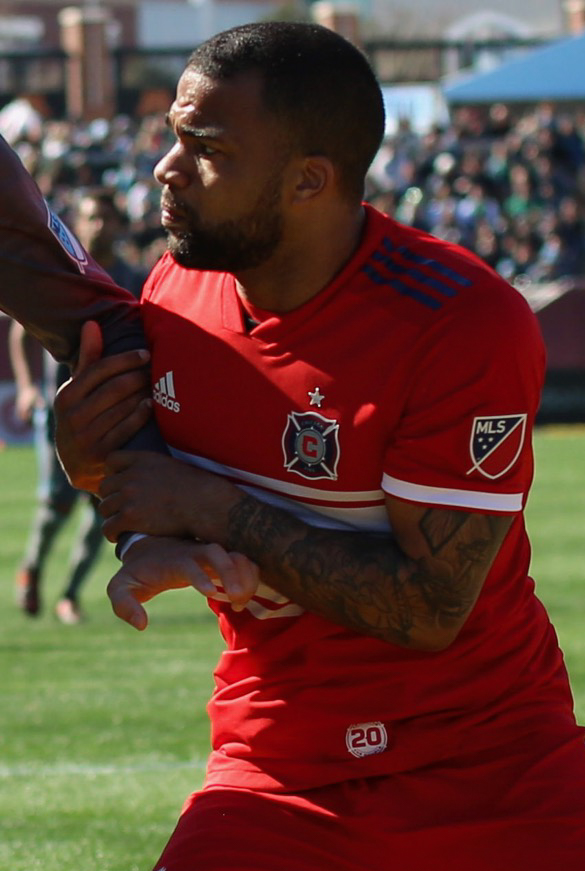

Personal information
- Full name: Kevin Ellis
- Date of birth: June 30, 1991 (age 35)
- Place of birth: Kansas City, Missouri, United States
- Height: 1.75 m (5 ft 9 in)
- Position: Defender

Team information
- Current team: St. Louis Ambush
- Number: 9

Youth career
- 2007–2009: Kansas City Wizards

College career
Years	Team	Apps	(Gls)
2009–2010	Barton Cougars		

Senior career*
Years	Team	Apps	(Gls)
2009	Kansas City Brass	3	(0)
2011–2017	Sporting Kansas City	68	(5)
2013	→ Orlando City (loan)	5	(0)
2014	→ Oklahoma City Energy (loan)	5	(0)
2016–2017	→ Swope Park Rangers (loan)	4	(0)
2018	Chicago Fire	20	(2)
2018	D.C. United	2	(0)
2019–2022	Kansas City Comets (indoor)	34	(36)
2022–	St. Louis Ambush (indoor)	3	(3)
- * Club domestic league appearances and goals as of 15 December 2022

Kevin Ellis (born Kevin Boydston; June 30, 1991) is an American professional soccer player who plays for the St. Louis Ambush in the Major Arena Soccer League.

== Career ==
=== Early career ===
Born in Kansas City, Missouri, as Kevin Boydston, Ellis first started to make a name for himself in the Sporting Kansas City Juniors with the under-17 side at the SUM Cup in 2007 where he started in every match for the Sporting juniors and scored two goals in two minutes against the FC Dallas juniors in the group final. Ellis then went on to attend Barton Community College where he played for the school's soccer team from 2009 to 2010. In 2009 Ellis scored 23 goals for Barton Community College while also earning NJCAA Second Team All-American honors. Then in 2010 Ellis was converted into a defender while still scoring 11 goals for the college team that season. After the 2010 season Ellis was named the Kansas Jayhawk Community College Conference Defensive Player of the Year, and he also added All-Region VI First Team, NJCAA All-Tournament Team and NJCAA First Team All-American honors to his personal honors. His 34 goals scored while at Barton Community College remain an all-time school record.

=== Sporting Kansas City ===
After the 2010 season, Ellis attended the Sporting Kansas City invitation-only combine in January 2011, where after the three-day combine he earned a spot with the Sporting Kansas City preseason roster. On February 18, after two weeks of training with the first team in preseason, Ellis was signed by Sporting Kansas City to a homegrown player contract. Ellis was the second homegrown signing by Sporting Kansas City after goalkeeper Jon Kempin, who signed as the first homegrown player in August 2010.

Ellis made his first-team debut for Sporting Kansas City on June 28, 2011, two days before his 20th birthday, against the Chicago Fire Premier in the US Open Cup, in which he came on as a 63rd-minute substitute for Kei Kamara. Sporting went on to win the game 3–0.

Ellis made his league debut in 2013 before spending several weeks on loan with Orlando City. He scored his first professional goal in a 1–0 victory over Cruz Azul during the 2013–14 CONCACAF Champions League quarterfinals.

Ellis was waived during the 2018 preseason. He later signed with the Chicago Fire on the eve of Chicago's season opener. He was waived by the Fire on August 9, 2018.

=== D.C. United ===
Ellis signed with D.C. United on September 7, 2018. Ellis played his first 90 minutes with DC in a friendly against C.D. Olimpia, contributing an assist to Dane Kelly. He was released by the club at the end of their 2018 season.

== Career statistics ==
As of December 31, 2014

Club	Season	League		MLS Cup		US Open Cup		CONCACAF		Total	
Club	Season	Apps	Goals	Apps	Goals	Apps	Goals	Apps	Goals	Apps	Goals
Sporting Kansas City	2011	0	0	0	0	1	0	0	0	1	0
Sporting Kansas City	2012	0	0	0	0	0	0	0	0	0	0
Sporting Kansas City	2013	2	0	0	0	1	0	2	1	5	1
Orlando City (loan)	2013	5	0	-	-	-	-	-	-	5	0
Sporting Kansas City	2014	20	0	0	0	2	0	1	0	23	0
Oklahoma City Energy FC (loan)	2014	4	0	-	-	-	-	-	-	4	0
Career total		61	10	0	0	4	0	3	1	38	1
