= Claudio Bieler =

Argentine footballer (born 1984)

Personal information
- Full name: Claudio Daniel Bieler
- Date of birth: March 1, 1984 (age 42)
- Place of birth: Vera, Santa Fe, Argentina
- Height: 1.79 m (5 ft 10 in)
- Position: Forward

Team information
- Current team: Huracán de Vera
- Number: 9

Youth career
- Colón

Senior career*
Years	Team	Apps	(Gls)
2005–2006	Colón	12	(0)
2006–2007	Atlético Rafaela	36	(16)
2007	Colo-Colo	15	(3)
2008–2009	LDU Quito	63	(35)
2010–2012	Racing Club	36	(8)
2011	→ Newell's Old Boys (loan)	13	(3)
2011–2012	→ LDU Quito (loan)	32	(18)
2012	LDU Quito	15	(4)
2013–2014	Sporting Kansas City	44	(13)
2015–2016	Quilmes	27	(14)
2016–2017	Belgrano	34	(6)
2017–2019	San Martín Tucumán	49	(20)
2019	Independiente del Valle	7	(1)
2020–2023	Atlético Rafaela	113	(46)
2024	Agropecuario	15	(3)
2024–	Huracán de Vera	8	(4)
- * Club domestic league appearances and goals as of 8 May 2025

Claudio Daniel Bieler (Spanish pronunciation: [ˈklawðjo ˈβjeleɾ]; born March 1, 1984) is an Argentine footballer who plays as a forward for Huracán de Vera.

== Club career ==
=== Rise in career ===
In 2005 Bieler made his professional debut with Primera División Argentina squad Colón de Santa Fe. The following year he was loaned to Primera B Nacional Argentina squad Atlético Rafaela, where he led the league with sixteen goals. In 2007, he caught the eye of fellow Argentine Claudio Borghi who signed him to Colo-Colo. Bieler attained the 2007 Clausura championship in Chile with Colo Colo.

=== LDU Quito ===
At LDU Quito, he built a reputation as a very capable striker. He was an integral part of the squad that won the 2008 Copa Libertadores (where he had a goal wrongfully disallowed for offsides in the final game) and the squad that was the runner-up of the 2008 FIFA Club World Cup. He was the team's top-scorer in 2008 with 17 goals, and was the Ecuadorian Serie A's top-scorer in 2009 with 22 goals. He provided the winning goal in Liga's win in the first leg of the 2009 Recopa Sudamericana and scored one of three goals in the second leg at home. In the 2009 Copa Sudamericana, he was the tournament's top-scorer with eight goals, including two hat-tricks against Argentine team Lanús and Uruguayan team River Plate.

He scored his first hat-trick for Serie A on February 12, 2012, in the match between LDU Quito and Olmedo, where LDU Quito won 5–0. He garnered interest from Mexican clubs, although he expressed his wish to retire with Liga de Quito.

=== Racing Club ===
On January 6, 2010 Racing Club de Avellaneda signed the striker to a three-and-a-half-year contract with 50% of the Bieler sporting rights.

=== Sporting Kansas City ===
Bieler signed with Sporting Kansas City of Major League Soccer as a designated player on December 18, 2012. Sporting paid an undisclosed transfer fee to LDU Quito to obtain Bieler.

Bieler was released by Kansas City on January 20, 2015.

=== Belgrano ===
On 6 January 2016 Bieler signed with CA Belgrano.

=== Last years ===
In the first half of 2024, Bieler played for Agropecuario. In October of the same year, he joined Huracán de Vera in the Torneo Regional Federal Amateur.

== International career ==
Due to his performance playing for LDU Quito, elements of the Ecuadorian press have suggested that Bieler should play for the Ecuador national team. When asked to comment on the remarks, he has publicly stated that he would change nationalities to play for Ecuador. On February 4, 2010, he was called up by Argentine manager Diego Maradona, but ended up not playing because of a suspected injury. In May 2010, Bieler returned to Ecuador to undergo the naturalization process. However, he is not eligible to play for the Ecuador national team.

== Honours ==
Colo-Colo

- Primera División de Chile (1): 2007 Clausura

LDU Quito

- Copa Libertadores (1): 2008
- Recopa Sudamericana (1): 2009
- Copa Sudamericana (1): 2009

Independiente del Valle

- Copa Sudamericana (1): 2019

Sporting Kansas City

- MLS Cup (1): 2013

== Personal life ==
Bieler became a citizen of Ecuador in 2011 since he is in a free union with Ecuadoran girlfriend.
