= Federico Bessone (footballer, born 1984) =

Argentine footballer

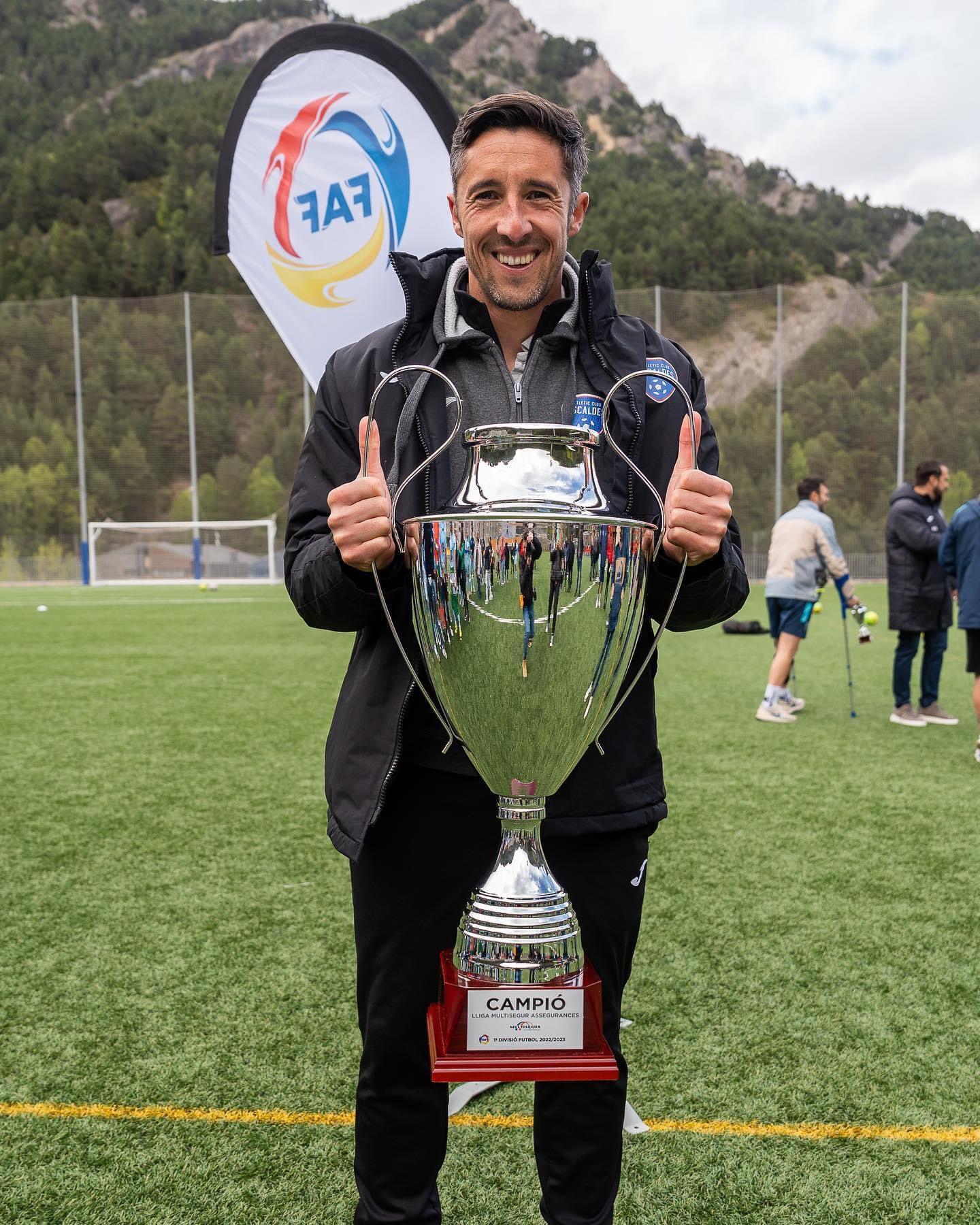

Personal information
- Full name: Federico Bessone Luna
- Date of birth: 23 January 1984 (age 42)
- Place of birth: Córdoba, Argentina
- Height: 1.79 m (5 ft 10 1/2 in)
- Position: Left back

Team information
- Current team: Osijek (manager)

Youth career
- 2001–2002: Barcelona

Senior career*
Years	Team	Apps	(Gls)
2002–2005	Barcelona C		
2005–2008	Espanyol B	34	(1)
2007–2008	→ Gimnàstic (loan)	10	(0)
2008–2010	Swansea City	36	(1)
2010–2011	Leeds United	6	(0)
2011	→ Charlton Athletic (loan)	13	(0)
2011–2012	Swansea City	1	(0)
2012	Swindon Town	5	(0)
2013	Oldham Athletic	0	(0)
2013	Sporting Kansas City	0	(0)
2014	Millwall	2	(0)
2016–2018	Prat	74	(1)
2019–2020	Andorra	16	(1)
2020–2021	IC d'Escaldes	4	(0)

Managerial career
- 2021–2022: IC d'Escaldes
- 2022–2023: Atlètic d'Escaldes
- 2023–2025: Santa Coloma
- 2025–2026: Olimpija Ljubljana
- 2026–: Osijek
- * Club domestic league appearances and goals

Federico Bessone Luna (born 23 January 1984), also known as Fede Bessone, is an Argentine football coach and former player who is the manager of Croatian club Osijek.

== Playing career ==
=== Early career ===
Born in Córdoba, Bessone spent four years as a youth player at Spanish club Barcelona, alongside Lionel Messi, who he had grown up with. He later played for Espanyol B and Gimnàstic.

=== Swansea City ===
Bessone moved from Espanyol B to Welsh team Swansea City in June 2008, on a free transfer. On 20 November 2009, Bessone scored his first goal for Swansea in a 1–0 win over League rivals Derby County, helping Swansea climb to third in the Championship, the highest position they had reached in over 26 years.

=== Move to England ===
After the 2009–10 season finished Bessone was offered a new deal at Swansea but turned it down in favour of joining Leeds United; he signed a three-year contract and became their fourth signing of the summer.

On 21 January 2011, Bessone moved to Charlton Athletic on a loan deal until the end of the season, with the option of a permanent transfer. In February 2011, Bessone gave an interview to the Yorkshire Evening Post where he admitted his performances for Leeds has been "opened to close scrutiny." In May 2011, Bessone was transfer listed by Leeds United, and he was linked with a move to Charlton. After failing to find a new club, Bessone returned to training with Leeds United in June 2011, and he was later named in their squad for a friendly tour of Scotland.

=== Return to Swansea ===
On 31 August 2011, Bessone had his contract with Leeds cancelled by mutual consent, and he re-joined Swansea that same day, to provide defensive cover for the injured Alan Tate. The transfer was initially delayed while awaiting international clearance from FIFA. Bessone only made one Premier League appearance in his second spell at Swansea, appearing as a late substitute against West Bromwich Albion.

=== Return to England ===
Bessone signed with Swindon Town on 31 August 2012,

Bessone signed with Oldham Athletic on 28 March 2013 for defensive cover as left back Jonathan Grounds was one yellow card away from a two match ban towards the end of the season. Bessone was released at the end of the season without playing a single game for the club.

=== United States ===
On 9 September 2013, Bessone signed with Sporting Kansas City of Major League Soccer. Out of contract, Bessone was released in January 2014 without playing a single game for the club.

=== Millwall ===
On 18 February 2014, he signed a short-term contract with Millwall.

=== AE Prat ===
For the 2016–17 season he returned to Spain with AE Prat.

=== FC Andorra ===
In December 2018 he signed for FC Andorra. He then signed for IC d'Escaldes.

== Coaching career ==
On 10 August 2021 Bessone was appointed manager of Inter Club d'Escaldes. He won the Andorran Supercup, but was sacked on 30 April 2021 after five winless games in a row with the team in the top spot of the league.

For the 2022–23 season Bessone was manager of Atlètic Club d'Escaldes. He guided the club to its first league title.

For the 2023–24 season Bessone joined FC Santa Coloma. With them, he knocked out Borac Banja Luka in the first round of the 2025-26 UEFA Conference League qualifying.

On 22 September 2025 he was appointed manager of Slovenian giants Olimpija Ljubljana.

Bessone left Olimpija at the end of 2025–26 season, having finished fourth in the Slovenian league championship. That same month, Bessone signed for the Croatian HNL side Osijek.

== Career statistics ==
As of 25 October 2016

Club	Season	League		Cup		League Cup		Other		Total	
Club	Season	Apps	Goals	Apps	Goals	Apps	Goals	Apps	Goals	Apps	Goals
Espanyol B	2006–07	34	1	–	–	–	–	–	–	34	1
Espanyol B	2007–08	0	0	–	–	–	–	–	–	0	0
Espanyol B	Total	34	1	–	–	–	–	–	–	34	1
Gimnàstic (loan)	2007–08	10	0	–	–	–	–	–	–	10	0
Gimnàstic (loan)	Total	10	0	–	–	–	–	–	–	10	0
Swansea City	2008–09	15	0	1	0	2	0	0	0	18	0
Swansea City	2009–10	21	1	0	0	1	0	0	0	22	1
Swansea City	2011–12	1	0	1	0	0	0	0	0	2	0
Swansea City	Total	37	1	2	0	3	0	0	0	42	1
Leeds United	2010–11	6	0	0	0	2	0	0	0	8	0
Charlton Athletic (loan)	2010–11	13	0	0	0	0	0	0	0	13	0
Swindon Town	2012–13	5	0	0	0	0	0	1	0	6	0
Oldham Athletic	2012–13	0	0	0	0	0	0	0	0	0	0
Kansas City	2013	0	0	0	0	0	0	0	0	0	0
Millwall	2013–14	1	0	0	0	0	0	0	0	1	0
AE Prat	2016–17	9	0	0	0	0	0	0	0	9	0
Career total		116	2	2	0	5	0	1	0	124	2

== Managerial statistics ==
As of 23 May 2026

Team	From	To	Record					
Team	From	To	G	W	D	L	Win %	Ref.
Inter Escaldes	10 August 2021	30 April 2022	27	15	8	4	55.56	
Atlètic Escaldes	1 July 2022	30 June 2023	32	18	7	7	56.25	
FC Santa Coloma	27 November 2023	21 September 2025	51	30	6	15	58.82	
Olimpija Ljubljana	22 September 2025	Present	29	15	6	8	51.72	
Total			139	78	27	34	56.12	—

== Honours ==
=== Manager ===
Inter Club d'Escaldes

- Andorran Supercup: 2021

Atlètic Escaldes

- Primera Divisió: 2022-23
