= Peterson Joseph =

Haitian footballer (born 1990)

Personal information
- Full name: Peterson Joseph
- Date of birth: April 24, 1990 (age 36)
- Place of birth: Port-au-Prince, Haiti
- Height: 5 ft 9 in (1.75 m)
- Position: Midfielder

Senior career*
Years	Team	Apps	(Gls)
2006–2009	Aigle Noir AC	?	(?)
2009–2011	Braga	0	(0)
2010–2011	→ Vizela (loan)	20	(1)
2011–2014	Sporting Kansas City	34	(0)
2016–2017	Sudeva Moonlight	4	(0)
2018–2020	Hang Yuen		
2020-2021	Tempête FC		(5)
2021–	Pèlerin FC		

International career
2006–2007	Haiti U17	6	(1)
2008–2013	Haiti	18	(0)
- * Club domestic league appearances and goals

Peterson Joseph (born 24 April 1990) is a Haitian professional footballer.

Known for having a soft touch on the ball and playing with quick one to two touch passes throughout the field, Joseph is known as the "Haitian Xavi".

== Club career ==
Joseph played for Haitian League side Aigle Noir AC before moving to Portuguese side SC Braga in the European mid-season transfer window. Joseph had a year-long loan spell with SC Braga's affiliate team FC Vizela, who were playing in the Portuguese Second Division at the time. Joseph was a member of the team that made it to the final of the UEFA Europa League.

Joseph joined Major League Soccer club Sporting Kansas City on September 1, 2011, and made his initial appearance with the club on October 1, 2011, in the 83rd minute against the San Jose Earthquakes. In 2012, he was a member of the team that won the U.S. Open Cup. A year later, he won the 2013 MLS Championship. He stayed with the club for three years in total before his contract was terminated on August 11, 2014.

After unsuccessful trials in Tanzania and Malaysia, he signed with Delhi Premier League club Sudeva Moonlight on October 1, 2016. After stints at Hang Yuen and Tempête FC, Joseph joined Pèlerin FC in 2021.

== International career ==
Joseph played for Haiti at the 2007 CONCACAF U17 Tournament and the 2007 FIFA U-17 World Cup, before making his debut for the full senior Haitiian national team in 2008. Joseph appear in 2010 FIFA World Cup Qualifier, Caribbean Cup 2012, Gold Cup 2013 and friendlies apparitions on numerous occasions.
