= 2010 Kansas City Wizards season =

Kansas City Wizards
2010 season
- President: Robb Heineman
- Head coach: Peter Vermes
- Major League Soccer: East: 3rd Overall: 9th
- U.S. Open Cup: Qualification Semifinals
- Top goalscorer: League: Kei Kamara (10); All: Kei Kamara (10)
| Home colors | Away colors |

The 2010 Kansas City Wizards season was the club's 15th season since its establishment in 1995. The club participated in the MLS for the 15th time, and in the U.S. Open Cup for the 14th time. Local television broadcast rights were held by KCWE in the first year of a four-year deal. Every home and away match for the league season was available on local over-the-air high definition. On January 20, the club broke ground on their future stadium.

== Review ==
=== Preseason ===
The club decided to travel to Arizona for preseason training after opening camp in cold Kansas City. As promised by the front office in the off-season, the club brought in a large number of trialist and draft picks to fight for the limited squad positions. Much of the preseason banter surrounded the departure of the Latin striker Claudio Lopez and the contract status of goalkeeper Kevin Hartman. Hartman's situation was used as an example against the collective bargaining agreement between the league and the players' union however Hartman was replaced by Danish goalkeeper Jimmy Nielsen. In addition to all the player movement, the Wizards found themselves winners in a weighted allocation lottery for the services of US Youth player 16-year-old Luis Gil. Despite "winning" the lottery, speculation was that the league had agreed the youngster would be placed somewhere on the west coast and he was quickly traded to Real Salt Lake for a second round draft pick, future transfer consideration, and a Senior International roster spot.

=== March (1–0–0) 3 points ===
Ryan Smith made his introduction to the club and the league in the Wizards opener, an emphatic 4-nil win over D.C. United. Kei Kamara opened his account slamming home a rebound from a Smith shot on Troy Perkins' goal. Davy Arnaud doubled the lead in the first half with Smith, earning the assist. Despite being an official "sell-out", the weather kept a large number of fans from seeing new goalkeeper Jimmy Nielsen make his debut. Nielsen was tested only the one time by the all-time league-leading goal scorer, Jaime Moreno, but the Danish keeper nicknamed "White Puma" responded properly and kept his sheet clean. The second half opened similarly to the first half as Smith got his first goal of the season, passing another rebound into an open net, this time in front of The Cauldron. 15 minutes later, Smith's corner intended for Kamara found instead the hand of a defender and referee Kevin Stott pointed to the spot; Jack Jewsbury (late entry to starting eleven) made the best of the situation and gave the home squad a 4-goal lead.

Off the field

Hours before the season opener, the Wizards organization invited a group of season ticket holders to tour the construction site of the new stadium. Tactically, the club hid the formation they planned to play often, letting people believe they were playing a 4–4–2 when in fact Peter Vermes had installed a new hybrid 4–5–1 and 4–3–3 formation. Birahim Diop and Chance Myers were both intended to be in the starting eleven to open the season; however, both became injured and were replaced with Jack Jewsbury and Kei Kamara, who would both make the most of their chances and earn the starting positions. In addition to all the roster changes, Indian footballer Sunil Chhetri was added to the club very late in March despite not having an open roster spot available. The Chhetri signing brought so much attention to the club from India that the Wizards held a video press conference for the reporters in India.

=== April (1–1–1) 4 points ===
With no league match scheduled for the second week the Wizards visited their new cross state rival AC St. Louis. The friendly was part of a doubleheader planned to pit the Swope Park Rangers versus University of Evansville and Wizards v Saint Louis. In the opener the newest striker Sunil Chhetri struck for a hat trick against the amateur Evansville Purple Aces leading to a 5–0 victory. The Wizards fielded a weaken side for the second match but still came out ahead 2–1 thanks to a late Santiago Hirsig winner, more importantly though was the loss of backup center forward Zoltán whose ACL was torn and is expected to miss five-to-eight months. The striker was placed on the injured reserve list allowing Chhetri to join the roster without having to move another player.

Colorado became the second visitors to CommunityAmerica Ballpark in 2010 as well staying to open the 2010 U.S. Open Cup later in the week at Stanley H. Durwood Soccer Stadium on the downtown campus of UMKC. The league match-up was hindered by harsh fouls and questionable officiating yet Kei Kamara scored the lone goal and winner off the boot of Ryan Smith from a long distance free kick. Colorado defender Julien Baudet was sent off in the 72nd minute and despite having one of the deadliest strike duos in the league the Rapids didn't trouble Jimmy Nielsen. The Open Cup match started with Teal Bunbury scoring his first professional goal but it would prove to not be enough as Rapids midfielder Wells Thompson would net a Brace ending the Open Cup run before it had even started.

Traveling to Seattle has proven tough for most clubs in the league, but Kansas City handed the Sounders their first ever home loss in 2009 and appeared ready to duplicate that result. In their first away match of the season the Wizards invited pressure early and it nearly cost them as the Sounders had a handful of half chances in the opening minutes. Young Colombian standout Freddy Montero was denied on the doorstep by the strong right hand of Jimmy Nielsen which marked the end of the Seattle pressure and ushered in Kansas City's possession for the remainder of the first half. Frustrated and maligned James Riley first and Steve Zakuani later picked up careless yellow cards and Swedish International Freddie Ljungberg was held without incident for much of the match. Jimmy Conrad was forced out of the match with injury which left the KC backline lacking age and experience; Harrington (24), Besler (23), Escobar (23), and Espinoza (23). Enjoying much of the ball the Wizards could only muster two shots on goal out of nine, despite having 19 in their first two matches. Ryan Smith and the Wizards created nine corners and nine shots to Seattle's two corners and five shots however the Sounders second shot on goal came in the 92nd minute and found the netting despite an apparent illegal throw-in. Making only his second professional appearance Michael Fucito came on in the 85th minute and got on the end of a throw in from fellow substitute Brad Evans winning the game 1–0. Chance Myers had an immediate counterattack but failed to beat goalkeeper Kasey Keller one-on-one.

Landon Donovan and The Galaxy brought in their perfect 12 points and Edson Buddle's league leading seven goals to face the stingy defense of the Wizards. To the dismay of neutrals and supporters alike the weather affected the match as the Kansas City area saw hours and hours rain previous and during the match. Both clubs had trouble holding the ball and at times it looked more like a tennis match but Kansas City did have the better of chances despite the match ending in a scoreless draw. Jimmy Nielsen and Donovan Ricketts would take home most of the accolades and Kei Kamara the scapegoating, Kamara botched a sitter in the first half.

Off the Field

April's Fools! at Michael Harrington's expense. The premise of the stunt was that Maxim was doing an animal themed photo-shoot for a future article, this prank resulted in national coverage as it appeared on numerous outlets including SportsCenter. Before the second home game against Colorado another ceremony was planned for the fans, this time allowing them to sign the first beam of steel in the new stadium.

Cauldron Man of the Month
Jimmy Nielsen

=== May (0–4–1) 1 point ===
Following the encouraging result against LA, the club appeared poised to pick up some points on a quick two city road trip to Houston and the nation's capital, where pointless D.C. United awaited, while both road match ups and the subsequent home match on May 15 would all be on national television where the side has struggled in recent seasons. Wizards starting centerback Jimmy Conrad couldn't pass a pregame fitness test and the young backline who held the league leading Galaxy offense scoreless seemed ready to handle a club missing their starting forward Brian Ching. The young Wizards lost the plot quickly and the Dyanmo jumped them as Matt Besler picked up a quick yellow and the disappointing young Mexican strike Luis Ángel Landín gave the home side an early lead, the goal was only his second since joining the club as a Designated Player and both have come against KC at Robertson Stadium. Wizards captain Davy Arnaud was sent off for only the second time in his eight years after making contact with the goalkeeper and the club never recovered in the heat and humidity as the Texan side cruised to a 3 – nil victory.

After being skunked in the league opener the Black-and-Red had been shutout in four of five matches and had managed zero points while scoring only two goals and conceding a total of 13. Even without the services of captain Arnaud and veteran Conrad the club looked favorites in the ESPN2 MLS Game of the Week. In an attempt to shake things up and to aid in the wary legs from playing a man down just days earlier Peter Vermes gave Santiago Hirsig and Chance Myers each their first starts of the season, neither of which made the desired impact and were both subbed by the 51st minute. Australian international Danny Allsopp provided a first half brace while 19-year-old Bill Hamid made his professional debut earning him a league record as the youngest goalkeeper to ever register a win at just 19 years 161 days, besting Tim Howard's record by four days. Hamid was stunning in his appearance making five saves, the biggest denying Jack Jewsbury directly before halftime. The Wizards created more chances but their finishing aim let them down again as they recorded 14 shots and only a single tally that came very late when substitute and team goal leader Kei Kamara spoiled the clean sheet in the 92nd minute.

Another struggling Eastern Conference foe would find a point off of the Wizards when the Chicago Fire came calling on another rainy Kansas City Saturday night. The club followed their 2010 script perfectly as they outshot the Fire 18–8 (10–6 on net) while holding a commanding double digit corner kick advantage 11–1 but as in many of the earlier games the Wizards simply could not get the ball around Chicago goal keeper Andrew Dykstra who ended the match with eight saves. Julio Martínez put the visitors ahead in the 14th minute and former US International Brian McBride doubled the lead straight out of halftime. Davy Arnaud would have a goal called back and several KC shots hit woodwork before Kei Kamara pulled one back only two minutes after the lead was doubled. Much of the second half would be played in the Wizards final third but the equalizer wouldn't come until Kamara tapped in a deflected shot from Teal Bunbury in the 89th minute, despite increased pressure the homeside would not find a magical stoppage time winner and was forced to live with splitting the points.

May was shaping up to be a decidedly bad month for the club when undefeated Columbus (5–0–2) made their lone appearance to the CAB. The Crew left home earlier in the week trailing only the surprising Red Bulls in the East but after dispatching New York 3–1 at Red Bull Arena the yellow clad warriors looked unstoppable. Eddie Gaven put himself in a position to break the scoreless draw in the 10th minute as he went 1v1 with Kansas City keeper Jimmy Nielsen but the Dane was up to the task first getting a foot to the shot and then falling directly on top of the rebound (Nielsen won Save of the Week for this save). The first half frustration came to a head just before half time when captain Arnuad hit the left upright after an inspiring built up from Graham Zusi and the lay off from Kei Kamara. The opening 20 minutes of the second half saw the Wizards outshoot the Crew 7–1 of those seven shots, two easily handled Ryan Smith muffs, a Zusi screamer that went just wide, a Jewsbury rocket that had Will Hesmer beaten if on frame, Bunbury shot off target, and a Kamara turn from the top of the circle plus his header from within six yards that found its way over the cross bar- The Columbus shot in those 20 minutes, Emilio Rentería's game winning header off of a corner kick taken by 2008 MLS MVP winner Guillermo Barros Schelotto. The home loss meant the club had not registered a win in seven straight matches dating back to the April 10 1-nil win over Colorado.

Defending MLS Cup holders RSL rounded out a terrible month of May. Salt Lake had won four straight league matches and was undefeated at Rio Tinto Stadium while out scoring their opponents 14–4 over the month, Kansas City on the other hand finished May 0–4–1 while netting four and leaking 12. There would be no surprises in this one as RSL rolled 4–1 and Wizards Captain Davy Arnuad received his second red card of the season and third of his career. Jimmy Nielsen was once again up for Save of the Week.

Off the Field
Wizards players Kei Kamara and Sunil Chhetri each got to visit Kansas Speedway with Kei running a few laps at nearly 200 MPH and Sunil visiting with his fellow countryman Narain Karthikeyan and wishes him luck in this video. The biggest news of the month came when KC Wizards announced the international friendly with Manchester United to be played July 25 at the newly renovated Arrowhead Stadium. Wizards President Robb Heineman was privately disciplined by the league for this tweet using the social networking tool Twitter. The White Puma won Save of the Week for his week 9 save against Eddie Gaven and was nominated again in week 10.

Cauldron Man of the Month
Kei Kamara

=== June (1–1–1) 4 points ===
After a month of bad football most Wizards fans were very critical of the coaching staff and the plays by the club. Things didn't appear to get any easier to start June as the schedule read a quick trip up to Toronto to face the Surging Reds who were enjoying their best start to a season in club history. They had tallied 12 of 12 home points and riding a four match unbeaten streak that consisted of three victories and one very impressive scoreless draw at Home Depot Center against the unstoppable Galaxy. Jimmy Nielsen kept the Wiz in the match long enough to allow referee Baldomero Toledo to send off TFC Defender Nick Garcia in the 27th minute. For the remainder of the first half the visitors enjoyed some attacking football but couldn't break down the defense and would have to settle for going to half up a man and even on the score sheet. Toledo's performance in the middle would be questioned by both sides before the game ended and in the 57th minute Craig Rocastle put himself in a position to be sent off and Toledo granted him the wish. The match would end scoreless with ten a side in what would repeatedly be called an uninspired performance by both sides but the point earned was the first road point for the club in 2010.

Expansion side Philadelphia Union brought the worse statistical defense in the league and cured the Kansas City streak of eight matches without a win. Kei Kamara scored his team leading sixth goal (which won MLS Goal of the Week) early in the first half thanks in large part to Ryan Smith's picture perfect pass, Smith then feed Graham Zusi another slick ball to put him behind the backline and the second year backup slotted home his first professional goal. Philadelphia center back Michael Orozco Fiscal received a red card late in the first half which caused the Union to pack men behind the ball and created an incredibly boring second half. This was the final game for the league before the international break structured into the season for the 2010 FIFA World Cup.

After sixteen days off the Wizards got back into league play hosting New York Red Bulls at CAB. Many of the supporters were disappointed after watching the USMNT crash out of the World Cup earlier in the day and then watch the home side get slammed 3–0. This match was marred by two poor performances, first by reserve center back Aaron Hohlbein and second the otherwise outstanding Jimmy Nielsen. To add to the disgrace the club captain Davy Arnaud picked up his third red card of the season in the 93rd minute causing a large number of supporters to call for him to lose the armband.

Off the Field
The Club released another stadium update video. In connection with the FIFA World Cup the club announced their intentions to host a watch party for all 64 matches at the Kansas City Live living room at the highly visible Kansas City Power & Light District. On June 24 Wizards President Robb Heineman indicated via BigSoccer that the club had tendered a Designated Player contract to Icelandic striker Eiður Guðjohnsen and they believed that Tottenham Hotspur F.C. was also interested in the former Chelsea F.C. and FC Barcelona forward. Also on the same day as news of Gudjohnsen's offer, came word that ESPN planned to use the Wizards World Cup watch party as a cut away location for the United States versus Ghana second round match. Kei Kamara won Goal of the Week for week 12 thanks to his goal on June 10 against Philadelphia. Nielsen won Save of the Week for week 13 because of his performance against New York on June 26.

Cauldron Man of the Month
Michael Harrington

=== July (2–2–1) 7 points ===
Manager Peter Vermes opened July by tinkering with the formation while trying to get anything out of the offense. A visit to Dallas in the summer of 2009 resulted in then-manager Curt Onalfo being dismissed following a 6–0 thumping, and heading into this match Dallas was riding a two-game win streak and looked every bit capable of running away with another lopsided win. The first half saw KC not get a single shot as they looked more willing to defend and play for a scoreless draw until Colombian attacking midfielder David Ferreira unlocked the Kansas City defense. Dallas then coasted to the 1–0 victory at home.

Wizards returned home to face the Western Conference's last place team Chivas USA. Everyone has seen matches where one team deserves to win and in the end doesn't, as an example KC lead in corner kicks 14–1 and shots 20–8 yet were defeated 2–0 thanks to Justin Braun finding the net on two mistakes by center back Jimmy Conrad. To round out his poor performance Conrad then went on to pick up a yellow card in the 81st minute as many home supporters left the grounds early. This match appeared to break the backs of many fans and there was much talk about Peter Vermes dismissal but it never came and the club went on the road hoping to end a three-game scoreless streak.

In a vast reversal Kansas City edged out The East Leading Crew in Columbus while riding the back of goal keeper Jimmy Nielsen (and his fourth Save of the Week win) and Rookie Teal Bunbury's first professional goal. Columbus out shot the Wizards 19–8 and lead in corners 8–1 while being denied by the Puma seven times. Late in the match Bunbury had a second break away opportunity where Crew keeper and former Kansas City back up Will Hesmer forced him wide and then made an amazing save on Graham Zusi's headed shot after Teal crossed it deftly (nominated for Save of the Week). The away win was the club's first of the season, it snapped both three game scoreless and losing streaks. Nielsen had two saves from this match nominated for Save of the Week.

Skipper Davy Arnaud got the Wizards out to another fast start by beating Rapids keeper Matt Pickens early in the first half on another break away. For the second straight match Teal Bunbury teamed up top with Smith and Kamara and his on ball strength and threat of splitting the opponents center backs made for another strong respected performance. Colorado chased the game the entire first half and were extremely lucky to only be trailing 1-nil at half thanks in large part to Pickens making a blind kick save off of a Kamara shot and then stopping the stinging rebound of Arnaud (nominated for Save of the Week). The Rapids most fortunate play in the first half came as Bunbury held the ball outside the 18' and then deftly turned and sent a rocket that beat Pickens but then hit the right post and hugged the line until it struck the left upright and came back to the spot where Kamara's rebound attempt was foiled by a defender. Kansas City never got a clear chance in the second half yet they defended well until the 74th minute when Conor Casey equalized on the only shot on goal the home team got all night long. Recently brought in Shavar Thomas was responsible for allowing Casey to turn and shoot but Jimmy Nielsen reacted poorly and should have denied Casey of his team leading seventh goal, in addition to the equalizer Casey had clear chance to win the match late on but missed an open net- putting the ball off the upright and across the byline.

In front of a Kansas City record 52,424 fans the Wizards beat English Superclub Manchester United. Peter Vermes kept the same starting eleven who had sparked the recent good form and it paid dividends immediately as the Wizards pressured high and got stuck in versus the Red Devils. In just the eleventh minute the home side would push ahead as Davy Arnaud was kept onsides by a lazy and slow moving Rafael and he easily tallied past backup Ben Amos. Like they had in the opening moments the club would keep creating serious chances throughout the first half with Teal Bunbury, Kei Kamara, and Englishman Ryan Smith all having good goes of it. While the Wizards were creating chances United was countering with only half chances until Jimmy Nielsen stopped a point blank attempt with his belly and the Wizards were forced onto their back foot, which is where they found themselves in the 39th minute when Ryan Giggs slipped Dimitar Berbatov between the KC centerbacks. Jimmy Conrad found himself a full step behind and on the wrong side of the Bulgarian striker but still made a play for the ball, he got man instead and the penalty was given by American Referee Terry Vaughn- who also gave Conrad an ejection. Berbatov's hesitation step sent Nielsen diving the wrong direction and he easily equalized the exhibition match. Just one minute later Kansas City's leading assist maker Smith crossed a corner into and off of leading scorer Kamara's head that gave the now ten man home side the lead once again. Manchester United fought for the equalizer playing all their starters until the 68th minute and Alex Ferguson decided to even keep playing Giggs and fellow Red Devil legend Paul Scholes the full 90 minutes but the Major League Soccer outfit held their lines and won the match 2–1.

Returning to league play on the final day of July meant welcoming the third place (in the east) Toronto FC to the ballpark. The visitors came in a little off form and bogged down from fixture congestion in addition to a mistake make in customs that left the side without their match gear. Both sides looked affected by the extreme heat and played rather sloppy for most of the match. Recently acquired Spanish forward Mista had the best chance in the first half when he got through to Jimmy Nielsen alone but was spoiled by the right hand of the white puma. Neither club looked very dangerous as combined they totaled 20 shots; only 5 on goal yet rookie Teal Bunbury took advantage of a mistake in the back and headed a bouncing ball over Stefan Frei for the only goal of the match. Ryan Smith was taken off hurt in the first half, but before, he missed a good scoring chance and Birahim Diop also missed for the home side late in the second half with a chance to send the Canadians home before the whistle, however he mishit the ball and the result was a roller to the keeper. The seven points earned in July were the most of any month to date.

Off the Field
The club released disappointing Colombian center back Pablo Andrés Escobar after rumors of poor effort and development. Escobar was replaced by former Kansas City player Shavar Thomas who was reacquired in a trade with Philadelphia on July 2. Jimmy Nielsen won his third Save of the Week of the season and second straight with his play at Dallas on July 3 and his fourth just two weeks later thanks to his play versus Columbus. The club continued an attempt at stabilizing their center defense by signing Greek Nick Kounenakis just a few matches after inserting Thomas into the lineup. With Eiður Guðjohnsen apparently off the table and staying in England the club turned its DP focus onto another international striker, Omar Bravo. The Mexican International is a legendary hero of Club Deportivo Guadalajara (Chivas) as the club's second highest all time goal scorer (106) having played nearly 300 matches over a decade of service. Bravo has scored 15 times for his country, never against the United States, and El Tri has never lost a match in which he has scored- (12–0–1).

Cauldron Man of the Month
Teal Bunbury

=== October ===
The Wizards have managed to stay 3rd in the MLS Eastern Conference with playoff hopes. The team to jump ahead in order to clinch the last wild card spot are the Colorado Rapids. With a game at hand, the Wiz need 6 points from their last two games (vs. NE Rev and vs. SJ Quakes) and Colorado to drop points for a spot in the playoffs.

== Match results ==
Win Tie Loss

=== Preseason ===
| February 6, 2010 | Arizona Sahuaros | 0–5 | Kansas City Wizards | Phoenix, Arizona |
| 8:00 PM | | | Josh Wolff 6' 9'; Zoltán Hercegfalvi 10'; Mauro Fuzetti 16'; Alexei Casian 77' | Stadium: Grand Canyon University |

| February 10, 2010 | Kansas City Wizards | 3–0 | San Jose Earthquakes | Phoenix, Arizona |
| 12:00 PM | Kei Kamara 22' 26' 30' | | | Stadium: Reach 11 Sports Complex |

| February 13, 2010 | San Jose Earthquakes | 1–0 | Kansas City Wizards | Tempe, Arizona |
| 12:00 PM | Eduardo 2' | | | Stadium: Arizona State University |

| February 24, 2010 | Kansas City Wizards | 1–1 | Chivas USA | Phoenix, Arizona |
| 12:00 PM | Josh Wolff | | Mariano Trujillo | Stadium: Reach 11 Sports Complex |

| February 26, 2010 | Kansas City Wizards | 0–1 | Los Angeles Galaxy | Phoenix, Arizona |
| | | | Gregg Berhalter | Stadium: Reach 11 Sports Complex |

| March 4, 2010 | Kansas City Wizards | 1–1 | Columbus Crew | Phoenix, Arizona |
| 12:00 PM | Davy Arnaud (penalty missed); Graham Zusi 75' | | Brian Carrol 18' | Stadium: Reach 11 Sports Complex |

| March 7, 2010 | Kansas City Wizards | 4–0 | Arizona Sahuaros / GC University | Phoenix, Arizona |
| 12:00 PM | Teal Bunbury; Ryan Smith | | | Stadium: Reach 11 Sports Complex |

| March 11, 2010 | White | 5–2 | Blue | Kansas City, Kansas |
| 7:30 PM | Chance Myers 9' 54'; Josh Wolff 13' 74' (pen.); Ryan Smith 57' | | Kei Kamara 72'; Teal Bunbury 86' | Stadium: CommunityAmerica Ballpark |

| March 16, 2010 | Kansas City Wizards | 7–0 | UMKC | Kansas City, Kansas |
| 7:00 PM | Ryan Smith; Stéphane Auvray; Davy Arnaud; Jonathan Leathers; Zoltán Hercegfalvi; Teal Bunbury; Santiago Hirsig | | | Stadium: CommunityAmerica Ballpark |

| March 19, 2010 | Kansas City Wizards | 2–0 | UMKC | Kansas City, Missouri |
| 3:00 PM | Kei Kamara (pen.) | | | Stadium: Swope Park |

| March 19, 2010 | Kansas City Wizards | 2–0 | A.C. St. Louis | Kansas City, Missouri |
| 5:00 PM | Craig Rocastle; Chance Myers | | | Stadium: Swope Park |

| April 3, 2010 | AC St. Louis | 1–2 | Kansas City Wizards | St. Louis, Missouri |
| 7:00 PM | Kafedžić 53' | Report | Hercegfalvi 31'; Besler (yellow card) 34'; Hirsig 84' | Stadium: Anheuser-Busch Soccer Park; Attendance: 2,950; Referee: Landis Wiley |

=== MLS regular season ===
| March 27, 2010 | Kansas City Wizards | 4–0 | D.C. United | Kansas City, Kansas |
| 7:30PM | Kamara 9' (yellow card) 82'; Arnaud 35'; Smith 54'; Jewsbury 70' (pen.) | Report | Jakovic (yellow card) 26'; Morsink (yellow card) 28'; Quaranta (yellow card) 45+'; James (yellow card) 61'; Moreno (yellow card) 67' | Stadium: CommunityAmerica Ballpark; Attendance: 10,385; Referee: Kevin Stott |

| April 10, 2010 | Kansas City Wizards | 1–0 | Colorado Rapids | Kansas City, Kansas |
| 7:30PM | Kamara (yellow card) 39' (goal) 48'; Smith (yellow card) 45' | Report | Baudet (yellow card) 43' (red card) 72'; Mastroeni (yellow card) 44' | Stadium: CommunityAmerica Ballpark; Attendance: 10,228; Referee: Landis Wiley |

| April 17, 2010 | Seattle Sounders FC | 1–0 | Kansas City Wizards | Seattle, Washington |
| 2:00PM | Riley (yellow card) 29'; Zakuani (yellow card) 37'; Evans (yellow card) 90'; Fucito 90+2' | report | Auvray (yellow card) 72' | Stadium: Qwest Field; Attendance: 35,924; Referee: Jair Marrufo |

| April 24, 2010 | Kansas City Wizards | 0–0 | Los Angeles Galaxy | Kansas City, Kansas |
| 7:30PM | Arnaud (yellow card) 74' | report | Juninho (yellow card) 35'; Birchall (yellow card) 57'; Buddle (yellow card) 90+4' | Stadium: CommunityAmerica Ballpark; Attendance: 10,045; Referee: Alex Prus |

| May 1, 2010 | Houston Dynamo | 3–0 | Kansas City Wizards | Houston, Texas |
| 7:30PM | Landin 24'; Mullan 52'; Palmer (yellow card) 64'; Appiah 87' | report | Besler (yellow card) 16'; Arnaud (red card) 33'; Auvray (yellow card) 56'; Rocastle (yellow card) 70' | Stadium: Robertson Stadium; Attendance: 16,042; Referee: Terry Vaughn |

| May 5, 2010 | D.C. United | 2–1 | Kansas City Wizards | Washington, D.C. |
| 6:00PM | Allsopp 12' 34' | report | Kamara 92' | Stadium: RFK Stadium; Attendance: 10,038; Referee: Alex Prus |

| May 15, 2010 | Kansas City Wizards | 2–2 | Chicago Fire | Kansas City, Kansas |
| 7:30PM | Jewsbury (yellow card) 32'; Espinoza (yellow card) 45'; Kamara 50' 89'; Escobar (yellow card) 64'; Conrad (yellow card) 70' | report | Martínez 14'; Robinson (yellow card) 45'; McBride 48'; Krol (yellow card) 63' | Stadium: CommunityAmerica Ballpark; Attendance: 8,155; Referee: Michael Kennedy |

| May 23, 2010 | Kansas City Wizards | 0–1 | Columbus Crew | Kansas City, Kansas |
| 3:00PM | Smith (yellow card) 35'; Rocastle (yellow card) 90' | report | Ekpo (yellow card) 44'; Padula (yellow card) 56'; Renteria 64'; Hesmer (yellow card) 89' | Stadium: CommunityAmerica Ballpark; Attendance: 10,385; Referee: Alejandro Mariscal |

| May 29, 2010 | Real Salt Lake | 4–1 | Kansas City Wizards | Sandy, Utah |
| 8:00PM | Olave (yellow card) 29'; Espíndola 31'; Saborío 34'; Russell 84'; Grabavoy 92+' | Report | Besler (yellow card) 27'; Kamara (yellow card) 32'; Wolff 42'; Conrad (yellow card) 73'; Arnaud (yellow card) 82' (yellow-red card) 82' | Stadium: Rio Tinto Stadium; Attendance: 15,588; Referee: Ricardo Salazar |

| June 5, 2010 | Toronto FC | 0–0 | Kansas City Wizards | Toronto, Ontario, Canada |
| | Garcia (red card) 27'; De Rosario (yellow card) 46+' | (report) | Rocastle (yellow card) 35' (yellow-red card) 57' | Stadium: BMO Field; Attendance: 21,583; Referee: Baldomero Toledo |

| June 10, 2010 | Kansas City Wizards | 2–0 | Philadelphia Union | Kansas City, Kansas |
| 7:00 CT | Kamara 9'; Jewsbury (yellow card) 28'; Zusi 35'; Wolff (yellow card) 52'; Harrington (yellow card) 78' | Report | Orozco Fiscal (yellow card) 26' (yellow-red card) 42'; Arrieta (yellow card) 74' | Stadium: CommunityAmerica Ballpark; Attendance: 10,176; Referee: Alex Prus |

| June 26, 2010 | Kansas City Wizards | 0–3 | New York Red Bulls | Kansas City, Kansas |
| 7:30pm CT | Conrad (yellow card) 43'; Zusi (yellow card) 79'; Arnaud (red card) 90+3' | (Report) | Lindpere (yellow card) 43'; Ibrahim 55'; Ángel 82' 90' | Stadium: CommunityAmerica Ballpark; Attendance: 10,385; Referee: Ricardo Salazar |

| July 3, 2010 | FC Dallas | 1–0 | Kansas City Wizards | Frisco, Texas |
| | Ferreira 58' | Report | Rocastle (yellow card) 60'; Espinoza (yellow card) 63' | Stadium: Pizza Hut Park; Attendance: 15,993; Referee: Ramón Hernández |

| July 10, 2010 | Kansas City Wizards | 0–2 | Chivas USA | Kansas City, Kansas |
| | Jimmy Conrad (yellow card) 81' | report | Braun 56', 87'; Osael Romero (yellow card) 74' | Stadium: CommunityAmerica Ballpark; Attendance: 10,288; Referee: Hilario Grajeda |

| July 14, 2010 | Columbus Crew | 0–1 | Kansas City Wizards | Columbus, Ohio |
| | Hejduk (yellow card) 40' | report | Bunbury 14' | Stadium: Crew Stadium; Attendance: 11,304; Referee: Steven DePiero |

| July 17, 2010 | Colorado Rapids | 1–1 | Kansas City Wizards | Commerce City, Colorado |
| | Palguta (yellow card) 36'; Casey 74' | report | Arnaud 20'; Kamara (yellow card) 43' | Stadium: Dick's Sporting Goods Park; Attendance: 12,825; Referee: Michael Kennedy |

| July 31, 2010 | Kansas City Wizards | 1–0 | Toronto FC | Kansas City, Kansas |
| | Bunbury 62'; Bunbury (yellow card) 68' | (report) | Cann (yellow card) 22'; LaBrocca (yellow card) 86' | Stadium: CommunityAmerica Ballpark; Attendance: 10,385; Referee: Abiodun Okulaja |

| August 7, 2010 | Kansas City Wizards | 1–1 | Real Salt Lake | Kansas City, Kansas |
| | Kamara 21'; Smith (yellow card) 29'; Bunbury (yellow card) 71' | Report | Morales (yellow card) 22'; Johnson (yellow card) 31'; Findley 33'; Borchers (yellow card) 41'; Grabavoy (yellow card) 61' | Stadium: CommunityAmerica Ballpark; Attendance: 10,385; Referee: Paul Ward |

| August 14, 2010 | San Jose Earthquakes | 1–0 | Kansas City Wizards | Santa Clara, California |
| 7:00 PM PDT | Convey (yellow card) 24'; Wondolowski 35'; Alvarez (yellow card) 59'; Hernandez (red card) 88' | Report | Conrad (yellow card) 66' | Stadium: Buck Shaw Stadium; Attendance: 8,619 |

| August 21, 2010 | Kansas City Wizards | 4–1 | New England Revolution | Kansas City, Kansas |
| 7:30 PM CDT | Diop 16' 27'; Kamara 65'; Jewsbury 69' | Report | Mansally 37'; Joseph (yellow card) 44'; Nyassi (yellow card) 74' | Stadium: CommunityAmerica Ballpark; Attendance: 10,385; Referee: Ricardo Salazar |

| August 28, 2010 | Los Angeles Galaxy | 0–2 | Kansas City Wizards | Carson, California |
| | Birchall (yellow card) 68' | Report | Arnaud 12'; Conrad 70'; Nielsen (yellow card) 91' | Stadium: The Home Depot Center; Attendance: 20,112; Referee: Yeder Reyes |

| September 4, 2010 | Philadelphia Union | 1–1 | Kansas City Wizards | Chester, Pennsylvania |
| 3:30 ET | Le Toux 33'; Orozco Fiscal (yellow card) 71' | Report | Espinoza (yellow card) 64'; Arnaud 69' | Stadium: PPL Park; Attendance: 17,182; Referee: Ramón Hernández |

| September 19, 2010 | Chivas USA | 0–2 | Kansas City Wizards | Carson, California |
| | Trujillo (yellow card) 54'; Umaña (yellow card) 75' | Report | Kamara 70'; Bunbury 83' | Stadium: Home Depot Center; Referee: Kevin Stott |

| September 22, 2010 | Kansas City Wizards | 4–3 | Houston Dynamo | Kansas City, Kansas |
| | Kamara 35'; Bunbury 60'; Espinoza (yellow card) 67'; Serioux (Own Goal) 72'; Wolff 97+' | Report | Weaver 13'; Oduro 34'; Serioux 37'; Hainault (yellow card) 46'; Palmer (yellow card) 84'; Boswell (yellow card) 89'; Ngwenya (yellow card) 95+' | Stadium: CommunityAmerica Ballpark; Attendance: 9,679; Referee: Jair Marrufo |

| September 25, 2010 | Kansas City Wizards | 1–3 | FC Dallas | Kansas City, Kansas |
| | Harrington (yellow card) 32'; Smith 56'; Jewsbury (yellow card) 76' | Report | Chávez 4'; Rodríguez 12'; Pearce (yellow card) 37'; McCarty (yellow card) 74'; Cunningham 81'; Harris (yellow card) 85'; Ferreira (yellow card) 86' | Stadium: CommunityAmerica Ballpark; Attendance: 10,385; Referee: Silviu Petrescu |

| October 2, 2010 | New York Red Bulls | 1–0 | Kansas City Wizards | Harrison, New Jersey |
| 3:00 PM CDT | Richards 6'; Miller (yellow card) 38'; Mendes (yellow card) 46'; Ballouchy (yellow card) 54' | report | | Stadium: Red Bull Arena; Attendance: 24,779 |

| October 9, 2010 | Kansas City Wizards | 1–2 | Seattle Sounders FC | Kansas City, Kansas |
| | Bunbury (yellow card) 63'; Arnaud (yellow card) 81' (goal) 84' (pen.) | Report | Alonso (yellow card) 28'; Freddy Montero (yellow card) 61'; Nyassi 66'; Fernández 78'; Jaqua (yellow card) 81' | Stadium: CommunityAmerica Ballpark; Attendance: 11,552 |

| October 12, 2010 | Chicago Fire | 0–2 | Kansas City Wizards | Bridgeview, Illinois |
| | | Report | Arnaud 46'; Arnaud (yellow card) 65'; Bunbury 80'; Zusi (yellow card) 91+' | Stadium: Toyota Park; Attendance: 12,230; Referee: Ricardo Salazar |

| October 16, 2010 | New England Revolution | 1–0 | Kansas City Wizards | Foxborough, Massachusetts |
| 8:00PM EDT | Joseph 31'; Mansally (yellow card) 78'; Osei (yellow card) 91+' | (report) | Jewsbury (yellow card) 29'; Espinoza (yellow card) 68' | Stadium: Gillette Stadium; Attendance: 18,298; Referee: Jair Marrufo |

| October 23, 2010 | Kansas City Wizards | 4–1 | San Jose Earthquakes | Kansas City, Kansas |
| 5:30pm PDT | Diop 36'; Diop 60'; Diop 76'; Eduardo 92+' (o.g.) | Report | Wondolowski 70' | Stadium: CommunityAmerica Ballpark; Attendance: 11,518; Referee: Jorge González |

=== U.S. Open Cup ===
| April 13, 2010 | Kansas City Wizards | 1–2 | Colorado Rapids | Kansas City, Missouri |
| 7:30PM | Bunbury 4' | report | Thompson 24' 81' | Stadium: Stanley H. Durwood Soccer Stadium; Attendance: 1,226; Referee: Tony Russo |

=== Friendlies ===
| July 25, 2010 | Kansas City Wizards | 2–1 | Manchester United | Kansas City, Missouri |
| 5:00PM | Arnaud 11'; Conrad (red card) 39'; Kamara 42' (yellow card) 43' | report | Giggs (yellow card) 33'; Berbatov 41' (pen.); Gibson (yellow card) 63' | Stadium: Arrowhead Stadium; Attendance: 52,424; Referee: Terry Vaughn |

== League table ==
Conference

| Pos | Team | Pld | W | L | T | GF | GA | GD | Pts | Qualification |
|---|---|---|---|---|---|---|---|---|---|---|
| 1 | New York Red Bulls | 30 | 15 | 9 | 6 | 38 | 29 | +9 | 51 | MLS Cup Playoffs |
| 2 | Columbus Crew | 30 | 14 | 8 | 8 | 40 | 34 | +6 | 50 | MLS Cup Playoffs |
| 3 | Kansas City Wizards | 30 | 11 | 13 | 6 | 36 | 35 | +1 | 39 | |
| 4 | Chicago Fire | 30 | 9 | 12 | 9 | 37 | 38 | −1 | 36 | |
| 5 | Toronto FC | 30 | 9 | 13 | 8 | 33 | 41 | −8 | 35 | |
| 6 | New England Revolution | 30 | 9 | 16 | 5 | 32 | 50 | −18 | 32 | |
| 7 | Philadelphia Union | 30 | 8 | 15 | 7 | 35 | 49 | −14 | 31 | |
| 8 | D.C. United | 30 | 6 | 20 | 4 | 21 | 47 | −26 | 22 | |

Source: MLS

Overall

| Pos | Team | Pld | W | L | T | GF | GA | GD | Pts | Qualification |
|---|---|---|---|---|---|---|---|---|---|---|
| 1 | LA Galaxy (S) | 30 | 18 | 7 | 5 | 44 | 26 | +18 | 59 | CONCACAF Champions League |
| 2 | Real Salt Lake | 30 | 15 | 4 | 11 | 45 | 20 | +25 | 56 | |
| 3 | New York Red Bulls | 30 | 15 | 9 | 6 | 38 | 29 | +9 | 51 | |
| 4 | FC Dallas | 30 | 12 | 4 | 14 | 42 | 28 | +14 | 50 | CONCACAF Champions League |
| 5 | Columbus Crew | 30 | 14 | 8 | 8 | 40 | 34 | +6 | 50 | |
| 6 | Seattle Sounders FC | 30 | 14 | 10 | 6 | 39 | 35 | +4 | 48 | CONCACAF Champions League |
| 7 | Colorado Rapids (C) | 30 | 12 | 8 | 10 | 44 | 32 | +12 | 46 | CONCACAF Champions League |
| 8 | San Jose Earthquakes | 30 | 13 | 10 | 7 | 34 | 33 | +1 | 46 | |
| 9 | Kansas City Wizards | 30 | 11 | 13 | 6 | 36 | 35 | +1 | 39 | |
| 10 | Chicago Fire | 30 | 9 | 12 | 9 | 37 | 38 | −1 | 36 | |
| 11 | Toronto FC | 30 | 9 | 13 | 8 | 33 | 41 | −8 | 35 | CONCACAF Champions League |
| 12 | Houston Dynamo | 30 | 9 | 15 | 6 | 40 | 49 | −9 | 33 | |
| 13 | New England Revolution | 30 | 9 | 16 | 5 | 32 | 50 | −18 | 32 | |
| 14 | Philadelphia Union | 30 | 8 | 15 | 7 | 35 | 49 | −14 | 31 | |
| 15 | Chivas USA | 30 | 8 | 18 | 4 | 31 | 45 | −14 | 28 | |
| 16 | D.C. United | 30 | 6 | 20 | 4 | 21 | 47 | −26 | 22 | |

Source: MLS
Rules for classification: 1) points; 2) head-to-head record; 3) goal difference; 4) number of goals scored
(C) Champions; (S) Supporters' Shield

=== Results summary ===
| Overall | | | | | | | | Home | | | | | | Away | | | | | |
| Pld | Pts | W | L | T | GF | GA | GD | W | L | T | GF | GA | GD | W | L | T | GF | GA | GD |
|---|---|---|---|---|---|---|---|---|---|---|---|---|---|---|---|---|---|---|---|
| 24 | 33 | 9 | 9 | 6 | 28 | 27 | +1 | 6 | 3 | 3 | 19 | 13 | +6 | 3 | 6 | 3 | 9 | 14 | −5 |

Last updated: September 23, 2010
Source: MLSNet.com
Pld = Matches played; Pts = Points; W = Matches won; T = Matches tied; L = Matches lost; GF = Goals for; GA = Goals against; GD = Goal difference

| Round | 1 | 2 | 3 | 4 | 5 | 6 | 7 | 8 | 9 | 10 | 11 | 12 | 13 | 14 | 15 | 16 | 17 | 18 | 19 | 20 | 21 | 22 | 23 | 24 | 25 | 26 | 27 | 28 | 29 | 30 |
|---|---|---|---|---|---|---|---|---|---|---|---|---|---|---|---|---|---|---|---|---|---|---|---|---|---|---|---|---|---|---|
| Stadium | H | H | A | H | A | A | H | H | A | A | H | H | A | H | A | A | H | H | A | H | A | A | A | H | H | A | H | A | A | H |
| Result | W | W | L | T | L | L | T | L | L | T | W | L | L | L | W | T | W | T | L | W | W | T | W | W | | | | | | |
| Position | 1 | 1 | 3 | 4 | 8 | 12 | 12 | 13 | 14 | 13 | 12 | 12 | 12 | 13 | 12 | 12 | 12 | 13 | 13 | 11 | 11 | 9 | 9 | 9 | | | | | | |

Updated to match(es) played on September 23, 2010. Source: MLS Results and League table
A = Away; H = Home; W = Win; L = Loss; T = Tie

== Statistics ==
| No. | Pos. | Name | MLS | | USOC | | Playoffs | | Total | | Minutes | | Discipline | |
| No. | Pos. | Name | Apps | Goals | Apps | Goals | Apps | Goals | Apps | Goals | League | Total | Yellow card | Red card |
|---|---|---|---|---|---|---|---|---|---|---|---|---|---|---|
| 1 | GK | (Denmark) Jimmy Nielsen | 18 | 0 | 0 | 0 | 0 | 0 | 18 | 0 | **1,630** | 1,620 | 0 | 0 |
| 2 | DF | (United States) Michael Harrington | 18 | 0 | 1 | 0 | 0 | 0 | **19** | 0 | 1,617 | **1,662** | 2 | 0 |
| 3 | DF | (England) Korede Aiyegbusi | 4 | 0 | 1 | 0 | 0 | 0 | 5 | 0 | 84 | 129 | 0 | 0 |
| 4 | MF | (England) Craig Rocastle | 11 | 0 | 1 | 0 | 0 | 0 | 12 | 0 | 547 | 640 | 4 | 1 |
| 5 | DF | (United States) Matt Besler | 8 | 0 | 0 | 0 | 0 | 0 | 8 | 0 | 418 | 418 | 2 | 0 |
| 6 | DF | (Colombia) Pablo Escobar* | 7 | 0 | 1 | 0 | 0 | 0 | 8 | 0 | 529 | 609 | 1 | 0 |
| 6 | DF | (Jamaica) Shavar Thomas | 6 | 0 | 0 | 0 | 0 | 0 | 6 | 0 | 540 | 540 | 0 | 0 |
| 7 | DF | (United States) Chance Myers | 10 | 0 | 1 | 0 | 0 | 0 | 11 | 0 | 467 | 557 | 0 | 0 |
| 8 | MF | (Guadeloupe) Stéphane Auvray | 12 | 0 | 1 | 0 | 0 | 0 | 13 | 0 | 1,037 | 1,061 | 2 | 0 |
| 9 | FW | (Canada) Teal Bunbury | 16 | 2 | 1 | **1** | 0 | 0 | 17 | 3 | 768 | 858 | 2 | 0 |
| 10 | MF | (Argentina) Santiago Hirsig* | 1 | 0 | 0 | 0 | 0 | 0 | 1 | 0 | 45 | 45 | 0 | 0 |
| 11 | MF | (England) Ryan Smith | 18 | 1 | 0 | 0 | 0 | 0 | 18 | 1 | 1,420 | 1,420 | 4 | 0 |
| 12 | DF | (United States) Jimmy Conrad | 16 | 0 | 1 | 0 | 0 | 0 | 17 | 0 | 1,382 | 1,472 | **5** | 0 |
| 14 | MF | (United States) Jack Jewsbury | 17 | 1 | 0 | 0 | 0 | 0 | 17 | 1 | 1,250 | 1,250 | 2 | 0 |
| 15 | DF | (United States) Aaron Hohlbein* | 2 | 0 | 0 | 0 | 0 | 0 | 2 | 0 | 111 | 111 | 0 | 0 |
| 16 | FW | (United States) Josh Wolff | 16 | 1 | 1 | 0 | 0 | 0 | 17 | 1 | 1,142 | 1,230 | 1 | 0 |
| 17 | MF | (Honduras) Roger Espinoza | 13 | 0 | 0 | 0 | 0 | 0 | 13 | 0 | 1,112 | 1,112 | 2 | 0 |
| 18 | GK | (United States) Eric Kronberg | 0 | 0 | 1 | 0 | 0 | 0 | 1 | 0 | 0 | 90 | 0 | 0 |
| 19 | FW | (India) Sunil Chhetri* | 0 | 0 | 1 | 0 | 0 | 0 | 1 | 0 | 0 | 45 | 1 | 0 |
| 20 | FW | (Hungary) Zoltán Hercegfalvi | 0 | 0 | 0 | 0 | 0 | 0 | 0 | 0 | 0 | 0 | 0 | 0 |
| 21 | MF | (Moldova) Igor Kostrov* | 0 | 0 | 0 | 0 | 0 | 0 | 0 | 0 | 0 | 0 | 0 | 0 |
| 22 | MF | (United States) Davy Arnaud | 15 | 2 | 0 | 0 | 0 | 0 | 15 | 2 | 1,281 | 1,281 | 2 | **3** |
| 23 | FW | (Sierra Leone) Kei Kamara | 18 | **7** | 1 | 0 | 0 | 0 | **19** | **7** | 1,521 | 1,566 | 4 | 0 |
| 25 | DF | (United States) Jonathan Leathers | 5 | 0 | 1 | 0 | 0 | 0 | 6 | 0 | 194 | 284 | 0 | 0 |
| 27 | MF | (Senegal) Birahim Diop | 5 | 0 | 1 | 0 | 0 | 0 | 6 | 0 | 19 | 26 | 0 | 0 |
| 28 | MF | (United States) Graham Zusi | 11 | 1 | 1 | 0 | 0 | 0 | 12 | 1 | 379 | 445 | 1 | 0 |

=== Goalkeepers ===
| No. | Name | MLS | | | | USOC | | | | Playoffs | | | | Total | | | |
| No. | Name | Apps | GA | GAA | CS | Apps | GA | GAA | CS | Apps | GA | GAA | CS | Apps | GA | GAA | SHO |
|---|---|---|---|---|---|---|---|---|---|---|---|---|---|---|---|---|---|
| 1 | (Denmark) Jimmy Nielsen | 18 | 21 | 1.16 | 7 | – | – | – | – | – | – | – | – | **18** | **21** | **1.16** | **7** |
| 18 | (United States) Eric Kronberg | – | – | – | – | 1 | 2 | 2 | 0 | – | – | – | – | **1** | **2** | **2** | **0** |

Statistics accurate as of match played August 8, 2010
left club during season*
club leader(s) bolded

== Squad ==
As of August 6, 2010.

Note: Flags indicate national team as defined under FIFA eligibility rules; some limited exceptions apply. Players may hold more than one non-FIFA nationality.

| No. | Pos. | Nation | Player |
|---|---|---|---|
| 1 | GK | DEN | Jimmy Nielsen |
| 2 | DF | USA | Michael Harrington |
| 3 | DF | ENG | Korede Aiyegbusi |
| 4 | MF | ENG | Craig Rocastle |
| 5 | DF | USA | Matt Besler |
| 6 | DF | JAM | Shavar Thomas |
| 7 | DF | USA | Chance Myers |
| 8 | MF | GLP | Stéphane Auvray |
| 9 | FW | USA | Teal Bunbury |
| 11 | MF | ENG | Ryan Smith |
| 12 | DF | USA | Jimmy Conrad |
| 14 | MF | USA | Jack Jewsbury |
| 15 | DF | USA | Aaron Hohlbein (loan to Miami FC) |

| No. | Pos. | Nation | Player |
|---|---|---|---|
| 16 | FW | USA | Josh Wolff |
| 17 | MF | HON | Roger Espinoza |
| 18 | GK | USA | Eric Kronberg |
| 19 | FW | IND | Sunil Chhetri |
| 20 | FW | HUN | Zoltán Hercegfalvi |
| 22 | MF | USA | Davy Arnaud (captain) |
| 23 | FW | SLE | Kei Kamara |
| 24 | MF | USA | Jamar Beasley |
| 25 | DF | USA | Jonathan Leathers |
| 27 | MF | SEN | Birahim Diop |
| 28 | MF | USA | Graham Zusi |
| — | FW | MEX | Omar Bravo (loan to C.D. Guadalajara) |

=== Formation ===
Regular starting XI:
