= 2011 Sporting Kansas City season =

Sporting Kansas City
2011 season
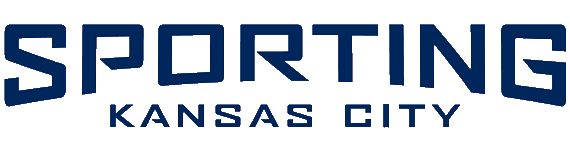
- Owner: Sporting Club
- Head coach: Peter Vermes
- Stadium: Livestrong Sporting Park
- MLS: East: 1st Overall: 5th
- MLS Cup: Conference Finals
- U.S. Open Cup: Quarterfinals
- Top goalscorer: League: Teal Bunbury; Omar Bravo; Kei Kamara (9); All: Teal Bunbury (12)
- Average home league attendance: 17,810
| Home colors | Away colors |

The 2011 Sporting Kansas City season was the sixteenth season of the team's existence in Major League Soccer but the first year played under the Sporting Kansas City moniker.

The club's first league game of the season was on March 19, 2011, at Chivas USA. The regular season concluded on October 22, 2011. Sporting began the season with a record 10 game road trip while its new stadium, Livestrong Sporting Park, was being completed. The first home game at the new stadium was on June 9, 2011, versus the Chicago Fire.

== Overview ==
=== Preseason ===
After all players reported to Kansas City for entrance physicals and a week's worth of training at the Kansas City Chiefs Indoor Practice Facility, Sporting Kansas City traveled to Phoenix, Arizona for the second straight season to train at the Reach 11 Sports Complex. Designated Player Omar Bravo made his long-awaited debut with the team and the coaching staff brought in more than a dozen guest trialists for evaluation, including Chad Ochocinco.

== Squad ==
=== First team roster ===
As of September 15, 2011.

Note: Flags indicate national team as defined under FIFA eligibility rules; some limited exceptions apply. Players may hold more than one non-FIFA nationality.

| No. | Pos. | Nation | Player |
|---|---|---|---|
| 1 | GK | DEN | Jimmy Nielsen |
| 2 | DF | USA | Michael Harrington |
| 3 | DF | ENG | Korede Aiyegbusi |
| 4 | MF | GRN | Craig Rocastle |
| 5 | DF | USA | Matt Besler |
| 6 | DF | JAM | Shavar Thomas |
| 7 | DF | USA | Chance Myers |
| 8 | MF | USA | Graham Zusi |
| 9 | FW | USA | Teal Bunbury |
| 10 | MF | BRA | Jéferson |
| 11 | FW | USA | Soony Saad |
| 12 | MF | USA | Konrad Warzycha |
| 13 | DF | KEN | Lawrence Olum |
| 14 | DF | USA | Kevin Ellis |
| 15 | MF | HON | Roger Espinoza |

| No. | Pos. | Nation | Player |
|---|---|---|---|
| 16 | DF | USA | Seth Sinovic |
| 17 | FW | USA | C. J. Sapong |
| 18 | GK | USA | Eric Kronberg |
| 19 | MF | HAI | Peterson Joseph |
| 20 | MF | SEN | Birahim Diop |
| 21 | GK | USA | Jon Kempin |
| 22 | MF | USA | Davy Arnaud (captain) |
| 23 | FW | SLE | Kei Kamara |
| 24 | DF | USA | Scott Lorenz |
| 25 | DF | TRI | Daneil Cyrus |
| 32 | MF | USA | Luke Sassano |
| 55 | DF | BRA | Júlio César |
| 78 | DF | FRA | Aurélien Collin |
| 88 | MF | MNE | Miloš Stojčev |
| 99 | FW | MEX | Omar Bravo |

== Player movement ==
=== In ===
| Date | Player | Position | Previous club | Fee/notes | Ref |
|---|---|---|---|---|---|
| December 15, 2010 | (United States) Frankie Hejduk | DF | (United States) Columbus Crew | Selected in the Re-Entry Draft, subsequently traded | |
| December 15, 2010 | (United States) Luke Sassano | MF | (United States) Los Angeles Galaxy | Acquired in exchange for Frankie Hejduk | |
| January 1, 2011 | (Mexico) Omar Bravo | FW | (Mexico) C.D. Guadalajara | Undisclosed | |
| February 18, 2011 | (United States) Kevin Ellis | DF | (United States) Sporting Kansas City Juniors | Homegrown Player | |
| March 1, 2011 | (United States) C. J. Sapong | FW | (United States) James Madison University | SuperDraft, 1st round | |
| March 1, 2011 | (United States) Mike Jones | DF | (United States) Southern Illinois University Edwardsville | Supplemental Draft, 2nd round | |
| March 1, 2011 | (United States) Scott Lorenz | DF | (United States) NSC Minnesota Stars | Free | |
| March 3, 2011 | (United States) Konrad Warzycha | MF | (United States) Ohio State University | SuperDraft, 3rd round | |
| March 14, 2011 | (Brazil) Júlio César | DF | (Portugal) Marítimo | Free | |
| March 16, 2011 | (Montenegro) Miloš Stojčev | MF | (Serbia) FK Borac Čačak | Undisclosed | |
| April 15, 2011 | (France) Aurélien Collin | DF | (Portugal) Vitória de Setúbal | Undisclosed | |
| May 10, 2011 | (United States) Seth Sinovic | DF | (United States) New England Revolution | Free | |
| July 5, 2011 | (United States) Soony Saad | FW | (United States) University of Michigan | Weighted lottery | |
| September 1, 2011 | (Haiti) Peterson Joseph | MF | (Portugal) Braga | Undisclosed | |
| September 15, 2011 | (Kenya) Lawrence Olum | DF | (United States) Orlando City | Undisclosed | |

=== Out ===
| Date | Player | Position | Destination club | Fee/notes | Ref |
|---|---|---|---|---|---|
| November 24, 2010 | (United States) Jamar Beasley | FW | (United States) Missouri Comets | Option declined | |
| November 24, 2010 | (United States) Jonathan Leathers | DF | (Canada) Vancouver Whitecaps | Selected in the Expansion Draft | |
| December 8, 2010 | (United States) Aaron Hohlbein | DF | (United States) Columbus Crew | Selected in the Re-Entry Draft | |
| December 15, 2010 | (United States) Jimmy Conrad | DF | (United States) Chivas USA | Selected in the Re-Entry Draft | |
| December 15, 2010 | (United States) Josh Wolff | FW | (United States) D.C. United | Selected in the Re-Entry Draft | |
| December 15, 2010 | (United States) Frankie Hejduk | DF | (United States) Los Angeles Galaxy | Traded for Luke Sassano | |
| February 7, 2011 | (India) Sunil Chhetri | FW | (India) Chirag United | Option declined | |
| February 7, 2011 | (Greece) Nikos Kounenakis | DF | | Released | |
| March 1, 2011 | (Hungary) Zoltan Hercegfalvi | FW | (Hungary) Budapest Honvéd FC II | Loan expired | |
| March 1, 2011 | (United States) Jack Jewsbury | MF | (United States) Portland Timbers | Traded for allocation money | |
| May 5, 2011 | (United States) Mike Jones | DF | (United States) New York Red Bulls | Released, free transfer | |
| August 12, 2011 | (Guadeloupe) Stéphane Auvray | MF | (United States) New York Red Bulls | Traded for 2nd round draft pick in 2013 MLS SuperDraft | |

=== Loans ===
==== In ====
| Date | Player | Position | Loaned from | Fee/notes | Ref |
|---|---|---|---|---|---|
| July 16, 2011 | (Trinidad and Tobago) Daneil Cyrus | DF | (Trinidad and Tobago) FC Santa Rosa | Thru the 2011 season | |
| July 17, 2011 | (Brazil) Jéferson | MF | (Brazil) Vasco da Gama | Thru the 2011 season, Designated Player | |

==== Out ====
| Date | Player | Position | Loaned to | Fee/notes | Ref |
|---|---|---|---|---|---|
| July 27, 2011 | (United States) Scott Lorenz | DF | (United States) NSC Minnesota Stars | Loan terminated September 8, 2011 | |

== Major League Soccer ==
=== League table ===
| Pos | Team | Pld | W | L | T | GF | GA | GD | Pts | Qualification |
|---|---|---|---|---|---|---|---|---|---|---|
| 1 | LA Galaxy (S, C) | 34 | 19 | 5 | 10 | 48 | 28 | +20 | 67 | CONCACAF Champions League |
| 2 | Seattle Sounders FC | 34 | 18 | 7 | 9 | 56 | 37 | +19 | 63 | CONCACAF Champions League |
| 3 | Real Salt Lake | 34 | 15 | 11 | 8 | 44 | 36 | +8 | 53 | CONCACAF Champions League |
| 4 | FC Dallas | 34 | 15 | 12 | 7 | 42 | 39 | +3 | 52 | |
| 5 | Sporting Kansas City | 34 | 13 | 9 | 12 | 50 | 40 | +10 | 51 | |
| 6 | Houston Dynamo | 34 | 12 | 9 | 13 | 45 | 41 | +4 | 49 | CONCACAF Champions League |
| 7 | Colorado Rapids | 34 | 12 | 9 | 13 | 44 | 41 | +3 | 49 | |
| 8 | Philadelphia Union | 34 | 11 | 8 | 15 | 44 | 36 | +8 | 48 | |
| 9 | Columbus Crew | 34 | 13 | 13 | 8 | 43 | 44 | −1 | 47 | |
| 10 | New York Red Bulls | 34 | 10 | 8 | 16 | 50 | 44 | +6 | 46 | |
| 11 | Chicago Fire | 34 | 9 | 9 | 16 | 46 | 45 | +1 | 43 | |
| 12 | Portland Timbers | 34 | 11 | 14 | 9 | 40 | 48 | −8 | 42 | |
| 13 | D.C. United | 34 | 9 | 13 | 12 | 49 | 52 | −3 | 39 | |
| 14 | San Jose Earthquakes | 34 | 8 | 12 | 14 | 40 | 45 | −5 | 38 | |
| 15 | Chivas USA | 34 | 8 | 14 | 12 | 41 | 43 | −2 | 36 | |
| 16 | Toronto FC | 34 | 6 | 13 | 15 | 36 | 59 | −23 | 33 | CONCACAF Champions League |
| 17 | New England Revolution | 34 | 5 | 16 | 13 | 38 | 58 | −20 | 28 | |
| 18 | Vancouver Whitecaps FC | 34 | 6 | 18 | 10 | 35 | 55 | −20 | 28 | |

Source: MLS
Rules for classification: 1) points; 2) head-to-head record; 3) goal difference; 4) number of goals scored
(C) Champions; (S) Supporters' Shield

=== Eastern Conference standings ===
| Pos | Team | Pld | W | L | T | GF | GA | GD | Pts | Qualification |
|---|---|---|---|---|---|---|---|---|---|---|
| 1 | Sporting Kansas City | 34 | 13 | 9 | 12 | 50 | 40 | +10 | 51 | MLS Cup Conference Semifinals |
| 2 | Houston Dynamo | 34 | 12 | 9 | 13 | 45 | 41 | +4 | 49 | MLS Cup Conference Semifinals |
| 3 | Philadelphia Union | 34 | 11 | 8 | 15 | 44 | 36 | +8 | 48 | MLS Cup Conference Semifinals |
| 4 | Columbus Crew | 34 | 13 | 13 | 8 | 43 | 44 | −1 | 47 | MLS Cup Play-In Round |
| 5 | New York Red Bulls | 34 | 10 | 8 | 16 | 50 | 44 | +6 | 46 | MLS Cup Play-In Round |
| 6 | Chicago Fire | 34 | 9 | 9 | 16 | 46 | 45 | +1 | 43 | |
| 7 | D.C. United | 34 | 9 | 13 | 12 | 49 | 52 | −3 | 39 | |
| 8 | Toronto FC | 34 | 6 | 13 | 15 | 36 | 59 | −23 | 33 | |
| 9 | New England Revolution | 34 | 5 | 16 | 13 | 38 | 58 | −20 | 28 | |

Source: MLS

=== Results summary ===
| Overall | | | | | | | | Home | | | | | | Away | | | | | |
| Pld | Pts | W | L | T | GF | GA | GD | W | L | T | GF | GA | GD | W | L | T | GF | GA | GD |
|---|---|---|---|---|---|---|---|---|---|---|---|---|---|---|---|---|---|---|---|
| 34 | 51 | 13 | 9 | 12 | 50 | 40 | +10 | 9 | 2 | 6 | 29 | 16 | +13 | 4 | 7 | 6 | 21 | 24 | −3 |

Last updated: October 26, 2011
Source: MLSSoccer.com
Pld = Matches played; Pts = Points; W = Matches won; T = Matches tied; L = Matches lost; GF = Goals for; GA = Goals against; GD = Goal difference

| Round | 1 | 2 | 3 | 4 | 5 | 6 | 7 | 8 | 9 | 10 | 11 | 12 | 13 | 14 | 15 | 16 | 17 | 18 | 19 | 20 | 21 | 22 | 23 | 24 | 25 | 26 | 27 | 28 | 29 | 30 | 31 | 32 | 33 | 34 |
|---|---|---|---|---|---|---|---|---|---|---|---|---|---|---|---|---|---|---|---|---|---|---|---|---|---|---|---|---|---|---|---|---|---|---|
| Stadium | A | A | A | A | A | A | A | A | A | A | H | A | H | A | H | A | H | H | A | H | H | H | H | H | H | H | H | H | A | H | H | A | H | A |
| Result | W | L | T | L | L | L | L | L | T | T | T | W | W | T | W | W | T | T | T | W | T | W | L | W | W | L | T | W | L | T | W | T | W | W |
| Position | 4 | 11 | 8 | 12 | 15 | 18 | 18 | 18 | 18 | 18 | 18 | 18 | 18 | 17 | 14 | 10 | 11 | 12 | 12 | 10 | 9 | 9 | 9 | 8 | 7 | 7 | 7 | 6 | 7 | 7 | 5 | 5 | 5 | 5 |

Updated to match(es) played on October 26, 2011. Source: MLS Results and League table
A = Away; H = Home; W = Win; L = Loss; T = Tie

=== Match results ===
Win Tie Loss

==== Preseason ====
| February 5, 2011 | Columbus Crew | 2–2 | Sporting Kansas City | Phoenix, Arizona |
| | Alex Fraga; Robbie Rogers | | Jack Jewsbury; Kei Kamara | Stadium: Reach 11 Sports Complex |

| February 12, 2011 | Colorado Rapids | 0–0 | Sporting Kansas City | Phoenix, Arizona |
| | | | | Stadium: Reach 11 Sports Complex |

| February 15, 2011 | Houston Dynamo | 3–1 | Sporting Kansas City | Phoenix, Arizona |
| | Own goal Jason Garey; Andrew Hainault | | Chance Myers | Stadium: Reach 11 Sports Complex |

| February 15, 2011 | U.S. national under-18 team | 1–0 | Sporting Kansas City | Phoenix, Arizona |
| | Khyri Shelton | | | Stadium: Reach 11 Sports Complex |

| February 26, 2011 | Portland Timbers | 0–0 | Sporting Kansas City | Casa Grande, Arizona |
| | | | | Stadium: Grande Sports World |

| February 26, 2011 | Montreal Impact | 0–2 | Sporting Kansas City | Casa Grande, Arizona |
| | | | Own goal C.J. Sapong | Stadium: Grande Sports World |

===== 2011 Desert Cup =====
| March 4, 2011 | Arizona Sahuaros | 1–6 | Sporting Kansas City | Tucson, Arizona |
| | Baker 86' | Report | Jones 35'; Mravec 53'; Sapong 56'; Myers 77'; Zusi 83'; Ubiparipovic 90' | Stadium: Hi Corbett Field; Attendance: 2,560 |

| March 5, 2011 | New York Red Bulls | 2–2 | Sporting Kansas City | Tucson, Arizona |
| | Henry 22'; Richards 76' | Report | Arnaud 20'; Kamara 61' (pen.) | Stadium: Hi Corbett Field; Attendance: 10,097 |

==== Regular season ====
| March 19, 2011 | Chivas USA | 2–3 | Sporting Kansas City | Carson, California |
| 21:30 CDT | Conrad (yellow card) 27'; Conrad 56'; Valentin (yellow card) 52'; Zemanski 84' | Report | Sapong 2'; Arnaud (yellow card) 23'; Bravo 45+3'; Bravo (yellow card) 71'; Bravo 74' | Stadium: The Home Depot Center; Attendance: 18,122; Referee: Edvin Jurisevic |

| March 26, 2011 | Chicago Fire | 3–2 | Sporting Kansas City | Bridgeview, Illinois |
| 15:00 CDT | Cháves 30' (pen.); Puerari 40'; Puerari (yellow card) 48'; Pappa 59' | Report | Bravo (red card) 30'; Besler 51'; Arnaud (yellow card) 58'; Bunbury 72'; Diop (yellow card) 88' | Stadium: Toyota Park; Attendance: 12,157; Referee: Jasen Anno |

| April 2, 2011 | Vancouver Whitecaps FC | 3–3 | Sporting Kansas City | Vancouver, British Columbia Canada |
| 18:00 CDT | Harris 73'; Camilo 90+2 ', 90+3' | Report | Bunbury 45+1', 58'; Kamara 62'; Harrington (yellow card) 64'; Diop (yellow card) 68'; Bunbury (yellow card) 88' | Stadium: Empire Field; Attendance: 20,518; Referee: Drew Fischer |

| April 16, 2011 | Columbus Crew | 1–0 | Sporting Kansas City | Columbus, Ohio |
| 18:30 CDT | Rogers 53' | Report | Júlio César (yellow card) 50' (yellow-red card) 72'; Harrington (yellow card) 55'; Thomas (yellow card) 76' | Stadium: Crew Stadium; Attendance: 7,695; Referee: Juan Guzman |

| April 23, 2011 | New England Revolution | 3–2 | Sporting Kansas City | Foxboro, Massachusetts |
| 18:30 CDT | Perović 12'; McCarthy (yellow card) 19'; Perović (yellow card) 42'; Joseph 72'; Mansally (yellow card) 78'; Lekić 83'; Lekić (yellow card) 84'; Joseph (yellow card) 90+3' | Report | Kamara 14', 69'; Collin (yellow card) 23' (red card) 75'; Besler (yellow card) 48'; Harrington (yellow card) 54' | Stadium: Gillette Stadium; Attendance: 11,414; Referee: Edvin Jurisevic |

| April 30, 2011 | New York Red Bulls | 1–0 | Sporting Kansas City | Harrison, New Jersey |
| 18:30 CDT | | | | Stadium: Red Bull Arena |

| May 14, 2011 | Los Angeles Galaxy | 4–1 | Sporting Kansas City | Carson, California |
| 21:30 CDT | | | | Stadium: The Home Depot Center |

| May 21, 2011 | Seattle Sounders FC | 1–0 | Sporting Kansas City | Seattle, Washington |
| 21:00 CDT | | | | Stadium: Qwest Field |

| May 28, 2011 | Colorado Rapids | 1–1 | Sporting Kansas City | Commerce City, Colorado |
| 20:00 CDT | | | | Stadium: Dick's Sporting Goods Park |

| June 4, 2011 | Toronto FC | 0–0 | Sporting Kansas City | Toronto, Ontario Canada |
| 18:00 CDT | | | | Stadium: BMO Field |

| June 9, 2011 | Sporting Kansas City | 0–0 | Chicago Fire | Kansas City, Kansas |
| 21:00 CDT | | Report | | Stadium: Livestrong Sporting Park; Attendance: 19,925 |

| June 12, 2011 | FC Dallas | 1–4 | Sporting Kansas City | Frisco, Texas USA |
| 18:00 CDT | Shea 32'; Loyd (yellow card) 47+'; Ihemelu (yellow card) 56'; Rodriguez (yellow card) 89' | Report | Collin (yellow card) 21'; Zusi 28' 55'; Sinovic (yellow card) 33' (yellow-red card) 56'; Stojcev (yellow card) 39'; Collin 49'; Sassano 78' | Stadium: Pizza Hut Park; Attendance: 10,450; Referee: Kevin Stott |

| June 17, 2011 | Sporting Kansas City | 1–0 | San Jose Earthquakes | Kansas City, Kansas |
| 19:30 CDT | Sapong 31' | Report | | Stadium: Livestrong Sporting Park; Attendance: 18,467 |

| June 22, 2011 | Philadelphia Union | 0–0 | Sporting Kansas City | Chester, Pennsylvania |
| 18:30 CDT | | Report | | Stadium: PPL Park; Attendance: 18,127 |

| June 25, 2011 | Sporting Kansas City | 2–1 | Vancouver Whitecaps FC | Kansas City, Kansas |
| 19:30 CDT | Bravo 33' (pen.); Júlio César 40' | Report | Camilo 15' | Stadium: Livestrong Sporting Park; Attendance: 18,467 |

| July 2, 2011 | Portland Timbers | 1–2 | Sporting Kansas City | Portland, Oregon |
| 22:00 CDT | Nagbe 45' | Report | Sapong 15'; Collin 19' | Stadium: Jeld-Wen Field; Attendance: 18,627; Referee: Hilario Grajeda |

| July 6, 2011 | Sporting Kansas City | 1–1 | Colorado Rapids | Kansas City, Kansas |
| 19:30 CDT | Zusi 62' | Report | Casey 32' | Stadium: Livestrong Sporting Park; Attendance: 15,209; Referee: Niko Bratsis |

| July 9, 2011 | Sporting Kansas City | 1–1 | Chivas USA | Kansas City, Kansas |
| 18:30 CDT | Bravo 93' | Report | LaBrocca 30' | Stadium: Livestrong Sporting Park; Attendance: 18,467 |

| July 16, 2011 | Houston Dynamo | 1–1 | Sporting Kansas City | Houston, Texas |
| 19:30 CDT | Davis 8' | Report | Collin 90' | Stadium: Robertson Stadium; Attendance: 12,047 |

| July 23, 2011 | Sporting Kansas City | 4–2 | Toronto FC | Kansas City, Kansas |
| 19:30 CDT | Kamara 28' 33'; Bravo 37' 64' | Report | Koevermans 50'; Johnson 72' | Stadium: Livestrong Sporting Park; Attendance: 16,382 |

| July 30, 2011 | Sporting Kansas City | 1–1 | New England Revolution | Kansas City, Kansas |
| 19:30 CDT | Bunbury 89' | Report | Lekic 38' | Stadium: Livestrong Sporting Park; Attendance: 17,418 |

| August 3, 2011 | Sporting Kansas City | 2–0 | Real Salt Lake | Kansas City, Kansas |
| 19:30 CDT | Espinoza 29'; Bunbury 34' | Report | | Stadium: Livestrong Sporting Park; Attendance: 18,467 |

| August 6, 2011 | Sporting Kansas City | 1–2 | Seattle Sounders FC | Kansas City, Kansas |
| 19:30 CDT | Kamara 20' | Report | Rosales 90'; Neagle 92' | Stadium: Livestrong Sporting Park; Attendance: 17,493 |

| August 17, 2011 | Sporting Kansas City | 3–1 | Portland Timbers | Kansas City, Kansas |
| 19:30 CDT | Zusi 25' 40'; Saad 73' | Report | Dike 81' | Stadium: Livestrong Sporting Park; Attendance: 15,271 |

| August 21, 2011 | Sporting Kansas City | 1–0 | D.C. United | Kansas City, Kansas |
| 19:30 CDT | Kamara 19' | Report | | Stadium: Livestrong Sporting Park; Attendance: 15,352 |

| August 27, 2011 | Sporting Kansas City | 2–3 | FC Dallas | Kansas City, Kansas |
| 19:30 CDT | Kamara 22'; Bravo 68' | Report | Hernandez 70'; Santos 89'; Warshaw 92' | Stadium: Livestrong Sporting Park; Attendance: 20,018 |

| September 5, 2011 | Sporting Kansas City | 2–2 | Los Angeles Galaxy | Kansas City, Kansas |
| 17:00 CDT | Cesar 72'; Bravo 92' | Report | Franklin 25' 74' | Stadium: Livestrong Sporting Park; Attendance: 20,512 |

| September 10, 2011 | Sporting Kansas City | 3–0 | Houston Dynamo | Kansas City, Kansas |
| 15:00 CDT | Bunbury 9' 73'; Sapong 79' | Report | | Stadium: Livestrong Sporting Park; Attendance: 14,791 |

| September 17, 2011 | Real Salt Lake | 1–0 | Sporting Kansas City | Sandy, Utah |
| 20:00 CDT | Borchers 54' | Report | | Stadium: Rio Tinto Stadium; Attendance: 19,888 |

| September 23, 2011 | Sporting Kansas City | 1–1 | Philadelphia Union | Kansas City, Kansas |
| 19:30 CDT | Bravo 56' | Report | Le Toux 63' | Stadium: Livestrong Sporting Park; Attendance: 18,778 |

| September 28, 2011 | Sporting Kansas City | 2–1 | Columbus Crew | Kansas City, Kansas |
| 19:30 CDT | Kamara 15' (pen.); James 74' (o.g.) | Report | Renteria 34' | Stadium: Livestrong Sporting Park; Attendance: 17,838 |

| October 1, 2011 | San Jose Earthquakes | 1–1 | Sporting Kansas City | Santa Clara, California |
| 21:30 CDT | Wondolowski 85' | Report | Bunbury 85' | Stadium: Buck Shaw Stadium; Attendance: 10,525 |

| October 15, 2011 | Sporting Kansas City | 2–0 | New York Red Bulls | Kansas City, Kansas |
| 15:00 CDT | Bunbury 57'; Sapong 74' | Report | | Stadium: Livestrong Sporting Park; Attendance: 19,921 |

| October 22, 2011 | D.C. United | 0–1 | Sporting Kansas City | Washington, D.C. |
| 18:30 CDT | | Report | Besler 34' | Stadium: RFK Stadium; Attendance: 15,965 |

==== MLS Cup Playoffs ====
| October 30, 2011 Conference Semifinal; 1st Leg | Colorado Rapids | 0–2 | Kansas City | Dick's Sporting Goods Park, Commerce City |
| 18:30 CDT | Marshall (red card) 57'; Nyassi (yellow card) 63' | Report | Bunbury (yellow card) 45+2' (goal) 49' 59' (pen.) | Attendance: 8,601; Referee: Baldomero Toledo |

| November 2, 2011 Conference Semifinal; 2nd Leg | Sporting Kansas City | 2–0 (4–0 agg.) | Colorado Rapids | Kansas City, Kansas |
| 19:00 CST | Collin 28'; Espinoza (yellow card) 35'; Cesar (yellow card) 45+3'; Arnaud (yellow card) 65'; Sapong 76' | Report | Nane (yellow card) 27'; Comminges (yellow card) 55'; Mullan (yellow card) 75'; Nyassi (yellow card) 90+3' | Stadium: Livestrong Sporting Park; Attendance: 18,565; Referee: Kevin Stott |

| November 6, 2011 Conference Final | Sporting Kansas City | 0–2 | Houston Dynamo | Kansas City, Kansas |
| 16:30 CST | | Report | Hainault 53'; Costly 87' | Stadium: Livestrong Sporting Park; Attendance: 20,839 |

== U.S. Open Cup ==
Sporting Kansas City began qualification for the 2011 U.S. Open Cup with a 1–0 victory over Houston Dynamo on April 6, 2011. Sporting Kansas City was one of ten MLS clubs vying for two play-in berths available. In the qualification finals, the club defeated New England Revolution 5–0 on May 25, 2011. Sporting KC entered the formal Cup competition in the Third round, defeating the Chicago Fire Premier club 3–0 on June 28, 2011. In the Quarterfinal round on July 12, 2011, they were defeated by the Richmond Kickers.

Kickoff times are in CDT.

| April 6, 2011 Qualifying Semifinal | Houston Dynamo | 0–1 (a.e.t) | Sporting Kansas City | College Station, Texas |
| 19:00 | Sarkodie (yellow card) 5'; Palmer (yellow card) 43'; Chabala (yellow card) 65'; Boswell (yellow card) 73' | Report | (yellow card) 46' Bravo; 92' Sapong | Stadium: Aggie Soccer Stadium (Texas A&M); Attendance: 2,383; Referee: Ismail Elfath |

| May 25, 2011 Qualifying Final | Sporting Kansas City | 5–0 | New England Revolution | Overland Park, Kansas |
| | Myers 9', 19'; Sapong 24', 88'; Collin 81' | Report | | Stadium: Blue Valley District Athletic Center; Attendance: 1,228; Referee: Sorin Stoica |

| June 28, 2011 Third Round | Sporting Kansas City | 3–0 | Chicago Fire Premier | Kansas City, Kansas |
| 19:30 CDT | Bunbury 3'; Stojčev 58'; Kamara 59' | Report | | Stadium: Livestrong Sporting Park; Attendance: 4,487; Referee: Landis Wiley |

| July 12, 2011 Quarterfinals | Sporting Kansas City | 0–2 | Richmond Kickers | Kansas City, Kansas |
| 19:30 CDT | | Report | Bangura 66'; Bulow 83' | Stadium: Livestrong Sporting Park; Attendance: 4,794 |

== Friendly Matches ==
Sporting Kansas City team played a friendly match against the English Premier League team Newcastle United on July 20, 2011. They also hosted the Liga MX México Primera División team Club Deportivo Guadalajara on October 12, 2011.

| July 20, 2011 | Sporting Kansas City | 0–0 | Newcastle United | Kansas City, Kansas |
| 19:30 CDT | | Report | | Stadium: Livestrong Sporting Park; Attendance: 16,131 |

| October 12, 2011 | Sporting Kansas City | 2 - 2 | C.D. Guadalajara | Kansas City, Kansas |
| 19:30 CDT | Saad 75'; Ellis 86' | Report | Fabian 20' (pen.); Torres 88' | Stadium: Livestrong Sporting Park; Attendance: 17,142 |

== Recognition ==
=== MLS Player of the Week ===
| Week | Player | Week's Statline |
|---|---|---|
| Week 1 | (Mexico) Omar Bravo | 2G |
| Week 23 | (United States) Graham Zusi | 2G |

=== AT&T Goal of the Week ===
| Week | Player |
|---|---|
| Week 19 | (Sierra Leone) Kei Kamara |
| Week 23 | (United States) Graham Zusi |

=== MLS Save of the Week ===
| Week | Player |
|---|---|
| Week 19 | (Denmark) Jimmy Nielsen |
| Week 21 | (Denmark) Jimmy Nielsen |
| Week 25 | (Denmark) Jimmy Nielsen |
| Week 32 | (Denmark) Jimmy Nielsen |

=== MLS Player of the Month ===
| Month | Player | Month's Statline |
|---|---|---|
| June | (United States) Graham Zusi | 2G 3A |

=== MLS All-Stars 2011 ===
| Position | Player | Note |
|---|---|---|
| DF | (United States) Matt Besler | AT&T Text Winner |
| FW | (Mexico) Omar Bravo | Commissioner Choice |

=== 2011 Team Awards ===
| Player(s) | Award |
|---|---|
| (Denmark) Jimmy Nielsen | Sporting Kansas City 2011 Most Valuable Player |
| (United States) Matt Besler | Sporting Kansas City 2011 Defensive Player of the Year |
| (Sierra Leone) Kei Kamara | Sporting Kansas City 2011 MLS W.O.R.K.S. Humanitarian of the Year |
| (United States) Nate Opperman | 2011 Bob Gansler Award - Most Outstanding Juniors Player of the Year |
| (Mexico) Omar Bravo (United States) Teal Bunbury (Sierra Leone) Kei Kamara | Sporting Kansas City 2011 Budweiser Golden Boot |

== Notable reserve games ==
The reserve game on March 28, 2011, against the Kansas City Brass garnered widespread interest due to NFL player Chad Ochocinco appearing for Sporting. Ochocinco briefly trained with the team during the NFL lockout.

== Miscellany ==
=== Allocation ranking ===
Sporting Kansas City is in the #4 position in the MLS Allocation Ranking. The allocation ranking is the mechanism used to determine which MLS club has first priority to acquire a U.S. National Team player who signs with MLS after playing abroad, or a former MLS player who returns to the league after having gone to a club abroad for a transfer fee. A ranking can be traded, provided that part of the compensation received in return is another club's ranking.

=== International roster spots ===
Sporting Kansas City has 9 international roster spots. Each club in Major League Soccer is allocated 8 international roster spots, which can be traded. Sporting Kansas City acquired an additional spot from D.C. United on 3 February 2010 for use during the 2010 and 2011 seasons. Sporting had also acquired another spot from Real Salt Lake on 23 February 2010 but that spot was for the 2010 season only and reverted to Real Salt Lake on 1 January 2011.

There is no limit on the number of international slots on each club's roster. The remaining roster slots must belong to domestic players. For clubs based in the United States, a domestic player is either a U.S. citizen, a permanent resident (green card holder) or the holder of other special status (e.g., refugee or asylum status).

=== Future draft pick trades ===
Future picks acquired: 2012 SuperDraft Round 2 pick acquired from FC Dallas; 2013 SuperDraft Round 2 pick acquired from New York Red Bulls.
Future picks traded: 2012 SuperDraft Round 2 pick traded to Philadelphia Union.

=== MLS rights to other players ===
It is believed that Sporting maintains the MLS rights to Herculez Gomez after the player declined a contract offer by the club and instead signed with a non-MLS side.
