= Pablo Escobar (disambiguation) =

Pablo Escobar (1949–1993) was a Colombian drug lord, and the wealthiest criminal in history.

Pablo Escobar may also refer to:

- Pablo Escobar (footballer, born 1979), Bolivian football attacking midfielder
- Pablo Escobar (footballer, born 1987), Colombian football centre-back
- Pablo Escobar, The Drug Lord, a Colombian television series
- Pablo Escobear, a bear that overdosed on cocaine.
