= Ryan Smith (footballer) =

English footballer (born 1986)

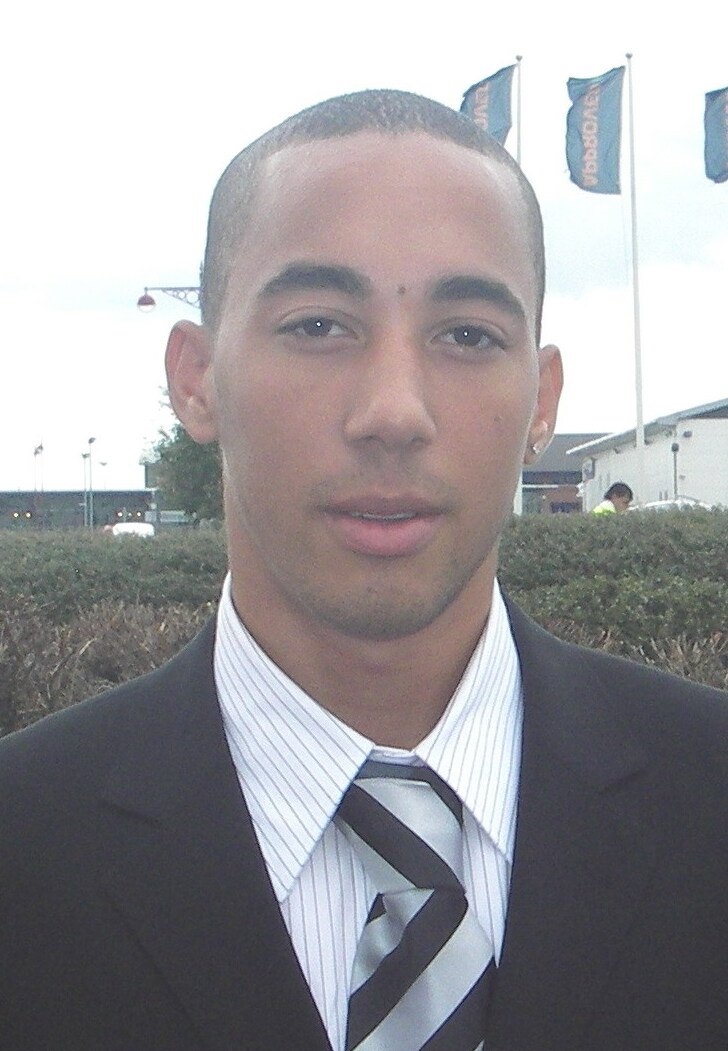
- Smith in 2006

Personal information
- Full name: Ryan Craig Matthew Smith
- Date of birth: 10 November 1986 (age 40)
- Place of birth: Islington, England
- Height: 5 ft 9 in (1.75 m)
- Position: Midfielder

Senior career*
Years	Team	Apps	(Gls)
2003–2006	Arsenal	0	(0)
2005–2006	→ Leicester City (loan)	17	(1)
2006–2007	Derby County	15	(0)
2006–2007	→ Millwall (loan)	6	(0)
2007–2009	Millwall	17	(0)
2008–2009	Southampton	13	(0)
2009–2010	Crystal Palace	5	(0)
2010–2011	Sporting Kansas City	32	(4)
2012	Chivas USA	21	(0)
2013	Skoda Xanthi	12	(0)
Total		138	(5)

International career
2002	England U16	6	(2)
2003	England U17	3	(0)
2004–2005	England U18	2	(1)
2004–2006	England U19	6	(1)
2004–2006	England U20	3	(0)
- * Club domestic league appearances and goals

Ryan Craig Matthew Smith (born 10 November 1986) is an English former footballer who previously played for Leicester City, Derby County, Millwall, Southampton and Crystal Palace before moving abroad to play in the USA and Greece.

== Personal ==
Smith's father is American, from Alaska and his mother is of English heritage, with his grandparents hailing from Montego Bay. He first attended St. Aloysius College secondary school, which was attended by West Ham United midfielder Joe Cole, before moving on to Highams Park School.

== Career ==
=== Arsenal ===
An England youth international, Smith started his career at Arsenal. He made his Arsenal debut against Rotherham United on 28 October 2003 at the age of 16. Arsenal won the tie 9–8 on penalties with Smith converting his spot kick. He also managed to start against Wolverhampton Wanderers and Middlesbrough. All of the six matches in which he played for Arsenal were in the League Cup, including a game on 9 November 2004 against Everton which saw him go off injured after 20 minutes.

=== Leicester City ===
On 30 September 2005, Smith was signed by Leicester City on loan for the whole of the 2005–06 season. He scored his first career goal in a 4–2 win over Sheffield United. He returned to Arsenal on 10 March 2006.

=== Derby County ===
On 4 August 2006, Smith agreed personal terms on a 3-year contract with Championship outfit Derby County. He made his debut in a 2–2 draw against Southampton on 6 August. After struggling to adapt and break into a Derby side pushing for promotion, plus the arrival of several midfielders in the January transfer window, Smith was sold.

=== Millwall ===
Smith moved on loan to League One side Millwall on 21 March 2007 on an initial one-month loan deal, but this was extended on 17 April 2007 to run until the end of the 2006–07 season. Smith impressed during his time on loan at Millwall and manager Willie Donachie expressed an interest in retaining the youngster's services. In July 2007 Millwall paid £150,000 for Smith, who signed a two-year contract with the club.

=== Southampton ===
On 3 October 2008, he joined Southampton initially on a three-month loan. The transfer became permanent on 1 January 2009, when Smith signed a 6-month contract. He was released by Southampton on 2 May 2009.

=== Crystal Palace ===
On 26 August 2009, he signed a contract with Crystal Palace. He made his Crystal Palace first team debut on 27 August in the 2–0 League Cup defeat to Manchester City coming on as a substitute in the second half. He left on 25 January 2010 after coming to the end of his short-term contract.

=== Kansas City Wizards/Sporting KC ===
On 27 January 2010, Smith joined Grimsby Town on trial, playing for The Mariners in a behind the closed doors friendly against Hull City at Blundell Park. On 2 February 2010, it was reported that Smith would join Kansas City Wizards on trial during their preseason training camp in Arizona, and on 2 March he signed a two-year deal with the club. Smith scored on his Kansas City debut in a 4–0 win over D.C. United.

While still under contract to Sporting Kansas City, Smith left in June 2011, eventually trialing in Spain with Real Zaragoza in July. Kansas City declined to transfer him, however.

=== Chivas USA ===
On 21 November 2011, Sporting Kansas City traded Smith's rights to Chivas USA in exchange for two 2012 MLS Supplemental Draft picks.

=== Skoda Xanthi ===
Smith signed with Greek club Skoda Xanthi on 29 December 2012.

== Career statistics ==
Club	League	Season	League		Cup		Total	
Club	League	Season	Apps	Goals	Apps	Goals	Apps	Goals
Arsenal	Premier League	2003–04	0	0	3	0	3	0
Arsenal	Premier League	2004–05	0	0	3	0	3	0
Arsenal	Total		0	0	6	0	6	0
Leicester (loan)	Championship	2005–06	17	1	2	0	19	1
Derby	Championship	2006–07	15	0	5	0	20	0
Millwall (loan)	League One	2006–07	6	0	0	0	6	0
Millwall	League One	2007–08	16	0	0	0	16	0
Millwall	League One	2008–09	1	0	0	0	1	0
Millwall	Total		23	0	0	0	23	0
Southampton	Championship	2008–09	13	0	1	0	14	0
Crystal Palace	Championship	2009–10	5	0	1	0	6	0
Sporting Kansas City	Major League Soccer	2010	26	3	0	0	26	3
Sporting Kansas City	Major League Soccer	2011	6	1	0	0	6	1
Sporting Kansas City	Total		!32	4	0	0	32	4
Chivas USA	Major League Soccer	2012	21	0	0	0	21	0
Xanthi	Super League Greece	2012–13	12	0	0	0	12	0
Career Total			138	5	15	0	153	5
