= Graham Zusi =

American soccer player (born 1986)

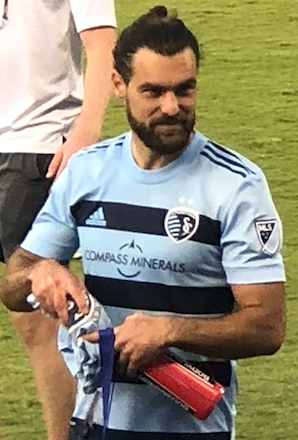
- Zusi with Sporting Kansas City in 2022

Personal information
- Full name: Graham Jonathan Zusi
- Date of birth: August 18, 1986 (age 40)
- Place of birth: Longwood, Florida, United States
- Height: 5 ft 10 in (1.78 m)
- Positions: Winger; right-back

College career
Years	Team	Apps	(Gls)
2005–2008	Maryland Terrapins	89	(28)

Senior career*
Years	Team	Apps	(Gls)
2005	Central Florida Kraze	10	(1)
2009–2023	Sporting Kansas City (Note: The club was known as the Kansas City Wizards prior to rebranding as Sporting Kansas City in 2011)	355	(31)
Total		365	(32)

International career
2012–2017	United States	55	(5)
Medal record
Representing United States
Men's Soccer
CONCACAF Gold Cup
Winner	CONCACAF Gold Cup	2017
- * Club domestic league appearances and goals

Graham Jonathan Zusi (/ˈzuːsi/; born August 18, 1986) is an American former professional soccer player who most recently played as a midfielder or defender for Major League Soccer club Sporting Kansas City. From 2012 to 2017, Zusi represented the United States national team, earning 55 caps and scoring 5 goals.

He is the longest-tenured player to have played with one club in MLS history (15 seasons with Sporting Kansas City).

== Early life and college ==
Born in Longwood, Florida, Zusi, alongside his siblings, was first coached by his father, David. He played high school soccer at Lake Brantley High School.

Zusi played college soccer for the Maryland Terrapins of the University of Maryland, College Park. During his college career with the Terrapins, Zusi played in 89 games, recording 28 goals and 20 assists, and helped Maryland win the National Championship in 2005 and 2008, scoring the game-winning goal in the 2008 National Semi-Final and Championship Games. He graduated with a degree in criminology.

== Club career ==
During his college years Zusi also played with Central Florida Kraze in the USL Premier Development League.

=== Sporting Kansas City ===
Zusi was drafted in the second round (23rd overall) of the 2009 MLS SuperDraft by the Kansas City Wizards. He made his professional debut on March 21, 2009, in Kansas City's first game of the 2009 MLS season against Toronto FC.

Zusi enjoyed a breakout season in 2011 helping the renamed Sporting Kansas City franchise to an Eastern Conference championship and earning a call-up to the U.S. national team. His efforts were rewarded by Sporting with a new four-year contract announced on February 16, 2012. In the 2012 season he led the league in assists with 15.

During the 2012–13 offseason, Zusi trialed with English Premier League side West Ham United.

Zusi returned to Sporting Kansas City and became a converted right-back, earning MLS All Star selections in 2016, 2017, and 2018, while helping guide Sporting Kansas City to the 2017 U.S. Open Cup title.

Zusi re-signed with the club for the 2022 season.

Zusi had his contract option declined by the club on December 1, 2023.

== International career ==
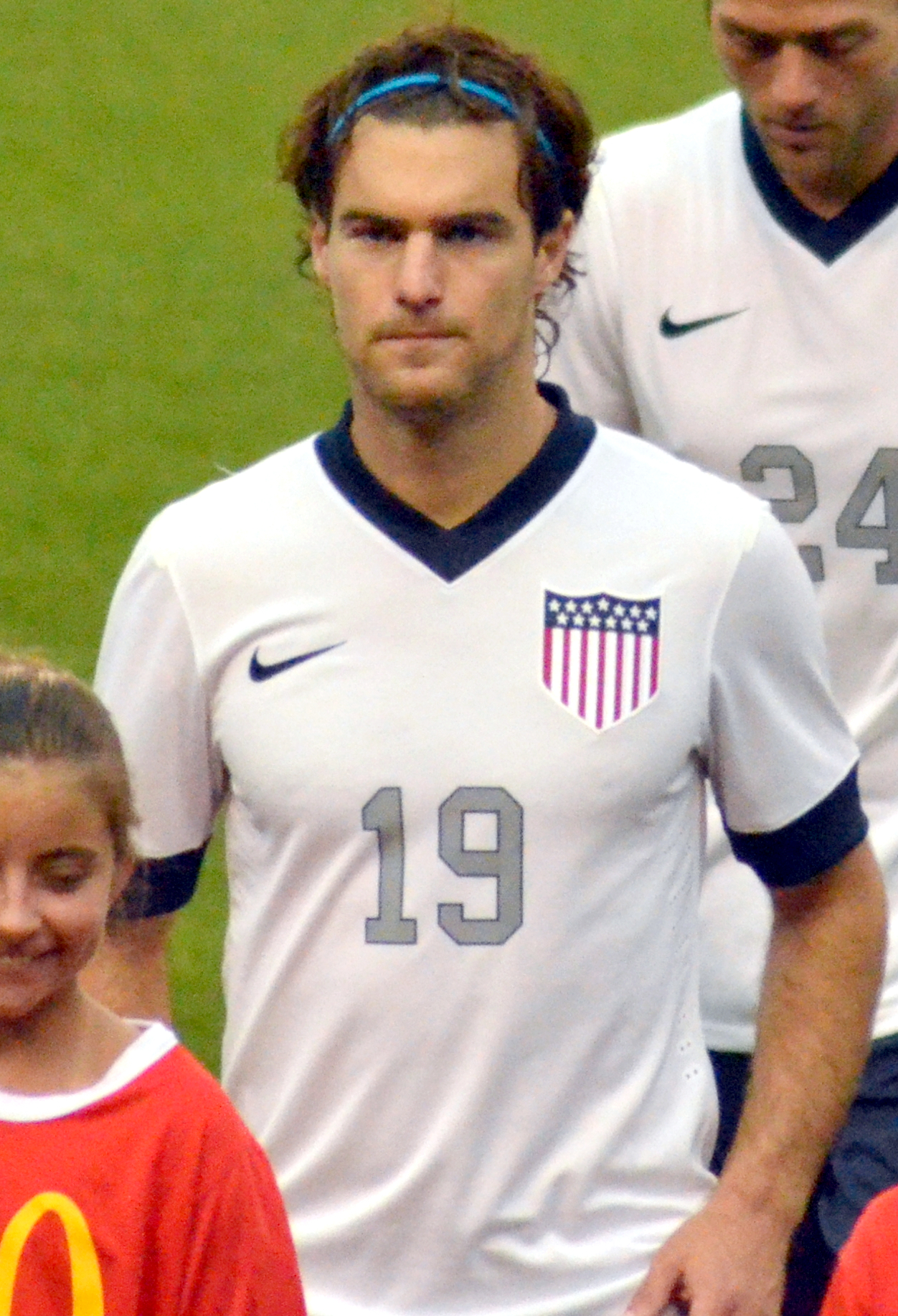
Zusi with the United States national team in 2013

On January 21, 2012, Zusi made his debut for the United States in a 1–0 win over Venezuela in a friendly match. He scored his first international goal on January 25, 2012, in the ninth minute against Panama in a 1–0 victory. Zusi was named to the national team's Hexagonal roster for the February 6, 2013 match against Honduras; he entered the game as a second-half substitute.

On October 15, 2013, Zusi scored a stoppage-time equalizer against Panama in a World Cup qualifier. Though the United States had already qualified, Zusi's goal meant that Mexico would advance to the next round at Panama's expense. As a result, a group of Mexico fans later presented Zusi with a framed photo and plaque with the words San Zusi ("Saint Zusi").

On June 16, 2014, in the United States' first game in the 2014 FIFA World Cup, Zusi provided the assist from a corner kick for John Brooks' game-winning goal in the 2–1 victory against Ghana. On June 22, 2014, in the United States' second game in the World Cup, Zusi provided the assist for Clint Dempsey's goal in the 2–2 draw against Portugal.

On March 29, 2016, going two years without scoring for the United States, Zusi scored the fourth goal against Guatemala in their campaign to qualify for the 2018 World Cup in Russia. Later that year, Zusi scored a late goal for the United States to put them up 4–0 against Costa Rica during the Copa América Centenario. His goal ensured that the 4–0 win over Costa Rica was the largest against Costa Rica in history for the national team.

Following the failure to qualify for the 2018 FIFA World Cup and Bruce Arena's departure, Zusi was not called into the team by Dave Sarachan and Gregg Berhalter.

== Career statistics ==
=== Club ===
As of match played November 26, 2023

Appearances and goals by club, season and competition
Club	Season	Major League Soccer			Playoffs			U.S. Open Cup			CONCACAF			Other		Total		
Club	Season	Apps	Goals	Assists	Apps	Goals	Assists	Apps	Goals	Assists	Apps	Goals	Assists	Apps	Goals	Apps	Goals	Assists
Kansas City Wizards	2009	13	0	1	—			2	0	0	—			—		15	0	1
Kansas City Wizards	2010	19	1	0	—			1	0	0	—			—		20	1	0
Sporting Kansas City	2011	32	5	7	3	0	2	4	0	1	—			—		39	5	10
Sporting Kansas City	2012	32	5	15	2	0	1	5	2	1	—			—		39	7	17
Sporting Kansas City	2013	27	6	8	5	0	2	—			3	0	2	—		35	6	12
Sporting Kansas City	2014	25	5	8	1	0	0	—			5	0	1	—		31	5	9
Sporting Kansas City	2015	25	2	5	1	0	1	2	1	1	—			—		27	2	7
Sporting Kansas City	2016	21	2	4	1	0	0	1	0	0	—			—		23	2	4
Sporting Kansas City	2017	24	0	8	1	0	0	3	0	2	—			—		28	0	10
Sporting Kansas City	2018	34	2	7	4	0	0	2	0	0	—			—		40	2	7
Sporting Kansas City	2019	27	0	2	—			1	0	0	5	0	0	—		33	0	2
Sporting Kansas City	2020	15 (Note: Includes three appearances and one goal in MLS is Back Tournament group stage)	1	1	—			—			—			2 (Note: Appearances in MLS is Back Tournament knockout stage)	0	17	1	1
Sporting Kansas City	2021	26	0	5	2	1	1	—			—			—		28	1	6
Sporting Kansas City	2022	21	2	2	—			1	0	0	—			—		22	2	2
Sporting Kansas City	2023	14	0	0	1	0	0	1	0	0	—			—		16	0	0
Career total		355	31	73	21	1	7	23	3	5	13	0	3	2	0	414	35	88

=== International ===
Appearances and goals by national team and year
National team	Year	Apps	Goals
United States	2012	6	1
United States	2013	12	2
United States	2014	10	0
United States	2015	4	0
United States	2016	10	2
United States	2017	12	0
Total		55	5

Scores and results list United States' goal tally first, score column indicates score after each Zusi goal.

List of international goals scored by Graham Zusi
No.	Date	Venue	Opponent	Score	Result	Competition
1	January 25, 2012	Estadio Rommel Fernández, Panama City, Panama	Panama	1–0	1–0	Friendly
2	October 11, 2013	Sporting Park, Kansas City, United States	Jamaica	1–0	2–0	2014 FIFA World Cup qualification
3	October 15, 2013	Estadio Rommel Fernández, Panama City, Panama	Panama	2–2	3–2	2014 FIFA World Cup qualification
4	March 29, 2016	MAPFRE Stadium, Columbus, United States	Guatemala	3–0	4–0	2018 FIFA World Cup qualification
5	June 7, 2016	Soldier Field, Chicago, United States	Costa Rica	4–0	4–0	Copa América Centenario

== Honors ==
Maryland Terrapins

- NCAA Men's Division I Soccer Championship: 2005, 2008

Sporting Kansas City

- MLS Cup: 2013
- U.S. Open Cup: 2012, 2015, 2017
- Eastern Conference (regular season): 2011, 2012
- Eastern Conference (playoffs): 2013
- Western Conference (regular season): 2018, 2020

United States

- CONCACAF Gold Cup: 2017

Individual

- MLS Breakout Player of the Year: 2011
- MLS Best XI: 2012, 2013
- MLS All-Star (7): 2012, 2013, 2014, 2015, 2017, 2018, 2019
- Sporting Kansas City Most Valuable Player: 2012, 2013
- MLS top assist provider: 2012
- CONCACAF Gold Cup Best XI: 2017

== See also ==
- List of one-club men in association football
