= Kei Kamara =

Sierra Leonean footballer (born 1984)

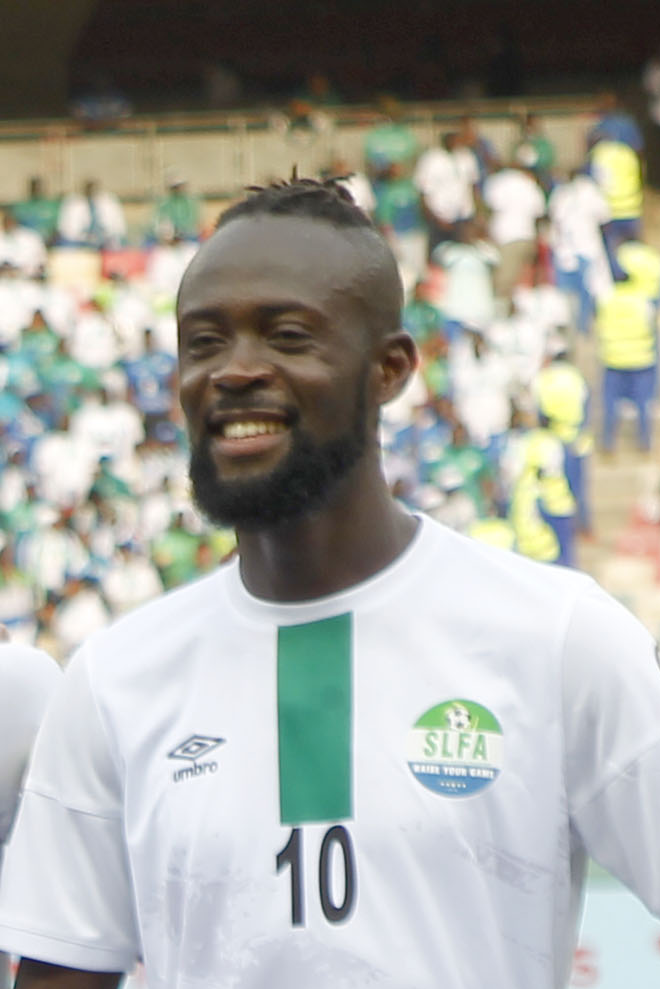
- Kamara with Sierra Leone in 2022

Personal information
- Full name: Kei Ansiu Kamara
- Date of birth: 1 September 1984 (age 42)
- Place of birth: Kenema, Sierra Leone
- Height: 6 ft 3 in (1.91 m)
- Position: Forward

Youth career
- 2001–2003: Kallon

College career
Years	Team	Apps	(Gls)
2004–2005	Cal State Dominguez Hills Toros	47	(31)

Senior career*
Years	Team	Apps	(Gls)
2004–2005	Orange County Blue Star	19	(16)
2006–2007	Columbus Crew	36	(5)
2008	San Jose Earthquakes	12	(2)
2008–2009	Houston Dynamo	32	(7)
2009–2013	Sporting Kansas City	113	(38)
2013	→ Norwich City (loan)	11	(1)
2013–2014	Middlesbrough	25	(4)
2015–2016	Columbus Crew	41	(27)
2016–2017	New England Revolution	52	(19)
2018	Vancouver Whitecaps	28	(14)
2019–2020	Colorado Rapids	38	(17)
2020	Minnesota United	7	(1)
2021	HIFK	14	(5)
2022	CF Montréal	32	(9)
2023	Chicago Fire	27	(5)
2024	Los Angeles FC	27	(3)
2025	FC Cincinnati	19	(0)
Total		533	(173)

International career
2008–2025	Sierra Leone	45	(8)
- * Club domestic league appearances and goals

Kei Ansu Kamara (/ˈkaɪ kəˈmɑːrə/; born 1 September 1984) is a Sierra Leonean former professional footballer who played as a striker. He is one of 13 players to have scored 100 goals in MLS history, achieving the landmark in 300 appearances for 12 clubs. Kamara ranks second on MLS's all-time scoring list, scoring for 11 different clubs.

== Early life and education ==
Kamara was born and raised in Kenema, Sierra Leone's third-largest city. He began playing football as a child, initially as a form of escapism from the Sierra Leone Civil War, in which he witnessed executions in his home city of Kenema, infiltrated early by rebels. At one point, he hid in the jungle and even spent two years in a refugee camp in the Gambia. At age 16, Kamara and his family migrated to the United States through a refugee program, initially moving to Maryland, before settling with relatives in Hawthorne, California, near Los Angeles. He became an American citizen in 2006. He began his career playing for Kallon from 2001 to 2003.

Kamara played college soccer at California State University, Dominguez Hills, where, in his second year, he was named third-team All-American. Kamara also spent two seasons with Orange County Blue Star in the USL Premier Development League.

== Club career ==
=== 2006–2009: Early MLS career ===
Kamara was chosen by Columbus Crew in the first round, ninth overall, at the 2006 MLS SuperDraft. He spent two seasons there, making 36 appearances and scoring five goals.

Prior to the 2008 season, he was traded to San Jose Earthquakes in exchange for Brian Carroll. However, he spent only the 2008 season there, making 12 appearances and scoring two goals.

On 24 July 2008, Kamara was traded to Houston Dynamo for a first-round pick in the 2009 MLS SuperDraft and allocation money. On 30 September 2008, Kamara scored two goals for MLS champion Houston Dynamo against Mexican club UNAM Pumas in a CONCACAF Champions League match.

=== Sporting Kansas City ===
On 15 September 2009, Kamara was traded to Sporting Kansas City for Abe Thompson and allocation money. Kamara had several productive seasons with Kansas City which saw him become one of the most imposing wingers in the league.

==== Loan to Norwich City ====
Kamara was a transfer target of Norwich City of the English Premier League during the winter 2013 transfer window, following an unsuccessful trial at Stoke City earlier in the off-season. It was announced on 30 January 2013 that Kamara was signed on loan by Norwich for the remainder of the 2012–13 Premier League season. Norwich had the option for a pre-negotiated permanent transfer or to return Kamara to Sporting at the end of the season, in which case Kamara would miss the first 10 matches of the MLS season. As part of the deal, Kamara's contract with Major League Soccer was extended. Norwich City announced on 5 February that Kamara was granted a visa, making him legally eligible to play for the club. He made his league debut for Norwich as an 86th-minute substitute in a 0–0 draw with Fulham four days later. On the next matchday, 23 February, he came on as a 58th-minute substitute, and 19 minutes later, scored his first goal for Norwich, equalising 1–1 against Everton with a powerful header at Carrow Road, in an eventual 2–1 victory.

Kamara did not score any more in a Norwich shirt and Norwich declined the option of taking him on a permanent transfer. On 4 May 2013, Norwich City confirmed the loan deal had ended and he would be returning to Sporting Kansas City immediately.

=== Middlesbrough ===
On 2 September 2013, it was confirmed that Kamara had signed for Middlesbrough of the Championship on a two-year contract for a fee of £900,000. He made his debut for the club twelve days later, coming on as a 63rd-minute substitute in a 1–3 loss to Ipswich Town. On 17 September, Kamara made his first start and scored his first goal for Boro in a 2–2 draw at Nottingham Forest. He followed up his first goal against Forest by scoring on his home debut, a 3–3 draw against AFC Bournemouth four days later. He then scored on 5 October in a 4–1 win at home to Yeovil Town, and twenty days later in a 4–0 home win at over Doncaster Rovers. On 28 August 2014, it was announced that Middlesbrough had parted company with Kamara as his contract had been cancelled by mutual consent.

After parting ways with Middlesbrough, Kamara had a successful trial with recently promoted Championship side Wolverhampton Wanderers. However, his work permit renewal application was declined after Sierra Leone fell to 75th place in the FIFA World Rankings and Wolverhampton shifted its focus to signing Yannick Sagbo instead.

=== Return to Columbus ===
In late August 2014, it was revealed that Kamara could return to MLS but would have to go through the league's allocation ranking system since Kansas City received a transfer fee for the player. At the time, the No. 1 spot in the allocation ranking was held by Columbus Crew SC, the club which initially drafted Kamara in 2006. On 7 October 2014, it was confirmed that Kamara had signed for Columbus and would officially be added to the roster on 1 January 2015. Because he was released by Middlesbrough after the 2014 MLS roster freeze, he would not be able to appear for the Crew until the 2015 Major League Soccer season.

The following season, Kamara helped the Crew to the play-offs by finishing second in the Eastern Conference, and finished the 2015 MLS season as the joint top-scorer of the league, alongside Toronto FC's Sebastian Giovinco, with 22 goals in 33 games, although the latter claimed the MLS Golden Boot due to having provided more assists throughout the season (16 compared to Kamara's 8). In November 2015, he was named one of the three finalists for both the 2015 MLS Landon Donovan MVP Award and the 2015 Advocare MLS WORKS Humanitarian of the Year Award; he was awarded the MLS Humanitarian of the Year Award on 5 November, although he missed out on the MVP Award, which went to Giovinco. On 8 November, he scored two goals in a 3–1 win over Montreal Impact in the Eastern Conference semi-finals of the MLS Playoffs, including the decisive goal in extra-time, which allowed Columbus Crew to advance to the Eastern Conference finals. On 22 November, he scored in the first leg of the 2015 MLS Playoff Eastern Conference Finals, a 2–0 win over the New York Red Bulls, which allowed Columbus to claim the 2015 Eastern Conference Championship 2–1 on aggregate and advance to the MLS Cup Final. Due to an injury sustained in training, however, it was initially uncertain whether Kamara would be able to feature in the 2015 MLS Cup Final against the Portland Timbers; nevertheless, he played all 90 minutes of the match, scoring the only goal for Columbus in a 2–1 defeat. With 4 goals, Kamara was the top-goalscorer in the 2015 MLS Playoffs, bringing his total seasonal tally to 26 goals although he missed out on the MLS Cup MVP Award, which went to Portland's Diego Valeri.

After being signed to a Designated Player contract, Columbus got off to a rough start in the 2016 season. Kamara scored five goals in his first nine games including a brace against Montreal on 7 May 2016 where Columbus had the lead. An argument arose between Federico Higuaín and Kamara over a penalty kick, with Kei potentially getting his first hat trick in his career; however, Higuaín wanted to take it himself. The game ended in a 4–4 draw. After the game, Kamara publicly called Higuaín out in an interview after the game. As a result, he was suspended by manager Gregg Berhalter for the next game.

=== New England Revolution ===
On 12 May 2016, just five days after the penalty kick incident with Higuaín, Kamara was traded to New England Revolution in a blockbuster deal which saw Columbus receive a first-round pick in the 2017 MLS SuperDraft, a second-round pick in the 2018 MLS SuperDraft, an international roster slot for the 2016 season, general allocation money, targeted allocation money, and a percentage of any fee received should New England transfer Kamara to a club outside of MLS.

Kamara made his debut for Revolution on 14 May 2016, in a 2–0 victory over the Chicago Fire. He scored his first goal for New England in a 2–1 win over the New York Cosmos in the 2016 U.S. Open Cup round of 16 on 29 June. He scored his first goal for the club in MLS play on 2 July, part of a brace in a 3–2 loss to the Montreal Impact. His first goal in the match was the 80th of his career, making him only the 16th player in MLS history to record 80 goals. Kamara concluded the 2016 season with 12 goals.

On 2 September 2017, Kamara scored his first MLS hat-trick against Orlando City in a 4–0 win. His first goal in the match was the 100th of his career, making him only the 12th player in MLS history to record 100 goals. He was named MLS Player of the Week for week 26. Kamara led the Revolution in scoring in the 2017 season, winning the club's golden boot with 12 goals and 5 assists.

=== Vancouver Whitecaps FC ===
On 10 December 2017, Kamara was traded by New England to Vancouver Whitecaps FC in exchange for a first-round selection in the 2019 MLS SuperDraft and a conditional second-round selection in the 2020 MLS SuperDraft. He scored on his debut on 4 March against Montreal Impact in a 2–1 win. Kamara left Vancouver at the end of their 2018 season when his contract expired.

=== Colorado Rapids ===
On 11 December 2018, Kamara was selected by FC Cincinnati in the 2018 MLS Expansion Draft and immediately traded to Colorado Rapids in exchange for an international roster slot for the 2019 season.

On 3 August 2019, Kamara scored the second hat-trick of his professional career in a 6–3 win over Montreal Impact, which saw him reach 11 league goals for the season, the most for a Rapids player since Omar Cummings in 2010.

=== Minnesota United ===
On 18 September 2020, Colorado traded Kamara to Minnesota United for allocation money and a 2022 second-round MLS SuperDraft pick. On 3 October 2020, he scored a penalty kick against FC Cincinnati, becoming the first MLS player to score for eight different teams; no one else has scored for more than six.

=== HIFK Fotboll ===
On 30 July 2021, Kamara signed with HIFK Fotboll in Finland through the end of the 2021 season, with an option for the 2022 season.

=== CF Montréal ===
In February 2022, Kamara returned to North America, joining CF Montréal on a one-year deal, with an option for 2023. He made his debut for his new club on 23 February against Santos Laguna of Liga MX in a 2022 CONCACAF Champions League match. On 2 April, Kamara scored his first goal for the club against FC Cincinnati, becoming the first MLS player to score for nine different teams, and also added a further two assists to help his side to a 4–3 win. On 20 August, Kamara scored his 135th MLS goal in a 4–0 win over New England Revolution, thus overtaking Jeff Cunningham as the third-highest scorer in MLS history; this was also his 11th career goal against the Revolution, becoming the club against which he has scored the most career goals. On 13 September, he scored a first-half brace against Chicago Fire, becoming his biggest victim (12 goals).

=== Chicago Fire ===
Kamara was traded to the Chicago Fire prior to the 2023 season. He was unhappy with CF Montreal's contract offer and had previously requested a trade. On 25 March, in his third appearance with the team, Kamara scored a late goal against Inter Miami to seal a 3–2 win, thus becoming the first player to score for 10 clubs in the MLS as well as the first player in MLS history to score in 16 different seasons. On 8 April, he scored a first-half brace against his former team Minnesota United FC to help his side to a 2–1 win, thus ending the Loon's 5-match unbeaten start. On 27 July, he scored another late winner from the bench, this time in his Leagues Cup debut against Minnesota United.

=== Los Angeles FC ===
On 29 March 2024, Kamara signed with Los Angeles FC for the 2024 season with a club option for 2025. In doing so, he became the oldest active player in the U.S. top flight, being only eight days older than Brad Guzan. On 8 May, Kamara scored his first goal for the club in a 3–1 win over Las Vegas Lights in the fourth round of the 2024 U.S. Open Cup, making him the only player to have scored for 11 different MLS teams during his career in the United States. On 19 June, Kamara scored his first MLS goal for the club to salvage a 1–1 draw with Austin FC. This was also his 145th MLS goal, tying with Landon Donovan for the second-most goals in MLS history. In the following match on 22 June, he scored his 146th MLS goal against San Jose Earthquakes to pass Donovan as the second-highest goalscorer in league history, only behind Chris Wondolowski (171). On 4 July, he opened the scoring against La Galaxy in an eventual 2–1 win at the Rose Bowl, and in doing so at the age of 39 years and 10 months, he became the oldest scorer in El Tráfico history.

Despite his advanced age, Kamara was one of the top scorers of the 2024 Leagues Cup with three goals, including one in both the quarterfinals and the semifinals. Thus, he contributed decisively to helping Los Angeles reach the Leagues Cup Final for the first time in its history, which they lost 3–1 to Columbus Crew. On 25 September, Kamara came off the bench in the 2024 U.S. Open Cup final against his former club Sporting Kansas City, for whom he had won his only Open Cup title in 2012. He scored a header in extra-time to seal a 3–1 win, and in doing so, at the age of 40 years and 24 days, he became both the oldest player and the oldest scorer in an Open Cup final since the inception of MLS in 1996.

=== FC Cincinnati ===
On 12 May 2025, FC Cincinnati announced Kamara's signing as a free agent to a contract through the 2025 season, with an option to extended it for another season. He thus became the oldest player of the squad by eight full years, sitting closer in age to coach Chris Albright (46) than to any of his teammates. On 14 May, he made his first appearance for the club, coming on as a substitute against Toronto FC. On 26 November, the team announced that they had declined Kamara's contract option.

On 4 May 2026, Kamara announced his retirement from professional football.

== International career ==
An international since 2008, Kamara was dropped from the national team set-up for "disciplinary reasons" in August 2019. He was recalled later that month. He retired from international duty in November 2019, blaming in part new manager Sellas Tetteh. Tetteh defended himself. Kamara later returned to the national team set-up and on 12 June 2021 Kamara scored the only goal for Sierra Leone in a victory against Benin which qualified Sierra Leone for the 2021 Africa Cup of Nations, their first since 1996.

On 21 April 2022, Kamara once again announced his retirement from international football. He came out of retirement for a second time in November 2024 at the age of 40 to play against Chad in Sierra Leone's penultimate 2025 Africa Cup of Nations qualification game.

== Personal life ==
Kamara earned his U.S. citizenship in 2006. He is married and has three children.

== Career statistics ==
=== Club ===
Appearances and goals by club, season and competition
Club	Season	League			National cup (Note: Includes U.S. Open Cup and Canadian Championship)		Continental		Other		Total	
Club	Season	Division	Apps	Goals	Apps	Goals	Apps	Goals	Apps	Goals	Apps	Goals
Orange County Blue Star	2004	PDL	5	4	—		—		1 (Note: Appearance in PDL play-offs)	1	6	5
Orange County Blue Star	2005	PDL	14	12			—				14	12
Orange County Blue Star	Total		19	16	0	0	0	0	1	1	20	17
Columbus Crew	2006	MLS	19	3	1	0	—		—		20	3
Columbus Crew	2007	MLS	17	2	1	0	—		—		18	2
Columbus Crew	Total		36	5	2	0	0	0	0	0	38	5
San Jose Earthquakes	2008	MLS	12	2	0	0	—		—		12	2
Houston Dynamo	2008	MLS	10	2	0	0	7 (Note: Two appearances and one goal in North American SuperLiga, five appearances and one goal in CONCACAF Champions League)	2	2 (Note: Appearances in MLS Cup playoffs)	1	19	5
Houston Dynamo	2009	MLS	22	5	3	0	3 (Note: Appearances in CONCACAF Champions League)	1	0	0	28	6
Houston Dynamo	Total		32	7	3	0	10	3	2	1	47	11
Kansas City Wizards/Sporting Kansas City	2009	MLS	6	1	0	0	0	0	—		6	1
Kansas City Wizards/Sporting Kansas City	2010	MLS	29	10	1	0	—		—		30	10
Kansas City Wizards/Sporting Kansas City	2011	MLS	30	9	2	1	—		3	0	35	10
Kansas City Wizards/Sporting Kansas City	2012	MLS	33	11	2	1	—		2	0	37	12
Kansas City Wizards/Sporting Kansas City	2013	MLS	15	7	1	1	0	0	0	0	16	8
Kansas City Wizards/Sporting Kansas City	Total		113	38	6	3	0	0	5	0	124	41
Norwich City (loan)	2012–13	Premier League	11	1	0	0	—		—		11	1
Middlesbrough	2013–14	Championship	25	4	0	0	—		—		25	4
Middlesbrough	2014–15	Championship	0	0	0	0	—		—		0	0
Middlesbrough	Total		25	4	0	0	0	0	0	0	25	4
Columbus Crew	2015	MLS	32	22	0	0	—		5	4	37	26
Columbus Crew	2016	MLS	9	5	0	0	—		—		9	5
Columbus Crew	Total		41	27	0	0	0	0	5	4	46	31
New England Revolution	2016	MLS	21	7	5	2	—		—		26	9
New England Revolution	2017	MLS	31	12	2	0	—		—		33	12
New England Revolution	Total		52	19	7	2	0	0	0	0	59	21
Vancouver Whitecaps FC	2018	MLS	28	14	3	3	—		—		31	17
Colorado Rapids	2019	MLS	29	14	0	0	—		—		29	14
Colorado Rapids	2020	MLS	9 (Note: Includes three appearances and one goal in MLS is Back Tournament group stage)	3	—		—		—		9	3
Colorado Rapids	Total		38	17	0	0	0	0	0	0	38	17
Minnesota United FC	2020	MLS	7	1	—		—		2	0	9	1
HIFK	2021	Veikkausliiga	14	5	0	0	—		—		14	5
CF Montréal	2022	MLS	32	9	2	0	3	0	2	0	39	9
Chicago Fire FC	2023	MLS	27	5	3	0	—		1 (Note: Appearance in Leagues Cup)	1	31	6
Los Angeles FC	2024	MLS	27	3	4	2	—		9 (Note: Six appearances and three goals in Leagues Cup, three appearances in MLS Cup playoffs)	3	40	8
FC Cincinnati	2025	MLS	19	0	—		—		3 (Note: Two appearances in Leagues Cup, one appearance in MLS Cup playoffs)	0	22	0
Career total			533	173	30	10	13	3	30	10	606	196

=== International ===
Appearances and goals by national team and year
National team	Year	Apps	Goals
Sierra Leone	2008	5	0
Sierra Leone	2009	0	0
Sierra Leone	2010	1	0
Sierra Leone	2011	4	0
Sierra Leone	2012	5	2
Sierra Leone	2013	3	0
Sierra Leone	2014	5	1
Sierra Leone	2015	1	0
Sierra Leone	2016	1	1
Sierra Leone	2017	1	0
Sierra Leone	2018	1	0
Sierra Leone	2019	2	1
Sierra Leone	2020	2	0
Sierra Leone	2021	5	2
Sierra Leone	2022	3	0
Sierra Leone	2023	0	0
Sierra Leone	2024	1	0
Sierra Leone	2025	5	1
Total		45	8

Scores and results list Sierra Leone's goal tally first, score column indicates score after each Kamara goal.

List of international goals scored by Kei Kamara
No.	Date	Venue	Opponent	Score	Result	Competition
1	16 June 2012	National Stadium, Freetown, Sierra Leone	São Tomé and Príncipe	1–1	4–2	2013 Africa Cup of Nations qualification
2	16 June 2012	National Stadium, Freetown, Sierra Leone	São Tomé and Príncipe	3–1	4–2	2013 Africa Cup of Nations qualification
3	6 September 2014	Stade Félix Houphouët-Boigny, Abidjan, Ivory Coast	Ivory Coast	1–0	1–2	2015 Africa Cup of Nations qualification
4	3 September 2016	Stade Bouaké, Bouaké, Ivory Coast	Ivory Coast	1–1	1–1	2017 Africa Cup of Nations qualification
5	8 September 2019	National Stadium, Freetown, Sierra Leone	Liberia	1–0	1–0	2022 FIFA World Cup qualification
6	15 June 2021	Stade du 28 Septembre, Conakry, Guinea	Benin	1–0	1–0	2021 Africa Cup of Nations qualification
7	9 October 2021	Stade El Abdi, El Jadida, Morocco	Gambia	1–1	2–1	Friendly
8	4 September 2025	Estádio 24 de Setembro, Bissau, Guinea-Bissau	Guinea-Bissau	1–0	1–1	2026 FIFA World Cup qualification

== Honours ==
Sporting Kansas City

- Eastern Conference (Regular Season): 2011, 2012
- U.S. Open Cup: 2012

Columbus Crew

- Eastern Conference (Playoffs): 2015

Los Angeles FC

- U.S. Open Cup: 2024

Individual

- MLS Fair Play Award: 2007
- Sierra Leonean Player of the Year: 2012
- MLS Joint Top-scorer: 2015 (22 goals, alongside Sebastian Giovinco)
- MLS All-Star: 2015, 2023
- MLS Works Humanitarian of the Year: 2015
- MLS Best XI: 2015
- MLS Cup Playoffs Top-scorer: 2015
- MLS 100 goals club
- MLS 400 Games Club
