= Nikos Kounenakis =

Greek-South African footballer

Personal information
- Full name: Nikolaos Kounenakis
- Date of birth: 3 February 1978 (age 48)
- Place of birth: Port Elizabeth, South Africa
- Height: 6 ft 1 in (1.85 m)
- Positions: Centre back; defensive midfielder

Youth career
- –1994: OFI

Senior career*
Years	Team	Apps	(Gls)
1994–1999	OFI	39	(0)
1999–2001	Anderlecht	0	(0)
2001–2003	Roda JC	0	(0)
2003–2009	OFI	104	(4)
2009–2010	Aris Limassol	17	(0)
2010	Kansas City Wizards	0	(0)

Managerial career
- 2013: OFI (assistant)
- 2014–2015: Montreal Impact (assistant)
- 2015–2016: ŠK Slovan Bratislava (assistant and analyst)
- * Club domestic league appearances and goals as of 18 November 2010

Nikos Kounenakis (Greek: Νίκος Κουνενάκης; born 3 February 1978) is a Greek-South African retired footballer.

Nikos Kounenakis (Greek: Νίκος Κουνενάκης; born 3 February 1978) is a Greek-South African retired footballer.

Kounenakis spent the majority of his playing career with Greek club OFI, making 174 competitive appearances across two spells between 1994 and 2009. Following the 1998–99 season, he transferred to Belgian champions R.S.C. Anderlecht, before later joining Dutch club Roda JC. He returned to OFI in 2003 and captained the club from 2007 until his departure in 2009.

== Playing career ==
=== OFI ===
At age 17, on 5 March 1995, Kounenakis made his Alpha Ethniki debut, in a 2–1 loss away to Olympiacos

Kounenakis made his debut in European competition on 15 July 1995 in the UEFA Intertoto Cup in a 2–0 victory over Estonian side Tervis Pärnu. During the 1995 Intertoto Cup Kounenakis also made appearances in a 1–0 loss away to German club Bayer Leverkusen and a 2–1 win over Cypriot club Nea Salamina, as OFI advanced from Group 7, along with Leverkusen, to the round of 16, where OFI was ultimately eliminated by Turkish club Bursaspor, with a 2–1 loss in Turkey.

Kounenakis made his first appearance in the UEFA Cup (now called Europa League) on 12 August 1997 in a 0–0 draw away to Icelandic club KR Reykjavík. During the 1997–98 UEFA Cup Kounenakis made 5 total appearances through the second round of the competition, where OFI was eliminated by French club Auxerre, 5–4 on aggregate. In the first round of the competition, on 19 September 1997, Kounenakis scored his first and only goal in European competition, in a 3–0 victory over Hungarian club Ferencváros.

During Kounenakis' first five seasons with OFI, from 1994–95 through 1998–99, the Cretan club finished in the top half of the Greek table each season, reaching as high as 3rd place in 1996–97.

At age 21, following the 1998–99 season, Kounenakis earned a transfer to Belgium's Anderlecht.

=== Anderlecht and Roda JC ===
Kounenakis spent a season and a half in the Belgian First Division with Anderlecht, and then transferred to Dutch Eredivisie club Roda JC, where he spent parts of three seasons.

During his time abroad, nothing seemed to go Kounenakis' way. A knee injury kept him out of action for most of his short time with Anderlecht, and a coaching carousel at Roda did not work out in his favor, following the dismissal of Sef Vergoossen, who had approved his arrival during a trial period with the Dutch club.

Anderlecht won the Belgian First Division in 1999-00, earning Kounenakis and his fellow countryman at Anderlecht Yannis Anastasiou the distinction of being the first Greeks to win a championship abroad.

=== Return to OFI ===
In the middle of the 2002–03 season Kounenakis returned to OFI, and thereafter he rediscovered his form. In 2004–05 Kounenakis made 24 appearances in all competitions, scoring one goal, and firmly re-established himself at his old club. From the time of his return to OFI in 2003 through the 2008–09 season Kounenakis made 125 appearances (116 starts) and scored four goals in all competitions. Kounenakis' first career goal in league competition came on 16 March 2003 in a 1–1 draw away to Aris.

In 2007–08 Kounenakis helped OFI make its best run in the Greek Cup in recent years, reaching the quarterfinals of the competition, where they were eliminated by Atromitos, 4–3 on aggregate. In the fifth round of the competition, in a replay against Agrotikos Asteras, Kounenakis registered two assists in a resounding 5–0 win.

At the end of the 2008–09 season OFI was relegated from the top flight for the first time in 33 years, and in the offseason OFI agreed to release Kounenakis from his contract so that he could continue his career elsewhere.

Overall, in his 11 1/2 seasons with OFI, Kounenakis made 174 appearances and scored five goals in all competitions.

Kounenakis was OFI's team captain from 2007 to 2009.

=== Aris Limassol ===
After OFI's relegation, Kounenakis signed a 1-year contract with Cypriot club Aris Limassol.

=== Kansas City Wizards ===
Kounenakis signed with Major League Soccer side Kansas City Wizards on 18 July 2010. However, he was released by the club soon after the end of the 2010 MLS season without making a first team appearance.

== Managerial career ==
In January 2013, Kounenakis returned to OFI as an assistant coach, helping Giannis Petrakis' staff avoid relegation in the Greek Super League.

On 3 February 2014, Kounenakis joined Montreal Impact of Major League Soccer as assistant coach under Frank Klopas. During his tenure, Montreal won the 2014 Canadian Championship and reached the final of the 2014–15 CONCACAF Champions League, becoming the first Canadian club to reach the competition's final.

In August 2015, Kounenakis joined ŠK Slovan Bratislava as assistant coach and analyst to Nikodimos Papavasiliou. During the 2015–16 season, Slovan Bratislava finished runners-up in both the Slovak Super Liga and the Slovak Cup.

== Honours ==
=== As assistant coach ===
Montreal Impact

- Canadian Championship: 2014
- CONCACAF Champions League runner-up: 2014–15

ŠK Slovan Bratislava

- Slovak Super Liga runner-up: 2015–16
- Slovak Cup runner-up: 2015–16
