= Chance Myers =

American soccer player

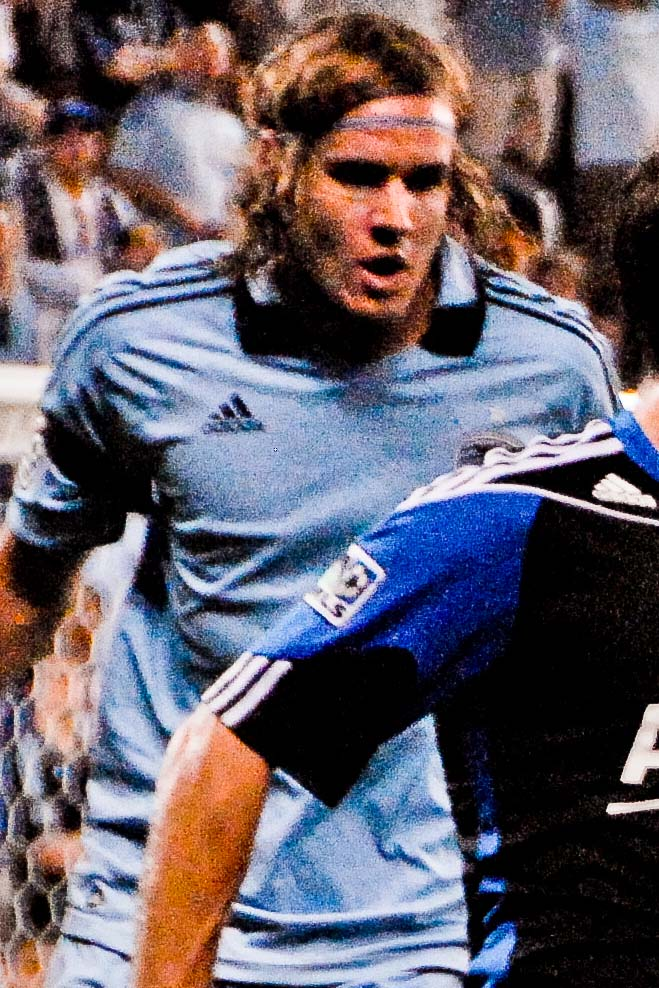

Personal information
- Full name: Chance Russell Myers
- Date of birth: December 7, 1987 (age 38)
- Place of birth: Thousand Oaks, California, United States
- Height: 6 ft 0 in (1.83 m)
- Position: Full back

Youth career
- 1998–2004: Real So Cal
- 2004–2006: Pateadores
- 2006–2007: UCLA Bruins

Senior career*
Years	Team	Apps	(Gls)
2007	Ventura County Fusion	12	(0)
2008–2016	Sporting Kansas City	147	(2)
2016	→ Swope Park Rangers (loan)	1	(0)
2017	Portland Timbers	1	(0)
2017	→ Portland Timbers 2 (loan)	2	(0)
Total		163	(2)

International career^{‡}
2007	United States U18	3	(0)
2006–2008	United States U20	3	(0)
2008	United States U23	1	(0)
- * Club domestic league appearances and goals as of October 25, 2017 ‡ National team caps and goals as of October 26, 2012

Chance Russell Myers (born December 7, 1987, in Thousand Oaks, California) is an American former soccer player.

== Career ==
=== College and amateur ===
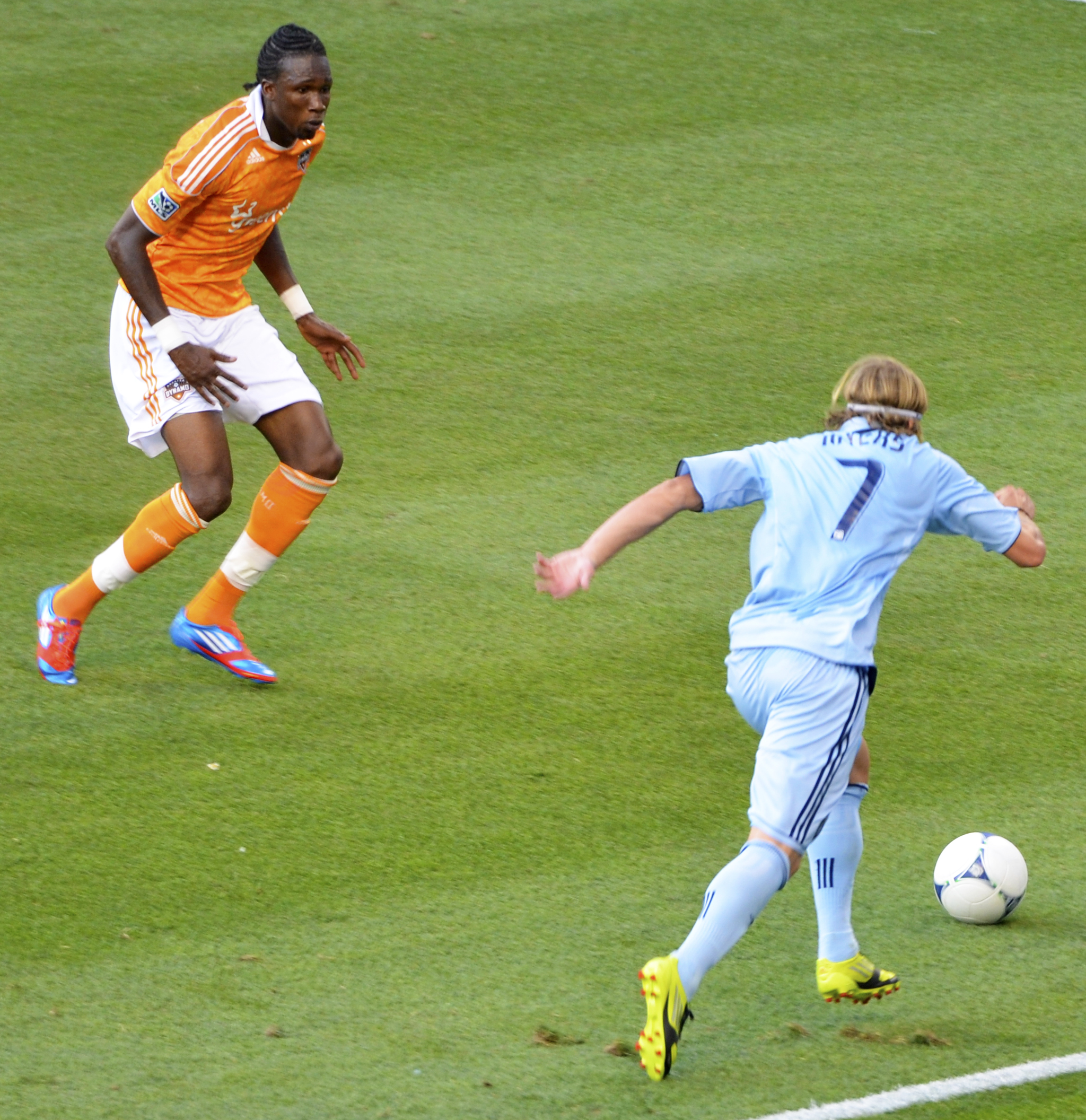
Chance Myers pushes up the wing versus Houston on July 7th, 2012 at Livestrong Sporting Park

Myers attended Thousand Oaks High School, and played college soccer at UCLA from 2006 to 2007. Over two years he started in 26 of his 42 appearances and managed 4 goals and 4 assists. During his college years he also played in the USL Premier Development League with Ventura County Fusion.

=== Professional ===
Leaving school early, Myers was drafted with the first overall pick of the 2008 MLS SuperDraft by Kansas City Wizards and signed for $130,000. He made his MLS debut on April 9, 2008, against the New England Revolution, but struggled to maintain a consistent place in the starting lineup due to a series of injuries and a new diagnosis of asthma.

It was announced on November 18, 2010, that Myers would graduate from the MLS Generation Adidas program at the end of the 2010 season. He scored his first two professional goals on May 25, 2011, in a 5–0 win over New England Revolution in the 2011 Lamar Hunt U.S. Open Cup.

After his release from Kansas City at the end of 2016 season, Myers signed with Portland Timbers as a free agent on January 23, 2017.

Myers was waived by the Timbers on February 28, 2018.

== Post-retirement ==
In 2019, Myers joined Nashville SC as the team's chief scout.

== Honors ==
=== Sporting Kansas City ===
- Lamar Hunt U.S. Open Cup: 2012
- Major League Soccer MLS Cup Champion (1): 2013
