= Pablo Escobar (footballer, born 1987) =

Colombian footballer

Personal information
- Full name: Pablo Andrés Escobar Valencia
- Date of birth: 12 February 1987 (age 39)
- Place of birth: Florida, Valle del Cauca, Colombia
- Height: 6 ft 0 in (1.83 m)
- Position: Centre back

Team information
- Current team: Real Cartagena

Senior career*
Years	Team	Apps	(Gls)
2005–2008	Deportes Quindío	67	(0)
2009–2012	Deportivo Cali	26	(1)
2010	→ Kansas City Wizards (loan)	7	(0)
2010	→ Plaza Colonia (loan)	7	(2)
2012–2013	Atlético Huila	16	(0)
2013–2014	Patriotas	10	(0)
2014–2016	Cúcuta Deportivo	49	(1)
2016	Jaguares Córdoba	4	(0)
2017	Real Cartagena	25	(2)
2018	Deportes Quindio	29	(0)
2020–	Real Cartagena	7	(0)
- * Club domestic league appearances and goals as of 18:35, 8 June 2020 (UTC)

Pablo Andrés Escobar Valencia (born 12 February 1987) is a Colombian footballer who currently plays for Real Cartagena.

== Career ==
Escobar began his career in his native Colombia with Deportes Quindío, and made 67 appearances for the team in the Colombian Categoría Primera A before moving to Deportivo Cali in 2009.

He joined the Kansas City Wizards of Major League Soccer in January 2010. However, he was released by the Wizards on 2 July 2010 to make way for the signing of Shavar Thomas from Philadelphia Union.
