= Birahim Diop =

Senegalese footballer

Personal information
- Full name: Birahim Diop
- Date of birth: February 7, 1979 (age 47)
- Place of birth: Thiès, Senegal
- Height: 1.91 m (6 ft 3 in)
- Positions: Midfielder; forward

Senior career*
Years	Team	Apps	(Gls)
1999–2000	US Rail	25	(15)
2000–2001	ASC Jeanne d'Arc		(12)
2001–2002	MetroStars	4	(0)
2003–2005	Deportivo Pereira	4	(0)
2006–2008	CS Tiligul-Tiras Tiraspol	20	(3)
2010–2012	Sporting Kansas City	32	(5)
- * Club domestic league appearances and goals as of August 26, 2011

Birahim Diop (born February 7, 1979, in Thiès) is a Senegalese footballer.

== Club career ==
Diop began his career in Senegal with US Rail de Thiès. In one year at the club he appeared in 25 matches scoring 15 goals. Diop then moved to ASC Jeanne d'Arc and scored 12 goals and added 7 assists in his one year at the club. In 2001, Diop moved to the United States and joined the MetroStars reserve squad. After impressing coach Octavio Zambrano, Diop moved up to the senior squad; he appeared in four league matches in 2002. Following his stay in New York, Diop would join Colombian side Deportivo Pereira, before being re-united once again with coach Zambrano at CS Tiligul-Tiras Tiraspol in Moldova. In his first season with CS Tiligul-Tiras Tiraspol, Diop appeared in 15 league matches; he scored three goals playing as a holding midfielder. In 2008, Diop returned to the United States and played for FDR United in New York City's amateur leagues, scoring 19 goals in 25 matches.

On March 17, 2010, Kansas City Wizards officially announced the signing of Diop, as an addition to their midfield. Diop was reunited with coach Octavio Zambrano, an assistant for Kansas City who was instrumental in bringing Diop back to Major League Soccer. Diop scored his first two MLS goals on August 21, 2010, in a 4–1 victory over New England Revolution. Diop then recorded the first hat trick of his career on October 23, 2010, in a 4–1 victory over San Jose Earthquakes. Diop enjoyed his best year in Major League soccer in 2010 with Kansas City Wizards appearing in 14 league matches and scoring five goals.

Diop was waived by Kansas City on March 26, 2012.

== Personal ==
Diop has a U.S. green card, granting him permanent residence in the United States and qualifying him as a domestic player for MLS roster purposes.
