= List of Major League Soccer players with 100 or more goals =

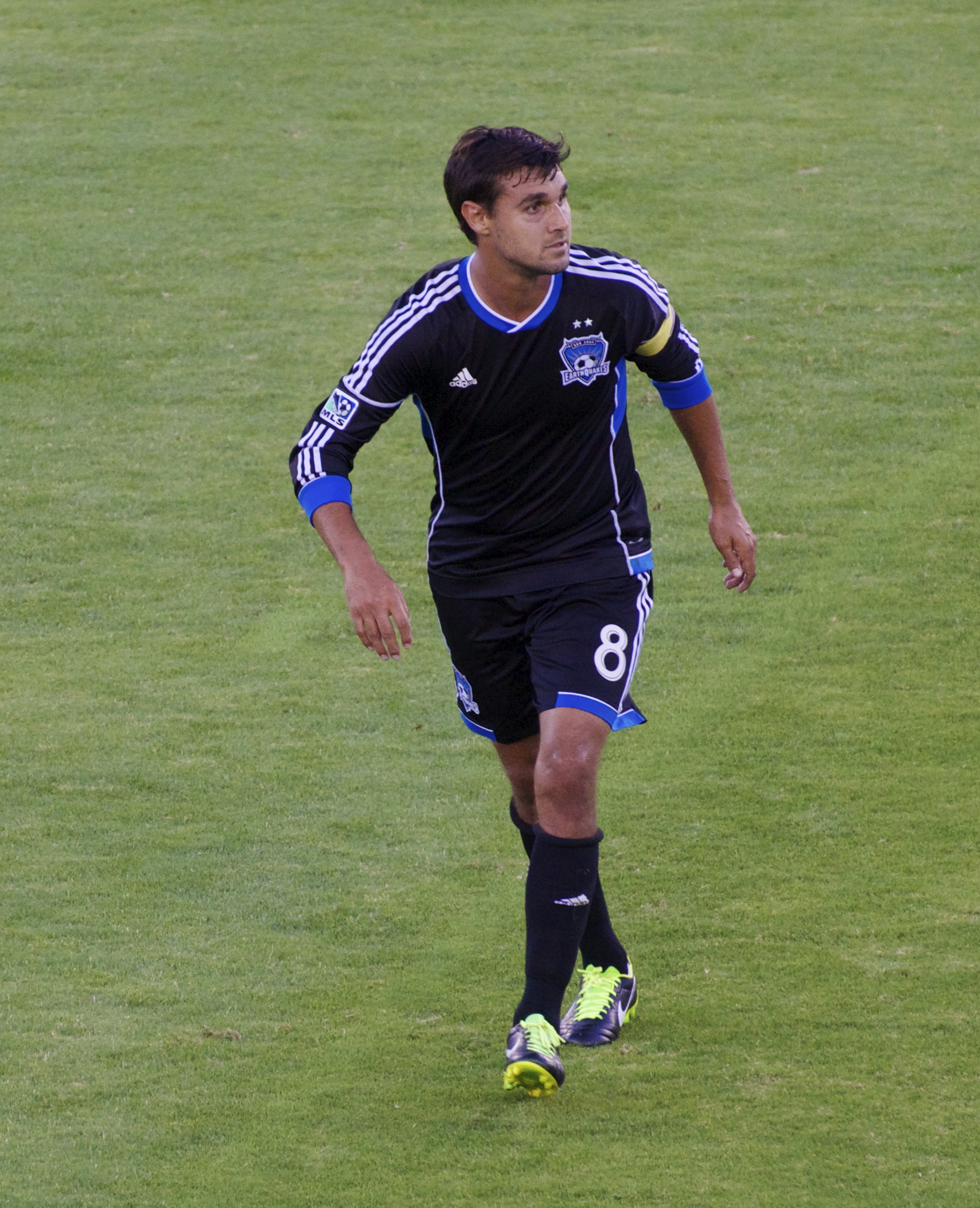
Chris Wondolowski became the MLS all-time leading goalscorer on May 18, 2019.

This is a list of players who scored over 100 goals in Major League Soccer, the top flight men's soccer league of the United States and Canada, dating back to its inaugural season in 1996. This list does not include goals scored in the MLS Cup playoffs. Thirteen players have reached the milestone.

The first MLS player to reach 100 goals was Jason Kreis on August 13, 2005, with his goal in Real Salt Lake's 4–2 loss to the Kansas City Wizards (now Sporting Kansas City). On August 22, 2007, Jaime Moreno took the record from Kreis with his 109th goal, a penalty in a 3–1 win over his former team the New York Red Bulls. Moreno retired in 2010 with 133 goals and held the record until August 27, 2011, when Jeff Cunningham scored his final MLS goal for Columbus Crew SC in their 6–2 defeat at Seattle Sounders FC. On May 25, 2014, Landon Donovan broke the record with his 135th goal in a 4–1 Los Angeles Galaxy win over the Philadelphia Union; he retired in 2016 with 145 goals. The record was subsequently broken on May 18, 2019, as Chris Wondolowski scored his 146th goal in a 4–1 win for the San Jose Earthquakes over the Chicago Fire.

Of the thirteen players, eight are Americans and one, Dwayne De Rosario, is Canadian. The highest-scoring foreigner is Kei Kamara of Sierra Leone, with 147 goals. Kamara moved to the U.S. as a refugee at 16 and attended high school and college in the U.S. before turning pro. Jaime Moreno of Bolivia and Bradley Wright-Phillips of England are the highest scoring players from South America and Europe respectively.

== List ==
- **Bold** shows players still playing in Major League Soccer.

As of November 9, 2026

Rank	Player	Goals	Apps	Ratio	First	Last	Club(s) (goals/apps)
1	(United States) Chris Wondolowski	171	413	0.41	2005	2021	Houston Dynamo (4/37), San Jose Earthquakes (167/374)
2	(Sierra Leone) Kei Kamara	147	464	0.32	2006	2025	Columbus Crew (32/77), San Jose Earthquakes (2/12), Houston Dynamo (7/32), Sporting Kansas City (38/113), New England Revolution (19/52), Vancouver Whitecaps FC (14/28), Colorado Rapids (17/38), Minnesota United FC (1/7), CF Montréal (9/32), Chicago Fire FC (5/27), Los Angeles FC (3/27), FC Cincinnati (0/19)
3	(United States) Landon Donovan	145	340	0.43	2001	2016	San Jose Earthquakes (32/87), LA Galaxy (113/253)
4	(United States) Jeff Cunningham	134	365	0.37	1998	2011	Columbus Crew (64/203), Colorado Rapids (12/26), Real Salt Lake (19/38), Toronto FC (6/32), FC Dallas (33/66)
5	(Bolivia) Jaime Moreno	133	340	0.39	1996	2010	D.C. United (131/329), MetroStars (2/11)
6	**(Venezuela) Josef Martínez**	131	226	0.58	2017	2026	Atlanta United FC (98/134), Inter Miami CF (7/27), CF Montréal (11/23), San Jose Earthquakes (14/30), **Columbus Crew** (1/12)
7	(England) Bradley Wright-Phillips	117	234	0.50	2013	2021	New York Red Bulls (108/195), Los Angeles FC (8/18), Columbus Crew (1/21)
8	(United States) Ante Razov	114	262	0.44	1996	2008	LA Galaxy (1/6), Chicago Fire FC (76/155), Columbus Crew (1/7), MetroStars (6/18), Chivas USA (30/76)
9	(United States) Jason Kreis	108	305	0.35	1996	2007	Dallas Burn (91/247), Real Salt Lake (17/58)
10	(United States) Gyasi Zardes	106	328	0.32	2013	2024	LA Galaxy (34/131), Columbus Crew (54/110), Colorado Rapids (9/26), Austin FC (9/61)
11	(Canada) Dwayne De Rosario	104	343	0.30	2001	2014	San Jose Earthquakes (27/108), Houston Dynamo (24/78), Toronto FC (28/76), New York Red Bulls (2/13), D.C. United (23/68)
12	(United States) Taylor Twellman	101	174	0.58	2002	2010	New England Revolution
13	(United States) Edson Buddle	100	304	0.33	2001	2015	Columbus Crew (42/106), New York Red Bulls (6/28), Toronto FC (0/10), LA Galaxy (45/118), Colorado Rapids (7/42)

== See also ==
- List of Major League Soccer players with 400 or more games played
- Major League Soccer records and statistics
- Major League Soccer attendance
