= List of Major League Soccer players with 400 or more games played =

This is a list of players who have appeared in 400 or more games in Major League Soccer, the top flight men's soccer league of the United States and Canada, dating back to its inaugural season in 1996. This list does not include appearances in the MLS Cup playoffs.

== List ==
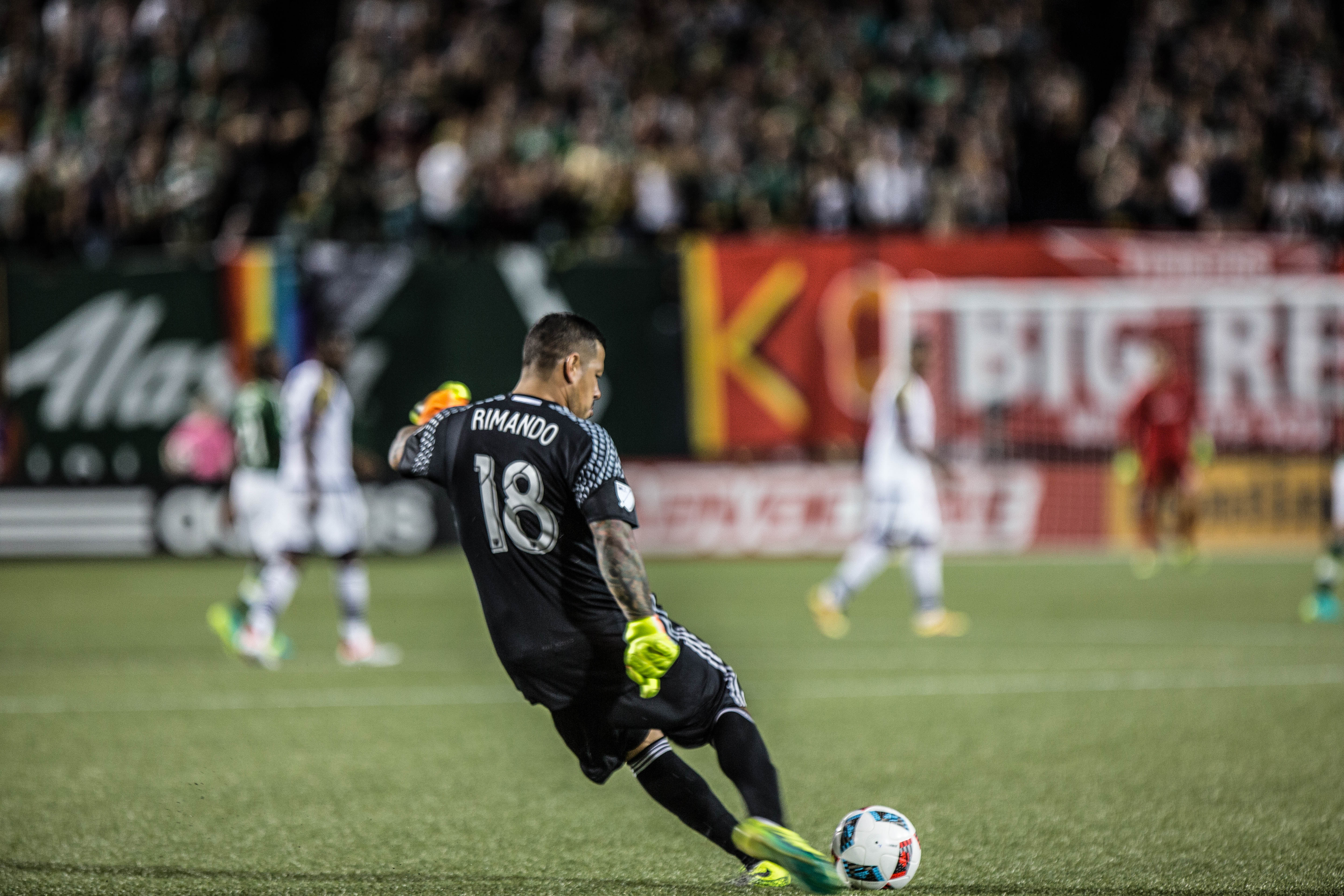
The all-time leader in games played, Nick Rimando is a 6× MLS All-Star and 3× winner of the MLS Save of the Year Award. He earned 22 caps with the US Men's National Team and was selected to the 2014 FIFA World Cup squad.

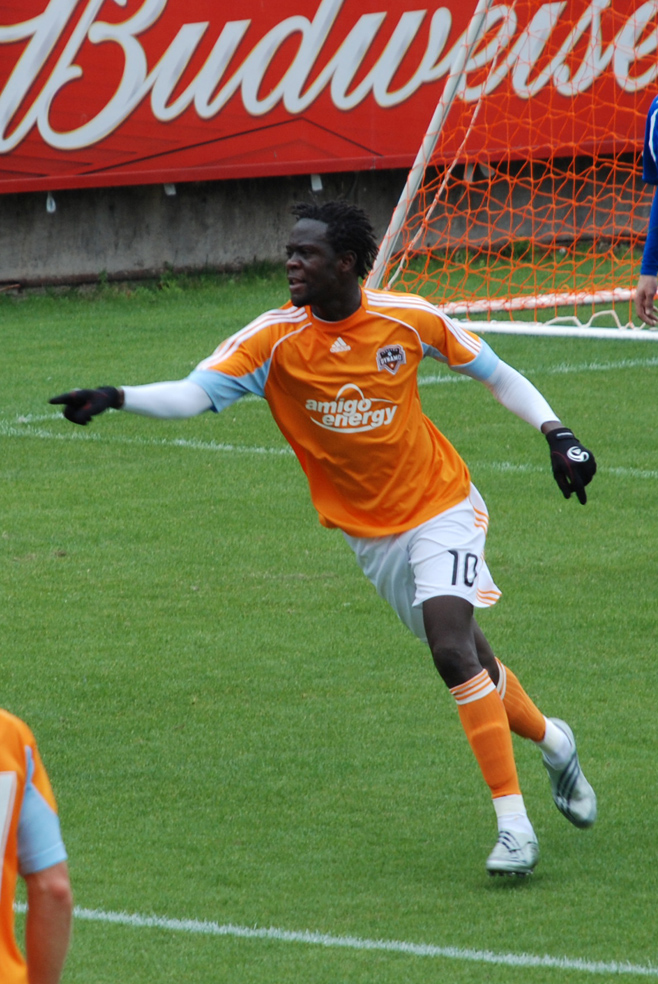
Kei Kamara has the most appearances for a foreign player and has played for the most different clubs (12) in MLS. He currently ranks 2nd all-time in MLS goals scored.

- Current Major League Soccer players and their current clubs are shown in **bold**.

As of November 9, 2026

Rank	Player	Apps	First	Last	Clubs (apps)	Ref.
1	(United States) Nick Rimando	514	2000	2019	Miami Fusion (47), D.C. United (98), Real Salt Lake (389)	
2	(United States) Kyle Beckerman	498	2000	2020	Miami Fusion (3), Colorado Rapids (145), Real Salt Lake (350)	
3	(United States) Dax McCarty	488	2006	2024	FC Dallas (93), DC United (13), New York Red Bulls (169), Chicago Fire FC (86), Nashville SC (105), Atlanta United FC (22)	
4	(Sierra Leone) Kei Kamara	464	2006	2025	Columbus Crew (77), San Jose Earthquakes (12), Sporting Kansas City (113), Houston Dynamo (32), New England Revolution (52), Vancouver Whitecaps FC (28), Colorado Rapids (38), Minnesota United FC (7), CF Montréal (32), Chicago Fire FC (27), Los Angeles FC (27), FC Cincinnati (19)	
5	**(United States) Sean Johnson**	462	2010	2026	Chicago Fire FC (176), New York City FC (179), Toronto FC (76), **D.C. United** (31)	
6	**(Colombia) Diego Chará**	453	2011	2026	**Portland Timbers** (453)	
7	(United States) Darlington Nagbe	445	2011	2025	Portland Timbers (214), Atlanta United FC (56), Columbus Crew (175)	
8	**(Uruguay) Diego Fagúndez**	443	2011	2026	**New England Revolution** (280), Austin FC (86), LA Galaxy (77)	
9	(United States) Jeff Larentowicz	437	2005	2020	New England Revolution (111), Colorado Rapids (96), Chicago Fire FC (94), LA Galaxy (23), Atlanta United FC (113)	
10	**(Switzerland) Stefan Frei**	433	2009	2025	Toronto FC (82), **Seattle Sounders FC** (351)	
11	(United States) Kevin Hartman	416	1997	2012	LA Galaxy (243), Sporting Kansas City (90), FC Dallas (83)	
11	(United States) Teal Bunbury	416	2010	2025	Sporting Kansas City (89), New England Revolution (231), Nashville SC (96)	
13	(United States) Chris Wondolowski	413	2005	2021	San Jose Earthquakes (376), Houston Dynamo (37)	
14	(United States) Drew Moor	411	2005	2022	FC Dallas (123), Colorado Rapids (210), Toronto FC (78)	
15	(United States) Chad Marshall	409	2004	2019	Columbus Crew (253), Seattle Sounders FC (156)	

== See also ==
- List of Major League Soccer players with 100 or more goals
- Major League Soccer records and statistics
- Major League Soccer attendance
