= Major League Soccer records and statistics =

Several Major League Soccer teams and players hold various records and statistics.

== MLS Cup and Supporters' Shield winners ==
Season	MLS Cup Winners	MLS Cup Runners-up	Supporters' Shield Winners	Supporters' Shield Runners-up
1996	D.C. United	Los Angeles Galaxy	Tampa Bay Mutiny	Los Angeles Galaxy
1997	D.C. United (2)	Colorado Rapids	D.C. United	Kansas City Wizards
1998	Chicago Fire	D.C. United	Los Angeles Galaxy	D.C. United
1999	D.C. United (3)	Los Angeles Galaxy	D.C. United (2)	Los Angeles Galaxy
2000	Kansas City Wizards	Chicago Fire	Kansas City Wizards	Chicago Fire
2001	San Jose Earthquakes	Los Angeles Galaxy	Miami Fusion	Chicago Fire
2002	Los Angeles Galaxy	New England Revolution	Los Angeles Galaxy (2)	San Jose Earthquakes
2003	San Jose Earthquakes (2)	Chicago Fire	Chicago Fire	San Jose Earthquakes
2004	D.C. United (4)	Kansas City Wizards	Columbus Crew	Kansas City Wizards
2005	Los Angeles Galaxy (2)	New England Revolution	San Jose Earthquakes	New England Revolution
2006	Houston Dynamo	New England Revolution	D.C. United (3)	FC Dallas
2007	Houston Dynamo (2)	New England Revolution	D.C. United (4)	Chivas USA
2008	Columbus Crew	New York Red Bulls	Columbus Crew	Houston Dynamo
2009	Real Salt Lake	Los Angeles Galaxy	Columbus Crew (2)	Los Angeles Galaxy
2010	Colorado Rapids	FC Dallas	Los Angeles Galaxy (3)	Real Salt Lake
2011	Los Angeles Galaxy (3)	Houston Dynamo	Los Angeles Galaxy (4)	Seattle Sounders FC
2012	Los Angeles Galaxy (4)	Houston Dynamo	San Jose Earthquakes (2)	Sporting Kansas City
2013	Sporting Kansas City (2)	Real Salt Lake	New York Red Bulls	Sporting Kansas City
2014	Los Angeles Galaxy (5)	New England Revolution	Seattle Sounders FC	Los Angeles Galaxy
2015	Portland Timbers	Columbus Crew SC	New York Red Bulls (2)	FC Dallas
2016	Seattle Sounders FC	Toronto FC	FC Dallas	Colorado Rapids
2017	Toronto FC	Seattle Sounders FC	Toronto FC	New York City FC
2018	Atlanta United FC	Portland Timbers	New York Red Bulls (3)	Atlanta United FC
2019	Seattle Sounders FC (2)	Toronto FC	Los Angeles FC	New York City FC
2020	Columbus Crew SC (2)	Seattle Sounders FC	Philadelphia Union	Toronto FC
2021	New York City FC	Portland Timbers	New England Revolution	Colorado Rapids
2022	Los Angeles FC	Philadelphia Union	Los Angeles FC (2)	Philadelphia Union
2023	Columbus Crew (3)	Los Angeles FC	FC Cincinnati	Orlando City SC
2024	Los Angeles Galaxy (6)	New York Red Bulls	Inter Miami CF	Columbus Crew
2025	Inter Miami CF	Vancouver Whitecaps FC	Philadelphia Union (2)	FC Cincinnati
2026			Nashville SC	Vancouver Whitecaps FC

== MLS Cup finals ==
Season	Winners	Result	Runners-up	Venue
1996; Details	D.C. United	3–2 (a.e.t.)	Los Angeles Galaxy	Foxboro Stadium, Foxborough, MA
1997; Details	D.C. United (2)	2–1	Colorado Rapids	Robert F. Kennedy Memorial Stadium, Washington, D.C.
1998; Details	Chicago Fire	2–0	D.C. United	Rose Bowl, Pasadena, CA
1999; Details	D.C. United (3)	2–0	Los Angeles Galaxy	Foxboro Stadium, Foxborough, MA
2000; Details	Kansas City Wizards	1–0	Chicago Fire	Robert F. Kennedy Memorial Stadium, Washington, D.C.
2001; Details	San Jose Earthquakes	2–1 (a.e.t.)	Los Angeles Galaxy	Columbus Crew Stadium, Columbus, OH
2002; Details	Los Angeles Galaxy	1–0 (a.e.t.)	New England Revolution	Gillette Stadium, Foxborough, MA
2003; Details	San Jose Earthquakes (2)	4–2	Chicago Fire	The Home Depot Center, Carson, CA
2004; Details	D.C. United (4)	3–2	Kansas City Wizards	The Home Depot Center, Carson, CA
2005; Details	Los Angeles Galaxy (2)	1–0 (a.e.t.)	New England Revolution	Pizza Hut Park, Frisco, TX
2006; Details	Houston Dynamo	1–1 (a.e.t.) (4–3 p)	New England Revolution	Pizza Hut Park, Frisco, TX
2007; Details	Houston Dynamo (2)	2–1	New England Revolution	Robert F. Kennedy Memorial Stadium, Washington, D.C.
2008; Details	Columbus Crew	3–1	New York Red Bulls	The Home Depot Center, Carson, CA
2009; Details	Real Salt Lake	1–1 (a.e.t.) (5–4 p)	Los Angeles Galaxy	Qwest Field, Seattle, WA
2010; Details	Colorado Rapids	2–1 (a.e.t.)	FC Dallas	BMO Field, Toronto, ON
2011; Details	Los Angeles Galaxy (3)	1–0	Houston Dynamo	The Home Depot Center, Carson, CA
2012; Details	Los Angeles Galaxy (4)	3–1	Houston Dynamo	The Home Depot Center, Carson, CA
2013; Details	Sporting Kansas City (2)	1–1 (a.e.t.) (7–6 p)	Real Salt Lake	Sporting Park, Kansas City, KS
2014; Details	Los Angeles Galaxy (5)	2–1 (a.e.t.)	New England Revolution	StubHub Center, Carson, CA
2015; Details	Portland Timbers	2–1	Columbus Crew	Mapfre Stadium, Columbus, OH
2016; Details	Seattle Sounders FC	0–0 (a.e.t.) (5–4 p)	Toronto FC	BMO Field, Toronto, ON
2017; Details	Toronto FC	2–0	Seattle Sounders FC	BMO Field, Toronto, ON
2018; Details	Atlanta United FC	2–0	Portland Timbers	Mercedes-Benz Stadium, Atlanta, GA
2019; Details	Seattle Sounders FC (2)	3–1	Toronto FC	CenturyLink Field, Seattle, WA
2020; Details	Columbus Crew (2)	3–0	Seattle Sounders FC	Mapfre Stadium, Columbus, OH
2021; Details	New York City FC	1–1 (a.e.t.) (4–2 p)	Portland Timbers	Providence Park, Portland, OR
2022; Details	Los Angeles FC	3–3 (a.e.t.) (3–0 p)	Philadelphia Union	Banc of California Stadium, Los Angeles, CA
2023; Details	Columbus Crew (3)	2–1	Los Angeles FC	Lower.com Field, Columbus, OH
2024; Details	Los Angeles Galaxy (6)	2–1	New York Red Bulls	Dignity Health Sports Park, Carson, CA
2025; Details	Inter Miami CF	3–1	Vancouver Whitecaps FC	Chase Stadium, Fort Lauderdale, FL

== Teams with most trophies ==
As of 2025 season

Team	Seasons	Domestic				Continental			Intercontinental	Total	Total per season
Team	Seasons	MLS Cup	SS	USOC (Note: Canadian teams cannot participate in the U.S. Open Cup.) (Note: Also includes the MLS is Back Tournament during the COVID-shortened 2020 season.)	CC (Note: American teams cannot participate in the Canadian Championship.)	CCL	Camp. Cup	LC/SL (Note: SuperLiga is a defunct competition; predecessor to Leagues Cup)	CI	Total	Total per season
D.C. United	30	4	4	3	N/A	1 (Note: Won under the previous CONCACAF Champions Cup format.)	–	–	1	13	0.43
Los Angeles Galaxy	30	6	4	2	N/A	1	–	–	–	13	0.43
Toronto FC	19	1	1	N/A	8	–	–	–	–	10	0.53
Seattle Sounders FC	17	2	1	4	N/A	1	-	1	–	9	0.53
Columbus Crew	30	3	3	1	N/A	-	1	1	–	9	0.30
Sporting Kansas City	30	2	1	4	N/A	–	–	–	–	7	0.24
Chicago Fire FC	28	1	1	4	N/A	–	–	–	–	6	0.22
Houston Dynamo FC	20	2	–	2	N/A	–	–	–	–	4	0.21
CF Montréal	14	–	–	N/A	4 (Note: The 2008 Canadian Championship was won by the NASL's Montreal Impact, not the Montreal Impact (now CF Montréal) that competed in MLS prior to their renaming.)	-	–	–	–	4	0.31
San Jose Earthquakes	28	2	2	–	N/A	–	–	–	–	4	0.15
Los Angeles FC	8	1	2	1	N/A	–	–	–	–	4	0.50
Atlanta United FC	9	1	–	1	N/A	–	1	–	–	3	0.38
FC Dallas	30	–	1	2	N/A	–	–	–	–	3	0.10
New York Red Bulls	30	–	3	–	N/A	–	–	–	–	3	0.10
New England Revolution	30	–	1	1	N/A	–	–	1	–	3	0.10
Vancouver Whitecaps FC	15	–	–	N/A	4	–	–	–	–	4	0.26
Portland Timbers	15	1	–	1	–	–	–	–	–	2	0.14
New York City FC	11	1	–	–	N/A	–	1	–	–	2	0.20
Inter Miami CF	6	1	1	–	N/A	–	1	1	–	4	0.67
FC Cincinnati	7	–	1	–	N/A	–	–	–	–	1	0.17
Colorado Rapids	30	1	–	–	N/A	–	–	–	–	1	0.03
Miami Fusion (Note: Team is defunct and no longer exists.)	4	–	1	–	N/A	–	–	–	–	1	0.25
Orlando City SC	11	–	–	1	N/A	–	–	–	–	1	0.10
Philadelphia Union	16	–	2	–	N/A	–	–	–	–	2	0.12
Real Salt Lake	21	1	–	–	N/A	–	–	–	–	1	0.05
Nashville SC	6	–	–	1	N/A	−	−	–	–	1	0.17
Tampa Bay Mutiny	6	–	1	–	N/A	–	–	–	–	1	0.17
Austin FC	5	–	–	–	N/A	–	–	–	–	–	–
Charlotte FC	4	–	–	–	N/A	–	–	–	–	–	–
Chivas USA	10	–	–	–	N/A	–	–	–	–	–	–
Minnesota United FC	9	–	–	–	N/A	–	–	–	–	–	–
St. Louis City SC	3	–	–	–	N/A	–	–	–	–	–	–

== Player records (career) ==
Bold indicates an active player. All statistics are for regular season only.

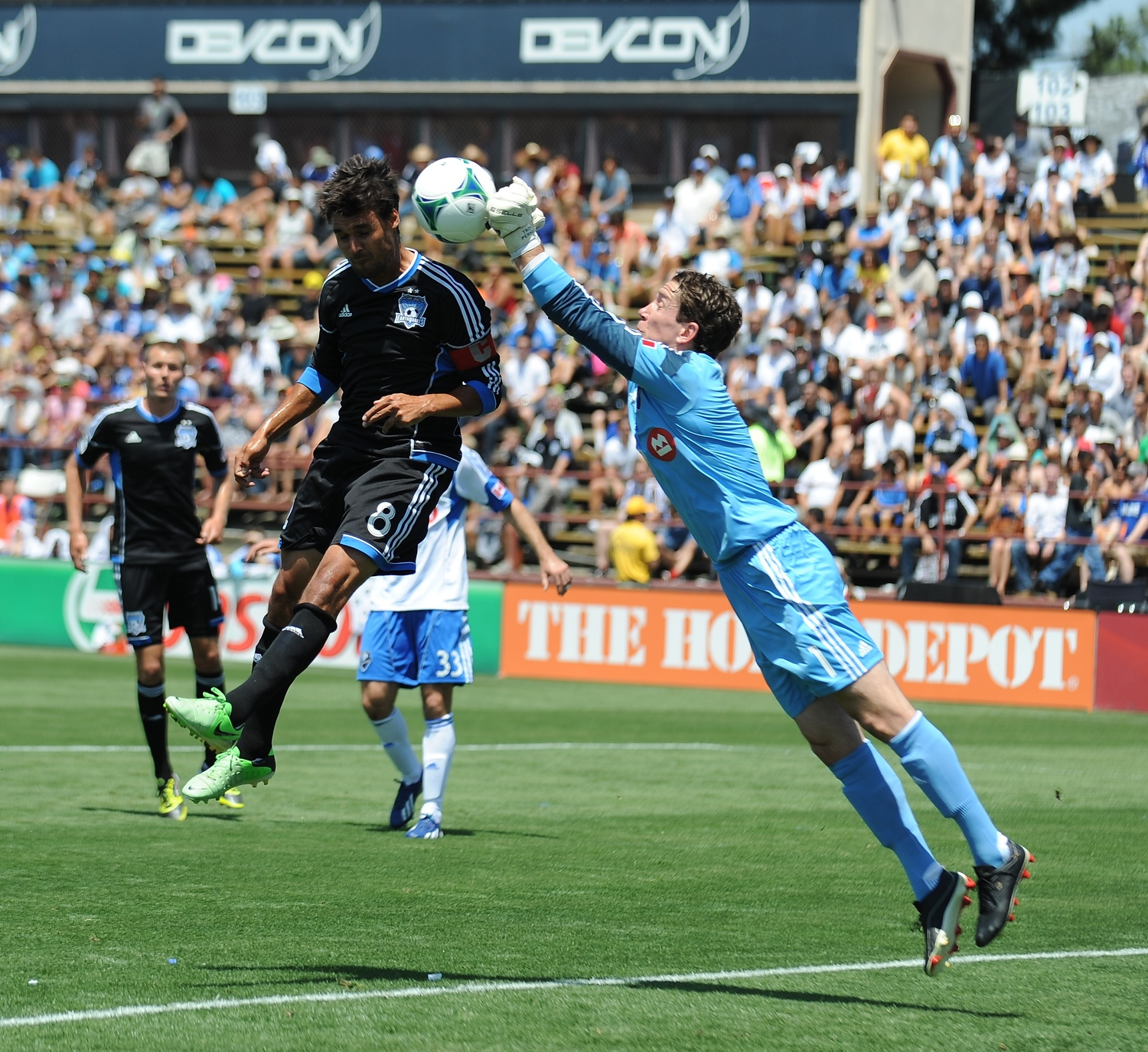
Chris Wondolowski in 2013

=== Goals ===
As of November 7, 2026

Rank	Player	Years	Goals	Apps	Ratio
1	(United States) Chris Wondolowski	2005–2021	171	413	0.41
2	(Sierra Leone) Kei Kamara	2006–2013; 2015–2020; 2022–2025	147	464	0.32
3	(United States) Landon Donovan	2001–2014; 2016	145	340	0.43
4	(United States) Jeff Cunningham	1998–2011	134	365	0.37
5	(Bolivia) Jaime Moreno	1996–2010	133	340	0.39
6	(Venezuela) **Josef Martínez**	2017–2025; 2026–present	131	226	0.58
7	(England) Bradley Wright-Phillips	2013–2021	117	234	0.5
8	(United States) Ante Razov	1996–2000; 2001–2009	114	262	0.44
9	(United States) Jason Kreis	1996–2007	108	305	0.35
10	(United States) Gyasi Zardes	2013–2024	106	328	0.32

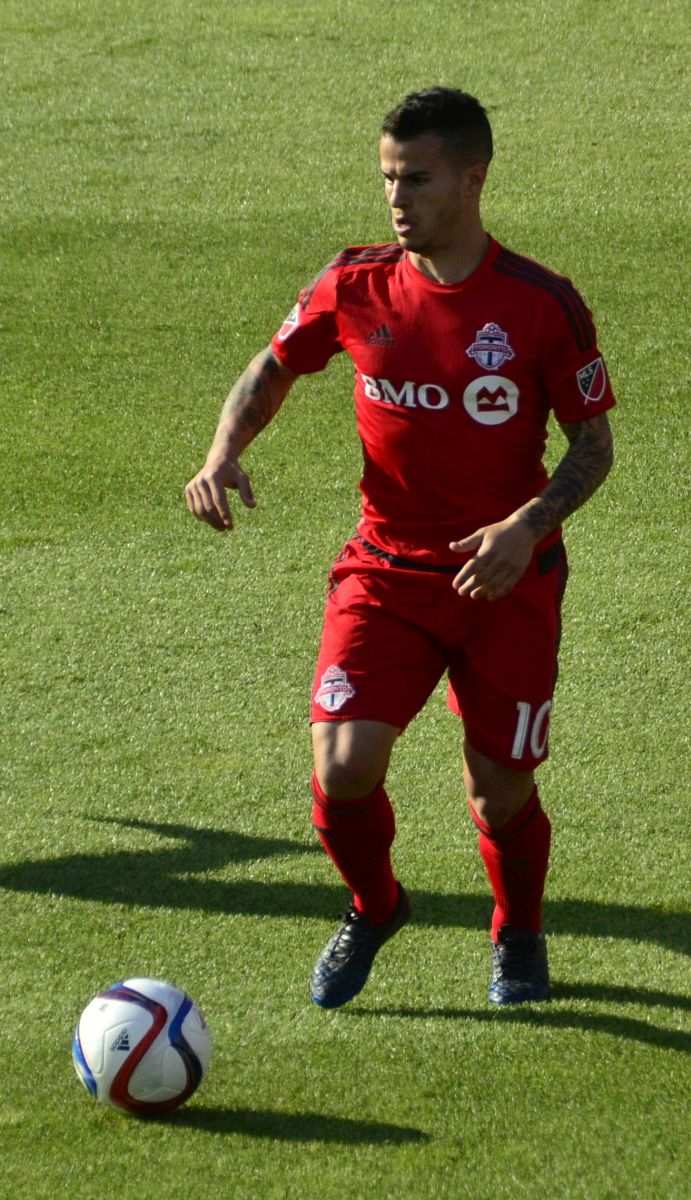
Sebastian Giovinco in 2015

=== Goals from free kicks ===
Rank	Player	Years	Goals
1	(Italy) Sebastian Giovinco	2015–2018	13
2	(United States) Jeff Larentowicz	2005–2020	9
2	(Argentina) Javier Morales	2007–2017	9
2	(Argentina) **Lionel Messi**	2023–present	9
5	(England) David Beckham	2007–2012	7
5	(Armenia) Lucas Zelarayán	2020–2023	7

=== Assists ===
As of the end of the 2025 regular season.

Rank	Player	Years	Assists	Apps	Ratio
1	(United States) Landon Donovan	2001–2014; 2016	136	340	0.4
2	(United States) Steve Ralston	1996–2010	135	378	0.36
3	(United States) Brad Davis	2002–2016	123	392	0.31
4	(Colombia) Carlos Valderrama	1996–2002	114	175	0.65
5	(United States) Preki	1996–2005	112	242	0.46
6	(Bolivia) Jaime Moreno	1996–2010	102	340	0.3
7	(Bolivia) Marco Etcheverry	1996–2003	101	191	0.53
8	(United States) Sacha Kljestan	2006–2010; 2015–2022	99	331	0.3
9	(Argentina) Luciano Acosta	2016–2025	98	272	0.36
10	(Uruguay) Nicolás Lodeiro	2016–2025	92	241	0.37

=== Minutes played ===
As of the end of the 2025 regular season.

Minutes played
Rank	Player	Minutes
1	(United States) Nick Rimando	46,336
2	(United States) Kyle Beckerman	41,164
3	(United States) **Sean Johnson**	38,766
4	(Switzerland) **Stefan Frei**	38,711
5	(United States) Dax McCarty	37,610
6	(United States) Kevin Hartman	37,260
7	(Liberia) Darlington Nagbe	37,235
8	(United States) Chad Marshall	35,843
9	(Colombia) **Diego Chará**	35,820
10	(United States) Jeff Larentowicz	35,589

=== Average goals conceded ===
As of the end of the 2025 regular season; minimum 4,500 minutes played.

Rank	Player	Average	Years
1	(Denmark) Jimmy Nielsen	0.99	2010–2013
2	(United States) Kasey Keller	1.06	2009–2011
3	(Panama) Jaime Penedo	1.09	2013–2015
4	(Senegal) Bouna Coundoul	1.13	2005–2011
5	(Canada) Pat Onstad	1.14	2003–2011
6	(France) **Hugo Lloris**	1.15	2024–present
7	(Curaçao) Eloy Room	1.17	2019–2023
8	(Jamaica) **Andre Blake**	1.19	2014–present
9	(Jamaica) Donovan Ricketts	1.20	2009–2015
10	(United States) Kevin Hartman	1.21	1997–2013

== Player records (single season) ==
All statistics are for regular season only.

=== Most goals ===
Rank	Player	Season	Team	Goals
1	(Mexico) Carlos Vela	2019	Los Angeles FC	34
2	(Venezuela) Josef Martínez	2018	Atlanta United FC	31
3	(Sweden) Zlatan Ibrahimović	2019	Los Angeles Galaxy	30
4	(Argentina) Lionel Messi	2025	Inter Miami CF	29
5	(United States) Roy Lassiter	1996	Tampa Bay Mutiny	27
5	(United States) Chris Wondolowski	2012	San Jose Earthquakes	27
5	(England) Bradley Wright-Phillips	2014	New York Red Bulls	27
5	(Venezuela) Josef Martínez	2019	Atlanta United FC	27
9	(Trinidad and Tobago) Stern John	1998	Columbus Crew	26
9	(Senegal) Mamadou Diallo	2000	Tampa Bay Mutiny	26
9	(Argentina) Lionel Messi	2026	Inter Miami CF	26

=== Most assists ===
Rank	Player	Season	Team	Assists
1	(Colombia) Carlos Valderrama	2000	Tampa Bay Mutiny	26
2	(United States) Sacha Kljestan	2016	New York Red Bulls	20
2	(Argentina) Maxi Moralez	2019	New York City FC	20
4	(Bolivia) Marco Etcheverry	1996	D.C. United	19
4	(Colombia) Carlos Valderrama	1997	Tampa Bay Mutiny	19
4	(Bolivia) Marco Etcheverry	1998	D.C. United	19
4	(United States) Steve Ralston	2002	New England Revolution	19
4	(Argentina) Guillermo Barros Schelotto	2008	Columbus Crew	19
4	(United States) Landon Donovan	2014	Los Angeles Galaxy	19
4	(Argentina) Luciano Acosta	2022	FC Cincinnati	19
4	(Argentina) Thiago Almada	2023	Atlanta United FC	19
4	(Argentina) Luciano Acosta	2024	FC Cincinnati	19
4	(Brazil) Evander	2024	Portland Timbers	19
4	(Denmark) Anders Dreyer	2025	San Diego FC	19
4	(Argentina) Lionel Messi	2025	Inter Miami CF	19

=== Most clean sheets ===
As of 2026 season

Rank	Player	Season	Team	Clean sheets
1	(United States) Tony Meola	2000	Kansas City Wizards	16
1	(United States) Brian Schwake	2026	Nashville SC	16
3	(Denmark) Jimmy Nielsen	2012	Sporting Kansas City	15
3	(Jamaica) Andre Blake	2022	Philadelphia Union	15
5	(United States) Nick Rimando	2010	Real Salt Lake	14
5	(Jamaica) Donovan Ricketts	2013	Portland Timbers	14
5	(United States) Luis Robles	2018	New York Red Bulls	14
5	(United States) Brad Guzan	2019	Atlanta United FC	14
5	(United States) Bill Hamid	2019	D.C. United	14
5	(United States) Sean Johnson	2022	New York City FC	14
5	(Switzerland) Stefan Frei	2023	Seattle Sounders FC	14
5	(Japan) Yohei Takaoka	2026	Vancouver Whitecaps FC	14

== Player records (single game) ==
=== Most goals (single game) ===
As of 2026 season

Rank	Player	Goals	For	Against	Result	Date	Ref.
1	(United States) Clint Mathis	5	MetroStars	Dallas Burn	4–6	August 25, 2000	
2	(Argentina) Lionel Messi	4	Inter Miami CF	CF Montréal	7–1	August 29, 2026	
2	(United States) Milan Iloski	4	San Diego FC	Vancouver Whitecaps FC	5–3	June 25, 2025	
2	(England) Sam Surridge	4	Nashville SC	Chicago Fire FC	7–2	April 26, 2025	
2	(United States) Brian White	4	Vancouver Whitecaps FC	LA Galaxy	5–1	April 12, 2025	
2	(Finland) Teemu Pukki	4	Minnesota United FC	LA Galaxy	5–2	October 8, 2023	
2	(United States) Jordan Morris	4	Seattle Sounders FC	Sporting Kansas City	1–4	March 26, 2023	
2	(Mexico) Daniel Ríos	4	Charlotte FC	Philadelphia Union	4–0	October 1, 2022	
2	(Argentina) Taty Castellanos	4	New York City FC	Real Salt Lake	6–0	April 17, 2022	
2	(Uruguay) Diego Rossi	4	Los Angeles FC	LA Galaxy	6–2	July 19, 2020	
2	(United States) Chris Wondolowski	4	San Jose Earthquakes	Chicago Fire	4–1	May 18, 2019	
2	(United States) Patrick Mullins	4	D.C. United	San Jose Earthquakes	4–0	September 24, 2017	
2	(United States) Jeff Cunningham	4	FC Dallas	Kansas City Wizards	6–0	August 2, 2009	
2	(United States) Brian Ching	4	Houston Dynamo	Colorado Rapids	5–2	April 3, 2006	
2	(United States) Edson Buddle	4	Columbus Crew	MetroStars	4–2	September 19, 2004	
2	(Senegal) Mamadou Diallo (2)	4	Metro Stars	Los Angeles Galaxy	5–0	June 14, 2002	
2	(Senegal) Mamadou Diallo (2)	4	Tampa Bay Mutiny	Los Angeles Galaxy	4–4	May 8, 2001	
2	(Sierra Leone) Abdul Thompson Conteh	4	D.C. United	New England Revolution	5–0	May 8, 2001	
2	(Colombia) Diego Serna	4	Miami Fusion	MetroStars	4–1	September 1, 2000	
2	(Trinidad and Tobago) Stern John	4	Columbus Crew	MetroStars	2–4	August 17, 1999	
2	(El Salvador) Raúl Díaz Arce (2)	4	D.C. United	Colorado Rapids	2–5	April 11, 1997	
2	(El Salvador) Raúl Díaz Arce (2)	4	D.C. United	Dallas Burn	6–1	July 6, 1996	

=== Most assists (single game) ===
Rank	Player	Assists	For	Against	Result	Date	Ref.
1	(Argentina) Lionel Messi	5	Inter Miami CF	New York Red Bulls	6–2	May 4, 2024	
2	(South Korea) Son Heung-min	4	Los Angeles FC	Orlando City SC	6–0	April 4, 2026	
2	(Belgium) Dante Vanzeir	4	New York Red Bulls	CF Montréal	4–0	March 23, 2024	
2	(Brazil) Léo Chú	4	Seattle Sounders FC	Sporting Kansas City	4–1	March 26, 2023	
2	(Colombia) Yimmi Chará	4	Portland Timbers	LA Galaxy	5–2	October 28, 2020	
2	(United States) Lee Nguyen	4	New England Revolution	Orlando City SC	4–0	September 2, 2017	
2	(United States) Landon Donovan	4	Los Angeles Galaxy	Chivas USA	4–0	August 12, 2012	
2	(Canada) Dwayne De Rosario	4	Houston Dynamo	Colorado Rapids	5–2	February 4, 2006	
2	(United States) Chris Henderson	4	Kansas City Wizards	MetroStars	6–0	June 20, 1999	
2	(Colombia) Carlos Valderrama	4	Tampa Bay Mutiny	New England Revolution	4–0	August 30, 1997	

== All-time regular season success ==
As of end of 2025 regular season

Rank	Club	Seasons (Years)	Total	1st	2nd	3rd	4th
1	Los Angeles Galaxy	30 (1996–)	12	4	3	3	2
2	D.C. United	30 (1996–)	10	4	1	4	1
3	Sporting Kansas City	30 (1996–)	9	1	4	2	2
3	Chicago Fire FC	28 (1998–)	9	1	2	2	4
5	Columbus Crew	30 (1996–)	8	3	1	1	3
5	FC Dallas	30 (1996–)	8	1	2	2	3
7	New York Red Bulls	30 (1996–)	7	3	0	3	1
8	Seattle Sounders FC	17 (2009–)	6	2	2	1	1
9	San Jose Earthquakes	28 (1996–2005, 2008–)	5	2	2	0	1
9	New England Revolution	30 (1996–)	5	1	1	2	1
11	New York City FC	11 (2015–)	4	1	2	0	1
11	Real Salt Lake	21 (2005–)	4	0	1	1	2
13	Philadelphia Union	16 (2010–)	3	2	1	0	0
13	Los Angeles FC	8 (2018–)	3	2	0	1	0
13	Tampa Bay Mutiny	6 (1996–2001)	3	1	0	1	1
13	Houston Dynamo FC	20 (2006–)	3	0	2	1	0
13	Colorado Rapids	30 (1996–)	3	0	2	0	1
13	Atlanta United FC	9 (2017–)	3	0	1	1	1
19	Toronto FC	19 (2007–)	2	1	1	0	0
19	FC Cincinnati	7 (2019–)	2	1	1	0	0
19	Inter Miami CF	6 (2020–)	2	1	0	1	0
19	Chivas USA	10 (2005–2014)	2	0	1	0	1
23	Miami Fusion	4 (1998–2001)	1	1	0	0	0
23	Orlando City SC	11 (2015–)	1	0	1	0	0
23	Vancouver Whitecaps FC	15 (2011–)	1	0	0	1	0
23	Portland Timbers	15 (2011–)	1	0	0	1	0
23	CF Montréal	14 (2012–)	1	0	0	1	0
23	Austin FC	5 (2021–)	1	0	0	0	1
23	St. Louis City SC	3 (2023–)	1	0	0	0	1
23	San Diego FC	1 (2025–)	1	0	0	0	1
31	Minnesota United FC	9 (2017–)	0	0	0	0	0
31	Nashville SC	6 (2020–)	0	0	0	0	0
31	Charlotte FC	4 (2022–)	0	0	0	0	0

- Supporters' Shield Standings through 2022 season.
- Miami Fusion and Tampa Bay Mutiny folded after completion of the 2001 season.
- Chivas USA folded after completion of the 2014 season.

== All-time regular season table ==
Through completion of 2023 regular season.

Club	Seasons (Yrs)	Pld	W^{2}	L^{3}	T	SOW	GF	GA	GD	Pts	PPG	PPS	1st	2nd	3rd	4th
Club	Seasons (Yrs)	Pld	W^{2}	L^{3}	T	SOW	GF	GA	GD	Pts	PPG	PPS	Finishing Positions^{4}			
St Louis City SC	1 (2023–)	34	17	12	5	0	62	45	+17	56	1.647	56.00	0	0	0	1
Los Angeles FC	6 (2018–)	192	93	53	46	0	373	256	+117	325	1.693	54.17	2	0	0	0
Seattle Sounders FC	15 (2009–)	490	225	150	115	0	720	564	+156	790	1.612	52.67	2	2	1	1
New York City FC	9 (2015–)	295	126	93	76	0	474	386	+88	454	1.539	50.44	0	2	0	1
Atlanta United FC	7 (2017–)	227	96	73	58	0	380	301	+79	346	1.524	49.43	0	1	2	0
Portland Timbers	13 (2011–)	431	166	145	120	0	645	626	+19	618	1.434	47.54	0	0	1	0
Los Angeles Galaxy	28 (1996–)	888	385	311	192	11	1427	1253	+174	1325	1.492	47.32	4	3	3	1
Philadelphia Union	14 (2010–)	461	176	161	124	0	681	604	+77	652	1.414	46.57	1	1	0	0
Nashville SC	4 (2020–)	125	46	32	47	0	170	128	+42	185	1.480	46.25	0	0	0	0
New York Red Bulls	28 (1996–)	889	364	340	185	11	1328	1265	+63	1255	1.412	44.82	3	0	3	1
Columbus Crew	28 (1996–)	889	361	332	196	13	1307	1240	+67	1253	1.409	44.75	3	0	1	3
FC Dallas	28 (1996–)	888	359	327	202	15	1313	1259	+54	1249	1.407	44.61	1	2	2	3
Sporting Kansas City	28 (1996–)	887	362	332	193	16	1278	1212	+66	1247	1.406	44.54	1	4	2	2
Real Salt Lake	19 (2005–)	614	231	231	152	0	838	836	+2	845	1.376	44.47	0	1	1	2
Orlando City SC	9 (2015–)	295	104	111	80	0	416	465	−49	392	1.329	43.56	0	1	0	0
CF Montréal	12 (2012–)	397	147	172	78	0	554	615	−61	519	1.307	43.25	0	0	1	0
Vancouver Whitecaps FC	13 (2011–)	431	149	168	114	0	563	638	−75	561	1.302	43.15	0	0	1	0
Chicago Fire FC	26 (1998–)	826	305	315	206	5	1186	1177	+9	1111	1.345	42.73	1	2	2	4
Charlotte FC	2 (2022–)	68	23	29	16	0	89	104	−15	85	1.250	42.50	0	0	0	0
Houston Dynamo FC	18 (2006–)	583	199	217	167	0	789	798	-9	764	1.310	42.44	0	2	1	0
Minnesota United FC	7 (2017–)	225	82	92	51	0	320	356	−36	297	1.320	42.43	0	0	0	0
D.C. United	28 (1996–)	888	347	362	179	18	1327	1341	-14	1184	1.333	42.29	4	1	4	1
New England Revolution	28 (1996–)	890	339	353	198	17	1286	1352	−66	1181	1.327	42.18	1	1	2	1
Austin FC	3 (2021–)	102	35	46	21	0	149	160	−11	126	1.235	42.00	0	0	0	1
San Jose Earthquakes	26 (1996–2005, 2008–)	827	296	330	201	19	1155	1236	−81	1051	1.271	40.42	2	2	0	1
Colorado Rapids	28 (1996–)	884	318	373	193	12	1160	1321	−161	1123	1.270	40.11	0	2	0	1
Miami Fusion	4 (1998–2001)	122	56	56	10	10	209	223	−14	158	1.295	39.50	1	0	0	0
Tampa Bay Mutiny	6 (1996–2001)	187	83	98	6	10	322	353	−31	235	1.257	39.17	1	0	1	1
Toronto FC	17 (2007–)	551	166	238	147	0	721	868	−147	645	1.171	37.94	1	1	0	0
Inter Miami CF	4 (2020–)	125	42	62	21	0	149	198	−49	147	1.176	36.75	0	0	0	0
FC Cincinnati	5 (2019–)	159	46	73	40	0	201	280	−79	178	1.119	35.60	1	0	0	0
Chivas USA	10 (2005–2014)	320	92	149	79	0	351	483	−132	355	1.109	35.50	0	1	0	1

^{1} – Ranking based number of points per season.
^{2} – Includes shoot-out wins from 1996–1999 season.
^{3} – Includes shoot-out losses from 1996–1999 seasons.
^{4} – Based on combined conference results before single format for playoff qualification was inaugurated in 2007.

== All-time playoffs success ==
Through 2023 playoffs.

Club	Champions	Final	Conf Finals	Conf Semis	First Rnd	Series Played	Series Won	Series Lost	Series Won %
Los Angeles Galaxy	6	4	4	6	1	46	31	15	67.39%
D.C. United	4	1	2	5	3	27	17	10	62.96%
Columbus Crew	3	1	5	7	1	29	17	12	58.62%
Seattle Sounders FC	2	4	2	7	0	25	16	9	64.00%
Houston Dynamo FC	2	2	4	1	0	22	16	6	72.73%
Sporting Kansas City	2	1	5	7	3	30	15	15	50.00%
San Jose Earthquakes	2	0	1	5	3	15	7	8	46.67%
Chicago Fire FC	1	2	5	4	1	23	12	11	52.17%
Portland Timbers	1	2	1	1	2	8	5	3	62.50%
Toronto FC	1	2	0	0	2	13	9	4	69.23%
Colorado Rapids	1	1	4	5	1	23	10	13	43.48%
Real Salt Lake	1	1	2	5	3	18	8	10	44.44%
Los Angeles FC	1	1	1	0	2	11	7	4	63.64%
New York City FC	1	0	1	4	1	12	6	6	50.00%
Atlanta United FC	1	0	1	0	2	8	5	3	62.50%
New England Revolution	0	5	3	5	3	30	14	16	46.67%
New York Red Bulls	0	1	4	14	4	29	8	21	27.59%
FC Dallas	0	1	3	12	4	27	8	19	29.63%
Philadelphia Union	0	1	1	3	3	10	4	6	40.00%
Tampa Bay Mutiny	0	0	1	4	0	5	1	4	20.00%
Miami Fusion	0	0	1	2	0	4	1	3	25.00%
CF Montréal	0	0	1	1	0	6	3	3	50.00%
FC Cincinnati	0	0	1	1	0	5	3	2	60.00%
Minnesota United FC	0	0	1	0	2	5	2	3	40.00%
Austin FC	0	0	1	0	0	3	2	1	66.67%
Chivas USA	0	0	0	4	0	4	0	4	00.00%
Vancouver Whitecaps FC	0	0	0	2	5	7	1	6	14.29%
Orlando City SC	0	0	0	2	1	5	2	3	40.00%
Nashville SC	0	0	0	1	2	4	1	3	25.00%
Charlotte FC	0	0	0	0	1	1	0	1	00.00%
Inter Miami CF	1	0	0	0	1	1	0	1	00.00%
St. Louis City SC	0	0	0	0	1	1	0	1	00.00%

- Shows number of best finishes at each playoff level through completion of 2022 playoffs. Does not include the 2020 "Play-In Round."

== All-time playoffs table ==
Through 2023 playoffs.

Rank^{1}	Club	Appearances vs Seasons	Appearances Percentage	Pld	W^{2}	L^{3}	T	SOW	GF	GA	GD	Pts	PPG
1	Los Angeles Galaxy	20 / 28	71.43%	77	46	25	6	1	130	88	+42	141	1.831
2	Columbus Crew	17 / 28	60.71%	60	30	25	5	1	91	89	+2	95	1.583
3	D.C. United	15 / 28	53.57%	48	27	17	4	4	72	65	+7	85	1.771
4	Seattle Sounders FC	14 / 15	93.33%	46	25	16	5	0	62	48	+14	80	1.739
5	Sporting Kansas City	20 / 28	71.43%	56	22	26	8	2	78	80	−2	74	1.250
6	New York Red Bulls	24 / 28	85.71%	60	21	31	8	1	72	83	-11	71	1.183
7	Chicago Fire FC	14 / 26	53.85%	44	21	18	5	1	61	45	+16	66	1.500
8	Houston Dynamo FC	9 / 18	50.00%	38	19	12	7	1	47	38	+9	64	1.684
9	New England Revolution	17 / 28	60.71%	49	19	23	7	0	58	62	-4	64	1.306
10	FC Dallas	20 / 28	71.43%	52	15	28	9	2	67	90	−23	54	1.038
11	Real Salt Lake	13 / 19	68.42%	34	12	15	7	2	38	46	-8	43	1.265
12	Colorado Rapids	15 / 28	53.57%	41	13	24	4	0	34	60	−26	43	1.049
13	Portland Timbers	7 / 13	53.85%	24	12	7	5	0	37	30	+7	41	1.708
14	San Jose Earthquakes	11 / 26	42.31%	27	12	13	2	0	40	40	0	38	1.407
15	Toronto FC	5 / 17	29.41%	17	10	6	1	0	32	18	+14	31	1.824
16	Los Angeles FC	5 / 6	83.33%	12	7	4	1	1	28	21	+7	22	1.833
17	CF Montréal	4 / 12	33.33%	11	7	4	0	0	21	20	+1	21	1.909
18	Atlanta United FC	5 / 7	71.43%	13	7	6	0	0	19	14	+5	21	1.615
19	New York City FC	7 / 9	77.78%	16	6	7	3	2	23	9	+14	21	1.313
20	Philadelphia Union	8 / 14	57.14%	16	6	9	1	1	21	25	−4	19	1.188
21	FC Cincinnati	2 / 5	40.00%	6	3	2	1	1	9	6	+3	10	1.667
22	Miami Fusion	3 / 4	75.00%	10	3	7	0	0	6	13	−7	9	0.900
23	Orlando City SC	4 / 9	44.44%	7	2	4	1	0	5	10	-5	7	1.000
24	Minnesota United FC	4 / 7	57.14%	6	2	4	0	0	1	9	+2	6	1.000
25	Nashville SC	4 / 4	100.00%	7	2	5	0	0	5	7	-2	6	0.857
26	Chivas USA	4 / 10	40.00%	8	1	4	3	0	6	10	−4	6	0.750
27	Tampa Bay Mutiny	4 / 6	66.67%	11	2	9	0	0	12	23	−11	6	0.545
28	Vancouver Whitecaps FC	6 / 12	50.00%	10	1	7	2	0	10	17	−7	5	0.500
29	Austin FC	1 / 2	50.00%	3	1	1	1	1	4	6	−2	4	1.333
30	Inter Miami CF	1 / 4	25.00%	1	0	1	0	0	0	3	-3	0	0.000
31	St. Louis City SC	1 / 1	100.00%	2	0	2	0	0	2	6	-4	0	0.000
31	Charlotte FC	1 / 1	100.00%	1	0	1	0	0	2	5	-3	0	0.000

^{1} – Ranking based on overall number of points.
^{2} – Includes shoot-out wins from 1996–1999 seasons. Post-1999 shoot-out wins counted as ties.
^{3} – Includes shoot-out losses from 1996–1999 seasons. Post-1999 shoot-out losses counted as ties.

== Team records (single season) ==
Legend
Indicates ongoing season

=== Points ===
- All stats are from regular season games only.
- From 1996 to 1999, a shoot-out was used to determine the winner of a match if it was a tie after 90 minutes.
- From 2000 to 2003, a 10-minute golden goal period was used to determine the winner of a match if it was a tie after 90 minutes.
- In 2020, teams played a shortened season and unequal number of between 18 and 23 games.

As of 2026 season

Most points
Rank	Team	Points	Season
1	Nashville SC	77	2026
2	Inter Miami CF	74	2024
3	New England Revolution	73	2021
4	Los Angeles FC	72	2019
5	New York Red Bulls	71	2018
6	Toronto FC	69	2017
6	Atlanta United FC	69^{3}	2018
6	FC Cincinnati	69	2023
9	Los Angeles Galaxy	68^{1}	1998
10	Los Angeles Galaxy	67	2011
10	Los Angeles FC	67	2022
10	Philadelphia Union	67^{3}	2022

Fewest points
Rank	Team	Points	Season
1	Tampa Bay Mutiny	14	2001
2	MetroStars	15^{1}	1999
3	D.C. United	16	2013
3	FC Cincinnati	16^{2}	2020
5	Chivas USA	18	2005
6	Kansas City Wizards	20^{1}	1999
6	Real Salt Lake	20	2005
6	FC Cincinnati	20	2021
9	New York Red Bulls	21	2009
9	San Jose Earthquakes	21	2018
9	D.C. United	21^{2}	2020
9	Houston Dynamo	21^{2}	2020
9	San Jose Earthquakes	21	2024

^{1} – Points earned during shoot-out era

^{2} – Points earned during shortened 2020 season

^{3} – Did not win Supporters' Shield

=== Results ===
Wins

Rank	Team	W^{1}	Season
1	D.C. United	24	1998
1	Los Angeles Galaxy	24	1998
3	D.C. United	23	1999
3	Nashville SC	23	2026
5	New York Red Bulls	22	2018
5	New England Revolution	22	2021
5	Inter Miami CF	22	2024
8	D.C. United	21	1997
8	Kansas City Wizards	21	1997
8	Atlanta United FC	21	2018
8	Los Angeles FC	21	2019
8	Los Angeles FC	21	2022

^{1} – Includes shoot-out wins in seasons played from 1996–1999.

Losses

Rank	Team	L^{1}	Season
1	MetroStars	25	1999
1	San Jose Earthquakes	25	2024
3	Kansas City Wizards	24	1999
3	D.C. United	24	2013
5	Chivas USA	22	2005
5	Real Salt Lake	22	2005
5	Orlando City SC	22	2018
5	FC Cincinnati	22	2019
5	FC Cincinnati	22	2021
5	Sporting Kansas City	22	2026

^{1} – Includes shoot-out losses in seasons played from 1996–1999.

Ties

Rank	Team	T^{1}	Season
1	Chicago Fire	18	2014
1	Nashville SC	18	2021
3	Chicago Fire	16	2011
3	New York Red Bulls	16	2011
3	Los Angeles Galaxy	16	2016
3	Columbus Crew	16	2022
7	Philadelphia Union	15	2011
7	Toronto FC	15	2011
7	Portland Timbers	15	2013
10	Vancouver Whitecaps FC	14	2014
10	Orlando City SC	14	2016
10	San Jose Earthquakes	14	2016
10	New York City FC	14	2023
10	San Jose Earthquakes	14	2023
10	New York Red Bulls	14	2024
10	Toronto FC	14	2025

^{1} – No ties in seasons played from 1996–1999.

=== Goals ===
As of 2026 season

==== Most for ====
Rank	Team	Goals	Season
1	Los Angeles Galaxy	85	1998
1	Los Angeles FC	85	2019
3	Inter Miami CF	81	2025
4	Inter Miami CF	80	2026
5	Inter Miami CF	79	2024
6	D.C. United	74	1998
6	Toronto FC	74	2017
6	Vancouver Whitecaps FC	74	2026
9	San Jose Earthquakes	72	2012
9	Philadelphia Union	72	2022
9	Columbus Crew	72	2024

==== Fewest for ====
Rank	Team	Goals	Season
1	FC Cincinnati	12^{1}	2020
2	D.C. United	21	2010
3	D.C. United	22	2013
4	Atlanta United FC	23^{1}	2020
5	Chivas USA	24	2012
5	Nashville SC	24^{1}	2020
7	Toronto FC	25	2007
7	D.C. United	25^{1}	2020
7	Inter Miami CF	25^{1}	2020
7	Real Salt Lake	25^{1}	2020

^{1} – Goals scored during shortened 2020 season.

==== Fewest allowed ====
Rank	Team	GA	Season
1	Real Salt Lake	20	2010
1	Philadelphia Union	20^{1}	2020
3	Columbus Crew	21^{1}	2020
4	Nashville SC	22^{1}	2020
5	Houston Dynamo	23	2007
5	Seattle Sounders FC	23^{1}	2020
7	FC Dallas	24^{1}	2020
8	New England Revolution	25^{1}	2020
8	New York City FC	25^{1}	2020
8	Orlando City SC	25^{1}	2020
8	Sporting Kansas City	25^{1}	2020
8	Nashville SC	25	2026

==== Most allowed ====
Rank	Team	GA	Season
1	Sporting Kansas City	81	2026
2	San Jose Earthquakes	78	2024
2	Orlando City SC	78	2026
4	FC Cincinnati	75	2019
4	FC Cincinnati	75	2026
6	Orlando City SC	74	2018
6	FC Cincinnati	74	2021
6	New England Revolution	74	2024
9	Minnesota United FC	71	2018
9	San Jose Earthquakes	71	2018
9	D.C. United	71	2022

^{1} – Goals scored during shortened 2020 season.

==== Best differential ====
Rank	Team	GD	Season
1	Los Angeles FC	48	2019
2	Philadelphia Union	46	2022
2	Nashville SC	46	2026
4	Los Angeles Galaxy	41	1998
5	Vancouver Whitecaps FC	40	2026
6	Toronto FC	37	2017
7	Los Angeles Galaxy	32	2014
7	Columbus Crew	32	2024
9	Atlanta United FC	30	2017
9	Inter Miami CF	30	2024

==== Worst differential ====
Rank	Team	GD	Season
1	FC Cincinnati	−44	2019
2	Sporting Kansas City	−41	2026
3	Chivas USA	−37	2013
3	D.C. United	−37	2013
3	FC Cincinnati	−37	2021
3	New England Revolution	−37	2024
3	San Jose Earthquakes	−37	2024
8	Tampa Bay Mutiny	−36	2001
8	Chivas USA	−36	2005
8	D.C. United	−36	2025

== Single game records ==
=== Highest scoring games ===
Goals	Date	Home team	Result	Away team
11	May 6, 1998	Los Angeles Galaxy	7–4	Colorado Rapids
10	May 2, 1996	Kansas City Wiz	6–4	Columbus Crew
10	August 26, 2000	Dallas Burn	4–6	MetroStars
10	May 8, 2004	San Jose Earthquakes	5–5	MetroStars
10	August 1, 2015	D.C. United	6–4	Real Salt Lake
10	May 24, 2026	Inter Miami CF	6–4	Philadelphia Union

=== Most goals scored by a team ===
As of August 29, 2026

Goals	Date	Team	Opponent	Opponent Goals	Margin
8	June 4, 1998	Los Angeles Galaxy	Dallas Burn	1	7
7	May 6, 1998	Los Angeles Galaxy	Colorado Rapids	4	3
7	July 4, 2001	Chicago Fire	Kansas City Wizards	0	7
7	May 21, 2016	New York Red Bulls	New York City FC	0	7
7	September 13, 2017	Atlanta United FC	New England Revolution	0	7
7	March 30, 2019	Sporting Kansas City	Montreal Impact	1	6
7	June 29, 2019	Minnesota United FC	FC Cincinnati	1	6
7	September 15, 2019	Los Angeles Galaxy	Sporting Kansas City	2	5
7	September 10, 2020	Seattle Sounders FC	San Jose Earthquakes	1	6
7	July 3, 2021	D.C. United	Toronto FC	1	6
7	May 14, 2022	Portland Timbers	Sporting Kansas City	2	5
7	July 8, 2022	Philadelphia Union	D.C. United	0	7
7	April 26, 2025	Nashville SC	Chicago Fire FC	2	5
7	May 10, 2025	New York Red Bulls	LA Galaxy	0	7
7	June 7, 2025	Chicago Fire FC	D.C. United	1	6
7	September 13, 2025	Vancouver Whitecaps FC	Philadelphia Union	0	7
7	August 29, 2026	Inter Miami CF	CF Montréal	1	6

=== Biggest winning margin ===
Margin	Date	Home team	Result	Away team
7	June 4, 1998	Dallas Burn	1–8	Los Angeles Galaxy
7	July 4, 2001	Kansas City Wizards	0–7	Chicago Fire
7	May 21, 2016	New York City FC	0–7	New York Red Bulls
7	September 13, 2017	Atlanta United FC	7–0	New England Revolution
7	July 8, 2022	Philadelphia Union	7–0	DC United
7	May 10, 2025	New York Red Bulls	7–0	LA Galaxy
7	September 13, 2025	Vancouver Whitecaps FC	7–0	Philadelphia Union
6	June 20, 1999	Kansas City Wizards	6–0	MetroStars
6	September 22, 2000	Chicago Fire	6–0	New England Revolution
6	August 26, 2006	New York Red Bulls	6–0	Real Salt Lake
6	April 25, 2009	Real Salt Lake	6–0	New England Revolution
6	August 1, 2009	FC Dallas	6–0	Kansas City Wizards
6	September 5, 2014	Los Angeles Galaxy	6–0	Colorado Rapids
6	April 20, 2018	Sporting Kansas City	6–0	Vancouver Whitecaps FC
6	August 25, 2018	Colorado Rapids	0–6	Real Salt Lake
6	March 30, 2019	Sporting Kansas City	7–1	Montreal Impact
6	June 29, 2019	Minnesota United FC	7–1	FC Cincinnati
6	October 6, 2019	FC Dallas	6–0	Sporting Kansas City
6	September 10, 2020	Seattle Sounders FC	7–1	San Jose Earthquakes
6	September 23, 2020	Los Angeles FC	6–0	Vancouver Whitecaps FC
6	July 3, 2021	D.C. United	7–1	Toronto FC
6	October 23, 2021	New York City FC	6–0	D.C. United
6	April 17, 2022	New York City FC	6–0	Real Salt Lake
6	July 30, 2022	Philadelphia Union	6–0	Houston Dynamo FC
6	August 20, 2022	D.C. United	0–6	Philadelphia Union
6	August 27, 2022	Philadelphia Union	6–0	Colorado Rapids
6	September 10, 2022	FC Cincinnati	6–0	San Jose Earthquakes
6	June 7, 2025	D.C. United	1–7	Chicago Fire FC
6	March 15, 2026	Vancouver Whitecaps FC	6–0	Minnesota United FC
6	April 4, 2026	Los Angeles FC	6–0	Orlando City SC
6	May 9, 2026	Portland Timbers	6–0	Sporting Kansas City
6	August 29, 2026	Inter Miami CF	7–1	CF Montréal

== Longest streaks ==
=== Consecutive postseason berths ===
As of 2026 season

Legend
Consecutive run in progress

Most consecutive postseason berths
Rank	Team	Number	From	Until
1	New York Red Bulls	15	2010	2024
2	Seattle Sounders FC	13	2009	2021
3	New England Revolution	8	2002	2009
3	Sporting Kansas City	8	2011	2018
5	Dallas Burn	7	1996	2002
5	Real Salt Lake	7	2008	2014
5	New York City FC	7	2016	2022
5	Orlando City SC	7	2020	2026
9	Chicago Fire	6	1998	2003
9	New York Red Bulls	6	2003	2008
9	Philadelphia Union	6	2018	2023
9	Real Salt Lake	6	2021	2026

=== Winning streaks ===
Most wins in a row
Team	No.	From	To
Los Angeles Galaxy	15	September 7, 1997	May 17, 1998
Los Angeles Galaxy	12	April 13, 1996	June 26, 1996
Chicago Fire	11	May 16, 1998	July 4, 1998
D.C. United	11	July 25, 1999	September 25, 1999
Seattle Sounders FC	9	July 21, 2018	September 15, 2018
Charlotte FC	9	July 12, 2025	September 13, 2025
Philadelphia Union	8	August 29, 2026	October 14, 2026
Sporting Kansas City	7	March 10, 2012	April 18, 2012
Los Angeles FC	7	July 8, 2022	August 16, 2022
FC Cincinnati	7	April 20, 2024	May 25, 2024

1. Shoot-outs: From 1996–1999, there were no ties; if a game was tied at the end of regulation time, it was decided by a shoot-out.
- The longest winning start to a season was achieved by the LA Galaxy in 1996, who opened the campaign with twelve consecutive wins and won their first eight games in regulation.
- The longest winning end to a season was achieved by the LA Galaxy in 1997, who closed the campaign with six straight wins.

=== Undefeated streaks (regular season) ===
Legend
Unbeaten run in progress

As of October 24, 2026

Most consecutive games undefeated (regular season)
Rank	Team	No.	Start date	End date
1	St. Louis City SC	19	May 9, 2026	October 14, 2026
1	Inter Miami CF	19	July 17, 2024	April 19, 2025
1	FC Dallas	19	May 27, 2010	October 9, 2010
1	Columbus Crew	19	July 3, 2004	April 2, 2005
5	Toronto FC	18	August 10, 2019	August 28, 2020
5	New York Red Bulls	18	July 10, 2016	March 11, 2017
5	Real Salt Lake	18	November 24, 2010	April 13, 2011
8	Real Salt Lake	16	September 28, 2013	May 24, 2014
9	Philadelphia Union	15	July 22, 2026	October 17, 2026
9	Real Salt Lake	15	March 23, 2024	June 19, 2024
9	Seattle Sounders FC	15	November 4, 2020	July 7, 2021
9	Portland Timbers	15	April 14, 2018	August 4, 2018
9	Colorado Rapids	15	April 13, 2016	July 23, 2016
9	Portland Timbers	15	March 16, 2013	July 7, 2013
9	Los Angeles Galaxy	15	October 2, 2009	June 5, 2010
9	Los Angeles Galaxy	15	September 7, 1997	May 17, 1998

- Most recently achieved streak listed first
- The longest unbeaten start to a season was achieved by the Seattle Sounders FC in 2021. The Sounders opened their campaign with thirteen unbeaten matches (eight wins and five draws).
- The longest unbeaten end to a season was achieved by the Columbus Crew in 2004, who closed the campaign after eighteen matches unbeaten (eight wins and ten draws).

=== Undefeated streaks (all competitions) ===
Legend
Unbeaten run in progress

As of October 17, 2026

Most consecutive games undefeated (all competitions)
Rank	Team	No.	Start date	End date
1	St. Louis City SC	21	May 9, 2026	October 14, 2026
2	New York Red Bulls	20	July 10, 2016	October 23, 2016
3	FC Dallas	19	May 27, 2010	October 9, 2010
3	LA Galaxy	19	October 2, 2009	June 5, 2010
5	Portland Timbers	18	March 16, 2013	July 7, 2013

- Most recently achieved streak listed first

=== Home undefeated streaks ===
Legend
Unbeaten run in progress
Defunct team

- Only regular season MLS matches count towards individual team records.

As of 2026 season

Most consecutive home wins/draws
Team	Home games unbeaten	Start date	End date
Atlanta United FC	13	September 10, 2021	May 15, 2022
Austin FC	9	May 14, 2025	September 21, 2025
Charlotte FC	13	June 10, 2023	April 21, 2024
Chicago Fire FC	15	May 24, 2000	May 26, 2001
Chivas USA	16	September 9, 2006	September 27, 2007
FC Cincinnati	13	February 25, 2023	August 26, 2023
Colorado Rapids	23	May 8, 2021	May 22, 2022
Columbus Crew	22	June 28, 2008	September 26, 2009
D.C. United	17	March 30, 2012	March 9, 2013
FC Dallas	19	August 29, 2015	September 3, 2016
Houston Dynamo	30	July 9, 2011	April 28, 2013
Inter Miami CF	12	June 1, 2024	April 6, 2025
Los Angeles FC	19	August 15, 2018	September 1, 2019
Los Angeles Galaxy	23	April 12, 2014	May 27, 2015
Miami Fusion	11	August 5, 2000	June 30, 2001
Minnesota United FC	10	June 29, 2019	August 21, 2020
CF Montréal	8	August 4, 2018	April 28, 2019
Nashville SC	22	April 17, 2021	June 11, 2022
New England Revolution	17	July 30, 2014	June 13, 2015
New York City FC	15	September 23, 2017	August 22, 2018
New York Red Bulls	19	April 24, 2016	April 29, 2017
Orlando City SC	17	August 1, 2015	July 31, 2016
Philadelphia Union	24	September 19, 2021	March 11, 2023
Portland Timbers	22	April 6, 2013	May 17, 2014
Real Salt Lake	29	June 6, 2009	May 14, 2011
San Jose Earthquakes	18	September 25, 2004	October 8, 2005
Seattle Sounders FC	14	September 10, 2020	July 7, 2021
Sporting Kansas City	24	June 19, 2016	September 24, 2017
St. Louis City SC	11	May 13, 2026	October 14, 2026
Tampa Bay Mutiny	8	August 17, 1996	May 10, 1997
Toronto FC	17	June 13, 2009	August 7, 2010
Vancouver Whitecaps FC	10	March 2, 2013	July 14, 2013

Notes

1. Seattle (SEA): Seattle Sounders FC has accomplished this home unbeaten run twice; the most recent dates are shown

=== Losing streaks ===
Most losses in a row
Team	No.	From	To
FC Cincinnati	14	September 15, 2021	March 5, 2022
MetroStars	12	July 4, 1999	September 5, 1999
Real Salt Lake	10	August 10, 2005	October 5. 2005
Orlando City SC	9	May 13, 2018	July 7, 2018
New England Revolution	9	July 20, 1997	September 9, 1997
New England Revolution	9	May 13, 1998	July 1, 1998
Toronto FC	9	March 17, 2012	May 19, 2012

1. Shoot-outs: From 1996–1999, there were no ties; if a game was tied at the end of regulation time, it was decided by a shoot-out.
- The longest losing start to a season was achieved by Toronto FC in 2012, who opened the campaign with nine consecutive losses.
- The longest losing end to a season was achieved by FC Cincinnati in 2021, who closed the campaign with twelve consecutive losses.

=== Tie streaks ===
Most ties in a row
Team	No.	From	To
Toronto FC	8	August 6, 2025	October 4, 2025
San Jose Earthquakes	6	September 25, 2004	April 9, 2005
Colorado Rapids	6	May 7, 2011	June 4, 2011
Chicago Fire	6	March 16, 2014	April 19, 2014
Chicago Fire	5	April 11, 2009	May 9, 2009
Los Angeles Galaxy	5	May 6, 2009	May 30, 2009
Seattle Sounders FC	5	May 2, 2009	May 30, 2009
Vancouver Whitecaps FC	5	July 20, 2021	August 13, 2021
Nashville SC	5	September 26, 2021	October 20, 2021
New York City FC	5	June 3, 2023	June 24, 2023
Charlotte FC	5	June 10, 2023	July 8, 2023
Philadelphia Union	5	September 16, 2023	September 30, 2023
FC Dallas	5	September 23, 2023	October 14, 2023
Columbus Crew	5	March 30, 2024	April 27, 2024

- The longest streak of ties to start a season was achieved by the LA Galaxy in 2003, the New York Red Bulls in 2006, Columbus Crew SC in 2007, the Portland Timbers in 2015, the Colorado Rapids in 2015, New York City FC in 2019, Nashville SC in 2021 and 2024, the Philadelphia Union in 2024, and Sporting Kansas City in 2024, who each opened their respective campaigns with three consecutive ties.
- The longest streak of ties to end a season was achieved by the San Jose Earthquakes in 2004 and 2023 and the Montreal Impact in 2014, who each closed their respective campaigns with four consecutive ties.

=== Title droughts ===
Longest "active" title droughts
Team	No. of seasons	Last title	Year
Atlanta United FC	6	U.S. Open Cup	2019
Austin FC	5	None (joined league in 2021)	—
Charlotte FC	4	None (joined league in 2022)	—
Chicago Fire FC	19	U.S. Open Cup	2006
FC Cincinnati	2	Supporters' Shield	2023
Colorado Rapids	15	MLS Cup	2010
Columbus Crew	1	Leagues Cup	2024
FC Dallas	9	Supporters' Shield	2016
D.C. United	12	U.S. Open Cup	2013
Houston Dynamo FC	2	U.S. Open Cup	2023
Inter Miami CF	0	MLS Cup	2025
LA Galaxy	1	MLS Cup	2024
Los Angeles FC	1	U.S. Open Cup	2024
Minnesota United FC	9	None (joined league in 2017)	—
CF Montréal	4	Canadian Championship	2021
Nashville SC	0	U.S. Open Cup	2025
New England Revolution	4	Supporters' Shield	2021
New York City FC	4	MLS Cup	2021
New York Red Bulls	7	Supporters' Shield	2018
Orlando City SC	3	U.S. Open Cup	2022
Philadelphia Union	0	Supporters' Shield	2025
Portland Timbers	5	MLS is Back Tournament	2020
Real Salt Lake	16	MLS Cup	2009
San Diego FC	0	None (joined league in 2025)	—
San Jose Earthquakes	13	Supporters' Shield	2012
Seattle Sounders FC	0	Leagues Cup	2025
Sporting Kansas City	8	U.S. Open Cup	2017
St. Louis City SC	2	None (joined league in 2023)	—
Toronto FC	5	Canadian Championship	2020
Vancouver Whitecaps FC	0	Canadian Championship	2025

- Titles include MLS Cup, Supporters' Shield, U.S. Open Cup, Canadian Championship, MLS is Back Tournament and continental competitions (CONCACAF Champions Cup, Leagues Cup and Campeones Cup).
- As of end of 2025 MLS Cup playoffs.

== Average season attendances ==
- Highest single match attendance: 82,110 (Los Angeles Galaxy vs. Los Angeles FC, July 4, 2023)
- Highest average attendance: 53,002 (Atlanta United, 2018)
- Lowest average attendance: 7,063 (Chivas USA, 2014)
- Lowest single match attendance: 3,702 (Chivas USA vs. Portland Timbers, May 28, 2014)

== Streaks ==
- Diego Chará is the longest-tenured player to have played with only one MLS club (Portland Timbers, 16 seasons).
- The longest road trip a team has played during the regular season was recorded by the Portland Timbers in 2019. They opened the season with twelve straight games on the road due to the completion of an expansion to Providence Park in the early part of the 2019 season.
- The record for longest home stand a team has played during the regular season is shared by the Chicago Fire in 2006, Sporting Kansas City in 2011, and Toronto FC in 2026. They each played nine consecutive games at home.
- The highest number of points achieved by a team at home during a regular season is 47 by Nashville SC in 2026 (15–0–2). Previously, it was 43 (14–2–1) by the New York Red Bulls in 2018 and 42 (13–1–3) by Toronto FC in 2017.
- The highest number of points achieved by a team on the road during a regular season is 37, by the LA Galaxy in 1998 (13–3), Inter Miami CF in 2024 (11–2–4), and San Diego FC in 2025 (12–4–1).
- The record number of consecutive games scored in by a player is 15, set by Josef Martínez for Atlanta United FC in 2019.

== See also ==
- List of American and Canadian soccer champions
